= 1982 FIFA World Cup Group 2 =

Football tournament group stage

Group 2 of the 1982 FIFA World Cup was one of six groups of national teams competing in the group stage of the 1982 FIFA World Cup. Play began on 14 June and ended on 25 June 1982. The group consisted of four teams: Seeded team, the European champions West Germany, World Cup debutants Algeria, Chile and Austria.

West Germany won the group and advanced to the second round, along with Austria. The final game in the group, between these two teams, was one of the most controversial in World Cup history: with both teams knowing a win by one or two goals for West Germany would result in both them and Austria qualifying at the expense of Algeria, after West Germany took the lead after 10 minutes, the remainder of the match was played without any serious attempts from either side to score. This match is famously known as "The Disgrace of Gijón". FIFA amended the rules for all future tournaments so that the final group fixtures are always played simultaneously to avoid a repeat of this situation.

== Standings ==
Pos	Team	Pld	W	D	L	GF	GA	GD	Pts	Qualification
1	West Germany	3	2	0	1	6	3	+3	4	Advance to second round
2	Austria	3	2	0	1	3	1	+2	4	Advance to second round
3	Algeria	3	2	0	1	5	5	0	4	
4	Chile	3	0	0	3	3	8	−5	0	

Source: FIFA

== Matches ==
=== West Germany vs Algeria ===
16 June 1982
17:15 CEST

West Germany	1–2	Algeria
Rummenigge 67'		Madjer 54'; Belloumi 68'

El Molinón, Gijón
Attendance: 42,000
Referee: Enrique Labo Revoredo (Peru)

West Germany	Algeria

GK	1	Harald Schumacher
SW	15	Uli Stielike
DF	20	Manfred Kaltz
DF	4	Karlheinz Förster
DF	2	Hans-Peter Briegel
MF	6	Wolfgang Dremmler
MF	3	Paul Breitner
MF	14	Felix Magath	(substituted off) 83'
FW	11	Karl-Heinz Rummenigge (c)
FW	9	Horst Hrubesch	(yellow card) 57'
FW	7	Pierre Littbarski
Substitutes:
GK	22	Eike Immel
DF	5	Bernd Förster
FW	8	Klaus Fischer	(substituted on) 83'
DF	12	Wilfried Hannes
FW	13	Uwe Reinders
Manager:
Jupp Derwall

GK	1	Mehdi Cerbah
SW	2	Mahmoud Guendouz
DF	5	Chaâbane Merzekane
DF	4	Noureddine Kourichi
DF	16	Faouzi Mansouri
MF	8	Ali Fergani (c)
MF	15	Mustapha Dahleb
MF	10	Lakhdar Belloumi
MF	14	Djamel Zidane		(substituted off) 64'
FW	7	Salah Assad
FW	11	Rabah Madjer	(yellow card) 83'	(substituted off) 88'
Substitutes:
GK	21	Mourad Amara
FW	9	Tedj Bensaoula		(substituted on) 64'
DF	12	Salah Larbès		(substituted on) 88'
MF	19	Djamel Tlemçani
FW	20	Abdelmajid Bourebbou
Co-managers:
Mahieddine Khalef & Rachid Mekhloufi

Assistant referees:
Gilberto Aristizábal (Colombia)
Paolo Casarin (Italy)

=== Chile vs Austria ===
17 June 1982
17:15 CEST

Chile	0–1	Austria
		Schachner 22'

Estadio Carlos Tartiere, Oviedo
Attendance: 22,500
Referee: Juan Daniel Cardellino (Uruguay)

Chile	Austria

GK	22	Mario Osbén
SW	5	Elías Figueroa (c)
DF	2	Lizardo Garrido	(yellow card) 29'
DF	3	René Valenzuela
DF	4	Vladimir Bigorra
MF	6	Rodolfo Dubó
MF	7	Eduardo Bonvallet
MF	20	Miguel Ángel Neira		(substituted off) 71'
MF	11	Gustavo Moscoso		(substituted off) 69'
FW	15	Patricio Yáñez
FW	13	Carlos Caszely
Substitutes:
GK	1	Oscar Wirth
MF	10	Mario Soto
MF	16	Manuel Rojas		(substituted on) 71'
DF	19	Enzo Escobar
FW	21	Miguel Ángel Gamboa		(substituted on) 69'
Manager:
Luis Santibáñez

GK	1	Friedrich Koncilia
SW	3	Erich Obermayer (c)
DF	2	Bernd Krauss
DF	5	Bruno Pezzey
DF	4	Josef Degeorgi	(yellow card) 12'	(substituted off) 78'
MF	8	Herbert Prohaska
MF	6	Roland Hattenberger	(yellow card) 66'
MF	10	Reinhold Hintermaier
MF	19	Heribert Weber		(substituted off) 79'
FW	7	Walter Schachner
FW	9	Hans Krankl
Substitutes:
GK	22	Klaus Lindenberger
MF	12	Anton Pichler
DF	14	Ernst Baumeister		(substituted on) 78'
FW	18	Gernot Jurtin		(substituted on) 79'
FW	20	Kurt Welzl
Co-managers:
Felix Latzke & Georg Schmidt

Assistant referees:
Paolo Casarin (Italy)
Gilberto Aristizábal (Colombia)

=== West Germany vs Chile ===
20 June 1982
17:15 CEST

West Germany	4–1	Chile
Rummenigge 9', 57', 66'; Reinders 83'		Moscoso 90'

El Molinón, Gijón
Attendance: 42,000
Referee: Bruno Galler (Switzerland)

West Germany	Chile

GK	1	Toni Schumacher
SW	15	Uli Stielike
DF	20	Manfred Kaltz
DF	4	Karlheinz Förster
DF	2	Hans-Peter Briegel
MF	11	Karl-Heinz Rummenigge (c)
MF	6	Wolfgang Dremmler
MF	3	Paul Breitner	(substituted off) 61'
MF	14	Felix Magath
FW	9	Horst Hrubesch
FW	7	Pierre Littbarski	(substituted off) 79'
Substitutes:
GK	22	Eike Immel
FW	8	Klaus Fischer
DF	12	Wilfried Hannes
FW	13	Uwe Reinders	(substituted on) 79'
MF	18	Lothar Matthäus	(substituted on) 61'
Manager:
Jupp Derwall

GK	22	Mario Osbén
SW	5	Elías Figueroa (c)
DF	3	René Valenzuela
DF	4	Vladimir Bigorra
DF	2	Lizardo Garrido
MF	15	Patricio Yáñez
MF	10	Mario Soto		(substituted off) 46'
MF	6	Rodolfo Dubó	(yellow card) 11'
MF	7	Eduardo Bonvallet
FW	21	Miguel Ángel Gamboa	(yellow card) 29'	(substituted off) 66'
FW	11	Gustavo Moscoso
Substitutes:
GK	1	Oscar Wirth
FW	9	Juan Carlos Letelier		(substituted on) 46'
MF	14	Raúl Ormeño
DF	19	Enzo Escobar
MF	20	Miguel Ángel Neira		(substituted on) 66'
Manager:
Luis Santibáñez

Assistant referees:
Vojtech Christov (Czechoslovakia)
Tony Boskovic (Australia)

=== Algeria vs Austria ===
21 June 1982
17:15 CEST

Algeria	0–2	Austria
		Schachner 55'; Krankl 67'

Estadio Carlos Tartiere, Oviedo
Attendance: 22,000
Referee: Tony Boskovic (Australia)

Algeria	Austria

GK	1	Mehdi Cerbah
DF	5	Chaâbane Merzekane
DF	2	Mahmoud Guendouz
DF	4	Noureddine Kourichi
DF	16	Faouzi Mansouri	(yellow card) 67'
MF	8	Ali Fergani (c)
MF	15	Mustapha Dahleb		(substituted off) 76'
MF	10	Lakhdar Belloumi		(substituted off) 65'
FW	11	Rabah Madjer
FW	14	Djamel Zidane
FW	7	Salah Assad
Substitutes:
GK	21	Mourad Amara
MF	6	Ali Bencheikh
FW	9	Tedj Bensaoula		(substituted on) 65'
DF	12	Salah Larbès
MF	19	Djamel Tlemçani		(substituted on) 76'
Co-managers:
Mahieddine Khalef & Rachid Mekhloufi

GK	1	Friedrich Koncilia
DF	2	Bernd Krauss
DF	3	Erich Obermayer (c)
DF	5	Bruno Pezzey
DF	4	Josef Degeorgi
MF	6	Roland Hattenberger
MF	8	Herbert Prohaska	(substituted off) 80'
MF	10	Reinhold Hintermaier
DF	14	Ernst Baumeister	(substituted off) 46'
FW	7	Walter Schachner
FW	9	Hans Krankl
Substitutes:
GK	22	Klaus Lindenberger
DF	17	Johann Pregesbauer
FW	18	Gernot Jurtin
DF	19	Heribert Weber	(substituted on) 80'
FW	20	Kurt Welzl	(substituted on) 46'
Co-managers:
Felix Latzke & Georg Schmidt

Assistant referees:
Vojtech Christov (Czechoslovakia)
Ebrahim Al Doy (Bahrain)

=== Algeria vs Chile ===
24 June 1982
17:15 CEST

Algeria	3–2	Chile
Assad 7', 31'; Bensaoula 35'		Neira 59' (pen.); Letelier 73'

Estadio Carlos Tartiere, Oviedo
Attendance: 16,000
Referee: Rómulo Méndez (Guatemala)

Algeria	Chile

GK	1	Mehdi Cerbah
DF	5	Chaâbane Merzekane
DF	12	Salah Larbès
DF	4	Noureddine Kourichi
DF	2	Mahmoud Guendouz
MF	8	Ali Fergani (c)
MF	16	Faouzi Mansouri	(substituted off) 75'
MF	20	Abdelmajid Bourebbou	(substituted off) 31'
FW	11	Rabah Madjer
FW	9	Tedj Bensaoula
FW	7	Salah Assad
Substitutes:
GK	21	Mourad Amara
MF	13	Hocine Yahi	(substituted on) 31'
MF	15	Mustapha Dahleb	(substituted on) 75'
DF	17	Abdelkader Horr
MF	19	Djamel Tlemçani
Manager:
Mahieddine Khalef & Rachid Mekhloufi

GK	22	Mario Osbén
DF	18	Mario Galindo
DF	5	Elías Figueroa (c)
DF	3	René Valenzuela
DF	4	Vladimir Bigorra
MF	6	Rodolfo Dubó
MF	7	Eduardo Bonvallet		(substituted off) 37'
MF	20	Miguel Ángel Neira
FW	15	Patricio Yáñez
FW	13	Carlos Caszely		(substituted off) 58'
FW	11	Gustavo Moscoso
Substitutes:
GK	1	Oscar Wirth
FW	9	Juan Carlos Letelier	(yellow card) 88'	(substituted on) 58'
MF	10	Mario Soto		(substituted on) 37'
DF	19	Enzo Escobar
FW	21	Miguel Ángel Gamboa
Manager:
Luis Santibáñez

Assistant referees:
Erik Fredriksson (Sweden)
Arnaldo Cézar Coelho (Brazil)

=== West Germany vs Austria ===
25 June 1982
17:15 CEST

West Germany	1–0	Austria
Hrubesch 10'

El Molinón, Gijón
Attendance: 41,000
Referee: Bob Valentine (Scotland)

West Germany	Austria

GK	1	Toni Schumacher
SW	15	Uli Stielike
CB	20	Manfred Kaltz
CB	4	Karlheinz Förster
CB	2	Hans-Peter Briegel
RM	11	Karl-Heinz Rummenigge (c)	(substituted off) 66'
CM	6	Wolfgang Dremmler
CM	3	Paul Breitner
LM	14	Felix Magath
CF	9	Horst Hrubesch	(substituted off) 69'
CF	7	Pierre Littbarski
Substitutes:
GK	22	Eike Immel
DF	5	Bernd Förster
MF	18	Lothar Matthäus	(substituted on) 66'
FW	8	Klaus Fischer	(substituted on) 69'
FW	13	Uwe Reinders
Manager:
Jupp Derwall

GK	1	Friedrich Koncilia
SW	3	Erich Obermayer (c)
CB	2	Bernd Krauss
CB	5	Bruno Pezzey
CB	4	Josef Degeorgi
RM	6	Roland Hattenberger
CM	19	Heribert Weber
CM	8	Herbert Prohaska
LM	10	Reinhold Hintermaier	(yellow card) 32'
CF	7	Walter Schachner	(yellow card) 73' (Note: Schachner was booked in the 73rd minute, though the FIFA report mistakenly lists this as the 32nd minute.)
CF	9	Hans Krankl
Substitutes:
GK	22	Klaus Lindenberger
DF	12	Anton Pichler
DF	13	Max Hagmayr
MF	14	Ernst Baumeister
FW	20	Kurt Welzl
Managers:
Felix Latzke; Georg Schmidt

Linesmen:
Ebrahim Al Doy (Bahrain)
Arnaldo Cézar Coelho (Brazil)

== See also ==
- Algeria at the FIFA World Cup
- Austria at the FIFA World Cup
- Chile at the FIFA World Cup
- Germany at the FIFA World Cup
