= 1982 FIFA World Cup Group D =

Football tournament group

Group D was one of four groups of national teams competing in the second stage of the 1982 FIFA World Cup. The group's three matches were staged at the Estadio Vicente Calderón in Madrid. The group consisted of three teams advancing from the first group stage: Group 2 runners-up Austria, Group 5 winners Northern Ireland and Group 4 runners-up France.

France topped the group and advanced to the semi-finals.

== Qualified teams ==
The winner of Group 5 and the runners-up of Group 2 and 4 qualified for Group D of the second round.

Group	Winners
5	Northern Ireland
Group	Runners-up
2	Austria
4	France

== Standings ==
Pos	Team	Pld	W	D	L	GF	GA	GD	Pts	Qualification
1	France	2	2	0	0	5	1	+4	4	Advance to knockout stage
2	Austria	2	0	1	1	2	3	−1	1	
3	Northern Ireland	2	0	1	1	3	6	−3	1	

Source: FIFA

== Matches ==
=== Austria vs France ===
28 June 1982
17:15 CEST

Austria	0–1	France
		Genghini 39'

Vicente Calderón, Madrid
Attendance: 37,000
Referee: Károly Palotai (Hungary)

Austria	France

GK	1	Friedrich Koncilia
SW	3	Erich Obermayer (c)	(yellow card) 60'
DF	2	Bernd Krauss
DF	5	Bruno Pezzey
DF	4	Josef Degeorgi		(substituted off) 46'
MF	6	Roland Hattenberger
MF	8	Herbert Prohaska
MF	10	Reinhold Hintermaier
FW	11	Kurt Jara		(substituted off) 46'
FW	7	Walter Schachner
FW	9	Hans Krankl
Substitutes:
GK	22	Klaus Lindenberger
MF	14	Ernst Baumeister		(substituted on) 46'
FW	18	Gernot Jurtin
DF	19	Heribert Weber
FW	20	Kurt Welzl		(substituted on) 46'
Managers:
Felix Latzke & Georg Schmidt

GK	22	Jean-Luc Ettori
SW	8	Marius Trésor (c)
DF	5	Gérard Janvion
DF	4	Maxime Bossis
DF	3	Patrick Battiston
MF	9	Bernard Genghini	(substituted off) 85'
MF	12	Alain Giresse
MF	14	Jean Tigana
FW	20	Gérard Soler
FW	17	Bernard Lacombe	(substituted off) 15'
FW	19	Didier Six
Substitutes:
GK	1	Dominique Baratelli
DF	6	Christian Lopez
MF	11	René Girard	(substituted on) 85'
MF	13	Jean-François Larios
FW	18	Dominique Rocheteau	(substituted on) 15'
Manager:
Michel Hidalgo

Assistant referees:
Vojtech Christov (Czechoslovakia)
Damir Matovinović (Yugoslavia)

=== Austria vs Northern Ireland ===
1 July 1982
17:15 CEST

Austria	2–2	Northern Ireland
Pezzey 50'; Hintermaier 68'		Hamilton 27', 75'

Vicente Calderón, Madrid
Attendance: 20,000
Referee: Adolf Prokop (East Germany)

Austria	Northern Ireland

GK	1	Friedrich Koncilia
SW	3	Erich Obermayer (c)
DF	2	Bernd Krauss
DF	5	Bruno Pezzey
DF	17	Johann Pregesbauer		(substituted off) 46'
MF	12	Anton Pichler	(yellow card) 86'
MF	8	Herbert Prohaska
MF	14	Ernst Baumeister
FW	7	Walter Schachner
FW	13	Max Hagmayr		(substituted off) 46'
FW	18	Gernot Jurtin
Substitutes:
GK	22	Klaus Lindenberger
MF	10	Reinhold Hintermaier		(substituted on) 46'
MF	15	Johann Dihanich
DF	16	Gerald Messlender
FW	20	Kurt Welzl		(substituted on) 46'
Managers:
Felix Latzke & Georg Schmidt

GK	17	Jim Platt
DF	2	Jimmy Nicholl
DF	5	Chris Nicholl
DF	12	John McClelland
DF	13	Sammy Nelson
MF	8	Martin O'Neill (c)
MF	10	Sammy McIlroy
MF	4	David McCreery
MF	9	Gerry Armstrong
FW	16	Norman Whiteside	(substituted off) 68'
FW	11	Billy Hamilton
Substitutes:
GK	22	George Dunlop
DF	6	John O'Neill
MF	7	Noel Brotherston	(substituted on) 68'
MF	14	Tommy Cassidy
MF	20	Jim Cleary
Manager:
Billy Bingham

Assistant referees:
Erik Fredriksson (Sweden)
Walter Eschweiler (West Germany)

=== France vs Northern Ireland ===
4 July 1982
17:15 CEST

France	4–1	Northern Ireland
Giresse 33', 80'; Rocheteau 46', 68'		Armstrong 75'

Vicente Calderón, Madrid
Attendance: 37,000
Referee: Alojzy Jarguz (Poland)

France	Northern Ireland

GK	22	Jean-Luc Ettori
DF	2	Manuel Amoros
DF	8	Marius Trésor
DF	5	Gérard Janvion
DF	4	Maxime Bossis
MF	9	Bernard Genghini
MF	12	Alain Giresse
MF	10	Michel Platini (c)
MF	14	Jean Tigana	(yellow card) 57'
FW	18	Dominique Rocheteau		(substituted off) 83'
FW	20	Gérard Soler		(substituted off) 63'
Substitutes:
GK	21	Jean Castaneda
DF	3	Patrick Battiston
DF	6	Christian Lopez
FW	16	Alain Couriol		(substituted on) 83'
MF	19	Didier Six		(substituted on) 63'
Manager:
Michel Hidalgo

GK	1	Pat Jennings
DF	2	Jimmy Nicholl
DF	5	Chris Nicholl
DF	12	John McClelland
DF	3	Mal Donaghy
MF	8	Martin O'Neill (c)
MF	10	Sammy McIlroy
MF	4	David McCreery		(substituted off) 86'
MF	9	Gerry Armstrong
FW	11	Billy Hamilton	(yellow card) 59'
FW	16	Norman Whiteside
Substitutes:
GK	17	Jim Platt
DF	6	John O'Neill		(substituted on) 86'
MF	14	Tommy Cassidy
MF	15	Tommy Finney
MF	20	Jim Cleary
Manager:
Billy Bingham

Assistant referees:
Nicolae Rainea (Romania)
Yousef Alghoul (Libya)

== See also ==
- Austria at the FIFA World Cup
- France at the FIFA World Cup
- Northern Ireland at the FIFA World Cup
