= Disgrace of Gijón =

1982 association football match

West Germany v Austria
Disgrace of Gijón (Schande von Gijón) Scandal of Gijón (فضيحة خيخون) The Match of Shame (le Match de la honte)
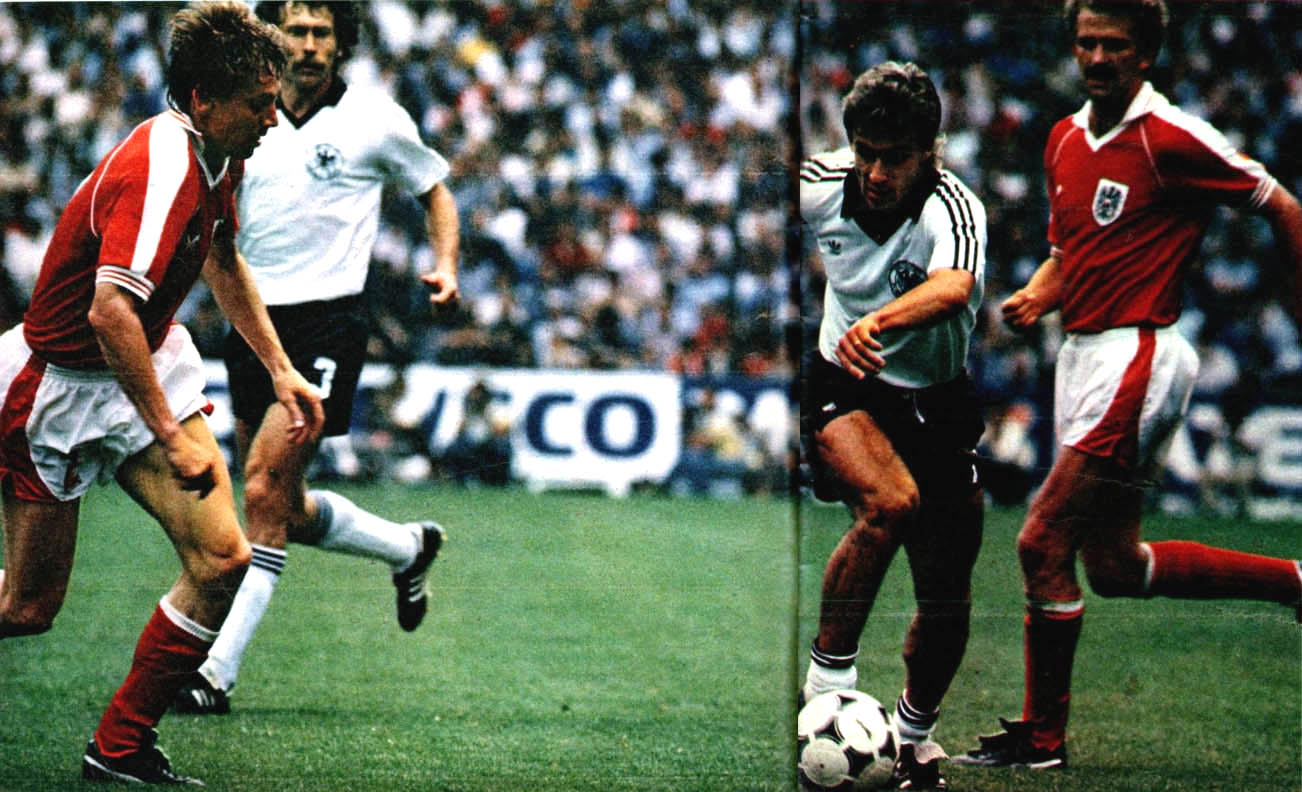
- A moment of the match
- Event: 1982 FIFA World Cup
West Germany	Austria
(West Germany)	(Austria)
1	0
- Both teams advance to second round Algeria eliminated from 1982 FIFA World Cup on goal difference
- Date: 25 June 1982; 44 years ago
- Venue: El Molinón, Gijón
- Referee: Bob Valentine (Scotland)
- Attendance: 41,000

The Disgrace of Gijón (Spanish: Desgracia de Gijón) is one of many names given in hindsight to the 1982 FIFA World Cup football match played at the El Molinón stadium in Gijón, Spain, on 25 June 1982, in which West Germany beat Austria 1–0. Both teams advanced to the next round while Algeria were eliminated by having the lowest goal difference. Algeria had played their last game a day earlier, unable to achieve the four-goal victory margin that would have seen them through regardless of what happened in this match. In German, the match is known as Nichtangriffspakt von Gijón (lit. "Non-aggression pact of Gijón") or Schande von Gijón (lit. "Disgrace of Gijón"), while in Algeria it is called فضيحة خيخون (faḍīḥat Khīkhūn, "Scandal of Gijón"), and in French le Match de la honte (lit. "The Shameful Match"); it has also been satirically referred to as the Anschluss (a reference to the Nazi German annexation of Austria in 1938).

The Algerian team had beaten two-time World Champions and reigning European Champions West Germany 2–1 in the first round, then had lost to Austria 2–0, before beating Chile 3–2. As the last game of the first-round Group 2 was scheduled a day later, the two German-speaking teams had an advantage in knowing that a West German win by fewer than three goals would qualify both, while any other result would see either Austria or West Germany eliminated. After a German goal early in the game, the match remained competitive before the teams started to "defend" the 1–0 score in the second half, as there was little benefit for either side to try harder. Many spectators, mostly Algerians, were unhappy with the perceived lack of effort, and accused the West German and Austrian teams of manipulation.

Despite widespread condemnation and a formal complaint lodged by Algeria – who were consequently eliminated – FIFA ruled that neither team had broken any rules. Following the tournament – with similar controversy regarding Argentina vs Peru in the previous World Cup – FIFA revised the group system for future competitions so that the final two games in each group would be played simultaneously. This change made it highly impractical for teams to engage in any form of match-fixing, since they would not know what result was required ahead of time.

== Background ==
- Note: 2 points for a win, 1 for a draw, first tie-breaker is goal difference.

Pos	Team	Pld	W	D	L	GF	GA	GD	Pts	Qualification
1	Austria (Y)	2	2	0	0	3	0	+3	4	One match left
2	Algeria (X)	3	2	0	1	5	5	0	4	Undecided (Matches finished)
3	West Germany (Y)	2	1	0	1	5	3	+2	2	One match left
4	Chile (Z)	3	0	0	3	3	8	−5	0	Eliminated

Updated to match(es) played on 24 June 1982. Source: FIFA
(X) Qualification to the knockout stage undecided; (Y) One match left to play; (Z) Could not qualify for the Knockout stage

Algeria began their campaign by recording a surprising 2–1 win over West Germany on the opening day, described as the "greatest World Cup upset since North Korea beat Italy in 1966", and as "one of the biggest shocks in World Cup history". Algeria became the first African or Arab team to defeat a European team at the FIFA World Cup. They then went on to lose 2–0 to Austria before beating Chile 3–2 in their final match. Algeria's victory over Chile made them the first ever African team to win twice at a World Cup.

As Algeria played that final match the day before West Germany met Austria, the two European teams knew what result they needed in order to qualify for the next round. An Austrian victory or a draw would result in Austria and Algeria advancing. West Germany could only advance by winning, which would leave all three teams on four points, at which point tiebreaker rules would come into effect. A West German win by either one or two goals would allow both West Germany and Austria to qualify based on goal difference. A West German victory by four or more goals would make West Germany and Algeria qualify. With a West German win by exactly three goals, West Germany would qualify and leave Austria and Algeria to be separated by the next tiebreaker (goals scored). In this scenario, Austria would need to have scored at least two goals in defeat (e.g., lose 5–2, 6–3, etc.) to advance.

== Match ==
=== Summary ===
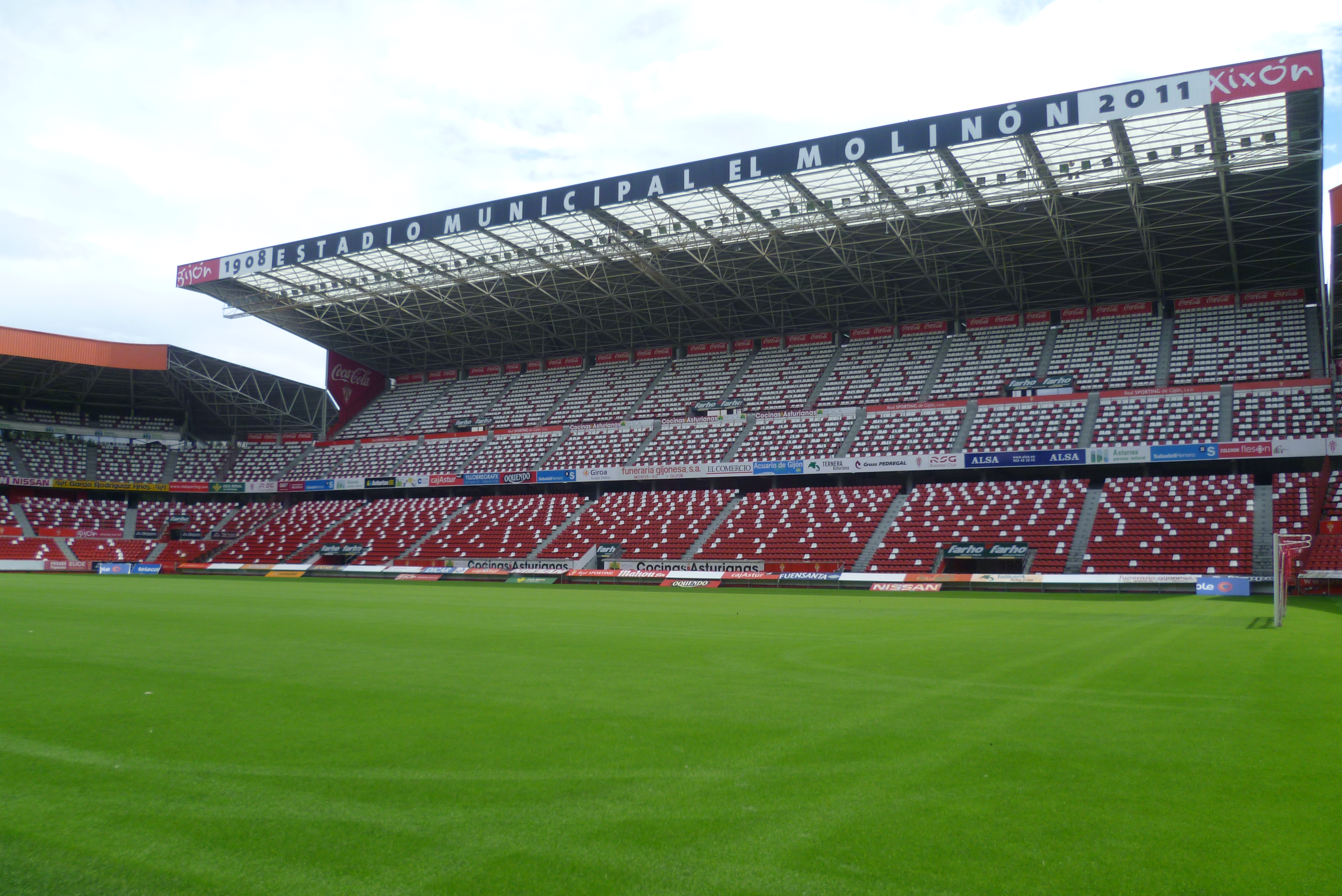
El Molinón, the venue for the match

After ten minutes of furious attack, West Germany succeeded in scoring through a goal by Horst Hrubesch after a cross from the left. After the goal was scored, the team in possession of the ball often passed between themselves in their own half until an opposition player came into the vicinity of the ball, then the ball was passed back to the goalkeeper. Isolated long balls were played into the opposition's half, with little consequence. There were few tackles, and both sets of players flamboyantly missed with apparently no attempt at accuracy whenever they shot on goal. The only Austrian player who seemed to make any effort at livening the game up was Walter Schachner, although he had little success, while one of the few serious attempts on net was made by Wolfgang Dremmler of West Germany.

This performance was widely deplored by all observers. West German ARD commentator Eberhard Stanjek at one point refused to commentate on the game any longer. Austrian commentator Robert Seeger bemoaned the spectacle, and asked viewers to turn off their television sets. George Vecsey, a New York Times journalist, stated that the teams "seemed to work in concert", although he added that proving such would be impossible. El Comercio, the local newspaper, printed the match report in its crime section.

Likewise, many spectators were not impressed and voiced their disgust with the players. Chants of "¡Fuera, fuera!" ("Out, out!"), "¡Argelia, Argelia!" ("Algeria, Algeria!"), and "¡Que se besen, que se besen!" ("Let them kiss, let them kiss!", which is commonly used at weddings) were shouted by the Spanish crowd, while angry Algerian supporters waved banknotes at the players. The match was criticized even by West German and Austrian fans who had hoped for an exciting rematch of the 1978 World Cup match, the "Miracle of Córdoba", in which Austria had beaten West Germany. One West German fan was so disgusted at the effort that he burned the national flag in protest.

=== Details ===
25 June 1982
17:15 CEST

West Germany	1–0	Austria
Hrubesch 10'

El Molinón, Gijón
Attendance: 41,000
Referee: Bob Valentine (Scotland)

West Germany	Austria

GK	1	Toni Schumacher
SW	15	Uli Stielike
CB	20	Manfred Kaltz
CB	4	Karlheinz Förster
CB	2	Hans-Peter Briegel
RM	11	Karl-Heinz Rummenigge (c)	(substituted off) 66'
CM	6	Wolfgang Dremmler
CM	3	Paul Breitner
LM	14	Felix Magath
CF	9	Horst Hrubesch	(substituted off) 69'
CF	7	Pierre Littbarski
Substitutes:
GK	22	Eike Immel
DF	5	Bernd Förster
FW	8	Klaus Fischer	(substituted on) 69'
FW	13	Uwe Reinders
MF	18	Lothar Matthäus	(substituted on) 66'
Manager:
Jupp Derwall

GK	1	Friedrich Koncilia
SW	3	Erich Obermayer (c)
CB	2	Bernd Krauss
CB	5	Bruno Pezzey
CB	4	Josef Degeorgi
RM	6	Roland Hattenberger
CM	19	Heribert Weber
CM	8	Herbert Prohaska
LM	10	Reinhold Hintermaier	(yellow card) 32'
CF	7	Walter Schachner	(yellow card) 73' (Note: Schachner was booked in the 73rd minute, though the FIFA report mistakenly lists this as the 32nd minute.)
CF	9	Hans Krankl
Substitutes:
GK	22	Klaus Lindenberger
DF	12	Anton Pichler
DF	13	Max Hagmayr
MF	14	Ernst Baumeister
FW	20	Kurt Welzl
Managers:
Felix Latzke; Georg Schmidt

Linesmen:
Ebrahim Al Doy (Bahrain)
Arnaldo Cézar Coelho (Brazil)

== Aftermath ==
Pos	Team	Pld	W	D	L	GF	GA	GD	Pts	Qualification
1	West Germany	3	2	0	1	6	3	+3	4	Advance to second round
2	Austria	3	2	0	1	3	1	+2	4	Advance to second round
3	Algeria	3	2	0	1	5	5	0	4	
4	Chile	3	0	0	3	3	8	−5	0	

Source: FIFA

With West Germany's 1–0 victory, they joined Austria and Algeria with four points in three matches. The teams were separated by goal difference, with West Germany and Austria progressing to the next round of the tournament at the expense of Algeria. The match-fixing saw Austria give up their opportunity to be first in the group (by winning or drawing the match) in exchange for a sure opportunity to advance. The bargaining positions of the two teams were affected by West Germany being in danger of elimination if they failed to win, but also being the better team. By coming second in the group, Austria's second-stage group was France and Northern Ireland. West Germany's opponents were hosts Spain and England who had previously beaten France. Also, for three of the starting players (Horst Hrubesch for West Germany, Josef Degeorgi and Roland Hattenberger for Austria), an additional incentive to avoid aggressive play was that they had been previously booked in their respective teams' first two games. Under the rules then in force, an additional yellow card for any of them in the final group match would have resulted in them serving an automatic one-match ban to start the second round.

After the match, the West German team went back to their hotel where they were met by furious spectators who threw eggs and other projectiles at them; the West Germans returned fire with water bombs. German and Austrian television commentators were so appalled at the match that they urged viewers on live television to stop watching the match and watch something else. The Algerian football officials lodged an official protest. In addition, the president of the Algerian Football Federation opined that referee Bob Valentine should have intervened and his failure to do so was worthy of complaint; however, FIFA considered that no rules were broken as a result of the match, and declined to take any action. Both teams denied any collusion during the match. West Germany manager Jupp Derwall defended his team from the criticism, pointing out that Uli Stielike and Karl-Heinz Rummenigge were both unfit. The West Germans made it to the final, where they lost to Italy 3–1. Austria fell at the next group stage, to the benefit of eventual fourth-place finishers France. As a result of the game, from the World Cup 1986 onward, the final pair of group matches in World Cups always start simultaneously.

Later journalists took another look at the match, wondering if claims of "non-aggression" are exaggerated. In The Irish Times, Rob Smyth wrote: "The 10 minutes after Hrubesch's goal would even be described as exhilarating in some cultures, with Wolfgang Dremmler forcing a fine save from Friedrich Koncilia (the second and final shot on target in the match) and Paul Breitner missing two good chances. The game slows down towards half-time, principally because the hitherto dominant Germany start to play on the counterattack. Hrubesch would have had a clear shooting chance in the 57th minute had he not hopelessly miscontrolled Felix Magath’s expert chip. As late as the 77th minute, when the game was losing what edge it had, Bernd Krauss broke into the box and forced a desperate clearance from Hans-Peter Briegel. A goal then would have put West Germany out." Almost all participants denied an outright agreement to fix the match. Austrian player Reinhold Hintermaier described the situation on the pitch as follows: "It somehow took on a life of its own – everyone just thought that they wanted to get ahead."

== Similar cases in football ==
- Coventry City 2–2 Bristol City, the final match for both sides in the 1976–77 season of English First Division. With five minutes remaining, players received news of a Sunderland defeat which meant a draw would save both Coventry and Bristol City from relegation. Both sides stopped attempting to score for those final five minutes.
- Uruguay 1–1 Argentina, played during the final matchday of CONMEBOL's qualification for the 2002 FIFA World Cup. Argentina had already secured qualification well in advance. On November 14, 2001, the national team visited the Estadio Centenario to play against Uruguay, who needed to eithe draw and hope that Colombia did not beat Paraguay by a margin of five goals or more in order to be in the playoff that would allow them to access the World Cup, or win outright which would see them qualify for the playoffs regardless of Colombia's results. The match ended 1–1 and Uruguay therefore secured their place in the next round against Australia, despite Colombia's 4–0 victory over Paraguay. The match was repeatedly accused by some of being fixed, as there were few attacks from either side in the final fifteen minutes. In 2004, Uruguayan Juan Ramón Carrasco confirmed a pact between both sides to allow Uruguay qualify to the World Cup, saying "it's common knowledge. Everyone here knows that they fixed the match to draw because Argentina had already qualified".
- Peru 1–1 Colombia, also known as the Pact of Lima, played during the final matchday of CONMEBOL's qualification for the 2018 FIFA World Cup. After reaching the 1–1 scoreline and learning that Chile (a rival for both in qualifying hopes) was losing 2–0 in Brazil, Peruvians and Colombians stopped attempting to score for the last fifteen minutes of the match. Colombia qualified directly, and Peru advanced to the inter-confederation play-offs, where they defeated New Zealand to qualify. Chile, who conceded a third goal by the Brazilians, were eliminated.
- Japan 0–1 Poland — In the third group stage match of the 2018 FIFA World Cup, Japan was losing 0–1 with 10 minutes to go. After seeing the situation in the other group stage match being held simultaneously, Senegal vs. Colombia, they realized that they could advance to the next round if they lost by the same score. At that point, Japan abandoned any attempt to equalize or win, and simply passed the ball around at the back. Poland also stopped trying to win the ball back and played listless football. They were booed in anger by the crowd.
- The 2024 AFC Women's Olympic Qualifying Tournament match between Uzbekistan and Japan, which ended in a 0–2 result, drew controversy due to allegations of match manipulation. Both teams, led by Japanese coaches, appeared to benefit from the outcome: Japan avoided a potential playoff against Australia, a formidable opponent, while Uzbekistan maintained a chance for a playoff berth due to the low scoreline. Japan scored two goals within the first 15 minutes, after which both teams exhibited notably passive play for the remaining 75 minutes, with no shots attempted by either side. This result effectively eliminated China from contention. Japan subsequently qualified for the 2024 Summer Olympics by defeating North Korea in a playoff match. Japan set a new world record for passes in this match: 1,466. This significantly surpasses the previous record of 1,033 passes, set by Bayern Munich in a Bundesliga match in 2014. The crowd demanded that both teams stop the match-fixing. However, both teams ignored them and continued playing listless football. When the second half started, both teams continued playing listless football without any change. As a result, the crowd became angry and began to leave in droves within the first few minutes of the second half, with 1500 out of 2000 leaving.
- Algeria 3–3 Austria. Two of the teams involved in the original Disgrace of Gijón next met in the final set of games of the group stage of 2026 World Cup, 44 years later. Due to the results of the other groups, both teams entered the game knowing that a draw would see them both qualify, with Austria in second place and Algeria as one of the eight best third-placed teams, at the expense of Iran; had either team lost, Iran would have qualified in the place of the loser. Despite the spectre of Gijón — the media had been concerned about a potential "Disgrace of Kansas City" before the match — Austria and Algeria played to a spirited 3–3 draw. The score was tied at 2–2 in the second half, with the teams starting to play more cautiously, before a goal for each team in injury time proving decisive for both countries' further qualification. In post-match interviews, both coaches denied there had been any collusion.

== See also ==
- Austria at the FIFA World Cup
- Germany at the FIFA World Cup
