= 1982 FIFA World Cup final =

World Cup final, held in Spain

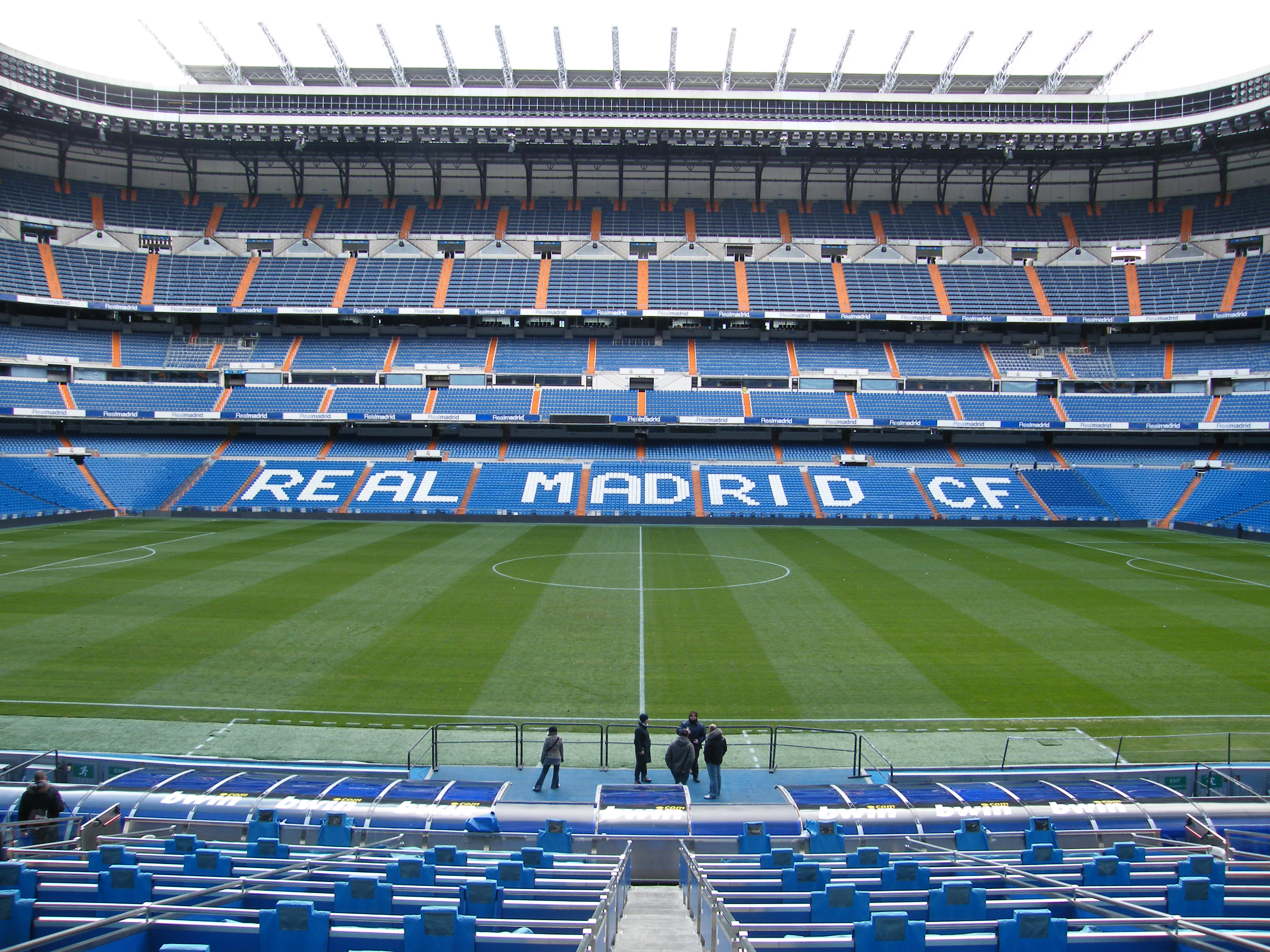
- The Bernabéu (pictured in 2009) held the final
- Event: 1982 FIFA World Cup
Italy	West Germany
3	1
- Date: 11 July 1982
- Venue: Santiago Bernabéu, Madrid
- Referee: Arnaldo Cézar Coelho (Brazil)
- Attendance: 90,089

The final match of the 1982 FIFA World Cup, the twelfth edition of FIFA's competition for men's national football teams, was played at the Bernabéu in Madrid, Spain, on 11 July 1982, and was contested by Italy and West Germany.

The tournament featured host Spain and defending champions Argentina, as well as 22 other teams who emerged from the qualification phase, organized by the six FIFA confederations. The 24 teams completed in the first group stage, in which 12 teams qualified for the second group stage, before four teams advanced to the knockout stage. En route to the final, Italy finished second in Group 1, which included Poland, Peru, and Cameroon, before defeating Argentina and Brazil in Group C and Poland in the semi-final. West Germany finished atop Group 2, which included Algeria, Chile, and Austria, before drawing against England and winning against host Spain in Group B and defeating France in a penalty shoot-out in the semi-final.

The final took place in front of 90,089 supporters, and was referred by Arnaldo Cézar Coelho from Brazil. After a goalless first half, Italy took the lead in the 57th minute when Paolo Rossi scored from Claudio Gentile's cross. Twelve minutes later, Marco Tardelli scored in the top corner to double their lead, before Alessandro Altobelli added a third goal from a cross by Bruno Conti. Seven minutes before the end of regular time, Paul Breitner scored from close range to pull a goal back for West Germany. The final score was 3–1 for Italy.

Italy's win was their fourth World Cup title—following previous victories in 1934 and 1938—the latter of which they hosted. Paolo Rossi was awarded the Golden Boot and the Golden Ball, FIFA's awards for both the top scorer and the best player of the tournament, respectively.

== Background ==
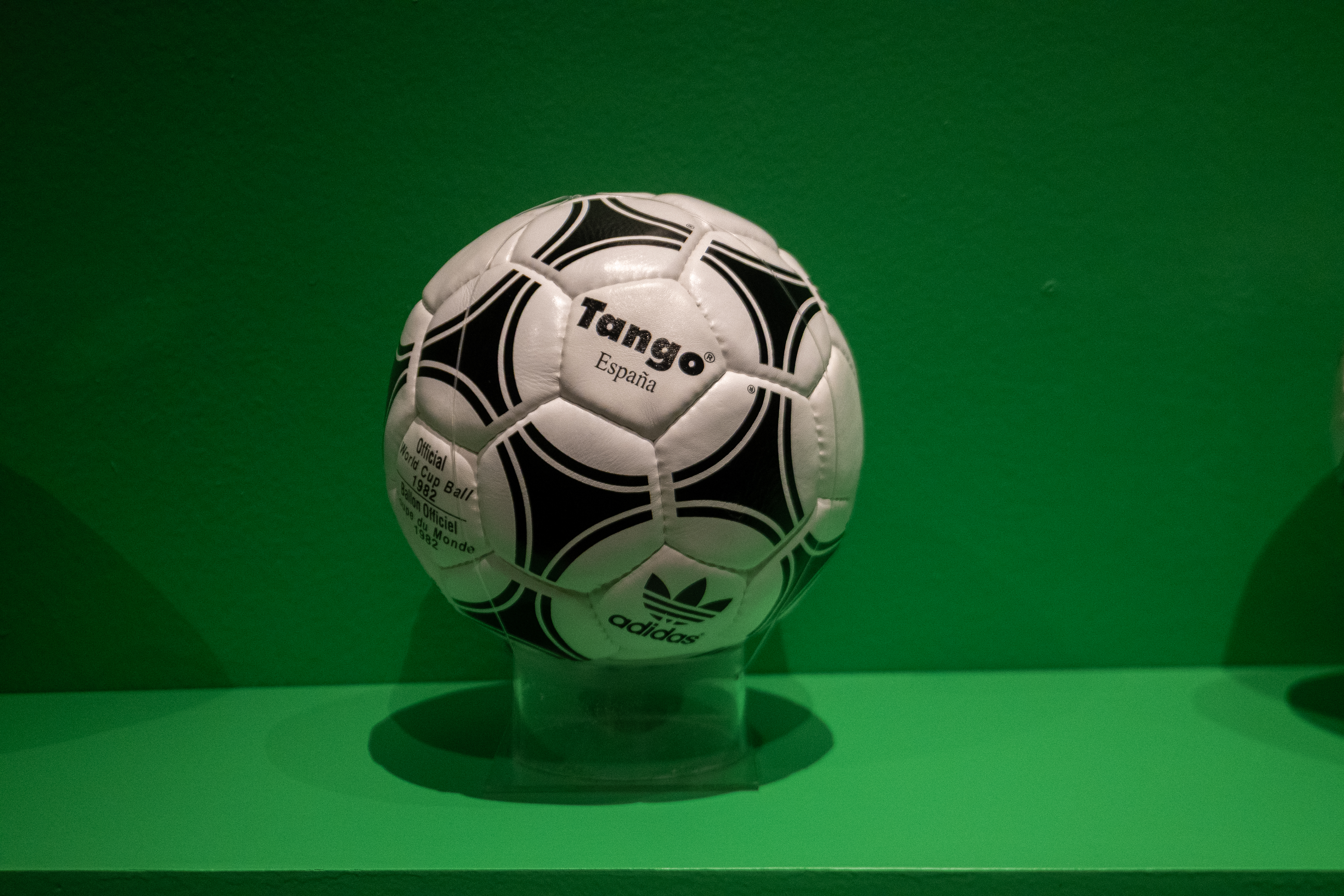
An example of the Tango España used in the match.

The 1982 FIFA World Cup was the twelfth edition of the World Cup, FIFA's football competition for national teams, held in Spain between 13 June and 11 July 1982. The finals featured 24 teams for the first time, up from 16 in the 1978 World Cup. Spain and Argentina qualified automatically for the finals — Spain as hosts and Argentina as winners of the previous World Cup. The remaining 22 spots were decided through qualifying rounds held from March 1980 to January 1982, organized by the six FIFA confederations and involving 109 teams. In the finals, the teams were divided into six groups of four with each team playing each other once in a round-robin format. The top two teams from each group advanced to a second group stage, where the teams were divided into four groups of three. The winner from each group progressed to the knockout stage. Defending champions Argentina were eliminated in the second group stage of the tournament.

The final was played at the Bernabéu, also known as Santiago Bernabéu Stadium, in Madrid, Spain. The stadium first opened in 1947 as Estadio Real Madrid Clubas as a replacement for Estadio Chamartín (1920–1946). It had previously hosted the finals of the European Cup in 1957, 1969, and 1980, and the final of the 1964 European Nations' Cup, now called the UEFA European Championship. In preparation for the World Cup, the Bernabéu went through extensive renovations. Seating capacity was reduced from its peak of 125,000 seats in 1955 to an estimated 98,776. A modern scoreboard was installed, while a new metal canopy was placed above three quarters of the stadium's seats.

Italy had won the title twice in 1934 and 1938, while West Germany had claimed two titles in 1954 and 1974. The two sides had met each other seventeen times, their first encounter taking place at a friendly match in January 1923, which Italy won 3–1. They had met three times previously at the World Cup–at the group stage of the 1962 tournament, which finished 0–0; the semi-final in 1970, which Italy won 4–3; and the second group stage of the 1978 tournament, which finished 0–0. At the previous World Cup, Italy advanced to the match for third place but lost 2–1 by Brazil, while Argentina progressed to the final, where they beat the Netherlands 3–1. The match ball used for the tournament was the Tango España, used specifically for the World Cup. The first to include a mix of real feathers and synthetic fiber, the ball was coated with polyurethane to withstand water.

== Route to the final ==
=== Italy ===
Italy's route to the final
	Opponent	Result
1	Poland	0–0
2	Peru	1–1
3	Cameroon	1–1
4	Argentina	2–1
5	Brazil	3–2
SF	Poland	2–0

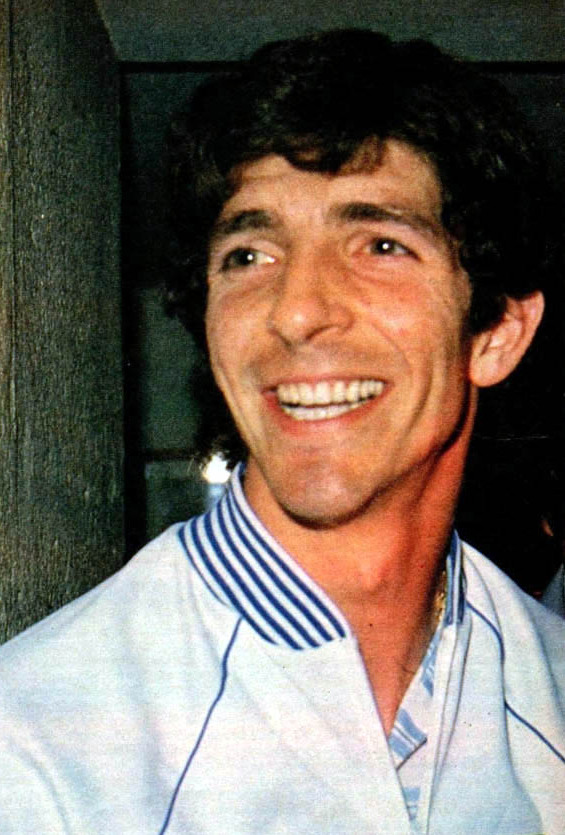
Paolo Rossi (pictured in 1982) scored a hat-trick in the match against Brazil.

After qualifying for the tournament as Group 5 winners in the European qualifiers, Italy were drawn into Group 1, in which they were joined by Poland, Peru, and Cameroon. Their first match was against Poland at the Balaídos Stadium in Vigo on June 14. Both teams had multiple chances to score during the game; in the 81st minute, Italy's Marco Tardelli took a goal-bound shot, but it struck the crossbar. The match ended in a scoreless draw, owing to weak shooting and several saves by both goalkeepers. Their second match was against Peru in Vigo on June 18. In the 19th minute, Bruno Conti hit a left-footed shot outside the penalty area into the goal to give Italy the lead. Peru equalized in the 83rd minute when Rubén Toribio Díaz struck a shot that deflected off Tardelli and into the Italian goal, and the match ended 1–1. Their third match was against World Cup debutants Cameroon in Vigo on June 23. After a goalless first half, Italy took the lead in the 60th minute when Francesco Graziani headed the ball from Paolo Rossi's pass that went over goalkeeper Thomas N'Kono and into the goal. A minute later, Ibrahim Aoudou and Grégoire M'Bida passed a long ball into the penalty area, where M'Bida shot it past goalkeeper Dino Zoff and into the Italian goal to level the score. The match ended in a 1–1 draw.

Italy entered Group C in the second group stage, the first match of which was against defending champions Argentina at Sarrià Stadium in Barcelona on June 29. After a goalless first half, Italy took the lead in the 56th minute when Tardelli received Giancarlo Antognoni's pass and hit a shot into the corner of the net. Argentina had two chances to score in the 66th minute when Diego Maradona took a free kick that hit the goalpost before Zoff bounced Daniel Passarella's header off the goalpost. A minute later, Antonio Cabrini scored from a rebound that had been flicked on by Conti after goalkeeper Ubaldo Fillol had saved Rossi's shot. With seven minutes remaining before the end of regular time, Passarella took a left-footed shot from a free kick to pull a goal back for Argentina. Italy held on to a 2–1 victory. Italy's opponents in their second and final group game were Brazil, with the match played in Barcelona on July 5. Italy took the lead after five minutes when Cabrini crossed the ball to Rossi, who headed in from the far post. Seven minutes later, Sócrates passed the ball to Zico, who returned it into the penalty area from the right, where Sócrates scored past Gaetano Scirea and into the Italian goal to equalize for Brazil. In the 25th minute, Rossi intercepted Toninho Cerezo's pass and ran to the edge of the penalty area to strike a 20 yards (18 m) shot into the goal to regain the lead for Italy. In the 68th minute, Paulo Roberto Falcão received Léo Júnior's pass and hit a left-footed shot into the goal. However, in the 75th minute, Rossi received Tardelli's volley and hit a 4 yards (3 m) shot to complete a hat-trick and seal a 3–2 victory for Italy. In the semi-final, Italy played Poland at Camp Nou on July 8. Italy was given a free kick after Janusz Kupcewicz fouled Conti. Antognoni took the kick into the penalty area, where Rossi scored from close range in the 22nd minute. Rossi received Conti's cross at the far post and scored to seal a 2-0 victory for Italy.

=== West Germany ===
West Germany's route to the final
	Opponent	Result
1	Algeria	1–2
2	Chile	4–1
3	Austria	1–0
4	England	0–0
5	Spain	2–1
SF	France	3–3 (aet) (5–4 pen.)

West Germany qualified for the tournament as Group 1 winners in the European qualifiers. They were drawn into Group 2 for the World Cup, alongside Algeria, Chile, and Austria. Their first match was against World Cup debutants Algeria at El Molinón in Gijón on June 16. In the 54th minute, Lakhdar Belloumi took a shot that deflected off goalkeeper Harald Schumacher in the penalty area, where Rabah Madjer scored from the rebound to give Algeria the lead. Thirteen minutes later, Karl-Heinz Rummenigge equalized for West Germany, before Belloumi scored the winning goal a minute later to give Algeria a 2–1 victory. Their second match was against Chile in Gijón on June 20. West Germany took the lead after nine minutes when Rummenigge scored from an error by goalkeeper Mario Osbén. In the 57th minute, Rummenigge doubled their lead, scoring from a cross by Pierre Littbarski, before hitting a shot from Lothar Matthäus's pass five minutes later to complete a hat-trick. With nine minutes remaining, Uwe Reinders, who had come on as a substitute in the second half, scored to extend West Germany's lead, before Gustavo Moscoso pulled back a goal for Chile in the 90th minute. West Germany held on to a 4–1 victory. Their third match was against opponents Austria, with the match played in Gijón on June 25. Horst Hrubesch scored the only goal of the game after eleven minutes when he struck Littbarski's cross into the Austrian goal.

Italy advanced to Group B in the second group stage, the first match of which was against England at the Bernabéu in Madrid on June 29. The match ended in a goalless draw. Their second and final group game was against host Spain on July 2. After a goalless first half, West Germany took the lead through Littbarski, who scored from a rebound after goalkeeper Luis Arconada had saved Wolfgang Dremmler's shot. Klaus Fischer scored midway through the second half to double West Germany's lead, before Jesús María Zamora pulled a goal back with a header seven minutes later. West Germany's opponents in the semi-final were France, with the match played at the Ramón Sánchez-Pizjuán Stadium on July 8. West Germany took the lead after eighteen minutes when Littbarski scored a low-driven shot into the French goal after goalkeeper Jean-Luc Ettori had saved Paul Breitner's shot. In the 28th minute, Michel Platini scored from a penalty to equalize the score for France, before Marius Trésor scored from Alain Giresse's free kick in the second minute of the first period of extra time. Seven minutes later, Giresse struck a shot that bounced off the goalpost and into the goal to extend France's lead. In the 13th minute of first-half extra time, Rummenigge scored from close range for West Germany, before Fischer scored a 10 yards (9 m) shot after receiving Hrubesch's header five minutes later to level the score. The match remained tied at 3–3, resulting in a penalty shoot-out—the first in a World Cup match. France's Giresse and Manuel Amoros and West Germany's Manfred Kaltz and Breitner took their respective penalty shots to tie the shootout 2–2. After Dominique Rocheteau scored for West Germany, Uli Stielike took the fourth one for West Germany, which goalkeeper Ettori saved, before Didier Six took his penalty shot that was saved by goalkeeper Toni Schumacher. Maxime Bossis took his penalty shot, which was saved by Schumacher, before Hrubesch scored to give West Germany a 5–4 shootout win.

== Match ==
=== Pre-match ===
The final was both Italy's and West Germany's fourth appearance, in which both of them were seeking to claim their third title to match three-time champions Brazil. Before the match, Italy was the bookmakers' favorite, with odds of 8–11 to win the tournament. On the other hand, West Germany had an undefeated streak by any European team with 33 matches. Arnaldo Cézar Coelho from Brazil was named the referee of the final by FIFA administrator Artemio Franchi. At the 1982 World Cup, he had previously refereed the West Germany–Austria and West Germany–England matches and also served as an assistant referee in the England–France and Algeria–Chile matches.

=== Summary ===
The final took place on 11 July 1982 at the Bernabéu in front of 90,089 supporters. In the seventh minute, Francesco Graziani suffered an injury in his right shoulder and went off, with Alessandro Altobelli, replacing him. In the 24th minute, Italy was awarded a penalty after Hans-Peter Briegel fouled Bruno Conti. Antonio Cabrini took the kick but went wide of the goal, before Conti was booked for a foul on Klaus Fischer, and the first half ended goalless. In the 57th minute, Italy was given a free kick after Karl-Heinz Rummenigge fouled Gabriele Oriali near the midfield. Claudio Gentile crossed the ball to the right side, where Paolo Rossi met with a header past Toni Schumacher into the German goal to give Italy the lead.

After Wolfgang Dremmler tackled Gabriele Oriali, Giuseppe Bergomi struck the ball to the edge of the penalty area, where Tardelli scored with a left-footed drive shot into the top corner to double Italy's lead in the 69th minute. Germany made a substitution with Hansi Müller coming on in place of Rummenigge, before Gabriele Oriali and Uli Stielike were booked in the 73rd minute after getting into an argument. Eight minutes later, Altobelli received Conti's pass and scored to extend their lead, before Paul Breitner pulled a goal back for West Germany, scoring from close range. Italy held on to claim its first World Cup title in 44 years and its third overall.

=== Details ===
11 July 1982
20:00 CEST

Italy	3–1	West Germany
Rossi 57'; Tardelli 69'; Altobelli 81'		Breitner 83'

Santiago Bernabéu, Madrid
Attendance: 90,000
Referee: Arnaldo Cézar Coelho (Brazil)

Italy	West Germany

GK	1	Dino Zoff (c)
SW	7	Gaetano Scirea
RB	3	Giuseppe Bergomi
CB	6	Claudio Gentile
CB	5	Fulvio Collovati
LB	4	Antonio Cabrini
DM	13	Gabriele Oriali	(yellow card) 73'
CM	14	Marco Tardelli
RW	16	Bruno Conti	(yellow card) 31'
LW	19	Francesco Graziani		(substituted off) 7'
CF	20	Paolo Rossi
Substitutions:
GK	12	Ivano Bordon
MF	10	Giuseppe Dossena
MF	11	Gianpiero Marini
MF	15	Franco Causio			(substituted on) 89'
FW	18	Alessandro Altobelli		(substituted on) 7'	(substituted off) 89'
Manager:
Enzo Bearzot

GK	1	Harald Schumacher
SW	15	Uli Stielike	(yellow card) 73'
RB	20	Manfred Kaltz
CB	4	Karlheinz Förster
CB	5	Bernd Förster
LB	2	Hans-Peter Briegel
CM	6	Wolfgang Dremmler	(yellow card) 61'	(substituted off) 62'
CM	3	Paul Breitner
RW	11	Karl-Heinz Rummenigge (c)		(substituted off) 70'
LW	7	Pierre Littbarski	(yellow card) 88'
CF	8	Klaus Fischer
Substitutions:
GK	21	Bernd Franke
FW	9	Horst Hrubesch		(substituted on) 62'
MF	10	Hansi Müller		(substituted on) 70'
DF	12	Wilfried Hannes
MF	14	Felix Magath
Manager:
Jupp Derwall

Linesmen:
Abraham Klein (Israel)
Vojtech Christov (Czechoslovakia)

Match rules:

- 90 minutes
- 30 minutes of extra-time if necessary
- Replay on 13 July if scores still level
- Five substitutes named, of which two may be used

== Post-match ==
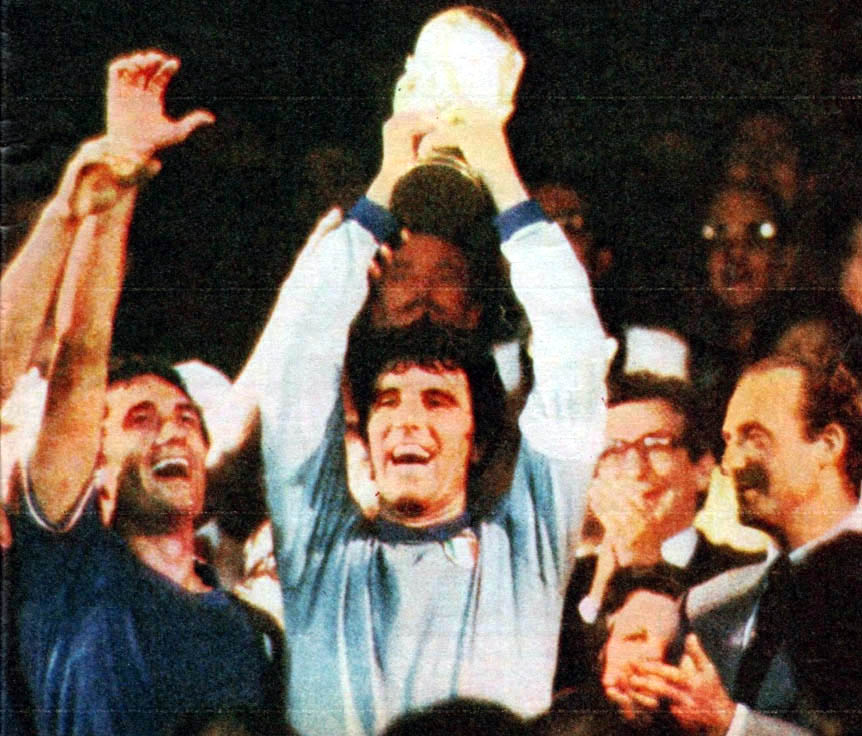
Dino Zoff holding the FIFA World Cup Trophy while celebrating their victory.

With their victory, Italy secured their first World Cup title in 44 years—since 1938 and 1934—and their third overall, meaning that they tied Brazil with the most titles. They also became the first European team to defeat West Germany and end their four-year undefeated streak. Referring to their defeat, Klaus Fischer stated that "[he] was so close to becoming a world champion, and getting the title [he] still am missing from [his] collection." Italian manager Enzo Bearzot described their win as "the happiest day of [his] life", noting his multi-year efforts. Paolo Rossi received the Golden Boot, FIFA's award for the tournament's top goalscorer, and the Golden Ball, FIFA's award for the player they considered the best. He won the latter award with 437 votes—nearly twice—as Brazil's Paulo Roberto Falcão's 254 votes and West Germany's Karl-Heinz Rummenigge's 207 votes. Juan Carlos I, the Monarchy of Spain, handed the FIFA World Cup Trophy to Dino Zoff.

Celebrations broke out throughout Italy, including 300,000 people in Rome. Amid the party in central Rome, various vehicle accidents occurred, and an estimated 20 people suffered heart attacks. In Toronto, Canada, roughly 500,000 Italian immigrants celebrated with numerous street parties.

== See also ==
- Germany at the FIFA World Cup
- Italy at the FIFA World Cup
