= Hocine Yahi =

Algerian footballer (born 1960)

Personal information
- Full name: Hocine Yahi
- Date of birth: April 25, 1960 (age 66)
- Place of birth: El Madania, Algiers, Algeria
- Height: 1.80 m (5 ft 11 in)
- Position: Midfielder

Youth career
- 1971–1978: CR Belouizdad

Senior career*
Years	Team	Apps	(Gls)
1978–1990	CR Belouizdad	-	(-)
1990–1991	Linfield	-	(-)

International career
1978–1979	Algeria U20	12	(4)
1979–1989	Algeria	56	(8)
- * Club domestic league appearances and goals

Hocine Yahi (born April 25, 1960) is a retired Algerian international footballer who played as a midfielder. He represented Algeria at the 1982 FIFA World Cup.

== Club career ==
At age 11, Yahi joined his hometown club of CR Belouizdad, where he would go on to spend his entire domestic career. During his time with the club, he won the Algerian Cup in 1978 defeating USM Alger 2–0 on penalties in the final.

In 1990, he signed with Northern Irish club Linfield F.C., with whom he won the Gold Cup and reached the final of the 1990 Floodlit Cup during his brief stint with the club.

== International career ==
Yahi played for Algeria at the 1979 FIFA World Youth Championship in Japan, where he started in all four of Algeria's games and scored a goal in the opener against Mexico, which ended 1-1.

Yahi played for Algeria at the African Cup of Nations in four tournaments: 1982, 1984, 1986 and 1988. In four tournaments, he made 16 appearances and scored 1 goal.

In 1980, Yahi was a member of the Algerian squad at the 1980 Summer Olympics in Moscow. However, he did not make any appearances as Algeria lost 3–0 to Yugoslavia in the quarter-finals.

Yahi was a member of the Algerian squad at the 1982 FIFA World Cup in Spain. However, he made just one appearance as a substitute in the final group game against Chile, replacing Abdelmajid Bourebbou in the 31st minute. Algeria went on to win the game 3–2.

== Honours ==
- Won the Algerian Cup once with CR Belouizdad in 1978
- Won the Northern Irish Gold Cup in 1990
