= Vladimir Bigorra =

Chilean footballer (born 1954)

Personal information
- Full name: Vladimir David Bigorra López
- Date of birth: 9 August 1954 (age 72)
- Place of birth: Santiago, Chile
- Height: 1.82 m (6 ft 0 in)
- Position: Defender

Senior career*
Years	Team	Apps	(Gls)
1972–1983	Universidad de Chile	377	(8)
1984–1990	Cobresal	192	(3)
Total		569	(11)

International career
1974	Chile U20		
1974–1987	Chile	21	(1)

Managerial career
- 1995–1998: Chile U17
- 1999: Chile U20
- 2000–2001: Deportes Puerto Montt
- 2004–2005: Universidad de Chile (assistant)
- 2007: Unión Española (assistant)
- 2008–2009: Universidad de Chile (youth)
- 2010–2017: Unión Española (youth)
- 2016: Unión Española (interim)
- 2018–2019: Universidad de Chile (youth)
- 2021–: Unión Española (youth)
- * Club domestic league appearances and goals

Vladimir David Bigorra López (born August 9, 1954) is a retired football defender from Chile, who represented his native country at the 1982 FIFA World Cup, wearing the number four jersey. After his active football career Bigorra became a football manager.

== Career ==
During his entire career, he played for only two clubs: Universidad de Chile and Cobresal.

After he retired from playing in 1992, Bigorra spent several years coaching the Chile national team at various youth levels. He enjoyed success, leading the Chile national under-17 football team to the 1997 FIFA U-17 World Championship finals in Egypt.

Bigorra would later manage Chilean clubs, including Deportes Puerto Montt during 2001.

As a coach for the Unión Española youth ranks, Bigorra assumed as interim coach for the first team in 2016.
