= Rodolfo Dubó =

Chilean footballer (born 1953)

Personal information
- Full name: Rodolfo Dubó Segovia
- Date of birth: 11 September 1953 (age 73)
- Place of birth: Punitaqui, Chile
- Height: 1.77 m (5 ft 9 1/2 in)
- Position: Midfielder

Youth career
- Deportes Ovalle

Senior career*
Years	Team	Apps	(Gls)
1972–1974	Deportes Ovalle		
1975–1983	Palestino	232	(20)
1983–1984	Universidad de Chile	45	(1)
1985–1988	Palestino	113	(4)
1989	Lozapenco	–	(–)

International career
1977–1985	Chile	46	(3)

Managerial career
- 1997–1998: Barnechea
- 2000: Unión La Calera
- 2001: Deportes Melipilla
- 2001–2002: San Luis de Quillota
- 2004–2007: Chile U20 (assistant)
- * Club domestic league appearances and goals

Rodolfo Dubó Segovia (born September 11, 1953) is a retired football midfielder from Chile, who represented his native country at the 1982 FIFA World Cup, wearing the number six jersey. He played for Club Deportivo Palestino and Universidad de Chile. He played 46 matches for his country scoring 3 goals between 1977 and 1985.
