= Bob Valentine (referee) =

Scottish football referee (born 1939)

- Born: 10 May 1939 (age 87); Dundee, Scotland
- Occupation: Referee

Robert Bonar Valentine (born 10 May 1939) is a Scottish former football referee. He is mostly known for refereeing two matches in the 1982 World Cup in Spain: the infamous "Great Gijon Swindle" between West Germany and Austria, and the second-round match between Poland and the Soviet Union.

He was also one of the linesmen (the other was Bruno Galler) for the classic semi-final that year between France and West Germany at the Estadio Sanchez Pizjuan in Seville.

Valentine also refereed the Euro 84 match between France and Belgium at the Stade de la Beaujoire in Nantes, and the Euro 88 match between West Germany and Denmark at the Parkstadion in Gelsenkirchen.

After his refereeing retirement, Valentine became the Scottish FA's Head of Refereeing. Outside of football, he worked as a print compositor.
