= Noureddine Kourichi =

Footballer (born 1954)

Nourredine Kourichi
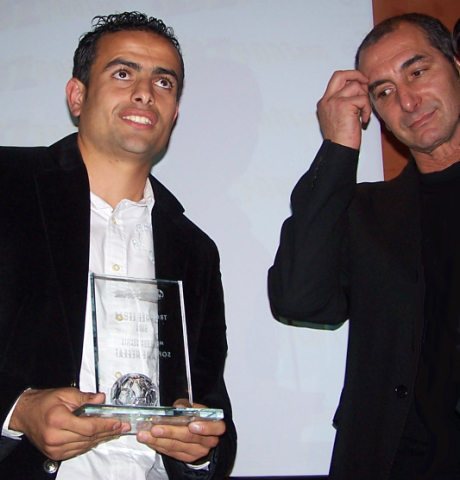
- Kourichi (right) in 2006, presenting an award to Sofiane Harkat

Personal information
- Full name: Noureddine Abdallah Kourichi
- Date of birth: 12 April 1954 (age 72)
- Place of birth: Ostricourt, France
- Height: 1.92 m (6 ft 4 in)
- Position: Defender

Senior career*
Years	Team	Apps	(Gls)
1974–1976	Poissy	?	(?)
1976–1981	Valenciennes	109	(11)
1981–1982	Bordeaux	22	(1)
1982–1986	Lille	94	(1)
1986–1987	FC Martigny-Sports	?	(?)
1988–1989	AS Bayeux	?	(?)

International career
1980–1986	Algeria	30	(2)
- * Club domestic league appearances and goals

Noureddine Abdallah Kourichi (born 12 April 1954) is a former footballer who played as a defender. Born in France, he played for the Algeria national team.

== International career ==
Kourichi was an important member of the Algerian national team at the 1982 FIFA World Cup in Spain and the 1986 FIFA World Cup in Mexico, starting five out of the six games. He played 30 games for the national team, scoring twice.

Noureddine Kourichi was interviewed in July 2026 following Algeria's elimination from the 2026 FIFA World Cup. He discussed the team's performance, criticised the lack of tactical continuity under head coach Vladimir Petković and highlighted the importance of improving player and coaching development in Algerian football. Kourichi also shared his views on the profile of a future Algeria national team coach, stressing that competence and qualifications should be prioritised over nationality.
