= Faouzi Mansouri =

Algerian footballer (1956–2022)

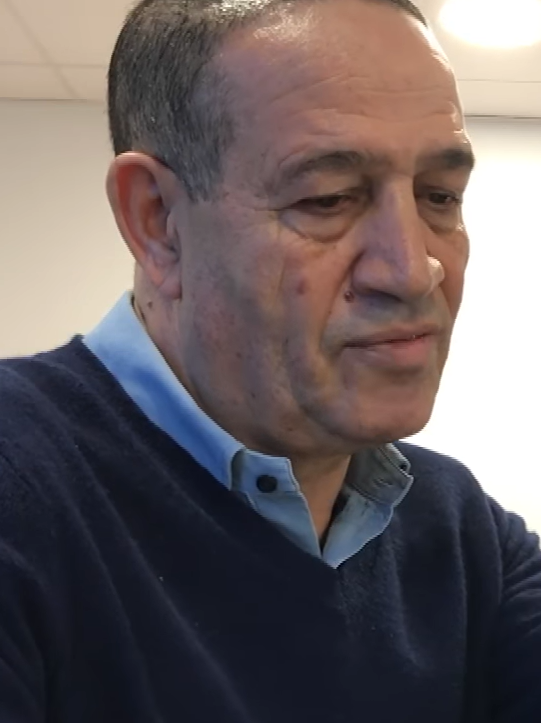
- Mansouri in 2019

Personal information
- Date of birth: 17 January 1956
- Place of birth: Menzel, Djerba, French Protectorate of Tunisia, France
- Date of death: 18 May 2022 (aged 66)
- Place of death: Nîmes, France
- Height: 1.76 m (5 ft 9 in)
- Position: Defender

Youth career
- Nîmes

Senior career*
Years	Team	Apps	(Gls)
1975–1980	Nîmes	65	(3)
1980–1981	AS Béziers	25	(5)
1981–1983	Montpellier	43	(1)
1983–1985	Mulhouse	58	(0)
1985–1986	Montpellier	16	(0)
Total		207	(9)

International career
1981–1986	Algeria	13	(0)
- * Club domestic league appearances and goals

Faouzi Mansouri (Arabic: فوزي منصوري; 17 January 1956 – 18 May 2022) was an Algerian professional footballer who played as a defender. He played mostly in France with Montpellier. For the Algeria national team he participated at two editions of FIFA World Cup, in 1982 and 1986.

== Honours ==
Nîmes

- Coupe Gambardella: 1977

Algeria

- Africa Cup of Nations: third place 1984
