= Djamel Tlemçani =

Algerian footballer (born 1955)

Personal information
- Date of birth: 16 April 1955 (age 71)
- Place of birth: Médéa, Algeria
- Height: 1.77 m (5 ft 9 1/2 in)
- Position: Midfielder

Youth career
- –: OM Medea

Senior career*
| Years | Team | Apps | (Gls) |
| 1973–1979 | CR Belcourt | | |
| 1979–1982 | Reims | 75 | (31) |
| 1982–1984 | Rouen | 61 | (18) |
| 1984–1985 | Toulon | 23 | (2) |
| 1985–1986 | La Chaux-de-Fonds | 11 | (1) |
| 1986–1987 | Stade Quimpérois | 18 | (10) |
| 1987–1988 | Rennes | 22 | (5) |
| 1988–1989 | US Villecresnes | | |
| 1989–1990 | Lorient | 8 | (0) |

International career
| 1982–1985 | Algeria | 26 | (3) |
- * Club domestic league appearances and goals

Djamel Tlemçani (born 16 April 1955) is a former Algerian international footballer who played as a midfielder for several French and Swiss clubs. He played for the Algeria national team and was a member of the national squad at the 1982 FIFA World Cup.

== Honours ==
- Algerian Cup winner in 1978 with CR Belcourt
