= Felix Latzke =

Austrian footballer and manager

Personal information
- Date of birth: February 1, 1942 (age 84)
- Place of birth: Vienna, Germany
- Position: Striker

Senior career*
| Years | Team | Apps | (Gls) |
| 1964–1966 | Admira Energie | | |

Managerial career
- 1974–1976: LASK Linz
- 1977–1978: VOEST Linz
- 1979–1983: FC Admira/Wacker Vienna
- 1982: Austria
- 1984–1985: SC Eisenstadt
- 1985–1987: Wacker Innsbruck
- 1987–1988: Waldhof Mannheim
- 1989–1990: VfB Mödling
- 1990–1991: First Vienna FC
- 1991–1992: Vorwärts Steyr
- 1992–1993: Stahl Linz
- 1997: Wiener Sport-Club
- 2001–2002: SC Ostbahn XI
- 2004–2005: SC Neudörfl
- 2006: SC Eisenstadt
- * Club domestic league appearances and goals

Felix Latzke (born 1 February 1942, in Vienna) is an Austrian former football player and manager. He was the co-manager of the Austria national football team in the 1982 FIFA World Cup, with Georg Schmidt. That tournament included West Germany v Austria (1982), in which the teams were widely believed to have conspired to engineer a 0-1 loss to West Germany which ensured that both teams qualified for the group stages.
