= Pierre Littbarski =

German footballer and manager

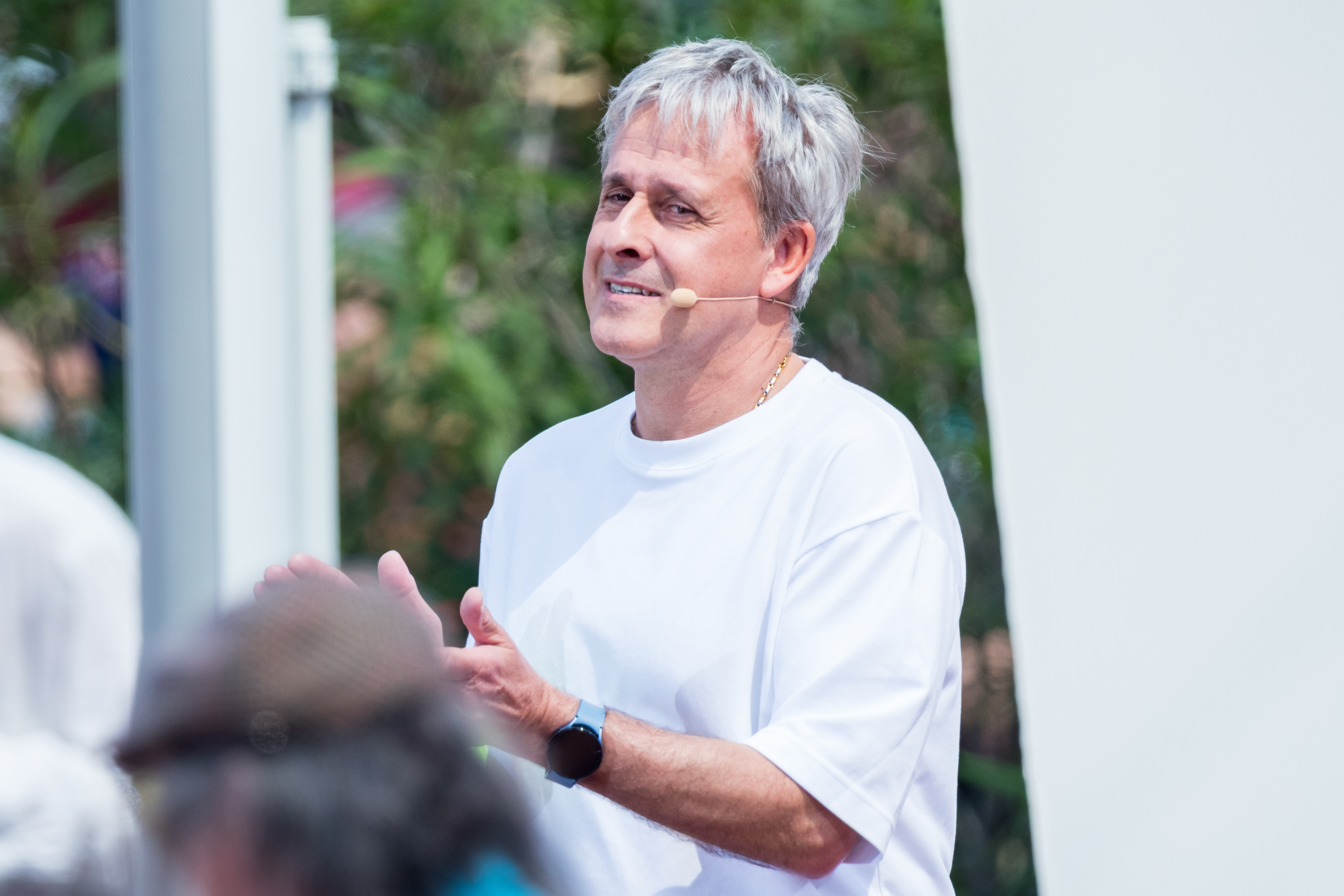
- Littbarski in 2023

Personal information
- Date of birth: 16 April 1960 (age 66)
- Place of birth: West Berlin, West Germany
- Height: 1.68 m (5 ft 6 in)
- Positions: Attacking midfielder; winger

Team information
- Current team: VfL Wolfsburg (lead scout)

Youth career
- 1967–1976: VfL Schöneberg
- 1976–1978: FC Hertha 03 Zehlendorf

Senior career*
Years	Team	Apps	(Gls)
1978–1986	1. FC Köln	234	(89)
1986–1987	RC Paris	34	(4)
1987–1993	1. FC Köln	172	(27)
1993–1994	JEF United Ichihara	63	(10)
1996–1997	Brummell Sendai	29	(5)
Total		532	(135)

International career
1979–1982	West Germany U-21	21	(18)
1980	West Germany B	1	(0)
1981–1990	West Germany	73	(18)

Managerial career
- 1999–2000: Yokohama FC
- 2001: Bayer Leverkusen (assistant)
- 2001–2002: MSV Duisburg
- 2003–2004: Yokohama FC
- 2005–2006: Sydney FC
- 2006–2008: Avispa Fukuoka
- 2008: Saipa
- 2008–2010: FC Vaduz
- 2010–2011: VfL Wolfsburg (assistant)
- 2011: VfL Wolfsburg (caretaker)
- 2011–2012: VfL Wolfsburg (assistant)
Medal record
Men's football
Representing West Germany
FIFA World Cup
Winner	1990
Runner-up	1982
Runner-up	1986
UEFA European Under-21 Championship
Runner-up	1982
- * Club domestic league appearances and goals

Pierre Littbarski (German pronunciation: [ˈpi̯ɛʁ lɪtˈbaʁskiː]; born 16 April 1960) is a German professional football manager and former player of 1. FC Köln and the West Germany national team. A diminutive player known for his dribbling abilities, he was mainly used as an attacking midfielder or winger. Littbarski was a FIFA World Cup winner with West Germany in 1990, and the runner-up in both 1982 and 1986. Littbarski was the caretaker manager of VfL Wolfsburg after taking over from Steve McClaren from 7 February to 17 March 2011.

== Club career ==
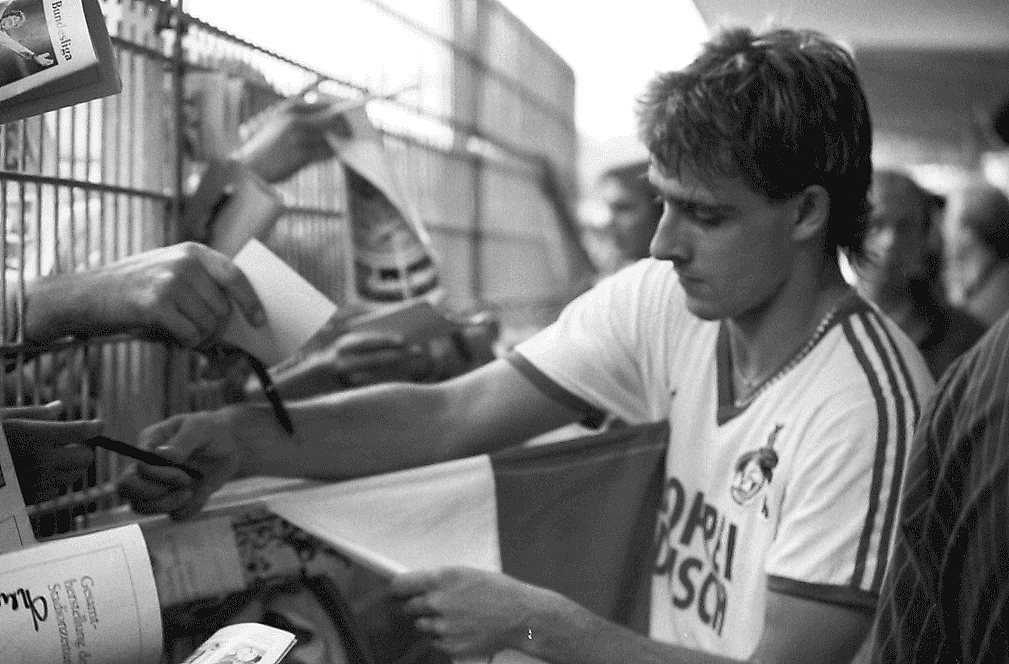
Littbarski with 1. FC Köln signing autographs in 1982

Littbarski spent most of his playing career at 1. FC Köln. He made his debut for the club, at the time coached by Hennes Weisweiler, at the age of 18. The stars on the team during Littbarski's first few years were goalkeeper Harald Schumacher, goal scorer Dieter Müller, and midfielder Bernd Schuster. Littbarski scored the winning goal in the 1983 DFB-Pokal final against Fortuna Köln. He was on teams that were three times the runner-up in the Bundesliga title chase, in 1982, 1989 and 1990. In his career, he was initially used as a deep-lying striker before being utilised as an attacking midfielder. Playing in the former role, in the four seasons from 1981 to 1985 he scored 64 league goals in 128 Bundesliga games. "Litti", as he was nicknamed by German fans, was widely known for his excellent dribbling abilities and humorous attitude, and was one of the fan favourites in the West German Bundesliga during the decade. In 1985 his goal versus Werder Bremen was elected "Goal of the Year". He later played for RC Paris in Ligue 1 as well as for JEF United Ichihara and Brummel Sendai in Japan.

== International career ==
Littbarski had a prolific but short career as part of the West German Under-21 side. He was a part of the squad that got to the 1982 UEFA European Under-21 Championship final. The team lost to England 5–4 after a two-leg final (losing 1–3 away and winning 3–2 at home). Littbarski scored a hat-trick against the English in West Germany, but ultimately they lost the tie. Littbarski has the most goals on the Under-21 Germany squad in the team's history.

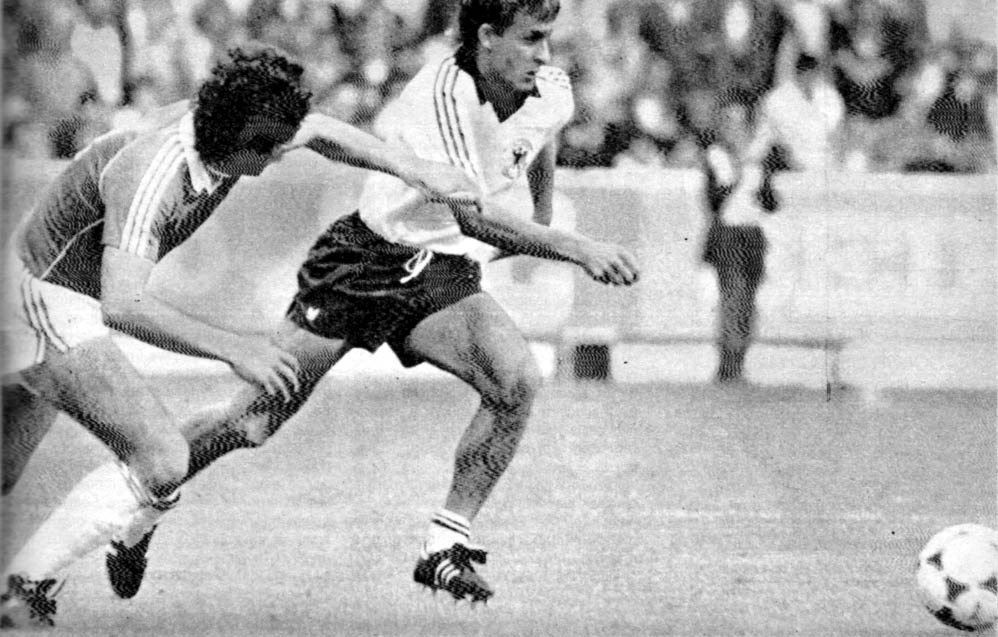
Littbarski (foreground) against Chile at the 1982 World Cup

Littbarski earned his first cap for West Germany on 14 October 1981 in the 1982 World Cup qualification against Austria. West Germany manager Jupp Derwall started him in a three-man front line alongside Klaus Fischer and Karl-Heinz Rummenigge. Littbarski's international career got off to a promising start, as he scored his first and second goals in that game. His third international goal came at the 1982 World Cup, in the second round match against Spain, a 2–1 victory. Against France in the semi-final, Littbarski scored the opening goal, and later was successful on a penalty in the deciding shoot-out. The now legendary match ended in a 3–3 draw, with Littbarski involved in the dramatic extra-time equalizer, crossing to Horst Hrubesch, who headed to Klaus Fischer, who scored with an overhead bicycle kick. Littbarski had minutes earlier provided the pass that Rummenigge scored from to cut France's lead to 3–2. A poignant scene in the penalty shootout showed the young Littbarski consoling a tearful Uli Stielike, who had just missed a penalty and had buried his head in Littbarski's shirt, while watching West Germany's goalkeeper, Harald Schumacher, save Didier Six's penalty to even the score. West Germany eventually won 5–4 on penalties. West Germany lost 3–1 to Italy in the final. Littbarski played the whole match, receiving a yellow card in the 88th minute.

At the UEFA Euro 1984, West Germany, with Littbarski, were eliminated in the group stage after a string of poor performances. The 1986 FIFA World Cup in Mexico, while successful for West Germany, proved less so for Littbarski personally. He was benched by manager Franz Beckenbauer, and had to watch the semi–final and final from the bench. West Germany again finished as runners–up, losing 3–2 to Argentina. In 1987, he played in a friendly match against England and scored two goals, one directly from a corner, as the West Germans won 3-1.

The West German players had high hopes for the UEFA Euro 1988 on their home soil. However, the hosts lost 2–1 to the Netherlands in the semi–finals. Littbarski did not score any goals in the tournament. In 1990, Littbarski enjoyed a successful final appearance at the FIFA World Cup, as West Germany won their third title, defeating Argentina 1–0 in the final in Rome. Littbarski scored his only goal in the group stage against Colombia but started three of the four games at the knockout stage, including the final.

== Managerial career ==
In 1999, he started his coaching career with Yokohama FC of Japan Football League and he led the club to the promotion to J2 League. He has also been the manager of Yokohama FC (twice), as well as assistant manager of Bayer 04 Leverkusen and manager of MSV Duisburg.

=== Sydney FC ===
He was manager of Australian A-League side Sydney FC between 2005 and 2006, and led them to the FIFA Club World Championship in 2005, and a win in the inaugural A-League Championship.

He was famous amongst Sydney FC supporters and the media for his stylish brown suits. Sydney under Littbarski were criticised for boring football, but the results could seldom be argued with and Sydney FC went on to claim the inaugural A-League Championship under his reign. Littbarski and Sydney FC severed ties on Wednesday, 5 May 2006, with Littbarski announcing he would not re-sign for the club following disputes over a cut-price contract offer.

=== Avispa Fukuoka ===
In December 2006, Littbarski was appointed the manager of Avispa Fukuoka, a J2 League side that was newly demoted to the second division after the 2006 season. In July 2008, he left the club and was replaced by Yoshiyuki Shinoda.

=== Saipa F.C. ===
On 26 July 2008, it was announced that he became the new manager of Iranian side Saipa F.C. His contract was terminated on 8 October 2008 after nine games.

=== FC Vaduz ===
On 4 November 2008 he signed a contract as head coach and team manager of FC Vaduz. On 12 April 2010 he was dismissed due to lack of success.

=== VfL Wolfsburg ===
On 9 June 2010, Littbarski signed a two-year contract as assistant coach by VfL Wolfsburg. After Steve McClaren was sacked on 7 February 2011, Littbarski was appointed caretaker manager of VfL Wolfsburg. Felix Magath was subsequently made head coach in March 2011.

== Name ==
Littbarski has said that he was named "Pierre" because his parents loved France and, when thinking of a name for him, recalled their travels there.

== Career statistics ==
=== Club ===
Appearances and goals by club, season and competition
Club	Season	League			National Cup		League Cup		International		Total	
Club	Season	Division	Apps	Goals	Apps	Goals	Apps	Goals	Apps	Goals	Apps	Goals
1. FC Köln	1978–79	Bundesliga	16	4	2	1	–	-	3	1	21	6
1. FC Köln	1979–80	Bundesliga	34	7	8	2	–	-	–		42	9
1. FC Köln	1980–81	Bundesliga	32	6	3	0	–	-	9	3	44	9
1. FC Köln	1981–82	Bundesliga	33	15	1	0	–	-	–		34	15
1. FC Köln	1982–83	Bundesliga	34	16	6	2	-	-	5	1	45	19
1. FC Köln	1983–84	Bundesliga	33	17	3	1	–	-	4	1	40	19
1. FC Köln	1984–85	Bundesliga	28	16	2	1	–	-	8	3	38	20
1. FC Köln	1985–86	Bundesliga	24	8	2	0	–	-	9	4	35	12
1. FC Köln	Total		234	89	27	7	–		38	12	299	109
RCF Paris	1986–87	Division 1	32	4	1	1	–		–		33	5
RCF Paris	1987–88	Division 1	2	0	–		–		–		2	0
RCF Paris	Total		34	4	1	1	–		–		35	5
1. FC Köln	1987–88	Bundesliga	31	8	2	2					33	10
1. FC Köln	1988–89	Bundesliga	30	5	2	0			6	1	38	6
1. FC Köln	1989–90	Bundesliga	34	8	3	1			9	2	46	11
1. FC Köln	1990–91	Bundesliga	15	2	5	0					25	2
1. FC Köln	1991–92	Bundesliga	36	1	2	1					38	2
1. FC Köln	1992–93	Bundesliga	26	3	2	1			2	0	30	4
1. FC Köln	Total		172	27	16	5	0		17	3	240	35
JEF United Ichihara	1993	J1 League	35	9	3	2	6				44	11
JEF United Ichihara	1994	J1 League	28	1	0	0	2				30	1
JEF United Ichihara	Total		63	10	3	2	8				74	12
Brummell Sendai	1996	Football League	27	5	3	1	-				30	6
Brummell Sendai	1997	Football League	2	0	0	0	5				7	0
Brummell Sendai	Total		29	5	3	1	5				37	6
Career total			532	135	49	15	13		55	15	658	166

=== International ===
Appearances and goals by national team and year
National team	Year	Apps	Goals
West Germany	1981	2	3
West Germany	1982	15	5
West Germany	1983	8	0
West Germany	1984	3	0
West Germany	1985	10	4
West Germany	1986	7	0
West Germany	1987	6	3
West Germany	1988	8	0
West Germany	1989	4	2
West Germany	1990	10	1
Total		73	18

Scores and results list West Germany's goal tally first, score column indicates score after each Littbarski goal.

List of international goals scored by Pierre Littbarski
No.	Date	Venue	Opponent	Score	Result	Competition
1	14 October 1981	Praterstadion, Vienna	Austria	1–1	3–1	1982 World Cup qualifier
2	14 October 1981	Praterstadion, Vienna	Austria	3–1	3–1	1982 World Cup qualifier
3	18 November 1981	Westfalenstadion, Dortmund	Albania	6–0	8–0	1982 World Cup qualifier
4	14 April 1982	Müngersdorferstadion, Cologne	Czechoslovakia	1–0	2–1	Friendly
5	12 May 1982	Ullevaal Stadion, Oslo	Norway	2–1	4–2	Friendly
6	12 May 1982	Ullevaal Stadion, Oslo	Norway	3–1	4–2	Friendly
7	2 July 1982	Santiago Bernabéu Stadium, Madrid	Spain	1–0	2–1	1982 World Cup
8	8 July 1982	Estadio Ramón Sánchez Pizjuán, Seville	France	1–0	3–3	1982 World Cup
9	24 February 1985	Estádio Nacional, Lisbon	Portugal	1–0	2–1	1986 World Cup qualifier
10	27 March 1985	Ludwigsparkstadion, Saarbrücken	Malta	4–0	6–0	1986 World Cup qualifier
11	17 April 1985	Rosenaustadion, Augsburg	Bulgaria	3–1	4–1	Friendly
12	30 April 1985	Strahov Stadium, Prague	Czechoslovakia	2–0	5–1	1986 World Cup qualifier
13	9 September 1987	Esprit Arena, Düsseldorf	England	1–0	3–1	Friendly
14	9 September 1987	Esprit Arena, Düsseldorf	England	2–0	3–1	Friendly
15	13 October 1987	Parkstadion, Gelsenkirchen	Sweden	1–0	2–2	Friendly
16	22 March 1989	Vasil Levski National Stadium, Sofia	Bulgaria	2–1	2–1	Friendly
17	4 October 1989	Westfalenstadion, Dortmund	Finland	2–0	6–1	1990 World Cup qualifier
18	19 June 1990	San Siro, Milan	Colombia	1–0	1–1	1990 World Cup

== Managerial statistics ==
Team	From	To	Record				
Team	From	To	G	W	D	L	Win %
Yokohama FC	2003	2004	88	20	34	34	22.73
Sydney FC	2005	2006	34	21	7	6	61.76
Avispa Fukuoka	2007	2008	72	30	12	30	41.67
Total			194	71	53	70	36.60

== Honours ==
1. FC Köln

- DFB-Pokal: 1982–83
- UEFA Cup runner-up: 1985–86

West Germany U21

- UEFA European Under-21 Championship runner-up: 1982

West Germany

- FIFA World Cup: 1990; runner-up: 1982, 1986

Individual

- UEFA European Under-21 Championship top scorer: 1982
- kicker Bundesliga Team of the Season: 1981–82, 1984–85, 1989–90
- FIFA World Cup top assist provider: 1982
- Goal of the Year (Germany): 1985
- Sydney FC Hall of Fame: 2015

== See also ==
- Litti's Summer Sports, Game Boy video game endorsed by Pierre Littbarski
