= Abdelmajid Bourebbou =

Algerian footballer (born 1951)

Personal information
- Date of birth: 16 March 1951 (age 75)
- Place of birth: Arris, Algeria
- Height: 1.77 m (5 ft 9 1/2 in)
- Position: Striker

Senior career*
Years	Team	Apps	(Gls)
1970–1972	Quevilly		
1972–1978	Rouen		
1978–1983	Laval	91	(16)

International career
1982	Algeria	3	(0)
- * Club domestic league appearances and goals

Abdelmajid Bourebbou (born 16 March 1951) is an Algerian former footballer who played as a forward. He played as a striker for several French clubs as well as the Algeria national football team. He represented Algeria at the 1982 FIFA World Cup in Spain.
