= Uli Stielike =

German footballer and manager

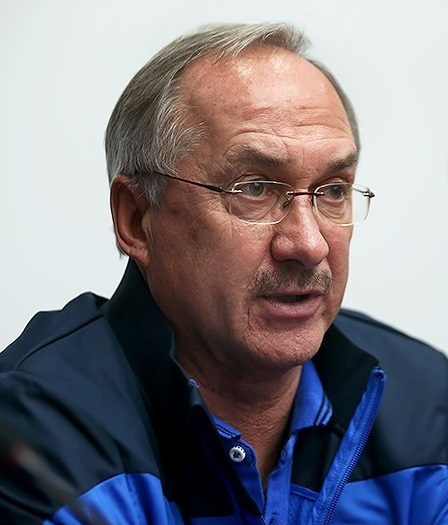
- Stielike in 2014

Personal information
- Full name: Ulrich Stielike
- Date of birth: 15 November 1954 (age 71)
- Place of birth: Ketsch, West Germany
- Height: 1.76 m (5 ft 9 in)
- Positions: Midfielder; sweeper

Youth career
- 1962–1972: SpVgg Ketsch

Senior career*
Years	Team	Apps	(Gls)
1972–1977	Borussia Mönchengladbach	109	(12)
1977–1985	Real Madrid	215	(41)
1985–1988	Neuchâtel Xamax	66	(0)
Total		390	(53)

International career
1972–1973	West Germany Youth	16	(0)
1973–1975	West Germany Amateur	10	(3)
1975–1984	West Germany	42	(3)

Managerial career
- 1989–1991: Switzerland
- 1992–1994: Neuchâtel Xamax
- 1994–1995: Waldhof Mannheim
- 1996: Almería
- 1998–2000: Germany (assistant)
- 2000–2006: Germany (U19 / U20 / U21)
- 2006–2008: Ivory Coast
- 2008: FC Sion
- 2008–2010: Al-Arabi
- 2010–2012: Al-Sailiya
- 2013–2014: Al-Arabi
- 2014–2017: South Korea
- 2017–2020: Tianjin Teda
Medal record
Men's football
Representing West Germany (as player)
UEFA European Championship
Winner	1980
FIFA World Cup
Runner-up	1982
Representing South Korea (as manager)
AFC Asian Cup
Runner-up	2015
- * Club domestic league appearances and goals

Ulrich "Uli" Stielike (born 15 November 1954) is a German former footballer and manager. Usually a central midfielder or sweeper, Stielike was well known for his stamina and footballing intelligence. Stielike is one of a small handful of players (Rainer Bonhof and Manfred Kaltz are others) to have played in all three European club finals (the European Cup, European Cup Winners' Cup and UEFA Cup), the FIFA World Cup Final and the UEFA European Championship Final.

== Playing career ==
=== Club career ===
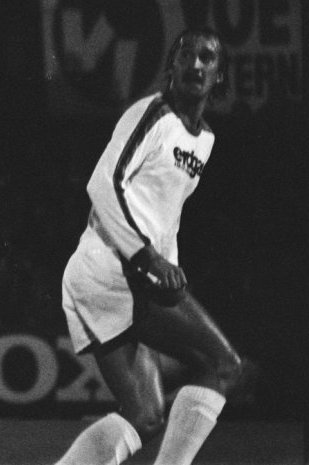
Stielike with Borussia Mönchengladbach in 1976

Stielike was a West Germany youth international for hometown club SpVgg Ketsch when he got signed by UEFA Cup runner-up Borussia Mönchengladbach in 1973, first coming to action as a full back for the then two-times German Bundesliga champion. Playing in defensive midfield for his club, he was part of the Mönchengladbach team that won the Bundesliga titles in 1975, 1976 and 1977 and the UEFA Cup in 1975, and he gained a runner-up medal in the European Cup in 1977 following a 3–1 loss to Liverpool in the final. In five seasons he amassed 109 Bundesliga matches.

Ahead of the 1977–78 season, Stielike moved on to join Real Madrid. His first three seasons at Santiago Bernabéu all ended in Real winning La Liga. In 1980 and 1982, he was part of the side winning Copa del Rey, in 1985 he added the Copa de la Liga, and finished off his Madrid years with the UEFA Cup victory of the same summer.

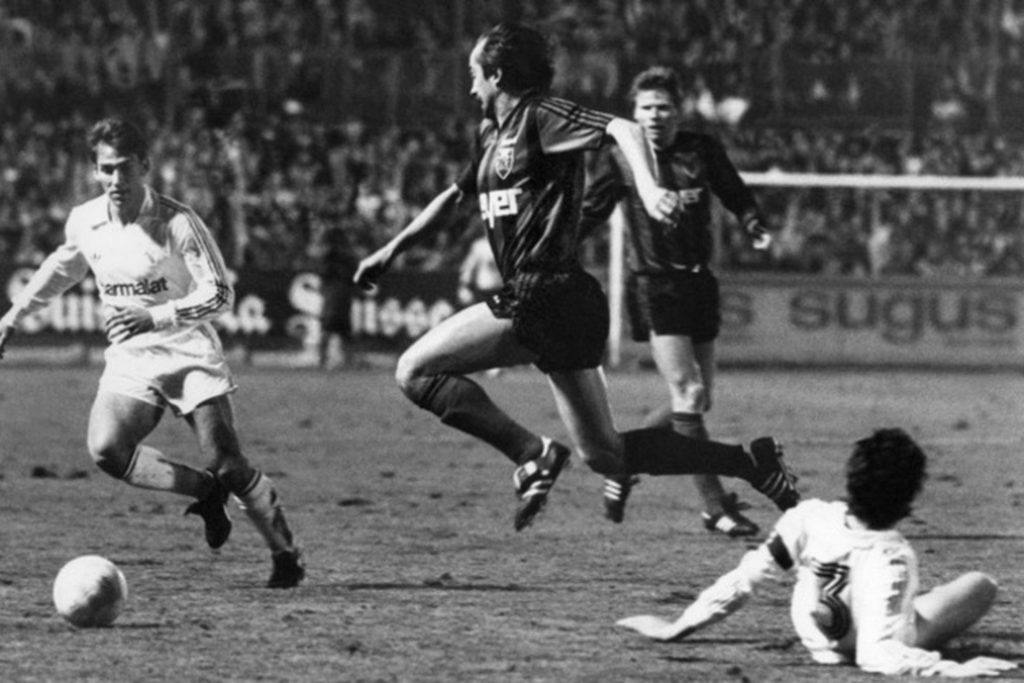
Stielike (foreground) in action for Neuchâtel Xamax against his former club Real Madrid in the second leg of the 1985–86 UEFA Cup quarter-finals, scoring the opening goal in a 2–0 win.

Based on the votes of representatives of Spanish sports paper Don Balón, Stielike was selected 'Best Foreign Player' in La Liga four times in a row between 1978 and 1981.

In 1985, Stielike joined Neuchâtel Xamax and won two Swiss Super League trophies in 1987 and 1988 with the club.

Stielike retired from playing in 1988. He had appeared for Mönchengladbach, Real Madrid and Xamax in 83 matches in the European cup competitions.

=== International career ===
Stielike was capped in 42 internationals with West Germany from 1975 to 1984 with whom he won 1980 UEFA European Football Championship and the runner-up medal at the 1982 FIFA World Cup. Stielike did not feature for his country in the 1978 FIFA World Cup after the German Football Association under Hermann Neuberger had decided to force their national coaches to not select players playing their club football outside the Bundesliga. A central figure for the defence of Real Madrid in the late 1970s and the early 1980s, Stielike could only partially live up to those expectations in his duties for West Germany. Early hopes had been that he could be the ideal successor of legendary sweeper Franz Beckenbauer, with whom he played in a few internationals in the 1970s, but Stielike's playing strengths did not lend itself to that role. Stielike played in the now legendary semi-final match of the 1982 World Cup against France, which ended in a 3–3 draw after extra time. A famous photograph from the resulting shootout showed Stielike being consoled by a young Pierre Littbarski after having just missed a penalty, his head buried in Littbarski's shirt. West Germany eventually won 5–4 on penalties, and then went on to lose 3–1 to Italy in the final. Uli Stielike would be the last German player to miss a penalty in a shootout until Thomas Müller, Mesut Özil and Bastian Schweinsteiger all missed against Italy in the quarterfinals of UEFA Euro 2016, and the only player to miss in the World Cup until Kai Havertz, Nick Woltemade and Jonathan Tah missed against Paraguay in the 2026 FIFA World Cup.

Stielike's final appearance for his country took place against Argentina (3–1 loss) in September 1984 in Beckenbauer's first match in charge of West Germany. Over those years Stielike scored three goals, the last in a 3–2 win over Bulgaria in Varna in February 1984. Shortly afterwards he was named in Jupp Derwall's squad for the 1984 UEFA European Football Championship.

== Style of play ==
Stielike usually played as a central midfielder, although he was also capable of playing as a sweeper. A combative and imposing player, he was well known for his stamina, positioning, commitment, and footballing intelligence, as well as his personality and forcefulness in midfield.

== Managerial career ==
=== Early career ===
After his retirement from his playing career, Stielike was the coach of the Switzerland national football team from 1989 to 1991 as successor of Daniel Jeandupeux and predecessor of Roy Hodgson.

From 1994 to 1996, Stielike also had managerial spells at club level with UD Almería in Spain and SV Waldhof Mannheim in the 2. Bundesliga in Germany.

=== Germany ===
In 1998, Stielike had been interviewed by Egidius Braun, the then chairman of the German Football Association, following a vacancy occurred through the resignation of Berti Vogts from the head coaching job of Germany in 1998. He believed Braun would offer him the succession of Vogts, consequently heading into an interview with kicker (Sports magazine) in this (mistaken) belief. After further talks with Braun had disclosed that Stielke would only be appointed assistant coach rather than head coach, Stielike had to retract some remarks (e.g. concerning Andreas Möller).

From 9 September 1998 to 7 May 2000, Stielike had been the assistant to then Germany coach Erich Ribbeck. Shortly before 2000 UEFA European Championship, which ended in a disaster for the Germans, Stielike stepped down from his role as assistant due to differences in some respects with Ribbeck. He was replaced by Horst Hrubesch for the tournament.

Stielike spent six years working with different youth teams (i.e. the U21 side until 2004) of Germany and manager of Germany national under-20 football team of 2001 FIFA World Youth Championship and 2003 FIFA World Youth Championship.

=== Ivory Coast ===
On 14 September 2006, Stielike penned a contract with to take over the Ivory Coast national team in succession of Frenchman Henri Michel, subsequent to the elimination of the team at the 2006 FIFA World Cup. Stielike stepped down as Les Éléphants coach on 7 January 2008 due to his son's alarming ill health. On 1 February, Michael Stielike, 23, died after failing to receive a lung transplant, with his health gradually deteriorating until he was eventually put on life support.

=== FC Sion ===
On 31 May 2008, he agreed to coach Swiss side FC Sion, but was fired on 3 November 2008. On 5 January 2009 he then signed a contract with Al-Arabi Sports Club.

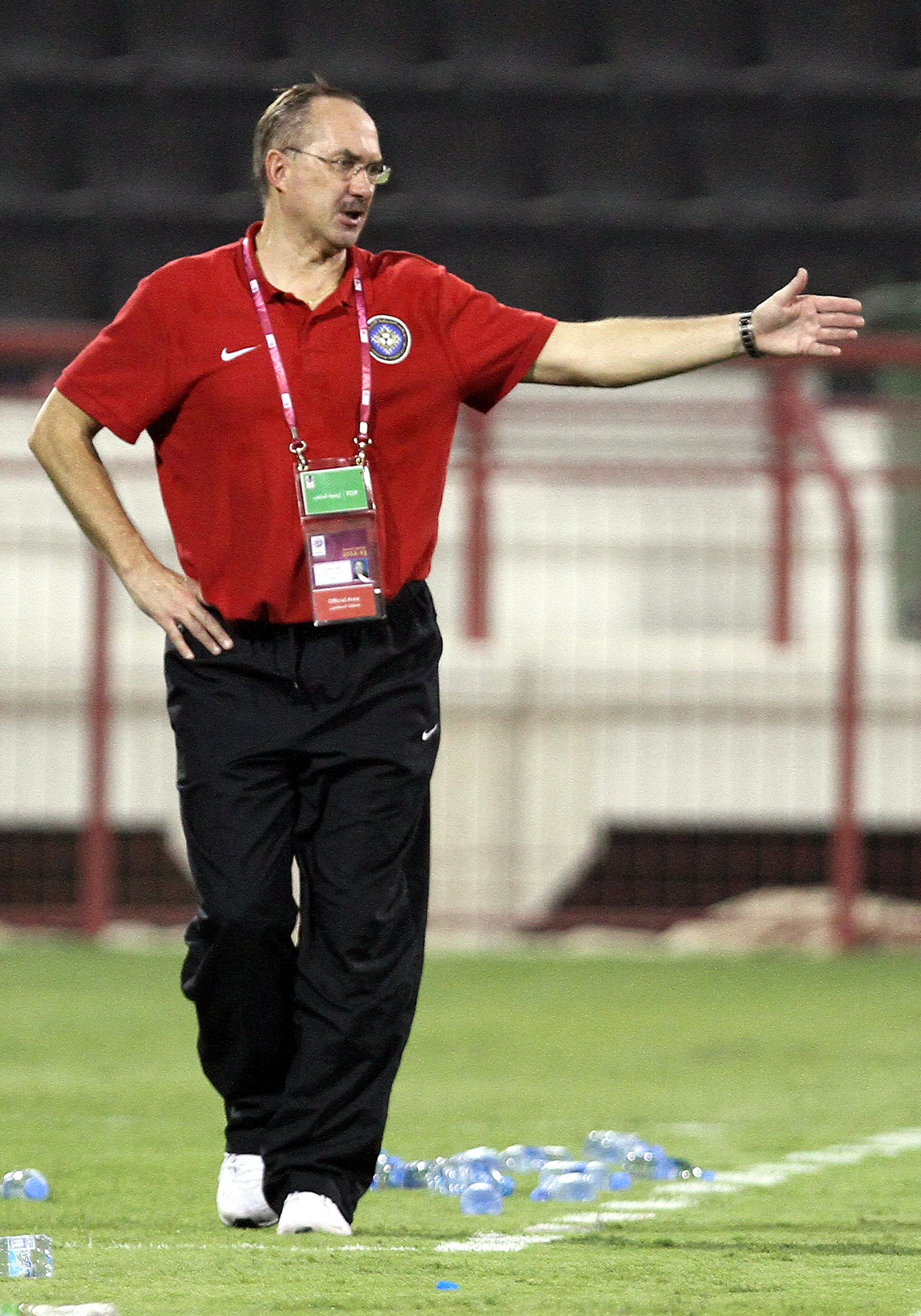
Stielike during his tenure as Al-Sailiya coach in the Qatar Stars League, 2012.

=== South Korea ===
On 5 September 2014, Stielike was named manager of the South Korea national team, signing a four-year contract running through the 2018 World Cup. In his first game in charge, South Korea defeated Paraguay 2–0 in a friendly match. His side began its 2015 AFC Asian Cup campaign with a 1–0 win over Oman, followed by victories with the same scoreline over Kuwait and hosts Australia. South Korea qualified to the knockout stage as group winners with nine points and faced Uzbekistan in the quarter-finals. Though the game remained scoreless for the first 90 minutes, two goals from Son Heung Min in extra time helped South Korea reach the semi-finals against Iraq. Beating Iran, 2–0, in the semifinal, South Korea ultimately finished as runner-up after losing to Australia 2–1 in the final. Despite the loss, the team restored its public image that had been damaged after the 2014 World Cup. The team received praise for having one of the strongest defenses in the tournament, conceding no goals until the final.

Stielike's team got off to a good start in the second round of the 2018 World Cup qualifiers, not conceding a single goal and winning all eight matches in Group G. The third round of Group A matches did not go as well, however, and Stielike face heavy criticism over team selection and tactics after a 1–0 loss to Iran on 11 October 2016 and another 1–0 loss on 23 March 2017 to China (only Korea's second loss to China in 32 matches). A 3–2 loss to Qatar on 13 June 2017 was South Korea's third defeat in its first eight matches in Group A; the setback was South Korea's first to Qatar in 32 years. This horrible run of results led to Stielike's dismissal by the Korea Football Association (KFA) on 15 June 2017. After the loss to Qatar, South Korea remained second in Group A, seven points behind the already qualified Iran but just one point ahead of third-place Uzbekistan, with each team having played eight matches in Group A. South Korea faced Iran and then Uzbekistan in their final two Group A matches. In the end, the Taegeuk Warriors finished second in the group to qualify despite two goalless draws under Shin Tae-yong, Stielike's successor.

==== Controversies ====
After Stielike was sacked from South Korea, South Korean reporters revealed that Stielike had turned command over to one of the coaching staff due to players' dissatisfaction after two group matches in the 2015 AFC Asian Cup. In an interview after the disclosures, Shin Tae-yong, the assistant manager at the time, claimed that South Korea's result in the 2015 Asian Cup was achieved by him, not by Stielike.

Stielike was also criticized on the basis that his co-worker Carlos Armua had an uncertain career and capability.

=== Tianjin Teda ===
On 11 September 2017, Stielike took over Tianjin Teda of the Chinese Super League. He left on 19 August 2020.

== Honours ==
=== As a player ===
Borussia Mönchengladbach

- Bundesliga: 1974–75, 1975–76, 1976–77
- DFB-Pokal: 1972–73
- UEFA Cup: 1974–75
- European Cup runner-up: 1976–77

Real Madrid

- La Liga: 1977–78, 1978–79, 1979–80
- Copa del Rey: 1979–80, 1981–82
- Copa de la Liga: 1985
- UEFA Cup: 1984–85
- European Cup runner-up: 1980–81
- European Cup Winners' Cup runner-up: 1982–83

Neuchâtel Xamax

- Swiss Super League: 1986–87, 1987–88

West Germany

- UEFA European Championship: 1980
- FIFA World Cup runner-up: 1982

Individual

- La Liga Team of The Year: 1978, 1979, 1981, 1982
- La Liga: Don Balón Award for Best Foreign Player: 1979, 1980, 1981, 1982

=== As a manager ===
Al-Sailiya

- Qatargas League: 2011–12

South Korea

- EAFF East Asian Cup: 2015
- AFC Asian Cup runner-up: 2015
