= Mario Osbén =

Chilean footballer (1950–2021)

Personal information
- Full name: Mario Ignacio Osbén Méndez
- Date of birth: 14 July 1950
- Place of birth: Chiguayante, Chile
- Date of death: 7 February 2021 (aged 70)
- Place of death: Concepción, Chile
- Height: 1.77 m (5 ft 10 in)
- Position: Goalkeeper

Senior career*
Years	Team	Apps	(Gls)
1970	Deportes Concepción		
1971	Ñublense		
1972	Deportes Concepción		
1973	Lota Schwager		
1974-1975	Deportes Concepción		
1975-1979	Unión Española		
1980–1985	Colo-Colo		
1986–1992	Cobreloa		
1994	Universidad de Concepción		

International career
1979–1988	Chile	36	(0)

Managerial career
- 1992: Cobreloa (interim)
- 1996–1999: Universidad de Concepción
- * Club domestic league appearances and goals

Mario Ignacio Osbén Méndez (14 July 1950 – 7 February 2021) was a Chilean footballer who played as a goalkeeper. Nicknamed "El Gato" ("The Cat"), he played for Ñublense, Club de Deportes Concepción, Unión Española, Colo Colo and Cobreloa during his professional career. He played for the Chile national team at the 1982 FIFA World Cup, playing all three matches. In total he played 36 matches for his national team between 1979 and 1988, making his debut on 11 July 1979 in a friendly against Uruguay.

== Political career ==
Osbén served as councillor for Chiguayante commune in two stints: 2004–2008 and 2012–2016.

== Death ==
Osbén died on 7 February 2021 aged 70. After suffering a heart attack in Chiguayante, his city of birth, he had been taken to hospital in Concepción where his death was confirmed.
