= Gustavo Moscoso =

Chilean footballer (born 1955)

Personal information
- Full name: Gustavo Segundo Moscoso Huencho
- Date of birth: August 10, 1955 (age 71)
- Place of birth: Oficina salitrera Pedro de Valdivia, Chile
- Height: 1.69 m (5 ft 6 1/2 in)
- Position: Midfielder

Senior career*
Years	Team	Apps	(Gls)
1972–1983	Universidad Católica		
1983–1989	Puebla		
1989–1990	Morelia		
1991–1992	Tigres UANL		

International career
1975	Chile U20		
1976–1982	Chile	21	(4)

Managerial career
- 2000: Puebla
- 2011–2013: Lobos BUAP
- * Club domestic league appearances and goals

Gustavo Segundo Moscoso Huencho (born August 10, 1955) is a former football player from Chile, who played as an attacking midfielder and/or striker.

== Career ==
Born in the saltpeter work ("saltpeter office" in Chile) close to Tocopilla called Pedro de Valdivia, Moscoso represented Chile at under-20 level in the 1975 South American Championship. A player of Universidad Católica, he represented Chile at the 1982 FIFA World Cup, wearing the number eleven jersey.

== Post-retirement ==
Moscoso became a naturalized Mexican citizen in 2006. He was appointed as the manager of Puebla in April 2008. Next, he worked as the head coach of Mexican side Lobos de la BUAP.

After being a manager, Moscos has served as a sport advisor.
