= Georg Schmidt (footballer) =

Austrian football manager

Personal information
- Date of birth: 7 April 1927
- Place of birth: Austria
- Date of death: 6 July 1990 (aged 63)

Managerial career
- Years: Team
- 1982: Austria

Georg Schmidt (7 April 1927 – 6 July 1990) was an Austrian football (soccer) former manager.

Most notably he was co-manager of the Austria national football team in the 1982 FIFA World Cup, with Felix Latzke, and was thus credited with infamy for the Shame of Gijón, a somewhat dubious 0-1 loss to West Germany.
