= Josef Degeorgi =

Austrian footballer

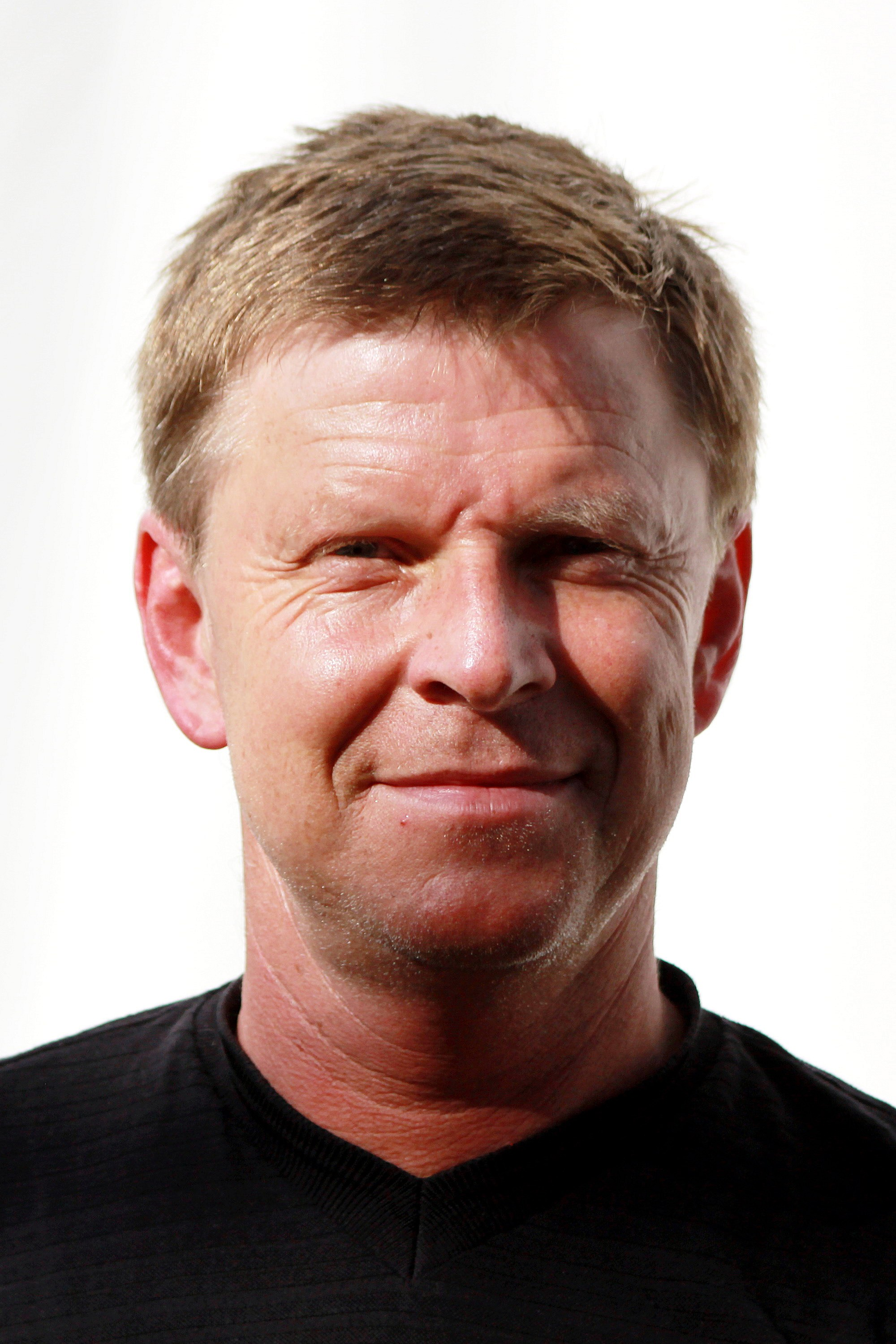

Personal information
- Date of birth: 19 January 1960 (age 66)
- Place of birth: Bad Vöslau, Austria
- Height: 1.80 m (5 ft 11 in)
- Position: Defender

Senior career*
Years	Team	Apps	(Gls)
1977–1982	Admira Wacker	61	(1)
1982–1990	Austria Wien	188	(8)
1990–1991	Admira Wacker	30	(1)
1991–1993	VfB Mödling		

International career
1982–1990	Austria	30	(1)
- * Club domestic league appearances and goals

Josef Degeorgi (born 19 January 1960) is a former international Austrian footballer.

Degeorgi won the Austrian league four times and the Austrian cup three times while playing for Austria Wien from 1983 to 1990.
