= Max Hagmayr =

Austrian footballer (born 1956)

Personal information
- Date of birth: 16 November 1956 (age 69)
- Place of birth: Wels, Austria
- Height: 1.78 m (5 ft 10 in)
- Position: Striker

Senior career*
Years	Team	Apps	(Gls)
1975–1982	VÖEST Linz	181	(60)
1982–1983	Karlsruher SC	31	(6)
1983–1984	Rapid Wien	14	(0)
1984–1988	LASK Linz	60	(25)
Total		286	(91)

International career
1979–1982	Austria	9	(1)
- * Club domestic league appearances and goals

Max Hagmayr (born 16 November 1956) is a retired football striker from Austria.

== Club career ==
During his club career, Hagmayr played for VÖEST Linz, Karlsruher SC, Rapid Wien and LASK Linz.
