= Anton Pichler (footballer) =

Austrian footballer

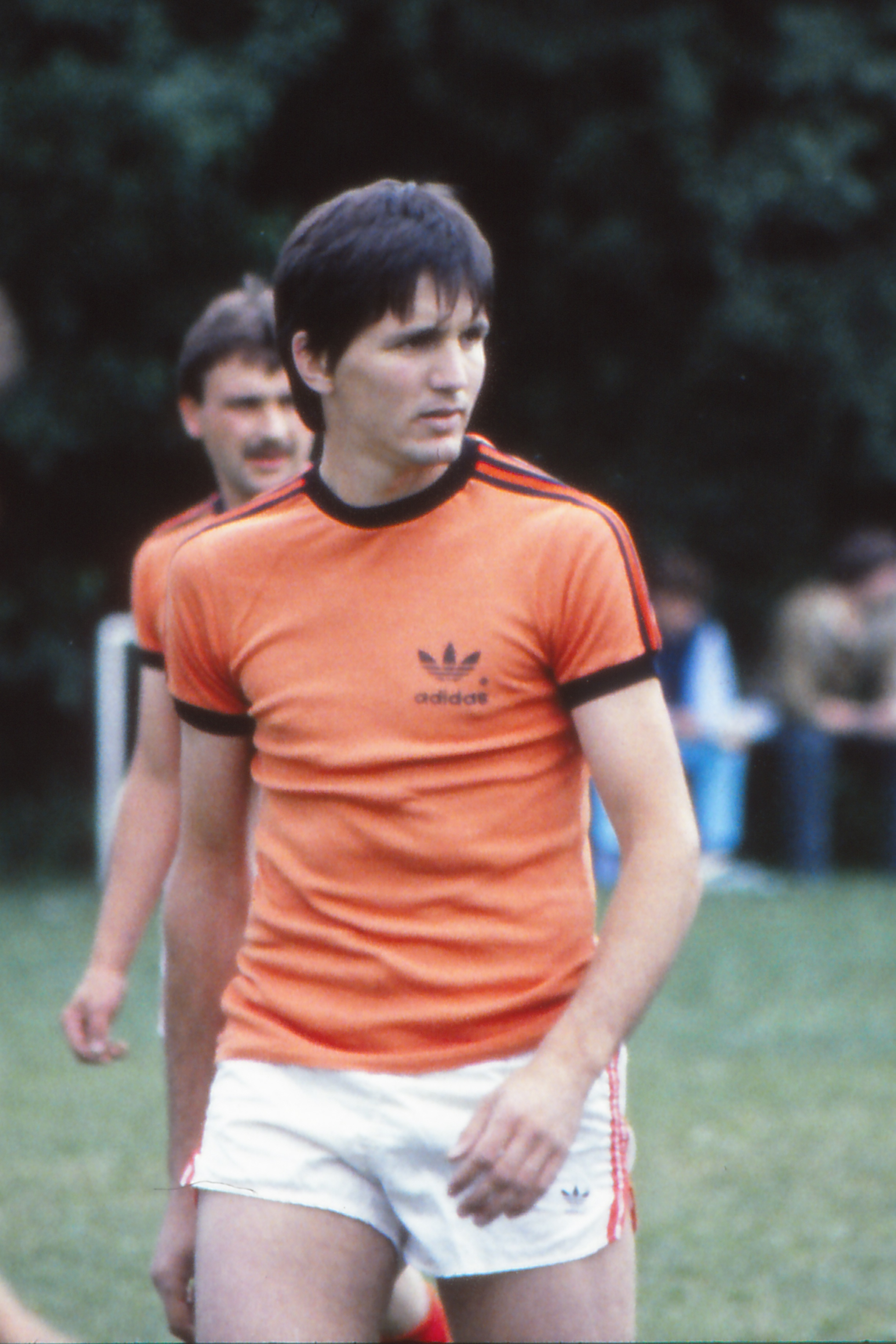
- Pichler in 1986

Personal information
- Full name: Anton Pichler
- Date of birth: 4 October 1955 (age 71)
- Place of birth: Weiz, Austria
- Height: 1.86 m (6 ft 1 in)
- Position: Defender

Senior career*
Years	Team	Apps	(Gls)
1974–1987	Sturm Graz	420	(25)
1987–1988	SKN St. Pölten	4	(0)
Total		424	(25)

International career^{‡}
1976–1985	Austria	11	(0)
- * Club domestic league appearances and goals as of 5 October 2009 ‡ National team caps and goals as of 5 October 2009

Anton Pichler (also called Andy Pichler, born 4 October 1955) is a retired football defender.

During his club career, Pichler played for Sturm Graz for 13 seasons before finishing his career with SKN St. Pölten. He also made 11 appearances for the Austria national team, including the 1982 FIFA World Cup in Spain.
