= Roland Hattenberger =

Austrian footballer

Personal information
- Full name: Roland Hattenberger
- Date of birth: 7 December 1948 (age 77)
- Place of birth: Jenbach, Austria
- Height: 1.83 m (6 ft 0 in)
- Position: Midfielder

Youth career
- 1956–1963: SK Jenbach
- 1963–1968: SK Kufstein

Senior career*
Years	Team	Apps	(Gls)
1968–1971	WSG Wattens		
1971–1974	SSW Innsbruck	78	(15)
1974–1977	SC Fortuna Köln	99	(11)
1977–1981	VfB Stuttgart	99	(9)
1981–1984	SSW Innsbruck	85	(8)
1984–1987	FC Kufstein		

International career
1972–1982	Austria	51	(3)
- * Club domestic league appearances and goals

Roland Hattenberger (born 7 December 1948) is a former Austrian footballer.

== Club career ==
Born in Jenbach, Tyrol, Hattenberger started his professional career at lower league outfit Wattens, before moving to Austrian Football Bundesliga side SSW Innsbruck in 1971. After three seasons there he was lured to the German Bundesliga and stayed there for seven years with SC Fortuna Köln and VfB Stuttgart. He rejoined Innsbruck in 1981 and finished his career with SC Kufstein in 1987.

== International career ==
He made his debut for Austria in a June 1972 World Cup qualification match against Sweden and was a participant at the 1978 and 1982 World Cups. He earned 51 caps, scoring three goals. His last international game was on 28 June 1982 at the World Cup against France.

His son, Matthias Hattenberger plays currently in the Austrian Erste Liga for First Vienna FC 1894.

== Honours ==
SSW Innsbruck

- Austrian Football Bundesliga: 1971–72, 1972–73
- Austrian Cup: 1972–73
