= Friedrich Koncilia =

Austrian footballer

Friedl Koncilia
Personal information
- Full name: Friedrich Koncilia
- Date of birth: 25 February 1948 (age 78)
- Place of birth: Klagenfurt, Austria
- Height: 1.81 m (5 ft 11 in)
- Position: Goalkeeper

Youth career
- 1962–1965: KAC

Senior career*
Years	Team	Apps	(Gls)
1965–1969	Austria Klagenfurt		
1969–1971	SV Wattens	60	(0)
1971–1979	FC Wacker Innsbruck	236	(0)
1979	Anderlecht	8	(0)
1980–1985	Austria Wien	163	(0)
Total		467	(0)

International career
1970–1985	Austria	84	(0)

Managerial career
- 1998: Gamba Osaka
- * Club domestic league appearances and goals

Friedrich Koncilia (born 25 February 1948) is an Austrian former professional football who played as a goalkeeper.

== Club career ==
Born in Klagenfurt, Koncilia made his debut for local side Austria Klagenfurt at 17, moving to SV Wattens in 1969. After two seasons there he enjoyed his longest and most successful spell at FC Wacker Innsbruck, staying there for eight years (teammates included his younger brother Peter, a midfielder). He moved abroad to R.S.C. Anderlecht of Belgium, only to return to Austria after a mere eight games and finished his career at Austria Wien. A back injury forced him to retire at 37.

== International career ==
He made his debut for Austria in a September 1970 friendly match against Hungary and was a participant at the 1978 FIFA World Cup and at the 1982 FIFA World Cup. He earned 84 caps which makes him Austria's fifth most capped player of all-time (with Bruno Pezzey) His last international was a May 1985 World Cup qualification match against Cyprus.

== Managerial statistics ==
Team	From	To	Record				
Team	From	To	G	W	D	L	Win %
Gamba Osaka	1998	1998	12	4	0	8	33.33
Total			12	4	0	8	33.33

== Honours ==
FC Wacker Innsbruck

- Austrian Bundesliga: 1972, 1973, 1975, 1977
- Austrian Cup: 1973, 1975, 1978
- Mitropa Cup: 1975, 1976

Austria Wien

- Austrian Bundesliga: 1980, 1981, 1984, 1985
- Austrian Cup: 1980, 1982, 1984
