= Klaus Lindenberger =

Austrian footballer (born 1957)

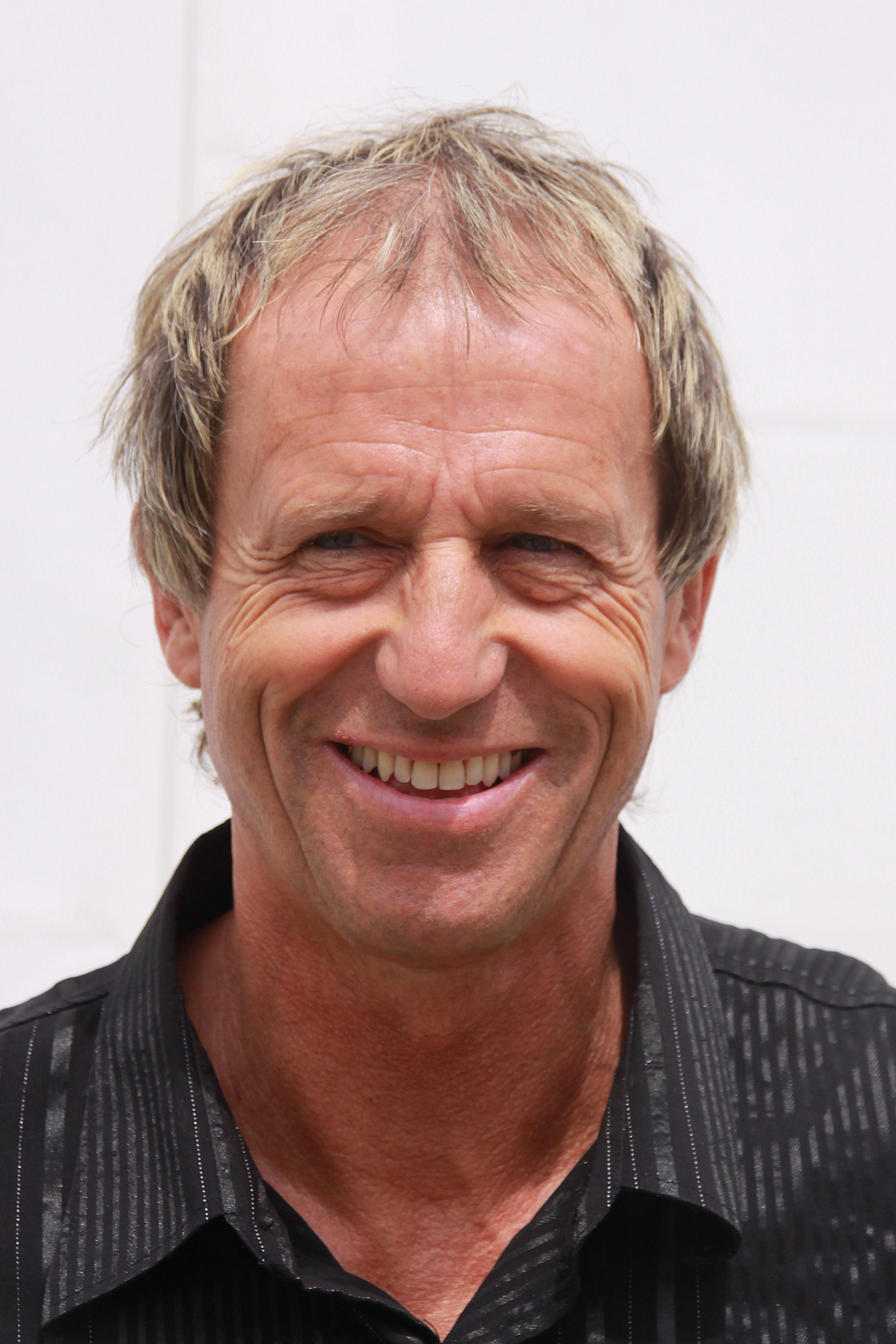

Personal information
- Date of birth: 28 May 1957 (age 69)
- Place of birth: Linz, Austria
- Height: 1.91 m (6 ft 3 in)
- Position: Goalkeeper

Youth career
- 1967–1976: SV Bad-Hall

Senior career*
Years	Team	Apps	(Gls)
1976–1988	LASK	283	(0)
1988–1991	FC Swarovski Tirol	89	(0)
1991–1993	FC Stahl Linz	58	(0)
Total		430	(0)

International career
1982–1990	Austria	43	(0)

Managerial career
- 2008–2009: LASK
- * Club domestic league appearances and goals

Klaus Lindenberger (born 28 May 1957) is an Austrian former football player and coach. A goalkeeper, he played for LASK, FC Swarovski Tirol and FC Stahl Linz. As a coach he managed Austrian Bundesliga side LASK.

== Club career ==
Lindenberger was born in Linz, Austria. made his professional debut with LASK in the 1976–77 season and stayed with his hometown club for over ten years before moving to and winning silverware with FC Swarovski Tirol. After three years he returned to Linz to play for Stahl Linz. He finished his career with minor league side Eintracht Wels.

== International career ==
Lindenberger made his debut for Austria in an April 1982 friendly match against Czechoslovakia and was a participant at the 1982 and 1990 FIFA World Cups. He earned 43 caps, no goals scored. His last international was an August 1990 friendly match against Switzerland.

== Coaching career ==
LASK replaced Lindenberger by Hans Krankl as manager on 24 March 2009. Lindenberger remained at the club in the position of executive manager.

== Honours ==
Swarovski Tirol

- Austrian Football Bundesliga: 1989, 1990
- Austrian Cup: 1989
