= Jupp Derwall =

German football player and manager (1927–2007)

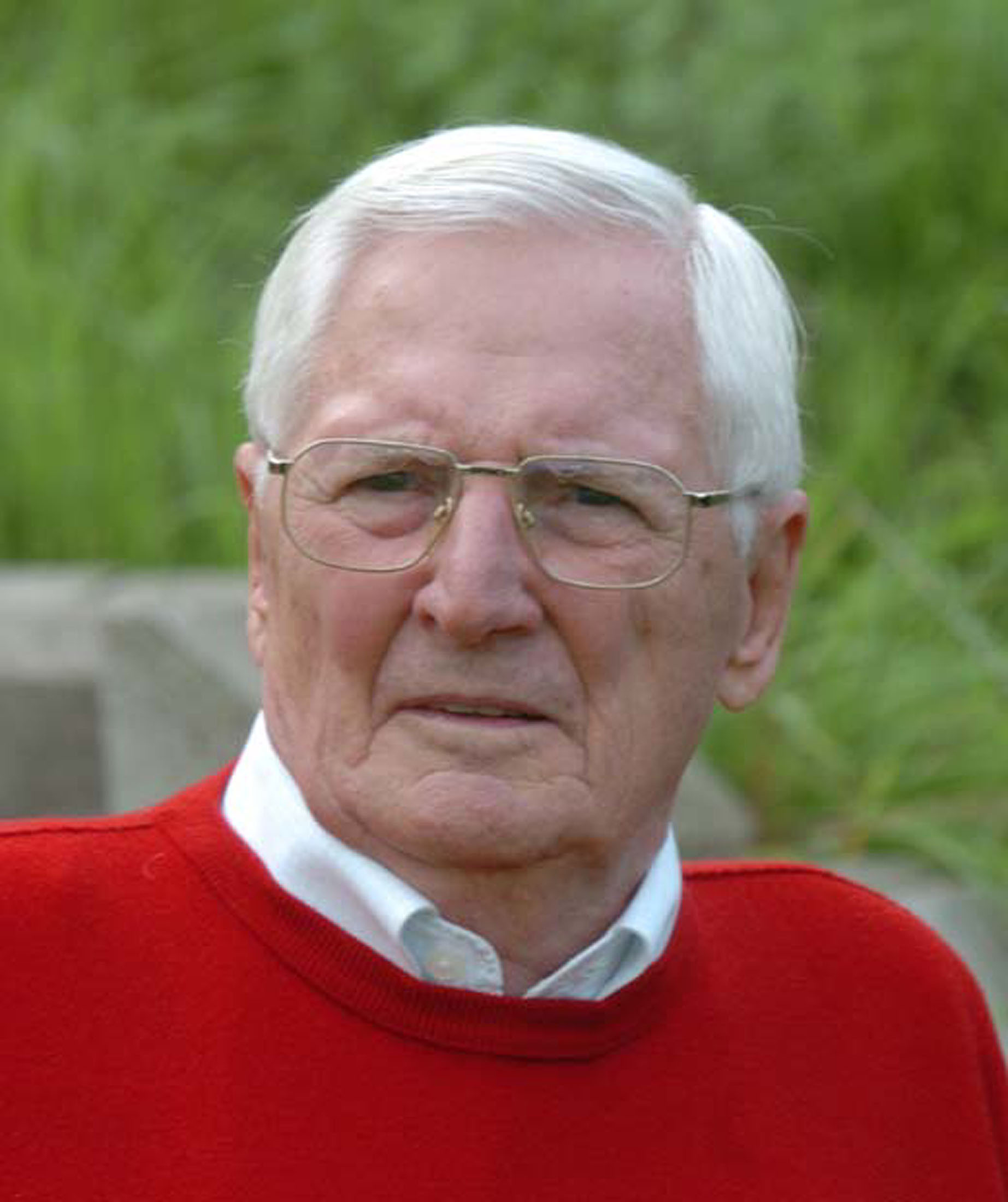
- Derwall in 2007, a few months before his death

Personal information
- Full name: Josef Derwall
- Date of birth: 10 March 1927
- Place of birth: Würselen, Weimar Republic
- Date of death: 26 June 2007 (aged 80)
- Place of death: Sankt Ingbert, Germany
- Position: Forward

Youth career
- 1938–1943: Rhenania Würselen

Senior career*
Years	Team	Apps	(Gls)
1943–1945	Rhenania Würselen		
1945–1946	BV Cloppenburg		
1946–1949	Rhenania Würselen		
1949–1953	Alemannia Aachen	109	(41)
1953–1959	Fortuna Düsseldorf	110	(47)
1959–1961	Biel-Bienne	40	(26)
1961–1962	Schaffhausen	24	(8)

International career
1954	West Germany	2	(0)

Managerial career
- 1959–1961: Biel-Bienne
- 1961–1962: Schaffhausen
- 1962–1963: Fortuna Düsseldorf
- 1965: 1. FC Saarbrücken
- 1970–1978: West Germany (assistant manager)
- 1978–1984: West Germany
- 1984–1987: Galatasaray
Medal record
Men's football
Representing West Germany (as manager)
UEFA European Championship
Winner	1980
FIFA World Cup
Runner-up	1982
- * Club domestic league appearances and goals

Josef "Jupp" Derwall (10 March 1927 – 26 June 2007) was a German professional football manager and player. He was head coach of the West Germany national team between 1978 and 1984, winning UEFA Euro 1980 and reaching the final of the 1982 FIFA World Cup.

Derwall's hairdo provided the basis for his nickname "Chieftain Silver Curl" (Häuptling Silberlocke).

== Playing career ==
Derwall started in 1938 with Rhenania Würselen. Later, he played for Alemannia Aachen and Fortuna Düsseldorf in the western division of the five-way split first German league called Oberliga. With Aachen, Derwall reached the DFB-Pokal final in 1953 where he scored one goal at the 1–2 defeat at the hands of Rot-Weiss Essen. Five years later he reached the cup final with Düsseldorf, which was lost 3–4 against VfB Stuttgart. In 1954, after the Herberger team won the FIFA World Cup, Derwall was also called twice to play for West Germany

== Managerial career ==
=== Early career ===
Not yet retired, Derwall took up player-managing first in Switzerland with Biel-Bienne (1959–1961) and Schaffhausen (1961–1962). After completely retiring from playing, he became the new manager of Fortuna Düsseldorf. Derwall reached the cup final with Fortuna in 1962, losing to 1. FC Nürnberg 1–2 after extra time. Afterwards he became manager of the regional association of Saarland for six years. In 1965, he was also manager of 1. FC Saarbrücken, winning the 1964–65 Regionalliga Südwest and promoting Saarbrücken to the Bundesliga.

=== West Germany ===
In 1970, Derwall was appointed as successor to Udo Lattek as the West German national team's assistant coach under the legendary Helmut Schön. At the 1972 Summer Olympics, he was responsible for the West German team, taking it into the last eight.

Derwall served as Schön's assistant until after the 1978 FIFA World Cup. When Schön retired from managing, also in light of the achievements in the tournament, Derwall was chosen to take his place as head coach of West Germany. His major rivals for this appointment were his coaching staff colleague Erich Ribbeck and Helmut Benthaus, then manager with the reigning German champions VfB Stuttgart, who received no release from his contract.

Derwall's first major tournament as West Germany head coach was UEFA Euro 1980 in Italy, and under his guidance West Germany won the championship in impressive fashion, winning four out of their five games and finishing with the tournament's top scorer in Klaus Allofs. Confidence was high going into the 1982 FIFA World Cup in Spain. Derwall was heard to have said before the first match against Algeria, "If we don't beat Algeria I'll take the next train home!" As things turned out he didn't stick to his promise. After a shock 1–2 defeat by Algeria in the first match, Derwall's West Germany regained their composure and progressed all the way to the final after some tough matches, including the infamous 1–0 win over Austria ("The Shame of Gijón") and the more memorable semi-final against France, where the Germans came back from 1–3 down to tie 3–3 and win on penalties. In the final itself, Germany lost 3–1 to Italy. The stars of this side were Karl-Heinz Rummenigge and Paul Breitner.

Notwithstanding this setback, Derwall remained a highly regarded manager and West Germany were still counted among the favourites for UEFA Euro 1984, but their performance in France was not impressive and Derwall's team were eliminated in the first round. Public opinion in West Germany turned against Derwall rapidly. It reached an absolute low point when people would begin to yell angrily at Derwall had they spotted him in public. He in the end, of what amounted to a public campaign, was forced to resign his position, being replaced by the hitherto-untested Franz Beckenbauer who acted as team manager.

=== Galatasaray ===
Derwall then shocked observers by turning down several job offers in the Bundesliga in favour of accepting the manager's position at Turkish club Galatasaray. At the time, Turkish football was not well regarded in Europe, and Turkish clubs had never made any real impression on the international scene. The arrival of Derwall, an internationally respected and experienced manager, changed this perception, and his tenure at Galatasaray is often credited with having helped spark the revival in the fortunes of Turkish football. As well as winning one national championship and one Turkish Cup, Derwall's time in Istanbul also involved his introducing modern Western European training techniques and tactical ideas to the Turkish game. Therefore, he's regarded as the revolutionizer of Turkish football. Two of Turkey's most respected managers, Fatih Terim and Mustafa Denizli, both trained under Derwall during his time in Turkey, have been quick to praise Derwall's influence.

Derwall retired from managing with Galatasaray in 1987 after helping his club become league champions (for the first time since 1973); despite speculation that he might take over as head coach of the Turkey national team, he chose instead to return to Germany and enjoy his retirement, with the managerial position of the Turkey national team later went to Sepp Piontek, also a German and one of Derwall's students. He was happy to see that the spark he lit grew enormously, with Galatasaray reaching the semi-finals of the 1988–89 European Cup (predecessor of the UEFA Champions League) and winning both the UEFA Cup and UEFA Super Cup in 2000.

His work in Turkey was also considered a major contribution to German-Turkish relations and was honoured with an honorary doctorate of the University of Hacettepe in Ankara and the German Cross of Merit 1st Class (Bundesverdienstkreuz).

== Health problems and death ==
Derwall died after a heart attack in Sankt Ingbert on 26 June 2007. He already had suffered a heart attack in 1991.

His former club Galatasaray gave his name to their training ground after his death.

== Managerial statistics ==
Managerial record by team and tenure
Team	Nat	From	To	Record							
Team	Nat	From	To	G	W	D	L	GF	GA	GD	Win %
West Germany	(Germany)	11 October 1978	20 June 1984	67	44	12	11	144	60	+84	65.67
Galatasaray	(Turkey)	19 July 1984	30 June 1987	148	70	55	23	206	117	+89	47.30
Total				215	114	67	34	350	177	+173	53.02

== Honours ==
=== Manager ===
1. FC Saarbrücken

- Regionalliga Südwest: 1964–65

Galatasaray

- Süper Lig: 1986–87
- Turkish Cup: 1984–85
- Turkish Super Cup: 1987

West Germany

- UEFA European Championship: 1980
- FIFA World Cup runner-up: 1982
