= Football at the 1988 Summer Olympics – Group D =

== Table ==
Pos	Team	Pld	W	D	L	GF	GA	GD	Pts	Brazil national football team	Australia men's national soccer team	Yugoslavia national football team	Nigeria national football team
1	Brazil	3	3	0	0	9	1	+8	6		3–0	2–1	4–0
2	Australia	3	2	0	1	2	3	−1	4	0–3		1–0	1–0
3	Yugoslavia	3	1	0	2	4	4	0	2	1–2	0–1		3–1
4	Nigeria	3	0	0	3	1	8	−7	0	0–4	0–1	1–3	

Source: FIFA
Legend: Blue = home team win; Yellow = draw; Red = away team win.

== Matches ==
=== Australia vs Yugoslavia ===
Australia	1 — 0 (final score after 90 minutes)	(Socialist Federal Republic of Yugoslavia) Yugoslavia
Manager: (Australia) Frank Arok Team: 01 - GK - Jeffrey Olver (yellow card) 73'; 03 - DF - Graham Jennings; 04 - DF - Charlie Yankos (yellow card) 75'; 05 - DF - Robbie Dunn (yellow card) 34'; 06 - MF - Paul Wade; 08 - MF - Mike Petersen; 11 - MF - Oscar Crino; 12 - MF - Alan Davidson; 07 - FW - Frank Farina; 09 - FW - Graham Arnold (yellow card) 20'; 18 - FW - David Mitchell Substitutes: none Unused Substitutes: 20 - GK - Michael Gibson ? ? ? ? Scorers: 1-0 Frank Farina (48')	Half-time: 0-0 Competition: Olympic tournament (group stage) Date: Sunday; September 18, 1988 Kick off: 5 p.m. Venue: Gwangju Mudeung Stadium, Gwangju Attendance: 12000 Referee: Juan Carlos Loustau ARG Assistants: Keith Hackett GBR; Shizuo Takada JPN Match rules: 90 minutes Five named substitutes Maximum of 2 substitutions	Manager: (Socialist Federal Republic of Yugoslavia) Ivica Osim Team: 01 - GK - Dragoje Leković sub 30'; 02 - DF - Vujadin Stanojković; 03 - DF - Predrag Spasić; 04 - DF - Srečko Katanec; 06 - MF - Dragoljub Brnović; 07 - MF - Refik Šabanadžović; 09 - MF - Ivica Barbarić; 10 - MF - Dragan Stojković; 13 - FW - Duško Milinković sub 69'; 15 - FW - Semir Tuce; 16 - FW - Vladislav Đukić (yellow card) 34' Substitutes: 12 - GK - Stevan Stojanović on 30'; 17 - FW - Mirko Mihić on 69' Unused Substitutes: ? ? ? Scorers: -

=== Brazil vs Nigeria ===
Brazil	4 — 0 (final score after 90 minutes)	Nigeria
Manager: (Brazil) Carlos Alberto Silva Team: 01 - GK - Cláudio Taffarel; 02 - DF - Jorginho; 05 - DF - Ademir; 13 - DF - André Cruz; 14 - DF - Luiz Carlos Winck; 15 - DF - Aloísio; 08 - MF - Geovani; 16 - MF - Milton; 09 - FW - Edmar sub 63'; 10 - FW - Careca sub 73'; 11 - FW - Romário Substitutes: 17 - MF - Neto on 63'; 20 - FW - Bebeto on 73' Unused Substitutes: 12 - GK - Zé Carlos ? ? Scorers: 1-0 Edmar (59'); 2-0 Romário (74'); 3-0 Romário (84'); 4-0 Bebeto (86')	Half-time: 0-0 Competition: Olympic tournament (group stage) Date: Sunday; September 18, 1988 Kick off: 7 p.m. Venue: Daejeon Hanbat Stadium, Daejeon Attendance: 29512 Referee: Vincent Mauro USA Assistants: Alexey Spirin URS; Jesús Díaz COL Match rules: 90 minutes Five named substitutes Maximum of 2 substitutions	Manager: (West Germany) Manfred Höner Team: 01 - GK - David Ngodigha; 02 - DF - Emeka Ezeugo sub 67'; 03 - DF - Andrew Uwe (yellow card) 7'; 04 - DF - Ademola Adeshina; 05 - DF - Chidi Nwanu; 06 - DF - Dahiru Sadi; 07 - DF - Augustine Eguavoen; 08 - MF - Sylvanus Okpala (yellow card) 37'; 10 - MF - Samuel Okwaraji; 09 - FW - Dominic Iorfa sub 60'; 11 - FW - Rashidi Yekini Substitutes: 16 - FW - Samson Siasia on 60'; 14 - ? - Osaro Obobaifo on 67' Unused Substitutes: 12 - GK - Christian Obi ? ? Scorers: -

=== Yugoslavia vs Nigeria ===
(Socialist Federal Republic of Yugoslavia) Yugoslavia	3 — 1 (final score after 90 minutes)	Nigeria
Manager: (Socialist Federal Republic of Yugoslavia) Ivica Osim Team: 12 - GK - Stevan Stojanović; 02 - DF - Vujadin Stanojković; 03 - DF - Predrag Spasić; 04 - DF - Srečko Katanec (yellow card) 36'; 05 - DF - Davor Jozić; 07 - MF - Refik Šabanadžović sub 69'; 09 - MF - Ivica Barbarić; 10 - MF - Dragan Stojković; 08 - MF - Toni Savevski; 14 - FW - Davor Šuker sub 69'; 17 - FW - Mirko Mihić (yellow card) 34' Substitutes: 06 - MF - Dragoljub Brnović on 69'; 11 - MF - Cvijan Milošević on 69' Unused Substitutes: ? ? ? Scorers: 1-0 Dragan Stojković (35'); 2-0 Refik Šabanadžović (49'); 3-0 Dragan Stojković (67')	Half-time: 1-0 Competition: Olympic tournament (group stage) Date: Tuesday; September 20, 1988 Kick off: 5 p.m. Venue: Daejeon Hanbat Stadium, Daejeon Attendance: 24000 Referee: Choi Gil-Soo KOR Assistants: Jesús Díaz COL; Vincent Mauro USA Match rules: 90 minutes Five named substitutes Maximum of 2 substitutions	Manager: (West Germany) Manfred Höner Team: 12 - GK - Christian Obi; 13 - DF - Bright Omokaro sub 46'; 03 - DF - Andrew Uwe (yellow card) 7'; 04 - DF - Ademola Adeshina (yellow card) 46'; 05 - DF - Chidi Nwanu; 06 - DF - Dahiru Sadi; 07 - DF - Augustine Eguavoen; 08 - MF - Sylvanus Okpala; 10 - MF - Samuel Okwaraji sub 79'; 16 - FW - Samson Siasia; 11 - FW - Rashidi Yekini Substitutes: 15 - MF - Mike Obiku on 46'; 17 - FW - Wole Odegbami on 79' Unused Substitutes: 01 - GK - David Ngodigha ? ? Scorers: 3-1 Rashidi Yekini (88')

=== Australia vs Brazil ===
Australia	0 — 3 (final score after 90 minutes)	Brazil
Manager: (Australia) Frank Arok Team: 01 - GK - Jeffrey Olver; 03 - DF - Graham Jennings; 04 - DF - Charlie Yankos; 05 - DF - Robert Dunn sub 60'; 06 - MF - Paul Wade; 08 - MF - Mike Petersen; 11 - MF - Oscar Crino; 12 - MF - Alan Davidson; 07 - FW - Frank Farina sub 75' (yellow card) 14'; 09 - FW - Graham Arnold; 18 - FW - David Mitchell Substitutes: 02 - DF - Gary van Egmond on 60'; 17 - MF - Robbie Slater on 75' Unused Substitutes: 20 - GK - Michael Gibson ? ? Scorers: -	Half-time: 0-1 Competition: Olympic tournament (group stage) Date: Tuesday; September 20, 1988 Kick off: 7 p.m. Venue: Dongdaemun Stadium, Seoul Attendance: 15000 Referee: Karl-Heinz Tritschler FRG Assistants: Hernán Silva CHI; Michał Listkiewicz POL Match rules: 90 minutes Five named substitutes Maximum of 2 substitutions	Manager: (Brazil) Carlos Alberto Silva Team: 01 - GK - Cláudio Taffarel; 03 - DF - Batista (yellow card) 44'; 05 - DF - Ademir (yellow card) 44'; 13 - DF - André Cruz; 14 - DF - Luiz Carlos Winck; 15 - DF - Aloísio; 08 - MF - Geovani; 16 - MF - Milton sub 81'; 09 - FW - Edmar; 10 - FW - Careca sub 75'; 11 - FW - Romário Substitutes: 20 - FW - Bebeto on 75'; 18 - FW - João Paulo on 81' Unused Substitutes: 12 - GK - Zé Carlos ? ? Scorers: 0-1 Romário (20'); 0-2 Romário (57'); 0-3 Romário (61')

=== Yugoslavia vs Brazil ===
(Socialist Federal Republic of Yugoslavia) Yugoslavia	1 — 2 (final score after 90 minutes)	Brazil
Manager: (Socialist Federal Republic of Yugoslavia) Ivica Osim Team: 12 - GK - Stevan Stojanović; 02 - DF - Vujadin Stanojković; 03 - DF - Predrag Spasić; 04 - DF - Srečko Katanec; 05 - DF - Davor Jozić (yellow card) 24'; 07 - MF - Refik Šabanadžović; 09 - MF - Ivica Barbarić; 10 - MF - Dragan Stojković; 06 - MF - Dragoljub Brnović sub 46'; 15 - FW - Semir Tuce; 17 - FW - Mirko Mihić sub 60' Substitutes: 11 - MF - Cvijan Milošević on 46'; 14 - FW - Davor Šuker on 60' Unused Substitutes: ? ? ? Scorers: 1-2 Refik Šabanadžović (69')	Half-time: 0-1 Competition: Olympic tournament (group stage) Date: Thursday; September 22, 1988 Kick off: 7 p.m. Venue: Daejeon Hanbat Stadium, Daejeon Attendance: 31200 Referee: Alexey Spirin URS Assistants: Jean-Fidele Diramba GAB; Choi Gil-Soo KOR Match rules: 90 minutes Five named substitutes Maximum of 2 substitutions	Manager: (Brazil) Carlos Alberto Silva Team: 01 - GK - Cláudio Taffarel; 03 - DF - Batista; 05 - DF - Ademir; 13 - DF - André Cruz; 14 - DF - Luiz Carlos Winck; 15 - DF - Aloísio; 08 - MF - Geovani; 16 - MF - Milton; 09 - FW - Edmar sub 46'; 10 - FW - Careca sub 46'; 11 - FW - Romário Substitutes: 19 - MF - Andrade on 46'; 20 - FW - Bebeto on 46' Unused Substitutes: 12 - GK - Zé Carlos ? ? Scorers: 0-1 André Cruz (25'); 0-2 Bebeto (56')

=== Australia vs Nigeria ===
Australia	1 — 0 (final score after 90 minutes)	Nigeria
Manager: (Australia) Frank Arok Team: 01 - GK - Jeffrey Olver; 02 - DF - Gary van Egmond; 03 - DF - Graham Jennings; 04 - DF - Charlie Yankos; 05 - DF - Robert Dunn sub 69'; 06 - MF - Paul Wade; 11 - MF - Oscar Crino; 12 - MF - Alan Davidson; 09 - FW - Graham Arnold; 10 - FW - John Kosmina sub 84'; 18 - FW - David Mitchell Substitutes: 15 - MF - Andrew Koczka on 69'; 19 - FW - Scott Ollerenshaw on 84' Unused Substitutes: 20 - GK - Michael Gibson ? ? Scorers: 1-0 John Kosmina (75')	Half-time: 0-1 Competition: Olympic tournament (group stage) Date: Tuesday; September 22, 1988 Kick off: 7 p.m. Venue: Dongdaemun Stadium, Seoul Attendance: 12800 Referee: Michał Listkiewicz POL Assistants: Park Hee-Cha-Rang KOR; Yoo Kun-Ho KOR Match rules: 90 minutes Five named substitutes Maximum of 2 substitutions	Manager: (West Germany) Manfred Höner Team: 12 - GK - Christian Obi; 03 - DF - Andrew Uwe (yellow card) 7'; 04 - DF - Ademola Adeshina; 06 - DF - Dahiru Sadi; 07 - DF - Augustine Eguavoen; 08 - MF - Sylvanus Okpala; 09 - MF - Dominic Iorfa sub 52'; 10 - MF - Samuel Okwaraji; 15 - MF - Mike Obiku sub 80' (yellow card) 51'; 11 - FW - Rashidi Yekini; 16 - FW - Samson Siasia Substitutes: 17 - FW - Wole Odegbami on 52'; 02 - DF - Emeka Ezeugo on 80' Unused Substitutes: 01 - GK - David Ngodigha ? ? Scorers: -
