= 1982 FIFA World Cup qualification (CAF) =

Tournament statistics
- Top scorer: (Cameroon) Roger Milla (6 goals)

Listed below are the dates and results for the 1982 FIFA World Cup qualification rounds for the African zone (CAF). For an overview of the qualification rounds, see the article 1982 FIFA World Cup qualification.

A total of 29 CAF teams entered the competition. However, Central African Republic was excluded by FIFA for not paying the entry fee. The African Zone was allocated 2 places (out of 24) in the final tournament. Finally 26 nations played at least one of the 46 games.

== Format ==
There would be four rounds of play:

- First Round: 4 teams, Sudan, Liberia, Togo, and Zimbabwe, received byes and advanced to the Second Round directly. The remaining 24 teams were paired up to play knockout matches on a home-and-away basis. The winners would advance to the Second Round. Ghana and Uganda withdrew before playing.
- Second Round and Third Round: In each of these rounds, the teams were paired up to play knockout matches on a home-and-away basis. The winners would advance to the next round. Libya withdrew before playing the Second round.
- Final Round: The 4 teams were paired up to play knockout matches on a home-and-away basis. The winners would qualify.

== First round ==
Team 1	Agg.	Team 2	1st leg	2nd leg
Senegal	0–1	Morocco	0–1	0–0
Zaire	7–3	Mozambique	5–2	2–1
Cameroon	4–1	Malawi	3–0	1–1
Guinea	4–2	Lesotho	3–1	1–1
Tunisia	2–2 (3–4 p)	Nigeria	2–0	0–2
Libya	2–1	Gambia	2–1	0–0
Ethiopia	0–4	Zambia	0–0	0–4
Niger	1–1 (a)	Somalia	0–0	1–1
Sierra Leone	3–5	Algeria	2–2	1–3
Kenya	3–6	Tanzania	3–1	0–5
Egypt	w/o	Ghana	—	—
Madagascar	w/o	Uganda	—	—
Liberia	Bye			
Sudan	Bye			
Togo	Bye			
Zimbabwe	Bye			

22 June 1980

Senegal	0–1	Morocco
		Timoumi 21'

Stade de l'Amitié, Dakar, Senegal
Attendance: 7,872
Referee: Aissaoui Boudabbous (Tunisia)
6 July 1980

Morocco	0–0	Senegal

Stade d'Honneur, Casablanca, Morocco
Attendance: 15,032
Referee: Koudou Poll (Ivory Coast)

Morocco won 1–0 on agg. and advanced to the Second Round.

13 July 1980

Zaire	5–2	Mozambique
Kiyika 30' (pen.), 82' (pen.); Muteba 67', 87'; Ilunga 85'		Guiamba 23', 50'

Stade du 20 Mai, Kinshasa, Zaire
Attendance: 34,871
Referee: Stanislas Kamden (Cameroon)
27 July 1980

Mozambique	1–2	Zaire
Rui Marcos 55' (pen.)		Muteba 15'; Mayélé 17'

Estádio da Machava, Maputo, Mozambique
Attendance: 50,000
Referee: Raymond Ralibenja (Madagascar)

Zaire won 7–3 on agg. and advanced to the Second Round.

29 June 1980

Cameroon	3–0	Malawi
Milla 35'; Kundé 54'; Abega 59'

Ahmadou Ahidjo Stadium, Yaoundé, Cameroon
Attendance: 41,970
Referee: Festus Okubule (Nigeria)
20 July 1980

Malawi	1–1	Cameroon
Dandize 71'		Onguéné 70'

Kamuzu Stadium, Blantyre, Malawi
Attendance: 30,000
Referee: Nicholous Hoohlo (Lesotho)

Cameroon won 4–1 on agg. and advanced to the Second Round.

22 June 1980

Guinea	3–1	Lesotho
Koné 39'; Camara 52' (pen.); Touré 82'		Leboela 44'

Stade du 28 Septembre, Conakry, Guinea
Attendance: 16,000
Referee: Doudou N'Jie (Gambia)
6 July 1980

Lesotho	1–1	Guinea
Masia 65'		Touré 33'

Setsoto Stadium, Maseru, Lesotho
Attendance: 4,325
Referee: Zuberi Bundallah (Tanzania)

Guinea won 4–2 on agg. and advanced to the Second Round.

29 June 1980

Tunisia	2–0	Nigeria
Limam 31'; Lahzami 52'

Stade El Menzah, Tunis, Tunisia
Attendance: 30,066
Referee: Ernst Dörflinger (Switzerland)
12 July 1980

Nigeria	2–0	Tunisia
Boateng 11'; Osigwe 74'
Penalties
	4 – 3

Surulere Stadium, Lagos, Nigeria
Attendance: 52,487
Referee: John Hunting (England)

Nigeria won on penalties after 2–2 on agg. and so advanced to the Second Round.

8 May 1980

Libya	2–1	Gambia
Bani; Rashid		Sarr

11 June Stadium, Tripoli, Libya
Attendance: 7,000
Referee: Gebreysus Tesfaye (Ethiopia)
6 July 1980

Gambia	0–0	Libya

Box Bar Stadium, Banjul, Gambia
Attendance: 1,240
Referee: Modibo N'Diaye (Mali)

Libya won 2–1 on agg. and advanced to the Second Round.

17 May 1980

Ethiopia	0–0	Zambia

Addis Ababa Stadium, Addis Ababa, Ethiopia
Attendance: 20,000
Referee: Hussein Bahig (Egypt)
1 June 1980

Zambia	4–0	Ethiopia
Chola 4'; Chitalu 16', 89'; Kaimana 69'

Dag Hammarskjöld Stadium, Ndola, Zambia
Attendance: 40,000
Referee: Zuberi Bundallah (Tanzania)

Zambia won 4–0 on agg. and advanced to the Second Round.

16 July 1980

Niger	0–0	Somalia

Stade du 29 Julliet, Niamey, Niger
Attendance: 20,000
Referee: Tevi Lawson-Hetcheli (Togo)
27 July 1980

Somalia	1–1	Niger
Mohammed 90'		Kanfideni 30'

Mogadiscio Stadium, Mogadishu, Somalia
Attendance: 13,000
Referee: Demeke Abate (Ethiopia)

Niger advanced to the Second Round due on away goals after 1–1 on agg.

31 May 1980

Sierra Leone	2–2	Algeria
Noah 58'; Dyfan 60'		Bensaoula 72'; Belloumi 85'

Siaka Steven Stadium, Freetown, Sierra Leone
Attendance: 36,500
Referee: Tevi Lawson-Hetcheli (Togo)
13 June 1980

Algeria	3–1	Sierra Leone
Fergani 42'; Bensaoula 47'; Madjer 78'		Johnson 79'

Stade 19 Juin, Oran, Algeria
Attendance: 12,636
Referee: Yousef El-Ghoul (Libya)

Algeria won 5–3 on agg. and advanced to the Second Round.

5 July 1980

Kenya	3–1	Tanzania
Adero 30'; Owino 57', 80' (pen.)		Ali

Nairobi City Stadium, Nairobi, Kenya
Attendance: 8,650
Referee: Babiker El-Bedawi (Sudan)
19 July 1980

Tanzania	5–0	Kenya
Tino 44', 70'; Rishard 70'; Ali 72', 80'

William Mkapa Stadium, Dar es Salaam, Tanzania
Attendance: 5,940
Referee: Winston Gumboh (Zambia)

Tanzania won 6–3 on agg. and advanced to the Second Round.

Egypt	w/o	Ghana
		Withdrew

Egypt advanced to the Second Round, Ghana withdrew.

Madagascar	w/o	Uganda
		Withdrew

Madagascar advanced to the Second Round, Uganda withdrew.

== Second round ==
Team 1	Agg.	Team 2	1st leg	2nd leg
Algeria	3–1	Sudan	2–0	1–1
Niger	2–2 (a)	Togo	0–1	2–1
Liberia	0–1	Guinea	0–0	0–1
Cameroon	2–1	Zimbabwe	2–0	0–1
Morocco	2–2 (5–4 p)	Zambia	2–0	0–2
Nigeria	3–1	Tanzania	1–1	2–0
Madagascar	3–4	Zaire	1–1	2–3
Egypt	w/o	Libya	—	—

12 December 1980

Algeria	2–0	Sudan
Bensaoula 9'; Fergani 45'

Stade 17 Juin, Constantine, Algeria
Attendance: 50,000
Referee: Aissaoui Boudabbous (Tunisia)
28 December 1980

Sudan	1–1	Algeria
Abu Obeida 82'		Gamouh 67'

Khartoum Stadium, Khartoum, Sudan
Attendance: 28,385
Referee: Yousef El-Ghoul (Libya)

Algeria won 3–1 on agg. and advanced to the Third Round.

14 December 1980

Niger	0–1	Togo
		Tao 53'

Stade du 29 Julliet, Niamey, Niger
Attendance: 10,000
Referee: Modibo N'Diaye (Mali)
28 December 1980

Togo	1–2	Niger
Dodji 79'		Adovi 57'; Atcha 82'

Stade Général Eyadema, Lomé, Togo
Attendance: 10,000
Referee: Yardia Thiombiano (Upper Volta)

Niger advanced to the Third Round due on away goals after a draw 2–2 on agg.

7 December 1980

Liberia	0–0	Guinea

Antoinette Tubman Stadium, Monrovia, Liberia
Referee: Tevi Lawson-Hetcheli (Togo)
21 December 1980

Guinea	1–0	Liberia
Bangoura 55'

Stade du 28 Septembre, Conakry, Guinea
Attendance: 15,524
Referee: Benjamin Dwomoh (Ghana)

Guinea won 1–0 on agg. and advanced to the Third Round.

12 October 1980

Cameroon	2–0	Zimbabwe
Onguéné 80'; Mbida 85'

Stade de la Réunification, Douala, Cameroon
Attendance: 47,840
Referee: Festus Okubule (Nigeria)
16 November 1980

Zimbabwe	1–0	Cameroon
Muchineripi 29'

Rufaro Stadium, Harare, Zimbabwe
Attendance: 20,000
Referee: Nyrenda Chayu (Zambia)

Cameroon won 2–1 on agg. and advanced to the Third Round.

16 November 1980

Morocco	2–0	Zambia
Boussati 30'; Limane 34'

Fes Stadium, Fes, Morocco
Attendance: 6,375
Referee: Ali Bin Nasser (Tunisia)
30 November 1980

Zambia	2–0	Morocco
Musonda 60'; Phiri 78'
Penalties
	4 – 5

Independence Stadium, Lusaka, Zambia
Attendance: 6,334
Referee: Gebreysus Tesfaye (Ethiopia)

Morocco won on penalties after a draw 2–2 on agg. and advanced to the Third Round.

6 December 1980

Nigeria	1–1	Tanzania
Lawal 29'		Salim 85'

Surulere Stadium, Lagos, Nigeria
Attendance: 25,235
Referee: Mohamed Larache (Morocco)
20 December 1980

Tanzania	0–2	Nigeria
		Chiedozie 5'; M'Wokozhi 79'

William Mkapa Stadium, Dar es Salaam, Tanzania
Attendance: 30,000
Referee: Hussein Fahmy Bahig (Egypt)

Nigeria won 3–1 on agg. and advanced to the Third Round.

16 November 1980

Madagascar	1–1	Zaire
Kira 26'		Malgbanga 74'

Mahamasina Municipal Stadium, Antananarivo, Madagascar
Attendance: 12,191
Referee: Jean Cyril Monty (Mauritius)
21 December 1980

Zaire	3–2	Madagascar
Suzeti 1'; Mayélé 26'; Malgbanga 75'		Tshikalu 19' (o.g.); Bin Amidou 39'

Stade du 20 Mai, Kinshasa, Zaire
Attendance: 37,754
Referee: Joseph Blanchard-Angaud (Congo)

Zaire won 4–3 on agg. and advanced to the Third Round.

Egypt	w/o	Libya
		Withdrew

Egypt advanced to the Third Round, Libya withdrew.

== Third round ==
Team 1	Agg.	Team 2	1st leg	2nd leg
Algeria	4–1	Niger	4–0	0–1
Guinea	1–2	Nigeria	1–1	0–1
Morocco	1–0	Egypt	1–0	0–0
Zaire	2–6	Cameroon	1–0	1–6

1 May 1981

Algeria	4–0	Niger
Madjer 44' (pen.); Belloumi 46', 77'; Korichi 53'

Stade 17 Juin, Constantine, Algeria
Attendance: 60,000
Referee: Doudou N'Jie (Gambia)
31 May 1981

Niger	1–0	Algeria
Seydou 89'

Stade du 29 Juillet, Niamey, Niger
Attendance: 7,000
Referee: Benjamin Dwomoh (Ghana)

Algeria won 4–1 on agg. and advanced to the Final Round.

12 April 1981

Guinea	1–1	Nigeria
Touré 66' (pen.)		Chiedozie 21'

Stade du 28 Septembre, Conakry, Guinea
Referee: Edward Bukenya (Uganda)
15 April 1981

Nigeria	1–0	Guinea
Nwosu 90'

Surulere Stadium, Lagos, Nigeria
Attendance: 60,000
Referee: Gebreysus Tesfaye (Ethiopia)

Nigeria won 2–1 on agg. and advanced to the Final Round.

26 April 1981

Morocco	1–0	Egypt
Daidi 44'

Stade Mohamed V, Casablanca, Morocco
Attendance: 80,000
Referee: Nyrenda Chayu (Zambia)
8 May 1981

Egypt	0–0	Morocco

Nasser Stadium, Cairo, Egypt
Attendance: 100,000
Referee: Cheikh M'Baye (Senegal)

Morocco won 1–0 on agg. and advanced to the Final Round.

12 April 1981

Zaire	1–0	Cameroon
N'Kama 23'

Stade du 20 Mai, Kinshasa, Zaire
Attendance: 100,000
Referee: Suleiman El-Naim (Sudan)
26 April 1981

Cameroon	6–1	Zaire
Milla 3', 45', 90'; Mbida 13'; Kundé 52', 67' (pen.)		Mukendi 53'

Ahmadou Ahidjo Stadium, Yaoundé, Cameroon
Attendance: 90,000
Referee: Aissaoui Boudabbous (Tunisia)

Cameroon won 6–2 on agg. and advanced to the Final Round.

== Final round ==
Team 1	Agg.	Team 2	1st leg	2nd leg
Nigeria	1–4	Algeria	0–2	1–2
Morocco	1–4	Cameroon	0–2	1–2

10 October 1981

Nigeria	0–2	Algeria
		Belloumi 34'; Zidane 44'

Surulere Stadium, Lagos
Attendance: 80,000
Referee: Luigi Agnolin (Italy)
30 October 1981

Algeria	2–1	Nigeria
Belloumi 9'; Madjer 85'		Owolabi 40'

Stade 17 Juin, Constantine
Attendance: 60,000
Referee: André Daina (Switzerland)

Algeria won 4–1 on aggregate and qualified for the 1982 FIFA World Cup.

15 November 1981

Morocco	0–2	Cameroon
		Milla 15' (pen.); Tokoto 40'

Stade Municipal, Kenitra
Attendance: 16,000
Referee: Cheikh M'Baye (Senegal)
29 November 1981

Cameroon	2–1	Morocco
Aoudou 15' (pen.); Milla 47'		Yaghcha 25' (pen.)

Stade Ahmadou Ahidjo, Yaoundé
Attendance: 70,000
Referee: Hussein Fahmy Bahig (Egypt)

Cameroon won 4–1 on aggregate and qualified for the 1982 FIFA World Cup.

== Qualified teams ==
Team	Qualified as	Qualified on	Previous appearances in FIFA World Cup^{1}
Algeria	Final Round winners	31 October 1981	0 (debut)
Cameroon	Final Round winners	29 November 1981	0 (debut)

^{1} Bold indicates champions for that year. Italic indicates hosts for that year.

== Goalscorers ==
6 goals

- (Cameroon) Roger Milla

5 goals

- (Algeria) Lakhdar Belloumi

3 goals

- (Algeria) Tedj Bensaoula
- (Algeria) Rabah Madjer
- (Cameroon) Emmanuel Kundé
- (Tanzania) Thuwein Ali
- (Zaire) Muteba N'Daye

2 goals

- (Algeria) Ali Fergani
- (Cameroon) Grégoire Mbida
- (Cameroon) Jean Manga Onguéné
- (Guinea) Amara Touré
- (Kenya) Sammy Owino
- (Mozambique) Gil Guiambe
- (Nigeria) John Chiedozie
- (Tanzania) Peter Tino
- (Zaire) Imowa Malgbanga
- (Zaire) Ayel Mayélé
- (Zaire) Kiyika Tokodi
- (Zambia) Godfrey Chitalu

1 goal

- (Algeria) Rabah Gamouh
- (Algeria) Nourredine Kourichi
- (Algeria) Djamel Zidane
- (Cameroon) Théophile Abega
- (Cameroon) Ibrahim Aoudou
- (Cameroon) Jean-Pierre Tokoto
- (The Gambia) Assan Sarr
- (Guinea) Seydouba Bangoura
- (Guinea) Naby Laye Camara
- (Guinea) Mory Koné
- (Guinea) Ibrahima Sory Touré
- (Kenya) Elly Adero
- (Lesotho) Sele Leboela
- (Lesotho) Teboho Masia
- (Libya) Abubaker Bani
- (Libya) Rashid Mohammed Rashid
- (Madagascar) Abdou Bin Amidou
- (Madagascar) Michel Kira
- (Malawi) Stock Dandize
- (Morocco) Mohamed Boussati
- (Morocco) Abdelaziz Daidi
- (Morocco) Ahmed Limane
- (Morocco) Mohamed Timoumi
- (Morocco) Mustapha Yaghcha
- (Mozambique) Francisco Rui Marcos
- (Niger) Bernard Akue Adovi
- (Niger) Atcha
- (Niger) Moussa Kanfideni
- (Niger) Abou Seydou
- (Nigeria) Leotis Boateng
- (Nigeria) Mudashiru Lawal
- (Nigeria) Christian M'Wokozhi
- (Nigeria) Henry Nwosu
- (Nigeria) Emmanuel Osigwe
- (Nigeria) Felix Owolabi
- (Sierra Leone) Ismael Dyfan
- (Sierra Leone) Sentu Johnson
- (Sierra Leone) Akie Noah
- (Somalia) Ismail Mohammed Sharif
- (Sudan) Abu Obeida Adam
- (Tanzania) Mohammed Adolf Rishard
- (Tanzania) Mohammed Salim
- (Togo) Djogou Akoulassi
- (Togo) Saibi Eklou Dodji
- (Tunisia) Témime Lahzami
- (Tunisia) Néjib Liman
- (Zaire) Masengo Ilunga
- (Zaire) Tshilumba Mukendi
- (Zaire) Monduone N'Kama
- (Zaire) M'Peti Suzeti
- (Zambia) Alex Chola
- (Zambia) Pele Kaimana
- (Zambia) Emmanuel Musonda
- (Zambia) Bizwell Phiri
- (Zimbabwe) David Muchineripi

1 own goal

- (Zaire) Kuliwa Tshikalu (playing against Madagascar)

== See also ==
- 1982 FIFA World Cup qualification (UEFA)
- 1982 FIFA World Cup qualification (CONMEBOL)
- 1982 FIFA World Cup qualification (CONCACAF)
- 1982 FIFA World Cup qualification (AFC and OFC)
