= 1988 African Cup of Nations final =

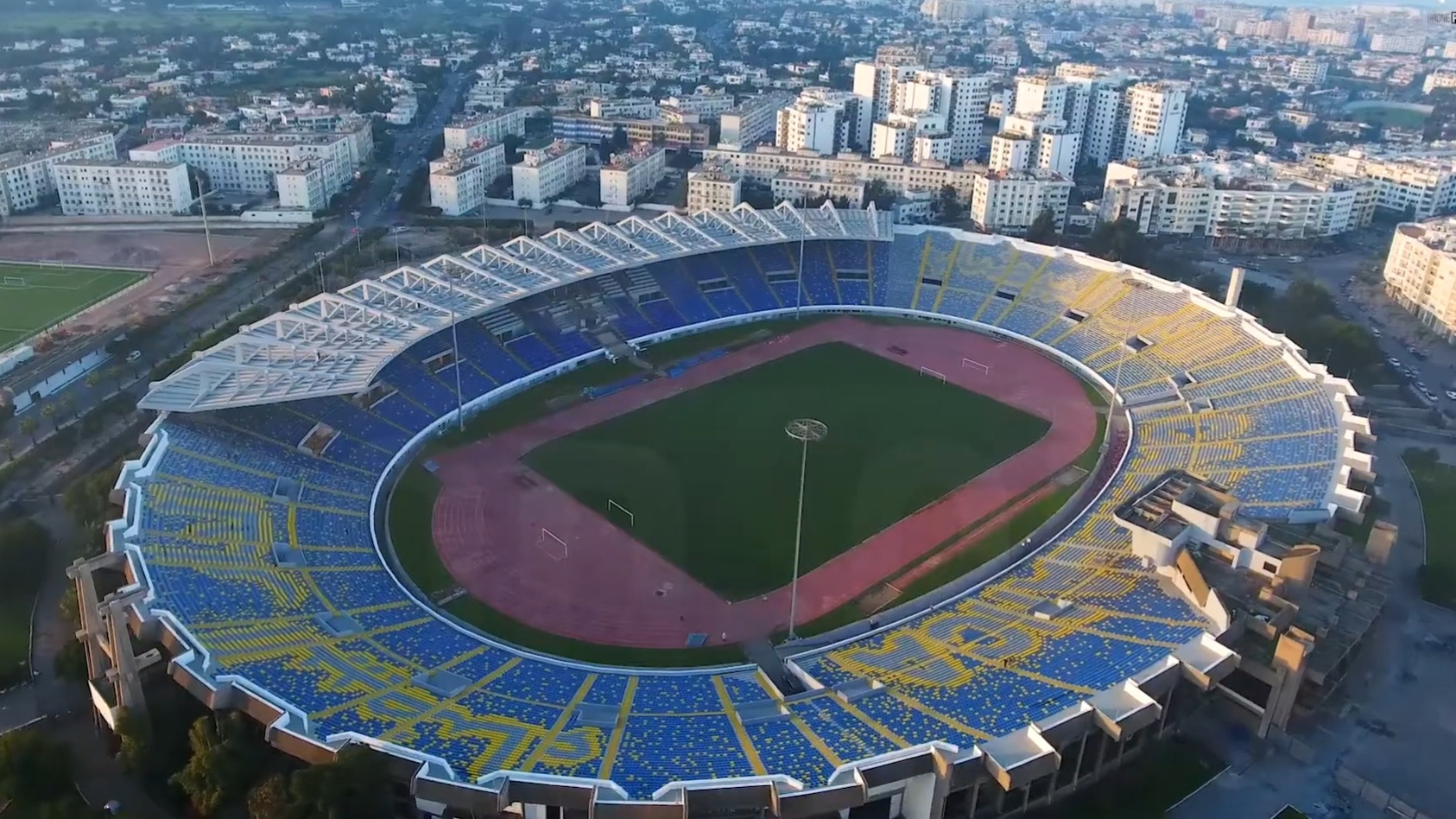
- Event: 1988 African Cup of Nations
Cameroon	Nigeria
(Cameroon)	(Nigeria)
1	0
- Date: 27 March 1988
- Venue: Stade Mohammed V, Casablanca
- Referee: Idrissa Sarr (Mauritania)
- Attendance: 60,000

The 1988 African Cup of Nations final was a football match that took place on 27 March 1988 at Stade Mohammed V in Casablanca, Morocco to determine the winner of the 1988 African Cup of Nations. Cameroon defeated Nigeria 1–0 with a lone goal from Emmanuel Kundé in the 55th minute.

== Road to the final ==
Cameroon		Nigeria	
Opponents	Results	Opponents	Results
Group stage
Egypt	1–0	Kenya	3–0
Nigeria	1–1	Cameroon	1–1
Kenya	0–0	Egypt	0–0
Semi-finals
Morocco	1–0	Algeria	1–1 (9–8 p)

== Match ==
=== Details ===
27 March 1988

Cameroon	1–0	Nigeria
Kundé 55' (pen.)

Stade Mohammed V, Casablanca
Attendance: 60,000
Referee: Idrissa Sarr (Mauritania)

Cameroon	Nigeria

GK	1	Joseph-Antoine Bell
RB	14	Stephen Tataw
CB	4	Benjamin Massing
CB	6	Emmanuel Kundé
LB	20	Charlie Ntamark
RM	10	Louis-Paul Mfédé
CM	12	Cyrille Makanaky
CM	8	Emile Mbouh
CM	2	André Kana-Biyik
LM	19	Bertin Ollé-Ollé	(substituted off) 33'
CF	9	Roger Milla
Substitutions:
MF	21	Richard Abena	(substituted on) 33'
Manager:
(France) Claude Le Roy

GK	1	Peter Rufai
CB	5	Yisa Sofoluwe
CB	4	Stephen Keshi
CB	15	Sunday Eboigbe
RM	12	Augustine Eguavoen
CM	8	Samuel Okwaraji
CM	10	Henry Nwosu
LM	13	Bright Omokaro
RF	18	Ndubuisi Okosieme
CF	14	Rashidi Yekini
LF	17	Folorunso Okenla	(substituted off) 76'
Substitutions:
FW	7	Humphrey Edobor	(substituted on) 76'
Manager:
(West Germany) Manfred Höner
