= Mtemi Ramadhani =

Tanzanian footballer and administrator (born 1956)

Personal information
- Full name: Mtemi Ramadhani Mangi
- Date of birth: 25 November 1956 (age 69)
- Place of birth: Dodoma, Tanganyika Territory
- Position: Midfielder

Senior career*
Years	Team	Apps	(Gls)
–1975	CDA Dodoma		
1976–1979	Waziri Mkuu		
1980	Waziri Mkuu		
1980–1991	Simba		

International career
1979–1980	Tanzania	5+	(0)
- * Club domestic league appearances and goals

Mtemi Ramadhani Mangi (born 25 November 1956), also known as Mtemi Ramadhan, is a Tanzanian former footballer and football administrator. A midfielder, he represented the Tanzania national football team at the 1980 African Cup of Nations, the country's first appearance at the tournament.

== Early life and education ==
Ramadhani was born in Dodoma on 25 November 1956. He attended Rugambwa Primary School and Dodoma Secondary School before studying at the Moshi Co-operative College. Between 1985 and 1988 he studied for a bachelor's degree in commerce at the University of Dar es Salaam.

== Club career ==
He began his career at CDA Dodoma.

From 1976 until 1979, Ramadhani played for Waziri Mkuu, a team composed of employees of the Prime Minister's Office in Dodoma.

In 1980, Ramadhani became involved in an unusual registration dispute after signing registration forms for four clubs during the same transfer period: Waziri Mkuu of Dodoma, Pan African, Young Africans and Simba. At the time, he was away with the Tanzania national team at the 1980 African Cup of Nations in Nigeria. Reports later recalled that officials from the interested clubs went to meet the returning national-team players at the airport, where disputes over player registrations led to a confrontation between club representatives.

The Football Association of Tanzania subsequently required Ramadhani to choose one club, and he selected Simba; however, Young Africans appealed the decision to the National Sports Council, which resulted in Ramadhani receiving a one-year suspension. Accounts differ slightly over the precise chronology that followed, with some sources stating that he briefly returned to Waziri Mkuu before later joining Simba.

He played for Simba from 1980 until 1991. He won the Nyerere Cup with Simba during the 1984 season, and he also won the 1991 CECAFA Club Championship.

== International career ==
Ramadhani made his first known appearance for Tanzania on 14 April 1979 during the 3–2 loss against Mauritius in 1980 African Cup of Nations qualification.

He represented Tanzania at the 1980 African Cup of Nations in Nigeria. He appeared against Nigeria, Egypt and Ivory Coast during the group stage. He also appeared in Tanzania's 1982 FIFA World Cup qualification match against Kenya on 5 July 1980.

== Football administration ==
Ramadhani served as chairman of Tanzania Stars between 1997 and 2000. The club represented Tanzania in the African Cup Winners' Cup in 1997 and 1998. In 2006, he became chief executive of Moro United.

In July 2008, Ramadhani was appointed the director of administration and membership of the Tanzania Football Federation, serving in the position until 2013. He later contested elections for vice-president of the federation and for a position in Simba's administration.

== Career statistics ==
=== International ===
Appearances and goals by national team and year
National team	Year	Apps	Goals
Tanzania	1979	1	0
Tanzania	1980	4	0
Total		5+	0

== Honours ==
Simba

- Nyerere Cup: 1984
- CECAFA Club Championship: 1991
