= Seydouba =

Seydouba is an African masculine given name. Notable people with the name include:

- Seydouba Bangoura, Guinean footballer
- Seydouba Cissé (born 2001), Guinean footballer
- Seydouba Soumah (born 1991), Guinean footballer
