= Okosieme =

Okosieme is a surname. Notable people with the surname include:

- Ndubuisi Okosieme (born 1966), Nigerian footballer
- Nkiru Okosieme (born 1972), Nigerian footballer
