= Mamane (name) =

Mamane is both a given name and a surname. Notable people with the name include:

- Mamane Ali, Nigerien footballer
- Mamane Sani Ali (born 1968), Nigerien sprinter
- Mamane Barka (1958/1959–2018), Nigerien musician
- Mamane Oumarou (born 1946), Nigerien politician
- Abdourahmane Mamane (born 1997), Nigerien footballer
- Mariama Mamane, Nigerien environmentalist
