= 1980 African Cup of Nations qualification =

Football tournament

This page details the qualifying process for the 1980 Africa Cup of Nations in Nigeria. Nigeria, as hosts, and Ghana, as title holders, qualified automatically.

== Qualifying tournament ==
Ghana qualified as holders
Nigeria qualified as hosts

=== Preliminary round ===
| Team 1 | Agg. | Team 2 | 1st leg | 2nd leg |
|---|---|---|---|---|
| Madagascar | 3–6 | Malawi | 2–1 | 1–5 |
| Mauritius | 2–2 (a) | Lesotho | 0–1 | 2–1 |
| Benin | w/o | Niger | — | — |

3 December 1978

| Madagascar | 2–1 | Malawi |
|---|---|---|
| Goal | | Phiri |

Antananarivo
17 December 1978

| Malawi | 5–1 | Madagascar |
|---|---|---|
| Phiri; Billie; Chamangwana; Gondwe | | Goal |

Kamuzu Stadium, Blantyre

Malawi won 6–3 on aggregate.

3 December 1978

| Mauritius | 0–1 | Lesotho |

Port Louis
17 December 1978

| Lesotho | 1–2 | Mauritius |
|---|---|---|
| | | Jacquotte ? |

Maseru

Mauritius won by away goals rule after 2–2 on aggregate.

| Benin | Cancelled | Niger |
|---|---|---|
| | | Withdrew |

Benin advanced after Niger withdrew.

=== First round ===
| Team 1 | Agg. | Team 2 | 1st leg | 2nd leg |
|---|---|---|---|---|
| Mauritania | 3–6 | Morocco | 2–2 | 1–4 |
| Libya | 3–2 | Ethiopia | 2–1 | 1–1 |
| Guinea | 3–3 (6–5 p) | Cameroon | 3–0 | 0–3 |
| Malawi | 0–4 | Zambia | 0–2 | 0–2 |
| Benin | 2–4 | Ivory Coast | 1–0 | 1–4 |
| Togo | 2–1 | Gambia | 2–0 | 0–1 |
| Congo | 5–6 | Zaire | 4–2 | 1–4 |
| Mauritius | 3–6 | Tanzania | 3–2 | 0–4 |
| Algeria | w/o | Burundi | — | — |
| Egypt | w/o | Somalia | — | — |
| Kenya | w/o | Tunisia | — | — |
| Sudan | w/o | Uganda | — | — |

18 February 1979

| Mauritania | 2–2 | Morocco |
|---|---|---|
| Lamine | | Belhiouane 6'; Anafal 48' |

Stade de la Capitale, Nouakchott
8 April 1979

| Morocco | 4–1 | Mauritania |
|---|---|---|
| Anafal 1'; Acila 6'; Saber 12'; Faras 26' | | Diop |

Stade d'Honneur, Casablanca

Morocco won 6–3 on aggregate.

15 April 1979

| Libya | 2–1 | Ethiopia |
|---|---|---|
| Al-Riani; Belhaj | | Goal |

11 June Stadium, Tripoli
29 April 1979

| Ethiopia | 1–1 | Libya |
|---|---|---|
| Goal | | Al-Riani |

Addis Ababa Stadium, Addis Ababa

Libya won 3–2 on aggregate.

15 April 1979

| Guinea | 3–0 | Cameroon |

Stade du 28 Septembre, Conakry
29 April 1979

| Cameroon | 3–0 | Guinea |
|---|---|---|
| Milla 14', 31', 41' |
Penalties
| | 5–6 |

Ahmadou Ahidjo Stadium, Yaoundé

Guinea won 6–5 on penalty shootout after 3–3 on aggregate.

15 April 1979

| Malawi | 0–2 | Zambia |
|---|---|---|
| | | Chitalu; Kaumba |

Kamuzu Stadium, Blantyre
29 April 1979

| Zambia | 2–0 | Malawi |
|---|---|---|
| Chitalu; Simbule 22' |

Ndola

Zambia won 4–0 on aggregate.

15 April 1979

| Benin | 1–0 | Ivory Coast |

Cotonou
29 April 1979

| Ivory Coast | 4–1 | Benin |

Stade Félix Houphouët-Boigny, Abidjan

Ivory Coast won 4–2 on aggregate.

16 April 1979

| Togo | 2–0 | Gambia |

Stade Général Eyadema, Lomé
29 April 1979

| Gambia | 1–0 | Togo |

Box Bar Stadium, Banjul

Togo won 2–1 on aggregate.

15 April 1979

| Congo | 4–2 | Zaire |

Stade Alphonse Massemba-Débat, Brazzaville
29 April 1979

| Zaire | 4–1 | Congo |
|---|---|---|
| Ngeleme 44'; Mukendi; Babo | | Bahamboula 14' |

Stade du 20 Mai, Kinshasa

Zaire won 6–5 on aggregate.

16 April 1979

| Mauritius | 3–2 | Tanzania |
|---|---|---|
| Maurel; L'Enflé; Ramrekha |

Stade George V, Curepipe
Attendance: 50,000
29 April 1979

| Tanzania | 4–0 | Mauritius |

National Stadium, Dar es Salaam

Tanzania won 6–3 on aggregate.

| Algeria | Cancelled | Burundi |
|---|---|---|
| | | Withdrew |

Algeria advanced after Burundi withdrew.

| Egypt | Cancelled | Somalia |
|---|---|---|
| | | Withdrew |

Egypt advanced after Somalia withdrew.

| Kenya | Cancelled | Tunisia |
|---|---|---|
| | | Disqualified |

Kenya advanced: Tunisia were disqualified after they were banned from CAF competitions for two years for walking off the pitch to protest the officiating during the third-place match of the 1978 African Cup of Nations.

| Sudan | Cancelled | Uganda |
|---|---|---|
| | | Withdrew |

Sudan advanced after Uganda withdrew.

=== Second round ===
| Team 1 | Agg. | Team 2 | 1st leg | 2nd leg |
|---|---|---|---|---|
| Algeria | 3–2 | Libya | 3–1 | 0–1 |
| Morocco | 8–2 | Togo | 7–0 | 1–2 |
| Sudan | 2–4 | Ivory Coast | 2–0 | 0–4 |
| Kenya | 3–4 | Egypt | 3–1 | 0–3 |
| Zaire | 4–5 | Guinea | 3–2 | 1–3 |
| Tanzania | 2–1 | Zambia | 1–0 | 1–1 |

24 June 1979

| Algeria | 3–1 | Libya |
|---|---|---|
| Belloumi 20'; Douadi 33', 50' | | Al-Issawi |

Stade 5 Juillet 1962, Algiers
8 July 1979

| Libya | 1–0 | Algeria |
|---|---|---|
| Lagha 85' (pen.) |

11 June Stadium, Tripoli

Algeria won 3–2 on aggregate.

24 June 1979

| Morocco | 7–0 | Togo |
|---|---|---|
| Faras 9'; Acila 16'; Dolmy 44'; Jebrane 54', 70', 86'; Labied 80' |

Stade El Bachir, Mohammedia
6 July 1979

| Togo | 2–1 | Morocco |
|---|---|---|
| Goal | | Beggar |

Stade Général Eyadema, Lomé

Morocco won 8–2 on aggregate.

29 June 1979

| Sudan | 2–0 | Ivory Coast |

Khartoum Stadium, Khartoum
6 July 1979

| Ivory Coast | 4–0 | Sudan |

Stade Félix Houphouët-Boigny, Abidjan

Ivory Coast won 4–2 on aggregate.

30 June 1979

| Kenya | 3–1 | Egypt |
|---|---|---|
| Lukoye | | Khalil 60' |

Nairobi City Stadium, Nairobi
13 July 1979

| Egypt | 3–0 | Kenya |
|---|---|---|
| Khalil 27'; Mokhtar 45'; Kamel 47' |

Zamalek Stadium, Cairo
Referee: Tesfaye Gebreyesus (Ethiopia)

Egypt won 4–3 on aggregate.

5 August 1979

| Zaire | 3–2 | Guinea |
|---|---|---|
| Ayel 18', 81'; Kiyika 88' | | Bangoura 42', 64' |

Stade du 20-Mai, Kinshasa
19 August 1979

| Guinea | 3–1 | Zaire |

Stade du 28 Septembre, Conakry

Guinea won 5–4 on aggregate.

11 August 1979

| Tanzania | 1–0 | Zambia |

National Stadium, Dar es Salaam
26 August 1979

| Zambia | 1–1 | Tanzania |
|---|---|---|
| Chola 43' | | Tino 84' |

Ndola

Tanzania won 2–1 on aggregate.

== Qualified teams ==
- Algeria
- Egypt
- Ghana (holders)
- Guinea
- Ivory Coast
- Morocco
- Nigeria (hosts)
- Tanzania
