= Richard Abena =

Cameroonian footballer

Personal information
- Date of birth: 25 May 1960 (age 66)
- Position: Defender

Senior career*
Years	Team	Apps	(Gls)
- Canon Yaoundé

International career
1987–1988	Cameroon		
Medal record
Men's football
Representing Cameroon
Africa Cup of Nations
Winner	1988 Morocco
- * Club domestic league appearances and goals

Richard Abena (born 25 May 1960) is a retired Cameroonian football defender. Capped for Cameroon in 1987 and 1988, he played in the victorious 1988 African Cup of Nations final.

== Honours ==
Cameroon

- Africa Cup of Nations: 1988
