= Kiyika Tokodi =

Congolese footballer

Kiyika Tokodi is a Congolese former footballer who played as a midfielder for Belgian club K.A.A. Gent between 1980 and 1986.

He represented the Zaire national team in international competition, appearing in a 1986 African Cup of Nations qualifying match versus the Republic of the Congo in Brazzaville, scoring a goal in a 5–2 victory. He also scored two goals, both from penalties, in a 5–2 victory over Mozambique in a 1982 World Cup qualifying match on 13 July 1980 in Kinshasa. In addition, he scored the winning goal in a 3–2 victory over Guinea in a 1980 African Cup of Nations qualifying match on 5 August 1979.

== Career statistics ==
=== International goals ===
Scores and results list Zaire's goal tally first, score column indicates score after each Tokodi goal.

List of international goals scored by Kiyika Tokodi
No.	Date	Venue	Opponent	Score	Result	Competition
1	5 August 1979	Stade Tata Raphaël, Kinshasa, Zaire	Guinea	3–2	3–2	1980 Africa Cup of Nations qualification
2	14 June 2014	Stade Tata Raphaël, Kinshasa, Zaire	Mozambique	1–1	5–2	1982 FIFA World Cup qualification
3	14 June 2014	Stade Tata Raphaël, Kinshasa, Zaire	Mozambique	3–2	5–2	1982 FIFA World Cup qualification
4	31 March 1985	Stade Alphonse Massemba-Débat, Brazzaville, Congo	Congo	4–0	5–2	1986 Africa Cup of Nations qualification
