= Odegbami =

Surname list

- Gender: Male
- Language: Yoruba

Origin
- Origin: Nigerian
- Region of origin: South-West Nigeria

Odegbami is a Yoruba surname. Notable people with the surname include:

- Amos Olatubosun Tutuola Odegbami (1920–1997), Nigerian writer
- Segun Odegbami (born 1952), Nigerian footballer
- Wole Odegbami (born 1962), Nigerian footballer
