= Cvijan Milošević =

Yugoslav and Bosnian football player

Personal information
- Date of birth: 27 October 1963 (age 63)
- Place of birth: Tuzla, SFR Yugoslavia
- Position: Midfielder

Senior career*
Years	Team	Apps	(Gls)
1981–1990	Sloboda Tuzla	167	(29)
1990–1995	RFC Liège	149	(9)
1995–1996	Royal Antwerp	24	(1)
1996–1999	Germinal Ekeren	84	(7)
1999–2001	Westerlo	42	(2)
Total		466	(48)

International career
1988	Yugoslavia	1	(0)
- * Club domestic league appearances and goals

Cvijan Milošević (Serbian Cyrillic: Цвиjaн Mилoшeвић; born 27 October 1963) is a Yugoslav and Bosnian retired football player. He was capped once for the Yugoslavia national team.

== Club career ==
After being one of the main playmakers of FK Sloboda Tuzla for almost a decade in the Yugoslav First League, in January 1990 he moved to Belgium where he played for several clubs in the Belgian First Division, namely R.F.C. de Liège, Royal Antwerp FC, Germinal Ekeren and K.V.C. Westerlo. While at R.F.C. de Liège he helped them win the 1989–90 Belgian Cup. He won the Belgian Cup again with Germinal Ekeren in 1997.

== International career ==
Milošević made his senior debut for Yugoslavia in an August 1988 friendly match away against Switzerland, coming on as a late substitute for Vladislav Đukić. It was played a month before the 1988 Summer Olympics in Seoul and remained his sole 'A' international appearance.

He later played in two games, both as a second-half substitute, at Olympic football tournament.

== Personal life ==
Milošević's son, Deni, is a professional footballer who plays as an attacking midfielder for Željezničar, and also played for the Bosnia and Herzegovina national team.

== Honours ==
RFC Liège

- Belgian Cup: 1989–90

Germinal Ekeren

- Belgian Cup: 1996–97
