= 1988 African Cup of Nations =

16th edition of the Africa Cup of Nations

1988 كأس أمم إفريقيا

Tournament details
- Host country: Morocco
- Dates: 13–27 March
- Teams: 8
- Venues: 2 (in 2 host cities)

Final positions
- Champions: Cameroon (2nd title)
- Runners-up: Nigeria
- Third place: Algeria
- Fourth place: Morocco

Tournament statistics
- Matches played: 16
- Goals scored: 23 (1.44 per match)
- Top scorer(s): (Algeria) Lakhdar Belloumi (Cameroon) Roger Milla (Egypt) Gamal Abdelhamid (Ivory Coast) Abdoulaye Traoré (2 goals each)
- Best player: (Cameroon) Roger Milla
- Best goalkeeper: (Cameroon) Joseph-Antoine Bell

The 1988 African Cup of Nations was the 16th edition of the African Cup of Nations, the football championship run by the Confederation of African Football (CAF). It was hosted by Morocco, who replaced original host Zambia. Just like in 1986, the field of eight teams was split into two groups of four. The tournament final was held in Casablanca at Stade Mohammed V.

Cameroon won a second championship, defeating Nigeria 1−0 in the final.

This edition of the tournament has the fewest goals-per-game average to date in Africa Cup of Nations history.

== Host selection ==
The original host was Zambia but after their withdrawal in December 1986 due to financial issues, the Confederation of African Football approached Algeria which agreed to host the tournament. However, in February 1987 the CAF rescinded this decision following a dispute with Algeria which protested the CAF's decision to order a replay of the first leg match of the 1987 All-Africa Games qualification against Tunisia. CAF had made this decision following Tunisia's protest that Algeria had fielded two professional players. Morocco was chosen in the end to host the 1988 Africa Cup of Nations replacing Algeria.

== Qualified teams ==
The 8 qualified teams are:

Team	Qualified as	Qualified on	Previous appearances in tournament (Note: Bold indicates champion for that year, Italic indicates host.)
Morocco	Hosts		5 (1972, **1976**, 1978, 1980, 1986)
Egypt	Holders	21 March 1986	10 (**1957**, **1959**, 1962, 1963, 1970, 1974, 1976, 1980, 1984, **1986**)
Algeria	2nd round winners	14 April 1987	5 (1968, 1980, 1982, 1984, 1986)
Cameroon	2nd round winners	18 July 1987	5 (1970, 1972, 1982, **1984**, 1986)
Kenya	2nd round winners	18 July 1987	1 (1972)
Nigeria	2nd round winners	18 July 1987	6 (1963, 1976, 1978, **1980**, 1982, 1984)
Ivory Coast	2nd round winners	19 July 1987	7 (1965, 1968, 1970, 1974, 1980, 1984, 1986)
Zaire	2nd round winners	19 July 1987	6 (1965, **1968**, 1970, 1972, **1974**, 1976)

== Venues ==
The competition was played in two venues in Casablanca and Rabat.

Casablanca	1988 African Cup of Nations is located in Morocco
Stade Mohammed V	1988 African Cup of Nations is located in Morocco
Capacity: 80,000	1988 African Cup of Nations is located in Morocco
Rabat	1988 African Cup of Nations is located in Morocco
Stade Moulay Abdellah	1988 African Cup of Nations is located in Morocco
Capacity: 52,000	1988 African Cup of Nations is located in Morocco

== Group stage ==
=== Tiebreakers ===
If two or more teams finished level on points after completion of the group matches, the following tie-breakers were used to determine the final ranking:

1. Goal difference in all group matches
2. Greater number of goals scored in all group matches
3. Drawing of lots

=== Group A ===
Pos	Team	Pld	W	D	L	GF	GA	GD	Pts	Qualification
1	Morocco (H)	3	1	2	0	2	1	+1	4	Advance to Knockout stage
2	Algeria	3	1	1	1	2	2	0	3	Advance to Knockout stage
3	Ivory Coast	3	0	3	0	2	2	0	3	
4	Zaire	3	0	2	1	2	3	−1	2	

Rules for classification: Group stage tiebreakers
(H) Hosts
13 March 1988

Morocco	1–1	Zaire
Merry 43' (pen.)	Report	Lutonadio 88'

Stade Mohammed V, Casablanca
Attendance: 80,000
Referee: Gebreyesus Tesfaye (Ethiopia)

13 March 1988

Ivory Coast	1–1	Algeria
A. Traoré 48'	Report	Belloumi 16'

Stade Mohammed V, Casablanca
Attendance: 40,000
Referee: Eganaden Cadressen (Mauritius)

16 March 1988

Ivory Coast	1–1	Zaire
A. Traoré 74'	Report	Kabongo 37'

Stade Mohammed V, Casablanca
Attendance: 45,000
Referee: Ali Bennaceur (Tunisia)

16 March 1988

Morocco	1–0	Algeria
El Haddaoui 52'	Report

Stade Mohammed V, Casablanca
Attendance: 78,000
Referee: Idrissa Sarr (Mauritania)

19 March 1988

Algeria	1–0	Zaire
Ferhaoui 36'	Report

Stade Mohammed V, Casablanca
Attendance: 75,000
Referee: Hugues Joseph Mongbo (Benin)

19 March 1988

Morocco	0–0	Ivory Coast
	Report

Stade Mohammed V, Casablanca
Attendance: 80,000
Referee: Ally Hafidhi (Tanzania)

Note: Algeria qualified by drawing of lots.

=== Group B ===
Pos	Team	Pld	W	D	L	GF	GA	GD	Pts	Qualification
1	Nigeria	3	1	2	0	4	1	+3	4	Advance to Knockout stage
2	Cameroon	3	1	2	0	2	1	+1	4	Advance to Knockout stage
3	Egypt	3	1	1	1	3	1	+2	3	
4	Kenya	3	0	1	2	0	6	−6	1	

Rules for classification: Group stage tiebreakers
14 March 1988

Cameroon	1–0	Egypt
Milla 5'	Report

Stade Moulay Abdellah, Rabat
Attendance: 5,000
Referee: Idrissa Traoré (Mali)

14 March 1988

Nigeria	3–0	Kenya
Yekini 6'; Edobor 13'; Okosieme 33'	Report

Stade Moulay Abdellah, Rabat
Attendance: 4,000
Referee: Badara Sène (Senegal)

17 March 1988

Cameroon	1–1	Nigeria
Milla 21'	Report	Okwaraji 2'

Stade Moulay Abdellah, Rabat
Attendance: 13,000
Referee: Bester Kalombo (Malawi)

17 March 1988

Egypt	3–0	Kenya
Abdelhamid 2', 65'; Younes 58'	Report

Stade Moulay Abdellah, Rabat
Attendance: 12,000
Referee: Simon Bantsimba (Congo)

20 March 1988

Cameroon	0–0	Kenya
	Report

Stade Moulay Abdellah, Rabat
Attendance: 25,000
Referee: Badou Jasseh (Gambia)

20 March 1988

Nigeria	0–0	Egypt
	Report

Stade Moulay Abdellah, Rabat
Attendance: 30,000
Referee: Ali Bangoura (Guinea)

== Knockout stage ==
=== Bracket ===
Semi-finals
23 March – Rabat
Nigeria (p)	1 (9)
Algeria	1 (8)
23 March – Casablanca
Morocco	0
Cameroon	1

Final
27 March – Casablanca
Nigeria	0
Cameroon	1
Third place
26 March – Casablanca
Algeria (p)	1 (4)
Morocco	1 (3)

=== Semi-finals ===
23 March 1988

Nigeria	1–1 (a.e.t.)	Algeria
Belgherbi 36' (o.g.)	Report	Maâtar 86'
Penalties
Eguavoen (penalty scored); Odu (penalty missed); Uwe (penalty scored); Sofoluwe (penalty missed); Yekini (penalty scored); Okwaraji (penalty scored); Nwosu (penalty scored); Omokaro (penalty scored); Okafor (penalty scored); Rufai (penalty scored); Eguavoen (penalty scored)	9–8	(penalty scored) Belloumi; (penalty missed) Belgherbi; (penalty missed) Maâtar; (penalty scored) Yahi; (penalty scored) Menad; (penalty scored) Bouafia; (penalty scored) Medane; (penalty scored) Chaib; (penalty scored) Megharia; (penalty scored) Drid; (penalty missed) Belloumi

Stade Moulay Abdellah, Rabat
Attendance: 35,000
Referee: Badara Sène (Senegal)

23 March 1988

Morocco	0–1	Cameroon
	Report	Makanaky 78'

Stade Mohammed V, Casablanca
Attendance: 45,000
Referee: Eganaden Cadressen (Mauritius)

=== Third place match ===
26 March 1988

Morocco	1–1 (a.e.t.)	Algeria
Nader 67'	Report	Belloumi 87'
Penalties
El Gharef (penalty missed); Benabicha (penalty missed); Ouadani (penalty scored); El Maataoui (penalty scored); Timoumi (penalty scored); Nader (penalty missed)	3–4	(penalty scored) Yahi; (penalty missed) Djahmoune; (penalty scored) Merzekane; (penalty scored) Chaib; (penalty missed) Megharia; (penalty scored) Belgherbi

Stade Mohammed V, Casablanca
Attendance: 10,000
Referee: Ally Hafidhi (Tanzania)

=== Final ===
27 March 1988

Cameroon	1–0	Nigeria
Kundé 55' (pen.)	Report

Stade Mohammed V, Casablanca
Attendance: 50,000
Referee: Idrissa Sarr (Mauritania)

== Goalscorers ==
There were 23 goals scored in 16 matches, for an average of 1.44 goals per match.

2 goals

- (Algeria) Lakhdar Belloumi
- (Cameroon) Roger Milla
- (Ivory Coast) Abdoulaye Traoré
- (Egypt) Gamal Abdelhamid

1 goal

- (Algeria) Abdelkader Ferhaoui
- (Algeria) Rachid Maâtar
- (Cameroon) Emmanuel Kundé
- (Cameroon) Cyrille Makanaky
- (Egypt) Ayman Younes
- (Morocco) Mustafa El Haddaoui
- (Morocco) Abdelkrim Merry
- (Morocco) Hassan Nader
- (Nigeria) Humphrey Edobor
- (Nigeria) Ndubuisi Okosieme
- (Nigeria) Samuel Okwaraji
- (Nigeria) Rashidi Yekini
- (Zaire) Eugène Kabongo
- (Zaire) Lutonadio

1 own goal

- (Algeria) Abderrazak Belgherbi (against Nigeria)

== Team of the Tournament ==
Goalkeeper

- (Cameroon) Joseph-Antoine Bell

Defenders

- (Morocco) Tijani El Maataoui
- (Cameroon) Emmanuel Kundé
- (Zaire) Buana N'Galula
- (Cameroon) Stephen Tataw

Midfielders

- (Zaire) Jacques Kinkomba Kingambo
- (Cameroon) Emile Mbouh
- (Nigeria) Henry Nwosu
- (Cameroon) Louis-Paul M'Fédé

Forwards

- (Cameroon) Roger Milla
- (Morocco) Aziz Bouderbala
