= Rachid Maâtar =

Algerian footballer and manager (born 1959)

Personal information
- Date of birth: 27 January 1959 (age 67)
- Place of birth: Nancy, France
- Position: Midfielder

Youth career
- Nancy

Senior career*
Years	Team	Apps	(Gls)
1979–1980	Chaumont	28	(0)
1980–1982	Saint-Dié	62	(5)
1982–1983	Angoulême	11	(0)
1983–1985	Nancy	–	(-)
1985–1987	Béziers	42	(2)
1987–1988	Saint-Dizier	8	(0)
1988–1989	Nancy	–	(-)

International career
1985–1988	Algeria	9	(1)

Managerial career
- 2007–: Nancy B
- * Club domestic league appearances and goals

Rachid Maâtar (Arabic: رشيد معطر, born 27 January 1959) is a football manager and former footballer who played as a midfielder. He is currently the manager of Nancy's reserve team.

Born in France, Maâtar was an Algerian international, playing at the 1988 African Cup of Nations.
