= John Buana N'Galula =

Congolese footballer (born 1968)

Buana N'Galula
Personal information
- Full name: John Buana N'Galula
- Date of birth: 23 June 1968 (age 58)
- Place of birth: Kinshasa, DR Congo
- Position: Defender

Senior career*
Years	Team	Apps	(Gls)
1986–1988	DC Motema Pembe	54	(3)
1988–1992	Boom	132	(22)
1992–1993	Sporting Lokeren	21	(3)
1993–1995	Lommelse	27	(1)

International career
1988–1995	Zaire	20	(1)
- * Club domestic league appearances and goals

John Buana N'Galula (born 23 June 1968) is a retired Zaire international footballer, who played as a defender.

== Club career ==
Born in Kinshasa, moved to Belgium at the age of 23, signing with K. Boom F.C. He would spend the rest of his playing career in the Belgian Pro League, representing K.S.C. Lokeren Oost-Vlaanderen and K.F.C. Lommel S.K.

== International career ==
Buana N'Galula played for Zaire at the 1988 and 1992 Africa Cup of Nations finals.

== Personal ==
Buana N'Galula was granted Belgian citizenship in 2000.
