= Monduone N'Kama =

Congolese footballer

Personal information
- Full name: Monduone N'Kama
- Date of birth: 28 July 1960 (age 66)
- Place of birth: Léopoldville, Congo-Léopoldville
- Height: 1.84 m (6 ft 0 in)
- Position: Forward

Senior career*
Years	Team	Apps	(Gls)
1980–1986	Vita Club	58	(33)
1986–1988	Vitória Guimarães	44	(10)
1988–1989	Estrela da Amadora	2	(0)
1989–1990	Sporting Covilhã	24	(4)
1990–1991	Olivais e Moscavide	19	(4)
1991–1992	CDR Alferrarede		
1992–1993	Santa Maria Galegos FC		

International career
1981–1988	Zaire		
- * Club domestic league appearances and goals

Monduone N'Kama (born 23 July 1960) is a retired Zaire international footballer, who played as a forward.

== Club career ==
Born in Kinshasa, N'Kama began his career with AS Vita Club. He moved to play in Portugal at the age of 25, signing with Vitória S.C. He would spend two seasons with Vitória playing in the Portuguese Liga and UEFA Cup, before moving to C.F. Estrela da Amadora, where he would only make two substitute appearances in a disappointing season. He finished his career in the Portuguese second division, playing for S.C. Covilhã and C.D. Olivais e Moscavide.

== International career ==
N'Kama played for Zaire at the 1988 Africa Cup of Nations finals.
