= Manfred Höner =

German footballer and manager

Personal information
- Place of birth: Germany

Managerial career
- Years: Team
- 1987–1988: Nigeria
- 1991: Eintracht Trier
Medal record
Men's football
Representing Nigeria (as manager)
Africa Cup of Nations
Runner-up	1988

Manfred Höner (1941-6 March 2021) was a German former football coach.

Höner managed the Nigeria national team from 1987 to 1988, leading the team to second place at the 1988 Africa Cup of Nations, losing to Cameroon in the final. He was head coach when Nigeria made an appearance at the 1988 Summer Olympics. Höner also managed German club Eintracht Trier in 1991.

In 2004, Höner was the technical director of the Qatar Football Association.

== Honours ==
Nigeria

- Africa Cup of Nations runner-up: 1988
