= 1982 FIFA World Cup qualification (CONMEBOL) =

Tournament details
- Dates: 8 February 1981 – 13 September 1981
- Teams: 9 (from 1 confederation)

Tournament statistics
- Matches played: 18
- Goals scored: 42 (2.33 per match)
- Top scorer(s): (Brazil) Zico (5 goals)

Listed below are the dates and results for the 1982 FIFA World Cup qualification rounds for the South American zone (CONMEBOL). For an overview of the qualification rounds, see the article 1982 FIFA World Cup qualification.

A total of 10 CONMEBOL teams entered the competition. The South American zone was allocated 4 places (out of 24) in the final tournament. Argentina, the defending champions, qualified automatically, leaving 3 spots open for competition between 9 teams.

The 9 teams were divided into 3 groups of 3 teams each. The teams would play against each other on a home-and-away basis. The group winners would qualify.

== Group 1 ==
Zico in action during Venezuela 0 v 1 Brazil in Caracas

Rank	Team	Pts	Pld	W	D	L	GF	GA	GD
1	Brazil	8	4	4	0	0	11	2	+9
2	Bolivia	2	4	1	0	3	5	6	−1
3	Venezuela	2	4	1	0	3	1	9	−8

8 February 1981

Venezuela	0–1	Brazil
		Zico 82' (pen.)

Olympic Stadium, Caracas, Venezuela
Attendance: 30,000
Referee: Barreto Ruiz (Uruguay)

15 February 1981

Bolivia	3–0	Venezuela
Aguilar 38'; Aragonés 67'; Reynaldo 84'

Estadio Hernando Siles, La Paz, Bolivia
Attendance: 40,000
Referee: Valdez Barrios (Paraguay)

22 February 1981

Bolivia	1–2	Brazil
Aragonés 27'		Sócrates 6'; Reinaldo 60'

Estadio Hernando Siles, La Paz, Bolivia
Attendance: 50,000
Referee: Labo Revoredo (Peru)

15 March 1981

Venezuela	1–0	Bolivia
Acosta 42'

Olympic Stadium, Caracas, Venezuela
Attendance: 30,000
Referee: Jacome Guerrero (Ecuador)

22 March 1981

Brazil	3–1	Bolivia
Zico 26' (pen.), 62', 85'		Aragonés 68' (pen.)

Maracanã Stadium, Rio de Janeiro, Brazil
Attendance: 121,773
Referee: Castro Makuc (Chile)

29 March 1981

Brazil	5–0	Venezuela
Tita 35', 57'; Sócrates 55'; Zico 72' (pen.); Júnior 84'

Estádio Serra Dourada, Goiânia, Brazil
Attendance: 34,229
Referee: Romero (Argentina)

Brazil qualified.

== Group 2 ==
Rank	Team	Pts	Pld	W	D	L	GF	GA	GD
1	Peru	6	4	2	2	0	5	2	+3
2	Uruguay	4	4	1	2	1	5	5	0
3	Colombia	2	4	0	2	2	4	7	−3

26 July 1981

Colombia	1 – 1	Peru
Herrera 64'		La Rosa 86'

Estadio El Campín, Bogotá, Colombia
Attendance: 20,000
Referee: Ithurralde (Argentina)

9 August 1981

Uruguay	3 – 2	Colombia
Paz 20'; Morales 80', 88' (pen.)		Sarmiento 40'; Herrera 59'

Estadio Centenario, Montevideo, Uruguay
Attendance: 68,000
Referee: Scolfaro (Brazil)

16 August 1981

Peru	2 – 0	Colombia
Barbadillo 5'; Uribe 72' (pen.)

Estadio Nacional, Lima, Peru
Attendance: 43,942
Referee: Llobregat Vicedo (Venezuela)

23 August 1981

Uruguay	1 – 2	Peru
Victorino 67'		La Rosa 39'; Uribe 47'

Estadio Centenario, Montevideo, Uruguay
Attendance: 67,938
Referee: Silvagno Cavanna (Chile)

6 September 1981

Peru	0 – 0	Uruguay

Estadio Nacional, Lima, Peru
Attendance: 44,325
Referee: Coelho (Brazil)

13 September 1981

Colombia	1 – 1	Uruguay
Herrera 12' (pen.)		Victorino 43' (pen.)

Estadio El Campín, Bogotá, Colombia
Attendance: 10,000
Referee: Wright (Brazil)

Peru qualified.

== Group 3 ==
Rank	Team	Pts	Pld	W	D	L	GF	GA	GD
1	Chile	7	4	3	1	0	6	0	+6
2	Ecuador	3	4	1	1	2	2	5	−3
3	Paraguay	2	4	1	0	3	3	6	−3

17 May 1981

Ecuador	1 – 0	Paraguay
Klinger 48'

Estadio Modelo, Guayaquil, Ecuador
Attendance: 55,000
Referee: Barrancos (Bolivia)

24 May 1981

Ecuador	0 – 0	Chile

Estadio Modelo, Guayaquil, Ecuador
Attendance: 48,000
Referee: Cardellino (Uruguay)

31 May 1981

Paraguay	3 – 1	Ecuador
Michelagnoli 47'; Morel 64'; Romerito 81'		Nieves 88'

Estadio Defensores del Chaco, Asunción, Paraguay
Attendance: 40,000
Referee: Cerullo Giuliano (Uruguay)

7 June 1981

Paraguay	0 – 1	Chile
		Yáñez 70'

Estadio Defensores del Chaco, Asunción, Paraguay
Attendance: 50,000
Referee: Espósito (Argentina)

14 June 1981

Chile	2 – 0	Ecuador
Rivas 10'; Caszely 85'

Estadio Nacional, Santiago, Chile
Attendance: 79,209
Referee: Aristizábal Murcia (Colombia)

21 June 1981

Chile	3 – 0	Paraguay
Caszely 10'; Yáñez 11'; Neira 28'

Estadio Nacional, Santiago, Chile
Attendance: 75,075
Referee: Arppi Filho (Brazil)

Chile qualified.

== Qualified teams ==
The following four teams from CONMEBOL qualified for the final tournament.

Team	Qualified as	Qualified on	Previous appearances in FIFA World Cup^{1}
Argentina	Defending champions	25 June 1978	7 (1930, 1934, 1958, 1962, 1966, 1974, **1978**)
Brazil	Group 1 winners	29 March 1981	11 (1930, 1934, 1938, 1950, 1954, **1958**, **1962**, 1966, **1970**, 1974, 1978)
Peru	Group 2 winners	6 September 1981	3 (1930, 1970, 1978)
Chile	Group 3 winners	21 June 1981	5 (1930, 1950, 1962, 1966, 1974)

^{1} Bold indicates champions for that year. Italic indicates hosts for that year.

== Goalscorers ==
5 goals

- (Brazil) Zico

3 goals

- (Bolivia) Carlos Aragonés
- (Colombia) Hernán Darío Herrera

2 goals

- (Brazil) Sócrates
- (Brazil) Tita
- (Chile) Carlos Caszely
- (Chile) Patricio Yáñez
- (Peru) Guillermo La Rosa
- (Peru) Julio César Uribe
- (Uruguay) Julio Morales
- (Uruguay) Waldemar Victorino

1 goal

- (Bolivia) Miguel Aguilar
- (Bolivia) Jesús Reynardo
- (Brazil) Júnior
- (Brazil) Reinaldo
- (Chile) Miguel Ángel Neira
- (Chile) Carlos Rivas
- (Colombia) Pedro Sarmiento
- (Ecuador) Wilson Nieves
- (Ecuador) Lupo Quiñónez
- (Paraguay) Miguel María Michelagnoli
- (Paraguay) Eugenio Morel
- (Paraguay) Romerito
- (Peru) Gerónimo Barbadillo
- (Uruguay) Rubén Paz
- (Venezuela) Pedro Acosta

== See also ==
- 1982 FIFA World Cup qualification (UEFA)
- 1982 FIFA World Cup qualification (CONCACAF)
- 1982 FIFA World Cup qualification (CAF)
- 1982 FIFA World Cup qualification (AFC and OFC)
