= Abderrazak Belgherbi =

Algerian footballer (born 1961)

Personal information
- Date of birth: 29 October 1961 (age 64)
- Place of birth: Chlef, Algeria
- Position: Defender

Senior career*
Years	Team	Apps	(Gls)
1980-1993	ASO Chlef		
1993–1995	CS Sfaxien		

International career
1987–1989	Algeria	16	(0)
- * Club domestic league appearances and goals

Abderrazak Belgherbi (born 29 October 1961) is an Algerian footballer. He played in 16 matches for the Algeria national football team in 1987 and 1989. He was also named in Algeria's squad for the 1988 African Cup of Nations tournament.
