= Peter Tino =

Tanzanian footballer (born 1956)

Personal information
- Full name: Augustino Peter
- Date of birth: 1956 (age 69–70)
- Place of birth: Kariakoo, Tanganyika Territory
- Position: Forward

Youth career
- 1967–????: Bonde FC
- Young Kinya

Senior career*
Years	Team	Apps	(Gls)
1974–	Urafiki Textile Factory		
- Kiwanda Factory
–1977	Mwatex Textile Factory		
1977–1979	African Sports		
1980–1983	Pan African		
1984–1987	Maji Maji		
1987–1991	Young Africans		

International career
1977–1984	Tanzania	18+	(7+)
- * Club domestic league appearances and goals

Augustino Peter (born 1956), commonly known as Peter Tino, is a Tanzanian former footballer who played as a forward.

== Career ==
Tino began his youth career with Bonde FC in 1967, and later played for Young Kinya in Kariakoo. In 1974, he joined Urafiki Textile Factory in the Tanzanian First League, before later joining Kiwanda Factory and Mwatex Textile Factory in Mwanza. In 1977, he signed for Tanzanian Premier League side African Sports, before joining Pan African in 1980. He joined Maji Maji in 1984, before later signing for Young Africans, where he retired in 1991.

On 26 August 1979, Tino scored the winning goal for the Tanzania national team in a 1980 African Cup of Nations qualification match against Zambia to qualify for the tournament. He was later included in Tanzania's squad for the 1980 African Cup of Nations, where he made three appearances. He later represented Tanzania at the CECAFA Cup in 1981 and 1983, as well as during FIFA World Cup qualification in 1982 and 1986.

== Personal life ==
His brother, Gebo Peter, was also a footballer who played for Sigara and Simba, as well as the Tanzania national team. In 2019, following Tanzania's qualification for the 2019 Africa Cup of Nations, president John Magufuli awarded Tino 5 million Tanzanian shillings and a plot of land in Dar es Salaam for his goal against Zambia in 1979.
