= Germain Milla =

Cameroonian footballer (born 2006)

Personal information
- Full name: Frank Germain Jonathan Miller
- Date of birth: 24 May 2006 (age 20)
- Place of birth: Neuchâtel, Switzerland
- Height: 1.80 m (5 ft 11 in)
- Positions: Right-back; winger

Team information
- Current team: Celta B
- Number: 23

Youth career
- Ferney-Voltaire
- Fursan Hispania
- 2022–2025: Celta

Senior career*
| Years | Team | Apps | (Gls) |
| 2025– | Celta B | 43 | (0) |
| 2026– | Celta | 0 | (0) |

International career
| 2023 | Cameroon U17 | | |
- * Club domestic league appearances and goals as of 7 November 2026

Frank Germain Jonathan Miller (born 24 May 2006), known as Germain Milla, is a professional footballer who plays as either a right-back or a right winger for Segunda División club Celta Fortuna. Born in Switzerland, he represented Cameroon at youth level.

== Club career ==
Born in Neuchâtel, Milla played for the youth sides of Míchel Salgado's Fursan Hispania, before moving to Celta Vigo in October 2022, due to the clubs' partnership agreement. He made his senior debut with the reserves on 17 May 2025, coming on as a late substitute for Tincho Conde in a 2–1 Primera Federación home win over Bilbao Athletic.

On 3 June 2025, Milla signed a four-year contract with Celta, being definitely promoted to the B-team. He featured in 32 matches during the season as the club achieved a first-ever promotion to Segunda División.

Milla made his professional debut on 15 August 2026, starting in a 0–0 away draw against Cádiz CF. He made his first team debut on 13 November, starting and providing the assist to Ferran Jutglà's opener in a 5–0 away routing of Salamanca CF UDS, for the campaign's Copa del Rey.

== International career ==
On 30 November 2023, Milla was called up to the Cameroon national under-17 team.

== Personal life ==
Milla is the son of international footballer Roger Milla, which also earned him the nickname.
