= Ndubuisi Okosieme =

Nigerian footballer (born 1966)

Personal information
- Date of birth: 28 September 1966 (age 60)
- Place of birth: Lagos, Nigeria
- Position: Winger

Senior career*
Years	Team	Apps	(Gls)
1983–1988	Flash Flamingoes		
1988–1989	El-Kanemi Warriors		
1989	ACB Lagos		
1989–1991	KFC Eeklo	23	(4)
- Willesden Constantine
- Petersfield Town

International career
1987–1988	Nigeria		
- * Club domestic league appearances and goals

Ndubuisi Okosieme (born 28 September 1966) is a former Nigerian international football player. He was a skilful right–winger who played professional club football in Nigeria and Belgium, as well as representing the Nigeria national under-20 football team (Flying Eagles) and the senior Nigeria national football team (Green Eagles) in tournament football at international level. He was known by the nickname "Garrincha" during his football career.

== Career ==
As a promising schoolboy player in 1983, Okosieme was disappointed to be rejected by his local club Bendel Insurance for being too small. He signed with Nigerian Rubber Board FC instead, the club who became known as Flash Flamingoes.

During his time with Flash Flamingoes, Okosieme accepted a transfer to New Nigeria Bank FC. The owner of Flash Flamingoes scuppered the transfer by threatening to pull his own funds out of the bank if they signed Okosieme. Disgruntled Okosieme initially refused to return to Flamingoes and wanted to join Julius Berger FC instead, before relenting.

In 1988, Okosieme did leave Flash Flamingoes, for ambitious third division outfit El-Kanemi Warriors who were based in Maiduguri. Leaving after a short time, he briefly played for ACB Lagos. In 1989 Okosieme and compatriot Charles Okonkwo moved to London to play for Brentford but did not break through at the English club. Okonkwo moved to Cyprus while Okosieme finished the season with Belgian Second Division club K.F.C. Eeklo.

At the expiry of his contract with Eeklo in 1991, Okosieme arranged a transfer to SV Eintracht Trier 05 in the Oberliga Südwest, the fourth tier of German football. Okosieme's manager in Belgium blocked the deal, so Okosieme returned to England in the hope of landing a contract there. He was unable to sign for a professional club so spent the years from 1992 to 1995 playing amateur football with Willesden Constantine and Petersfield Town.

In 1995, Okosieme went back to Nigeria and was allowed to join the national team's training camp ahead of their Afro-Asian Cup of Nations match in Uzbekistan that October. He suffered a serious knee injury during the camp but was not compensated by the Nigeria Football Federation (NFF), who said he was there on an unofficial basis.

Okosieme recovered from the injury but was forced to end his playing career after a number of unsuccessful trials with local teams.

== International career ==
Okosieme was part of the Nigeria squad at the 1985 FIFA World Youth Championship, playing the last seven minutes of a 2–0 group stage win over Canada.

In 1987, he was elevated to the senior Nigeria team, playing his part in qualification for the 1988 Seoul Olympics. He was unable to play in the final tournament due to injury. Nigeria were later banned from youth football for two years and stripped of hosting the 1991 FIFA World Youth Championship when FIFA noticed players in the Olympic squad had submitted different birthdates than those provided by the same players at previous FIFA tournaments.

For the 1988 African Cup of Nations, Okosieme remained part of the team and scored in a 3–0 first round win over Kenya. He started the 1–0 defeat to rivals Cameroon in the Final at Stade Mohamed V, Casablanca. It was reported that Okosieme produced a "mesmerising" performance and that Henry Nwosu's headed 'goal' from Okosieme's right–wing cross was controversially ruled out by the referee.

== Personal life ==
Okosieme is part of a football family. His father Cyril Okosieme was a celebrated goalkeeper with Bendel Insurance, Enugu Rangers and the Nigerian national team. Sister Nkiru Okosieme is a former captain of the Nigeria women's national football team (Super Falcons) and played in four editions of the FIFA Women's World Cup from 1991 to 2003.
