= Ali Bouafia =

Algerian footballer (born 1964)

Personal information
- Date of birth: 5 August 1964 (age 62)
- Place of birth: Mulhouse, France
- Height: 1.85 m (6 ft 1 in)
- Position: Midfielder

Senior career*
Years	Team	Apps	(Gls)
1983–1987	Mulhouse	79	(14)
1987–1988	Marseille	12	(1)
1988–1992	Lyon	126	(24)
1992–1995	Strasbourg	92	(13)
1995–1997	Sochaux	56	(6)
1997–1999	Lorient	60	(23)
1999–2000	Créteil	20	(1)
1999–2000	→ Guingamp (loan)	12	(4)

International career
1987–1992	Algeria	7	(0)
- * Club domestic league appearances and goals

Ali Bouafia (born 5 August 1964) is a retired footballer. Born in Mulhouse, France, Bouafia spent his entire club career playing with various clubs in that country. At international level he represented Algeria, and was a member of the squad at the 1992 African Cup of Nations in Senegal.
