= David Ngodiga =

Nigerian footballer

Personal information
- Date of birth: 23 October 1962 (age 64)
- Position: Goalkeeper

International career
Years	Team	Apps	(Gls)
- Nigeria

David Ngodiga (born 23 October 1962) is a Nigerian former footballer. He competed in the men's tournament at the 1988 Summer Olympics.
