= Akie Noah =

Sierra Leonean footballer (1956–2011)

Akie Noah (1956 – May 2011) was a Sierra Leonean footballer who played as a midfielder.

Noah played for Ports Authority F.C. in the late 1970s and early 1980s. He later lived and worked as a coach in California.

He is noted for scoring a goal for the Sierra Leona national team against Algeria in a 1982 World Cup qualifier. In this game, Sierra Leone led 2–0 before Algeria fought back to draw 2–2. Algeria won the second leg 3–1.

Noah died in May 2011.
