= Dahiru Sadi =

Nigerian footballer

Personal information
- Date of birth: 10 December 1963 (age 62)
- Place of birth: Zaria, nigeria
- Position: Midfielder

International career
| Years | Team | Apps | (Gls) |
| 1988 | Nigeria | | |

Dahiru Sadi (born 10 December 1963) is a Nigerian footballer. He competed in the men's tournament at the 1988 Summer Olympics.
