= Sylvanus Okpala =

Nigerian footballer (born 1961)

Personal information
- Full name: Sylvanus Okpala
- Date of birth: 5 September 1961 (age 65)
- Place of birth: Anambra State, Nigeria
- Height: 1.76 m (5 ft 9 1/2 in)
- Position: Midfielder

Senior career*
| Years | Team | Apps | (Gls) |
| 1979-1983 | Enugu Rangers | | |
| 1983–1984 | União | | |
| 1984–1986 | Marítimo | | |
| 1986–1989 | União | | |
| 1989–1991 | Nacional | 39 | (3) |

International career
| 1979–1988 | Nigeria | 45 | (5) |
- * Club domestic league appearances and goals

Sylvanus "Quicksilver" Okpala (born 5 September 1961) is a retired Nigerian football midfielder.

Okpala played club football for Enugu Rangers, C.S. Marítimo and C.D. Nacional in the Portuguese Liga.

Okpala played for the Nigeria national football team at the 1980 and 1988 Summer Olympics. He also played for the squad that won the 1980 African Cup of Nations.

On 8 November 2011, Sylvanus became assistant manager of Nigeria National Team. and was part of the coaching crew that led Nigeria to win the 2013 Africa Cup of Nations (AFCON) title.
