= Chidi Nwanu =

Nigerian footballer

Personal information
- Date of birth: 1 January 1967 (age 59)
- Place of birth: Port Harcourt, Nigeria
- Height: 1.78 m (5 ft 10 in)
- Position: Centre-back

Senior career*
Years	Team	Apps	(Gls)
1983	Enyimba		
1984–1985	Spartans		
1986–1989	ACB Lagos		
1989–1990	Westerlo		
1990–1991	K.T.H. Diest	29	(2)
1991–1993	Beveren	75	(4)
1993–1995	Anderlecht	14	(0)
1995–1996	Sint-Truiden	18	(0)
1996–1997	Anderlecht	2	(0)
1997–1998	RKC Waalwijk	7	(0)

International career
1988–1997	Nigeria	11	(0)
- * Club domestic league appearances and goals

Chidi Nwanu (born 1 January 1967 in Port Harcourt) is a Nigerian former professional footballer who played as a centre-back. He won 11 caps for the Nigeria national team, and was part of the squads for the 1994 FIFA World Cup and the 1988 Summer Olympics.

In 1988, while playing for ACB Lagos, Nwanu was declared unwanted by coach Patrick Ekeji. Nwanu went on to play in lower divisions in Belgium before he was picked up by Jupiler League side KSK Beveren. After three seasons he moved to Anderlecht, who won the league twice during his stay. Nwanu played very few matches; he retired after an unsuccessful spell in RKC Waalwijk.
