= Charles Okonkwo =

Nigerian international footballer

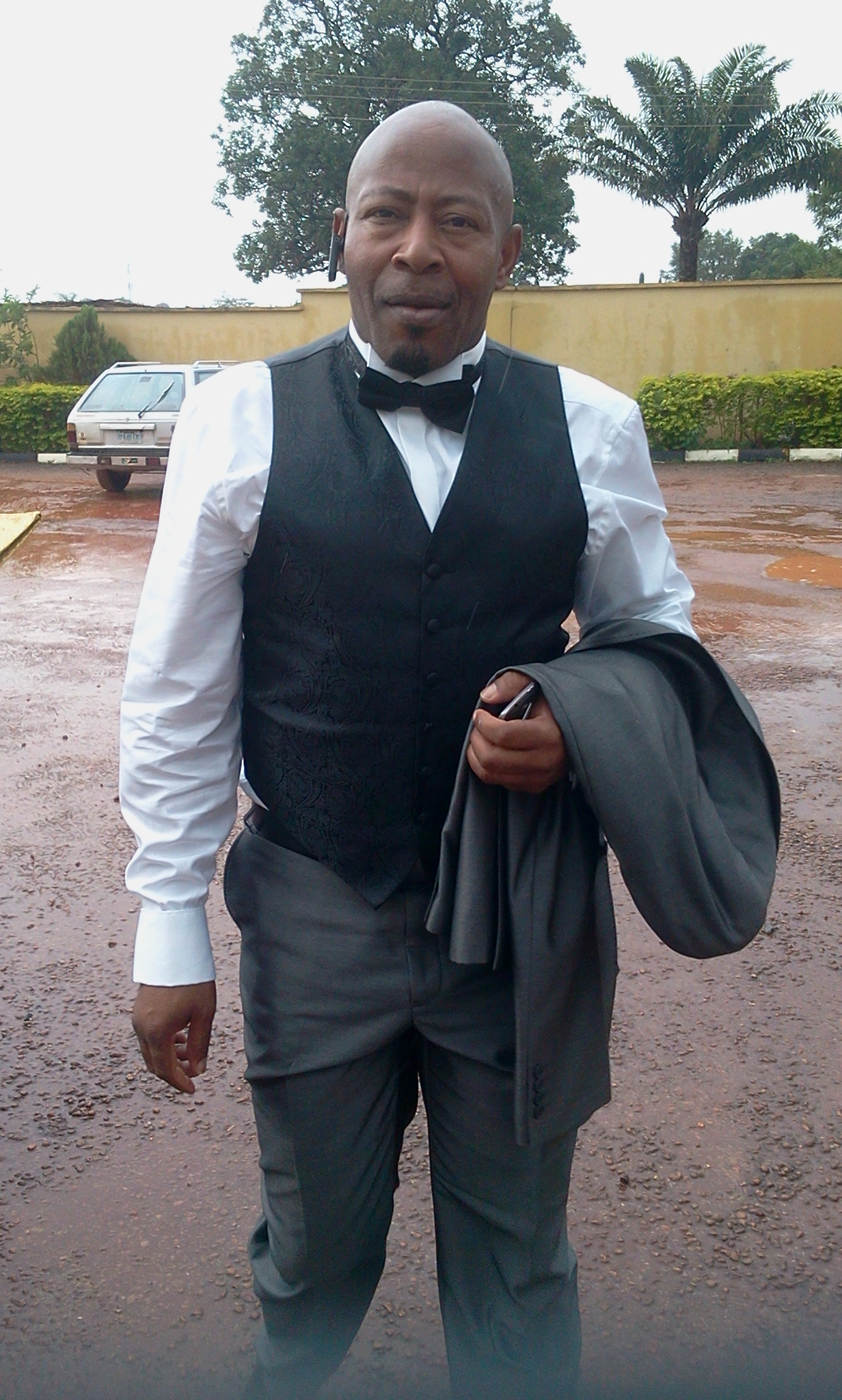

Personal information
- Date of birth: 21 September 1965 (age 61)
- Place of birth: Enugu, Nigeria
- Position: Midfielder

Senior career*
Years	Team	Apps	(Gls)
- Enugu Rangers

International career
1989	Nigeria	1	(0)
- * Club domestic league appearances and goals

Charles Okonkwo (//; born 21 September 1965) is a Nigerian former professional footballer who played as a midfielder.

== Career ==
During his playing career he played for Enugu Rangers in the Nigerian Premier League. He participated in Nigeria's qualification attempt for the 1990 FIFA World Cup.
