= Ismael Dyfan =

Sierra Leonean footballer

Ishmael Dyfan (died 2001), also spelt Ismael or Ishmail, is a Sierra Leonean footballer of the 1970s and 1980s. He played as a midfielder.

Dyfan is regarded as one of the most gifted footballers to be produced by Sierra Leone until recent times. He was one of the first Sierra Leonean footballers to move abroad, playing for Africa Sports (Ivory Coast) and Arab Contractors (Egypt).

For the Sierra Leone national team, he played in the 1978 and 1982 World Cup qualifiers, and scored goals against Nigeria and Algeria.

Dyfan died on 31 January 2001 in the United States, following a sudden illness.
