= 1982 FIFA World Cup qualification =

1982 FIFA World Cup Qualification
Tournament details
- Dates: 26 March 1980 – 10 January 1982
- Teams: 109 (from 6 confederations)

Tournament statistics
- Matches played: 306
- Goals scored: 795 (2.6 per match)
- Top scorer(s): (Australia) Gary Cole (New Zealand) Steve Sumner (New Zealand) Brian Turner (West Germany) Karl-Heinz Rummenigge (9 goals each)

A total of 109 teams entered the 1982 FIFA World Cup qualification rounds, which began with the preliminary qualification draw on 14 October 1979 at Zürich, competing for a total of 24 spots in the final tournament, an increase from 16 in the previous World Cups. Spain, as the hosts, and Argentina, as the defending champions, qualified automatically, leaving 22 spots open for competition.

The 24 spots available in the 1982 World Cup would be distributed among the continental zones as follows:

- Europe (UEFA): 14 places, one to automatic qualifier Spain, while the other 13 places were contested by 33 teams (including Israel).
- South America (CONMEBOL): 4 places, one to automatic qualifier Argentina, while the other 3 places were contested by 9 teams.
- North, Central America and Caribbean (CONCACAF): 2 places, contested by 15 teams.
- Africa (CAF): 2 places, contested by 29 teams.
- Asia and Oceania (AFC and OFC): 2 places, contested by 21 teams.

A total of 103 teams played at least one qualifying match. A total of 306 qualifying matches were played, and 795 goals were scored (an average of 2.60 per match).

This was the last FIFA World Cup qualification that ended in the same year of the tournament until the 2022 FIFA World Cup qualification.

== Qualified teams ==
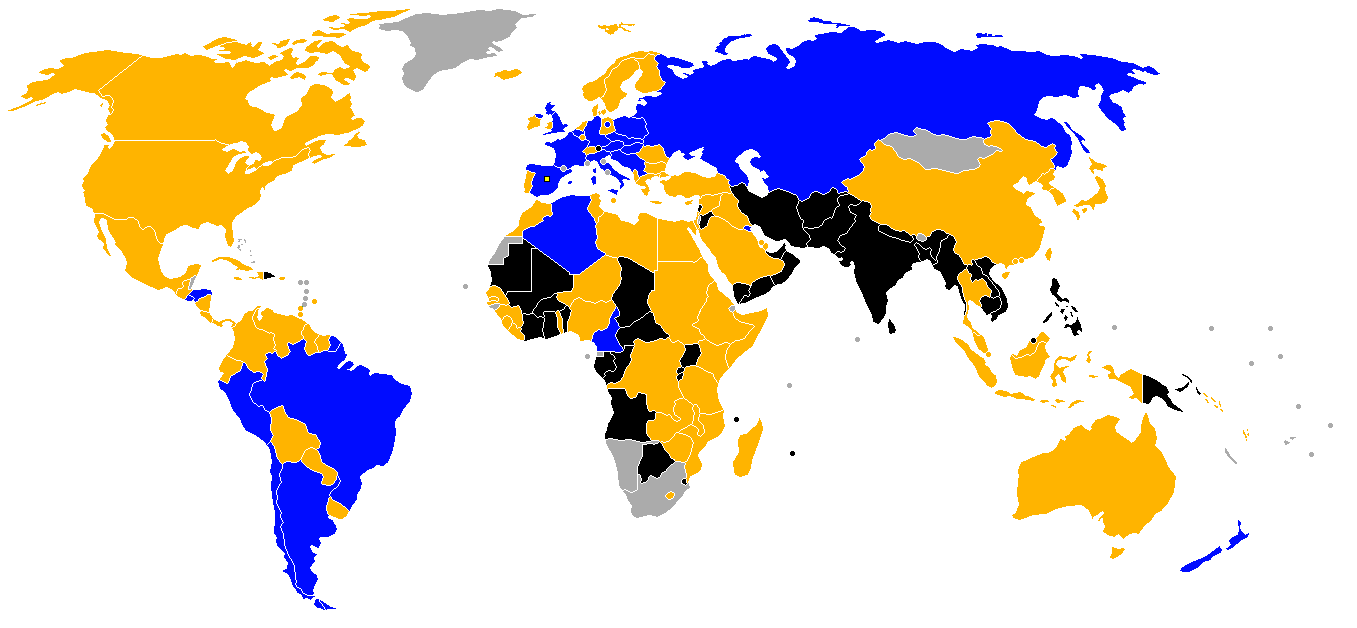
Final qualification status Country qualified for World Cup Country failed to qualify Country did not enter World Cup Country not a FIFA member

The following 24 teams qualified for the 1982 FIFA World Cup:

Team	Method of qualification	Date of qualification	Finals appearance	Last appearance	Consecutive finals appearances	Previous best performance
Spain	Host	6 July 1966	6th	1978	2	Fourth place (1950)
Argentina	1978 FIFA World Cup winners	25 June 1978	8th	1978	3	Winners (1978)
Brazil	CONMEBOL Group 1 winners	22 March 1981	12th	1978	12	Winners (1958, 1962, 1970)
Chile	CONMEBOL Group 3 winners	14 June 1981	6th	1974	1	Third place (1962)
Peru	CONMEBOL Group 2 winners	6 September 1981	4th	1978	2	Quarter-finals (1970), Second round (1978)
Belgium	UEFA Group 2 winners	9 September 1981	6th	1970	1	First round (1930, 1934, 1938, 1954, 1970)
Poland	UEFA Group 7 winners	10 October 1981	4th	1978	3	Third place (1974)
Scotland	UEFA Group 6 winners	14 October 1981	5th	1978	3	First round (1954, 1958, 1974, 1978)
West Germany	UEFA Group 1 winners	14 October 1981	10th	1978	8	Winners (1954, 1974)
Algeria	CAF Final round winners	30 October 1981	1st	—	1	—
Hungary	UEFA Group 4 winners	31 October 1981	8th	1978	2	Runners-up (1938, 1954)
Italy	UEFA Group 5 runners-up	14 November 1981	10th	1978	6	Winners (1934, 1938)
Honduras	1981 CONCACAF Championship champions	16 November 1981	1st	—	1	—
England	UEFA Group 4 runners-up	18 November 1981	7th	1970	1	Winners (1966)
Northern Ireland	UEFA Group 6 runners-up	18 November 1981	2nd	1958	1	Quarter-finals (1958)
Soviet Union	UEFA Group 3 winners	18 November 1981	5th	1970	1	Fourth place (1966)
Yugoslavia	UEFA Group 5 winners	21 November 1981	7th	1974	1	Fourth place (1930, 1962)
Austria	UEFA Group 1 runners-up	22 November 1981	5th	1978	2	Third place (1954)
El Salvador	1981 CONCACAF Championship runners-up	22 November 1981	2nd	1970	1	First round (1970)
Cameroon	CAF Final round winners	29 November 1981	1st	—	1	—
Czechoslovakia	UEFA Group 3 runners-up	29 November 1981	7th	1970	1	Runners-up (1934, 1962)
France	UEFA Group 2 runners-up	5 December 1981	8th	1978	2	Third place (1958)
Kuwait	AFC and OFC Final round winners	14 December 1981	1st	—	1	—
New Zealand	AFC and OFC Final round play-off winners	10 January 1982	1st	—	1	—

== Confederation qualification ==
=== AFC and OFC ===
==== Final Round ====
Pos	Team	Pld	W	D	L	GF	GA	GD	Pts	Qualification
1	Kuwait	6	4	1	1	8	6	+2	9	Final Tournament
2	China	6	3	1	2	9	4	+5	7	Playoff
3	New Zealand	6	2	3	1	11	6	+5	7	Playoff
4	Saudi Arabia	6	0	1	5	4	16	−12	1	

New Zealand beat China 2-1 in the Playoff.

Kuwait and New Zealand qualified.

=== CAF ===
==== Final Round ====
Pos	Team	Pld	W	D	L	GF	GA	GD	Pts	Qualification
1	Algeria	2	2	0	0	4	1	3	4	Final Tournament
2	Nigeria	2	0	0	2	1	4	-3	0	

Pos	Team	Pld	W	D	L	GF	GA	GD	Pts	Qualification
1	Cameroon	2	2	0	0	4	1	3	4	Final Tournament
2	Morocco	2	0	0	2	1	4	-3	0	

Algeria and Cameroon qualified.

=== CONCACAF ===
Pos	Team	Pld	W	D	L	GF	GA	GD	Pts	Qualification
1	Honduras	5	3	2	0	8	1	+7	8	Final Tournament
2	El Salvador	5	2	2	1	2	1	+1	6	Final Tournament
3	Mexico	5	1	3	1	6	3	+3	5	
4	Canada	5	1	3	1	6	6	0	5	
5	Cuba	5	1	2	2	4	8	−4	4	
6	Haiti	5	0	2	3	2	9	−7	2	

Honduras and El Salvador qualified.

=== CONMEBOL ===
==== Group 1 ====
Rank	Team	Pld	W	D	L	GF	GA	GD	Pts	Qualification
1	Brazil	4	4	0	0	11	2	+9	8	Final Tournament
2	Bolivia	4	1	0	3	5	6	−1	2	
3	Venezuela	4	1	0	3	1	9	−8	2	

==== Group 2 ====
Rank	Team	Pld	W	D	L	GF	GA	GD	Pts	Qualification
1	Peru	4	2	2	0	5	2	+3	6	Final Tournament
2	Uruguay	4	1	2	1	5	5	0	4	
3	Colombia	4	0	2	2	4	7	−3	2	

==== Group 3 ====
Rank	Team	Pld	W	D	L	GF	GA	GD	Pts	Qualification
1	Chile	4	3	1	0	6	0	+6	7	Final Tournament
2	Ecuador	4	1	1	2	2	5	−3	3	
3	Paraguay	4	1	0	3	3	6	−3	2	

Group 1 – Brazil qualified.
Group 2 – Peru qualified.
Group 3 – Chile qualified.

=== UEFA ===
==== Group 1 ====
Rank	Team	Pld	W	D	L	GF	GA	GD	Pts	Qualification
1	West Germany	16	8	8	0	0	33	3	+30	Final Tournament
2	Austria	11	8	5	1	2	16	6	+10	Final Tournament
3	Bulgaria	9	8	4	1	3	11	10	+1	
4	Albania	2	8	1	0	7	4	22	−18	
5	Finland	2	8	1	0	7	4	27	−23	

==== Group 2 ====
Rank	Team	Pld	W	D	L	GF	GA	GD	Pts	Qualification
1	Belgium	11	8	5	1	2	12	9	+3	Final Tournament
2	France	10	8	5	0	3	20	8	+12	Final Tournament
3	Republic of Ireland	10	8	4	2	2	17	11	+6	
4	Netherlands	9	8	4	1	3	11	7	+4	
5	Cyprus	0	8	0	0	8	4	29	−25	

==== Group 3 ====
Rank	Team	Pld	W	D	L	GF	GA	GD	Pts	Qualification
1	Soviet Union	14	8	6	2	0	20	2	+18	Final Tournament
2	Czechoslovakia	10	8	4	2	2	15	6	+9	Final Tournament
3	Wales	10	8	4	2	2	12	7	+5	
4	Iceland	6	8	2	2	4	10	21	−11	
5	Turkey	0	8	0	0	8	1	22	−21	

==== Group 4 ====
Rank	Team	Pld	W	D	L	GF	GA	GD	Pts	Qualification
1	Hungary	10	8	4	2	2	13	8	+5	Final Tournament
2	England	9	8	4	1	3	13	8	+5	Final Tournament
3	Romania	8	8	2	4	2	5	5	0	
4	Switzerland	7	8	2	3	3	9	12	−3	
5	Norway	6	8	2	2	4	8	15	−7	

==== Group 5 ====
Rank	Team	Pld	W	D	L	GF	GA	GD	Pts	Qualification
1	Yugoslavia	13	8	6	1	1	22	7	+15	Final Tournament
2	Italy	12	8	5	2	1	12	5	+7	Final Tournament
3	Denmark	8	8	4	0	4	14	11	+3	
4	Greece	7	8	3	1	4	10	13	−3	
5	Luxembourg	0	8	0	0	8	1	23	−22	

==== Group 6 ====
Rank	Team	Pld	W	D	L	GF	GA	GD	Pts	Qualification
1	Scotland	11	8	4	3	1	9	4	+5	Final Tournament
2	Northern Ireland	9	8	3	3	2	6	3	+3	Final Tournament
3	Sweden	8	8	3	2	3	7	8	−1	
4	Portugal	7	8	3	1	4	8	11	−3	
5	Israel	5	8	1	3	4	6	10	−4	

==== Group 7 ====
Rank	Team	Pld	W	D	L	GF	GA	GD	Pts	Qualification
1	Poland	8	4	4	0	0	12	2	+10	Final Tournament
2	East Germany	4	4	2	0	2	9	6	+3	Final Tournament
3	Malta	0	4	0	0	4	2	15	−13	

Group 1 – West Germany and Austria qualified.
Group 2 – Belgium and France qualified.
Group 3 – USSR and Czechoslovakia qualified.
Group 4 – Hungary and England qualified.
Group 5 – Yugoslavia and Italy qualified.
Group 6 – Scotland and Northern Ireland qualified.
Group 7 – Poland qualified.

== Top goalscorers ==
9 goals

- (Australia) Gary Cole
- (New Zealand) Steve Sumner
- (New Zealand) Brian Turner
- (West Germany) Karl-Heinz Rummenigge

8 goals

- (New Zealand) Grant Turner
- (New Zealand) Steve Wooddin

7 goals

- (Mexico) Hugo Sánchez
- (West Germany) Klaus Fischer
- (Socialist Federal Republic of Yugoslavia) Zlatko Vujović

6 goals

- (Cameroon) Roger Milla
- (Denmark) Frank Arnesen

== Notes ==
- The away goals rule was used for the first time as a tie-breaker for two-legged ties. Niger advanced twice by this rule, eliminating Somalia and Togo.
- With the expansion of the final tournament, this marked the first time in which Africa and Asia simultaneously sent representatives to the tournament, with two teams each.
- New Zealand set numerous records on their first successful campaign. They played 15 qualifying matches and travelled 55,000 miles during qualification. Their 13–0 score against Fiji set a World Cup record as did Steve Sumner's six goals in that match. Also during qualifying, goalkeeper Richard Wilson played a World Cup record 921 minutes without conceding a goal.
