= Cheikh M'Baye =

Senegalese footballer

Personal information
- Full name: Cheikh M'Baye
- Date of birth: 14 July 1995 (age 31)
- Place of birth: Saint-Louis, Senegal
- Height: 1.93 m (6 ft 4 in)
- Position: Defender

Youth career
- 2009–2013: Diambars FC

Senior career*
Years	Team	Apps	(Gls)
2014–2015	Bordeaux B	7	(0)
2016	New York Red Bulls II	5	(0)

International career
2014–	Senegal U20		
- * Club domestic league appearances and goals as of 22 April 2016

Cheikh M'Baye (born 14 July 1995) is a Senegalese footballer who plays as a central defender.

== Career ==
=== Club career ===
M'Baye was born in Saint-Louis, Senegal and played for five years at the Diambars-academy. In the summer of 2014 he went on trials in France with Lille and Marseille before signing with FC Girondins de Bordeaux in August 2014 after being discovered by Patrick Battiston. In October 2014, he made his debut for Bordeaux B and went on to make 7 appearances for the club.

In May 2015 it was reported that M'Baye would be joining Auxerre but the move never materialized. On 28 January 2016 it was reported that M'Baye would be joining New York Red Bulls during their pre-season training. After his trial with the first team, M'Baye signed with New York Red Bulls II of the United Soccer League on 8 April 2016. On 17 April M'Baye made his debut for the club as a second half substitute in a scoreless draw against the Rochester Rhinos.

=== International career ===
Cheikh M'Baye has represented Senegal at the U20 level.
