= Osaro Obobaifo =

Nigerian footballer

Personal information
- Date of birth: 1 August 1966
- Date of death: 1991 (aged 24–25)
- Position: Midfielder

International career
Years	Team	Apps	(Gls)
- Nigeria

Osaro Obobaifo (1 August 1966 – 1991) was a Nigerian footballer. He competed in the men's tournament at the 1988 Summer Olympics. He died in a car crash in Belgium.
