= João Batista (footballer, born 1961) =

Brazilian footballer

Personal information
- Full name: João Batista Viana Santos
- Date of birth: 20 July 1961 (age 65)
- Place of birth: Uberlândia, Brazil
- Height: 1.81 m (5 ft 11 in)
- Position: Defender

Senior career*
Years	Team	Apps	(Gls)
1981–1984	Uberlândia		
1985–1990	Atlético–MG	112	(9)
1991	Atlético–PR	23	(1)
1991–1997	Tirsense	157	(11)

International career
1987–1989	Brazil	7	(1)
Medal record
Men's football
Representing Brazil
Olympic Games
Silver medal – second place	1988 Seoul	Team competition
- * Club domestic league appearances and goals

João Batista Viana Santos (born 20 July 1961 in Uberlândia, Brazil), or simply João Batista or Batista, is a Brazilian former professional footballer who played as a defender. He won the silver medal at the 1988 Summer Olympics with Brazil. He played mainly for brazilian side Atlético–MG and Portuguese side Tirsense where he earned 157 caps and 11 goals and won the 1993–94 Portuguese second division.

== Honours ==
Tirsense

- Segunda Divisão de Honra: 1993–94
