= Leotis Boateng =

Nigerian footballer

Personal information
- Date of birth: 8 March 1951 (age 75)

International career
Years	Team	Apps	(Gls)
- Nigeria

Leotis Boateng (born 8 March 1951) is a Nigerian footballer. He competed in the men's tournament at the 1980 Summer Olympics.
