= Christian Obi =

Nigerian footballer (1967–2024)

Personal information
- Date of birth: 2 January 1967
- Date of death: 23 August 2024 (aged 57)
- Place of death: Okigwe, Nigeria
- Position: Goalkeeper

International career
Years	Team	Apps	(Gls)
- Nigeria

Managerial career
- 2022–2023: Heartland

Christian Obi (2 January 1967 – 23 August 2024) was a Nigerian football player and manager. He competed in the men's tournament at the 1988 Summer Olympics. Obi died in a traffic collision in Okigwe, on 23 August 2024, at the age of 57.
