= Seydouba Bangoura =

Guinea football Midfielder

Personal information
- Place of birth: Fria, Guinea
- Date of death: 17 September 2024
- Position: Midfielder

Senior career*
Years	Team	Apps	(Gls)
1970–1983	Hafia		

International career
1980–1983	Guinea	10	(4)
- * Club domestic league appearances and goals

Seydouba Bangoura (died 17 September 2024) was a Guinean footballer who played as a midfielder for the Guinea national football team in the 1980 African Cup of Nations.

Bangoura was a key part of Hafia FC's squad that won the continental championship three times in the 1970s. After his playing career ended, he became a spokesperson for a local bauxite mining business.

== Career statistics ==
=== International ===
Appearances and goals by national team and year
National team	Year	Apps	Goals
Guinea	1980	6	2
Guinea	1981	2	0
Guinea	1982	1	1
Guinea	1983	1	1
Total		10	4

Scores and results list Guinea's goal tally first, score column indicates score after each Bangoura goal

List of international goals scored by Seydouba Bangoura
No.	Date	Venue	Cap	Opponent	Score	Result	Competition
1	16 March 1980	Obafemi Awolowo Stadium, Ibadan, Nigeria	3	Algeria	2–3	2–3	1980 African Cup of Nations
2	21 December 1980	Stade du 28 Septembre, Conakry, Guinea	6	Liberia	1–0	1–0	1982 FIFA World Cup qualification
3	19 February 1982	Estádio da Várzea, Praia, Cape Verde	9	Senegal	2–0	3–0	1982 Amílcar Cabral Cup final
4	23 February 1983	Abidjan, Ivory Coast	10	Ivory Coast	1–2	3–2	Friendly

== Honours ==
Hafia

- Guinée Championnat National: 1966, 1967, 1968, 1971, 1972, 1973, 1974, 1975, 1976, 1977, 1978, 1979, 1982, 1983
- African Cup of Champions Clubs: 1972, 1975, 1977; runner-up 1976, 1978

Guinea

- Amílcar Cabral Cup: 1982
