= Stade Général Eyadema =

Multi-use stadium in Lomé, Togo

Stade Général Eyadema is a multi-use stadium in Lomé, Togo. It is currently used mostly for football matches. The stadium holds 15,000 people, and it was opened in 1968.
