= Wole Odegbami =

Nigerian footballer

Joseph Oluwole "Wole" Odegbami (born 5 October 1962) is a Nigerian former professional footballer who played as a forward. A member of the Nigeria national team, he scored twice in 18 appearances for his country. He is the younger brother of Segun Odegbami, and was a member of the team that competed at the 1988 Summer Olympics in Seoul, South Korea.

Odegbami began his career in Nigeria, playing for Leventis United of Ibadan, before later playing for JIB Rock Strikers of Jos and Iwuanyanwu Nationale of Owerri. He played for four seasons in Cyprus, for EPA Larnaca and Paralimni, and then moved on in 1993 to VSE St. Pölten in the Austrian Bundesliga. In the 1994–95 season, he had trials in England with Millwall and Wimbledon, but was not offered a contract.

Odegbami also played for English non-League sides, Dulwich Hamlet, Bromley, Grays Athletic and Purfleet.
