= Samuel Okwaraji =

Nigerian footballer

Personal information
- Full name: Samuel Sochukwuma Okwaraji
- Date of birth: 19 May 1964
- Place of birth: Orlu, Nigeria
- Date of death: 12 August 1989 (aged 25)
- Place of death: Lagos, Nigeria
- Position: Midfielder

Youth career
- 1984–1985: AS Roma

Senior career*
Years	Team	Apps	(Gls)
1985–1986	Dinamo Zagreb	1	(0)
1986–1987	Austria Klagenfurt	14	(0)
1987–1989	VfB Stuttgart	0	(0)
1987–1988	→ SSV Ulm (loan)	28	(5)
1989	K. Berchem Sport		

International career
1988	Nigeria Olympic	4	(0)
1988–1989	Nigeria	8	(1)
- * Club domestic league appearances and goals

Samuel Sochukwuma Okwaraji // (19 May 1964 – 12 August 1989) was a professional footballer who played internationally for Nigeria. He was a qualified lawyer who had a masters in international law from the Pontifical Lateran University of Rome. He collapsed and died of congestive heart failure in the 77th minute of a World Cup qualification match against Angola at the Lagos National Stadium in Surulere, Lagos State on 12 August 1989.

== Career ==
Okwaraji left Nigeria in 1982 to study international law in Italy (Rome). It is there that the Italian first division side, AS Roma (1984–1985), signed him at the age of 20. As an unknown player, it was difficult to force a breakthrough at the mighty Rome, so he moved to Dinamo Zagreb (1985–1986) in Yugoslavia, and then on to Klagenfurt (1986–1987) in Austria. At both clubs, he struggled to get sufficient game time to further his development. He was a tricky dribbler, with a knack for the incisive creativity that all teams crave.

It was at Klagenfurt that German Stuttgart (1987–1989) signed him. Okwaraji was one of the first African football players in Germany signing a professional contract. Not long into the contract, he was loaned to a second division SSV-ULM 1848 (1985–1986). He blossomed at ULM to point that the club did not play without him. “No Okwaraji, no ULM” was the popular slogan then.

After one season with ULM, he returned to Stuttgart (1987–1988). After that season he signed with Belgian side K. Berchem Sport (1988–1989) on the 1st of July 1988. One year later, on 12 August, he died during a world cup qualification game against Angola, at the age of 25.

== International career ==
Okwaraji aspired to become Nigeria's Michel Platini and Brazilian Falcao who were both his soccer role models. At FC ULM he played regularly. It was at that time that he started writing letters to the Nigerian Football Association urging them to try him. None were answered until the Nigeria Football Association chairman, John Obakpolor, agreed with the coaches Manfred Höner and Paul Hamilton to bring him into the training camp when the Nigerian national team was on a tour in West Germany.

He started training with the national team on Monday, 5 days later (Saturday) he was in the starting eleven against Algeria for an Olympic qualifier, and was the subject of favourable newspaper reports. He later started in all of Nigeria's matches.

He went on to play for the national team at the 1988 Africa Cup of Nations in Morocco, playing a key role throughout Nigeria's run to the final. He scored one of the fastest goals in the history of the championship against the Indomitable Lions of Cameroon.

He played until the final match, where the Eagles lost to their perennial rivals Cameroon by 0 to 1. Okwaraji, who made the Green Eagles squad in 1988 at the African Nations Cup in Morocco, scored one of the fastest goals in the history of African football against Nigeria's perennial rivals, the Indomitable Lions of Cameroon, and was twice named man of the match.

He also went to the 1988 Olympics in Seoul, though Nigeria disappointed. Okwaraji remained central to the squad as it began the process of building towards their ultimate aim of a place at the 1990 World Cup. He was a key player as the campaign drew towards its conclusion and that fateful match with Angola.

== Last game and death ==
Okwaraji collapsed ten minutes from the end of the 1990 World Cup qualifier against Angola in Lagos. He died from possible complications of hypertrophic cardiomyopathy as an autopsy showed that the 25-year-old had an enlarged heart and high blood pressure.

== Legacy ==
Okwaraji started playing for the national team of Nigeria where he became a key player after his first game. Despite the poor game time at club levels AS Roma, Dinamo Zagreb and Klagenfurt; he kept searching for football clubs urging them to give him a trial. He was signed by Stuttgart, and then was loaned to SSV-ULM.

Okwaraji appeared for the national team for only one year, making eight international appearances, yet he became regarded for his energetic and disciplined style of play. Known for his professionalism, he reportedly covered his own travel expenses when called up for national duty. He consistently prioritized representing Nigeria, even when doing so created challenges for his club commitments.

When Okwaraji started playing for the national team, the Nigerian Football Association asked permission from SSV-ULM 1846, which his club was only willing to accept after having been paid a sum of $45,000. After negotiations the amount came down to $15,000. Okwaraji, a master's degree holder in law, was very upset when hearing this and made it very clear to his club with the following words:

"You cannot stop me playing for my country and let me tell you, I am going to represent my country in the World Cup in Italy whether you like it or not".

Okwaraji's passion for the game, his work on the pitch and his attitude turned him into an example for everyone who is passionate about football and in general.

20 years after his death, as an act of honour and remembrance, the Nigerian government set up a statue of Okwaraji in front of the stadium where he died. On 19 May 2019, on what would have been his 55th birthday, he was honoured with a Google Doodle. In 2024 a national football tournament will be launched in name of him. The Sam Okwaraji Memorial Football Competition is a project financed by the government with the aim to discover promising Nigerian football talents.

== Family ==
Okwaraji was born and raised in a family of 7 children. His father, David Okwaraji, died when he was in primary school. Sam Okwaraji's nephew, Sam, who was named after his uncle caught the eye of Nigerian football association which led to his eligibility for Nigerian national team U23 in 2021.

== Honours ==
Nigeria

- African Cup of Nations: 1988

== See also ==
- List of association footballers who died while playing

== External sources ==
- Samuel Okwaraji at National-Football-Teams.com
- Samuel Okwaraji at Playerhistory
