= Mamane Ali =

Nigerien footballer

Atcha
Personal information
- Full name: Mamane Ali

Senior career*
Years	Team	Apps	(Gls)
- Zumunta AC

International career
- Niger
- * Club domestic league appearances and goals

Mamane Ali nicknamed Atcha is a Nigerien former international footballer of the 1970s and 1980s. He played for Zumunta AC.
