= Andrew Uwe =

Nigerian footballer

Personal information
- Date of birth: 10 August 1963 (age 63)
- Position: Defender

Senior career*
Years	Team	Apps	(Gls)
1985-1986	Leventis United		
1987-1989	Heartland FC		
1989-1993	KSV Roeselare		
1994-1995	SV Wehen		
1995-1998	VfB Oldenburg		
1998-1999	LR Ahlen		
1999-2000	BV Cloppenburg		
2000-2001	VfB Oldenburg		
2001	Houston Dynamo		

International career
- Nigeria
- * Club domestic league appearances and goals

Andrew Uwe (born 10 August 1963) is a Nigerian former footballer who competed in the men's tournament at the 1988 Summer Olympics.
