= Roger Milla =

Cameroonian footballer (born 1952)

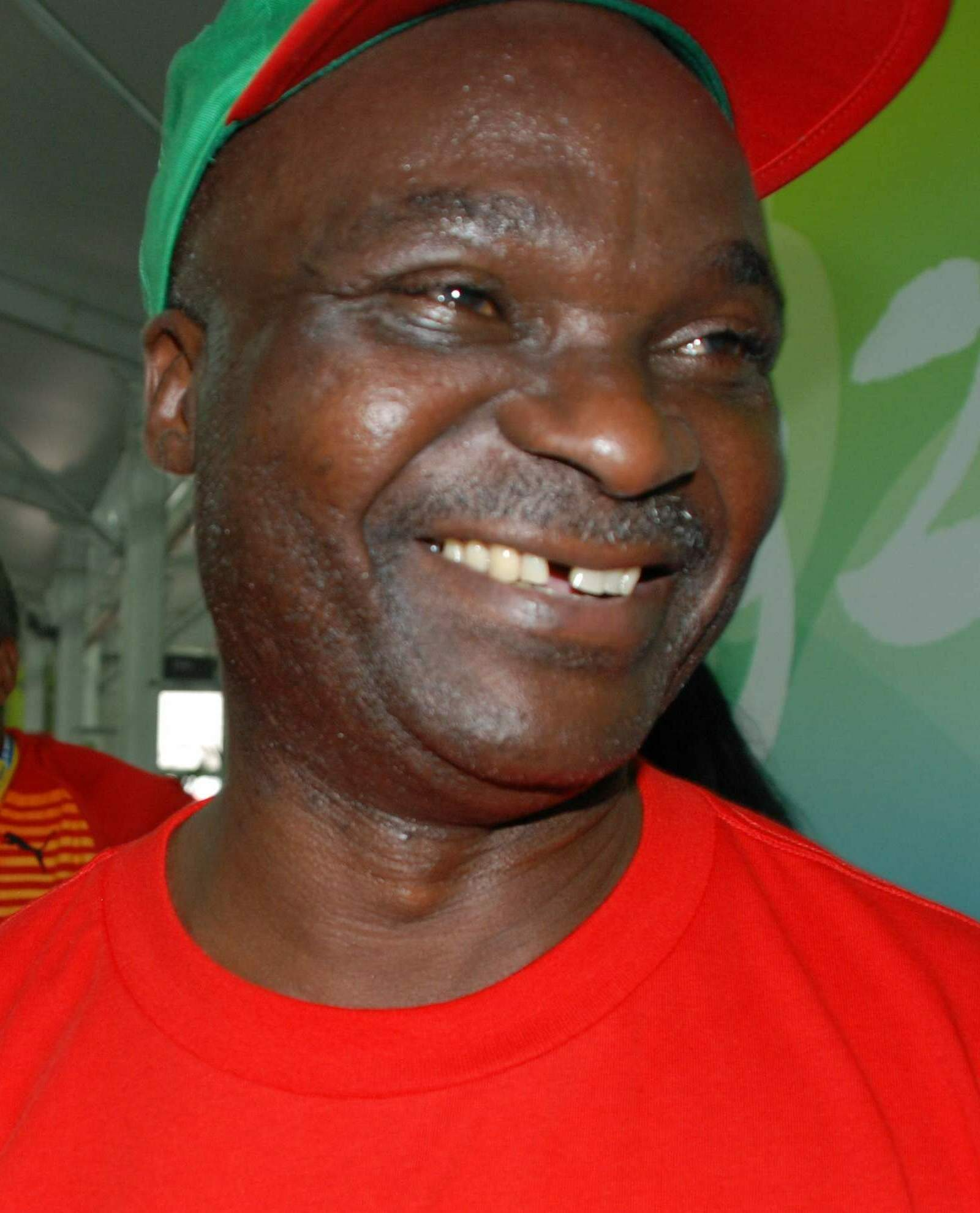
- Milla in 2008

Personal information
- Full name: Albert Roger Miller
- Date of birth: 20 May 1952 (age 74)
- Place of birth: Yaoundé, Cameroon
- Height: 1.76 m (5 ft 9 in)
- Position: Forward

Youth career
- 1965–1967: Éclair de Douala

Senior career*
Years	Team	Apps	(Gls)
1967–1970	Éclair de Douala	57	(6)
1970–1974	Léopard Douala	116	(89)
1974–1977	Tonnerre	87	(69)
1977–1979	Valenciennes	28	(6)
1979–1980	Monaco	17	(2)
1980–1984	Bastia	113	(35)
1984–1986	Saint-Étienne	59	(31)
1986–1989	Montpellier	95	(37)
1989–1990	Saint-Pierroise	23	(8)
1990–1994	Tonnerre	116	(89)
1994–1995	Pelita Jaya	23	(23)
1995–1996	Putra Samarinda	12	(18)
Total		747	(416)

International career
1973–1994	Cameroon	77	(43)

Managerial career
- 2001–2007: Montpellier (coaching staff)
- 2007–2011: Tonnerre
- 2011–2012: Tonnerre (director of football)
Medal record
Men's football
Representing Cameroon
Africa Cup of Nations
Winner	1984 Ivory Coast
Winner	1988 Morocco
Runner-up	1986 Egypt
Afro-Asian Cup of Nations
Winner	1985 Cameroon
- * Club domestic league appearances and goals

Albert Roger Miller (born 20 May 1952), known as Roger Milla, is a Cameroonian former professional footballer who played as a forward. Described by FIFA as "one of the first global stars from Africa", Milla represented Cameroon at three FIFA World Cup tournaments.

He achieved international stardom at 38 years old, an age at which most forwards have retired, by scoring four goals at the 1990 FIFA World Cup, becoming the oldest goalscorer in World Cup history at the time. He helped Cameroon become the first African team to reach the World Cup quarter-finals. Four years later, at the age of 42, Milla broke his own record as the oldest goalscorer in World Cup history by scoring against Russia in the 1994 FIFA World Cup.

Milla frequently celebrated goals by running to the corner flag and performing a dance similar to the lambada. In 2004 he was named by Pelé in the FIFA 100 list of the world's greatest living players. In 2007, the Confederation of African Football named Milla the best African player of the previous 50 years. At the time of his retirement, he was regarded as the all-time topscorer from African region in FIFA World Cup finals with five goals and his record was eventually surpassed by Ghana's Asamoah Gyan.

== Biography ==
His birth certificate as well as his passport implies his name as Roger Miller due to a clerical error and misunderstanding. His parents wanted to give him the surname of his uncle 'Milla' by the time he was born. He was often referred to as Miller whenever he featured in high-profile international matches, with World Cup statistical sheets incorrectly referring to him as Miller, demonstrating how much his name had been mispronounced and incorrectly heard in international community. His family moved to Douala when he was 11.

His father worked on the railroads and Milla had the fortune of travelling all over the nation on many occasions in his childhood. He was raised up in the streets of Yaoundé and he hailed from a typical middle-class family so that his parents were able to provide him a satisfactory education. However, his parents were unhappy when they noticed that Milla was going after football and they were initially reluctant to accept their son playing the sport of football.

He learnt the art of playing football by playing barefoot with fellow kids on dirt streets and roads and in most of the occasions he played with an orange or a tin can as an alternative option for a ball. He also had the habit of kicking lemons and rags tied together into balls. He along with other children had to play in dusty courts since Cameroon had not yet established children soccer academies at that time and Cameroon did not have the luxury of well maintained fields nor did they afford to have licensed coaches. It was revealed that Milla played football solely for leisure, fun and entertainment purposes and did not think seriously of making it as his career and he went onto polish his football skills during school vacations.

Roger Milla himself said that he had finished high school but his claim has been refuted by some Cameroonian writers. He has three brothers with different surnames, being Joseph Debouba, Jacques Edjanque and Alexandre Diboussi. He nearly quit the sport after his mother's untimely death at home, during a time when he played soccer in a distant arena. Additionally, his wife had become pregnant as the couple awaited their second child.

== Club career ==
=== Early years ===
He played for Éclair de Douala's junior team at the age of 13 and engaged exclusively in school tournaments. He later convinced his parents following his impressive performances in age group category matches.

He made his debut for Éclair de Douala's senior team in the second division of the Cameroonian championship at the age of 15. Two years later, aged 17, he became the Cameroonian schools high jump champion. He signed up for the top division club Léopard Douala in 1970 at the age of 18 and eventually went onto win three Cameroonian championship titles with the club. He also scored a tally of 89 goals in 116 appearances for Léopard Douala during a tenure of four years. He subsequently moved to Tonnerre Yaoundé in 1974 four years after the successful stint with Léopard Douala. He won the African Cup Winners' Cup with Tonnerre Yaoundé and for Tonnerre Yaoundé club he scored 69 goals in 87 games.

=== Moving to France ===
He moved to France at the age of 25 in 1977 where he spent 12 years of his career playing for various clubs. In 1977, he was lured to Europe by the French club Valenciennes. There he scored 6 goals in 28 league games over two seasons. In 1979, he joined AS Monaco, where he won the 1980 French Cup and scored 5 goals in 25 league and cup games. He had endured multiple injury concerns during his short stay and his team management decided to release him at the end of the season. The next year, he joined Bastia, where he spent four seasons. Milla scored 42 goals in 133 competitive matches and was instrumental in assisting the club to win the 1981 French Cup.

He next moved to Saint-Etienne in 1984 and became a crucial member of the club, which was recovering from the aftermath of a massive bribery scandal in 1982 and the subsequent relegation to Division 2, having had to sell out most of its first-choice players. He overall played 69 matches for the club scoring 36 goals and played a part in helping the club to re-enter the first division. He then starred for Montpellier from 1986 to 1989, where Milla later went on to become a member of the club's coaching staff after retiring from French football. In his first season, Milla scored 18 goals in 33 regular season matches, which ultimately helped the Montpellier to return to Division 1. Overall, he scored 41 goals in 103 appearances for the Montpellier.

=== Later years ===
Milla left French football at the age of 37 in 1989 and moved to Réunion in the Indian Ocean where he played for JS Saint-Pierroise. After his World Cup success, he returned to Tonnerre in Cameroon for four seasons. He closed out his playing days with two clubs in Indonesia after the 1994 World Cup, retiring from the sport at the end of the 1996 season. The number of goals he had scored in the Indonesian local championship surpassed the number of matches he had even played in the competition, with 41 goals coming in just 35 matches over a period of two years.

== International career ==
Milla was capped 77 times for the national team, scoring 43 goals. Milla made his first appearance for Cameroon in 1973 versus Zaire in a World Cup qualifier.

He made his World Cup debut in also what is considered to be the maiden World Cup appearance for Cameroon when they qualified for the 1982 FIFA World Cup after winning both their final round matches against Morocco at the 1982 FIFA World Cup qualification for the African Zone. Milla played an instrumental role in helping Cameroon to qualify for the 1982 World Cup by top scoring in the 1982 FIFA World Cup qualification for the African Zone competition. He endured mixed emotions at 1982 FIFA World Cup having a goal disallowed against Peru in their first match. Cameroon went out with three draws from their three first-round games. Two years later, he was part of the squad competing at the 1984 Summer Olympics in Los Angeles, California.

Milla was also an integral member of the Cameroonian squad which won the 1984 African Cup of Nations where Cameroon defeated Nigeria 3-1 in the final to secure Cameroon's first ever continental title. He was a key member of the Cameroonian side which emerged as runners-up to Egypt in the final of the 1986 African Cup of Nations and he received the best player award in the tournament for being the top goal scorer with 4. He was also named in 1986 African Cup of Nations team of the tournament. He was also the joint top goalscorer in the 1988 African Cup of Nations with 2 goals alongside Algeria's Lakhdar Belloumi, Abdoulaye Traoré of Ivory Coast and Gamal Abdelhamid of Egypt. He once again played a vital role in Cameroon's triumph at the 1988 African Cup of Nations and for his noteworthy performances throughout the tournament, he was adjudged as the player of the tournament and was also included in the 1988 African Cup of Nations team of the tournament.

In 1988, at the age of 36, Milla celebrated his early retirement from international football with a jubilee in Cameroon. However, in 1990, he received a phone call from the President of Cameroon Paul Biya, who pleaded with him to come out of international retirement and rejoin the national team. He agreed, and went to Italy with the Indomitable Lions for the 1990 World Cup, where he would cause a sensation. It was revealed that Paul Biya wanted Milla to play in the World Cup after watching Milla play in an exhibition charity match which was played at Douala where Milla went on to score two goals. Following the insistence of the Cameroonian President, Milla decided to make a comeback to international football by making an official announcement in May 1990.

It is also reported that most of the Cameroonian teammates and the national head coach Valery Nepomnyashchy who is a Russian did not want Milla to be part of the 1990 FIFA World Cup. Biya issued a decree summoning him to return to the national side and Biya officially signed the decree requesting and compelling the coach to pick him for the World Cup squad. It was also reported that the renowned sportswriters in Cameroon along with fans began a campaign to recall Milla back to the national team following Cameroon's embarrassing display during the 1990 African Cup of Nations in Algeria where Cameroon crashed out from the group stage with defeats to The Gambia and Senegal.

=== 1990 World Cup ===
Milla scored all his four goals in the tournament as a substitute as he started every game of the tournament on the bench. He started in the second half in four out of five World Cup matches and appeared in the first half once. His two crucial goals came in the second half of the match against Romania within just two minutes in extra time where he once again appeared as a substitute and following his heroics, he was hailed as a hero in Cameroon. It was the coach Valery Nepomnyashchy who decided to bring in Milla a bit earlier in the game against Romania knowing full well that a victory would secure Cameroon's spot in the knockout stages and the coach later acknowledged the importance of Milla after his important late cameo in Cameroon's remarkable upset victory over defending world champions Argentina. He was the oldest outfield player to feature in the 1990 FIFA World Cup and was the second oldest player during the tournament after England's Peter Shilton.

The 38-year-old Milla emerged as one of the tournament's major stars. He scored four goals in Italy, celebrating each one with a dance around the corner flag that has become a popular goal celebration ever since. Two of his goals came against Romania in Cameroon's second game, and two more came in extra time against Colombia in the last 16 to carry Cameroon to the quarter-finals, the furthest an African team had ever advanced at the World Cup (Senegal and Ghana matched this feat in 2002 and 2010 respectively, whilst Morocco surpassed it by reaching the semi-finals in 2022). In the quarter-final match against England, Milla confirmed his super-sub legend by entering in the second half with Cameroon trailing 1–0 and drawing a penalty and then setting up a goal for Ekeke to give Cameroon a 2–1 lead, before England later scored two penalties, to win 3–2 after extra time. Due to his performances in Italy, he was once again named African Footballer of the Year.

His second goal celebration against Colombia became iconic across the world, and was used by Coca-Cola as seen in ads like the 2010 World Cup Coca-Cola advertisement.

=== 1994 World Cup ===
Milla returned to the 1994 FIFA World Cup at the age of 42, being the oldest player ever to appear in a World Cup until the 2014 tournament when Colombia's Faryd Mondragón entered in a group stage match versus Japan when 43 years and 3 days old. Mondragon's record in turn was beaten by Essam El Hadary in 2018. Cameroon were knocked out in the group stages; however, Milla scored a goal against Russia, setting a record as the oldest goalscorer in a World Cup tournament, breaking the record he had set in 1990. His final international appearance came in a friendly against South Africa in December 1994.

== Style of play ==
Primarily a centre-forward, Milla was known for his combination of physical strength, technique, dribbling ability and direct running. He was particularly effective at carrying the ball towards goal, while his close control and ability to beat defenders made him a dangerous attacking presence. During his time at Montpellier, he became popular with supporters for his skilful dribbling and powerful attacking runs.

As he grew older and lost some of his pace, Milla increasingly relied on his positioning, experience and anticipation to remain effective. Former Cameroon teammate Rigobert Song recalled that Milla did not need to cover large distances to influence matches because of his exceptional positional sense, while his experience and maturity enabled him to make decisive contributions. His awareness was also evident at the 1990 FIFA World Cup, when he anticipated René Higuita's tendency to dribble outside his penalty area and dispossessed the Colombian goalkeeper before scoring in Cameroon's round-of-16 victory. Even late in his career, his technique, strength and intelligent movement allowed him to remain a potent goalscoring threat.

== Post-playing career ==
He is now an itinerant ambassador for African causes. He also works as a volunteer for various groups including the World Wide Fund for Nature. He also opened two companies for recycling plastic into paving slabs. In 2004, he was named to the FIFA 100, a list of the 125 greatest living footballers selected by Pelé in conjunction with FIFA's centenary celebrations.

He coached Montpellier from 2001 to 2007. He also went onto serve as the manager of the Tonnerre for a tenure of four years between 2007 and 2011.

== Personal life ==
Milla's son Germain Milla is also a footballer.

== Legacy ==
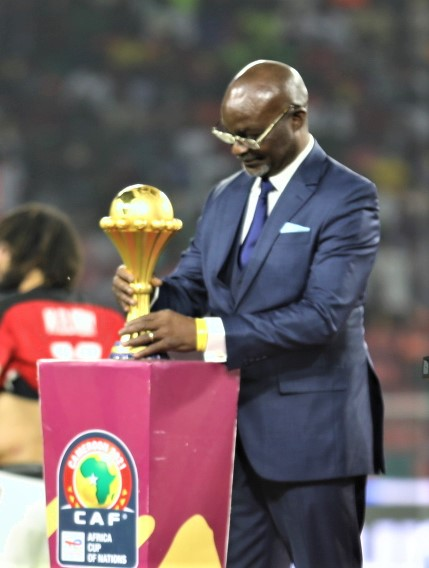
Milla with the Africa Cup of nations trophy in 2022.

He was appointed as honorary president of the Cameroonian Football Federation in March 2008. However, he was removed from the position as honorary president in May 2012 after criticising top officials of the Cameroon Football Federation regarding the lengthy ban imposed on Samuel Eto'o.

On 24 November 2022, he was honoured by the FIFA for his achievements as the FIFA President Gianni Infantino presented him a plaque just prior to the start of the group stage match between Cameroon and Switzerland during the 2022 FIFA World Cup at Al Janoub Stadium and Milla was also officially invited as a special guest by FIFA President to watch the match.

His wily celebration in a kind of Makossa dance at corner flag area during the 1990 FIFA World Cup changed the perceptions of how people started to see African football in a positive manner. His celebrations were deemed as instant hit and triggered positive energy to the viewers during the World Cup. He became the talk of the town and tournament sensation during the 1990 FIFA World Cup mainly for his skill sets on the field, dance celebrations and for his technique. He was later dubbed as "King of the Corner Flag".

In 2020, he along with his Cameroonian teammates received three bedroom bungalows as gifts in recognition of their stellar run during the 1990 FIFA World Cup. However, they had to wait for 30 years to receive the gift despite an early promise by President Paul Biya in 1990. The project was long delayed following the concerns regarding corruption and malpractice in regards to the submitted list of 44 beneficiaries.

== Career statistics ==
=== Club ===
Appearances and goals by club, season and competition
Club	Season	League			Cup		Total	
Club	Season	Division	Apps	Goals	Apps	Goals	Apps	Goals
Eclair de Douala	1968–69	Première Division	28	1				
Eclair de Douala	1969–70	Première Division	29	5				
Eclair de Douala	Total		57	6				
Léopard Douala	1970–71	Première Division	29	25				
Léopard Douala	1971–72	Première Division	30	20				
Léopard Douala	1972–73	Première Division	28	19				
Léopard Douala	1973–74	Première Division	30	25				
Léopard Douala	Total		117	89				
Tonnerre Yaoundé	1974–75	Première Division	29	23				
Tonnerre Yaoundé	1975–76	Première Division	28	26				
Tonnerre Yaoundé	1976–77	Première Division	30	20				
Tonnerre Yaoundé	Total		87	69				
Valenciennes	1977–78	Division 1	0	0				
Valenciennes	1978–79	Division 1	28	6	1	1		
Valenciennes	Total		28	6	1	1		
Monaco	1979–80	Division 1	17	2	8	3		
Bastia	1980–81	Division 1	30	9	9	8		
Bastia	1981–82	Division 1	23	8	6	3		
Bastia	1982–83	Division 1	29	13	2	0		
Bastia	1983–84	Division 1	31	5	3	1		
Bastia	Total		113	30	20	12		
Saint-Étienne	1984–85	Division 2	31	22	8	3		
Saint-Étienne	1985–86	Division 2	28	9	2	2		
Saint-Étienne	Total		59	31	10	5		
Montpellier	1986–87	Division 2	33	18	2	1		
Montpellier	1987–88	Division 1	33	12	4	3		
Montpellier	1988–89	Division 1	29	7	2	0		
Montpellier	Total		95	37	8	4		
Saint-Pierroise	1989							
Saint-Pierroise	1990	D1 Pro	23	8				
Saint-Pierroise	Total		23	8				
Tonnerre Yaoundé	1990–91	Première Division	29	22				
Tonnerre Yaoundé	1991–92	Première Division	30	19				
Tonnerre Yaoundé	1992–93	Première Division	27	23				
Tonnerre Yaoundé	1993–94	Première Division	30	25				
Tonnerre Yaoundé	Total		116	89				
Pelita Jaya	1994–95	Premier Division	23	23				
Putra Samarinda	1995–96	Premier Division	12	18				
Career total			747	413	47	25	794	438

=== International ===
Appearances and goals by national team and year
National team	Year	Apps	Goals
Cameroon	1973	3	0
Cameroon	1975	3	1
Cameroon	1976	8	7
Cameroon	1977	6	4
Cameroon	1978	1	0
Cameroon	1979	2	3
Cameroon	1980	1	1
Cameroon	1981	7	9
Cameroon	1982	6	0
Cameroon	1984	8	2
Cameroon	1985	2	2
Cameroon	1986	5	4
Cameroon	1987	4	3
Cameroon	1988	5	2
Cameroon	1990	5	4
Cameroon	1991	1	0
Cameroon	1992	5	0
Cameroon	1994	5	1
Total		77	43

Scores and results list Cameroon's goal tally first, score column indicates score after each Milla goal.

List of international goals scored by Roger Milla
No.	Date	Venue	Opponent	Score	Result	Competition	Ref.
1	19 November 1975	Ahmadou Ahidjo Stadium, Yaoundé, Cameroon	Zaire	—	2–1	Friendly	
2	7 July 1976	Stade d'Angondjé, Libreville, Gabon	Rwanda	5–0	5–0	1976 Central African Games	
3	10 July 1976	Stade d'Angondjé, Libreville, Gabon	Burundi	—	5–0	1976 Central African Games	
4	10 July 1976	Stade d'Angondjé, Libreville, Gabon	Burundi	—	5–0	1976 Central African Games	
5	14 July 1976	Stade d'Angondjé, Libreville, Gabon	Congo	—	3–2	1976 Central African Games	
6	14 July 1976	Stade d'Angondjé, Libreville, Gabon	Congo	3–2	3–2	1976 Central African Games	
7	17 October 1976	Stade de la Revolution, Brazzaville, Congo	Congo	1–0	2–2	1978 FIFA World Cup qualification	
8	31 October 1976	Ahmadou Ahidjo Stadium, Yaoundé, Cameroon	Congo	1–0	1–2	1978 FIFA World Cup qualification	
9	26 January 1977	Ahmadou Ahidjo Stadium, Yaoundé, Cameroon	Congo	—	2–2	Friendly	
10	13 March 1977	Ahmadou Ahidjo Stadium, Yaoundé, Cameroon	Congo	2–0	2–0	1978 African Cup of Nations qualification	
11	27 December 1977	Ahmadou Ahidjo Stadium, Yaoundé, Cameroon	Rwanda	—	4–0	1978 All-Africa Games qualification	
12	27 December 1977	Ahmadou Ahidjo Stadium, Yaoundé, Cameroon	Rwanda	—	4–0	1978 All-Africa Games qualification	
13	10 April 1979	Ahmadou Ahidjo Stadium, Yaoundé, Cameroon	Guinea	1–0	3–0	1980 African Cup of Nations qualification	
14	10 April 1979	Ahmadou Ahidjo Stadium, Yaoundé, Cameroon	Guinea	2–0	3–0	1980 African Cup of Nations qualification	
15	10 April 1979	Ahmadou Ahidjo Stadium, Yaoundé, Cameroon	Guinea	3–0	3–0	1980 African Cup of Nations qualification	
16	29 June 1980	Ahmadou Ahidjo Stadium, Yaoundé, Cameroon	Malawi	1–0	3–0	1982 FIFA World Cup qualification	
17	5 April 1981	Reunification Stadium, Douala, Cameroon	Togo	1–0	4–0	1982 African Cup of Nations qualification	
18	5 April 1981	Reunification Stadium, Douala, Cameroon	Togo	3–0	4–0	1982 African Cup of Nations qualification	
19	5 April 1981	Reunification Stadium, Douala, Cameroon	Togo	4–0	4–0	1982 African Cup of Nations qualification	
20	26 April 1981	Reunification Stadium, Douala, Cameroon	Zaire	1–0	6–1	1982 FIFA World Cup qualification	
21	26 April 1981	Reunification Stadium, Douala, Cameroon	Zaire	3–0	6–1	1982 FIFA World Cup qualification	
22	26 April 1981	Reunification Stadium, Douala, Cameroon	Zaire	6–1	6–1	1982 FIFA World Cup qualification	
23	16 August 1981	Ahmadou Ahidjo Stadium, Yaoundé, Cameroon	Madagascar	5–1	5–1	1982 African Cup of Nations qualification	
24	15 November 1981	Kenitra Municipal Stadium, Kenitra, Morocco	Morocco	1–0	2–0	1982 FIFA World Cup qualification	
25	29 November 1981	Ahmadou Ahidjo Stadium, Yaoundé, Cameroon	Morocco	2–1	2–1	1982 FIFA World Cup qualification	
26	10 March 1984	Felix Houphouet Boigny Stadium, Abidjan, Ivory Coast	Ivory Coast	1–0	2–0	1984 African Cup of Nations	
27	30 July 1984	Navy–Marine Corps Memorial Stadium, Annapolis, United States	Yugoslavia	1–0	1–2	1984 Summer Olympics	
28	15 September 1985	Ahmadou Ahidjo Stadium, Yaoundé, Cameroon	Saudi Arabia	2–0	4–1	1985 Afro-Asian Cup of Nations	
29	15 September 1985	Ahmadou Ahidjo Stadium, Yaoundé, Cameroon	Saudi Arabia	3–0	4–1	1985 Afro-Asian Cup of Nations	
30	8 March 1986	Alexandria Stadium, Alexandria, Egypt	Zambia	1–0	3–2	1986 African Cup of Nations	
31	11 March 1986	Alexandria Stadium, Alexandria, Egypt	Morocco	1–0	1–1	1986 African Cup of Nations	
32	14 March 1986	Alexandria Stadium, Alexandria, Egypt	Algeria	3–1	3–2	1986 African Cup of Nations	
33	17 March 1986	Alexandria Stadium, Alexandria, Egypt	Ivory Coast	1–0	1–0	1986 African Cup of Nations	
34	29 March 1987	Ahmadou Ahidjo Stadium, Yaoundé, Cameroon	Uganda	5–1	5–1	1988 African Cup of Nations qualification	
35	5 July 1987	Ahmadou Ahidjo Stadium, Yaoundé, Cameroon	Sudan	2–0	2–0	1988 African Cup of Nations qualification	
36	15 November 1987	Ahmadou Ahidjo Stadium, Yaoundé, Cameroon	Ghana	1–1	2–2	1988 Summer Olympics qualification	
37	14 March 1988	Prince Moulay Abdellah Stadium, Rabat, Morocco	Egypt	1–0	1–0	1988 African Cup of Nations	
38	17 March 1988	Prince Moulay Abdellah Stadium, Rabat, Morocco	Nigeria	1–1	1–1	1988 African Cup of Nations	
39	14 June 1990	Stadio San Nicola, Bari, Italy	Romania	1–0	2-1	1990 FIFA World Cup	
40	14 June 1990	Stadio San Nicola, Bari, Italy	Romania	2–0	2-1	1990 FIFA World Cup	
41	23 June 1990	Stadio San Paolo, Naples, Italy	Colombia	1–0	2–1	1990 FIFA World Cup	
42	23 June 1990	Stadio San Paolo, Naples, Italy	Colombia	2–0	2–1	1990 FIFA World Cup	
43	28 June 1994	Stanford Stadium, Stanford, United States	Russia	1–3	1–6	1994 FIFA World Cup	

== Honours ==
Léopards Douala

- Cameroon Première Division: 1971–72, 1972–73, 1973–74

Tonnerre Yaoundé

- African Cup Winners' Cup: 1975
- Cameroonian Cup: 1991

Monaco

- Coupe de France: 1979–80

Bastia

- Coupe de France: 1980–81

Montpellier

- Division 2: 1986–87

Saint-Pierroise

- D1 Pro: 1989, 1990
- Coupe de la Réunion: 1989

Cameroon

- African Cup of Nations: 1984, 1988; runner-up, 1986
- Afro-Asian Cup of Nations: 1985

Individual

- African Footballer of the Year: 1976, 1990
- Africa Cup of Nations Best Player: 1986, 1988
- Africa Cup of Nations top scorer: 1986, 1988
- FIFA World Cup Bronze Boot: 1990
- FIFA World Cup All-Star Team: 1990
- FIFA 100
- CAF Best African Player of the last 50 years: 2007
- Golden Foot Legends Award: 2014
- IFFHS Legends
- World Soccer The 100 Greatest Footballers of All Time
- CAF Golden Jubilee #1 Best Player

Orders

- Knight of the Legion of Honour: 2006

== See also ==
- List of men's footballers with 500 or more goals
- List of FIFA World Cup top goalscorers
