= Bright Omokaro =

Nigerian footballer

Personal information
- Date of birth: 24 February 1965 (age 61)
- Position: Defender

International career
Years	Team	Apps	(Gls)
- Nigeria

Bright Omokaro (born 24 February 1965) is a Nigerian football coach and former footballer who played as a defender. He competed in the men's tournament at the 1988 Summer Olympics. He works presently as the head coach of Osun United FC in the Nigeria National League
