= 1986 FIFA World Cup qualification (CAF) =

Tournament statistics
- Top scorer: (Tunisia) Bassam Jeridi (5 goals)

Listed below are the dates and results for the 1986 FIFA World Cup qualification rounds for the African zone (CAF). For an overview of the qualification rounds, see the article 1986 FIFA World Cup qualification.

A total of 29 CAF teams entered the competition. The African Zone was allocated 2 places (out of 24) in the final tournament.

== Format ==
There would be four rounds of play:

- First Round: 3 teams, Algeria, Cameroon and Ghana, received byes and advanced to the Second Round directly. The remaining 26 teams were paired up to play knockout matches on a home-and-away basis. The winners would advance to the Second Round.
- Second Round and Third Round: In each of these rounds, the teams were paired up to play knockout matches on a home-and-away basis. The winners would advance to the next round, until there would be 4 teams left.
- Final Round: The 4 teams were paired up to play knockout matches on a home-and-away basis. The winners would qualify.

== First round ==
Team 1	Agg.	Team 2	1st leg	2nd leg
Egypt	2–1	Zimbabwe	1–0	1–1
Kenya	5–4	Ethiopia	2–1	3–3
Mauritius	0–5	Malawi	0–1	0–4
Zambia	3–1	Uganda	3–0	0–1
Tanzania	1–1 (a)	Sudan	1–1	0–0
Sierra Leone	0–5	Morocco	0–1	0–4
Benin	0–6	Tunisia	0–2	0–4
Ivory Coast	6–3	Gambia	4–0	2–3
Nigeria	4–0	Liberia	3–0	1–0
Angola	1–1 (4–3 p)	Senegal	1–0	0–1
Madagascar	w/o	Lesotho	—	—
Libya	w/o	Niger	—	—
Guinea	w/o	Togo	—	—
Algeria	Bye			
Cameroon	Bye			
Ghana	Bye			

28 August 1984

Egypt	1–0	Zimbabwe
Mayhoub 7'

Nasser Stadium, Cairo, Egypt
Attendance: 80,000
Referee: Gebreysus Tesfaye (Ethiopia)
30 September 1984

Zimbabwe	1–1	Egypt
Sedki 9' (o.g.)		Suleiman 34'

Rufaro Stadium, Harare, Zimbabwe
Attendance: 40,000
Referee: Billy Phambala (Malawi)

Egypt won 2–1 on agg. and advanced to the Second Round.

13 October 1984

Kenya	2–1	Ethiopia
Masiga 16'; Tabu 57'		Kebede 19'

Nairobi City Stadium, Nairobi, Kenya
Referee: Mohammed Jama (Somalia)
28 October 1984

Ethiopia	3–3	Kenya
Haile 9'; Tesfaye 37'; Kebede 80'		Ayoyi 48'; Masiga 56'; Onyango 88'

Addis Ababa Stadium, Addis Ababa, Ethiopia
Referee: John Nkathazo (Zimbabwe)

Kenya won 5–4 on agg. and advanced to the Second Round.

15 July 1984

Mauritius	0–1	Malawi
		Phuka 44'

Stade George V, Curepipe, Mauritius
Referee: Said Ali Khamis (Kenya)
28 July 1984

Malawi	4–0	Mauritius
Sinalo 2', 89'; Leclézio 48' (o.g.); Waya 84'

Civo Stadium, Lilongwe, Malawi
Referee: Jean-Fidele Diramba (Gabon)

Malawi won 5–0 on agg. and advanced to the Second Round.

29 July 1984

Zambia	3–0	Uganda
Hangunyu 44'; Msiska 51'; Bwalya 89'

Dag Hammarskjöld Stadium, Ndola, Zambia
Referee: Hafid Ali Tahir (Tanzania)
25 August 1984

Uganda	1–0	Zambia
Katerega 73'

Lugogo Stadium, Kampala, Uganda
Referee: Alhati Salahudeen (Niger)

Zambia won 3–1 on agg. and advanced to the Second Round.

13 October 1984

Tanzania	1–1	Sudan
Tino 28'		Mazda 68'

CCM Kirumba Stadium, Mwanza, Tanzania
Referee: George Katumba (Uganda)
27 October 1984

Sudan	0–0	Tanzania

Khartoum Stadium, Khartoum, Sudan
Referee: Amin Salem (Egypt)

Sudan advanced to the Second Round on away goals after a draw 1–1 on agg.

30 June 1984

Sierra Leone	0–1	Morocco
		M. Merry 87'

Siaka Steven Stadium, Freetown, Sierra Leone
Referee: Luc Agbala (Togo)
15 July 1984

Morocco	4–0	Sierra Leone
M. Merry 34', 77'; Dahane 51' (pen.); Labied 81'

Moulay Abdellah Stadium, Rabat, Morocco
Referee: Badara Sene (Senegal)

Morocco won 5–0 on agg. and advanced to the Second Round.

28 October 1984

Benin	0–2	Tunisia
		Jeridi 63'; Gasri 86'

Stade de l'Amitié, Cotonou, Benin
Referee: Ouattara (Ivory Coast)
13 November 1984

Tunisia	4–0	Benin
Jeridi 5', 16'; Rakbaoui 56'; Gasri 74'

Stade El Menzah, Tunis, Tunisia
Attendance: 12,000
Referee: Baba Laouissi (Morocco)

Tunisia won 6–0 on agg. and advanced to the Second Round.

21 October 1984

Ivory Coast	4–0	Gambia
Traoré 47', 62'; N'Dri 66'; Ben Salah 84'

Stade Félix Houphouët-Boigny, Abidjan, Ivory Coast
Referee: Karim Camara (Guinea)
4 November 1984

Gambia	3–2	Ivory Coast
Sowe 22'; Ndour 66'; Wadda 81'		Traoré 40'; Tiéhi 54'

Independence Stadium, Banjul, Gambia
Referee: Idrissa Traoré (Mali)

Ivory Coast won 6–3 on agg. and advanced to the Second Round.

20 October 1984

Nigeria	3–0	Liberia
Edobor 7', 15'; Adeshina 78'

Surulere Stadium, Lagos, Nigeria
Attendance: 50,000
Referee: Joseph-Marie Ouedraogo (Burkina Faso)
4 November 1984

Liberia	0–1	Nigeria
		Temile 42'

SKD Stadium, Monrovia, Liberia
Attendance: 10,000
Referee: Amadou Mamoudou (Niger)

Nigeria won 4–0 on agg. and advanced to the Second Round.

1 July 1984

Angola	1–0	Senegal
Ivo 57'

Estádio dos Coqueiros, Luanda, Angola
Referee: Simon Bantsimba (Congo)
15 July 1984

Senegal	1–0 (a.e.t.)	Angola
Sèye 24'
Penalties
	3 – 4

Stade Demba Diop, Dakar, Senegal
Referee: Paul Alain Hioba-Hioba (Cameroon)

Angola advanced to the Second Round on penalties after a draw won 1–1 on agg.

Madagascar	w/o	Lesotho
		Withdrew

Madagascar advanced to the Second Round, Lesotho withdrew.

Libya	w/o	Niger
		Withdrew

Libya advanced to the Second Round, Niger withdrew.

Guinea	w/o	Togo
		Withdrew

Guinea advanced to the Second Round, Togo withdrew.

== Second round ==
Team 1	Agg.	Team 2	1st leg	2nd leg
Zambia	5–2	Cameroon	4–1	1–1
Morocco	2–0	Malawi	2–0	0–0
Angola	2–3	Algeria	0–0	2–3
Kenya	1–6	Nigeria	0–3	1–3
Egypt	1–1 (4–2 p)	Madagascar	1–0	0–1
Guinea	1–2	Tunisia	1–0	0–2
Sudan	0–4	Libya	0–0	0–4
Ivory Coast	0–2	Ghana	0–0	0–2

7 April 1985

Zambia	4–1	Cameroon
Chabala 24', 38', 40'; Njovu 28'		Kana-Biyik 70'

7 April Stadium, Lusaka, Zambia
Referee: Frank Valdemarca (Zimbabwe)
21 April 1985

Cameroon	1–1	Zambia
M'Fédé 31'		Chilengi 5'

Ahmadou Ahidjo Stadium, Yaoundé, Cameroon
Referee: Jean-Fidele Diramba (Gabon)

Zambia won 5–2 on agg. and advanced to the Third Round.

7 April 1985

Morocco	2–0	Malawi
El Haddaoui 10'; Dahane 75' (pen.)

Moulay Abdellah Stadium, Rabat, Morocco
Attendance: 20,862
Referee: Ali Bin Nasser (Tunisia)
21 April 1985

Malawi	0–0	Morocco

Kamuzu Stadium, Blantyre, Malawi
Attendance: 50,000
Referee: Nyrenda Chayu (Zambia)

Morocco won 2–0 on agg. and advanced to the Third Round.

31 March 1985

Angola	0–0	Algeria

Estádio dos Coqueiros, Luanda, Angola
Attendance: 20 000
Referee: Karim Camara (Guinea)
19 April 1985

Algeria	3–2	Angola
Mansouri 14'; Menad 42'; Bouiche 65'		Jesus 78'; Machado 83'

Stade 5 Juillet 1962, Algiers, Algeria
Attendance: 50 000
Referee: Idrissa Traoré (Mali)

Algeria won 3–2 on agg. and advanced to the Third Round.

6 April 1985

Kenya	0–3	Nigeria
		Edobor 12'; Keshi 45'; Yekini 47'

Nairobi City Stadium, Nairobi, Kenya
Attendance: 50,000
Referee: Bester Kalombo (Malawi)
20 April 1985

Nigeria	3–1	Kenya
Sadi 18'; Yekini 20'; Sofoluwe 89'		Masiga 36'

Surulere Stadium, Lagos, Nigeria
Attendance: 35,000
Referee: Doudou N'Jie (Gambia)

Nigeria won 6–1 on agg. and advanced to the Third Round.

5 April 1985

Egypt	1–0	Madagascar
Suleiman 64'

Nasser Stadium, Cairo, Egypt
Attendance: 65,000
Referee: Belaid Lacarne (Algeria)
21 April 1985

Madagascar	1–0 (a.e.t.)	Egypt
Rafanodina 57'
Penalties
	2 – 4

Mahamasina Municipal Stadium, Antananarivo, Madagascar
Referee: Edwin Picon-Ackong (Mauritius)

Egypt advanced to the Third Round on penalties after a draw 1–1 on agg.

10 February 1985

Guinea	1–0	Tunisia
Diaby 14'

Stade du 28 Septembre, Conakry, Guinea
Referee: Adonis Eboule (Ivory Coast)
24 February 1985

Tunisia	2–0	Guinea
Braham 24'; Hsoumi 80'

Stade El Menzah, Tunis, Tunisia
Attendance: 12,000
Referee: Salem Sherif (Libya)

Tunisia won 2–1 on agg. and advanced to the Third Round.

22 February 1985

Sudan	0–0	Libya

Khartoum Stadium, Khartoum, Sudan
Attendance: 25,000
Referee: Said Ali Khamis (Kenya)
8 March 1985

Libya	4–0	Sudan
Ben Brahim 53'; Al-Beshari 55'; Al-Maadani 61'; Bani 71'

11 June Stadium, Tripoli, Libya
Attendance: 80,000
Referee: Hama Djibo (Nigeria)

Libya won 4–0 on agg. and advanced to the Third Round.

7 April 1985

Ivory Coast	0–0	Ghana

Stade Félix Houphouët-Boigny, Abidjan, Ivory Coast
Referee: Baba Laouissi (Morocco)
21 April 1985

Ghana	2–0	Ivory Coast
Nti 50'; Alhassan 79'

National Sports Council Stadium, Kumasi, Ghana
Attendance: 50,421
Referee: Simon Bantsimba (Congo)

Ghana won 2–0 on agg. and advanced to the Third Round.

== Third round ==
Team 1	Agg.	Team 2	1st leg	2nd leg
Algeria	3–0	Zambia	2–0	1–0
Ghana	0–2	Libya	0–0	0–2
Nigeria	1–2	Tunisia	1–0	0–2
Egypt	0–2	Morocco	0–0	0–2

13 July 1985

Algeria	2–0	Zambia
Bensaoula 15'; Madjer 84'

Stade 5 Juillet 1962, Algiers, Algeria
Attendance: 60,000
Referee: Mohamed Hussam El-Din (Egypt)
28 July 1985

Zambia	0–1	Algeria
		Bensaoula 78'

Independence Stadium, Lusaka, Zambia
Attendance: 35,000
Referee: Edwin Picon-Ackong (Mauritius)

Algeria won 3–0 on agg. and advanced to the Final Round.

14 July 1985

Ghana	0–0	Libya

Ohene Djan Stadium, Accra, Ghana
Referee: Alhagi Faye (Gambia)
26 July 1985

Libya	2–0	Ghana
Al-Senussi 33'; Al-Qadi 70' (pen.)

28 March Stadium, Benghazi, Libya
Referee: Baba Laouissi (Morocco)

Libya won 2–0 on agg. and advanced to the Final Round.

6 July 1985

Nigeria	1–0	Tunisia
Isima 77'

Surulere Stadium, Lagos, Nigeria
Attendance: 60,000
Referee: Jean-Fidele Diramba (Gabon)
20 July 1985

Tunisia	2–0	Nigeria
Jeridi 8', 28'

Stade El Menzah, Tunis, Tunisia
Attendance: 33,000
Referee: Mohamed Hansal (Algeria)

Tunisia won 2–1 on agg. and advanced to the Final Round.

12 July 1985

Egypt	0–0	Morocco

Cairo International Stadium, Cairo, Egypt
Referee: Frank Valdemarca (Zimbabwe)
28 July 1985

Morocco	2–0	Egypt
Timoumi 37'; Bouderbala 82'

Stade Mohamed V, Casablanca, Morocco
Attendance: 100,000
Referee: Badara Sène (Senegal)

Morocco won 2–0 on agg. and advanced to the Final Round.

== Final round ==
Team 1	Agg.	Team 2	1st leg	2nd leg
Tunisia	1–7	Algeria	1–4	0–3
Morocco	3–1	Libya	3–0	0–1

6 October 1985

Tunisia	1–4	Algeria
Rakbaoui 16'		Madjer 24'; Menad 43', 87'; Kaci-Saïd 67'

Stade El Menzah, Tunis
Attendance: 40,000
Referee: Roger Schoeters (Belgium)
18 October 1985

Algeria	3–0	Tunisia
Madjer 8'; Menad 34'; Yahi 78'

Stade 5 Juillet 1962, Algiers
Attendance: 90,000
Referee: Bruno Galler (Switzerland)

Algeria won 7–1 on agg. and qualified for the 1986 FIFA World Cup.

6 October 1985

Morocco	3–0	Libya
Merry 44' (pen.); Timoumi 85'; Bouderbala 90'

Stade Mohamed V, Casablanca
Attendance: 60,000
Referee: Nyrenda Chayu (Zambia)
18 October 1985

Libya	1–0	Morocco
Al-Farjani 43'

28 March Stadium, Benghazi
Attendance: 40,000
Referee: Luigi Agnolin (Italy)

Morocco won 3–1 on agg. and qualified for the 1986 FIFA World Cup.

== Qualified teams ==
Team	Qualified as	Qualified on	Previous appearances in FIFA World Cup^{1}
Algeria	Final Round winners	18 October 1985	1 (1982)
Morocco	Final Round winners	18 October 1985	1 (1970)

^{1} Bold indicates champions for that year. Italic indicates hosts for that year.

== Goalscorers ==
5 goals

- (Tunisia) Bassam Jeridi

4 goals

- (Algeria) Djamel Menad
- (Morocco) Mustapha Merry

3 goals

- (Algeria) Rabah Madjer
- (Ivory Coast) Abdoulaye Traoré
- (Kenya) Joe Masiga
- (Zambia) Michael Chabala

2 goals

- (Algeria) Tedj Bensaoula
- (Egypt) Emad Suleiman
- (Ethiopia) Mulugeta Kebede
- (Malawi) Frank Sinalo
- (Morocco) Aziz Bouderbala
- (Morocco) Saad Dahane
- (Morocco) Mohamed Timoumi
- (Nigeria) Humphrey Edobor
- (Nigeria) Rashidi Yekini
- (Tunisia) Mohamed Gasri
- (Tunisia) Abdelkader Rakbaoui

1 goal

- (Algeria) Nasser Bouiche
- (Algeria) Mohamed Kaci-Saïd
- (Algeria) Faouzi Mansouri
- (Algeria) Hocine Yahi
- (Angola) Jesus
- (Angola) Eduardo Machado
- (Angola) Ivo Raimundo Traça
- (Cameroon) André Kana-Biyik
- (Cameroon) Louis-Paul M'Fédé
- (Ivory Coast) Oumar Ben Salah
- (Ivory Coast) Kouassi N'Dri
- (Ivory Coast) Joël Tiéhi
- (Egypt) Alaa Mayhoub
- (Ethiopia) Gebremedhin Haile
- (Ethiopia) Dagne Tesfaye
- (The Gambia) Cheikh Ndour
- (The Gambia) Baboucar Sowe
- (The Gambia) Bai Malleh Wadda
- (Ghana) George Alhassan
- (Ghana) Opoku Nti
- (Guinea) Alsény Diaby
- (Kenya) Sammy Ayoyi
- (Kenya) Sammy Onyango
- (Kenya) Sam Tabu
- (Libya) Ali Al-Beshari
- (Libya) Abdel Razak Al-Farjani
- (Libya) Ibrahim Al-Maadani
- (Libya) Ayad Al-Qadi
- (Libya) Reda Al-Senussi
- (Libya) Aboubaker Bani
- (Libya) Abubaker Ben Brahim
- (Madagascar) Herilia Rafanodina
- (Malawi) Ricky Phuka
- (Malawi) Harry Waya
- (Morocco) Mustapha El Haddaoui
- (Morocco) Khalid Labied
- (Nigeria) Ademola Adeshina
- (Nigeria) Fatai Amoo
- (Nigeria) Okey Isima
- (Nigeria) Stephen Keshi
- (Nigeria) Dahiru Sadi
- (Nigeria) Yisa Sofoluwe
- (Nigeria) Clement Temile
- (Senegal) Abdou Karim Sèye
- (Sudan) Mazda
- (Tanzania) Peter Tino
- (Tunisia) Hakim Braham
- (Tunisia) Lotfi Hsoumi
- (Uganda) Godfrey Katerega
- (Zambia) Kalusha Bwalya
- (Zambia) Jones Chilengi
- (Zambia) Fanny Hangunyu
- (Zambia) Lucky Msiska
- (Zambia) Aaron Njovu

1 own goal

- (Egypt) Hamada Sedki (playing against Zimbabwe)
- (Mauritius) Bernard Leclézio (playing against Malawi)

== See also ==
- 1986 FIFA World Cup qualification (UEFA)
- 1986 FIFA World Cup qualification (CONMEBOL)
- 1986 FIFA World Cup qualification (CONCACAF)
- 1986 FIFA World Cup qualification (AFC)
- 1986 FIFA World Cup qualification (OFC)
