= Football at the 1979 Mediterranean Games – Men's team squads =

Below are the squads for the Football at the 1979 Mediterranean Games, hosted in Split, Yugoslavia, and took place between 21 and 29 September 1979.

== Group A ==
=== Egypt ===
Coach:

No.	Pos.	Player	Date of birth (age)	Caps	Goals	Club
	GK	Thabet El-Batal	16 September 1953 (aged 26)			(Egyptian Football Association) Al-Ahly
	GK	Adel El-Maamour	30 November 1954 (aged 24)			(Egyptian Football Association) Zamalek
	DF	Mohamed Salah	19 July 1958 (aged 21)			(Egyptian Football Association) Zamalek
	DF	Medhat Ramadan	1 October 1958 (aged 20)			(Egyptian Football Association) Al-Ahly
	DF	Maher Hammam	3 October 1956 (aged 22)			(Egyptian Football Association) Al-Ahly
	DF	Ibrahim Youssef	1 January 1959 (aged 20)			(Egyptian Football Association) Zamalek
	MF	Farouk Gaafar	29 October 1952 (aged 26)			(Egyptian Football Association) Zamalek
	MF	Wahid Kamil				(Egyptian Football Association) Zamalek
	MF	Mokhtar Mokhtar	17 August 1952 (aged 27)			(Egyptian Football Association) Al-Ahly
	MF	Fathi Mabrouk	5 July 1951 (aged 28)			(Egyptian Football Association) Al-Ahly
	MF	Hamdi Nouh				(Egyptian Football Association) El-Mokawloon El-Arab
	MF	Shawky Gharieb	26 February 1959 (aged 20)			(Egyptian Football Association) Ghazl El-Mahalla
	MF	Mohamed Nur				(Egyptian Football Association) Al-Ittihad Alexandria
	FW	Mussad Nur	23 April 1951 (aged 28)			(Egyptian Football Association) Al-Masry
	FW	Gamal Abdel-Hameed	24 November 1957 (aged 21)			(Egyptian Football Association) Al-Ahly
	FW	Sherif Abdel Moneim				(Egyptian Football Association) Al-Ahly
	FW	Ossama Khalil	5 February 1954 (aged 25)			(Egyptian Football Association) Ismaily

=== Greece Ol. ===
Coach: Stefanos Petritsis

No.	Pos.	Player	Date of birth (age)	Caps	Goals	Club
	DF	Christos Ziakos	5 February 1955 (aged 24)			(Hellenic Football Federation) Panathinaikos
		... Tziontzios				
		... Koktsidis				
		... Kouimtzidis				
		... Tsirikas				
	FW	Nikos Kourouzidis	31 August 1958 (aged 21)			
	MF	Anastasios Strantzalis	31 August 1952 (aged 27)			(Hellenic Football Federation) Doxa Drama
		... Miskos				
	MF	Andreas Anagnostou	2 May 1960 (aged 19)			(Hellenic Football Federation) Pierikos
	MF	Vasilios Dadakos	7 June 1959 (aged 20)			
	MF	Michalis Gerothodoros	9 April 1958 (aged 21)			(Hellenic Football Federation) Fostiras
	GK	Stavros Gatzilakis	13 April 1953 (aged 26)			(Hellenic Football Federation) Doxa Drama
	MF	Giorgos Pisas	15 January 1956 (aged 23)			(Hellenic Football Federation) Korinthos
	DF	Giorgos Kastanos	20 July 1958 (aged 21)			(Hellenic Football Federation) Panathinaikos
	FW	Takis Karagiozopoulos	4 February 1961 (aged 18)			(Hellenic Football Federation) Veria
		... Chatzigiovanakis				

=== Morocco ===
Coach: (France) Guy Cluseau

No.	Pos.	Player	Date of birth (age)	Caps	Goals	Club
	GK	Badou Zaki	2 April 1959 (aged 20)			(Royal Moroccan Football Federation) Wydad Casablanca
	DF	Jawad El Andaloussi				(Royal Moroccan Football Federation) Raja Casablanca
	DF	Mohamed "Chicha" Rabih				
	DF	Mustapha Tahiri (captain)				(Royal Moroccan Football Federation) US Sidi Kacem
	MF	Aziz Bouderbala	26 December 1960 (aged 18)			(Royal Moroccan Football Federation) Wydad Casablanca
	MF	Abdelmajid Dolmy	19 April 1953 (aged 26)			(Royal Moroccan Football Federation) Raja Casablanca
	MF	Houcine Lahcen				(Royal Moroccan Football Federation) FAR Rabat
	MF	Kamel Smiri				(Royal Moroccan Football Federation) MC Oujda
	MF	Mohamed Timoumi	15 January 1960 (aged 19)			(Royal Moroccan Football Federation) US Touarga
	FW	Ahmed Alaoui	1 January 1949 (aged 30)			(Royal Moroccan Football Federation) RS Settat
	FW	Mohamed Boussati				(Royal Moroccan Football Federation) Kenitra AC
	FW	Jamal Jebrane	20 August 1957 (aged 22)			(Royal Moroccan Football Federation) Kenitra AC
	FW	Khalid Labied	24 August 1955 (aged 24)			(Royal Moroccan Football Federation) FUS de Rabat
	FW	Mustapha Mahrous				(Royal Moroccan Football Federation) AS Salé
	FW	Abdelmajid Shaita	19 January 1954 (aged 25)			(Royal Moroccan Football Federation) Wydad Casablanca

=== Yugoslavia Ol. ===
Coach: Ivan Toplak

No.	Pos.	Player	Date of birth (age)	Caps	Goals	Club
	GK	Tomislav Ivković	11 August 1960 (aged 19)			(Football Association of Yugoslavia) Dinamo Zagreb
	GK	Aleksandar Stojanović	19 June 1954 (aged 25)			(Football Association of Yugoslavia) Red Star Belgrade
	DF	Srećko Bogdan	5 January 1957 (aged 22)			(Football Association of Yugoslavia) Dinamo Zagreb
	DF	Ismet Hadžić	7 July 1954 (aged 25)			(Football Association of Yugoslavia) Sloboda Tuzla
	DF	Miloš Hrstić	20 November 1955 (aged 23)			(Football Association of Yugoslavia) NK Rijeka
	DF	Mišo Krstičević	19 February 1958 (aged 21)			(Football Association of Yugoslavia) Hajduk Split
	DF	Boro Primorac	5 December 1954 (aged 24)			(Football Association of Yugoslavia) Hajduk Split
	DF	Vedran Rožić	2 November 1954 (aged 24)			(Football Association of Yugoslavia) Hajduk Split
	DF	Nenad Starovlah	29 July 1955 (aged 24)			(Football Association of Yugoslavia) Željezničar Sarajevo
	DF	Zoran Vujović	26 August 1958 (aged 21)			(Football Association of Yugoslavia) Hajduk Split
	MF	Nikica Cukrov	6 March 1954 (aged 25)			(Football Association of Yugoslavia) HNK Rijeka
	MF	Rajko Janjanin	18 January 1957 (aged 22)			(Football Association of Yugoslavia) Dinamo Zagreb
	MF	Dragan Okuka	2 April 1954 (aged 25)			(Football Association of Yugoslavia) Velež Mostar
	MF	Blaž Slišković	30 May 1959 (aged 20)			(Football Association of Yugoslavia) Velež Mostar
	FW	Predrag Pašić	18 October 1958 (aged 20)			(Football Association of Yugoslavia) FK Sarajevo
	FW	Miloš Šestić	8 August 1956 (aged 23)			(Football Association of Yugoslavia) Red Star Belgrade
	FW	Zlatko Vujović	26 August 1958 (aged 21)			(Football Association of Yugoslavia) Hajduk Split

== Group B ==
=== Algeria B ===
Coach: Mahieddine Khalef

No.	Pos.	Player	Date of birth (age)	Caps	Goals	Club
1	GK	Mehdi Cerbah	3 April 1953 (aged 26)			(Algerian Football Federation) JE Tizi Ouzou
2	DF	Mahmoud Guendouz	4 February 1953 (aged 26)			(Algerian Football Federation) MA Hussein Dey
5	DF	Chaâbane Merzekane	18 March 1959 (aged 20)			(Algerian Football Federation) MA Hussein Dey
6	MF	Smaïl Slimani	31 December 1956 (aged 22)			(Algerian Football Federation) USK Alger
7	FW	Tedj Bensaoula	1 December 1954 (aged 24)			(Algerian Football Federation) MP Oran
8	MF	Ali Fergani (captain)	21 September 1952 (aged 27)			(Algerian Football Federation) JE Tizi Ouzou
9	FW	Abdeslam Bousri	28 January 1953 (aged 26)			(Algerian Football Federation) MP Alger
10	MF	Ali Bencheikh	9 January 1955 (aged 24)			(Algerian Football Federation) MP Alger
11	FW	Bachir Douadi	11 December 1953 (aged 25)			(Algerian Football Federation) JE Tizi Ouzou
15	FW	Salah Assad	13 March 1958 (aged 21)			(Algerian Football Federation) RS Kouba
16	MF	Lakhdar Belloumi	29 December 1958 (aged 20)			(Algerian Football Federation) MP Oran
17	DF	Abdelkader Horr	10 November 1953 (aged 25)			(Algerian Football Federation) DNC Alger
	GK	Mohamed Aït Mouhoub	5 November 1952 (aged 26)			(Algerian Football Federation) MP Alger
	DF	Mahieddine Safsafi	14 March 1957 (aged 22)			(Algerian Football Federation) MA Hussein Dey
	DF	Mohamed Chaïb	20 May 1957 (aged 22)			(Algerian Football Federation) RS Kouba
	DF	Rezki Maghrici	5 May 1953 (aged 26)			(Algerian Football Federation) JE Tizi Ouzou
	MF	Lyès Bahbouh	6 April 1957 (aged 22)			(Algerian Football Federation) JE Tizi Ouzou

=== France Amateur ===
Coach: Gabriel Robert

No.	Pos.	Player	Date of birth (age)	Caps	Goals	Club
	GK	Jean-Pierre Mottet	1 April 1959 (aged 20)			(French Football Federation) Lille OSC
	GK	Raymond Esclassan	18 October 1958 (aged 20)			(French Football Federation) FC Grenoble
	DF	Jean-Louis Bérenguier	28 February 1958 (aged 21)			(French Football Federation) SC Toulon
	DF	Jean-Claude Lafargue	23 December 1959 (aged 19)			(French Football Federation) Paris FC
	DF	Dominique Trenoras	27 May 1952 (aged 27)			(French Football Federation) ÉDS Montluçon
	DF	Jacques Raymond	30 November 1950 (aged 28)			(French Football Federation) RC Franc-Comtois
	DF	Jean-Claude Fagès	8 September 1958 (aged 21)			(French Football Federation) AS Monaco
	DF	Philippe Krug	16 May 1957 (aged 22)			(French Football Federation) FC Mulhouse
	DF	Daniel Bruno	6 November 1959 (aged 19)			(French Football Federation) Olympique Lyonnais
	MF	Paul Brot	18 February 1950 (aged 29)			(French Football Federation) AJ Auxerre
	MF	Jacques Manic	26 February 1949 (aged 30)			(French Football Federation) AAJ Blois
	MF	Roger Ricort	7 January 1959 (aged 20)			(French Football Federation) AS Monaco
	FW	José Duch	1 May 1950 (aged 29)			(French Football Federation) FC Gueugnon
	FW	Alain Couriol	24 October 1958 (aged 20)			(French Football Federation) AS Monaco
	FW	Antoine Trivino	13 June 1952 (aged 27)			(French Football Federation) AS Cannes
	FW	José Touré	24 April 1961 (aged 18)			(French Football Federation) FC Nantes
	FW	Fabrice Picot	20 May 1960 (aged 19)			(French Football Federation) FC Nantes

=== Tunisia ===
Coach: Ahmed Dhib

No.	Pos.	Player	Date of birth (age)	Caps	Goals	Club
	GK	Mokhtar Naili	3 September 1953 (aged 26)			(Tunisian Football Federation) Club Africain
	GK	Abdelwahed Ben Abdallah	8 January 1955 (aged 24)			(Tunisian Football Federation) CS Sfaxien
	DF	Amor Jebali	24 December 1956 (aged 22)			(Tunisian Football Federation) AS Marsa
	DF	Khaled Ben Yahia	12 November 1959 (aged 19)			(Tunisian Football Federation) ES Tunis
	DF	Mohsen "Jendoubi" Labidi	15 January 1954 (aged 25)			(Tunisian Football Federation) Stade Tunisien
	DF	Kamel Chebli	9 March 1954 (aged 25)			(Tunisian Football Federation) Club Africain
	MF	Ridha Boushih	24 August 1956 (aged 23)			(Tunisian Football Federation) Club Africain
	MF	Khaled Gasmi	8 April 1953 (aged 26)			(Tunisian Football Federation) CA Bizertin
	MF	Mohamed Ben Mahmoud	24 May 1957 (aged 22)			(Tunisian Football Federation) ES Tunis
	FW	Rached Tounsi	2 February 1954 (aged 25)			(Tunisian Football Federation) Stade Tunisien
	FW	Abdelhamid Hergal	27 January 1959 (aged 20)			(Tunisian Football Federation) Stade Tunisien
	FW	Mustapha Sassi				(Tunisian Football Federation) Sfax RS
	FW	Mongi Ben Brahim	3 February 1955 (aged 24)			(Swiss Football Association) La Chaux-de-Fonds
	FW	Hédi Bayari	9 November 1955 (aged 23)			(Tunisian Football Federation) Club Africain

=== Turkey B ===
Coach: Nihat Atacan

No.	Pos.	Player	Date of birth (age)	Caps	Goals	Club
	GK	Mustafa Ceylan				(Turkish Football Federation) Galatasaray
	GK	Aslan Meriç	10 October 1959 (aged 19)			(Turkish Football Federation) Bursaspor
		Süleyman Oktay	9 January 1959 (aged 20)			(Turkish Football Federation) Beşiktaş
		Kadir Akbulut	8 May 1960 (aged 19)			(Turkish Football Federation) Denizlispor
		Mustafa Ulucan	9 August 1959 (aged 20)			(Turkish Football Federation) Adanaspor
		Muzaffer Badalıoğlu	13 November 1960 (aged 18)			(Turkish Football Federation) Zonguldakspor
		İsmet Saral				(Turkish Football Federation) Vefa
		Nedret Oğuz Aydoğdu	8 January 1960 (aged 19)			(Turkish Football Federation) Galatasaray
		Burhan Söğütlü	11 August 1958 (aged 21)			(Turkish Football Federation) Eskişehirspor
		Ziya Doğan	17 December 1961 (aged 17)			(Turkish Football Federation) Beşiktaş
		Alper Timur	17 February 1961 (aged 18)			(Turkish Football Federation) Altay
		Mahmut Kılıç	28 March 1961 (aged 18)			(Turkish Football Federation) Orduspor
		Aykut Yiğit	7 October 1959 (aged 19)			(Turkish Football Federation) Sakaryaspor
		Nevzat Şuvak	18 June 1958 (aged 21)			(Turkish Football Federation) Ankara Demirspor
		Rıdvan Çeçen	18 November 1957 (aged 21)			(Turkish Football Federation) Kayserispor
		Ümit Türkoğlu	11 June 1956 (aged 23)			(Turkish Football Federation) Çorumspor
