= 2015–16 Egyptian Premier League =

Egyptian Premier League
- Season: 2015–16
- Dates: 20 October 2015 – 9 July 2016
- Champions: Al Ahly; 38th Premier League title
- Relegated: Ittihad El Shorta; Haras El Hodoud; Ghazl El Mahalla
- Champions League: Al Ahly; Zamalek
- Confederation Cup: Smouha; Al Masry
- Matches: 306
- Goals: 676 (2.21 per match)
- Top goalscorer: Hossam Salama (17 goals)
- Biggest home win: Zamalek 5–0 Ghazl El Mahalla (23 December 2015)
- Biggest away win: Al Ittihad 0–5 Ismaily (12 November 2015)
- Highest scoring: Al Ahly 7–3 Ittihad El Shorta (7 January 2016)
- Longest winning run: Zamalek (8 matches)
- Longest unbeaten run: Al Ahly (20 matches)
- Longest winless run: Ghazl El Mahalla (34 matches)
- Longest losing run: Al Ittihad (8 matches)
- All statistics correct as of 9 July 2016.

The 2015–16 Egyptian Premier League was the 57th season of the Egyptian Premier League, the top Egyptian professional league for association football clubs, since its establishment in 1948. The fixtures were announced on 20 September 2015. The season began on 20 October 2015 and concluded on 9 July 2016.

Zamalek began the season as defending champions of the 2014–15 season. Aswan, El Entag El Harby and Ghazl El Mahalla entered as the three promoted teams from the 2014–15 Egyptian Second Division.

On 24 June 2016, Al Ahly won the title with two games to spare after a 2–1 away win over Ismaily to secure their 38th Egyptian Premier League title.

== Teams ==
Locations of the 2015–16 Egyptian Premier League teams

Unlike the previous season, a total of 18 teams will contest the league, including 15 sides from the 2014–15 season and 3 promoted from the Egyptian Second Division.

=== Stadium and location ===
Team	Location	Stadium
Al Ahly	Cairo	Borg El Arab Stadium (Selected matches); Petro Sport Stadium
Aswan	Aswan	Aswan Stadium
El Dakhleya	Cairo	30 June Stadium
El Entag El Harby	Cairo	Al Salam Stadium
ENPPI	Cairo	Petro Sport Stadium
Ghazl El Mahalla	El Mahalla	Ghazl El Mahalla Stadium
Haras El Hodoud	Alexandria	Harras El Hodoud Stadium
Ismaily	Ismailia	Ismailia Stadium
Al Ittihad	Alexandria	Alexandria Stadium
Ittihad El Shorta	Cairo	Police Academy Stadium
Al Masry	Port Said	Ismailia Stadium^{1}
Misr Lel Makkasa	Fayoum	Fayoum Stadium
Al Mokawloon	Cairo	Arab Contractors Stadium
Petrojet	Suez	Suez Stadium
Smouha	Alexandria	Alexandria Stadium
Tala'ea El Gaish	Cairo	Cairo Military Academy Stadium
Wadi Degla	Cairo	30 June Stadium
Zamalek	Cairo	Petro Sport Stadium

^{1} Al Masry's original stadium is Port Said Stadium in Port Said, but due to the Port Said Stadium riot in 2012 the Egyptian Football Association banned Al Masry from playing matches at Port Said Stadium until the end of the 2015–16 season, and instead they will play at Ismailia Stadium.

=== Managerial changes ===
Team	Outgoing manager	Manner of departure	Date of vacancy	Position in table	Incoming manager	Date of appointment
El Entag El Harby	(Egypt) Moamen Soliman	Mutual consent	27 June 2015	Pre-season	(Egypt) Shawky Gharieb	22 July 2015
Al Ahly	(Egypt) Fathi Mabrouk	Sacked	5 October 2015	Pre-season	(Portugal) José Peseiro	9 October 2015
Ghazl El Mahalla	(Egypt) Mohamed Geneddy	Sacked	1 November 2015	18	(Egypt) Ahmed Hassan	1 November 2015
Smouha	(Egypt) Mohamed Youssef	Sacked	1 November 2015	12	(Egypt) Mimi Abdel Razek	1 November 2015
Al Mokawloon	(Egypt) Hassan Shehata	Resigned	13 November 2015	16	(Egypt) Tarek El Ashry	15 November 2015
Al Ittihad	(Bulgaria) Stoycho Mladenov	Mutual consent	15 November 2015	8	(Portugal) Leonel Pontes	20 November 2015
Haras El Hodoud	(Egypt) Abdul-Hamid Bassiouny	Resigned	16 November 2015	17	(Egypt) Ahmed Ayoub	16 November 2015
Zamalek	(Portugal) Jesualdo Ferreira	Resigned	21 November 2015	4	(Brazil) Marcos Paquetá	13 December 2015
Ittihad El Shorta	(Egypt) Khaled El Kamash	Sacked	26 November 2015	15	(Egypt) Fathi Mabrouk	26 November 2015
Petrojet	(Egypt) Ahmed Hassan	Resigned	11 December 2015	14	(Egypt) Talaat Youssef	12 December 2015
Ismaily	(Egypt) Mido	Resigned	20 December 2015	5	(Tunisia) Nasreddine Nabi	27 December 2015
Ghazl El Mahalla	(Egypt) Ahmed Hassan	Resigned	24 December 2015	18	(Egypt) Mohamed Faiz	1 January 2016
Zamalek	(Brazil) Marcos Paquetá	Sacked	4 January 2016	5	(Egypt) Mido	4 January 2016
ENPPI	(Egypt) Hany Ramzy	Resigned	9 January 2016	11	(Egypt) Hamada Sedki	17 January 2016
Wadi Degla	(Egypt) Hamada Sedki	Resigned	14 January 2016	14	(France) Patrice Carteron	16 January 2016
Al Ahly	(Portugal) José Peseiro	Resigned	18 January 2016	3	(Egypt) Abdul-Aziz Abdul-Shafi	18 January 2016
Al Mokawloon	(Egypt) Tarek El Ashry	Sacked	20 January 2016	15	(Egypt) Mohamed Ouda	22 January 2016
Ghazl El Mahalla	(Egypt) Mohamed Faiz	Sacked	20 January 2016	18	(Egypt) Khaled El Kamash	20 January 2016
Ismaily	(Tunisia) Nasreddine Nabi	Sacked	25 January 2016	11	(Egypt) Khaled El Kamash	26 January 2016
Ghazl El Mahalla	(Egypt) Khaled El Kamash	Signed by Ismaily	26 January 2016	17	(Egypt) Samir Kamouna	2 February 2016
Zamalek	(Egypt) Mido	Sacked	9 February 2016	2	(Egypt) Mohamed Salah	9 February 2016
Ittihad El Shorta	(Egypt) Fathi Mabrouk	Sacked	12 February 2016	16	(Egypt) Hany Ramzy	12 February 2016
Smouha	(Egypt) Mimi Abdel Razek	Resigned	17 February 2016	8	(Egypt) Helmy Toulan	19 February 2016
Zamalek	(Egypt) Mohamed Salah	End of caretaker spell	28 February 2016	2	(Scotland) Alex McLeish	28 February 2016
Al Ahly	(Egypt) Abdul-Aziz Abdul-Shafi	End of caretaker spell	1 March 2016	1	(Netherlands) Martin Jol	1 March 2016
Haras El Hodoud	(Egypt) Ahmed Ayoub	Sacked	1 March 2016	18	(Egypt) Abdul-Hamid Bassiouny	1 March 2016
Al Ittihad	(Portugal) Leonel Pontes	Sacked	8 March 2016	14	(Egypt) Mokhtar Mokhtar	9 March 2016
ENPPI	(Egypt) Hamada Sedki	Sacked	16 April 2016	12	(Egypt) Khaled Metwalli	16 April 2016
El Dakhleya	(Egypt) Alaa Abdel Aal	Resigned	23 April 2016	7	(Egypt) Mohamed Yousry	25 April 2016
ENPPI	(Egypt) Khaled Metwalli	End of caretaker spell	27 April 2016	13	(Egypt) Alaa Abdel Aal	27 April 2016
Zamalek	(Scotland) Alex McLeish	Mutual consent	2 May 2016	2	(Egypt) Mohamed Helmy	2 May 2016

== Results ==
=== League table ===
Pos	Team	Pld	W	D	L	GF	GA	GD	Pts	Qualification or relegation
1	Al Ahly (C)	34	23	7	4	65	24	+41	76	Qualification for the Champions League
2	Zamalek	34	20	9	5	49	25	+24	69	Qualification for the Champions League
3	Smouha	34	13	16	5	45	37	+8	55 (Note: Smouha ahead of Al Masry on head-to-head record; Smouha–Al Masry 1–0, Al Masry–Smouha 1–1.)	Qualification for the Confederation Cup (Note: Since the winners of the 2015–16 Egypt Cup, Zamalek, qualified for African competition based on league position, the spot awarded to the Cup winner (Confederation Cup) was passed to the fourth-placed team which were the next best teams in the table not already qualified for any African competition.)
4	Al Masry	34	13	16	5	50	37	+13	55	Qualification for the Confederation Cup
5	Wadi Degla	34	14	12	8	38	31	+7	54	
6	Ismaily	34	15	8	11	47	36	+11	53	
7	El Entag El Harby	34	13	13	8	38	26	+12	52	
8	El Dakhleya	34	13	11	10	35	33	+2	50	
9	ENPPI	34	12	11	11	42	39	+3	47 (Note: ENPPI ahead of Misr Lel Makkasa on head-to-head record; ENPPI–Misr Lel Makkasa 2–1, Misr Lel Makkasa–ENPPI 0–2.)	
10	Misr Lel Makkasa	34	12	11	11	47	41	+6	47	
11	Petrojet	34	12	10	12	35	31	+4	46	
12	Tala'ea El Gaish	34	9	14	11	34	35	−1	41 (Note: Tala'ea El Gaish ahead of Al Mokawloon on head-to-head record; Tala'ea El Gaish–Al Mokawloon 2–1, Al Mokawloon–Tala'ea El Gaish 0–0.)	
13	Al Mokawloon Al Arab	34	10	11	13	34	42	−8	41	
14	Al Ittihad	34	11	6	17	26	44	−18	39	
15	Aswan	34	8	11	15	28	44	−16	35	
16	Ittihad El Shorta (R)	34	3	16	15	30	48	−18	25	Relegation to the Second Division
17	Haras El Hodoud (R)	34	4	7	23	17	52	−35	19	Relegation to the Second Division
18	Ghazl El Mahalla (R)	34	0	13	21	16	51	−35	13	Relegation to the Second Division

Source: Soccerway
Rules for classification: 1) Points; 2) Head-to-Head points; 3) Head-to-Head goal difference; 4) Head-to-Head goal scored; 5) Head-to-Head away goal scored; 6) Goal difference; 7) Goal scored.
(C) Champions; (R) Relegated

=== Result table ===
Home \ Away	AHL	ASW	DKH	ENT	ENP	GMH	HRS	ISM	ITH	ITS	MAS	MMK	MOK	PET	SMO	TGS	WDG	ZAM
Al Ahly	—	3–1	2–0	2–0	2–0	2–0	3–0	1–0	1–1	7–3	2–3	0–1	3–1	2–0	0–3	1–0	0–1	2–0
Aswan	0–4	—	1–0	0–2	1–1	0–0	1–0	1–1	1–0	2–1	1–1	2–3	2–1	2–1	0–0	0–1	2–1	0–0
El Dakhleya	1–1	1–1	—	2–1	4–4	1–0	2–0	0–1	2–0	1–0	2–3	1–3	2–0	1–0	0–1	0–0	2–0	0–0
El Entag El Harby	0–1	2–0	2–2	—	0–0	1–0	3–0	3–0	0–1	0–0	0–0	2–1	2–1	0–0	1–1	2–1	1–1	3–1
ENPPI	0–2	3–2	0–1	0–0	—	3–0	2–2	1–2	3–0	1–3	0–4	1–1	3–1	1–0	0–1	2–1	0–2	0–1
Ghazl El Mahalla	1–1	0–1	1–1	0–1	0–0	—	0–1	2–2	0–1	0–0	2–2	0–1	0–1	1–1	0–1	1–1	0–2	0–2
Haras El Hodoud	0–4	1–0	0–1	0–3	0–1	2–2	—	0–4	0–1	0–0	3–1	1–1	0–1	0–2	0–1	0–1	0–2	0–2
Ismaily	1–2	2–0	0–1	2–0	2–2	3–1	1–0	—	0–1	2–2	1–1	1–4	1–0	1–0	2–2	2–0	0–1	1–0
Al Ittihad	0–1	1–0	1–2	1–2	1–0	1–1	2–0	0–5	—	1–0	0–2	1–0	1–1	0–2	0–1	1–0	2–3	0–1
Ittihad El Shorta	3–5	2–2	1–1	0–0	0–0	3–0	1–1	2–0	1–1	—	0–1	0–0	2–2	0–1	0–2	1–4	0–0	2–3
Al Masry	2–2	3–2	1–1	0–0	1–2	1–0	3–2	1–0	1–1	1–0	—	1–1	3–2	3–1	1–1	3–3	2–0	0–1
Misr Lel Makkasa	1–2	3–1	0–1	2–1	0–2	1–0	1–0	3–2	1–1	1–1	2–2	—	0–1	0–1	2–0	1–1	1–1	1–3
Al Mokawloon	0–3	2–0	3–1	0–0	0–3	0–0	1–0	0–0	3–1	0–0	2–1	1–4	—	2–2	1–1	0–0	0–0	1–2
Petrojet	0–1	1–1	0–0	3–1	0–0	2–0	1–2	1–0	3–1	3–0	0–0	3–2	0–2	—	3–1	0–0	0–1	1–1
Smouha	1–3	0–0	1–1	1–1	1–1	4–2	2–2	3–3	2–0	1–1	1–0	4–3	0–2	0–3	—	2–2	2–0	1–1
Tala'ea El Gaish	0–0	1–1	2–0	0–0	1–3	2–1	1–0	1–2	0–1	2–0	0–0	0–0	2–1	0–0	0–1	—	0–2	3–2
Wadi Degla	0–0	1–0	1–0	1–3	2–3	1–1	0–0	0–2	3–1	2–1	0–0	1–0	1–1	3–0	1–1	3–3	—	1–1
Zamalek	0–0	1–0	2–0	2–1	1–0	5–0	1–0	0–1	2–1	1–0	2–2	2–2	2–0	2–0	1–1	2–1	2–0	—

Source: Soccerway
Legend: Blue = home team win; Yellow = draw; Red = away team win.

== Season statistics ==
=== Top goalscorers ===
Rank	Scorer	Club	Goals
1	(Egypt) Hossam Salama	Smouha	17
2	(Egypt) Marwan Mohsen	Ismaily	14
2	(Ghana) Nana Poku	Misr Lel Makkasa	14
4	(Egypt) Ahmed Raouf	Al Masry	13
5	(Egypt) Mahmoud Fathalla	El Entag El Harby	12
5	(Gabon) Malick Evouna	Al Ahly	12
5	(Egypt) Moamen Zakaria	Al Ahly	12
8	(Egypt) Abdallah Said	Al Ahly	11
8	(Egypt) Mahmoud Kahraba	Zamalek	11
8	(Nigeria) Stanley Ohawuchi	Wadi Degla	11

=== Hat-tricks ===
Player	Club	Against	Result	Date
(Egypt) Mahmoud Fathalla	El Entag El Harby	Haras El Hodoud	3–0	19 January 2016
(Egypt) Gedo	El Entag El Harby	Ismaily	3–0	11 February 2016
(Egypt) Ahmed Raouf	Al Masry	ENPPI	4–0	1 March 2016

=== Clean Sheets ===
Rank	Player	Club	Clean sheets
1	(Egypt) Sherif Ekramy	Al Ahly	16
2	(Egypt) Essam El-Hadary	Wadi Degla	15
3	(Egypt) Al-Mahdy Soliman (Egypt) Mohamed El Shenawy	Smouha Petrojet	13
4	(Egypt) Amir Abdelhamid (Egypt) Ahmed El-Shenawy (Egypt) Mahmoud El Gharabawy	El Entag El Harby Zamalek El Dakhleya	11
5	(Egypt) Emad Sayed (Egypt) Mohamed Awaad	Tala'ea El Gaish Ismaily	10

Source: yallakora

=== Team's progress ===
Team ╲ Round	1	2	3	4	5	6	7	8	9	10	11	12	13	14	15	16	17	18	19	20	21	22	23	24	25	26	27	28	29	30	31	32	33	34
Al Ahly	W	W	W	L	L	W	D	W	W	W	W	D	W	W	W	W	D	D	D	W	W	W	W	W	W	L	W	W	W	W	L	W	D	D
Aswan	L	D	D	D	D	L	L	W	L	D	L	W	W	L	W	D	D	W	L	L	W	W	L	D	D	D	L	L	D	L	L	L	W	L
El Dakhleya	W	W	W	W	D	D	W	W	D	D	D	L	D	D	L	D	D	L	W	L	W	L	W	D	D	L	W	W	L	L	L	W	L	W
El Entag El Harby	L	L	L	W	W	D	L	D	D	D	D	L	W	W	W	D	D	W	W	W	D	W	L	D	D	D	D	L	D	W	W	W	W	L
ENPPI	D	D	W	D	W	D	W	D	L	L	L	W	W	D	L	D	W	L	W	L	L	L	L	D	W	L	D	D	L	W	W	D	W	W
Ghazl El Mahalla	L	L	L	D	L	D	D	L	L	L	D	D	L	L	L	D	L	L	D	D	L	L	L	L	D	D	L	L	L	D	L	D	L	D
Haras El Hodoud	D	L	D	L	L	L	D	L	L	L	D	D	L	L	L	L	L	L	L	D	L	W	L	L	L	L	L	L	W	W	W	L	D	L
Ismaily	W	D	L	W	W	W	L	L	W	D	L	D	L	L	W	D	L	W	W	W	W	L	W	W	D	W	D	L	L	D	D	L	W	W
Al Ittihad	W	W	D	L	L	W	W	W	L	D	W	D	D	L	L	L	L	L	L	L	L	W	W	W	D	L	L	W	L	W	L	L	D	L
Ittihad El Shorta	D	D	D	L	L	L	D	D	D	D	L	D	L	L	D	D	L	W	D	D	L	D	L	L	D	D	D	L	W	L	L	L	W	L
Al Masry	W	D	L	W	W	D	W	W	D	W	D	W	D	L	D	W	D	D	D	W	W	L	L	D	D	D	L	W	D	W	W	D	D	D
Misr Lel Makkasa	D	D	W	W	D	W	W	W	L	W	D	D	D	W	L	W	D	D	D	L	L	W	L	L	W	W	L	D	L	L	W	L	D	L
Al Mokawloon	L	D	D	L	L	D	W	L	L	D	L	D	L	D	L	D	W	W	L	W	L	D	W	D	W	L	D	W	W	L	D	W	L	W
Petrojet	L	W	L	L	D	D	L	L	W	W	D	D	W	W	W	D	W	D	W	L	L	L	W	D	D	L	W	L	D	D	L	W	L	W
Smouha	W	L	L	D	W	D	D	W	W	D	D	D	D	D	W	D	D	W	L	W	W	D	W	W	L	D	D	D	L	W	D	W	D	W
Tala'ea El Gaish	L	D	D	L	W	D	L	W	W	D	D	D	L	W	D	D	D	L	L	W	D	D	W	L	L	L	W	W	D	D	L	W	D	L
Wadi Degla	L	D	W	W	D	L	L	D	D	L	L	D	W	W	D	W	D	W	L	D	W	W	W	W	D	D	W	W	W	D	D	L	L	W
Zamalek	W	D	W	W	W	L	W	D	D	W	W	W	W	D	L	L	D	W	W	L	W	L	D	W	W	W	W	W	W	W	W	D	D	D

Source: Soccerway
W = Win; D = Draw; L = Lose
