= Tanzania at the Africa Cup of Nations =

Tanzania has only played in five Africa Cup of Nations, in 1980, 2019, 2023, 2025 and 2027. This resulted with Tanzania often struggled in qualifying campaign, and outside the first 1980 edition debut, Tanzania had to wait for 39 years before qualified to another AFCON. The national team's records in the tournament is also not impressive, with five defeats and one lone draw dated from their 1980 debut edition, a 1–1 draw to Ivory Coast.

== Overall record ==
Africa Cup of Nations record
Appearances: 4
Year	Round	Position	Pld	W	D	L	GF	GA
(Sudan) 1957	Did not enter							
(Egypt) 1959	Did not enter							
(Ethiopia) 1962	Did not enter							
(Ghana) 1963	Did not enter							
(Tunisia) 1965	Did not enter							
(Ethiopia) 1968	Withdrew during qualifying							
(Sudan) 1970	Did not qualify							
(Cameroon) 1972	Did not qualify							
(Egypt) 1974	Did not qualify							
(Ethiopia) 1976	Did not qualify							
(Ghana) 1978	Did not qualify							
(Nigeria) 1980	Group stage	7th	3	0	1	2	3	6
(Libya) 1982	Withdrew							
(Ivory Coast) 1984	Did not qualify							
(Egypt) 1986	Withdrew during qualifying							
(Morocco) 1988	Did not qualify							
(Algeria) 1990	Did not qualify							
(Senegal) 1992	Did not qualify							
(Tunisia) 1994	Withdrew during qualifying							
(South Africa) 1996	Did not qualify							
(Burkina Faso) 1998	Did not qualify							
(Ghana) (Nigeria) 2000	Did not qualify							
(Mali) 2002	Did not qualify							
(Tunisia) 2004	Withdrew during qualifying							
(Egypt) 2006	Did not qualify							
(Ghana) 2008	Did not qualify							
(Angola) 2010	Did not qualify							
(Gabon) (Equatorial Guinea) 2012	Did not qualify							
(South Africa) 2013	Did not qualify							
(Equatorial Guinea) 2015	Did not qualify							
(Gabon) 2017	Did not qualify							
(Egypt) 2019	Group stage	24th	3	0	0	3	2	8
(Cameroon) 2021	Did not qualify							
(Ivory Coast) 2023	Group stage	22nd	3	0	2	1	1	4
(Morocco) 2025	Qualified							
(Kenya) (Tanzania) (Uganda) 2027	Qualified as co-hosts							
Total	Group stage	4/35	9	0	3	6	6	18

== Tanzania's AFCON matches ==
=== 1980 ===
8 March 1980 Group stage	Nigeria	3–1	Tanzania	Lagos
	Muda Lawal 11'; Ifeanyi Onyedika 35'; Segun Odegbami 85'	Report	Juma Mkambi 54'	Stadium: Surulere Stadium; Attendance: 80,000; Referee: (Sudan) Suleiman El Naim

12 March 1980 Group stage	Egypt	2–1	Tanzania	Lagos
	Hassan Shehata 32'; Mussad Nur 38'	Report	Thuwein Waziri 86'	Stadium: Surulere Stadium; Attendance: 55,000; Referee: (Mauritius) Sohan Ramlochun

15 March 1980 Group stage	Ivory Coast	1–1	Tanzania	Lagos
	Kobenan Koma 7'	Report	Thuwein Waziri 59'	Stadium: Surulere Stadium; Attendance: 70,000; Referee: (Cameroon) Diallo Bakaï

=== 2019 ===
Pos	Team	Pld	W	D	L	GF	GA	GD	Pts	Qualification
1	Algeria	3	3	0	0	6	0	+6	9	Advance to knockout stage
2	Senegal	3	2	0	1	5	1	+4	6	Advance to knockout stage
3	Kenya	3	1	0	2	3	7	−4	3	
4	Tanzania	3	0	0	3	2	8	−6	0	

Source: CAF
Rules for classification: Tiebreakers

23 June 2019 Group stage	Senegal	2–0	Tanzania	Cairo
19:00	Keita Baldé 28'; Krépin Diatta 64'	Report		Stadium: 30 June Stadium; Attendance: 7,249; Referee: (Tunisia) Sadok Selmi

27 June 2019 Group stage	Kenya	3–2	Tanzania	Cairo
22:00	Michael Olunga 39', 80'; Johanna Omolo 62'	Report	Simon Msuva 6'; Mbwana Samatta 40'	Stadium: 30 June Stadium; Attendance: 7,233; Referee: (Mauritius) Ahmad Heeralall

1 July 2019 Group stage	Tanzania	0–3	Algeria	Cairo
21:00		Report	Islam Slimani 35'; Adam Ounas 39', 45+1'	Stadium: Al Salam Stadium; Attendance: 8,921; Referee: (Madagascar) Andofetra Rakotojaona

=== 2023 ===
Pos	Team	Pld	W	D	L	GF	GA	GD	Pts	Qualification
1	Morocco	3	2	1	0	5	1	+4	7	Advance to knockout stage
2	DR Congo	3	0	3	0	2	2	0	3	Advance to knockout stage
3	Zambia	3	0	2	1	2	3	−1	2 (Note: Tied on head-to-head points. Overall goal difference: Zambia −1, Tanzania −3.)	
4	Tanzania	3	0	2	1	1	4	−3	2	

Source: CAF
Rules for classification: Group stage tiebreakers
Notes:

17 January 2024 Group stage	Morocco	3–0	Tanzania	San-Pédro
17:00	Romain Saïss 30'; Azzedine Ounahi 77'; Youssef En-Nesyri 80'	Report		Stadium: Laurent Pokou Stadium; Attendance: 15,478; Referee: (Chad) Alhadj Allaou Mahamat

21 January 2024 Group stage	Zambia	1–1	Tanzania	San-Pédro
17:00	Patson Daka 88'	Report	Simon Msuva 11'	Stadium: Laurent Pokou Stadium; Attendance: 13,342; Referee: (Benin) Djindo Louis Houngnandande

24 January 2024 Group stage	Tanzania	0–0	DR Congo	Korhogo
20:00		Report		Stadium: Amadou Gon Coulibaly Stadium; Attendance: 12,847; Referee: (Egypt) Amin Omar
