= List of Al Ahly SC managers =

Al Ahly Football Club (Arabic: النادي الأهلي للرياضة البدنية), commonly referred to as Al Ahly, is an Egyptian professional football club based in Cairo which plays in the Egyptian Premier League. Here is a list of managers who coached the club.

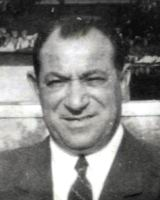
Mokhtar El-Tetsh led Al Ahly to win the first championship in the club's history as a player and also led them to win their first ever league title as a manager

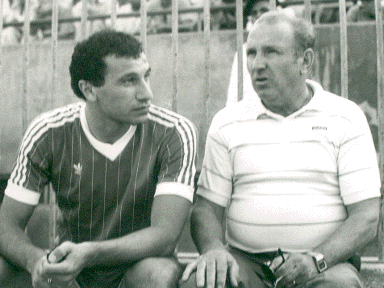
Nándor Hidegkuti won 5 league titles with the club

Name	Nat.	From	To	Honours
Gamil Osman	(Egypt)	1926	?	9 Cairo League 7 Egypt Cup 2 Sultan Hussein Cup
Mahmoud Mokhtar El-Tetsh	(Egypt)	?	?	?
Labib Mahmoud	(Egypt)	?	?	?
Hussein El-Far	(Egypt)	?	?	?
Mohamed El-Guindi	(Egypt)	?	?	?
Mustafa Kamel Mansour	(Egypt)	?	?	?
Fouad Sedki	(Egypt)	?	?	?
Ahmed Mekawi	(Egypt)	?	?	?
Mohamed Abdou Saleh El-Wahsh	(Egypt)	?	?	?
Abdel Aziz Hammami	(Egypt)	?	?	?
Fouad Shaaban	(Egypt)	?	?	?
Curtis Booth	(England)	?	?	?
Friedrich Pimperl	(Austria)	1955	1957	2 Egyptian Premier League; 1 Egypt Cup
Pál Titkos	(Hungary)	1957	1958	1 Egyptian Premier League; 1 Egypt Cup
John McBride	(Scotland)	1959	1961	1 Egyptian Premier League
Ljubiša Broćić	(Socialist Federal Republic of Yugoslavia)	?	?	?
Ivan Horvatić	(Socialist Federal Republic of Yugoslavia)	?	?	?
Zoran Tadić	(Socialist Federal Republic of Yugoslavia)	?	?	?
Nándor Hidegkuti	(Hungary)	1973	1980	5 Egyptian Premier League; 1 Egypt Cup
Géza Kalocsay	(Hungary)	1980	1982	1 Egyptian Premier League; 1 Egypt Cup
Mahmoud El-Gohary	(Egypt)	1982	1984	1 CAF Champions League; 2 Egypt Cup
Don Revie	(England)	1 July 1984	7 November 1984	1 Egyptian Premier League
Mahmoud El-Sayes	(Egypt)	8 November 1984	31 May 1985	1 Egyptian Premier League; 1 Egypt Cup; 1 African Cup Winners' Cup
Mahmoud El-Gohary	(Egypt)	31 May 1985	30 June 1986	1 Egyptian Premier League; 1 African Cup Winners' Cup
Taha Ismail	(Egypt)	1986	July 1987	1 Egyptian Premier League; 1 African Cup Winners' Cup
Jeff Butler	(England)	July 1987	December 1987	
Anwar Salama	(Egypt)	December 1987	1988	1 CAF Champions League
Dietrich Weise	(Germany)	1988	1989	1 Egyptian Premier League; 1 Egypt Cup; 1 Afro-Asian Club Championship
Mahmoud El-Sayes	(Egypt)	1989	1991	1 Egypt Cup
Michael Everitt	(England)	1991	1991	
Anwar Salama	(Egypt)	1991	1993	1 Egypt Cup
Allan Harris	(England)	1 July 1993	30 June 1995	2 Egyptian Premier League; 1 Arab Club Champions Cup; 1 African Cup Winners' Cup
Reiner Hollmann	(Germany)	1 July 1995	30 November 1997	2 Egyptian Premier League; 1 Arab Cup Winners' Cup; 1 Egypt Cup; 1 Arab Super Cup
Rainer Zobel	(Germany)	1998	31 August 2000	3 Egyptian Premier League; 2 Arab Super Cup
Hans-Jürgen Dörner	(Germany)	14 October 2000	30 June 2001	1 Egypt Cup
Manuel José	(Portugal)	July 2001	May 2002	1 CAF Champions League; 1 CAF Super Cup
Jo Bonfrère	(Netherlands)	1 July 2002	2002	
Toni Oliveira	(Portugal)	1 January 2003	30 June 2003	1 Egyptian Super Cup
Manuel José	(Portugal)	1 January 2004	22 June 2009	5 Egyptian Premier League; 2 Egypt Cup; 4 Egyptian Super Cup; 3 CAF Champions League; 3 CAF Super Cup
Hossam El Badry	(Egypt)	22 June 2009	22 November 2010	1 Egyptian Premier League; 1 Egyptian Super Cup
Abdul-Aziz Abdul-Shafi (caretaker)	(Egypt)	23 November 2010	31 December 2010	
Manuel José	(Portugal)	31 December 2010	19 May 2012	1 Egyptian Premier League
Hossam El Badry	(Egypt)	21 May 2012	6 May 2013	1 CAF Champions League; 1 CAF Super Cup
Mohamed Youssef	(Egypt)	29 April 2013	30 April 2014	1 CAF Champions League; 1 CAF Super Cup
Fathi Mabrouk	(Egypt)	1 May 2014	7 July 2014	1 Egyptian Premier League
Juan Carlos Garrido	(Spain)	8 July 2014	3 May 2015	1 CAF Confederation Cup; 1 Egyptian Super Cup
Fathi Mabrouk	(Egypt)	4 May 2015	5 October 2015	
Abdul-Aziz Abdul-Shafi (caretaker)	(Egypt)	5 October 2015	15 October 2015	1 Egyptian Super Cup
José Peseiro	(Portugal)	16 October 2015	18 January 2016	
Abdul-Aziz Abdul-Shafi (caretaker)	(Egypt)	18 January 2016	27 February 2016	
Martin Jol	(Netherlands)	28 February 2016	22 August 2016	1 Egyptian Premier League
Hossam El Badry	(Egypt)	24 August 2016	15 May 2018	1 Egyptian Premier League; 1 Egyptian Super Cup; 1 Egypt Cup
Ahmed Ayoub (caretaker)	(Egypt)	15 May 2018	11 June 2018	
Patrice Carteron	(France)	12 June 2018	22 November 2018	
Mohamed Youssef (caretaker)	(Egypt)	22 November 2018	29 December 2018	
Martín Lasarte	(Uruguay)	30 December 2018	17 August 2019	1 Egyptian Premier League
Mohamed Youssef (caretaker)	(Egypt)	18 August 2019	31 August 2019	
René Weiler	(Switzerland)	31 August 2019	30 September 2020	1 Egyptian Premier League; 1 Egyptian Super Cup
Pitso Mosimane	(South Africa)	30 September 2020	13 June 2022	2 CAF Champions League; 2 CAF Super Cup; 1 Egyptian Premier League; 1 Egypt Cup
Samy Komsan (caretaker)	(Egypt)	13 June 2022	29 June 2022	
Ricardo Soares	(Portugal)	30 June 2022	31 August 2022	
Marcel Koller	(Switzerland)	9 September 2022	26 April 2025	2 Egyptian Premier League; 2 CAF Champions League; 2 Egypt Cup; 4 Egypt Super Cup; 1 FIFA African-Asian-Pacific Cup
Emad El Nahhas (caretaker)	(Egypt)	26 April 2025	29 May 2025	1 Egyptian Premier League
José Riveiro	(Spain)	29 May 2025	31 August 2025	
Emad El Nahhas (caretaker)	(Egypt)	31 August 2025	8 October 2025	
Jess Thorup	(Denmark)	8 October 2025	4 June 2026	1 Egyptian Super Cup
Hussein Ammouta	(Morocco)	15 June 2026	Current	

Notes

- Note 1: Fathi Mabrouk was an interim manager 5 times.
- Note 2: Manuel José and Hossam El-Badry are the only 3 term managers in Al-Ahly history.
- Note 3: A. Abdul-Shafi was an interim manager 3 times.
