= 1980 African Cup of Nations =

12th edition of the Africa Cup of Nations

Tournament details
- Host country: Nigeria
- Dates: 8−22 March
- Teams: 8
- Venues: 2 (in 2 host cities)

Final positions
- Champions: Nigeria (1st title)
- Runners-up: Algeria
- Third place: Morocco
- Fourth place: Egypt

Tournament statistics
- Matches played: 16
- Goals scored: 33 (2.06 per match)
- Top scorer(s): (Morocco) Khalid Labied (Nigeria) Segun Odegbami (3 goals each)
- Best player: (Nigeria) Christian Chukwu

The 1980 African Cup of Nations was the 12th edition of the African Cup of Nations, the international football championship run by the Confederation of African Football (CAF). It was hosted by Nigeria. Just like in 1978, the field of eight teams was split into two groups of four. Hosts Nigeria won a first championship, beating Algeria 3−0 in the final.

== Qualified teams ==
Participating nations

The 8 qualified teams are:

Team	Qualified as	Qualified on	Previous appearances in tournament (Note: Bold indicates champion for that year, Italic indicates host.)
Nigeria	Hosts		3 (1963, 1976, 1978)
Ghana	Holders	16 March 1978	5 (**1963**, **1965**, 1968, 1970, **1978**)
Ivory Coast	2nd round winners	6 July 1979	4 (1965, 1968, 1970, 1974)
Morocco	2nd round winners	6 July 1979	3 (1972, **1976**, 1978)
Algeria	2nd round winners	8 July 1979	1 (1968)
Egypt	2nd round winners	13 July 1979	7 (**1957**, **1959**, 1962, 1963, 1970, 1974, 1976)
Guinea	2nd round winners	19 August 1979	3 (1970, 1974, 1976)
Tanzania	2nd round winners	26 August 1979	0 (debut)

== Venues ==
The competition was played in two venues in Lagos and Ibadan.

Lagos	1980 African Cup of Nations is located in Nigeria
Surulere Stadium	1980 African Cup of Nations is located in Nigeria
Capacity: **80,000**	1980 African Cup of Nations is located in Nigeria
Ibadan	1980 African Cup of Nations is located in Nigeria
Liberty Stadium	1980 African Cup of Nations is located in Nigeria
Capacity: **35,000**	1980 African Cup of Nations is located in Nigeria

== Group stage ==
=== Tiebreakers ===
If two or more teams finished level on points after completion of the group matches, the following tie-breakers were used to determine the final ranking:

1. Goal difference in all group matches
2. Greater number of goals scored in all group matches
3. Drawing of lots

=== Group A ===
Pos	Team	Pld	W	D	L	GF	GA	GD	Pts	Qualification
1	Nigeria (H)	3	2	1	0	4	1	+3	**5**	Advance to Knockout stage
2	Egypt	3	2	0	1	4	3	+1	**4**	Advance to Knockout stage
3	Ivory Coast	3	0	2	1	2	3	−1	**2**	
4	Tanzania	3	0	1	2	3	6	−3	**1**	

Rules for classification: Group stage tiebreakers
(H) Hosts
8 March 1980

Nigeria	3–1	Tanzania
Lawal 11'; Onyedika 35'; Odegbami 85'	Report	Mkambi 54'

Surulere Stadium, Lagos
Attendance: 80,000
Referee: Suleiman El Naim (Sudan)
8 March 1980

Egypt	2–1	Ivory Coast
Hammam 8'; Mokhtar 20'	Report	Gome 7'

Surulere Stadium, Lagos
Attendance: 80,000
Referee: Joel Mondoka (Zambia)

12 March 1980

Egypt	2–1	Tanzania
Shehata 32'; Nour 38'	Report	Waziri 86'

Surulere Stadium, Lagos
Attendance: 55,000
Referee: Sohan Ramlochun (Mauritius)
12 March 1980

Nigeria	0–0	Ivory Coast
	Report

Surulere Stadium, Lagos
Attendance: 55,000
Referee: Théophile Lawson-Hétchéli (Togo)

15 March 1980

Ivory Coast	1–1	Tanzania
Koma 7'	Report	Waziri 59'

Surulere Stadium, Lagos
Attendance: 70,000
Referee: Diallo Bakaï (Cameroon)
15 March 1980

Nigeria	1–0	Egypt
Isima 15'	Report

Surulere Stadium, Lagos
Attendance: 70,000
Referee: Tesfaye Gebreyesus (Ethiopia)

=== Group B ===
Pos	Team	Pld	W	D	L	GF	GA	GD	Pts	Qualification
1	Algeria	3	2	1	0	4	2	+2	**5**	Advance to Knockout stage
2	Morocco	3	1	1	1	2	2	0	**3**	Advance to Knockout stage
3	Ghana	3	1	1	1	1	1	0	**3**	
4	Guinea	3	0	1	2	3	5	−2	**1**	

Rules for classification: Group stage tiebreakers
9 March 1980

Ghana	0–0	Algeria
	Report

Liberty Stadium, Ibadan
Attendance: 40,000
Referee: Youssef El Ghoul (Libya)
9 March 1980

Morocco	1–1	Guinea
Tahiri 7'	Report	M. Camara 8'

Liberty Stadium, Ibadan
Attendance: 40,000
Referee: Paul Preira (Senegal)

13 March 1980

Algeria	1–0	Morocco
Belloumi 90+3'	Report

Liberty Stadium, Ibadan
Attendance: 20,000
Referee: Ali Dridi (Tunisia)
13 March 1980

Ghana	1–0	Guinea
Klutse 69'	Report

Liberty Stadium, Ibadan
Attendance: 20,000
Referee: Ngesa Gabriel Odengo (Kenya)

16 March 1980

Algeria	3–2	Guinea
Bensaoula 12', 49'; Belloumi 37'	Report	Diawara 82'; Bangoura 90+1'

Liberty Stadium, Ibadan
Attendance: 20,000
Referee: Idrissa Traoré (Mali)
16 March 1980

Morocco	1–0	Ghana
Labied 44'	Report

Liberty Stadium, Ibadan
Attendance: 20,000
Referee: Dodou N'Jie (Gambia)

== Knockout stage ==
=== Bracket ===
Semi-finals
19 March – Lagos
**Nigeria**	**1**
Morocco	0
19 March – Ibadan
**Algeria (pen.)**	**2 (4)**
Egypt	2 (2)

Final
22 March – Lagos
**Nigeria**	**3**
Algeria	0
Third place
21 March – Lagos
**Morocco**	**2**
Egypt	0

=== Semi-finals ===
19 March 1980

Nigeria	1–0	Morocco
Owolabi 9'	Report

Surulere Stadium, Lagos
Attendance: 70,000
Referee: Suleiman El Naim (Sudan)

19 March 1980

Algeria	2–2	Egypt
Assad 55' (pen.); Benmiloudi 62'	Report	El Khatib 32'; El Sayed 47'
Penalties
Belloumi (penalty scored); Fergani (penalty scored); Khedis (penalty scored); Larbès (penalty missed); Assad (penalty scored)	4–2	(penalty scored) Shehata; (penalty scored) Mokhtar; (penalty missed) El Khatib; (penalty missed) Amer

Liberty Stadium, Ibadan
Attendance: 5,000
Referee: Théophile Lawson-Hétchéli (Togo)

=== Third place match ===
21 March 1980

Morocco	2–0	Egypt
Labied 9', 78'	Report

Surulere Stadium, Lagos
Attendance: 5,000
Referee: Ngesa Gabriel Odengo (Kenya)

=== Final ===
22 March 1980

Nigeria	3–0	Algeria
Odegbami 2', 42'; Lawal 50'	Report

Surulere Stadium, Lagos
Attendance: 85,000
Referee: Tesfaye Gebreyesus (Ethiopia)

== Goalscorers ==
There were 33 goals scored in 16 matches, for an average of 2.06 goals per match.

3 goals

- (Morocco) Khalid Labied
- (Nigeria) Segun Odegbami

2 goals

- (Algeria) Lakhdar Belloumi
- (Algeria) Tedj Bensaoula
- (Nigeria) Muda Lawal
- (Tanzania) Thuwein Waziri

1 goal

- (Algeria) Salah Assad
- (Algeria) Hocine Benmiloudi
- (Egypt) Mahmoud El Khatib
- (Egypt) Ramadan El Sayed
- (Egypt) Maher Hammam
- (Egypt) Mokhtar Mokhtar
- (Egypt) Mosaad Nour
- (Egypt) Hassan Shehata
- (Ghana) Willie Klutse
- (Guinea) Moussa Camara
- (Guinea) Ibrahima Diawara
- (Guinea) Sidouba Bangoura.
- (Ivory Coast) Ani Gome
- (Ivory Coast) Kouman Kobenan
- (Morocco) Mustapha Tahiri
- (Nigeria) Okey Isima
- (Nigeria) Ifeanyi Onyedika
- (Nigeria) Felix Owolabi
- (Tanzania) Juma Mkambi

== Team of the Tournament ==
Goalkeeper	Defenders	Midfielders	Forwards
(Nigeria) Best Ogedegbe	(Algeria) Mustapha Kouici (Egypt) Mohamed Salah El-Din (Guinea) Moussa Camara (Nigeria) Christian Chukwu	(Algeria) Lakhdar Belloumi (Algeria) Ali Fergani (Egypt) Mahmoud El Khatib (Egypt) Shawky Gharieb	(Algeria) Salah Assad (Nigeria) Segun Odegbami
