= Hocine Benmiloudi =

Algerian footballer (1955-1981)

Personal information
- Date of birth: 31 January 1955
- Place of birth: El Madania, Algiers, Algeria
- Date of death: 5 November 1981 (aged 26)
- Place of death: Algiers, Algeria
- Position: Forward

Youth career
- IRB Madania
- 1971–1973: CR Belouizdad

Senior career*
Years	Team	Apps	(Gls)
1973–1981	CR Belouizdad	-	(-)

International career
1979–1980	Algeria	6	(2)
- * Club domestic league appearances and goals

Hocine Benmiloudi (31 January 1955 – 5 November 1981) was an Algerian football forward who played for Algeria in the 1980 African Cup of Nations.

== Biography ==
Benmiloudi was born to an Algerian mother and a Moroccan emigrant father in El Madania, Algiers, where he began playing football. In 1971, he joined the youth team CR Belouizdad. He died at the age of 26 on 5 November 1981, during the Ligue 1 match against USM Aïn Beïda in Stade 20 Août 1955 (Algiers), from severe food poisoning.

== Honours ==
=== Club ===
- Winner of the Algerian Cup in 1978

=== National team ===
- Runner-up in the 1980 African Cup of Nations in Nigeria
