= Jones Chilengi =

Zambian footballer and coach (1955-1999)

Personal information
- Date of birth: 30 January 1955
- Place of birth: Northern Rhodesia
- Date of death: 9 April 1999 (aged 44)
- Place of death: Hwange, Zimbabwe
- Position: Defender

Senior career*
Years	Team	Apps	(Gls)
1975–1987	Green Buffaloes		

International career
1983–1993	Zambia	108	(0)

Managerial career
- 1988: Nitrogen Chemicals F.C.
- 1989–1991: Ndola United F.C.
- 1992–1995: Zamsure F.C.
- 1996–1999: Hwange F.C.
- * Club domestic league appearances and goals

Jones Chilengi (30 January 1955 – 9 April 1999) was a Zambian footballer and coach. He played as a defender for Zambian club Green Buffaloes and captained Zambia to their first ever regional cup success at CECAFA 1984 in Uganda. He later coached Ndola United, Zamsure and Hwange F.C. of Zimbabwe.

== Playing career ==
Chilengi first featured for Buffaloes in 1976 where he was mainly a reserve defender to the club's first choice central defensive pairing of Dick Chama and Robert Lutoba. When Chama retired at the end of the season, Chilengi established himself in the team as a central defender. He won the 4 Challenge Cups, 2 Champion of Champion trophies, 2 Heroes and Unity Cups and the league title in 1977, 1979 and 1981 with Buffaloes and soon got a call-up to the national team, making his debut at CECAFA 1981. He was initially part of the final squad at CAN 1982 but was sent home for disciplinary reasons.

== National team ==
The towering defender who stood over six feet tall could also play in midfield and he weighed in with a fair number of goals. He was quite accurate from the penalty spot, often pointing to one side before taking his kick, which served to confuse the goalkeeper.

He bounced back the following year and established himself as Zambia's first choice centre-back. He succeeded Emmy Musonda as Zambian captain and made history by leading Zambia to their first-ever CECAFA Cup success in Uganda. Chilengi scored a penalty in the 1–1 draw against the hosts in the group stage and in the final against Malawi, he had the chance to score again from the spot when Zambia were awarded a penalty five minutes from time. He failed to beat Malawian goalkeeper John Dzimbiri who had seen him score the penalty against Uganda and dived in the same direction, and the match went into extra-time and then penalties where Zambia carried the day 3–0 after Efford Chabala made two vital stops.

Back home, Chilengi faced undue criticism for the penalty miss and claimed he would have been forced into early retirement had Zambia failed to win the trophy. "Knowing my fellow countrymen, it would have been a sing-song and possibly a cause for ones' suicide," he said.

In April 1985, Zambia faced Cameroon in a World Cup qualifier in Lusaka and Chilengi led them to a 4–1 romp. When the Zambians travelled to Yaounde in two weeks time, the Lions recalled all their big names such as Roger Milla and Louis Mfede with the locals predicting a 6–0 white-wash. To the dismay of a packed Stade Ahmadu Adhijo, Zambia took the lead when Chilengi thundered homen a 7th minute free-kick. Although Mfede equalised in the 31st minute through another free-kick, the Zambians defended comfortably and saw out the tie on a 6–2 aggregate. Afterwards, Chilengi said football is about trying your luck sometimes and he did just that and it went in.

He then led the Zambian team to CAN 1986 in Egypt where Zambia narrowly lost the first game 3–2 to Cameroon, drew 0–0 with Algeria and went into the last game against Morocco needing a win to advance from the group. However, Merry Abdel Karim's goal, which went in after a deflection off Chilengi put paid to Zambia's hopes.

Once again, Chilengi bore the brunt of fans' criticism and decided to quit football after some fans went as far as making abusive phone calls to his wife Annie. After talking to his family and top officials from Buffaloes' sponsors Zambia Army, Chilengi rescinded his decision and decided to go back to the pitch to 'face more insults,' as he called it. He stated that he had about two more years before he could hang up his boots.

However, Chilengi never played for Zambia again though he continued at Buffaloes, leading them to the last-ever cup final that was played at Dag Hammarskjoeld Stadium, the Heroes & Unity Cup final which Buffaloes won after beating Mufulira Wanderers 2–0 in September 1986. He retired from football at the end of the 1987 season and took up coaching.

== Coaching career ==
Chilengi first cut his coaching teeth with Zambian Division I side Nitrogen Chemicals of Kafue in 1988 but left them after a season to join Ndola United, on the promise of a coaching course abroad. He turned around the fortunes of United, leading them to a top five finish in 1989 before leaving to join the emerging Premier League side Zamsure F.C. which was on the ascendency. He succeeded in transforming Zamsure into a formidable force in the league, leading them to two runner-up slots. He stayed with Zamsure until 1995 after which he moved to Zimbabwean side Hwange FC and was voted Coach of the Year in 1997.

In October 1998, Chilengi watched as Zambia struggled at home against Congo DR in a 1–1 draw under Fighton Simukonda in a Nations Cup qualifier and offered to coach the Zambian team for free, saying that he could put together a formidable side. The Football Association of Zambia (FAZ) did not take up his offer but opted for Ben Bamfuchile instead.

== Death ==
Chilengi was still coaching Hwange FC when he fell ill and died after a short illness on 9 April 1999, from haemorrhagic shock in Hwange. He was survived by a wife Anne and four children. One of Zambia's greatest defenders was eulogised as a great trainer and a patriot.
