= Mohamed Abdallah =

Sudanese professor and footballer

Personal information
- Full name: Mohamed Abdallah Ahmed

International career
Years	Team	Apps	(Gls)
- Sudan

Managerial career
- 2008: Sudan
- 2010–2017: Sudan
Medal record
Men's football
Representing Sudan (as manager)
African Nations Championship
Third place	2011 Sudan
CECAFA Cup
Runner-up	2013 Kenya
Third place	2011 Tanzania

Mohamed Abdallah Ahmed nicknamed Mazda, is a Sudanese football coach, former player and the former manager of the national side. Abdallah was in charge at the 2012 Africa Cup of Nations, guiding them to the quarterfinals of the tournament.

Abdallah, a university professor, had previously been captain of the Sudanese national team. As a player, he was involved in the 1974 and 1986 FIFA World Cup qualifying campaigns.

== Honours ==
=== Manager ===
Sudan

- African Nations Championship: 3rd place, 2011
- CECAFA Cup: runner-up, 2013; 3rd place, 2011
