= Moussa Camara (defender) =

Guinean footballer

Personal information
- Place of birth: Guinea
- Position: Defender

Senior career*
Years	Team	Apps	(Gls)
1977	Hafia		

International career
1976–1983	Guinea	9	(2)
- * Club domestic league appearances and goals

Moussa Camara is a Guinean former footballer who played as a defender. He played for the Guinea national team at the 1980 African Cup of Nations, where he scored one goal in three games and was included in the Team of the Tournament.

== Club career ==
He played for Hafia in 1977.

== International career ==
Camara scored a goal in Guinea's opening group game at the 1980 African Cup of Nations, a 1–1 draw against Morocco on 9 March 1980. He participated in Syli National's following two matches in the competition.

== Honours ==
Individual

- African Cup of Nations Team of the Tournament: 1980
