= El Hawamdeya =

Egyptian city

El Hawamdeya الحوامدية
- City
- Interactive map of El Hawamdeya
- Coordinates: 29°54′N 31°16′E
- Country: Egypt
- Governorate: Giza

Area
  - Total: 10.4 km^{2} (4.0 sq mi)

Population (2023)
  - Total: 158,278
  - Density: 15,200/km^{2} (39,400/sq mi)
- Time zone: UTC+2 (EET)
  - Summer (DST): UTC+3 (EEST)

El Hawamdeya (Arabic: الحوامدية, Egyptian Arabic pronunciation: [el.ħæwæmˈdejjæ]) is a city in the Giza Governorate of Egypt.

Successive census results indicate a considerable steady rise in its population: 73,298 in 1986, 91,770 in 1996, 109,314 in 2006, 149,567 in 2018 and 158,278 in 2023.

== Geography ==
El Hawamdeya lies in the south of the Giza Governorate and overlooks the Nile River.

=== Climate ===
Köppen-Geiger climate classification system classifies its climate as hot desert (BWh).

Climate data for El Hawamdeya
Month	Jan	Feb	Mar	Apr	May	Jun	Jul	Aug	Sep	Oct	Nov	Dec	Year
Mean daily maximum °C (°F)	19.5 (67.1)	21.1 (70.0)	24.5 (76.1)	29 (84)	33 (91)	35.3 (95.5)	35.5 (95.9)	35.2 (95.4)	32.9 (91.2)	30.6 (87.1)	25.9 (78.6)	21.4 (70.5)	28.7 (83.5)
Daily mean °C (°F)	13.5 (56.3)	14.5 (58.1)	17.6 (63.7)	21.1 (70.0)	24.9 (76.8)	27.6 (81.7)	28.4 (83.1)	28.3 (82.9)	26.3 (79.3)	24 (75)	19.9 (67.8)	15.5 (59.9)	21.8 (71.2)
Mean daily minimum °C (°F)	7.6 (45.7)	8 (46)	10.8 (51.4)	13.3 (55.9)	16.9 (62.4)	20 (68)	21.3 (70.3)	21.4 (70.5)	19.7 (67.5)	17.5 (63.5)	13.9 (57.0)	9.6 (49.3)	15.0 (59.0)
Average precipitation mm (inches)	4 (0.2)	3 (0.1)	2 (0.1)	1 (0.0)	0 (0)	0 (0)	0 (0)	0 (0)	0 (0)	0 (0)	2 (0.1)	4 (0.2)	16 (0.7)
Source: Climate-Data.org

== Education ==
There are several schools in the city:

- Omar Ibn El Khatab language school
- El Hawamdeya Primary School
- Bebars Primary School
- Bebars Preparatory School
- Arab El Saha School
- El Hawamdeya Preparatory School
- Mona El Amir Primary School
- El Hawamdeya Secondary School
- Zikry Idris Primary School
- El Sheikh Etman Primary School
- Al Azhary Religious Institute (boys)
- Al Azhary Religious Institute (girls)

== Religion ==
=== Islam ===
The city houses several mosques, including:

- Mohammed Ahmed Abd El Salam Mosque (El Gomhoriah St.)
- Ashab El Yameen Mosque (Saad Zagloul St.)
- Al-Tawhid Mosque

=== Christianity ===
The city contains one of the oldest churches in Egypt; Church of Prince Tadros El Shabaty.

== Clubs ==
- El Saha El Shabeya
- Sherket El Sokar
- Om Khanan
- El Sheikh Othman
- Markaz Shabab Mona El Amir

== Notable people ==
- Thabet El-Batal, an Egyptian international goalkeeper.
- Alaa Mayhoub, an Egyptian international and Al-Ahly Midfielder.
