= Yisa Sofoluwe =

Nigerian footballer (1967–2021)

Personal information
- Date of birth: 28 December 1967
- Place of birth: Abeokuta, Nigeria
- Date of death: 9 February 2021 (aged 53)
- Position: Defender

Senior career*
| Years | Team | Apps | (Gls) |
| 1982–1983 | Shooting Stars S.C. | | |
| 1984–1987 | Abiola Babes F.C. | | |
| 1988 | Julius Berger F.C. | | |
| 1988–1989 | KRC Genk | | |
| 1989–1993 | RFC Namur | | |
| 1993–1994 | Union Hutoise | | |
| 1994–1996 | FC Lessines-Ollignies | | |
| 1999–2000 | Gateway United F.C. | | |

International career
| 1983–1988 | Nigeria | 44 | (1) |
- * Club domestic league appearances and goals

Yisa Sofoluwe (28 December 1967 – 9 February 2021) was a Nigerian professional footballer who played as a defender. He won 40 caps and scored one goal for Nigeria, and was their regular left back between 1983 and 1988, playing at the 1984 and 1988 African Nations Cups.

Born in Abeokuta, Sofoluwe played for defunct Abiola Babes of Abeokuta, IICC of Ibadan and Gateway United F.C. of Abeokuta.

He held sway in the right back position between 1983 and 1988, playing at the 1984 and 1988 African Cup of Nations in Côte d’Ivoire and Morocco respectively.

Yisa Sofoluwe died of COVID-19 at the Lagos University Teaching Hospital (LUTH) in Lagos on 9 February 2021, amid the COVID-19 pandemic in Nigeria. He was 53 years old.
