= Okey Isima =

Nigerian footballer

Personal information
- Full name: Okechukwu Emmanuel Isima
- Date of birth: 24 August 1956
- Place of birth: Kano, Nigeria
- Date of death: 18 February 2013 (aged 56)
- Place of death: Nigeria
- Position: Defender

Senior career*
Years	Team	Apps	(Gls)
1978-1982	Enugu Rangers	-	(-)
1982-1983	CF Os Belenenses	-	(-)
1983-1984	CF Uniao	-	(-)
1984-1985	Vitória SC	-	(-)
1985-1986	Sporting Covilhã	-	(-)
1986-1987	CF Estrela Amadora	-	(-)
1987-1988	CD Cova da Piedade	-	(-)

International career
1978–1985	Nigeria	20	(3)
- * Club domestic league appearances and goals

Okey Isima (24 August 1956 – 18 February 2013) was a Nigerian football defender who played for Nigeria in the 1980 Summer Olympics and in the 1980 African Cup of Nations.

== Personal life ==
The seventh of ten children, Isima and his wife lived in Atlanta and had four children.
