= Khalid Labied =

Moroccan footballer

Personal information
- Full name: Khalid Labied
- Date of birth: 24 August 1955 (age 71)
- Place of birth: Rabat, Morocco
- Position: Midfielder

Youth career
- 1973–1974: Fath US

Senior career*
Years	Team	Apps	(Gls)
1974–1991	Fath US	–	(–)
1991–1993	Shabab Al Ahli	–	(–)

International career
1977–1986	Morocco	–	(–)
Medal record
Representing Morocco
Africa Cup of Nations
Third place	1980 Nigeria
- * Club domestic league appearances and goals

Khalid Labied (born 24 August 1955) was a Moroccan footballer who played as a midfielder essentially for Fath US as well as the Moroccan national team.

== Honours ==
=== Player ===
Fath US

- Moroccan Championship: 1980–81
- Throne Cup: 1975–76

Morocco

- Africa Cup of Nations: Third 1980
- Mediterranean Games: Gold medal 1983
- Arab Games: Silver medal 1985

=== Individual ===
- Africa Cup of Nations goalscorer: 1980 (with S. Odegbami) with 3 goals
