= Mustapha Tahiri =

Moroccan footballer (1953–2025)

Personal information
- Date of birth: 1 January 1953
- Place of birth: Jerada, Morocco
- Date of death: 11 August 2025 (aged 72)
- Position: Defender

Youth career
- –1969: MC Oujda

Senior career*
Years	Team	Apps	(Gls)
1969–1979	MC Oujda		
1979–1980	US Sidi Kacem		
1980–1981	RS Berkane		
1981–1984	USM Oujda		

International career
1976–1980	Morocco	20	(2)
Medal record
Representing Morocco
Africa Cup of Nations
Third place	1980 Nigeria
- * Club domestic league appearances and goals

Mustapha Tahiri (Arabic: مصطفى الطاهري; 1 January 1953 – 11 August 2025) was a Moroccan footballer who played as a defender for MC Oujda and the Morocco national team.

== Career ==
Tahiri was born in 1953 in Jerada, Morocco, near Oujda from parents of Algerian origin. He started playing with MC Oujda until 1979 and finished his career in 1984 with USM Oujda.

With the Morocco national team, he took part in the 1979 Mediterranean Games as a captain and to the 1980 African Cup of Nations.

== Death ==
Tahiri died on 11 August 2025, at the age of 72.

== Honours ==
MC Oujda

- Moroccan Championship: 1974–75

Morocco

- Africa Cup of Nations third place: 1980
