= Maher Hammam =

Egyptian footballer (born 1956)

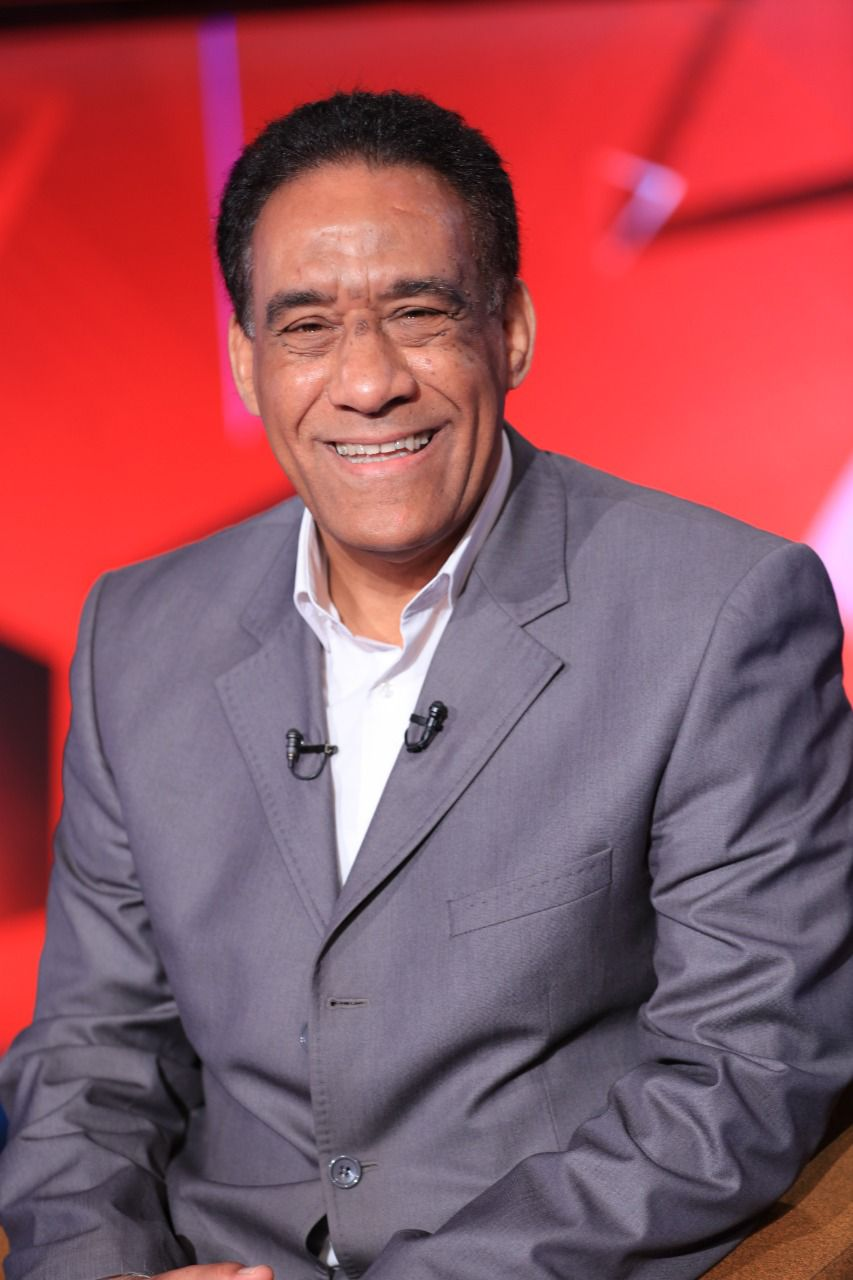

Personal information
- Date of birth: 3 October 1956 (age 70)
- Place of birth: Egypt
- Position: Defender

Senior career*
Years	Team	Apps	(Gls)
1975–1985	Al Ahli		

International career
1976–1984	Egypt	35	(0)
- * Club domestic league appearances and goals

Maher Hammam is an Egyptian football defender who played for Egypt in the 1980 African Cup of Nations. He also played for Al Ahli.
