= Thabet El-Batal =

Egyptian footballer (1953–2005)

Personal information
- Full name: Thabet El-Batal
- Date of birth: 16 September 1953
- Place of birth: El Hawamdeya, Giza, Egypt
- Date of death: 14 February 2005 (aged 51)
- Place of death: Cairo, Egypt
- Height: 1.83 m (6 ft 0 in)
- Position: Goalkeeper

Youth career
- ESIIC
- 1972–1973: Al Ahly

Senior career*
Years	Team	Apps	(Gls)
1973–1991	Al Ahly	321	(0)

International career
1976–1990	Egypt	48	(0)

Managerial career
- 2004–2005: Al Ahly's Football Director
- * Club domestic league appearances and goals

Thabet El-Batal (16 September 1953 – 14 February 2005) was an Egyptian international goalkeeper.

He played club football in his homeland (El Hawamdia). Then he went to Al Ahly between 1972 and 1991. He is considered to be one the greatest goalkeepers in africa. His name "El-Batal" is the name of his family

== Career ==
The career of Thabet El-Batal evolved from the team in his neighborhood, Al Hawmdia. He then made the acquaintance of Hawamdeh (Abdo El-Bakal) who convinced him at age 19 to sign with Al Ahly in 1972.

He joined the club in Cairo during the 1972/1973 season and played some friendly matches with a match against Ittihad, where he stopped a penalty kick, to let Al Ahly win the match 1–0.

El-Batal became the Al Ahly guard, formally beginning with the 1974/1975 season and succeeded in winning his championship year for the first time after successive victories and titles, both continental and Egyptian. He was one of the major players in the emergence of the club in Africa.

He spent a total of 17 seasons at the club and retired at the end of the 1990/1991 season, after the match against Aswan in the Egypt Cup final, where they won 1–0.

Internationally, he made his first appearance as a team to Egypt in 1974 and spent 16 years. He won the African Nations Cup in 1986 and participated in the Olympic Games. He was a member of the Egypt squad which participated in the 1990 FIFA World Cup in Italy.

In 2004, he then became the technical director of Al Ahly. He succeeded by his office in achieving many of the championships, 5 of them in successive league championships, the Egypt Cup once and twice the championship of the Arab Clubs Champions and Super Cup twice.

Thabet El-Batal died in February 2005, after a long battle with cancer.

== Honours ==
=== Club ===
Al Ahly

- Egyptian Premier League: 1974–75, 1975–76, 1976–77, 1978–79, 1979–80, 1980–81, 1981–82, 1984–85, 1985–86, 1986–87, 1988-1989
- Egypt Cup: 1978, 1981, 1983, 1984, 1985, 1989, 1991
- African Cup of Champions Clubs: 1982, 1987
- African Cup Winners' Cup: 1984, 1985, 1986
- Afro-Asian Cup: 1988

=== International ===
Egypt

- African Cup of Nations: 1986
