= Tesfaye Gebreyesus =

Ethiopian-Eritrean football referee (1935–2019)

Tesfaye Gebreyesus Difue (1935 – 24 August 2019) was an Ethiopian-Eritrean association football referee.

He officiated in competitions such as the 1977 and 1981 FIFA World Youth Championships, 1984 Summer Olympics, 1978 FIFA World Cup and six Africa Cup of Nations (1970, 1978, 1980, 1984, 1986, 1988).

He died in Asmara, Eritrea on 24 August 2019.

Following his retirement as a referee, he became president of the Eritrean National Football Federation.
