= Joe Masiga =

Kenyan footballer and rugby player

Joseph Masiga (commonly known as Joe Masiga and JJ Masiga) is a former international Kenyan footballer and rugby player. Masiga played club football for the AFC Leopards, a team with roots in western Kenya. Masiga retired from active sports and is now a dentist in Nairobi.
