= Alaa Mayhoub =

Egyptian footballer (born 1962)

Personal information
- Full name: Alaa Mohammed Mayhoub
- Date of birth: 9 January 1962 (age 64)
- Place of birth: El Hawamdeya, Giza, Egypt
- Position: Midfielder

Senior career*
Years	Team	Apps	(Gls)
1981-1992	Al-Ahly S.C.		
1992-1993	Olympic Club		

International career
1984-1990	Egypt	17	(3)
- * Club domestic league appearances and goals

Alaa Mohammed Mayhoub (Arabic: عَلَاء مُحَمَّد مَيْهُوب; born 9 January 1962) is an Egyptian football midfielder who played for Egypt in the 1990 FIFA World Cup. He also played for Al-Ahly S.C.
