= Sammy Onyango =

Kenyan footballer

Personal information
- Full name: Samuel Onyango
- Date of birth: 3 March 1961
- Place of birth: Migori District, Kenya
- Date of death: 2 August 2002 (aged 41)
- Place of death: Kisumu, Kenya
- Position: Left wing

Senior career*
Years	Team	Apps	(Gls)
1980–1980	Hakati Sportiff		(5)
1981–1989	Gor Mahia		(80)
1990 – 1994	Kisumu Posta		(16)

International career
1983–1990	Kenya	55	(3)
- * Club domestic league appearances and goals

Sammy Onyango (3 March 1961 – 2 August 2002) was a Kenya international football winger who played club football in Kenya.

== Club career ==
Born in Migori District, Onyango began playing football in the Kenyan Premier League with Hakati Sportiff in 1980 before joining Gor Mahia F.C. at age 20 in 1981.

Onyango helped Gor Mahia win a domestic league and cup double, and its first and only African Cup Winners' Cup title in 1987. He is Gor Mahia's top all-time scorer in all competitions as well as in the league with a total of 93 goals including 80 league goals. In 1990, he joined Kisumu Posta, the club he would finish his playing career with in the 1994.

== International career ==
Onyango made several appearances for the Kenya national football team, including six FIFA World Cup qualifying matches. He played for Kenya at the 1988 and 1990 African Cup of Nations finals. He also won a silver medal with Kenya at the 1987 All-Africa Games in Nairobi.

== Personal ==
Onyango died in a traffic accident in Kisumu on 2 August 2002.
