= Khaled El Kamash =

Egyptian football manager (born 1961)

Personal information
- Date of birth: 1 August 1961 (age 65)
- Place of birth: Ismailia, Egypt

Senior career*
Years	Team	Apps	(Gls)
1981–1995	Ismaily		

Managerial career
- 2005: Ismaily (assistant)
- 2005: Ismaily
- 2008: Ismaily
- 2008: Ismaily (director of sports)
- 2009–2010: Ismaily (youth)
- 2010: Al Hammam
- 2010: Al-Nasr Benghazi
- 2011: Ala'ab Damanhour
- 2011–2012: Ismaily (technical)
- 2012: Dhofar
- 2012–2013: Al-Jabalain
- 2013–2015: Ittihad El Shorta
- 2016: Ghazl El Mahalla
- 2016: Ismaily
- 2016–2017: Pharco
- 2017: El Raja
- 2018: El Minya
- 2019: Ala'ab Damanhour
- * Club domestic league appearances and goals

Khaled El Kamash (born 1 August 1961) is an Egyptian football manager.
