= Juma Mkambi =

Tanzanian footballer

Personal information
- Date of birth: 1955
- Place of birth: Tanganyika Territory
- Date of death: 21 November 2010 (aged 55)
- Place of death: Dar es Salaam, Tanzania
- Position: Midfielder

Senior career*
Years	Team	Apps	(Gls)
?–1977	Nyota Africa		
1977–?	Yanga		
?–?	Pan Africa		
?–1989	Super Star		

International career
1979–1987	Tanzania		
- * Club domestic league appearances and goals

Juma Mkambi (1955 – 21 November 2010) was a Tanzanian footballer who played as a midfielder and has represented the Tanzania national team.

== Career ==
Mkambi started playing football with local side Nyota Africa. He joined Yanga in 1979, where he would spend most of his career. In the late 1980s, he moved to Yanga's rivals Pan African FC and then finished his career at Super Star.

Mkambi made several appearances for the senior Tanzania national football team, including three FIFA World Cup qualifying matches, and played at the 1980 African Cup of Nations finals.

== Personal ==
Mkambi died in a Dar es Salaam hospital at age 55 on 21 November 2010.
