= Hamada Sedki =

Egyptian footballer (born 1961)

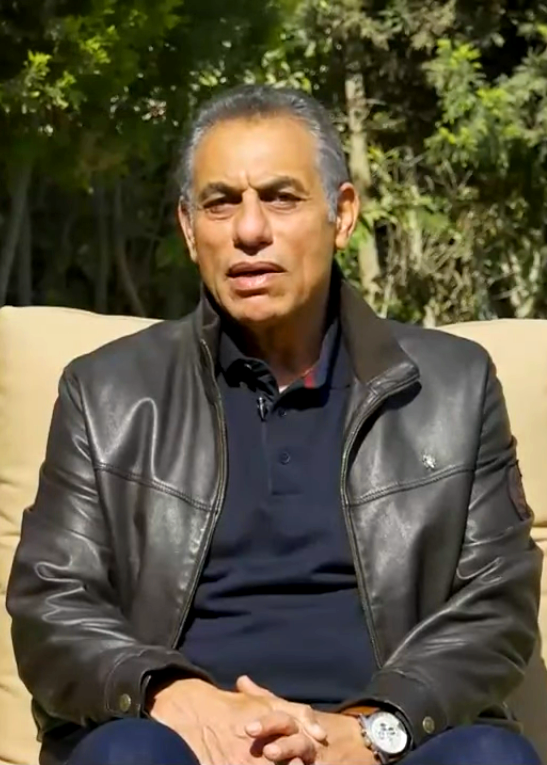

Personal information
- Full name: Mohamed Yahia Sedki
- Date of birth: 25 August 1961 (age 65)
- Position: Centre back

Team information
- Current team: Egypt Olympic

Senior career*
Years	Team	Apps	(Gls)
1979–1986	El Minya SC		
1986–1993	Al Ahly		

International career
1983–1992	Egypt	58	(0)

Managerial career
- 2004–2004: Al-Hazem F.C.
- 2004–2004: Al Ittihad Alexandria Club (asst.)
- 2004–2004: Al-Hazem F.C.
- 2005–2011: Egypt (asst.)
- 2011–2013: Smouha (asst.)
- 2013–2014: Smouha
- 2014–2016: Wadi Degla
- 2016–2016: ENPPI
- 2017–2018: Egypt U20
- 2018–2019: El Gouna
- 2019–2020: Al-Hilal Club
- 2020: Smouha
- 2021: El Entag El Harby
- 2023: Dhofar
- 2025: ZED FC
- 2026: ES Sétif
- 2026-: Egypt Olympic
- * Club domestic league appearances and goals

Mohamed Yahia Sedki, known as Hamada Sedki (Arabic: حمادة صدقي; born 25 August 1961) is an Egyptian footballer. He played as a central defender for Al Ahly from 1986 to 1993, winning 25 international caps.
