= National Stadium, Lagos =

Multi-purpose stadium in Surulere, Lagos State, Nigeria

Coordinates: 6°29′49″N 3°21′53″E

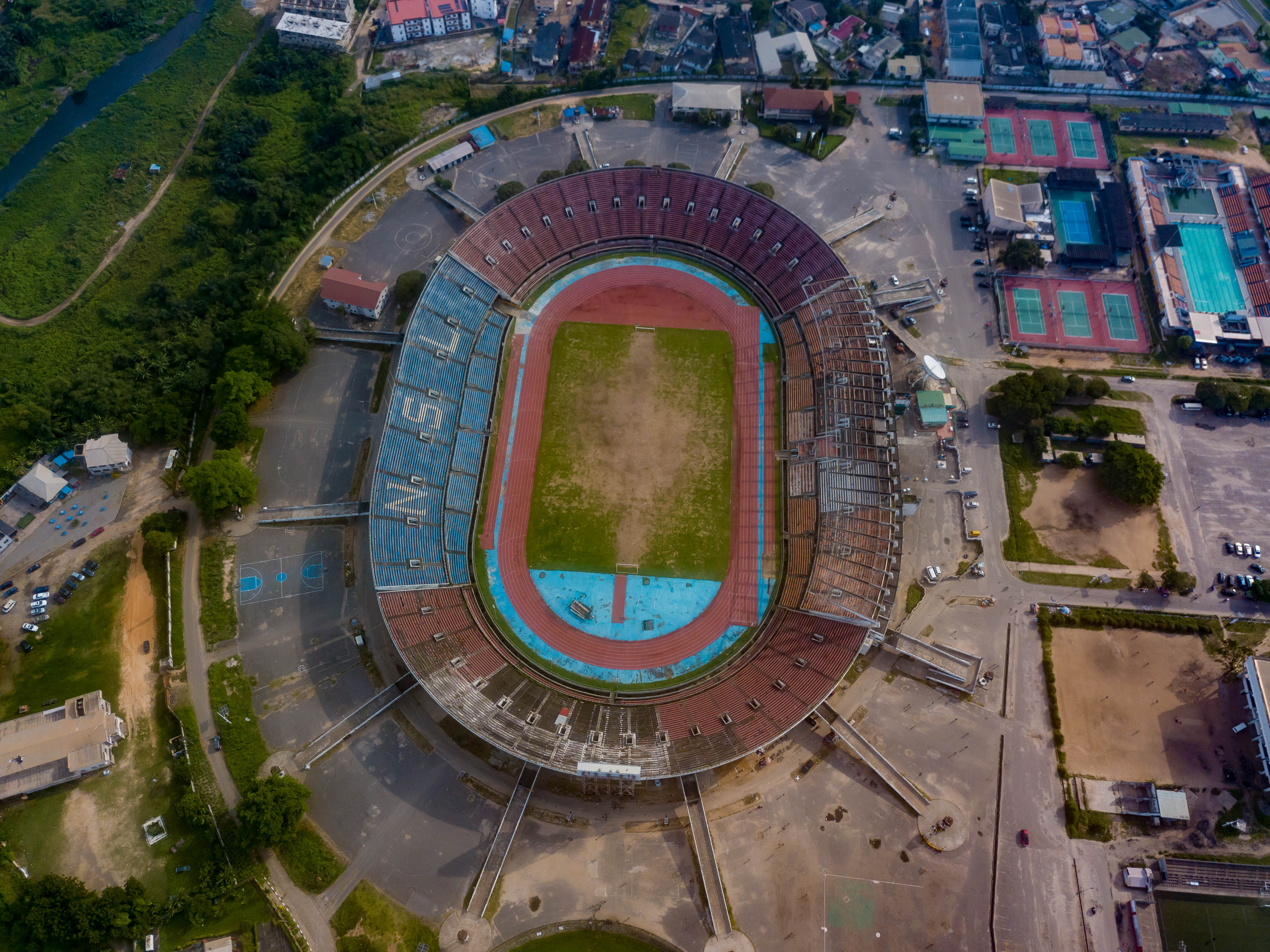
- Interactive map of National Stadium, Lagos
- Full name: National Stadium
- Former names: Surulere Stadium
- Location: Surulere, Lagos
- Owner: Nigerian government
- Capacity: 55,000 (1972); 45,000 (1999)
- Surface: Grass
- Record attendance: 85,000

Construction
- Built: 1961
- Opened: 4 December 1972; 53 years ago
- Renovated: 1972, 2024
- Expanded: 1972
- Architect: Isaac Fola-Alade
- Project manager: Albino Luigino Davanzo

Tenant
- Cowrie Rugby Football Club (rugby union)

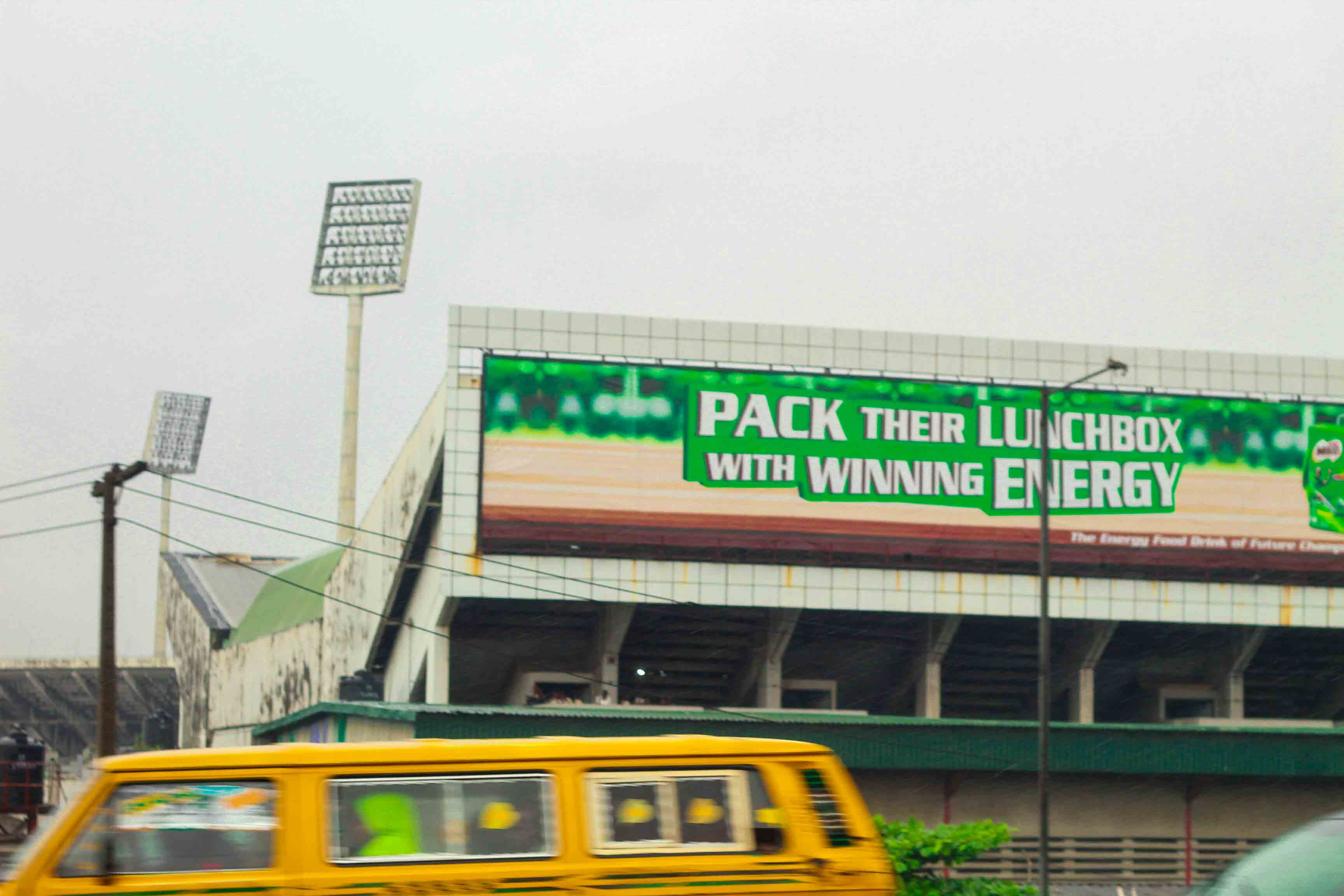
Side view of the Indoor Sports Complex

The Lagos National Stadium is a multi-purpose stadium in Surulere, Lagos State, Nigeria. It comprises an Olympic-size swimming arena and a multipurpose arena used for athletics, rugby union, basketball, volleyball, table tennis, wrestling and boxing matches. It was used mostly for football matches until 2004. It has hosted several international competitions, including the 1980 African Cup of Nations final, the 2000 African Cup of Nations final, and FIFA World Cup qualifying matches. It also served as the main stadium for the 1973 All-Africa Games.

== History ==
When the stadium was built in 1972, it had a capacity of 55,000. The capacity was later reduced to 45,000 in 1999. The highest attendance, 85,000, was recorded in the final match of the African Cup of Nations in 1980 between Nigeria and Algeria.

Its 50-meter pool was closed in 1999.

For unknown reasons, the National Stadium had been left in dilapidated state since the early 2000s until 2022 when the FG began renovation work at the stadium. It last hosted a national team game in 2004, with football matches moved to the nearby Teslim Balogun Stadium. It is now occasionally used for religious gatherings and has been taken over by area boys and squatters. In 2009, the National Sports Commission begun a concerted effort to bring the facility back to world class status.

A Board of Management, headed by businessman Sir Mobolaji Bank Anthony and counting the lawyer F. A. S. Ogunmuyiwa as one of its members, was established in the 1960s to oversee the stadium's construction and management.

== Notable football events ==
=== 1980 African Cup of Nations ===
| Date | Team 1 | Result | Team 2 | Round |
|---|---|---|---|---|
| 8 March 1980 | Nigeria | 3–1 | Tanzania | Group A |
| 8 March 1980 | Egypt | 2–1 | Ivory Coast | Group A |
| 12 March 1980 | Egypt | 2–1 | Tanzania | Group A |
| 12 March 1980 | Nigeria | 0–0 | Ivory Coast | Group A |
| 15 March 1980 | Ivory Coast | 1–1 | Tanzania | Group A |
| 15 March 1980 | Nigeria | 1–0 | Egypt | Group A |
| 19 March 1980 | Nigeria | 1–0 | Morocco | Semifinal |
| 21 March 1980 | Morocco | 2–0 | Egypt | Third place match |
| 22 March 1980 | Nigeria | 3–0 | Algeria | Final |

=== 1999 FIFA World Youth Championship ===
| Date | Team 1 | Result | Team 2 | Attendance | Round |
|---|---|---|---|---|---|
| 2 April 1999 | Nigeria | 1–1 | Costa Rica | 37,500 | Group A |
| 4 April 1999 | Germany | 4–0 | Paraguay | 2,500 | Group A |
| 7 April 1999 | Nigeria | 2–0 | Germany | 20,000 | Group A |
| 7 April 1999 | Costa Rica | 1–3 | Paraguay | 18,000 | Group A |
| 10 April 1999 | Nigeria | 1–2 | Paraguay | 25,000 | Group A |
| 10 April 1999 | Costa Rica | 2–1 | Germany | 22,000 | Group A |
| 14 April 1999 | Paraguay | 2–2 (a.e.t.) (9–10 p) | Uruguay | 1,500 | Round of 16 |
| 18 April 1999 | Uruguay | 2–1 | Brazil | 10,000 | Quarter-final |
| 21 April 1999 | Uruguay | 1–2 | Japan | 8,000 | Semi-final |
| 24 April 1999 | Mali | 1–0 | Uruguay | 35,000 | Third place play-off |
| 24 April 1999 | Spain | 4–0 | Japan | 38,000 | Final |

=== 2000 African Cup of Nations ===
| Date | Team 1 | Result | Team 2 | Attendance | Round |
|---|---|---|---|---|---|
| 23 January 2000 | Nigeria | 4–2 | Tunisia | 80,000 | Group D |
| 25 January 2000 | Morocco | 1–0 | Congo | 8,000 | Group D |
| 28 January 2000 | Nigeria | 0–0 | Congo | 60,000 | Group D |
| 29 January 2000 | Tunisia | 0–0 | Morocco | 5,000 | Group D |
| 1 February 2000 | Zambia | 2–2 | Senegal | 2,000 | Group C |
| 3 February 2000 | Nigeria | 2–0 | Morocco | 60,000 | Group D |
| 7 February 2000 | Nigeria | 2–1 (a.e.t.) | Senegal | 60,000 | Quarterfinal |
| 10 February 2000 | Nigeria | 2–0 | South Africa | 60,000 | Semifinal |
| 13 February 2000 | Nigeria | 2–2 (a.e.t.) (3–4 p) | Cameroon | 60,000 | Final |

== Architecture ==
The National Stadium was designed by Fola Alade Associates in the year 1970. Construction and supervision took place between 1971 and 1973 by Fola Alade the architect who designed the stadium, before the All African games that happened in 1973 you can find more details here. The stadium was used as the major sporting facility for the games.

== Gallery ==
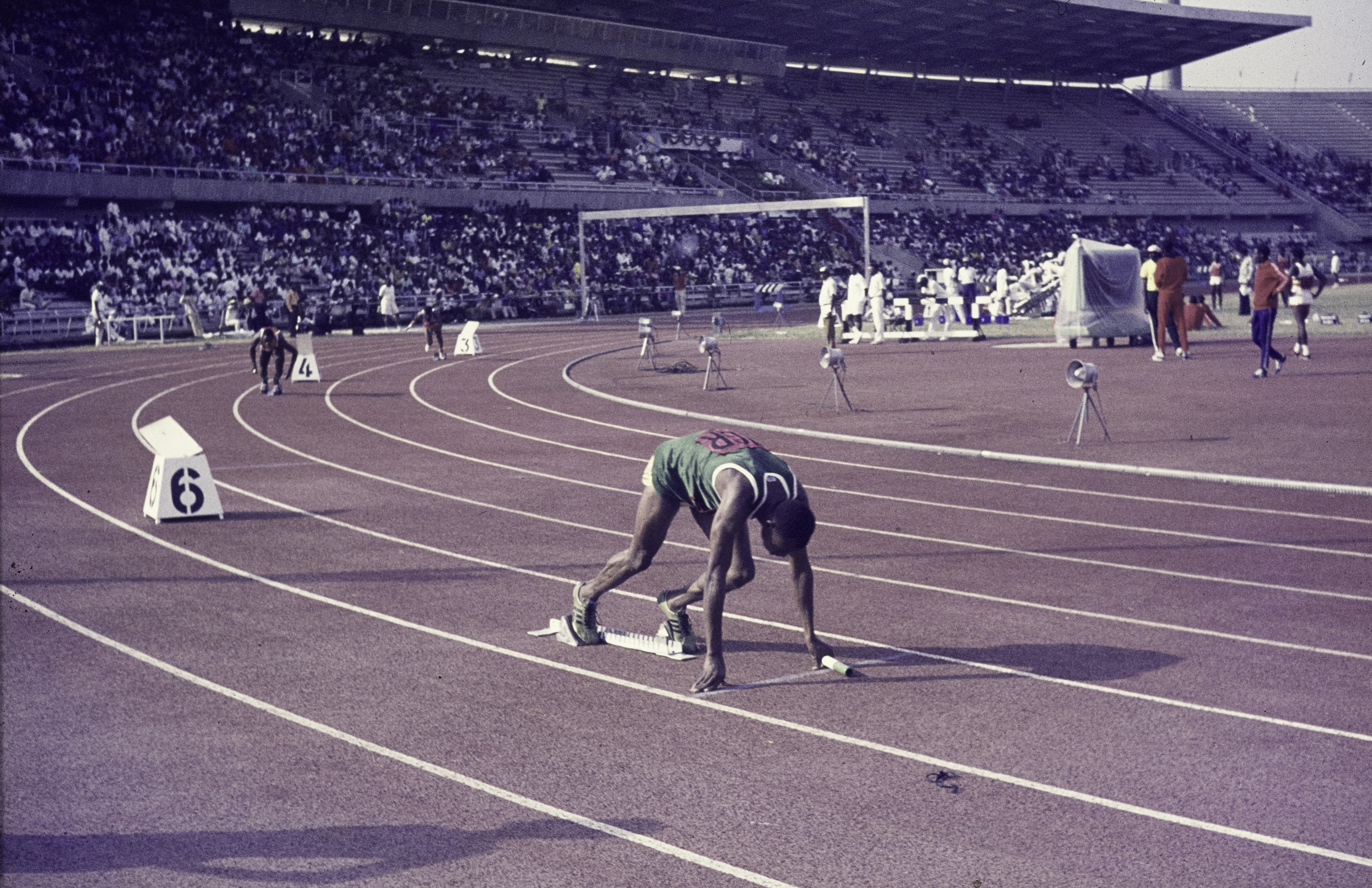
Pan African Games Lagos January 7–18, 1973. Runners in the starting position on courts

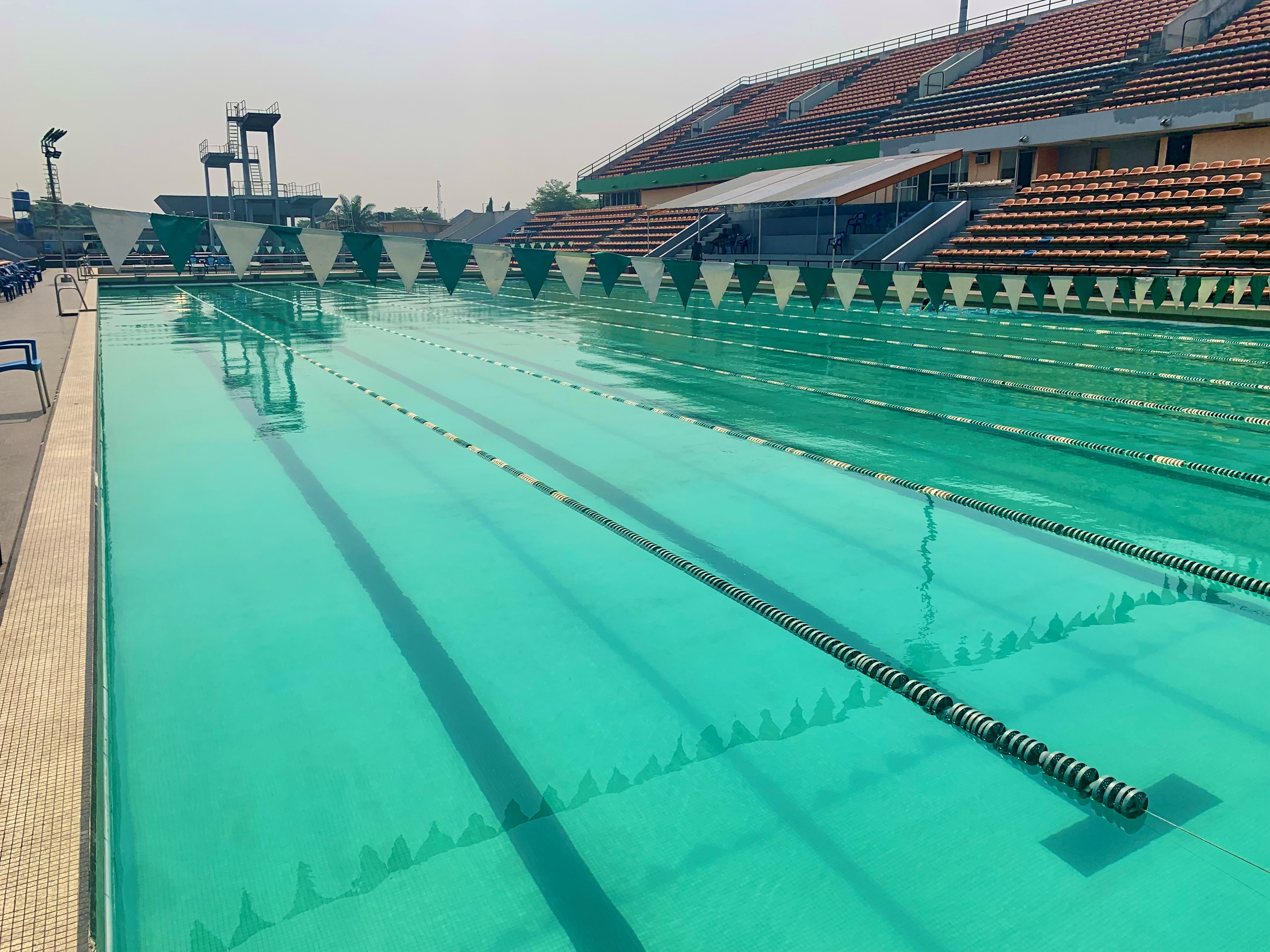
Swimming Pool In National Stadium Lagos

== See also ==
- List of football stadiums in Nigeria

| Preceded by Accra Sports Stadium; Stade du 4-Août | African Cup of Nations; Final Venue; 1980; 2000 | Succeeded by 11 June Stadium; Stade 26 mars |
