= Ahmed Ayoub =

Egyptian footballer (born 1971)

Personal information
- Date of birth: August 5, 1971 (age 55)
- Place of birth: Cairo, Egypt
- Height: 1.82 m (6 ft 0 in)
- Position: Defender

Team information
- Current team: Egypt (assistant)

Youth career
- 1989–1991: Tersana

Senior career*
| Years | Team | Apps | (Gls) |
| 1991–1997 | Al Ahly | | |
| 1997–1999 | El-Qanah | | |
| 1999–2000 | El-Sharquia | | |
| 2000–2002 | El-Qanah | | |
| 2002–2007 | Haras El-Hodood | | |

International career
- Egypt U-20

Managerial career
- 2007–2011: Haras El-Hodood (assistant)
- 2011–2012: ENPPI (assistant)
- 2012–2015: Al Ahly (assistant)
- 2015–2016: Haras El-Hodood
- 2016–2018: Al Ahly (assistant)
- 2018: Al Ahly
- 2018: Pyramids (assistant)
- 2019–2021: Egypt (assistant)
- 2022–2023: Haras El-Hodood
- * Club domestic league appearances and goals

Ahmed Ayoub (Arabic أحمد أيوب); born (August 5, 1971), is an Egyptian former football striker. He last managed Egyptian Premier League club Haras El-Hodood.

Ayoub was a member in Egypt U-20 squad which participated in 1991 FIFA World Youth Championship.

== Titles and honors ==
Al Ahly

- Egyptian League (4): 1993-1994, 1994-1995, 1995-1996, 1996-1997
- Egypt Cup (1): 1995-1996
- CAF Cup Winners' Cup (1): 1993
- Arab Super Cup (1): 1997
- Arab Club Champions Cup (1): 1996
- Arab Cup Winners' Cup (1): 1994
