= Abdel Aziz Abdel Shafy =

Egyptian football manager (born 1952)

Personal information
- Full name: Abdel Aziz Abdel Shafy
- Date of birth: December 25, 1952 (age 73)
- Place of birth: Cairo, Egypt
- Positions: Left winger; striker; center-forward

Team information
- Current team: Pyramids FC (Caretaker)

Youth career
- 1964–1968: Al Ahly

Senior career*
Years	Team	Apps	(Gls)
1968–1980	Al Ahly		

International career
- Egypt

Managerial career
- 1981–1982: Al Ahli SC (Tripoli) (Director Of Football)
- 1985–1987: Al-Ahli Saudi FC (Direct. Of Youth Dept.)
- 1991–1993: Egypt (Assistant Manager)
- 1993–1994: Al-Ittihad Club (Jeddah) (Direct. Of Youth Dept.)
- 1999–2000: Egypt U23
- 2000–2000: Al Ittihad Alexandria Club
- 2000–2001: Nejmeh SC
- 2001–2002: Al Masry SC
- 2002–2002: Al Mokawloon Al Arab SC
- 2007–2007: Suez Cement SC
- 2010–2010: Nejmeh SC
- 2010–2010: Al Ahly SC U23 (Director Of Football)
- 2010–2010: Al Ahly SC (Caretaker Manager)
- 2011–2011: Al Ahly SC U23 (Director Of Football)
- 2014–2014: Al Ahed FC
- 2016–2016: Al Ahly SC (Caretaker Manager)
- 2016–2019: Al Ahly SC (Managing Director Sport)
- 2019–: Pyramids FC (Strategic Advisor)
- 2019: Pyramids FC (Caretaker Manager)
- * Club domestic league appearances and goals

Abdel Aziz Abdel Shafy (Arabic : عبد العزيز عبد الشافي) (commonly known as Zizo) is an Egyptian manager and football director (born on December 25, 1952), who was a former striker and coach.

== Football career ==
=== Club career ===
Zizo played within Al Ahly youth ranks since the age of 15. He became a member of the senior team when he was 17.

He spent ten years with Al Ahly, scoring over 100 goals for the club through all ranks.

He was dubbed one of the most talented footballers in the history of Egyptian football, but had to retire at the age of 27 due to a serious injury.

=== International career ===
Zizo represented Egypt during the 1970s. He played a major role in helping Egypt win the Palestine Cup of Nations in 1972, scoring two goals in the final against hosts Iraq.

He is one of very few Egyptian footballers to make his Egypt debut at the age of 17.

He scored on his debut against German Democratic Republic in a friendly match in 1969.

== Managing career ==
=== Egypt ===
After he retired in 1982, Zizo was immediately appointed football director for Al Ahly, winning the CAF Champions League in 1982.

He worked as an assistant manager to Mahmoud El-Gohary for the Egypt first team in the early 1990s. He won the 1992 Arab Nations Cup in Syria with the team. Zizo also coached the Egypt Olympic team in 1999.

He managed several Egyptian clubs including Al-Ittihad Al-Sakndary, Al-Masry, Baladeyet Al-Mahalla, Al-Mokawloon Al-Arab and Asmant Suez.

Zizo led Baladeyet Al-Mahalla to the final of Egyptian Cup in 2002 for the first and only time in the club's history.

He had three different spells as Al Ahly interim coach, as he guided the club to the 2015 Egyptian Super Cup which was staged in the United Arab Emirates for the first time.

In the 2016–2017 season, Zizo, who was the club's head of football sector, played a vital role in Al Ahly's Egyptian Premier League victory, as he left the team 7 points clear on top of the table during his spell as interim manager.

=== Saudi Arabia ===
In Saudi Arabia, Zizo worked with Al-Ahli Jeddah between 1986 and 1987. He won the KSA Youth Championship title & Regional title with the club in 1987.

A few years later, he joined rivals Al Ittihad as he won the KSA Youth Championship title in 1993.

=== Lebanon ===
In Lebanon, Zizo won the Lebanese Premier League with Nejmeh in 2004 and 2005.

He also won the Lebanese Super Cup and Lebanese Elite Cup.

== Managerial statistics ==
As of match played 25 December 2019

Managerial record by team and tenure
Team	From	To	Record					Ref.
Team	From	To	P	W	D	L	Win %	Ref.
Egypt U23	1 July 1999	1 March 2000	0	0	0	0	—	
Al Ittihad Alexandria Club	3 April 2000	30 June 2000	11	1	5	5	9.1	
Nejmeh SC	1 July 2000	30 June 2001	1	1	0	0	100.0	
Al Masry SC	27 November 2001	1 July 2002	5	3	0	2	60.0	
Al Mokawloon Al Arab SC	1 July 2002	1 October 2002	3	0	1	2	0.0	
Suez Cement SC	1 July 2007	7 November 2007	11	1	3	7	9.1	
Nejmeh SC	12 March 2010	22 May 2010	11	7	0	4	63.6	
Al Ahly SC (Caretaker)	23 November 2010	31 December 2010	6	2	4	0	33.3	
Al Ahed FC	21 January 2014	29 May 2014	11	3	5	3	27.3	
Al Ahly SC (Caretaker)	18 January 2016	3 March 2016	8	5	3	0	62.5	
Pyramids FC (Caretaker)	18 December 2019	26 December 2019	2	1	1	0	50.0	
Total			69	24	22	23	34.8	—

== Honors ==
Footballer

With Al Ahly:

5 Egyptian Premier League in 1974–75, 1975–76, 1976–77, 1978–79 and 1979–80

1 Egyptian Cup in 1978

As Football Director

with Al Ahly:

CAF Champions League 1982

3 Egyptian Cup titles in 1982, 1983, 1984

As Manager

With Al Ahly:

- Egyptian Super Cup 2015

With Nejmeh:

- Lebanese Premier League 2004, 2005, 2008
- Lebanese Super Cup 2004
- Lebanese Elite Cup 2004, 2005
