= Segun Odegbami =

Nigerian footballer (born 1952)

Personal information
- Full name: Patrick Olusegun Odegbami
- Date of birth: 27 August 1952 (age 74)
- Place of birth: Lagos, British Nigeria
- Position: Forward

Senior career*
Years	Team	Apps	(Gls)
1969	Ibadan Housing Corporation		
1970–1984	Shooting Stars		

International career
1976–1981	Nigeria	47	(22)
- * Club domestic league appearances and goals

Patrick Olusegun Odegbami (Yoruba: Ṣẹ́gun Ọdẹ́gbàmí) (born 27 August 1952), often shortened as Segun Odegbami, is a Nigerian former professional footballer who played as a forward

== Early life ==
Odegbami was born on 27 August 1952 in Lagos, Nigeria to Jacob Adebola Odegbami (1911–2003) and Beatrice Bintu Abeke Odegbami (née Olotu) (1921–2018), one of their seven children. His father was an older half-brother of Nigerian author Amos Tutuola. Odegbami was brought up in the northern city of Jos, Plateau State along with many other members of his extended family.

== Playing career ==
Odegbami won 47 caps and scored 22 goals for the Nigeria national team which he guided to its first Africa Cup of Nations title at the 1980 tournament in his homeland. Nicknamed Mathematical, he was famous for his skill on the ball, speed and precision of his crosses from the right wing. He played for IICC Shooting Stars of Ibadan his entire career, from 1970 to 1984. His last game was the 1984 African Champions Cup final defeat to Zamalek of Egypt. The original source of the nickname "Mathematical" was because Segun Odegbami attended and graduated from Nigeria's premier technical institution; The Polytechnic, Ibadan where he studied engineering.

== Post-playing career ==
In 2007 Odegbami appeared on Nigerian Who Wants To Be A Millionaire hosted by Frank Edoho. He played a game for charity with Zebrudaya and donated his winnings to The Little Saints’ Orphanage on the Strong Tower Mission.

In September 2015, Odegbami stated his intention to run for FIFA presidency.

In June 2022, he launched a radio station called Eagles 7 Sports Radio 103.7 FM in Nigeria.

== Personal life ==
Odegbami has a daughter who sings under the name May7ven.

His two other brothers were also involved with football at other levels. His older brother Dele Odegbami played football in the old Western Region for his school (Ebenezer Grammar School, Abeokuta), the West Academicals, his university, UNN Nsukka, and briefly for Stationery Stores football club of Lagos. His other brother, Wole Odegbami, is also a former national team player, playing on the Nigerian national team for 11 years. He is a columnist in Nigeria.

== Honours ==
Shooting Stars

- Nigerian Premier League: 1976, 1980, 1983
- Nigerian FA Cup: 1977, 1979
- African Cup Winners' Cup: 1976

Nigeria

- All-Africa Games: Silver medal 1978
- Africa Cup of Nations: 1980

Individual

- Africa Cup of Nations goalscorer: 1978, 1980 (with Khaled Labied) with 3 goals
- Africa Cup of Nations Team of the Tournament: 1978, 1980
- MasterCard African Team of the 20th Century: 1998
