= Fathi Mabrouk =

Egyptian football manager (born 1951)

Personal information
- Full name: Fathi Mabrouk Hanafy
- Date of birth: 5 July 1951
- Place of birth: Egypt
- Position: Defender

Senior career*
| Years | Team | Apps | (Gls) |
| 1970–1981 | Al Ahly | | |

International career
| 1974–1980 | Egypt | 10 | (0) |

Managerial career
- 2013–2015: Al Ahly
- * Club domestic league appearances and goals

Fathi Mabrouk (born 5 July 1951) is an Egyptian former football defender who played for Egypt in the 1980 African Cup of Nations. He also played for Al Ahly.

On 5 May 2015, Mabrouk was appointed new manager of Al Ahly after Juan Carlos Garrido was sacked. On 6 October 2015, Mabrouk was sacked.

== Honours ==
=== Managerial ===
Al-Ahly

- Egyptian Premier League: 2013–14
