= Mokhtar Mokhtar =

Egyptian football manager (born 1954)

Personal information
- Full name: Mokhtar Ali Mokhtar
- Date of birth: 17 August 1954 (age 72)
- Place of birth: Cairo, Egypt
- Position: Midfielder

Team information
- Current team: El-Entag El-Harby (Manager)

Senior career*
Years	Team	Apps	(Gls)
1972–1975	Esco		
1975–1984	Al Ahly		

International career
1976–1983	Egypt	46	(7)

Managerial career
- 1998–2000: Al Ahly (Youth Coach)
- 2000–2000: Al Ahly
- 2000–2002: Al Ahly (Assistant)
- 2002–2003: Ghazl El Mahalla
- 2005–2010: Petrojet
- 2010–2010: Al-Masry
- 2010–2011: Al-Wehda
- 2011–2011: ENPPI
- 2012–2012: Al-Oruba
- 2012–2013: Dhofar
- 2013–2014: Petrojet
- 2015–2015: Al-Masry
- 2016–2017: El Ittihad Alexandria
- 2017–2021: El-Entag El-Harby
- 2021: Ghazl El Mahalla
- * Club domestic league appearances and goals

Mokhtar Ali Mokhtar (Arabic: مختار علي مختار; born 17 August 1954) is an Egyptian football coach and former player.

== Playing career ==
=== Al Ahly SC ===
"Mokhtar Ali Mokhtar" started his football career as a U-18 player at ESCO Club in Shubra, then moved after his brilliance to Al-Ahly club, thanks to Engineer Ali Rakha, Chairman of the Board of Directors of ASCO Club.

Mokhtar participated in the first official match with Al-Ahly in the second week of the 75/1976 season against Kafr El-Sheikh in his stadium in Kafr El-Sheikh stadium and Al-Ahly won 2 / zero. In the third week, Al-Ahly met his home with Al-Minya team and Al-Ahly won 6 / zero. Mokhtar scored the third goal inaugurating his goal in the Red Castle.

Throughout the 8 seasons Mokhtar spent in Al-Ahly starting from the 75/1976 season and ending in the 82/1983 season and only one match in the 83/1984 season, Mokhtar played 153 games in the general league during which Al-Ahly won 110 games, drew in 34 games and lost only 9 games.

Mokhtar scored with Al-Ahly 26 goals in the Egyptian General League and won the shield 6 times in seasons 75/76, 76/77, 78/79, 79/80, 80/81, 81/1982 and Mukhtar participated in 17 games in the Egypt Cup, Al-Ahly won 13 and drew In one and he lost 3 games, he scored two goals and scored with Al-Ahly the Cup Championship 3 times in the years 78, 81, 1983.

Mokhtar participated in 24 matches in the African Champions League Clubs Championship, Al-Ahly won 13, drew 6, lost 5 games, scored a goal against the Nigerian Ingo Rangers goalkeeper in the 1982 semi-final in Cairo, and scored a goal against Zimbabwe's Dynamo Harare in the 16th round in Cairo in 1983. He scored two goals against the Libyan city in Cairo in 1977 and Al-Ahly won 7/2

Mokhtar achieved the first African Championship in 1982, to be the total of what he fought with the first team of the club since joining 194 games, won 136, drew 41 and lost 17 games, scored 32 goals, 26 in the General League, two goals in the Egypt Cup and 4 goals in the African Championship.

In the opening of Al-Ahly matches in the 83/1984 season in front of the contractors at Cairo Stadium, and 13 minutes before the start of the match, Mokhtar had scored for Al-Ahly a goal in the goal, but Antoine Cameroonian goalkeeper for the contractors and it did not take 10 minutes until Mokhtar was injured in a joint ball with Saeed Al-Shishini who fell With all his body on the knee of Mokhtar, where his leg was atrophied and several operations were performed, but his right leg remained painful after he trained with strength and violence to restore his speed, but he was unable and decided to retire the ball and as a confirmation of his high morals he insisted in his honor match held on Friday, January 24, 1986 that he be around the field He raised his hand in the hands of Saeed Al-Shish The captain of the Arab Contractors Club team declares this in front of everyone that El Shishiny did not intend to injure him and that he does not hold any grudge for him and the audience received this situation with enthusiasm after he was calling on selected colleagues on the field to avenge him and as a result of this wonderful position, In 1985 the International Committee of UNESCO in Paris decided to grant Mokhtar the Fair Play Prize and received the trophy on the September 25th, 1986.

=== Egypt ===
At the international level, Mokhtar played 42 caps for Egypt.

His first official match was in the African Nations Cup in Ethiopia on 3 March 1976 and Egypt won 2/1.

== Coaching career ==
=== Al Ahly SC ===
Mokhtar Mokhtar took over the training of junior teams in Al-Ahly after obtaining multiple studies in training and worked as a coach for the first team with Portuguese technical director Manuel Jose.

=== Petrojet SC ===
Mokhtar worked as coach of the Petrojet Club team from 2005 to 2010.

=== ENPPI SC ===
Mokhtar Mokhtar won his first title in his history after achieving the Egyptian Cup title in 2011 for Enppi.

=== El Entag El Harby SC ===
He took over the training of the El Entag El Harby SC in March 2017.

== Managerial statistics ==
As of match played 21 December 2020

Managerial record by team and tenure
Team	From	To	Record					Ref.
Team	From	To	P	W	D	L	Win %	Ref.
Al Ahly SC	31 August 2000	14 October 2000	5	4	1	0	80.0	
Ghazl El Mahalla	1 July 2002	30 June 2003	28	8	10	10	28.6	
Petrojet	1 July 2005	31 May 2010	159	69	46	44	43.4	
Al Masry	1 June 2010	26 November 2010	12	4	4	4	33.3	
Al-Wehda	25 December 2010	15 May 2011	15	3	4	8	20.0	
ENPPI	12 July 2011	27 December 2011	13	3	5	5	23.1	
Al-Orouba	20 February 2012	30 July 2012	17	8	5	4	47.1	
Dhofar	5 November 2012	12 April 2013	26	11	11	4	42.3	
Petrojet	2 May 2013	7 October 2014	35	11	11	13	31.4	
Al Masry	29 April 2015	13 July 2015	12	5	3	4	41.7	
Al Ittihad Alexandria	9 March 2016	13 February 2017	36	14	7	15	38.9	
El-Entag El-Harby	20 March 2017	""Present""	126	38	44	44	30.2	
Total			484	178	151	155	36.8	—

== Honours ==
=== Manager ===
- Saudi Crown Prince Cup:
  - Runner-Up in 2010–11 Saudi Crown Prince Cup with Al-Wehda Club (Mecca)
- Egypt Cup:
  - Winner in 2011 Egypt Cup with ENPPI SC
