= Mussad Nur =

Egyptian footballer (1951–2011)

Mosaad Nour
Personal information
- Full name: Mosaad Nour
- Date of birth: 23 April 1951
- Place of birth: Port Said, Egypt
- Date of death: 23 April 2011 (aged 60)
- Place of death: Cairo, Egypt
- Height: 1.72 m (5 ft 8 in)
- Position: Forward

Youth career
- 1968–1970: Zamalek

Senior career*
Years	Team	Apps	(Gls)
1970–1985	Al-Masry	173	(87)

International career
1974–1981	Egypt	22	(5)
- * Club domestic league appearances and goals

Mosaad Nour (Arabic: مسعد نور; born 23 April 1951 – 23 April 2011), popularly nicknamed Kastan, is a former Egyptian football player and the historic star for Al-Masry Club.

== Career ==
- "Kastan" played for Al-Masry Club between 1972 and 1985 and for the Egyptian National Team between 1974 and 1981 (scoring 5 goals) in 22 international matches. He made his debut in 1972/73 season of the Egyptian League against Zamalek SC on 25 May 1973, when he scored his first goal with his team in this match which ended (2–2).
- Mosaad Nour, is one of the most skilled Egyptian football players and of course the most famous and popular player for Al-Masry throughout its long history.
- "Kastan" moved to Al-Masry in 1972 and spent 13 years with the club before he retired in October 1985.
- Unfortunately Mosaad Nour could not win any titles with his beloved team Al-Masry although he was so near from capturing the Egypt Cup for two consecutive years in seasons 1982/83 and 1983/84. Meanwhile "Kastan" was so near from winning the Egyptian League in season 1983/84 but he missed the chance.
- Mosaad Nour refused all the offers to leave his team, although he had many offers to move to either Al-Ahly or Zamalek SC, and such manner was sufficient to make him the beloved star for Al-Masry's fans throughout the years.

== Achievements ==
=== Personal ===
- Scored 65 goals for Al-Masry in the Egyptian league.

=== Egyptian national team ===
- The fourth place for Egypt national football team in the African Cup of Nations in 1980 (scored one goal)
- Led Egypt to the Olympic Games in 1980.
- Played in the Mediterranean Games 1975 and 1979.

=== Al-Masry ===
- The third place in the Egyptian League for three seasons in 1979/1980, 1980/1981 and 1983/1984.
- The second place in the Egypt Cup for two seasons in 1982/1983 and 1983/1984.
