= 1980 African Cup of Nations squads =

Below is a list of squads used in the 1980 African Cup of Nations.

== Group A ==
=== Ivory Coast ===
Coach: Gérard Gabo and (Argentina) José D'Amico

No.	Pos.	Player	Date of birth (age)	Caps	Goals	Club
	GK	Daniel Ettoukan				(Ivorian Football Federation)
	GK	Seydou Konaté				(Ivorian Football Federation)
	DF	Philibert Dié Foneye				(Ivorian Football Federation)
	DF	Paul Bouabré				(Ivorian Football Federation)
	DF	Narcisse Kuyo				(Ivorian Football Federation)
	DF	Gaston Adjoukoua	14 February 1958 (aged 22)			(Ivorian Football Federation) Africa Sports
	DF	Laurent Zahui	10 August 1960 (aged 19)			(Ivorian Football Federation) Stade d'Abidjan
	MF	Kouman Kobinam				(Ivorian Football Federation) Africa Sports
	MF	Pascal Miézan	3 April 1959 (aged 20)			(Ivorian Football Federation) Africa Sports
	MF	Ani Gomé				(Ivorian Football Federation)
	FW	Laurent Pokou	8 October 1947 (aged 32)			(Ivorian Football Federation) ASEC Mimosas
	FW	Maxime Lacina Traoré				(Ivorian Football Federation)
	MF	François Bohé				(Ivorian Football Federation)
	DF	Séverin Tapé Zogbo				(Ivorian Football Federation) ASEC Mimosas
	FW	Djibril Cissé				(Ivorian Football Federation)
	FW	Jérôme Lebry Manahou				(Ivorian Football Federation)
	DF	Emile Gnahoré				(Ivorian Football Federation)
	FW	Michel Goba	8 August 1961 (aged 18)			(Ivorian Football Federation) Africa Sports

=== Egypt ===
Coach: Abdel Monem El-Hajj

No.	Pos.	Player	Date of birth (age)	Caps	Goals	Club
	GK	Thabet El-Batal	16 September 1953 (aged 26)			(Egyptian Football Association) Al Ahly
	GK	Ekramy El-Shahat	26 October 1955 (aged 24)			(Egyptian Football Association) Al-Ahly
	GK	Adel El-Maamour	11 November 1955 (aged 24)			(Egyptian Football Association) Zamalek SC
	DF	Mohamed Omar	3 September 1958 (aged 21)			(Egyptian Football Association) Al-Ittihad Alexandria
	DF	Mohamed Bedeir	3 October 1958 (aged 21)			(Egyptian Football Association) El Mansoura SC
	DF	Mahmoud Saad	3 March 1952 (aged 28)			(Egyptian Football Association) Zamalek SC
	DF	Maher Hammam	3 October 1956 (aged 23)			(Egyptian Football Association) Al-Ahly
	DF	Fathi Mabrouk	5 July 1951 (aged 28)			(Egyptian Football Association) Al-Ahly
	DF	Samy Mansour	17 October 1949 (aged 30)			(Egyptian Football Association) Zamalek SC
	DF	Mohamed Salah	29 March 1956 (aged 23)			(Egyptian Football Association) Zamalek SC
	DF	Mostafa Younis	25 December 1953 (aged 26)			(Egyptian Football Association) Al-Ahly
	MF	Ramadan El-Sayed	20 March 1957 (aged 22)			(Egyptian Football Association) Factory 36 Club
	MF	Shawky Gharib	26 February 1959 (aged 21)			(Egyptian Football Association) Ghazl El-Mehalla
	MF	Mohamed Amer	23 April 1954 (aged 25)			(Egyptian Football Association) Al-Ahly
	MF	Ahmed Abdel Halim	12 January 1956 (aged 24)			(Egyptian Football Association) Zamalek SC
	MF	Mokhtar Mokhtar	17 August 1954 (aged 25)			(Egyptian Football Association) Al-Ahly
	MF	Saad Soleit	12 May 1958 (aged 21)			(Egyptian Football Association) El Mansoura SC
	FW	Mostafa Abdou	10 June 1953 (aged 26)			(Egyptian Football Association) Al-Ahly
	FW	Mahmoud El Khatib	30 October 1954 (aged 25)			(Egyptian Football Association) Al-Ahly
	FW	Yasser El-Mohamady				(Egyptian Football Association) Esco SC
	FW	Mussad Nur	24 April 1951 (aged 28)			(Egyptian Football Association) Al-Masry Club
	FW	Hassan Shehata	19 June 1947 (aged 32)			(Egyptian Football Association) Zamalek SC

=== Nigeria ===
Coach: (Brazil) Otto Glória

No.	Pos.	Player	Date of birth (age)	Caps	Goals	Club
1	GK	Best Ogedegbe	3 September 1954 (aged 25)			(Nigeria Football Federation) Shooting Stars
2	DF	David Adiele	5 February 1955 (aged 25)			(Nigeria Football Federation) Bendel Insurance
3	DF	Okey Isima	24 August 1956 (aged 23)			(Nigeria Football Federation) Plateau United F.C.
4	MF	Muda Lawal	8 June 1954 (aged 25)			(Nigeria Football Federation) Shooting Stars
5	DF	Christian Chukwu	4 January 1951 (aged 29)			(Nigeria Football Federation) Enugu Rangers
6	DF	Tunde Bamidele	13 May 1953 (aged 26)			(Nigeria Football Federation) Taraba United
7	MF	Segun Odegbami	27 August 1952 (aged 27)			(Nigeria Football Federation) Shooting Stars
8	FW	Aloysius Atuegbu	29 April 1953 (aged 26)			(Nigeria Football Federation) Enugu Rangers
9	MF	Felix Owolabi	24 January 1956 (aged 24)			(Nigeria Football Federation) Shooting Stars
10	MF	Godwin Odiye	17 April 1956 (aged 23)			(United States Soccer Federation) San Francisco Dons
11	FW	Adokiye Amiesimaka	23 November 1956 (aged 23)			(Nigeria Football Federation) Enugu Rangers
12	GK	Moses Effiong	4 October 1959 (aged 20)			(Nigeria Football Federation) Shooting Stars F.C.
13	GK	Emmanuel Okala	17 May 1951 (aged 28)			(Nigeria Football Federation) Enugu Rangers
14	DF	Sylvanus Okpala	5 September 1961 (aged 18)			(Nigeria Football Federation) Enugu Rangers
15	MF	Ifeanyi Onyedika				(Nigeria Football Federation) Enugu Rangers
16	FW	Martins Eyo	4 January 1956 (aged 24)			(Nigeria Football Federation) Julius Berger FC
17	DF	John Orlando	15 October 1960 (aged 19)			(Nigeria Football Federation) Shooting Stars F.C.
18	FW	Shefiu Mohamed	20 May 1956 (aged 23)			(Nigeria Football Federation) Racca Rovers
19	FW	Charles Bassey				(Nigeria Football Federation) Calabar Rovers
20	MF	Henry Nwosu	14 June 1963 (aged 16)			(Nigeria Football Federation) New Nigeria Bank
21	FW	Franck Onwuachi	10 November 1955 (aged 24)			(Nigeria Football Federation) ACB Lagos
22	DF	Kadiri Ikhana	31 December 1951 (aged 28)			(Nigeria Football Federation) Bendel Insurance

=== Tanzania ===
Coach: (Poland) Sławomir Wolk

No.	Pos.	Player	Date of birth (age)	Caps	Goals	Club
	GK	Athumani Mambosasa				(Tanzania Football Federation) Simba S.C.
	GK	Juma Pondamali	9 October 1962 (aged 17)			(Tanzania Football Federation) Pan African FC
	DF	Tasso Mukebezi	1 October 1953 (aged 26)			(Tanzania Football Federation) Balimi Kagera
	DF	Leodgar Tenga	23 September 1955 (aged 24)			(Tanzania Football Federation) Pan African FC
	DF	Jella Mtagwa				(Tanzania Football Federation) Young Africans S.C.
	DF	Mohamed Kajole	1951			(Tanzania Football Federation) Simba S.C.
	MF	Hussein Ngulungu				(Tanzania Football Federation) Moro United F.C.
	MF	Mtemi Ramadhan				(Tanzania Football Federation) Waziri Mkuu
	MF	Juma Mkambi	1955			(Tanzania Football Federation) Young Africans S.C.
	MF	Omar Hussein				(Tanzania Football Federation) Young Africans S.C.
	FW	Mohamed Massewa				(Tanzania Football Federation)
	FW	Thuwein Waziri				(Tanzania Football Federation) Simba S.C.
	FW	Peter Tino	1956			(Tanzania Football Federation) Pan African FC
	MF	Ahmed Thabit				(Tanzania Football Federation) Young Africans S.C.
	MF	Charles Boniface	10 April 1955 (aged 24)			(Tanzania Football Federation) Young Africans S.C.
	DF	Salim Amir				(Tanzania Football Federation) Coastal Union F.C.

== Group B ==
=== Algeria ===
Coach: (Socialist Federal Republic of Yugoslavia) Zdravko Rajkov and Mahieddine Khalef

No.	Pos.	Player	Date of birth (age)	Caps	Goals	Club
1	GK	Mehdi Cerbah	3 April 1953 (aged 26)			(Algerian Football Federation) JE Tizi Ouzou
2	DF	Mahmoud Guendouz	4 February 1953 (aged 27)			(Algerian Football Federation) MA Hussein Dey
3	DF	Mustapha Kouici	16 April 1954 (aged 25)			(Algerian Football Federation) CM Belcourt
4	DF	Mohamed Khedis	21 February 1952 (aged 28)			(Algerian Football Federation) MA Hussein Dey
5	DF	Chaabane Merzekane	18 March 1959 (aged 20)			(Algerian Football Federation) MA Hussein Dey
6	MF	Bouzid Mahyouz	13 January 1952 (aged 28)			(Algerian Football Federation) MP Alger
7	FW	Rabah Madjer	15 December 1958 (aged 21)			(Algerian Football Federation) MA Hussein Dey
8	MF	Ali Fergani (c)	21 September 1952 (aged 27)			(Algerian Football Federation) JE Tizi Ouzou
9	FW	Tedj Bensaoula	1 December 1954 (aged 25)			(Algerian Football Federation) MP Oran
10	MF	Lakhdar Belloumi	29 December 1958 (aged 21)			(Algerian Football Federation) MP Alger
11	FW	Salah Assad	13 March 1958 (aged 21)			(Algerian Football Federation) RS Kouba
12	DF	Salah Larbès	16 September 1952 (aged 27)			(Algerian Football Federation) JE Tizi Ouzou
13	MF	Mohamed Ouamar Ghrib	24 January 1960 (aged 20)			(Algerian Football Federation) DNC Alger
15	FW	Redouane Guemri	30 November 1956 (aged 23)			(Algerian Football Federation) ASC Oran
16	FW	Hocine Benmiloudi	31 January 1955 (aged 25)			(Algerian Football Federation) CM Belcourt
18	MF	Smaïl Slimani	31 December 1956 (aged 23)			(Algerian Football Federation) USK Alger
19	DF	Abdelkader Horr	10 November 1953 (aged 26)			(Algerian Football Federation) DNC Alger
20	DF	Abderrahmane Derouaz	12 December 1955 (aged 24)			(Algerian Football Federation) USK Alger
21	GK	Abderrazak Harb	11 March 1950 (aged 29)			(Algerian Football Federation) DNC Alger

=== Ghana ===
Coach: Fred Osam-Duodu

No.	Pos.	Player	Date of birth (age)	Caps	Goals	Club
	GK	Mohammad Ayomo				(Ghana Football Association)
	GK	Joseph Carr				(Ghana Football Association) Asante Kotoko
	GK	Samuel Suppey				(Ghana Football Association) Hearts of Oak
	DF	Isaac Acquaye				(Ghana Football Association) Dumas Boys
	DF	Emmanuel Ofei Ansah	6 June 1953 (aged 26)			(Ghana Football Association) Hearts of Oak
	DF	James Kuuku Dadzie				(Ghana Football Association) Sekondi Hasaacas
	DF	Joe Gyekye				(Ghana Football Association)
	DF	Justice Moore				(Ghana Football Association)
	DF	Hesse Odamtten	5 February 1959 (aged 21)			(Ghana Football Association) Hearts of Oak
	DF	Charles Oppong				(Ghana Football Association) Asante Kotoko
	DF	Haruna Yusif				(Ghana Football Association) Asante Kotoko
	MF	Adolf Armah				(Ghana Football Association) Hearts of Oak
	MF	Kingston Asabir				(Ghana Football Association) Hearts of Oak
	MF	Kuntu Blankson				(Ghana Football Association) SS-1974
	MF	Francis Kumi	1959			(Ghana Football Association) Asante Kotoko
	MF	Emmanuel Quarshie	6 May 1953 (aged 26)			(Ghana Football Association) Sekondi Hasaacas
	MF	Anas Seydou				(Ghana Football Association) Hearts of Oak
	MF	John Nketia Yawson				(Ghana Football Association) Hearts of Oak
	FW	Papa Arko	2 June 1960 (aged 19)			(Ghana Football Association) Asante Kotoko
	FW	Opoku Afriyie	29 January 1945 (aged 35)			(Ghana Football Association) Asante Kotoko
	FW	Dan Kayede				(Ghana Football Association) Great Olympics
	FW	Willie Klutse	17 May 1955 (aged 24)			(Ghana Football Association) Dumas Boys

=== Guinea ===
Coach: Diélimory Diabaté [[]]

No.	Pos.	Player	Date of birth (age)	Caps	Goals	Club
1	GK	Abdoulaye Keita	28 September 1954 (aged 25)			(Guinean Football Federation) Hafia
9	FW	Fodé Ba Fofana	14 December 1961 (aged 18)			(Guinean Football Federation) Hafia
13	DF	Alseny Diaby				(Guinean Football Federation) Hafia
2	DF	Ibrahima Sory Touré				(Guinean Football Federation)
5	DF	Moussa Camara				(Guinean Football Federation) Hafia
7	FW	Papa Camara	1951			(Guinean Football Federation) Hafia
15	MF	Ibrahima Diawara				(Guinean Football Federation)
8	MF	Mohammed Cheikh Keita				(Guinean Football Federation)
22	FW	Mory Koné				(Guinean Football Federation)
11	MF	Amara Touré				(Guinean Football Federation)
9	FW	Seydouba Bangoura				(Guinean Football Federation) Hafia
14	FW	Sekouba Touré				(Guinean Football Federation)
13	FW	Bengally Sylla	1951			(Guinean Football Federation) Hafia
2	DF	Djibril Diarra				(Guinean Football Federation)
20	MF	Sekou Sylla				(Guinean Football Federation)
21	MF	Salifou Keita	8 October 1959 (aged 20)			(Guinean Football Federation) Hafia

=== Morocco ===
Coach: Mohamed Hamidouche and Mohamed Jabrane

No.	Pos.	Player	Date of birth (age)	Caps	Goals	Club
	GK	Badou Ezzaki	2 April 1959 (aged 20)			(Royal Moroccan Football Federation) Wydad AC
	GK	Abdellatif Laalou	20 February 1952 (aged 28)			(Royal Moroccan Football Federation) AS Salé
	GK	Ejjilali Rounaq	20 March 1958 (aged 21)			(Royal Moroccan Football Federation) RS Settat
	DF	Houssine Bouchkhachekh				(Royal Moroccan Football Federation) MC Oujda
	DF	Mbarek El Filali	12 May 1955 (aged 24)			(Royal Moroccan Football Federation) MC Oujda
	DF	Essedik Hannoun				(Royal Moroccan Football Federation) RS Settat
	DF	Ahmed Limane (c)	1951			(Royal Moroccan Football Federation) MAS Fes
	DF	Mustapha Tahiri	8 July 1953 (aged 26)			(Royal Moroccan Football Federation) MC Oujda
	DF	Abdelillah Marzak	2 May 1957 (aged 22)			(Royal Moroccan Football Federation)
	MF	Saïd Benzemouri				(Royal Moroccan Football Federation) Wydad AC
	MF	Aziz Bouderbala	26 December 1960 (aged 19)			(Royal Moroccan Football Federation) Wydad AC
	MF	Abdelaziz Daidi				(Royal Moroccan Football Federation) CODM Meknes
	MF	Abdellatif Houmama	1 December 1956 (aged 23)			(Royal Moroccan Football Federation) Kénitra AC
	MF	Mohamed Timoumi	15 January 1960 (aged 20)			(Royal Moroccan Football Federation) Union de Touarga
	MF	Mohamed Mouhou	18 September 1955 (aged 24)			(Royal Moroccan Football Federation) AS Salé
	FW	Khalid Labied	24 August 1955 (aged 24)			(Royal Moroccan Football Federation) Fath US
	FW	Jamal Jebrane	20 August 1957 (aged 22)			(Royal Moroccan Football Federation) Kénitra AC
	FW	Abdelmajid Shaita	19 January 1955 (aged 25)			(Royal Moroccan Football Federation) Wydad AC
	FW	Mohamed Bentaibi				(Royal Moroccan Football Federation)
	FW	Mohamed Loukhaili				(Royal Moroccan Football Federation)
