= 1980 African Cup of Nations final =

- Event: 1980 African Cup of Nations
| Nigeria | Algeria |
| (Nigeria) | (Algeria) |
| 3 | 0 |
- Date: 22 March 1980
- Venue: Surulere Stadium, Lagos
- Referee: Tesfaye Gebreyesus (Ethiopia)
- Attendance: 85,000

The 1980 African Cup of Nations final was a football match that took place on 22 March 1980, at the National Stadium in Lagos, Nigeria, to determine the winner of the 1980 African Cup of Nations. Nigeria defeated Algeria 3–0 with two goals from Segun Odegbami and a goal from Muda Lawal, to win their first African Cup.

== Road to the final ==
| Nigeria | | Algeria | |
| Opponents | Results | Opponents | Results |
Group stage
| Tanzania | 3–1 | Ghana | 0–0 |
| Ivory Coast | 0–0 | Morocco | 1–0 |
| Egypt | 1–0 | Guinea | 3–2 |
Semi-finals
| Morocco | 1–0 | Egypt | 2–2 (4–2 p) |

== Match ==
=== Details ===
22 March 1980
--:-- UTC+1

| Nigeria | 3–0 | Algeria |
|---|---|---|
| Odegbami 2', 42'; Lawal 50' | Report |

Surulere Stadium, Lagos
Attendance: 85,000
Referee: Tesfaye Gebreyesus (Ethiopia)

| Nigeria | Algeria |

| GK | 1 | Best Ogedegbe |
| RB | 2 | David Adiele |
| CB | 5 | Christian Chukwu |
| CB | 6 | Tunde Bamidele |
| LB | 8 | Alloysius Atuegbu |
| CM | 10 | Godwin Odiye | (substituted off) 59' |
| CM | 9 | Felix Owolabi |
| AM | 3 | Okey Isima |
| AM | 7 | Segun Odegbami |
| CF | 4 | Muda Lawal |
| CF | 11 | Adokiye Amiesimaka |
Substitutions:
| DF | 22 | Kadiri Ikhana | (substituted on) 59' |
| | 12 | Moses Effiong |
| GK | 13 | Emmanuel Okala |
| MF | 14 | Sylvanus Okpala |
| | 15 | Ifeanyi Onyedika |
| | 16 | Martin Eyo |
| | 17 | John Orlando |
| | 18 | Shefiu Mohammed |
| | 19 | Charles Bassey |
| MF | 20 | Henry Nwosu |
| | 21 | Franck Onwuachi |
Manager:
(Brazil) Otto Glória

| GK | 1 | Mehdi Cerbah |
| LB | 3 | Mustapha Kouici |
| CB | 4 | Mohamed Khedis |
| CB | 19 | Abdelkader Horr |
| RB | 5 | Chaabane Merzekane |
| CM | 6 | Bouzid Mahyouz |
| CM | 8 | Ali Fergani |
| CM | 10 | Lakhdar Belloumi |
| LW | 11 | Salah Assad |
| CF | 9 | Tedj Bensaoula | (substituted off) 66' |
| RW | 16 | Hocine Benmiloudi | (substituted off) 60' |
Substitutions:
| GK | | Abderrazak Harb |
| DF | | Abderrahmane Derouaz |
| DF | | Mahmoud Guendouz |
| DF | | Salah Larbès |
| MF | | Mohamed Ouamar Ghrib |
| FW | | Redouane Guemri | (substituted on) 60' |
| FW | 7 | Rabah Madjer | (substituted on) 66' |
| FW | | Smaïl Slimani |
Manager:
(Socialist Federal Republic of Yugoslavia) Zdravko Rajkov (Algeria) Mahieddine Khalef

Assistant referees:
...
...
