= Football at the 1978 All-Africa Games – Men's team squads =

Below are the squads for the Football at the 1978 All-Africa Games, hosted by Algiers, Algeria, and which took place between 13 and 28 July 1978.

== Group A ==
=== Algeria ===
Head coach: Rachid Mekhloufi

No.	Pos.	Player	Date of birth (age)	Club
1	GK	Mehdi Cerbah	3 January 1953 (aged 25)	(Algerian Football Federation) JE Tizi Ouzou
2	MF	Rachid Baris	22 March 1952 (aged 26)	(Algerian Football Federation) JE Tizi Ouzou
3	DF	Abdelmalek Ali Messaoud	17 January 1955 (aged 23)	(Algerian Football Federation) USK Alger
4	DF	Djamel Keddou	30 January 1952 (aged 26)	(Algerian Football Federation) USK Alger
6	MF	Ali Bencheikh	9 January 1955 (aged 23)	(Algerian Football Federation) MP Alger
7	MF	Abdelkader Ighili	15 April 1953 (aged 25)	(Algerian Football Federation) CM Belcourt
8	DF	Mustapha Kouici	16 April 1954 (aged 24)	(Algerian Football Federation) CM Belcourt
9	DF	Abdelkader Horr	10 November 1953 (aged 24)	(Algerian Football Federation) DNC Alger
10	FW	Kamel Aouis	18 May 1952 (aged 26)	(Algerian Football Federation) JE Tizi Ouzou
11	FW	Salah Assad	10 June 1958 (aged 20)	(Algerian Football Federation) RS Kouba
12	MF	Abdelaziz Safsafi	14 February 1954 (aged 24)	(Algerian Football Federation) RS Kouba
13	DF	Miloud Hadefi	12 March 1949 (aged 29)	(Algerian Football Federation) MP Oran
14	DF	Bouzid Mahiouz	13 January 1952 (aged 26)	(Algerian Football Federation) MP Alger
16	FW	Omar Betrouni (captain)	3 November 1949 (aged 28)	(Algerian Football Federation) MP Alger
17	MF	Sid Ahmed Belkedrouci	20 December 1950 (aged 27)	(Algerian Football Federation) MP Oran
20	GK	Abderrazak Harb	13 March 1950 (aged 28)	(Algerian Football Federation) DNC Alger
	GK	Mohamed Rahmani	10 December 1958 (aged 19)	(Algerian Football Federation) EP Sétif
	MF	Lyès Bahbouh	6 April 1957 (aged 21)	(Algerian Football Federation) JE Tizi Ouzou
	FW	Redouane Guemri	30 November 1956 (aged 21)	(Algerian Football Federation) ASC Oran
	FW	Rabah Madjer	15 December 1958 (aged 19)	(Algerian Football Federation) MA Hussein Dey
	FW	Derradji Bendjaballah	23 November 1959 (aged 18)	(Algerian Football Federation) EP Sétif

=== Egypt ===
Head coach: Taha Ismail

No.	Pos.	Player	Date of birth (age)	Club
	GK	Thabet El-Batal	16 September 1953 (aged 24)	(Egyptian Football Association) Al-Ahly
	GK	Adel El-Maamour	30 November 1954 (aged 23)	(Egyptian Football Association) Zamalek
	DF	Samy Mansour		(Egyptian Football Association) Zamalek
	DF	Mihai Osman		(Egyptian Football Association) Al-Ittihad Alexandria
	DF	Mohamed Bedeir		
	MF	Mahmoud El Khawaga		(Egyptian Football Association) Zamalek
	MF	Taha Basry	2 October 1946 (aged 31)	(Egyptian Football Association) Zamalek
	MF	Hamdi Nouh		(Egyptian Football Association) El-Mokawloon El-Arab
	MF	Sabri El-Menyawi		
	MF	Ramadan El-Sayed		(Egyptian Football Association) Factory 36 Club
	MF	Mahmoud El Khatib	30 October 1954 (aged 23)	(Egyptian Football Association) Al-Ahly
	MF	Mokhtar Mokhtar	17 August 1952 (aged 25)	(Egyptian Football Association) Al-Ahly
	FW	Mohamed "Hamama" Abdallah	1 January 1954 (aged 24)	(Egyptian Football Association) Zamalek
	FW	Omar Abdallah		(Egyptian Football Association) Ghazl El-Mahalla

=== Libya ===
Head coach:

No.	Pos.	Player	Date of birth (age)	Club
	GK	Mohammad Lagha		(Libyan Football Federation) Al-Ittihad Tripoli
	DF	Saleh Sola	1955	(Libyan Football Federation) Al-Ahli Tripoli
	DF	Abu Bakr Bani	25 October 1957 (aged 20)	(Libyan Football Federation) Al-Ittihad Tripoli
	MF	Fawzi Al-Issawi	27 February 1960 (aged 18)	(Libyan Football Federation) Al-Nasr Benghazi
	FW	Naser Belhaj		(Libyan Football Federation) Al-Madina
	FW	Youssef Al-Shoushan		(Libyan Football Federation) Al-Ahli Tripoli
	FW	Basheer Al-Rayani	1955	(Libyan Football Federation) Al-Ittihad Tripoli
		Mohammad Al-Aib		(Libyan Football Federation) Al-Ittihad Tripoli
		Fathi Soltan	13 August 1953 (aged 24)	(Libyan Football Federation) Al-Ittihad Derna
		Ali Ibrahim Al-Shoushan		

== Group B ==
=== Cameroon ===
Head coach:

No.	Pos.	Player	Date of birth (age)	Club
	GK	Joseph-Antoine Bell	8 October 1954 (aged 23)	(Cameroonian Football Federation) Union Douala
	DF	Augustin Tatchoum		
	DF	Ibrahim Aoudou	23 August 1955 (aged 22)	(Cameroonian Football Federation) Canon Yaoundé
	DF	Jacques Ename		(Cameroonian Football Federation) Tonnerre Yaoundé
	DF	Paul N'Lend		(Cameroonian Football Federation) Tonnerre Yaoundé
	MF	Jean-Daniel Eboué		(Cameroonian Football Federation) Canon Yaoundé
	MF	Jean-Pierre Djemba	20 June 1950 (aged 28)	
	MF	Théophile Abega	9 July 1954 (aged 24)	(Cameroonian Football Federation) Canon Yaoundé
	MF	Guy Jacques Manga		
	FW	Gustave "Zibinoh" Fouda-Zibi	27 October 1956 (aged 21)	(Cameroonian Football Federation) Tonnerre Yaoundé
	FW	Ismael Pierre "Solo" Beb		(Cameroonian Football Federation) Union Douala

=== Nigeria ===
Head coach: C. A. Alakija and Lekan Salami

No.	Pos.	Player	Date of birth (age)	Club
	GK	Emmanuel Okala	17 May 1951 (aged 27)	(Nigeria Football Federation) Enugu Rangers
	GK	Best Ogedegbe	3 September 1954 (aged 23)	(Nigeria Football Federation) Shooting Stars
	DF	Annas Ahmed		
	DF	Christian Chukwu	4 January 1951 (aged 27)	(Nigeria Football Federation) Enugu Rangers
	DF	Godwin Odiye	17 April 1956 (aged 22)	(Nigeria Football Federation) National Bank of Lagos
	DF	Tunde Bamidele	13 May 1953 (aged 25)	(Nigeria Football Federation) Taraba United
	MF	Felix Owolabi	24 January 1956 (aged 22)	(Nigeria Football Federation) Shooting Stars
	MF	Muda Lawal	8 June 1954 (aged 24)	(Nigeria Football Federation) Shooting Stars
	MF	Shefiu Mohammed	20 May 1956 (aged 22)	
	MF	Christopher Ogu		(Nigeria Football Federation) Bendel Insurance
	FW	Segun Odegbami	27 August 1952 (aged 25)	(Nigeria Football Federation) Shooting Stars
	FW	Aloysius Atuegbu	29 April 1953 (aged 25)	(Nigeria Football Federation) Enugu Rangers
	FW	Thompson Usiyan	27 April 1956 (aged 22)	(United States Soccer Federation) AS Mountaineers
	FW	Adokiye Amiesimaka	23 November 1956 (aged 21)	(Nigeria Football Federation) Enugu Rangers
