= 1982 FIFA World Cup squads =

The 1982 FIFA World Cup took place in Spain from 13 June to 11 July 1982. Each of the 24 participating nations had to submit a squad of no more than 22 players, three of whom had to be goalkeepers. The El Salvador squad comprised just 20 players.

== Group 1 ==
=== Cameroon ===
Head coach: (France) Jean Vincent

No.	Pos.	Player	Date of birth (age)	Caps	Club
1	GK	Thomas N'Kono (captain)	20 July 1956 (aged 25)	39	(Cameroon) Canon Yaoundé
2	DF	Michel Kaham	1 June 1952 (aged 30)	0	(France) Stade Quimperois
3	DF	Edmond Enoka	17 December 1955 (aged 26)	?	(Cameroon) Dragon Douala
4	DF	René N'Djeya	9 October 1953 (aged 28)	0	(Cameroon) Union Douala
5	DF	Elie Onana	13 October 1951 (aged 30)	0	(Cameroon) Fédéral SFC du Noun
6	DF	Emmanuel Kundé	15 July 1956 (aged 25)	19	(Cameroon) Canon Yaoundé
7	MF	Ephrem M'Bom	18 July 1954 (aged 27)	0	(Cameroon) Canon Yaoundé
8	MF	Grégoire M'Bida	27 January 1955 (aged 27)	0	(Cameroon) Canon Yaoundé
9	FW	Roger Milla	20 May 1952 (aged 30)	34	(France) Bastia
10	MF	Jean-Pierre Tokoto	26 January 1948 (aged 34)	0	(United States) Philadelphia Fever
11	MF	Charles Toubé	22 January 1958 (aged 24)	0	(Cameroon) Tonnerre Yaoundé
12	GK	Joseph-Antoine Bell	8 October 1954 (aged 27)	0	(Ivory Coast) Africa Sports
13	FW	Paul Bahoken	7 July 1955 (aged 26)	0	(France) Cannes
14	MF	Théophile Abega	9 July 1954 (aged 27)	0	(Cameroon) Canon Yaoundé
15	DF	François N'Doumbé	30 January 1954 (aged 28)	31	(Cameroon) Union Douala
16	DF	Ibrahim Aoudou	23 August 1955 (aged 26)	21	(France) Cannes
17	MF	Joseph Kamga	25 July 1957 (aged 24)	?	(Cameroon) Union Douala
18	FW	Jacques N'Guea	8 November 1955 (aged 26)	0	(Cameroon) Canon Yaoundé
19	MF	Joseph Enanga	28 August 1958 (aged 23)	?	(Cameroon) Union Douala
20	FW	Oscar Eyobo	23 October 1961 (aged 20)	0	(Cameroon) Dynamo Douala
21	FW	Ernest Ebongué	15 May 1962 (aged 20)	6	(Cameroon) Tonnerre Yaoundé
22	GK	Simon Tchobang	31 August 1951 (aged 30)	?	(Cameroon) Dynamo Douala

=== Italy ===
Head coach: Enzo Bearzot

No.	Pos.	Player	Date of birth (age)	Caps	Club
1	GK	Dino Zoff (captain)	28 February 1942 (aged 40)	99	(Italy) Juventus
2	DF	Franco Baresi	8 May 1960 (aged 22)	0	(Italy) Milan
3	DF	Giuseppe Bergomi	22 December 1963 (aged 18)	1	(Italy) Internazionale
4	DF	Antonio Cabrini	8 October 1957 (aged 24)	33	(Italy) Juventus
5	DF	Fulvio Collovati	9 May 1957 (aged 25)	26	(Italy) Milan
6	DF	Claudio Gentile	27 September 1953 (aged 28)	56	(Italy) Juventus
7	DF	Gaetano Scirea	25 May 1953 (aged 29)	49	(Italy) Juventus
8	DF	Pietro Vierchowod	6 April 1959 (aged 23)	2	(Italy) Fiorentina
9	MF	Giancarlo Antognoni	1 April 1954 (aged 28)	60	(Italy) Fiorentina
10	MF	Giuseppe Dossena	2 May 1958 (aged 24)	9	(Italy) Torino
11	MF	Giampiero Marini	25 February 1951 (aged 31)	11	(Italy) Internazionale
12	GK	Ivano Bordon	13 April 1951 (aged 31)	13	(Italy) Internazionale
13	MF	Gabriele Oriali	25 November 1952 (aged 29)	20	(Italy) Internazionale
14	MF	Marco Tardelli	24 September 1954 (aged 27)	55	(Italy) Juventus
15	MF	Franco Causio	1 February 1949 (aged 33)	58	(Italy) Udinese
16	MF	Bruno Conti	13 March 1955 (aged 27)	13	(Italy) Roma
17	FW	Daniele Massaro	23 May 1961 (aged 21)	1	(Italy) Fiorentina
18	FW	Alessandro Altobelli	28 November 1955 (aged 26)	10	(Italy) Internazionale
19	FW	Francesco Graziani	16 December 1952 (aged 29)	53	(Italy) Fiorentina
20	FW	Paolo Rossi	23 September 1956 (aged 25)	20	(Italy) Juventus
21	FW	Franco Selvaggi	15 May 1953 (aged 29)	3	(Italy) Cagliari
22	GK	Giovanni Galli	29 April 1958 (aged 24)	0	(Italy) Fiorentina

Note: With the exception of the goalkeepers, who were assigned the traditional shirt numbers for the role (1, 12 and 22) the Italian team was numbered alphabetically within their respective positions – Defenders (from 2 to 8), Midfielders (from 9 to 14), Wingers (from 15 to 17) and Forwards (from 18 to 21).

=== Peru ===
Head coach: (Brazil) Tim

No.	Pos.	Player	Date of birth (age)	Caps	Club
1	GK	Eusebio Acasuzo	8 April 1952 (aged 30)	2	(Peru) Universitario
2	DF	Jaime Duarte	27 February 1955 (aged 27)	7	(Peru) Alianza Lima
3	DF	Salvador Salguero	10 August 1951 (aged 30)	0	(Peru) Alianza Lima
4	DF	Hugo Gastulo	9 January 1958 (aged 24)	0	(Peru) Universitario
5	MF	Germán Leguía	2 January 1954 (aged 28)	3	(Peru) Universitario
6	MF	José Velásquez	4 June 1952 (aged 30)	52	(Colombia) Independiente Medellín
7	FW	Gerónimo Barbadillo	24 September 1952 (aged 29)	3	(Mexico) UANL
8	MF	César Cueto	16 June 1952 (aged 29)	9	(Colombia) Atlético Nacional
9	MF	Julio César Uribe	9 May 1958 (aged 24)	0	(Peru) Sporting Cristal
10	MF	Teófilo Cubillas	8 March 1949 (aged 33)	78	(United States) Fort Lauderdale Strikers
11	FW	Juan Carlos Oblitas	16 February 1951 (aged 31)	44	(Belgium) Seraing
12	GK	José González	10 July 1954 (aged 27)	0	(Peru) Alianza Lima
13	MF	Oscar Arizaga	20 August 1957 (aged 24)	?	(Peru) Atlético Chalaco
14	MF	Miguel Gutiérrez	19 November 1956 (aged 25)	?	(Peru) Sporting Cristal
15	DF	Rubén Toribio Díaz (captain)	17 April 1952 (aged 30)	60	(Peru) Sporting Cristal
16	DF	Jorge Olaechea	27 August 1956 (aged 25)	2	(Peru) Alianza Lima
17	FW	Franco Navarro	10 November 1961 (aged 20)	0	(Peru) Deportivo Municipal
18	MF	Eduardo Malásquez	13 October 1957 (aged 24)	0	(Peru) Deportivo Municipal
19	FW	Guillermo La Rosa	6 June 1952 (aged 30)	8	(Colombia) Atlético Nacional
20	FW	Percy Rojas	16 September 1949 (aged 32)	49	(Belgium) Seraing
21	GK	Ramón Quiroga	23 July 1950 (aged 31)	8	(Peru) Sporting Cristal
22	MF	Luis Reyna	16 May 1959 (aged 23)	0	(Peru) Sporting Cristal

=== Poland ===
Head coach: Antoni Piechniczek

No.	Pos.	Player	Date of birth (age)	Caps	Club
1	GK	Józef Młynarczyk	20 September 1953 (aged 28)	10	(Poland) Widzew Łódź
2	DF	Marek Dziuba	19 December 1955 (aged 26)	44	(Poland) ŁKS Łódź
3	MF	Janusz Kupcewicz	9 December 1955 (aged 26)	10	(Poland) Arka Gdynia
4	DF	Tadeusz Dolny	7 May 1958 (aged 24)	4	(Poland) Górnik Zabrze
5	DF	Paweł Janas	4 March 1953 (aged 29)	40	(Poland) Legia Warsaw
6	DF	Piotr Skrobowski	16 October 1961 (aged 20)	14	(Poland) Wisła Kraków
7	DF	Jan Jałocha	18 July 1957 (aged 24)	8	(Poland) Wisła Kraków
8	MF	Waldemar Matysik	27 September 1961 (aged 20)	10	(Poland) Górnik Zabrze
9	DF	Władysław Żmuda (captain)	6 June 1954 (aged 28)	72	(Poland) Widzew Łódź
10	DF	Stefan Majewski	31 January 1956 (aged 26)	17	(Poland) Legia Warsaw
11	FW	Włodzimierz Smolarek	16 July 1957 (aged 24)	12	(Poland) Widzew Łódź
12	DF	Roman Wójcicki	8 January 1958 (aged 24)	12	(Poland) Śląsk Wrocław
13	MF	Andrzej Buncol	21 September 1959 (aged 22)	9	(Poland) Legia Warsaw
14	MF	Andrzej Pałasz	22 July 1960 (aged 21)	14	(Poland) Górnik Zabrze
15	FW	Włodzimierz Ciołek	24 March 1956 (aged 26)	12	(Poland) Stal Mielec
16	FW	Grzegorz Lato	8 April 1950 (aged 32)	92	(Belgium) Lokeren
17	FW	Andrzej Szarmach	3 October 1950 (aged 31)	59	(France) Auxerre
18	FW	Marek Kusto	29 April 1954 (aged 28)	15	(Poland) Legia Warsaw
19	FW	Andrzej Iwan	10 November 1959 (aged 22)	19	(Poland) Wisła Kraków
20	FW	Zbigniew Boniek	3 March 1956 (aged 26)	50	(Poland) Widzew Łódź
21	GK	Jacek Kazimierski	17 August 1959 (aged 22)	4	(Poland) Legia Warsaw
22	GK	Piotr Mowlik	21 April 1951 (aged 31)	21	(Poland) Lech Poznań

== Group 2 ==
=== Algeria ===
Head coaches: Mahieddine Khalef and Rachid Mekhloufi

No.	Pos.	Player	Date of birth (age)	Caps	Club
1	GK	Mehdi Cerbah	3 April 1953 (aged 29)	46	(Algeria) RS Kouba
2	DF	Mahmoud Guendouz	24 February 1953 (aged 29)	33	(Algeria) MA Hussein Dey
3	DF	Mustapha Kouici	16 April 1954 (aged 28)	?	(Algeria) MA Hussein Dey
4	DF	Noureddine Kourichi	12 April 1954 (aged 28)	0	(France) Bordeaux
5	DF	Chaâbane Merzekane	8 March 1959 (aged 23)	4	(Algeria) MA Hussein Dey
6	FW	Ali Bencheikh	9 January 1955 (aged 27)	?	(Algeria) MP Alger
7	FW	Salah Assad	13 March 1958 (aged 24)	48	(Algeria) RS Kouba
8	MF	Ali Fergani (captain)	21 September 1952 (aged 29)	45	(Algeria) JE Tizi Ouzou
9	FW	Tedj Bensaoula	1 December 1954 (aged 27)	23	(Algeria) MP Oran
10	MF	Lakhdar Belloumi	29 December 1958 (aged 23)	42	(Algeria) GCR Mascara
11	FW	Rabah Madjer	15 December 1958 (aged 23)	31	(Algeria) MA Hussein Dey
12	MF	Salah Larbès	16 September 1952 (aged 29)	4	(Algeria) JE Tizi Ouzou
13	MF	Hocine Yahi	25 April 1960 (aged 22)	7	(Algeria) CM Belcourt
14	FW	Djamel Zidane	28 April 1955 (aged 27)	0	(Belgium) Kortrijk
15	MF	Mustapha Dahleb	8 February 1952 (aged 30)	0	(France) Paris Saint-Germain
16	DF	Faouzi Mansouri	17 January 1956 (aged 26)	0	(France) Montpellier
17	DF	Abdelkader Horr	10 November 1953 (aged 28)	?	(Algeria) DNC Alger
18	MF	Karim Maroc	5 March 1958 (aged 24)	0	(France) Tours
19	MF	Djamel Tlemçani	16 April 1955 (aged 27)	0	(France) Reims
20	FW	Abdelmajid Bourebbou	16 March 1951 (aged 31)	0	(France) Laval
21	GK	Mourad Amara	19 February 1959 (aged 23)	4	(Algeria) JE Tizi Ouzou
22	GK	Yacine Bentalaa	24 September 1955 (aged 26)	?	(Algeria) MA Hussein Dey

=== Austria ===
Head coaches: Felix Latzke and Georg Schmidt

No.	Pos.	Player	Date of birth (age)	Caps	Club
1	GK	Friedrich Koncilia	25 February 1948 (aged 34)	60	Austria Wien
2	DF	Bernd Krauss	8 May 1957 (aged 25)	5	(Austria) Rapid Wien
3	DF	Erich Obermayer (captain)	23 January 1953 (aged 29)	35	Austria Wien
4	DF	Josef Degeorgi	19 January 1960 (aged 22)	3	(Austria) Admira/Wacker
5	DF	Bruno Pezzey	3 February 1955 (aged 27)	53	(West Germany) Eintracht Frankfurt
6	MF	Roland Hattenberger	7 December 1948 (aged 33)	47	(Austria) SSW Innsbruck
7	FW	Walter Schachner	1 February 1957 (aged 25)	33	(Italy) Cesena
8	MF	Herbert Prohaska	8 August 1955 (aged 26)	57	(Italy) Internazionale
9	FW	Hans Krankl	14 February 1953 (aged 29)	61	(Austria) Rapid Wien
10	MF	Reinhold Hintermaier	14 February 1956 (aged 26)	10	(West Germany) 1. FC Nürnberg
11	MF	Kurt Jara	14 October 1950 (aged 31)	55	(Switzerland) Grasshopper
12	DF	Anton Pichler	4 October 1955 (aged 26)	5	(Austria) Sturm Graz
13	FW	Max Hagmayr	16 November 1956 (aged 25)	6	(Austria) VÖEST Linz
14	MF	Ernst Baumeister	22 January 1957 (aged 25)	11	Austria Wien
15	MF	Johann Dihanich	24 October 1958 (aged 23)	8	Austria Wien
16	DF	Gerald Messlender	1 October 1961 (aged 20)	0	(Austria) Admira/Wacker
17	DF	Johann Pregesbauer	9 June 1955 (aged 27)	4	(Austria) Rapid Wien
18	FW	Gernot Jurtin	9 September 1955 (aged 26)	5	(Austria) Sturm Graz
19	DF	Heribert Weber	28 June 1955 (aged 26)	27	(Austria) Rapid Wien
20	FW	Kurt Welzl	6 November 1954 (aged 27)	19	(Spain) Valencia
21	GK	Herbert Feurer	14 January 1954 (aged 28)	7	(Austria) Rapid Wien
22	GK	Klaus Lindenberger	28 May 1957 (aged 25)	1	(Austria) LASK

=== Chile ===
Head coach: Luis Santibáñez

No.	Pos.	Player	Date of birth (age)	Caps	Club
1	GK	Oscar Wirth	5 November 1955 (aged 26)	5	(Chile) Cobreloa
2	DF	Lizardo Garrido	25 August 1957 (aged 24)	15	(Chile) Colo-Colo
3	DF	René Valenzuela	20 April 1955 (aged 27)	23	(Chile) Universidad Católica
4	DF	Vladimir Bigorra	9 August 1954 (aged 27)	17	Universidad de Chile
5	DF	Elías Figueroa (captain)	25 October 1946 (aged 35)	44	(Chile) Colo-Colo
6	MF	Rodolfo Dubó	11 September 1953 (aged 28)	27	(Chile) Palestino
7	MF	Eduardo Bonvallet	13 January 1955 (aged 27)	21	(Chile) Universidad Católica
8	MF	Carlos Rivas	24 May 1953 (aged 29)	24	(Chile) Colo-Colo
9	FW	Juan Carlos Letelier	20 May 1959 (aged 23)	5	(Chile) Cobreloa
10	DF	Mario Soto	10 July 1950 (aged 31)	34	(Chile) Cobreloa
11	FW	Gustavo Moscoso	10 August 1955 (aged 26)	18	(Chile) Universidad Católica
12	GK	Marco Cornez	15 October 1957 (aged 24)	0	(Chile) Palestino
13	FW	Carlos Caszely	5 July 1950 (aged 31)	42	(Chile) Colo-Colo
14	MF	Raúl Ormeño	21 June 1958 (aged 23)	1	(Chile) Colo-Colo
15	FW	Patricio Yáñez	20 January 1961 (aged 21)	23	(Chile) San Luis
16	MF	Manuel Rojas	13 June 1954 (aged 28)	27	(Chile) Universidad Católica
17	DF	Oscar Rojas	15 November 1958 (aged 23)	1	(Chile) Colo-Colo
18	DF	Mario Galindo	10 August 1951 (aged 30)	28	(Chile) Colo-Colo
19	DF	Enzo Escobar	10 November 1951 (aged 30)	26	(Chile) Cobreloa
20	MF	Miguel Ángel Neira	9 October 1952 (aged 29)	23	(Chile) Universidad Católica
21	FW	Miguel Ángel Gamboa	21 June 1951 (aged 30)	14	Universidad de Chile
22	GK	Mario Osbén	14 July 1950 (aged 31)	26	(Chile) Colo-Colo

=== West Germany ===
Head coach: Jupp Derwall

No.	Pos.	Player	Date of birth (age)	Caps	Club
1	GK	Harald Schumacher	6 March 1954 (aged 28)	25	(West Germany) 1. FC Köln
2	DF	Hans-Peter Briegel	11 October 1955 (aged 26)	27	(West Germany) 1. FC Kaiserslautern
3	DF	Paul Breitner	5 September 1951 (aged 30)	41	(West Germany) Bayern Munich
4	DF	Karlheinz Förster	25 July 1958 (aged 23)	35	(West Germany) VfB Stuttgart
5	DF	Bernd Förster	3 May 1956 (aged 26)	15	(West Germany) VfB Stuttgart
6	MF	Wolfgang Dremmler	12 July 1954 (aged 27)	11	(West Germany) Bayern Munich
7	MF	Pierre Littbarski	16 April 1960 (aged 22)	7	(West Germany) 1. FC Köln
8	FW	Klaus Fischer	27 December 1949 (aged 32)	39	(West Germany) 1. FC Köln
9	FW	Horst Hrubesch	17 April 1951 (aged 31)	16	(West Germany) Hamburger SV
10	MF	Hansi Müller	27 July 1957 (aged 24)	34	(West Germany) VfB Stuttgart
11	FW	Karl-Heinz Rummenigge (captain)	25 September 1955 (aged 26)	52	(West Germany) Bayern Munich
12	DF	Wilfried Hannes	17 May 1957 (aged 25)	7	(West Germany) Borussia Mönchengladbach
13	FW	Uwe Reinders	19 January 1955 (aged 27)	1	(West Germany) Werder Bremen
14	MF	Felix Magath	26 July 1953 (aged 28)	20	(West Germany) Hamburger SV
15	DF	Uli Stielike	15 November 1954 (aged 27)	23	(Spain) Real Madrid
16	FW	Thomas Allofs*	17 November 1959 (aged 22)	0	(West Germany) Fortuna Düsseldorf
17	MF	Stephan Engels*	6 September 1960 (aged 21)	3	(West Germany) 1. FC Köln
18	MF	Lothar Matthäus	21 March 1961 (aged 21)	7	(West Germany) Borussia Mönchengladbach
19	DF	Holger Hieronymus*	22 February 1959 (aged 23)	2	(West Germany) Hamburger SV
20	DF	Manfred Kaltz	6 January 1953 (aged 29)	59	(West Germany) Hamburger SV
21	GK	Bernd Franke	12 February 1948 (aged 34)	7	(West Germany) Eintracht Braunschweig
22	GK	Eike Immel	27 November 1960 (aged 21)	4	(West Germany) Borussia Dortmund

- Although players marked with an * (Allofs, Engels and Hieronymus) were on the list, they did not travel to Spain and stayed in West Germany as reserves, waiting if Derwall would require their services. However, he did not need them.

== Group 3 ==
=== Argentina ===
Head coach: César Luis Menotti

No.	Pos.	Player	Date of birth (age)	Caps	Club
1	MF	Osvaldo Ardiles	3 August 1952 (aged 29)	45	(England) Tottenham Hotspur
2	GK	Héctor Baley	16 November 1950 (aged 31)	10	(Argentina) Talleres de Córdoba
3	MF	Juan Barbas	23 August 1959 (aged 22)	21	(Argentina) Racing
4	FW	Daniel Bertoni	14 March 1955 (aged 27)	25	(Italy) Fiorentina
5	FW	Gabriel Calderón	7 February 1960 (aged 22)	3	(Argentina) Independiente
6	FW	Ramón Díaz	29 August 1959 (aged 22)	18	(Argentina) River Plate
7	GK	Ubaldo Fillol	21 July 1950 (aged 31)	37	(Argentina) River Plate
8	DF	Luis Galván	24 February 1948 (aged 34)	25	(Argentina) Talleres de Córdoba
9	MF	Américo Gallego	25 April 1955 (aged 27)	69	(Argentina) River Plate
10	MF	Diego Maradona	30 October 1960 (aged 21)	29	(Argentina) Boca Juniors
11	FW	Mario Kempes	15 July 1954 (aged 27)	38	(Argentina) River Plate
12	MF	Patricio Hernández	16 August 1956 (aged 25)	10	(Argentina) Estudiantes
13	DF	Julio Olarticoechea	18 October 1958 (aged 23)	0	(Argentina) River Plate
14	DF	Jorge Olguín	17 May 1952 (aged 30)	55	(Argentina) Independiente
15	DF	Daniel Passarella (captain)	25 May 1953 (aged 29)	54	(Argentina) River Plate
16	GK	Nery Pumpido	30 July 1957 (aged 24)	0	(Argentina) Veléz Sársfield
17	FW	Santiago Santamaría	22 August 1952 (aged 29)	8	(Argentina) Newell's Old Boys
18	DF	Alberto Tarantini	3 December 1955 (aged 26)	56	(Argentina) River Plate
19	DF	Enzo Trossero	23 May 1953 (aged 29)	5	(Argentina) Independiente
20	FW	Jorge Valdano	4 October 1955 (aged 26)	5	(Spain) Zaragoza
21	MF	José Daniel Valencia	3 October 1955 (aged 26)	38	(Argentina) Talleres de Córdoba
22	DF	José Van Tuyne	13 December 1954 (aged 27)	10	(Argentina) Racing

Note that this squad is numbered alphabetically by surname, unlike traditional numbering systems where the goalkeeper has shirt number 1 and so forth. However, Diego Maradona and Patricio Hernández were swapped round to give Maradona his favoured 10.

=== Belgium ===
Head coach: Guy Thys

No.	Pos.	Player	Date of birth (age)	Caps	Club
1	GK	Jean-Marie Pfaff	4 December 1953 (aged 28)	28	(Belgium) Beveren
2	DF	Eric Gerets (captain)	18 May 1954 (aged 28)	38	(Belgium) Standard Liège
3	DF	Luc Millecamps	10 September 1951 (aged 30)	24	(Belgium) KSV Waregem
4	DF	Walter Meeuws	11 July 1951 (aged 30)	32	(Belgium) Standard Liège
5	DF	Michel Renquin	3 November 1955 (aged 26)	34	(Belgium) Anderlecht
6	FW	Franky Vercauteren	28 October 1956 (aged 25)	18	(Belgium) Anderlecht
7	MF	Jos Daerden	26 November 1954 (aged 27)	1	(Belgium) Standard Liège
8	MF	Wilfried Van Moer	1 March 1945 (aged 37)	54	(Belgium) Beveren
9	FW	Erwin Vandenbergh	26 January 1959 (aged 23)	18	(Belgium) Lierse
10	MF	Ludo Coeck	25 September 1955 (aged 26)	29	(Belgium) Anderlecht
11	MF	Jan Ceulemans	28 February 1957 (aged 25)	28	(Belgium) Club Brugge
12	GK	Theo Custers	10 August 1950 (aged 31)	9	(Spain) Espanyol
13	FW	François Van der Elst	1 December 1954 (aged 27)	36	(England) West Ham United
14	DF	Marc Baecke	24 July 1956 (aged 25)	6	(Belgium) Beveren
15	DF	Maurits De Schrijver	26 June 1951 (aged 30)	1	(Belgium) Lokeren
16	DF	Gerard Plessers	30 March 1959 (aged 23)	7	(Belgium) Standard Liège
17	MF	René Verheyen	20 March 1952 (aged 30)	18	(Belgium) Lokeren
18	FW	Raymond Mommens	27 December 1958 (aged 23)	10	(Belgium) Lokeren
19	MF	Marc Millecamps	9 October 1950 (aged 31)	5	(Belgium) KSV Waregem
20	MF	Guy Vandersmissen	25 December 1957 (aged 24)	0	(Belgium) Standard Liège
21	FW	Alexandre Czerniatynski	28 July 1960 (aged 21)	6	(Belgium) Antwerp
22	GK	Jacky Munaron	8 September 1956 (aged 25)	0	(Belgium) Anderlecht

Jos Daerden was a replacement for René Vandereycken at the last moment due to an injury of the latter.

=== El Salvador ===
Head coach: Mauricio Rodríguez

No.	Pos.	Player	Date of birth (age)	Caps	Club
1	GK	Luis Guevara Mora	2 September 1961 (aged 20)	0	(El Salvador) Platense Municipal
2	DF	Mario Castillo	30 October 1951 (aged 30)	0	(El Salvador) Santiagueño
3	DF	José Francisco Jovel	26 May 1951 (aged 31)	0	(El Salvador) Águila
4	DF	Carlos Recinos	30 June 1950 (aged 31)	0	(El Salvador) FAS
5	DF	Ramón Fagoaga	12 January 1952 (aged 30)	0	(El Salvador) Atlético Marte
6	MF	Joaquín Ventura	27 October 1956 (aged 25)	0	(El Salvador) Santiagueño
7	MF	Silvio Aquino	30 June 1949 (aged 32)	?	(Guatemala) Deportivo Jalapa
8	MF	José Luis Rugamas	5 June 1953 (aged 29)	0	(El Salvador) Atlético Marte
9	FW	Ever Hernández	11 December 1958 (aged 23)	0	(El Salvador) Santiagueño
10	MF	Norberto Huezo (captain)	6 June 1956 (aged 26)	0	(El Salvador) Atlético Marte
11	FW	Jorge González	13 March 1958 (aged 24)	0	(El Salvador) FAS
12	DF	Francisco Osorto	20 March 1957 (aged 25)	0	(El Salvador) Santiagueño
13	FW	José María Rivas	12 May 1958 (aged 24)	0	(El Salvador) Independiente de San Vicente
14	FW	Luis Ramírez Zapata	6 January 1954 (aged 28)	0	(El Salvador) Atlético Marte
15	DF	Jaime Rodríguez	17 January 1959 (aged 23)	0	(West Germany) Bayer Uerdingen
16	MF	Mauricio Alfaro	13 February 1956 (aged 26)	0	(El Salvador) Platense Municipal
17	FW	Guillermo Ragazzone	5 January 1956 (aged 26)	?	(El Salvador) Atlético Marte
18	DF	Miguel Ángel Díaz	27 January 1957 (aged 25)	0	(El Salvador) CD Chalatenango
19	GK	Eduardo Hernández	31 January 1958 (aged 24)	?	(El Salvador) Santiagueño
20	GK	José Luis Munguía	28 October 1959 (aged 22)	?	(El Salvador) FAS

- Only 20 players in El Salvador's squad.

=== Hungary ===
Head coach: Kálmán Mészöly

No.	Pos.	Player	Date of birth (age)	Caps	Club
1	GK	Ferenc Mészáros	11 April 1950 (aged 32)	25	(Portugal) Sporting CP
2	DF	Győző Martos	15 December 1949 (aged 32)	27	(Belgium) Waterschei Thor
3	DF	László Bálint	1 February 1948 (aged 34)	74	(France) Toulouse
4	DF	József Tóth	2 December 1951 (aged 30)	47	(Hungary) Újpest
5	MF	Sándor Müller	21 September 1948 (aged 33)	15	(Spain) Hércules
6	DF	Imre Garaba	29 July 1958 (aged 23)	17	(Hungary) Budapest Honvéd
7	FW	László Fazekas	15 October 1947 (aged 34)	87	(Belgium) Antwerp
8	FW	Tibor Nyilasi (captain)	18 January 1955 (aged 27)	49	(Hungary) Ferencváros
9	FW	András Törőcsik	1 May 1955 (aged 27)	33	(Hungary) Újpest
10	FW	László Kiss	12 March 1956 (aged 26)	24	(Hungary) Vasas
11	FW	Gábor Pölöskei	11 October 1960 (aged 21)	6	(Hungary) Ferencváros
12	FW	Lázár Szentes	12 December 1955 (aged 26)	1	(Hungary) Győr
13	DF	Tibor Rab	2 October 1955 (aged 26)	19	(Hungary) Ferencváros
14	DF	Sándor Sallai	26 March 1960 (aged 22)	8	(Hungary) Debrecen
15	FW	Béla Bodonyi	14 September 1956 (aged 25)	13	(Hungary) Budapest Honvéd
16	MF	Ferenc Csongrádi	29 March 1956 (aged 26)	13	(Hungary) Videoton
17	MF	Károly Csapó	23 February 1952 (aged 30)	17	(Hungary) Tatabányai Bányász
18	DF	Attila Kerekes	4 April 1954 (aged 28)	10	(Hungary) Békéscsabai Előre
19	DF	József Varga	9 October 1954 (aged 27)	9	(Hungary) Budapest Honvéd
20	DF	József Csuhay	12 July 1957 (aged 24)	0	(Hungary) Videoton
21	GK	Béla Katzirz	27 July 1953 (aged 28)	15	(Hungary) Pécs
22	GK	Imre Kiss	10 August 1957 (aged 24)	0	(Hungary) Tatabányai Bányász

== Group 4 ==
=== Czechoslovakia ===
Head coach: Jozef Vengloš

No.	Pos.	Player	Date of birth (age)	Caps	Club
1	GK	Stanislav Seman	8 August 1952 (aged 29)	14	(Czechoslovakia) Lokomotiva Košice
2	DF	František Jakubec	12 April 1956 (aged 26)	11	(Czechoslovakia) Bohemians Praha
3	DF	Jan Fiala	19 May 1956 (aged 26)	22	(Czechoslovakia) Dukla Prague
4	DF	Ladislav Jurkemik	20 July 1953 (aged 28)	48	(Czechoslovakia) Inter Bratislava
5	DF	Jozef Barmoš	28 August 1954 (aged 27)	49	(Czechoslovakia) Inter Bratislava
6	DF	Rostislav Vojáček	23 February 1949 (aged 33)	38	(Czechoslovakia) Baník Ostrava
7	MF	Ján Kozák	17 April 1954 (aged 28)	54	(Czechoslovakia) Dukla Prague
8	MF	Antonín Panenka	2 December 1948 (aged 33)	57	(Austria) Rapid Wien
9	FW	Ladislav Vízek	22 January 1955 (aged 27)	34	(Czechoslovakia) Dukla Prague
10	FW	Tomáš Kříž	17 March 1959 (aged 23)	5	(Czechoslovakia) Dukla Prague
11	FW	Zdeněk Nehoda (captain)	9 May 1952 (aged 30)	86	(Czechoslovakia) Dukla Prague
12	MF	Přemysl Bičovský	18 August 1950 (aged 31)	39	(Czechoslovakia) Bohemians Praha
13	MF	Jan Berger	27 November 1955 (aged 26)	13	(Czechoslovakia) Sparta Prague
14	DF	Libor Radimec	22 May 1950 (aged 32)	15	(Czechoslovakia) Baník Ostrava
15	DF	Jozef Kukučka	13 March 1957 (aged 25)	4	(Czechoslovakia) Plastika Nitra
16	MF	Pavel Chaloupka	4 May 1959 (aged 23)	1	(Czechoslovakia) Bohemians Praha
17	MF	František Štambachr	13 February 1953 (aged 29)	24	(Czechoslovakia) Dukla Prague
18	FW	Petr Janečka	25 November 1957 (aged 24)	15	(Czechoslovakia) Zbrojovka Brno
19	FW	Marián Masný	13 August 1950 (aged 31)	73	(Czechoslovakia) Slovan Bratislava
20	FW	Vlastimil Petržela	20 July 1953 (aged 28)	0	(Czechoslovakia) Slavia Prague
21	GK	Zdeněk Hruška	25 July 1954 (aged 27)	15	(Czechoslovakia) Bohemians Praha
22	GK	Karel Stromšík	12 April 1958 (aged 24)	2	(Czechoslovakia) Dukla Prague

=== England ===
Head coach: Ron Greenwood

No.	Pos.	Player	Date of birth (age)	Caps	Club
1	GK	Ray Clemence	5 August 1948 (aged 33)	59	(England) Tottenham Hotspur
2	DF	Viv Anderson	29 August 1956 (aged 25)	10	(England) Nottingham Forest
3	MF	Trevor Brooking	2 October 1948 (aged 33)	46	(England) West Ham United
4	DF	Terry Butcher	28 December 1958 (aged 23)	4	(England) Ipswich Town
5	MF	Steve Coppell	9 July 1955 (aged 26)	36	(England) Manchester United
6	DF	Steve Foster	24 September 1957 (aged 24)	2	(England) Brighton & Hove Albion
7	FW	Kevin Keegan	14 February 1951 (aged 31)	62	(England) Southampton
8	FW	Trevor Francis	19 April 1954 (aged 28)	27	(England) Manchester City
9	MF	Glenn Hoddle	27 October 1957 (aged 24)	11	(England) Tottenham Hotspur
10	MF	Terry McDermott	8 December 1951 (aged 30)	25	(England) Liverpool
11	FW	Paul Mariner	22 May 1953 (aged 29)	21	(England) Ipswich Town
12	DF	Mick Mills (captain)	4 January 1949 (aged 33)	37	(England) Ipswich Town
13	GK	Joe Corrigan	18 November 1948 (aged 33)	9	(England) Manchester City
14	DF	Phil Neal	20 February 1951 (aged 31)	37	(England) Liverpool
15	MF	Graham Rix	23 October 1957 (aged 24)	8	(England) Arsenal
16	MF	Bryan Robson	11 January 1957 (aged 25)	19	(England) Manchester United
17	DF	Kenny Sansom	26 September 1958 (aged 23)	23	(England) Arsenal
18	DF	Phil Thompson	21 January 1954 (aged 28)	35	(England) Liverpool
19	MF	Ray Wilkins	14 September 1956 (aged 25)	47	(England) Manchester United
20	FW	Peter Withe	30 August 1951 (aged 30)	6	(England) Aston Villa
21	FW	Tony Woodcock	6 December 1955 (aged 26)	22	(West Germany) 1. FC Köln
22	GK	Peter Shilton	18 September 1949 (aged 32)	37	(England) Nottingham Forest

Note that this squad is numbered alphabetically by surname, unlike traditional numbering systems. Despite this, the goalkeepers are given the usual England goalkeepers' numbers 1, 13 & 22 (again alphabetically) and Kevin Keegan is given his favoured 7.

=== France ===
Head coach: Michel Hidalgo

No.	Pos.	Player	Date of birth (age)	Caps	Club
1	GK	Dominique Baratelli	26 December 1947 (aged 34)	21	(France) Paris Saint-Germain
2	DF	Manuel Amoros	1 February 1962 (aged 20)	4	(France) Monaco
3	DF	Patrick Battiston	12 March 1957 (aged 25)	19	(France) Saint-Étienne
4	DF	Maxime Bossis	26 June 1955 (aged 26)	37	(France) Nantes
5	DF	Gérard Janvion	21 August 1953 (aged 28)	32	(France) Saint-Étienne
6	DF	Christian Lopez	15 March 1953 (aged 29)	35	(France) Saint-Étienne
7	DF	Philippe Mahut	4 March 1956 (aged 26)	4	(France) Metz
8	DF	Marius Trésor	15 January 1950 (aged 32)	53	(France) Bordeaux
9	MF	Bernard Genghini	18 January 1958 (aged 24)	8	(France) Sochaux
10	MF	Michel Platini (captain)	21 June 1955 (aged 26)	35	(France) Saint-Étienne
11	MF	René Girard	4 April 1954 (aged 28)	2	(France) Bordeaux
12	MF	Alain Giresse	2 August 1952 (aged 29)	14	(France) Bordeaux
13	MF	Jean-François Larios	27 August 1956 (aged 25)	15	(France) Saint-Étienne
14	MF	Jean Tigana	23 June 1955 (aged 26)	13	(France) Bordeaux
15	FW	Bruno Bellone	14 March 1962 (aged 20)	6	(France) Monaco
16	FW	Alain Couriol	24 October 1958 (aged 23)	7	(France) Monaco
17	FW	Bernard Lacombe	15 August 1952 (aged 29)	29	(France) Bordeaux
18	FW	Dominique Rocheteau	14 January 1955 (aged 27)	24	(France) Paris Saint-Germain
19	FW	Didier Six	21 August 1954 (aged 27)	36	(West Germany) VfB Stuttgart
20	FW	Gérard Soler	29 March 1954 (aged 28)	7	(France) Bordeaux
21	GK	Jean Castaneda	20 March 1957 (aged 25)	7	(France) Saint-Étienne
22	GK	Jean-Luc Ettori	29 July 1955 (aged 26)	2	(France) Monaco

Note: This squad is numbered alphabetically within the players' positions, while the goalkeepers have been given numbers 1, 21 and 22 (also alphabetically). The exception is Michel Platini, who was given his favoured number 10.

=== Kuwait ===
Head coach: (Brazil) Carlos Alberto Parreira

No.	Pos.	Player	Date of birth (age)	Caps	Club
1	GK	Ahmed Al-Tarabulsi	22 March 1947 (aged 35)	4	Kuwait SC
2	DF	Naeem Saad	1 October 1957 (aged 24)	0	(Kuwait) Al Tadamun
3	DF	Mahboub Juma'a	17 September 1955 (aged 26)	4	(Kuwait) Al-Salmiya
4	DF	Jamal Al-Qabendi	7 April 1959 (aged 23)	3	(Kuwait) Kazma
5	DF	Waleed Al-Jasem	18 November 1959 (aged 22)	4	Kuwait SC
6	MF	Saad Al-Houti (captain)	24 May 1954 (aged 28)	4	Kuwait SC
7	FW	Fathi Kameel	23 May 1955 (aged 27)	0	(Kuwait) Al Tadamun
8	FW	Abdullah Al-Buloushi	16 February 1960 (aged 22)	3	(Kuwait) Al-Arabi
9	FW	Jasem Yaqoub	25 October 1953 (aged 28)	4	(Kuwait) Al-Qadsia
10	FW	Abdulaziz Al-Anberi	3 January 1954 (aged 28)	0	Kuwait SC
11	MF	Nassir Al-Ghanem	4 April 1961 (aged 21)	?	(Kuwait) Kazma
12	MF	Yussef Al-Suwayed	20 September 1958 (aged 23)	2	(Kuwait) Kazma
13	DF	Mubarak Marzouq	1 January 1961 (aged 21)	?	(Kuwait) Al Tadamun
14	DF	Abdullah Mayouf	3 December 1953 (aged 28)	0	(Kuwait) Kazma
15	DF	Sami Al-Hashash	15 September 1959 (aged 22)	2	(Kuwait) Al-Arabi
16	FW	Faisal Al-Dakhil	13 August 1957 (aged 24)	4	(Kuwait) Al-Qadsia
17	DF	Hamoud Al-Shemmari	26 September 1960 (aged 21)	4	(Kuwait) Kazma
18	MF	Mohammed Karam	1 January 1955 (aged 27)	0	(Kuwait) Al-Arabi
19	FW	Muayad Al-Haddad	1 January 1960 (aged 22)	?	(Kuwait) Khaitan
20	FW	Abdulaziz Al-Buloushi	4 December 1962 (aged 19)	?	(Kuwait) Al-Qadsia
21	GK	Adam Marjan	23 September 1957 (aged 24)	?	(Kuwait) Kazma
22	GK	Jasem Bahman	15 February 1958 (aged 24)	?	(Kuwait) Al-Qadsia

== Group 5 ==
=== Honduras ===
Head coach: José de la Paz Herrera

No.	Pos.	Player	Date of birth (age)	Caps	Club
1	GK	Salomón Nazar	7 September 1953 (aged 28)	?	(Honduras) Universidad
2	DF	Efraín Gutiérrez	7 May 1954 (aged 28)	0	(Honduras) Universidad
3	DF	Jaime Villegas	5 July 1950 (aged 31)	0	(Honduras) Real España
4	DF	Fernando Bulnes	21 October 1946 (aged 35)	0	(Honduras) Olimpia
5	DF	Allan Costly	13 December 1954 (aged 27)	0	(Honduras) Real España
6	MF	Ramón Maradiaga (captain)	30 October 1954 (aged 27)	0	(Honduras) Motagua
7	FW	Eduardo Laing	27 December 1958 (aged 23)	0	(Honduras) Platense
8	MF	Francisco Toledo	30 September 1959 (aged 22)	?	(Honduras) Marathón
9	FW	Porfirio Betancourt	10 October 1957 (aged 24)	0	(Honduras) Real España
10	FW	José Figueroa	15 December 1959 (aged 22)	0	(Honduras) Vida
11	MF	David Bueso	5 May 1955 (aged 27)	?	(Honduras) Motagua
12	DF	Domingo Drummond	14 April 1957 (aged 25)	0	(Honduras) Platense
13	MF	Prudencio Norales	20 April 1956 (aged 26)	0	(Honduras) Olimpia
14	MF	Juan Cruz	24 June 1959 (aged 22)	0	(Honduras) Universidad
15	DF	Héctor Zelaya	12 July 1957 (aged 24)	0	(Honduras) Motagua
16	FW	Roberto Bailey	10 August 1952 (aged 29)	?	(Honduras) Marathón
17	DF	José Cruz	12 June 1949 (aged 33)	0	(Honduras) Motagua
18	MF	Carlos Caballero	5 December 1958 (aged 23)	0	(Honduras) Real España
19	FW	Celso Güity	7 August 1955 (aged 26)	?	(Honduras) Marathón
20	MF	Gilberto Yearwood	15 March 1956 (aged 26)	0	(Spain) Valladolid
21	GK	Julio Arzú	5 June 1954 (aged 28)	0	(Honduras) Real España
22	GK	James Steward	9 December 1946 (aged 35)	?	(Honduras) Real España

=== Northern Ireland ===
Head coach: Billy Bingham

No.	Pos.	Player	Date of birth (age)	Caps	Club
1	GK	Pat Jennings	12 June 1945 (aged 37)	91	(England) Arsenal
2	DF	Jimmy Nicholl	28 February 1956 (aged 26)	43	(Canada) Toronto Blizzard
3	DF	Mal Donaghy	13 September 1957 (aged 24)	12	(England) Luton Town
4	MF	David McCreery	16 September 1957 (aged 24)	39	(United States) Tulsa Roughnecks
5	DF	Chris Nicholl	12 October 1946 (aged 35)	41	(England) Southampton
6	DF	John O'Neill	11 March 1958 (aged 24)	17	(England) Leicester City
7	FW	Noel Brotherston	18 November 1956 (aged 25)	14	(England) Blackburn Rovers
8	MF	Martin O'Neill (captain)	1 March 1952 (aged 30)	44	(England) Norwich City
9	FW	Gerry Armstrong	23 May 1954 (aged 28)	37	(England) Watford
10	FW	Sammy McIlroy	2 August 1954 (aged 28)	49	(England) Stoke City
11	FW	Billy Hamilton	9 May 1957 (aged 25)	16	(England) Burnley
12	DF	John McClelland	7 December 1955 (aged 26)	10	(Scotland) Rangers
13	DF	Sammy Nelson	1 April 1949 (aged 33)	49	(England) Brighton & Hove Albion
14	MF	Tommy Cassidy	18 November 1950 (aged 31)	23	(England) Burnley
15	MF	Tommy Finney	6 November 1952 (aged 29)	15	(England) Cambridge United
16	FW	Norman Whiteside	7 May 1965 (aged 17)	0	(England) Manchester United
17	GK	Jim Platt	26 January 1952 (aged 30)	15	(England) Middlesbrough
18	MF	Johnny Jameson	11 March 1958 (aged 24)	0	(Northern Ireland) Glentoran
19	FW	Felix Healy	27 September 1955 (aged 26)	2	(Northern Ireland) Coleraine
20	MF	Jim Cleary	27 May 1956 (aged 26)	2	(Northern Ireland) Glentoran
21	FW	Bobby Campbell	13 September 1956 (aged 25)	2	(England) Bradford City
22	GK	George Dunlop	16 January 1956 (aged 26)	0	(Northern Ireland) Linfield

=== Spain ===
Head coach: (Uruguay) (Spain) José Santamaría

No.	Pos.	Player	Date of birth (age)	Caps	Club
1	GK	Luis Arconada (captain)	26 June 1954 (aged 27)	39	(Spain) Real Sociedad
2	DF	José Antonio Camacho	8 June 1955 (aged 27)	29	(Spain) Real Madrid
3	DF	Rafael Gordillo	24 February 1957 (aged 25)	29	(Spain) Real Betis
4	MF	Periko Alonso	1 February 1953 (aged 29)	15	(Spain) Real Sociedad
5	DF	Miguel Tendillo	1 February 1961 (aged 21)	20	(Spain) Valencia
6	DF	José Ramón Alexanko	19 May 1956 (aged 26)	29	(Spain) Barcelona
7	FW	Juanito	10 November 1954 (aged 27)	30	(Spain) Real Madrid
8	MF	Joaquín	9 June 1956 (aged 26)	12	(Spain) Sporting Gijón
9	FW	Jesús María Satrústegui	12 January 1954 (aged 28)	28	(Spain) Real Sociedad
10	MF	Jesús María Zamora	1 January 1955 (aged 27)	26	(Spain) Real Sociedad
11	FW	Roberto López Ufarte	19 April 1958 (aged 24)	11	(Spain) Real Sociedad
12	DF	Santiago Urquiaga	14 April 1958 (aged 24)	2	(Spain) Athletic Bilbao
13	DF	Manuel Jiménez	27 October 1956 (aged 25)	1	(Spain) Sporting Gijón
14	DF	Antonio Maceda	16 May 1957 (aged 25)	3	(Spain) Sporting Gijón
15	MF	Enrique Saura	2 August 1954 (aged 27)	19	(Spain) Valencia
16	MF	Tente Sánchez	8 October 1956 (aged 25)	8	(Spain) Barcelona
17	MF	Ricardo Gallego	8 February 1959 (aged 23)	3	(Spain) Real Madrid
18	FW	Pedro Uralde	2 March 1958 (aged 24)	1	(Spain) Real Sociedad
19	FW	Santillana	23 August 1952 (aged 29)	32	(Spain) Real Madrid
20	FW	Quini	23 September 1949 (aged 32)	32	(Spain) Barcelona
21	GK	Urruti	17 February 1952 (aged 30)	5	(Spain) Barcelona
22	GK	Miguel Ángel	24 December 1947 (aged 34)	18	(Spain) Real Madrid

=== Yugoslavia ===
Head coach: Miljan Miljanić

No.	Pos.	Player	Date of birth (age)	Caps	Club
1	GK	Dragan Pantelić	9 December 1951 (aged 30)	15	(France) Bordeaux
2	DF	Ive Jerolimov	30 March 1958 (aged 24)	5	(Socialist Federal Republic of Yugoslavia) Rijeka
3	MF	Ivan Gudelj	21 September 1960 (aged 21)	5	(Socialist Federal Republic of Yugoslavia) Hajduk Split
4	DF	Velimir Zajec	12 February 1956 (aged 26)	19	(Socialist Federal Republic of Yugoslavia) Dinamo Zagreb
5	DF	Nenad Stojković	26 May 1956 (aged 26)	19	(Socialist Federal Republic of Yugoslavia) Partizan
6	DF	Zlatko Krmpotić	7 August 1958 (aged 23)	5	(Socialist Federal Republic of Yugoslavia) Red Star Belgrade
7	MF	Vladimir Petrović	1 July 1955 (aged 26)	30	(Socialist Federal Republic of Yugoslavia) Red Star Belgrade
8	MF	Edhem Šljivo	16 March 1950 (aged 32)	9	(France) Nice
9	DF	Zoran Vujović	26 August 1958 (aged 23)	11	(Socialist Federal Republic of Yugoslavia) Hajduk Split
10	FW	Zvonko Živković	31 October 1959 (aged 22)	0	(Socialist Federal Republic of Yugoslavia) Partizan
11	FW	Zlatko Vujović	26 August 1958 (aged 23)	16	(Socialist Federal Republic of Yugoslavia) Hajduk Split
12	GK	Ivan Pudar	16 August 1961 (aged 20)	0	(Socialist Federal Republic of Yugoslavia) Hajduk Split
13	FW	Safet Sušić	13 April 1955 (aged 27)	21	(Socialist Federal Republic of Yugoslavia) Sarajevo
14	DF	Nikola Jovanović	18 September 1952 (aged 29)	4	(Socialist Federal Republic of Yugoslavia) Budućnost Titograd
15	DF	Miloš Hrstić	20 November 1955 (aged 26)	9	(Socialist Federal Republic of Yugoslavia) Rijeka
16	FW	Miloš Šestić	8 August 1956 (aged 25)	8	(Socialist Federal Republic of Yugoslavia) Red Star Belgrade
17	MF	Jurica Jerković	25 February 1950 (aged 32)	43	(Switzerland) Zürich
18	FW	Stjepan Deverić	20 August 1961 (aged 20)	0	(Socialist Federal Republic of Yugoslavia) Dinamo Zagreb
19	FW	Vahid Halilhodžić	15 October 1952 (aged 29)	12	(France) Nantes
20	MF	Ivica Šurjak (captain)	23 March 1953 (aged 29)	51	(France) Paris Saint-Germain
21	MF	Predrag Pašić	18 October 1958 (aged 23)	5	(Socialist Federal Republic of Yugoslavia) Sarajevo
22	GK	Ratko Svilar	6 May 1950 (aged 32)	3	(Belgium) Antwerp

== Group 6 ==
=== Brazil ===
Head coach: Telê Santana

No.	Pos.	Player	Date of birth (age)	Caps	Club
1	GK	Waldir Peres	2 February 1951 (aged 31)	23	(Brazil) São Paulo
2	DF	Leandro	17 March 1959 (aged 23)	6	(Brazil) Flamengo
3	DF	Oscar	20 June 1954 (aged 27)	36	(Brazil) São Paulo
4	DF	Luizinho	22 October 1958 (aged 23)	24	(Brazil) Atlético Mineiro
5	MF	Toninho Cerezo	21 April 1955 (aged 27)	49	(Brazil) Atlético Mineiro
6	DF	Júnior	29 June 1954 (aged 27)	35	(Brazil) Flamengo
7	MF	Paulo Isidoro	3 August 1953 (aged 28)	28	(Brazil) Grêmio
8	MF	Sócrates (captain)	19 February 1954 (aged 28)	33	(Brazil) Corinthians
9	FW	Serginho	23 December 1953 (aged 28)	15	(Brazil) São Paulo
10	MF	Zico	3 March 1953 (aged 29)	56	(Brazil) Flamengo
11	FW	Éder	25 May 1957 (aged 25)	24	(Brazil) Atlético Mineiro
12	GK	Paulo Sérgio	24 July 1954 (aged 27)	3	(Brazil) Botafogo
13	DF	Edevaldo	28 January 1958 (aged 24)	17	(Brazil) Internacional
14	DF	Juninho	29 August 1958 (aged 23)	4	(Brazil) Ponte Preta
15	MF	Falcão	16 October 1953 (aged 28)	17	(Italy) Roma
16	DF	Edinho	5 June 1955 (aged 27)	34	(Brazil) Fluminense
17	DF	Pedrinho	22 October 1957 (aged 24)	8	(Brazil) Vasco da Gama
18	MF	Batista	8 March 1955 (aged 27)	32	(Brazil) Grêmio
19	MF	Renato	21 February 1957 (aged 25)	13	(Brazil) São Paulo
20	FW	Roberto Dinamite	13 April 1954 (aged 28)	32	(Brazil) Vasco da Gama
21	MF	Dirceu	15 June 1952 (aged 29)	23	(Spain) Atlético Madrid
22	GK	Carlos	4 March 1956 (aged 26)	6	(Brazil) Ponte Preta

=== New Zealand ===
Head coach: (England) John Adshead

No.	Pos.	Player	Date of birth (age)	Caps	Club
1	GK	Richard Wilson	8 May 1956 (aged 26)	?	(Australia) Preston Macedonia
2	DF	Glenn Dods	7 July 1957 (aged 24)	0	(Australia) Adelaide City
3	DF	Ricki Herbert	10 April 1961 (aged 21)	0	(New Zealand) Mount Wellington
4	MF	Brian Turner	31 July 1949 (aged 32)	4	(New Zealand) Gisborne City
5	DF	Dave Bright	29 November 1949 (aged 32)	?	(New Zealand) Manurewa
6	DF	Bobby Almond	16 April 1951 (aged 31)	0	(New Zealand) Invercargill Thistle
7	FW	Wynton Rufer	29 December 1962 (aged 19)	9	(New Zealand) Miramar Rangers
8	MF	Duncan Cole	12 July 1958 (aged 23)	0	(New Zealand) Hanimex United
9	FW	Steve Wooddin	16 January 1955 (aged 27)	0	(Australia) South Melbourne
10	MF	Steve Sumner (captain)	2 April 1955 (aged 27)	38	(Australia) West Adelaide Hellas
11	DF	Sam Malcolmson	2 April 1948 (aged 34)	0	(New Zealand) East Coast Bays
12	MF	Keith MacKay	8 December 1956 (aged 25)	0	(New Zealand) Gisborne City
13	MF	Kenny Cresswell	4 June 1958 (aged 24)	0	(New Zealand) Gisborne City
14	DF	Adrian Elrick	29 September 1949 (aged 32)	0	(New Zealand) Hanimex United
15	DF	John Hill	7 January 1950 (aged 32)	0	(New Zealand) Gisborne City
16	DF	Glen Adam	22 May 1959 (aged 23)	?	(New Zealand) Mount Wellington
17	MF	Allan Boath	14 February 1958 (aged 24)	0	(Australia) West Adelaide Hellas
18	MF	Peter Simonsen	17 April 1959 (aged 23)	?	(New Zealand) Manurewa
19	MF	Billy McClure	4 January 1958 (aged 24)	?	(New Zealand) Mount Wellington
20	MF	Grant Turner	7 October 1958 (aged 23)	?	(New Zealand) Gisborne City
21	GK	Barry Pickering	12 December 1956 (aged 25)	?	(New Zealand) Miramar Rangers
22	GK	Frank van Hattum	17 November 1958 (aged 23)	0	(New Zealand) Manurewa

=== Scotland ===
Head coach: Jock Stein

No.	Pos.	Player	Date of birth (age)	Caps	Club
1	GK	Alan Rough	25 November 1951 (aged 30)	48	(Scotland) Partick Thistle
2	DF	Danny McGrain (captain)	1 May 1950 (aged 32)	60	(Scotland) Celtic
3	DF	Frank Gray	27 October 1954 (aged 27)	22	(England) Leeds United
4	MF	Graeme Souness	6 May 1953 (aged 29)	25	(England) Liverpool
5	DF	Alan Hansen	13 June 1955 (aged 27)	14	(England) Liverpool
6	DF	Willie Miller	2 May 1955 (aged 27)	17	(Scotland) Aberdeen
7	MF	Gordon Strachan	9 February 1957 (aged 25)	11	(Scotland) Aberdeen
8	FW	Kenny Dalglish	4 March 1951 (aged 31)	86	(England) Liverpool
9	FW	Alan Brazil	15 June 1959 (aged 22)	7	(England) Ipswich Town
10	MF	John Wark	4 August 1957 (aged 24)	15	(England) Ipswich Town
11	MF	John Robertson	20 January 1953 (aged 29)	21	(England) Nottingham Forest
12	GK	George Wood	26 September 1952 (aged 29)	4	(England) Arsenal
13	DF	Alex McLeish	21 January 1959 (aged 23)	15	(Scotland) Aberdeen
14	DF	David Narey	12 June 1956 (aged 26)	13	(Scotland) Dundee United
15	FW	Joe Jordan	15 December 1951 (aged 30)	51	(Italy) Milan
16	MF	Asa Hartford	24 October 1950 (aged 31)	49	(England) Manchester City
17	DF	Allan Evans	12 October 1956 (aged 25)	3	(England) Aston Villa
18	FW	Steve Archibald	27 September 1956 (aged 25)	14	(England) Tottenham Hotspur
19	FW	Paul Sturrock	10 October 1956 (aged 25)	7	(Scotland) Dundee United
20	MF	Davie Provan	8 May 1956 (aged 26)	10	(Scotland) Celtic
21	DF	George Burley	3 June 1956 (aged 26)	11	(England) Ipswich Town
22	GK	Jim Leighton	24 July 1958 (aged 23)	0	(Scotland) Aberdeen

=== Soviet Union ===
Head coach: Konstantin Beskov

No.	Pos.	Player	Date of birth (age)	Caps	Club
1	GK	Rinat Dasayev	13 June 1957 (aged 25)	21	(Soviet Union) Spartak Moscow
2	DF	Tengiz Sulakvelidze	23 July 1956 (aged 25)	16	(Soviet Union) Dinamo Tbilisi
3	DF	Aleksandr Chivadze (captain)	8 April 1955 (aged 27)	15	(Soviet Union) Dinamo Tbilisi
4	DF	Vagiz Khidiyatullin	3 March 1959 (aged 23)	26	(Soviet Union) CSKA Moscow
5	DF	Sergei Baltacha	17 February 1958 (aged 24)	11	(Soviet Union) Dynamo Kyiv
6	DF	Anatoliy Demyanenko	19 February 1959 (aged 23)	8	(Soviet Union) Dynamo Kyiv
7	FW	Ramaz Shengelia	1 January 1957 (aged 25)	16	(Soviet Union) Dinamo Tbilisi
8	MF	Volodymyr Bessonov	5 March 1958 (aged 24)	32	(Soviet Union) Dynamo Kyiv
9	MF	Yuri Gavrilov	3 May 1953 (aged 29)	28	(Soviet Union) Spartak Moscow
10	MF	Khoren Hovhannisyan	10 January 1955 (aged 27)	17	(Soviet Union) Ararat Yerevan
11	FW	Oleg Blokhin	5 November 1952 (aged 29)	78	(Soviet Union) Dynamo Kyiv
12	MF	Andriy Bal	16 February 1958 (aged 24)	4	(Soviet Union) Dynamo Kyiv
13	MF	Vitaly Daraselia	9 October 1957 (aged 24)	18	(Soviet Union) Dinamo Tbilisi
14	DF	Sergei Borovsky	29 January 1956 (aged 26)	5	(Soviet Union) Dinamo Minsk
15	FW	Sergey Andreyev	16 May 1956 (aged 26)	18	(Soviet Union) SKA Rostov
16	FW	Sergey Rodionov	3 September 1962 (aged 19)	2	(Soviet Union) Spartak Moscow
17	MF	Leonid Buryak	10 July 1953 (aged 28)	43	(Soviet Union) Dynamo Kyiv
18	DF	Yuri Susloparov	14 August 1958 (aged 23)	6	(Soviet Union) Torpedo Moscow
19	MF	Vadym Yevtushenko	1 January 1958 (aged 24)	2	(Soviet Union) Dynamo Kyiv
20	DF	Oleg Romantsev	4 January 1954 (aged 28)	9	(Soviet Union) Spartak Moscow
21	GK	Viktor Chanov	21 July 1959 (aged 22)	1	(Soviet Union) Dynamo Kyiv
22	GK	Vyacheslav Chanov	23 October 1951 (aged 30)	0	(Soviet Union) Torpedo Moscow

== Coaches representation by country ==
Unless specified, coaches were coaching their own national team. Algeria and Austria both had two head coaches. José Santamaría represented both Uruguay and Spain as a player.

Nº	Country	Coaches
3	Brazil	Carlos Alberto Parreira (Kuwait), Telê Santana, Tim (Peru)
2	Algeria	Mahieddine Khalef, Rachid Mekhloufi
2	Austria	Felix Latzke, Georg Schmidt
2	England	John Adshead (New Zealand), Ron Greenwood
2	France	Michel Hidalgo, Jean Vincent (Cameroon)
1	Argentina	César Luis Menotti
1	Belgium	Guy Thys
1	Chile	Luis Santibáñez
1	Czechoslovakia	Jozef Vengloš
1	El Salvador	Mauricio Rodríguez
1	Honduras	José de la Paz Herrera
1	Hungary	Kálmán Mészöly
1	Italy	Enzo Bearzot
1	Northern Ireland	Billy Bingham
1	Poland	Antoni Piechniczek
1	Scotland	Jock Stein
1	Soviet Union	Konstantin Beskov
1	Uruguay	José Santamaría (Spain)
1	West Germany	Jupp Derwall
1	(Socialist Federal Republic of Yugoslavia) Yugoslavia	Miljan Miljanić
