= Zogbo =

Zogbo is a surname. Notable people with the surname include:

- Aristide Zogbo (born 1981), Ivorian footballer
- Séverin Tapé Zogbo (fl. 1976–1980), Ivorian footballer

== See also ==
- Zogba
- Zogby (disambiguation)
