= Paul Okoku =

Nigerian former professional footballer

Personal information
- Full name: Paul Lucky Onyemechi Okoku
- Date of birth: December 27, 1965 (age 60)
- Place of birth: Lagos, Nigeria
- Position: Midfielder

Youth career
- Saint Finbarr's College

Senior career*
Years	Team	Apps	(Gls)
1981	First Bank		
1982	Abiola Babes		
1983	National Bank FC		
1984	Leventis United		
1985–1988	Alabama A&M Bulldogs		

International career
1983	Nigeria U20		
1984	Nigeria		
- * Club domestic league appearances and goals

Paul Lucky Onyemechi Okoku (born 27 December 1965) is a Nigerian former professional footballer who played as a midfielder. He was a prominent member of the Nigeria national team that won silver at the 1984 Africa Cup of Nations. He also served as vice-captain of the Nigeria national under-20 football team at the 1983 FIFA World Youth Championship.

== Early life and education ==
Okoku was born in Lagos, Nigeria, to parents originating from Kwale in Delta State. He attended St Finbarr's College in Akoka, Lagos, where he gained national attention playing secondary school football.

Following his international football career in Nigeria, Okoku relocated to the United States in late 1984 to pursue higher education. He attended Alabama A&M University, playing college soccer for the Alabama A&M Bulldogs while studying business. He subsequently earned a degree in business administration and finance, transitioning into a corporate career as a financial analyst.

== Club career ==
Okoku began his domestic senior career in 1981 with First Bank F.C. in Lagos. In 1982, he moved to Abeokuta to join Abiola Babes. In 1983, he joined National Bank FC to, establishing himself as one of the top young midfielders in the Nigerian league. In 1984, he signed with Leventis United of Ibadan, helping the club during its dominant domestic run prior to his relocation to the United States.

== International career ==
In 1983, Okoku was named vice-captain of the Nigeria national under-20 football team (the Flying Eagles). He featured prominently in the qualification campaign, helping Nigeria defeat Guinea in the final round to secure the nation's first-ever qualification for a FIFA tournament at the 1983 FIFA World Youth Championship in Mexico. Later that year, he led the squad to victory in the Tessema Cup against Ivory Coast.

In 1984, Okoku earned a call-up to the senior national team, then known as the Green Eagles, under head coach Festus Onigbinde. He was selected in the final squad for the 1984 Africa Cup of Nations held in Ivory Coast. He featured in key matches during the tournament, including the group fixture against Algeria and the final against Cameroon, where Nigeria finished as tournament runners-up.

== Later life and philanthropy ==
Following his retirement from sports, Okoku established the Greater Tomorrow Children's Fund (GTCF), a non-profit foundation focused on aiding underprivileged children in Nigeria through educational supplies and school infrastructure. He also helped establish the Association of Ex-Internationals in the Diaspora to assist former Nigerian sports icons facing medical or financial hardship.

In January 2025, Okoku received the Distinguished Conquerors Award from the Saint Finbarr's College Old Boys' Association (SFCOBA) for his contributions to grassroots educational development and alumni welfare.

== Honors ==
=== International ===
Nigeria U-20

- Tessema Cup: 1983

Nigeria

- Africa Cup of Nations runner-up: 1984

=== Individual ===
- Distinguished Conquerors Award – Saint Finbarr's College Old Boys' Association (2024)
- Rotary Humanitarian Merit Service Award

== See also ==
- Nigeria at the Africa Cup of Nations
