= Adiele =

Adiele is both a surname and a given name. Notable people with the name include:

- David Adiele, Nigerian footballer
- Echendu Adiele (1978–2011), Nigerian footballer
- Eric Adiele, better known as Sporting Life, American musician
- Adiele Afigbo (1937–2009), Nigerian historian
