= Die Foneye =

Die Foneye is a surname. Notable people with the surname include:

- Philibert Dié Foneye, Ivorian footballer
- Vincent Die Foneye (born 1979), Ivorian footballer
