= Enugu (disambiguation) =

Enugu may refer to:

- Enugu (city), a city in southeastern Nigeria
- Enugu State, a state in Nigeria
- Enugu Rangers, the home association football team of Enugu State
- Enugu (crater)
