= Zahui =

Zahui is a surname. Notable people with the surname include:

- Laurent Zahui (1960–2021), Ivorian footballer
- Thierry Zahui (born 1987), Ivorian footballer

== See also ==
- Amanda Zahui B. (born 1993), Swedish basketball player
