= Nigeria at the Africa Cup of Nations =

Nigeria have appeared in the finals of the Africa Cup of Nations on twenty occasions. Nigeria has won the cup three times: the first time was in 1980 and they won a second title in the 1994, held in Tunisia.

Nigeria won their third African title in 2013, held in South Africa.

== Overall record ==
Africa Cup of Nations record										Africa Cup of Nations qualification record					
Year	Round	Position	Pld	W	D*	L	GF	GA	Squad	Pld	W	D*	L	GF	GA
(Sudan) 1957	Not affiliated to CAF									Not affiliated to CAF					
(United Arab Republic) 1959	Not affiliated to CAF									Not affiliated to CAF					
(Ethiopia) 1962	Withdrew									4	1	2	1	4	5
(Ghana) 1963	Group stage	6th	2	0	0	2	3	10	Squad	2	0	1	1	2	3
(Tunisia) 1965	Withdrew									Withdrew					
(Ethiopia) 1968	Did not qualify									4	1	1	2	4	5
(Sudan) 1970	Withdrew									Withdrew					
(Cameroon) 1972	Did not qualify									2	0	1	1	1	2
(Egypt) 1974	Did not qualify									4	2	1	1	7	9
(Ethiopia) 1976	Third place	3rd	6	3	1	2	11	10	Squad	2	2	0	0	3	1
(Ghana) 1978	Third place	3rd	5	2	2	1	8	5	Squad	4	2	1	1	7	4
(Nigeria) 1980	Champions	1st	5	4	1	0	8	1	Squad	Qualified as hosts					
(Libya) 1982	Group stage	6th	3	1	0	2	4	5	Squad	Qualified as holders					
(Ivory Coast) 1984	Runners-up	2nd	5	1	3	1	7	8	Squad	4	1	2	1	2	1
(Egypt) 1986	Did not qualify									2	0	1	1	0	1
(Morocco) 1988	Runners-up	2nd	5	1	3	1	5	3	Squad	4	2	1	1	6	3
(Algeria) 1990	Runners-up	2nd	5	3	0	2	5	6	Squad	4	2	2	0	8	2
(Senegal) 1992	Third place	3rd	5	4	0	1	8	5	Squad	8	4	3	1	15	3
(Tunisia) 1994	Champions	1st	5	3	2	0	9	3	Squad	6	3	2	1	12	1
(South Africa) 1996	Withdrew									Qualified as holders					
(Burkina Faso) 1998	Banned									Banned					
(Ghana) (Nigeria) 2000	Runners-up	2nd	6	4	2	0	12	5	Squad	Qualified as hosts					
(Mali) 2002	Third place	3rd	6	3	2	1	4	2	Squad	6	4	2	0	9	1
(Tunisia) 2004	Third place	3rd	6	4	1	1	11	5	Squad	4	2	2	0	7	3
(Egypt) 2006	Third place	3rd	6	4	1	1	7	3	Squad	10	6	3	1	21	7
(Ghana) 2008	Quarter-finals	7th	4	1	1	2	3	3	Squad	6	5	0	1	10	3
(Angola) 2010	Third place	3rd	6	3	1	2	6	4	Squad	12	9	3	0	20	5
(Gabon) (Equatorial Guinea) 2012	Did not qualify									6	3	2	1	12	5
(South Africa) 2013	Champions	1st	6	4	2	0	11	4	Squad	4	2	2	0	10	3
(Equatorial Guinea) (Gabon) 2015	Did not qualify									6	2	2	2	9	7
(Gabon) 2017	Did not qualify									4	1	2	1	2	2
(Egypt) 2019	Third place	3rd	7	5	0	2	9	7	Squad	6	4	1	1	14	6
(Cameroon) 2021	Round of 16	9th	4	3	0	1	6	2	Squad	6	4	2	0	14	7
(Ivory Coast) 2023	Runners-up	2nd	7	4	2	1	8	4	Squad	6	5	0	1	22	4
(Morocco) 2025	Third place	3rd	7	6	0	1	14	4	Squad	6	3	2	1	9	3
(Kenya) (Tanzania) (Uganda) 2027	To be determined									To be determined					
Total	3 Titles	21/35	104	57	24	23	146	95	—	132	70	41	21	230	96

*Denotes draws including knockout matches decided via a penalty shoot-out.
**Red border colour indicates tournament was held on home soil.
