= Al-Hazem FC =

Association football club in Ar Rass, Saudi Arabia

- Full name: Al-Hazem Saudi Club
- Nicknames: Hazem Al-Samood (Determination and resilience)
- Founded: 1957; 69 years ago
- Ground: Al-Hazem Club Stadium; Ar Rass, Saudi Arabia
- Capacity: 8,000
- President: Talal Al-Ablan
- Head coach: Jalel Kadri
- League: Saudi Pro League
- 2025–26: Saudi Pro League, 9th of 18
- Website: alhazem.sa
Home colours	Away colours	Third colours

Al-Hazem Saudi Club (Arabic: نادي الحزم السعودي, romanized: nādī al-ḥazm as-suʿūdiyy, lit. 'Determination') is a Saudi Arabian professional football club based in Ar Rass, that competes in the Saudi Pro League, the top tier of the Saudi Arabian football system.

== History ==
Al-Hazem colors are red, yellow and blue. Al-Hazem have won the Saudi Third Division once in the 1997–98 season, and have finished runners-up once in the Saudi Second Division in the 1999–00 season. The club have won the Saudi First Division once in the 2004–05 season and won their first promotion to the Pro League. The club spent 6 consecutive seasons in the top flight before getting relegated.

The club play their home games at Al-Hazem Stadium in Ar Rass.

== Honours ==
Saudi First Division League

- Winners (2): 2004–05, 2020–21
- Runners-up (2): 2017–18, 2022–23
- Play-off winners: 2024–25

Saudi Second Division League

- Runners-up (1): 1999–2000

Saudi Third Division

- Winners (1): 1997–98

Al-Qassim Regional League

- Winners (9): 1967–68, 1969–70, 1970–71, 1971–72, 1980–81, 1984–85, 1990–91, 1994–95, 1997–98

== Coaching staff ==
Position	Name
Head coach	(Tunisia) Jalel Kadri
Assistant coach	(Tunisia) Kamel Zaiem (Tunisia) Ali Boumnijel (Saudi Arabia) Abdullah Asiri
Goalkeeper coach	(Saudi Arabia) Yasser Hawsawi
Fitness coach	(Tunisia) Bouazizi Mohamed Sabri (Saudi Arabia) Salman Al-Muharrabeh
Analyst	(Saudi Arabia) Abdullah Al-Ghanim
Doctor	(Saudi Arabia) Mohamed Al-Abbas
Physiotherapist	(Saudi Arabia) Waleed Al-Marzouq
Performance director	(Saudi Arabia) Saad Al-Khaibri

=== Managerial history ===
- (Algeria) Boualem Laroum (1997 – 2000)
- (Tunisia) Omar Meziane (2000)
- (Saudi Arabia) Khalid Al-Koroni (November 10, 2000 – March 27, 2001)
- (Egypt) Saad Soleit (caretaker) (March 27, 2001 – May 1, 2001)
- (Algeria) Boualem Laroum (June 25, 2001 – December 5, 2001)
- (Saudi Arabia) Ali Komaikh (December 6, 2001 – April 1, 2002)
- (Syria) Nizar Mahrous (August 1, 2002 – October 14, 2002)
- (Saudi Arabia) Saleh Al-Mutlaq (October 14, 2002 – October 25, 2002)
- (Brazil) José Fernandes (October 14, 2002 – January 22, 2003)
- (Tunisia) Fathi Al-Jabal (January 22, 2003 – April 1, 2003)
- (Brazil) Carlos (caretaker) (April 1, 2003 – May 1, 2003)
- (Egypt) Gamal Abdel-Hamid (July 9, 2003 – October 12, 2003)
- (Tunisia) Nasser Ben Alya (October 12, 2003 – December 16, 2003)
- (Romania) Leonida Nedelcu (December 16, 2003 – February 9, 2004)
- (Egypt) Hamada Sedki (February 9, 2004 – December 11, 2004)
- (Tunisia) Mondher Ladhari (December 11, 2004 – March 17, 2005)
- (Saudi Arabia) Khalid Al-Koroni (March 17, 2005 – May 20, 2005)
- (Tunisia) Ahmad Al-Ajlani (June 1, 2005 – February 18, 2006)
- (Tunisia) Mondher Ladhari (February 19, 2006 – April 30, 2006)
- (Tunisia) Ahmad Al-Ajlani (June 25, 2006 – December 2, 2006)
- (Brazil) Lula Pereira (December 2, 2006 – May 5, 2007)
- (Portugal) José Morais (June 4, 2007 – December 7, 2007)
- (Tunisia) Ammar Souayah (December 23, 2007 – May 30, 2009)
- (Egypt) Mohsen Saleh (July 27, 2009 – November 28, 2009)
- (Brazil) Lula Pereira (December 2, 2009 – May 1, 2010)
- (Tunisia) Lutfi Rhim (July 14, 2010 – October 29, 2010)
- (Tunisia) Fathi Al-Heric (October 29, 2010 – November 12, 2010)
- (Canada) Goran Miscevic (November 13, 2010 – May 31, 2011)
- (Croatia) Marinko Koljanin (June 23, 2011 – May 26, 2012)
- (Tunisia) Mondher Ladhari (July 8, 2012 – December 8, 2012)
- (Egypt) Abdullah Darwish (December 8, 2012 – September 23, 2013)
- (Saudi Arabia) Yousef Anbar (September 23, 2013 – March 25, 2014)
- (Tunisia) Saleem bin Mubarak (March 26, 2014 – April 20, 2014)
- (Saudi Arabia) Ali Komaikh (April 20, 2014 – October 10, 2014)
- (Saudi Arabia) Yousef Anbar (October 14, 2014 – March 4, 2015)
- (Tunisia) Saleem bin Mubarak (March 4, 2015 – June 1, 2015)
- (Tunisia) Lotfi Sellimi (June 22, 2015 – November 15, 2015)
- (Tunisia) Nasser Nefzi (November 17, 2015 – February 19, 2016)
- (Tunisia) Hatem Boulila (February 19, 2016 – May 1, 2016)
- (Saudi Arabia) Khalil Al-Masri (July 9, 2016 – May 18, 2017)
- (Tunisia) Habib Ben Romdhane (June 20, 2017 – April 5, 2018)
- (Saudi Arabia) Abdulwahab Al-Harbi (April 5, 2018 – May 5, 2018)
- (Romania) Daniel Isăilă (June 8, 2018 – January 31, 2020)
- (Brazil) André (January 31, 2020 – September 10, 2020)
- (Tunisia) Mohammed Dahmane (September 23, 2020 – June 1, 2021)
- (Portugal) Hélder (June 7, 2021 – November 27, 2021)
- (Romania) Constantin Gâlcă (December 6, 2021 – February 21, 2022)
- (Netherlands) Roel Coumans (March 1, 2022 – June 28, 2022)
- (Portugal) Filipe Gouveia (July 5, 2022 – October 20, 2023)
- (Uruguay) José Daniel Carreño (October 20, 2023 – April 19, 2024)
- (Saudi Arabia) Saleh Al-Mohammadi (April 19, 2024 – April 10, 2025)
- (Tunisia) Jalel Kadri (April 14, 2025 – )

== Players ==
As of September 7, 2026

Note: Flags indicate national team as defined under FIFA eligibility rules; some limited exceptions apply. Players may hold more than one non-FIFA nationality.

No.	Pos.	Nation	Player
1	GK	KSA	Yazan Al-Ruwaili
2	DF	KSA	Saud Al-Rashed
3	DF	TUN	Mohamed Amine Ben Hamida
4	DF	KSA	Sultan Tunkar
5	MF	KSA	Mohammed Issa
7	FW	NED	Elton Acolatse
8	MF	GUI	Mory Konaté
9	FW	COD	Afimico Pululu
10	MF	ALG	Amir Sayoud
11	FW	KSA	Waleed Al-Shangeati
12	DF	KSA	Farhan Al-Aazmi
13	DF	KSA	Abdullah Al-Shanqiti
17	MF	RWA	Bonheur Mugisha
20	FW	KSA	Nawaf Al-Bashri
21	MF	SEN	Amadou Dieng
22	MF	KSA	Abdulaziz Al-Dhuwayhi
23	GK	KSA	Ibrahim Zaid

No.	Pos.	Nation	Player
24	MF	GUI	Aboubacar Bah
27	DF	KSA	Ahmed Al-Nakhli
28	MF	ALG	Sofiane Bendebka
29	FW	MLI	Aboubacar Diakité
30	MF	KSA	Abdulrazzaq Awaji
33	GK	KSA	Majed Al-Ghamdi
34	DF	KSA	Abdulrahman Al-Dakheel
36	GK	CZE	Jindřich Staněk (on loan from Slavia Prague)
55	MF	KSA	Mohammed Al Darwish
61	DF	YEM	Thamer Muhaddili
70	MF	KSA	Ahmed Al-Shamrani
77	MF	KSA	Mohammed Al-Hamdani
82	DF	KSA	Abdulaziz Al-Harbi
88	MF	KSA	Khalid Abduljawad
90	MF	KSA	Hassan Idris
95	MF	KSA	Jaser Ateeq
98	MF	KSA	Ayman Al-Hujaili

=== Out on loan ===
Note: Flags indicate national team as defined under FIFA eligibility rules; some limited exceptions apply. Players may hold more than one non-FIFA nationality.

No.	Pos.	Nation	Player
99	FW	NGR	Faiz Hawsawi (at Al-Ansar)

== Former players ==
- Rashed Al-Mugren (Saudi Arabia international)

== See also ==
- List of football clubs in Saudi Arabia

== Sponsorship ==
Period	Kit manufacturer	Kit Sponsor
2017–2018	Pro Icon	Cabrito
2018–2019	Pro Icon	None
2019–2020	S Team	None
2020–2021	S Team	None
2021–2022	S Team	None
2022–2023	Gabyfox	Yelo
2023–2024	R.A Sport	International Human Resources
