= Imre Kiss =

Imre Kiss is the name of:

- Imre Kiss (New Zealand footballer) (fl. 1967)
- Imre Kiss (footballer born 1957), Hungarian footballer at the 1982 FIFA World Cup
