= Juma Pondamali =

Tanzanian footballer and coach

Personal information
- Place of birth: Tanzania
- Position: Goalkeeper

Senior career*
| Years | Team | Apps | (Gls) |
| 1970–1975 | Young Africans | | |
| 1976 | Kampuni Bia | | |
| 1977–1984 | Pan African | | |
| 1985–1989 | Young Africans | | |
| 1990–1992 | Pan African | | |
| 1993–1996 | AFC Leopards | | |

International career
| 1976–1980 | Tanzania | 7 | (0) |
- * Club domestic league appearances and goals

Juma Pondamali is a Tanzanian former footballer who played as a goalkeeper. He played for Young Africans, Pan African and Kenya's AFC Leopards, and represented the Tanzania national team.

Pondamali was a member of Tanzania's squad at the 1980 African Cup of Nations, where he made two appearances. He also played in qualifying matches for the 1982 FIFA World Cup.

After his playing career, Pondamali worked as a goalkeeping coach. He had this role for Tanzania at the 2013 CECAFA Cup, and went on to be head coach of Mashujaa in 2021.
