= Rashed Al-Mugren =

Saudi Arabian footballer (born 1977)

Personal information
- Date of birth: 7 November 1977 (age 49)
- Place of birth: Saudi Arabia
- Position: Goalkeeper

Senior career*
Years	Team	Apps	(Gls)
2004–2009	Al-Shabab		
2006–2008	Al Hazm (loan)		

International career
2004	Saudi Arabia	1	(0)
- * Club domestic league appearances and goals

Rashed Al-Mugren (born 1 November 1977) is a Saudi Arabian football player who last played as a goalkeeper for Al Hazm.

Al-Mugren appeared for the Saudi Arabia national football team in a qualifying match for the 2006 FIFA World Cup.
