= Zogby =

Zogby (زغبي) may refer to:

- IBOPE Zogby International, market research and polling company

== People with the surname ==
- James Zogby (born 1945), American founder and president of the Arab American Institute and brother of John Zogby
- John Zogby (born 1948), American pollster, president & CEO of Zogby International and brother of James Zogby

== See also ==
- Zoghbi / Zoghby, a surname
