= Mubarak Marzouq =

Kuwaiti footballer

Personal information
- Full name: Mubarak Marzouq Hamed Al-Issa
- Date of birth: 1 January 1961 (age 65)
- Place of birth: Kuwait
- Position: Defender

Senior career*
| Years | Team | Apps | (Gls) |
- Tadamon

International career
- Kuwait
- * Club domestic league appearances and goals

Mubarak Marzouq Hamed Al-Issa (Arabic: مُبَارَك مَرْزُوق حَامِد الْعِيسَى; born 1 January 1961) is a Kuwaiti football defender who played for Kuwait in the 1982 FIFA World Cup. He also played for Tadamon.
