= Mohamed Kajole =

Tanzanian footballer

Personal information
- Place of birth: Tanzania

International career
Years	Team	Apps	(Gls)
1980–1981	Tanzania	2	(0)

Mohamed Kajole was a Tanzania footballer who played for Tanzania in the 1980 African Cup of Nations.
