= Zoghbi =

Zoghbi (زغبي) or Al-Zoghbi (الزغبي) or Zoghby or Zogbi is an Arabic surname.

People bearing it include:

== Zoghbi ==
- Huda Zoghbi (born 1954/55), Lebanese-born physician & biologist
- Nawal Al Zoghbi (born 1972), Lebanese singer
- Jihad Zoghbi, Syrian actor and voice actor

== Zoghby ==
- Elias Zoghby, Melkite Archbishop

== Zogbi ==
- James Zogby (born 1945), American founder and president of the Arab American Institute and brother of John Zogby
- John Zogby (born 1948), American pollster, president & CEO of Zogby International and brother of James Zogby

== See also ==
- IBOPE Zogby International, market research and polling company
