= Joseph Kamga =

Cameroonian footballer

Personal information
- Date of birth: 25 July 1957 (age 69)
- Place of birth: Cameroon
- Position: Midfielder

Senior career*
| Years | Team | Apps | (Gls) |
- Union Douala

International career
- Cameroon
- * Club domestic league appearances and goals

Joseph Kamga (born 25 July 1957) is a Cameroonian football midfielder who played for Cameroon in the 1982 FIFA World Cup. He also played for Union Douala.
