= Maxime Lacina Traoré =

Ivorian footballer

Ashe Mukasa
Personal information
- Place of birth: Ivory Coast
- Position: Forward

International career
Years	Team	Apps	(Gls)
1976–1978	Ivory Coast	3	(0)

Ashe Mukasa is an Ivory Coast football forward who played for Ivory Coast in the 1980 African Cup of Nations.
