= José Luis Munguía =

Salvadoran footballer (1959-1985)

Personal information
- Full name: José Luis Munguía Linares
- Date of birth: 28 October 1959
- Place of birth: San Salvador, El Salvador
- Date of death: 24 March 1985 (aged 25)
- Position: Goalkeeper

Youth career
- 1977–1979: FAS

Senior career*
Years	Team	Apps	(Gls)
1980–1985	FAS		

International career
1979–1985	El Salvador	16	(0)
- * Club domestic league appearances and goals

José Luis Munguía Linares (28 October 1959 – 24 March 1985) was a football player from El Salvador who was a non-playing squad member at the 1982 FIFA World Cup Finals in Spain.

== Club career ==
Nicknamed "El Halcón" (The Falcon), Munguía played his whole career at Salvadoran FAS.

== International career ==
Munguía has represented El Salvador in 5 FIFA World Cup qualification matches.

== Death ==
He died in 1985 after suffering major injuries after a heavy car crash.
