= Simon Tchobang =

Cameroonian footballer

Personal information
- Full name: Simon Tchobang Tchoya
- Date of birth: 31 August 1951
- Place of birth: Douala, Cameroon
- Date of death: 7 September 2007 (aged 56)
- Place of death: Douala, Cameroon
- Position: Goalkeeper

Senior career*
Years	Team	Apps	(Gls)
- Eclair Douala
- Avion Entrelec Douala
- Dynamo Douala
- Dihep di Nkam Yabassi

International career
- Cameroon
- * Club domestic league appearances and goals

Simon Tchobang Tchoya (31 August 1951 – 7 September 2007) was a Cameroonian football goalkeeper who played for Cameroon in the 1982 FIFA World Cup. He also played for Eclair Douala, Avion Entrelec Douala, Dynamo Douala and Dihep di Nkam Yabassi.

== Career ==
Born in Douala, Tchobang began playing football as a goalkeeper for Eclair Douala in the 1970s.
