= Imre Kiss (footballer, born 1957) =

Hungarian footballer

Personal information
- Date of birth: 10 August 1957 (age 69)
- Place of birth: Hungary
- Position: Goalkeeper

Senior career*
Years	Team	Apps	(Gls)
1975–1990	Tatabanya Banyasz		
- * Club domestic league appearances and goals

Imre Kiss (born 10 August 1957) is a Hungarian former footballer who played as a goalkeeper.

== Career ==
Kiss played club football for Tatabanya Banyasz.

Kiss was a squad member of the Hungary national team at the 1982 FIFA World Cup. However, he was never capped for his country.
