= Philibert Dié Foneye =

Ivorian footballer

Personal information
- Place of birth: Ivory Coast
- Position: Defender

International career
Years	Team	Apps	(Gls)
1976–1978	Ivory Coast	2	(0)

Philibert Dié Foneye is an Ivorian football defender who played for Ivory Coast in the 1980 African Cup of Nations.
