= Saad Soleit =

Egyptian footballer

Personal information
- Place of birth: Egypt
- Position: Midfielder

Senior career*
Years	Team	Apps	(Gls)
- El Mansoura SC

International career
1977-1980	Egypt		
- * Club domestic league appearances and goals

Saad Soleit is an Egyptian football midfielder who played for Egypt in the 1980 African Cup of Nations.
