= Moses Effiong =

Nigerian footballer (1959–2025)

Personal information
- Date of birth: 4 October 1959
- Place of birth: Federation of Nigeria
- Date of death: 26 January 2025 (aged 65)
- Place of death: United States
- Height: 1.65 m (5 ft 5 in)
- Position: Goalkeeper

Senior career*
Years	Team	Apps	(Gls)
- Sharks F.C.
- New Nigeria Bank of Benin
- Shooting Stars F.C.

International career
1980	Nigeria U23		
	Nigeria	1	
Medal record
African Cup of Nations
Gold medal – first place	1980 African Cup of Nations
- * Club domestic league appearances and goals

Moses Effiong (4 October 1959 – 26 January 2025) was a Nigerian footballer who played for the Nigeria national team as a goalkeeper. He won the 1980 African Cup of Nations tournament while representing Nigeria.

Effiong died after a long illness in the United States, on 26 January 2025, at the age of 65.

== Honours ==
Nigeria

- African Cup of Nations: 1980
- West African Club Championship: 1983, 1984
