= Pan African S.C. =

Association football club in Tanzania

Pan African Football Club
- Full name: Pan African Football Club
- Nickname(s): Pan FC
- Founded: 1975
- Ground: National Stadium; Dar es Salaam, Tanzania
- Capacity: 65,000
- Chairman: Adam Kirumbi
- Manager: Daniel Magogo
- League: Tanzanian First League
- 2024–25: 1
| Home colours | Away colours |

Pan African Football Club is a Tanzanian football club based in Dar es Salaam.

They play in the top level of Tanzanian professional football, the Tanzanian Premier League.

== History ==
FC Pan African was founded in 1970 in Dar es Salaam, Tanzania. Based in the capital, Dar es Salaam, the team has won the Tanzanian Football League twice and the Tanzanian Cup three times. They have participated in four CAF tournaments, successfully advancing past the first round each time. They are sponsored by Meridian.

The 2007–08 season was the last in the Tanzanian Football League to date, where they finished in last place.

Despite their past successes, the club has faced difficulties in recent years, with their league performance becoming more inconsistent. However, the team continues to play a role in developing young players and remains a respected name in Tanzanian football.

=== Achievements ===
The greatest achievements of FC Pan African are linked to their dominance in Tanzanian football during the 1970s and 1980s. The club has won the Tanzanian Premier League several times, although their recent successes have been limited. The club has also participated in continental competitions, representing Tanzania in tournaments like the CAF Champions League and the CAF Confederation Cup in the past.

== Achievements ==
- Tanzanian Premier League: 1

1982

- Muungano Cup: 1

1982

- Nyerere Cup: 3

1978, 1979, 1981

== Performance in CAF competitions ==
- African Cup of Champions Clubs: 2 appearances

1983: Second Round
1989: Preliminary Round

- CAF Cup Winners' Cup: 3 appearances

1979 – Second Round
1980 – Second Round
1982 – Second Round
