= John Orlando =

Ghanaian-born Nigerian footballer

Personal information
- Full name: John Orlando
- Date of birth: 15 October 1960 (age 66)
- Place of birth: Ghana
- Height: 1.86 m (6 ft 1 in)
- Position: Defender

Senior career*
Years	Team	Apps	(Gls)
- Water Corporation of Ilorin
- Shooting Stars F.C.

International career
1980	Nigeria U-23	3	
1980–1982	Nigeria		
Medal record
African Cup of Nations
Gold medal – first place	1980 African Cup of Nations
- * Club domestic league appearances and goals

John Orlando (born 15 October 1960) is a Nigerian former footballer who played for the Nigeria national football team as a defender. He won the 1980 African Cup of Nations tournament while representing Nigeria and also represented Nigeria at the 1980 Summer Olympics in Russia.

== Honours ==
=== International ===
- Africa Cup of Nations – 1980
