= Laurent Zahui =

Ivorian footballer (1960–2021)

Personal information
- Full name: Laurent Madou Zahui
- Date of birth: 10 August 1960
- Place of birth: Gagnoa, Ivory Coast
- Date of death: 16 March 2021 (aged 60)
- Place of death: Toulouse, France
- Height: 1.68 m (5 ft 6 in)
- Position: Defender

Senior career*
| Years | Team | Apps | (Gls) |
| 1976–1985 | Stade d'Abidjan | | |
| 1985–1986 | Angoulême | | |
| 1986–1989 | Rodez | | |

International career
| 1980–1988 | Ivory Coast | | |
- * Club domestic league appearances and goals

Laurent Madou Zahui (10 August 1960 – 16 March 2021) was an Ivorian professional footballer who played as a defender for Stade d'Abidjan, AS Angoulême, Rodez, and the Ivory Coast national team.

== Club career ==
Born in Gagnoa, Zahui began playing football in the local league for Stade d'Abidjan.

Zahui signed professional contracts with French league sides AS Angoulême and Rodez AF.

== International career ==
Zahui made several appearances for the Ivory Coast national team and played at the 1988 finals.

He also played for Ivory Coast at the 1977 FIFA World Youth Championship finals in Tunisia.

== Death ==
Zahui died on 16 March 2021 in Toulouse, while undergoing hip surgery.
