= Mehdi Cerbah =

Algerian footballer (1953–2021)

Personal information
- Full name: Mehdi Cerbah
- Date of birth: 3 April 1953
- Place of birth: Algiers, French Algeria
- Date of death: 29 October 2021 (aged 68)
- Height: 1.74 m (5 ft 9 in)
- Position: Goalkeeper

Youth career
- 1964–19??: RAM Alger
- USM Alger

Senior career*
Years	Team	Apps	(Gls)
1970–1972	USM Alger	–	(0)
1972–1980	JS Kabylie / JS Kawkabi / JE Tizi Ouzou	–	(0)
1980–1982	RS Kouba	–	(0)
1983	Montreal Manic	5	(0)
1983–1986	RS Kouba	–	(0)

International career
1975–1986	Algeria	57	(0)
- * Club domestic league appearances and goals

Mehdi Cerbah (3 April 1953 – 29 October 2021) was an Algerian footballer who played as a goalkeeper for the Algeria national team.

== Career ==
Cerbah spent most of his career playing for Algerian sides USM Alger, JS Kabylie and RC Kouba. He played one season of indoor football in Canada, after signing in January 1983 with NASL side Montreal Manic. He returned to Algeria and finished his career in RC Kouba until 1986.

Cerbah won 57 caps for the Algeria national team, including three appearances at the 1982 FIFA World Cup finals, which included a famous victory over West Germany. He also played in several African Cup of Nations finals, including the 1980 finals where Algeria finished runners-up, losing to Nigeria in the final 3–0.

== Honours ==
=== Club ===
- Algerian League Champion in 1973, 1974, 1977, 1980 with JS Kabylie and in 1981 with RC Kouba
  - 2nd in the Algerian League in 1978, 1979 with JS Kabylie
- Algerian Cup winner in 1977 with JS Kabylie
  - 2nd in Algerian Cup in 1979 with JS Kabylie
- Algerian Super Cup winner in 1973 with JS Kabylie
- 2nd in Maghreb Champions Cup with JS Kabylie
- 2nd in 1983 NASL Grand Prix of Indoor Soccer with Montreal Manic

=== Country ===
- Gold medal in the 1975 Mediterranean Games in Algiers
- Gold medal in the 1978 All-Africa Games in Algiers
- Bronze medal in the 1979 Mediterranean Games in Split
- 2nd in the final of the 1980 African Cup of Nations in Nigeria
- Participation in FIFA World Cup of 1982 in Spain

=== Individual ===
- Best Algerian goalkeeper of the 20th Century
- Indoor Tournament Defensive MVP of 1983 NASL Grand Prix of Indoor Soccer with Montreal Manic
- Indoor Leading Goalkeeper 1983 (GAA: 4.36, GA: 24) with Montreal Manic
