= Aloysius Atuegbu =

Nigerian footballer (1953–2008)

Aloysious Atuegbu
Personal information
- Full name: Aloysious Ikem Atuegbu
- Date of birth: 29 April 1953
- Place of birth: Jos, Nigeria
- Date of death: 25 May 2008 (aged 55)
- Height: 1.65 m (5 ft 5 in)
- Position: Forward

Senior career*
| Years | Team | Apps | (Gls) |
| –1976 | Mighty Jets | | |
| 1976– | Enugu Rangers | | |
| – | Ranchers Bees | | |

International career^{‡}
| 1974–1981 | Nigeria | 53 | (7) |
- * Club domestic league appearances and goals ‡ National team caps and goals as of May, 2008

Aloysious Ikem Atuegbu (29 April 1953 – 25 May 2008) was a Nigerian football player. Nicknamed "Blockbuster" for his ferocious shots, he was a stalwart on the Super Eagles offense from 1975 until 1981, winning 60 caps.

After retirement he got into coaching, including a stint with the Nigeria under-17 national football team. At his death he was coaching Keffi United FC.
