= Emmanuel Okala =

Nigerian footballer (born 1951)

Personal information
- Full name: Emmanuel Oguajiofor Okala
- Date of birth: 17 May 1951 (age 75)
- Place of birth: Onitsha, Anambra State, Nigeria
- Height: 1.98 m (6 ft 6 in)
- Position: Goalkeeper

Youth career
- 1966–1970: Onitsha Red Devils

Senior career*
Years	Team	Apps	(Gls)
1971–1980	Enugu Rangers		

International career
1972–1980	Nigeria	59	(0)
Medal record
African Cup of Nations
Gold medal – first place	1980 African Cup of Nations
- * Club domestic league appearances and goals

Emmanuel Anthony Oguejiofo Okala // (born May 17, 1951) is a former footballer who played for the Nigerian national football team from 1972 to 1980. He was named "Footballer of the Year" in 1978, and was part of the Nigeria team that won the 1980 African Cup of Nations tournament.

== Career ==
In the late 1970s and 80s Emmanuel was Africa's Best known goal keeper of his time. He kept for the Rangers International of Enugu and the Green Eagles as the National Team was then. He spent his Youth playing for Clubs and country. In 1977, he created a record which may yet be equalled, being voted the African Footballer of the Year, the first time for a goal keeper. He was in goal for Enugu Rangers against AS Police of Senegal in the first leg quarter finals of the African Winners Cup. His superlative saves in the encounter greatly contributed to Rangers' victory and won him great recognition, which guaranteed his triumph in the vote later that year.

He captained the Green Eagles to ECOWAS games Soccer Gold over Ghana. He was hired as Super Eagles keeper's trainer. He hardly settled before the NFA fired him for not possessing certificates.

Emmanuel Okala, Christian Chukwu, Segun Odegbami, Henry Nwosu among others who played the round leather game attended the Airpeace Investiture Award for the 1976 Montreal Olympics. The Chairman of Airpeace, Chief Allen Onyema hosted the event to honour the Nigerian Football legends who boycotted the 1976 Montreal Olympics held in Canada in demonstration against the apartheid regime in South Africa. He played for the Green Eagles from 1972 to 1980

In a 2025 interview, Okala recounted his early life, entry into football, and rise to professional status. He emphasized his loyalty to the Nigeria national football team and to Rangers International F.C., and explained his reasons for not moving to Europe. He reflected on the evolution of Nigerian football and the challenges it continues to face. Okala noted that he retired from the national team in 1980 and from Rangers in 1981 after winning the Challenge Cup, remaining in football at the request of the Eastern Central State governor to secure the trophy, which he achieved with his team. He described his first experience as a goalkeeper as a seemingly chance occurrence that altered the course of his life, leading to an illustrious career in which he became known as “Man Mountain” or “Iroko,” a reference to his height of 6 ft 6 in (1.98 m), with "iroko" being the Yoruba name for the tallest tree. He also recalled the initial lack of family support for football as a profession at the time, which shifted to encouragement and pride with his growing success, and highlighted the friendships and personal relationships he maintained with teammates and fans throughout his career.

== Personal life ==
His younger brother Patrick was also a Nigerian International Goal Keeper. When he died in 1991 Emmanuel expected the Government to support his family. He was forced to retire from the National Team after NFA officials refused Coach Otto Gloria to field him in AFCON grand finale against Algeria. After Rangers lifted the winners cup in 1977, Okala became hot cake in Cameroon and was offered Nationality

== Honours / Awards ==
=== Individual ===
- Voted Footballer of The Year Award by African Sports Journalists Union – 1978
- He won all African Games Gold - 1973

=== International ===
- 1980 African Cup of Nations – 1980
