= Tunde Bamidele =

Nigerian footballer (1953–1997)

Personal information
- Date of birth: 13 May 1953
- Place of birth: Nigeria
- Date of death: 1997
- Position: Defender

Senior career*
Years	Team	Apps	(Gls)
–	Taraba United of Yola	-	(-)

International career
1978–1982	Nigeria	35	(0)
- * Club domestic league appearances and goals

Tunde Bamidele, also known by his nickname Rock of Gibraltar (13 May 1953 – 1997) was a Nigerian former footballer who played as a defender for Nigeria in the 1978 African Cup of Nations and in 1980 Summer Olympics. He also played for Raccah Rovers of Kano.

== Career ==
Bamidele played club football for Taraba FC.

He played for the Nigeria national football team at the 1980 and 1982 African Cup of Nations finals.
