= Shefiu Mohamed =

Nigerian footballer

Personal information
- Date of birth: 20 May 1956 (age 70)

International career
Years	Team	Apps	(Gls)
- Nigeria

Shefiu Mohamed (born 20 May 1956) is a Nigerian footballer. He competed in the men's tournament at the 1980 Summer Olympics.
