= Rangers International F.C. =

Association football club in Nigeria

Coordinates: 6.44427°N 7.49630°E

Rangers International FC
- Full name: Rangers International Football Club
- Nickname: Flying Antelopes
- Founded: 1970; 56 years ago
- Ground: Nnamdi Azikiwe Stadium, Enugu, Enugu State, Nigeria
- Capacity: 22,000
- Chairman: Amobi Ezeaku
- Coach: Fidelis Ilechukwu
- League: Nigeria Professional Football League
- 2025–26: NPFL: 1st of 20, Champions
- Website: https://rangersintl.com/
Home colours	Away colours

Rangers International Football Club, commonly known as Enugu Rangers, is a Nigerian professional association football club founded in 1970. Based in Enugu, the team plays its home games at the Nnamdi Azikiwe Stadium.

Rangers are one of the oldest clubs in Nigeria and are the only club never to have been relegated from the Nigeria Premier League. Established after the Nigerian Civil War, they quickly became successful, winning multiple league and FA Cup titles in the 1970s and 1980s.

Internationally, Rangers reached the finals of the African Cup of Champions Clubs in 1975 and won the African Cup Winners' Cup in 1977. The club secured league titles in 2016 and 2024 and is nicknamed the Flying Antelopes. It has a reported fan base of approximately 10 million supporters.

== History ==
=== The 1970s ===
Enugu Rangers won a nationally organized tournament in 1970 which allowed them to qualify for the 1971 African Cup of Champions Clubs. Rangers lost in the quarterfinal 0–3 on aggregate to ASEC Mimosas.

In the same year, they almost achieved domestic success in the Nigerian FA Cup as well, but lost the final 2–1 to Shooting Stars F.C.

After winning the 1974 double, including a 2–0 cup final win over Mighty Jets, the Enugu players were given cars and promotions at the Nigerian Sports Council.

Rangers lost the 1975 African Cup of Champions Clubs to Guinea's Hafia FC, earning left-back Silvanus Okpala the nickname "Hafia" for his poor play in the final. Enugu had overturned a 3–1 defeat in Egypt in the semifinal to qualify for the final. Founding Ranger Ernest Ufele retired after the defeat.

In 1977, the club, now managed by their first-ever captain, Godwin Achebe, faced ASF Police of Dakar in the quarterfinals. Held to a goalless draw at home, Rangers took the lead twenty minutes into the second half of the away leg, silencing the Senegal stadium, and eventually winning the match 2–1. After the game ended, team members were physically assaulted by Senegalese fans, according to Nigerian press reports, and three were stabbed. A military plane was flown to Dakar to evacuate the victors.

The 1977 semi-finals set up one of the greatest ties in Nigerian football history as Rangers were drawn against Shooting Stars. Rangers would go on to defeat Canon Yaounde 5–2 on aggregate in the final, including a 4–1 win on Nigerian soil.

During this time period, Rangers boasted a number of Nigerian national team players such as Christian Chukwu, goalkeeper Emmanuel Okala Aloysius Atuegbu and Luke Jaz Bucana Okpala.

=== The 1980s ===
Led by coach Christian Chukwu, Enugu Rangers won the 1983 Nigerian Cup, defeating DIC Bees of Kaduna 5–4 on penalties after a 0–0 draw.

Rangers won their sixth title in 1984 with a number of players who had led Nigeria to the 1980 African Cup of Nations. Louis Igwilo captained the team. The Rangers team of the 1980s included Charles Okonkwo, Ikechukwu Ofoje, Benjamin Okaro, Ifeanyi Onyedika, Benedict Ugwu, Kingsley Onye, Kenneth Boardman, Sylvanus Okpala, Ibezim Ofoedu, Gabriel Okonkwo, Emeka Akabueze,

=== The 1990s: lean years ===
Rangers joined the new fully professional league in 1990 and made cup final that year, losing to Stationery Stores on 5–4 on penalty kicks. They would not make another cup final appearance in the decade, and sadly their best league finish was third place in 1998.

=== The 2000s ===
Rangers topped the table after the 2001 home and away season but finished bottom of the four-team championship playoff group.

Enugu Rangers made the group stage of the 2004 CAF Confederation Cup and missed out on winning the group and making the final after losing a head-to-head tiebreaker to Asante Kotoko. Rangers drew 0–0 against Angola's Petro de Luanda and celebrated, thinking they had advanced on goal difference, but the first tiebreaker was head-to-head.

In the 2005 season, Rangers finished as Runners-up in the league, five points off eventual champions Enyimba.

In 2008–09, they played some games in nearby Abakaliki and Nnewi as their stadium was renovated for the 2009 FIFA U-17 World Cup. Before the season started, Enugu State governor Sullivan Chime paid the backlog of sign-on fees dating to three years ago and all other debts owed the players.

In November 2008, Rangers became the first Nigerian club side to be a public company and sell ownership stock. However the deal fell through, and the club began the 2009 season in debt. The club is currently owned by the state government.

Enugu did begin a 12-year run of success in a minor trophy, the local state FA Cup, which they won every year from 2005 to 2017.

=== 2016–current: Success again ===
After a 2015 season which nearly saw them relegated, Enugu won the 2016 Nigeria Premier League, their first championship since 1982. Their closest challengers Rivers United needed Enugu to lose on the final day of the season, but Rangers won their game against El-Kanemi Warriors 4–0 to win the championship.

2017 saw Enugu struggle, dropping into the relegation zone halfway through the season. They recovered, finishing 14th and keeping alive their record of never being relegated from the top flight.

The club went on to win their first Nigerian Cup in 35 years in 2018. Rangers stunned Kano Pillars, coming back from a 3–0 deficit to win the trophy on penalties. Ajani Ibrahim scored on a diving header two minutes into stoppage time to tie the game 3–3. Rangers played in the final five times from 1987 to 2007, never winning once.

In the first championship playoff clash on Wednesday, June 13, 2019, Enugu Rangers defeated FC IfeanyiUbah 4–2 in a six-goal thriller to secure a CAF Confederation Cup ticket.

Many Nigerians remember with fondness watching Enugu Rangers play in the 1970s and 1980s.

On matchday 35 of the 2023-24 edition of the NPFL, 44,000 people showed up for a game between Rangers International and rivals Enyimba FC at the Nnamdi Azikiwe Stadium, the best-attended match in the NPFL during that football season. On 16th June 2024 under coach Fidelis Ilechukwu, Rangers won the 2023/2024 NPFL championship title after defeating Bendel Insurance by 2-0 with a game to play, this extended their league title wins to 8. Their success has been extended to other national trophies and championship. They have won 5 times between the year 1974 - 1983^{.}

On May 24, 2026, Rangers won the 2025/2026 league season by defeating Ikorodu city who were playing at home and seeking a continental ticket. Chidiebere Nwobodo with a brace helped the Coach Fidelis Ilechukwu side triumph over Ikorodu city with a 1-2 scoreline

League season	Average home attendance
2017 NPFL	14,651
2023-24 NPFL	20,672
2024-25 NPFL	11,684

== Crest ==
Former logo

== Rivalries ==
Enyimba and Rangers compete in the "Oriental derby." It will be the first time Enugu Rangers Coach Ogunbote Gbenga who was in charge of Eyinmba last season will be facing his former Club this season.

== Honours ==
=== Domestic ===
- Nigeria Premier League
  - Winners (9): 1974, 1975, 1977, 1981, 1982, 1984, 2016, 2024, 2026
- Nigerian FA Cup
  - Winners (6): 1974, 1975, 1976, 1981, 1983, 2018
- Nigerian Super Cup
  - Winners (1): 2004

=== Continental ===
- African Cup of Champions Clubs
  - Runners-up: 1975
- African Cup Winners' Cup
  - Winners (1): 1977

== Performance in CAF competitions ==
- African Cup of Champions Clubs / CAF Champions League : 10 appearances

The club had 7 appearances in African Cup of Champions Clubs from 1971 to 1985 and 3 appearances in CAF Champions League from 2006 to 2017.

1971 – Quarter-finals
1975 – Finalist
1976 – Semi-finals
1978 – Semi-finals

1982 – Semi-finals
1983 – First Round
1985 – Second Round

2006 – First Round
2013 – Second Round
2017 – First Round

- CAF Confederation Cup: 4 appearances

2004 – Group stage
2005 – Intermediate Round
2013 – Intermediate Round
2017 – Playoff Round
2018–19 – Group stage
2019–20 – Group stage

- CAF Cup: 2 appearances

1996 – Second Round
2003 – Semi-finals

- CAF Cup Winners' Cup: 2 appearances

1977 – Champion
1984 – Quarter-finals

== Current first team squad ==
As of 26 November 2021 Note: Flags indicate national team as defined under FIFA eligibility rules; some limited exceptions apply. Players may hold more than one non-FIFA nationality.

No.	Pos.	Nation	Player
2	GK	NGR	Japhet Opubo
3	DF	NGR	Ifeanyi Okoro
4	GK	NGR	Kingdom Osayi
5	DF	SEN	Pape Sané
7	MF	NGR	Ifeanyi Nweke
8	MF	NGR	Kazeem Ogunleye
9	MF	NGR	Isaac Savior
10	MF	NGR	Okoire
12	DF	NGR	Osas Okoro
13	LB	NGR	Igboke Kenneth
14	FW	NGR	Ifeanyi Ogba
16	GK	NGR	Olufemi Thomas
18	FW	NGR	Godwin Obaje
19	MF	NGR	Kenneth Agu

No.	Pos.	Nation	Player
20	DF	NGR	Temitope Olusesi
22	MF	NGR	Shedrack Asiegbu
24	DF	NGR	Ernest Governor
25	GK	GHA	Nana Bonsu
27	FW	NGR	Odah
28	MF	NGR	Archibong Eso
29	FW	NGR	Kenechukwu Agu
31	MF	NGR	Chidiebere Nwobodo
33	MF	NGR	Ebuka Franklin Anthony
34	FW	NGR	Timothy Simon
35	MF	NGR	Charles Tiesso
36	MF	NGR	Daniel Vandagar
—	DF	NGR	Chibueze Oputa (Rangers International)

== Officials ==
Position	Name
Chairman	(Nigeria) Festus Onu
Business & Marketing Director	(Nigeria) Ben Okolie
Technical Director	(Nigeria) Nobert Okolie
General Manager	(Nigeria) Amobi Eze
Team Manager	(Nigeria) Amobi Ezeaku
Head Coach	(Nigeria) Ilechukwu Fidelis
Chief Coach	(Nigeria) Mbwas Mangut
Physiotherapist	(Nigeria) Adejuyigbe Opeyemi
Assistant Coach I	(Nigeria) John Edeh
Fitness Coach	(Nigeria) Edeh Mohamed
Goalkeeper Trainer I	(Nigeria) Zeph Oraka

== Former head coaches ==
- (Nigeria) Daniel Anyiam (1970–1972)
- (Nigeria) Godwin Achebe (1972–1978)
- (Brazil) Roberto Diaz (1980–1982)
- (Brazil) Denilson Custodio 1982
- (Poland) Janusz Kowalik (1983–1984)
- (Serbia) Kosta Papić (2002–2003)
- (Nigeria) Okey Emordi (2008)
- (Nigeria) Christian Chukwu (2008 – Aug 2009)
- (Nigeria) Alphonsus Dike (Sept 2009–2011)
- (Nigeria) Okey Emordi (Feb 2012 – Oct 2013)
- (Nigeria) Imama Amapakabo (2015–2017).
- (Nigeria) Abdul Maikaba (2018-2021)
- (Nigeria) Gbenga Ogunbote (2021-2022)
- (Nigeria) Fidelis Ilechukwu (2023-Till date)

== Notable players ==
- (Nigeria) Christian Chukwu
- (Nigeria) Augustine Azuka "Jay-Jay" Okocha
- (Nigeria) Emmanuel Okala
- (Nigeria) Adokiye Amiesimaka
- (Nigeria) John Utaka
- (Nigeria) Onyekachi Apam
- (Nigeria) Luke Okpala
