= David Adiele =

Nigerian footballer

Personal information
- Date of birth: 5 February 1955 (age 71)
- Place of birth: Cameroon
- Position: Defender

International career
Years	Team	Apps	(Gls)
1980	Nigeria	15	(0)

David Adiele is a Nigerian former footballer who played as a defender for the Nigeria national team at both the 1980 Summer Olympics and the 1980 African Cup of Nations.
