= Christian Chukwu =

Nigerian footballer (1951–2025)

Personal information
- Full name: Christian Chukwu Okoro
- Date of birth: 4 January 1951
- Date of death: 12 April 2025 (aged 74)
- Position: Defender

Senior career*
Years	Team	Apps	(Gls)
1972–1981	Enugu Rangers		

International career
1974–1981	Nigeria	54	(5)

Managerial career
- 1982–1985: Enugu Rangers
- 1985–1986: Nigeria U17
- 1986–1988: Enugu Rangers
- 1998–2003: Kenya
- 2003–2005: Nigeria
- 2005–2009: Enugu Rangers
- * Club domestic league appearances and goals

Christian Chukwu Okoro (4 January 1951 – 12 April 2025) was a Nigerian football player and coach. A defender in his playing days, he captained the Nigeria national team to its first win in the Africa Cup of Nations.

== Early life ==
Chukwu was born on 4 January 1951. He was discouraged by his parents while playing football at a young age. He was also given plantains to hawk just to stop him from playing football. It was when he started playing for National Grammar School, Nike and the Highlanders FC owned by the Ministry of Finance that his parents started taking him seriously. He became captain of his school and led them to so many victories. His favourite arena was the Ngwo Park. The park has the reputation of producing most of the great players who have played for Rangers, Vasco and the Green Eagles.

== Education ==
Chukwu attended Christ Church Primary School, Uwani, Enugu. He attended National Secondary School, Nike, Enugu. He joined East Central State Academicals and won the National Cup.

== Playing career ==
As a player, Chukwu captained the Nigerian national team, then known as the Green Eagles, between 1974 and 1980. He was in the Nigerian squads that won the Africa Nations' Cup in 1980 and finished runners-up in 1976 and 1978. He was the first Nigerian captain to lift the African Nations Cup trophy after a 3–0 victory over Algeria in the final of the 1980 tournament.

In October 1998 he was appointed coach of the Kenya national team. Later, from 2003 to 2005, he coached Nigeria, leading them to reach the semifinals at the 2004 African Cup of Nations. During the 2006 World Cup qualification phase, Chukwu was blamed for inept coaching and management of the Nigerian national football team, and two matches before the qualifying campaign was over, he was suspended. In two matches – home and away – against eventual group winners Angola, Nigeria failed to win either one of those two encounters. This was blamed on Chukwu and those two crucial failures eventually led to Nigeria failing to qualify for the World Cup, after having appeared at all World Cup finals tournaments since their debut in 1994.

Chukwu coached the Enugu Rangers to sixth place in the 2008–2009 edition of the Nigeria Premier League. However, he was sacked on 5 August 2009 for failing to reach the club's targets for the season. Chukwu was made the Rangers' General Manager and Chief Executive Officer (CEO). The announcement was made by Governor Ifeanyi Ugwuanyi.

== Personal life and death ==
Chukwu had a close bond and friendship with the teammates and other leaders like himself that made them win and even in old age he still bonded very well with them. Dan Anyiam made a lot of impact in his life as a football player. He spent his childhood between Robinson and Kenyatta streets. He is married and has four children, two boys and two girls.

In April 2019, the Nigeria Football Federation announced that they would help Chukwu pay for his medical bills for treatment in the United States, while billionaire Femi Otedola said he would also contribute. It was later announced that he would travel for treatment in May after the required funds were raised; he was cured.

Chukwu died on 12 April 2025, at the age of 74.

== Controversies ==
Chukwu was called a destitute old man abandoned to his fate; however, Hon Ogbuagu Anikwe highlighted the facts about his illness, stating that he had a public service job that enabled him to meet his health needs. The Enugu State Government notes that the negative stories surrounding Chukwu's condition started from the desperation of his friend in the US, who claimed that Chukwu had been abandoned.

== Honours ==
Nigeria

- Africa Cup of Nations: 1980
