= Adokiye Amiesimaka =

Nigerian footballer (born 1956)

Personal information
- Date of birth: 23 November 1956 (age 69)
- Position: Left midfielder

International career
Years	Team	Apps	(Gls)
1977-1981	Nigeria	39	(5)

Adokiye Amiesimaka (born 23 November 1956) is a Nigerian footballer, who as a law student at the University of Lagos played for the Enugu Rangers Football Club (of Enugu), Sharks Football Club (of Port Harcourt), African Continental Bank Football Club, Lagos, and the Nigeria national football team. Playing as a winger on the left of midfield, Adokiye’s pace and dribbling runs were a distinguishing feature of his footballing career.

Adokiye was a member of the Nigerian side that won gold at the African Cup of Nations in 1980 and played at the soccer finals of the 1980 Summer Olympics. He also represented Nigeria at the 1978 and 1982 FIFA World Cup Qualifiers.

Adokiye attended CMS Grammar School, Lagos, where as captain of the school’s soccer team he won Lagos State’s Principals’ Cup in a much-talked about final that featured St. Finbarr’s College (Lagos). He went on to read law at the University of Lagos,

A former chairman of Sharks Football Club (of Port Harcourt), Adokiye has the stadium in Ikwerre Local Government Area of Rivers State named after him. He is also a former Attorney-General and Commissioner of Justice in Rivers State, having served previously as Director of Public Prosecution in the state.

== The 2009 Age-grade Controversy ==
In 2009, Adokiye, a columnist with The Punch newspaper (a Nigerian daily) was embroiled in controversy following his claim in his weekly column that some members of the Nigerian Under-17 football team were a lot older than their "official ages". The football authorities in Nigeria did not, however, follow up on this claim.
