= Abdelkader Horr =

Algerian footballer (born 1953)

Personal information
- Date of birth: 10 November 1953 (age 72)
- Place of birth: Algiers, Algeria
- Position: Defender

Senior career*
Years	Team	Apps	(Gls)
- DNC Alger

International career
1978–1982	Algeria	37	(2)
- * Club domestic league appearances and goals

Abdelkader Horr (born 10 November 1953) is an Algerian former footballer who played as a defender for Algeria from 1978 to 1982, including at the 1982 FIFA World Cup. He also played for DNC Alger.
