= 1984 African Cup of Nations squads =

Below is a list of squads used in the 1984 African Nations Cup.

== Group A ==
=== Cameroon ===
Coach: (Socialist Federal Republic of Yugoslavia) Radivoje Ognjanović

No.	Pos.	Player	Date of birth (age)	Caps	Goals	Club
1	GK	Joseph-Antoine Bell	8 October 1954 (aged 29)			(Egyptian Football Association) Al Mokawloon Al Arab
16	GK	Thomas Nkono	20 July 1955 (aged 28)			(Royal Spanish Football Federation) RCD Espanyol
23	GK	Jacques Songo'o	17 March 1964 (aged 19)			(Cameroonian Football Federation) Canon Yaoundé
18	DF	Ibrahim Aoudou	August 23, 1955 (aged 28)			(French Football Federation) Cannes
6	DF	Emmanuel Kundé	July 15, 1956 (aged 27)			(Cameroonian Football Federation) Canon Yaoundé
14	DF	Luc Mbassi	1 January 1957 (aged 27)			(Cameroonian Football Federation) Tonnerre Yaoundé
4	DF	René Ndjeya	October 9, 1953 (aged 30)			(Cameroonian Football Federation) Union Douala
15	DF	François Ndoumbé	January 30, 1954 (aged 30)			(Cameroonian Football Federation) Union Douala
3	DF	Isaac Sinkot	July 11, 1954 (aged 29)			(Cameroonian Football Federation) Dynamo Douala
19	DF	Edmond Enoka	17 December 1955 (aged 28)			(Cameroonian Football Federation) Dynamo Douala
14	MF	Théophile Abega	July 9, 1954 (aged 29)			(Cameroonian Football Federation) Canon Yaoundé
8	MF	Grégoire Mbida	January 27, 1952 (aged 32)			(French Football Federation) SC Bastia
22	MF	Elie Onana	October 13, 1951 (aged 32)			(Cameroonian Football Federation) Tonnerre Yaoundé
7	MF	Charles Toubé	January 22, 1958 (aged 26)			(Cameroonian Football Federation) Tonnerre Yaoundé
17	MF	Nicolas Makon				(Cameroonian Football Federation) Rail Douala
5	MF	Hermann Kingué	September 21, 1961 (aged 22)			(Italian Football Federation) ASD Chieti
12	FW	Bonaventure Djonkep	August 20, 1961 (aged 22)			(Cameroonian Football Federation) Union Douala
13	FW	Ernest Ebongué	May 15, 1962 (aged 21)			(Cameroonian Football Federation) Tonnerre Yaoundé
21	FW	Alain Eyobo	October 17, 1961 (aged 22)			(Cameroonian Football Federation) Dynamo Douala
9	FW	Roger Milla	May 20, 1952 (aged 31)			(French Football Federation) SC Bastia
11	FW	Jacques N'Guea	November 8, 1955 (aged 28)			(Cameroonian Football Federation) Canon Yaounde
10	FW	Dagobert Dang	February 6, 1958 (aged 26)			(Cameroonian Football Federation) Canon Yaoundé

=== Ivory Coast ===
Coach: (Brazil) Duque

No.	Pos.	Player	Date of birth (age)	Caps	Goals	Club
1	GK	Koffi Kouadio	February 6, 1951 (aged 33)			(Ivorian Football Federation) ASEC Mimosas
3	DF	Gaston Adjoukoua	February 14, 1958 (aged 26)			(Ivorian Football Federation) Africa Sports
17	DF	Emile Gnahoré				(Ivorian Football Federation) Africa Sports
5	DF	François Monguéhi	November 29, 1962 (aged 21)			(Ivorian Football Federation) Africa Sports
4	DF	Aimé Tchétché	January 10, 1964 (aged 20)			(Ivorian Football Federation) Africa Sports
16	MF	Ignace Guédé	October 10, 1964 (aged 19)			(Ivorian Football Federation) Africa Sports
	MF	Jean-Michel Guédé	December 31, 1965 (aged 18)			(French Football Federation) Montpellier
12	MF	Pascal Miézan	April 3, 1959 (aged 24)			(Ivorian Football Federation) Africa Sports
6	MF	Saint-Joseph Gadji-Celi	February 20, 1963 (aged 21)			(Ivorian Football Federation) ASEC Mimosas
	MF	François Zahoui	September 21, 1961 (aged 22)			(French Football Federation) Nancy
11	FW	Youssouf Fofana	July 26, 1966 (aged 17)			(Ivorian Football Federation) ASEC Mimosas
9	FW	Michel Goba	August 8, 1961 (aged 22)			(French Football Federation) Angoulême
7	FW	Désiré Sikély	January 27, 1951 (aged 33)			(French Football Federation) Sète
15	MF	Kablan Miézan				(Ivorian Football Federation) Africa Sports
	DF	Patrice Lago				(Ivorian Football Federation) Africa Sports
	DF	Gnato Gbala	June 4, 1964 (aged 19)			(French Football Federation) Créteil
	FW	Moïse Kien Dri				
10	MF	Tia Koffi				

=== Egypt ===
Coach: Saleh El Wahsh

No.	Pos.	Player	Date of birth (age)	Caps	Goals	Club
1	GK	Thabet El-Batal	16 September 1953 (aged 30)			(Egyptian Football Association) Al-Ahly
16	GK	Ekramy El-Shahat	16 October 1955 (aged 28)			(Egyptian Football Association) Al-Ahly
2	DF	Ali Shehata	25 April 1959 (aged 24)			(Egyptian Football Association) Al Moqaweloon Al Arab
18	DF	Hamada Sedki	25 August 1961 (aged 22)			(Egyptian Football Association) El Minya SC
3	DF	Rabie Yassin	7 September 1960 (aged 23)			(Egyptian Football Association) Al-Ahly
5	DF	Ibrahim Youssef	January 1, 1959 (aged 25)			(Egyptian Football Association) Zamalek SC
9	MF	Magdi Abdelghani	July 27, 1959 (aged 24)			(Egyptian Football Association) Al-Ahly
12	MF	Taher Abouzaid	April 1, 1962 (aged 21)			(Egyptian Football Association) Al-Ahly
8	MF	Shawky Ghareeb	February 26, 1959 (aged 25)			(Egyptian Football Association) Ghazl El-Mehalla
4	MF	Mohamed Radwan	25 March 1958 (aged 25)			(Egyptian Football Association) Al Moqaweloon Al Arab
15	MF	Mahmoud Hassan Saleh	May 4, 1962 (aged 21)			(Egyptian Football Association) Ismaily SC
	FW	Adel Abdelwahed	17 April 1959 (aged 24)			(Egyptian Football Association) Zamalek SC
13	FW	Naser Mohamed Ali	21 February 1961 (aged 23)			(Egyptian Football Association) Al Moqaweloon Al Arab
10	FW	Mahmoud El Khatib	October 30, 1954 (aged 29)			(Egyptian Football Association) Al-Ahly
14	FW	Zakaria Nassef	May 4, 1960 (aged 23)			(Egyptian Football Association) Al-Ahly
	FW	Hamdi Nouh	23 February 1955 (aged 29)			(Egyptian Football Association) Al Moqaweloon Al Arab
11	FW	Emad Soliman	July 23, 1959 (aged 24)			(Egyptian Football Association) Ismaily SC

=== Togo ===
Coach: (West Germany) Gottlieb Göller

No.	Pos.	Player	Date of birth (age)	Caps	Goals	Club
	GK	Yaovi Assogba				(Togolese Football Federation) OC Agaza
	DF	Sanunu Essoazina				(Togolese Football Federation) AC Semassi
	DF	Denké Kossi Wazo	May 18, 1958 (aged 25)			(Togolese Football Federation) Aiglons de Lomé
	DF	Kodjovi Mawuéna	December 31, 1959 (aged 24)			(Togolese Football Federation) OC Agaza
	DF	Alassani Nassirou				(Togolese Football Federation) AC Semassi
	DF	Koami Dos Reis				(Togolese Football Federation) OC Agaza
	MF	Djogou Akoulassi Tao				(Togolese Football Federation) OC Agaza
	MF	Messan Efoé				(Togolese Football Federation) Aiglons de Lomé
	MF	Sunu Mawuli				(Togolese Football Federation) Gomido FC
	MF	Messan Modjro				(Togolese Football Federation) ASFOSA
	MF	Adjé Da Silveira				(Togolese Football Federation) Étoile Filante du Togo
	FW	Rafiou Moutairou	October 11, 1960 (aged 23)			(Togolese Football Federation) OC Agaza
	MF	Abdoul Faye				(Togolese Football Federation) Doumbé FC
	FW	Sadou Boukari	January 15, 1966 (aged 18)			(Togolese Football Federation) Ifodje Atakpamé
	FW	Kwashie Ayité Ayivor				(Togolese Football Federation) ASFOSA
	FW	Ali Mamane				(Togolese Football Federation) Aiglons de Lomé
	FW	Abdel Karim Gamel				(Togolese Football Federation) OC Agaza

== Group B ==
=== Algeria ===
Coach: Mahieddine Khalef

No.	Pos.	Player	Date of birth (age)	Caps	Goals	Club
1	GK	Mehdi Cerbah	3 April 1953 (aged 30)			(Algerian Football Federation) RS Kouba
2	DF	Mahmoud Guendouz	4 February 1953 (aged 31)			(Algerian Football Federation) MA Hussein Dey
3	DF	Faouzi Mansouri	17 January 1956 (aged 28)			(French Football Federation) Mulhouse
4	DF	Nourredine Kourichi	12 April 1954 (aged 29)			(French Football Federation) Lille
5	DF	Abdelhamid Bouras	25 June 1959 (aged 24)			(Algerian Football Federation) ISM Aïn Beïda
6	MF	Mohamed Kaci Said	2 May 1958 (aged 25)			(Algerian Football Federation) RS Kouba
7	FW	Nasser Bouiche	8 June 1960 (aged 23)			(Algerian Football Federation) MP Alger
8	MF	Ali Fergani (c)	21 September 1952 (aged 31)			(Algerian Football Federation) JE Tizi Ouzou
9	FW	Hamid Lefdjah	16 December 1960 (aged 23)			(Algerian Football Federation) ASC Oran
10	MF	Lakhdar Belloumi	29 December 1958 (aged 25)			(Algerian Football Federation) GCR Mascara
11	FW	Rabah Madjer	15 December 1958 (aged 25)			(French Football Federation) RC Paris
12	FW	Tedj Bensaoula	1 December 1954 (aged 29)			(French Football Federation) Le Havre
13	FW	Djamel Menad	22 July 1960 (aged 23)			(Algerian Football Federation) JE Tizi Ouzou
14	FW	Djamel Zidane	28 April 1955 (aged 28)			(Royal Belgian Football Association) KV Kortrijk
15	FW	Nacer Bouiche	18 June 1963 (aged 20)			(Algerian Football Federation) JE Tizi Ouzou
16	DF	Boualem Laroum	17 June 1959 (aged 24)			(Algerian Football Federation) CM Belcourt
17	MF	Hocine Yahi	25 April 1960 (aged 23)			(Algerian Football Federation) CM Belcourt
18	DF	Abdelhamid Sadmi	1 January 1961 (aged 23)			(Algerian Football Federation) JE Tizi Ouzou
19	DF	Mohamed Chaib	20 May 1957 (aged 26)			(Algerian Football Federation) RS Kouba
20	MF	Djamel Jefjef	30 January 1961 (aged 23)			(Algerian Football Federation) USM El Harrach
21	GK	Kamel Kadri	19 November 1963 (aged 20)			(Algerian Football Federation) JE Tizi Ouzou
22	GK	Nacerdine Drid	22 January 1957 (aged 27)			(Algerian Football Federation) ESM Bel Abbès

=== Ghana ===
Coach : Emmanuel Kwasi Afranie

No.	Pos.	Player	Date of birth (age)	Caps	Goals	Club
	GK	Joe Carr				(Ghana Football Association) Asante Kotoko
	GK	Michael Owusu Mensah				(Ghana Football Association) Hearts of Oak
	GK	Mohammed Odoom				(Ghana Football Association) Okwawu United
	DF	Ernest Appau				(Ghana Football Association) Asante Kotoko
	DF	Joseph Odoi	September 23, 1968 (aged 15)			(Ghana Football Association) Hearts of Oak
	DF	Akwasi Appiah	June 30, 1960 (aged 23)			(Ghana Football Association) Asante Kotoko
	DF	Hesse Odamtten	February 5, 1959 (aged 25)			(Ghana Football Association) Hearts of Oak
	DF	Isaac Acquaye	1953			(Ghana Football Association) Great Olympics
	MF	Addae Kyenkyehene	November 14, 1955 (aged 28)			(Ghana Football Association) Asante Kotoko
	DF	Seth Ampadu				(Ghana Football Association) Hearts of Oak
	DF	Isaac Paha (c)	May 23, 1953 (aged 30)			(Ghana Football Association) Sekondi Hasaacas
	MF	Albert Asaase				(Ghana Football Association) Asante Kotoko
	FW	Papa Arko	June 2, 1960 (aged 23)			(Ghana Football Association) Asante Kotoko
	MF	Karim Abdul Razak	April 18, 1956 (aged 27)			(Egyptian Football Association) Al Mokawloon Al Arab
	FW	Opoku Sampene				(Ghana Football Association)
	MF	Mohammed Polo	November 11, 1956 (aged 27)			(United Arab Emirates Football Association) Al Wasl
	FW	Opoku Nti	January 23, 1961 (aged 23)			(Ghana Football Association) Asante Kotoko
	FW	Francis Kumi	1959			(French Football Federation) Girondins de Bordeaux
	FW	John Smith Bannerman				(Ghana Football Association) Asante Kotoko
	DF	Windsor Koffi Abbrey				(Ghana Football Association) Hearts of Oak
	FW	George Alhassan	November 11, 1955 (aged 28)			(Gabonese Football Federation) FC 105 Libreville
	FW	Ben Kayede				(Ghana Football Association) Great Olympics

=== Malawi ===
Coach: (Scotland) Danny McLennan

No.	Pos.	Player	Date of birth (age)	Caps	Goals	Club
	GK	Clement Mwkalula	July 19, 1955 (aged 28)			(Football Association of Malawi) ADMarC Tigers
	DF	Harry Waya	May 9, 1957 (aged 26)			(Football Association of Malawi) Bata Bullets
	DF	Young Chimodzi	August 1, 1961 (aged 22)			(Football Association of Malawi) Silver Strikers
	DF	Jack Chamangwana	April 30, 1957 (aged 26)			(Football Association of Malawi) Limbe Leaf Wanderers
	DF	Gilbert Chirwa	March 13, 1961 (aged 22)			(Football Association of Malawi) Bata Bullets
	DF	Dickson Mbetewa	July 19, 1955 (aged 28)			(Football Association of Malawi) Silver Strikers
	DF	Patson Nyengo	January 3, 1960 (aged 24)			(Football Association of Malawi)
	MF	Jonathan Billie	October 31, 1958 (aged 25)			(Football Association of Malawi) ADMarC Tigers
	FW	Sito Mfarinya				(Football Association of Malawi) Limbe Leaf Wanderers
	MF	Collins Thewe				(Football Association of Malawi) Red Lions
	MF	Holman Malunga	May 13, 1965 (aged 18)			(Football Association of Malawi) Limbe Leaf Wanderers
	FW	Ricky Phuka	June 13, 1965 (aged 18)			(Football Association of Malawi) Limbe Leaf Wanderers
	MF	Moses Majiga				(Football Association of Malawi)
	MF	Peter Amosi				(Football Association of Malawi) CivO United
	FW	Henry Chikunje				(Football Association of Malawi)
	FW	Clifton Msiya	May 16, 1964 (aged 19)			(Football Association of Malawi) Berec Power Pack

=== Nigeria ===
Coach: Festus Onigbinde

No.	Pos.	Player	Date of birth (age)	Caps	Goals	Club
22	GK	Patrick Okala				(Nigeria Football Federation) Enugu Rangers
	GK	Peter Rufai	August 24, 1963 (aged 20)			(Nigeria Football Federation) Stationery Stores
	DF	Paul Kingsley				(Nigeria Football Federation) Wunti Bauchi
4	DF	Stephen Keshi	January 31, 1962 (aged 22)			(Nigeria Football Federation) New Nigeria Bank
	DF	Sunday Eboigbe	December 28, 1967 (aged 16)			(Nigeria Football Federation) New Nigeria Bank
	DF	Yisa Shofoluwe	December 28, 1967 (aged 16)			(Nigeria Football Federation) Abiola Babes
	DF	Ibrahim Mohamed				(Nigeria Football Federation) Shooting Stars
19	MF	Mudashiru Lawal	June 8, 1954 (aged 29)			(Nigeria Football Federation) Shooting Stars
	MF	Chibuzor Ehilegbu	April 30, 1964 (aged 19)			(Nigeria Football Federation) Leventis United
	FW	Humphrey Edobor	March 12, 1966 (aged 17)			(Nigeria Football Federation) New Nigeria Bank
	MF	Clement Temile				(Nigeria Football Federation) Bendel Insurance
	MF	Ademola Adeshina	June 4, 1964 (aged 19)			(Nigeria Football Federation) Shooting Stars
	MF	James Etokebe	February 16, 1962 (aged 22)			(Nigeria Football Federation) Leventis United
	MF	Henry Nwosu	June 14, 1963 (aged 20)			(Nigeria Football Federation) New Nigeria Bank
	FW	Rashidi Yekini	October 23, 1963 (aged 20)			(Nigeria Football Federation) Shooting Stars
	DF	Benson Edema	October 21, 1965 (aged 18)			(Nigeria Football Federation) New Nigeria Bank
	FW	Tarila Okorowanta	March 16, 1965 (aged 18)			(Nigeria Football Federation) Bendel Insurance
	FW	Bala Ali	August 16, 1968 (aged 15)			(Nigeria Football Federation) Leventis United
	DF	Paul Lucky Okoku	December 27, 1965 (aged 18)			(Nigeria Football Federation) Leventis United
