= 1984 African Cup of Nations final =

- Event: 1984 African Cup of Nations
Cameroon	Nigeria
(Cameroon)	(Nigeria)
3	1
- Date: 18 March 1984
- Venue: Stade Félix Houphouët-Boigny, Abidjan
- Referee: Ali Bennaceur (Tunisia)
- Attendance: 27,456

The 1984 African Cup of Nations final was a football match that took place on 18 March 1984, and was the final match of the 14th edition of the Africa Cup of Nations). It was hosted by Côte d'Ivoire at the Stade Félix Houphouët-Boigny in Abidjan. Cameroon won its first championship, beating Nigeria in the final 3−1.

== Road to the final ==
Cameroon		Nigeria	
Opponents	Results	Opponents	Results
Group stage
Egypt	0–1	Ghana	2–1
Togo	4–1	Malawi	2–2
Ivory Coast	2–0	Algeria	0–0
Semi-finals
Algeria	0–0 (5–4 p)	Egypt	2–2 (8–7 p)

== Match ==
=== Details ===
18 March 1984

Cameroon	3–1	Nigeria
N'Djeya 32'; Abega 79'; Ebongué 84'	Report	Lawal 10'

Stade Félix Houphouët-Boigny, Abidjan
Attendance: 27,456
Referee: Ali Bennaceur (Tunisia)

Cameroon	Nigeria

GK	Joseph-Antoine Bell
RB	Ibrahim Aoudou
CB	Rene N'Djeya
CB	Isaac Sinkot
LB	François N'Doumbé
CM	Charles Toubé
CM	Théophile Abega (c)
CM	Grégoire M'Bida
RW	Ernest Ebongué
CF	Bonaventure Djonkep	(substituted off) 84'
LW	Roger Milla
Substitutions:
DF	Emmanuel Kundé	(substituted on) 84'
Manager:
(Socialist Federal Republic of Yugoslavia) Radivoje Ognjanović

GK	Patrick Okala
RB	Stephen Keshi (c)
CB	Sunday Eboigbe
CB	Paul Kingsley
LB	Yisa Sofoluwe
RM	Henry Nwosu
CM	Ademola Adeshina	(substituted off) 83'
CM	Mudashiru Lawal
LM	James Etokebe
CF	Bala Ali	(substituted off) 46'
CF	Humphrey Edobor
Substitutions:
MF	Clement Temile	(substituted on) 46'
MF	Paul Okoku	(substituted on) 83'
Manager:
Chris Udemezue

Assistant referees:
...
...
