= Algeria national football team results (1980–1989) =

This page is a list of all the matches that Algeria national football team has played between 1980 and 1989.

== 1980 ==
9 March 1980 1980 AFCON GS	Ghana	0–0	Algeria	Ibadan, Nigeria
		Report		Stadium: Liberty Stadium; Attendance: 40,000; Referee: Youssef El Ghoul (Libya)

13 March 1980 1980 AFCON GS	Algeria	1–0	Morocco	Ibadan, Nigeria
	Belloumi 90+3'	Report		Stadium: Liberty Stadium; Attendance: 20,000; Referee: Ali Dridi (Tunisia)

16 March 1980 1980 AFCON GS	Algeria	3–2	Guinea	Ibadan, Nigeria
	Bensaoula 12', 49'; Belloumi 37'	Report	Diawara 82'; Bangoura 90+1'	Stadium: Liberty Stadium; Attendance: 20,000; Referee: Idrissa Traoré (Mali)

19 March 1980 1980 AFCON SF	Algeria	2–2 (4–2 p)	Egypt	Ibadan, Nigeria
	Assad 55' (pen.); Benmiloudi 62'	Report	El Khatib 32'; El Sayed 47'	Stadium: Liberty Stadium; Attendance: 5,000; Referee: Théophile Lawson-Hétchéli (Togo)
	Penalties
	Belloumi (penalty scored); Fergani (penalty scored); Khedis (penalty scored); Larbès (penalty missed); Assad (penalty scored)		(penalty scored) Shehata; (penalty scored) Mokhtar; (penalty missed) El Khatib; (penalty missed) Amer

22 March 1980 1980 AFCON F	Nigeria	3–0	Algeria	Ibadan, Nigeria
	Odegbami 2', 42'; Lawal 50'	Report		Stadium: Liberty Stadium; Attendance: 85,000; Referee: Gebreyesus Tesfaye (Ethiopia)

31 May 1980 1982 FIFA WC qualification	Sierra Leone	2–2	Algeria	Freetown, Sierra Leone
	Noah 58'; Dyfan 60'	Report	Bensaoula 72'; Belloumi 85'	Stadium: Brookfields National Stadium; Attendance: 36,500; Referee: Tevi Lawson-Hetcheli (Togo)

13 June 1980 1982 FIFA WC qualification	Algeria	3–1	Sierra Leone	Oran, Algeria
	Fergani 42'; Bensaoula 47'; Madjer 78'	Report	Sento 79'	Stadium: 19 June Stadium, Algeria; Attendance: 12,636; Referee: Yousef El-Ghoul (Libya)

20 July 1980 1980 Olympic Games GS	Algeria	3–0	Syria	Minsk, USSR
	Belloumi 36'; Madjer 48'; Merzekane 73' (pen.)	Report		Stadium: Dinamo Stadium; Referee: Vojtech Christov (Czechoslovakia)

22 July 1980 1980 Olympic Games GS	East Germany	1–0	Algeria	Kyiv, USSR
	Terletzki 61'	Report		Stadium: Republican Stadium; Attendance: 70.000; Referee: Romualdo Arppi Filho (Brazil)

24 July 1980 1980 Olympic Games GS	Spain	1–1	Algeria	Minsk, USSR
	Rincón 38'	Report	Belloumi 63'	Stadium: Dinamo Stadium; Referee: Eldar Azimzade (Soviet Union)

27 July 1980 1980 Olympic Games QF	Yugoslavia	3–0	Algeria	Minsk, USSR
	Miročević 5'; Šestić 19'; Zoran Vujović 70'	Report		Stadium: Dinamo Stadium; Referee: Klaus Scheurell (East Germany)

19 November 1980 Friendlies	Poland	5–1	Algeria	Kraków, Poland
	Kupcewicz 9'; Ciołek 15'; Iwan 38', 73'; Dziuba 69'	(Report)	Ouamar Ghrib 85'	Stadium: Suche Stawy Stadium, Kraków; Attendance: 7,000; Referee: Velichko Tsonchev (Bulgaria)

4 December 1980 Friendlies	Algeria	4–1	China	Constantine, Algeria
	Ghrib; Bensaoula 30'; Kaci-Saïd ? (o.g.)		?	Stadium: 17 June Stadium

12 December 1980 1982 FIFA WC qualification	Algeria	2–0	Sudan	Constantine, Algeria
	Bensaoula 9'; Fergani 45'	Report		Stadium: 17 June Stadium; Attendance: 50,000; Referee: Aissaoui Boudabbous (Tunisia)

28 December 1980 1982 FIFA WC qualification	Sudan	1–1	Algeria	Khartoum, Sudan
	Cheikh 80'	Report	Gamouh 65'	Stadium: Khartoum Stadium; Attendance: 28,385; Referee: Yousef El-Ghoul (Libya)

== 1981 ==
3 April 1981 Friendlies	Algeria	2–0	Senegal	Oran, Algeria
	Kouici 39'; Assad 44' (pen.)			Stadium: 19 June Stadium

10 April 1981 1982 AFCON qualification	Algeria	5–1	Mali	Oran, Algeria
	Bensaoula 18'; Guendouz 28'; Madjer 56', 71'; I. Traoré 72' (o.g.)	Report	Bagayoko 12'	Stadium: 19 June Stadium; Attendance: 40.000; Referee: Tesfaye Gebreyesus (Ethiopia)

19 April 1981 1982 AFCON qualification	Mali	3–0	Algeria	Bamako, Mali
	I. Traoré 27'; B. Traoré 29'; Bagayoko 85'	Report		Stadium: Stade Modibo Kéïta; Attendance: 30.000

1 May 1981 1982 FIFA WC qualification	Algeria	4–0	Niger	Constantine, Algeria
	Madjer 44'; Belloumi 46', 77'; Korichi 53'	Report		Stadium: 17 June Stadium; Attendance: 60,000; Referee: Doudou N'Jie (Gambia)

31 May 1981 1982 FIFA WC qualification	Niger	1–0	Algeria	Niamey, Niger
	Seydou 90'	Report		Stadium: Stade du 29 Juillet; Attendance: 7,000; Referee: Benjamin Dwomoh (Ghana)

30 August 1981 1982 AFCON qualification	Algeria	7–0	Burkina Faso	Oran, Algeria
	Madjer 31', 37'; Belloumi 53', 56'; Aït El-Hocine 68', 80'; Assad 81'	Report		Stadium: 19 June Stadium; Attendance: 50.000; Referee: Yousef El-Ghoul (Libya)

20 September 1981 1982 AFCON qualification	Burkina Faso	1–1	Algeria	Ouagadougou, Upper Volta
	Ouattara 81'	Report	Sidibé 18' (o.g.)	Stadium: Stade Municipal; Attendance: 20.000; Referee: Benjamin Dwomoh (Ghana)

10 October 1981 1982 FIFA WC qualification	Nigeria	0–2	Algeria	Lagos, Nigeria
		Report	Belloumi 34'; Zidane 44'	Stadium: Surulere Stadium; Attendance: 80,000; Referee: Luigi Agnolin (Italy)

30 October 1981 1982 FIFA WC qualification	Algeria	2–1	Nigeria	Constantine
	Belloumi 9'; Madjer 85'	Report	Owolabi 40'	Stadium: 17 June Stadium; Attendance: 60,000; Referee: André Daina (Switzerland)

== 1982 ==
7 February 1982 Friendlies	Tunisia	0–1	Algeria	Tunis, Tunisia
			Assad 56'	Stadium: El Menzah Stadium

7 March 1982 1982 AFCON GS	Algeria	1–0	Zambia	Benghazi, Libya
	Merzekane 85'	Report		Stadium: 28 March Stadium; Attendance: 5,000; Referee: Dodou N'Jie (Gambia)

10 March 1982 1982 AFCON GS	Algeria	2–1	Nigeria	Benghazi, Libya
	Isima 44' (o.g.); Assad 65'	Report	Osigwe 40'	Stadium: 28 March Stadium; Attendance: 5,000; Referee: Cheikh Djibril MBaye (Senegal)

13 March 1982 1982 AFCON GS	Algeria	0–0	Ethiopia	Benghazi, Libya
		Report		Stadium: 28 March Stadium; Attendance: 5,000; Referee: Hugues Opangault

16 March 1982 1982 AFCON SF	Ghana	3–2 (a.e.t)	Algeria	Benghazi, Libya
	Alhassan 4', 103'; Opoku Nti 90'	Report	Zidane 29'; Assad 62'	Stadium: 28 March Stadium; Attendance: 5,000; Referee: Bester Kalombo (Malawi)

18 March 1982 1982 AFCON TPM	Zambia	2–0	Algeria	Tripoli, Libya
	Kaumba 2'; Munshya 25'	Report		Stadium: 11 June Stadium; Attendance: 2,000; Referee: Cheikh Djibril MBaye (Senegal)

25 April 1982 Friendlies	Algeria	1–1	Peru	Algiers, Algeria
	Madjer 89'		Cueto 35'	Stadium: Stade du 5 Juillet

28 April 1982 Friendlies	Algeria	2–0	Republic of Ireland	Algiers, Algeria
	Assad 15'; Madjer 64'	(Report)		Stadium: Stade du 5 Juillet; Attendance: 65,000; Referee: Daniel Lambert (France)

16 June 1982 1982 FIFA WC GS	West Germany	1–2	Algeria	Gijón, Spain
17:15 CEST	Rummenigge 67'	Report	Madjer 54'; Belloumi 68'	Stadium: El Molinón; Attendance: 42,000; Referee: Enrique Labo Revoredo (Peru)

21 June 1982 1982 FIFA WC GS	Algeria	0–2	Austria	Oviedo, Spain
17:15 CEST		Report	Schachner 55'; Krankl 67'	Stadium: Estadio Carlos Tartiere; Attendance: 22,000; Referee: Tony Boskovic (Australia)

24 June 1982 1982 FIFA WC GS	Algeria	3–2	Chile	Oviedo, Spain
17:15 CEST	Assad 7', 31'; Bensaoula 35'	Report	Neira 59' (pen.); Letelier 73'	Stadium: Estadio Carlos Tartiere; Attendance: 16,000; Referee: Rómulo Méndez (Guatemala)

19 December 1982 Friendlies	Tunisia	0–1	Algeria	Tunis, Tunisia
			Guemri 56'	Stadium: El Menzah Stadium

== 1983 ==
8 April 1983 1984 AFCON qualification	Algeria	6–2	Benin	Algiers, Algeria
	Bensaoula 2', 5'; Jafjaf 10'; Madjer 13', 69'; Menad 46'	Report	Korego 75'; Agouyou 88'	Stadium: Stade 5 Juillet 1962; Attendance: 28.671; Referee: Modilo N'Diaye (Mali)

26 April 1983 1984 AFCON qualification	Benin	1–1	Algeria	Cotonou, Benin
	Foly 28'	Report	Madjer 50'	Stadium: Stade de l'Amitié; Attendance: 10.000

29 May 1983 1984 Olympic Games qualification	Uganda	4–1	Algeria	Kampala, Ouganda
	Kateregga 4'; Omondi 53', 89'; Sekatawa 88'		Yahi 82'	Stadium: Nakivubo Stadium; Attendance: 30.000; Referee: Mustapha Issa Badaoui (Sudan)

10 June 1983 1984 Olympic Games qualification	Algeria	3–0	Uganda	Algiers, Algeria
	Madjer 49' (pen.); Bensaoula 64'; Bencheikh 77'			Stadium: Stade du 5 Juillet; Attendance: 34.000; Referee: Walid Ben Hamida (Tunisia)

7 August 1983 Friendlies	Algeria	2–3	Bulgaria	Paris, France
	Menad 4'; Dimitrov 66' (o.g.)		Zdravkov 28'; Sadakov 52', 65'	Stadium: Stade de Saint-Denis; Attendance: 2.500

13 August 1983 1984 AFCON qualification	Senegal	1–1	Algeria	Dakar, Senegal
	Tewu 68'	Report	Bensaoula 63'	Stadium: Stade Demba Diop; Attendance: 40.000; Referee: Ali Benaceur (Tunisia)

25 August 1983 Friendlies	Algeria	3–0	Ivory Coast	Algiers, Algeria
	Yahi 60'; Tlemçani 61'; Kourichi 70'			Stadium: Stade du 5 Juillet

28 August 1983 1984 AFCON qualification	Algeria	2–0	Senegal	Algiers, Algeria
	Madjer 3'; Yahi 55'	Report		Stadium: Stade du 5 Juillet; Attendance: 28.215

11 September 1983 1983 Mediterranean Games GS	Tunisia	3–2	Algeria	El Jadida, Morocco
	Hergal 10'; Rakbaoui 31'; Ben Messaoud 43'		Belloumi 36'; Guendouz 89' (pen.)	Stadium: Ben M'Hamed El Abdi Stadium; Attendance: 15.000; Referee: Mohamed Hossam Eddine (Egypt)

13 September 1983 1983 Mediterranean Games GS	Turkey B	0–1	Algeria	El Jadida, Morocco
			Guendouz 30'	Stadium: Ben M'Hamed El Abdi Stadium

14 October 1983 1984 Olympic Games qualification	Libya	2–0	Algeria	Tripoli, Libya
	Al-Meliani 53'; Al-Marghani 71' (pen.)		Tlemçani 83'	Stadium: 11 June Stadium; Attendance: 30.000; Referee: ... Kakalo (Congo)

28 October 1983 1984 Olympic Games qualification	Algeria	2–0	Libya	Algiers, Algeria
	Belloumi 16'; Merzekane 71'			Stadium: Stade du 5 Juillet; Attendance: 48.850; Referee: Karim Camara (Guinea)

30 November 1983 Friendlies	Algeria	1–2	Switzerland	Algiers, Algeria
	Bencheikh 22'		Jaccard 35'; Hermann 89'	Stadium: Stade du 5 Juillet; Attendance: 25.184; Referee: Belaïd Lacarne (Algeria)

== 1984 ==
6 January 1984 1984 Olympic Games qualification	Algeria	1–1	Egypt	Algiers, Algeria
	Bensaoula 1'		Youssef 39'	Stadium: Stade du 5 Juillet; Attendance: 38.250; Referee: Ali Bin Nasser (Tunisia)

7 February 1984 Friendly	Algeria	1–1	Romania	Algiers, Algeria
	Bencheikh 80'		Guendouz 73' (o.g.)	Stadium: Stade du 5 Juillet; Attendance: 15,000; Referee: Mohamed Tighilt (Algeria)

17 February 1984 1984 Olympic Games qualification	Egypt	1–0	Algeria	Cairo, Egypt
	Nabiel 57'			Stadium: Cairo International Stadium; Attendance: 120.000; Referee: Cheikh Djibril M'Baye (Senegal)

21 February 1984 Friendly	Saudi Arabia	4–2	Algeria	Riyadh, Saudi Arabia
	Abdullah 3' (pen.), 73'; Khalifa 13'; Al-Nafisah 90'		Zidane 30', 58'	Stadium: Prince Faisal bin Fahd Stadium; Referee: Fallaj Al-Shanar (Saudi Arabia)

5 March 1984 1984 AFCON GS	Algeria	3–0	Malawi	Bouaké, Ivory Coast
	Bouiche 29'; Belloumi 36'; Fergani 38'	Report		Stadium: Stade de Bouaké; Attendance: 10,000; Referee: Bakary Sarr (Senegal)

8 March 1984 1984 AFCON GS	Algeria	2–0	Ghana	Bouaké, Ivory Coast
	Menad 75'; Bensaoula 85'	Report		Stadium: Stade de Bouaké; Attendance: 15,000; Referee: Mohamed Bahhou (Morocco)

11 March 1984 1984 AFCON GS	Algeria	0–0	Nigeria	Bouaké, Ivory Coast
		Report		Stadium: Stade de Bouaké; Attendance: 3,000; Referee: Karim Camara (Guinea)

14 March 1984 1984 AFCON SF	Algeria	0–0 (4–5 p)	Cameroon	Abidjan, Ivory Coast
		Report		Stadium: Stade Félix Houphouët-Boigny; Attendance: 15,000; Referee: Edwin Picon-Ackong (Mauritius)
	Penalties
	Belloumi (penalty scored); Yahi (penalty scored); Kaci-Saïd (penalty scored); Guendouz (penalty missed); Madjer (penalty scored)		(penalty scored) Kundé; (penalty scored) Ebongué; (penalty scored) Aoudou; (penalty scored) Bell; (penalty scored) Ndoumbé

17 March 1984 1984 AFCON TPM	Algeria	3–1	Egypt	Abidjan, Ivory Coast
	Madjer 67'; Belloumi 70'; Yahi 88'	Report	Abdelghani 74' (pen.)	Stadium: Stade Félix Houphouët-Boigny; Attendance: 500; Referee: Mohamed Larache (Morocco)

10 October 1984 Friendly	East Germany	5–2	Algeria	Aue, East Germany
	Stahmann 20'; Rohde 25'; Ernst 44', 70'; Streich 86'		Belloumi 85'; Menad 88'	Stadium: Otto Grotewohl Stadion; Attendance: 8,000; Referee: Lajos Németh (Hungary)

16 October 1984 Friendly	Algeria	1–0	Canada	Algiers, Algeria
				Stadium: Stade du 5 Juillet

28 December 1984 Tournoi de l'Amitié	Algeria	1–2	Ghana	Abidjan, Ivory Coast
	Yahi 30'		Goal	Stadium: Stade Félix Houphouët-Boigny

30 December 1984 Tournoi de l'Amitié	Algeria	3–1	Tunisia	Abidjan, Ivory Coast
	Jefjef 25', 60'; Yahi 75'		Hsoumi (pen.)	Stadium: Stade Félix Houphouët-Boigny

== 1985 ==
1 January 1985 Tournoi de l'Amitié	Ivory Coast	1–1	Algeria	Abidjan, Ivory Coast
	Goal		Menad 60'	Stadium: Stade Félix Houphouët-Boigny

8 March 1985 1986 AFCON qualification	Algeria	4–0	Mauritania	Algiers, Algeria
	Belloumi 6' (pen.); Bouiche 27'; Cissé 58' (o.g.); Menad 68'			Stadium: Stade du 5 Juillet; Attendance: 4,000; Referee: Habib Mimouni (Tunisia)

13 March 1985 Friendly	Algeria	1–1	East Germany	Batna, Algeria
	Yahi 60'		Schulz 84'	Stadium: 1 November 1954 Stadium; Attendance: 25,000

22 March 1985 1986 AFCON qualification	Mauritania	1–1	Algeria	Nouakchott, Mauritania
	Dieng 19'		Bouiche 43'	Stadium: Stade Olympique; Attendance: 12,000; Referee: Cheikh D'Jibril M'Baye (Senegal)

31 March 1985 1986 FIFA WC qualification	Angola	0–0	Algeria	Luanda, Angola
				Stadium: Estádio dos Coqueiros; Attendance: 20,000; Referee: Karim Camara (Guinea)

19 April 1984 1986 FIFA WC qualification	Algeria	3–2	Angola	Algiers, Algeria
	Mansouri 14'; Menad 42'; Bouiche 65'		Jesus 78'; Machado 83'	Stadium: Stade du 5 Juillet; Attendance: 50,000; Referee: Idrissa Traoré (Mali)

1 May 1985 Friendly	Tunisia	1–0	Algeria	Tunis, Tunisia
	Maâloul			Stadium: El Menzah Stadium

13 July 1985	Algeria	2–0	Zambia	Alger, Algérie

28 July 1985	Zambia	0–1	Algeria	Lusaka, Zambia

4 July 1985	Kenya	0–0	Algeria	Nairobi, Kenya

18 July 1985	Algeria	3–0	Kenya	Alger, Algérie

6 October 1985	Tunisia	1–4	Algeria	Tunis, Tunisie

18 October 1985	Algeria	3–0	Tunisia	Alger, Algérie

7 December 1985 Friendlies	Mexico	2–0	Algeria	Mexico, Mexico

11 December 1985 Friendlies	Algeria	1–3	Hungary	Monterrey, Mexico

13 December 1985 Friendlies	Algeria	0–2	South Korea	Nezahualcóyotl, Mexico

== 1986 ==
1986 Friendlies	Saudi Arabia	0–0	Algeria

1986	Saudi Arabia	1–1	Algeria

1986 Friendlies	Algeria	4–1	Mozambique

1986	Algeria	1–1	Morocco

20 August 1986 1986 Independence Cup Final	Indonesia	0–1 (a.e.t.)	Algeria	Jakarta, Indonesia
		Report	Bouiche 93'	Stadium: Senayan Stadium
