= 1986 African Cup of Nations final =

Football match held in Egypt

- Event: 1986 African Cup of Nations
| Egypt | Cameroon |
| (Egypt) | (Cameroon) |
| 0 | 0 |
- After extra time Egypt won 5–4 on penalties
- Date: 21 March 1986
- Venue: Cairo International Stadium, Cairo
- Referee: Ali Bennaceur (Tunisia)
- Attendance: 95,000

The 1986 African Cup of Nations final was a football match that took place on 21 March 1986 at the Cairo Stadium in Cairo, Egypt, to determine the winner of the 1986 African Cup of Nations, the football championship of Africa organized by the Confederation of African Football (CAF).

Egypt won the title for the third time by beating Cameroon 5–4 on penalties with the game ending 0–0.

== Road to the final ==
| Egypt | | Cameroon | |
| Opponents | Results | Opponents | Results |
Group stage
| Senegal | 0–1 | Zambia | 3–2 |
| Ivory Coast | 2–0 | Morocco | 1–1 |
| Mozambique | 2–0 | Algeria | 3–2 |
Semi-finals
| Morocco | 1–0 | Ivory Coast | 1–0 |

== Match details ==
=== Details ===
21 March 1986

| Egypt | 0–0 (a.e.t.) | Cameroon |
|---|---|---|
| | Report |
Penalties
| Yehia (penalty scored); Abdelghani (penalty scored); Abdou (penalty missed); Mayhoub (penalty scored); Shehata (penalty scored); Kasem (penalty scored) | 5–4 | (penalty scored) M'Fédé; (penalty scored) Kundé; (penalty missed) M'Bida; (penalty scored) Milla; (penalty scored) Aoudou; (penalty missed) Kana-Biyik |

Cairo International Stadium, Cairo
Attendance: 95,000
Referee: Ali Bennaceur (Tunisia)

| Egypt | Cameroon |

| GK | 1 | Thabet El-Batal |
| RB | 2 | Ali Shehata |
| CB | 5 | Mohamed Omar | | (substituted off) 58' |
| CB | 21 | Hamada Sedki |
| LB | 3 | Rabie Yassin |
| CM | 8 | Magdi Abdelghani | (yellow card) 93' |
| SW | 6 | Ashraf Kasem |
| CM | 12 | Tahar Abouzid | | (substituted off) 111' |
| RW | 7 | Mostafa Abdou (c) |
| CF | 10 | Mahmoud El Khatib |
| LW | 14 | Gamal Abdel Hamid |
Substitutions:
| CM | 4 | Alaa Mayhoub | | (substituted on) 58' |
| LW | 11 | Tarek Yehia | | (substituted on) 111' |
Manager:
(England) Mike Smith

| GK | 1 | Thomas N'Kono |
| RB | 5 | Victor N'Dip | (yellow card) 50' |
| CB | 4 | Ibrahim Aoudou |
| CB | 6 | Emmanuel Kundé (c) |
| LB | 3 | Isaac Sinkot |
| RM | 2 | André Kana-Biyik | (yellow card) 63' |
| CM | 8 | Emile M'Bouh | (yellow card) 82' |
| CM | 20 | Grégoire M'Bida |
| LM | 11 | Louis M'Fédé |
| CF | 13 | Ernest Ebongue | | (substituted off) 82' |
| CF | 9 | Roger Milla | (yellow card) 119' |
Substitutions:
| MF | 7 | Mamadou Oumarou | | (substituted on) 82' |
Manager:
(France) Claude Le Roy

Assistant referees:
Bester Kalombo (Malawi)
Jean-Fidèle Diramba (Gabon)
