= 1984 African Cup of Nations qualification =

Football tournament

This page details the qualifying process for the 1984 African Cup of Nations in Ivory Coast. Ivory Coast, as hosts, and Ghana, as title holders, qualified automatically.

== Qualifying tournament ==
Ghana qualified as holders
Ivory Coast qualified as hosts

=== Preliminary round ===
Team 1	Agg.	Team 2	1st leg	2nd leg
Malawi	4–0	Zimbabwe	2–0	2–0
Tanzania	3–4	Uganda	1–1	2–3
Somalia	0–1	Rwanda	0–1	n/p
Gabon	2–6	Angola	2–2	0–4
Mali	3–2	Gambia	3–1	0–1
Niger	0–1	Senegal	0–0	0–1
Togo	4–0	Sierra Leone	3–0	1–0
Benin	w/o	Liberia	—	—
Mauritius	w/o	Lesotho	—	—
Mozambique	w/o	Swaziland	—	—

12 September 1982

Malawi	2–0	Zimbabwe
Kaimfa 8'; Sinalo 88'

Lilongwe
3 October 1982

Zimbabwe	0–2	Malawi
		Dandize; Sinalo

Rufaro Stadium, Harare

Malawi won 4–0 on aggregate.

12 September 1982

Tanzania	1–1	Uganda

National Stadium, Dar es Salaam
26 September 1982

Uganda	3–2	Tanzania

Kampala

Uganda won 4–3 on aggregate.

19 September 1982

Somalia	0–1	Rwanda

Mogadishu Stadium, Mogadishu

Rwanda	n/p	Somalia

Kigali

Rwanda won 1–0 on aggregate.

13 October 1982

Gabon	2–2	Angola
Avah 20', 58'		Machado 4'; Sarmento 78'

Stade Omar Bongo, Libreville
14 November 1982

Angola	4–0	Gabon
Machado 45'; Maluka 55'; Vata 80'; Chico Dinis 88'

Estádio da Cidadela, Luanda

Angola won 6–2 on aggregate.

14 November 1982

Mali	3–1	Gambia
D.Konaté 22'; I. Traoré 42'; Koumaré 65'		Biri Biri

Stade Municipal, Bamako
28 November 1982

Gambia	1–0	Mali
Biri Biri 90'

Box Bar Stadium, Banjul

Mali won 3–2 on aggregate.

14 November 1982

Niger	0–0	Senegal

Niamey
28 November 1982

Senegal	1–0	Niger
M.Keita 69'

Stade Demba Diop, Dakar

Senegal won 1–0 on aggregate.

14 November 1982

Togo	3–0	Sierra Leone
Moutairou 61' (pen.), 75' (pen.), 90'

Lomé
28 November 1982

Sierra Leone	0–1	Togo

Freetown

Togo won 4–0 on aggregate.

Benin	Cancelled	Liberia
		Withdrew

Benin advanced after Liberia withdrew.

Mauritius	Cancelled	Lesotho
		Withdrew

Mauritius advanced after Lesotho withdrew.

Mozambique	Cancelled	Swaziland
		Withdrew

Mozambique advanced after Swaziland withdrew.

=== First round ===
Team 1	Agg.	Team 2	1st leg	2nd leg
Mozambique	3–4	Cameroon	3–0	0–4
Algeria	7–3	Benin	6–2	1–1
Libya	2–2 (a)	Senegal	2–1	0–1
Nigeria	2–1	Angola	2–0	0–1
Tunisia	6–0	Rwanda	5–0	1–0
Guinea	0–3	Togo	0–1	0–2
Morocco	4–2	Mali	4–0	0–2
Sudan	2–1	Zambia	2–1	0–0
Congo	2–2 (1–3 p)	Egypt	2–0	0–2
Ethiopia	1–1 (4–2 p)	Mauritius	1–0	0–1
Madagascar	2–2 (a)	Uganda	1–0	1–2
Malawi	w/o	Zaire	—	—

3 April 1983

Mozambique	3–0	Cameroon
Guiamba

Estádio da Machava, Maputo
24 April 1983

Cameroon	4–0	Mozambique
Abega; Djonkep; Ebongué

Ahmadou Ahidjo Stadium, Yaoundé

Cameroon won 4–3 on aggregate.

8 April 1983

Algeria	6–2	Benin
Bensaoula 2', 5'; Jefjef 10'; Madjer 13', 69'; Menad 46'		Korego 75'; Agouyou 88'

5 July Stadium, Algiers
Attendance: 28,671
Referee: Modibo N'Diaye (Mali)
26 April 1983

Benin	1–1	Algeria
Foly 28'		Madjer 50'

Stade de l'Amitié, Cotonou
Attendance: 10,000

Algeria won 7–3 on aggregate.

8 April 1983

Libya	2–1	Senegal
Al-Bor'osi; Al-Chouchan		Youm

Tripoli Stadium, Tripoli
24 April 1983

Senegal	1–0	Libya
Mendy 23'

Stade Demba Diop, Dakar

Senegal won by away goals rule after 2–2 on aggregate.

9 April 1983

Nigeria	2–0	Angola
Adeshina ?

Surulere Stadium, Lagos
24 April 1983

Angola	1–0	Nigeria
Ndunguidi 38'

Estádio da Cidadela, Luanda

Nigeria won 2–1 on aggregate.

10 April 1983

Tunisia	5–0	Rwanda
Dhiab 10'; Bayari 33', 86'; Hsoumi 83'; Gengwa 90' (o.g.)

Stade El Menzah, Tunis
24 April 1983

Rwanda	0–1	Tunisia
		Cheriti 58'

Kigali

Tunisia won 6–0 on aggregate.

10 April 1983

Guinea	0–1	Togo
		Moutairou 80' (pen.)

Stade du 28 Septembre, Conakry
24 April 1983

Togo	2–0	Guinea

Lomé

Togo won 3–0 on aggregate.

10 April 1983

Morocco	4–0	Mali
Krimau 10', 81'; Bouderbala 44', 64'

Stade Mohammed V, Casablanca
24 April 1983

Mali	2–0	Morocco

Stade Municipal, Bamako

Morocco won 4–2 on aggregate.

10 April 1983

Sudan	2–1	Zambia
Goal		Chola

Khartoum Stadium, Khartoum
24 April 1983

Zambia	0–0	Sudan

Lusaka

Sudan won 2–1 on aggregate.

10 April 1983

Congo	2–0	Egypt
Mbemba 40' (pen.); Makita 70'

Stade de la Révolution, Brazzaville
22 April 1983

Egypt	2–0	Congo
Youssef 75'; El Khatib 85' (pen.)
Penalties
	3–1

Cairo

Egypt won 3–1 on penalty shootout after 2–2 on aggregate.

10 April 1983

Ethiopia	1–0	Mauritius

Addis Ababa Stadium, Addis Ababa
24 April 1983

Mauritius	1–0	Ethiopia
Imbert 32'
Penalties
	2–4

Stade George V, Curepipe
Attendance: 45,000

Ethiopia won 4–2 on penalty shootout after 1–1 on aggregate.

10 April 1983

Madagascar	1–0	Uganda

Mahamasina Municipal Stadium, Antananarivo
24 April 1983

Uganda	2–1	Madagascar

Kampala

Madagascar won by away goals rule after 2–2 on aggregate.

Malawi	Cancelled	Zaire
		Withdrew

Malawi advanced after Zaire withdrew.

=== Second round ===
Team 1	Agg.	Team 2	1st leg	2nd leg
Ethiopia	2–4	Togo	2–1	0–3
Senegal	1–3	Algeria	1–1	0–2
Egypt	1–0	Tunisia	1–0	0–0
Nigeria	0–0 (4–3 p)	Morocco	0–0	0–0
Cameroon	5–2	Sudan	5–0	0–2
Madagascar	1–2	Malawi	0–1	1–1

3 July 1983

Ethiopia	2–1	Togo

Addis Ababa Stadium, Addis Ababa
28 August 1983

Togo	3–0	Ethiopia
Mawuli 17', 30'; Moutairou 60'

Lomé

Togo won 4–2 on aggregate.

13 August 1983

Senegal	1–1	Algeria
Tew 68'		Bensaoula 63'

Stade Demba Diop, Dakar
Attendance: 18 000
Referee: Ali Bin Nasser (Tunisia)
28 August 1983

Algeria	2–0	Senegal
Madjer 3'; Yahi 55'

Stade 5 Juillet 1962, Algiers
Attendance: 28 515

Algeria won 3–1 on aggregate.

14 August 1983

Egypt	1–0	Tunisia
Nabil 15'

Cairo
28 August 1983

Tunisia	0–0	Egypt

Stade El Menzah, Tunis

Egypt won 1–0 on aggregate.

14 August 1983

Nigeria	0–0	Morocco

Samuel Ogbemudia Stadium, Benin City
28 August 1983

Morocco	0–0	Nigeria
Penalties
	3–4

Prince Moulay Abdellah Stadium, Rabat

Nigeria won 4–3 on penalty shootout after 0–0 on aggregate.

14 August 1983

Cameroon	5–0	Sudan
Djonkep; Ebongué; Bahoken

Ahmadou Ahidjo Stadium, Yaoundé
28 August 1983

Sudan	2–0	Cameroon
S. El-Din; D'Ennaken

Khartoum Stadium, Khartoum

Cameroon won 5–2 on aggregate.

14 August 1983

Madagascar	0–1	Malawi
		Malola

Mahamasina Municipal Stadium, Antananarivo
28 August 1983

Malawi	1–1	Madagascar
Dandize		Goal

Kamuzu Stadium, Blantyre

Malawi won 2–1 on aggregate.

== Qualified teams ==
- Algeria
- Cameroon
- Egypt
- Ghana (holders)
- Ivory Coast (hosts)
- Malawi
- Nigeria
- Togo
