= Football at the 1987 All-Africa Games – Men's qualification =

The men's qualification for football tournament at the 1987 All-Africa Games.

== Qualification stage ==
=== Zone I (North Africa) ===
Libya and Morocco withdrew.

Algeria withdrew in protest of CAF's decision to order a replay of the first leg following Tunisia's protest that Algeria had fielded two professional players (Rabah Madjer and Chérif Oudjani).

CAF also rescinded an earlier decision to appoint Algeria as the replacement host of the 1988 African Cup of Nations finals (replacing original host Zambia), and awarded them to Morocco instead.

Tunisia qualified.

Team 1	Agg.	Team 2	1st leg	2nd leg
Tunisia	w/o	Algeria	0–2	—

11 January 1987

Tunisia	0–2	Algeria
		Belloumi 18'; Menad 87'

Stade El Menzah, Tunis
Referee: Mohamed Larache (Morocco)
21 February 1987

Algeria	Cancelled	Tunisia

5 July Stadium, Algiers

=== Zone II (West Africa 1) ===
First round

Team 1	Agg.	Team 2	1st leg	2nd leg
Guinea	w/o	(The Gambia) Gambia	—	—
Senegal	bye			

Second round

Team 1	Agg.	Team 2	1st leg	2nd leg
Senegal	–	(The Gambia) Gambia	–	–

Senegal	–	Gambia

Gambia	–	Senegal

Senegal qualified.

=== Zone III (West Africa 2) ===
First round

Team 1	Agg.	Team 2	1st leg	2nd leg
Ivory Coast	4–2	Liberia	2–1	2–1
Ghana	–	Benin	–	–
Togo	w/o	Burkina Faso	—	—
Nigeria	bye			

10 August 1986

Ivory Coast	2–1	Liberia
Amani; Bamba		Drapeau

24 August 1986

Liberia	1–2	Ivory Coast

Ivory Coast advanced to the second round.

Ghana	–	Benin

Benin	–	Ghana

Ghana advanced to the second round.

Second round

Team 1	Agg.	Team 2	1st leg	2nd leg
Nigeria	0–1	Ivory Coast	0–0	0–1
Ghana	4–1	Togo	3–0	1–1

3 January 1987

Nigeria	0–0	Ivory Coast

Surulere Stadium, Lagos
Referee: Hugues Joseph Mongbo (Benin)
18 January 1987

Ivory Coast	1–0	Nigeria
A. Traoré 47'

Felix Houphouet Boigny Stadium, Abidjan
Referee: Saidou Sowe (Gambia)

Ivory Coast advanced to the third round.

6 January 1987

Ghana	3–0	Togo
Abdul Aziz 78', 89'; Opoku Nti 84'

Accra Sports Stadium, Accra
18 January 1987

Togo	1–1	Ghana
Goal		Goal

Stade Général Eyadema, Lomé
Referee: Festus Okubule (Nigeria)

Ghana advanced to the third round.

Third round

Team 1	Agg.	Team 2	1st leg	2nd leg
Ghana	1–3	Ivory Coast	1–2	0–1

19 April 1987

Ghana	1–2	Ivory Coast
Iddi 26'		A. Traoré 31'; Miézan 39'

Accra Sports Stadium, Accra
Referee: Bakary Sarr (Senegal)
26 April 1987

Ivory Coast	1–0	Ghana
Ben Salah 75' (pen.)

Felix Houphouet Boigny Stadium, Abidjan
Referee: Idrissa Sarr (Mauritania)

Ivory Coast qualified.

=== Zone IV (Central Africa) ===
Qualifying tournament of Zone IV was combined with the 1987 Central African Games football tournament.

Cameroon qualified.

=== Zone V (East Africa) ===
Somalia withdrew.

First round

Team 1	Agg.	Team 2	1st leg	2nd leg
Egypt	w/o	Uganda	—	—
Tanzania	w/o	Ethiopia	—	—

Second round

Team 1	Agg.	Team 2	1st leg	2nd leg
Tanzania	2–10	Egypt	2–4	0–6

4 April 1987

Tanzania	2–4	Egypt
Zahoro Salum 89' (pen.); Abubakar Salum 90'		Abdel-Hamid 1'; Younes 6' (pen.), 61'; El-Kass 43'

Tanzania National Stadium, Dar es Salaam
Referee: Mohamed Abdel-Salam Gasmalla (Sudan)
17 April 1987

Egypt	6–0	Tanzania
Abdel-Hamid 17', 55'; Abdelghani 40'; Soliman 43' (pen.), 62'; Younes 52'

Cairo Military Academy Stadium, Cairo
Attendance: 6 000
Referee: Neji Jouini (Tunisia)

Egypt qualified; In addition, Kenya qualified as hosts.

=== Zone VI (Southern Africa) ===
First round

Team 1	Agg.	Team 2	1st leg	2nd leg
Malawi	2–2 (4–2 p)	Zimbabwe	1–1	1–1
Mozambique	bye			
Swaziland (Eswatini)	bye			
Zambia	bye			

19 July 1986

Malawi	1–1	Zimbabwe
Amosi		Shambo

Civo Stadium, Lilongwe
Attendance: 15,000
Referee: Eganaden Cadressen (Mauritius)
3 August 1986

Zimbabwe	1–1	Malawi
Tauro		Banda
Penalties
	2–4

Barbourfields Stadium, Bulawayo

Malawi advanced to the second round.

Second round

Team 1	Agg.	Team 2	1st leg	2nd leg
Swaziland (Eswatini)	2–9	Malawi	1–3	1–6
Zambia	w/o	Mozambique	—	—

4 January 1987

Swaziland	1–3	Malawi
Dube		K. Malunga; Waya; Banda

Attendance: Somhlolo National Stadium, Lobamba
Referee: Godfrey Kandawasvika (Zimbabwe)
18 January 1987

Malawi	6–1	Swaziland
Kayira 18'; Banda 21'; Waya 61', 68'; Msiya 75'; Chimodzi 90'		Dube 60'

Civo Stadium, Lilongwe
Referee: Joel Mondoka (Zambia)

Malawi advanced to the third round.

Third round

Team 1	Agg.	Team 2	1st leg	2nd leg
Zambia	3–3 (a)	Malawi	3–1	0–2

5 April 1987

Zambia	3–1	Malawi
K. Bwalya (pen.); Nyirenda		Sinalo

7 April Stadium, Lusaka
Referee: Ali Taher Hafidhi (Tanzania)
19 April 1987

Malawi	2–0	Zambia
Sinalo 29'; H. Malunga 77'

Kamuzu Stadium, Blantyre
Attendance: 40,000
Referee: Edwin Picon-Ackong (Mauritius)

Malawi qualified.

=== Zone VII (Indian Ocean) ===
First round

Team 1	Agg.	Team 2	1st leg	2nd leg
Djibouti	w/o	Madagascar	1–7	—
Seychelles	1–4	Mauritius	1–2	0–2

9 August 1986

Djibouti	1–7	Madagascar

24 August 1986

Madagascar	canceled	Djibouti

Madagascar advanced to the second round.

31 August 1986

Seychelles	1–2	Mauritius
Monnaie		Changou; Jackson

People's Stadium, Victoria
Referee: ... Razafa
14 September 1986

Mauritius	2–0	Seychelles

Stade George V, Curepipe

Mauritius advanced to the second round.

Second round

Team 1	Agg.	Team 2	1st leg	2nd leg
Madagascar	3–3 (4–2 p)	Mauritius	2–1	1–2

5 April 1987

Madagascar	2–1	Mauritius
Dindindraina 31' (pen.); Charbon 48'		Jacquotte 62'

Mahamasina Municipal Stadium, Antananarivo
Referee: Protas Walusala (Kenya)
19 April 1987

Mauritius	2–1	Madagascar
Jacquotte 12'; Mocudé 49'		Rafanodina 38'
Penalties
	2–4

Stade George V, Curepipe
Referee: Bakari Bendera (Tanzania)

Madagascar qualified.

== Qualifying teams ==
The following countries have qualified for the final tournament:

Zone	Team
Hosts	Kenya
Zone I	Tunisia
Zone II	Senegal
Zone III	Ivory Coast
Zone IV	Cameroon
Zone V	Egypt
Zone VI	Malawi
Zone VII	Madagascar
