= Nigeria national football team records and statistics =

The following is a list of the Nigeria national football team's competitive records and statistics.

== Individual records ==
=== Player records ===
As of 17 November 2026
Players in bold are still active with Nigeria.

==== Most appearances ====
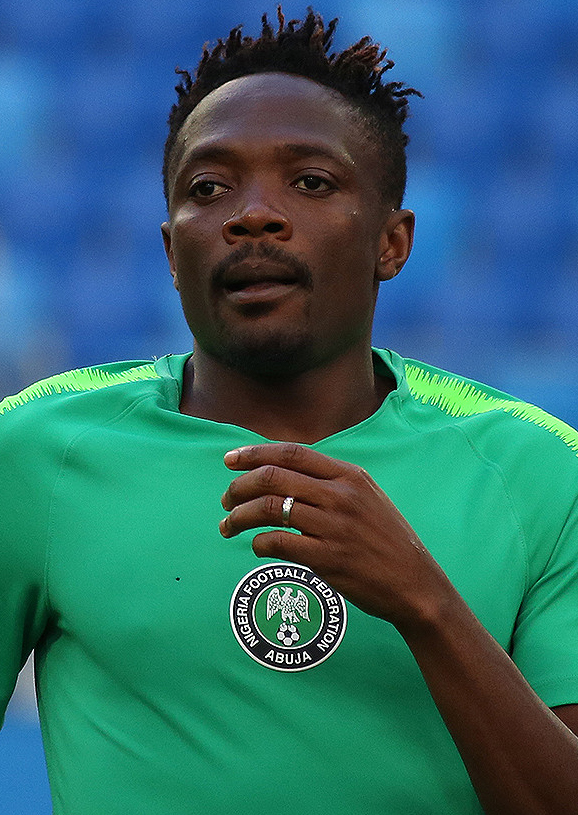
Ahmed Musa is Nigeria's most capped player.

Rank	Player	Caps	Goals	Career
1	Ahmed Musa (Note: Musa also appeared in one match against Togo in 2017, scoring two goals, however Nigeria made nine substitutions during this match, and therefore it is not recognised as an official match by FIFA.)	110	16	2010–2025
2	**Moses Simon**	104	12	2015–present
3	**Alex Iwobi** (Note: Also appeared in one match against Togo in 2017, however Nigeria made nine substitutions during this match, and therefore it is not recognised as an official match by FIFA.)	103	10	2015–present
4	Vincent Enyeama	101	0	2002–2015
4	Joseph Yobo	101	7	2001–2014
6	Mikel John Obi	91	6	2005–2019
7	Nwankwo Kanu	86	12	1994–2011
7	Mudashiru Lawal	86	11	1975–1985
9	**Wilfred Ndidi**	83	1	2015–present
10	William Troost-Ekong	82	8	2015–2025

==== Top goalscorers ====
Rank	Player	Goals	Caps	Ratio	Career
1	Rashidi Yekini	37	62	0.6	1983–1998
2	**Victor Osimhen**	35	51	0.69	2017–present
3	Segun Odegbami	22	47	0.47	1976–1981
4	Yakubu Aiyegbeni	21	58	0.36	2000–2012
5	Ikechukwu Uche	19	46	0.41	2007–2014
6	Obafemi Martins	18	42	0.43	2004–2015
7	Samson Siasia	17	49	0.35	1984–1998
8	Odion Ighalo	16	37	0.43	2015–2022
8	Ahmed Musa	16	110	0.15	2010–2025
10	**Kelechi Iheanacho** (Note: Iheanacho also appeared in one match against Togo in 2017, scoring one goal, however Nigeria made nine substitutions during this match, and therefore it is not recognised as an official match by FIFA.)	15	59	0.25	2015–present

== Competition records ==
=== FIFA World Cup ===
FIFA World Cup record
Year	Round	Position	Pld	W	D	L	GF	GA
(Uruguay) 1930	Did not enter							
(Italy) 1934	Did not enter							
(France) 1938	Did not enter							
(Brazil) 1950	Did not enter							
(Switzerland) 1954	Did not enter							
(Sweden) 1958	Did not enter							
(Chile) 1962	Did not qualify							
(England) 1966	Withdrew (Note: All African nations withdrew due to a lack of qualifying berths.)							
(Mexico) 1970	Did not qualify							
(Germany) 1974	Did not qualify							
(Argentina) 1978	Did not qualify							
(Spain) 1982	Did not qualify							
(Mexico) 1986	Did not qualify							
(Italy) 1990	Did not qualify							
(United States) 1994	Round of 16	9th	4	2	0	2	7	4
(France) 1998	Round of 16	12th	4	2	0	2	6	9
(South Korea) (Japan) 2002	Group stage	27th	3	0	1	2	1	3
(Germany) 2006	Did not qualify							
(South Africa) 2010	Group stage	27th	3	0	1	2	3	5
(Brazil) 2014	Round of 16	16th	4	1	1	2	3	5
(Russia) 2018	Group stage	21st	3	1	0	2	3	4
(Qatar) 2022	Did not qualify							
(Canada) (Mexico) (United States) 2026	Did not qualify							
(Morocco) (Portugal) (Spain) 2030	To be determined							
Total	Round of 16	6/22	21	6	3	12	23	30

=== African Cup of Nations ===
Africa Cup of Nations record
Year	Round	Position	Pld	W	D*	L	GF	GA
(Sudan) 1957	Not affiliated to CAF							
(United Arab Republic) 1959	Not affiliated to CAF							
(Ethiopia) 1962	Withdrew							
(Ghana) 1963	Group stage	6th	2	0	0	2	3	10
(Tunisia) 1965	Withdrew							
(Ethiopia) 1968	Did not qualify							
(Sudan) 1970	Withdrew							
(Cameroon) 1972	Did not qualify							
(Egypt) 1974	Did not qualify							
(Ethiopia) 1976	Third place	3rd	6	3	1	2	11	10
(Ghana) 1978	Third place	3rd	5	2	2	1	8	5
(Nigeria) 1980	Champions	1st	5	4	1	0	8	1
(Libya) 1982	Group stage	6th	3	1	0	2	4	5
(Ivory Coast) 1984	Runners-up	2nd	5	1	3	1	7	8
(Egypt) 1986	Did not qualify							
(Morocco) 1988	Runners-up	2nd	5	1	3	1	5	3
(Algeria) 1990	Runners-up	2nd	5	3	0	2	5	6
(Senegal) 1992	Third place	3rd	5	4	0	1	8	5
(Tunisia) 1994	Champions	1st	5	3	2	0	9	3
(South Africa) 1996	Withdrew							
(Burkina Faso) 1998	Banned							
(Ghana) (Nigeria) 2000	Runners-up	2nd	6	4	2	0	12	5
(Mali) 2002	Third place	3rd	6	3	2	1	4	2
(Tunisia) 2004	Third place	3rd	6	4	1	1	11	5
(Egypt) 2006	Third place	3rd	6	4	1	1	7	3
(Ghana) 2008	Quarter-finals	7th	4	1	1	2	3	3
(Angola) 2010	Third place	3rd	6	3	1	2	6	4
(Gabon) (Equatorial Guinea) 2012	Did not qualify							
(South Africa) 2013	Champions	1st	6	4	2	0	11	4
(Equatorial Guinea) 2015	Did not qualify							
(Gabon) 2017	Did not qualify							
(Egypt) 2019	Third place	3rd	7	5	0	2	9	7
(Cameroon) 2021	Round of 16	9th	4	3	0	1	6	2
(Ivory Coast) 2023	Runners-up	2nd	7	4	2	1	8	4
(Morocco) 2025	To be determined							
(Kenya) (Tanzania) (Uganda) 2027	To be determined							
Total	3 Titles	20/34	104	57	24	23	146	95

*Denotes draws including knockout matches decided via a penalty shoot-out.
**Red border colour indicates tournament was held on home soil.

=== African Nations Championship ===
African Nations Championship record
Year	Round	Position	Pld	W	D*	L	GF	GA
(Ivory Coast) 2009	Did not qualify							
(Sudan) 2011	Did not qualify							
(South Africa) 2014	Third place	3rd	6	3	2	1	12	8
(Rwanda) 2016	Group stage	10th	3	1	1	1	5	3
(Morocco) 2018	Runners-up	2nd	6	4	1	1	7	6
(Cameroon) 2020	Did not qualify							
(Algeria) 2022	Did not qualify							
Total	Runners-up	3/7	15	8	4	3	24	17

=== WAFU Nations Cup ===
WAFU Nations Cup record
Year	Round	Position	Pld	W	D	L	GF	GA
(Nigeria) 2010	Champions	1st	5	5	0	0	14	
(Nigeria) 2011	Runners-up	2nd	4	1	0	0	9	
(Ghana) 2013	Did not enter							
(Ghana) 2017	Runners-up	2nd	4	1	0	0	9	
(Senegal) 2019	Quarter-finals							
Total	1 Title	4/5	13	7	0	0	32	9

=== FIFA Confederations Cup ===
FIFA Confederations Cup record
Year	Round	Position	Pld	W	D*	L	GF	GA	Squad
(Saudi Arabia) 1992	Did not qualify								
(Saudi Arabia) 1995	Fourth place	4th	3	1	2	0	4	1	Squad
(Saudi Arabia) 1997	Did not qualify								
(Mexico) 1999	Did not qualify								
(South Korea) (Japan) 2001	Did not qualify								
(France) 2003	Did not qualify								
(Germany) 2005	Did not qualify								
(South Africa) 2009	Did not qualify								
(Brazil) 2013	Group stage	5th	3	1	0	2	7	6	Squad
(Russia) 2017	Did not qualify								
Total	Fourth place	2/10	6	2	2	2	11	7	-

=== Olympic Games ===
Olympic Games record
Appearances: 3
Year	Round	Position	Pld	W	D	L	GF	GA
1900–1948	Part of Great Britain							
(Finland) 1952	Did not enter							
(Australia) 1956	Did not enter							
(Italy) 1960	Did not qualify							
(Japan) 1964	Did not qualify							
(Mexico) 1968	Group stage	14th	3	0	1	2	4	9
(Germany) 1972	Did not qualify							
(Canada) 1976	Withdrew after qualifying							
(Soviet Union) 1980	Group stage	13th	3	0	1	2	2	5
(United States) 1984	Did not qualify							
(South Korea) 1988	Group stage	15th	3	0	0	3	1	8
(Spain) 1992	Banned							
Since 1992	See Nigeria national under-23 football team							
Total	Group stage	3/19	9	0	2	7	7	22

=== African Games ===
African Games record
Year	Result	Pld	W	D	L	GF	GA
(Republic of the Congo) 1965	Did not qualify						
(Nigeria) 1973	Gold Medal	5	4	1	0	14	7
(Algeria) 1978	Silver Medal	5	2	2	1	4	2
(Kenya) 1987	Did not qualify						
1991–present	See Nigeria national under-23 football team						
Total	Gold Medal	0	0	0	0	0	0

Football at the African Games has been an under-23 tournament since 1991.

== Head-to-head record ==
The following table summarizes the all-time record for the Nigeria. Nigeria has played matches against 92 current and former national teams, with the latest result, a drew against Russia on 6 October 2026.

Opponent	Pld	W	D	L	GF	GA	GD	Win %
Algeria	23	9	4	10	31	29	+2	39.13%
Angola	12	4	6	2	11	8	+3	33.33%
Argentina	9	2	1	6	13	15	–2	22.22%
Australia	1	0	0	1	0	1	–1	0%
Austria	1	0	1	0	1	1	0	0%
Benin	26	21	3	2	68	13	+55	80.76%
Bosnia and Herzegovina	1	1	0	0	1	0	+1	100%
Botswana	1	0	1	0	0	0	0	0%
Brazil	2	0	1	1	1	4	–3	0%
Bulgaria	2	2	0	0	4	0	+4	100%
Burkina Faso (Note: Includes matches against Upper Volta.)	17	10	6	1	34	10	+24	58.82%
Burundi	2	2	0	0	3	0	+3	100%
Cameroon	26	13	9	4	39	20	+19	50.00%
Canada	1	0	0	1	1	3	–2	0%
Cape Verde	3	1	2	0	3	2	+1	33.33%
Catalonia	1	0	0	1	0	5	–5	0%
Colombia	4	0	1	3	1	4	–3	0%
Congo	13	7	7	3	16	10	+6	53.84%
DR Congo	11	5	1	5	10	17	–7	45.45%
Costa Rica	1	0	1	0	0	0	0	0%
Croatia	1	0	0	1	0	2	–2	0%
Czech Republic	2	0	0	2	1	3	–2	0%
Denmark	1	0	0	1	1	4	–3	0%
Djibouti	2	0	2	0	0	0	0	0%
Ecuador	1	0	0	1	0	1	–1	0%
Egypt	21	8	6	7	30	27	+3	38.09%
England	3	0	1	2	1	3	–2	0%
Equatorial Guinea	4	3	1	0	7	2	+5	75.00%
Eritrea	2	1	1	0	4	0	+4	50.00%
Eswatini	2	1	1	0	2	0	+2	50.005%
Ethiopia	10	8	1	1	24	5	+19	80.00%
France	2	1	0	1	1	2	–1	50.00%
Gabon	10	6	3	1	20	7	+13	60.00%
Gambia	1	1	0	0	1	0	+1	100%
Georgia	1	1	0	0	5	1	+4	100%
Germany (Note: Includes matches against West Germany.)	3	0	0	3	1	3	–2	0%
Ghana	57	14	21	22	56	81	–25	24.56%
Greece	4	1	1	2	3	4	–1	25.00%
Guinea	19	6	7	6	22	19	+3	31.57%
Guinea-Bissau	5	3	0	2	4	4	0	60.00%
Iceland	2	1	0	1	2	3	–1	50.00%
Indonesia	1	1	0	0	2	1	+1	100%
Iran	3	2	1	0	3	1	+2	66.67%
Italy	3	0	1	2	3	5	–2	50.00%
Ivory Coast	29	8	11	10	33	29	+4	27.58%
Jamaica	8	3	4	1	12	7	+5	37.50%
Japan	2	1	0	1	3	3	0	50.00%
Jordan	2	0	1	1	2	3	–1	0%
Kenya	14	12	2	0	33	7	+26	85.71%
North Korea	1	1	0	0	3	1	+2	100%
South Korea	5	0	2	3	6	9	–3	0%
Lesotho	6	5	1	0	13	4	+9	83.33%
Liberia	16	11	2	3	30	12	+18	68.75%
Libya	7	6	0	1	14	4	+8	85.71%
Luxembourg	1	1	0	0	3	1	+2	100%
Madagascar	5	4	1	1	7	3	+4	75.00%
Malawi	8	6	2	0	20	9	+11	75.00%
Mali	12	6	3	3	17	12	+5	50.00%
Mexico	7	0	4	3	7	13	–6	0%
Morocco	12	3	3	6	8	14	–6	25.00%
Mozambique	6	5	1	0	12	2	+10	83.33%
Namibia	4	3	1	0	8	1	+7	75.00%
Netherlands	1	0	0	1	1	5	–4	0%
Niger	6	5	1	0	15	2	+13	83.33%
North Macedonia	1	0	1	0	0	0	0	0%
Norway	1	0	1	0	2	2	0	0%
Oman	1	0	0	1	1	2	–1	0%
Paraguay	2	1	1	0	2	4	–2	0%
Peru	1	0	0	1	0	1	–1	0%
Poland	2	1	1	0	3	2	+1	50.00%
Portugal	1	0	0	1	1	2	–1	0%
Republic of Ireland	3	2	1	0	6	2	+4	66.67%
Romania	2	0	0	2	0	5	–5	0%
Russia	5	0	2	3	4	9	–5	0%
Rwanda	9	4	4	1	9	3	+6	44.44%
São Tomé and Príncipe	2	2	0	0	16	0	+16	100%
Saudi Arabia	2	0	2	0	2	2	0	0%
Scotland	2	1	1	0	4	3	+1	50.00%
Senegal	20	8	6	6	21	21	0	40.00%
Serbia (Note: Includes matches against Yugoslavia.)	2	0	0	2	0	5	–5	0%
Seychelles	2	2	0	0	6	1	+5	100%
Sierra Leone	18	11	5	2	38	18	+20	61.11%
South Africa	17	7	8	2	25	12	+13	41.17%
Spain	2	1	0	1	3	5	–2	50.00%
Sudan	16	9	4	3	29	18	+11	56.25%
Sweden	2	0	0	2	2	5	–3	0%
Switzerland	1	1	0	0	1	0	+1	100%
Syria	1	1	0	0	1	0	+1	100%
Tahiti	1	1	0	0	6	1	+5	100%
Tanzania	9	6	3	0	13	4	+9	66.67%
Thailand	2	0	2	0	0	0	0	0%
Togo	19	8	7	4	34	25	+9	42.10%
Tunisia	22	6	10	6	23	28	–5	27.27%
Uganda	9	3	2	4	8	7	+1	33.33%
Ukraine	1	0	1	0	2	2	0	0%
Uruguay	1	0	0	1	1	2	–1	0%
United States	2	0	0	2	3	5	–2	0%
Uzbekistan	2	2	0	0	4	2	+2	100%
Venezuela	3	3	0	0	7	2	+5	100%
Yemen	1	1	0	0	2	0	+2	100%
Zambia	18	7	6	5	16	20	–4	38.89%
Zimbabwe	10	5	4	1	18	6	+12	50.00%
Total	682	341	202	139	1,287	686	+601	50.00%
