= Guédé (surname) =

Guédé is a surname. Notable people with the surname include:

- Ignace Guédé-Gba (1964–2021), Ivorian footballer
- Karim Guédé (born 1985), Slovak footballer
- Rudy Guédé (born 1986), Ivorian murderer

== See also ==
- Joseph Guédé Gnadou (born 1989), Ivorian footballer
