= Miézan =

Miézan is both a given name and a surname. Notable people with the name include:

- Miezan Edoukou (born 1967), Ivorian sprint canoer
- Pascal Miézan (1959–2006), Ivorian footballer
