= Thomas N'Kono =

Cameroonian footballer

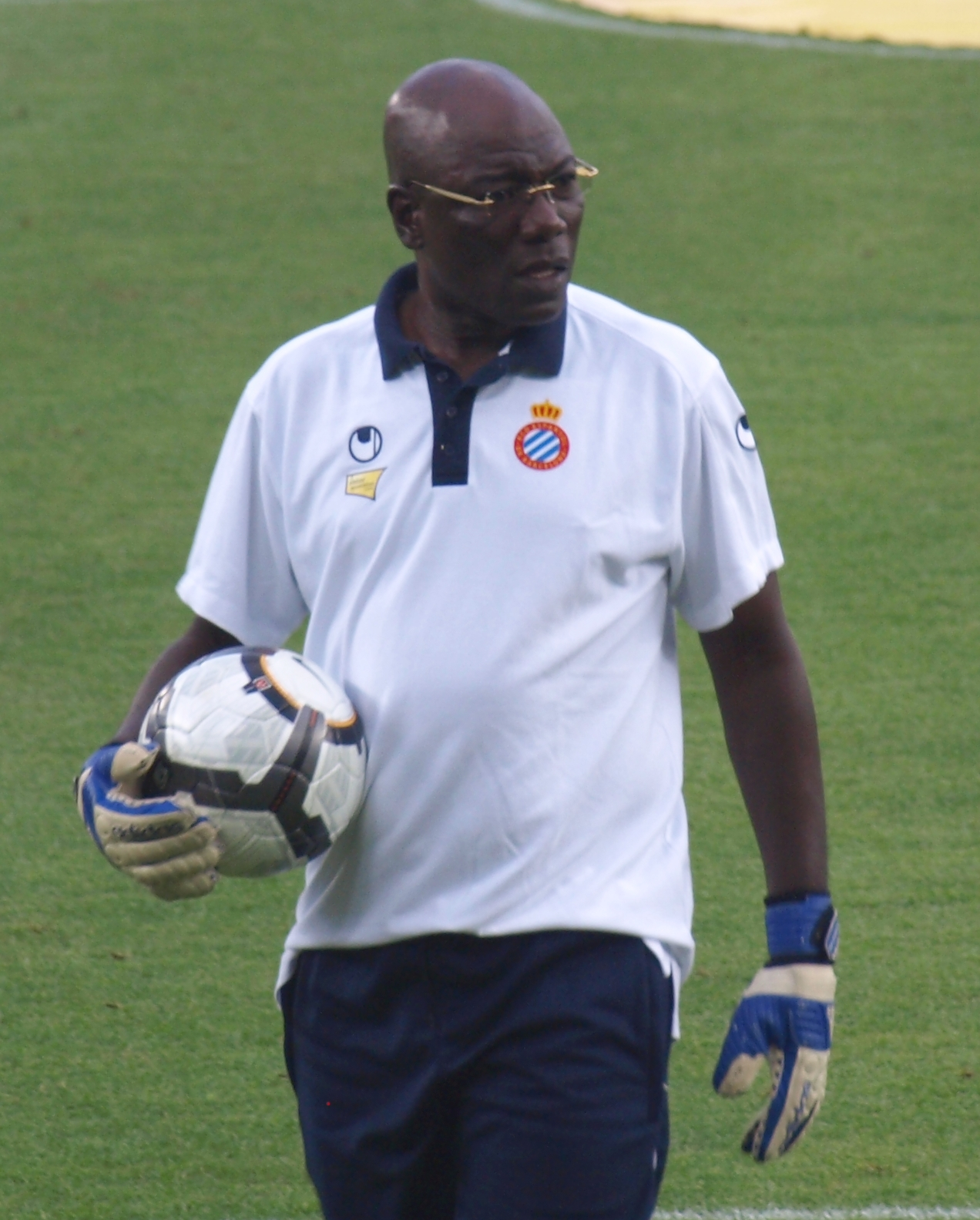
- N'Kono training with Espanyol (GK coach)

Personal information
- Date of birth: 20 July 1956 (age 70)
- Place of birth: Dizangue, Cameroon
- Height: 1.83 m (6 ft 0 in)
- Position: Goalkeeper

Youth career
- 1971–1974: Éclair Douala

Senior career*
Years	Team	Apps	(Gls)
1974–1975	Canon Yaoundé	3	(0)
1975–1976	Tonnerre Yaoundé	17	(0)
1976–1982	Canon Yaoundé	102	(0)
1982–1990	Español	272	(0)
1991–1993	Sabadell	70	(0)
1994	Hospitalet	0	(0)
1994–1997	Club Bolívar	92	(0)
Total		556	(0)

International career
1975–1994	Cameroon	63	(0)

Managerial career
- 2009: Cameroon
Medal record
Men's football
Representing Cameroon
Africa Cup of Nations
Winner	1984 Ivory Coast
Runner-up	1986 Egypt
- * Club domestic league appearances and goals

Thomas "Tommy" N'Kono (born 20 July 1956) is a Cameroonian former professional footballer. One of the greatest goalkeepers from the continent of Africa, he was mainly associated with Espanyol, whom he represented for almost a decade playing more than 300 official matches.

N'Kono appeared for the Cameroon national team in three World Cups, and four Africa Cup of Nations tournaments.

== Club career ==
N'Kono was born in Dizangue. After playing in his country with Canon Yaoundé and Tonnerre Yaoundé he moved to Spain with RCD Español in 1982, after solid performances in the FIFA World Cup played in that country; he received the France Football African Footballer of the Year award in that year, and also in 1979.

N'Kono hardly ever missed a game while with the Catalans, going on to make 333 competitive appearances. In the 1988–89 season, however, he was not able to help prevent the team's La Liga relegation, and was eventually replaced by Vicente Biurrun.

N'Kono played three more years in Spain, incidentally also in Catalonia, with CE Sabadell FC (Segunda División) and CE L'Hospitalet. He retired in his 40s at Club Bolívar from Bolivia, and subsequently returned to his main club as a goalkeeping coach, helping develop young talent and countryman Carlos Kameni.

N'Kono placed second in IFFHS' "African Goalkeeper of the Century" elections, behind Joseph-Antoine Bell.

== International career ==
A Cameroonian international for almost two decades, N'Kono was included in three FIFA World Cup squads: 1982, 1990 and 1994. In the first tournament, he was the starter as the nation went out in the group phase without any defeats, drawing all three matches and keeping clean sheets against Poland and Peru. In the second, Bell was initially set to start, but N'Kono later took his place in the starting line-up; following a 1–0 win over defending champions Argentina in the group-stage opener, the team's first ever in the tournament, he helped the team top their group, losing 3–2 to England in the quarter-finals after disposing of Colombia in the previous stage.

The 37-year-old N'Kono was called as backup to Bell in the last minute of the 1994 edition's preparations and did not play. He was also a member of the team that won the 1984 African Cup of Nations, starting in the first two group games but leaving early due to club commitments; his place was taken by Bell, who started in the 3–1 final victory against Nigeria. He started in the 1986 edition of the competition, where his side lost 5–4 on penalties to Egypt in the final following a 0–0 draw, despite him stopping Mustafa Abdou's attempt.

N'Knono regularly competed for a starting spot with his perceived rival Bell for many years.

== Coaching career ==
N'Kono served as assistant coach to the Cameroon national team, at the same time as being goalkeeping coach at former club Espanyol. In 2002, he was arrested by Malian police for allegedly using "black magic", prior to the African Cup of Nations semi-final against Mali (3–0 win). He was dragged onto the running track after stepping onto the pitch at the 26 March Stadium alongside coach Winfried Schäfer, and eventually received a one-year ban, which was then lifted, although he was not allowed to sit on the bench for the final; the former also received an apology from the office of the Malian president.

N'Kono, who was the national side's goalkeepers coach, also worked briefly as interim manager after German Otto Pfister resigned in protest. The following month, as Paul Le Guen took the reins of the team, he was reset in his old post.

== Player profile ==
=== Style of play and reception ===
Nicknamed the "black spider," N'Kono was considered to be one of the greatest African goalkeepers of all time. Strong and athletic, he was known in particular for his speed, agility, reactions, positioning and ability to produce acrobatic saves. One of his most notable characteristics was his ability to come out and punch the ball away with power when crosses were delivered into the area; his aggressive style inspired Gianluigi Buffon as a youngster.

In addition to his goalkeeping abilities, N'Kono was also known for his moustache and for wearing long trackpants instead of shorts; furthermore, he also had a penchant for performing flamboyant and acrobatic celebrations during matches. Unlike compatriot Bell, he preferred to position himself in deeper areas, rather than rushing out to sweep up the ball.

=== Legacy ===
Buffon declared that he decided to play in the goalkeeping position after seeing N'Kono's performances at the 1990 World Cup. In addition, he named his first son Louis Thomas in the Cameroonian's honour.

== Honours ==
Canon Yaoundé

- Elite One: 1974, 1977, 1979, 1980, 1982
- CAF Champions League: 1978, 1980

Espanyol

- UEFA Cup runner-up: 1987–88

Bolívar

- Liga de Fútbol Profesional Boliviano: 1996, 1997

Cameroon

- Africa Cup of Nations: 1984; runner-up: 1986

Individual

- African Player of the Year: 1979, 1982
- La Liga Team of The Year: 1982–83, 1985–86, 1988–89
- MasterCard African Team of the 20th Century: 1998
- International Federation of Football History & Statistics All-time Africa Men's Dream Team: 2021
