= Aoudou =

Aoudou is a surname. Notable people with the surname include:

- Ibrahim Aoudou (1955–2022), Cameroonian footballer
- Mohamed Aoudou (born 1989), Beninese footballer
