= Mohammed Sahil =

Moroccan footballer

Personal information
- Date of birth: 11 October 1963 (age 63)
- Place of birth: Morocco
- Height: 1.86 m (6 ft 1 in)
- Position: Midfielder

Senior career*
| Years | Team | Apps | (Gls) |
| 1982–1985 | WAC Casablanca | | |
| 1985–1986 | KAC Marrakech | | |
| 1986–1987 | WAC Casablanca | | |
| 1987–1988 | Louhans-Cuiseaux FC | | |
| 1993–1998 | Quarteirense | | |

International career
- Morocco
- * Club domestic league appearances and goals

Mohammed Sahil (Arabic: محمد سهيل; born 11 October 1963) is a Moroccan football midfielder who played for Morocco in the 1986 FIFA World Cup.

== Career ==
After finishing college, Sahil began playing senior football with WAC Casablanca during the 1982–83 Botola season. After three seasons with WAC, Sahil joined KAC Marrakech, but returned to WAC after one season with Marrakech. In 1987, Sahil signed his first professional contract, with France's Ligue 2 side Louhans-Cuiseaux FC. Later, he played professionally in the Portuguese Segunda Divisão B with C.D.R. Quarteirense.

Sahil made several appearances for the Morocco national football team. He helped the team qualify for the 1986 African Cup of Nations, and scored a headed goal in the third place match at the finals.
