= Luc Mbassi =

Cameroonian footballer (1957–2016)

Personal information
- Full name: Luc Mbassi Effengue
- Date of birth: 1957
- Date of death: 8 October 2016 (aged 58–59)
- Position: Defender

International career
Years	Team	Apps	(Gls)
- Cameroon
Medal record
Men's football
Representing Cameroon
Africa Cup of Nations
Winner	1984 Ivory Coast

Luc Mbassi Effengue (1957 – 8 October 2016) was a Cameroonian footballer. He competed in the men's tournament at the 1984 Summer Olympics.

== Honours ==
Cameroon

- African Cup of Nations: 1984
