= Mohamed Omar El-Zeer =

Egyptian footballer (born 1958)

Mohamed Omar
Personal information
- Full name: Mohamed Omar El-Zeer
- Date of birth: 3 September 1958 (age 68)
- Place of birth: Alexandria, Republic of Egypt
- Position: Defender

Youth career
- 1974–1977: Al Ittihad

Senior career*
Years	Team	Apps	(Gls)
1977–1989	Al Ittihad		
1989–1990	Al-Ahli		
1990–1992	Al Ittihad		

International career^{‡}
1980–1989	Egypt	58	(0)
Medal record
Men's football
Representing Egypt
Africa Cup of Nations
Winner	1986 Egypt
Africa Games
Winner	1987	Team
- * Club domestic league appearances and goals ‡ National team caps and goals as of 21 July 1989

Mohamed Omar El-Zeer (Arabic: محمد عمر الزير; born 3 September 1958) is an Egyptian retired professional footballer who played as a defender. He competed in the men's tournament at the 1984 Summer Olympics.

== Career statistics ==
=== International ===
As of match played 21 July 1989

National team	Year	Apps	Goals
Egypt
Egypt	1980	3	0
Egypt	1981	4	0
Egypt	1982	1	0
Egypt	1983	5	0
Egypt	1984	6	0
Egypt	1985	2	0
Egypt	1986	8	0
Egypt	1987	16	0
Egypt	1988	11	0
Egypt	1989	2	0
Total		58	0

== Honours ==
=== Egypt ===
- African Cup of Nations: 1986
- Africa Games: 1987
