= Denké Kossi Wazo =

Togolese footballer (1958–2014)

Wazo
Personal information
- Full name: Julien Kossi Denké
- Date of birth: 18 May 1958
- Place of birth: Lomé, Togo
- Date of death: 16 March 2014 (aged 55)
- Place of death: Limoges, France
- Height: 1.85 m (6 ft 1 in)
- Position: Defender

Senior career*
Years	Team	Apps	(Gls)
1978–1984	Aiglons de Lomé		
1984–1985	Châteauroux	25	(0)
1985–1986	Bourges		
1986–1987	Swiss club		
1987–1988	Decize		

International career
1980–1984	Togo	70	(?)
- * Club domestic league appearances and goals

Julien Kossi Denke (18 May 1958 – 16 March 2014), known as Wazo, was a Togo international football player.

== Club career ==
Born in Lomé, Denké began playing club football for local side Aiglons de Lomé. After participating in the African Cup of Nations finals in Côte d'Ivoire, Wazo attempted to join an Ivorian club, however he was caught and repatriated to Togo.

In June 1984, Denké became the first Togolese footballer to move to Europe when he joined French Ligue 2 club LB Châteauroux. The following season, he joined Ligue 2 rivals FC Bourges. He had a brief spell in Switzerland before finishing his career with Sud Nivernais Imphy Decize.

== International career ==
Denké made 70 appearances for the Togo national football team, including one FIFA World Cup qualifying match. He played for Togo at the 1984 African Cup of Nations finals.

After retiring from playing, Wazo became a technical adviser to the Togo national football team at the 1998 African Cup of Nations finals.

== Personal ==
Denké died in France at age 55.
