= Mamadou Tew =

Senegalese footballer (1959–2019)

- Tew while at Club Brugge in 1987

Personal information
- Date of birth: 27 November 1959
- Place of birth: Yarakh, Senegal
- Date of death: 31 August 2019 (aged 59)
- Place of death: Dakar, Senegal
- Position: Right back

Senior career*
Years	Team	Apps	(Gls)
- Casa Sport
1984–1990	Club Brugge	111	(5)
1990–1992	Charleroi	24	(0)
- Casa Sport
Total		135	(5)

International career
1984–1992	Senegal		
- * Club domestic league appearances and goals

Mamadou Tew (27 November 1959 – 31 August 2019) was a Senegalese footballer who played at both professional and international levels as a right back.

== Club career ==
Tew began his career in his native Senegal with Casa Sport, before moving to Belgian club Club Brugge in 1984. Tew spent six seasons at Brugge, making nearly 150 appearances in all competitions. Tew later played for Charleroi before ending his career at his first club Casa Sport.

== International career ==
Tew made one appearance for Senegal in July 1984.

Tew made 3 appearances at the 1986 African Cup of Nations finals in Egypt and at the 1990 African Cup of Nations finals in Algeria. He also appeared twice in the 1992 African Cup of Nations finals as Senegal hosted.

== Death ==
Tew died in Dakar, Senegal on 31 August 2019.
