= Djogou Akoulassi Tao =

Togolese footballer (died 2022)

Personal information
- Date of death: 9 November 2022
- Place of death: France
- Position: Defensive midfielder

Senior career*
Years	Team	Apps	(Gls)
1980–1982	Gomido		
1983–1984	OC Agaza		
1985–1988	LB Châteauroux		
1988–1991	AS Sarreguemines		

International career
1980–1990	Togo	~80	(1+)
- * Club domestic league appearances and goals

Djogou Akoulassi Tao (died 9 November 2022) was a Togolese footballer who played as a defensive midfielder.

== Career ==
Akoulassi Tao began his career in Togo with Gomido, before joining OC Agaza in 1983, where he helped them reach the 1983 African Cup Winners' Cup final, where they 1–0 on aggregate to Egyptian side El Mokawloon SC. In 1985, he, alongside international teammate Sadou Boukari, were spotted by French Division 3 side LB Châteauroux, who signed both of them. In 1988, he joined French Division 4 side AS Sarreguemines.

He reportedly played nearly 80 games for the Togo national team, including at the 1984 African Cup of Nations, where he played in all three matches as Togo finished last in their group.

Following his retirement, Akoulassi Tao began coaching various amateur clubs in France.

== Personal life and death ==
His son, William Djogou, is a footballer who played in the academies of LB Châteauroux and Chamois Niortais, before moving to Luxembourg.

Akoulassi Tao died in France on 9 November 2022, following a multi-year battle with cancer.
