= Jean-Claude Mbemba =

Congolese former footballer

Personal information
- Date of birth: 2 December 1963 (age 62)
- Place of birth: Republic of the Congo
- Position: Midfielder

Senior career*
Years	Team	Apps	(Gls)
- Műegyetemi AFC
1988-1996	Vasas SC	33+	(4+)
-2008/09	Péti MTE LC	27+	(16+)
2009/10-2010/11	Szabadkikötő SE	6	(1)

International career
1991-1992	Republic of the Congo	2	(1)
- * Club domestic league appearances and goals

Jean-Claude Mbemba (born 2 December 1963) is a retired international footballer from the Republic of the Congo. He became a pioneer African player in Hungarian football at a time when the People's Republic of the Congo and the Hungarian People's Republic were Communist allies.
