= Kennedy Malunga =

Malawian footballer

Personal information
- Full name: Kennedy Green Malunga
- Date of birth: 14 May 1970 (age 56)
- Place of birth: Malawi
- Position: Midfielder

Senior career*
Years	Team	Apps	(Gls)
–1985	?		
1985	Mamelodi Sundowns		
1986–1987	MTL Wanderers		
1987–1988	Cercle Brugge	1	(0)
1988–1989	Kortrijk		
1990	Dynamos	?	(3)
1991	PE Blackpool	?	(2)

International career
1987–1989	Malawi		
- * Club domestic league appearances and goals

Kennedy Malunga (born 14 May 1970) is a former Malawi international football midfielder who plays for clubs in Malawi, South Africa and Belgium.

== Club career ==
Born in Malawi, Malunga played football in the local league for MTL Wanderers. He joined South African side Mamelodi Sundowns F.C. with his brother, Holman, in August 1985.

He joined Belgian Pro League side Cercle Brugge K.S.V. for the 1987-88 season, but made only one competitive appearance for the club, while finishing sixth in the voting for 1987 African Player of the Year. He moved to K.V. Kortrijk the following season.

In 1990, Malunga returned to South Africa to play for Dynamos F.C. and Port Elizabeth Blackpool.

== International career ==
Malunga made several appearances for the Malawi national football team, including two FIFA World Cup qualifying matches. He won a bronze medal with Malawi at the 1987 All-Africa Games in Nairobi.
