= Jean-Désiré Sikely =

Ivorian footballer

Personal information
- Date of birth: 27 January 1951 (age 75)
- Place of birth: Grand-Lahou, Ivory Coast
- Height: 1.79 m (5 ft 10 in)
- Position: Forward

Youth career
- 1969–1972: 1er Canton
- 1972–1973: Marseille

Senior career*
Years	Team	Apps	(Gls)
1973–1975	Marseille	8	(4)
1975–1978	Toulon	87	(31)
1978–1979	Marseille	18	(1)
1979–1980	Martigues	26	(12)
1980–1982	Montpellier	41	(4)
1982–1985	Sète		
1985–1986	1er Canton		

International career
- Ivory Coast
- * Club domestic league appearances and goals

Jean-Désiré Sikely (born 27 January 1951) is an Ivorian former professional football forward who spent his career in France and represented the Ivory Coast national team internationally.
