= René N'Djeya =

Cameroonian footballer

Personal information
- Full name: René Brice N'Djeya
- Date of birth: October 9, 1953 (age 73)
- Place of birth: Yaoundé, Cameroon
- Height: 1.85 m (6 ft 1 in)
- Position: Defender

Senior career*
Years	Team	Apps	(Gls)
1973–1985	Union Douala		

International career
1979–1984	Cameroon	9	(0)
Medal record
Men's football
Representing Cameroon
Africa Cup of Nations
Winner	1984 Ivory Coast
- * Club domestic league appearances and goals

René Brice N'Djeya (born 9 October 1953 in Douala) is a retired Cameroonian professional footballer. He competed for the Cameroon national football team at the 1982 FIFA World Cup. He also played for Cameroon at the 1984 African Cup of Nations, where he scored a goal against Nigeria.

== Career ==
N'Djeya played club football in Cameroon for Union Douala.

After retiring from playing football, N'Djeya started working for the ministry of railroads.

== Honours ==
Cameroon

- African Cup of Nations: 1984
