= Bala Ali =

Nigerian footballer

Personal information
- Full name: Bala Ali
- Date of birth: 16 August 1968
- Place of birth: Nigeria
- Position: Winger

Senior career*
Years	Team	Apps	(Gls)
1991–1992	Panachaiki	16	(1)

International career
1981–1989	Nigeria	6	(2)
- * Club domestic league appearances and goals

Bala Ali (born 16 August 1968) was a footballer who played as a winger for clubs in Nigeria and Greece.

== Club career ==
In 1991, Ali joined Super League Greece side Panachaiki for one season appearing in 16 league matches for the club.

== International career ==
Ali made several appearances for the Nigeria national football team. He scored on his debut, a friendly against Upper Volta in 1981. He also played for Nigeria at the 1984 African Cup of Nations finals, helping the squad to a runners-up finish.

He played in a 1990 FIFA World Cup qualifying match against Angola. His teammate, Samuel Okwaraji died during the match.
