= Rafiou Moutairou =

Togolese footballer

Personal information
- Date of birth: 11 October 1960 (age 66)
- Place of birth: Lomé, Togo
- Position: Forward

Youth career
- 1960–1977: OC Agaza

Senior career*
Years	Team	Apps	(Gls)
1977–1998	OC Agaza	768	(451)

International career
- Togo
- * Club domestic league appearances and goals

Rafiou Moutairou (born 11 October 1960) is a Togolese retired footballer who played as a forward. He finished in third place in the 1983 African Footballer of the Year polling while playing for OC Agaza in Lomé. He is the half brother from Bachirou Salou. Moutairou played for the Togo national team at the 1984 African Cup of Nations.
