= Isaac Sinkot =

Cameroonian footballer (born 1954)

Personal information
- Date of birth: 11 July 1954 (age 72)

International career
Years	Team	Apps	(Gls)
- Cameroon
Medal record
Men's football
Representing Cameroon
Africa Cup of Nations
Winner	1984 Ivory Coast
Runner-up	1986 Egypt

Isaac Sinkot (born 11 July 1954) is a Cameroonian former footballer. He competed in the men's tournament at the 1984 Summer Olympics.

== Honours ==
Cameroon

- African Cup of Nations: 1984; runner-up, 1986
