= Humphrey Edobor =

Nigerian footballer (born 1966)

Personal information
- Date of birth: 12 March 1966 (age 60)
- Place of birth: Nigeria
- Position: Winger

Senior career*
Years	Team	Apps	(Gls)
1981–1985	Bendel Insurance	–	(–)
–	New Nigerian Bank	–	(–)
–	Leventis United	–	(–)

International career
1983	Nigeria U20	–	(–)
1983–1989	Nigeria	23	(7)
- * Club domestic league appearances and goals

Humphrey Edobor (born 12 March 1966) is a Nigerian former international footballer who played as a right-winger. He played professional club football in his home country and represented the Nigeria national football team in international tournaments. He took part in the 1983 FIFA World Youth Championship and with the senior team, in the 1984 and 1988 African Cup of Nations.
