= Mahmoud Hassan Saleh =

Egyptian footballer (born 1962)

Personal information
- Date of birth: 4 May 1962 (age 64)
- Position: Forward

Senior career*
Years	Team	Apps	(Gls)
- Ismaily

International career
- Egypt
- * Club domestic league appearances and goals

Mahmoud Hassan Saleh (born 4 May 1962) is an Egyptian footballer. He competed in the men's tournament at the 1984 Summer Olympics.
