= Grégoire M'Bida =

Cameroonian footballer

Personal information
- Full name: Grégoire M'Bida Abéga
- Date of birth: 27 January 1955 (age 71)
- Place of birth: Yaoundé, Cameroon
- Position: Attacking midfielder

Youth career
- –1974: Réal d’Éssé
- 1974–1975: Canon Yaoundé

Senior career*
Years	Team	Apps	(Gls)
1975–1982	Canon Yaoundé		
1982–1984	Bastia	49	(3)
1984–1985	Angers	31	(9)
1985–1986	Dunkerque	17	(1)
1986–1987	Thonon-les-Bains	12	(2)
1987–1989	Sedan Ardennes	35	(6)
1989–1990	Alliance Dudelange	5	(0)

International career
1976–1989	Cameroon	34	(7)
Medal record
Men's football
Representing Cameroon
Africa Cup of Nations
Winner	1984 Ivory Coast
Runner-up	1986 Egypt
- * Club domestic league appearances and goals

Grégoire M'Bida Abéga (born 27 January 1955), nicknamed Arantes, is a Cameroonian former professional footballer who played as an attacking midfielder. He competed for the Cameroon national team at the 1982 FIFA World Cup.

== Career ==
M'Bida was born in Yaoundé. He played for Canon Yaoundé (1975–1982), SC Bastia (1982–1984), Angers SCO (1984–1985), USL Dunkerque (1985–1986), Thonon-les-Bains (1986–1987) and CS Sedan Ardennes (1987–1989).

He played all minutes for Cameroon in the 1982 FIFA World Cup and also scored the only goal for Cameroon in the competition. The goal was scored 63 minutes into the match against Italy, only one minute after Francesco Graziani had scored for Italy. The game ended in a draw, 1–1.

== Honours ==
Cameroon

- African Cup of Nations: 1984; runner-up, 1986

== See also ==
- 1982 FIFA World Cup squads
