= Thierno Youm =

Senegalese footballer

Personal information
- Date of birth: 17 April 1960 (age 66)
- Place of birth: Rufisque, Senegal
- Position: Forward

Senior career*
| Years | Team | Apps | (Gls) |
| 1980–1984 | Diaraf | | |
| 1984–1987 | Laval | 73 | (15) |
| 1987–1992 | Nantes | 124 | (29) |
| 1992–1993 | Espérance | | |
| 1994–1995 | Olympique Avignon | | |

International career
| 1983–1992 | Senegal | ? | (?) |
- * Club domestic league appearances and goals

Thierno Youm (born 17 April 1960 in Rufisque, Senegal) is a former forward.
