= 1986 African Cup of Nations =

15th edition of the Africa Cup of Nations

1986 كأس الأمم الأفريقية

Tournament details
- Host country: Egypt
- Dates: 7–21 March
- Teams: 8
- Venues: 2 (in 2 host cities)

Final positions
- Champions: Egypt (3rd title)
- Runners-up: Cameroon
- Third place: Ivory Coast
- Fourth place: Morocco

Tournament statistics
- Matches played: 16
- Goals scored: 31 (1.94 per match)
- Top scorer: (Cameroon) Roger Milla (4 goals)
- Best player: (Cameroon) Roger Milla

The 1986 African Cup of Nations was the 15th edition of the African Cup of Nations, the football championship run by the Confederation of African Football (CAF). It was hosted by Egypt. Just like in 1984, the field of eight teams was split into two groups of four.

Hosts Egypt won a third championship, defeating Cameroon 5–4 on penalties in the final after a goalless draw.

== Qualified teams ==
The 8 qualified teams are:

Team	Qualified as	Qualified on	Previous appearances in tournament (Note: Bold indicates champion for that year, Italic indicates host.)
Egypt	Hosts		7 (1962, 1963, 1970, 1974, 1976, 1980, 1984)
Cameroon	Holders	18 March 1984	4 (1970, 1972, 1982, **1984**)
Algeria	2nd round winners	13 August 1985	4 (1968, 1980, 1982, 1984)
Zambia	2nd round winners	18 August 1985	3 (1974, 1978, 1982)
Ivory Coast	2nd round winners	1 September 1985	6 (1965, 1968, 1970, 1974, 1980, 1984)
Senegal	2nd round winners	1 September 1985	2 (1965, 1968)
Morocco	2nd round winners	8 September 1985	4 (1972, **1976**, 1978, 1980)
Mozambique	2nd round winners	15 September 1985	0 (debut)

== Venues ==
The competition was played in two venues in Cairo and Alexandria.

Cairo	1986 African Cup of Nations is located in Egypt
Cairo International Stadium	1986 African Cup of Nations is located in Egypt
Capacity: **90,000**	1986 African Cup of Nations is located in Egypt
Alexandria	1986 African Cup of Nations is located in Egypt
Alexandria Stadium	1986 African Cup of Nations is located in Egypt
Capacity: **15,000**	1986 African Cup of Nations is located in Egypt

== Group stage ==
=== Tiebreakers ===
If two or more teams finished level on points after completion of the group matches, the following tie-breakers were used to determine the final ranking:

1. Goal difference in all group matches
2. Greater number of goals scored in all group matches
3. Drawing of lots

=== Group A ===
Pos	Team	Pld	W	D	L	GF	GA	GD	Pts	Qualification
1	Egypt (H)	3	2	0	1	4	1	+3	**4**	Advance to Knockout stage
2	Ivory Coast	3	2	0	1	4	2	+2	**4**	Advance to Knockout stage
3	Senegal	3	2	0	1	3	1	+2	**4**	
4	Mozambique	3	0	0	3	0	7	−7	**0**	

Rules for classification: Group stage tiebreakers
(H) Hosts
7 March 1986

Senegal	1–0	Egypt
Youm 67'	Report

Cairo International Stadium, Cairo
Attendance: 45,000
Referee: Edwin Picon-Ackong (Mauritius)

7 March 1986

Ivory Coast	3–0	Mozambique
A. Traoré 25', 74'; N'Dri 86'	Report

Cairo International Stadium, Cairo
Attendance: 20,000
Referee: Gebreyesus Tesfaye (Ethiopia)

10 March 1986

Senegal	2–0	Mozambique
Fall 28'; Bocandé 83'	Report

Cairo International Stadium, Cairo
Attendance: 30,000
Referee: Festus Okubule (Nigeria)

10 March 1986

Egypt	2–0	Ivory Coast
Gharieb 73'; Abdelhamid 83'	Report

Cairo International Stadium, Cairo
Attendance: 50,000
Referee: Bester Kalombo (Malawi)

13 March 1986

Ivory Coast	1–0	Senegal
A. Traoré 71'	Report

Cairo International Stadium, Cairo
Attendance: 15,000
Referee: Jean-Fidele Diramba (Gabon)

13 March 1986

Egypt	2–0	Mozambique
Abouzaid 13', 15'	Report

Cairo International Stadium, Cairo
Attendance: 55,000
Referee: Ally Hafidhi (Tanzania)

=== Group B ===
Pos	Team	Pld	W	D	L	GF	GA	GD	Pts	Qualification
1	Cameroon	3	2	1	0	7	5	+2	**5**	Advance to Knockout stage
2	Morocco	3	1	2	0	2	1	+1	**4**	Advance to Knockout stage
3	Algeria	3	0	2	1	2	3	−1	**2**	
4	Zambia	3	0	1	2	2	4	−2	**1**	

Rules for classification: Group stage tiebreakers
8 March 1986

Algeria	0–0	Morocco
	Report

Alexandria Stadium, Alexandria
Attendance: 12,000
Referee: Ali Bennaceur (Tunisia)

8 March 1986

Cameroon	3–2	Zambia
Milla 46'; M'Fédé 67' (pen.), 82' (pen.)	Report	Chabala 65'; Bwalya 77' (pen.)

Alexandria Stadium, Alexandria
Attendance: 20,000
Referee: Idrissa Traoré (Mali)

11 March 1986

Algeria	0–0	Zambia
	Report

Alexandria Stadium, Alexandria
Attendance: 4,000
Referee: Karim Camara (Guinea)

11 March 1986

Cameroon	1–1	Morocco
Milla 89'	Report	Krimau 63'

Alexandria Stadium, Alexandria
Attendance: 8,000
Referee: Frank Valdemarca (Zimbabwe)

14 March 1986

Morocco	1–0	Zambia
Chilengi 18' (o.g.)	Report

Alexandria Stadium, Alexandria
Attendance: 5,000
Referee: Simon Bantsimba (Congo)

14 March 1986

Cameroon	3–2	Algeria
Kana-Biyik 66', 70'; Milla 72'	Report	Madjer 61'; Maroc 73'

Alexandria Stadium, Alexandria
Attendance: 10,000
Referee: Badou Jasseh (Gambia)

== Knockout stage ==
=== Bracket ===
Semi-finals
17 March – Alexandria
**Cameroon**	**1**
Ivory Coast	0
17 March – Cairo
**Egypt**	**1**
Morocco	0

Final
21 March – Cairo
Cameroon	0 (4)
**Egypt (p)**	**0 (5)**
Third place
20 March – Cairo
**Ivory Coast**	**3**
Morocco	2

=== Semi-finals ===
17 March 1986

Cameroon	1–0	Ivory Coast
Milla 46'	Report

Alexandria Stadium, Alexandria
Attendance: 12,000
Referee: Edwin Picon-Ackong (Mauritius)

17 March 1986

Egypt	1–0	Morocco
Abouzaid 79'	Report

Cairo International Stadium, Cairo
Attendance: 95,000
Referee: Gebreyesus Tesfaye (Ethiopia)

=== Third place match ===
20 March 1986

Ivory Coast	3–2	Morocco
Ben Salah 8'; Kassi-Kouadio 38', 68' (pen.)	Report	Rhiati 44'; Sahil 85'

Cairo International Stadium, Cairo
Attendance: 1,000
Referee: Frank Valdemarca (Zimbabwe)

=== Final ===
21 March 1986

Egypt	0–0 (a.e.t.)	Cameroon
	Report
Penalties
Yehia (penalty scored); Abdelghani (penalty scored); Abdou (penalty missed); Mayhoub (penalty scored); Shehata (penalty scored); Kassem (penalty scored)	5–4	(penalty scored) M'Fédé; (penalty scored) Kundé; (penalty missed) M'Bida; (penalty scored) Milla; (penalty scored) Aoudou; (penalty missed) Kana-Biyik

Cairo International Stadium, Cairo
Attendance: 95,000
Referee: Ali Bennaceur (Tunisia)

== Goalscorers ==
There were 31 goals scored in 16 matches, for an average of 1.94 goals per match.

4 goals

- (Cameroon) Roger Milla

3 goals

- (Egypt) Taher Abouzaid
- (Ivory Coast) Abdoulaye Traoré

2 goals

- (Cameroon) André Kana-Biyik
- (Cameroon) Louis-Paul M'Fédé
- (Ivory Coast) Lucien Kassi-Kouadio

1 goal

- (Algeria) Rabah Madjer
- (Algeria) Karim Maroc
- (Egypt) Shawky Gharib
- (Egypt) Gamal Abdelhamid
- (Ivory Coast) Kouassi N'Dri
- (Ivory Coast) Oumar Ben Salah
- (Morocco) Abdelkrim Merry "Krimau"
- (Morocco) Abdelfettah Rhiati
- (Morocco) Mohammed Sahil
- (Senegal) Jules Bocandé
- (Senegal) Pape Fall
- (Senegal) Thierno Youm
- (Zambia) Kalusha Bwalya
- (Zambia) Michael Chabala

1 own goal

- (Zambia) Jones Chilengi (against Morocco)

== Team of the Tournament ==
Goalkeeper	Defenders	Midfielders	Forwards
(Cameroon) Thomas N'Kono	(Cameroon) André Kana-Biyik (Egypt) Ali Shehata (Senegal) Roger Mendy (Egypt) Rabei Yassin	(Cameroon) Emile Mbouh (Egypt) Magdi Abdelghani (Egypt) Moustafa Abdou (Egypt) Taher Abouzaid	(Cameroon) Roger Milla (Zambia) Kalusha Bwalya
