= Clifton Msiya =

Malawian footballer (1964–2000)

Personal information
- Date of birth: 17 May 1964
- Date of death: 7 January 2000 (aged 35)
- Position: Left winger

Senior career*
Years	Team	Apps	(Gls)
1980–1992	Berec Power Pack/MDC United		

International career
1980–1991	Malawi	81	(8)
- * Club domestic league appearances and goals

Clifton Msiya (16 May 1964 – 7 January 2000) was a Malawian footballer who played as a left winger.

== Career ==
Msiya made 81 appearances for the Malawi national team between 1980 and 1991, scoring 8 goals. In 1983, he was awarded the Malawian Player of the Year.

At the 1984 African Cup of Nations, he scored the goal of the tournament in a 2–2 draw against Nigeria, and was later included in the team of the tournament. That year, he also was nominated for the African Footballer of the Year award.
