= Henry Nwosu =

Nigerian football player and manager (1963–2026)

Personal information
- Date of birth: 14 June 1963
- Place of birth: Imo State, Nigeria
- Date of death: 14 March 2026 (aged 62)
- Place of death: Ikeja, Lagos State, Nigeria
- Position: Midfielder

Senior career*
Years	Team	Apps	(Gls)
1979–1985	NNB FC	60	(11)
1985–1988	ACB Lagos		
1988–1990	ASEC Mimosas		
1990–1992	RC Bafoussam		
1992–1993	ACB Lagos		

International career
1980–1991	Nigeria	60	(8)

Managerial career
- 1997: Ibom Stars
- 2008–2009: Nigeria U17
- 2009–2013: Union Bank
- 2013–2026: Gateway United
- * Club domestic league appearances and goals

Henry Onyemanze Nwosu (14 June 1963 – 14 March 2026) was a Nigerian football manager and player.

== Club career ==
Nwosu spent his career at home with New Nigeria Bank (NNB) of Benin City and African Continental Bank (ACB) of Lagos. He also played for ASEC Mimosas FC of Ivory Coast and Racing FC Bafoussam of Cameroon.

== International career ==
Nwosu was the youngest member of the Nigeria national team's victorious 1980 African Nations Cup squad, and scored the only goal for Nigeria at the 1980 Olympics. He also played in the 1982, 1984 and 1988 tournaments, finishing runners up in the last two, with his last game for Nigeria coming in 1991.

== Coaching career ==
Nwosu was an assistant for former Nigeria teammate Samson Siasia at the 2008 Beijing Olympics where Nigeria won the silver medal. He was an assistant to Onigbinde that took the Super Eagles to 2002 FIFA World Cup in South Korea and Japan.

On 27 September 2008, Nwosu was appointed the coach of the Nigerian under-17 team. However, he was removed from the post in April 2009 after a string of poor results in preparation for the 2009 FIFA U-17 World Cup. Nwosu was hired that August as coach of Union Bank F.C.

In October 2013, he was named coach for Abeokuta club Gateway United.

== Death ==
Nwosu died on 14 March 2026, at the age of 62.
