= Ignace Guédé-Gba =

Ivorian footballer (1964–2021)

Personal information
- Date of birth: 10 October 1964
- Date of death: 29 December 2021 (aged 57)
- Height: 1.75 m (5 ft 9 in)
- Position: Forward

Senior career*
Years	Team	Apps	(Gls)
1986–1989	Africa Sports		
1989–1991	Gazélec Ajaccio	2	(1)
1993–1993	Africa Sports		

International career
1983–1989	Ivory Coast	5	(2)
- * Club domestic league appearances and goals

Ignace Guédé-Gba (10 October 1964 – 29 December 2021) was an Ivorian footballer who played as a forward.

Guédé-Gba played in five matches for the Ivory Coast national team from 1983 to 1989. He was named in the Ivory Coast's squad for the 1988 African Cup of Nations tournament. He died on 29 December 2021, at the age of 57.
