= Taher Abouzeid =

Egyptian footballer (born 1962)

Minister of State for Sports
- In office 16 July 2013 – 2014
- Prime Minister: Hazem Al Beblawi
- Preceded by: El Amry Farouk

Personal details
- Party: New Wafd Party (formerly)

Amer Taher Abou Zeid Alsayed, publicly known as Taher Abou Zeid, or Taher Abouzaid (both are correct translations from the original alphabet in Egyptian Arabic: عامر طاهر أبو زيد السيد) is an Egyptian politician and retired footballer. He held the office of the Egyptian Minister of State for Sports. He played as a midfielder for Al Ahly and the Egyptian national team.

== Sports career ==
Taher Abouzaid
Personal information
- Full name: Amer Taher Abouzaid Sayed
- Date of birth: 1 April 1962 (age 64)
- Place of birth: Asyut, Egypt
- Height: 1.80 m (5 ft 11 in)
- Position: Attacking midfielder

Youth career
- Al Ahly

Senior career*
Years	Team	Apps	(Gls)
1980–1993	Al Ahly	393	(89)

International career^{‡}
1982–1990	Egypt	57	(13)
Medal record
Men's football
Representing Egypt
Africa Cup of Nations
Winner	1986 Egypt
- * Club domestic league appearances and goals as of 1 July 2007 ‡ National team caps and goals as of 1 July 2007

In the FIFA U20 World Cup 1981 Taher Abouzaid was the top-scorer of the Egyptian team and the scorer of the World Cup. For many years Abouzaid played for the Egypt national football team. In the 1984 African Cup of Nations he was also the top scorer with four goals. In the 1986 African Cup of Nations he was the Egyptian team leading scorer helping his team to win the African Cup of Nations 1986. He also played in the 1990 FIFA World Cup finals. Abouzaid also played for Egypt at the 1984 Summer Olympics.

He was on the Al-Ahly's board of directors.

=== Honours ===
Personal

- Top Scorer of the FIFA U20 World Cup 1981.
- Top Scorer of the African Cup of Nations 1984.
- Second best African footballer of the year 1984.
- CAF official selection Africa all-star team 1986.
- Scored Seven goals for Egypt in African Cups of Nations
- Scored 23 Goals for Ahly in African Club Cups
- Winner 1986 African Cup of Nations.

International Career(Egypt)

- Represented Egypt in 1981 FIFA U20 World Cup. (Top-scorer)
- Represented Egypt in the 1984 African Cup of Nations. (Top-scorer)
- Represented Egypt in the 1986 African Cup of Nations. ( CAF all-star team).
- Represented Egypt in the 1984 Summer Olympics.
- Represented Egypt in FIFA World Cup 1990.

Club Career (Ahly)

- 7 Egyptian League titles 1979–1980,1980–81,1981–82,1984–85,1985–86,1986–87,1988–89.
- 8 Egyptian Soccer Cup titles 1980–81, 1982–83, 1983–84, 1984–85, 1988–89, 1990–91, 1991–92, 1992–93
- 2 African Champions League 1982, 1987
- 3 African Cup titles 1984, 1985, 1986
- 1 Afro-Asian Cup 1988
