= Théophile Abega =

Cameroonian footballer and politician (1954-2012)

Personal information
- Full name: Théophile Abega Mbida
- Date of birth: 9 July 1954
- Place of birth: Nkomo, Cameroon
- Date of death: 15 November 2012 (aged 58)
- Place of death: Yaoundé, Cameroon
- Position: Midfielder

Youth career
- Lion de Yaoundé
- Colombe Sportive

Senior career*
Years	Team	Apps	(Gls)
1974–1984	Canon Yaoundé		
1984–1985	Toulouse	22	(3)
1985–1987	Vevey-Sports		

International career
1982	Cameroon Olympic	3	(0)
1976–1987	Cameroon	37	(6)
Medal record
Men's football
Representing Cameroon
Africa Cup of Nations
Winner	1984 Ivory Coast
Runner-up	1986 Egypt
- * Club domestic league appearances and goals

Théophile Abega Mbida (9 July 1954 – 15 November 2012), nicknamed Doctor, was a Cameroonian football player and politician. Playing as a midfielder he was part of the Cameroon national team, playing all three matches at the 1982 FIFA World Cup and captaining the side to their first African Nations Cup victory in 1984, where he scored a goal in the final. He was nicknamed "The Doctor" in tribute to his footballing intelligence.

== Club career ==
Abega started his career with Lion de Yaoundé and later played for Colombe Sportive du Dja et Lobo. Afterwards, he played club football for Canon Yaoundé where he won the 1978 African Cup of Champions Clubs, 1980 African Cup of Champions Clubs and 1979 African Cup Winners' Cup titles as well as four Cameroonian championships and five Cameroonian Cups. Later in his career, he moved to France to play for Toulouse before finishing in Switzerland with Vevey-Sports.

== International career ==
Following a collision with the Zambia national team goalkeeper Efford Chabala at the 1986 African Cup of Nations Abega retired from football in 1987. He then went into politics, becoming the mayor of the sixth arrondissement of Yaoundé.

In 2006, he was selected by CAF as one of the best 200 African football players of the last 50 years.

== Death ==
Abega died of cardiac arrest at Yaoundé General Hospital, Yaoundé, Cameroon on 15 November 2012.

== Honours ==
Cameroon

- African Cup of Nations: 1984; runner-up, 1986
