= Joseph-Antoine Bell =

Cameroonian footballer (born 1954)

Personal information
- Date of birth: 8 October 1954 (age 72)
- Place of birth: Mouandé, Cameroon
- Height: 1.82 m (6 ft 0 in)
- Position: Goalkeeper

Senior career*
Years	Team	Apps	(Gls)
1975–1981	Union Douala		
1981–1983	Africa Sports		
1983–1985	Al Mokawloon Al Arab		
1985–1988	Marseille	109	(0)
1988–1989	Toulon	31	(0)
1989–1991	Bordeaux	75	(0)
1991–1994	Saint-Étienne	99	(0)

International career
1977–1994	Cameroon	50	(1)
Medal record
Men's football
Representing Cameroon
Africa Cup of Nations
Winner	1984 Ivory Coast
Winner	1988 Morocco
- * Club domestic league appearances and goals

Joseph-Antoine Bell (born 8 October 1954), sometimes referred to as JoJo Bell, is a Cameroonian former professional footballer who played as a goalkeeper. In a 20-year career, he played in his native Cameroon as well as in the Ivory Coast and Egypt before moving to France, where he played for several top-level clubs including Marseille, Bordeaux and eventually ending his playing career with Saint-Étienne. He played for the national team in three World Cups (1982, 1990, 1994), the 1984 Summer Olympics and several African Cup of Nations.

== Club career ==
Bell was born in Mouandé. He started his career in Eclair Douale then Oryx Douala and Prisons Buea beforeUnion Douala in Cameroon, where he spent the years 1975 to 1981. He then moved to Africa Sports National, staying there for two seasons. From 1983 to 1985 he played for Al-Mokawloon al-Arab in Egypt.

By the time he went to France to play, he was already 31 years old. He played for Olympique de Marseille from 1985 to 1988, playing 36, 38, and 35 league matches in each of his three seasons there. He then spent one season at Sporting Toulon Var, playing 31 matches. Two years at FC Girondins de Bordeaux followed, where he played 38 matches in 1989–90 and 37 matches in 1990–91. He ended his playing career with AS Saint-Étienne, where he played 35 matches in 1991–92 and 38 matches in 1992–93, but only 26 matches in 1993–94.

Bell, in joining the campaign United Against Malaria in 2009, stated that "malaria ... affected his playing".

== International career ==
For the national team, Bell was in the squads at the 1982 and 1990 FIFA World Cup but did not play any matches. He was also selected for the squad for the 1994 FIFA World Cup where he eventually made his debut, playing in two of Cameroon's group matches. After Cameroon's elimination in 1994, enraged fans set fire on Bell's house in Douala. Bell also played at the 1984 Summer Olympics, and was on Cameroon's winning team in the 1984 and 1988 African Cup of Nations. At international level, he competed for a starting goalkeeper spot with his perceived rival Thomas N'Kono for many years.

== Style of play ==
Considered to be one of the greatest African goalkeepers of all time, Bell often acted as a sweeper-keeper, and was known for his ability to rush out of the box to sweep up the ball when his team played with a high defensive line.

== Honours ==
Union Douala

- CAF Champions League: 1979

Al-Mokawloon al-Arab

- African Cup Winners' Cup: 1982, 1983
- Egyptian Premier League: 1983

Cameroon

- African Cup of Nations: 1984, 1988

Individual

Bell was named "African Goalkeeper of the Century" by IFFHS, as part of their "Century Elections". Cameroon had three goalkeepers among the top six, with Thomas N'Kono being second and Jacques Songo'o being sixth. Sadok Attouga was third, Badou Ezzaki was fourth and Mwemba Kazadi was fifth.
