= Ademola Adeshina =

Nigerian footballer

Personal information
- Full name: Ademola Adeshina
- Date of birth: 4 June 1964 (age 62)
- Place of birth: Nigeria
- Position: Midfielder

Senior career*
Years	Team	Apps	(Gls)
?–?	Abiola Babes		
1988–1990	Shooting Stars		
?–?	Lokeren		

International career
1988	Nigeria U23	3	(0)
1982–1990	Nigeria	47	(9)

Managerial career
- 2012: Prime F.C.
- * Club domestic league appearances and goals

Ademola Adeshina (born 4 June 1964) is a former Nigeria international football midfielder. He is currently the technical advisor of Nigeria National League team Prime F.C.

== Career ==
Born in Nigeria, Adeshina played club football for local sides Abiola Babes and Shooting Stars F.C., before a brief spell in Belgium with Sporting Lokeren.

Adeshina represented Nigeria at the 1988 Summer Olympics in Seoul. He also made several appearances for the senior Nigeria national football team, including five FIFA World Cup qualifying matches, and he played at the 1984 and 1988 and 1990 African Cup of Nations finals.
