= Pascal Miézan =

Ivorian footballer (1959–2006)

Personal information
- Full name: Pascal Miézan Aka
- Date of birth: 3 April 1959
- Place of birth: Gagnoa, Ivory Coast
- Date of death: July 31, 2006 (aged 47)
- Place of death: Abidjan, Ivory Coast
- Height: 1.72 m (5 ft 7 1/2 in)
- Position: Midfielder

Senior career*
Years	Team	Apps	(Gls)
1975–1985	Africa Sports		
1985–1986	Lierse	26	(2)
1986–1993	Africa Sports		

International career
1977–1989	Ivory Coast	32	(3)
- * Club domestic league appearances and goals

Pascal Miézan Aka (3 April 1959 – 31 July 2006) was an Ivorian professional footballer who played as a midfielder.

== Career ==
Miézan spent most of his career playing for Abidjan side Africa Sports. He also had a spell with Belgian First Division side Lierse.

Miézan made several appearances for the Ivory Coast national football team, including three appearances at the 1984 African Cup of Nations finals. He also played for Ivory Coast national under-20 football team at the 1977 FIFA World Youth Championship in Tunisia.

In 2006, he was selected by CAF as one of the best 200 African football players of the last 50 years.

== Honours ==
=== Africa Sports d'Abidjan ===
- Ivory Coast Ligue 1 (9): 1977, 1978, 1982, 1983, 1985, 1986, 1987, 1988, 1989
- Coupe de Côte d'Ivoire (8): 1977, 1978, 1979, 1981, 1982, 1986, 1989, 1993
- Coupe Houphouët-Boigny (9): 1977, 1979, 1981, 1982, 1987, 1988, 1989, 1991, 1993
- African Cup Winners' Cup (1): 1992
- CAF Super Cup (1): 1992
- WAFU Club Championship (2): 1986, 1991
