= 1984 African Cup of Nations =

14th edition of the Africa Cup of Nations

Coupe d'Afrique des Nations 1984
- Afcon 1984 official logo

Tournament details
- Host country: Ivory Coast
- Dates: 4–18 March
- Teams: 8
- Venues: 2 (in 2 host cities)

Final positions
- Champions: Cameroon (1st title)
- Runners-up: Nigeria
- Third place: Algeria
- Fourth place: Egypt

Tournament statistics
- Matches played: 16
- Goals scored: 39 (2.44 per match)
- Top scorer(s): (Egypt) Taher Abouzaid (4 goals)
- Best player: (Cameroon) Théophile Abega
- Best goalkeeper: (Cameroon) Joseph-Antoine Bell

The 1984 African Cup of Nations was the 14th edition of the African Cup of Nations, the international football championship run by the Confederation of African Football (CAF). It was hosted by the Ivory Coast. Just like in 1982, the field of eight teams was split into two groups of four.

Cameroon won its first championship, defeating Nigeria 3−1 in the final.

== Qualified teams ==
The 8 qualified teams are:

| Team | Qualified as | Qualified on | Previous appearances in tournament (Note: Bold indicates champion for that year, Italic indicates host.) |
|---|---|---|---|
| Ivory Coast | Hosts | | 5 (1965, 1968, 1970, 1974, 1980) |
| Ghana | Holders | 19 March 1982 | 7 (**1963**, **1965**, 1968, 1970, **1978**, 1980, **1982**) |
| Algeria | 2nd round winners | 28 August 1983 | 3 (1968, 1980, 1982) |
| Cameroon | 2nd round winners | 28 August 1983 | 3 (1970, 1972, 1982) |
| Egypt | 2nd round winners | 28 August 1983 | 8 (**1957**, **1959**, 1962, 1963, 1970, 1974, 1976, 1980) |
| Malawi | 2nd round winners | 28 August 1983 | 0 (debut) |
| Nigeria | 2nd round winners | 28 August 1983 | 5 (1963, 1976, 1978, **1980**, 1982) |
| Togo | 2nd round winners | 28 August 1983 | 1 (1972) |

== Venues ==
The competition was played in two venues in Abidjan and Bouaké.

| Abidjan | 1984 African Cup of Nations is located in Ivory Coast |
| Stade Félix Houphouët-Boigny | 1984 African Cup of Nations is located in Ivory Coast |
| Capacity: **40,000** | 1984 African Cup of Nations is located in Ivory Coast |
| Bouaké | 1984 African Cup of Nations is located in Ivory Coast |
| Stade Bouaké | 1984 African Cup of Nations is located in Ivory Coast |
| Capacity: **35,000** | 1984 African Cup of Nations is located in Ivory Coast |

== Group stage ==
=== Tiebreakers ===
If two or more teams finished level on points after completion of the group matches, the following tie-breakers were used to determine the final ranking:

1. Goal difference in all group matches
2. Greater number of goals scored in all group matches
3. Drawing of lots

=== Group A ===
| Pos | Team | Pld | W | D | L | GF | GA | GD | Pts | Qualification |
|---|---|---|---|---|---|---|---|---|---|---|
| 1 | Egypt | 3 | 2 | 1 | 0 | 3 | 1 | +2 | **5** | Advance to Knockout stage |
| 2 | Cameroon | 3 | 2 | 0 | 1 | 6 | 2 | +4 | **4** | Advance to Knockout stage |
| 3 | Ivory Coast (H) | 3 | 1 | 0 | 2 | 4 | 4 | 0 | **2** | |
| 4 | Togo | 3 | 0 | 1 | 2 | 1 | 7 | −6 | **1** | |

Rules for classification: Group stage tiebreakers
(H) Hosts
4 March 1984

| Ivory Coast | 3–0 | Togo |
|---|---|---|
| Koffi 27'; Fofana 62'; Goba 75' | Report |

Stade Félix Houphouët-Boigny, Abidjan
Attendance: 50,000
Referee: Ali Bennaceur (Tunisia)

4 March 1984

| Egypt | 1–0 | Cameroon |
|---|---|---|
| Abouzaid 78' | Report |

Stade Félix Houphouët-Boigny, Abidjan
Attendance: 50,000
Referee: Gebreyesus Tesfaye (Ethiopia)

7 March 1984

| Cameroon | 4–1 | Togo |
|---|---|---|
| Djonkep 7'; Abega 21', 61'; Aoudou 45' | Report | Moutairou 56' |

Stade Félix Houphouët-Boigny, Abidjan
Attendance: 15,000
Referee: Mulenga Rezzin (Zambia)

7 March 1984

| Ivory Coast | 1–2 | Egypt |
|---|---|---|
| Miézan 53' | Report | Abouzaid 66', 72' |

Stade Félix Houphouët-Boigny, Abidjan
Attendance: 40,000
Referee: Edwin Picon-Ackong (Mauritius)

10 March 1984

| Egypt | 0–0 | Togo |
|---|---|---|
| | Report |

Stade Félix Houphouët-Boigny, Abidjan
Attendance: 40,000
Referee: Frank Valdemarca (Zimbabwe)

10 March 1984

| Ivory Coast | 0–2 | Cameroon |
|---|---|---|
| | Report | Milla 42'; Djonkep 61' |

Stade Félix Houphouët-Boigny, Abidjan
Attendance: 40,000
Referee: Mohamed Larache (Morocco)

=== Group B ===
| Pos | Team | Pld | W | D | L | GF | GA | GD | Pts | Qualification |
|---|---|---|---|---|---|---|---|---|---|---|
| 1 | Algeria | 3 | 2 | 1 | 0 | 5 | 0 | +5 | **5** | Advance to Knockout stage |
| 2 | Nigeria | 3 | 1 | 2 | 0 | 4 | 3 | +1 | **4** | Advance to Knockout stage |
| 3 | Ghana | 3 | 1 | 0 | 2 | 2 | 4 | −2 | **2** | |
| 4 | Malawi | 3 | 0 | 1 | 2 | 2 | 6 | −4 | **1** | |

Rules for classification: Group stage tiebreakers
5 March 1984

| Ghana | 1–2 | Nigeria |
|---|---|---|
| Opoku N'ti 19' | Report | Nwosu 13'; Ehilegbu 31' |

Stade Bouaké, Bouaké
Attendance: 10,000
Referee: Dodou N'Jie (Gambia)

5 March 1984

| Algeria | 3–0 | Malawi |
|---|---|---|
| Bouiche 29'; Belloumi 36'; Fergani 38' | Report |

Stade Bouaké, Bouaké
Attendance: 10,000
Referee: Bakary Sarr (Senegal)

8 March 1984

| Malawi | 2–2 | Nigeria |
|---|---|---|
| Waya 7' (pen.); Msiya 35' | Report | Temile 39', 41' |

Stade Bouaké, Bouaké
Attendance: 15,000
Referee: Hassan Abdel Hafiz (Sudan)

8 March 1984

| Algeria | 2–0 | Ghana |
|---|---|---|
| Menad 75'; Bensaoula 85' | Report |

Stade Bouaké, Bouaké
Attendance: 15,000
Referee: Mohamed Bahhou (Morocco)

11 March 1984

| Algeria | 0–0 | Nigeria |
|---|---|---|
| | Report |

Stade Bouaké, Bouaké
Attendance: 3,000
Referee: Karim Camara (Guinea)

11 March 1984

| Ghana | 1–0 | Malawi |
|---|---|---|
| Amphadu 32' | Report |

Stade Bouaké, Bouaké
Attendance: 3,000
Referee: Salem Mohamed Adal (Libya)

== Knockout stage ==
=== Bracket ===
Semi-finals
14 March – Abidjan
Egypt | 2 (7)
**Nigeria (pen.)** | **2 (8)**
14 March – Bouaké
Algeria | 0 (4)
**Cameroon (pen.)** | **0 (5)**

Final
18 March – Abidjan
Nigeria | 1
**Cameroon** | **3**
Third place
17 March – Abidjan
Egypt | 1
**Algeria** | **3**

=== Semi-finals ===
14 March 1984

| Egypt | 2–2 (a.e.t.) | Nigeria |
|---|---|---|
| Sulaiman 25'; Abouzaid 38' | Report | Keshi 43' (pen.); Bala 75' |
Penalties
| Abdelghani (penalty scored); Shehata (penalty scored); Ghareeb (penalty scored); El Khatib (penalty scored); Abouzeid (penalty scored); Nassef (penalty scored); Yassin (penalty scored); Hassan (penalty missed); Youssef (penalty missed) | 7–8 | (penalty scored) Kingsley; (penalty scored) Edobor; (penalty scored) Shofoluwe; (penalty scored) Ali; (penalty scored) Keshi; (penalty scored) Yekini; (penalty scored) Temile; (penalty missed) Adeshina; (penalty scored) Lawal |

Stade Félix Houphouët-Boigny, Abidjan
Attendance: 15,000
Referee: Dodou N'Jie (Gambia)

14 March 1984

| Algeria | 0–0 (a.e.t.) | Cameroon |
|---|---|---|
| | Report |
Penalties
| Belloumi (penalty scored); Yahi (penalty scored); Kaci-Saïd (penalty scored); Guendouz (penalty missed); Madjer (penalty scored) | 4–5 | (penalty scored) Kundé; (penalty scored) Ebongué; (penalty scored) Aoudou; (penalty scored) Bell; (penalty scored) Ndoumbé |

Stade Bouaké, Bouaké
Attendance: 15,000
Referee: Edwin Picon-Ackong (Mauritius)

=== Third place match ===
17 March 1984

| Algeria | 3–1 | Egypt |
|---|---|---|
| Madjer 68'; Belloumi 71'; Yahi 90' | Report | Abdelghani 76' (pen.) |

Stade Félix Houphouët-Boigny, Abidjan
Attendance: 500
Referee: Mohammed Larache (Morocco)

=== Final ===
18 March 1984

| Cameroon | 3–1 | Nigeria |
|---|---|---|
| N'Djeya 32'; Abega 79'; Ebongué 84' | Report | Lawal 10' |

Stade Félix Houphouët-Boigny, Abidjan
Attendance: 27,456
Referee: Ali Bennaceur (Tunisia)

== Goalscorers ==
There were 39 goals scored in 16 matches, for an average of 2.44 goals per match.

4 goals

- (Egypt) Taher Abouzeid

3 goals

- (Cameroon) Théophile Abéga

2 goals

- (Algeria) Lakhdar Belloumi
- (Cameroon) Bonaventure Djonkep
- (Nigeria) Clement Temile

1 goal

- (Algeria) Tedj Bensaoula
- (Algeria) Nasser Bouiche
- (Algeria) Ali Fergani
- (Algeria) Rabah Madjer
- (Algeria) Djamel Menad
- (Algeria) Hocine Yahi
- (Cameroon) Ibrahim Aoudou
- (Cameroon) Ernest Ebongué
- (Cameroon) René Ndjeya
- (Cameroon) Roger Milla
- (Egypt) Magdi Abdelghani
- (Egypt) Emad Soliman
- (Ghana) Seth Ampadu
- (Ghana) Opoku Nti
- (Ivory Coast) Youssouf Fofana
- (Ivory Coast) Michel Goba
- (Ivory Coast) Tia Koffi
- (Ivory Coast) Pascal Miezan
- (Malawi) Clifton Msiya
- (Malawi) Harry Waya
- (Nigeria) Ali Bala
- (Nigeria) Chibuzor Ehilegbu
- (Nigeria) Stephen Keshi
- (Nigeria) Muda Lawal
- (Nigeria) Henry Nwosu
- (Togo) Rafiou Moutairou

== Team of the Tournament ==
| Goalkeeper | Defenders | Midfielders | Forwards |
|---|---|---|---|
| (Cameroon) Joseph-Antoine Bell | (Cameroon) Isaac Sinkot (Egypt) Ali Shehata (Egypt) Ibrahim Youssef (Nigeria) Stephen Keshi | (Algeria) Lakhdar Belloumi (Cameroon) Théophile Abega (Egypt) Taher Abouzeid (Nigeria) Clement Temile | (Algeria) Djamel Menad (Malawi) Clifton Msiya |
