= Clement Temile =

Nigerian football player and coach

Personal information
- Place of birth: Nigeria
- Position: Winger

Senior career*
Years	Team	Apps	(Gls)
1983–1986	Bendel Insurance		
1990–1992	Beitar Netanya		

International career
	Nigeria	6	(3)

Managerial career
- 2006–2008: Kentish Town
- * Club domestic league appearances and goals

Clement Temile is a Nigerian football coach and former player who was the manager of English side Kentish Town, who played at Step 5 of the English Non-League football pyramid. He is the father of Israeli international Toto Tamuz, who was raised by an Israeli woman after Temile, who was playing in Israel at the time, returned to Nigeria. Clement is also the uncle of Omonigho Temile and Frank Temile.

== Education ==
Temile attended Hussey College Warri.

== Playing career ==
During his playing career he played for Bendel Insurance in Nigeria and Beitar Netanya in Israel, as well as the Nigerian national side. He appeared in one FIFA World Cup qualifying match in 1984.

== Managerial career ==
Contrary to a report in an English newspaper, Temile was not offered the job of Nigeria manager. In April 2008 according to Chairman of NFA Technical Committee, Chief Taiwo Ogunjobi, Temile was never approached to take over the vacant position of the Nigerian national side.
