= Emad Soliman =

Egyptian footballer (born 1959)

Personal information
- Date of birth: 23 July 1959 (age 67)
- Position: Forward

Senior career*
Years	Team	Apps	(Gls)
1977–1994	Ismaily SC		
1994–1996	El Qanah FC		

International career
1983–1988	Egypt	51	(14)

Managerial career
- 2012: Abha
- * Club domestic league appearances and goals

Emad Soliman (Arabic: عِمَاد سُلَيْمَان; born 23 July 1959) is an Egyptian former footballer. He competed in the men's tournament at the 1984 Summer Olympics.
