= Ali Shehata =

Egyptian association football player

Personal information
- Full name: Ali SHehata
- Date of birth: 25 April 1959 (age 67)
- Place of birth: Egypt
- Position: Right-back

Senior career*
Years	Team	Apps	(Gls)
- Al Mokawloon Al Arab SC

International career
1983–1988	Egypt	51	(1)
Medal record
Men's football
Representing Egypt
Africa Cup of Nations
Winner	1986 Egypt
- * Club domestic league appearances and goals

Ali Shehata (born April 25, 1959), is a retired Egyptian footballer.

== Career ==
At the beginning of the 1980s, Ali Shehata emerged as a prominent football player. However, at the very height of his abilities, he made the significant decision to retire in 1988. His motivation for stepping away from football was to focus on his academic ambitions, first pursuing a master's degree and then a doctorate.

He returned as a player with Al-Mokawloon Al-Arab (Arab Contractors)

== Club Career with Al-Mokawloon ==
Shehata's club career was marked by his time with Al-Mokawloon. His excellence on the pitch was crucial in leading his team to the final of the Egypt Cup in 1981. Despite their valiant efforts, the team lost to Al-Ahly, with Shehata missing the third penalty in the decisive shootout. The following season, 1982–1983, was historic for Al-Mokawloon. Shehata, alongside a formidable group of players including Alaa Khalil, Nabil Ammar, Gamal Salem, Adel El-Kordi, Zamzam, Saeed El-Shishiny, Mohamed Radwan, Nabil Ibrahim, Abouda, Hamdy Nouh, Nasser Mohamed Ali, the renowned Cameroonian goalkeeper Joseph Antoine-Bell, and Ghanaian star Karim Abdul-Razak, helped secure the league title for the first time in the club's history.

== Continental Success ==
On the African stage, Al-Mokawloon's golden generation, with Shehata playing a key role, achieved remarkable success in their first continental competition. They won the African Cup Winners’ Cup in 1982, defeating Zambia's Power Dynamos in the final, and impressively retained the title the following year after overcoming Agaza Lomé of Togo.

== International career ==
Ali Shehata also made a significant impact internationally, representing Egypt between 1983 and 1987. He succeeded Zamalek star Mohamed Salah as right-back and participated in the 1984 Africa Cup of Nations in Côte d'Ivoire, where he was chosen as part of the tournament's best XI. His international achievements continued as he played a key role in helping Egypt win the Africa Cup of Nations title in 1986 on home soil. Once again, he was recognised among the tournament's top eleven players, notably scoring the fourth penalty against Cameroon's legendary goalkeeper, Thomas N’Kono. Additionally, Shehata was a member of the national squad that clinched the gold medal at the 1987 All-Africa Games in Nairobi, scoring the second penalty in the semifinal against Jacques Songo’o, goalkeeper of the “Indomitable Lions” of Cameroon. He had previously helped Egypt reach the quarterfinals of the 1984 Los Angeles Olympics, contributing the fourth goal in a group stage victory over Costa Rica.

== Academic ==
Alongside his football achievements, Ali Shehata excelled in his academic life. He earned a bachelor's degree in Dentistry and continued his studies, obtaining a master's degree and then a doctorate in oral and maxillofacial surgery.
