= Edwin Picon-Ackong =

Mauritian football referee (born 1940)

- Full name: Edwin Sydney Picon-Ackong
- Born: November 4, 1940 (age 85)

International
Years	League	Role

Edwin Sydney Picon-Ackong (born November 4, 1940) is a Mauritian who is a retired football referee. He is known for having refereed one match in the 1986 FIFA World Cup in Mexico between Iraq and Paraguay. Some of the Iraqi team officials and players reacted angrily when Picon-Ackong blew the whistle for half time a few seconds before Iraq striker Ahmed Radhi headed the ball into the goal, meaning that it did not count.
