= Ernest Ebongué =

Cameroonian footballer (born 1962)

Érnest Ebongué
Personal information
- Full name: Érnest-Lottin Ebongué
- Date of birth: May 15, 1962 (age 64)
- Place of birth: Yaoundé, Cameroon
- Position: Forward

Senior career*
Years	Team	Apps	(Gls)
1980–1986	Tonnerre Yaoundé		
1986–1987	Béziers	14	(3)
1987–1988	Fécamp		
1988–1989	Vitoria Guimarães	10	(0)
1989–1992	Varzim	93	(32)
1992–1993	Aves	23	(2)
1993–1994	Lamego	2	(0)
1994–1996	Persma Manado		
1996–1997	Pupuk Kaltim	20	(11)
1997–1998	ASK Kottingbrunn	10	(2)

International career
1981–1993	Cameroon	45	(9)
Medal record
Men's football
Representing Cameroon
Africa Cup of Nations
Winner	1984 Ivory Coast
Runner-up	Egypt 1986
- * Club domestic league appearances and goals

Érnest-Lottin Ebongué (born May 15, 1962 in Yaoundé) is a Cameroonian former professional footballer who played as a forward. He was capped eight times for the Cameroonian national team, scoring once and was part of the team for the 1982 World Cup, playing in all three matches.

== Honours ==
Cameroon

- African Cup of Nations: 1984; runner-up, 1986
