= Mudashiru Lawal =

Nigerian footballer (1954–1991)

Muda Lawal
Personal information
- Full name: Mudashiru Babatunde Lawal
- Date of birth: 8 June 1954
- Place of birth: Abeokuta, British Nigeria
- Date of death: 6 July 1991 (aged 37)
- Place of death: Ibadan, Nigeria
- Position: Midfielder

Senior career*
Years	Team	Apps	(Gls)
1975–1984	Shooting Stars F.C.		
1985–1986	Stationery Stores F.C.		
1987–1988	Abiola Babes		
1989–1991	Shooting Stars F.C.		

International career
1975–1985	Nigeria	86	(11)
- * Club domestic league appearances and goals

Mudashiru Babatunde "Muda" Lawal (8 June 1954 – 6 July 1991) was a Nigerian footballer who played as a midfielder for both club and country.

== Club career ==
He worked as an automobile mechanic before his football talents were discovered, and made his national team debut in 1975. The same year, he joined Shooting Stars F.C. of Ibadan, where he would play for many years. In 1976, he helped the club to their first continental title, winning the African Cup Winners Cup – the first Nigerian team to do so. In 1985 the club side was disbanded by a military governor. Muda returned to the side four seasons later as an assistant coach/player.

== International career ==
Muda made his international debut in 1975, and won 86 caps and scored 11 goals for his country; he holds the record of being the only player on the continent to have appeared at five consecutive Nations' Cup finals (1976–1984). Lawal helped Nigeria to its first African Nations Cup title, at the 1980 African Nations Cup. The team also competed at the Summer Olympics the same year.

Lawal played his last international match on 18 August 1985, when Nigeria lost to Zambia in the 1986 African Cup of Nations qualifier.

== Death ==
Lawal died at his home in 1991. The Ashero Stadium in his hometown Abeokuta was renamed the Mudashiru Lawal Stadium after him upon his death.

== Honours ==
Nigeria

- Africa Cup of Nations: 1980; runner-up:1984
