= Ibrahim Aoudou =

Cameroonian footballer (1955–2022)

Personal information
- Full name: Ibrahim Aoudou
- Date of birth: 23 August 1955
- Place of birth: Mbalmayo, Cameroon
- Date of death: 19 April 2022 (aged 66)
- Height: 1.85 m (6 ft 1 in)
- Position: Defender

Senior career*
Years	Team	Apps	(Gls)
1976–1981	Canon Yaoundé		
1981–1984	Cannes	85	(3)
1985–1986	RC Besancon	22	(0)
1986–1987	US Corte	0	(0)

International career
1979–1986	Cameroon	48	(4)
Medal record
Men's football
Representing Cameroon
Africa Cup of Nations
Winner	1984 Ivory Coast
Runner-up	1986 Egypt
- * Club domestic league appearances and goals

Ibrahim Aoudou (23 August 1955 – 19 April 2022) was a Cameroonian professional footballer who played as a defender. He was born in Mbalmayo. He competed for the Cameroon national team at the 1982 FIFA World Cup as a winger. At a club level, he joined French club AS Cannes from Canon Yaoundé in 1981 and stayed there for three years before ending his career with two short stints at RC Besancon and US Corte.

Aoudou also competed at the 1984 Summer Olympics. In 2006, he was selected by CAF as one of the best 200 African football players of the last 50 years.

== Honours ==
Cameroon

- African Cup of Nations: 1984; runner-up, 1986
