= Ali Ben Nasser =

Tunisian football referee (born 1944)

Ali Ben Nasser (also spelled Ali Bennaceur, Arabic: علي بن ناصر; born 2 March 1944) is a Tunisian former football referee, who famously referred the Argentina v England match in the 1986 FIFA World Cup.

== 1986 FIFA World Cup ==
=== Argentina-England refereeing dispute ===
Nasser refereed the match between Argentina and England in the 1986 FIFA World Cup, where the "Hand of God" and the "Goal of the Century" were scored by Argentine captain Diego Maradona to win the match. For the "Hand of God" goal, Maradona punched the ball into the net, however, Ben Nasser said that he did not see this and thought that Maradona had headed the ball.

Both Ben Nasser and his Bulgarian assistant linesman Bogdan Dochev famously blamed each other for the handball being missed. Ben Nasser said he waited for a signal from Dochev of a handball, but since it never came, he awarded the goal. TV footage backs this up, as it shows Ben Nasser looking at him after the goal expectantly. Dochev, however, blamed Ben Nasser, saying that at the time assistant referees were not allowed by FIFA to discuss decisions with referees: whatever the referee decided was final. He suggested Ben Nasser's inexperience at the highest levels of football in World Cup was to blame.

=== Further appearances ===
At the 1986 FIFA World Cup finals, he was also the first official in the group match between Poland and Portugal as well as an assistant in three further matches at the tournament, including the round of 16 fixture between Denmark and Spain. He never officiated a FIFA World Cup match again after the 1986 tournament.

== Later life ==
On 17 August 2015, Maradona visited Ben Nasser at his home in Tunisia and paid tribute to him, offering him an Argentine jersey bearing his signature and called him his "eternal friend."
