= 1976 African Cup of Nations squads =

Below is a list of squads used in the 1976 African Cup of Nations.

== Egypt ==
Coach: (Germany) Burkhard Pape

No.	Pos.	Player	Date of birth (age)	Caps	Goals	Club
	GK	Hassan Ali	29 December 1949 (aged 26)			(Egyptian Football Association) Tersana SC
	GK	Thabet El-Batal	16 September 1953 (aged 22)			(Egyptian Football Association) Al Ahly SC
	GK	Ekramy El-Shahat	26 October 1955 (aged 20)			(Egyptian Football Association) Al Ahly SC
	DF	Hassan Hamdy	2 August 1949 (aged 26)			(Egyptian Football Association) Al Ahly SC
	DF	Ahmed Abdel-Baqi	1 February 1952 (aged 24)			(Egyptian Football Association) Al Ahly SC
	DF	Fathi Mabrouk	5 July 1951 (aged 24)			(Egyptian Football Association) Al Ahly SC
	DF	Mahmoud El-Gohary Jr				(Egyptian Football Association) Zamalek SC
	DF	Mohammed Salah El Din	29 March 1956 (aged 19)			(Egyptian Football Association) Zamalek SC
	DF	Mohamed El Seyagui	20 January 1949 (aged 27)			(Egyptian Football Association) Ghazl El-Mahalla
	DF	Ghanem Sultan	5 September 1952 (aged 23)			(Egyptian Football Association) Zamalek SC
	DF	Moustafa Younis	25 December 1953 (aged 22)			(Egyptian Football Association) Al Ahly SC
	MF	Ibrahim Youssef	1 January 1959 (aged 17)			(Egyptian Football Association) Zamalek SC
	MF	Hassan Shehata	19 June 1947 (aged 28)			(Egyptian Football Association) Zamalek SC
	MF	Farouk Gaafar	29 October 1952 (aged 23)			(Egyptian Football Association) Zamalek SC
	MF	Mokhtar Mokhtar	17 August 1954 (aged 21)			(Egyptian Football Association) Al Ahly SC
	MF	Mahmoud Abdeldayem				(Egyptian Football Association) Ghazl El-Mahalla
	MF	Taha Basry	2 October 1946 (aged 29)			(Egyptian Football Association) Zamalek SC
	FW	Mostafa Abdou	10 June 1953 (aged 22)			(Egyptian Football Association) Al Ahly SC
	FW	Mahmoud El Khatib	30 October 1954 (aged 21)			(Egyptian Football Association) Al Ahly SC
	FW	Ossama Khalil	5 February 1954 (aged 22)			(Egyptian Football Association) Ismaily
	FW	Ahmed Abou Rehab				(Egyptian Football Association) Esco
	FW	Omar Abdallah				(Egyptian Football Association) Ghazl El-Mahalla
	FW	Mohamed Omasha				(Egyptian Football Association) Ghazl El-Mahalla

== Guinea ==
Coach: (Romania) Petre Moldoveanu

No.	Pos.	Player	Date of birth (age)	Caps	Goals	Club
	GK	Abdoulaye Sylla	1951			(Guinean Football Federation) Hafia
	DF	Jacob Bangoura	1945			(Guinean Football Federation) Hafia
	DF	Djibril Diarra				(Guinean Football Federation)
	MF	Naby Laye Camara	1951			(Guinean Football Federation) Hafia
	MF	Bangaly Condé				(Guinean Football Federation)
14	MF	Chérif Souleymane	20 October 1944 (aged 31)			(Guinean Football Federation) Hafia
	MF	Bengally Sylla	1951			(Guinean Football Federation) Hafia
	FW	Morciré Sylla	3 March 1948 (aged 27)			(Guinean Football Federation) Hafia
	FW	Youssouf Camara	6 March 1953 (aged 22)			(Guinean Football Federation) Hafia
	FW	Petit Sory	30 November 1944 (aged 31)			(Guinean Football Federation) Hafia
	FW	Ally Sylla				(Guinean Football Federation)
	FW	Ibrahima Fofana	1946			(Guinean Football Federation) Hafia
19	FW	Mamadou Aliou Keïta	1952			(Guinean Football Federation) Hafia
	FW	Mory Koné				(Guinean Football Federation)

== Ethiopia ==
Coach: (Germany) Peter Schnittger

No.	Pos.	Player	Date of birth (age)	Caps	Goals	Club
1	GK	Getachew Abebe				(Ethiopian Football Federation) Saint George
	DF	Matyazewal Gezaghne				
	DF	Alemayehu Haile Selassie				
	DF	Asfaw Bayou				(Ethiopian Football Federation) Saint George
	DF	Asrat Haile	1951			(Ethiopian Football Federation) Saint George
	MF	Ahmed Buker				(Ethiopian Football Federation) Saint George
	MF	Goshu Hailu				(Ethiopian Football Federation) Omedla FC
	MF	Tekalinge Kassahun	23 August 1950 (aged 25)			(Ethiopian Football Federation) Saint George
	MF	Medhin Kibrom				
	FW	Adem Bekeri				(Ethiopian Football Federation) Dire Dawa Railway
	FW	Seyoum Tesfaye				
	FW	Berhane Mulugeta				
	FW	Solomon Sheferahu				(Ethiopian Football Federation) Ethiopian Arlines
	FW	Mohamed Ali Shedad	1 September 1951 (aged 24)			(Ethiopian Football Federation) EEPCO
	FW	Gebre Neguse	1955			(Ethiopian Football Federation) Omedla FC
	FW	Engdawork Tariku	1945			(Ethiopian Football Federation) Mai Anbessa
	MF	Fekade Muleta				(Ethiopian Football Federation) EEPCO

== Uganda ==
Coach: David Otti

No.	Pos.	Player	Date of birth (age)	Caps	Goals	Club
1	GK	Hussein Matovu				(Federation of Uganda Football Associations) Kampala City Council
	DF	Jimmy Kirunda	1950			(Federation of Uganda Football Associations) Kampala City Council
	DF	Ashe Mukasa	1 April 1952 (aged 23)			(Federation of Uganda Football Associations) Express
	MF	Edward Semwanga				(Federation of Uganda Football Associations)
	DF	Tom Lwanga				(Federation of Uganda Football Associations)
	FW	Denis Obua	13 June 1947 (aged 28)			(Federation of Uganda Football Associations) Police FC
	MF	Francis Kulabigwo	1944			(Federation of Uganda Football Associations) Simba
	MF	Moses Nsereko	1952			(Federation of Uganda Football Associations) Kampala City Council
	MF	Stanley Mubiru				(Federation of Uganda Football Associations) Express
	FW	Phillip Omondi	1957			(Federation of Uganda Football Associations) Kampala City Council
	FW	Leo Adraa	1952			(Federation of Uganda Football Associations) Nsambya Old Timers
	FW	Polly Ouma	21 January 1942 (aged 34)			(Federation of Uganda Football Associations) Simba
	MF	Mike Kiganda				(Federation of Uganda Football Associations)
	GK	Ali Sendegeya				(Federation of Uganda Football Associations) Coffee United
	MF	Godfrey Kisitu	1951			(Federation of Uganda Football Associations)
	FW	Jimmy Muguwa	20 June 1954 (aged 21)			(Federation of Uganda Football Associations) UCB FC

== Morocco ==
Coach: (Romania) Virgil Mărdărescu

No.	Pos.	Player	Date of birth (age)	Caps	Goals	Club
	GK	Mohammed Hazzaz	30 November 1944 (aged 31)			(Royal Moroccan Football Federation) MAS Fez
	DF	Larbi Aherdane	6 June 1954 (aged 21)			(Royal Moroccan Football Federation) Wydad Casablanca
	DF	Jawad El Andaloussi	15 July 1955 (aged 20)			(Royal Moroccan Football Federation) Wydad Casablanca
	DF	Brahim Glaoua				(Royal Moroccan Football Federation) SCC Mohammédia
	MF	Abdallah Semmat	1951			(Royal Moroccan Football Federation) US Sidi Kacem
	DF	Mehdi Belmejdoub	4 February 1942 (aged 34)			(Royal Moroccan Football Federation) FAR Rabat
	MF	Abdelmajid Dolmy	19 April 1953 (aged 22)			(Royal Moroccan Football Federation) Raja Casablanca
	DF	Chérif Fetoui	1 February 1945 (aged 31)			(Royal Moroccan Football Federation) Difaâ Hassani El Jadidi
7	MF	Ahmed Makrouh	17 September 1953 (aged 22)			(Royal Moroccan Football Federation) Difaâ Hassani El Jadidi
	MF	Ahmed Moujahid				(Royal Moroccan Football Federation) Wydad Casablanca
	MF	Kamel Smiri				(Royal Moroccan Football Federation) MC Oujda
	MF	Abdallah Tazi	30 November 1944 (aged 31)			(Royal Moroccan Football Federation) MAS Fez
	MF	Abdelâali Zahraoui	9 January 1949 (aged 27)			(Royal Moroccan Football Federation) MAS Fez
	FW	Hassan "Acila" Amcharrat	1948			(Royal Moroccan Football Federation) SCC Mohammédia
19	FW	Ahmed Faras	7 December 1946 (aged 29)			(Royal Moroccan Football Federation) SCC Mohammédia
	FW	Redouane El Guezzar	1950			(Royal Moroccan Football Federation) MAS Fez
	FW	Driss Haddadi				(Royal Moroccan Football Federation) SCC Mohammédia

== Nigeria ==
Coach: (Socialist Federal Republic of Yugoslavia) Tiko Jelisavcic

No.	Pos.	Player	Date of birth (age)	Caps	Goals	Club
	GK	Joseph Eriko	1949			(Nigeria Football Federation) NEPA Lagos
	GK	Prince Zion Ogunfeyimi	1950			(Nigeria Football Federation) Shooting Stars
	DF	Sani Mohammed				(Nigeria Football Federation) Racca Rovers
	DF	Godwin Odiye	17 April 1956 (aged 19)			(Nigeria Football Federation) Nestle Lagos
	DF	Idowu Otubusin	17 March 1945 (aged 30)			(Nigeria Football Federation) Shooting Stars
	DF	Ike Ezedinma				(Nigeria Football Federation) Enugu Rangers
5	DF	Christian Chukwu (C)	4 January 1951 (aged 25)			(Nigeria Football Federation) Enugu Rangers
	MF	Samuel Ojebode	14 July 1944 (aged 31)			(Nigeria Football Federation) Shooting Stars
	MF	Adekunle Awesu	16 November 1950 (aged 25)			(Nigeria Football Federation) Shooting Stars
4	MF	Muda Lawal	8 June 1954 (aged 21)			(Nigeria Football Federation) Shooting Stars
	MF	Haruna Ilerika	27 October 1949 (aged 26)			(Nigeria Football Federation) Stationery Stores
	MF	Baba Otu Mohammed				(Nigeria Football Federation) Mighty Jets
	MF	Francis Okorie				(Nigeria Football Federation) P & T Vasco da Gama
	FW	Thompson Usiyan	27 April 1956 (aged 19)			(Nigeria Football Federation) Ndoro Island
	FW	Alloysius Atuegbu	29 April 1953 (aged 22)			(Nigeria Football Federation) Enugu Rangers
	FW	Kelechi Emeteole	1951			(Nigeria Football Federation) Enugu Rangers
	FW	Sunday Oyarekhua				(Nigeria Football Federation) Police FC
	FW	Kenneth Olayombo	29 August 1947 (aged 28)			(Nigeria Football Federation) Nigeria Army
	FW	Alex Nwosu	5 July 1953 (aged 22)			(Nigeria Football Federation) Enugu Rangers
	FW	Ogidinma Ibeabuchi				(Nigeria Football Federation) Enugu Rangers

== Sudan ==
Coach: Ibrahim Kabir and (Socialist Federal Republic of Yugoslavia) Ivan Yanko

No.	Pos.	Player	Date of birth (age)	Caps	Goals	Club
	GK	Altayeb Sanad	1950			(Sudan Football Association) Al-Merrikh SC
	MF	Awad Koka	1 January 1947 (aged 29)			(Sudan Football Association) Al-Hilal Club
	DF	Aljaili Abdelkheir	1 January 1956 (aged 20)			(Sudan Football Association) Al-Merrikh SC
	DF	Fozi el-Mardi	4 April 1953 (aged 22)			(Sudan Football Association) Al-Hilal Club
	DF	Khedr Al-Kori				(Sudan Football Association) Al-Hilal Club
	DF	Negm El-Din Hassan	1945			(United Arab Emirates Football Association) Sharjah
	DF	Abdelmunaem Al-Sayad				(Sudan Football Association) Al-Mourada SC
	DF	Hafez Ebid	1954			(Sudan Football Association) Al-Hilal Club
	FW	Muatasem Hamouri				(Sudan Football Association) Al-Merrikh SC
	DF	Abdallah Musa				(Sudan Football Association) Al-Hilal Club
	MF	Ammar Khaled	21 October 1955 (aged 20)			(Sudan Football Association) Al-Merrikh SC
	MF	Hassan Aldaw				
	FW	Alfadel Santo				(United Arab Emirates Football Association) Al-Nasr SC
	DF	Mahjoub Al-Dab				(Sudan Football Association) Al-Hilal Club
	FW	Ali Gagarin (Captain)	1 April 1949 (aged 26)			(Sudan Football Association) Al-Hilal Club
	MF	Bushara Abdel-Nadief	1947			(Sudan Football Association) Al-Merrikh SC
	MF	Kamal Abdelwahab				(Sudan Football Association) Al-Merrikh SC

== Zaire ==
Coach: (Romania) Ștefan Stănculescu

No.	Pos.	Player	Date of birth (age)	Caps	Goals	Club
	GK	Sombo Mateta				(Congolese Association Football Federation)
	GK	Mbuya Mpaka				(Congolese Association Football Federation)
	DF	Bwanga Tshimen	4 January 1949 (aged 27)			(Congolese Association Football Federation) TP Mazembe
	DF	Lobilo Boba	10 April 1950 (aged 25)			(Congolese Association Football Federation) AS Vita Club
	DF	Mboko Binda				(Congolese Association Football Federation)
	DF	Mwape Mialo	30 December 1951 (aged 24)			(Congolese Association Football Federation) Nyiki
	MF	Kidumu Mantantu	17 November 1946 (aged 29)			(Congolese Association Football Federation) CS Imana
	MF	Kilasu Massamba	24 November 1948 (aged 27)			(Congolese Association Football Federation) CS Imana
	MF	Masengo Ilunga	12 June 1957 (aged 18)			(Congolese Association Football Federation) TP Mazembe
	MF	Kembo Uba Kembo	27 December 1947 (aged 28)			(Congolese Association Football Federation) AS Vita Club
	FW	Ekofa Mbungu	24 November 1948 (aged 27)			(Congolese Association Football Federation) CS Imana
	FW	Ndaye Mulamba	4 November 1948 (aged 27)			(Congolese Association Football Federation) AS Vita Club
	FW	Kakoko Etepé	22 November 1950 (aged 25)			(Congolese Association Football Federation) CS Imana
	MF	Aaron Babayila				(Congolese Association Football Federation)
	DF	Kabasu Babo	4 March 1950 (aged 25)			(Congolese Association Football Federation) AS Bilima
	DF	Mwanza Mukombo	17 December 1945 (aged 30)			(Congolese Association Football Federation) TP Mazembe
	FW	Malongo Kassamba				(Congolese Association Football Federation)
