= Guinea v Morocco (1976 African Cup of Nations) =

1976 African Cup of Nations – Final Round
- Event: 1976 African Cup of Nations
Guinea	Morocco
(Guinea)	(Morocco)
1	1
- Date: 14 March 1976
- Venue: Addis Ababa Stadium, Addis Ababa
- Referee: Nyirenda Chayu (Zambia)
- Attendance: 30,000

Guinea v Morocco was the decisive match of group stage at the 1976 African Cup of Nations. The match was played at the Addis Ababa Stadium in Addis Ababa, Ethiopia, on 14 March 1976. Unlike most other Africa Cup of Nations, the 1976 winner was determined by a final group stage, with the final four teams playing in round-robin format, instead of a knockout stage. This was the last edition to feature a final group stage, while previously only the 1959 African Cup of Nations had also promoted this format.

Each team had defeated Egypt, while Morocco had also beaten Nigeria whereas Guinea had drawn against that same opponent. The point difference was in favor of Morocco, who was a single point clear off Guinea. Therefore, Guinea needed to win the last match to claim the title of champions of Africa; any other result would have Morocco take the title for the first time.

The match ended in a 1−1 draw with Morocco scoring a late equaliser, meaning the North Africans kept the first place in the group and won the title.

== Background ==
Standings before the final match
Team	Pld	W	D	L	GF	GA	GD	Pts
Morocco	2	2	0	0	4	2	+2	4
Guinea	2	1	1	0	5	3	+2	3
Nigeria	2	0	1	1	2	3	–1	1
Egypt	2	0	0	2	3	6	–3	0

In the 1976 African Cup of Nations, the eight qualified teams played in two groups of four, with the best two in each group qualifying for the final round-robin group.

Guinea had won group A with Egypt being runners-up. They had played each other in a 1–1 draw in their match with Guinea later beating Ethiopia and Uganda in their final two matches by the same 2–1 score. Egypt won 2–1 against Uganda and tied 1–1 with Ethiopia in the last group match.

Morocco won their group while Nigeria finished runners-up. Morocco tied 2–2 against Sudan in their first match and later won 1–0 against Zaire. Nigeria had won 4–2 against Zaire and 1–0 against Sudan. By the final group match Nigeria had a one point advantage over Morocco as both teams occupied the first two group B spots, however, the Moroccans beat Nigeria 3–1 and they swapped places.

In the first matches of the final round Morocco beat Egypt 2–1 while Guinea and Nigeria tied their match 1–1. The second matches was a repeat as all teams had played in the previous round. Morocco again beat Nigeria, this time 2–1, and Guinea won their match against Egypt 4–2. By the third and final matches of the tournament only Morocco and Guinea had a chance to win the game. The Moroccans had a one point advantage, meaning Guinea had to win the match in order to win the championship.

== Match ==
=== Match details ===
14 March 1976

Guinea	1–1	Morocco
Souleymane 33'	Report	Makrouh 86'

Addis Ababa Stadium, Addis Ababa
Attendance: 30,000
Referee: Nyirenda Chayu (Zambia)

Guinea	Morocco

GK	Abdoulaye Sylla
RB	Jacob Bangoura
LB	Djibril Diarra
DM	Papa Camara
RM	Youssuf Jansky
CM	Chérif Souleymane
LM	Bengally Sylla	Substituted off
AM	Ismail Sylla
RW	N'Jo Léa
CF	Petit Sory
LW	Morciré Sylla
Substitutes:
FW	Mory Koné	Substituted on
Manager:
(Romania) Petre Moldoveanu

GK	Mohammed Hazzaz
RB	Larbi Aherdane		(substituted off) 74'
CB	Brahim Glaoua
CB	Chérif Fetoui
AM	Abdallah Semmat	Sent off (straight red)
DM	Ahmed Abouali		(substituted off) 75'
CM	Ahmed Makrouh
CF	Abdelâali Zahraoui
RF	Abdallah Tazi
LB	Larbi Chebbak
LF	Ahmed Faras
Substitutes:
MF	Abdelmajid Dolmy		(substituted on) 74'
FW	Redouane El Guezzar		(substituted on) 75'
Manager:
(Romania) Virgil Mărdărescu

== Aftermath ==
Pos	Team	Pld	W	D	L	GF	GA	GD	Pts	Result
1	Morocco	3	2	1	0	5	3	+2	5	Champions
2	Guinea	3	1	2	0	6	4	+2	4	
3	Nigeria	3	1	1	1	5	5	0	3	
4	Egypt	3	0	0	3	5	9	−4	0	

Rules for classification: Group stage tiebreakers
