= Morocco at the Africa Cup of Nations =

Morocco has participated in the Africa Cup of Nations (AFCON) 20 times, where they have won two championships.

Morocco began its participation in AFCON much later than other North African states, but quickly emerged as one of its strongest contenders. They made their debut in the 1972 African Cup of Nations, and shortly thereafter became the second North African side to win the AFCON in the 1976 tournament. Since then, they have appeared in the finals in 2004, where they were runners-up to Tunisia, and in 2025, which they won after opposing side Senegal was ruled to have forfeited the match.

Morocco had been scheduled to host the 2015 Africa Cup of Nations, but controversially withdrew over fears of an ebola outbreak, causing their team to be disqualified from that year's tournament. They then hosted and became the champions of the 2025 tournament in a highly disputed and controversial final, which saw the Moroccans lose 1–0 at home to Senegal before handed a 3–0 victory by CAF Appeals Board two months later, Due to the latter's withdrawal.

== Overall record ==
Africa Cup of Nations record									Africa Cup of Nations qualification record					
Year	Round	Position	Pld	W	D	L	GF	GA	Pld	W	D	L	GF	GA
(Sudan) 1957	Did not enter								Did not enter					
(United Arab Republic) 1959	Did not enter								Did not enter					
(Ethiopia) 1962	Withdrew								Withdrew					
(Ghana) 1963	Did not qualify								2	1	0	1	5	6
(Tunisia) 1965	Did not enter								Did not enter					
(Ethiopia) 1968	Did not enter								Did not enter					
(Sudan) 1970	Did not qualify								2	1	0	1	1	2
(Cameroon) 1972	Group stage	5th	3	0	3	0	3	3	4	2	0	2	9	6
(Egypt) 1974	Did not enter								Did not enter					
(Ethiopia) 1976	Champions	1st	6	4	2	0	11	6	6	4	0	2	13	4
(Ghana) 1978	Group stage	6th	3	1	1	1	2	4	Qualified as defending champions					
(Nigeria) 1980	Third place	3rd	5	2	1	2	4	3	4	2	1	1	14	5
(Libya) 1982	Did not qualify								4	3	0	1	8	4
(Ivory Coast) 1984	Did not qualify								4	1	2	1	4	2
(Egypt) 1986	Fourth place	4th	5	1	2	2	4	5	2	1	1	0	1	0
(Morocco) 1988	Fourth place	4th	5	1	3	1	3	3	Qualified as hosts					
(Algeria) 1990	Did not qualify								2	0	2	0	1	1
(Senegal) 1992	Group stage	9th	2	0	1	1	1	2	6	4	0	2	11	4
(Tunisia) 1994	Did not qualify								6	2	2	2	5	4
(South Africa) 1996	Did not qualify								4	1	1	2	2	4
(Burkina Faso) 1998	Quarter-finals	6th	4	2	1	1	6	3	6	4	2	0	10	1
(Ghana) (Nigeria) 2000	Group stage	11th	3	1	1	1	1	2	4	2	2	0	6	4
(Mali) 2002	Group stage	9th	3	1	1	1	3	4	6	3	1	2	5	4
(Tunisia) 2004	Runners-up	2nd	6	4	1	1	14	4	6	5	1	0	10	0
(Egypt) 2006	Group stage	13th	3	0	2	1	0	1	10	5	5	0	17	7
(Ghana) 2008	Group stage	11th	3	1	0	2	7	6	4	3	1	0	6	1
(Angola) 2010	Did not qualify								10	3	3	4	14	13
(Equatorial Guinea) (Gabon) 2012	Group stage	12th	3	1	0	2	4	5	6	3	2	1	8	2
(South Africa) 2013	Group stage	10th	3	0	3	0	3	3	2	1	0	1	4	2
(Equatorial Guinea) 2015	Disqualified								Originally qualified as hosts, then disqualified					
(Gabon) 2017	Quarter-finals	7th	4	2	0	2	4	3	6	5	1	0	10	1
(Egypt) 2019	Round of 16	9th	4	3	1	0	4	1	6	3	2	1	8	3
(Cameroon) 2021	Quarter-finals	5th	5	3	1	1	8	5	6	4	2	0	10	1
(Ivory Coast) 2023	Round of 16	11th	4	2	1	1	5	3	4	3	0	1	8	3
(Morocco) 2025	Champions	1st	7	5	2	0	12	1	6	6	0	0	26	2
(Kenya) (Tanzania) (Uganda) 2027	To be determined								To be determined					
Total	2 Titles	20/35	81	34	27	20	99	67	128	72	31	25	216	86

== By match ==
- – Win
- – Draw
- – Loss

AFCON tournament	Round	Date	Opponent	Score	Morocco scorers
(Cameroon) 1972	Group stage	25 February 1972	Congo	1–1	Faras
(Cameroon) 1972	Group stage	27 February 1972	Sudan	1–1	Faras
(Cameroon) 1972	Group stage	29 February 1972	Zaire	1–1	Faras
(Ethiopia) 1976	Group stage	1 March 1976	Sudan	2–2	Fetoui, Abouali
(Ethiopia) 1976	Group stage	4 March 1976	Zaire	1–0	Zahraoui
(Ethiopia) 1976	Group stage	6 March 1976	Nigeria	3–1	Faras, Tazi, Chebbak
(Ethiopia) 1976	Final round	9 March 1976	Egypt	2–1	Faras, Zahraoui
(Ethiopia) 1976	Final round	11 March 1976	Nigeria	2–1	Faras, Guezzar
(Ethiopia) 1976	Final round	14 March 1976	Guinea	1–1	Makrouh
(Ghana) 1978	Group stage	6 March 1978	Tunisia	1–1	Amcharrat
(Ghana) 1978	Group stage	9 March 1978	Congo	1–0	Amcharrat
(Ghana) 1978	Group stage	11 March 1978	Uganda	0–3	—
(Nigeria) 1980	Group stage	9 March 1980	Guinea	1–1	Tahiri
(Nigeria) 1980	Group stage	13 March 1980	Algeria	0–1	—
(Nigeria) 1980	Group stage	16 March 1980	Ghana	1–0	Labied
(Nigeria) 1980	Semi-finals	19 March 1980	Nigeria	0–1	—
(Nigeria) 1980	Third place	21 March 1980	Egypt	2–0	Labied (2)
(Egypt) 1986	Group stage	8 March 1986	Algeria	0–0	—
(Egypt) 1986	Group stage	11 March 1986	Cameroon	1–1	Merry
(Egypt) 1986	Group stage	14 March 1986	Zambia	1–0	Chilengi (o.g.)
(Egypt) 1986	Semi-finals	17 March 1986	Egypt	0–1	—
(Egypt) 1986	Third place	20 March 1986	Ivory Coast	2–3	Rhiati, Sahil
(Morocco) 1988	Group stage	13 March 1988	Zaire	1–1	Merry (p)
(Morocco) 1988	Group stage	16 March 1988	Algeria	1–0	El Haddaoui
(Morocco) 1988	Group stage	19 March 1988	Ivory Coast	0–0	—
(Morocco) 1988	Semi-finals	23 March 1988	Cameroon	0–1	—
(Morocco) 1988	Third place	23 March 1988	Algeria	1–1 (a.e.t.) (3–4 p)	Nader
(Senegal) 1992	Group stage	12 January 1992	Cameroon	0–1	—
(Senegal) 1992	Group stage	14 January 1992	Zaire	1–1	Rokbi
(Burkina Faso) 1998	Group stage	9 February 1998	Zambia	1–1	Bahja
(Burkina Faso) 1998	Group stage	13 January 1998	Mozambique	3–0	Chiba, Elkhattabi, Fertout
(Burkina Faso) 1998	Group stage	17 January 1998	Egypt	1–0	Hadji
(Burkina Faso) 1998	Quarter-finals	22 January 1998	South Africa	1–2	Chiba
(Ghana) (Nigeria) 2000	Group stage	25 January 2000	Congo	1–0	Bassir
(Ghana) (Nigeria) 2000	Group stage	29 January 2000	Tunisia	0–0	—
(Ghana) (Nigeria) 2000	Group stage	3 February 2000	Nigeria	0–2	—
(Mali) 2002	Group stage	21 January 2002	Ghana	0–0	—
(Mali) 2002	Group stage	26 January 2002	Burkina Faso	2–1	Zerouali (2)
(Mali) 2002	Group stage	30 January 2002	South Africa	1–3	Benmahmoud (p)
(Tunisia) 2004	Group stage	27 January 2004	Nigeria	1–0	Hadji
(Tunisia) 2004	Group stage	31 January 2004	Benin	4–0	Chamakh, Mokhtari, Ouaddou, El Karkouri
(Tunisia) 2004	Group stage	4 February 2004	South Africa	1–1	Safri (p)
(Tunisia) 2004	Quarter-finals	8 February 2004	Algeria	3–1 (a.e.t.)	Chamakh, Hadji, Zairi
(Tunisia) 2004	Semi-finals	11 February 2004	Mali	4–0	Mokhtari (2), Hadji, Baha
(Tunisia) 2004	Final	14 February 2004	Tunisia	1–2	Mokhtari
(Egypt) 2006	Group stage	20 January 2006	Ivory Coast	0–1	—
(Egypt) 2006	Group stage	24 January 2006	Egypt	0–0	—
(Egypt) 2006	Group stage	28 January 2006	Libya	0–0	—
(Ghana) 2008	Group stage	21 January 2008	Namibia	5–1	Alloudi (3), Sektioui, Zerka
(Ghana) 2008	Group stage	24 January 2008	Guinea	2–3	Aboucherouane, Ouaddou
(Ghana) 2008	Group stage	28 January 2008	Ghana	0–2	—
(Equatorial Guinea) (Gabon) 2012	Group stage	23 January 2012	Tunisia	1–2	Kharja
(Equatorial Guinea) (Gabon) 2012	Group stage	27 January 2012	Gabon	2–3	Kharja (2)
(Equatorial Guinea) (Gabon) 2012	Group stage	31 January 2012	Niger	1–0	Belhanda
(South Africa) 2013	Group stage	19 January 2013	Angola	0–0	—
(South Africa) 2013	Group stage	23 January 2013	Cape Verde	1–1	El-Arabi
(South Africa) 2013	Group stage	27 January 2013	South Africa	2–2	El Adoua, Hafidi
(Gabon) 2017	Group stage	16 January 2017	DR Congo	0–1	—
(Gabon) 2017	Group stage	20 January 2017	Togo	3–1	Bouhaddouz, Saïss, En-Nesyri
(Gabon) 2017	Group stage	24 January 2017	Ivory Coast	1–0	Alioui
(Gabon) 2017	Quarter-finals	29 January 2017	Egypt	0–1	—
(Egypt) 2019	Group stage	23 June 2019	Namibia	1–0	Keimuine (o.g.)
(Egypt) 2019	Group stage	28 June 2019	Ivory Coast	1–0	En-Nesyri
(Egypt) 2019	Group stage	1 July 2019	South Africa	1–0	Boussoufa
(Egypt) 2019	Round of 16	5 July 2019	Benin	1–1 (a.e.t.) (1–4 p)	En-Nesyri
(Cameroon) 2021	Group stage	10 January 2022	Ghana	1–0	Boufal
(Cameroon) 2021	Group stage	14 January 2022	Comoros	2–0	Amallah, Aboukhlal
(Cameroon) 2021	Group stage	18 January 2022	Gabon	2–2	Boufal (p), Hakimi
(Cameroon) 2021	Round of 16	25 January 2022	Malawi	2–1	En-Nesyri, Hakimi
(Cameroon) 2021	Quarter-finals	30 January 2022	Egypt	1–2 (a.e.t.)	Boufal (p)
(Ivory Coast) 2023	Group stage	17 January 2024	Tanzania	3–0	Saïss, Ounahi, En-Nesyri
(Ivory Coast) 2023	Group stage	21 January 2024	DR Congo	1–1	Hakimi
(Ivory Coast) 2023	Group stage	24 January 2024	Zambia	1–0	Ziyech
(Ivory Coast) 2023	Round of 16	30 January 2024	South Africa	0–2	—
(Morocco) 2025	Group stage	21 December 2025	Comoros	2–0	Brahim, El Kaabi
(Morocco) 2025	Group stage	26 December 2025	Mali	1–1	Brahim
(Morocco) 2025	Group stage	29 December 2025	Zambia	3–0	El Kaabi (2), Brahim
(Morocco) 2025	Round of 16	4 January 2026	Tanzania	1–0	Brahim
(Morocco) 2025	Quarter-finals	9 January 2026	Cameroon	2–0	Brahim, Saibari
(Morocco) 2025	Semi-finals	15 January 2026	Nigeria	0–0 (a.e.t.) (4–2 p)	—
(Morocco) 2025	Final	18 January 2026	Senegal	3–0 (awarded) (Note: Senegal was stripped from the title after it was determined that leaving the pitch resulted in a forfeit. The match originally ended 1–0 for Senegal after extra time.)	—

== Top goalscorers ==
Rank	Player	Goals	Years (goals)
1	Ahmed Faras	6	1972 (3), 1976 (3)
2	Youssef En-Nesyri	5	2017, 2019 (2), 2021, 2023
2	Brahim Díaz	5	2025 (5)
4	Youssef Mokhtari	4	2004 (4)
5	Khalid Labied	3	1980 (3)
5	Youssouf Hadji	3	2004 (3)
5	Soufiane Alloudi	3	2008 (3)
5	Houssine Kharja	3	2012 (3)
5	Sofiane Boufal	3	2021 (3)
5	Achraf Hakimi	3	2021 (2), 2023
5	Ayoub El Kaabi	3	2025 (3)

== Awards ==
=== AFCON Best Player ===
- 1976: Ahmed Faras

=== AFCON Top Scorer ===
- 1980: Khalid Labied (3 goals)
- 2004: Youssef Mokhtari (4 goals)
- 2012: Houssine Kharja (3 goals)
- 2025: Brahim Díaz (5 goals)

=== AFCON Best Goalkeeper ===
- 2025: Yassine Bounou

=== Team of the Tournament ===
- 1972: Allal Ben Kassou, Boujemaa Benkhrif
- 1976: Mohammed Al-Hazaz, Mustapha "Chérif" Fetoui, Ahmed Faras
- 1978: Mohammed Al-Hazaz, Larbi Ihardane
- 1988: Tijani El Maataoui, Aziz Bouderbala
- 1998: Noureddine Naybet
- 2004: Walid Regragui, Abdeslam Ouaddou, Youssouf Hadji
- 2012: Houssine Kharja (substitute)
- 2017: Mbark Boussoufa (substitute)
- 2021: Achraf Hakimi
- 2025: Yassine Bounou, Achraf Hakimi, Noussair Mazraoui, Brahim Díaz

== See also ==
- Morocco at the FIFA World Cup
