= African Footballer of the Year =

Award by the Confederation of African Football

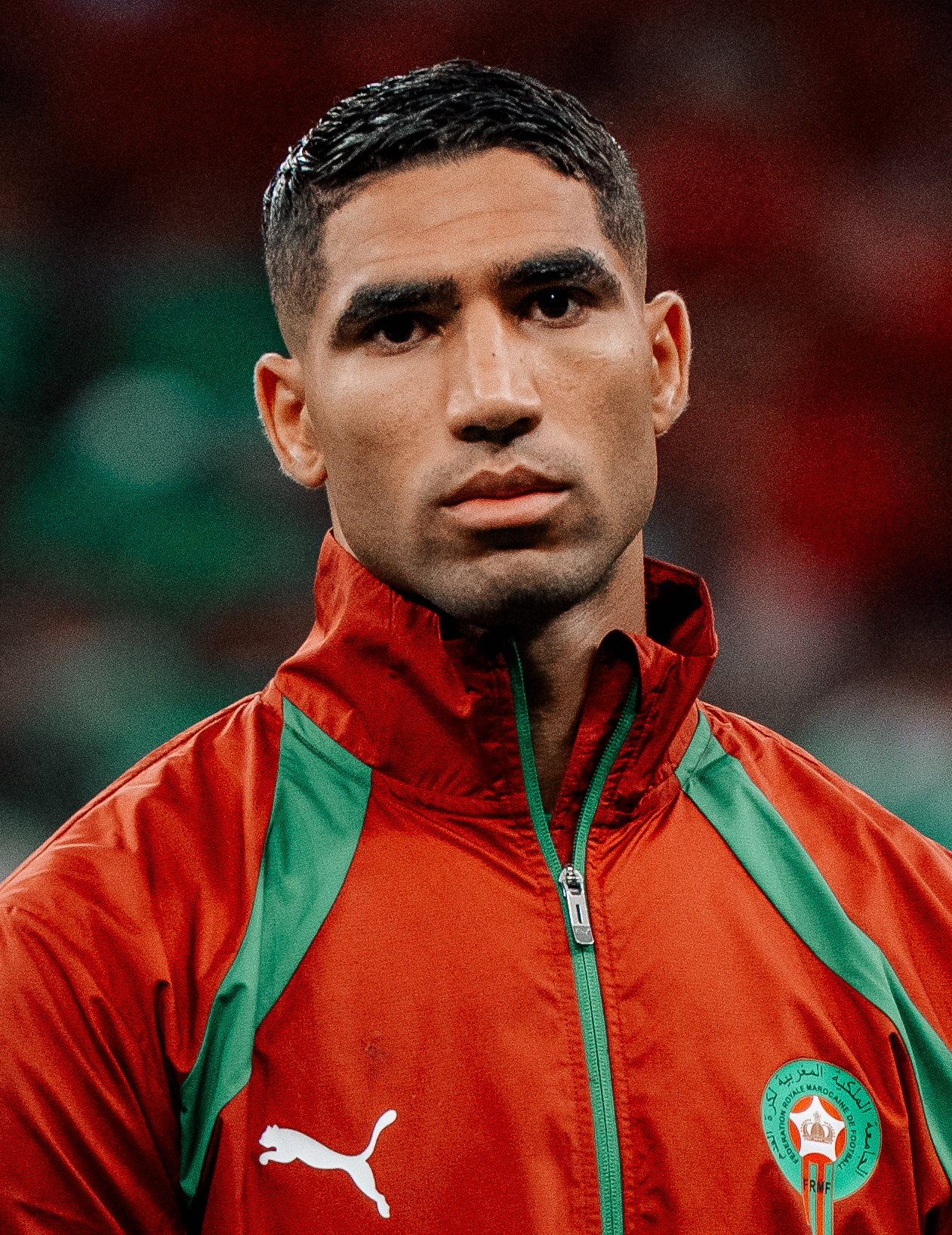
Achraf Hakimi is the latest winner, having received the award in 2025

The African Footballer of the Year award, presented annually to the best African footballer, has been conferred by the Confederation of African Football (CAF) since 1992. It has been included as part of the CAF Awards ceremony since 2000.

Samuel Eto'o and Yaya Touré have won the award the most times (four wins each). Two-time winner Didier Drogba is the player with the most runner-up appearances (four), most third place finishes (third), and most appearances in the top three (nine).

The France-born Frédéric Kanouté, Riyad Mahrez and Pierre-Emerick Aubameyang, England-born Ademola Lookman and Spain-born Achraf Hakimi are the only European-born players to win the award (both Kanouté and Aubameyang initially featured for France's U21 squad before going on to represent Mali and Gabon, respectively). The winner of the 2025 edition was Achraf Hakimi.

== History ==
The Year Golden Ball award was given out between 1970 and 1994 by France Football magazine. The changes resulted in parallel Golden Ball awards given out to Abedi Pele and George Weah in 1993 and 1994 by the magazine, although the CAF sponsored awards for those years were won respectively by Rashidi Yekini and Emmanuel Amuneke, as well as two awards given to Abedi Pele in 1992. France Football discontinued its award in 1995 after the European Ballon d'Or – also awarded by the magazine – had been opened to all players in the European leagues.

In 1991, the magazine Afrique Football installed an award. It was discontinued in 2003.

== Winners ==
=== France Football award (1970–1994) ===
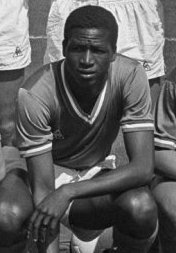
Salif Keita, the first player to win the award in 1970

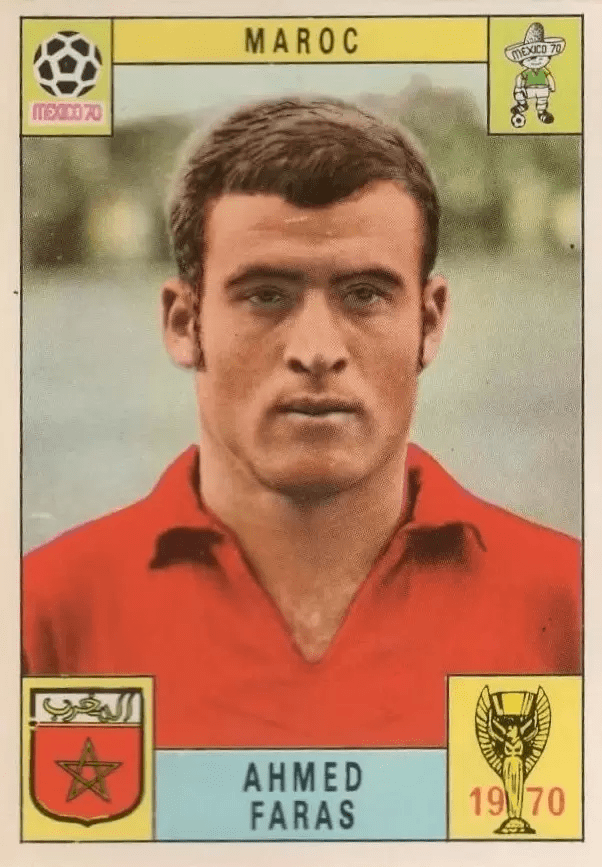
Ahmed Faras was the first player from Morocco to win the award in 1975

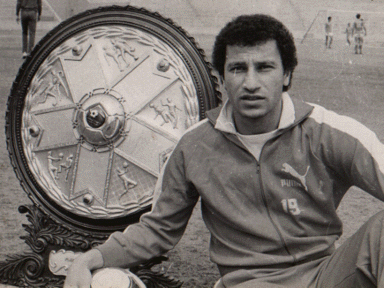
Mahmoud El Khatib was the first player from Egypt to win the award in 1983

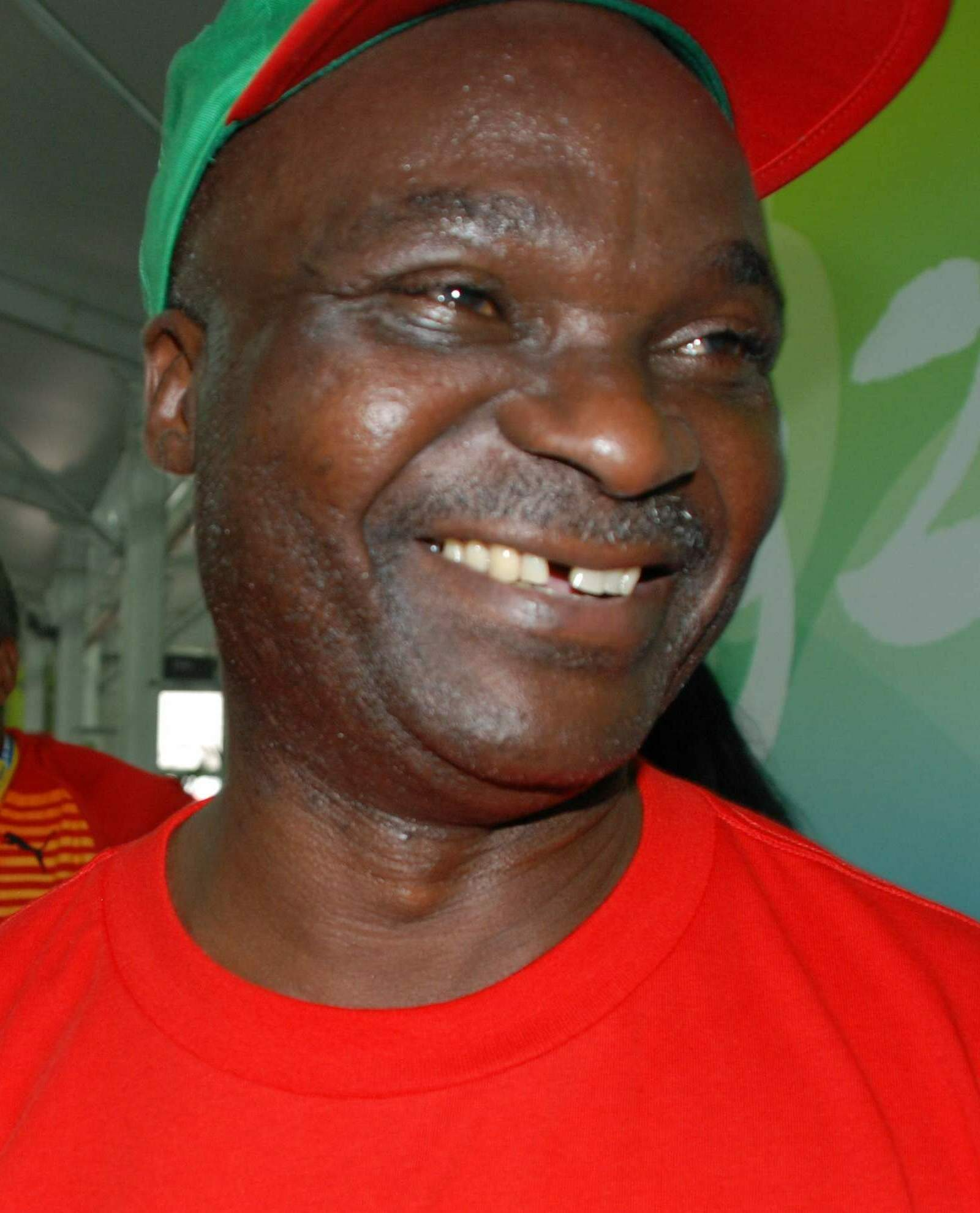
Roger Milla, two-time winner of the award given by France Football

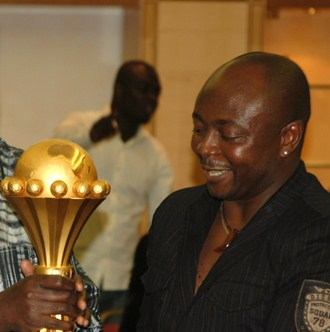
Abedi Pele, won the award three consecutive times from 1991-1993 and also won both France Football award and new CAF award in 1992

The award by France Football magazine of non-European nationality, the award being given to George Weah that year. It had already been replaced by an official award given out by the Confederation of African Football since 1992.

| Year | Rank | Player | Team | Points |
|---|---|---|---|---|
| 1970 | 1st | (Mali) Salif Keïta | (France) Saint-Étienne | 54 |
| 1970 | 2nd | (Ivory Coast) Laurent Pokou | (Ivory Coast) ASEC Abidjan | 28 |
| 1970 | 3rd | (Egypt) Ali Abo Greisha | (Egypt) Ismaily | 28 |
| 1971 | 1st | (Ghana) Ibrahim Sunday | (Ghana) Asante Kotoko | 29 |
| 1971 | 2nd | (Ghana) Robert Mensah | (Ghana) Asante Kotoko | 15 |
| 1971 | 3rd | (Cameroon) François Ndoumbé | (Cameroon) Canon Yaoundé | 13 |
| 1972 | 1st | (Guinea) Chérif Souleymane | (Guinea) Hafia | 21 |
| 1972 | 2nd | (Zaire) Bwanga Tshimen | (Zaire) TP Mazembe | 16 |
| 1972 | 3rd | (Guinea) Petit Sory | (Guinea) Hafia | 14 |
| 1973 | 1st | (Zaire) Bwanga Tshimen | (Zaire) TP Mazembe | 49 |
| 1973 | 2nd | (Zaire) Kazadi Mwamba | (Zaire) TP Mazembe | 44 |
| 1973 | 3rd | (Ivory Coast) Laurent Pokou | (Ivory Coast) ASEC Abidjan | 41 |
| 1974 | 1st | (Republic of the Congo) Paul Moukila | (Republic of the Congo) CARA Brazzaville | 57 |
| 1974 | 2nd | (Zaire) Lobilo Boba | (Zaire) Vita Club | 32 |
| 1974 | 3rd | (Egypt) Hassan Shehata | (Egypt) Zamalek | 28 |
| 1975 | 1st | (Morocco) Ahmed Faras | (Morocco) Mohammédia | 28 |
| 1975 | 2nd | (Cameroon) Roger Milla | (Cameroon) Tonnerre Yaoundé | 24 |
| 1975 | 2nd | (Guinea) Mamadou Aliou Kéïta | (Guinea) Hafia | 24 |
| 1976 | 1st | (Cameroon) Roger Milla | (Cameroon) Tonnerre Yaoundé | 33 |
| 1976 | 2nd | (Guinea) Papa Camara | (Guinea) Hafia | 32 |
| 1976 | 3rd | (Algeria) Ali Bencheikh | (Algeria) MC Alger | 27 |
| 1977 | 1st | (Tunisia) Tarak Dhiab | (Tunisia) Espérance Tunis | 45 |
| 1977 | 2nd | (Guinea) Papa Camara | (Guinea) Hafia | 33 |
| 1977 | 3rd | (Nigeria) Segun Odegbami | (Nigeria) Shooting Stars | 29 |
| 1978 | 1st | (Ghana) Karim Abdul Razak | (Ghana) Asante Kotoko | 58 |
| 1978 | 2nd | (Algeria) Ali Bencheikh | (Algeria) MC Alger | 33 |
| 1978 | 3rd | (Cameroon) Thomas N'Kono | (Cameroon) Canon Yaoundé | 29 |
| 1979 | 1st | (Cameroon) Thomas N'Kono | (Cameroon) Canon Yaoundé | 55 |
| 1979 | 2nd | (Ghana) Adolf Armah | (Ghana) Hearts of Oak | 23 |
| 1979 | 3rd | (Guinea) Kerfalla Bangoura | (Guinea) Horoya | 15 |
| 1980 | 1st | (Cameroon) Jean Manga-Onguéné | (Cameroon) Canon Yaoundé | 64 |
| 1980 | 2nd | (Nigeria) Segun Odegbami | (Nigeria) Shooting Stars | 41 |
| 1980 | 3rd | (Cameroon) Théophile Abega | (Cameroon) Canon Yaoundé | 18 |
| 1981 | 1st | (Algeria) Lakhdar Belloumi | (Algeria) GC Mascara | 78 |
| 1981 | 2nd | (Cameroon) Thomas N'Kono | (Cameroon) Canon Yaoundé | 54 |
| 1981 | 3rd | (Algeria) Ali Fergani | (Algeria) JS Kabylie | 26 |
| 1982 | 1st | (Cameroon) Thomas N'Kono | (Spain) Espanyol | 83 |
| 1982 | 2nd | (Algeria) Salah Assad | (France) Mulhouse | 54 |
| 1982 | 3rd | (Algeria) Lakhdar Belloumi | (Algeria) GC Mascara | 36 |
| 1983 | 1st | (Egypt) Mahmoud El Khatib | (Egypt) Al Ahly | 98 |
| 1983 | 2nd | (Ghana) Opoku Nti | (Ghana) Asante Kotoko | 89 |
| 1983 | 3rd | (Togo) Rafiou Moutairou | (Togo) OC Agaza | 19 |
| 1984 | 1st | (Cameroon) Théophile Abega | (France) Toulouse | 124 |
| 1984 | 2nd | (Cameroon) Joseph-Antoine Bell | (Egypt) Al Mokawloon Al Arab | 65 |
| 1984 | 2nd | (Egypt) Ibrahim Youssef | (Egypt) Zamalek | 65 |
| 1985 | 1st | (Morocco) Mohamed Timoumi | (Morocco) AS FAR | 113 |
| 1985 | 2nd | (Algeria) Rabah Madjer | (Portugal) Porto | 45 |
| 1985 | 3rd | (Egypt) Ibrahim Youssef | (Egypt) Zamalek | 39 |
| 1986 | 1st | (Morocco) Ezzaki Badou | (Spain) Mallorca | 125 |
| 1986 | 2nd | (Morocco) Aziz Bouderbala | (Switzerland) Sion | 88 |
| 1986 | 3rd | (Cameroon) Roger Milla | (France) Montpellier | 80 |
| 1987 | 1st | (Algeria) Rabah Madjer | (Portugal) Porto | 130 |
| 1987 | 2nd | (Ivory Coast) Youssouf Falikou Fofana | (France) Monaco | 63 |
| 1987 | 3rd | (Cameroon) François Omam-Biyik | (France) Laval | 52 |
| 1988 | 1st | (Zambia) Kalusha Bwalya | (Belgium) Cercle Brugge | 111 |
| 1988 | 2nd | (Cameroon) Roger Milla | (France) Montpellier | 68 |
| 1988 | 3rd | (Ivory Coast) Youssouf Falikou Fofana | (France) Monaco | 40 |
| 1989 | 1st | (Liberia) George Weah | (France) Monaco | 133 |
| 1989 | 2nd | (Cameroon) Joseph-Antoine Bell | (France) Bordeaux | 105 |
| 1989 | 3rd | (Zambia) Kalusha Bwalya | (Netherlands) PSV | 49 |
| 1990 | 1st | (Cameroon) Roger Milla | (Réunion) Saint-Pierroise | 209 |
| 1990 | 2nd | (Algeria) Tahar Chérif El-Ouazzani | (Turkey) Aydınspor | 64 |
| 1990 | 3rd | (Algeria) Rabah Madjer | (Portugal) Porto | 60 |
| 1990 | 3rd | (Cameroon) François Omam-Biyik | (France) Rennes | 60 |
| 1991 | 1st | (Ghana) Abedi Pele | (France) Marseille | 152 |
| 1991 | 2nd | (Liberia) George Weah | (France) Monaco | 106 |
| 1991 | 3rd | (Cameroon) François Omam-Biyik | (France) Cannes | 52 |
| 1992 | 1st | (Ghana) Abedi Pele | (France) Marseille | 198 |
| 1992 | 2nd | (Liberia) George Weah | (France) Paris Saint-Germain | 161 |
| 1992 | 3rd | (Ghana) Tony Yeboah | (Germany) Eintracht Frankfurt | 64 |
| 1993 | 1st | (Ghana) Abedi Pele | (France) Marseille | 119 |
| 1993 | 2nd | (Ghana) Tony Yeboah | (Germany) Eintracht Frankfurt | 117 |
| 1993 | 3rd | (Nigeria) Rashidi Yekini | (Portugal) Vitória de Setúbal | 104 |
| 1994 | 1st | (Liberia) George Weah | (France) Paris Saint-Germain | 148 |
| 1994 | 2nd | (Nigeria) Emmanuel Amunike | (Portugal) Sporting CP | 133 |
| 1994 | 3rd | (Nigeria) Daniel Amokachi | (England) Everton | 99 |

=== Afrique Football award (Etoile d'Or) (1991–2003) ===
| Year | Rank | Player | Team | Points |
|---|---|---|---|---|
| 1991 | 1st | (Ghana) Abedi Pele | (France) Marseille | 206 |
| 1991 | 2nd | (Liberia) George Weah | (France) Monaco | 146 |
| 1991 | 3rd | (Ghana) Nii Lamptey | (Belgium) Anderlecht | 68 |
| 1992 | 1st | (Ghana) Abedi Pele | (France) Marseille | 192 |
| 1992 | 2nd | (Liberia) George Weah | (France) Paris Saint-Germain | 167 |
| 1992 | 3rd | (Ivory Coast) Alain Gouaméné | (Morocco) Raja CA | 60 |
| 1993 | 1st | (Nigeria) Rashidi Yekini | (Portugal) Vitória de Setúbal | 152 |
| 1993 | 2nd | (Ghana) Abedi Pele | (France) Marseille | 118 |
| 1993 | 3rd | (Ghana) Tony Yeboah | (Germany) Eintracht Frankfurt | 98 |
| 1994 | 1st | (Nigeria) Emmanuel Amunike | (Portugal) Sporting CP | 178 |
| 1994 | 2nd | (Liberia) George Weah | (France) Paris Saint-Germain | 114 |
| 1994 | 3rd | (Nigeria) Daniel Amokachi | (England) Everton | 97 |
| 1995 | 1st | (Liberia) George Weah | (Italy) Milan | – |
| 1996 | 1st | (Nigeria) Nwankwo Kanu | (Italy) Internazionale | – |
| 1997 | 1st | (Nigeria) Victor Ikpeba | (France) Monaco | – |
| 1998 | 1st | (Morocco) Mustapha Hadji | (Spain) Deportivo La Coruña | – |
| 1998 | 2nd | (Nigeria) Jay-Jay Okocha | (France) Paris Saint-Germain | – |
| 1998 | 3rd | (Nigeria) Sunday Oliseh | (Netherlands) Ajax | – |
| 1999 | 1st | (Nigeria) Nwankwo Kanu | (England) Arsenal | – |
| 2000 | 1st | (Cameroon) Patrick Mboma | (Italy) Parma | – |
| 2001 | 1st | (Senegal) El Hadji Diouf | (France) Lens | – |
| 2002 | 1st | (Senegal) El Hadji Diouf | (England) Liverpool | 186 |
| 2002 | 2nd | (Senegal) Papa Bouba Diop | (France) Lens | 64 |
| 2002 | 3rd | (Cameroon) Samuel Eto'o | (Spain) Mallorca | 39 |
| 2003 | 1st | (Cameroon) Samuel Eto'o | (Spain) Mallorca | 169 |
| 2003 | 2nd | (Ivory Coast) Didier Drogba | (France) Marseille | 68 |
| 2003 | 3rd | (Nigeria) Jay-Jay Okocha | (England) Bolton Wanderers | 51 |

=== CAF award (1992–present) ===
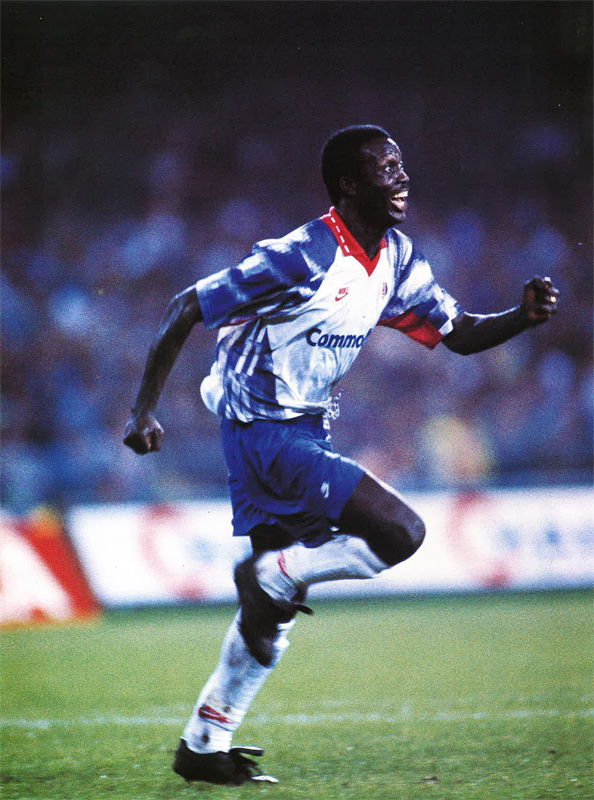
George Weah won the award in 1995 (the same year he was named FIFA World Player of the Year and also received the Ballon d'Or)

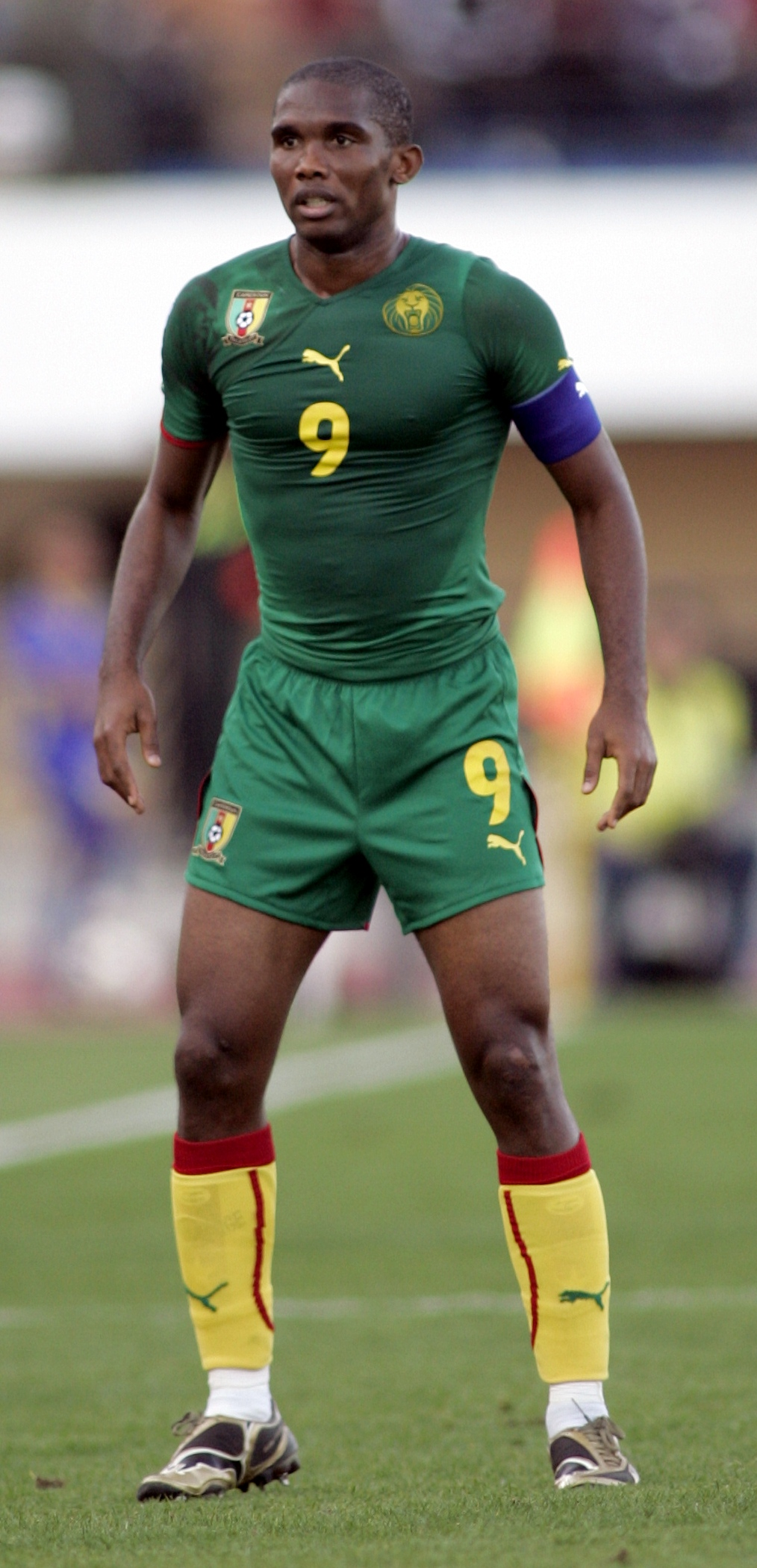
Samuel Eto'o won the award four times

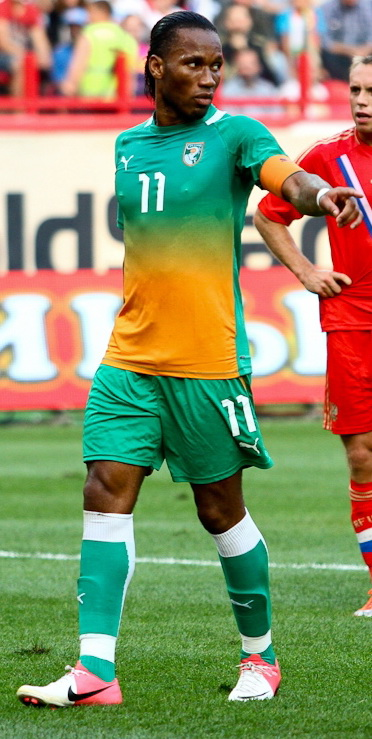
Didier Drogba was the first Ivorian to win the award in 2006

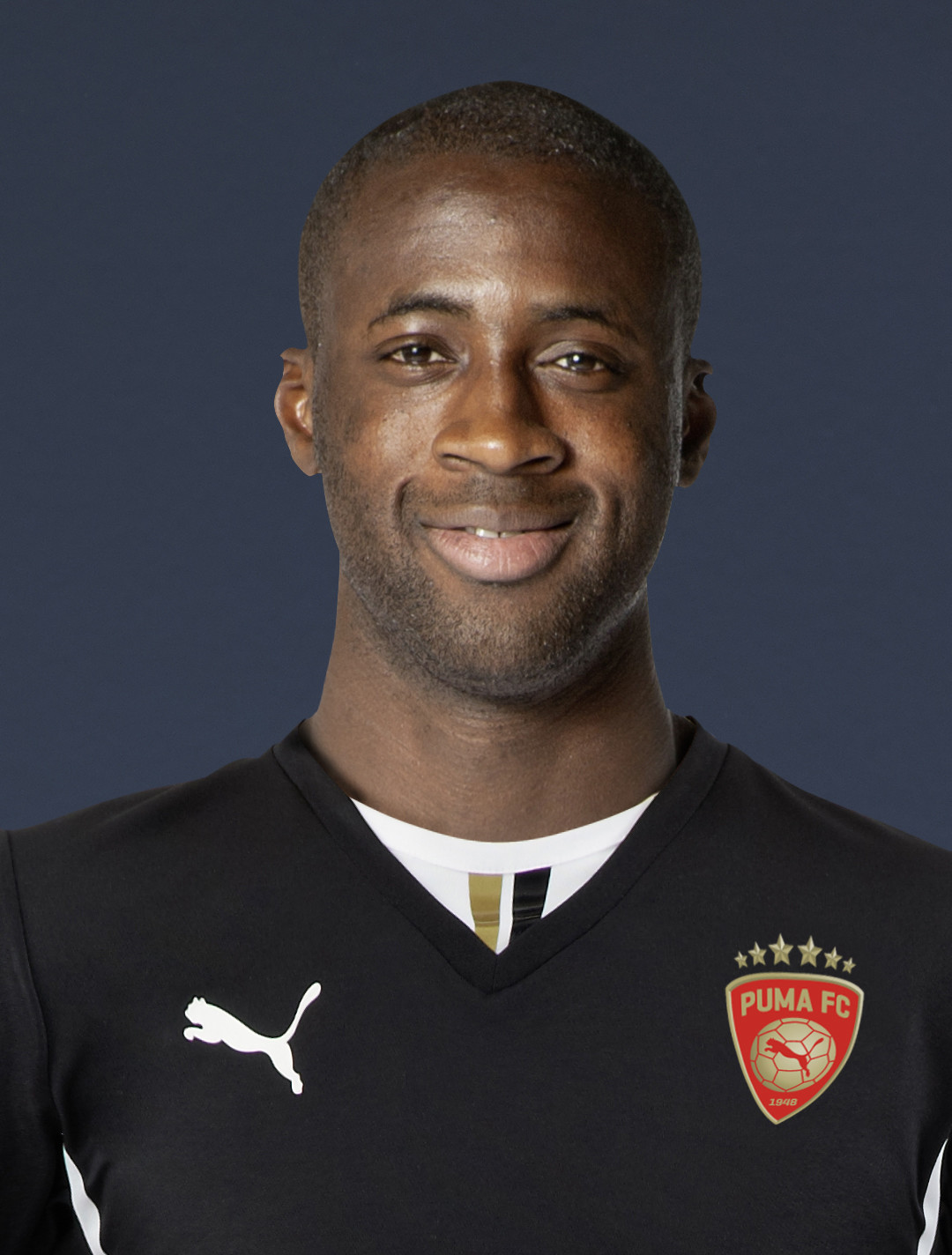
Yaya Touré won the award four consecutive times from 2011 to 2014

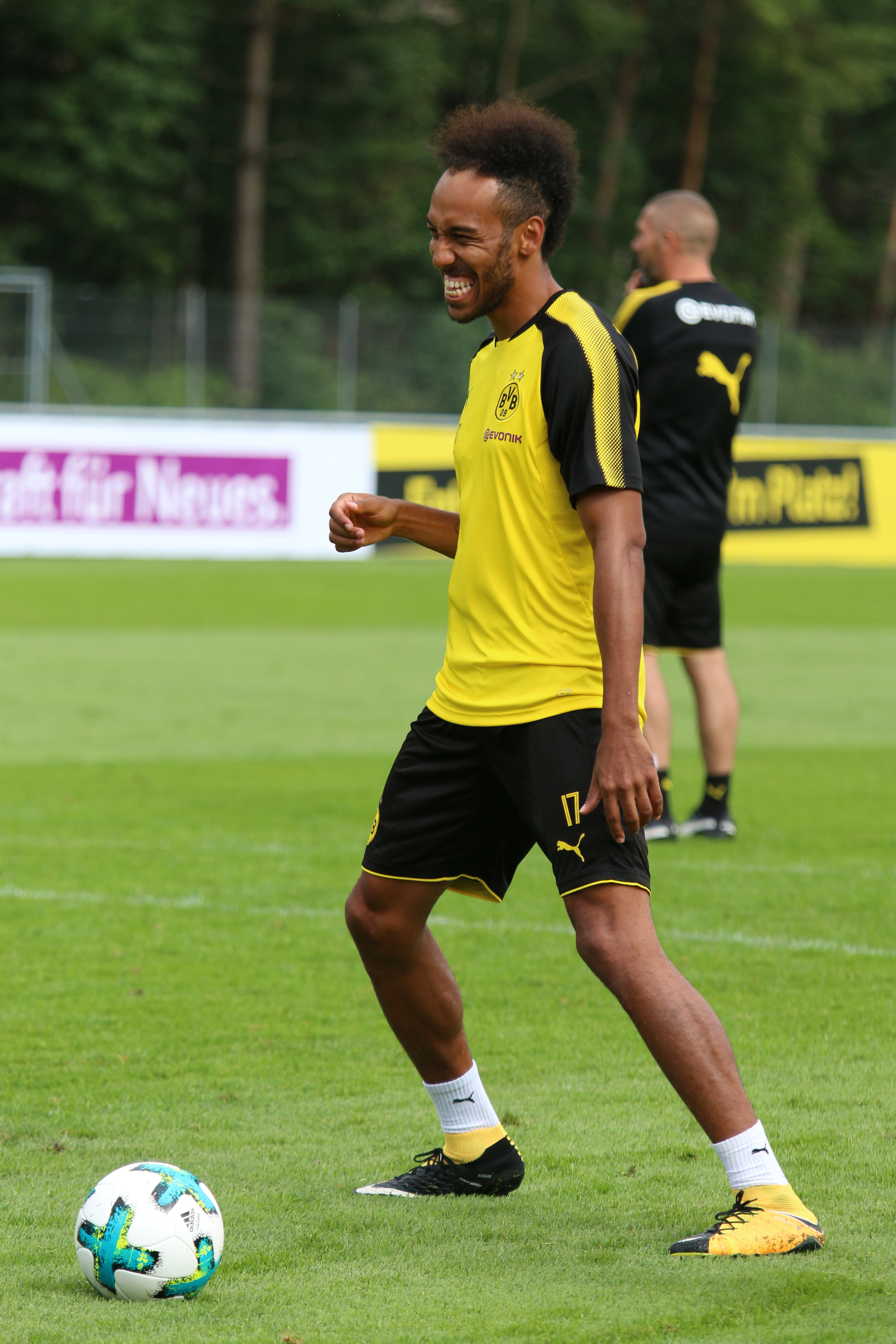
Pierre-Emerick Aubameyang was the first player from Gabon to win the award in 2015

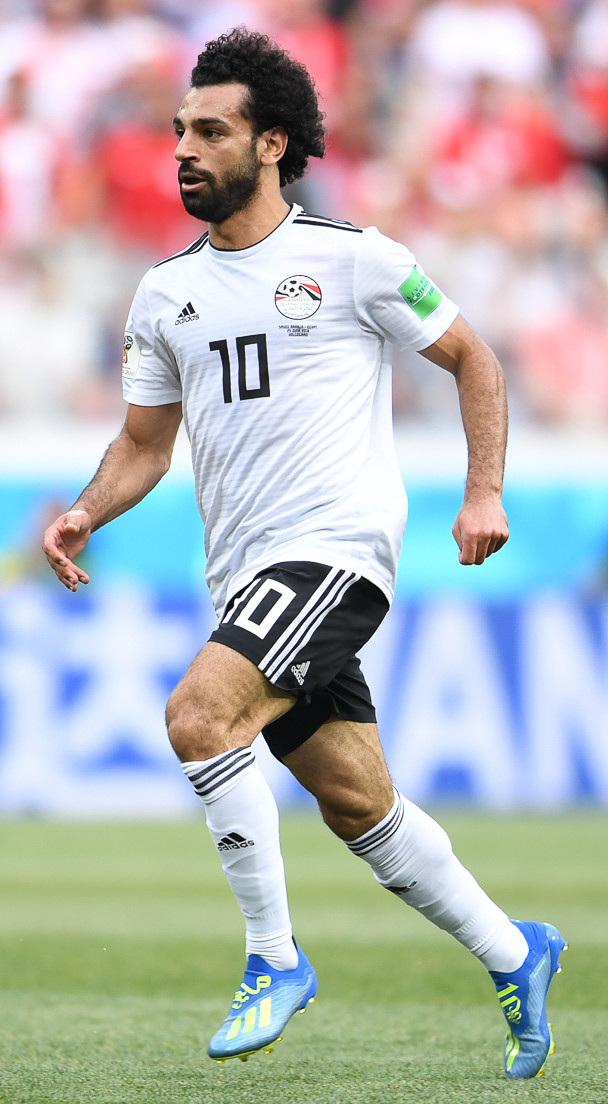
Mohamed Salah won the award twice in a row, in 2017 and 2018

| Year | Rank | Player | Team | Points |
|---|---|---|---|---|
| 1992 | 1st | (Ghana) Abedi Pele | (France) Marseille | – |
| 1993 | 1st | (Nigeria) Rashidi Yekini | (Portugal) Vitória de Setúbal | – |
| 1994 | 1st | (Nigeria) Emmanuel Amunike | (Portugal) Sporting CP | 48 |
| 1994 | 2nd | (Liberia) George Weah | (France) Paris Saint-Germain | 44 |
| 1994 | 2nd | (Nigeria) Rashidi Yekini | (Greece) Olympiacos | 44 |
| 1995 | 1st | (Liberia) George Weah | (Italy) Milan | – |
| 1995 | 2nd | (Nigeria) Emmanuel Amunike | (Portugal) Sporting CP | – |
| 1995 | 3rd | (Nigeria) Daniel Amokachi | (England) Everton | – |
| 1996 | 1st | (Nigeria) Nwankwo Kanu | (Italy) Internazionale | – |
| 1996 | 2nd | (Liberia) George Weah | (Italy) Milan | – |
| 1996 | 3rd | (Nigeria) Daniel Amokachi | (Turkey) Beşiktaş | – |
| 1997 | 1st | (Nigeria) Victor Ikpeba | (France) Monaco | 56 |
| 1997 | 2nd | (Chad) Japhet N'Doram | (France) Monaco | 40 |
| 1997 | 3rd | (Nigeria) Taribo West | (Italy) Internazionale | 35 |
| 1998 | 1st | (Morocco) Mustapha Hadji | (Spain) Deportivo La Coruña | 76 |
| 1998 | 2nd | (Nigeria) Jay-Jay Okocha | (France) Paris Saint-Germain | 74 |
| 1998 | 3rd | (Nigeria) Sunday Oliseh | (Netherlands) Ajax | 58 |
| 1999 | 1st | (Nigeria) Nwankwo Kanu | (England) Arsenal | 46 |
| 1999 | 2nd | (Ghana) Samuel Kuffour | (Germany) Bayern Munich | 44 |
| 1999 | 3rd | (Ivory Coast) Ibrahima Bakayoko | (France) Marseille | 42 |
| 2000 | 1st | (Cameroon) Patrick Mboma | (Italy) Parma | 123 |
| 2000 | 2nd | (Cameroon) Lauren | (Spain) Mallorca | 36 |
| 2000 | 3rd | (Cameroon) Samuel Eto'o | (Spain) Mallorca | 29 |
| 2001 | 1st | (Senegal) El Hadji Diouf | (France) Lens | 93 |
| 2001 | 2nd | (Ghana) Samuel Kuffour | (Germany) Bayern Munich | 66 |
| 2001 | 3rd | (Cameroon) Samuel Eto'o | (Spain) Mallorca | 34 |
| 2002 | 1st | (Senegal) El Hadji Diouf | (England) Liverpool | 93 |
| 2002 | 2nd | (Senegal) Papa Bouba Diop | (France) Lens | 46 |
| 2002 | 3rd | (Egypt) Ahmed Hossam Mido | (Netherlands) Ajax | 42 |
| 2003 | 1st | (Cameroon) Samuel Eto'o | (Spain) Mallorca | – |
| 2003 | 2nd | (Ivory Coast) Didier Drogba | (France) Marseille | – |
| 2003 | 3rd | (Nigeria) Jay-Jay Okocha | (England) Bolton Wanderers | – |
| 2004 | 1st | (Cameroon) Samuel Eto'o | (Spain) Barcelona | 116 |
| 2004 | 2nd | (Ivory Coast) Didier Drogba | (England) Chelsea | 90 |
| 2004 | 3rd | (Nigeria) Jay-Jay Okocha | (England) Bolton Wanderers | 68 |
| 2005 | 1st | (Cameroon) Samuel Eto'o | (Spain) Barcelona | 108 |
| 2005 | 2nd | (Ivory Coast) Didier Drogba | (England) Chelsea | 106 |
| 2005 | 3rd | (Ghana) Michael Essien | (England) Chelsea | 50 |
| 2006 | 1st | (Ivory Coast) Didier Drogba | (England) Chelsea | 79 |
| 2006 | 2nd | (Cameroon) Samuel Eto'o | (Spain) Barcelona | 76 |
| 2006 | 3rd | (Ghana) Michael Essien | (England) Chelsea | 36 |
| 2007 | 1st | (Mali) Frédéric Kanouté | (Spain) Sevilla | – |
| 2007 | 2nd | (Ghana) Michael Essien | (England) Chelsea | – |
| 2007 | 3rd | (Ivory Coast) Didier Drogba | (England) Chelsea | – |
| 2008 | 1st | (Togo) Emmanuel Adebayor | (England) Arsenal | 74 |
| 2008 | 2nd | (Egypt) Mohamed Abou Trika | (Egypt) Al Ahly | 53 |
| 2008 | 3rd | (Ghana) Michael Essien | (England) Chelsea | 36 |
| 2009 | 1st | (Ivory Coast) Didier Drogba | (England) Chelsea | 92 |
| 2009 | 2nd | (Cameroon) Samuel Eto'o | (Italy) Internazionale | 69 |
| 2009 | 3rd | (Ghana) Michael Essien | (England) Chelsea | 43 |
| 2010 | 1st | (Cameroon) Samuel Eto'o | (Italy) Internazionale | – |
| 2010 | 2nd | (Ghana) Asamoah Gyan | (England) Sunderland | – |
| 2010 | 3rd | (Ivory Coast) Didier Drogba | (England) Chelsea | – |
| 2011 | 1st | (Ivory Coast) Yaya Touré | (England) Manchester City | – |
| 2011 | 2nd | (Mali) Seydou Keita | (Spain) Barcelona | – |
| 2011 | 3rd | (Ghana) André Ayew | (France) Marseille | – |
| 2012 | 1st | (Ivory Coast) Yaya Touré | (England) Manchester City | – |
| 2012 | 2nd | (Ivory Coast) Didier Drogba | (China) Shanghai Shenhua | – |
| 2012 | 3rd | (Cameroon) Alex Song | (Spain) Barcelona | – |
| 2013 | 1st | (Ivory Coast) Yaya Touré | (England) Manchester City | 373 |
| 2013 | 2nd | (Nigeria) Mikel John Obi | (England) Chelsea | 265 |
| 2013 | 3rd | (Ivory Coast) Didier Drogba | (Turkey) Galatasaray | 236 |
| 2014 | 1st | (Ivory Coast) Yaya Touré | (England) Manchester City | 175 |
| 2014 | 2nd | (Gabon) Pierre-Emerick Aubameyang | (Germany) Borussia Dortmund | 120 |
| 2014 | 3rd | (Nigeria) Vincent Enyeama | (France) Lille | 105 |
| 2015 | 1st | (Gabon) Pierre-Emerick Aubameyang | (Germany) Borussia Dortmund | 143 |
| 2015 | 2nd | (Ivory Coast) Yaya Touré | (England) Manchester City | 136 |
| 2015 | 3rd | (Ghana) André Ayew | (Wales) Swansea City | 112 |
| 2016 | 1st | (Algeria) Riyad Mahrez | (England) Leicester City | 361 |
| 2016 | 2nd | (Gabon) Pierre-Emerick Aubameyang | (Germany) Borussia Dortmund | 313 |
| 2016 | 3rd | (Senegal) Sadio Mané | (England) Liverpool | 186 |
| 2017 | 1st | (Egypt) Mohamed Salah | (England) Liverpool | 625 |
| 2017 | 2nd | (Senegal) Sadio Mané | (England) Liverpool | 507 |
| 2017 | 3rd | (Gabon) Pierre-Emerick Aubameyang | (Germany) Borussia Dortmund | 311 |
| 2018 | 1st | (Egypt) Mohamed Salah | (England) Liverpool | 567 |
| 2018 | 2nd | (Senegal) Sadio Mané | (England) Liverpool | 440 |
| 2018 | 3rd | (Gabon) Pierre-Emerick Aubameyang | (England) Arsenal | 197 |
| 2019 | 1st | (Senegal) Sadio Mané | (England) Liverpool | 477 |
| 2019 | 2nd | (Egypt) Mohamed Salah | (England) Liverpool | 325 |
| 2019 | 3rd | (Algeria) Riyad Mahrez | (England) Manchester City | 267 |
| 2022 | 1st | (Senegal) Sadio Mané | (Germany) Bayern Munich | – |
| 2022 | 2nd | (Egypt) Mohamed Salah | (England) Liverpool | – |
| 2022 | 3rd | (Senegal) Édouard Mendy | (England) Chelsea | – |
| 2023 | 1st | (Nigeria) Victor Osimhen | (Italy) Napoli | – |
| 2023 | 2nd | (Morocco) Achraf Hakimi | (France) Paris Saint-Germain | – |
| 2023 | 3rd | (Egypt) Mohamed Salah | (England) Liverpool | – |
| 2024 | 1st | (Nigeria) Ademola Lookman | (Italy) Atalanta | – |
| 2024 | 2nd | (Morocco) Achraf Hakimi | (France) Paris Saint-Germain | – |
| 2024 | 3rd | (Guinea) Serhou Guirassy | (Germany) Borussia Dortmund | – |
| 2025 | 1st | (Morocco) Achraf Hakimi | (France) Paris Saint-Germain | 533 |
| 2025 | 2nd | (Egypt) Mohamed Salah | (England) Liverpool | 317 |
| 2025 | 3rd | (Nigeria) Victor Osimhen | (Turkey) Galatasaray | 240 |

== Multiple winners ==
^{* Players in bold are currently active}

| Player | Winner | Runner-up | Third place |
|---|---|---|---|
| (Cameroon) Samuel Eto'o | 4 | 2 | 2 |
| (Ivory Coast) Yaya Touré | 4 | 1 | 0 |
| (Liberia) George Weah | 3 | 4 | 0 |
| (Ghana) Abedi Pele | 3 | 0 | 0 |
| (Ivory Coast) Didier Drogba | 2 | 4 | 3 |
| (Egypt) **Mohamed Salah** | 2 | 3 | 1 |
| (Cameroon) Roger Milla | 2 | 2 | 1 |
| (Senegal) **Sadio Mané** | 2 | 2 | 1 |
| (Cameroon) Thomas N'Kono | 2 | 1 | 1 |
| (Nigeria) Nwankwo Kanu | 2 | 0 | 0 |
| (Senegal) El Hadji Diouf | 2 | 0 | 0 |

== Awards won by nationality ==
| Nation | Winners | Runners-up | Third places |
|---|---|---|---|
| Cameroon | 11 | 8 | 10 |
| Nigeria | 7 | 6 | 10 |
| Ghana | 6 | 8 | 7 |
| Ivory Coast | 6 | 7 | 6 |
| Morocco | 5 | 3 | 0 |
| Senegal | 4 | 3 | 2 |
| Algeria | 3 | 4 | 5 |
| Egypt | 3 | 5 | 5 |
| Liberia | 3 | 4 | 0 |
| Mali | 2 | 1 | 0 |
| Guinea | 1 | 3 | 3 |
| DR Congo | 1 | 3 | 0 |
| Gabon | 1 | 2 | 2 |
| Togo | 1 | 0 | 1 |
| Zambia | 1 | 0 | 1 |
| Congo | 1 | 0 | 0 |
| Tunisia | 1 | 0 | 0 |
| Chad | 0 | 1 | 0 |

== Awards won by club ==
| Club | Winners | Runners-up | Third places | Players | | |
| Club | Winners | Runners-up | Third places | Winners | Runner-ups | Third places |
|---|---|---|---|---|---|---|
| (England) Liverpool | 4 | 4 | 2 | M. Salah (2), H. Diouf, S. Mané | S. Mané (2), M. Salah (2) | S. Mané, M. Salah |
| (England) Manchester City | 4 | 1 | 1 | Y. Touré (4) | Y. Touré | R. Mahrez |
| (France) Marseille | 3 | 1 | 2 | Abedi Pele (3) | D. Drogba | I. Bakayoko, A. Ayew |
| (England) Chelsea | 2 | 4 | 6 | D. Drogba (2) | D. Drogba (2), M. Essien, M. J. Obi | M. Essien (4), D. Drogba (2) |
| (France) Paris Saint-Germain | 2 | 4 | – | G. Weah, A. Hakimi | G. Weah, A. Okocha, A. Hakimi (2) | |
| (France) Monaco | 2 | 3 | 1 | G. Weah, V. Ikpeba | Y. Fofana, G. Weah, J. N'Doram | Y. Fofana |
| (Spain) Barcelona | 2 | 2 | 1 | S. Eto'o (2) | S. Eto'o, Se. Keita | A. Song |
| (Ghana) Asante Kotoko | 2 | 2 | – | K. Abdul Razak, I. Sunday | R. Mensah, O. Nti | |
| (Cameroon) Canon Yaoundé | 2 | 1 | 3 | J. Manga-Onguéné, T. N'Kono | T. N'Kono | T. Abega, F. Ndoumbé, T. N'Kono |
| (Spain) Mallorca | 2 | 1 | 2 | E. Badou, S. Eto'o | Lauren | S. Eto'o (2) |
| (Italy) Internazionale | 2 | 1 | 1 | S. Eto'o, N. Kanu | S. Eto'o | T. West |
| (England) Arsenal | 2 | – | 1 | E. Adebayor, N. Kanu | | P. E. Aubameyang |
| (Guinea) Hafia | 1 | 2 | 2 | C. Souleymane | P. Camara (2) | P. Sory, M. A. Kéïta |
| (Germany) Borussia Dortmund | 1 | 2 | 2 | P. E. Aubameyang | P. E. Aubameyang (2) | P. E. Aubameyang, S. Guirassy |
| (Germany) Bayern Munich | 1 | 2 | – | S. Mané | S. Kuffour (2) | |
| (Democratic Republic of the Congo) TP Mazembe | 1 | 2 | – | B. Tshimen | B. Tshimen, K. Mwamba | |
| (Portugal) Porto | 1 | 1 | 1 | R. Madjer | R. Madjer | R. Madjer |
| (Egypt) Al Ahly | 1 | 1 | 0 | M. El Khatib | M. Abou Trika | |
| (Cameroon) Tonnerre Yaoundé | 1 | 1 | – | R. Milla | R. Milla | |
| (France) Lens | 1 | 1 | – | E-H. Diouf | P. B. Diop | |
| (Italy) Milan | 1 | 1 | – | G. Weah | G. Weah | |
| (Portugal) Sporting CP | 1 | 1 | – | E. Amunike | E. Amunike | |
| (Algeria) GC Mascara | 1 | – | 1 | L. Belloumi | | L. Belloumi |
| (Belgium) Cercle Brugge | 1 | – | – | K. Bwalya | | |
| (Republic of the Congo) CARA Brazzaville | 1 | – | – | P. Moukila | | |
| (England) Leicester City | 1 | – | – | R. Mahrez | | |
| (France) Saint-Étienne | 1 | – | – | S. Keïta | | |
| (France) Toulouse | 1 | – | – | T. Abega | | |
| (Italy) Parma | 1 | – | – | P. Mboma | | |
| (Morocco) AS FAR | 1 | – | – | M. Timoumi | | |
| (Morocco) SCC Mohammédia | 1 | – | – | A. Faras | | |
| (Portugal) Vitória de Setúbal | 1 | – | – | R. Yekini | | |
| (Réunion) JS Saint-Pierroise | 1 | – | – | R. Milla | | |
| (Spain) Deportivo La Coruña | 1 | – | – | M. Hadji | | |
| (Spain) Espanyol | 1 | – | – | T. N'Kono | | |
| (Spain) Sevilla | 1 | – | – | F. Kanouté | | |
| (Tunisia) ES Tunis | 1 | – | – | T. Dhiab | | |
| (Italy) Napoli | 1 | – | – | V. Osimhen | | |
| (Italy) Atalanta | 1 | – | – | A. Lookman | | |
| (Algeria) MC Alger | – | 1 | 1 | | | |
| (Ivory Coast) ASEC Mimosas | – | 1 | 1 | | | |
| (France) Montpellier | – | 1 | 1 | | | |
| (Germany) Eintracht Frankfurt | – | 1 | 1 | | | |
| (Nigeria) Shooting Stars | – | 1 | 1 | | | |
| (China) Shanghai Shenhua | – | 1 | – | | | |
| (Democratic Republic of the Congo) Vita Club | – | 1 | – | | | |
| (Egypt) Al Mokawloon Al Arab | – | 1 | – | | | |
| (England) Sunderland | – | 1 | – | | | |
| (France) Bordeaux | – | 1 | – | | | |
| (France) FC Mulhouse | – | 1 | – | | | |
| (Ghana) Hearts of Oak | – | 1 | – | | | |
| (Switzerland) FC Sion | – | 1 | – | | | |
| (Turkey) Aydınspor | – | 1 | – | | | |
| (Egypt) Zamalek | – | 1 | 2 | | | |
| (England) Bolton Wanderers | – | – | 2 | | | |
| (England) Everton | – | – | 2 | | | |
| (Netherlands) Ajax | – | – | 2 | | | |
| (Algeria) JS Kabylie | – | – | 1 | | | |
| (Egypt) Ismaily | – | – | 1 | | | |
| (France) Cannes | – | – | 1 | | | |
| (France) Stade Lavallois | – | – | 1 | | | |
| (France) Lille | – | – | 1 | | | |
| (France) Rennes | – | – | 1 | | | |
| (Greece) Olympiacos | – | – | 1 | | | |
| (Guinea) Horoya AC | – | – | 1 | | | |
| (Netherlands) PSV Eindhoven | – | – | 1 | | | |
| (Togo) OC Agaza | – | – | 1 | | | |
| (Turkey) Beşiktaş | – | – | 1 | | | |
| (Turkey) Galatasaray | – | – | 2 | | | |
| (Wales) Swansea City | – | – | 1 | | | |

== See also ==
- African Women's Footballer of the Year
- BBC African Footballer of the Year
- CAF Awards
- List of sport awards
