= Mărdărescu =

Mărdărescu is a Romanian surname. Notable people with the surname include:

- Gheorghe Mărdărescu
- Gil Mărdărescu (born 1952), Romanian-American footballer
- Virgil Mărdărescu (1921–2003), Romanian football manager, father of Gil
