= 1976 African Cup of Nations =

10th edition of the Africa Cup of Nations

1976 የአፍሪካ ዋንጫ

Tournament details
- Host country: Ethiopia
- Dates: 29 February – 14 March
- Teams: 8
- Venues: 2 (in 2 host cities)

Final positions
- Champions: Morocco (1st title)
- Runners-up: Guinea
- Third place: Nigeria
- Fourth place: Egypt

Tournament statistics
- Matches played: 18
- Goals scored: 54 (3 per match)
- Top scorer(s): (Guinea) Mamadou Aliou Keïta (4 goals)
- Best player: (Morocco) Ahmed Faras

The 1976 African Cup of Nations was the tenth edition of the African Cup of Nations, the international football championship run by the Confederation of African Football (CAF). It was hosted by Ethiopia. The format of competition changed from 1974: the field of eight teams was still split into two groups of four, but a final stage was introduced with the top two finishers of each of the first stage groups, in the form of a semi-final and a final. This was the same approach that would follow in the 1974 and 1978 FIFA World Cups.

Morocco won its first championship by topping the final group. Guinea finished second.

Until Kenya, Tanzania and Uganda won a joint bid to host the 2027 edition of the tournament, this was the last edition to be held in East Africa.

== Qualified teams ==
The 8 qualified teams were:

Team	Qualified as	Qualified on	Previous appearances in tournament (Note: Bold indicates champion for that year, Italic indicates host.)
Ethiopia	Hosts		7 (1957, 1959, **1962**, 1963, 1965, 1968, 1970)
Zaire	Holders	14 March 1974	5 (1965, **1968**, 1970, 1972, **1974**)
Morocco	2nd round winners	13 July 1975	1 (1972)
Guinea	2nd round winners	17 July 1975	2 (1970, 1974)
Nigeria	2nd round winners	27 July 1975	1 (1963)
Egypt	2nd round winners	1 August 1975	6 (**1957**, **1959**, 1962, 1963, 1970, 1974)
Sudan	2nd round winners	15 August 1975	5 (1957, 1959, 1963, **1970**, 1972)
Uganda	2nd round winners	15 August 1975	3 (1962, 1968, 1974)

== Venues ==
Addis Ababa
Addis Ababa Stadium
Capacity: **30,000**
Dire Dawa
Dire Dawa Stadium
Capacity: **18,000**

== First round ==
=== Tiebreakers ===
If two or more teams finished level on points after completion of the group matches, the following tie-breakers were used to determine the final ranking:

1. Goal difference in all group matches
2. Greater number of goals scored in all group matches
3. Drawing of lots

=== Group A ===
Pos	Team	Pld	W	D	L	GF	GA	GD	Pts	Qualification
1	Guinea	3	2	1	0	5	3	+2	**5**	Advance to Final round
2	Egypt	3	1	2	0	4	3	+1	**4**	Advance to Final round
3	Ethiopia (H)	3	1	1	1	4	3	+1	**3**	
4	Uganda	3	0	0	3	2	6	−4	**0**	

Rules for classification: Group stage tiebreakers
(H) Hosts
29 February 1976

Ethiopia	2–0	Uganda
Sheferahu 2'; Seyoum 83'

Addis Ababa Stadium, Addis Ababa
Attendance: 30,000
Referee: Abdelkader Aouissi (Algeria)
29 February 1976

Egypt	1–1	Guinea
Basri 43'		B. Sylla 44' (pen.)

Addis Ababa Stadium, Addis Ababa
Attendance: 30,000
Referee: Youssou N'Diaye (Senegal)

3 March 1976

Egypt	2–1	Uganda
Abdou 26'; Basri 32'		Obua 21'

Addis Ababa Stadium, Addis Ababa
Referee: Théophile Lawson-Hétchéli (Togo)
3 March 1976

Ethiopia	1–2	Guinea
Sheferahu 40'		N'Jo Léa 15'; Petit Sory 85'

Addis Ababa Stadium, Addis Ababa
Referee: Saad Gamar (Libya)

5 March 1976

Guinea	2–1	Uganda
N'Jo Léa 2'; Sylla 20'		Muguwa 85'

Addis Ababa Stadium, Addis Ababa
Referee: John Amenghor (Ghana)
5 March 1976

Ethiopia	1–1	Egypt
Ali 46'		Shehata 26'

Addis Ababa Stadium, Addis Ababa
Attendance: 25,000
Referee: Abdelkader Aouissi (Algeria)

=== Group B ===
Pos	Team	Pld	W	D	L	GF	GA	GD	Pts	Qualification
1	Morocco	3	2	1	0	6	3	+3	**5**	Advance to Final round
2	Nigeria	3	2	0	1	6	5	+1	**4**	Advance to Final round
3	Sudan	3	0	2	1	3	4	−1	**2**	
4	Zaire	3	0	1	2	3	6	−3	**1**	

Rules for classification: Group stage tiebreakers
1 March 1976

Nigeria	4–2	Zaire
Mohammed 28', 44'; Ojebode 37' (pen.); Usiyan 90'		Kabasu 51'; Ekofa 58'

Dire Dawa Stadium, Dire Dawa
Referee: Hédi Seoudi (Tunisia)
1 March 1976

Morocco	2–2	Sudan
Fetoui 1'; Abouali 58'		Gagarin 9', 79' (pen.)

Dire Dawa Stadium, Dire Dawa
Referee: Gratian Matovu (Tanzania)

4 March 1976

Nigeria	1–0	Sudan
Usiyan 8'

Dire Dawa Stadium, Dire Dawa
Referee: Nyirenda Chayu (Zambia)
4 March 1976

Morocco	1–0	Zaire
Zahraoui 80'

Dire Dawa Stadium, Dire Dawa
Referee: Yousef Alghoul (Libya)

6 March 1976

Morocco	3–1	Nigeria
Faras 8'; Tazi 19'; Chebbak 81'		Ojebode 81'

Dire Dawa Stadium, Dire Dawa
Attendance: 4,000
Referee: Bernard Grah (Ivory Coast)
6 March 1976

Zaire	1–1	Sudan
Mulamba 41'		Gagarin 14'

Dire Dawa Stadium, Dire Dawa
Attendance: 4,000
Referee: Robert Foiret (Mauritius)

== Final round ==
Pos	Team	Pld	W	D	L	GF	GA	GD	Pts	Result
1	Morocco	3	2	1	0	5	3	+2	**5**	**Champions**
2	Guinea	3	1	2	0	6	4	+2	**4**	
3	Nigeria	3	1	1	1	5	5	0	**3**	
4	Egypt	3	0	0	3	5	9	−4	**0**	

9 March 1976

Guinea	1–1	Nigeria
Camara 88'		Lawal 55'

Addis Ababa Stadium, Addis Ababa
Attendance: 10,000
Referee: Hédi Seoudi (Tunisia)
9 March 1976

Morocco	2–1	Egypt
Faras 23'; Zahraoui 88'		Abou Rehab 34'

Addis Ababa Stadium, Addis Ababa
Attendance: 10,000
Referee: Yousef Alghoul (Libya)

11 March 1976

Morocco	2–1	Nigeria
Faras 82'; Guezzar 87'		Mohammed 57'

Addis Ababa Stadium, Addis Ababa
Referee: Youssou N'Diaye (Senegal)
11 March 1976

Guinea	4–2	Egypt
N'Jo Léa 24', 65'; Sultan 53' (o.g.); M. Sylla 62'		Abdou 33'; El-Seyagui 86'

Addis Ababa Stadium, Addis Ababa
Attendance: 10,000
Referee: Théophile Lawson-Hétchéli (Togo)

14 March 1976

Nigeria	3–2	Egypt
Ilerika 35', 62'; Lawal 82'		El Khatib 7'; Khalil 86'

Addis Ababa Stadium, Addis Ababa
Attendance: 25,000
Referee: Bernard Grah (Ivory Coast)
14 March 1976

Guinea	1–1	Morocco
Souleymane 33'	Report	Baba 86'

Addis Ababa Stadium, Addis Ababa
Attendance: 30,000
Referee: Nyirenda Chayu (Zambia)

== Goalscorers ==
There were 54 goals scored in 18 matches, for an average of 3 goals per match.

4 goals

- (Guinea) Mamadou Aliou Keïta

3 goals

- (Morocco) Ahmed Faras
- (Nigeria) Baba Otu Mohammed
- (Sudan) Ali Gagarin

2 goals

- (Egypt) Mustafa Abdou
- (Egypt) Taha Basri
- (Ethiopia) Solomon Sheferahu
- (Morocco) Abdelâali Zahraoui
- (Nigeria) Haruna Ilerika
- (Nigeria) Muda Lawal
- (Nigeria) Sam Ojebode
- (Nigeria) Thompson Usiyan
- (Guinea) Bengally Sylla

1 goal

- (Egypt) Ahmed Abou Rehab
- (Egypt) Hassan Shehata
- (Egypt) Mahmoud El Khatib
- (Egypt) Mohamed El-Seyagui
- (Egypt) Osama Khalil
- (Ethiopia) Mohamed Ali
- (Ethiopia) Tesfaye Seyoum
- (Guinea) Papa Camara
- (Guinea) Chérif Souleymane
- (Guinea) Petit Sory
- (Guinea) Morciré Sylla
- (Morocco) Ahmed Abouali
- (Morocco) Mustapha "Chérif" Fetoui
- (Morocco) Redouane Guezzar
- (Morocco) Larbi Chebbak
- (Morocco) Ahmed "Baba" Makrouh
- (Morocco) Abdallah Tazi
- (Uganda) Denis Obua
- (Uganda) Jimmy Muguwa
- (Zaire) Kabasu Babo
- (Zaire) Mbungu Ekofa
- (Zaire) Ndaye Mulamba

1 own goal

- (Egypt) Ghanem Sultan (against Guinea)

== Awards ==
=== Team of the Tournament ===
Goalkeeper	Defenders	Midfielders	Forwards
(Morocco) Mohammed Al-Hazaz	(Morocco) Mustapha "Chérif" Fetoui (Egypt) Mustafa Younis (Guinea) Chérif Souleymane (Guinea) Djibril Diara	(Ethiopia) Tolde (Egypt) Farouk Gaafar (Nigeria) Haruna Ilerika (Nigeria) Kunle Awesu	(Guinea) Petit Sory (Morocco) Ahmed Faras

=== Final ranking ===
Results of countries participating in AFCON 1976 Champion Runner-up Third place Fourth place First round

Pos	Grp	Team	Pld	W	D	L	GF	GA	GD	Pts	Result
1	B	Morocco	6	4	2	0	11	6	+5	10	Champions
2	A	Guinea	6	3	3	0	11	7	+4	9	Runners-up
3	B	Nigeria	6	3	1	2	11	10	+1	7	Third place
4	A	Egypt	6	1	2	3	9	12	−3	4	Fourth place
5	A	Ethiopia	3	1	1	1	4	3	+1	3	Eliminated in the first round
6	B	Sudan	3	0	2	1	3	4	−1	2	Eliminated in the first round
7	B	Zaire	3	0	1	2	3	6	−3	1	Eliminated in the first round
8	A	Uganda	3	0	0	3	2	6	−4	0	Eliminated in the first round
