= Youssouf Fofana =

Youssouf Fofana may refer to:

- Youssouf Fofana (Ivorian footballer) (born 1966), Ivorian footballer
- Youssouf Fofana (born 1980), French murderer (The Affair of the Gang of Barbarians)
- Youssouf Fofana (French footballer) (born 1999), French footballer
