= 1972 African Cup of Champions Clubs =

Tournament details
- Dates: April - 22 December 1972
- Teams: 26 (from 1 confederation)

Final positions
- Champions: (Guinea) Hafia FC (1st title)
- Runners-up: (Uganda) Simba FC

Tournament statistics
- Matches played: 45
- Goals scored: 154 (3.42 per match)
- Top scorer(s): (Zambia) Godfrey Chitalu (13 goals)
- Best player: (Guinea) Chérif Souleymane

The African Cup of Champions Clubs 1972 was the 8th edition of the annual international club football competition held in the CAF region (Africa), the African Cup of Champions Clubs. It determined that year's club champion of association football in Africa.

The tournament was played by 26 teams and used a knock-out format with ties played home and away. Hafia FC from Guinea won the final, becoming CAF club champion for the first time and the first Guinean team to win the trophy.

== First round ==
| Team 1 | Agg. | Team 2 | 1st leg | 2nd leg |
|---|---|---|---|---|
| ASFA Ouagadougou (Republic of Upper Volta) | 1–4 | (Mali) Djoliba AC | 1–3 | 0–1 |
| Aigle Nkongsamba (Cameroon) | 3–2 | (Central African Republic) Olympic Real de Bangui | 3–1 | 0–1 |
| Al-Ahli Tripoli (Libya) | w/o^{1} | (Sudan) Al-Merrikh | — | — |
| ASFA (Senegal) | 6–2 | (Republic of Dahomey) AS Cotonou | 3–0 | 3–2 |
| Hafia FC (Guinea) | 5–2 | (Niger) ASFAN | 4–1 | 1–1 |
| Hearts of Oak (Ghana) | w/o^{2} | (Kenya) Abaluhya United | — | — |
| Majantja (Lesotho) | 2–11 | (Zambia) Kabwe Warriors | 2–2 | 0–9 |
| AS Saint Michel (Madagascar) | 2–1 | (Tanzania) Young Africans | 2–0 | 0–1 |
| Saint-George SA (Ethiopia) | 4–2 | (Somalia) Lavori Publici | 3–1 | 1–1 |
| TP Mazembe (Zaire) | 3–1 | (Gabon) AS Police | 2–0 | 1–1 |

^{1}Al-Merrikh withdrew.
^{2}Abaluhya United withdrew.

== Second round ==
| Team 1 | Agg. | Team 2 | 1st leg | 2nd leg |
|---|---|---|---|---|
| Africa Sports (Ivory Coast) | 3–7 | (Zaire) TP Mazembe | 1–2 | 2–5 |
| Canon Yaoundé (Cameroon) | 4–6 | (Guinea) Hafia FC | 3–2 | 1–4 |
| Dynamic Togolais (Togo) | 4–5 | (Cameroon) Aigle Nkongsamba | 1-1 | 3-4 |
| ASFA (Senegal) | 2–2 | (Mali) Djoliba AC | 2–0 | 0–2^{1} |
| Ismaily (Egypt) | 2–2 (3–4 p) | (Libya) Al-Ahli Tripoli | 0–1 | 2–1 |
| Kabwe Warriors (Zambia) | 5–1 | (Madagascar) AS Saint Michel | 2–1 | 3–0 |
| Simba FC (Uganda) | 5–1 | (Ethiopia) Saint-George SA | 4–0 | 1–1 |
| WNDC Ibadan (Nigeria) | 1–3 | (Ghana) Hearts of Oak | 1–0 | 0–3 |

^{1} After the match had finished 2-0 to Djoliba AC, leaving the aggregate level at 2–2, AS Forces Armées (Dakar) refused to take part in the penalty shootout to protest the officiating; they were ejected from the competition and banned from CAF competitions for three years.

== Quarter-finals ==
| Team 1 | Agg. | Team 2 | 1st leg | 2nd leg |
|---|---|---|---|---|
| Al-Ahli Tripoli (Libya) | 1–4 | (Uganda) Simba FC | 1–1 | 0–3 |
| Hafia FC (Guinea) | 4–2 | (Mali) Djoliba AC | 3–0 | 1–2 |
| Hearts of Oak (Ghana) | 8–4 | (Zambia) Kabwe Warriors | 7–2 | 1–2 |
| TP Mazembe (Zaire) | 6–2 | (Cameroon) Aigle Nkongsamba | 4–1 | 2–1 |

== Semi-finals ==
| Team 1 | Agg. | Team 2 | 1st leg | 2nd leg |
|---|---|---|---|---|
| Hearts of Oak (Ghana) | 1–2 | (Uganda) Simba FC | 1–1 | 0–1 |
| TP Mazembe (Zaire) | 3–4 | (Guinea) Hafia FC | 3–2 | 0–2^{1} |

^{1} TP Mazembe refused to play the 2nd leg contesting the eligibility of the referees assigned by CAF: TP Mazembe were ejected from the competition, and CAF awarded Hafia FC a 2–0 victory.

== Final ==
10 December 1972
--:-- UTC+0

| Hafia FC (Guinea) | 4–2 | (Uganda) Simba FC |
|---|---|---|
| Petit Sory 19'; Souleymane 35', ?'; N’Jo Léa ?' | | Wandera ?', ?' |

Stade du 28 Septembre, Conakry
22 December 1972
--:-- UTC+3

| Simba FC (Uganda) | 2–3 | (Guinea) Hafia FC |
|---|---|---|
| Wasswa 74'; Sukuma 88' | | Souleymane 67'; Tolo 69'; N’Jo Léa 76' |

Nakivubo Stadium, Kampala
Referee: Tesfaye Gebreyesus (Ethiopia)

== Champion ==
African Cup of Champions Clubs
1972 Winners

Hafia FC
First Title

== Top scorers ==
The top scorers from the 1972 African Cup of Champions Clubs are as follows:

| Rank | Name | Team | Goals |
|---|---|---|---|
| 1 | (Zambia) Godfrey Chitalu | (Zambia) Kabwe Warriors | 13 |
| 2 | (Guinea) Chérif Souleymane | (Guinea) Hafia FC | 4 |
| 3 | (Guinea) N’Jo Léa | (Guinea) Hafia FC | 2 |
| 3 | (Guinea) Petit Sory | (Guinea) Hafia FC | 2 |
| 3 | (Guinea) Tolo | (Guinea) Hafia FC | 2 |
| 3 | (Uganda) Denis Obua | (Uganda) Simba FC | 2 |
| 3 | (Zaire) Kamunda Tshinabu | (Zaire) TP Mazembe | 2 |
| 3 | (Zambia) Oliver Musonda | (Zambia) Kabwe Warriors | 2 |
| 3 | (Zambia) Boniface Simutowe | (Zambia) Kabwe Warriors | 2 |
