= Virgil Mărdărescu =

Romanian football manager (1921–2003)

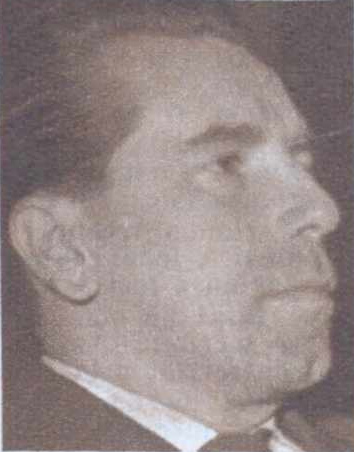

Personal information
- Full name: Virgil Vintilă Mărdărescu
- Date of birth: 15 July 1921
- Place of birth: Bucharest, Romania
- Date of death: 11 June 2003 (aged 81)
- Place of death: Aliso Viejo, California, United States

Senior career*
Years	Team	Apps	(Gls)
1947–1949	Flacăra București	5	(0)

Managerial career
- 1955–1956: Dinamo Brașov
- 1957–1958: Dinamo Cluj
- 1958–1959: Universitatea Cluj
- 1959: Jiul Petroșani
- 1960–1961: Știința Craiova
- 1961–1962: Gloria Bistrița
- 1962–1963: Dinamo Bacău
- 1963–1965: Argeș Pitești
- 1965–1968: Farul Constanța
- 1969–1970: Romania Olympic
- 1970–1973: Politehnica Iași
- 1974–1978: Morocco
- 1980: New York United
Medal record
Representing Morocco (as head coach)
Africa Cup of Nations
Winner	1976
Pan Arab Games
Winner	1976
- * Club domestic league appearances and goals

Virgil Vintilă Mărdărescu (also known as "Gil Mărdărescu"; 15 July 1921 – 11 June 2003) was a Romanian football player and manager.

== Playing career ==
Mărdărescu was born on 15 July 1921 in Bucharest, Romania. He made his Divizia A debut on 8 February 1948, playing for Flacăra București under the guidance of coach Emerich Vogl in a 5–0 home win over UD Reșița. He made a total of five appearances in the first league over the course of two seasons spent at Flacăra.

== Managerial career ==
Mărdărescu started coaching at age 34 in 1955 at Dinamo Brașov, then he went to Dinamo Cluj. Afterwards, in the 1958–59 season he worked at Universitatea Cluj with whom he finished the season in 11th place. His following spells were at Jiul Petroșani and Știința Craiova, with the latter being close to earn a promotion to the first league, finishing in second place in the 1960–61 Divizia B season. After a few years at Gloria Bistrița and Dinamo Bacău, he went to work for Argeș Pitești from 1963 until 1965, a period in which the team reached the 1965 Cupa României final which was lost with 2–1 to Știința Cluj. Between 1965 and 1968, Mărdărescu coached Farul Constanța with whom he finished in fourth place in the 1966–67 season. In 1969 he went to work for Romania Olympic/B and undertook a tour of Israel and Australia. In 1970 he was appointed coach at Politehnica Iași where he made a good impression in his first season as the club finished in 8th place. However, in the following season the team was relegated, but Mărdărescu stayed with The Copou Squad, helping it get promoted back to the first league after one year. He has a total of 273 matches as a manager in the Romanian top-division, Divizia A, consisting of 94 victories, 61 draws and 118 losses.

In 1974, Mărdărescu was hired by the Royal Moroccan Football Federation to replace Abderrahmane Mahjoub as the head coach of the national team. He managed to qualify Morocco to the 1976 African Cup of Nations after getting past three qualification rounds, eliminating Gambia, Senegal and Ghana. The final tournament was composed of two group stages, they advanced past the first one after a draw against Sudan, followed by victories over Nigeria and title holders Zaire. In the final group stage, Morocco defeated Egypt and once again Nigeria. The final game of the group was against Guinea which was coached by Mărdărescu's compatriot Petre Moldoveanu, and Morocco needed just a draw to win the competition. After Cherif Souleymane opened the score for Guinea in the 33rd minute, Ahmed Makrouh equalized in the last minutes of the game, thus the result was 1–1 and the Moroccan side won its first ever African Cup of Nations tournament. Additionally forward Ahmed Faras was named the best player of the competition. Afterwards he failed to qualify Morocco to the 1978 World Cup, being eliminated at the penalty shoot-out in the first qualifying round by Tunisia. Mărdărescu also led them in the 1978 African Cup of Nations where they failed to progress from their group as they earned a draw against Tunisia, a win over Congo and a defeat to Uganda. During his time spent with The Atlas Lions he also won the 1976 Pan Arab Games and debuted future Moroccan star Abdelmajid Dolmy.

Mărdărescu's last coaching spell was in 1980 in the United States at New York United.

== Personal life ==
Mărdărescu's son, Mircea "Gil" Mărdărescu, played together with Pelé for the New York Cosmos in the NASL, and Mărdărescu also coached Mircea at Politehnica Iași.

== Death ==
Mărdărescu died on 11 June 2003 in Aliso Viejo, California, United States at the age of 81.

== Honours ==
Argeș Pitești

- Cupa României runner-up: 1964–65

Politehnica Iași

- Divizia B: 1972–73

Morocco

- Africa Cup of Nations: 1976
- Pan Arab Games: 1976
