= Ahmed Moujahid =

Moroccan footballer (died 2026)

Personal information
- Date of death: 3 January 2026
- Position: Midfielder

Senior career*
| Years | Team | Apps | (Gls) |
- Wydad Casablanca

International career
- Morocco
- * Club domestic league appearances and goals

Ahmed Moujahid (Arabic: أحمد مجاهد; died 3 January 2026) was a Moroccan footballer who played as a midfielder.

Moujahid played international matches for Morocco in the 1970s, winning the 1976 African Cup of Nations. He won third place in the 1971 Maghreb Cup Winners Cup with Wydad AC and won the Botola in 1977.

Moujahid died on 3 January 2026.
