= Ghizlane Chebbak =

Moroccan footballer (born 1990)

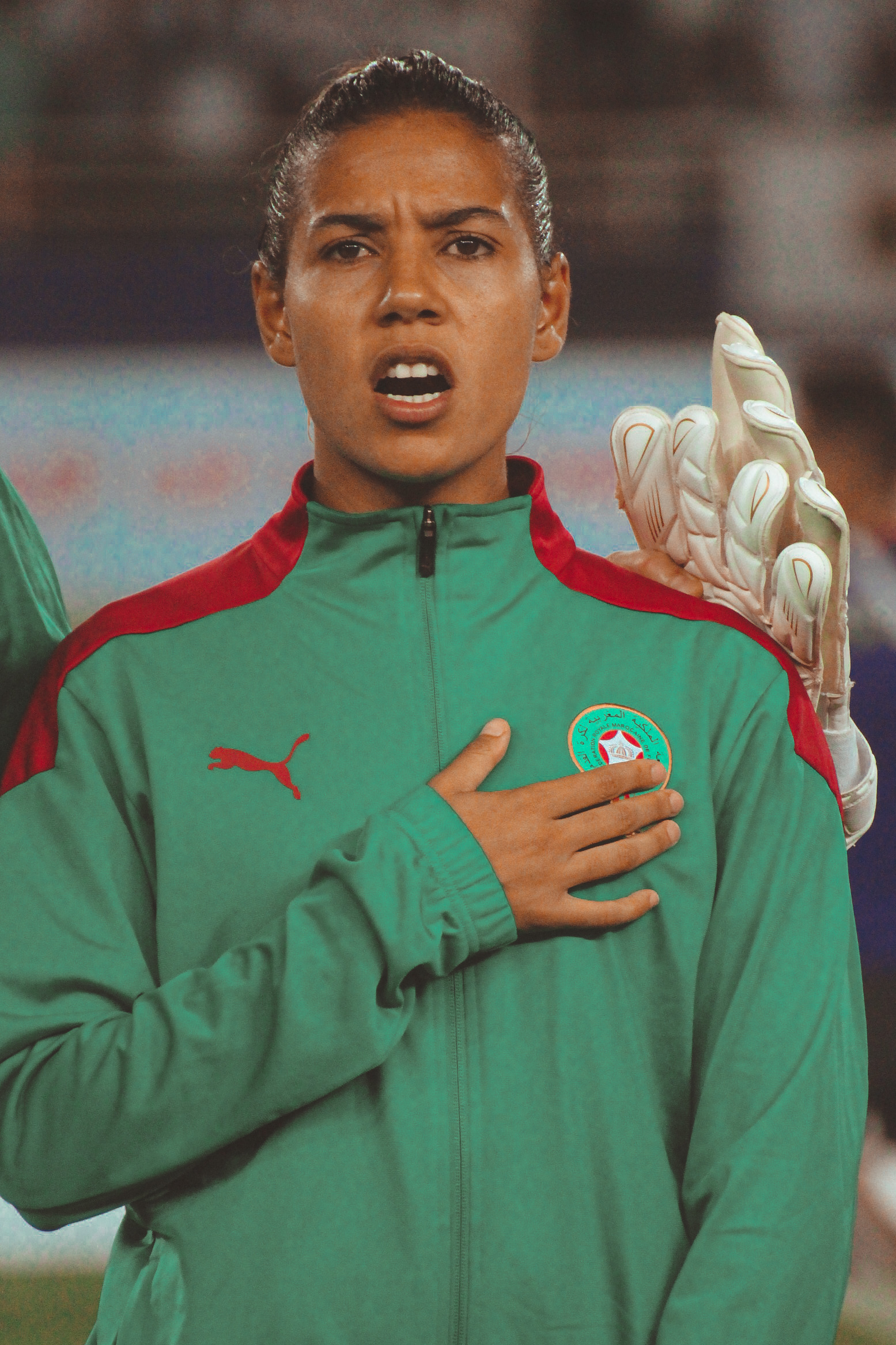
- Chebbak with Morocco in 2022

Personal information
- Date of birth: 22 August 1990 (age 36)
- Place of birth: Casablanca, Morocco
- Height: 1.66 m (5 ft 5 in)
- Position: Forward

Team information
- Current team: ASFAR

Senior career*
Years	Team	Apps	(Gls)
2006–2007	Rachad Bernoussi		
2007–2008	Raja Aïn Harrouda		
2008–2009	Wydad AC		
2009–2010	Raja CA		
2010–2011	CM Laâyoune		
2011–2012	Misr Lel Makkasa SC		
2012–2024	ASFAR		
2024–2025	Levante Badalona	38	(5)
2025–2026	Al Hilal SFC	13	(2)
2026–	ASFAR		

International career
2007–	Morocco	103	(32)
Medal record
Representing Morocco
UNAF Women's Tournament
Winner	2020 Tunisia
Women's Africa Cup of Nations
Second place	2022 Morocco
Second place	2024 Morocco
- * Club domestic league appearances and goals

Ghizlane Chebbak (Arabic: غزلان الشباك; born 22 February 1990) is a Moroccan professional footballer who plays as a forward for club AS FAR and the Morocco women's national team. She was named the player of the tournament in the 2022 Africa Women's Cup of Nations. She is the daughter of Larbi Chebbak, a player for the Morocco men's national team in the 1970s.

In 2025, Ghizlane became the first Moroccan player and the second African player to win FIFPRO Best XI award. She was also named the 2025 African Women's Player of the Year, becoming the first Moroccan recipient of the award.

== Club career ==
Chebbak began her career with the club Ain Sebaa. Then, she joined Rachad Bernoussi. She first played with Wydad AC and then with Raja CA and then to the Municipal Club of Al-Ayoun. She played on the streets, with a boys' club, and began competing in senior women's football at the age of 13.

In early 2011, Chebbak played with the Morocco women's national team in a friendly match against Egypt in Cairo. She scored a brace and Morocco won 2–1. Her performance drew interest from the leaders of the Egyptian club Misr Lel Makkasa SC. She joined the club during the 2010/11 season where she competed in the Egyptian Premier League. Her experience was cut short due to political instability in Egypt after the 25 January revolution.

After a little experience in Egypt, she returned to Morocco to play for Al Nassim (Sidi Moumen) before joining AS FAR in 2012.

Chebbak has won the Moroccan Women's Championship 10 times and the Moroccan Women Throne Cup 9 times with AS FAR. During the 2013–14 season, she was the top scorer in the league with 54 goals in 20 matches, a club record. She has been the top scorer in the league five times: 2014, 2015, 2016, 2017, and 2023. She has also been named "Player of the Year in Morocco" three times.

Chebbak participated in the first edition of the CAF Women's Champions League which took place in Egypt in November 2021. AS FAR finished third. Chebbak played in all matches. She did not score any goals, but provided three assists.

AS FAR won the CAF Women's Champions League in 2022 with a 4–0 victory over titleholders Mamelodi Sundowns. However, Chebbak did not play any matches due to injury.

On 14 November 2023, Chebbak was nominated for the 2023 African Player of the Year and 2023 Interclub Player of the Year by CAF.

In 2024, Chebbak signed for Levante Badalona in Spain's Liga F. She was the first Moroccan to move from a domestic club to a European club.

== International career ==
Chebbak has played with the Morocco national team since 2007. She played her first game on 8 March 2008, in a friendly against France in Casablanca. Morocco lost 6–0. It was the first match the French team had ever played in Africa.

Chebbak is Morocco's most capped player. She served as Morocco's captain at the 2022 Women's Africa Cup of Nations, where they finished second, and the 2023 Women's World Cup. She was the top scorer at 2022 Women's Africa Cup of Nations tournament and named both Player of the Tournament and to the Team of the Tournament. She was also named to the IHFSS 2022 Team of the Year. On 9 July 2025, Chebbak scored her first-ever hat trick in the Women's Africa Cup of Nations (WAFCON 2024), leading Morocco to a thrilling 4–2 victory over DR Congo in the group stage. Her standout performance not only secured the Atlas Lionesses' second win of the tournament but also marked a historic personal milestone in her WAFCON career.

== Personal life ==
Chebbak's father, Larbi Chebbak, was also an international footballer and supported her in playing football and her career.

== Career statistics ==
Club	Season	Division	League		Cup		Continental		Other		Total	
Club	Season	Division	Apps	Goals	Apps	Goals	Apps	Goals	Apps	Goals	Apps	Goals
AS FAR	2013-14	Moroccan Women's Championship	20	54	1	1					21	55
AS FAR	2014-15	Moroccan Women's Championship	19	37							19	37
AS FAR	2015-16	Moroccan Women's Championship	18	39							18	39
AS FAR	2016-17	Moroccan Women's Championship	14	35							14	35
AS FAR	2017-18	Moroccan Women's Championship										
AS FAR	2018-19	Moroccan Women's Championship			1	1					1	1
AS FAR	2019-20	Moroccan Women's Championship										
AS FAR	2020-21	Moroccan Women's Championship					6	4			6	4
AS FAR	2021-22	Moroccan Women's Championship					3	0			3	0
AS FAR	2022-23	Moroccan Women's Championship	21	23			3	0			24	23
AS FAR	2026-27	Moroccan Women's Championship	1	0			5	2			6	2
AS FAR	Total		93	188	2	2	17	6			112	196
Badalona	2023-24	Liga F	13	2							13	2
Badalona	2024-25	Liga F	25	3	1	0					26	3
Badalona	Total		38	5	1	0					39	5
Al Ahli	2025-26	Saudi Women's Premier League	13	2	4	4			4	0	21	6
Total career			144	195	7	6	17	6	4	0	172	207

== Honours ==
AS FAR

- Moroccan Women's Championship (10): 2013, 2014, 2016, 2017, 2018, 2019, 2020, 2021, 2022, 2023
- Moroccan Women Throne Cup (10): 2013, 2014, 2015, 2016, 2017, 2018, 2019, 2020, 2021, 2022
- UNAF Women's Champions League (1): 2021
- CAF Women's Champions League (2): 2022, 2026.

Morocco

- Women's Africa Cup of Nations runner-up: 2022, 2024
- UNAF Women's Tournament: 2020

Individual

- African Women's Footballer of the Year: 2025
- Moroccan Women's Championship Best Player (3): 2018, 2020, 2022
- Moroccan Women's Championship Top Scorer (5): 2014, 2015, 2016, 2017, 2023
- Women's Africa Cup of Nations Best Player: 2022
- Women's Africa Cup of Nations Top Scorer: 2022, 2024
- Women's Africa Cup of Nations Team of the Tournament: 2022, 2024
- CAF Women's Champions League Best Player: 2026
- CAF Women's Champions League Team of the Tournament: 2023
- IFFHS Women's CAF Best Player of the Year: 2022
- IFFHS CAF Women's Team of The Year: 2022
- CAF Women's Africa XI: 2024
- FIFA FIFPRO Women's World 11: 2025

== See also ==
- List of Morocco women's international footballers
