= Football at the 1976 Arab Games =

1976 Arab Games football tournament
Tournament details
- Host country: Syria
- City: Damascus
- Dates: 7–21 October 1976
- Teams: 7 (from 2 confederations)
- Venue: 2 (in 1 host city)

Final positions
- Champions: Morocco (2nd title)
- Runners-up: Saudi Arabia
- Third place: Syria
- Fourth place: South Yemen

Tournament statistics
- Matches played: 21
- Goals scored: 47 (2.24 per match)

The 1976 Arab Games football tournament was the 5th edition of the Arab Games men's football tournament. The football tournament was held in Damascus, Syria between 7–21 October 1976 as part of the 1976 Arab Games.

== Participating teams ==
The following countries have participated for the final tournament:

- Jordan
- Mauritania
- Morocco
- Palestine
- Saudi Arabia
- South Yemen
- Syria (hosts)

== Final tournament ==
=== Tournament classification ===
Team	Pld	W	D	L	GF	GA	GD	Pts
Morocco	6	4	2	0	12	0	+12	10
Saudi Arabia	6	3	1	2	9	4	+5	7
Syria	6	3	1	2	6	4	+2	7
South Yemen	6	3	1	2	7	8	–1	7
Jordan	6	3	0	3	7	9	–2	6
Palestine	6	2	1	3	4	9	–5	5
Mauritania	6	0	0	6	2	13	–11	0

=== Matches ===
7 October 1976

Syria	1–0	Jordan

Abbasiyyin Stadium, Damascus
8 October 1976

Morocco	3–0	Palestine

Damascus
8 October 1976

Saudi Arabia	4–1	Mauritania
Al-Turki 12'; Hamdan 34'; Bakheet 56'; Foudah 83'		62'

Abbasiyyin Stadium, Damascus

10 October 1976

Syria	1–2	South Yemen

Abbasiyyin Stadium, Damascus
10 October 1976

Morocco	0–0	Saudi Arabia

Abbasiyyin Stadium, Damascus
10 October 1976

Jordan	2–1	Mauritania
Mostafa		Goal

Damascus

12 October 1976

Saudi Arabia	3–1	Palestine

Abbasiyyin Stadium, Damascus
12 October 1976

South Yemen	2–0	Mauritania

Damascus
12 October 1976

Morocco	3–0	Jordan
Amcharrat; Smiri

Damascus

14 October 1976

Syria	2–0	Mauritania

Abbasiyyin Stadium, Damascus
14 October 1976

Palestine	2–1	Jordan
Goal		Walid Al-Anabtawi

Damascus
14 October 1976

Morocco	4–0	South Yemen
Amcharrat; Zahraoui; Shaita

Damascus

16 October 1976

Morocco	2–0	Mauritania
Zahraoui

Damascus
16 October 1976

South Yemen	1–0	Saudi Arabia
Saif 60'

Abbasiyyin Stadium, Damascus
16 October 1976

Syria	2–0	Palestine

Abbasiyyin Stadium, Damascus

18 October 1976

Jordan	1–0	Saudi Arabia
Ibrahim Moustafa 75'

Al-Jalaa Stadium, Damascus
18 October 1976

South Yemen	0–0	Palestine

Damascus
18 October 1976

Syria	0–0	Morocco

Damascus

20 October 1976

Jordan	3–2	South Yemen
Mawla; Mostafa		Goal

Damascus
20 October 1976

Palestine	1–0	Mauritania

Damascus
21 October 1976

Syria	0–2	Saudi Arabia
		Hamdan 5'; Khalifa 45'

Abbasiyyin Stadium, Damascus
