= Abdoulaye Keita (Guinean footballer) =

Guinean footballer and manager (died 2019)

Abdoulaye "Banks" Keita was a Guinean football goalkeeper. He was active during the 1970s and 1980s.

== Career ==
Keita was the first-choice goalkeeper of Hafia FC during the successful 1970s period, winning three African Champions Cups. He also played for the Guinea national football team in their African Nations Cup campaigns.

In recent years, Keita served as an assistant coach for the national side.

== Death ==
Suffering from a long illness, Keita died on 30 June, 2019 in Conakry.
