= Gil Mărdărescu =

Romanian-American footballer

Gil Mardaresco
Personal information
- Full name: Mircea Mărdărescu
- Date of birth: 12 April 1952 (age 74)
- Place of birth: Săcele, Romania
- Height: 1.83 m (6 ft 0 in)
- Position: Midfielder

Senior career*
Years	Team	Apps	(Gls)
1970–1973	Politehnica Iași (Note: The statistics for the 1972–73 Divizia B season are not available.)	28	(0)
1973–1975	Wydad Casablanca		
1975	New York Cosmos	5	(0)
1975	Rochester Lancers	2	(1)
1980	New York United		
Total		35	(1)
- * Club domestic league appearances and goals

Mircea "Gil" Mărdărescu (born 12 April 1952, in Săcele) is a retired Romanian-American football (soccer) player.

== Career ==
Mărdărescu started playing football in 1970 at Politehnica Iași under the guidance of his father, Virgil, making 28 appearances in the Romanian top-division Divizia A. At the end of his second season the team was relegated, but he stayed with The Copou Squad, helping it get promoted back to the first league after one year. From 1973 until 1975 he played in Morocco at Wydad Casablanca.

In 1975, he joined the New York Cosmos as a midfielder in the North American Soccer League, where he played alongside three-time World Cup winner Pelé. According to Pelé's autobiography, when Mărdărescu first saw him he made the sign of the cross, then grabbed his hand, telling him:"I always dreamed that I would shake your hand. But playing alongside you is a miracle!". In the same year he moved on to the Rochester Lancers, where he was coached by Ted Dumitru. In 1980, he signed with the New York United football team of the American Soccer League.

== Personal life ==
His father, Virgil Mărdărescu, coached Morocco to the 1976 African Cup of Nations title.

Mărdărescu currently lives in California with his wife Stephanie. He and Stephanie have two children together, Natalie and Nathan. Mărdărescu has three grown children from a previous marriage.

== Honours ==
Politehnica Iași

- Divizia B: 1972–73
