= Fozi el-Mardi =

Sudanese footballer and coach (1953–2023)

Personal information
- Full name: Muhammad Fawzi Mahjoub Al-Mardi
- Date of birth: 4 April 1953
- Place of birth: Omdurman, Anglo-Egyptian Sudan
- Date of death: 5 May 2023 (aged 70)
- Place of death: Omdurman, Sudan
- Position: Centre-back

Senior career*
Years	Team	Apps	(Gls)
1969–1970	Al-Naser		
1971–1976	Al-Hilal SC		
1976-1980	Al-Shaab CSC		
1980	Al-Hilal SC		

International career
1976	Sudan	29	
- * Club domestic league appearances and goals

Muhammad Fawzi Mahjoub Al-Mardi (1953 – 5 May 2023), also known as Fozi el-Mardi (Arabic: فوزي المرضي), was a Sudanese football player, coach, and administrator. He played for Al-Hilal FC in 1971, and played 29 international matches for the Sudan national football team. He won Sudan Premier League in 1973 and Sudan Cup in 1977.

Al-Mardi retired from football in 1980, to start working in the field of training since 1982 for many sports clubs in Sudan. He later became a member of the executive committee of Al-Hilal FC.

On 5 May 2023, at Al Nou Hospital in Omdurman, Al-Mardi died days after the death of his daughter, Alaa who was hit by a projectile on the 17 April, 2 days from the start of the 2023 Sudan conflict. His wife, Zeinat Ahmed Othman, was also wounded by a bullet.
