= Morciré Sylla =

Guinean footballer

Personal information
- Full name: Morciré Sylla
- Date of birth: 3 March 1948
- Place of birth: Kindia, French Guinea
- Date of death: 12 August 2005 (aged 57)
- Place of death: Rabat, Morocco
- Position: Forward

Senior career*
Years	Team	Apps	(Gls)
?–?	Hafia		

International career
1968	Guinea U23	0	(0)
1974–1977	Guinea	20	(4)
- * Club domestic league appearances and goals

Morciré Sylla (3 March 1948 or 22 September 1948– 12 August 2005) was a Guinea international football forward.

== Career ==
Born in Kindia, Sylla played several youth sports, including football, volleyball, basketball and handball. He started playing senior football with local side Hafia F.C., and would play any field position.

Sylla represented Guinea at the 1968 Summer Olympics in Mexico City where, in the opening ceremony, he was the first ever Olympic flag bearer for Guinea. He also made several appearances for the senior Guinea national football team, and played at the 1974 and 1976 African Cup of Nations finals.

== Personal ==
Sylla died at age 57 on 12 August 2005.
