= Sam Ojebode =

Nigerian footballer

Personal information
- Full name: Samuel Adeleke Ojebode
- Date of birth: 14 July 1944
- Place of birth: Oyo, Nigeria
- Date of death: 4 July 2012 (aged 67)
- Place of death: Ibadan, Nigeria
- Position: Left back

Senior career*
Years	Team	Apps	(Gls)
- Ibadan Lions
1971–1978	Shooting Stars		

International career
- Nigeria
- * Club domestic league appearances and goals

Samuel Ojebode (14 July 1944 – 4 July 2012) was a Nigerian footballer.

== Career ==
Ojebode played for Shooting Stars, where he won the 1976 African Cup Winners' Cup; he also captained the Nigerian national side in three matches at the 1976 African Cup of Nations. He appeared in four FIFA World Cup qualifying matches.

He died on 4 July 2012 from lung cancer.
