= Bengally Sylla =

Guinean footballer

Personal information
- Date of birth: 1951
- Place of birth: Guinea
- Date of death: 2013 (aged 61–62)
- Position: Left winger

Senior career*
Years	Team	Apps	(Gls)
1972–1982	Hafia		

International career
1973–1982 (Note: RSSSF states Sylla has 27 caps and 2 goals for Guinea, while National Football Teams states Sylla has 22 caps and 6 goals for Guinea. RSSSF also misses that he also played internationally in 1973 and 1982.)	Guinea		
- * Club domestic league appearances and goals

Bengally Sylla, also known as Bangaly Sylla and Bangally Sylla, (1951 – 2013) was a Guinean footballer who played as a left winger during the 1970s and 1980s.

== Club career ==
A left-winger with pace and skill, Sylla was a star of the successful Hafia FC between 1972 and 1982. He is regarded as being one of Guinea's top players during this period.

Sylla finished fourth in the voting for the 1976 African Footballer of the Year award.

== International career ==
He played for Guinea between 1973 and 1982, and he has anywhere from 22 to 27 caps and anywhere from 2 to 6 goals. He played at the 1976, 1978, and 1980 African Cup of Nations and finished as a runner-up with Guinea in 1976. He also won the 1981 Amílcar Cabral Cup with Guinea.

He retired after the 1982 Cameroon Tournament in May 1982.

== Honours ==
Hafia

- Guinée Championnat National: 1972, 1973, 1974, 1975, 1976, 1977, 1978, 1979, 1982
- African Cup of Champions Clubs: 1972, 1975, 1977; runner-up 1976, 1978

Guinea

- African Cup of Nations: runner-up 1976
- Amílcar Cabral Cup: 1981; third place 1979, 1980
