= Mai Anbessa FC =

Association football club in Eritrea

Mai Anbessa
- Full name: Mai Anbessa Football Club
- Ground: Denden Stadium; Asmara, Eritrea
- League: Eritrean League

Mai Anbessa is an Eritrean football club based in Asmara.
