= Moustafa Abdou =

Egyptian footballer (born 1953)

Moustafa Ahmed Abdou
Personal information
- Date of birth: 10 June 1953 (age 73)
- Place of birth: Cairo, Egypt
- Position: Midfielder

Senior career*
Years	Team	Apps	(Gls)
1971–1987	Al Ahly	243	(43)

International career
1974–1986	Egypt	43	(7)
- * Club domestic league appearances and goals

Moustafa Ahmed Ismail Abdou Ali Arfah (born 10 June 1953) is an Egyptian footballer who played as a forward or midfielder. He competed in the 1984 Summer Olympics.
