= Youssouf Fofana (footballer, born 1966) =

Ivorian footballer (born 1966)

Personal information
- Full name: Youssouf Falikou Fofana
- Date of birth: 26 July 1966 (age 60)
- Place of birth: Divo, Ivory Coast
- Height: 1.76 m (5 ft 9 in)
- Position: Forward

Senior career*
| Years | Team | Apps | (Gls) |
| 1981–1984 | ASEC Mimosas | | |
| 1984–1985 | Cannes | 19 | (4) |
| 1985–1993 | Monaco | 188 | (28) |
| 1993–1995 | Bordeaux | 28 | (1) |
| 1995 | Karşıyaka | 6 | (3) |
| 1995–1996 | Al-Nassr | | |

International career
| 1983–1992 | Ivory Coast | 33 | (12) |
Medal record
Men's football
Representing Ivory Coast
Africa Cup of Nations
| Winner | 1992 Senegal |
- * Club domestic league appearances and goals

Youssouf Falikou Fofana (born 26 July 1966) is an Ivorian former professional footballer who played as a forward for clubs like ASEC Mimosas, AS Cannes, AS Monaco FC, Girondins de Bordeaux, Karşıyaka S.K., Al-Nassr, and the Ivory Coast national team.

Fofana is the sporting director of ASEC Abidjan.

== Honours ==
Monaco

- Division 1: 1987–88
- Coupe de France: 1990–91
- 1991–92 European Cup Winners' Cup runner-up: 1991–92

Ivory Coast

- African Cup of Nations: 1992
