= Haruna Ilerika =

Nigerian footballer

Personal information
- Full name: Haruna Olatunji Ilerika
- Date of birth: 27 October 1949
- Place of birth: Epe, Lagos
- Date of death: 4 December 2008 (aged 59)

College career
Years	Team	Apps	(Gls)
1970	Metal Construction FC		

Senior career*
Years	Team	Apps	(Gls)
1971–1976	Stationery Stores		

International career
1972-1976	Nigeria	30	(4)
- * Club domestic league appearances and goals

Haruna Olatunji Ilerika (27 October 1949 – 4 December 2008) was a Nigerian footballer. Native of Epe, Lagos state, Haruna also attended Lagos city College between 1967 and 1969. He was the school captain and acting coach in 1969 before he moved to Zumratul grammar school.

== Career ==
Ilerika played for the Nigeria national football team between 1971 and 1976 and spent his entire career with Stationery Stores in Lagos.

He joined Stationery Stores FC in 1971 after a brief stint with the defunct Metal Construction Football Club (Apapa). Metal Construction FC had signed him on after he led the Zumratul-Islamiya Grammar School, Surulere to victory in the 1970 Principals' Cup Football competition for secondary schools in Lagos State.

Nicknamed the "Master Dribbler", Ilerika wore the number 9 jersey while on the national team. His last game was in the final of the 1981 Cup Winners Cup where Stores lost to Cameroun's Union Douala 2-1 on aggregate. Chief Ilerika then moved on to the team's technical bench. At the time of his death, he was the Lagos State Football Association Vice-Chairman.

He died on 4 December 2008 at the age of 59.
