= Papa Camara =

Guinean footballer

Personal information
- Full name: Naby Laye Moussa Camara
- Date of birth: 1952
- Place of birth: Dakar, Senegal
- Date of death: 4 January 2018 (aged 65–66)
- Place of death: Conakry, Guinea
- Position: Forward

Senior career*
| Years | Team | Apps | (Gls) |
| 1970–1986 | Hafia | 532 | (142) |

International career
| 1971–1985 | Guinea | 42 | (6) |
- * Club domestic league appearances and goals

Naby Laye "Papa" Camara (1952 – 4 January 2018) was a Guinean footballer of the 1970s and 1980s and football manager.

== Career ==
He played for Hafia FC during the 1970s and early 1980s, and was a member of the Guinea national team.

He played in five African Club Champions Cup finals - the former African Champions League competition - winning three continental titles with the Conakry-based club, Hafia FC.

Known for his dribbling skills, Camara partnered well with the 1972 African Player of the year Cherif Souleymane and played alongside the likes of Petit Sory, Maxine Camara, Cham Ousmane Tolo, Bangaly Sylla and Aliou Njolea to make Hafia FC the most successful club in Africa in the 70's

He also helped Syli Nationale finish as runners-up to Morocco at the 1976 Africa Cup of Nations, the furthest Guinea have ever reached at a Nations Cup.

In recent years, he served as an assistant coach for the national side. He managed the Guinea national football team at the 1994 African Cup of Nations.
