= Kabasu Babo =

Congolese football defender

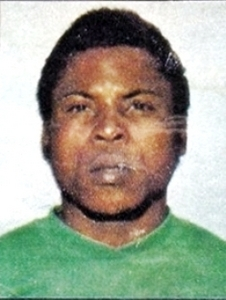
- Babo Kabasu

Personal information
- Full name: Dominique Kabasu Babo
- Date of birth: 4 March 1950
- Place of birth: Belgian Congo
- Date of death: 30 January 2022 (Aged 71)
- Position: Defender

Senior career*
Years	Team	Apps	(Gls)
- AS Dragons

International career
- Zaire
- * Club domestic league appearances and goals

Dominique Kabasu Babo (4 March 1950 – 30 January 2022) was a Congolese football defender who played for Zaire in the 1974 FIFA World Cup. He also played for AS Dragons.

Babo died on 30 January 2022, tributes were made by Tresor Lualua via Instagram.
