= Larbi Chebbak =

Moroccan footballer (1946–2020)

Personal information
- Date of birth: 1946
- Date of death: 30 January 2020 (aged 73)
- Position: Midfielder

Senior career*
Years	Team	Apps	(Gls)
- Union Sidi Kacem

International career
1972–1975	Morocco	20	(0)
- * Club domestic league appearances and goals

Larbi Chebbak (1946 – 30 January 2020) was a Moroccan footballer who played as a midfielder during the 1970s. He played for the Morocco national team and the club Union Sidi Kacem.

Chebbak was born in Ben M'sik, a district in Casablanca. He began his career in football with neighborhood teams, before finding success with Union Sidi Kacem. He also played for Moghreb Tétouan and Wydad Athletic.

In 1976, he helped lead the Morocco national team to victory at the African Cup of Nations. He scored a goal in Morocco's 3–1 victory over Nigeria in the group stage.

His daughter, Ghizlane Chebbak, is an international footballer.
