= Hafia FC =

Guinean football club

Hafia
- Full name: Hafia Football Club
- Nickname: "Tri Campeao"
- Founded: 1951
- Ground: Stade Petit Sory; Conakry, Guinea
- Capacity: 5,400
- Chairman: Kerfalla Person Camara
- Manager: Lakhdar Adjali
- League: Ligue 1 Pro
- 2025–26: 2nd
- Website: http://hafiafc.com/actus-foot-guineen/
Home colours	Away colours	Third colours

Hafia Football Club is a professional football club based in Conakry, Guinea. Founded in 1951, the team was known as Conakry II in the 1960s and won three titles under that name. Hafia have won 16 league titles overall, having dominated in the 1960s and 70s, but their last league title came in 1985. The 1970s were a golden decade for Hafia FC when they dominated African football, winning the African Cup of Champions Clubs three times, in 1972, 1975 and 1977. It promoted some great talents as Papa Camara, Bengally Sylla, Abdoulaye Keita, Chérif Souleymane, Petit Sory, Mamadou Aliou Kéïta. In early 2021, construction began on the new stadium "Stade Petit Sory".

== Kit provider ==
Kit provider	Period
(Belgium) Sindio	2015–2016
(Morocco) Beda	2016–2020
(Spain) Joma	2021–present

== Honours ==
=== Domestic ===
- Ligue 1 Pro: 16
  - Champion: 1971, 1972, 1973, 1974, 1975, 1976, 1977, 1978, 1979, 1982, 1983, 1985, 2023
- Guinée Coupe Nationale: 4
  - Winner: 1992, 1993, 2002, 2017
- Guinean Super Cup: 1
  - Winner: 2002

=== Continental ===
- African Cup of Champions Clubs: 3
  - Champion: 1972, 1975, 1977
  - Runner-up: 1976, 1978
- UFOA Cup:
  - Runner-up: 1992

== Performance in CAF competitions ==
- CAF Champions League: 1 appearance

2020 – Preliminary Round

- African Cup of Champions Clubs: 14 appearances

1967: Quarter-finals
1968: Quarter-finals
1969: Semi-finals
1972: Champion
1973: Quarter-finals

1974: withdrew in Second Round
1975: Champion
1976: Finalist
1977: Champion
1978: Finalist

1979: Quarter-finals
1980: Second Round
1983: Second Round
1984: withdrew in First Round

- CAF Cup Winners' Cup: 3 appearances

1993 – First Round
1994 – First Round
2003 – Second Round
