= Mohammed Hazzaz =

Moroccan footballer

Mohamed Hazzaz
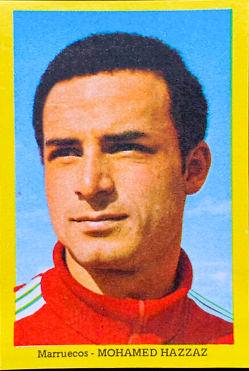

Personal information
- Full name: Mohamed Hamid Hazzaz
- Date of birth: 30 November 1945
- Place of birth: Fez, Morocco
- Date of death: 13 January 2018 (aged 72)
- Place of death: Fez, Morocco
- Position: Goalkeeper

Senior career*
Years	Team	Apps	(Gls)
1962–1984	MAS Fez	281	(0)

International career
1969–1979	Morocco	73	(0)
Medal record
Representing Morocco
Africa Cup of Nations
Winner	1976 Ethiopia
- * Club domestic league appearances and goals

Mohamed Hamid Hazzaz (Arabic: حميد الهزاز; 30 November 1945 – 13 January 2018), also known as Hamid El-Hazzaz, was a Moroccan football goalkeeper. Hazzaz spent his entire career playing for Maghreb de Fès.

== Club career ==
Hazzaz joined the MAS Fez first team in 1962. He won the Moroccan league with the team three times, in 1965, 1979, and 1983, and the Throne Cup once in 1980. He retired in 1984.

== International career ==
Hazzaz first played for played for Morocco against Tunesia in 1968 as part of the 1970 FIFA World Cup qualifiers. He was named to the squad for the 1970 FIFA World Cup where he played Morocco's final group match against Bulgaria. The match finished in a 1–1 draw, making Morocco the first African side to avoid defeat in the World Cup.

Hazzaz represented Morocco at the 1972 Summer Olympics in Munich and the 1976 Africa Cup of Nations. A He also played in the 1976 Arab Games and the 1978 Africa Cup of Nations. In both the 1976 and 1978 Africa Cup of Nations, he was chosen as the goalkeeper for the Team of the Tournament. He retired from international football in 1979.
