= Chérif Fetoui =

Moroccan footballer

Personal information
- Full name: Mustapha Fetoui
- Date of birth: 1 January 1945 (age 81)
- Place of birth: Morocco
- Position: Defender

Senior career*
Years	Team	Apps	(Gls)
1969–1975	MAS Fes	-	(-)
1975–	Difaâ Hassani El Jadidi	-	(-)

International career
1973–1979	Morocco	44	(4)
- * Club domestic league appearances and goals

Mustapha Fetoui nicknamed Chérif Fetoui is a Moroccan footballer who played for Morocco in the 1976 and 1978 African Cup of Nations.

== Honours ==
=== International ===
Morocco

- Africa Cup of Nations: 1976

=== Individual ===
- Africa Cup of Nations Team of the Tournament: 1976
