= Mamadou Aliou Keïta =

Guinean footballer (1952–2004)

Personal information
- Date of birth: 1 January 1952
- Place of birth: Conakry, Guinea
- Date of death: 11 April 2004 (aged 52)
- Position: Forward

Senior career*
Years	Team	Apps	(Gls)
1970–1981	Hafia		

International career^{‡}
1970–1981	Guinea	31	(22)
- * Club domestic league appearances and goals as of 00:11, 26 March 2021 (UTC) ‡ National team caps and goals as of 00:11, 26 March 2021 (UTC)

Mamadou Aliou "N'Jo Lea" Keïta (1 January 1952 – 11 April 2004) was a Guinean footballer who played as a forward for Hafia and the Guinea national team.

== International career ==
Keïta scored 22 goals in 31 games for the Guinea national team, and as of 26 March 2021 is the 4th highest scorer in the history of the team. He was the top scorer at the 1976 African Cup of Nations.

== Death ==
Keïta died on 11 November 2004 in Conakry of cardiac arrest.
