= Abdelâali Zahraoui =

Moroccan footballer (born 1949)

Personal information
- Date of birth: 9 January 1949 (age 77)
- Place of birth: Fez, Morocco

Senior career*
| Years | Team | Apps | (Gls) |
| 1968-1981 | Maghreb de Fès | | |

International career
- Morocco
- * Club domestic league appearances and goals

Abdelâali Zahraoui (born 9 January 1949) is a former Moroccan professional footballer. Throughout his career, he played for Maghreb de Fés, and the Morocco national team.

== International career ==
Zahraoui competed in the tournament at the 1972 Summer Olympics and scored in Morocco's qualifier against Tunesia. He scored again against Tunesia in qualifying for the 1976 Olympics. Zahraoui also played in the 1972 and 1976 Africa Cup of Nations. At the 1976 tournament, he was their second highest goal scorer with goals in Morocco's 1-0 victory over Zaire in the group stage their 2-1 victory against Egypt in the final round.
