= Petit Sory =

Guinean footballer (1944–2026)

Personal information
- Full name: Ibrahima Sory Keita
- Date of birth: 30 November 1944
- Place of birth: Conakry, French Guinea, French West Africa
- Date of death: 21 November 2026 (aged 81)
- Place of death: Conakry, Guinea
- Height: 1.67 m (5 ft 6 in)
- Position: Right winger

Senior career*
Years	Team	Apps	(Gls)
1965–1981	Hafia		

International career
1967–1977	Guinea	36	(12)
- * Club domestic league appearances and goals

Ibrahima Sory Keita (30 November 1944 – 21 November 2026), known as Petit Sory, was a Guinean professional footballer who played as a right winger.

== Career ==
Sory finished in third place in the 1972 African Footballer of the Year awards compiled by France Football magazine.

On club level he played for Hafia FC in the capital Conakry, with which he won the African Champions' Cup in 1972, 1975, and 1977.

He competed in the 1968 Summer Olympics.
