= Chérif Souleymane =

Guinean footballer (born 1944)

Personal information
- Date of birth: 20 October 1944 (age 82)
- Place of birth: Kindia, Guinea
- Position: Midfielder

Senior career*
Years	Team	Apps	(Gls)
1961–1962	TSG Neustrelitz		
1962–1965	SC Neubrandenburg		
1965–1980	Hafia FC	543	(76)

International career
1964–1977	Guinea	68	(20)
- * Club domestic league appearances and goals

Chérif Souleymane, also known as Chérif Soulegmane, (born 20 October 1944) is a Guinean former footballer who played as a midfielder. He is considered among the finest footballers Guinea has ever produced. He was named the France Football African Footballer of the Year and the African Footballer of the Year (the only Guinean to receive that honour) in 1972 while playing with Hafia FC in Conakry.

== Career ==
Born in Kindia the son of a chauffeur and mechanic, Souleymane moved to East Germany when he was 17 to study to become a plumber, but switched to architecture because, he later stated, it made it easier for him to play football. He played for SC Neubrandenburg in the second-tier DDR-Liga for two seasons, from 1962 to 1964.

He returned to his home country and spent the rest of his playing career with top-tier Hafia FC, initially known as Conakry II when he joined the club. He played for Hafia from 1964 to 1978. Hafia was a powerhouse in Guinea and in Africa during this period, winning the Guinée Championnat National, the top national league, from 1965 to 1968 and from 1971 to 1979. In international competition, it won the African Cup of Champions Clubs three times, in 1972, 1975 and 1977, and was the runner-up in 1976, during Souleymane's tenure. In the 1976 African Cup of Nations, Guinea came in second, despite never losing a game, Souleymane's sole regret of his playing career. He was also on the Guinea national team from 1965 through 1977, and competed for Guinea at the 1968 Summer Olympics with the national team. In 11 FIFA appearances, he scored three goals.

He also coached nine FIFA games, amassing a record of three wins, two draws and four losses. He made his debut at the 1985 inaugural FIFA U-16 World Championship in China; his team defeated the United States 1–0, advanced out of its group and placed fourth.

As of December 2013, Souleymane has been the Technical Director (Director Technique) of the Guinean Football Federation since 2004.
