= Abdallah Tazi =

Moroccan footballer (born 1944)

Personal information
- Full name: Abdallah Tazi
- Date of birth: 30 November 1944 (age 81)
- Place of birth: Morocco

Senior career*
Years	Team	Apps	(Gls)
1963–1983	MAS Fez	-	(-)

International career
1967–1978	Morocco	32	(5)
- * Club domestic league appearances and goals

Abdallah Tazi (Arabic: عبدالله تازي; born 30 November 1944), also transliterated Abdellah or Abdullah, is a Moroccan footballer who played for Morocco in the 1972 Summer Olympics and 1978 African Cup of Nations. He also played for Moghreb Athletic Club.
