= Morocco national football team results (1957–1989) =

This article lists the results of the Morocco national football team from 1957 to 1989.

Key
Win
Draw
Defeat

== 1950s ==
=== 1957 ===
19 October 1957 1957 Pan Arab Games GS	Morocco	3–3	Iraq	Beirut, Lebanon
				Stadium: Camille Chamoun Sports City Stadium

21 October 1957 1957 Pan Arab Games GS	Morocco	5–1	Libya	Beirut, Lebanon
	Benchekroun (?); Khalifi (?); Rhiad (?)		(?) Al-Safr	Stadium: Camille Chamoun Sports City Stadium

23 October 1957 1957 Pan Arab Games GS	Tunisia	1–3	Morocco	Beirut, Lebanon
	Touati (?)	Report	(?) Rhiad	Stadium: Camille Chamoun Sports City Stadium

26 October 1957 1957 Pan Arab Games SF	Syria	1–1 (Syria on lots)	Morocco	Beirut, Lebanon
	Kaoulakian (?)		(?) Rhiad	Stadium: Camille Chamoun Sports City Stadium

26 October 1957 1957 Pan Arab Games Third place	Lebanon	Cancelled (Morocco withdrew)	Morocco	Beirut, Lebanon
				Stadium: Camille Chamoun Sports City Stadium

=== 1958 ===
3 April 1958 Friendly	Morocco	3–1	Libya	Casablanca, Morocco
				Stadium: Stade Marcel Cerdan

9 May 1958 Friendly Tournament	Algeria	2–1	Morocco	Tunis, Tunisia

11 May 1958 Friendly Tournament	Morocco	2–1	Libya	Tunis, Tunisia

=== 1959 ===
1959 Friendly	Morocco	1–0	Syria	Casablanca, Morocco
				Stadium: Stade Marcel Cerdan

8 November 1959 1960 S.Olympics Q	Malta	2–2	Morocco	Gżira, Malta
	Dalli; Mackay		Benchekroun 57'; Benabadenahan 73'	Stadium: Empire Stadium

15 November 1959 1960 S.Olympics Q	Tunisia	2–0	Morocco	Tunis, Tunisia
	Henia 20', 32'			Stadium: Stade Géo André

13 December 1959 1960 S.Olympics Q	Morocco	2–1	Malta	Casablanca, Morocco
	Machiche 13'; Mourchid 42'		Dalli 30'	Stadium: Stade Marcel Cerdan; Referee: Señor Caballero (Spain)

27 December 1959 1960 S.Olympics Q	Morocco	3–1	Tunisia	Casablanca, Morocco
	Benchekroun 4', 73'; Mokhtatif 48'		Néji 27'	Stadium: Stade Marcel Cerdan

== 1960s ==
=== 1960 ===
1 January 1960 Friendly	Morocco	0–5	Yugoslavia	Casablanca, Morocco
			Mihajlović 27'; Kostić 38', 57' (pen.); Maravić 65'; Anković 78'	Stadium: Stade d'Honneur; Attendance: 7,000

30 October 1960 1962 WCQ	Morocco	2–1	Tunisia	Casablanca, Morocco
	Khalfi 33'; Azhar 60' (pen.)		Meddeb 43'	Stadium: Stade d'Honneur; Attendance: 12,000; Referee: Blanco Perez (Spain)

13 November 1960 1962 WCQ	Tunisia	2–1	Morocco	Tunis, Tunisia
	Chetali 47'; Tlemçani 60'		Chicha 64'	Stadium: Stade Géo André; Attendance: 10,000; Referee: Carl Erich Steiner (Austria)

11 December 1960 Friendly	Morocco	2–3	East Germany	Casablanca, Morocco
	Akesbi 51', 71'		Meyer 5'; Ducke 42'; Müller 70'	Stadium: Stade d'Honneur; Attendance: 20,000

=== 1961 ===
22 January 1961 1962 WCQ	Morocco	1–1 (a.e.t.) (Note: Morocco and Tunisia finished level on points, and a play-off on neutral ground was played to decide the winner. Morocco advanced to the Final Round by winning a coin toss.)	Tunisia	Palermo, Italy
	Azhar 36'		Kerrit 89'	Stadium: Stadio Renzo Barbera; Attendance: 12,000; Referee: Concetto Lo Bello (Italy)

2 April 1961 1962 WCQ	Ghana	0–0	Morocco	Accra, Ghana
				Stadium: Accra Sports Stadium; Referee: Hussein Fahmy (Egypt)

28 May 1961 1962 WCQ	Morocco	1–0	Ghana	Casablanca, Morocco
	Khalfi 37'			Stadium: Stade d'Honneur; Referee: Blanco Perez (Spain)

18 June 1961 Friendly	Yugoslavia	3–2	Morocco	Belgrade, Yugoslavia
	Mujić 47', 50'; Matus 79'		Mustapha 20'; Ali 39'	Stadium: JNA Stadion; Attendance: 20,000

21 June 1961 Friendly	East Germany	1–2	Morocco	Erfurt, East Germany
	Nöldner 68'		Mohammed 5'; Mohammed Baba 80'	Stadium: Georgij-Dimitroff-Stadion; Attendance: 25,000

3 September 1961 1961 Pan Arab Games	Morocco	1–0	Lebanon	Casablanca, Morocco
				Stadium: Stade d'Honneur

4 September 1961 1961 Pan Arab Games	Morocco	6–2	Libya	Casablanca, Morocco
				Stadium: Stade d'Honneur

6 September 1961 1961 Pan Arab Games	Morocco	13–1	Saudi Arabia	Casablanca, Morocco
				Stadium: Stade d'Honneur

8 September 1961 1961 Pan Arab Games	Morocco	3–1	Kuwait	Casablanca, Morocco
				Stadium: Stade d'Honneur

10 September 1961 1961 Pan Arab Games	Morocco	3–2; Awarded (Note: The United Arab Republic withdrew at 2-2.)	United Arab Republic	Casablanca, Morocco
				Stadium: Stade d'Honneur

12 November 1961 1962 WCQ Play-off	Morocco	0–1	Spain	Casablanca, Morocco
			Del Sol 80'	Stadium: Stade d'Honneur; Attendance: 26,000; Referee: Daniel Mellet (Switzerland)

23 November 1961 1962 WCQ Play-off	Spain	3–2	Morocco	Madrid, Spain
	Marcelino 12'; Di Stéfano 44'; Collar 58'		Riahi 40'; Azhar 64'	Stadium: Santiago Bernabéu; Attendance: 30,000; Referee: Cesare Jonni (Italy)

10 December 1961 Friendly	Morocco	2–0	East Germany	Casablanca, Morocco
	Azhar 22'; Jenaene 82'			Stadium: Stade d'Honneur; Attendance: 10,000

=== 1962 ===
11 February 1962 Friendly	Morocco	3–1	Switzerland	Casablanca, Morocco
	Mohammed; Mohammed; Lamari		Frosio	Stadium: Stade d'Honneur

15 April 1962 Friendly	Morocco	1–3	Poland	Casablanca, Morocco
	Ben Abdelkader 8'		Jarek 49'; Wilczek 74'; Brychczy 81'	Stadium: Stade d'Honneur; Attendance: 15,000; Referee: Gino Rigato (Italy)

30 September 1962 Friendly	Romania	4–0	Morocco	Bucharest, Romania
	Voinea 4', 84'; Ozon 13'; Seredai 58'			Stadium: Stadionul 23 August; Attendance: 45,000; Referee: Zivko Bajić (Yugoslavia)

11 October 1962 Friendly	Poland	1–1	Morocco	Warsaw, Poland
	Wilczek 61'		Ben Abdelkader 75'	Attendance: 17,000; Referee: Milan Fencl (Czechoslovakia)

23 December 1962 Friendly	Morocco	3–1	Romania	Casablanca, Morocco
	Mustafa 31'; Mohamed 34'; Mohamed Baba 44'		Constantin 29' (pen.)	Stadium: Stade d'Honneur; Referee: Daniel Zariquiegui Izco (Spain)

=== 1963 ===
13 January 1963 Friendly	Morocco	1–0	Switzerland	Casablanca, Morocco
	Tahir Mustapha			Stadium: Stade d'Honneur

28 February 1963 Friendly	Algeria	0–4	Morocco	Algiers, Algeria
				Stadium: Stade 5 Juillet 1962

3 March 1963 Friendly	Morocco	1–2	Hungary	Casablanca, Morocco
	Goal		Tichy; Fenyvesi	Stadium: Stade d'Honneur

16 June 1963 1963 AFCON Q	Tunisia	4–1	Morocco	Tunis, Tunisia
	Henia 22', 57'; Aleya 85'; Jedidi 88'		Mokhtatif 75'

2 July 1963 1963 AFCON Q	Morocco	4–2	Tunisia	Casablanca, Morocco
	Khalfi 10'; Bendayan 46'; Bettache 59' (pen.); Akesbi 78'		Henia 84'; Jedidi 62'	Stadium: Stade d'Honneur

16 October 1963 1964 S.Olympics Q	Nigeria	3–0	Morocco	Lagos, Nigeria
	Ekpe; Hamilton			Stadium: Surulere Stadium

16 November 1963 1964 S.Olympics Q	Morocco	4–1	Nigeria	Casablanca, Morocco
	Lamari 42', 89'; Owowon 59' ((o.g.)); Bendayan 66'		Hamilton 35'	Stadium: Stade d'Honneur

1 December 1963 Friendly	Morocco	1–1	Soviet Union	Casablanca, Morocco
	Sadni		Tibari 12' (o.g.)	Stadium: Stade d'Honneur; Attendance: 15,000

29 December 1963 Friendly	Morocco	1–4	West Germany	Casablanca, Morocco
	Ali		Konietzka; Schmidt; Kramer	Stadium: Stade d'Honneur

=== 1964 ===
29 February 1964 1964 Tripoli Fair Tournament	Lebanon	2–1	Morocco	Tripoli, Libya
				Stadium: Tripoli Stadium

March 1964 1964 Tripoli Fair Tournament	Libya	2–0	Morocco	Tripoli, Libya
				Stadium: Tripoli Stadium

March 1964 1964 Tripoli Fair Tournament	Malta	1–3	Morocco	Tripoli, Libya
		Report		Stadium: Tripoli Stadium

March 1964 1964 Tripoli Fair Tournament	Sudan	0–1	Morocco	Tripoli, Libya
				Stadium: Tripoli Stadium

24 March 1964 1964 S.Olympics Q	Morocco	2–1	Nigeria	Dakar, Senegal
				Stadium: Stade Demba Diop

24 May 1964 Friendly	Morocco	0–1	Uruguay	Casablanca, Morocco
			Castro	Stadium: Stade d'Honneur

10 May 1964 1964 S.Olympics Q	Ethiopia	0–1	Morocco	Addis Ababa, Ethiopia
			Bendayan 80'	Stadium: Haillé Selassié Stadium

24 May 1964 1964 S.Olympics Q	Morocco	1–0	Ethiopia	Casablanca, Morocco
	Bouachra 75'			Stadium: Stade d'Honneur

11 October 1964 1964 S.Olympics GS	Hungary	6–0	Morocco	Tokyo, Japan
14:00 UTC+	Bene 13', 38' (pen.), 70', 74', 78', 87'			Stadium: National Olympic Stadium; Attendance: 65,793; Referee: im Duk Chun (South Korea)

13 October 1964 1964 S.Olympics GS	Yugoslavia	3–1	Morocco	Yokohama, Japan
14:00 UTC+	Samardžić 8'; Belin 12', 59'	Report	Bouachra 2'	Stadium: Mitsuzawa Soccer Stadium; Attendance: 12,675; Referee: Hussein Imam (United Arab Emirates)

=== 1965 ===
12 March 1965 1965 Tripoli Fair Tournament	Morocco	2–0	Kuwait	Tripoli, Libya
				Stadium: Tripoli Stadium

14 March 1965 1965 Tripoli Fair Tournament	Morocco	0–0	Tunisia	Tripoli, Libya
				Stadium: Tripoli Stadium

19 March 1965 1965 Tripoli Fair Tournament	Libya	1–0	Morocco	Tripoli, Libya
				Stadium: Tripoli Stadium

31 October 1965 Friendly	Algeria	0–0	Morocco	Algiers, Algeria
				Stadium: Stade 5 Juillet 1962; Attendance: 18,000

=== 1966 ===
28 February 1966 Friendly	Morocco	1–0	Algeria	Casablanca, Morocco
			Goal	Stadium: Stade d'Honneur

12 March 1966 1966 Tripoli Fair Tournament	Libya	4–0	Morocco	Tripoli, Libya
				Stadium: Tripoli Stadium

15 March 1966 1966 Tripoli Fair Tournament	Morocco	1–0	Iraq	Tripoli, Libya
				Stadium: Tripoli Stadium

18 March 1966 1966 Tripoli Fair Tournament	Morocco	1–0	Tunisia	Tripoli, Libya
				Stadium: Tripoli Stadium

19 March 1966 1966 Tripoli Fair Tournament Final	Morocco	2–1	Iraq	Tripoli, Libya
				Stadium: Tripoli Stadium

24 November 1966 Friendly	Algeria	2–2	Morocco	Algiers, Algeria
				Stadium: Stade 5 Juillet 1962

15 December 1966 Friendly	Morocco	2–2	Algeria	Casablanca, Morocco
				Stadium: Stade d'Honneur

=== 1967 ===
31 January 1967 Friendly	Morocco	0–0	Algeria	Casablanca, Morocco
				Stadium: Stade d'Honneur

22 February 1967 Friendly	West Germany	5–1	Morocco	Karlsruhe, West Germany
	Zaczyk; Löhr; Heynckes; Ulsaß		Bouassa	Stadium: Wildparkstadion; Attendance: 38,000; Referee: Bruno De Marchi (Italy)

30 September 1967 Friendly	Morocco	2–0	Mali	Casablanca, Morocco
				Stadium: Stade d'Honneur

5 November 1967 1968 S.Olympics Q	Morocco	1–1	Tunisia	Casablanca, Morocco
	Hamidouch 54'		Chaïbi 25'	Stadium: Stade d'Honneur; Attendance: 20,000

26 November 1967 1968 S.Olympics Q	Tunisia	0–0 (Note: Morocco and Tunisia drew 1-1 on aggregate. Morocco advanced by lot.)	Morocco	Tunis, Tunisia
				Stadium: Stade El Menzah; Attendance: 25,000

=== 1968 ===
17 March 1968 Friendly	Morocco	0–0	Algeria	Casablanca, Morocco
				Stadium: Stade d'Honneur

9 June 1968 1968 S.Olympics Q	Morocco	1–1	Ghana	Casablanca, Morocco
	Ghandi 7'	Report	Attuquayefio 86'	Stadium: Stade d'Honneur

30 June 1968 1968 S.Olympics Q	Ghana	1–2 (Note: Morocco won 3-2 on aggregate and qualified, but withdrew after refusing to play against Israel in the 1968 Summer Olympics final tournament in Group C. As a result, Ghana replaced Morocco.)	Morocco	Accra, Ghana
	Goal	Report	Faras ?	Stadium: Accra Sports Stadium; Attendance: 40,000

3 November 1968 1970 WCQ	Morocco	1–0	Senegal	Casablanca, Morocco
	Benkhrif 72'	Report		Stadium: Stade d'Honneur; Referee: José María Ortiz de Mendíbil (Spain)

=== 1969 ===
5 January 1969 1970 WCQ	Senegal	2–1	Morocco	Dakar, Senegal
	Diéme 26'; Diop 32'	Report	Akesbi 14'	Stadium: Stade Demba Diop; Referee: Mamadou Mabel Ba Diarra (Mali)

9 February 1969 Friendly	Morocco	1–4	Hungary	Casablanca, Morocco
	Ghazouani		Páncsics; Dunai; Göröcs; Bene	Stadium: Stade d'Honneur

13 February 1969 1970 WCQ	Morocco	2–0	Senegal	Las Palmas, Spain
	Bamous 54'; Hafnaoui 60'	Report		Stadium: Estadio Union Deportivo; Referee: Gaspar Pintado Viu (Spain)

9 March 1969 1970 AFCON Q	Algeria	2–0	Morocco	Algiers, Algeria
	Khalem 10'; Natouri 20'			Stadium: 20 August Stadium; Attendance: 20,000; Referee: Moncef Ben Ali (Tunisia)

22 March 1969 1970 AFCON Q	Morocco	1–0	Algeria	Agadir, Morocco
	Maaroufi 83'			Stadium: Stade Al Inbiaâte; Attendance: 15,000; Referee: Moustapha N'Gom (Senegal)

27 April 1969 1970 WCQ	Tunisia	0–0	Morocco	Tunis, Tunisia
		Report		Stadium: Stade El Menzah; Attendance: 26,706; Referee: Michel Kitabdjian (France)

18 May 1969 1970 WCQ	Morocco	0–0 (a.e.t.)	Tunisia	Casablanca, Morocco
		Report		Stadium: Stade d'Honneur; Referee: Juan Gardeazábal Garay (Spain)

13 June 1969 1970 WCQ	Morocco	2–2 (a.e.t.) (Note: The aggregate score was tied 0–0, and a play-off on neutral ground was played to decide who would advance to the Final Round. Morocco advanced by winning a coin toss.)	Tunisia	Marseille, France
	Khanousi 27'; Jarir 53'	Report	Chaïbi 3'; Cheman 87'	Stadium: Stade Municipal; Attendance: 4,185; Referee: Michel Kitabdjian (France)

21 September 1969 1970 WCQ	Morocco	2–1	Nigeria	Casablanca, Morocco
	El Filali 50'; Faras 63'	Report	Lawal 53'	Stadium: Stade d'Honneur; Referee: Roger Mâchin (France)

10 October 1969 1970 WCQ	Sudan	0–0	Morocco	Khartoum, Sudan
		Report		Stadium: Khartoum Stadium; Attendance: 18,020; Referee: Ali Kandil (United Arab Republic)

26 October 1969 1970 WCQ	Morocco	3–0	Sudan	Casablanca, Morocco
	El Filali 41'; Jarir 76', 86'	Report		Stadium: Stade d'Honneur; Referee: Major George Lamptey (Ghana)

1 November 1969 Friendly	Algeria	1–0	Morocco	Algiers, Algeria
				Stadium: Stade du 5 Juillet 1962

8 November 1969 1970 WCQ	Nigeria	2–0	Morocco	Ibadan, Nigeria
	Lawal 67' (pen.); Okoye 82'	Report		Stadium: Liberty Stadium; Attendance: 11,156; Referee: Seyoum Tarekegn (Ethiopia)

28 December 1969 Friendly	Morocco	3–0	Bulgaria	Casablanca, Morocco
	Ghazouani; Maaroufi (pen.)	Report		Stadium: Stade d'Honneur; Attendance: 30,000

== 1970s ==
=== 1970 ===
3 June 1970 1970 FIFA World Cup GS	West Germany	2–1	Morocco	León, Mexico
16:00 UTC−6	Seeler 56'; Müller 80'	Report	Jarir 21'	Stadium: Estadio Nou Camp; Attendance: 12,942; Referee: Laurens van Ravens (Netherlands)

6 June 1970 1970 FIFA World Cup GS	Peru	3–0	Morocco	León, Mexico
16:00 UTC−6	Cubillas 65', 75'; Challe 67'	Report		Stadium: Estadio Nou Camp; Attendance: 13,537; Referee: Tofiq Bahramov (Soviet Union)

11 June 1970 1970 FIFA World Cup GS	Bulgaria	1–1	Morocco	León, Mexico
16:00 UTC−6	Zhechev 40'	Report	Ghazouani 61'	Stadium: Estadio Nou Camp; Attendance: 12,299; Referee: Antonio Ribeiro Saldanha (Portugal)

10 December 1970 1972 AFCON Q	Algeria	3–1	Morocco	Algiers, Algeria
	Khalem 46', 60', 80'		Bendayan 6'	Stadium: 20 August Stadium; Attendance: 20,000; Referee: Mahmoud Mostafa Kamel (United Arab Republic)

27 December 1970 1972 AFCON Q	Morocco	3–0	Algeria	Casablanca, Morocco
	Bamous 30'; Petchou 38'; Benkhrif 90+4'			Stadium: Stade d'Honneur; Attendance: 20,000; Referee: Moustapha N'Gom (Senegal)

=== 1971 ===
14 March 1971 1972 AFCON Q	Morocco	3–0	United Arab Republic	Casablanca, Morocco
	El Filali; Petchou; Bamous			Stadium: Stade d'Honneur; Attendance: 35,000

28 March 1971 1972 S.Olympics Q	Morocco	5–2	Niger	Casablanca, Morocco
	Faras 3', 79'; Bamous 18', 85'; Petchou 20'		Garba 47', 62'	Stadium: Stade d'Honneur

16 April 1971 1972 AFCON Q	United Arab Republic	3–2	Morocco	Cairo, United Arab Republic
	El-Shazly 40', 43'; Basry 52'		Bamous 50'; Aherdane 74'	Stadium: Cairo International Stadium

25 April 1971 1972 S.Olympics Q	Niger	1–3	Morocco	Niamey, Niger
	Boulay 44'		Faras 8'; Maâti 58'; Slimani 63'

11 September 1971 Friendly	Morocco	2–1	Mexico	Casablanca, Morocco
	Petchou 63'; Boujemâa 88'		Rodríguez 60'	Stadium: Stade d'Honneur

=== 1972 ===
17 February 1972 Friendly	Senegal	1–3	Morocco	Yaoundé, Cameroon

25 February 1972 1972 AFCON GS	Congo	1–1	Morocco	Douala, Cameroon
	Moukila 45'	Report	Faras 34'	Stadium: Stade de la Réunification; Referee: Alfred Olimba (Kenya)

27 February 1972 1972 AFCON GS	Morocco	1–1	Sudan	Douala, Cameroon
	Faras 32'	Report	Abdel-Nadief 49'	Stadium: Stade de la Réunification; Referee: Michael Wacka (Cameroon)

29 February 1972 1972 AFCON GS	Morocco	1–1	Zaire	Douala, Cameroon
	Faras 36'	Report	Mayanga 3'	Stadium: Stade de la Réunification; Referee: Robert Foiret (Mauritius)

23 April 1972 1972 S.Olympics Q	Tunisia	3–3	Morocco	Tunis, Tunisia
	Chakroun 8'; Lahzami 39'; Akid 88'		Zahraoui 20'; Faras 25'; Yaghcha 82'	Stadium: Stade El Menzah

30 April 1972 1972 S.Olympics Q	Morocco	2–1	Mali	Casablanca, Morocco
	Faras 2'; Yaghcha 35'		Diallo 13'	Stadium: Stade d'Honneur

14 May 1972 1972 S.Olympics Q	Morocco	0–0	Tunisia	Casablanca, Morocco
				Stadium: Stade d'Honneur

21 May 1972 1972 S.Olympics Q	Mali	1–4	Morocco	Bamako, Mali
	Maiga 20'		? 44' (o.g.); Faras 65'; Kala 83'; Tazi 89'

27 August 1972 1972 S.Olympics First Round	Morocco	0–0	United States	Augsburg, West Germany
		Report		Stadium: Rosenaustadion; Attendance: 4,000; Referee: Rudi Glöckner (East Germany)

29 August 1972 1972 S.Olympics First Round	West Germany	3–0	Morocco	Passau, West Germany
	Nickel 30' (pen.), 33' (pen.); Hitzfeld 53'	Report		Stadium: Dreiflüssestadion; Attendance: 16,000; Referee: Dogan Babacan (Turkey)

31 August 1972 1972 S.Olympics First Round	Morocco	6–0	Malaysia	Ingolstadt, West Germany
	Benkhrif 16'; Faras 19', 21', 25'; El Filali 56'; Tati 85'	Report		Stadium: ESV-Stadion; Attendance: 2,500; Referee: Károly Palotai (Hungary)

3 September 1972 1972 S.Olympics Second Round	Soviet Union	3–0	Morocco	Munich, West Germany
12:00	Semyonov 1'; Kolotov 15'; Elissev 69'	Report		Stadium: Olympic Stadium; Attendance: 55,000; Referee: Guillermo Velasquez (Colombia)

5 September 1972 1972 S.Olympics Second Round	Denmark	3–1	Morocco	Passau, West Germany
12:00	Bak 55', 83'; Printzlau 90'	Report	Merzaq 89'	Stadium: Dreiflüssestadion; Attendance: 3,500; Referee: Werner Winsemann (Canada)

8 September 1972 1972 S.Olympics Second Round	Poland	5–0	Morocco	Nuremberg, West Germany
12:00	Kmiecik 3'; Lubański 10'; Deyna 45' (pen.), 63'; Gadocha 53'	Report		Stadium: Frankenstadion; Attendance: 500; Referee: Francesco Francescon (Italy)

19 November 1972 1974 WCQ	Morocco	0–0	Senegal	Agadir, Morocco
		Report		Stadium: Stade Al Inbiaâte; Attendance: 10,650; Referee: Antonio Camacho Jiménez (Spain)

3 December 1972 1974 WCQ	Senegal	1–2	Morocco	Dakar, Senegal
	Diop 2'		Ghazouani 26'; Petchou 72'	Stadium: Stade Demba Diop; Attendance: 9,860; Referee: Major George Lamptey (Ghana)

=== 1973 ===
11 February 1973 1974 WCQ	Guinea	1–1	Morocco	Conakry, Guinea
	Souleymane 38'	Report	Petchou 22'	Stadium: Stade du 28 Septembre; Attendance: 2,200; Referee: Pierre Mutombo (Zaire)

25 February 1973 1974 WCQ	Morocco	2–0	Guinea	Tetouan, Morocco
	Faras 60', 68'	Report		Stadium: Stade Saniat Rmel; Attendance: 13,122; Referee: Marcel Edgar Bertin (Liberia)

20 May 1973 1974 WCQ	Ivory Coast	1–1	Morocco	Abidjan, Ivory Coast
	Kobinam 75'	Report	Acila 30'	Stadium: Stade Félix Houphouët-Boigny; Attendance: 25,000; Referee: Badara N'Diaye (Senegal)

3 June 1973 1974 WCQ	Morocco	4–1	Ivory Coast	Tetouan, Morocco
	Faras 24', 34'; Fetoui 60'; Petchou 85'	Report	Pokou 61'	Stadium: Stade Saniat Rmel; Attendance: 11,000; Referee: Ahmed Khelifi (Algeria)

21 October 1973 1974 WCQ	Zambia	4–0	Morocco	Lusaka, Zambia
	Sinyangwe 17', 90'; Simwala 43'; Chanda 61'	Report		Stadium: 7 April Stadium; Attendance: 37,239; Referee: Gebreyesus Tesfaye (Ethiopia)

25 November 1973 1974 WCQ	Morocco	2–0	Zambia	Tetouan, Morocco
	Maghfour 14'; Faras 70'	Report		Stadium: Stade Saniat Rmel; Attendance: 5,456; Referee: Mohamed Diab Al-Attar (Egypt)

9 December 1973 1974 WCQ	Zaire	3–0	Morocco	Kinshasa, Zaire
	Kembo 58', 61'; Ekofo 79'	Report		Stadium: Stade du 20 Mai; Attendance: 70,000; Referee: Major George Lamptey (Ghana)

25 November 1973 1974 WCQ	Morocco	0–2 (w/o) (Note: Morocco withdrew from the competition before this match. Accordingly, FIFA awarded Zaire a 2–0 win on walkover.)	Zaire	Tetouan, Morocco
		Report		Stadium: Stade Saniat Rmel

=== 1974 ===
22 February 1974 Friendly	Iraq	0–0	Morocco	Baghdad, Iraq

24 February 1974 Friendly	Iraq	0–0	Morocco	Baghdad, Iraq

26 February 1974 Friendly	Kuwait	2–0	Morocco	Kuwait City, Kuwait

1 March 1974 Friendly	Bahrain	0–1	Morocco	Manama, Bahrain

6 March 1974 Friendly	Saudi Arabia	0–0	Morocco	Riyadh, Saudi Arabia

7 April 1974 Friendly	Morocco	2–0	Algeria	Casablanca, Morocco
	Haddadi; Ahmed

27 September 1974 1974 Kuneitra Cup GS	Morocco	2–1	Jordan	Damascus, Syria
	Ismail (o.g.); Faras		Al-Tali	Stadium: Abbasiyyin Stadium

29 September 1974 1974 Kuneitra Cup GS	Morocco	4–2	Egypt B	Damascus, Syria
	Dish; El Safawi; Makrouh		Rushdie; Mostafa	Stadium: Abbasiyyin Stadium

1 October 1974 1974 Kuneitra Cup GS	Morocco	3–1	Tunisia	Damascus, Syria
	Faras; Safawi		Habita	Stadium: Abbasiyyin Stadium

3 October 1974 1974 Kuneitra Cup GS	Morocco	3–0	Lebanon	Damascus, Syria
	Al-Safawi; Ahmed; Hardan			Stadium: Abbasiyyin Stadium

5 October 1974 1974 Kuneitra Cup GS	Morocco	1–0	(Algeria) NA Hussein Dey	Damascus, Syria
	Faras			Stadium: Abbasiyyin Stadium

7 October 1974 1974 Kuneitra Cup SF	Morocco	2–0	Sudan	Damascus, Syria
	Dish; Ahmed			Stadium: Abbasiyyin Stadium

9 October 1974 1974 Kuneitra Cup Final	Syria	1–1 (a.e.t.) (3–4 p)	Morocco	Damascus, Syria
	Goutouq		Faras	Stadium: Abbasiyyin Stadium
	Penalties
	Tatish (penalty scored); Mahalmi (penalty scored); Al-Nimr (penalty scored)		(penalty scored) Najah; (penalty scored) Al-Safawi; (penalty scored) Faras; (penalty scored) Dish

24 November 1974 1976 AFCON Q	Morocco	3–0	Gambia	Casablanca, Morocco
	Guezzar ? ?			Stadium: Stade d'Honneur

7 December 1974 1976 AFCON Q	Gambia	0–3	Morocco	Banjul, Gambia
			Guezzar ? ?

=== 1975 ===
23 February 1975 1976 S.Olympics Q	Morocco	2–1	Libya	Casablanca, Morocco
	Faras 3'; Acila 77'	Report	Goal	Stadium: Stade d'Honneur

2 March 1975 Friendly	Morocco	0–0	Tunisia	Rabat, Morocco

14 March 1975 1976 S.Olympics Q	Libya	0–1	Morocco	Benghazi, Libya
		Report	Goal	Stadium: March 28 Stadium

22 March 1975 1976 AFCON Q	Morocco	4–0	Senegal	Fez, Morocco
	Faras 30'; Acila; Guezzar; Najah			Stadium: Stade Hassan II

13 April 1975 1976 AFCON Q	Senegal	2–1	Morocco	Kaolack, Senegal
	?		Faras

29 June 1975 1976 AFCON Q	Ghana	2–0	Morocco	Accra, Ghana
	Owusu 59'; Sam 90'			Stadium: Accra Sports Stadium

13 July 1975 1976 AFCON Q	Morocco	2–0 (6–5 p)	Ghana	Casablanca, Morocco
	Chebbak; Acila 89'			Stadium: Stade d'Honneur

30 November 1975 1976 S.Olympics Q	Tunisia	0–1	Morocco	Tunis, Tunisia
		Report	Zahraoui 8'	Stadium: Stade El Menzah

14 December 1975 1976 S.Olympics Q	Morocco	1–0	Tunisia	Casablanca, Morocco
	Faras 15'	Report		Stadium: Stade d'Honneur

=== 1976 ===
1 March 1976 1976 AFCON First Round	Morocco	2–2	Sudan	Dire Dawa, Ethiopia
	Chérif 1'; Abouali 58'		Gagarin 9', 79' (pen.)	Stadium: Dire Dawa Stadium; Referee: Gratian Matovu (Tanzania)

4 March 1976 1976 AFCON First Round	Morocco	1–0	Zaire	Dire Dawa, Ethiopia
	Zahraoui 80'			Stadium: Dire Dawa Stadium; Referee: Yousef Alghoul (Libya)

6 March 1976 1976 AFCON First Round	Morocco	3–1	Nigeria	Dire Dawa, Ethiopia
	Faras 8'; Tazi 19'; Chebbak 81'		Ojebode 81'	Stadium: Dire Dawa Stadium; Attendance: 4,000; Referee: Bernard Grah (Ivory Coast)

9 March 1976 1976 AFCON Final Round	Morocco	2–1	Egypt	Addis Ababa, Ethiopia
	Faras 23'; Zahraoui 88'		Abou Rehab 34'	Stadium: Addis Ababa Stadium; Attendance: 10,000; Referee: Yousef Alghoul (Libya)

11 March 1976 1976 AFCON Final Round	Morocco	2–1	Nigeria	Addis Ababa, Ethiopia
	Faras 82'; Guezzar 87'		Mohammed 57'	Stadium: Addis Ababa Stadium; Referee: Youssou N'Diaye (Senegal)

14 March 1976 1976 AFCON Final Round	Guinea	1–1	Morocco	Addis Ababa, Ethiopia
	Souleymane 33'		Baba 86'	Stadium: Addis Ababa Stadium; Attendance: 30,000; Referee: Nyirenda Chayu (Zambia)

3 April 1976 1976 S.Olympics Q	Nigeria	3–1	Morocco	Lagos, Nigeria
	Usiyan 14', 48'; Emeteole 80'	Report	Petchou	Stadium: Surulere Stadium

18 April 1976 1976 S.Olympics Q	Morocco	1–0	Nigeria	Tanger, Morocco
	Acila 53'	Report		Stadium: Stade de Marchan

8 October 1976 1976 Pan Arab Games	Morocco	3–0	Palestine	Damascus, Syria
		Report

10 October 1976 1976 Pan Arab Games	Morocco	0–0	Saudi Arabia	Damascus, Syria
				Stadium: Abbasiyyin Stadium

12 October 1976 1976 Pan Arab Games	Morocco	3–0	Jordan	Damascus, Syria
	Amcharrat; Smiri			Stadium: Abbasiyyin Stadium

14 October 1976 1976 Pan Arab Games	Morocco	4–0	South Yemen	Damascus, Syria
	Amcharrat; Zahraoui; Shaita			Stadium: Abbasiyyin Stadium

16 October 1976 1976 Pan Arab Games	Morocco	2–0	Mauritania	Damascus, Syria
	Zahraoui			Stadium: Abbasiyyin Stadium

18 October 1976 1976 Pan Arab Games	Syria	0–0	Morocco	Damascus, Syria
				Stadium: Abbasiyyin Stadium

12 December 1976 1978 WCQ	Morocco	1–1	Tunisia	Casablanca, Morocco
	Lakhal 35'		Dhiab 56'	Stadium: Stade Père Jégo; Attendance: 13,056; Referee: Franz Wöhrer (Austria)

=== 1977 ===
9 January 1977 1978 WCQ	Tunisia	1–1 (Note: Morocco and Tunisia tied 2-2 on aggregate. Tunisia won 4-2 on penalties in the second leg to advance to the Second Round. This was the first penalty shootout in a World Cup match.) (4–2 p)	Morocco	Tunis, Tunisia
	Labidi 34'		Tahir 55'	Stadium: Stade El Menzah; Attendance: 44,500; Referee: Walter Hungerbühler (Switzerland)

23 March 1977 Friendly	Syria	0–2	Morocco	Damascus, Syria
			Goal	Stadium: Abbasiyyin Stadium

6 April 1977 Friendly	Morocco	5–1	Gabon	Rabat, Morocco
			Goal	Stadium: Stade de FUS

26 May 1977 Friendly	Senegal	2–3	Morocco	Dakar, Senegal
	Goal		Goal	Stadium: Stade Demba Diop

=== 1978 ===
26 February 1978 Friendly	Morocco	2–3	Soviet Union	Marrakesh, Morocco
	Goal		Blokhin 15'; Konkov 36'; Chesnokov 71'	Stadium: Stade El Harti; Attendance: 15,000

6 March 1978 1978 AFCON GS	Morocco	1–1	Tunisia	Kumasi, Ghana
	Acila 29'		Kaabi 63'	Stadium: Kumasi Sports Stadium; Referee: Gebreyesus Tesfaye (Ethiopia)

9 March 1978 1978 AFCON GS	Morocco	1–0	Congo	Kumasi, Ghana
	Acila 28'			Stadium: Kumasi Sports Stadium; Attendance: 50,000; Referee: Youssou N'Diaye (Senegal)

11 March 1978 1978 AFCON GS	Uganda	3–0	Morocco	Kumasi, Ghana
	Kisitu 13'; Nsereko 32'; Omondi 36'			Stadium: Kumasi Sports Stadium; Attendance: 20,000; Referee: Théophile Lawson-Hétchéli (Togo)

=== 1979 ===
18 February 1979 1980 AFCON Q	Mauritania	2–2	Morocco	Nouakchott, Mauritania
	Lamine (pen.)		Anafal; Belhiouane

8 April 1979 1980 AFCON Q	Morocco	4–1	Mauritania	Casablanca, Morocco
	Faras; Saber; Acila; Anafal		Diop	Stadium: Stade d'Honneur

15 April 1979 1980 S.Olympics Q	Morocco	1–0	Senegal	Casablanca, Morocco
	Acila			Stadium: Stade d'Honneur

29 April 1979 1980 S.Olympics Q	Senegal	1–0 (5–6 p)	Morocco	Dakar, Senegal
	Camara			Stadium: Stade Demba Diop

24 June 1979 1980 AFCON Q	Morocco	7–0	Togo	Mohammedia, Morocco
	Faras 9'; Acila 16'; Dolmy 44'; Jebrane 54', 70', 86'; Labied 80'			Stadium: Stade El Bachir

6 July 1979 1980 AFCON Q	Togo	2–1	Morocco	Lomé, Togo
	Goal		Beggar

9 December 1979 1980 S.Olympics Q	Morocco	1–5	Algeria	Casablanca, Morocco
	Limane 32' (pen.)		Bensaoula 15', 16', 69'; Guemri 71'; Assad 87'	Stadium: Stade d'Honneur; Attendance: 50,000; Referee: Alberto Michelotti (Italy)

21 December 1979 1980 S.Olympics Q	Algeria	3–0	Morocco	Algiers, Algeria
	Belloumi 40'; Kouici 46'; Assad 75'			Stadium: Stade 5 Juillet 1962; Attendance: 30,000; Referee: Erich Linemayr (Austria)

== 1980s ==
=== 1980 ===
12 February 1980 Friendly	Ivory Coast	4–4	Morocco	Abidjan, Ivory Coast

27 February 1980 Friendly	Morocco	0–0	Tunisia	Meknes, Morocco
				Stadium: Stade d'Honneur

9 March 1980 1980 AFCON GS	Morocco	1–1	Guinea	Ibadan, Nigeria
	Mustapha 7'		M. Camara 8'	Stadium: Liberty Stadium

13 March 1980 1980 AFCON GS	Algeria	1–0	Morocco	Ibadan, Nigeria
	Belloumi 90+3'			Stadium: Liberty Stadium; Attendance: 20,000; Referee: Ali Dridi (Tunisia)

16 March 1980 1980 AFCON GS	Morocco	1–0	Ghana	Ibadan, Nigeria
	Labied 44'			Stadium: Liberty Stadium; Attendance: 20,000; Referee: Dodou N'Jie (Gambia)

16 March 1980 1980 AFCON SF	Nigeria	1–0	Morocco	Lagos, Nigeria
	Owolabi 9'			Stadium: Surulere Stadium; Attendance: 70,000; Referee: Suleiman El Naim (Sudan)

21 March 1980 1980 AFCON Third place	Morocco	2–0	Egypt	Lagos, Nigeria
	Labied 9', 78'			Stadium: Surulere Stadium; Attendance: 5,000; Referee: Ngesa Gabriel Odengo (Kenya)

8 June 1980 Friendly	Tunisia	0–1	Morocco	Tunis, Tunisia
			Idriss	Stadium: Stade El Menzah

22 June 1980 1982 WCQ	Senegal	0–1	Morocco	Dakar, Senegal
			Timoumi 21'	Stadium: Stade de l'Amitié; Attendance: 7,872; Referee: Aissaoui Boudabbous (Tunisia)

6 July 1980 1982 WCQ	Morocco	0–0	Senegal	Casablanca, Morocco
				Stadium: Stade d'Honneur; Referee: Koudou Poll (Ivory Coast)

15 October 1980 1980 Merdeka Tournament	Morocco	2–2	Burma	Kuala Lumpur, Malaysia
				Stadium: Stadium Merdeka

20 October 1980 1980 Merdeka Tournament	South Korea	1–1	Morocco	Kuala Lumpur, Malaysia
				Stadium: Stadium Merdeka

22 October 1980 1980 Merdeka Tournament	Thailand	1–2	Morocco	Kuala Lumpur, Malaysia
				Stadium: Stadium Merdeka

24 October 1980 1980 Merdeka Tournament	Malaysia	2–0	Morocco	Kuala Lumpur, Malaysia
				Stadium: Stadium Merdeka

26 October 1980 1980 Merdeka Tournament	New Zealand	0–3	Morocco	Kuala Lumpur, Malaysia
				Stadium: Stadium Merdeka

27 October 1980 1980 Merdeka Tournament	Morocco	3–0	Kuwait	Kuala Lumpur, Malaysia
				Stadium: Stadium Merdeka

29 October 1980 1980 Merdeka Tournament	Morocco	2–0	Indonesia	Kuala Lumpur, Malaysia
				Stadium: Stadium Merdeka

2 November 1980 1980 Merdeka Tournament (Final)	Malaysia	1–2	Morocco	Kuala Lumpur, Malaysia
				Stadium: Stadium Merdeka

3 November 1980 Friendly	Singapore	0–1	Morocco	Singapore
				Stadium: Jalan Besar Stadium

16 November 1980 1982 WCQ	Morocco	2–0	Zambia	Fez, Morocco
	Boussati 30'; Limane 34'			Stadium: Stade Hassan II; Attendance: 6,375; Referee: Ali Bin Nasser (Tunisia)

30 November 1980 1982 WCQ	Zambia	2–0 (4–5 p)	Morocco	Lusaka, Zambia
	Musonda 60'; Phiri 78'			Stadium: Independence Stadium; Attendance: 6,334; Referee: Gebreysus Tesfaye (Ethiopia)

=== 1981 ===
7 February 1981 Friendly	Morocco	1–1	Malaysia	Abu Dhabi, United Arab Emirates
	Goal		Goal

15 February 1981 Friendly	Morocco	3–0	Syria	Fez, Morocco
	Goal			Stadium: Stade Hassan II

8 March 1981 Friendly	Morocco	1–1	Iraq	Fez, Morocco
	Goal		Goal	Stadium: Stade Hassan II

22 March 1981 1982 AFCON Q	Morocco	3–1	Liberia	Fez, Morocco
	Boussati		Goal	Stadium: Stade Hassan II; Referee: Bakary Sarr (Senegal)

4 April 1981 1982 AFCON Q	Liberia	0–5	Morocco	Monrovia, Liberia
			Goal	Referee: Benjamin Dwomoh (Ghana)

26 April 1981 1982 WCQ	Morocco	1–0	Egypt	Casablanca, Morocco
	Daidi 44'			Stadium: Stade d'Honneur; Referee: Nyrenda Chayu (Zambia)

8 May 1981 1982 WCQ	Egypt	0–0	Morocco	Cairo, Egypt
				Stadium: Nasser Stadium; Attendance: 100,000; Referee: Cheikh M'Baye (Senegal)

16 August 1981 1982 AFCON Q	Morocco	2–1	Zambia	Fez, Morocco
	Limane; Boussati 77'		Chola	Stadium: Stade Hassan II

30 August 1981 1982 AFCON Q	Zambia	2–0	Morocco	Lusaka, Zambia
	? Kaumba

27 September 1981 Friendly	Morocco	2–2	Tunisia	Rabat, Morocco
	Goal		Goal

1 November 1981 Friendly	Senegal	2–0	Morocco	Dakar, Senegal
	Goal			Stadium: Stade Demba Diop

15 November 1981 1982 WCQ	Morocco	0–2	Cameroon	Kenitra, Morocco
			Milla 15' (pen.); Tokoto 40'	Stadium: Stade Municipal; Referee: Cheikh M'Baye (Senegal)

29 November 1981 1982 WCQ	Cameroon	2–1	Morocco	Yaoundé, Cameroon
	Aoudou 15' (pen.); Milla 47'		Yaghcha 25' (pen.)	Stadium: Stade Ahmadou Ahidjo; Attendance: 70,000; Referee: Hussein Fahmy Bahig (Egypt)

=== 1982 ===
21 June 1982 Friendly	Morocco	3–3	Kuwait	Rabat, Morocco
	Dahane; A. Taissir		Al-Dakhil; Al-Buloushi

23 July 1982 1982 Beijing International Friendship Tournament GS	China	3–3	Morocco	Beijing, China PR
	Xu; Chen; Zhao		Goal	Stadium: Beijing Worker’s Stadium; Referee: Shunsaku Nakanishi (Japan)

25 July 1982 1982 Beijing International Friendship Tournament GS	Hong Kong	0–0	Morocco	Beijing, China PR
				Stadium: Beijing Worker’s Stadium; Referee: Zhang Daqiao (China PR)

27 July 1982 1982 Beijing International Friendship Tournament SF	Morocco	1–0	Algeria U-21	Beijing, China PR
				Stadium: Beijing Worker’s Stadium; Referee: Zhou Guangda (China PR)

30 July 1982 1982 Beijing International Friendship Tournament Final	Morocco	0–0 (5–4 p)	(Socialist Federal Republic of Yugoslavia) FK Željezničar Sarajevo	Beijing, China PR
				Stadium: Beijing Worker’s Stadium; Referee: Zhang Daqiao (China PR)

3 October 1982 Friendly	Saudi Arabia	2–1	Morocco	Riyadh, Saudi Arabia
	Goal		Goal

=== 1983 ===
9 March 1983 Friendly	Senegal	1–0	Morocco	Dakar, Senegal
	Goal			Stadium: Stade de l'Amitié

23 March 1983 Friendly	Tunisia	1–0	Morocco	Sousse, Tunisia
	Goal

10 April 1983 1984 AFCON Q	Morocco	4–0	Mali	Casablanca, Morocco
	Krimau; Souadi ?

24 April 1983 1984 AFCON Q	Mali	2–0	Morocco	Bamako, Mali
	Goal

15 May 1983 1984 S.Olympics Q	Guinea	0–0	Morocco	Conakry, Guinea
		Report		Stadium: Stade du 28 Septembre; Attendance: 25,000; Referee: Iyoubi (Cameroon)

29 May 1983 1984 S.Olympics Q	Morocco	3–0	Guinea	Casablanca, Morocco
	Krimau 5'	Report		Stadium: Stade Mohammed V

14 August 1983 1984 AFCON Q	Nigeria	0–0	Morocco	Benin City, Nigeria

28 August 1983 1984 AFCON Q	Morocco	0–0 (3–4 p)	Nigeria	Rabat, Morocco

25 September 1983 1984 S.Olympics Q	Morocco	1–0	Senegal	Casablanca, Morocco
	El Haddaoui (pen.)	Report		Stadium: Stade Mohammed V

9 October 1983 1984 S.Olympics Q	Senegal	1–1	Morocco	Dakar, Senegal
	Goal	Report	Souadi (pen.)	Stadium: Stade Demba Diop

9 September 1983 1983 Mediterranean Games GS	Morocco	0–0	Greece Ol.	Casablanca, Morocco
				Stadium: Stade Mohammed V

13 September 1983 1983 Mediterranean Games GS	Morocco	2–0	Libya	Casablanca, Morocco
	El Haddaoui; Khalifa			Stadium: Stade Mohammed V

15 September 1983 1983 Mediterranean Games SF	Morocco	2–1	Egypt	Casablanca, Morocco
16:00 UTC+0	El Haddaoui		Youssef 54'	Stadium: Stade Mohammed V

17 September 1983 1983 Mediterranean Games Final	Morocco	3–0	Turkey	Casablanca, Morocco
18:00 UTC+0	El Haddaoui 25'; Souadi 45'; Labied 80'			Stadium: Stade Mohammed V Attendance: 45,000; Referee: Cárcel (Spain)

=== 1984 ===
15 January 1984 Friendly	Ivory Coast	3–3	Morocco	Abidjan, Ivory Coast

5 February 1984 Friendly	Morocco	1–1	Bulgaria	Casablanca, Morocco
	Khalifa 62' (pen.)		Mladenov 49'	Stadium: Stade Mohamed V Attendance: 47,500

11 February 1984 1984 S.Olympics Q	Nigeria	0–0	Morocco	Lagos, Nigeria
		Report		Stadium: Surulere Stadium

26 February 1984 1984 S.Olympics Q	Morocco	0–0 (4–3 p)	Nigeria	Casablanca, Morocco
		Report		Stadium: Stade Mohammed V

23 June 1984 Friendly	Morocco	2–1	Senegal	Casablanca, Morocco
	Goal		Goal	Stadium: Stade Mohamed V

30 June 1984 1986 FIFA World Cup Q	Sierra Leone	0–1	Morocco	Freetown, Sierra Leone
			M. Merry 87'	Stadium: Siaka Steven Stadium; Referee: Luc Agbala (Togo)

15 July 1984 1986 FIFA World Cup Q	Morocco	4–0	Sierra Leone	Rabat, Morocco
	M. Merry 34', 77'; Dahane 51' (pen.); Labied 81'			Stadium: Moulay Abdellah Stadium; Referee: Badara Sene (Senegal)

30 July 1984 1984 S.Olympics GS	West Germany	2–0	Morocco	Stanford, United States
	Rahn 43'; Brehme 52'	Report		Stadium: Stanford Stadium; Attendance: 23,228; Referee: Tony Evangelista (CAN)

1 August 1984 1984 S.Olympics GS	Morocco	1–0	Saudi Arabia	Pasadena, United States
	Merry 72'	Report		Stadium: Rose Bowl; Attendance: 36,909; Referee: Edvard Šoštarič (YUG)

3 August 1984 1984 S.Olympics GS	Morocco	0–2	Brazil	Pasadena, United States
		Report	Dunga 64'; Kita 70'	Stadium: Rose Bowl; Attendance: 49,355; Referee: Arminio Victoriano Sánchez (ESP)

24 October 1984 Friendly	Morocco	3–2	Canada	Rabat, Morocco
	El Haddaoui; Samba		Paul James; Colin Miller	Stadium: Stade Moulay Abdellah

=== 1985 ===
2 January 1985 Friendly	Libya	0–0	Morocco	Tripoli, Libya
				Stadium: June 11 Stadium

22 January 1985 1985 Nehru Cup GS	Morocco	4–0	Algeria	Cochin, India
	Benhaky 12'; El-Biyaz 44'; Timoumi 56'; Dahan 64'			Stadium: Maharajah College Stadium

26 January 1985 1985 Nehru Cup GS	Morocco	2–2	South Korea	Cochin, India
	Timoumi 29'; El-Biyaz 78'		Kim 7'; Choi 51'	Stadium: Maharajah College Stadium

31 January 1985 1985 Nehru Cup GS	India	0–1	Morocco	Cochin, India
			Rajhi 34'	Stadium: Maharajah College Stadium

2 February 1985 1985 Nehru Cup SF	Morocco	0–1	Soviet Union	Cochin, India
			Dmitriev 22'	Stadium: Maharajah College Stadium

7 April 1985 1986 WCQ	Morocco	2–0	Malawi	Rabat, Morocco
	El Haddaoui 10'; Dahane 75' (pen.)			Stadium: Moulay Abdellah Stadium; Attendance: 20,862; Referee: Ali Bin Nasser (Tunisia)

21 April 1985 1986 FIFA WCQ	Malawi	0–0	Morocco	Blantyre, Malawi
				Stadium: Kamuzu Stadium; Attendance: 50,000; Referee: Nyrenda Chayu (Zambia)

4 August 1985 1985 Pan Arab Games GS	Morocco	3–0	Somalia	Rabat, Morocco
	Timoumi; Laghrissi			Stadium: Stade Moulay Abdellah

7 August 1985 1985 Pan Arab Games GS	Morocco	2–2	Tunisia	Rabat, Morocco
	? 55' (o.g.); Anafal 69'		Rakbaoui 4'; Hergal 7'	Stadium: Stade Moulay Abdellah

10 August 1985 1985 Pan Arab Games GS	Morocco	3–0	Mauritania	Rabat, Morocco
				Stadium: Stade Moulay Abdellah

13 August 1985 1985 Pan Arab Games SF	Morocco	1–0 (a.e.t.)	Algeria B	Rabat, Morocco
	Lamriss (?)			Stadium: Stade Moulay Abdellah

16 August 1985 1985 Pan Arab Games Final	Morocco	0–1	Iraq	Rabat, Morocco
			Gorgis 8'	Stadium: Stade Moulay Abdellah; Attendance: 48,000; Referee: Amar Gothari (Algeria)

12 July 1985 1986 WCQ	Egypt	0–0	Morocco	Cairo, Egypt
				Stadium: Cairo International Stadium; Referee: Frank Valdemarca (Zimbabwe)

28 July 1985 1986 WCQ	Morocco	2–0	Egypt	Casablanca, Morocco
	Timoumi 37'; Bouderbala 82'			Stadium: Stade Mohamed V Referee: Badara Sène (Senegal)

6 October 1985 1986 WCQ	Morocco	3–0	Libya	Casablanca, Morocco
	Merry 44' (pen.); Timoumi 85'; Bouderbala 90'			Stadium: Stade Mohamed V Referee: Nyrenda Chayu (Zambia)

18 October 1985 1986 WCQ	Libya	1–0	Morocco	Benghazi, Libya
	Al-Farjani 43'			Stadium: 28 March Stadium; Referee: Luigi Agnolin (Italy)

25 August 1985 1986 AFCON Q	Morocco	1–0	Zaire	Casablanca, Morocco
	Merry 46' (pen.)			Stadium: Stade Mohammed V

8 September 1985 1986 AFCON Q	Zaire	0–0	Morocco	Lubumbashi, Zaire
				Stadium: Stade Municipal

=== 1986 ===
19 February 1986 Friendly	Morocco	0–0	Bulgaria	Rabat, Morocco
				Stadium: Stade Moulay Abdellah; Attendance: 22,000

8 March 1986 1986 AFCON GS	Algeria	0–0	Morocco	Alexandria, Egypt
				Stadium: Alexandria Stadium; Attendance: 12,000; Referee: Ali Bennaceur (Tunisia)

11 March 1986 1986 AFCON GS	Cameroon	1–1	Morocco	Alexandria, Egypt
	Milla 89'		Krimau 63'	Stadium: Alexandria Stadium; Attendance: 8,000; Referee: Frank Valdemarca (Zimbabwe)

14 March 1986 1986 AFCON GS	Morocco	1–0	Zambia	Alexandria, Egypt
	Chilengi 18' (o.g.)			Stadium: Alexandria Stadium; Attendance: 5,000; Referee: Simon Bantsimba (Congo)

17 March 1986 1986 AFCON SF	Egypt	1–0	Morocco	Cairo, Egypt
	Abouzaid 79'			Stadium: Cairo International Stadium; Attendance: 95,000; Referee: Gebreyesus Tesfaye (Ethiopia)

20 March 1986 1986 AFCON Third place	Ivory Coast	3–2	Morocco	Cairo, Egypt
	Ben Salah 8'; Kassi-Kouadio 38', 68' (pen.)		Rhiati 44'; Sahil 85'	Stadium: Cairo International Stadium; Attendance: 1,000; Referee: Frank Valdemarca (Zimbabwe)

23 April 1986 Friendly	Northern Ireland	2–1	Morocco	Belfast, Northern Ireland
	Clarke 13'; Quinn 85'		Timoumi 65' (pen.)	Stadium: Windsor Park; Attendance: 12 000

2 June 1986 1986 FIFA World Cup GS	Morocco	0–0	Poland	Monterrey, Mexico
16:00 UTC−6		Report		Stadium: Estadio Universitario; Attendance: 19,900; Referee: José Luis Martínez Bazán (Uruguay)

6 June 1986 1986 FIFA World Cup GS	England	0–0	Morocco	Monterrey, Mexico
16:00 UTC−6		Report		Stadium: Estadio Tecnológico; Attendance: 20,200; Referee: Gabriel González (Paraguay)

11 June 1986 1986 FIFA World Cup GS	Portugal	1–3	Morocco	Zapopan, Mexico
16:00 UTC−6	Diamantino 80'	Report	Khairi 19', 26'; Merry Krimau 62'	Stadium: Estadio Tres de Marzo; Attendance: 28,000; Referee: Alan Snoddy (Northern Ireland)

17 June 1986 1986 FIFA World Cup R16	Morocco	0–1	West Germany	Monterrey, Mexico
16:00 UTC−6		Report	Matthäus 87'	Stadium: Estadio Universitario; Attendance: 19,800; Referee: Zoran Petrović (Yugoslavia)

=== 1987 ===
9 June 1987 1987 President's Cup	Morocco	0–1	Australia	Gangneung, South Korea
13:30 UTC+9			Farina 55'	Stadium: Gangneung Stadium

11 June 1987 1987 President's Cup	Morocco	0–1	South Korea B	Gyeongju, South Korea
17:10 UTC+9			Ham Hyun-gi 64'	Stadium: Gyeongju Civic Stadium

13 June 1987 1987 President's Cup	Fortuna Sittard (Netherlands)	3–2	Morocco	Daegu, South Korea
17:50 UTC+9				Stadium: Daegu Civic Stadium

15 June 1987 1987 President's Cup	Shamrock Rovers (Republic of Ireland)	0–1	Morocco	Suwon, South Korea
15:20 UTC+9			Mohamed 72'	Stadium: Suwon Sports Complex

17 June 1987 1987 President's Cup	Morocco	3–1	Chile B	Incheon, South Korea
15:20 UTC+9	Khairi (?); Laghrissi (?)		González (?)	Stadium: Incheon Sungui Stadium

29 July 1987 Friendly	Liberia	2–1	Morocco	Monrovia, Liberia
	Goal		Goal	Stadium: Samuel Kanyon Doe Sports Complex

1 November 1987 1988 S.Olympics Q	Ivory Coast	0–0	Morocco	Abidjan, Ivory Coast
				Stadium: Stade Félix Houphouët-Boigny; Referee: Simon Bantsimba (Congo)

15 November 1987 1988 S.Olympics Q	Morocco	2–1	Ivory Coast	Casablanca, Morocco
	El Haddaoui 28' (pen.); El Biyaz 86'		Turbo 78'	Stadium: Stade Mohammed V Referee: Abderrahmane Bergui (Algeria)

=== 1988 ===
17 January 1988 1988 S.Olympics Q	Tunisia	1–0	Morocco	Tunis, Tunisia
	Dhiab 15'			Stadium: Stade El Menzah; Attendance: 40,000; Referee: Mohamed Hansal (Algeria)

30 January 1988 1988 S.Olympics Q	Morocco	2–2	Tunisia	Rabat, Morocco
	Khairi 26'; Krimau 32'		Jabrane 19' (o.g.); Dhiab 90'	Stadium: Stade Moulay Abdellah; Attendance: 50,000; Referee: Badara Sène (Senegal)

2 February 1988 1988 Tournoi de France	Morocco	3–1	Austria	Toulouse, France
	Lachabi 54'; El Gharef 59', 65' (pen.)		Ogris 32'	Stadium: Stadium Municipal; Attendance: 15,000; Referee: Claude Bouillet (France)

5 February 1988 1988 Tournoi de France	France	2–1	Morocco	Monaco
	Lemriss 9' (o.g.); Stopyra 49'		Lemriss 34'	Stadium: Stade Louis II; Attendance: 10,000; Referee: Michel Vautrot (France)

3 March 1988 Friendly	Morocco	2–1	East Germany	Mohammedia, Morocco
	Hamraoui; Khairi		Ernst	Stadium: Stade El Bachir; Attendance: 5,000

13 March 1988 1988 AFCON GS	Morocco	1–1	Zaire	Casablanca, Morocco
	Merry 43' (pen.)		Lutonadio 88'	Stadium: Stade Mohamed V Attendance: 80,000; Referee: Gebreyesus Tesfaye (Ethiopia)

16 March 1988 1988 AFCON GS	Morocco	1–0	Algeria	Casablanca, Morocco
	El Haddaoui 52'			Stadium: Stade Mohamed V Attendance: 78,000; Referee: Idrissa Sarr (Mauritania)

19 March 1988 1988 AFCON GS	Morocco	0–0	Ivory Coast	Casablanca, Morocco
				Stadium: Stade Mohamed V Attendance: 80,000; Referee: Ally Hafidhi (Tanzania)

23 March 1988 1988 AFCON SF	Morocco	0–1	Cameroon	Casablanca, Morocco
			Makanaky 78'	Stadium: Stade Mohamed V Attendance: 45,000; Referee: Eganaden Cadressen (Mauritius)

26 March 1988 1988 AFCON Third place	Morocco	1–1 (a.e.t.) (3–4 p)	Algeria	Casablanca, Morocco
	Nader 67'		Belloumi 87'	Stadium: Stade Mohamed V Attendance: 10,000; Referee: Ally Hafidhi (Tanzania)
	Penalties
	El Gharef (penalty missed); Benabicha (penalty missed); Ouadani (penalty scored); El Maataoui (penalty scored); Timoumi (penalty scored); Nader (penalty missed)		(penalty scored) Yahi; (penalty missed) Djahmoune; (penalty scored) Merzekane; (penalty scored) Chaib; (penalty missed) Megharia; (penalty scored) Belgherbi

6 December 1988 Friendly	Morocco	0–0	Egypt	Casablanca, Morocco
				Stadium: Stade Mohamed V

15 December 1988 Friendly	Morocco	5–2	Gabon	Rabat, Morocco
	Fettah; Ouzouggate (pen.); Laghrissi		N'gouma (pen.); Louba	Stadium: Stade Moulay Abdellah

22 December 1988 Friendly	Morocco	1–0	Guinea	Rabat, Morocco
	Fadel			Stadium: Stade Moulay Abdellah

=== 1989 ===
8 January 1989 1990 WCQ	Morocco	1–0	Zambia	Rabat, Morocco
	Rhiati 39'			Stadium: Stade Moulay Abdellah; Attendance: 35,000; Referee: Bashir Salem (Libya)

22 January 1989 1990 WCQ	Tunisia	2–1	Morocco	Tunis, Tunisia
	Abdelli 37'; Dhiab 44'		Bouderbala 4'	Stadium: Stade El Menzah; Attendance: 45,000; Referee: Idrissa Sarr (Mauritania)

22 March 1989 Friendly	Algeria	1–1	Morocco	Algiers, Algeria
	Goal		Goal	Stadium: Stade 5 Juillet 1962

1 April 1989 Friendly	Senegal	2–1	Morocco	Dakar, Senegal
	Goal		Goal	Stadium: Stade de l'Amitié

9 April 1989 1990 AFCON Q	Mali	0–0	Morocco	Bamako, Mali
				Attendance: 35,000; Referee: Idrissa Sarr (Mauritania)

23 April 1989 1990 AFCON Q	Morocco	1–1	Mali	Marrakesh, Morocco
	Nader		Kouyaté	Stadium: Stade El Harti; Referee: Neji Jouini (Tunisia)

24 May 1989 Friendly	Morocco	1–0	Algeria	Casablanca, Morocco
	Goal			Stadium: Stade Mohamed V

11 June 1989 1990 WCQ	Zaire	0–0	Morocco	Kinshasa, Zaire
				Stadium: Stade du 20 Mai; Attendance: 50,000; Referee: Badara Sène (Senegal)

25 June 1989 1990 WCQ	Zambia	2–1	Morocco	Lusaka, Zambia
	Musonda 42'; Bwalya 87'		Timoumi 73'	Stadium: Independence Stadium; Attendance: 40,000; Referee: Bester Kalombo (Malawi)

13 August 1989 1990 WCQ	Morocco	0–0	Tunisia	Casablanca, Morocco
				Stadium: Stade Mohamed V Attendance: 35,111; Referee: Jean-Fidele Diramba (Gabon)

27 August 1989 1990 WCQ	Morocco	1–1	Zaire	Kenitra, Morocco
	Madih 58'		Makukula 47'	Stadium: Stade Municipal; Attendance: 1,839; Referee: Abderrahmane Bergui (Algeria)
