= 1972 African Cup of Nations qualification =

Football tournament

This page details the process of qualifying for the 1972 African Cup of Nations.

Sudan automatically qualify as holders and Cameroon automatically qualify as hosts.

== Qualifying tournament ==
=== First round ===
Team 1	Agg.	Team 2	1st leg	2nd leg
Tanzania	2–6	Zambia	1–1	1–5
Nigeria	1–2	Congo-Brazzaville	0–0	1–2
Gabon	1–3	Ivory Coast	1–2	0–1
Uganda	1–5	Congo-Kinshasa	1–4	0–1
Togo	2–1	Dahomey	2–1	0–0
Madagascar	3–5	Mauritius	2–1	1–4
Kenya	3–0	Ethiopia	2–0	1–0
Algeria	3–4	Morocco	3–1	0–3
Niger	1–4	Mali	0–1	1–3
Libya	1–3	United Arab Republic	0–1	1–2
Guinea	1–0	Senegal	1–0	0–0
Ghana	w/o	Upper Volta	—	—

17 October 1970

Tanzania	1–1	Zambia

National Stadium, Dar es Salaam
1 November 1970

Zambia	5–1	Tanzania
Chitalu; Chama; M'hango; Stephenson		?

Lusaka

Zambia won 6–2 on aggregate.

8 November 1970

Nigeria	0–0	Congo-Brazzaville

Liberty Stadium, Ibadan
22 November 1970

Congo-Brazzaville	2–1	Nigeria
Mayanda (pen.)		?

Stade Alphonse Massemba-Débat, Brazzaville

Congo-Brazzaville won 2–1 on aggregate.

8 November 1970

Gabon	1–2	Ivory Coast

Stade Omar Bongo, Libreville
22 November 1970

Ivory Coast	1–0	Gabon

Stade Félix Houphouët-Boigny, Abidjan

Ivory Coast won 3–1 on aggregate.

8 November 1970

Uganda	1–4	Congo-Kinshasa
		Kembo Uba Kembo

Nakivubo Stadium, Kampala
24 November 1970

Congo-Kinshasa	1–0	Uganda
Kembo Uba Kembo

Stade Tata Raphaël, Kinshasa

Congo-Kinshasa won 5–1 on aggregate.

8 November 1970

Togo	2–1	Dahomey

Lomé
22 November 1970

Dahomey	0–0	Togo

Porto Novo

Togo won 2–1 on aggregate.

15 November 1970

Madagascar	2–1	Mauritius

Antananarivo
29 November 1970

Mauritius	4–1	Madagascar
Desvaux

Stade George V, Curepipe

Mauritius won 5–3 on aggregate.

22 November 1970

Kenya	2–0	Ethiopia
Ouma; Nyawanga

Nairobi City Stadium, Nairobi
15 December 1970

Ethiopia	0–1	Kenya
		Niva 60' (pen.)

Addis Ababa Stadium, Addis Ababa

Kenya won 3–0 on aggregate.

10 December 1970

Algeria	3–1	Morocco
Kalem 46', 60', 80'		Bendayan 6'

20 August Stadium, Algiers
Attendance: 20,000
Referee: Mahmoud Mostafa Kamel (United Arab Republic)
27 December 1970

Morocco	3–0	Algeria
Bamous 30'; Choukri 38'; Benkhrif 90+4'

Stade d'Honneur, Casablanca
Attendance: 20,000
Referee: Moustapha N'Gom (Senegal)

Morocco won 4–3 on aggregate.

12 December 1970

Niger	0–1	Mali
		Kanté

Niamey
27 December 1970

Mali	3–1	Niger
Cissé; Diallo		Goal

Bamako

Mali won 4–1 on aggregate.

27 December 1970

Libya	0–1	United Arab Republic
		Helail

Tripoli
Referee: ... Benkhedir (Algeria)
3 January 1971

United Arab Republic	2–1	Libya
Helail		Dames Al-Sagheer

Cairo
Referee: Babiker isa (Sudan)

Egypt won 3–1 on aggregate.

18 August 1971

Guinea	1–0	Senegal

Stade du 28 Septembre, Conakry
1 September 1971

Senegal	0–0	Guinea

Stade Demba Diop, Dakar

Guinea won 1–0 on aggregate.

Ghana	Cancelled	Upper Volta
		Withdrew

Ghana progress, Upper Volta withdrew.

=== Second round ===
Team 1	Agg.	Team 2	1st leg	2nd leg
Morocco	5–3	United Arab Republic	3–0	2–3
Zambia	2–4	Zaire	2–1	0–3
Togo	1–0	Ghana	0–0	1–0
Guinea	1–3	Mali	0–0	1–3
Ivory Coast	3–4	Congo-Brazzaville	3–2	0–2
Kenya	2–1	Mauritius	2–1	0–0

14 March 1971

Morocco	3–0	United Arab Republic
El Filali; Choukri; Bamous

Stade d'Honneur, Casablanca
Attendance: 35,000
16 April 1971

United Arab Republic	3–2	Morocco
El-Shazly 40', 43'; Basry 52'		Bamous 50'; Aherdane 74'

Cairo International Stadium, Cairo

Morocco won 5–3 on aggregate.

13 October 1971

Zambia	2–1	Zaire
Stephenson 15'; M'hango 45+1'		Etepé 16'

Dag Hammarskjöld Stadium, Ndola
27 October 1971

Zaire	3–0	Zambia
Kembo Uba Kembo

Stade Tata Raphaël, Kinshasa

Zaire won 4–2 on aggregate.

13 June 1971

Togo	0–0	Ghana

Lomé
20 June 1971

Ghana	0–1	Togo

Accra Sports Stadium, Accra

Togo won 1–0 on aggregate.

13 June 1971

Guinea	0–0	Mali

Stade du 28 Septembre, Conakry
27 June 1971

Mali	3–1	Guinea
Traoré 4'; S. Keïta 6'; Sangaré 66' (pen.)		Thiam 48'

Bamako

Mali won 3–1 on aggregate.

4 July 1971

Ivory Coast	3–2	Congo-Brazzaville
Goal		Mayanda

Stade Félix Houphouët-Boigny, Abidjan
18 July 1971

Congo-Brazzaville	2–0	Ivory Coast
M'Pelé 30'; Moukila 51'

Stade Alphonse Massemba-Débat, Brazzaville

Congo-Brazzaville won 4–3 on aggregate.

4 July 1971

Kenya	2–1	Mauritius
Niva 37' (pen.); Farah 88'		Goal

Nairobi City Stadium, Nairobi
18 July 1971

Mauritius	0–0	Kenya

Port Louis

Kenya won 2–1 on aggregate.

== Qualified teams ==
The 8 qualified teams are:

- Cameroon (hosts)
- Congo-Brazzaville
- Kenya
- Mali
- Morocco
- Togo
- Sudan (holders)
- Zaire
