= Football at the 1976 Summer Olympics – Men's African Qualifiers =

1976 Summer Olympics – Men's Football African Qualifiers
- Dates: 11 May 1975 – 4 April 1976

== First round ==
Team 1	Agg.	Team 2	1st leg	2nd leg
Algeria	2–3	Tunisia	1–1	1–2
Egypt	1–2	Sudan	1–1	0–1
Ethiopia	0–3	Tanzania	0–0	0–3
Gambia	0–7	Guinea	0–1	0–6
Ghana	10–1	Liberia	6–0	4–1
Mauritania	0–7	Mali	0–1	0–6
Malawi	w/o	Madagascar	—	—
Morocco	3–1	Libya	2–1	1–0
Nigeria	w/o	Cameroon	—	—
Togo	1–2	Senegal	1–1	0–1
Zaire	6–2	Upper Volta	4–1	2–1
Zambia	9–0	Mauritius	5–0	4–0

11 May 1975

Algeria	1–1	Tunisia
Madani 83'		Habita 38'

5 July Stadium, Algiers
1 June 1975

Tunisia	2–1	Algeria
Agrebi 56'; Liman 74'		Belkedrouci 80'

Stade El Menzah, Tunis
Attendance: 30 000
Referee: Alberto Michelotti (Italy)

2 May 1975

Egypt	1–1	Sudan
Shehata 29'		Goal

Nasser Stadium, Cairo
30 May 1975

Sudan	1–0	Egypt
Gagarin

Khartoum Stadium, Khartoum

18 May 1975

Ethiopia	0–0	Tanzania

Addis Ababa Stadium, Addis Ababa
31 May 1975

Tanzania	3–0	Ethiopia
Nguluko; Sembuli; Hassan

Uhuru Stadium, Dar es Salaam

27 April 1975

Gambia	0–1	Guinea
		Goal

Independence Stadium, Banjul
1 June 1975

Guinea	6–0	Gambia

Stade du 28 Septembre, Conakry

6 April 1975

Ghana	6–0	Liberia
Owusu

Accra Sports Stadium, Accra
20 April 1975

Liberia	1–4	Ghana
Goal		Owusu

Monrovia

18 May 1975

Mauritania	0–1	Mali
		Elba 56'

Nouakchott
1 June 1975

Mali	6–0	Mauritania

Bamako

Malawi	Cancelled	Madagascar
		Withdrew

23 February 1975

Morocco	2–1	Libya
Faras 3'; Acila 77'		Al-Bahloul

Stade d'Honneur, Casablanca
14 March 1975

Libya	0–1	Morocco
		Goal

March 28 Stadium, Benghazi

Nigeria	Cancelled	Cameroon
		Withdrew

18 April 1975

Togo	1–1	Senegal

Stade Omnisports de Lomé, Lomé
1 June 1975

Senegal	1–0	Togo

Stade Demba Diop, Dakar

6 April 1975

Zaire	4–1	Upper Volta

Stade Tata Raphaël, Kinshasa
27 April 1975

Upper Volta	1–2	Zaire

Stade Municipal de Ouagadougou, Ouagadougou

4 May 1975

Zambia	5–0	Mauritius
Chola; Simulambo; Chanda

Dag Hammarskjöld Stadium, Ndola
18 May 1975

Mauritius	0–4	Zambia
		Chola

Stade George V, Curepipe

== Second round ==
Team 1	Agg.	Team 2	1st leg	2nd leg
Guinea	3–6	Ghana	1–0	2–6
Malawi	2–5	Zambia	1–1	1–4
Nigeria	w/o	Mali	—	—
Senegal	3–3 (5–4 p)	Zaire	3–1	0–2
Tanzania	1–2	Sudan	1–0	0–2
Tunisia	0–2	Morocco	0–1	0–1

30 November 1975

Guinea	1–0	Ghana
Souleymane

Stade du 28 Septembre, Conakry
14 December 1975

Ghana	6–2	Guinea
Owusu		Souleymane ?

Accra Sports Stadium, Accra

31 August 1975

Malawi	1–1	Zambia
Phiri		Goal

Zomba Stadium, Zomba
12 October 1975

Zambia	4–1	Malawi
Chola		Osman (pen.)

Dag Hammarskjöld Stadium, Ndola

Nigeria	Cancelled	Mali
		Withdrew

30 November 1975

Senegal	3–1	Zaire
Goal		Goal

Stade Demba Diop, Dakar
14 December 1975

Zaire	2–0	Senegal
Goal
Penalties
	4–5

Stade Tata Raphaël, Kinshasa

22 November 1975

Tanzania	1–0	Sudan
Goal

Uhuru Stadium, Dar es Salaam
5 December 1975

Sudan	2–0	Tanzania

Khartoum Stadium, Khartoum

30 November 1975

Tunisia	0–1	Morocco
		Zahraoui 8'

Stade El Menzah, Tunis
14 December 1975

Morocco	1–0	Tunisia
Faras 15'

Stade d'Honneur, Casablanca

== Third round ==
3 groups of 2 teams each. Winners qualify for the Final Tournament.

Team 1	Agg.	Team 2	1st leg	2nd leg
Nigeria	3–2	Morocco	3–1	0–1
Senegal	1–2	Ghana	0–0	1–2
Zambia	2–2 (5–4 p)	Sudan	2–2	0–0

3 April 1976

Nigeria	3–1	Morocco
Usiyan 14', 48'; Emeteole 80'		Choukri

Surulere Stadium, Lagos
18 April 1976

Morocco	1–0	Nigeria
Acila 53'

Stade de Marchan, Tangier

Nigeria won 3–2 and qualified for the 1976 Summer Olympics football tournament.

14 March 1976

Senegal	0–0	Ghana

Stade Demba Diop, Dakar
28 March 1976

Ghana	2–1	Senegal

Accra Sports Stadium, Accra

Ghana won 2–1 and qualified for the 1976 Summer Olympics football tournament.

28 March 1976

Zambia	1–1	Sudan
Chanda		Ali Gagarin 20'

Dag Hammarskjöld Stadium, Ndola
4 April 1976

Sudan	0–0	Zambia
Penalties
	4–5

Khartoum Stadium, Khartoum

Zambia won 5–4 on penalties after 1–1 on aggregates and qualified for the 1976 Summer Olympics football tournament.

== Boycott ==
The three African participants boycotted the day before the start of the Games to protest the participation of New Zealand, whose rugby team planned a summer tour of South Africa in spite of the Soweto uprising.

Due to logistical issues and the large number of other African nations boycotting the Games, these teams could not be replaced, meaning the final tournament was played three teams short.
