= 1974 Kuneitra Cup =

International football tournament held in Damascus, Syria

Tournament details
- Host country: Syria
- City: Damascus
- Dates: 26 September – 9 October 1974
- Teams: 11 (from 2 confederations)
- Venue(s): 1 (in 1 host city)

Final positions
- Champions: Morocco
- Runners-up: Syria
- Third place: Tunisia
- Fourth place: Sudan

Tournament statistics
- Matches played: 29
- Goals scored: 108 (3.72 per match)
- Top scorer(s): (Egypt) Ali Khalil (EGY) (Morocco) Ahmed Faras (Palestine) Abdel Aziz (6 goals each)

The 1974 Kuneitra Cup (Arabic: كأس القنيطرة 1974) was an international football tournament held in Damascus, Syria, from 26 September to 9 October 1974. Morocco won the tournament, beating Syria in the final.

== Format ==
The 11 teams were distributed in two groups: Group A was composed of Syria, Sudan, Libya, Palestine, and North Yemen; Group B of Morocco, Tunisia, Egypt B, NA Hussein Dey, Lebanon, Jordan. The top two teams of each group faced each other in the semi-finals: the winners progressed to the final, whereas the losers played the third-place match.

== Group stage ==
=== Group A ===
Pos	Team	Pld	W	D	L	GF	GA	GD	Pts	Qualification
1	Syria	4	4	0	0	13	2	+11	8	Semi-finals
2	Sudan	4	3	0	1	12	4	+8	6	Semi-finals
3	Libya	4	1	1	2	11	6	+5	3	
4	Palestine	4	1	1	2	8	6	+2	3	
5	North Yemen	4	0	0	4	2	28	−26	0	

Source: RSSSF
Rules for classification: 1) Points; 2) Goal average.
26 September 1974

Syria	2–0	Palestine
Tughli; Esfahani

Abbasiyyin Stadium, Damascus

28 September 1974

Syria	2–1	Libya
Nano; Sorour		Al-Ghazali

Abbasiyyin Stadium, Damascus
28 September 1974

Sudan	6–0	North Yemen
Gagarin; Sharafeldin; Santo

Abbasiyyin Stadium, Damascus

30 September 1974

Sudan	3–1	Palestine
Al-Kori; Baye; Gagarin		Abdel Aziz

Abbasiyyin Stadium, Damascus
30 September 1974

Libya	9–1	North Yemen
Al-Ghazali; Muhammad; Al-Aswad; Circassi; Al-Bohemi; Al-Jahmani		Al-Jaradi

Abbasiyyin Stadium, Damascus

2 October 1974

Syria	2–0	Sudan
Sorour; Goutouk

Abbasiyyin Stadium, Damascus
2 October 1974

Libya	0–0	Palestine

Abbasiyyin Stadium, Damascus

4 October 1974

Syria	6–0	North Yemen
Goutouq; Hatmah; Sorour; Berjakli; Mahlami

Abbasiyyin Stadium, Damascus
4 October 1974

Sudan	3–1	Libya
Sharafeldin; Santo; Kamal		Al-Aswad

Abbasiyyin Stadium, Damascus

6 October 1974

Palestine	7–1	North Yemen
Abdel Aziz; Naimi; Naji		Nashta

Abbasiyyin Stadium, Damascus

=== Group B ===
Pos	Team	Pld	W	D	L	GF	GA	GD	Pts	Qualification
1	Morocco	5	5	0	0	13	4	+9	10	Semi-finals
2	Tunisia	5	3	0	2	10	5	+5	6	Semi-finals
3	Egypt B	5	3	0	2	12	7	+5	6	
4	(Algeria) NA Hussein Dey	5	2	0	3	11	6	+5	4	
5	Lebanon	5	1	1	3	3	10	−7	3	
6	Jordan	5	0	1	4	1	18	−17	1	

Source: RSSSF
Rules for classification: 1) Points; 2) Goal average.
27 September 1974

Tunisia	2–0	Egypt B
Ratima; Bou Ghania

Abbasiyyin Stadium, Damascus
27 September 1974

Morocco	2–1	Jordan
Ismail (o.g.); Faras		Al-Tali

Abbasiyyin Stadium, Damascus
27 September 1974

NA Hussein Dey (Algeria)	4–1	Lebanon
Lalmas; Khalem		El Sahili

Abbasiyyin Stadium, Damascus

29 September 1974

Lebanon	2–1	Tunisia
Dougan; El Sahili		Kamoun

Abbasiyyin Stadium, Damascus
29 September 1974

Morocco	4–2	Egypt B
Dish; El Safawi; Makrouh		Rushdie; Mostafa

Abbasiyyin Stadium, Damascus
29 September 1974

NA Hussein Dey (Algeria)	6–0	Jordan
Chenen; Boudjenoun; Amidan; Sahli

Abbasiyyin Stadium, Damascus

1 October 1974

Egypt B	3–1	(Algeria) NA Hussein Dey
Khalil; Hamza		Khalem

Abbasiyyin Stadium, Damascus
1 October 1974

Morocco	3–1	Tunisia
Faras; Safawi		Habita

Abbasiyyin Stadium, Damascus
1 October 1974

Jordan	0–0	Lebanon

Abbasiyyin Stadium, Damascus

3 October 1974

Morocco	3–0	Lebanon
Al-Safawi; Ahmed; Ihardane

Abbasiyyin Stadium, Damascus
3 October 1974

Tunisia	1–0	(Algeria) NA Hussein Dey
Kabouti

Abbasiyyin Stadium, Damascus
3 October 1974

Egypt B	5–0	Jordan
Khalil; Yaqoub; Bayoumi

Abbasiyyin Stadium, Damascus

5 October 1974

Morocco	1–0	(Algeria) NA Hussein Dey
Faras

Abbasiyyin Stadium, Damascus
5 October 1974

Tunisia	5–0	Jordan
Boughanieh; Habita; Al-Khwaini

Abbasiyyin Stadium, Damascus
5 October 1974

Egypt B	2–0	Lebanon
Khalil; Hassan

Abbasiyyin Stadium, Damascus

== Knockout stage ==
=== Bracket ===
Semi-finals
7 October – Abbasiyyin Stadium
Syria (a.e.t.)	3
Tunisia	1
7 October – Abbasiyyin Stadium
Morocco	2
Sudan	0

Final
9 October – Abbasiyyin Stadium
Syria	1 (3)
Morocco (p)	1 (4)
Third place play-off
9 October – Abbasiyyin Stadium
Tunisia	3
Sudan	1

=== Semi-finals ===
7 October 1974

Syria	3–1 (a.e.t.)	Tunisia
Lotfi; Tughli; Said		Boughanieh

Abbasiyyin Stadium, Damascus
7 October 1974

Morocco	2–0	Sudan
Dish; Ahmed		Boughanieh

Abbasiyyin Stadium, Damascus

=== Third place play-off ===
9 October 1974

Tunisia	3–1	Sudan
Kretet; Kamoun		Abdallah

Abbasiyyin Stadium, Damascus

=== Final ===
9 October 1974

Syria	1–1 (a.e.t.)	Morocco
Goutouq		Faras
Penalties
Tatish (penalty scored); Mahalmi (penalty scored); Al-Nimr (penalty scored)	3–4	(penalty scored) Najah; (penalty scored) Al-Safawi; (penalty scored) Faras; (penalty scored) Dish

Abbasiyyin Stadium, Damascus

== Scorers ==
There were 108 goals scored in 29 matches, for an average of 3.72 goals per match.

6 goals

- (Egypt) Ali Khalil (EGY)
- (Morocco) Ahmed Faras
- (Palestine) Abdel Aziz

4 goals

- (Libya) Saeed Al-Ghazali (LBY)
- (Tunisia) Zoubir Boughanieh
- (Sudan) Ali Gagarin
- (Syria) Azam Goutouk (SYR)

3 goals

- (Algeria) Mokhtar Khalem
- (Morocco) Idris Dish
- (Morocco) Ahmed El Safawi
- (Sudan) Sharafeldin Ahmed Musa
- (Syria) Radwan Sorour (SYR)
- (Tunisia) Muhyiddin Habita

2 goals

- (Algeria) Ammar Boudjenoun
- (Algeria) Hacène Lalmas
- (Algeria) Lamri Chenen
- (Lebanon) Atef El Sahili
- (Libya) Ali Al-Aswad (LBY)
- (Libya) Ali Muhammad (LBY)
- (Sudan) Alfadel Santo
- (Syria) Mahmoud Tughli (SYR)
- (Tunisia) Hamed Kamoun
- (Tunisia) Abdel Nasser Kretet

1 goal

- (Algeria) Ali Amidan
- (Algeria) Salem Sahli
- (Egypt) Ahmed Bayoumi (EGY)
- (Egypt) Mohamed Said Hamza (EGY)
- (Egypt) Mahmoud Hassan (EGY)
- (Egypt) Yassin Mostafa (EGY)
- (Egypt) Mahmoud Rushdie (EGY)
- (Egypt) Ezz El Din Yaqoub (EGY)
- (Jordan) Nabil Al-Tali
- (Lebanon) Rashid Dougan
- (Libya) Abdel-Qader Al-Bohemi (LBY)
- (Libya) Mahmoud Al-Jahmani (LBY)
- (Libya) Abdul-Bari Circassi (LBY)
- (Morocco) Larbi Ihardane
- (Morocco) Ahmed Makrouh
- (Yemen Arab Republic) Nasr Al-Jaradi
- (Palestine) Samir Naimi
- (Palestine) Ahmed Naji
- (Palestine) Hamid Nashta
- (Sudan) Abdel Aziz Abdallah
- (Sudan) Abdel Aziz Baye
- (Sudan) Khedr Al-Kori
- (Sudan) Kamal Abdelwahab
- (Syria) Haitham Berjakli (SYR)
- (Syria) Riad Esfahani (SYR)
- (Syria) Suhail Lotfi (SYR)
- (Syria) Ibrahim Mahlami (SYR)
- (Syria) Ayman Matmah (SYR)
- (Syria) Nabil Nano (SYR)
- (Syria) Samir Said (SYR)
- (Tunisia) Abdel Majid Kabouti
- (Tunisia) Moncef Al-Khwaini
- (Tunisia) Ali Ratima

1 own goal

- (Jordan) Badr Ismail (against Morocco)

== See also ==
- Quneitra
