= 1976 African Cup of Nations qualification =

Football tournament

This page details the information on the matches and their outcomes for the 1976 African Cup of Nations.

== Qualifying tournament ==
=== Preliminary round ===
Team 1	Agg.	Team 2	1st leg	2nd leg
Somalia	1–2	Burundi	0–2	1–0
Tunisia	1–1 (3–2 p)	Libya	1–0	0–1
Togo	3–0	Liberia	1–0	2–0
Morocco	6–0	Gambia	3–0	3–0
Mali	w/o	Lesotho	—	—
Niger	w/o	Dahomey	—	—

10 August 1974

Somalia	0–2	Burundi

Mogadishu Stadium, Mogadishu
24 August 1974

Burundi	0–1	Somalia

Bujumbura

Burundi won 2–1 on aggregate.

10 November 1974

Tunisia	1–0	Libya
Khouini 13'

Stade El Menzah, Tunis
Referee: Awadh Al-Saeedi (Egypt)
22 November 1974

Libya	1–0	Tunisia
Al-Fazani
Penalties
	2–3

Tripoli

Tunisia won 3–2 on penalties after 1–1 on aggregate.

10 November 1974

Togo	1–0	Liberia

Stade Général Eyadema, Lomé
22 November 1974

Liberia	0–2	Togo

Antoinette Tubman Stadium, Monrovia

Togo won 3–0 on aggregate.

24 November 1974

Morocco	3–0	Gambia
Guezzar ? ?

Stade d'Honneur, Casablanca
7 December 1974

Gambia	0–3	Morocco
		Guezzar ? ?

Box Bar Stadium, Banjul

Morocco won 6–0 on aggregate.

Mali	Cancelled	Lesotho
		Withdrew

Mali advanced after Lesotho withdrew.

Niger	Cancelled	Dahomey
		Withdrew

Niger advanced after Dahomey withdrew.

=== First round ===
Team 1	Agg.	Team 2	1st leg	2nd leg
Morocco	5–2	Senegal	4–0	1–2
Tunisia	3–2	Algeria	1–1	2–1
Uganda	5–1	Mauritius	4–0	1–1
Niger	2–7	Guinea	2–4	0–3
Sudan	3–0	Kenya	1–0	2–0
Burundi	0–5	Egypt	0–3	0–2
Ghana	5–3	Mali	4–0	1–3
Congo	2–2 (a)	Ivory Coast	1–0	1–2
Malawi	4–9	Zambia	1–6	3–3
Cameroon	3–4	Togo	3–0	0–4
Nigeria	w/o	Central African Republic	—	—
Tanzania	w/o	Madagascar	—	—

22 March 1975

Morocco	4–0	Senegal
Faras 30'; Acila; Guezzar; Najah

Stade Hassan II, Fez
13 April 1975

Senegal	2–1	Morocco
Sagna 2', 42'		Faras 86'

Kaolack

Morocco won 5–2 on aggregate.

23 March 1975

Tunisia	1–1	Algeria
Habita 86'		Gamouh 64'

Stade El Menzah, Tunis
6 April 1975

Algeria	1–2	Tunisia
Ighil 59'		Khouini 44', 89'

19 June Stadium, Oran

Tunisia won 3–2 on aggregate.

23 March 1975

Uganda	4–0	Mauritius

Nakivubo Stadium, Kampala
6 April 1975

Mauritius	1–1	Uganda

Port Louis

Uganda won 5–1 on aggregate.

23 March 1975

Niger	2–4	Guinea

Niamey
6 April 1975

Guinea	3–0	Niger

Stade du 28 Septembre, Conakry

Guinea won 7–2 on aggregate.

23 March 1975

Sudan	1–0	Kenya
Gagarin 26'

Khartoum Stadium, Khartoum
6 April 1975

Kenya	0–2	Sudan
		Gagarin 42', 90'

Nairobi City Stadium, Nairobi

Sudan won 3–0 on aggregate.

24 March 1975

Burundi	0–3	Egypt
		A. Khalil 27'; Shehata 31'; O. Khalil 82'

Prince Louis Rwagasore Stadium, Bujumbura
19 April 1975

Egypt	2–0	Burundi
El Khatib 16', 55'

Nasser Stadium, Cairo

Egypt won 5–0 on aggregate.

30 March 1975

Ghana	4–0	Mali
Owusu

Accra Sports Stadium, Accra
13 April 1975

Mali	3–1	Ghana
Goal		Owusu

Bamako

Ghana won 5–3 on aggregate.

30 March 1975

Congo	1–0	Ivory Coast
Moukila

Stade Alphonse Massemba-Débat, Brazzaville
13 April 1975

Ivory Coast	2–1	Congo
Goal		Moukila

Stade Félix Houphouët-Boigny, Abidjan

Congo advanced by away goals rule after 2–2 on aggregate.

30 March 1975

Malawi	1–6	Zambia
Phiri		Chanda; Sinyangwe; Mapulanga; Kapita

Kamuzu Stadium, Blantyre
14 April 1975

Zambia	3–3	Malawi
Chola		Phiri; Chikafa

Lusaka

Zambia won 9–4 on aggregate.

13 April 1975

Cameroon	3–0	Togo
Tokoto; Eboué

Stade de la Réunification, Douala
20 April 1975

Togo	4–0	Cameroon

Lomé

Togo won 4–3 on aggregate.

Nigeria	Cancelled	Central African Republic
		Withdrew

Nigeria advanced after Central African Republic withdrew.

Tanzania	Cancelled	Madagascar
		Withdrew

Tanzania advanced after Madagascar withdrew.

=== Second round ===
Team 1	Agg.	Team 2	1st leg	2nd leg
Ghana	2–2 (5–6 p)	Morocco	2–0	0–2
Togo	2–4	Guinea	2–2	0–2
Tanzania	3–6	Egypt	1–1	2–5
Tunisia	4–4 (a)	Sudan	3–2	1–2
Zambia	2–4	Uganda	2–1	0–3
Congo	1–3	Nigeria	0–1	1–2

29 June 1975

Ghana	2–0	Morocco
Owusu 59' (pen.); Sam 90'

Accra
13 July 1975

Morocco	2–0	Ghana
Chebbak; Acila 89' (pen.)
Penalties
	6–5

Stade d'Honneur, Casablanca

Morocco won 6–5 on penalty shootout after 2–2 on aggregate.

3 July 1975

Togo	2–2	Guinea

Stade Général Eyadema, Lomé
17 July 1975

Guinea	2–0	Togo
N'Jo Lea

Stade du 28 Septembre, Conakry

Guinea won 4–2 on aggregate.

5 July 1975

Tanzania	1–1	Egypt
Goal		Nour

National Stadium, Dar es Salaam
1 August 1975

Egypt	5–2	Tanzania
Gaafar 33'; O. Khalil 40', 74'; Nour 71', 72'		Goal

Cairo

Egypt won 6–3 on aggregate.

6 July 1975

Tunisia	3–2	Sudan
Ben Aziza 2'; Lahzami 5', 27'		Gagarin 34'; El-Kori 50'

Stade El Menzah, Tunis
15 August 1975

Sudan	2–1	Tunisia
Abdel Wahab 9'; Gagarin 75'		Ben Aziza 60'

Khartoum Stadium, Khartoum

Sudan won by away goals rule after 4–4 on aggregate.

12 July 1975

Zambia	2–1	Uganda
Chanda		Goal

Lusaka
15 August 1975

Uganda	3–0	Zambia
Omondi; Ouma

Nakivubo Stadium, Kampala

Uganda won 4–2 on aggregate.

13 July 1975

Congo	0–1	Nigeria

Stade Alphonse Massemba-Débat, Brazzaville
27 July 1975

Nigeria	2–1	Congo

Surulere Stadium, Lagos

Nigeria won 3–1 on aggregate.

== Qualified teams ==
The 8 qualified teams are:

- Egypt
- Ethiopia (hosts)
- Guinea
- Morocco
- Nigeria
- Sudan
- Uganda
- Zaire (holders)
