= Football at the 1984 Summer Olympics – Men's African Qualifiers =

1984 Summer Olympics – Men's Football African Qualifiers
- Dates: 3 March 1983 – 26 February 1984

This page provides the summaries of the matches of the qualifying rounds for the Football at the 1984 Summer Olympics to be held in Los Angeles. In the end three countries qualified.

== Preliminary round ==
| Team 1 | Agg. | Team 2 | 1st leg | 2nd leg |
|---|---|---|---|---|
| Mauritania | 2–6 | Gambia | 1–3 | 1–3 |
| Mozambique | 3–0 | Lesotho | 3–0 | 0–0 |
| Angola | w/o | Niger | — | — |
| Benin | w/o | Sierra Leone | — | — |
| Mauritius | w/o | Madagascar | — | — |
| Uganda | w/o | Congo | — | — |

3 March 1983

| Mauritania | 1–3 | Gambia |

Stade Olympique, Nouakchott
20 March 1983

| Gambia | 3–1 | Mauritania |

Box Bar Stadium, Banjul

6 March 1983

| Mozambique | 3–0 | Lesotho |

Estádio da Machava, Maputo
20 March 1983

| Lesotho | 0–0 | Mozambique |

Setsoto Stadium, Maseru

== First round ==
| Team 1 | Agg. | Team 2 | 1st leg | 2nd leg |
|---|---|---|---|---|
| Angola | 3–4 | Cameroon | 1–1 | 2–3 |
| Gambia | 0–3 | Ghana | 0–2 | 0–1 |
| Guinea | 0–3 | Morocco | 0–0 | 0–3 |
| Kenya | 1–2 | Libya | 1–0 | 0–2 |
| Mozambique | 0–3 | Zimbabwe | 0–1 | 0–2 |
| Nigeria | 3–2 | Togo | 2–1 | 1–1 |
| Senegal | 4–0 | Benin | 2–0 | 2–0 |
| Sudan | 1–2 | Egypt | 0–0 | 1–2 |
| Tunisia | 4–1 | Gabon | 3–0 | 1–1 |
| Uganda | 4–4 (a) | Algeria | 4–1 | 0–3 |
| Ethiopia | w/o | Tanzania | — | — |
| Zambia | w/o | Mauritius | — | — |

10 July 1983

| Angola | 1–1 | Cameroon |
|---|---|---|
| Afonso | | Aoudou |

Estádio da Cidadela, Luanda
24 July 1983

| Cameroon | 3–2 | Angola |
|---|---|---|
| | | Sarmento; Afonso |

Ahmadou Ahidjo Stadium, Yaounde

26 June 1983

| Gambia | 0–2 | Ghana |

Box Bar Stadium, Banjul
10 July 1983

| Ghana | 1–0 | Gambia |

Accra Sports Stadium, Accra

15 May 1983

| Guinea | 0–0 | Morocco |

Stade du 28 Septembre, Conakry
Attendance: 25,000
Referee: ... Iyoubi (Cameroon)
29 May 1983

| Morocco | 3–0 | Guinea |
|---|---|---|
| Krimau 5' |

Stade Mohammed V, Casablanca

8 May 1983

| Kenya | 1–0 | Libya |
|---|---|---|
| Jacaranda 70' |

Nairobi City Stadium, Nairobi
22 May 1983

| Libya | 2–0 | Kenya |

11 June Stadium, Tripoli

29 May 1983

| Mozambique | 0–1 | Zimbabwe |

Estádio da Machava, Maputo
12 June 1983

| Zimbabwe | 2–0 | Mozambique |

Rufaro Stadium, Harare

9 July 1983

| Nigeria | 2–1 | Togo |
|---|---|---|
| Adeshina | | Goal |

Liberty Stadium, Ibadan
24 July 1983

| Togo | 1–1 | Nigeria |
|---|---|---|
| Goal | | Adeshina |

Stade Municipal, Lomé

29 May 1983

| Senegal | 2–0 | Benin |

Stade Demba Diop, Dakar
12 June 1983

| Benin | 0–2 | Senegal |

Stade de l'Amitié, Cotonou

4 June 1983

| Sudan | 0–0 | Egypt |

Khartoum Stadium, Khartoum
29 July 1983

| Egypt | 2–1 | Sudan |
|---|---|---|
| Al Khatib; Suleiman 55' | | Alnager 62' |

Osman Ahmed Osman Stadium, Cairo

17 April 1983

| Tunisia | 3–0 | Gabon |
|---|---|---|
| Chebbi 44'; Dhiab 80'; Bayari 89' |

Stade El Menzah, Tunis
1 May 1983

| Gabon | 1–1 | Tunisia |
|---|---|---|
| Mboumba 79' | | Hergal 38' |

Stade Omar Bongo, Libreville

28 May 1983

| Uganda | 4–1 | Algeria |
|---|---|---|
| Kateregga 4'; Omondi 53', 89'; Sekatawa 88' | | Yahi 82' |

Nakivubo Stadium, Kampala
Attendance: 30,000
Referee: Mustapha Issa Badaoui (Sudan)
10 June 1983

| Algeria | 3–0 | Uganda |
|---|---|---|
| Madjer 49' (pen.); Bensaoula 64'; Bencheikh 77' |

5 July stadium, Algiers
Attendance: 34,000
Referee: Walid Ben Hamida (Tunisia)

Algeria on away goals rule

== Second round ==
| Team 1 | Agg. | Team 2 | 1st leg | 2nd leg |
|---|---|---|---|---|
| Libya | 2–3 | Algeria | 2–1 | 0–2 |
| Morocco | 2–1 | Senegal | 1–0 | 1–1 |
| Nigeria | 2–1 | Ghana | 0–0 | 2–1 |
| Zambia | 1–2 | Egypt | 1–0 | 0–2 |
| Zimbabwe | 3–3 (a) | Ethiopia | 3–2 | 0–1 |
| Cameroon | w/o | Tunisia | — | — |

14 October 1983

| Libya | 2–1 | Algeria |
|---|---|---|
| Al-Meliani 53'; Al-Marghani 71' (pen.) | | Tlemçani 83' |

11 June Stadium Tripoli
Attendance: 30 000
Referee: ... Kakalo (Congo)
28 October 1983

| Algeria | 2–0 | Libya |
|---|---|---|
| Belloumi 16'; Merzekane 71' |

5 July stadium, Algiers
Attendance: 48 850
Referee: Karim Camara (Guinea)

25 September 1983

| Morocco | 1–0 | Senegal |
|---|---|---|
| El Haddaoui (pen.) |

Stade Mohammed V, Casablanca
9 October 1983

| Senegal | 1–1 | Morocco |
|---|---|---|
| Goal | | Souadi (pen.) |

Stade Demba Diop, Dakar

15 October 1983

| Nigeria | 0–0 | Ghana |

Ahmadu Bello Stadium, Kaduna
30 October 1983

| Ghana | 1–2 | Nigeria |
|---|---|---|
| Goal | | Ehilegu; Omughele |

Accra Sports Stadium, Accra

9 October 1983

| Zambia | 1–0 | Egypt |

Independence Stadium, Lusaka
29 October 1983

| Egypt | 2–0 | Zambia |
|---|---|---|
| El Khatib 1'; Abdelghani 82' |

Cairo International Stadium, Cairo

2 October 1983

| Zimbabwe | 3–2 | Ethiopia |

Rufaro Stadium, Harare
16 October 1983

| Ethiopia | 1–0 | Zimbabwe |

Addis Ababa Stadium, Addis Ababa

Ethiopia on away goals rule

== Third round ==
| Team 1 | Agg. | Team 2 | 1st leg | 2nd leg |
|---|---|---|---|---|
| Algeria | 1–2 | Egypt | 1–1 | 0–1 |
| Cameroon | 5–1 | Ethiopia | 4–0 | 1–1 |
| Nigeria | 0–0 (3–4 p) | Morocco | 0–0 | 0–0 |

6 January 1984

| Algeria | 1–1 | Egypt |
|---|---|---|
| Bensaoula 1' | | Youssef 39' |

5 July stadium, Algiers
Attendance: 38 250
Referee: Ali Bin Nasser (Tunisia)
17 February 1984

| Egypt | 1–0 | Algeria |
|---|---|---|
| Nabiel 57' |

Cairo International Stadium, Cairo
Attendance: 120,000
Referee: Cheikh Djibril M'Baye (Senegal)

22 January 1984

| Cameroon | 4–0 | Ethiopia |

Ahmadou Ahidjo Stadium, Yaoundé
11 February 1984

| Ethiopia | 1–1 | Cameroon |
|---|---|---|
| Goal | | Abega |

Addis Ababa Stadium, Addis Ababa

11 February 1984

| Nigeria | 0–0 | Morocco |

Surulere Stadium, Lagos
26 February 1984

| Morocco | 0–0 | Nigeria |
Penalties
| | 4–3 |

Stade Mohammed V, Casablanca

Cameroon, Egypt and Morocco qualified.
