= Salah Assad =

Algerian footballer (born 1958)

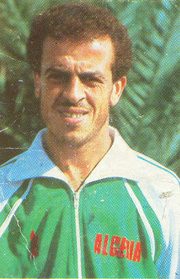
- Assad in 1986

Personal information
- Date of birth: 13 March 1958 (age 68)
- Place of birth: Larbaâ Nath Irathen, Algeria
- Height: 1.84 m (6 ft 0 in)
- Position: Forward

Youth career
- 1972–1974: JSM Chéraga
- 1974–1975: RC Kouba

Senior career*
| Years | Team | Apps | (Gls) |
| 1975–1982 | RC Kouba / RS Kouba | | |
| 1982–1983 | Mulhouse | 26 | (13) |
| 1983–1984 | → Paris Saint-Germain (loan) | 11 | (1) |
| 1984–1986 | Mulhouse | 55 | (15) |
| 1986–1989 | RS Kouba / R Kouba | | |
| 1989 | JSM Chéraga | | |

International career
| 1977–1989 | Algeria | 68 | (15) |
- * Club domestic league appearances and goals

Salah Assad (Arabic: صالح عصاد; born 13 March 1958) is an Algerian former football player and manager who played as a forward.

Assad was born in Larbaâ Nath Irathen. He played for RC Kouba, where he won an Algerian championship in 1981, and in France for FC Mulhouse. For the Algeria national team, he participated at the 1980, 1982, and 1986 African Cup of Nations, 1980 Summer Olympics, and at two edition of FIFA World Cup in 1982 and 1986, scored two goals.

Assad holds the record with Islam Slimani of most scored goals at the World Cup for Algeria, which were both scored in the 1982 World Cup. Slimani in 2014.

== Career ==
Assad started playing young with JSM Cheraga and after with RC Kouba. In 1975, he played with the senior team until 1982 and he won the Algerian championship in 1981.

== Career statistics ==
Scores and results list Algeria's goal tally first, score column indicates score after each Assad goal.

List of international goals scored by Salah Assad
| No. | Date | Venue | Opponent | Score | Result | Competition |
|---|---|---|---|---|---|---|
| 1 | 13 July 1978 | Stade du 5 Juillet, Algiers, Algeria | Egypt | 1–1 | 1–1 | 1978 All-Africa Games |
| 2 | 28 October 1978 | Independence Stadium, Lusaka, Zambia | Zambia | 1–0 | 3–0 | Friendly |
| 3 | 29 September 1979 | Stadion Poljud, Split, Yugoslavia | Greece | 2–0 | 2–0 | 1979 Mediterranean Games |
| 4 | 9 December 1979 | Stade d'Honneur, Casablanca, Morocco | Morocco | 5–1 | 5–1 | 1980 Summer Olympics qualification |
| 5 | 21 December 1979 | Stade du 5 Juillet, Algiers, Algeria | Morocco | 3–0 | 3–0 | 1980 Summer Olympics qualification |
| 6 | 19 March 1980 | Liberty Stadium, Ibadan, Nigeria | Egypt | 1–2 | 2–2 | 1980 African Cup of Nations |
| 7 | 3 April 1981 | 19 June Stadium, Oran, Algeria | Senegal | 2–0 | 2–0 | Friendly |
| 8 | 30 August 1981 | Stade du 19 Juin, Oran, Algeria | Upper Volta | 7–0 | 7–0 | 1982 African Cup of Nations qualification |
| 9 | 7 February 1982 | Stade El Menzah, Tunis, Tunisia | Tunisia | 1–0 | 1–0 | Friendly |
| 10 | 10 March 1982 | March 28 Stadium, Benghazi, Libya | Nigeria | 2–1 | 2–1 | 1982 African Cup of Nations |
| 11 | 16 March 1982 | 28 March Stadium, Benghazi, Tunisia | Ghana | 2–1 | 2–3 | 1982 African Cup of Nations |
| 12 | 28 April 1982 | Stade du 5 Juillet, Algiers, Algeria | Republic of Ireland | 1–0 | 2–0 | Friendly |
| 13 | 24 June 1982 | Estadio Carlos Tartiere, Oviedo, Spain | Chile | 1–0 | 3–2 | 1982 FIFA World Cup |
| 14 | 24 June 1982 | Estadio Carlos Tartiere, Oviedo, Spain | Chile | 2–0 | 3–2 | 1982 FIFA World Cup |
| 15 | 13 November 1988 | Stade du 5 Juillet, Algiers, Algeria | Mali | 2–0 | 7–0 | Friendly |

== Honours ==
RC Kouba

- Algerian League Champion in 1981

Algeria

- Gold medal in the 1978 All-Africa Games in Algiers
- Bronze medal in the 1979 Mediterranean Games in Split
- 2nd in the final of the 1980 African Cup of Nations in Nigeria
- Quarter final round in the 1980 Summer Olympics in Moscow
- 2 participations in FIFA World Cup of 1982 in Spain & 1986 in Mexico

Individual

- Africa Cup of Nations Team of the Tournament:1980, 1982
- Best left forward in 1982 FIFA World Cup
- 2nd best African football player of the year in 1982
