= Football at the 1985 Arab Games =

1985 Arab Games football tournament
Tournament details
- Host country: Morocco
- City: Rabat
- Dates: 4–16 August 1985
- Teams: 15 (from 2 confederations)
- Venue: 4 (in 4 host cities)

Final positions
- Champions: Iraq B (1st title)
- Runners-up: Morocco
- Third place: Algeria B
- Fourth place: Saudi Arabia

Tournament statistics
- Matches played: 18
- Goals scored: 48 (2.67 per match)
- Top scorer(s): (Iraq) Ahmed Radhi (Saudi Arabia) Majed Abdullah (3 goals each)

The 1985 Arab Games football tournament was the 6th edition of the Arab Games men's football tournament. The football tournament was held in Rabat, Morocco between 4–16 August 1985 as part of the 1985 Arab Games.

== Participating teams ==
Eleven teams took part to the tournament, Algeria participated with the B team and Iraq also with the B team in addition to four players from the A team. The following countries participated in the final tournament:

- Algeria B
- Iraq B
- Libya
- Mauritania
- Morocco (hosts)
- North Yemen
- Saudi Arabia
- Somalia
- Syria
- Tunisia
- United Arab Emirates

== Group stage ==
Algeria qualified for the semifinals on a draw between second-placed teams.

=== Group A ===
Team	Pld	W	D	L	GF	GA	GD	Pts
Morocco	3	2	1	0	8	2	+6	5
Tunisia	3	2	1	0	8	3	+5	5
Somalia	3	1	0	2	6	7	–1	2
Mauritania	3	0	0	3	2	12	–10	0

4 August 1985

Morocco	3–0	Somalia
Timoumi; Laghrissi

Moulay Abdellah Stadium, Rabat
4 August 1985

Tunisia	4–0	Mauritania
Hsoumi 5'; Jeridi 45' (pen.); Maâloul 72'; Houarbi 85'

Moulay Abdellah Stadium, Rabat

7 August 1985

Morocco	2–2	Tunisia
? 55' (o.g.); Anafal 69'		Rakbaoui 4'; Hergal 7'

Moulay Abdellah Stadium, Rabat
7 August 1985

Somalia	5–2	Mauritania

Moulay Abdellah Stadium, Rabat

10 August 1985

Morocco	3–0	Mauritania

Moulay Abdellah Stadium, Rabat
10 August 1985

Somalia	1–2	Tunisia
Goal		Jaziri 15' (pen.); Rakbaoui 56'

Moulay Abdellah Stadium, Rabat

=== Group B ===
Team	Pld	W	D	L	GF	GA	GD	Pts
Saudi Arabia	3	3	0	0	5	1	+4	6
Algeria B	3	1	0	2	4	4	0	2
United Arab Emirates	3	1	0	2	2	3	–1	2
North Yemen	3	1	0	2	3	6	–3	2

5 August 1985

United Arab Emirates	1–0	Algeria B

5 August 1985

Saudi Arabia	2–0	North Yemen
Abdullah 76' (pen.); Abu Dawood 79'

Moulay Abdellah Stadium, Rabat

8 August 1985

Saudi Arabia	1–0	United Arab Emirates
Abdullah 38'

Stade d'honneur, Settat
8 August 1985

Algeria B	3–1	North Yemen
Tlemçani; Djahmoune; Bouznada		?

11 August 1985

Saudi Arabia	2–1	Algeria B
Nu'eimeh; Al-Jam'an		Chérif El-Ouazzani

Stade El Bachir, Mohammedia
11 August 1985

North Yemen	2–1	United Arab Emirates
Al-Yaremi; Ghaleb		Al-Talyani

=== Group C ===
Team	Pld	W	D	L	GF	GA	GD	Pts
Iraq B	2	2	0	0	4	0	+4	4
Libya	2	1	0	1	2	2	0	2
Syria	2	0	0	2	0	4	–4	0

3 August 1985

Iraq B	2–0	Libya
Radhi; Abid

Settat

7 August 1985

Syria	0–2	Libya

12 August 1985

Iraq B	2–0	Syria
Allawi; Mahmoud

Casablanca

== Knockout stage ==
Semifinals
13 August – Rabat
Morocco (a.e.t.)	1
Algeria B	0
14 August – Casablanca
Iraq B	2
Saudi Arabia	1

Final
16 August – Rabat
Morocco	0
Iraq B	1
Third place
16 August – Rabat
Algeria B	–
Saudi Arabia (w/o)	–

=== Semifinals ===
13 August 1985

Morocco	1–0 (a.e.t.)	Algeria B
Lamriss (?)

Moulay Abdellah Stadium, Rabat

14 August 1985

Iraq B	2–1	Saudi Arabia
Radhi		Abdullah 21' (pen.)

Stade Mohammed V, Casablanca

=== Third place match ===
16 August 1985

Algeria B	Cancelled (Saudi Arabia withdrew)	Saudi Arabia

=== Final ===
16 August 1985

Morocco	0–1	Iraq B
		Gorgis 8'

Moulay Abdellah Stadium, Rabat
Attendance: 48,000
Referee: Amar Gothari (Algeria)

== Final ranking ==
Rank	Team	Pld	W	D	L	GF	GA	GD	Pts
1	Iraq B	4	4	0	0	7	1	+6	8
2	Morocco	5	3	1	1	9	3	+6	7
3	Algeria B	4	2	0	3	4	5	−1	4
4	Saudi Arabia	4	3	0	2	6	3	+3	6
Eliminated in the group stage
5	Tunisia	3	2	1	0	7	2	+5	5
6	Libya	2	1	0	1	2	2	0	2
7	Somalia	3	1	0	2	5	6	−1	2
8	United Arab Emirates	3	1	0	2	2	3	−1	2
9	North Yemen	3	1	0	2	3	6	−3	2
10	Syria	2	0	0	2	0	4	−4	0
10	Mauritania	3	0	0	3	2	12	−10	0
Total		36	18	2	18	48	48	0	38
