= Football at the 1980 Summer Olympics – Men's African Qualifiers =

1980 Summer Olympics – Men's Football African Qualifiers
- Dates: 25 March 1979 – 13 April 1980

This page provides the summaries of the matches of the qualifying rounds for the football tournament at the 1980 Summer Olympics held in Moscow. Three countries qualified.

== Qualifying rounds ==
=== First round ===
Team 1	Agg.	Team 2	1st leg	2nd leg
Tunisia	1–3	Libya	1–0	0–3
Algeria	1–1 (4–2 p)	Mali	1–0	0–1
Morocco	1–1 (6–5 p)	Senegal	1–0	0–1
Lesotho	7–3	Mauritius	4–1	3–2
Madagascar	3–2	Ethiopia	2–1	1–1
Egypt	w/o	Tanzania	—	—
Kenya	w/o	Sudan	—	—
Liberia	w/o	Ivory Coast	—	—
Sierra Leone	w/o	Guinea	—	—
Ghana	Bye			
Zambia	Bye			

25 March 1979

Tunisia	1–0	Libya
Ben Mahmoud 16'

Stade El Menzah, Tunis
13 April 1979

Libya	3–0	Tunisia
Belhaj 1'; Al-Issawi 31'; Bounwara ...'

11 June Stadium, Tripoli
Attendance: 80,000

Libya won 3–1 on aggregate and advanced to the second round.

6 April 1979

Algeria	1–0	Mali
Belloumi 1'

Stade 5 Juillet 1962, Algiers
22 April 1979

Mali	1–0 (a.e.t.)	Algeria
Zito ...'
Penalties
	2–4

Stade Omnisports, Bamako

Algeria won 4–2 on penalties after 1–1 on aggregate and advanced to the second round.

15 April 1979

Morocco	1–0	Senegal
Acila ...'

Stade Père Jégo, Casablanca
29 April 1979

Senegal	1–0 (a.e.t.)	Morocco
Camara ...'
Penalties
	5–6

Stade Demba Diop, Dakar

Morocco won 6–5 on penalties after 1–1 on aggregate and advanced to the second round.

6 May 1979

Lesotho	4–1	Mauritius
		Noël

..., Maseru
13 May 1979

Mauritius	2–3	Lesotho
Chundunsing; Noël

Stade George V, Curepipe

Lesotho won 7–3 on aggregate and advanced to the second round.

15 May 1979

Madagascar	2–1	Ethiopia

Mahamasina Stadium, Antananarivo
27 May 1979

Ethiopia	1–1	Madagascar

Addis Ababa Stadium, Addis Ababa

Madagascar won 3–2 on aggregate and advanced to the second round.

Egypt	w/o	Tanzania
		withdrew

Egypt advanced to the second round, Tanzania withdrew.

Kenya	w/o	Sudan
		withdrew

Kenya advanced to the second round, Sudan withdrew.

Liberia	w/o	Ivory Coast
		withdrew

Liberia advanced to the second round, Ivory Coast withdrew.

Sierra Leone	w/o	Guinea
		withdrew

Sierra Leone advanced to the second round, Guinea withdrew.

=== Second round ===
Team 1	Agg.	Team 2	1st leg	2nd leg
Sierra Leone	w/o	Liberia	3–1	—
Ghana	5–1	Kenya	4–1	1–0
Morocco	1–8	Algeria	1–5	0–3
Zambia	5–0	Lesotho	0–0	5–0
Madagascar	2–2 (3–4 p)	Egypt	1–1	1–1
Libya	Bye			

17 November 1979

Sierra Leone	3–1	Liberia

Reckrie stadium, Freetown

Liberia	w/o	Sierra Leone
		withdrew

Liberia advanced to the third round, Sierra Leone withdrew in the second leg.

27 November 1979

Ghana	4–1	Kenya
		Obota 63'

Accra Sports Stadium, Accra
12 December 1979

Kenya	0–1	Ghana
		Afriyie 21'

Nairobi City Stadium, Nairobi

Ghana won 5–1 on aggregate and advanced to the third round.

9 December 1979

Morocco	1–5	Algeria
Limane 32' (pen.)		Bensaoula 15', 16', 69'; Guemri 71'; Assad 87'

Stade d'Honneur, Casablanca
Attendance: 50,000
Referee: Alberto Michelotti (Italy)
21 December 1979

Algeria	3–0	Morocco
Belloumi 40'; Kouici 46'; Assad 75'

Stade 5 Juillet, Algiers
Attendance: 30,000
Referee: Erich Linemayr (Austria)

Algeria won 8–1 on aggregate and advanced to the third round.

25 November 1979

Zambia	5–0	Lesotho
Katebe; Chitalu

Independence Stadium, Lusaka
9 December 1979

Lesotho	0–0	Zambia

Setsoto Stadium, Maseru

Zambia won 5–0 on aggregate and advanced to the third round.

9 December 1979

Madagascar	1–1	Egypt
Goal		Abdou 40'

Mahamasina Stadium, Antananarivo
21 December 1979

Egypt	1–1 (a.e.t.)	Madagascar
El Khatib (pen.)		Goal
Penalties
	4–3

Nasser Stadium, Cairo
Attendance: 80,000

Egypt won 4–3 on penalties after 2–2 on aggregate and advanced to the third round.

=== Third round ===
Team 1	Agg.	Team 2	1st leg	2nd leg
Egypt	5–2	Zambia	4–1	1–1
Liberia	2–4	Ghana	0–2	2–2
Algeria	w/o	Libya	—	—

22 February 1980

Egypt	4–1	Zambia
Amer 20'; Abdel Halim 38' (pen.); El Khatib 77', 83' (pen.)		Kaumba 23'

Cairo International Stadium, Cairo
13 April 1980

Zambia	1–1	Egypt
Chola		Khalil 32'

Independence Stadium, Lusaka
Referee: George Courtney (England)

Egypt won 5–2 and qualified for the 1980 Summer Olympics football tournament.

24 February 1980

Liberia	0–2	Ghana

Antoinette Tubman Stadium, Monrovia
13 April 1980

Ghana	2–2	Liberia

Accra Sports Stadium, Accra

Ghana won 4–2 and qualified for the 1980 Summer Olympics football tournament.

Algeria	w/o	Libya
		withdrew

Algeria qualified for the 1980 Summer Olympics football tournament, Libya withdrew.

Note: Due to the American-led political boycott, two countries Egypt and Ghana who qualified did not enter the Final Tournament and were replaced respectively by Zambia and Nigeria which participated with Algeria.
