= Mohamed Zouita =

Moroccan footballer

Personal information
- Date of birth: 1944 (age 81–82)
- Position: Midfielder

Senior career*
Years	Team	Apps	(Gls)
- KAC Kénitra

International career
- Morocco
- * Club domestic league appearances and goals

Mohamed Zouita (born 1944) is a Moroccan former footballer. He competed in the men's tournament at the 1972 Summer Olympics.
