= Mohamed Redouane Guemri =

Algerian footballer (born 1956)

Redouane Guemri
Personal information
- Full name: Mohamed Redouane Guemri
- Date of birth: November 30, 1956 (age 69)
- Place of birth: Oran, Algeria
- Position: Forward

Youth career
- 1969–1972: Nadjah AC

Senior career*
Years	Team	Apps	(Gls)
1972–1973	Nadjah AC	-	(-)
1973–1988	ASM Oran	-	(-)

International career
1976–1982	Algeria	22	(3)
- * Club domestic league appearances and goals

Mohamed Redouane Guemri (born 30 November 1956) is an Algerian former footballer who played as a forward for the Algeria national team. He participated in the 1980 African Cup of Nations.

Redouane Guemri was born in Oran.

== Career statistics ==
=== International goals ===
#	Date	Venue	Opponent	Score	Result	Competition
1.	5 October 1978	Atatürk Stadium, Bursa, Turkey	Turkey	0–1	Win	Friendly
2.	9 December 1979	Stade d'Honneur, Casablanca, Morocco	Morocco	1–5	Win	1980 Summer Olympics qual.
3.	19 December 1982	Stade El Menzah, Tunis, Tunisia	Tunisia	0–1	Win	Friendly
Correct as of 21 January 2017

== Honours ==
=== Personal ===
- Best goalscorer in 1979 Ligue 1 with 11 goals

=== Club ===
- Runner-up of the Algerian Cup in 1981, 1983

=== National team ===
- Gold medal in the 1978 All-Africa Games in Algiers
- Runner-up in the 1980 African Cup of Nations in Nigeria
