= Saad Dahane =

Moroccan footballer

Personal information
- Date of birth: 18 February 1956 (age 70)

International career
Years	Team	Apps	(Gls)
- Morocco

Saad Dahane (born 18 February 1956) is a Moroccan footballer. He competed in the men's tournament at the 1984 Summer Olympics.
