= Driss Bamous =

Moroccan footballer (1942–2015)

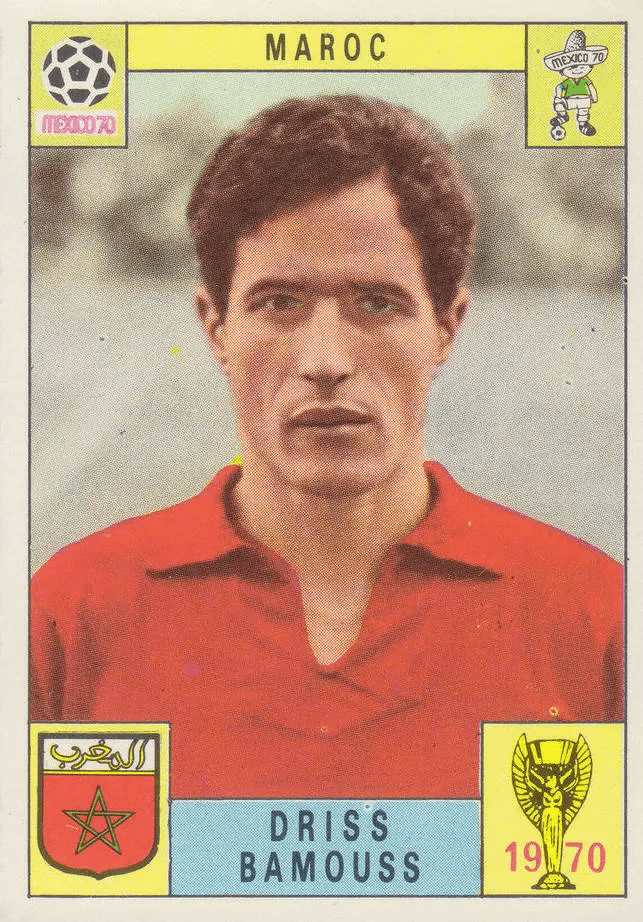
- Bamous at the 1970 FIFA World Cup

Personal information
- Full name: Driss Bamous
- Date of birth: 15 December 1942
- Place of birth: Berrechid, Morocco
- Date of death: 16 April 2015 (aged 72)
- Place of death: Rabat, Morocco
- Height: 1.71 m (5 ft 7 in)
- Position: Midfielder

Senior career*
Years	Team	Apps	(Gls)
1963–1975	FAR Rabat		

International career
1963–1971	Morocco	43	(9)
- * Club domestic league appearances and goals

Driss Bamous (15 December 1942 – 16 April 2015) was a Moroccan football midfielder. He was also a trained professional soldier at the military academy of Saint Cyr, France.

== Career ==
Bamous played club football for FAR Rabat in the Botola. Bamous played for the Morocco national football team at the 1964 Summer Olympics and at the 1970 FIFA World Cup finals. Following his playing career, Bamous became the president of the FRMF and organized the 1988 African Cup of Nations in Morocco. In 2006, he was selected by CAF as one of the best 200 African football players of the last 50 years. He was promoted to brigadier general of the Royal Moroccan Gendarmerie in 2003.

== Death ==
Bamous died in Rabat from a long-term illness.
