= Ali Gagarin =

Sudanese footballer (1949–2025)

Personal information
- Full name: Ali Alhaydar Hassan Hajelsedig Altoum
- Date of birth: 1 April 1949
- Place of birth: Omdurman, Anglo-Egyptian Sudan
- Date of death: 12 February 2025 (aged 75)
- Place of death: Cairo, Egypt
- Position: Forward

Youth career
- 1965–1966: Al-Merrikh

Senior career*
Years	Team	Apps	(Gls)
1966–1976	Al-Hilal		(330)
1976	Al-Nassr		
1977–1978	Al-Hilal		(10)
1979	Stade d'Abidjan		
1979-1980	Al-Hilal		(10)

International career
1967–1979	Sudan	33	(19)
Medal record
Men's football
Representing Sudan
Africa Cup of Nations
Winner	1970 Sudan
- * Club domestic league appearances and goals

Ali Alhaydar Hassan Hajelsedig Altoum (1 April 1949 – 12 February 2025), known as Ali Gagarin, was a Sudanese professional footballer who played as a forward for Al-Hilal Club. He participated in the Africa Cup of Nations 1970 and 1976. He earned his nickname of Ali Gagarin when he played professional football for Al-Hilal, one Sudan's biggest teams. His phenomenal rise in the sport was likened to that of the famous Soviet cosmonaut Yuri Gagarin.

Having retired from playing sport, he became an administrator who held posts such as vice-president at Al-Hilal and also in politics, as a director general at the Ministry of Foreign Affairs ambassador. He died in Cairo on 12 February 2025, at the age of 75.

== Career statistics ==
Scores and results list Sudan's goal tally first, score column indicates score after each Gagarin goal.

List of international goals scored by Ali Gagarin
No.	Date	Venue	Opponent	Score	Result	Competition
1	11 May 1969	Khartoum, Sudan	Ethiopia		3–1	1970 FIFA World Cup qualification
2	11 May 1969	Khartoum, Sudan	Ethiopia		3–1	1970 FIFA World Cup qualification
3	6 February 1970	Khartoum, Sudan	Ethiopia		3–0	1970 Africa Cup of Nations
4	28 September 1974	Damascus, Syria	North Yemen		6–0	1974 Kuneitra Cup
5	28 September 1974	Damascus, Syria	North Yemen		6–0	1974 Kuneitra Cup
6	28 September 1974	Damascus, Syria	North Yemen		6–0	1974 Kuneitra Cup
7	30 September 1974	Damascus, Syria	Palestine		3–1	1974 Kuneitra Cup
8	23 March 1975	Khartoum, Sudan	Kenya		1–0	1976 African Cup of Nations qualification
9	6 April 1975	Nairobi, Kenya	Kenya		2–0	1976 African Cup of Nations qualification
10	6 April 1975	Nairobi, Kenya	Kenya		2–0	1976 African Cup of Nations qualification
11	30 May 1975	Khartoum, Sudan	Egypt		1–0	Football at the 1976 Summer Olympics - Men's qualification
12	6 July 1975	Tunis, Tunisia	Tunisia		2–3	1976 African Cup of Nations qualification
13	15 August 1975	Khartoum, Sudan	Tunisia		2–1	1976 African Cup of Nations qualification
14	1 March 1976	Dire Dawa, Ethiopia	Morocco		2–2	1976 Africa Cup of Nations
15	1 March 1976	Dire Dawa, Ethiopia	Morocco		2–2	1976 Africa Cup of Nations
16	6 March 1976	Dire Dawa, Ethiopia	Zaire		1–1	1976 Africa Cup of Nations
17	28 March 1976	Lusaka, Zambia	Zambia		2–2	Football at the 1976 Summer Olympics - Men's qualification
18	28 March 1976	Lusaka, Zambia	Zambia		2–2	Football at the 1976 Summer Olympics - Men's qualification

== Honours ==
Al-Hilal Club

- Sudan Premier League: 1966, 1969, 1973

Al Nassr FC

- Saudi Federation Cup: 1976

Sudan

- African Cup of Nations: 1970
