= Dag Hammarskjöld Stadium =

Stadium in Ndola, Zambia

Coordinates: 12.9776°S 28.6634°E

Dag Hammarskjöld Stadium, also known as the Trade Fair Grounds, was a multi-use stadium in Ndola, Zambia, named after former Secretary-General of the United Nations Dag Hammarskjöld. It was used mostly for football matches and served as the home for Ndola United Football Club. The stadium had a capacity of 18,000 people. In 1988 the stadium was razed to pave way for a new stadium. Construction of the new stadium didn't begin until 2001, and it is not known whether construction will continue.
