= Houcine Anafal =

Moroccan footballer

Personal information
- Date of birth: 15 September 1952
- Place of birth: Kenitra, Morocco
- Date of death: 22 August 2012 (aged 59)
- Place of death: Mehdia, Morocco
- Position: Midfielder

Senior career*
Years	Team	Apps	(Gls)
–1974	KAC Kénitra		
1974–1976	Rennes	66	(10)
1976–1979	KAC Kénitra		
1979–1981	Rennes	45	(10)
1981–1983	Stade Quimpérois		

International career
1973–1978	Morocco		
- * Club domestic league appearances and goals

Houcine Anafal (15 September 1952 – 22 August 2012) was a Moroccan professional footballer who played for clubs in Europe, including Stade Rennais F.C. as well as the Morocco national football team.

== Club career ==
Born in Kenitra, Anafal played senior football with KAC Kénitra over two spells, winning the 1972–73 Botola with the club. He also had two spells in France's Ligue 1 with Rennes, and one spell in Ligue 2 with Stade Quimpérois.

== International career ==
Anafal made several appearances for the full Morocco national football team, including qualifying matches for the 1974 FIFA World Cup and 1978 FIFA World Cup. He also participated at the 1978 African Cup of Nations.
