= Mustafa El Haddaoui =

Moroccan footballer (born 1961)

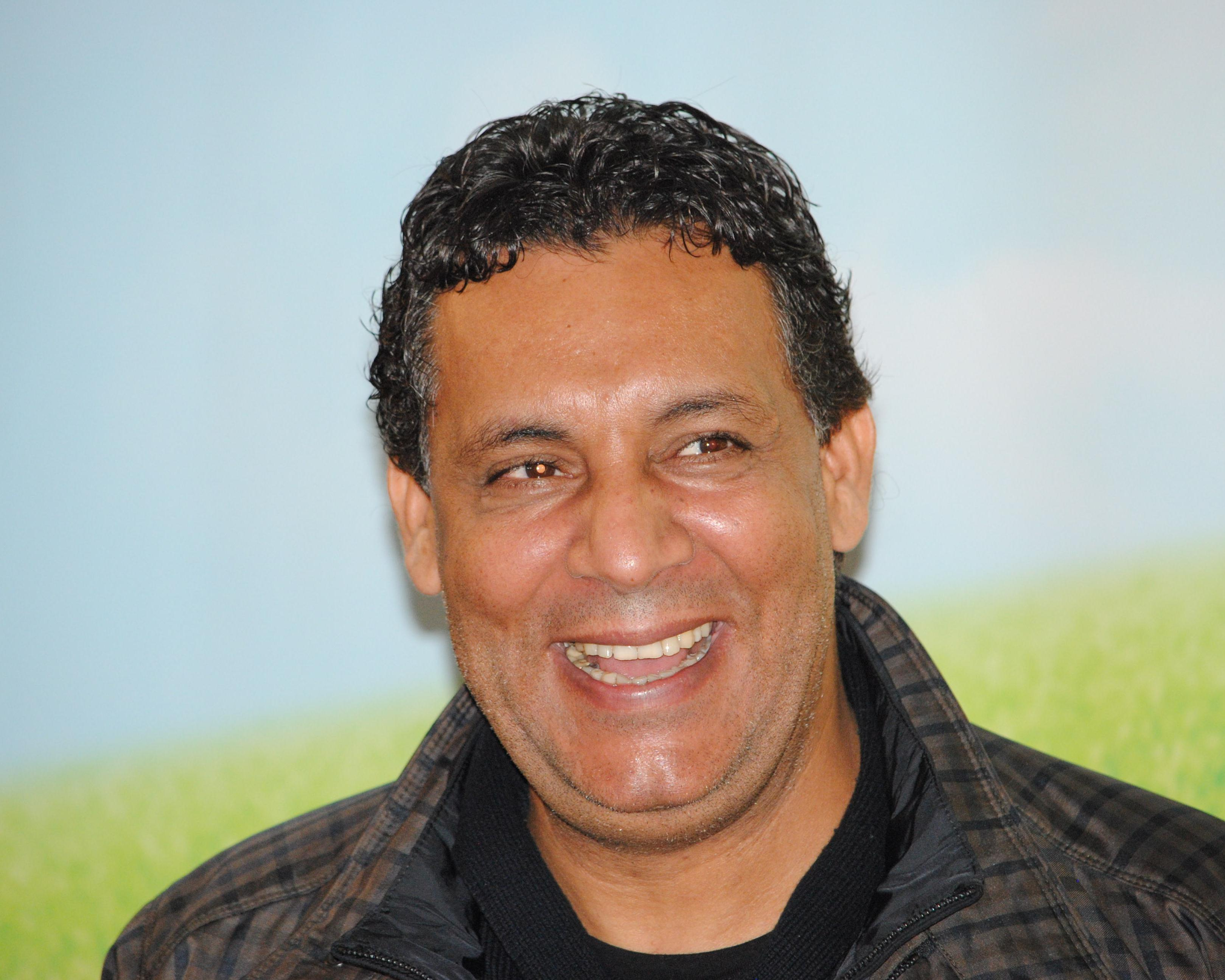
- El Haddaoui in 2014

Personal information
- Full name: Mustapha El-Hadaoui
- Date of birth: 28 July 1961 (age 65)
- Place of birth: Casablanca, Morocco
- Height: 1.81 m (5 ft 11 in)
- Position: Midfielder

Senior career*
Years	Team	Apps	(Gls)
1979–1985	Raja Casablanca		
1985–1987	Lausanne Sports	23	(7)
1987–1988	AS Saint-Étienne	33	(10)
1988–1990	OGC Nice	58	(4)
1990–1993	RC Lens	84	(14)
1993–1995	Angers SCO	65	(9)
1996–1997	SS Jeanne d'Arc		

International career
1982–1994	Morocco	47	(10)
- * Club domestic league appearances and goals

Mustafa El Haddaoui, also spelled Mustapha El-Hadaoui (Arabic: مصطفى الحداوي; born 28 July 1961) is a Moroccan former professional footballer who played as a midfielder.

He spent his most of his professional career in France and was also part of the Moroccan squad at the 1986 and 1994 FIFA World Cup. He also competed for Morocco at the 1984 Summer Olympics.

He holds Moroccan and French nationalities.

== International goals ==
Scores and results list Morocco's goal tally first.

#	Date	Venue	Opponent	Score	Result	Competition
1.	24 October 1984	Prince Moulay Abdellah Stadium, Rabat	Canada	1–0	3–2	Friendly
2.	24 October 1984	Prince Moulay Abdellah Stadium, Rabat	Canada	3–2	3–2	Friendly
3.	7 April 1985	Prince Moulay Abdellah Stadium, Rabat	Malawi	1–0	2–0	1986 World Cup qualifier
4.	15 November 1987	Stade Mohamed V, Casablanca	Ivory Coast	1–0	2–1	1988 Summer Olympics qualifier
5.	16 March 1988	Stade Mohamed V, Casablanca	Algeria	1–0	1–0	1988 African Cup of Nations
