= Ahmed Faras =

Moroccan footballer (1946–2025)

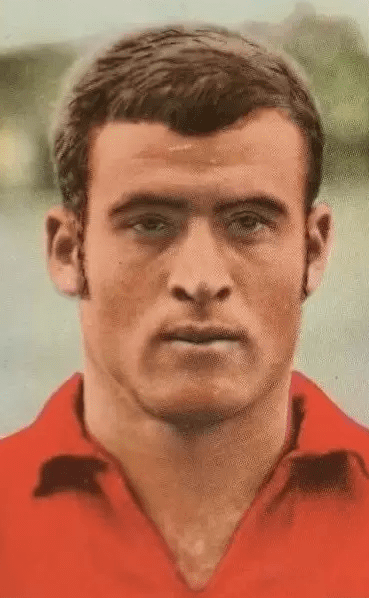
- Faras with Morocco at the 1970 FIFA World Cup

Personal information
- Date of birth: 7 December 1946
- Place of birth: Mohammedia, Morocco
- Date of death: 16 July 2025 (aged 78)
- Place of death: Mohammedia, Morocco
- Height: 1.72 m (5 ft 8 in)
- Position: Striker

Senior career*
Years	Team	Apps	(Gls)
1965–1982	Chabab Mohammédia		(127)

International career
1966–1979	Morocco	94	(36)
Medal record
Representing Morocco
Africa Cup of Nations
Winner	1976 Ethiopia
- * Club domestic league appearances and goals

Ahmed Faras (Arabic: أَحْمَد فَرَس; 7 December 1946 – 16 July 2025) was a Moroccan professional footballer who played as a striker for Chabab Mohammédia at club level and Morocco internationally.

Faras was named African Footballer of the Year in 1975. In 2006, Faras was selected by CAF as one of the best 200 African football players of the last 50 years.

With 36 international goals, he is Morocco's all time top goalscorer.

== Club career ==
Faras played for Chabab Mohammédia between 1965 and 1982, winning the Moroccan Throne Cup in 1972 and 1975, and the Moroccan League in 1980 and finishing as the league's top-scorer in 1969 and 1973 with 16 goals. He retired in 1982, after spending 17 years with the club.

== International career ==
Faras was a member of Morocco national team from 1965 to 1979, wearing the captain's armband for eight consecutive years, starting from 1971. At international level, Faras took part in the 1970 FIFA World Cup in Mexico, and the 1972 Summer Olympics in Munich, before leading his team to African Cup of Nations success in 1976. Faras scored a total of 42 goals in 94 games for his national side.

=== 1972 Summer Olympics ===
The Morocco national team was placed in Group A, with West Germany, Malaysia, United States. Faras played a major role in the 1972 Summer Olympics. He was the top scorer for the Morocco national team with three goals scored all against Malaysia making it his first and only hat-trick for the National team.

=== 1976 Africa Cup of Nations ===
In the 1976 Africa Cup of Nations, Morocco was placed in Group B. Morocco tied its first match against Sudan and won its second against Zaire. Morocco played the final game against Nigeria, to determine the group winner, and Morocco won 3–1. In the final round Morocco defeated Egypt 2–1 with a goal scored by Faras in the 23rd minute. They played against Nigeria again and won 2–1, with their first goal scored by Faras in the 82nd minute. Morocco was to play its final against Guinea and needed a tie to win the cup. The match ended in a tie and Morocco won the cup. Faras was named best player of the tournament and was the second top goalscorer.

== Death ==
On 16 July 2025, Faras died after a long illness at the age of 78.

== Career statistics ==
Appearances and goals by national team and year
National team	Year	Apps	Goals
Morocco
Morocco	1966	2	0
Morocco	1967	6	1
Morocco	1968	4	2
Morocco	1969	7	1
Morocco	1970	3	2
Morocco	1971	9	4
Morocco	1972	16	9
Morocco	1973	8	5
Morocco	1974	11	3
Morocco	1975	7	4
Morocco	1976	11	5
Morocco	1977	1	0
Morocco	1978	3	0
Morocco	1979	6	6
Total		94	42

== Honours ==
Chabab Mohammédia

- Botola Pro: 1980
- Moroccan Throne Cup: 1972, 1975
- Moroccan Super Cup: 1975
- Maghreb Cup Winners Cup: 1973
- Maghreb Cup Winners Cup runner-up: 1975

Morocco

- African Cup of Nations: 1976
- Kuneitra Cup: 1974
- Pan Arab Games: 1976

Individual

- African Footballer of the Year: 1975
- Botola Pro Top Goalscorer: 1969 (16 goals), 1973 (16 goals)
- Player of the Tournament: Africa Cup of Nations: 1976
- Africa Cup of Nations Team of the Tournament: 1976
- Kuneitra Cup Top Goalscorer: 1974
- IFFHS All-time Morocco Men's Dream Team

Records

- Morocco all-time top goalscorer (36 goals)
- Botola all-time top goalscorer (125 goals)
- Chabab Mohammédia all-time top goalscorer

== See also ==
- List of top international men's football goal scorers by country
