= Larbi Ahardane =

Moroccan footballer (born 1954)

Personal information
- Date of birth: 6 June 1954 (age 72)
- Place of birth: Casablanca, Morocco
- Position: Defender

Senior career*
Years	Team	Apps	(Gls)
1968–1983	Wydad AC		

International career
- Morocco
- * Club domestic league appearances and goals

Larbi Ahardane (born 6 June 1954) is a Moroccan footballer who played as a defender. He competed in the men's tournament at the 1972 Summer Olympics.
