= Ahmed Najah =

Moroccan footballer (born 1947)

Personal information
- Date of birth: 1947 (age 78–79)
- Position: Defender

International career
| Years | Team | Apps | (Gls) |
- Morocco

Ahmed Najah (Arabic: أَحْمَد نَجَاح; born 1947) is a Moroccan former footballer. He competed in the men's tournament at the 1972 Summer Olympics.
