= Mokhtar Kalem =

Algerian footballer (born 1944)

Personal information
- Date of birth: 10 October 1944 (age 82)
- Place of birth: Algiers, Algeria

International career
Years	Team	Apps	(Gls)
1967–1972	Algeria	13	(8)

Mokhtar Kalem (born 10 October 1944) is an Algerian footballer. He played in 13 matches for the Algeria national football team from 1967 to 1972. He was also named in Algeria's squad for the 1968 African Cup of Nations tournament.
