= Hassan Amcharrat =

Moroccan footballer (1948–2023)

Personal information
- Date of birth: 1948
- Place of birth: Mohammedia, French protectorate in Morocco
- Date of death: 22 July 2023 (aged 75)
- Place of death: Mohammedia, Morocco
- Position: Forward

Senior career*
Years	Team	Apps	(Gls)
1965–1972	Chabab Mohammédia	104	(61)
1972–1981	Raja Casablanca	151	(67)
Total		255	(128)

International career
1971–1979	Morocco	39	(18)
Medal record
Representing Morocco
Africa Cup of Nations
Winner	1976 Ethiopia
- * Club domestic league appearances and goals

Hassan Amcharrat (Arabic: حسن أمشراط; 1948 – 22 July 2023), known as Acila (Arabic: عسيلة), was a Moroccan footballer who played as a forward in the 1970s. At the international level, he capped for the Morocco national team, for which he played 39 matches and scored 18 goals.

== International career ==
Amcharrat participated in two African Cup of Nations in the 1976 African Cup of Nations and the 1978 African Cup of Nations. In the first, he won the tournament, without scoring a goal. In the second, he scored the only two goals for Morocco, against Tunisia and Congo. Morocco was this time eliminated in the first round.

Amcharrat also took part in 1974 FIFA World Cup qualification and 1978 FIFA World Cup qualification.

== Death ==
Amcharrat died on 22 July 2023, at the age of 75.

== Honours ==
Chabab Mohammédia

- Moroccan Throne Cup: 1974–75
- Moroccan Super Cup: 1975

Morocco

- African Cup of Nations: 1976
