= Obafemi Awolowo Stadium =

Football stadium in Ibadan, Nigeria

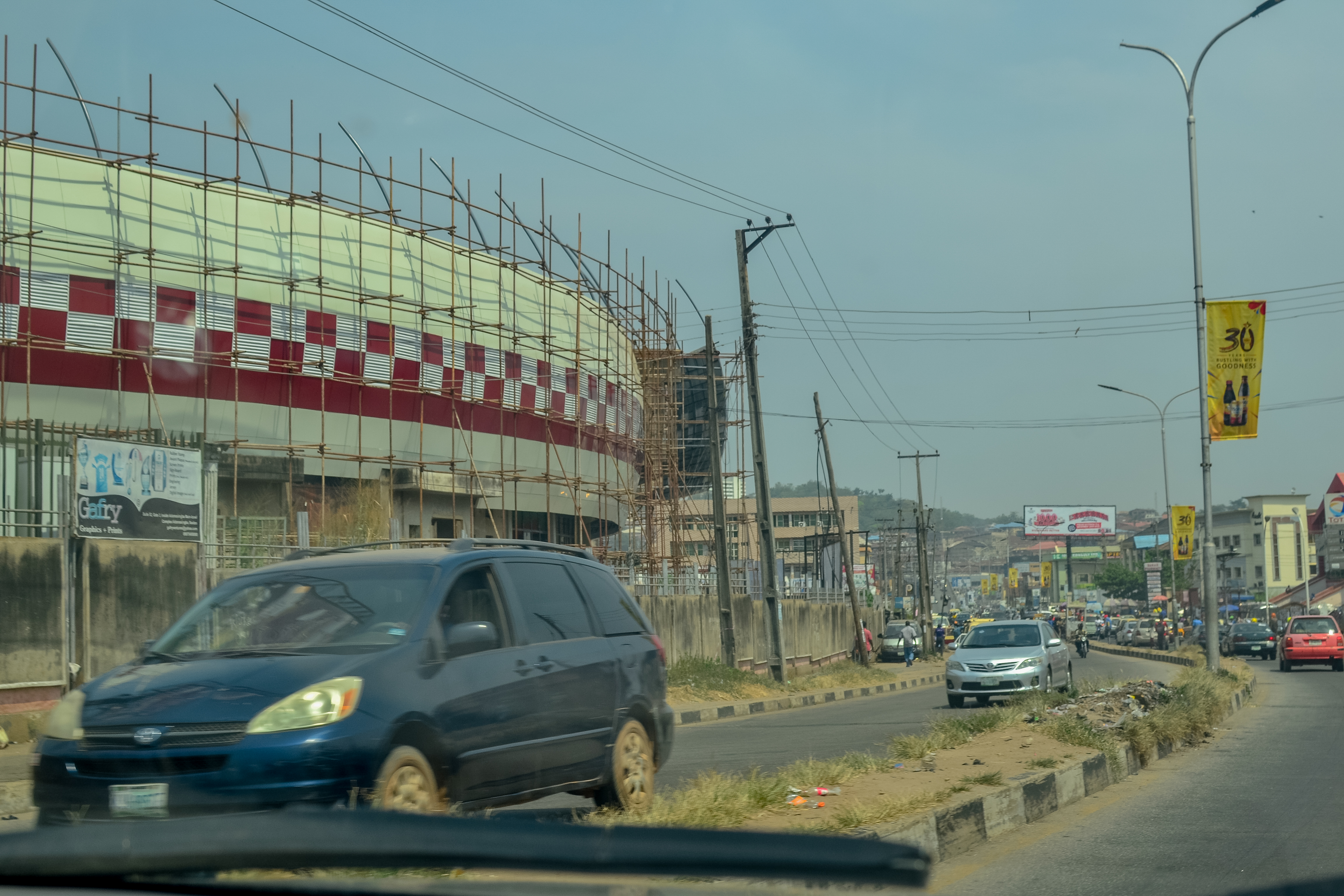
- Interactive map of Obafemi Awolowo Stadium
- Full name: Obafemi Awolowo Stadium
- Former names: Liberty Stadium
- Address: Ibadan 7.366031°N 3.874151°E
- Capacity: 25,000

Construction
- Opened: 1960

The Obafemi Awolowo Stadium in Ibadan, Nigeria, originally known as Liberty Stadium until 2010 is a football stadium with a capacity of 25,000 seats. It is located at Liberty road, Ring Road

== History ==
=== Construction ===
The stadium was opened in 1960 during the tenure of Chief Obafemi Awolowo who was serving as the Premier of the Western Region at the time. It was named Liberty Stadium in honor of Nigeria's independence. Constructed by direct labour under the supervision of the regional Ministry of Works and Transport, the stadium was the central location of sports in the old Western region of Nigeria. It was sited at the southern end of Ibadan in 1960 near the summit of a hill, and located close to a bypass that leads to the Ibadan-Abeokuta and Ibadan-Lagos roads.

At its inception, besides the football pitch in the main bowl with floodlights, the stadium boasted the indoor sports halls, swimming pool, courts for tennis, volleyball, handball, basketball, hockey, etc.

=== Boxing ===
On August 10, 1963, the stadium hosted the first ever boxing world title fight in Africa. The match was initially slated for July 13, 1963. This was for the Middleweight Championship of the World belt and was fought between Nigeria's own Dick Tiger and Gene Fullmer of the US.

=== African Cup of Nations ===
In 1980, the stadium hosted several matches during the African Cup of Nations, including a semi-final between Algeria and Egypt.

=== FIFA World Youth Championship ===
In 1999, the Liberty Stadium was selected along with eight other stadiums in Nigeria to host the 1999 FIFA World Youth Championship. The stadium hosted all of the Group C matches, one of the Round of 16 matches, and one of the quarter-final matches.

=== Renaming ===
On November 12, 2010, the stadium was renamed as the Obafemi Awolowo Stadium. The renaming of the stadium was announced by the then Nigerian president, Dr. Goodluck Jonathan, when he visited Chief Obafemi Awolowo's widow, Chief (Mrs.) Hannah Awolowo.

=== Revitalization ===
In 2024, the National Sports Commission (NSC) announced a partnership with Tripple 44 Football Academy to revamp an underutilized section of the Obafemi Awolowo (Liberty) Stadium, Ibadan. The project, spearheaded by Tripple 44 Academy CEO Olatunji Okuku, aims to transform a former dump site into a modern football facility.

Okuku emphasized the significance of the initiative, stating, "We saw immense potential in this site, which has been lying fallow and, at one point, became a hideout for kidnappers. This facility will be a game-changer for grassroots football in Ibadan and across Nigeria. The project includes an 11-a-side football pitch and a 7-a-side mini-pitch, supporting grassroots development and talent discovery.

NSC Chairman Shehu Dikko praised the collaboration, highlighting the importance of private-sector involvement in sports infrastructure development. Tripple 44 Academy has committed to fully funding and maintaining the facility, aligning with efforts to enhance Nigeria’s sports infrastructure.

== Notable football events ==
=== 1980 African Cup of Nations ===
Date	Team 1	Result	Team 2	Round
9 March 1980	Ghana	0–0	Algeria	Group B
9 March 1980	Morocco	1–1	Guinea	Group B
13 March 1980	Algeria	1–0	Morocco	Group B
13 March 1980	Ghana	1–0	Guinea	Group B
16 March 1980	Algeria	3–2	Guinea	Group B
16 March 1980	Morocco	1–0	Ghana	Group B
19 March 1980	Algeria	2–2 (4–2 p)	Egypt	Semi-final

=== 1999 FIFA World Youth Championship ===
Date	Team 1	Result	Team 2	Attendance	Round
4 April 1999	Australia	3–1	Saudi Arabia	2,000	Group C
4 April 1999	Mexico	1–0	Republic of Ireland	3,000	Group C
7 April 1999	Australia	1–3	Mexico	500	Group C
7 April 1999	Saudi Arabia	0–2	Republic of Ireland	1,000	Group C
10 April 1999	Australia	0–4	Republic of Ireland	800	Group C
10 April 1999	Saudi Arabia	1–1	Mexico	2,000	Group C
15 April 1999	Mexico	4–1	Argentina	16,000	Round of 16
18 April 1999	Japan	2–0	Mexico	17,000	Quarter-final
