= 1990 FIFA World Cup qualification – CAF second round =

Football tournament qualification stage

The CAF second round was the second stage of qualification for the 1990 FIFA World Cup in the Confederation of African Football (CAF) zone.

The eight teams advancing from the first round were joined by the eight highest ranked African nations: Algeria, Cameroon, Ivory Coast, Egypt, Kenya, Morocco, Nigeria and Zaire.

== Format ==
The sixteen teams were drawn into four groups of four. Each group contained two of the seeded teams, and two teams that had advanced from the first round. The teams would play against each other on a home-and-away basis. The four group winners advanced to the Final Round.

== Group A ==
	Pld	W	D	L	GF	GA	GD	Pts
Algeria	4	3	1	0	6	1	+5	7
Ivory Coast	4	1	2	1	5	1	+4	4
Zimbabwe	4	0	1	3	1	10	−9	1
Libya	0	0	0	0	0	0	0	0

	(Algeria)	(Ivory Coast)	(Zimbabwe)
Algeria	–	1–0	3–0
Ivory Coast	0–0	–	5–0
Zimbabwe	1–2	0–0	–

Libya withdrew after playing their first group match; their second game was originally awarded to opponents Algeria by walkover, but all Libyan results were later annulled by FIFA.

6 January 1989

Algeria	3–0	Zimbabwe
Menad 10', 26'; Madjer 65'

Stade 19 Mai 1956, Annaba
Attendance: 50,000
Referee: Mohamed Hafez (Egypt)

8 January 1989

Ivory Coast	Annulled (1–0)	Libya
Bamba 80'

Stade Félix Houphouët-Boigny, Abidjan
Attendance: 30,032
Referee: Simon Bantsimba (Congo)

20 January 1989

Libya	w/o (0–2)	Algeria
Forfeited

June 11 Stadium, Tripoli
Referee: Neji Jouini (Tunisia)

22 January 1989

Zimbabwe	0–0	Ivory Coast

National Stadium, Harare
Attendance: 21,121
Referee: Bester Kalombo (Malawi)

11 June 1989

Ivory Coast	0–0	Algeria

Stade Félix Houphouët-Boigny, Abidjan
Attendance: 50,000
Referee: Ali Bin Nasser (Tunisia)

25 June 1989

Zimbabwe	1–2	Algeria
Ndunduma 90'		Menad 38'; Madjer 87'

National Stadium, Harare
Attendance: 15,000
Referee: Tesfaye Gebreyesus (Ethiopia)

13 August 1989

Ivory Coast	5–0	Zimbabwe
Ben Salah 30', 47'; Akenon 71' (pen.); Amani 81'; Bamba 89'

Stade Félix Houphouët-Boigny, Abidjan
Referee: Badou Jasseh (Gambia)

25 August 1989

Algeria	1–0	Ivory Coast
Madjer 56'

Stade 19 Mai 1956, Annaba
Attendance: 50 000
Referee: Badara Sène (Senegal)

== Group B ==
	Pld	W	D	L	GF	GA	GD	Pts
Egypt	6	3	2	1	6	2	+4	8
Liberia	6	2	2	2	2	3	−1	6
Malawi	6	1	3	2	3	4	−1	5
Kenya	6	1	3	2	2	4	−2	5

	(Egypt)	(Kenya)	(Liberia)	(Malawi)
Egypt	–	2–0	2–0	1–0
Kenya	0–0	–	1–0	1–1
Liberia	1–0	0–0	–	1–0
Malawi	1–1	1–0	0–0	–

6 January 1989

Egypt	2–0	Liberia
Ala'a 23'; El-Akad 42'

Cairo Stadium, Cairo
Attendance: 70,000
Referee: Abdelali Naciri (Morocco)

7 January 1989

Kenya	1–1	Malawi
Dawo 47'		McDonald 2'

Moi International Sports Centre, Nairobi
Referee: Hassan Abdulle Ahmed (Somalia)

21 January 1989

Malawi	1–1	Egypt
Kayira 89'		Hesham 60'

Silver Stadium, Lilongwe
Referee: Hafid Tahir (Tanzania)

22 January 1989

Liberia	0–0	Kenya

National Stadium, Monrovia
Attendance: 25,000
Referee: Linus Mba (Nigeria)

10 June 1989

Kenya	0–0	Egypt

Moi International Sports Centre, Nairobi
Referee: Joel Dwarf Mondoka (Zambia)

11 June 1989

Liberia	1–0	Malawi
Weah 36'

National Stadium, Monrovia
Attendance: 28,000
Referee: Laryea Louis (Ghana)

24 June 1989

Malawi	1–0	Kenya
Kayira 55'

Silver Stadium, Lilongwe
Referee: John N'Khathazo (Zimbabwe)

25 June 1989

Liberia	1–0	Egypt
Debbah 45'

National Stadium, Monrovia
Attendance: 22,000
Referee: Celestin N'Cho (Ivory Coast)

12 August 1989

Egypt	1–0	Malawi
Hesham 28'

Cairo Stadium, Cairo
Attendance: 55,000
Referee: Hassan Ahmed Abdulle (Somalia)
12 August 1989

Kenya	1–0	Liberia
Onyango 24'

Moi International Sports Centre, Nairobi
Attendance: 30,000
Referee: Mohamed Abdel Salam Gasmalla (Sudan)

26 August 1989

Egypt	2–0	Kenya
Hesham 58'; I. Hossan 62'

Cairo Stadium, Cairo
Attendance: 47,000
Referee: Hafidh Tahir (Tanzania)
26 August 1989

Malawi	0–0	Liberia

Silver Stadium, Lilongwe
Referee: Joel Dwarf Mondoka (Zambia)

== Group C ==
	Pld	W	D	L	GF	GA	GD	Pts
Cameroon	6	4	1	1	9	6	+3	9
Nigeria	6	3	1	2	7	5	+2	7
Angola	6	1	2	3	6	7	−1	4
Gabon	6	2	0	4	5	9	−4	4

	(Angola)	(Cameroon)	(Gabon)	(Nigeria)
Angola	–	1–2	2–0	2–2
Cameroon	1–1	–	2–1	1–0
Gabon	1–0	1–3	–	2–1
Nigeria	1–0	2–0	1–0	–

7 January 1989

Nigeria	1–0	Gabon
Odegbami 5'

Nnamdi Azikiwe Stadium, Enugu
Attendance: 50,000
Referee: Badou Jasseh (Gambia)

8 January 1989

Cameroon	1–1	Angola
Djonkep 75'		Jesus 11'

Stade Omnisports, Yaoundé
Attendance: 50,000
Referee: Dodji Hounnake-Kouassi (Togo)

22 January 1989

Gabon	1–3	Cameroon
Manon 33'		Omam-Biyik 26'; Kana-Biyik 39'; Mbouh 85'

Stade Omnisports, Libreville
Attendance: 30,000
Referee: Bakary Sarr (Senegal)

22 January 1989

Angola	2–2	Nigeria
Vieira Dias 30'; Jesus 62'		Keshi 8'; Obiku 67'

Estádio da Cidadela, Luanda
Attendance: 60,000
Referee: Joel Mondoka (Zambia)

10 June 1989

Nigeria	2–0	Cameroon
Keshi 43'; Siasia 86'

Liberty Stadium, Ibadan
Attendance: 50,000
Referee: Mohamed Hossam El-Din (Egypt)

11 June 1989

Angola	2–0	Gabon
Maluka 7', 28'

Estádio da Cidadela, Luanda
Referee: Celestin N'Cho (Ivory Coast)

25 June 1989

Angola	1–2	Cameroon
Paulão 5'		Omam-Biyik 59'; Kana-Biyik 70'

Estádio da Cidadela, Luanda
Attendance: 60,000
Referee: Simon Bantsimba (Congo)
25 June 1989

Gabon	2–1	Nigeria
Ondeno 32'; Minko 37'		Siasia 57'

Stade Omnisports, Libreville
Attendance: 30,000
Referee: Mark Dormoh (Liberia)

12 August 1989

Nigeria	1–0	Angola
Keshi 44'

National Stadium, Lagos
Attendance: 100,000
Referee: Dodji Hounnake-Kouassi (Togo)

Nigerian player Samuel Okwaraji died during this match.

13 August 1989

Cameroon	2–1	Gabon
Kana-Biyik 32'; Mbouh 38'		Nzamba 78'

Stade Omnisports, Yaoundé
Attendance: 45,000
Referee: Idrissa Sarr (Mauritania)

27 August 1989

Cameroon	1–0	Nigeria
Omam-Biyik 31'

Stade Omnisports, Yaoundé
Attendance: 90,000
Referee: Neji Jouini (Tunisia)
27 August 1989

Gabon	1–0	Angola
Minko 24'

Stade Omnisports, Libreville
Referee: Abdellah Naciri (Morocco)

== Group D ==
	Pld	W	D	L	GF	GA	GD	Pts
Tunisia	6	3	1	2	5	5	0	7
Zambia	6	3	0	3	7	6	+1	6
Zaire	6	2	2	2	7	7	0	6
Morocco	6	1	3	2	4	5	−1	5

	(Morocco)	(Tunisia)	(Zaire)	(Zambia)
Morocco	–	0–0	1–1	1–0
Tunisia	2–1	–	1–0	1–0
Zaire	0–0	3–1	–	1–0
Zambia	2–1	1–0	4–2	–

8 January 1989

Morocco	1–0	Zambia
Rhiati 39'

Prince Moulay Abdellah Stadium, Rabat
Attendance: 35,000
Referee: Bashir Salem (Libya)
8 January 1989

Zaire	3–1	Tunisia
Mapuata 23', 33'; Wawa 61'		Limam 7'

Stade du 20 Mai, Kinshasa
Attendance: 21,900
Referee: Tadesse Degefa (Ethiopia)

22 January 1989

Tunisia	2–1	Morocco
Abdelli 37'; Dhiab 44'		Bouderbala 4'

Stade El Menzah, Tunis
Attendance: 45,000
Referee: Idrissa Sarr (Mauritania)
22 January 1989

Zambia	4–2	Zaire
Nyirenda 10'; Msiska 17'; Makinka 25'; Bwalya 75'		Kabongo 29', 78'

Independence Stadium, Lusaka
Referee: Sydney Picon-Ackong (Mauritius)

11 June 1989

Zaire	0–0	Morocco

Stade du 20 Mai, Kinshasa
Attendance: 50,000
Referee: Badara Sène (Senegal)
11 June 1989

Zambia	1–0	Tunisia
Makinka 73'

Independence Stadium, Lusaka
Referee: Eganaden Cadressen (Mauritius)

25 June 1989

Tunisia	1–0	Zaire
Maâloul 74' (pen.)

Stade El Menzah, Tunis
Attendance: 25,000
Referee: Mohamed Hansal (Algeria)
25 June 1989

Zambia	2–1	Morocco
Musonda 42'; Bwalya 87'		Timoumi 73'

Independence Stadium, Lusaka
Attendance: 40,000
Referee: Bester Kalombo (Malawi)

13 August 1989

Morocco	0–0	Tunisia

Stade Mohamed V, Casablanca
Attendance: 35,111
Referee: Jean-Fidele Diramba (Gabon)
13 August 1989

Zaire	1–0	Zambia
Kabongo 16'

Stade du 20 Mai, Kinshasa
Referee: Mohamed Mohamed Hafez (Egypt)

27 August 1989

Morocco	1–1	Zaire
Madih 58'		Makukula 47'

Stade Municipal, Kenitra
Attendance: 1,839
Referee: Abderrahmane Bergui (Algeria)
27 August 1989

Tunisia	1–0	Zambia
Mahjoubi 75'

Stade El Menzah, Tunis
Attendance: 45,000
Referee: Idrissa Traoré (Mali)
