= 1990 African Cup of Nations qualification =

Football tournament

This page details the qualifying process for the 1990 African Cup of Nations in Algeria. Algeria, as hosts, and Cameroon, as title holders, qualified automatically.

== Qualifying tournament ==
Algeria qualified as hosts
Cameroon qualified as holders

=== Preliminary round ===
Team 1	Agg.	Team 2	1st leg	2nd leg
Tanzania	2–2 (1–3 p)	Swaziland	1–1	1–1
Angola	4–1	Equatorial Guinea	4–1	0–0
Liberia	1–4	Mali	0–1	1–3
Mauritius	3–1	Seychelles	3–0	0–1
Gabon	3–1	Burkina Faso	3–0	0–1
Ethiopia	w/o	Uganda	—	—
Guinea	w/o	Mauritania	—	—
Libya	w/o	Madagascar	—	—
Mozambique	w/o	Gambia	—	—

1 October 1988

Tanzania	1 – 1	Swaziland
Gaga 57' (pen.)		Goal

Dar es Salaam
Referee: Katongo Kabungo (Zambia)
16 October 1988

Swaziland	1 – 1	Tanzania
Goal		Fumo 88'
Penalties
	3 – 1

Mbabane
Referee: John Nkathazo (Zimbabwe)

Swaziland won 3–1 on penalty shootout after 2–2 on aggregate.

5 October 1988

Angola	4 – 1	Equatorial Guinea
Mendinho 43'; Barbosa 46'; Vieira Dias 54', 89'		61' Pedro

Luanda
Referee: Wa Ntambidila (Zaire)
16 October 1988

Equatorial Guinea	0 – 0	Angola

Malabo
Referee: Pierre Alain Mounguengui (Gabon)

Angola won 4–1 on aggregate.

2 October 1988

Liberia	0 – 1	Mali
		Cissé 14'

Monrovia
Referee: Selemani Tambwe (Burundi)
16 October 1988

Mali	3 – 1	Liberia
Cissé 17'; Y.Traoré 36'; Diarra 87'		Sogbie 89'

Bamako
Referee: Saidou Sowe (Gambia)

Mali won 4–1 on aggregate.

2 October 1988

Mauritius	3 – 0	Seychelles

Curepipe
Referee: Wallace Mabuza (Swaziland)
16 October 1988

Seychelles	1 – 0	Mauritius
Dorasamy 62'

Victoria
Referee: William Ochieng (Kenya)

Mauritius won 3–1 on aggregate.

9 October 1988

Gabon	3 – 0	Burkina Faso
Minko 37', 85'

Stade Omar Bongo, Libreville
Referee: ... (Cameroon)
23 October 1988

Burkina Faso	1 – 0	Gabon
Gnimassou 29'

Stade du 4 Août, Ouagadougou
Referee: Issaka Diallo (Mali)

Gabon won 3–1 on aggregate.

Ethiopia	Cancelled	Uganda
		Withdrew

Ethiopia advanced after Uganda withdrew.

Guinea	Cancelled	Mauritania
		Withdrew

Guinea advanced after Mauritania withdrew.

Libya	Cancelled	Madagascar
		Withdrew

Libya advanced after Madagascar withdrew.

Mozambique	Cancelled	Gambia
		Withdrew

Mozambique advanced after Gambia withdrew.

=== First round ===
Team 1	Agg.	Team 2	1st leg	2nd leg
Sudan	1–1 (5–6 p)	Kenya	1–0	0–1
Ethiopia	2–6	Egypt	1-0	1–6
Guinea	1–4	Nigeria	1–1	0–3
Gabon	1–1 (5–3 p)	Ghana	1–0	0–1
Mali	1–1(a)	Morocco	0–0	1–1
Angola	1–6	Ivory Coast	0–2	1–4
Swaziland	1–3	Malawi	0–2	1–1
Mauritius	1–5	Zimbabwe	1–4	0–1
Mozambique	0–4	Zambia	0–1	0–3
Senegal	w/o	Togo	—	—
Tunisia	w/o	Libya	—	—
Zaire	w/o	Sierra Leone	—	—

7 April 1989

Sudan	1 – 0	Kenya

Khartoum Stadium, Khartoum
Referee: Mohamed Hossam Al-Din (Egypt)
23 April 1989

Kenya	1 – 0	Sudan
Dawo
Penalties
	6 – 5

Nyayo National Stadium, Nairobi

Kenya won 6–5 on penalty shootout after 1–1 on aggregate.

9 April 1989

Ethiopia	1 – 0	Egypt

Addis Ababa Stadium, Addis Ababa
Referee: William Ochieng (Kenya)
21 April 1989

Egypt	6 – 1	Ethiopia
Abdel-Hameed 5', 13', 48'; El-Kass 40'; Hassan 58', 75'		Goal

Cairo International Stadium, Cairo
Referee: Mohamed Abdelsalam Gasmalla (Sudan)

Egypt won 6–2 on aggregate.

9 April 1989

Guinea	1 – 1	Nigeria
Camara 30'		Balarabe 35'

Stade du 28 Septembre, Conakry
Referee: Hassan Chafaï (Morocco)
22 April 1989

Nigeria	3 – 0	Guinea
Ekpo; Adekola; Balarabe

Liberty Stadium, Ibadan
Referee: Idrissa Traoré (Mali)

Nigeria won 4–1 on aggregate.

9 April 1989

Gabon	1 – 0	Ghana

Stade Omar Bongo, Libreville
Referee: Laurent Petcha (Cameroon)
23 April 1989

Ghana	1 – 0	Gabon
Penalties
	3 – 5

Accra Sports Stadium, Accra
Referee: Selemani Tambwe (Burundi)

Gabon won 5–3 on penalty shootout after 1–1 on aggregate.

9 April 1989

Mali	0 – 0	Morocco

Bamako
Referee: Idrissa Sarr (Mauritania)
23 April 1989

Morocco	1 – 1	Mali
Nader 1'		M. Kouyaté 42'

Al harthi Stadium, Marrakesh
Referee: Naji Jouini (Tunisia)

Mali won after 1–1 on aggregate by away goals.

9 April 1989

Angola	0 – 2	Ivory Coast

Luanda
Referee: Gaston Engoua (Congo)
23 April 1989

Ivory Coast	4 – 1	Angola
Bamba; Traoré (pen.); Amani		Ralph (pen.)

Stade Félix Houphouët-Boigny, Abidjan
Referee: Louis Laryea (Ghana)

Ivory Coast won 6–1 on aggregate.

9 April 1989

Swaziland	0 – 2	Malawi
		Sinalo 12'; Kayira 20'

Mbabane
Referee: John Nkathazo (Zimbabwe)
23 April 1989

Malawi	1 – 1	Swaziland
Kayira		Goal

Kamuzu Stadium, Blantyre
Referee: Joel Mondoka (Zambia)

Malawi won 3–1 on aggregate.

9 April 1989

Mauritius	1 – 4	Zimbabwe
Gunesh 35' (pen.)		Ndunduma 15'; F. Phiri 27'; Mwanza 40'; J. Phiri 87'

Curepipe
Referee: Ali Tahir Hafidh (Tanzania)
23 April 1989

Zimbabwe	1 – 0	Mauritius

National Sports Stadium, Harare
Referee: Jimmy Kagere (Rwanda)

Zimbabwe won 5–1 on aggregate.

16 April 1989

Mozambique	0 – 1	Zambia

Estádio da Machava, Maputo
Referee: Eganaden Cadressen (Mauritius)
30 April 1989

Zambia	3 – 0	Mozambique
Malitoli

Lusaka
Referee: Charles Masembe (Uganda)

Zambia won 4–0 on aggregate.

Senegal	Cancelled	Togo
		Withdrew

Senegal advanced after Togo withdrew.

Tunisia	Cancelled	Libya
		Withdrew

Tunisia advanced after Libya withdrew.

Zaire	Cancelled	Sierra Leone
		Withdrew

Zaire advanced after Sierra Leone withdrew.

=== Second round ===
Team 1	Agg.	Team 2	1st leg	2nd leg
Senegal	4–0	Tunisia	3–0	1–0
Malawi	2–3	Kenya	2–3	0–0
Egypt	2–0	Zaire	2–0	0–0
Nigeria	4–1	Zimbabwe	3–0	1–1
Mali	3–5	Ivory Coast	2–2	1–3
Zambia	4–2	Gabon	3–0	1–2

2 July 1989

Senegal	3 – 0	Tunisia
Bocandé 48', 77'; N'Diaye 53'

Stade Léopold Sédar Senghor, Dakar
Referee: Abderrahmane Bergui (Algeria)
16 July 1989

Tunisia	0 – 1	Senegal
		Youm 88'

Marrakesh Stadium, Marrakesh
Referee: Drissa Traoré (Mali)

Senegal won 4–1 on aggregate.

16 July 1989

Malawi	2 – 3	Kenya
Chirwa 75'; Chimodzi 78'		Chimodzi 5' (o.g.); Otieno 9'; Ndolo 85'

Kamuzu Stadium, Blantyre
29 July 1989

Kenya	0 – 0	Malawi

Nyayo National Stadium, Nairobi
Referee: Mohamed Hafez (Egypt)

Kenya won 3–2 on aggregate.

16 July 1989

Egypt	2 – 0	Zaire
Hassan 57'; Shawky 67'

Cairo International Stadium, Cairo
Referee: Abdelali Naciri (Morocco)
30 July 1989

Zaire	0 – 0	Egypt

Stade du 20-Mai, Kinshasa
Referee: Badou Jasseh (Gambia)

Egypt won 2–0 on aggregate.

16 July 1989

Nigeria	3 – 0	Zimbabwe
Esin 30'; Murehwa 34' (o.g.); Nwosu 46'

Liberty Stadium, Ibadan
Referee: Badara Sène (Senegal)
30 July 1989

Zimbabwe	1 – 1	Nigeria
Ekpo 21' (o.g.)		Agada 89'

National Sports Stadium, Harare
Referee: Joel Mondoka (Zambia)

Nigeria won 4–1 on aggregate.

16 July 1989

Mali	2 – 2	Ivory Coast
Sanogo 44'; Samaké 66'		Traoré 26'; Yaohua 56'

Bamako
Referee: Ali Bin Nasser (Tunisia)
30 July 1989

Ivory Coast	3 – 1	Mali
Traoré 37', 52'; Amani 85'		Cissé 86'

Stade Félix Houphouët-Boigny, Abidjan
Referee: Gaston Engoua (Congo)

Ivory Coast won 5–3 on aggregate.

16 July 1989

Zambia	3 – 0	Gabon
Malitoli; Makinka

Lusaka
Referee: Bekele Kidane (Ethiopia)
30 July 1989

Gabon	2 – 1	Zambia
Minko 15'; Amégasse 43'		Chansa 7'

Stade Omar Bongo, Libreville
Referee: Idrissa Sarr (Mauritania)

Zambia won 4–2 on aggregate.

== Qualified teams ==
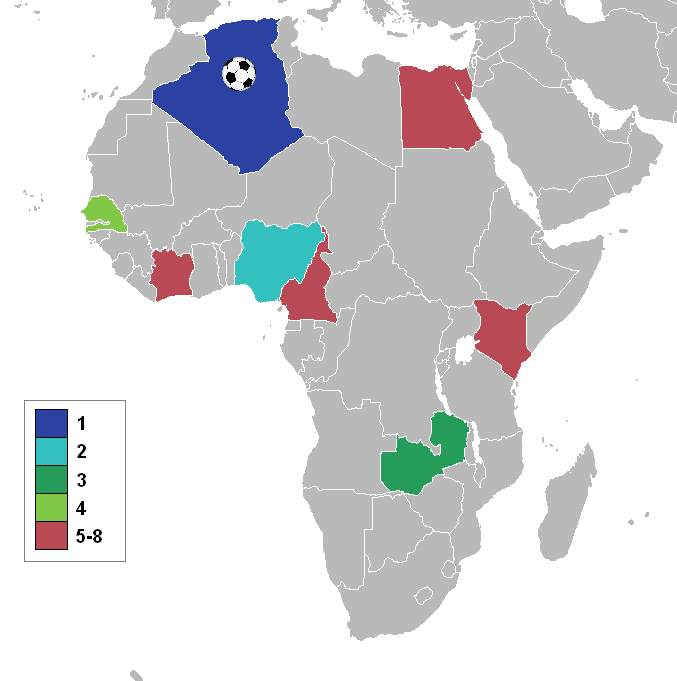
Participating nations

- Algeria (hosts)
- Cameroon (holders)
- Egypt
- Ivory Coast
- Kenya
- Nigeria
- Senegal
- Zambia
