= Algeria–Egypt football rivalry =

International football rivalry

- Location: CAF (Africa); UNAF (North Africa)
- Teams: Algeria; Egypt
- First meeting: Algeria 1–1 Egypt; Friendly; 5 July 1963
- Latest meeting: Egypt 1–1 Algeria; Friendly; 16 October 2023

Statistics
- Total meetings: 29
- Most wins: Algeria (10)
- All-time series: Algeria: 10; Draw: 12; Egypt: 7

The Algeria–Egypt football rivalry is a football rivalry between the national football teams of Algeria and Egypt, having achieved nine Africa Cup of Nations and two Arab Cups between the two countries. The two nations have played 29 games against each other; Algeria leads in wins with 11 to Egypt's 7 with the two sides drawing 12 times.

After the independence of Algeria, the first official match took place on 5 July 1963, in a friendly match at the 20 August 1955 Stadium in Algiers. The two teams' matches in the 2010 FIFA World Cup qualification remain a turning point in the history of the rivalry between the two countries. The two countries also have rivalries with Tunisia.

== Background ==
Egypt is the first African and Arab country to participate in a FIFA World Cup in 1934, it also participated in the 1990 and 2018 editions. Algeria, for its part, has participated four times in the biggest football event in the world: 1982, 1986, 2010 and 2014. The two have qualified together to the World Cup for the first time in 2026.

Year	Algeria		Egypt	
Year	Qualification	Round	Qualification	Round
(Italy) 1934	Part of France	—N/a	Qualified – Group 12 winner	First round
(Spain) 1982	Qualified – Final round winner	Group stage	Did not qualify – Third round loser	—N/a
(Mexico) 1986	Qualified – Final round winner	Group stage	Did not qualify – Third round loser	—N/a
(Italy) 1990	Did not qualify – Final round loser	—N/a	Qualified – Final round winner	Group stage
(South Africa) 2010	Qualified – Tiebreaking play-off winner	Group stage	Did not qualify – Tiebreaking play-off loser	—N/a
(Brazil) 2014	Qualified – Third round winner	Round of 16	Did not qualify – Third round loser	—N/a
(Russia) 2018	Did not qualify – Third round loser	—N/a	Qualified – Third round winner	Group stage
(Canada) (Mexico) (United States) 2026	Qualified – CAF Group G winner	TBD	Qualified – CAF Group A winner	TBD

== History ==
The rivalry between the two countries could take root in the tour of the Algerian FLN football team in the Middle East in 1958. In solidarity with the Algerian cause, the countries of the Eastern bloc and the Arab countries defied the FIFA ban on playing with this clandestine team. However, the Egyptian authorities, anxious not to offend FIFA in a delicate context with the creation in 1957 of the Confederation of African Football in Cairo, refused to play exhibition matches. The generation of the FLN team remains marked by this episode. After the independence of Algeria, the two countries never met in the World Cup. Algeria participated in the 1982, 1986, 2010 and 2014 editions and Egypt in the 1934, 1990 and 2018 editions. However, the two nations met in the qualification of the 1990, 2002 and 2010; all three times in high-stakes matches with qualification for the winner.

For the 1990 FIFA World Cup qualification, Algeria finished first in Group A undefeated and Egypt finished first in Group B. A final round was organized between the four group winners to determine the two nations participating in the World Cup. On 8 October 1989, the Egyptian team drew 0–0 in Algeria in the first leg and then won 1–0 in Cairo on 17 November 1989. The nation therefore qualified for the competition along with Cameroon, the winner against Tunisia. Egypt's qualification was marred by clashes that began with a hostile reception upon the arrival of the Algerian delegation in Cairo and continued throughout its stay until its departure. But what made headlines was the accusation brought against the playmaker of the Algerian team at the time, Lakhdar Belloumi, accused of having seriously injured the eye of an Egyptian supporter present at the hotel hosting the Algerian team after the match, following a fight between the Algerian delegation and Egyptian supporters who came to the hotel. The Algerian authorities then accused Egypt of having set up the Algerian team and its star Belloumi, who was used as a scapegoat to distract from the hostile events that the Algerian team suffered during its stay in Egypt. Belloumi was convicted and prosecuted for many years by the Egyptian justice system, and pursued by Interpol until 2009 when he was cleared of this affair because he was innocent.

In 2001, Algeria, eliminated from the race for the 2002 FIFA World Cup qualification, played the last match of the qualifiers against Egypt in Annaba. In the first leg, the Egyptians crushed the Algerians 5–2 in Cairo. This historic victory put Egypt on the right track. It was celebrated by the Egyptians as the greatest success against the Maghreb rivals who at that time lost all chance of qualifying. The return match therefore promised to be decisive for the Pharaohs, in competition with Senegal. The Algerians, team and supporters, showed fierce determination to prevent the Pharaohs from qualifying. The score of 1-1 was celebrated in general jubilation. Incidents during the match and after were reported. Images of the bus being stoned were also shown on Egyptian television. In the other match played simultaneously in Windhoek, Senegal blew Namibia away 5–0. Senegal qualified.

During the 2010 FIFA World Cup qualification, the Algerian team bus was stoned by Egyptian supporters. The situation was tense because it was the last match of the qualifiers and each of the two teams had the possibility of qualifying. After Egypt's victory by 2–0, the two teams had to play a play-off match in Sudan, because they were perfectly equal (points, goal difference, goals for and goals against). Algeria won 1-0 and qualified for the 2010 FIFA World Cup. Two months later, the two teams met in the semi-finals of the 2010 Africa Cup of Nations.

== List of matches ==
#	Date	Location	Home Team	Score	Away team	Competition	Ref
1	5 July 1963	Algiers, Algeria	Algeria	1–1	(United Arab Republic) UAR	Friendly	
2	7 July 1963	Oran, Algeria	Algeria	2–2	(United Arab Republic) UAR	Friendly	
3	20 March 1964	(United Arab Republic) Cairo, UAR	UAR (United Arab Republic)	1–0	Algeria	Friendly	
4	22 March 1964	(United Arab Republic) Alexandria, UAR	UAR (United Arab Republic)	2–2	Algeria	Friendly	
5	19 September 1969	(United Arab Republic) Cairo, UAR	UAR (United Arab Republic)	1–0	Algeria	1970 African Cup of Nations qualification	
6	28 September 1969	Algiers, Algeria	Algeria	1–1	(United Arab Republic) UAR	1970 African Cup of Nations qualification	
7	29 August 1975	Algiers, Algeria	Algeria	1–0	Egypt	1975 Mediterranean Games	
8	4 January 1976	Riyadh, Saudi Arabia	Egypt	0–1	Algeria	Friendly	
9	13 July 1978	Algiers, Algeria	Algeria	1–1	Egypt	1978 All–Africa Games	
10	19 March 1980	Ibadan, Nigeria	Algeria	2–2 (4–2 p)	Egypt	1980 African Cup of Nations	
11	6 January 1984	Algiers, Algeria	Algeria	1–1	Egypt	1984 Summer Olympics qualification	
12	17 February 1984	Cairo, Egypt	Egypt	1–0	Algeria	1984 Summer Olympics qualification	
13	17 March 1984	Abidjan, Ivory Coast	Algeria	3–1	Egypt	1984 African Cup of Nations	
14	8 October 1989	Constantine, Algeria	Algeria	0–0	Egypt	1990 FIFA World Cup qualification	
15	17 November 1989	Cairo, Egypt	Egypt	1–0	Algeria	1990 FIFA World Cup qualification	
16	8 March 1990	Algiers, Algeria	Algeria	2–0	Egypt	1990 African Cup of Nations	
17	8 January 1995	Algiers, Algeria	Algeria	1–0	Egypt	1996 African Cup of Nations qualification	
18	14 July 1995	Cairo, Egypt	Egypt	1–1	Algeria	1996 African Cup of Nations qualification	
19	20 December 1997	Aswan, Egypt	Egypt	1–2	Algeria	Friendly	
20	24 December 1997	Cairo, Egypt	Egypt	1–2	Algeria	Friendly	
21	11 March 2001	Cairo, Egypt	Egypt	5–2	Algeria	2002 FIFA World Cup qualification	
22	21 July 2001	Annaba, Algeria	Algeria	1–1	Egypt	2002 FIFA World Cup qualification	
23	29 January 2004	Sousse, Tunisia	Algeria	2–1	Egypt	2004 African Cup of Nations	
24	7 June 2009	Blida, Algeria	Algeria	3–1	Egypt	2010 FIFA World Cup qualification	
25	14 November 2009	Cairo, Egypt	Egypt	2–0	Algeria	2010 FIFA World Cup qualification	
26	18 November 2009	Omdurman, Sudan	Egypt	0–1	Algeria	2010 FIFA World Cup qualification	
27	28 January 2010	Benguela, Angola	Algeria	0–4	Egypt	2010 Africa Cup of Nations	
28	7 December 2021	Al Wakrah, Qatar	Algeria	1–1	Egypt	2021 FIFA Arab Cup	
29	16 October 2023	(United Arab Emirates) Al Ain, UAE	Egypt	1–1	Algeria	Friendly	

== Major encounters ==
1975 Mediterranean Games

29 August 1975

Algeria B	1–0	Egypt
Draoui 85'

Stade 5 Juillet 1962, Algiers
Attendance: 40,000
Referee: ? (Tunisia)

1980 African Cup of Nations

19 March 1980

Algeria	2–2	Egypt
Assad 55' (pen.); Benmiloudi 62'	Report	El Khatib 32'; El Sayed 47'
Penalties
Belloumi (penalty scored); Fergani (penalty scored); Khedis (penalty scored); Larbès (penalty missed); Assad (penalty scored)	4–2	(penalty scored) Shehata; (penalty scored) Mokhtar; (penalty missed) El Khatib; (penalty missed) Amer

Liberty Stadium, Ibadan
Attendance: 5,000
Referee: Théophile Lawson-Hétchéli (Togo)

1984 African Cup of Nations

17 March 1984

Algeria	3–1	Egypt
Madjer 68'; Belloumi 71'; Yahi 90'	Report	Abdelghani 76' (pen.)

Stade Félix Houphouët-Boigny, Abidjan
Attendance: 500
Referee: Mohammed Larache (Morocco)

1990 African Cup of Nations

8 March 1990

Algeria	2–0	Egypt
Amani 39'; Saïb 43'	Report

Stade 5 Juillet 1962, Algiers
Attendance: 86,000
Referee: Eganaden Cadressen (Mauritius)

2004 African Cup of Nations

29 January 2004
19:00

Algeria	2–1	Egypt
Mamouni 13'; Achiou 86'	Report	Belal 25'

Sousse Olympic Stadium, Sousse
Attendance: 15,000
Referee: Alain Hamer (Luxembourg)

2010 Africa Cup of Nations

28 January 2010
20:30

Algeria	0–4	Egypt
	Report	Abd Rabo 38' (pen.); Zidan 65'; Abdel-Shafy 80'; Gedo 90+2'

Complexo da Sr. da Graça, Benguela
Attendance: 30,000
Referee: Coffi Codjia (Benin)

2021 FIFA Arab Cup

7 December 2021
22:00

Algeria	1–1	Egypt
Tougai 20'	Report	El Solia 60' (pen.)

Al Janoub Stadium, Al Wakrah
Attendance: 32,418
Referee: Facundo Tello (Argentina)

== See also ==
- 2009 Algeria v Egypt football matches
- Algeria–Egypt relations
