= 1990 FIFA World Cup qualification (CAF) =

Tournament statistics
- Top scorer: (Cameroon) François Omam-Biyik (4 goals)

The Confederation of African Football (CAF) section of the 1990 FIFA World Cup qualification saw teams competing for two berths in the final tournament in Italy.

26 nations in total entered the qualifying stage. FIFA rejected the entries of Mauritius and Mozambique due to their outstanding debts, leaving 24 nations to contest the qualifying spots. Lesotho, Rwanda and Togo withdrew after the draw for the first round, which took place on 12 December 1987, but before playing a match. Libya won their first round tie and advanced to the second round, but withdrew halfway through that stage, meaning all their results in the group were annulled.

== Format ==
- First Round: Algeria, Cameroon, Ivory Coast, Egypt, Kenya, Morocco, Nigeria and Zaire, the eight best ranked teams according to FIFA, received byes and advanced to the Second Round directly. The remaining sixteen teams were paired up to play knockout matches on a home-and-away basis. The winners would advance to the Second Round.
- Second Round: The eight winners from the first round were joined by the eight seeded teams and divided into four groups of four teams each. The teams would play against each other on a home-and-away basis. The group winners would advance to the Final Round.
- Final Round: The four remaining teams were paired up to play knockout matches on a home-and-away basis. The winners would qualify.

== First round ==
Eight knockout (two-legged) ties were originally required, involving the sixteen lowest ranked African countries. The withdrawals of three teams meant only five ties were actually contested. The eight successful teams advanced to the group format of the second round.

Team 1	Agg.	Team 2	1st leg	2nd leg
Angola	2–1	Sudan	0–0	2–1
Zimbabwe	w/o	Lesotho	–	–
Zambia	w/o	Rwanda	–	–
Uganda	2–3	Malawi	1–0	1–3
Libya	3–2	Burkina Faso	3–0	0–2
Ghana	0–2	Liberia	0–0	0–2
Tunisia	5–3	Guinea	5–0	0–3
Gabon	w/o	Togo	–	–
Algeria	bye			
Cameroon	bye			
Egypt	bye			
Ivory Coast	bye			
Kenya	bye			
Morocco	bye			
Nigeria	bye			
Zaire	bye			

== Second round ==
The eight qualifiers from the first round were joined by the eight highest-ranked CAF teams. The teams were split into four groups of four which played a home-and-away round-robin, with the four group winners advancing to the final round.

Legend
Countries that advanced to the final round

=== Group A ===
	Pld	W	D	L	GF	GA	GD	Pts
Algeria	4	3	1	0	6	1	+5	7
Ivory Coast	4	1	2	1	5	1	+4	4
Zimbabwe	4	0	1	3	1	10	−9	1
Libya	Withdrew after one match							

	(Algeria)	(Ivory Coast)	(Zimbabwe)
Algeria	–	1–0	3–0
Ivory Coast	0–0	–	5–0
Zimbabwe	1–2	0–0	–

Libya played one match in this group before withdrawing from the competition, annulling their results.

=== Group B ===
	Pld	W	D	L	GF	GA	GD	Pts
Egypt	6	3	2	1	6	2	+4	8
Liberia	6	2	2	2	2	3	−1	6
Malawi	6	1	3	2	3	4	−1	5
Kenya	6	1	3	2	2	4	−2	5

	(Egypt)	(Kenya)	(Liberia)	(Malawi)
Egypt	–	2–0	2–0	1–0
Kenya	0–0	–	1–0	1–1
Liberia	1–0	0–0	–	1–0
Malawi	1–1	1–0	0–0	–

=== Group C ===
	Pld	W	D	L	GF	GA	GD	Pts
Cameroon	6	4	1	1	9	6	+3	9
Nigeria	6	3	1	2	7	5	+2	7
Angola	6	1	2	3	6	7	−1	4
Gabon	6	2	0	4	5	9	−4	4

	(Cameroon)	(Nigeria)	(Angola)	(Gabon)
Cameroon	–	1–0	1–1	2–1
Nigeria	2–0	–	1–0	1–0
Angola	1–2	2–2	–	2–0
Gabon	1–3	2–1	1–0	–

=== Group D ===
	Pld	W	D	L	GF	GA	GD	Pts
Tunisia	6	3	1	2	5	5	0	7
Zambia	6	3	0	3	7	6	+1	6
Zaire	6	2	2	2	7	7	0	6
Morocco	6	1	3	2	4	5	−1	5

	(Tunisia)	(Zambia)	(Zaire)	(Morocco)
Tunisia	–	1–0	1–0	2–1
Zambia	1–0	–	4–2	2–1
Zaire	3–1	1–0	–	0–0
Morocco	0–0	1–0	1–1	–

== Final round ==
Team 1	Agg.	Team 2	1st leg	2nd leg
Algeria	0–1	Egypt	0–0	0–1
Cameroon	3–0	Tunisia	2–0	1–0

The four group winners from the second round were drawn into two ties. The winner of each two-legged tie qualified for the 1990 FIFA World Cup.

8 October 1989

Algeria	0–0	Egypt

Stade 17 Juin, Constantine
Attendance: 55,000
Referee: Edwin Picon-Ackong (Mauritius)
17 November 1989

Egypt	1–0	Algeria
H. Hassan 4'

Cairo Stadium, Cairo
Attendance: 100,000
Referee: Ali Bin Nasser (Tunisia)

Egypt won 1–0 on aggregate and qualified for the 1990 World Cup.

8 October 1989

Cameroon	2–0	Tunisia
Mfédé 54'; Kundé 90+1'

Stade Omnisports, Yaoundé
Attendance: 80,000
Referee: Abdelali Naciri (Morocco)
19 November 1989

Tunisia	0–1	Cameroon
		Omam-Biyik 14'

Stade El Menzah, Tunis
Attendance: 45,000
Referee: Badara Sène (Senegal)

Cameroon won 3–0 on aggregate and qualified for the 1990 World Cup.

== Qualified teams ==
Team	Qualified as	Qualified on	Previous appearances in FIFA World Cup^{1}
Egypt	final round winners	17 November 1989	1 (1934)
Cameroon	final round winners	19 November 1989	1 (1982)

^{1} Bold indicates champions for that year. Italic indicates hosts for that year.

== Goalscorers ==
4 goals

- (Cameroon) François Omam-Biyik

3 goals

- (Algeria) Rabah Madjer
- (Algeria) Djamel Menad
- (Cameroon) André Kana-Biyik
- (Egypt) Abdel Rasoul Hesham
- (Malawi) Peterkins Kayira
- (Nigeria) Stephen Keshi
- (Tunisia) Jameleddine Limam
- (Zaire) Eugène Kabongo

2 goals

- (Angola) José Vieira Dias
- (Angola) Joseph Maluka
- (Cameroon) Émile Mbouh
- (Guinea) Abdoulaye Emmerson
- (Ivory Coast) Oumar Ben Salah
- (Liberia) James Debbah
- (Liberia) George Weah
- (Nigeria) Samson Siasia
- (Tunisia) Nabil Maâloul
- (Uganda) Sundayin Moriri
- (Zaire) N'Kiambi Mapuata
- (Zambia) Kalusha Bwalya
- (Zambia) Derby Makinka

1 goal

- (Angola) Mavango Kiala
- (Angola) Osvaldo de Oliveira
- (Angola) Paulão
- (Angola) Manuel Saavedra
- (Burkina Faso) Gabriel Gnimassou
- (Burkina Faso) Jules Kadeba
- (Cameroon) Bonaventure Djonkep
- (Cameroon) Emmanuel Kundé
- (Cameroon) Louis-Paul Mfédé
- (Egypt) Mohamed Ala'a
- (Egypt) Mohamed El-Akad
- (Egypt) Hossam Hassan
- (Egypt) Ibrahim Hassan
- (Gabon) Régis Manon
- (Gabon) Michel Minico
- (Gabon) Joel Minko
- (Gabon) Guy-Roger Nzamba
- (Gabon) Nicaise Ondeno
- (Guinea) Camara Toure
- (Kenya) Peter Dawo
- (Kenya) George Onyango
- (Ivory Coast) Jean-Pierre Guede Akenon
- (Ivory Coast) Yao Lambert Amani
- (Ivory Coast) Sékou Bamba
- (Libya) Ezzewdin Bezan
- (Libya) Fawzi El-Aisawi
- (Libya) Ayad El-Ghadi
- (Malawi) Gilbert Chirwa
- (Malawi) Singo McDonald
- (Malawi) Lawrence Waya
- (Morocco) Aziz Bouderbala
- (Morocco) Mohamed Madih
- (Morocco) Abdelfettah Rhiati
- (Morocco) Mohammed Timoumi
- (Nigeria) Michael Obiku
- (Nigeria) Wole Odegbami
- (Sudan) Osama Idriss
- (Tunisia) Lasaad Abdelli
- (Tunisia) Tarak Dhiab
- (Tunisia) Bassam Jeridi
- (Tunisia) Mohamed Ali Mahjoubi
- (Tunisia) Kais Yâakoubi
- (Zaire) Kuyangana Makukula
- (Zaire) Nkiere Wawa
- (Zambia) Lucky Msiska
- (Zambia) Charly Musonda
- (Zambia) Witson Nyirenda
- (Zimbabwe) Stanley Ndunduma
