= Balaraba =

Given name

- Pronunciation: b(a)-lara-ba or bal(a)-raba
- Gender: Female
- Language: Hausa/Arabic

Origin
- Language: Hausa
- Origin: Nigeria
- Derivation: Wednesday
- Meaning: A daughter born on Wednesday

Other names
- Nickname: Lara Balarabiya
- Related names: Bala Balarabe Rabe Laraba

Balaraba is a feminine name of Hausa origin, which is used in Nigeria.

One meaning of the name is 'beautiful princess' or 'queen'. In Hausa, the name can be given to a girl born on Wednesday, derived from Laraba "Wednesday" (from Arabic الأربعاء (al-ʾarbiʿāʾ), in turn from أربعة (ʾarbaʿa) meaning "four"). The male name is "Balarabe".

Notable people with the name include:

== Given name ==
- Balaraba Aliyu Inuwa, Nigerian commissioner
- Balaraba Ramat Yakubu (born 1959), Nigerian author
