= Balarabe =

Surnames

- Gender: Male
- Language: Hausa

Origin
- Origin: Nigerian
- Meaning: Son of the prophet, or descendant of the prophet.
- Region of origin: Northern, Nigeria

Balarabe is a Nigerian male given name and surname predominantly used among Muslims, particularly within the Hausa community. It means "Son of the prophet, descendant of the prophet". The name Balarabe is of Arabic origin, derived from the Arabic words 'bal' meaning 'son' and 'rabi' meaning 'prophet', specifically referring to the Prophet Muhammad.

== Notable individuals with the name ==
- Kande Balarabe, Nigerian politician.
- Sadik Balarabe (born 1992), Nigerian international footballer.
- Abubakar Balarabe (born 1968), Nigerian international footballer.
- Hadiza Sabuwa Balarabe (born 1966), Nigerian politician.
- Abdulkadir Balarabe Musa (1936 – 2020), Nigerian politician.
- Abdullahi Balarabe Salame (born 1955), Nigerian Senior Advocate.
- Mohammed Balarabe Haladu (1944 – 1998) Nigerian army officer.
- Ibrahim Balarabe-Abdullahi, Nigerian politician
