= 2009 Algeria v Egypt football matches =

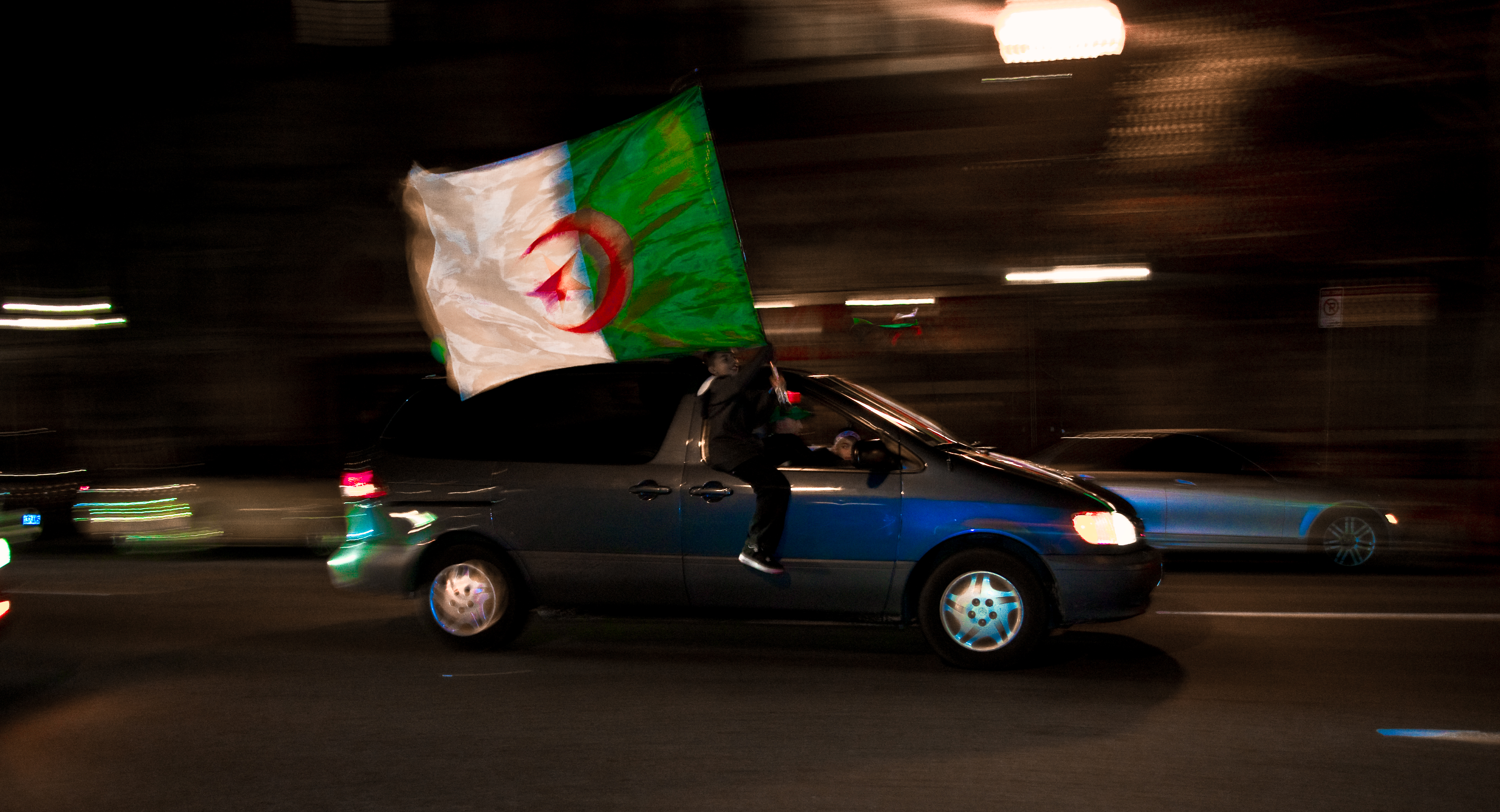
- Algerian celebrations in the city of Boston
- Event: 2010 FIFA World Cup qualification Tiebreaking play-off
Egypt	Algeria
(Egypt)	(Algeria)
0	1
- Algeria qualified to the 2010 FIFA World Cup and the 2010 African Cup of Nations
- Date: 18 November 2009
- Venue: Al Merreikh Stadium, Omdurman
- Man of the Match: Antar Yahia (Algeria)
- Referee: Eddy Maillet (Seychelles)
- Attendance: 35,000

There were disturbances before and after two international association football matches between Egypt and Algeria in November 2009, leading to diplomatic tensions between Egypt, Algeria, and Sudan. The matches were in Group C in the CAF section of the qualifying competition for the 2010 FIFA World Cup and the 2010 African Cup of Nations

The first match, the final scheduled match in Group C, took place in Cairo on 14 November, with Egypt winning 2–0. The result left Egypt and Algeria tied for first place in Group C, meaning they would both qualify for the African Cup of Nations held in Angola during January 2010, but necessitating a playoff match in a neutral country to decide who qualified for the 2010 World Cup hosted by South Africa. This took place in Omdurman, Sudan on 18 November, with Algeria winning 1–0 and thus qualifying for the World Cup.

== Rivalry ==
The countries are both in North Africa, separated by Libya and Tunisia, and football matches between them are fiercely contested local derbies. Although both have long been among Africa's stronger sides, each had experienced a long drought without World Cup qualification: Algeria since 1986 and Egypt since 1990.

In 1989, Egypt beat Algeria in a decisive qualifying match for the 1990 World Cup. Player Ayman Younes later said, "It was a battle, not a football match." Algerians felt the Tunisian referee was biased; fans rioted in the stands. An Algerian player attacked an Egyptian fan. Algeria's Lakhdar Belloumi was convicted in absentia for a glass attack which blinded Egypt's team doctor in one eye. He remained subject to an Interpol arrest warrant, although he claimed goalkeeper Kamel Kadri had been the true perpetrator.

Khaled Diab suggests that the 1989 match was the key moment for Egypt–Algeria rivalry, and that it is mainly confined to football rather than a reflection of deeper enmity; he notes Gamal Abdel Nasser supported Algeria's independence war against France, and suggests memory has faded in Algeria of Anwar El Sadat's unpopular Camp David Accords with Israel. On the other hand, Brian Oliver and James Montague point to other football controversies before 1989. In the 1950s, an Algerian National Liberation Front football team toured Africa to publicise its independence campaign, but were forbidden from playing in Egypt. At the 1978 All-Africa Games, Algerian police attacked Egyptian players and fans during their match against Libya. There were brawls at a qualifier for the 1984 Olympics.

== Blida match ==
Algeria's home match against Egypt in the 2010 qualifiers took place in June 2009 without any incident being reported. Rather, to cool down animosity between the two countries, the Egyptian team was received with flowers at the airport. Diplomatic agreement, with personal intervention from Algerian president Abdelaziz Bouteflika, included lifting the Interpol warrant on Belloumi and compensating the Egyptian team doctor. Both teams prepared for the match away from the pressure of intense local fans; Egypt in Oman, Algeria in France. Algeria coach Rabah Saadane wept at a press conference, expressing fear for his family's safety in the event of defeat. 5,000 security personnel turned Blida into a "virtual military base". Minors were barred from the stadium unless they had a ticket. Algeria won 3–1.

7 June 2009
20:30 UTC+1

Algeria	3–1	Egypt
Matmour 60'; Ghezzal 64'; Djebbour 77'	Report	Aboutrika 86'

Stade Mustapha Tchaker, Blida
Attendance: 26,500
Referee: Daniel Bennett (South Africa)

== Cairo match ==
The lead-up to the crucial match was hyped. In October, insults were traded on internet sites, and Egyptian hackers made a denial-of-service attack on the website of Algerian newspaper Ech-Chorouk El-Youmi; an Algerian hacker retaliated by crashing the websites of the President of Egypt and Egyptian newspaper Al Ahram. Both countries' governments appealed for calm. Media in both countries alluded to the 1989 match. Editorialist Mohamed El Dahshan reported, "In the two days preceding the game, Egyptians celebrated as if they had already won." Ahmed Shobair stated that rumours started on the internet were being propagated by the mainstream media.

When the Algerian team arrived in Cairo on Thursday 12 November, the bus carrying the team to its hotel was stoned, breaking windows and injuring three players and one official. Egyptian media alleged that the attack had been staged by the Algerians to have the match moved to a neutral venue. The police escort of one van and several motorcycle outriders was criticised as insufficient.

Egypt's leading state-owned daily Al-Ahram charged on Friday that it was the Algerian players, not stonethrowers, who had caused the damage to the bus. "The bus carrying the team from the airport to the hotel was at the centre of a strange incident in which some of the players started to smash the vehicle's windows claiming that they were the target of stonethrowing", the paper reported. The independent daily Al-Shuruq went further, saying the whole episode was a "complete fabrication." Citing a "senior security source", the paper said the windows of the bus were smashed "from the inside not the outside as claimed by Algerian team members." It accused the players of a "complete fabrication intended to serve as an excuse in the event that they lose" Saturday's key decider for next year's World Cup finals in South Africa.

The independent Al-Masry Al-Youm newspaper acknowledged that some "kids" had thrown stones but charged that the Algerian players had then put on a "display of histrionics pretending to be scared and injured, and smashing up the bus's windows and seats." The state-owned Al Gomhuria said the players had even assaulted the bus driver.

Counterclaims included footage shot by Canal+ for its documentary about the Algerian team and cellphone footage shot by Rafik Saïfi. FIFA observer Walter Gagg said, "We saw that three players had been injured — Khaled Lemmouchia on the head, Rafik Halliche above the eye and Rafik Saïfi on the arm."

The initial reporting following the incident likely led to further poisoning the build-up to Saturday's game. The pre-match atmosphere in Egypt had already surged to feverish heights amid an unprecedented level of tension between the North African rivals.

Egyptian foreign ministry spokesman Hossam Zaki had specifically called for responsible coverage by both countries' media as the two governments issued joint appeals for calm. Egyptian and Algerian media "hold a responsibility in this regard and must work to maintain the strong ties between both countries and should not fuel disagreements that are unrelated to sports and sportsmanship", Zaki said.

That same evening just outside Cairo, Algeria's "king of raï" Cheb Khaled performed alongside Egyptian star Mohamed Mounir to a packed audience of nearly 45,000 people, according to organisers. "Long live Egypt, Arab country, long live Algeria, Arab country", Cheb Khaled shouted to the crowd with little apparent impact on home fans ahead of the game.

Egyptian Football Association board member Mahmoud Taher later indicated that "all Algeria players are safe. They were not hurt. Algeria is trying to blow things out of proportion. The bus is damaged from inside, so it is obvious that they were the ones who did that to escalate the matter. FIFA has not contacted Egypt as recently reported, and there aren't any intentions to call off the game."

Khairi Morsi, the Egyptian driver who drove the Algerian delegation's bus, said the Algerian team had assaulted him. He indicated to Modern Sport TV that "they also shattered the windows from inside when they saw some Egyptian people around the bus."

On Friday 13 November, FIFA declared the match would go ahead as scheduled, but "asked the Egyptian Football Association and the highest national authorities through the relevant ministries to provide written guarantees that confirm the implementation of the necessary additional safety and security measures at any time for the Algerian delegation."

14 November 2009
19:30 UTC+2

Egypt	2–0	Algeria
Zaki 3'; Moteab 90+5'	Report

Cairo International Stadium, Cairo
Attendance: 75,000
Referee: Jerome Damon (South Africa)

Ech-Chorouk reported that six Algerian fans were killed in the chaos that followed the match. This was denied by Algeria's ambassador in Cairo, Abdel Qader Hadjar, who said only eleven people had been injured. Egypt's Health Ministry reported 20 Algerians and 12 Egyptians injured. Reda City 16, a well-known Algerian rapper, claimed his brother had died in the Cairo incidents. His claims, made on a YouTube video posting, were disseminated by the Ech-Chorouk newspaper's internet site.

There were attacks on Egyptian interests in Algeria after the match. EgyptAir's Algiers bureau was broken into and a "serious" amount of damage done and the office was closed due to health and safety concerns. Stones were hurled at other buildings. The headquarters of Djezzy, an Algerian subsidiary of the Egyptian Orascom group, was vandalised and looted. Allegedly related was the Algerian government's demand from Orascom for US$596m in back taxes. An Egyptian plane sent to Algeria to "rescue" citizens was refused permission to land.

In Marseille, 500 police were deployed to quell disturbances by Algerian youths, making eight arrests.

As a result of these events, on 18 May 2010, the FIFA Disciplinary Committee sanctioned and fined the Egyptian Football Association for not adopting the necessary measures to prevent the assault on the bus of the Algerian delegation on the way from the airport to the hotel on 12 November 2009. The report would also admonish the Egyptian Football Association for failures in maintaining security and order in the Cairo International Stadium for the game between Egypt and Algeria held on 14 November 2009. This would result in a two-game ban for the Egyptian national football team whereby the first two home matches of the preliminary competition for the 2014 FIFA World Cup in Brazil would be played at a location at least 100 kilometres away from Cairo.

Team	Pld	W	D	L	GF	GA	GD	Pts	Qualification	(Algeria)	(Egypt)	(Zambia)	(Rwanda)
Algeria	6	4	1	1	9	4	+5	13 (Note: Algeria and Egypt finished with identical overall and head-to-head records. Algeria won the tiebreaking play-off 1–0 to qualify for the 2010 FIFA World Cup.)	Qualified for the 2010 FIFA World Cup and 2010 Africa Cup of Nations	—	3–1	1–0	3–1
Egypt	6	4	1	1	9	4	+5	13	Qualified for the 2010 Africa Cup of Nations	2–0	—	1–1	3–0
Zambia	6	1	2	3	2	5	−3	5	Qualified for the 2010 Africa Cup of Nations	0–2	0–1	—	1–0
Rwanda	6	0	2	4	1	8	−7	2		0–0	0–1	0–0	—

Notes:
- Algeria, Egypt and Zambia qualified for the 2010 African Cup of Nations.

== Omdurman match ==
The teams finished level on 13 points and level on all tiebreakers: goal difference in all group matches (+5); goals scored in all group matches (9); points in all Algeria–Egypt matches (3); and goal difference in all Algeria–Egypt matches (0). (The away goals rule was not used as a group-stage tiebreaker). The teams met in a one-game play-off to decide the qualifier. To determine the match venue, each team selected a country other than their own (Algeria selected Tunisia and Egypt selected Sudan). After Sudan was drawn in a lottery on 11 November, the Al Merreikh Stadium in Omdurman was selected by FIFA as the venue for the play-off. The decision to play a tie-breaking playoff game to determine who qualifies to the 2010 FIFA World Cup was controversial because despite the fact that Algeria and Egypt were level on all tiebreakers listed above, Egypt would have qualified based on the away goals rule, which was used to determine the winner of a tie in the case of a tiebreaker in both previous and subsequent qualifiers.

Reuters reported that 15,000 police were mobilised for the match. Embassies advised their nationals to avoid the stadium area; government offices and schools closed early. Scuffles leading to minor injuries were reported.

On Monday 16 November, Al Jazeera reported that Algerian fans had stoned a bus carrying the Egyptian players from a training session, without causing injury. The following day, Sudan President Omar al-Bashir hosted a function in the Presidential Palace in Khartoum, in which Algerian Football Federation head Mohamed Raouraoua snubbed his Egyptian counterpart Samir Zaher.

Each team's fans were allocated 9,000 tickets, with the stadium capacity reduced from 41,000 to 36,000; there were fears of ticketless fans congregating outside. Although the countries' own blocks were strictly segregated, many Algerian and Egyptian fans purchased tickets allocated to the home Sudanese. Locals estimated the actual attendance at up to 50,000.

=== Details ===
18 November 2009
20:30 UTC+3

Egypt	0–1	Algeria
	Report	Yahia 40'

Al Merreikh Stadium, Omdurman (Sudan)
Attendance: 40,000
Referee: Eddy Maillet (Seychelles)

Egypt	Algeria

GK	1	Essam El-Hadary
CB	18	Wael Gomaa	(yellow card) 26'
CB	6	Hany Said
CB	4	Abdel-Zaher El-Saqqa		(substituted off) 75'
DM	3	Ahmed Elmohamady
RM	7	Ahmed Fathy		(substituted off) 46'
CM	17	Ahmed Hassan (c)
CM	5	Mohamed Aboutrika
LM	14	Sayed Moawad
CF	10	Emad Moteab
CF	15	Amr Zaki		(substituted off) 46'
Substitutes:
MF	8	Hosny Abd Rabo	(yellow card) 63'	(substituted on) 46'
FW	9	Mohamed Zidan		(substituted on) 46'
MF	2	Ahmed Eid Abdel Malek		(substituted on) 75'
GK	16	Abdel-Wahed El-Sayed
MF	11	Mohamed Shawky
MF	12	Mohamed Barakat
MF	13	Mohamed Homos
Manager:
Hassan Shehata

GK	1	Faouzi Chaouchi
CB	4	Antar Yahia		(substituted off) 67'
CB	2	Madjid Bougherra
CB	5	Rafik Halliche
DM	3	Nadir Belhadj	(yellow card) 1'
CM	8	Hassan Yebda
CM	6	Yazid Mansouri (c)
RW	18	Mourad Meghni		(substituted off) 57'
LW	15	Karim Ziani	(yellow card) 49'
CF	10	Rafik Saïfi	(yellow card) 53'	(substituted off) 89'
CF	9	Abdelkader Ghezzal	(yellow card) 21'
Substitutes:
FW	13	Karim Matmour		(substituted on) 57'
DF	17	Samir Zaoui		(substituted on) 67'
FW	14	Kamel Ghilas		(substituted on) 89'
GK	16	Mohamed Ousserir
DF	11	Slimane Raho
DF	12	Abdelkader Laïfaoui
MF	7	Yacine Bezzaz
Manager:
Rabah Saâdane

Assistant referees:
Evarist Menkouande (Cameroon)
Jason Damoo (Seychelles)

Match rules

- 90 minutes.
- Seven named substitutes.
- Maximum of three substitutions.

=== Aftermath ===
Egyptian media ran many stories about attacks that allegedly happened in Sudan. Al-Ahram, a state-owned Egyptian newspaper, reported that buses designated for Egyptian fans to be taken to the airport had been destroyed, forcing them to walk there under escort of the Sudanese army. Egypt's foreign ministry spoke of "Egypt's extreme displeasure with the assaults on Egyptian citizens who went to Khartoum to support the Egyptian team". Algerian diplomats said later that a widely broadcast video showing hundreds of Algerian fans brandishing knives had in fact been taken at an Algerian club match several years earlier. According to Al-Ahram, Sudanese diplomats suggested "scores" of Egyptians had been attacked and "a few" hurt. Egypt's health ministry later said there had been 20 deaths this day. The New York Times reported "no widespread rioting".

After the loss of the match, the Egyptian Football Association (EFA) filed a complaint with FIFA against the Algerian football delegation. The EFA indicated that "Egyptian fans, officials and players put their lives at risk before and after the match under threat from weapons, knives, swords and flares". The statement also threatened with the Egyptian team's withdrawal for two years from all international competitions as a sign of protest. On 18 May 2010, FIFA announced that conditions for opening disciplinary proceedings have not been met and closed the complaint.

About 12,000 Algerian fans celebrated on the Champs-Élysées in Paris and a lot more across France. However, among the numerous celebrating crowd, some offenders made the most of the situation to loot one supermarket and torch cars. There were 150 arrests across France.

Egypt's ambassador to the UK claimed thousands of fans had to flee to the airport for safety. Sudan summoned the Egyptian ambassador to protest at the media coverage of the Sudanese hosting of the match. That evening, over 1,000 Egyptians protested near the Algerian embassy in Zamalek, Cairo, burning flags, shouting anti-Algerian slogans and damaging cars and shops. The Interior Ministry said 11 police and 24 protesters were injured, and 20 people arrested.

== Subsequent events ==
On Friday, Alaa Mubarak telephoned a talk show, saying "We are Egyptian and we hold our head high, and whoever insults us should be smacked on his head." Hosni Mubarak said on national television that he would not condone the "humiliation" of Egyptians abroad. However, the Foreign Ministry said the government would not "tolerate violations against Algerian interests", suggesting a clampdown on protests.

Diplomats meeting to repair relations the next week reportedly characterised the dispute as "ultimately a fight among soccer fans" that "was picked up and inflamed by some elements in the media". An article in al-Ahram suggested that the Egyptians attending the match were mainly wealthy people who could afford to travel, rather than "the really tough fans" who could have defended themselves against assaults.

The two sides met again in Angola in January, for the 2010 Africa Cup of Nations semi-finals. Egypt cruised to a 4–0 victory, en route to an unprecedented 7th tournament win, in a hotly tempered match where Algeria had three players red carded. Match referee Coffi Codjia was indefinitely suspended by the Confederation of African Football for failing to send off Algerian goalkeeper Faouzi Chaouchi for headbutting the match official, only awarding the player a yellow card for the incident. Chaouchi was later one of the players to be dismissed, for a second bookable offence. He received a three match ban by CAF for the headbutt.

A meeting of Egyptian sports organisations agreed to be "prudent" when hosting events at which Algerians were competing, and not to travel to competitions in Algeria. The Egyptian Handball Federation was due to host the African Championships in February 2010; after a request for postponement was denied by the African Handball Confederation, it withdrew as host, but said it would still field a team. The CAHB canvassed for a new host, with only Algeria volunteering. The Egyptian federation announced it would host the tournament after all.

FIFA opened disciplinary proceedings against the Egyptian FA for its handling of the Algerian team's security in Cairo. On 23 November FIFA announced that its executive committee would hold an extraordinary general meeting on 2 December in Cape Town, where members were already due to meet to discuss the seedings for the World Cup, to discuss recent controversies. The Egypt–Algeria match was expected to figure, along with the dispute over France's handball goal against Ireland, and the investigation into a major match-fixing scam. FIFA's disciplinary committee was asked to launch an investigation; it was expected that the Algerian member of the committee would be recused. A report was expected by February 2010; Algeria's place at the World Cup finals was not in jeopardy.

On 20 November 2009, the Egyptian Football Association withdrew its membership from the Union of North African Football (UNAF), which also includes Algeria as a member. A few days later, on 25 November, Egyptian intellectuals signed a statement condemning the media hype and political manipulation of the dispute. Bouthaina Shaaban, an advisor to Syrian President Bashar al-Assad, condemned the dispute as distracting Arabs from the Israeli–Palestinian conflict.

There were reports that Libya's Muammar Gaddafi and Israel had each offered to mediate in the dispute. On 26 November, Reuters reported that a Sudanese mediation plan was nearing agreement.

On 1 December, al-Ahram reported that a village in the New Valley Governorate had applied to change its name from al-Jaza'ir ("Algeria") to Mubarak al-misriyin ("Mubarak for Egyptians").

A joint venture oil company announced on 6 December was seen as heralding a recovery in relations between the two countries. It was reported that Egypt would not return its ambassador to Algiers unless compensation was paid for damage to Egyptian property in Algeria. al-Ahram reported on 10 December that inflammatory media reports in both countries had been ended by order of the respective Presidents, following mediation by Gaddafi and al-Bashir.

Efforts by the UAE FA to broker an accord between the Egyptian and Algerian FAs were endorsed by Sepp Blatter.

== Analyses ==
Algeria claimed there was an orchestrated media campaign to damage its reputation and to create a fictitious enemy to Egypt, to rally the masses behind Gamal Mubarak and give him some legitimacy in his bid to inherit the presidency from his father. Foreign analysts suggested both governments encouraged protests about football to channel public discontent away from political issues. Jack Shenker suggests the anger was fomented primarily by the sensationalist media, with belated political endorsement. Others saw the violence as an expression of a general public malaise. On 22 November 2009, The Observer suggested an opposition backlash was building in Egypt to President Mubarak's stoking of the dispute. On 10 December, The New York Times made similar observations.

An Arab League spokesperson proposed that, in the future, celebrities and political leaders should not attend sensitive matches, lest they feed into public passions. Official planes had carried 200 Algerian MPs to the Cairo match, and 133 Egyptian celebrities to the Khartoum match.

== See also ==
- Algeria–Egypt football rivalry
