= 1990 FIFA World Cup qualification – CAF first round =

Football tournament qualification stage

The CAF first round was the first stage of the qualification for the 1990 FIFA World Cup in the Confederation of African Football (CAF) zone.

== Format ==
Eight knockout ties were originally drawn, involving the sixteen lowest ranked African countries.

- Angola v Sudan
- Zimbabwe v Lesotho
- Zambia v Rwanda
- Malawi v Uganda
- Libya v Burkina Faso
- Ghana v Liberia
- Tunisia v Guinea
- Gabon v Togo

Lesotho, Rwanda and Togo all withdrew after the draw was made. This meant their scheduled opponents – Zimbabwe, Zambia and Gabon – all advanced by walkover.

The winners of each tie advanced to the second round, where they were joined by the eight highest ranked African teams who received a bye in the first round.

== Matches ==
7 August 1988

Angola	0 – 0	Sudan

Estádio da Cidadela, Luanda
Attendance: 15,000
Referee: Modjiri Ubi Kemuare (Zaire)
11 November 1988

Sudan	1 – 2	Angola
Osama Idris 7'		Vieira Dias 79'; Mavó 85'

Al Merreikh Stadium, Khartoum
Attendance: 8,000
Referee: Osman Mohamud Halane (Somalia)

Angola won 2 – 1 on aggregate and advanced to the second round.

Zimbabwe	w/o	Lesotho
		Withdrew

Zimbabwe advanced to the second round after Lesotho withdrew.

Zambia	w/o	Rwanda
		Withdrew

Zambia advanced to the second round after Rwanda withdrew.

16 July 1988

Uganda	1 – 0	Malawi
Sunday Mokiri 66'

National Stadium, Kampala
Attendance: 5,613
Referee: Tahir Hafid Ali (Tanzania)
30 July 1988

Malawi	3 – 1	Uganda
Chirwa 3'; Kayira 6'; Waya 51'		Sunday Mokiri 69'

Civo Stadium, Lilongwe
Attendance: 25,000
Referee: William Moses Ochieng (Kenya)

Malawi won 3 – 2 on aggregate and advanced to the second round.

3 June 1988

Libya	3 – 0	Burkina Faso
Bezan 8'; El-Aisawi 22' (pen.); El-Ghadi 30'

June 11 Stadium, Tripoli
Attendance: 15,000
Referee: Ali Bin Nasser (Tunisia)
3 July 1988

Burkina Faso	2 – 0	Libya
Gnimassou 65'; Kadeba 73'

Stade du 4-Août, Ouagadougou
Referee: Badara Sène (Senegal)

Libya won 3 – 2 on aggregate and advanced to the second round.

7 August 1988

Ghana	0 – 0	Liberia

Accra Sports Stadium, Accra
Attendance: 35,000
Referee: Linus Mba (Nigeria)
21 August 1988

Liberia	2 – 0	Ghana
Weah 27'; Debbah 88'

National Stadium, Monrovia
Attendance: 22,070
Referee: Alhagi Faye (Gambia)

Liberia won 2 – 0 on aggregate and advanced to the second round.

5 August 1988

Tunisia	5 – 0	Guinea
Jeridi 3'; Maâloul 11'; Limam 75', 89'; Yâakoubi 82'

Stade El Menzah, Tunis
Attendance: 15,000
Referee: Mohamed Hossameldin (Egypt)
21 August 1988

Guinea	3 – 0	Tunisia
Emmerson 34', 82'; Toure 49'

Stade du 28 Septembre, Conakry
Attendance: 15,000
Referee: Dodji Kouassi (Togo)

Tunisia won 5 – 3 on aggregate and advanced to the second round.

Gabon	w/o	Togo
		Withdrew

Gabon advanced to the second round after Togo withdrew.
