= Algeria–Egypt relations =

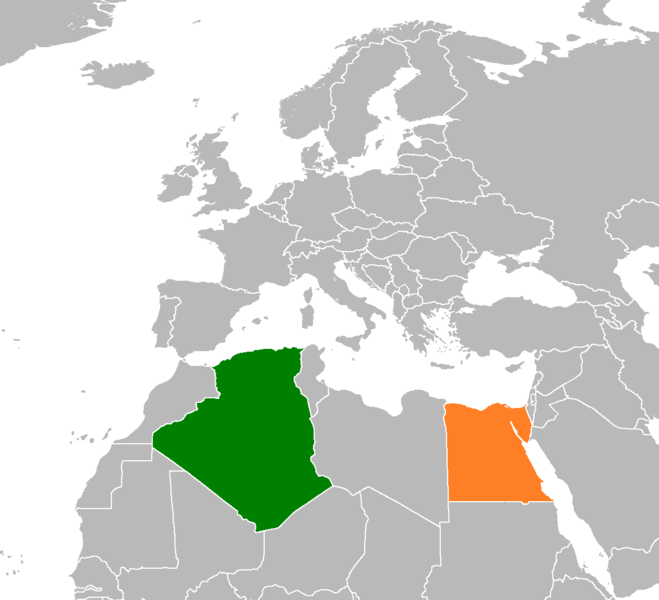
- Algeria: Egypt

Diplomatic mission
- Embassy of Algeria, Cairo: Embassy of Egypt, Algiers

Relations between Egypt and Algeria have been generally friendly throughout their history which dates back to Egypt's strong support for Ahmed Ben Bella's FLN during the Algerian War of Independence. This was later followed by Algeria's support for Egypt during the Six-Day War in 1967 and the October War in 1973. In addition both countries are member states of the Arab League while sharing similar views on major regional issues such as the Palestinian cause and the conflict in Sudan as well as the same vision on reforming the United Nations Security Council. Algeria has an embassy in Cairo, while Egypt has an embassy in Algiers. Both are members of the Arab League and the Organisation of Islamic Cooperation.

== History ==
=== Algerian revolutionary movement ===
During the eight-year-long Algerian struggle for independence against French rule, Egyptian President Gamal Abdel Nasser was a strong vocal supporter of the resistance movement and provided significant military aid to the National Liberation Front (FLN). This had prompted increasing French anger towards Nasser which, in addition to Nasser's nationalization of the Suez Canal, drove them to join the United Kingdom and Israel in an attack on Egypt during the Suez Crisis of 1956. Even General André Beaufre, commander of the French forces during the confrontation, said that "France would have fewer problems if Nasser was removed," a clear reference to the Egyptian president's ongoing support for Ahmed Ben Bella leader of the FLN. Records from archives and conversations further substantiate the French position and this was clearly portrayed in a conversation between US Secretary of State John Foster Dulles and US President Dwight D. Eisenhower where it was claimed that "the French would rather fight at the center of trouble (Egypt) rather than around the periphery of difficulty (Algeria)". For France, Suez had always been about Algeria and traditional narratives therefore argue that the Egyptian victory following the crisis bolstered the FLN's cause. On several occasions, Nasser showed signs of determination to support the Algerians, according to his advisor Fathi al-Dib, and he even directed al-Dib to deliver as many arms and supplies as possible to the FLN by any means necessary even through airlifts if possible. Many shipments were smuggled through the border with Libya and this was in addition to the Algerians who received military training in Egypt, although this was initially denied by the Egyptian government when questioned by the international community. Other forms of weapon delivery to the FLN came through the sea and this had come to light when in 1956, a Sudanese-flagged ship, the Athos, was on its way from Egypt to Algiers when it was intercepted by the French Navy and was found with a cargo of arms destined to the FLN including 2,300 rifles, 90 mortars and many other kinds of weaponry.

=== Post-independence relations ===
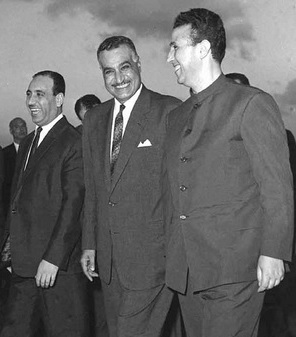
Egyptian President Gamal Abdel Nasser (center) receiving Algerian President Ahmed Ben Bella (right) for the Arab League summit in Alexandria, September 1964.

Following the FLN's victory and the withdrawal of French troops with Algeria eventually gaining full independence, Ahmed Ben Bella wanted Nasser to be the first guest of independent Algeria upon officially taking over power on 20 September 1962. This was due to the warm relationship between both leaders which dated back to Ben Bella's long stay in Cairo at the initial phase of the Algerian War. Morocco's King Hassan II however accepted his invitation earlier than Nasser but he merely received the same welcoming Algerians gave Nasser when he arrived with thousands rushing from all over Algeria in order to see him. This strong appreciation for Nasser was apparent in the following decades even after his death due to the Nasser's introduction of pan-Arabism, often called Nasserism, in Algeria with Ben Bella being a staunch Nasserist. Ben Bella had established a special bureau designated for Arab world affairs which he dealt with cooperatively with Nasser and ties between both leaders were so strong that rumors started to appear about a Cairo-Algiers axis aimed at dominating North Africa and about Algeria's possible joining of the United Arab Republic that included Egypt and Syria.

Upon the outbreak of the Sand War between Algeria and Morocco when Moroccan forces attempted to claim the regions of Tindouf and Béchar from Algeria, Nasser, along with Cuba, immediately rushed arms to Algeria and sent a contingent of 1,000 troops who fought alongside the Algerians where 5 or more Egyptian officers were captured as prisoners of war.

==== Wars of 1967 and 1973 ====
Algeria played significant combat roles in both the 1967 and 1973 Arab–Israeli wars. A cargo of main battle tanks was dispatched to Egypt though a ship from Algeria with the approval of the Soviets in addition to 37 MiG-17s and two or three MiG-21s during the 1967 war. When Egypt had been suffering significant military losses during the 1967 Arab–Israeli war, Nasser telephoned Algeria's second president Houari Boumediene explaining to him the situation and how many pilots his air force had lost. Boumediene responded by sending as many aircraft as the Algerian Air Force (QJA) could spare including a squadron of MiG-21F-13s as part of an air brigade under the command of Abdelrazek Bouhara. However, when Egyptian pilots traveled to Algeria in order collect their destined aircraft, the war had already ended back on the front line shortly before their return to Egypt.

During the 1973 war, Algeria sent a squadron of MiG-21s and Su-7s to Egypt which arrived at the front engaging in combat between October 9 and October 11. This was in addition to another contingent consisting of two squadrons of MiG-21F-13s and PFs with QJA forward headquarters already stationed in Egypt as early as 1970. It also sent an armored unit of 150 tanks which began to arrive on October 17 but reached the front on October 24, too late to participate in combat. Algeria also participated on the Egyptian front by sending its 8th Infantry Mechanical Regiment. This included over 2,100 troops, 815 non-commissioned officers, and 192 officers. Following the war, Algeria, along with the Soviet Union, financed Egypt and Syria by giving them both US$200 million in order to facilitate their future arms purchases.

==== Peace treaty with Israel ====
Relations between both countries however, have seen an unprecedented level of tensions following the Egyptian president Anwar Sadat's decision to visit to Israel on 19–21 November 1977 and his intentions to negotiate with the Israelis, which Algeria, and several other Arab states, considered a stab in the back. Libya's Muammar Gaddafi denounced the visit as soon as it was announced and when it eventually took place, he called for a summit meeting in Tripoli on December 2 that included Algeria, Syria, Iraq, South Yemen and the PLO who later called themselves the "Front of Steadfastness and Confrontation" in what was officially termed the Tripoli Declaration intended to put pressure on Egypt to withdraw its decisions to make peace with Israel. During this meeting, Algeria along with other participants called for Egypt's expulsion from the Arab League and which concluded with all member states freezing their ties with Egypt calling on all Arab states to give their full support to Syria as the main point of confrontation and condemned Sadat's actions as "high treason". In response, Sadat severed ties with every country that participated in the initiative, including Algeria, and gave their ambassadors 24 hours to leave the country. In March 1979, following the Camp David Accords, Egypt was expelled from the Arab League with almost all member states cutting-off diplomatic ties with Egypt and subjecting it to the same boycott as Israel. Tensions remained between Egypt and Algeria and it wasn't until November 1988 when Algeria decided to re-establish relations with Egypt.

==== Current relations (1988–present) ====
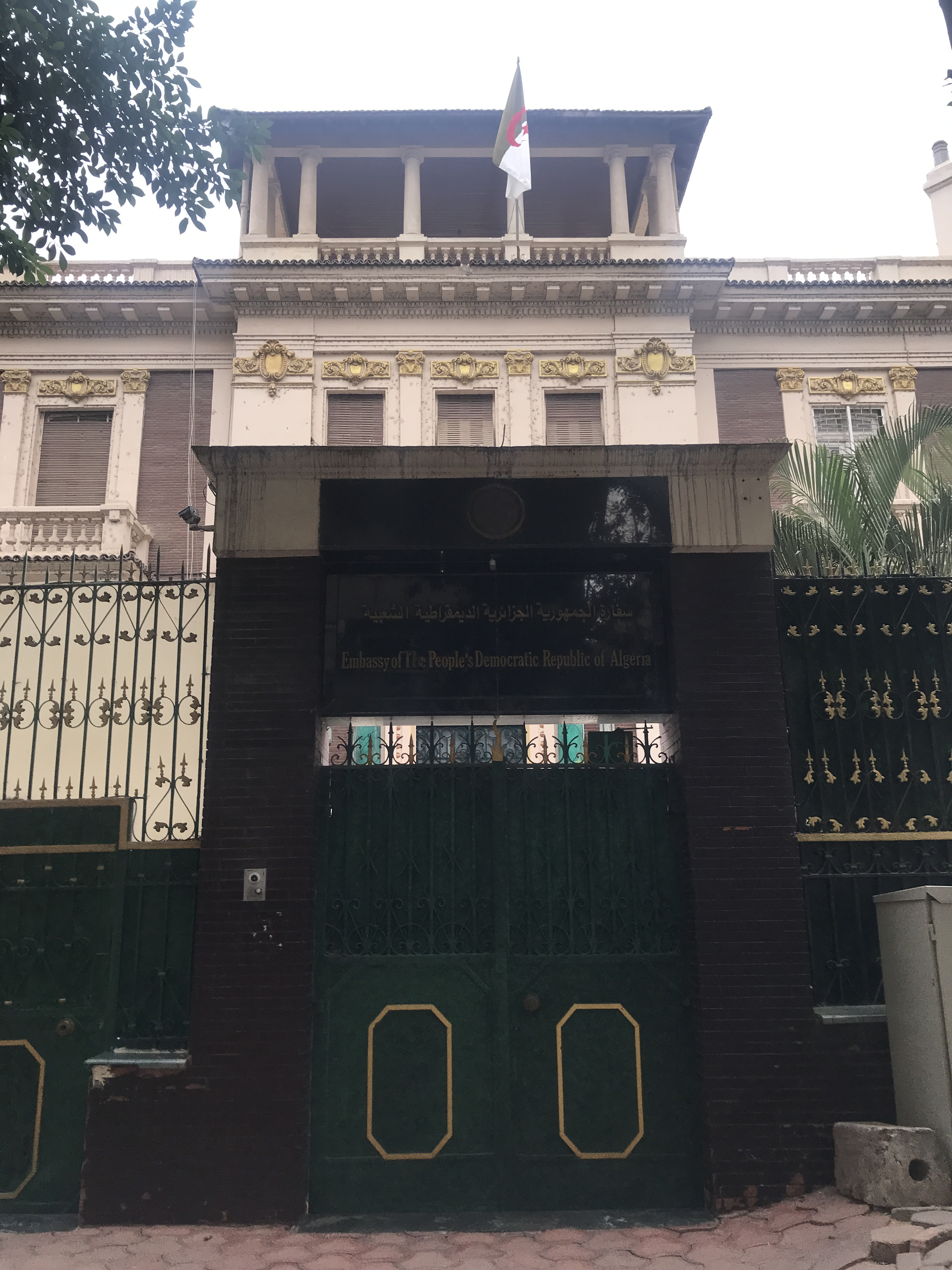
Embassy of Algeria in Cairo

On 25 June 2014, Egyptian president Abdel Fattah el-Sisi made his first official visit abroad since his election a month earlier to Algeria, where regional security was top of the agenda. Both sides discussed ways to counter Islamic militancy in North Africa as the meeting came amid rising terrorist activity in Libya with whom both countries share long borders. President el-Sisi stressed that both countries should collaborate with “a coordination of positions” in order to overcome these issues and that this cooperation. A month earlier, the two countries sought to hold a Joint Algerian-Egyptian Higher Committee to would meet in June when Egypt elects a new president. Diplomatic sources from both countries told the website Al-Monitor that "Egypt and Algeria will become the two arms of a pincer on the Libyan desert". During the meeting, Algeria agreed to ship five 145,000 m^{2} cargoes of liquefied natural gas to Egypt before the end of 2014. This was aimed at helping Egypt to overcome its worst energy crisis in years due to three years of nationwide turmoil.

In May 2026, Egypt and Algeria signed a memorandum of understanding to cooperate on crude oil trade, allowing Egypt to import Algerian crude oil and petroleum products in the future. The agreement was signed between Egypt’s General Petroleum Corporation and Algeria’s state energy company Sonatrach during a visit by Egypt’s petroleum minister Karim Badawi to Algeria, in the presence of Algerian Energy Minister Mohamed Arkab. The deal is aimed at strengthening energy security, diversifying Egypt’s oil supply sources, and expanding cooperation between the two countries in the oil and gas sector.

== Economic and business ties ==
By 31% of the total capital value of the approved projects, Egypt ranks first among foreign countries investing in Algeria outside the fuel sector with Egyptian investments in Algeria, according to the 2008 statistics, reaching approximately $5.3 billion. The volume of trade exchange between the two countries was valued at almost $1.5 billion in 2012 (up 11% over the 2011 figures). According to figures released by the Algerian Customs Authority in January 2013, Egyptian exports occupied third place among Arab exporting countries with exports calculated at $380.56 million as compared to $876.51 million of Algeria's imports. Egypt's main exports have valued nearly one billion and 16 million EGP and included building materials, food products, metal products, copper wires, drugs, minibuses, chemical substances & water heaters. Algerian exports on the other hand have reached 895 million and 568 thousand EGP, and included metal products, liquefied natural gas, propane, cardboard and condensers for air conditioning.

On 15 February 2002, Egypt's telecommunications giant Orascom Telecom Holding officially launched its Algeria-based branch Djezzy GSM after acquiring the country's second GSM license. It quickly became Algeria's main mobile network operator with an alleged $7 billion worth of value as of September 2011, and as of November 2011 it had a market share of 65% and over 16,49 million subscribers covering 90% of the country's population. Djezzy's achievements have been challenged though with increasing Algerian government pressure to fine Orascom $1.3 billion for allegedly violating foreign-exchange regulations and the government's intentions to purchase controlling stakes in the network. The company's issues were eased however when sanctions were lifted by the government in March 2013, allowing it to begin purchasing and importing new technology and equipment, in addition to granting it the right to convert its profits. The ruling came as a response to a request by Banque d'Algérie and the Algerian finance minister to the government urging it to lift sanctions and acknowledged the transfer ownership of the company, with 51% of its shares already owned by the Algerian government, and with the company changing its name from Orascom Telecom Algeria to Optimum Telecom Algeria.

== Resident diplomatic missions ==
- Algeria has an embassy in Cairo.
- Egypt has an embassy in Algiers.

== See also ==
- Foreign relations of Algeria
- Foreign relations of Egypt
- 2009 Egypt–Algeria World Cup dispute

== Bibliography ==
- Aburish, Said K. (2004), Nasser, the Last Arab, New York City: St. Martin's Press, ISBN 9780312286835
- Connely, Matthew (2002), A Diplomatic Revolution: Algeria's Fight for Independence and the Origins of the Post-Cold War Era, Oxford: Oxford University Press, ISBN 9780199881802
- Ottaway, David (1970), Algeria: The Politics of a Socialist Revolution, Berkeley, California: University of California Press, ISBN 9780520016552
- Abdel-Malek, Anouar (1964), "Nasserism and Socialism", The Socialist Register, Merlin Press
- Nicolle, David; Cooper, Tom (2004), Arab MiG-19 and MiG-21 Units in Combat, Oxford: Osprey Publishing, ISBN 9781841766553
- Ro'i, Yaacov; Morozov, Boris (2008), The Soviet Union and the June 1967 Six Day War, Palo Alto, California: Stanford University Press, ISBN 9780804758802
- El-Shazly, Lt. Gen. Saad (2003). The Crossing of the Suez, Revised Edition. American Mideast Research. ISBN 0960456228.
- Gebril, Mahmoud (1988). Imagery and Ideology in U.S. Policy Toward Libya 1969–1982. University of Pittsburgh Press. ISBN 9780822976516.
- Lea, David; Rowe, Annamarie (2001). A Political Chronology of Africa. Taylor & Francis. ISBN 9781857431162.
- Ciment, James; Hill, Kenneth (1999). Encyclopedia of Conflict Since World War II. Routledge. ISBN 9781579581817.
