= 2009 Houphouët-Boigny stampede =

Fatal crowd crush in Ivory Coast

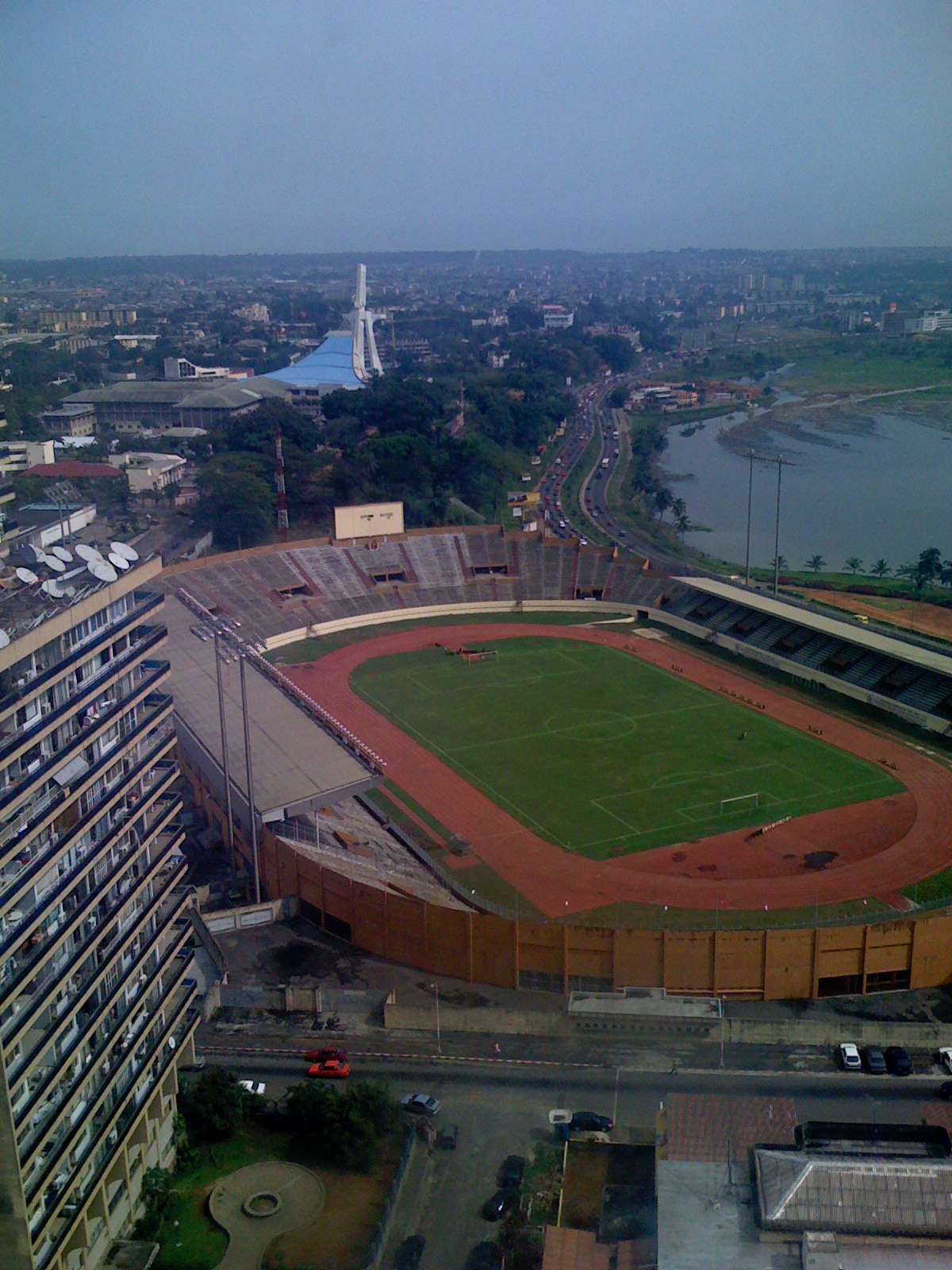
- Félix Houphouët-Boigny Stadium location of the stampede
- Date: 29 March 2009
- Location: Stade Félix Houphouët-Boigny, Abidjan, Ivory Coast
- Cause: Stampede
- Deaths: 19
- Injuries: 135

The 2009 Houphouët-Boigny stampede occurred on 29 March 2009 in the Stade Félix Houphouët-Boigny in Abidjan, Ivory Coast before a 2010 FIFA World Cup qualification match between Malawi and Ivory Coast. Nineteen people were killed and 135 were injured. In an attempt to control a crowd crush, police fired tear gas into the crowds, who had begun jostling with each other at least 40 minutes before kick off. The match was particularly popular among locals, with world stars such as Didier Drogba, Sol Bamba and Salomon Kalou due to play for Ivory Coast.

== Overview ==
The match was the first match in group 5 of round 3 of the CAF zonal qualifying. It was played despite the deaths occurring before kick off, and was won 5–0 by Ivory Coast. Officials have said that ticketless football fans were to blame for the stampede. Ivorian Prime Minister Guillaume Soro held a crisis meeting with ministers and football officials on 30 March to discuss the tragedy. FIFA President Sepp Blatter said: "I wish to express extreme sorrow and extend our condolences to the Ivorian football community and, most importantly, to family, friends and loved ones following the tragic deaths in Abidjan yesterday. FIFA has also launched an inquiry into how the tragedy happened".

On 9 May 2009 FIFA decided to extend its investigation into the event, and they interviewed members of the Ivorian Football Federation, police and other local and national organisations. FIFA had not given a deadline for the conclusion of the investigation.

On 22 July 2009, FIFA fined the Ivorian Football Federation $47,000 following the enquiry into the stadium tragedy. Football's world governing body imposed a series of safety measures after concluding the long investigation. FIFA also announced a donation of $96,000 to a fund set up for the families of the victims.

Earlier casualties at incidents at football matches in Africa included 127 people killed in 2001 in the AccraSports Stadium crowd stampede in Ghana, 11 people killed in rioting in September 2008 in the Democratic Republic of Congo, and eight crushed to death in June 2008 in Liberia.
