= Ibrahim Balarabe-Abdullahi =

Speaker of the Nasarawa State House of Assembly in Nigeria

Ibrahim Balarabe-Abdullahi is a Nigerian politician and former two term speaker of the Nasarawa State House of Assembly. He was first elected speaker of the 5th Nasarawa State house of Assembly in 2015 and was unanimously re-elected for a second term as speaker of the 6th Assembly in 2019. Balarabe-Abdullahi represents Umaisha/Ugya state constituency in the state assembly on the platform of the All Progressives Congress (APC). Balarabe-Abdullahi was nominated for the speaker of the 6th Assembly by Mohammed Okpoku of the APC (Udege/Loko constituency) and was seconded by Aliyu Dogara of the APC (Wamba constituency).

In January 2020, Balarabe-Abdullahi party’s national leadership passed a vote of confidence on his leadership of the Nasarawa State House of Assembly saying he is an asset to the party.
