= Kande Balarabe =

Nigerian politician

Saadatu Kande Balarabe

House of Representatives, Federal Republic of Nigeria from Kano State
- In office 1983–1983

Personal details
- Born: 03/03/1951
- Died: 03/08/2003 Kano State
- Education: Freetown Girls School & Royal School of Nursing, London, United Kingdom.
- Occupation: Nurse; Politician

Sa'adatu Kande Balarabe was a Nigerian politician from Kano State. She was among the three pioneer women elected into the Nigerian House of Representatives in 1983, and the first woman from Northern Nigerian.

She was a member of the Constituent Assembly during President Ibrahim Babangida's administration in 1987 to 1989.

She has served in various positions in her state including Director General, Women Commission, Kano State.

She was believed to be a Ministerial Nominee under President Moshood Abiola's cabinet, before the election was annulled on June 12, 1993.

== Life ==
Kande was born in Sierra Leone where her father was engaged in business. She attended Freetown Girls School, and later proceeded to Royal School of Nursing in London, United Kingdom. In 1982, during the Second Republic, Kande became a leader of PRP's Women Wing in Kano. Prior to entering politics, she was a nurse in a Murtala Mohammed Hospital, and also served as a President School of Nursing. However, in 1982, she resigned to spend most of her time in politics. In 1983, she contested and won a seat into the Nigerian House of Representatives, however, the second republic was truncated. In 1987, she became a member of the Constituent Assembly, representing her constituency and was later appointed Director General, Women Commission, Kano State.
