= Eugène Kabongo =

Congolese footballer

Personal information
- Full name: Eugène Kabongo Ngoy
- Date of birth: 3 November 1960 (age 65)
- Place of birth: Kinshasa, Zaire
- Height: 1.85 m (6 ft 1 in)
- Position: Forward

Senior career*
| Years | Team | Apps | (Gls) |
| 1983–1985 | Seraing | 27 | (20) |
| 1985–1986 | RC Paris | 30 | (29) |
| 1986–1987 | Anderlecht | 9 | (1) |
| 1987–1990 | Lyon | 97 | (65) |
| 1990–1992 | Bastia | 26 | (15) |
| Total | | 189 | (130) |

International career
| 1983–1991 | Zaire | | |
- * Club domestic league appearances and goals

Eugène Kabongo Ngoy (born 3 November 1960) is a Congolese former professional footballer who played as a forward for R.F.C. Seraing, RC Paris, Anderlecht, Olympique Lyonnais and Bastia.

== Career statistics ==
=== International ===
Scores and results list DR Congo's goal tally first, score column indicates score after each Kabongo goal.

List of international goals scored by Eugène Kabongo
| No. | Date | Venue | Opponent | Score | Result | Competition | Ref. |
|---|---|---|---|---|---|---|---|
| 1 | 31 March 1985 | Brazzaville, Republic of the Congo | Congo | 2–0 | 5–2 | 1986 African Cup of Nations qualification | |
| 2 | 31 March 1985 | Brazzaville, Republic of the Congo | Congo | 5–1 | 5–2 | 1986 African Cup of Nations qualification | |
| 3 | 16 March 1988 | Stade Mohammed V, Casablanca, Morocco | Ivory Coast | 1–0 | 1–1 | 1988 African Cup of Nations | |
| 4 | 22 January 1989 | Independence Stadium, Lusaka, Zambia | Zambia | 1–3 | 2–4 | 1990 FIFA World Cup qualification | |
| 5 | 22 January 1989 | Independence Stadium, Lusaka, Zambia | Zambia | 2–4 | 2–4 | 1990 FIFA World Cup qualification | |
| 6 | 13 August 1989 | Stade Tata Raphaël, Kinshasa, Democratic Republic of the Congo | Zambia | 1–0 | 1–0 | 1990 FIFA World Cup qualification | |
| 7 | 19 August 1990 | Stade des Martyrs, Kinshasa, Democratic Republic of the Congo | Tanzania | 1–0 | 2–0 | 1992 African Cup of Nations qualification | |
| 8 | 19 August 1990 | Stade des Martyrs, Kinshasa, Democratic Republic of the Congo | Tanzania | 2–0 | 2–0 | 1992 African Cup of Nations qualification | |
| 9 | 1 September 1990 | Nakivubo Stadium, Kampala Uganda | Uganda | 1–1 | 1–2 | 1992 African Cup of Nations qualification | |
| 10 | 11 October 1992 | Stade Tata Raphaël, Kinshasa, Democratic Republic of the Congo | Liberia | 1–1 | 4–2 | 1994 FIFA World Cup qualification | |
| 11 | 11 October 1992 | Stade Tata Raphaël, Kinshasa, Democratic Republic of the Congo | Liberia | 2–1 | 4–2 | 1994 FIFA World Cup qualification | |
