= Balaraba Aliyu Inuwa =

Nigerian commissioner

Balaraba Aliyu Inuwa(born 24 January, 2024) is a development practitioner. She is currently the lead consultant at Saffron Concepts Nigerian Limited. She was the commissioner of Zaria Metropolitan Authority from 2021 to 2024, the commissioner of public works and infrastructure for Kaduna State, Nigeria from 2019 to 2021, and the commissioner of Rural and Community Development Kaduna State, Nigeria, from 2016 to 2019 under governors Uba Sani and Nasir Ahmad el-Rufai respectively.

== Early life and education ==
Aliyu-Inuwa was born in Kaduna State, Nigeria. She began her education at Airforce Primary School in Victoria Island, Lagos, and later attended the British School of Paris for her secondary education. In 1997, she earned a Bachelor of Arts degree in French language and literature from Ahmadu Bello University. In 2023, she obtained two master's degrees: one in sustainable development from the University of Sussex, United Kingdom, and another in development studies and policy analysis from Kaduna State University.

== Career ==
Aliyu-Inuwa began her public service career in 2015 as the special adviser to the governor of Kaduna State on rural and community development. In this capacity, she designed the Kaduna Rural Development Program (KRDP) and led efforts to localize the Sustainable Development Goals (SDGs).

In 2016, she was appointed as commissioner for rural and community development, a newly established ministry, where she spearheaded initiatives such as rural electrification and the implementation of the Millennium Village model.

From 2019 to 2021, she served as commissioner for public works and infrastructure, where she oversaw the Kaduna Urban Development Project and the Zaria Water Project.

In 2021, she was appointed the administrator (mayor) of the Zaria Metropolitan Authority, focusing on city infrastructure, revenue generation, and urban planning.

== International Development Work ==
Between 2008 and 2011, Aliyu-Inuwa worked as a technical adviser in the office of the senior special assistant to the president on MDGs, where she contributed to national policy formulation and monitoring of MDG indicators.

From 2011 to 2015, she served as deputy director and education specialist at the Earth Institute, Columbia University, where she coordinated the MDG LG Scale-up Project, reaching over 20 million Nigerians.

She also worked with ActionAid International from 2004 to 2008, where she coordinated education programs and regional learning networks across sub-Saharan Africa.

== Advocacy and Impact ==
Aliyu-Inuwa is a long-standing advocate for women’s rights and the inclusion of underserved populations. Her work emphasizes sustainable community growth, equitable access to public services, and inclusive governance. She is known for her strategic planning skills, policy analysis, and stakeholder engagement across government, civil society, and international agencies.

== Personal life ==
Balaraba Aliyu-Inuwa is married and fluent in English, French, and Hausa.
