= Lucky Msiska =

Zambian footballer and manager (born 1960)

Personal information
- Date of birth: 17 March 1960 (age 66)
- Place of birth: Northern Rhodesia
- Height: 1.76 m (5 ft 9 in)
- Position: Midfielder

Senior career*
Years	Team	Apps	(Gls)
- Power Dyanmos
- Roeselare

International career
1984–1990	Zambia		

Managerial career
- 2011: Zambia U23
- * Club domestic league appearances and goals

Lucky Msiska (born 17 March 1960) is a Zambian football manager and former player who played as a midfielder.

== Playing career ==
Born in Northern Rhodesia (now Zambia), Msiska played club football for local side Power Dynamos F.C. before signing with Belgian club K.F.C. Roeselare.

Msiska played for the Zambia national team at the 1988 Summer Olympics in Seoul. He also played for the senior side at the 1990 African Cup of Nations and appeared in several FIFA World Cup qualifying matches.

== Managerial career ==
Following his playing career, Msiska became a manager of youth clubs in Belgium. He joined the technical staff of the Zambia national team in 2005. Msiska also managed the Zambia national under-23 football team in the qualifiers for the 2012 Summer Olympics.
