= Abdelfettah Rhiati =

Moroccan footballer

Personal information
- Date of birth: 25 February 1963 (age 63)
- Place of birth: Fez, Morocco
- Height: 1.79 m (5 ft 10 1/2 in)
- Position: Forward

Senior career*
Years	Team	Apps	(Gls)
1982-1988	MAS Fez		
1988-1989	FC Aarau		
1989-1990	Neuchatel Xamax		
1990-1991	MAS Fez		

International career
	Morocco	12	(4)
- * Club domestic league appearances and goals

Abdelfettah Rhiati (born 25 February 1963) is a Moroccan football forward who played for Morocco in the 1986 FIFA World Cup. He also played for MAS Fez.
