= Abubakar Balarabe =

Nigerian footballer

Personal information
- Full name: Abubakar Balarabe
- Date of birth: 14 June 1968 (age 58)
- Place of birth: Nigeria
- Position: Forward

Senior career*
Years	Team	Apps	(Gls)
–1989	Ranchers Bees		
1989–1991	Eeklo	30	(3)
1993–1995	MVV Maastricht	18	(1)
1998	Kuala Lumpur FA		

International career
1989	Nigeria	2	(2)
- * Club domestic league appearances and goals

Abubakar Balarabe (born 14 June 1968) is a former Nigerian international footballer who played as a midfielder for clubs in Nigeria, Belgium, the Netherlands and Malaysia.

== Club career ==
Balarabe began playing football for Ranchers Bees of Kaduna. He moved to Europe in 1989, and would play for K.F.C. Eeklo and MVV Maastricht.

== International career ==
Balarabe made two appearances for the senior Nigeria national football team. He scored on his debut, a 1990 African Nations Cup qualifier against Guinea in 1989.
