= Jameleddine Limam =

Tunisian footballer

Personal information
- Date of birth: 11 June 1967 (age 59)
- Place of birth: Tunis, Tunisia
- Height: 1.75 m (5 ft 9 in)
- Position: Forward

Senior career*
Years	Team	Apps	(Gls)
1986–1988	Stade Tunisien		
1988–1990	Standard Liège		
1990–1991	Eintracht Braunschweig	19	(0)
1991–1993	Al-Ittihad		
1993–1997	Stade Tunisien		
1997–2001	Club Africain		
2001–2002	Stade Tunisien		
2002–2003	Club Africain		

International career
1987–1998	Tunisia	57	(4)
- * Club domestic league appearances and goals

Jameleddine Limam (born 11 June 1967) is a Tunisian former professional footballer who played as a forward for the Tunisia national team.

He represented Tunisia at the 1994 and 1996 African Cup of Nations, as well as the 1988 Olympic Games.

He is now a football agent.
