= Yao Amani =

Ivorian footballer

Personal information
- Full name: Yao Lambert César Amani
- Date of birth: 17 September 1963 (age 63)
- Place of birth: Tiassalé, Ivory Coast
- Position: Midfielder

Senior career*
Years	Team	Apps	(Gls)
1980-1986	Rio Sports d'Anyama		
1986-1988	Africa Sports National		
1988-1992	ASEC Mimosas		
1993-1994	Africa Sports National		

International career
1986–1994	Ivory Coast	18	(2)
- * Club domestic league appearances and goals

Yao Lambert Amani (born 17 September 1963) is an Ivorian footballer. He played in 18 matches for the Ivory Coast national football team from 1986 to 1994. He was also named in the Ivory Coast's squad for the 1988 African Cup of Nations tournament.
