= Felix Houphouet Boigny Stadium =

Multi-use stadium in Abidjan, Ivory Coast

- Le Félicia
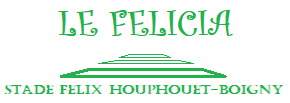

- Aerial view of the stadium in September 2023
- Interactive map of Felix Houphouet Boigny Stadium
- Full name: Felix Houphouet Boigny Stadium
- Former names: Stade Géo André
- Location: Le Plateau, Abidjan nord, Abidjan
- Coordinates: 5°19′42″N 4°1′6″W
- Owner: Government of Ivory Coast
- Capacity: 33,000
- Surface: Grass
- Field size: 105m x 68m

Construction
- Built: 1952
- Opened: 1964
- Renovated: 2009, 2017, 2020–2023
- General contractor: Mota-Engil (2020–23 renovations)

Tenants
- ASEC Mimosas (1964–present); Ivory Coast national football team (1964–present)

The Felix Houphouet Boigny Stadium, nicknamed Le Félicia, is a multi-purpose stadium, which can host football, rugby union and athletics, in Abidjan, Ivory Coast. It is the former national stadium of the Ivory Coast national football team. It is named after the first president of the country, Félix Houphouët-Boigny, and is located in the commune of Le Plateau. The stadium has a capacity of 33,000. It also hosts matches of ASEC Mimosas. It has been the site of several deadly stampedes.

== History ==
Built in 1964 to organize the "Games of Abidjan", the stadium was formerly known as Stade Andre Geo, and it took the name of the President Felix Houphouet-Boigny after undergoing restoration.

Gradually it emerged as the National Stadium, hosting the ASEC Mimosas and Ivorian Soccer Team.

Along the Stadium of Peace of Bouake, Stade Felix Houphouet-Boigny hosted Africa Cup of Nations soccer. In 2009 after a complete renovation, which included lawn seating and the treatment room, the stadium hosted the 2009 African Championship of Nations.

The stadium was renovated for the 2017 Jeux de la Francophonie.

The stadium played host to Amnesty International's Human Rights Now! Benefit Concert on October 9, 1988. The show was headlined by Sting and Peter Gabriel and also featured Bruce Springsteen & The E Street Band, Tracy Chapman and Youssou N'Dour.

The American singer Chris Brown finished his Carpe Diem Tour at this stadium on December 30, 2012.

=== Incidents ===
On March 29, 2009, during the match between Ivory Coast and Malawi, the gateway to an open corner of the stadium gave way before the kick-off of the match. A stampede ensued when 19 people were killed by trampling. Over 130 were injured as well.

On January 1, 2013, following a New Year's Eve fireworks display, another stampede took place, in which sixty-one lives were claimed, with upwards of 200 injuries sustained.

=== 2020 Renovations ===
Renovations for the 2023 Africa Cup of Nations began in April 2020 and concluded in 2023. The renovation was performed by Mota-Engil and included the installation of a complete roof and an increase in capacity to 33,000 seats.

On 15 October 2023, The newly renovated stadium hosted an international friendly between host Ivory Coast and Morocco, which ended 1-1. The re-opening of the venue was attended by some of the senior government officials, the Local Organising Committee Vice-Chairman and FIF President Idriss Yacine Diallo and CAF officials.

=== 2023 Africa Cup of Nations ===
The stadium was one of the venues for the 2023 Africa Cup of Nations.

The following matches were played at the stadium:

Date	Time (GMT)	Team #1	Result	Team #2	Round	Spectators
14 January 2024	17:00	Egypt	2–2	Mozambique	Group B	32,592
14 January 2024	20:00	Ghana	1–2	Cape Verde	Group B	11,943
18 January 2024	20:00	Egypt	2–2	Ghana	Group B	20,808
19 January 2024	14:00	Cape Verde	3–0	Mozambique	Group B	5,794
22 January 2024	17:00	Guinea-Bissau	0–1	Nigeria	Group A	15,650
22 January 2024	20:00	Cape Verde	2–2	Egypt	Group B	15,650
27 January 2024	20:00	Nigeria	2–0	Cameroon	Round of 16	22,085
29 January 2024	17:00	Cape Verde	1–0	Mauritania	Round of 16	16,088
2 February 2024	17:00	Nigeria	1–0	Angola	Quarter-finals	18,757
10 February 2024	20:00	South Africa	0–0 (a.e.t.) (6–5 p)	DR Congo	Third place play-off	21,975

== Structure ==
The stands are painted in national colours consist of curves, the gallery lagoon side of the podium, a gallery and a presidential box, VIP, and BVIP .

The stage contains a media room, a room control used for anti-doping, a VIP room, a treatment room, offices of arbitrators, a massage room, and four dressing rooms.

The stadium has a video board 220 volts for 35 kwh, 16.50 meters by 5.70 meters.

The lawn is of international standard and is maintained daily green and glowing.

== See also ==
- Lists of stadiums

Preceded by June 11 Stadium; Tripoli	African Cup of Nations; Final Venue; 1984	Succeeded by Cairo International Stadium; Cairo
