= Peter Dawo =

Kenyan footballer (born 1964)

Personal information
- Full name: Peter Dawo
- Date of birth: 1964 (age 61–62)
- Place of birth: Kericho, Kenya
- Position: Forward

Senior career*
Years	Team	Apps	(Gls)
–	MTI	–	(–)
1987–1990	Gor Mahia	–	(–)
1990	Arab Contractors	–	(1)
1991	Al-Seeb	–	(1)
1991–1992	Gor Mahia	–	(–)

International career
1987–1990	Kenya	–	(–)
- * Club domestic league appearances and goals

Peter Dawo (born 1964) is a former Kenya international football forward who played for clubs in Kenya, Egypt and Oman.

== Club career ==
Born in Kericho, Dawo began playing football in the local league for MTI. After performing well with MTI, he was noticed by Gor Mahia F.C. and signed for the club in 1987.

In his first season with Gor Mahia, Dawo helped the club win a domestic league and cup double. He also led the club to its first and only African Cup Winners' Cup title in 1987, scoring 10 goals in the competition. Following these exploits, Dawo finished seventh in the voting for 1987 African Footballer of the Year.

In 1990, Dawo signed for Egyptian league side Arab Contractors SC. He only managed one goal during the season, and moved to Omani side Al-Seeb the following season.

Dawo returned to play for Gor Mahia in the remainder of the 1991 season, winning the domestic league. He would retire from playing after the season.

== International career ==
Dawo made several appearances for the Kenya national football team, including five FIFA World Cup qualifying matches. He played for Kenya at the 1988 and 1990 African Cup of Nations finals.

== Personal ==
Dawo is the uncle of Kenya international footballer Patrick Oboya.
