= Ghana at the Africa Cup of Nations =

Ghana the city of Africa

Ghana is one of Africa's major forces in the Africa Cup of Nations. Ghana made its debut in 1963, and quickly emerged as a powerful team in the tournament and went on to win the tournament again in 1965, 1978 and in 1982, which was the last tournament to date Ghana has won.

== Overall record ==
The Black Stars of Ghana have won the Africa Cup of Nations four times: in 1963, 1965, 1978, and 1982, bettered only by Cameroon and Egypt. As the first winner of three AFCON tournaments, Ghana obtained the right to permanently hold the trophy in 1978.

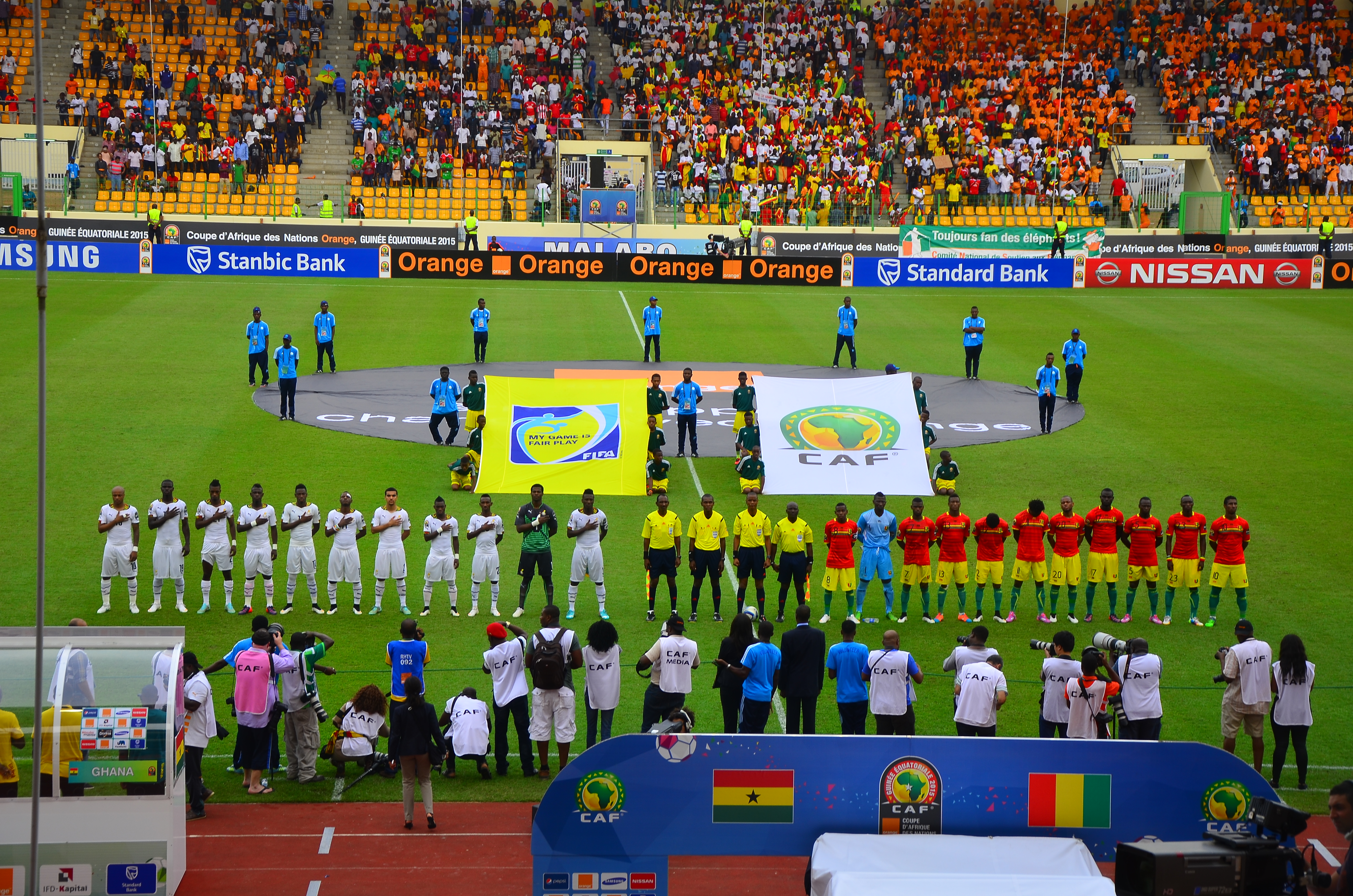
AFCON 2015 match with Guinea

Africa Cup of Nations record
Year	Round	Position	Pld	W	D*	L	GF	GA
(Sudan) 1957	Not affiliated to CAF							
(United Arab Republic) 1959	Not affiliated to CAF							
(Ethiopia) 1962	Did not qualify							
(Ghana) 1963	Champions	1st	3	2	1	0	6	1
(Tunisia) 1965	Champions	1st	3	3	0	0	12	5
(Ethiopia) 1968	Runners-up	2nd	5	3	1	1	11	8
(Sudan) 1970	Runners-up	2nd	5	2	2	1	6	4
(Cameroon) 1972	Did not qualify							
(Egypt) 1974	Did not qualify							
(Ethiopia) 1976	Did not qualify							
(Ghana) 1978	Champions	1st	5	4	1	0	9	2
(Nigeria) 1980	Group stage	5th	3	1	1	1	1	1
(Libya) 1982	Champions	1st	5	2	3	0	7	5
(Ivory Coast) 1984	Group stage	6th	3	1	0	2	2	4
(Egypt) 1986	Did not qualify							
(Morocco) 1988	Did not qualify							
(Algeria) 1990	Did not qualify							
(Senegal) 1992	Runners-up	2nd	5	4	1	0	6	2
(Tunisia) 1994	Quarter-finals	5th	3	2	0	1	3	2
(South Africa) 1996	Fourth place	4th	6	4	0	2	7	5
(Burkina Faso) 1998	Group stage	11th	3	1	0	2	3	3
(Ghana) (Nigeria) 2000	Quarter-finals	8th	4	1	1	2	3	4
(Mali) 2002	Quarter-finals	7th	4	1	2	1	2	2
(Tunisia) 2004	Did not qualify							
(Egypt) 2006	Group stage	10th	3	1	0	2	2	3
(Ghana) 2008	Third place	3rd	6	5	0	1	11	5
(Angola) 2010	Runners-up	2nd	5	3	0	2	4	4
(Gabon) (Equatorial Guinea) 2012	Fourth place	4th	6	3	1	2	6	5
(South Africa) 2013	Fourth place	4th	6	3	2	1	10	6
(Equatorial Guinea) 2015	Runners-up	2nd	6	4	1	1	10	3
(Gabon) 2017	Fourth place	4th	6	3	0	3	4	5
(Egypt) 2019	Round of 16	12th	4	1	3	0	5	3
(Cameroon) 2021	Group stage	19th	3	0	1	2	3	5
(Ivory Coast) 2023	Group stage	17th	3	0	2	1	5	6
(Morocco) 2025	Did not qualify							
(Kenya) (Tanzania) (Uganda) 2027	To be determined							
Total	4 Titles	24/35	105	54	23	28	138	93

*Denotes place was determined via penalty shoot-out.

== Participation history ==
=== Ghana at the 1963 African Cup of Nations ===
Group A

Team	Pld	W	D	L	GF	GA	GD	Pts
Ghana	2	1	1	0	3	1	+2	3
Ethiopia	2	1	0	1	4	4	0	2
Tunisia	2	0	1	1	3	5	−2	1

24 November 1963

Ghana	1–1	Tunisia
Mfum 9'		Jedidi 36'

Accra Sports Stadium, Accra

26 November 1963

Ghana	2–0	Ethiopia
Acquah

Accra Sports Stadium, Accra

28 November 1963

Ethiopia	4–2	Tunisia
Worku; Tekle; Tesfaye		Chetali 15'; Jedidi 67'

Accra Sports Stadium, Accra

Final

1 December 1963

Ghana	3–0	Sudan
Aggrey-Fynn 62' (pen.); Acquah 72', 82'

Accra Sports Stadium, Accra
Referee: Hédi Ben Abdelkader (Tunisia)

=== Ghana at the 1965 African Cup of Nations ===
Group B

Team	Pld	W	D	L	GF	GA	GD	Pts
Ghana	2	2	0	0	9	3	+6	4
Ivory Coast	2	1	0	1	4	4	0	2
Congo-Léopoldville	2	0	0	2	2	8	−6	0

12 November 1965

Ghana	5–2	Congo-Léopoldville
Kofi 13'; Acheampong 18', 59'; Attuquayefio 84', 89'		Kalala Mukendi 43', 45' (pen.)

Stade Bou Ali Lahouar, Sousse

14 November 1965

Ivory Coast	3–0	Congo-Léopoldville
Manglé 14', 59', 80'

Stade Taïeb Mhiri, Sfax

19 November 1965

Ghana	4–1	Ivory Coast
Acheampong 20'; Nti 43'; Lutterodt 52'; Kofi 70'		Bléziri 66'

Stade Ahmed Bsiri, Bizerte

Final

21 November 1965

Ghana	3–2 (a.e.t.)	Tunisia
Odoi 37', 96'; Kofi 79'		Chetali 47'; Chaïbi 67'

Stade Chedli Zouiten, Tunis
Attendance: 16,000
Referee: Abdelaziz Chekaïmi (Algeria)

=== Ghana at the 1968 African Cup of Nations ===
Group B

Team	Pld	W	D	L	GF	GA	GD	Pts
Ghana	3	2	1	0	7	4	+3	5
Congo-Kinshasa	3	2	0	1	6	3	+3	4
Senegal	3	1	1	1	5	5	0	3
Congo-Brazzaville	3	0	0	3	2	8	−6	0

12 January 1968

Ghana	2–2	Senegal
Kofi 63'; Mfum 87'		Diongue 10'; Diop 65'

Cicero Stadium, Asmara
Attendance: 3,000
Referee: El-Attar (Egypt)
12 January 1968

Congo-Kinshasa	3–0	Congo-Brazzaville
Muwawa 19'; Kabamba 27' (pen.), 51'

Cicero Stadium, Asmara
Attendance: 4,000
Referee: Khelifi (Algeria)

14 January 1968

Senegal	2–1	Congo-Brazzaville
Diop 27'; Diouck 86'		Foutika 31'

Cicero Stadium, Asmara
Attendance: 3,000
Referee: Rajab (Uganda)
14 January 1968

Ghana	2–1	Congo-Kinshasa
Kofi 17' (pen.); Mfum 84'		Mokili 42'

Cicero Stadium, Asmara
Attendance: 3,000
Referee: Boua (Ivory Coast)

16 January 1968

Congo-Kinshasa	2–1	Senegal
Kidumu; Tshimanga (pen.)		Diouck

Cicero Stadium, Asmara
Attendance: 3,000
Referee: Tarekegn (Ethiopia)
16 January 1968

Ghana	3–1	Congo-Brazzaville
Kofi; Mfum		M'Bono

Cicero Stadium, Asmara
Attendance: 3,000
Referee: Awanda (Kenya)

Semi-final

19 January 1968

Ghana	4–3	Ivory Coast
Mfum; Sunday; Odoi	Report	Pokou; Konan (pen.)

Cicero Stadium, Asmara
Attendance: 5,000
Referee: El Attar (Egypt)

Final

21 January 1968

Congo-Kinshasa	1–0	Ghana
Kalala Mukendi 66'

Hailé Sélassié Stadium, Addis Ababa
Attendance: 25,000
Referee: El-Attar (Egypt)

=== Ghana at the 1970 African Cup of Nations ===
Group B

Team	Pld	W	D	L	GF	GA	GD	Pts
United Arab Rep.	3	2	1	0	6	2	+4	5
Ghana	3	1	2	0	4	2	+2	4
Guinea	3	0	2	1	4	7	−3	2
Congo-Kinshasa	3	0	1	2	2	5	−3	1

7 February 1970

Ghana	2–0	Congo-Kinshasa
Owusu 29', 32'

Wad Madani Stadium, Wad Medani
Attendance: 7,525
Referee: Obeid (Sudan)
7 February 1970

United Arab Rep.	4–1	Guinea
Abo Greisha 5', 10'; El-Shazly 73' (pen.); Basry 66'		Soumah 25' (pen.)

Wad Madani Stadium, Wad Medani
Attendance: 7,525
Referee: Gebreyesus (Ethiopia)

9 February 1970

Congo-Kinshasa	2–2	Guinea
Kalonzo 70'; Mungamuni 72'		Petit Sory 5'; Soumah 55' (pen.)

Wad Madani Stadium, Wad Medani
Attendance: 3,342
Referee: Koudou (Ivory Coast)
9 February 1970

United Arab Rep.	1–1	Ghana
Bazooka 70'		Sunday 60'

Wad Madani Stadium, Wad Medani
Attendance: 3,342
Referee: Kandem (Cameroon)

11 February 1970

Guinea	1–1	Ghana
Thiam 10'		Owusu 50'

Wad Madani Stadium, Wad Medani
Attendance: 3,927
Referee: Khelifi (Algeria)
11 February 1970

United Arab Rep.	1–0	Congo-Kinshasa
Abo Greisha 71'

Wad Madani Stadium, Wad Medani
Attendance: 3,927
Referee: Simfukwe (Zimbabwe)

Semifinal

14 February 1970

Ivory Coast	1–2 (a.e.t.)	Ghana
Losseni 78'		Sunday 21'; Jabir 100'

Municipal Stadium, Khartoum
Attendance: 12,350

Final

16 February 1970

Sudan	1–0	Ghana
Hasabu El-Sagheer 12'

Municipal Stadium, Khartoum
Attendance: 12,187
Referee: Gebreyesus Tesfaye (Ethiopia)

=== Ghana at the 1978 African Cup of Nations ===
Group A

Team	Pld	W	D	L	GF	GA	GD	Pts
Ghana	3	2	1	0	6	2	+4	5
Nigeria	3	1	2	0	5	3	+2	4
Zambia	3	1	1	1	3	2	+1	3
Upper Volta	3	0	0	3	2	9	−7	0

5 March 1978

Ghana	2–1	Zambia
Afriyie 21'; Abdul Razak 55'	Report	Kapita 8'

Accra Sports Stadium, Accra
Attendance: 50,000
Referee: Suleiman El Naim (Sudan)

5 March 1978

Nigeria	4–2	Upper Volta
Chukwu 17'; Amiesimaka 31'; Odegbami 44', 82'	Report	Hien 50'; Koïta 52'

Accra Sports Stadium, Accra
Attendance: 50,000
Referee: ... Sylla

8 March 1978

Zambia	2–0	Upper Volta
P. Phiri 20'; B. Phiri 88'	Report

Accra Sports Stadium, Accra
Attendance: 60,000
Referee: C. Monty

8 March 1978

Nigeria	1–1	Ghana
Odegbami 33'		Klutse 76'

Accra Sports Stadium, Accra
Attendance: 60,000

10 March 1978

Zambia	0–0	Nigeria
	Report

Accra Sports Stadium, Accra
Attendance: 25,000

10 March 1978

Ghana	3–0	Upper Volta
Alhassan 3', 59'; Polo 52'	Report

Accra Sports Stadium, Accra
Attendance: 25,000
Referee: Pierre Mutombo (Zaïre)

Semi-final

14 March 1978

Ghana	1–0	Tunisia
Abdul Razak 57'	Report

Accra Sports Stadium, Accra
Attendance: 10,000
Referee: Youssef El Ghoul (Libya)

Final

16 March 1978

Ghana	2–0	Uganda
Afriyie 38', 64'	Report

Accra Sports Stadium, Accra
Attendance: 40,000
Referee: Youssef El Ghoul (Libya)

=== Ghana at the 1980 African Cup of Nations ===
Group B

Team	Pld	W	D	L	GF	GA	GD	Pts
Algeria	3	2	1	0	4	2	+2	5
Morocco	3	1	1	1	2	2	0	3
Ghana	3	1	1	1	1	1	0	3
Guinea	3	0	1	2	3	5	−2	1

9 March 1980

Ghana	0–0	Algeria
	Report

Liberty Stadium, Ibadan
Attendance: 40,000
Referee: Youssef El Ghoul (Libya)
9 March 1980

Morocco	1–1	Guinea
Mustapha 7'	Report	M. Camara 8'

Liberty Stadium, Ibadan
Attendance: 40,000
Referee: Paul Preira (Senegal)

13 March 1980

Algeria	1–0	Morocco
Belloumi 90+3'	Report

Liberty Stadium, Ibadan
Attendance: 20,000
Referee: Ali Dridi (Tunisia)
13 March 1980

Ghana	1–0	Guinea
Klutse 69'	Report

Liberty Stadium, Ibadan
Attendance: 20,000
Referee: Ngesa Gabriel Odengo (Kenya)

16 March 1980

Algeria	3–2	Guinea
Bensaoula 12', 49'; Belloumi 37'	Report	Diawara 82'; Bangoura 90+1'

Liberty Stadium, Ibadan
Attendance: 20,000
Referee: Idrissa Traoré (Mali)
16 March 1980

Morocco	1–0	Ghana
Labied 44'	Report

Liberty Stadium, Ibadan
Attendance: 20,000
Referee: Dodou N'Jie (Gambia)

=== Ghana at the 1982 African Cup of Nations ===
Group A

Team	Pld	W	D	L	GF	GA	GD	Pts
Libya	3	1	2	0	4	2	+2	4
Ghana	3	1	2	0	3	2	+1	4
Cameroon	3	0	3	0	1	1	0	3
Tunisia	3	0	1	2	1	4	−3	1

5 March 1982

Libya	2–2	Ghana
Jaranah 58'; Al-Issawi 76'	Report	Alhassan 28'; Opoku Nti 89'

11 June Stadium, Tripoli
Attendance: 45,200
Referee: Sohan Ramlochun (Mauritius)

5 March 1982

Cameroon	1–1	Tunisia
M'Bida 61'	Report	Gabsi 60'

11 June Stadium, Tripoli
Attendance: 45,000
Referee: Bakary Sarr (Senegal)

9 March 1982

Cameroon	0–0	Ghana
	Report

11 June Stadium, Tripoli
Attendance: 40,000
Referee: Mohamed Larache (Morocco)

9 March 1982

Libya	2–0	Tunisia
Seddik 42' (o.g.); Al-Bor'osi 89'	Report

11 June Stadium, Tripoli
Attendance: 40,000
Referee: Kambaji Kabongo (Zaire)

12 March 1982

Ghana	1–0	Tunisia
John Ebow Essien 28'	Report

11 June Stadium, Tripoli
Attendance: 40,000
Referee: Idrissa Traoré (Mali)

12 March 1982

Libya	0–0	Cameroon
	Report

11 June Stadium, Tripoli
Attendance: 40,000
Referee: Babacar Fall (Senegal)

Semifinal

16 March 1982

Ghana	3–2 (a.e.t.)	Algeria
Alhassan 4', 103'; Opoku Nti 90'	Report	Zidane 29'; Assad 62'

28 March Stadium, Benghazi
Attendance: 5,000
Referee: Bester Kalombo (Malawi)

Final

19 March 1982

Ghana	1–1	Libya
Alhassan 35'	Report	Al-Beshari 70'
Penalties
Lamptey (penalty scored); Alhassan (penalty scored); Paha (penalty scored); Asaase (penalty scored); Abbrey (penalty scored); Mensah (penalty missed); Quarshie (penalty scored); Afriyie (penalty scored)	7–6	(penalty scored) Al-Beshari; (penalty scored) Sola; (penalty scored) Al-Ajeli; (penalty scored) Ben-Suleiman; (penalty scored) Al-Farjani; (penalty missed) Ghonaïm; (penalty scored) Jaranah; (penalty missed) Zeiyu

11 June Stadium, Tripoli
Attendance: 50,000
Referee: Sohan Ramlochun (Mauritius)

=== Ghana at the 1984 African Cup of Nations ===
Group B

Team	Pld	W	D	L	GF	GA	GD	Pts
Algeria	3	2	1	0	5	0	+5	5
Nigeria	3	1	2	0	4	3	+1	4
Ghana	3	1	0	2	2	4	−2	2
Malawi	3	0	1	2	2	6	−4	1

5 March 1984

Ghana	1–2	Nigeria
Opoku N'ti 19'	Report	Nwosu 13'; Ehilegbu 31'

Stade Bouaké, Bouaké
Attendance: 10,000
Referee: Dodou N'Jie (Gambia)

5 March 1984

Algeria	3–0	Malawi
Bouiche 29'; Belloumi 36'; Fergani 38'	Report

Stade Bouaké, Bouaké
Attendance: 10,000
Referee: Bakary Sarr (Senegal)

8 March 1984

Malawi	2–2	Nigeria
Waya 7' (pen.); Msiya 35'	Report	Temile 39', 41'

Stade Bouaké, Bouaké
Attendance: 15,000
Referee: Hassan Abdel Hafiz (Sudan)

8 March 1984

Algeria	2–0	Ghana
Menad 75'; Bensaoula 85'	Report

Stade Bouaké, Bouaké
Attendance: 15,000
Referee: Mohamed Bahhou (Morocco)

11 March 1984

Algeria	0–0	Nigeria
	Report

Stade Bouaké, Bouaké
Attendance: 3,000
Referee: Karim Camara (Guinea)

11 March 1984

Ghana	1–0	Malawi
Amphadu 32'	Report

Stade Bouaké, Bouaké
Attendance: 3,000
Referee: Salem Mohamed Adal (Libya)

=== Ghana at the 1992 African Cup of Nations ===
Group D

Team	Pld	W	D	L	GF	GA	GD	Pts
Ghana	2	2	0	0	2	0	+2	4
Zambia	2	1	0	1	1	1	0	2
Egypt	2	0	0	2	0	2	−2	0

January 15, 1992

Ghana	1–0	Zambia
Abedi Pele 64'

Stade Aline Sitoe Diatta, Ziguinchor
Attendance: 5,000

January 17, 1992

Ghana	1–0	Egypt
Yeboah 89'

Stade Aline Sitoe Diatta, Ziguinchor
Attendance: 5,000

Quarter-final

January 20, 1992

Ghana	2–1	Congo
Yeboah 29'; Abedi Pele 57'		Tchibota 52'

Stade de l'Amitié, Dakar
Attendance: 15,000
Referee: Ibrahim Faye (Gambia)

Semi-final

January 23, 1992

Ghana	2–1	Nigeria
Abedi Pele 43'; Prince Polley 54'	Report	Adepoju 11'

Stade de l'Amitié, Dakar
Attendance: 30,000
Referee: Neji Jouini (Tunisia)

Final

January 26, 1992

Ivory Coast	0–0 (a.e.t.)	Ghana
	Report
Penalties
Aka (penalty scored); Hobou (penalty scored); Sekana (penalty scored); M. Traoré (penalty scored); Tiéhi (penalty missed); Gadji-Celi (penalty scored); Kouadio (penalty scored); Abouo (penalty scored); Maguy (penalty scored); Sie (penalty scored); Gouamené (penalty scored); Aka (penalty scored)	11–10	(penalty scored) Baffoe; (penalty scored) Lamptey; (penalty scored) Naawu; (penalty missed) Asare; (penalty scored) Yeboah; (penalty scored) Manso; (penalty scored) Armah; (penalty scored) Abroah; (penalty scored) Ampeah; (penalty scored) Opoku; (penalty scored) Ansah; (penalty missed) Baffoe

Stade de l'Amitié, Dakar
Attendance: 47,500
Referee: Badara Sène (Senegal)

The penalty shootout was significant in that it was the first in the final of a major international tournament that every player on the pitch took a penalty.

=== Ghana at the 1994 African Cup of Nations ===
Group D

Team	Pld	W	D	L	GF	GA	GD	Pts
Ghana	2	2	0	0	2	0	+2	4
Senegal	2	1	0	1	2	2	0	2
Guinea	2	0	0	2	1	3	−2	0

27 March 1994

Ghana	1–0	Guinea
Akunnor 87'

Stade Olympique de Sousse, Sousse
Attendance: 10,000
Referee: Petros Mathabela (South Africa)

29 March 1994

Senegal	2–1	Guinea
Gueye 46' (pen.); Tendeng 50'		A. Camara 44'

Stade Olympique de Sousse, Sousse
Attendance: 6,000
Referee: Hussein Ali Moussa (Egypt)

31 March 1994

Ghana	1–0	Senegal
Polley 42'

Stade Olympique de Sousse, Sousse
Attendance: 6,000
Referee: Ali Bujsaim (United Arab Emirates)

Quarterfinal

3 April 1994

Ghana	1–2	Ivory Coast
Akonnor 77'		Tiéhi 30'; A. Traoré 81'

Stade Olympique de Sousse, Sousse
Attendance: 8,000
Referee: Ali Bujsaim (United Arab Emirates)

=== Ghana at the 1996 African Cup of Nations ===
Group D

Team	Pld	W	D	L	GF	GA	GD	Pts
Ghana	3	3	0	0	6	1	+5	9
Tunisia	3	1	1	1	5	4	+1	4
Ivory Coast	3	1	0	2	2	5	−3	3
Mozambique	3	0	1	2	1	4	−3	1

14 January 1996

Ghana	2–0	Ivory Coast
Yeboah 20'; Pelé 70'

EPRU Stadium, Port Elizabeth
Attendance: 8,000
Referee: Masayoshi Okada (Japan)

16 January 1996

Tunisia	1–1	Mozambique
Berkhissa 24'		Bucuane 4'

EPRU Stadium, Port Elizabeth
Attendance: 1,000
Referee: Charles Masembe (Uganda)

19 January 1996

Ghana	2–1	Tunisia
Pelé 50'; Akonnor 77'		Ben Younes 72'

EPRU Stadium, Port Elizabeth
Attendance: 1,000
Referee: Petros Mathabela (South Africa)

21 January 1996

Ivory Coast	1–0	Mozambique
Tiéhi 32'

EPRU Stadium, Port Elizabeth
Attendance: 500
Referee: Gamal Al-Ghandour (Egypt)

25 January 1996

Tunisia	3–1	Ivory Coast
Ben Younes 32', 38'; Ben Hassen 48'		M. Traoré 84'

EPRU Stadium, Port Elizabeth
Attendance: 1,000
Referee: Sidi Bekaye Magassa (Mali)

25 January 1996

Ghana	2–0	Mozambique
Pelé 42'; Aboagye 68'

Free State Stadium, Bloemfontein
Attendance: 3,500
Referee: Ali Bujsaim (United Arab Emirates)

Quarterfinal

28 January 1996

Ghana	1–0	Zaire
Yeboah 22'	Report

EPRU Stadium, Port Elizabeth
Attendance: 8,000
Referee: Sidi Bekaye Magassa (Mali)

Semifinal

31 January 1996

South Africa	3–0	Ghana
Moshoeu 22', 87'; Bartlett 46'

FNB Stadium, Johannesburg
Attendance: 75,000
Referee: Gamal Al-Ghandour (Egypt)

Third place match

3 February 1996

Ghana	0–1	Zambia
		J. Bwalya 51'

FNB Stadium, Johannesburg
Attendance: 80,000
Referee: Omer Yengo (Congo)

=== Ghana at the 1998 African Cup of Nations ===
Group B

Team	Pld	W	D	L	GF	GA	GD	Pts
Tunisia	3	2	0	1	5	4	+1	6
DR Congo	3	2	0	1	4	3	+1	6
Ghana	3	1	0	2	3	3	0	3
Togo	3	1	0	2	4	6	−2	3

9 February 1998
16:00

DR Congo	2–1	Togo
Tondelua 57' (pen.), 73' (pen.)		Tchangai 90'

Stade Municipal, Ouagadougou
Attendance: 4,000
Referee: Said Belqola (Morocco)

9 February 1998
20:30

Ghana	2–0	Tunisia
Nyarko 8'; Gargo 90'

Stade du 4 Août, Ouagadougou
Attendance: 12,000
Referee: Ian McLeod (South Africa)

12 February 1998
16:00

Tunisia	2–1	DR Congo
Ben Slimane 31'; Tlemcani 76'		Kimoto 36'

Stade Municipal, Ouagadougou
Attendance: 1,000
Referee: Kine Tibebu (Ethiopia)

12 February 1998
20:30

Togo	2–1	Ghana
Doté 26'; Kader 90'		Johnson 83' (pen.)

Stade du 4 Août, Ouagadougou
Attendance: 3,000
Referee: Omer Yengo (Congo)

16 February 1998
17:00

DR Congo	1–0	Ghana
Kisombe 77'

Stade du 4 Août, Ouagadougou
Attendance: 3,000
Referee: Young-Joo Kim (South Korea)

16 February 1998
17:00

Tunisia	3–1	Togo
Tlemcani 9'; Ben Slimane 12'; Gabsi 80'		Assignon 4' (pen.)

Stade Municipal, Ouagadougou
Attendance: 800
Referee: Pierre Mounguegui (Gabon)

=== Ghana at the 2000 African Cup of Nations ===
Group A

Group A of the 2000 AFCON remains as the only group stage that all four teams to achieve four points out of three matches.

Team	Pld	W	D	L	GF	GA	GD	Pts
Cameroon	3	1	1	1	4	2	+2	4
Ghana	3	1	1	1	3	3	0	4
Ivory Coast	3	1	1	1	3	4	−1	4
Togo	3	1	1	1	2	3	−1	4

22 January 2000
16:00

Ghana	1–1	Cameroon
Ayew 57'		Foé 19'

Accra Sports Stadium, Accra
Attendance: 45,000
Referee: Ali Bujsaim (United Arab Emirates)

24 January 2000
16:00

Ivory Coast	1–1	Togo
Guel 38' (pen.)		Ouadja 19'

Accra Sports Stadium, Accra
Attendance: 13,000
Referee: Tessema Hailemalak (Ethiopia)

27 January 2000
16:00

Ghana	2–0	Togo
Ayew 28'; Addo 37'

Accra Sports Stadium, Accra
Attendance: 30,000
Referee: Abderrahim Al-Arjoune (Morocco)

28 January 2000
19:45

Cameroon	3–0	Ivory Coast
Kalla 29'; Eto'o 45'; M'Boma 90'

Accra Sports Stadium, Accra
Attendance: 5,000
Referee: Mourad Daami (Tunisia)

31 January 2000
16:00

Ghana	0–2	Ivory Coast
		Kalou 45'; Sie 84'

Accra Sports Stadium, Accra
Attendance: 40,000
Referee: Gamal Al-Ghandour (Egypt)

31 January 2000
16:00

Cameroon	0–1	Togo
		Tchangai 18'

Baba Yara Stadium, Kumasi
Attendance: 2,000
Referee: Olufunmi Olaniyan (Nigeria)

Quarterfinal

6 February 2000
19:30

South Africa	1–0	Ghana
Nomvethe 42'

Kumasi Sports Stadium, Kumasi
Attendance: 40,000
Referee: Mourad Daami (Tunisia)

=== Ghana at the 2002 African Cup of Nations ===
Group B

Team	Pld	W	D	L	GF	GA	GD	Pts
South Africa	3	1	2	0	3	1	+2	5
Ghana	3	1	2	0	2	1	+1	5
Morocco	3	1	1	1	3	4	−1	4
Burkina Faso	3	0	1	2	2	4	−2	1

20 January 2002
19:30

South Africa	0–0	Burkina Faso

Stade Amare Daou, Ségou
Attendance: 12,000
Referee: Falla Ndoye (Senegal)

21 January 2002
16:00

Morocco	0–0	Ghana

Stade Amare Daou, Ségou
Attendance: 4,000
Referee: Domenico Messina (Italy)

24 January 2002
16:00

South Africa	0–0	Ghana

Stade Amare Daou, Ségou
Attendance: 5,000
Referee: Mourad Daami (Tunisia)

26 January 2002
15:30

Burkina Faso	1–2	Morocco
Dagano 58'		Zerouali 23', 85'

Stade Amare Daou, Ségou
Attendance: 6,000
Referee: Lim Kee Chong (Mauritius)

30 January 2002
16:00

South Africa	3–1	Morocco
Zuma 42'; Mngomeni 48'; Nomvethe 51'		Benmahmoud 77' (pen.)

Stade Amare Daou, Ségou
Attendance: 3,000
Referee: Gamal Al-Ghandour (Egypt)

30 January 2002
16:00

Burkina Faso	1–2	Ghana
A.Touré 81'		Boakye 90', 90+2'

Stade Barema Bocoum, Mopti
Attendance: 15,000
Referee: Chukwudi Chukwujekwu (Nigeria)

Quarterfinal

3 February 2002
19:00

Nigeria	1–0	Ghana
Lawal 80'

Stade du 26 Mars, Bamako
Attendance: 25,000
Referee: Mohamed Guezzaz (Morocco)

=== Ghana at the 2006 African Cup of Nations ===
Group D

Team	Pld	W	D	L	GF	GA	GD	Pts
Nigeria	3	3	0	0	5	1	+4	9
Senegal	3	1	0	2	3	3	0	3
Ghana	3	1	0	2	2	3	−1	3
Zimbabwe	3	1	0	2	2	5	−3	3

23 January 2006
17:15

Nigeria	1–0	Ghana
Taiwo 85'

Port Said Stadium, Port Said
Attendance: 18,000
Referee: Essam Abd El Fatah (Egypt)

23 January 2006
20:00

Zimbabwe	0–2	Senegal
		H. Camara 59'; Ba 80'

Port Said Stadium, Port Said
Attendance: 15,000
Referee: Khalid Abdel Rahman (Sudan)

27 January 2006
17:15

Ghana	1–0	Senegal
Amoah 13'

Port Said Stadium, Port Said
Attendance: 18,000
Referee: Abderrahim Al-Arjoune (Morocco)

27 January 2006
20:00

Nigeria	2–0	Zimbabwe
Obodo 57'; Mikel 60'

Port Said Stadium, Port Said
Attendance: 10,000
Referee: Koman Coulibaly (Mali)

31 January 2006
19:00

Nigeria	2–1	Senegal
Martins 79', 88'		S. Camara 58'

Port Said Stadium, Port Said
Attendance: 17,000
Referee: Jérôme Damon (South Africa)

31 January 2006
19:00

Ghana	1–2	Zimbabwe
Adamu 90+2'		Issah 60' (o.g.); Benjani 68'

Ismailia Stadium, Ismailia
Attendance: 18,500
Referee: René Louzaya (Congo)

=== Ghana at the 2008 African Cup of Nations ===
Group A

Team	Pld	W	D	L	GF	GA	GD	Pts	Qualification
Ghana	3	3	0	0	5	1	+4	9	Advanced to the quarter-finals
Guinea	3	1	1	1	5	5	0	4	Advanced to the quarter-finals
Morocco	3	1	0	2	7	6	+1	3	
Namibia	3	0	1	2	2	7	−5	1	

20 January 2008
17:00

Ghana	2–1	Guinea
A. Gyan 55' (pen.); Muntari 90'	Report	Kalabane 65'

Ohene Djan Stadium, Accra
Attendance: 35,000
Referee: Eddy Maillet (Seychelles)

21 January 2008
15:00

Namibia	1–5	Morocco
Brendell 24'	Report	Alloudi 1', 5', 28'; Sektioui 40' (pen.); Zerka 74'

Ohene Djan Stadium, Accra
Attendance: 2,000
Referee: Divine Evehe (Cameroon)

24 January 2008
17:00

Guinea	3–2	Morocco
Feindouno 11', 63' (pen.); Bangoura 59'	Report	Aboucherouane 60'; Ouaddou 90'

Ohene Djan Stadium, Accra
Attendance: 15,000
Referee: Jerome Damon (South Africa)

24 January 2008
19:30

Ghana	1–0	Namibia
Agogo 41'	Report

Ohene Djan Stadium, Accra
Attendance: 40,000
Referee: Kacem Bennaceur (Tunisia)

28 January 2008
17:00

Ghana	2–0	Morocco
Essien 26'; Muntari 45'	Report

Ohene Djan Stadium, Accra
Attendance: 40,000
Referee: Modou Sowe (Gambia)

28 January 2008
17:00

Guinea	1–1	Namibia
Youla 62'	Report	Brendell 80'

Sekondi-Takoradi Stadium, Sekondi-Takoradi
Attendance: 1,000
Referee: Muhmed Ssegonga (Uganda)

Quarter-final

3 February 2008
17:00

Ghana	2–1	Nigeria
Essien 45+2'; Agogo 83'	Report	Yakubu 35' (pen.)

Ohene Djan Stadium, Accra
Attendance: 45,000
Referee: Mohamed Benouza (Algeria)

Semi-finals

7 February 2008
17:00

Ghana	0–1	Cameroon
	Report	N'Kong 72'

Ohene Djan Stadium, Accra
Attendance: 40,000
Referee: Abderahim El Arjoune (Morocco)

Third place match

9 February 2008
17:00

Ghana	4–2	Ivory Coast
Muntari 10'; Owusu-Abeyie 70'; Agogo 80'; Draman 84'	Report	Sanogo 24', 32'

Baba Yara Stadium, Kumasi
Attendance: 40,000
Referee: Jerome Damon (South Africa)

=== Ghana at the 2010 African Cup of Nations ===
Group B

Pos	Team	Pld	W	D	L	GF	GA	GD	Pts	Qualification
1	Ivory Coast	2	1	1	0	3	1	+2	4	Advance to knockout stage
2	Ghana	2	1	0	1	2	3	−1	3	Advance to knockout stage
3	Burkina Faso	2	0	1	1	0	1	−1	1	
4	Togo (D)	0	0	0	0	0	0	0	0 (Note: Togo withdrew from the tournament due to the attack on their team bus while traveling to their opening match against Ghana, thus they were officially disqualified. Group B became a three-team group.)	

Source: CAF
(D) Disqualified
Notes:
11 January 2010
17:00

Ivory Coast	0–0	Burkina Faso
	Report

Estádio Nacional do Chiazi, Cabinda
Attendance: 5,000
Referee: Kacem Bennaceur (Tunisia)
11 January 2010
19:30

Ghana	Cancelled	Togo

Estádio do Chiazi, Cabinda
15 January 2010
17:00

Burkina Faso	Cancelled	Togo

Estádio do Chiazi, Cabinda
15 January 2010
19:30

Ivory Coast	3–1	Ghana
Gervinho 23'; Tiéné 66'; Drogba 90'	Report	Gyan 90+3' (pen.)

Estádio Nacional do Chiazi, Cabinda
Attendance: 23,000
Referee: Jerome Damon (South Africa)
19 January 2010
17:00

Burkina Faso	0–1	Ghana
	Report	A. Ayew 30'

Estádio 11 de Novembro, Luanda
Attendance: 8,000
Referee: Eddy Maillet (Seychelles)
19 January 2010
17:00

Ivory Coast	Cancelled	Togo

Estádio do Chiazi, Cabinda
11 January 2010
17:00

Ivory Coast	0–0	Burkina Faso
	Report

Estádio do Chiazi, Cabinda
Attendance: 5,000
Referee: Kacem Bennaceur (Tunisia)

11 January 2010
19:30

Ghana	Cancelled	Togo

Estádio do Chiazi, Cabinda

15 January 2010
17:00

Burkina Faso	Cancelled	Togo

Estádio do Chiazi, Cabinda

15 January 2010
19:30

Ivory Coast	3–1	Ghana
Gervinho 23'; Tiéné 66'; Drogba 90'	Report	Gyan 90+3' (pen.)

Estádio do Chiazi, Cabinda
Attendance: 23,000
Referee: Jerome Damon (South Africa)

19 January 2010
17:00

Burkina Faso	0–1	Ghana
	Report	A. Ayew 30'

Estádio 11 de Novembro, Luanda
Attendance: 8,000
Referee: Eddy Maillet (Seychelles)

19 January 2010
17:00

Ivory Coast	Cancelled	Togo

Estádio do Chiazi, Cabinda

Quarter-final

24 January 2010
17:00

Angola	0–1	Ghana
	Report	Gyan 15'

Estádio 11 de Novembro, Luanda
Attendance: 50,000
Referee: Mohamed Benouza (Algeria)

Semi-final

28 January 2010
16:00

Ghana	1–0	Nigeria
Gyan 21'	Report

Estádio 11 de Novembro, Luanda
Attendance: 7,500
Referee: Daniel Bennett (South Africa)

Final

31 January 2010
17:00

Ghana	0–1	Egypt
	Report	Gedo 85'

Estádio 11 de Novembro, Luanda
Attendance: 45,000
Referee: Koman Coulibaly (Mali)

=== Ghana at the 2012 African Cup of Nations ===
Group D

Pos	Team	Pld	W	D	L	GF	GA	GD	Pts	Qualification
1	Ghana	3	2	1	0	4	1	+3	7	Advance to knockout stage
2	Mali	3	2	0	1	3	3	0	6	Advance to knockout stage
3	Guinea	3	1	1	1	7	3	+4	4	
4	Botswana	3	0	0	3	2	9	−7	0	

Source: CAF
24 January 2012
17:00

Ghana	1–0	Botswana
John Mensah 25'	Report

Stade de Franceville, Franceville
Attendance: 5,000
Referee: Badara Diatta (Senegal)
24 January 2012
20:00

Mali	1–0	Guinea
B. Traoré 30'	Report

Stade de Franceville, Franceville
Attendance: 10,000
Referee: Slim Jedidi (Tunisia)
28 January 2012
17:00

Botswana	1–6	Guinea
Selolwane 23' (pen.)	Report	S. Diallo 15', 27'; A. R. Camara 42'; Traoré 45'; M. Bah 83'; Soumah 86'

Stade de Franceville, Franceville
Attendance: 4,000
Referee: Bouchaïb El Ahrach (Morocco)
28 January 2012
20:00

Ghana	2–0	Mali
Gyan 64'; A. Ayew 71'	Report

Stade de Franceville, Franceville
Attendance: 7,000
Referee: Djamel Haimoudi (Algeria)
1 February 2012
19:00

Botswana	1–2	Mali
Ngele 50'	Report	Dembélé 56'; Keita 75'

Stade d'Angondjé, Libreville
Attendance: 20,000
Referee: Khalid Abdel Rahman (Sudan)
1 February 2012
19:00

Ghana	1–1	Guinea
Agyemang-Badu 27'	Report	A. R. Camara 45'

Stade de Franceville, Franceville
Attendance: 5,500
Referee: Daniel Bennett (South Africa)

24 January 2012
Ghana	1–0	Botswana	Stade de Franceville, Franceville
Mali	1–0	Guinea	Stade de Franceville, Franceville
28 January 2012
Botswana	1–6	Guinea	Stade de Franceville, Franceville
Ghana	2–0	Mali	Stade de Franceville, Franceville
1 February 2012
Botswana	1–2	Mali	Stade d'Angondjé, Libreville
Ghana	1–1	Guinea	Stade de Franceville, Franceville

Quarterfinal

5 February 2012
20:00

Ghana	2–1 (a.e.t.)	Tunisia
John Mensah 9'; A. Ayew 100'	Report	Khelifa 41'

Stade de Franceville, Franceville
Attendance: 8,000
Referee: Néant Alioum (Cameroon)

Semifinal

8 February 2012
17:00

Zambia	1–0	Ghana
Mayuka 78'	Report

Estadio de Bata, Bata
Attendance: 12,000
Referee: Mohamed Benouza (Algeria)

Third place match

11 February 2012
20:00

Ghana	0–2	Mali
	Report	Diabaté 23', 80'

Estadio de Malabo, Malabo
Attendance: 15,000
Referee: Gehad Grisha (Egypt)

=== Ghana at the 2013 African Cup of Nations ===
Group B

Pos	Team	Pld	W	D	L	GF	GA	GD	Pts	Qualification
1	Ghana	3	2	1	0	6	2	+4	7	Advance to knockout stage
2	Mali	3	1	1	1	2	2	0	4	Advance to knockout stage
3	DR Congo	3	0	3	0	3	3	0	3	
4	Niger	3	0	1	2	0	4	−4	1	

Source: CAF
20 January 2013
17:00

Ghana	2–2	DR Congo
Agyemang-Badu 40'; Asamoah 49'	Report	Mputu 53'; Mbokani 69' (pen.)

Nelson Mandela Bay Stadium, Port Elizabeth
Attendance: 7,000
Referee: Daniel Bennett (South Africa)
20 January 2013
20:00

Mali	1–0	Niger
Keita 84'	Report

Nelson Mandela Bay Stadium, Port Elizabeth
Attendance: 20,000
Referee: Slim Jedidi (Tunisia)
24 January 2013
17:00

Ghana	1–0	Mali
Wakaso 38' (pen.)	Report

Nelson Mandela Bay Stadium, Port Elizabeth
Attendance: 8,000
Referee: Noumandiez Doué (Ivory Coast)
24 January 2013
20:00

Niger	0–0	DR Congo
	Report

Nelson Mandela Bay Stadium, Port Elizabeth
Attendance: 12,000
Referee: Bouchaïb El Ahrach (Morocco)
28 January 2013
19:00

Niger	0–3	Ghana
	Report	Gyan 6'; Atsu 23'; Boye 49'

Nelson Mandela Bay Stadium, Port Elizabeth
Attendance: 10,000
Referee: Badara Diatta (Senegal)
28 January 2013
19:00

DR Congo	1–1	Mali
Mbokani 3' (pen.)	Report	Mah. Samassa 15'

Moses Mabhida Stadium, Durban
Attendance: 8,000
Referee: Djamel Haimoudi (Algeria)

20 January 2013
Ghana	2–2	DR Congo	Nelson Mandela Bay Stadium, Port Elizabeth
Mali	1–0	Niger	Nelson Mandela Bay Stadium, Port Elizabeth
24 January 2013
Ghana	1–0	Mali	Nelson Mandela Bay Stadium, Port Elizabeth
Niger	0–0	DR Congo	Nelson Mandela Bay Stadium, Port Elizabeth
28 January 2013
Niger	0–3	Ghana	Nelson Mandela Bay Stadium, Port Elizabeth
DR Congo	1–1	Mali	Moses Mabhida Stadium, Durban

Quarter-final

2 February 2013
17:00

Ghana	2–0	Cape Verde
Wakaso 54' (pen.), 90+5'	Report

Nelson Mandela Bay Stadium, Port Elizabeth
Attendance: 8,000
Referee: Rajindraparsad Seechurn (Mauritius)

Semi-final

6 February 2013
20:30

Burkina Faso	1–1 (a.e.t.)	Ghana
Bancé 60'	Report	Wakaso 13' (pen.)
Penalties
B. Koné (penalty scored); H. Traoré (penalty scored); Paul Koulibaly (penalty missed); Bancé (penalty scored)	3–2	(penalty missed) Vorsah; (penalty scored) Atsu; (penalty scored) Afful; (penalty missed) Clottey; (penalty missed) Agyemang-Badu

Mbombela Stadium, Nelspruit
Attendance: 35,000
Referee: Slim Jedidi (Tunisia)

Third place play-off

9 February 2013
20:00

Mali	3–1	Ghana
Mah. Samassa 21'; Keita 48'; S. Diarra 90+4'	Report	Asamoah 82'

Nelson Mandela Bay Stadium, Port Elizabeth
Attendance: 6,000
Referee: Eric Otogo-Castane (Gabon)

=== Ghana at the 2015 African Cup of Nations ===
Group C

Pos	Team	Pld	W	D	L	GF	GA	GD	Pts	Qualification
1	Ghana	3	2	0	1	4	3	+1	6	Advance to knockout stage
2	Algeria	3	2	0	1	5	2	+3	6	Advance to knockout stage
3	Senegal	3	1	1	1	3	4	−1	4	
4	South Africa	3	0	1	2	3	6	−3	1	

Source: CAF
Rules for classification: Tiebreakers
19 January 2015
17:00

Ghana	1–2	Senegal
A. Ayew 14' (pen.)	Report	Diouf 58'; Sow 90+3'

Estadio de Mongomo, Mongomo
Attendance: 13,569
Referee: Bernard Camille (Seychelles)
19 January 2015
20:00

Algeria	3–1	South Africa
Hlatshwayo 67' (o.g.); Ghoulam 72'; Slimani 83'	Report	Phala 51'

Estadio de Mongomo, Mongomo
Attendance: 12,788
Referee: Noumandiez Doué (Ivory Coast)
23 January 2015
17:00

Ghana	1–0	Algeria
Gyan 90+2'	Report

Estadio de Mongomo, Mongomo
Attendance: 12,387
Referee: Koman Coulibaly (Mali)
23 January 2015
20:00

South Africa	1–1	Senegal
Manyisa 47'	Report	Mbodj 60'

Estadio de Mongomo, Mongomo
Attendance: 13,674
Referee: Ali Lemghaifry (Mauritania)
27 January 2015
19:00

South Africa	1–2	Ghana
Masango 17'	Report	Boye 73'; A. Ayew 83'

Estadio de Mongomo, Mongomo
Attendance: 13,670
Referee: Hamada Nampiandraza (Madagascar)
27 January 2015
19:00

Senegal	0–2	Algeria
	Report	Mahrez 11'; Bentaleb 82'

Estadio de Malabo, Malabo
Attendance: 14,549
Referee: Rajindraparsad Seechurn (Mauritius)

19 January 2015
Ghana	1–2	Senegal	Estadio de Mongomo, Mongomo
Algeria	3–1	South Africa	Estadio de Mongomo, Mongomo
23 January 2015
Ghana	1–0	Algeria	Estadio de Mongomo, Mongomo
South Africa	1–1	Senegal	Estadio de Mongomo, Mongomo
27 January 2015
South Africa	1–2	Ghana	Estadio de Mongomo, Mongomo
Senegal	0–2	Algeria	Estadio de Malabo, Malabo

Quarter-final

1 February 2015
17:00

Ghana	3–0	Guinea
Atsu 4', 61'; Appiah 44'	Report

Estadio de Malabo, Malabo
Attendance: 14,500
Referee: Janny Sikazwe (Zambia)

Semi-final

5 February 2015
20:00

Ghana	3–0	Equatorial Guinea
J. Ayew 42' (pen.); Wakaso 45+1'; A. Ayew 75'	Report

Estadio de Malabo, Malabo
Attendance: 15,520
Referee: Eric Otogo-Castane (Gabon)

Final

8 February 2015
20:00

Ivory Coast	0–0 (a.e.t.)	Ghana
	Report
Penalties
Bony (penalty missed); Tallo (penalty missed); Aurier (penalty scored); Doumbia (penalty scored); Y. Touré (penalty scored); Kalou (penalty scored); K. Touré (penalty scored); Kanon (penalty scored); Bailly (penalty scored); Die (penalty scored); Barry (penalty scored)	9–8	(penalty scored) Wakaso; (penalty scored) J. Ayew; (penalty missed) Acquah; (penalty missed) Acheampong; (penalty scored) A. Ayew; (penalty scored) Mensah; (penalty scored) Badu; (penalty scored) Afful; (penalty scored) Baba; (penalty scored) Boye; (penalty missed) Razak

Estadio de Bata, Bata
Attendance: 32,857
Referee: Bakary Gassama (Gambia)

=== Ghana at the 2017 African Cup of Nations ===
Group D

Pos	Team	Pld	W	D	L	GF	GA	GD	Pts	Qualification
1	Egypt	3	2	1	0	2	0	+2	7	Advance to knockout stage
2	Ghana	3	2	0	1	2	1	+1	6	Advance to knockout stage
3	Mali	3	0	2	1	1	2	−1	2	
4	Uganda	3	0	1	2	1	3	−2	1	

Source: CAF
17 January 2017
17:00

Ghana	1–0	Uganda
A. Ayew 32' (pen.)	Report

Stade de Port-Gentil, Port-Gentil
Referee: Joshua Bondo (Botswana)
17 January 2017
20:00

Mali	0–0	Egypt
	Report

Stade de Port-Gentil, Port-Gentil
Referee: Daniel Bennett (South Africa)

21 January 2017
17:00

Ghana	1–0	Mali
Gyan 21'	Report

Stade de Port-Gentil, Port-Gentil
Referee: Mehdi Abid Charef (Algeria)
21 January 2017
20:00

Egypt	1–0	Uganda
Said 89'	Report

Stade de Port-Gentil, Port-Gentil
Referee: Malang Diedhiou (Senegal)

25 January 2017
20:00

Egypt	1–0	Ghana
M. Salah 11'	Report

Stade de Port-Gentil, Port-Gentil
Referee: Bakary Gassama (Gambia)
25 January 2017
20:00

Uganda	1–1	Mali
Miya 70'	Report	Bissouma 73'

Stade d'Oyem, Oyem
Referee: Ali Lemghaifry (Mauritania)

Quarter-final

29 January 2017
17:00

DR Congo	1–2	Ghana
M'Poku 68'	Report	J. Ayew 63'; A. Ayew 78' (pen.)

Stade d'Oyem, Oyem
Referee: Bernard Camille (Seychelles)

Semi-final

2 February 2017
20:00

Cameroon	2–0	Ghana
Ngadeu-Ngadjui 72'; Bassogog 90+3'	Report

Stade de Franceville, Franceville
Referee: Bakary Gassama (Gambia)

Third place play-off

4 February 2017
20:00

Burkina Faso	1–0	Ghana
Al. Traoré 89'	Report

Stade de Port-Gentil, Port-Gentil
Attendance: 20,720
Referee: Mehdi Abid Charef (Algeria)

=== Ghana at the 2019 African Cup of Nations ===
Group F

Pos	Team	Pld	W	D	L	GF	GA	GD	Pts	Qualification
1	Ghana	3	1	2	0	4	2	+2	5	Advance to knockout stage
2	Cameroon	3	1	2	0	2	0	+2	5	Advance to knockout stage
3	Benin	3	0	3	0	2	2	0	3	Advance to knockout stage
4	Guinea-Bissau	3	0	1	2	0	4	−4	1	

Source: CAF
25 June 2019
19:00

Cameroon	2–0	Guinea-Bissau
Yaya 66'; Bahoken 69'	Report

Ismailia Stadium, Ismailia
Attendance: 5,983
Referee: Noureddine El Jaafari (Morocco)
25 June 2019
22:00

Ghana	2–2	Benin
A. Ayew 9'; J. Ayew 42'	Report	Poté 2', 63'

Ismailia Stadium, Ismailia
Attendance: 8,094
Referee: Youssef Essrayri (Tunisia)

29 June 2019
19:00

Cameroon	0–0	Ghana
	Report

Ismailia Stadium, Ismailia
Attendance: 16,724
Referee: Bamlak Tessema Weyesa (Ethiopia)
29 June 2019
22:00

Benin	0–0	Guinea-Bissau
	Report

Ismailia Stadium, Ismailia
Attendance: 9,212
Referee: Pacifique Ndabihawenimana (Burundi)

2 July 2019
18:00

Benin	0–0	Cameroon
	Report

Ismailia Stadium, Ismailia
Attendance: 14,120
Referee: Sadok Selmi (Tunisia)
2 July 2019
18:00

Guinea-Bissau	0–2	Ghana
	Report	J. Ayew 46'; Partey 72'

Suez Stadium, Suez
Attendance: 6,905
Referee: Eric Otogo-Castane (Gabon)

Round of 16

8 July 2019
21:00

Ghana	1–1 (a.e.t.)	Tunisia
Bedoui 90+2' (o.g.)	Report	Khenissi 73'
Penalties
Wakaso (penalty scored); J. Ayew (penalty scored); Ekuban (penalty missed); Agbenyenu (penalty scored); Partey (penalty scored)	4–5	(penalty scored) Sliti; (penalty scored) Khazri; (penalty scored) Bronn; (penalty scored) Meriah; (penalty scored) Sassi

Ismailia Stadium, Ismailia
Attendance: 8,890
Referee: Victor Gomes (South Africa)

=== Ghana at the 2021 African Cup of Nations ===
Group C

Pos	Team	Pld	W	D	L	GF	GA	GD	Pts	Qualification
1	Morocco	3	2	1	0	5	2	+3	7	Advance to knockout stage
2	Gabon	3	1	2	0	4	3	+1	5	Advance to knockout stage
3	Comoros	3	1	0	2	3	5	−2	3	Advance to knockout stage
4	Ghana	3	0	1	2	3	5	−2	1	

Source: CAF
10 January 2022
17:00

Morocco	1–0	Ghana
Boufal 83'	Report

Ahmadou Ahidjo Stadium, Yaoundé
Referee: Joshua Bondo (Botswana)

14 January 2022
20:00

Gabon	1–1	Ghana
Allevinah 88'	Report	A. Ayew 18'

Ahmadou Ahidjo Stadium, Yaoundé
Referee: Lahlou Benbraham (Algeria)

18 January 2022
20:00

Ghana	2–3	Comoros
Boakye 64'; Djiku 77'	Report	Ben Nabouhane 4'; Mogni 62', 85'

Roumdé Adjia Stadium, Garoua
Referee: Boubou Traore (Mali)

=== Ghana at the 2023 African Cup of Nations ===
Group B

Pos	Team	Pld	W	D	L	GF	GA	GD	Pts	Qualification
1	Cape Verde	3	2	1	0	7	3	+4	7	Advance to knockout stage
2	Egypt	3	0	3	0	6	6	0	3	Advance to knockout stage
3	Ghana	3	0	2	1	5	6	−1	2 (Note: Tied on head-to-head points. Overall goal difference: Ghana −1, Mozambique −3.)	
4	Mozambique	3	0	2	1	4	7	−3	2	

Source: CAF
Notes:
14 January 2024
20:00

Ghana	1–2	Cape Verde
Djiku 56'	Report	Monteiro 17'; Rodrigues 90+2'

Felix Houphouet Boigny Stadium, Abidjan
Attendance: 11,943
Referee: Jean-Jacques Ndala (DR Congo)

18 January 2024
20:00

Egypt	2–2	Ghana
Marmoush 69'; Mohamed 74'	Report	Kudus 45+3', 71'

Felix Houphouet Boigny Stadium, Abidjan
Attendance: 20,808
Referee: Pierre Atcho (Gabon)

22 January 2024
20:00

Mozambique	2–2	Ghana
Geny 90+1' (pen.); Mandava 90+4'	Report	J. Ayew 15' (pen.), 70' (pen.)

Alassane Ouattara Stadium, Abidjan
Attendance: 6,000
Referee: Mutaz Ibrahim (Libya)

== By opponent ==
Legend
Won more than lost
Won equals lost
Lost more than won

Opponent	Pld	W	D	L	GF	GA	GD	Win %
Ivory Coast	10	6	2	2	20	12	+8	60,00%
Tunisia	8	6	2	0	13	6	+7	75,00%
DR Congo	8	5	1	2	14	8	+6	62,50%
Nigeria	7	3	1	3	7	7	0	42,86%
Guinea	6	4	2	0	9	3	+6	66,67%
Burkina Faso	5	3	1	1	7	3	+4	60,00%
Cameroon	5	0	3	2	1	4	-3	0,00%
Mali	5	3	0	2	5	5	0	60,00%
Senegal	4	2	1	1	5	4	+1	50,00%
Zambia	4	2	0	2	3	3	0	50,00%
Algeria	4	2	1	1	4	4	0	50,00%
Morocco	4	1	1	2	2	2	0	25,00%
South Africa	4	1	1	2	2	5	-2	25,00%
Egypt	4	1	1	2	1	2	-1	33,33%
Benin	3	1	1	1	5	4	1	33,33%
Sudan	2	1	0	1	3	1	2	50,00%
Congo	2	2	0	0	5	2	3	100,00%
Uganda	2	2	0	0	3	0	3	100,00%
Libya	2	0	2	0	3	3	0	0,00%
United Arab Rep.*	1	0	1	0	1	1	0	0,00%
Malawi	1	1	0	0	1	0	1	100,00%
Mozambique	1	1	0	0	2	0	2	100,00%
Zimbabwe	1	0	0	1	1	2	-1	0,00%
Namibia	1	1	0	0	1	0	+1	100,00%
Angola	1	1	0	0	1	0	+1	100,00%
Botswana	1	1	0	0	1	0	+1	100,00%
Niger	1	1	0	0	3	0	+3	100,00%
Cape Verde	1	1	0	0	2	0	+2	100,00%
Equatorial Guinea	1	1	0	0	3	0	+3	100,00%
Guinea-Bissau	1	1	0	0	2	0	+2	100,00%
Comoros	1	0	0	1	2	3	-1	0,00%
Gabon	1	0	1	0	1	1	0	0,00%
Ethiopia	1	1	0	0	2	0	+2	100,00%

== See also ==
- Ghana at the FIFA World Cup
