= Libya at the Africa Cup of Nations =

The Libya national football team has participated in three Africa Cup of Nations competitions in its history: 1982, 2006, and 2012.

Libya is an infrequent AFCON participant as it is one of the weaker sides in Africa, coming from the strong North African region that includes the national teams of Morocco, Egypt, Tunisia, and Algeria. Therefore, in spite of being a member of one of the stronger African federations, UNAF, Libya's accomplishments are limited compared to its neighbors. Nevertheless, Libya still has had some success at AFCON: as host of 1982 edition, Libya almost won the tournament but fell to Ghana in a penalty shoot-out. In the 2006 and 2012 tournaments, Libya exited both in the group stage.

Libya has been seeded in Group A in all three of its AFCON appearances.

== Overall record ==
Africa Cup of Nations record
Appearances: 3
Year	Round	Position	Pld	W	D	L	GF	GA
(Sudan) 1957	Did not enter							
(United Arab Republic) 1959	Did not enter							
(Ethiopia) 1962	Did not enter							
(Ghana) 1963	Did not enter							
(Tunisia) 1965	Did not enter							
(Ethiopia) 1968	Did not qualify							
(Sudan) 1970	Did not enter							
(Cameroon) 1972	Did not qualify							
(Egypt) 1974	Withdrew							
(Ethiopia) 1976	Did not enter							
(Ghana) 1978	Did not enter							
(Nigeria) 1980	Did not enter							
(Libya) 1982	Runners-up	2nd	5	2	3	0	7	4
(Ivory Coast) 1984	Did not qualify							
(Egypt) 1986	Did not qualify							
(Morocco) 1988	Withdrew							
(Algeria) 1990	Withdrew							
(Senegal) 1992	Did not enter							
(Tunisia) 1994	Did not enter							
(South Africa) 1996	Did not enter							
(Burkina Faso) 1998	Did not enter							
(Ghana) (Nigeria) 2000	Did not qualify							
(Mali) 2002	Did not qualify							
(Tunisia) 2004	Did not qualify							
(Egypt) 2006	Group stage	14th	3	0	1	2	1	5
(Ghana) 2008	Did not enter							
(Angola) 2010	Did not enter							
(Equatorial Guinea) (Gabon) 2012	Group stage	10th	3	1	1	1	4	4
(South Africa) 2013	Did not qualify							
(Equatorial Guinea) 2015	Did not qualify							
(Gabon) 2017	Did not qualify							
(Egypt) 2019	Did not qualify							
(Cameroon) 2021	Did not qualify							
(Ivory Coast) 2023	Did not qualify							
(Morocco) 2025	Did not qualify							
(Kenya) (Tanzania) (Uganda) 2027	To be determined							
Total	Runners-up	3/35	11	3	5	3	12	13

== List of matches ==
=== Libya 1982 ===
==== Group A ====
Team	Pld	W	D	L	GF	GA	GD	Pts
Libya	3	1	2	0	4	2	+2	5
Ghana	3	1	2	0	3	2	+1	5
Cameroon	3	0	3	0	1	1	0	3
Tunisia	3	0	1	2	1	4	−3	1

5 March 1982

Libya	2–2	Ghana
Jaranah 58'; Al-Issawi 76'	Report	Alhassan 28'; Opoku Nti 89'

11 June Stadium, Tripoli
Attendance: 45,200
Referee: Sohan Ramlochun (Mauritius)
9 March 1982

Libya	2–0	Tunisia
Seddik 42' (o.g.); Al-Bor'osi 89'	Report

11 June Stadium, Tripoli
Attendance: 40,000
Referee: Kambaji Kabongo (Zaire)
12 March 1982

Libya	0–0	Cameroon
	Report

11 June Stadium, Tripoli
Attendance: 40,000
Referee: Babacar Fall (Senegal)

==== Knockout stage ====
16 March 1982

Libya	2–1	Zambia
Al-Beshari 38', 84'	Report	29' Kaumba

11 June Stadium, Tripoli
Attendance: 50,000
Referee: Bakary Sarr (Senegal)
19 March 1982

Ghana	1–1	Libya
Alhassan 35'	Report	Al-Beshari 70'
Penalties
(penalty scored) Lamptey; (penalty scored) Alhassan; (penalty scored) Paha; (penalty scored) Asaase; (penalty scored) Abbrey; (penalty missed) Mensah; (penalty scored) Quarshie; (penalty scored) Afriyie	7–6	(penalty scored) Al-Beshari; (penalty scored) Sola; (penalty scored) Al-Ajeli; (penalty scored) Ben-Suleiman; (penalty scored) Al-Farjani; (penalty missed) Ghonaïm; (penalty scored) Jaranah; (penalty missed) Zeiyu

11 June Stadium, Tripoli
Attendance: 42,500
Referee: Sohan Ramlochun (Mauritius)

=== Egypt 2006 ===
==== Group A ====
Team	Pld	W	D	L	GF	GA	GD	Pts
Egypt	3	2	1	0	6	1	+5	7
Ivory Coast	3	2	0	1	4	4	0	6
Morocco	3	0	2	1	0	1	−1	2
Libya	3	0	1	2	1	5	−4	1

20 January 2006
19:00

Egypt	3–0	Libya
Mido 18'; Aboutrika 22'; A. Hassan 78'

Cairo International Stadium, Cairo
Attendance: 65,000
Referee: Lassina Paré (Burkina Faso)
24 January 2006
17:15

Libya	1–2	Ivory Coast
Kames 42'		Drogba 10'; Y. Touré 74'

Cairo International Stadium, Cairo
Attendance: 42,000
Referee: Shamsul Maidin (Singapore)
28 January 2006
19:00

Libya	0–0	Morocco

Cairo Military Academy Stadium, Cairo
Attendance: 5,000
Referee: Mourad Daami (Tunisia)

=== Equatorial Guinea/Gabon 2012 ===
==== Group A ====
Key to colours in group tables
Top two placed teams advanced to the quarterfinals

Team	Pld	W	D	L	GF	GA	GD	Pts
Zambia	3	2	1	0	5	3	+2	7
Equatorial Guinea	3	2	0	1	3	2	+1	6
Libya	3	1	1	1	4	4	0	4
Senegal	3	0	0	3	3	6	−3	0

21 January 2012
19:30

Equatorial Guinea	1–0	Libya
Balboa 87'	Report

Estadio de Bata, Bata
Attendance: 35,000
Referee: Noumandiez Doué (Ivory Coast)
25 January 2012
18:15 (Note: Original kick-off at 17:00 but was delayed due to heavy rain.)

Libya	2–2	Zambia
Saad 5', 48'	Report	Mayuka 29'; C. Katongo 54'

Estadio de Bata, Bata
Attendance: 1,500
Referee: Koman Coulibaly (Mali)
29 January 2012
19:00

Libya	2–1	Senegal
Boussefi 5', 84'	Report	D. N'Diaye 10'

Estadio de Bata, Bata
Attendance: 10,000
Referee: Rajindraparsad Seechurn (Mauritius)
