= 1982 African Cup of Nations final =

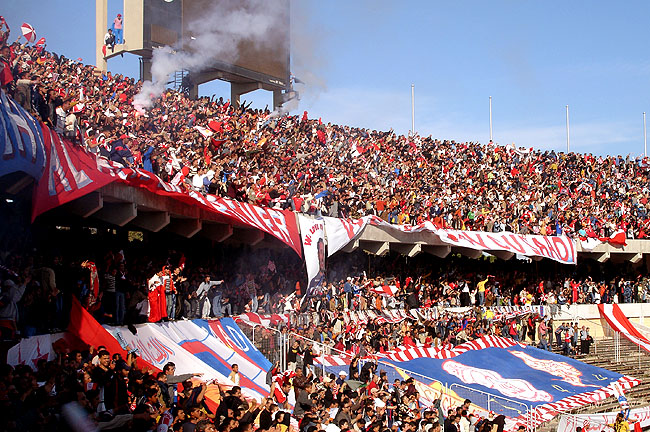
- The 11 June Stadium hosted the match
- Event: 1982 African Cup of Nations
| Ghana | Libya |
| (Ghana) | (Libya) |
| 1 | 1 |
- After extra time Ghana won 7–6 on penalties
- Date: 19 March 1982
- Venue: 11 June Stadium, Tripoli
- Referee: Sohan Ramlochun (Mauritius)
- Attendance: 50,000

The 1982 African Cup of Nations final was a football match held on 19 March 1982 at the 11 June Stadium in Tripoli, Libya, to determine the winner of the 1982 African Cup of Nations. Ghana defeated Libya 7–6 on penalties after extra time ended 1–1, with goals from George Alhassan for Ghana and Ali Al-Beshari for Libya. This was Ghana's fourth and last continental title as of 2026.

== Road to the final ==
| Ghana | | Libya | |
| Opponents | Results | Opponents | Results |
Group stage
| Libya | 2–2 | Ghana | 2–2 |
| Cameroon | 0–0 | Tunisia | 2–0 |
| Tunisia | 1–0 | Cameroon | 0–0 |
Semi-finals
| Algeria | 3–2 (a.e.t.) | Zambia | 2–1 |

== Match ==
=== Details ===
19 March 1982

| Ghana | 1–1 (a.e.t.) | Libya |
|---|---|---|
| Alhassan 35' | Report | Al-Beshari 70' |
Penalties
| Lamptey (penalty scored); Alhassan (penalty scored); Paha (penalty scored); Asaase (penalty scored); Abbrey (penalty scored); Mensah (penalty missed); Quarshie (penalty scored); Afriyie (penalty scored) | 7–6 | (penalty scored) Al-Beshari; (penalty scored) Sola; (penalty scored) Al-Ajeli; (penalty scored) Ben-Suleiman; (penalty scored) Al-Farjani; (penalty missed) Ghonaïm; (penalty scored) Jaranah; (penalty missed) Zeiyu |

11 June Stadium, Tripoli
Attendance: 50,000
Referee: Sohan Ramlochun (Mauritius)

| Ghana | Libya |

| GK | 22 | Michael Owusu Mensah |
| RB | | Haruna Yusif |
| CB | 8 | Isaac Paha |
| CB | | Charles Kwame Sampson |
| LB | | Sampson Lamptey |
| RM | | Windsor Kofi Abbrey |
| CM | | Albert Asaase |
| CM | | Kofi Badu | (substituted off) 68' |
| LM | | John Essien | (substituted off) 52' |
| CF | | George Alhassan |
| CF | 13 | Emmanuel Quarshie (c) |
Substitutions:
| GK | 1 | Joseph Carr |
| DF | | Seth Ampadu |
| DF | | Akwasi Appiah |
| DF | | Hesse Odamtten |
| MF | | Abedi Pele | (substituted on) 68' |
| MF | | Opoku Nti | (substituted on) 52' |
| MF | | John Baker |
| FW | 9 | Opoku Afriyie |
| FW | | Ben Kayede |
| MF | | John Bannerman |
| | | Acquaye Mclean |
Manager:
(Ghana) Charles Gyamfi

| GK | 1 | Ramzy Al-Kouafi |
| RB | 2 | Sassi Al-Ajeli |
| CB | 3 | Ali Al-Beshari |
| CB | 14 | Abdallah Zeiyu |
| LB | 5 | Saleh Sola |
| CM | 8 | Abdel Fatah Al-Farjani |
| CM | 10 | Fawzi Al-Issawi |
| CM | 17 | Abdel Moneim Ghonaïm |
| RW | 18 | Abdel Razak Al-Farjani | (substituted off) 70' |
| CF | 9 | Abdel Razak Jaranah |
| LW | 7 | Faraj Al-Bor'osi | (substituted off) 57' |
Substitutions:
| GK | 21 | Mesbah Shanqab |
| DF | 4 | Mehdi Al-Kharef |
| MF | 6 | Suleiman Omar |
| MF | 16 | Salem Al-Jehani |
| FW | 19 | Basheer Al-Rayani |
| | 11 | Abdel Salam Al-Maghribi |
| | 12 | Abubaker Ben-Suleiman | (substituted on) 70' |
| | 13 | Mohammad Al-Teer |
| | 15 | Mohamed Majdoub | (substituted on) 57' |
| | 20 | Abubaker Ben Brahim |
| | 22 | Mahfod Al-Hadi |
Manager:
(Hungary) Bela Gotl

Assistant referees:
...
...
