= Africa Cup of Nations awards =

Football competition award

At the end of each Africa Cup of Nations final tournament, several awards are presented to the players and teams which have distinguished themselves in various aspects of the match.

== Awards ==
There are currently six post-tournament awards:

- the Best Player for most valuable player;
- the Top Goalscorer for most prolific goal scorer;
- the Best Goalkeeper for most outstanding goalkeeper;
- the Best Young Player for most outstanding young player;
- the Team of the Tournament for best combined team of players at the tournament;
- the Fair Play Award for the team with the best record of fair play.

== Best Player ==
Year	Hosts	Best Player
1957	Sudan	(Egypt) Ad-Diba
1959	United Arab Republic	(United Arab Republic) Ad-Diba
1962	Ethiopia	(Ethiopia) Mengistu Worku
1963	Ghana	(United Arab Republic) Hassan El-Shazly
1965	Tunisia	(Ghana) Osei Kofi
1968	Ethiopia	(Democratic Republic of the Congo) Kazadi Mwamba
1970	Sudan	(Ivory Coast) Laurent Pokou
1972	Cameroon	(Republic of the Congo) Jean-Pierre Tokoto
1974	Egypt	(Egypt) Hassan Shehata
1976	Ethiopia	(Morocco) Ahmed Faras
1978	Ghana	(Ghana) Karim Abdul Razak
1980	Nigeria	(Nigeria) Christian Chukwu
1982	Libya	(Libya) Fawzi Al-Issawi
1984	Ivory Coast	(Cameroon) Théophile Abega
1986	Egypt	(Cameroon) Roger Milla
1988	Morocco	(Cameroon) Roger Milla
1990	Algeria	(Algeria) Rabah Madjer
1992	Senegal	(Ghana) Abedi Pele
1994	Tunisia	(Nigeria) Rashidi Yekini
1996	South Africa	(Zambia) Kalusha Bwalya
1998	Burkina Faso	(South Africa) Benni McCarthy
2000	Ghana; Nigeria	(Cameroon) Lauren
2002	Mali	(Cameroon) Rigobert Song
2004	Tunisia	(Nigeria) Jay-Jay Okocha
2006	Egypt	(Egypt) Ahmed Hassan
2008	Ghana	(Egypt) Hosny Abd Rabo
2010	Angola	(Egypt) Ahmed Hassan
2012	Gabon; Equatorial Guinea	(Zambia) Christopher Katongo
2013	South Africa	(Burkina Faso) Jonathan Pitroipa
2015	Equatorial Guinea	(Ghana) Christian Atsu
2017	Gabon	(Cameroon) Christian Bassogog
2019	Egypt	(Algeria) Ismaël Bennacer
2021	Cameroon	(Senegal) Sadio Mané
2023	Ivory Coast	(Nigeria) William Troost-Ekong
2025	Morocco	(Senegal) Sadio Mané

== Top Goalscorer ==
Year	Hosts	Top Goalscorer(s)	Goals
1957	Sudan	(Egypt) Ad-Diba	5
1959	United Arab Republic	(United Arab Republic) Mahmoud El-Gohary	3
1962	Ethiopia	(Ethiopia) Mengistu Worku (United Arab Republic) Badawi Abdel Fattah	3
1963	Ghana	(United Arab Republic) Hassan El-Shazly	6
1965	Tunisia	(Ghana) Ben Acheampong (Ghana) Osei Kofi (Ivory Coast) Eustache Manglé	3
1968	Ethiopia	(Ivory Coast) Laurent Pokou	6
1970	Sudan	(Ivory Coast) Laurent Pokou	8
1972	Cameroon	(Mali) Salif Keïta	5
1974	Egypt	(Zaire) Ndaye Mulamba	9
1976	Ethiopia	(Guinea) Mamadou Aliou Keïta	4
1978	Ghana	(Uganda) Phillip Omondi (Ghana) Opoku Afriyie (Nigeria) Segun Odegbami	3
1980	Nigeria	(Morocco) Khalid Labied (Nigeria) Segun Odegbami	3
1982	Libya	(Ghana) George Alhassan	4
1984	Ivory Coast	(Egypt) Taher Abouzaid	4
1986	Egypt	(Cameroon) Roger Milla	4
1988	Morocco	(Algeria) Lakhdar Belloumi (Cameroon) Roger Milla (Ivory Coast) Abdoulaye Traoré (Egypt) Gamal Abdelhamid	2
1990	Algeria	(Algeria) Djamel Menad	4
1992	Senegal	(Nigeria) Rashidi Yekini	4
1994	Tunisia	(Nigeria) Rashidi Yekini	5
1996	South Africa	(Zambia) Kalusha Bwalya	5
1998	Burkina Faso	(Egypt) Hossam Hassan (South Africa) Benni McCarthy	7
2000	Ghana; Nigeria	(South Africa) Shaun Bartlett	5
2002	Mali	(Cameroon) Patrick Mboma (Cameroon) Salomon Olembé (Nigeria) Julius Aghahowa	3
2004	Tunisia	(Cameroon) Patrick Mboma (Mali) Frédéric Kanouté (Morocco) Youssef Mokhtari (Nigeria) Jay-Jay Okocha (Tunisia) Francileudo Santos	4
2006	Egypt	(Cameroon) Samuel Eto'o	5
2008	Ghana	(Cameroon) Samuel Eto'o	5
2010	Angola	(Egypt) Mohamed Nagy	5
2012	Gabon; Equatorial Guinea	(Angola) Manucho (Ivory Coast) Didier Drogba (Gabon) Pierre-Emerick Aubameyang (Mali) Cheick Diabaté (Morocco) Houssine Kharja (Zambia) Christopher Katongo (Zambia) Emmanuel Mayuka	3
2013	South Africa	(Ghana) Mubarak Wakaso (Nigeria) Emmanuel Emenike	4
2015	Equatorial Guinea	(Republic of the Congo) Thievy Bifouma (Democratic Republic of the Congo) Dieumerci Mbokani (Equatorial Guinea) Javier Balboa (Ghana) André Ayew (Tunisia) Ahmed Akaïchi	3
2017	Gabon	(Democratic Republic of the Congo) Junior Kabananga	3
2019	Egypt	(Nigeria) Odion Ighalo	5
2021	Cameroon	(Cameroon) Vincent Aboubakar	8
2023	Ivory Coast	(Equatorial Guinea) Emilio Nsue	5
2025	Morocco	(Morocco) Brahim Díaz	5

== Best Goalkeeper ==
Year	Hosts	Best Goalkeeper
2008	Ghana	(Egypt) Essam El-Hadary
2010	Angola	(Egypt) Essam El-Hadary
2012	Gabon; Equatorial Guinea	Not awarded
2013	South Africa	Not awarded
2015	Equatorial Guinea	(Ivory Coast) Sylvain Gbohouo
2017	Gabon	Not awarded
2019	Egypt	(Algeria) Raïs M'Bolhi
2021	Cameroon	(Senegal) Édouard Mendy
2023	Ivory Coast	(South Africa) Ronwen Williams
2025	Morocco	(Morocco) Yassine Bounou

== Best Young Player ==
Year	Hosts	Best Young Player
2019	Egypt	(Senegal) Krépin Diatta
2021	Cameroon	(Burkina Faso) Issa Kaboré
2023	Ivory Coast	(Ivory Coast) Simon Adingra
2025	Morocco	Not awarded

== Team of the Tournament ==
Year	Hosts	Goalkeeper	Defenders	Midfielders	Forwards	Manager
1970	Sudan	(Sudan) Abd Al Aziz Abdallah	(Sudan) Samir Salih (Ghana) John Eshun (Sudan) Amin Zaki (United Arab Republic) Hany Moustafa	(Ivory Coast) Ernest Kallet Bialy (Ghana) Ibrahim Sunday (Ivory Coast) ... Gnawri (Guinea) Camara Mamadou Maxim	(Ivory Coast) Laurent Pokou (Sudan) Jaksa	—
1972	Cameroon	(Morocco) Allal Ben Kassou	(Sudan) Abdella "Kaunda" El-Ser (Zaire) Tshimen Bwanga (Cameroon) Paul Nlend (Morocco) Boujemaa Benkhrif	(Republic of the Congo) Noël Minga (Zaire) Mayanga Maku (Cameroon) Paul-Gaston N'Dongo (Cameroon) Jean-Pierre Tokoto	(Zaire) Kakoko Etepé (Republic of the Congo) François M'Pelé	—
1974	Egypt	(Zaire) Kazadi Mwamba	(Republic of the Congo) Gabriel Dengaki (Zambia) Dick Chama (Zaire) Lobilo Boba (Egypt) Hany Moustafa	(Zaire) Ndaye Mulamba (Egypt) Farouk Gaafar (Egypt) Hassan Shehata (Zaire) Mayanga Maku	(Zaire) Kakoko Etepé (Egypt) Ali Abo Greisha	—
1976	Ethiopia	(Morocco) Mohammed Al-Hazaz	(Morocco) Mustapha "Chérif" Fetoui (Egypt) Mustafa Younis (Guinea) Chérif Souleymane (Guinea) Djibril Diara	(Ethiopia) Tolde (Egypt) Farouk Gaafar (Nigeria) Haruna Ilerika (Nigeria) Kunle Awesu	(Guinea) Petit Sory (Morocco) Ahmed Faras	—
1978	Ghana	(Morocco) Mohammed Al-Hazaz	(Tunisia) Mokhtar Dhouieb (Ghana) James Kuuku Dadzie (Tunisia) Khaled Gasmi (Morocco) Larbi Ihardane	(Uganda) Moses Nsereko (Ghana) Karim Abdul Razak (Ghana) Adolf Armah (Uganda) Phillip Omondi	(Nigeria) Segun Odegbami (Ghana) Mohammed Polo	—
1980	Nigeria	(Nigeria) Best Ogedegbe	(Algeria) Mustapha Kouici (Egypt) Mohamed Salah El-Din (Guinea) Moussa Camara (Nigeria) Christian Chukwu	(Algeria) Lakhdar Belloumi (Algeria) Ali Fergani (Egypt) Mahmoud El Khatib (Egypt) Shawky Gharieb	(Algeria) Salah Assad (Nigeria) Segun Odegbami	—
1982	Libya	(Cameroon) Thomas Nkono	(Algeria) Chaabane Merzekane (Ghana) Sampson Lamptey (Ghana) Haruna Yusif (Libya) Ali Al-Beshari	(Ghana) George Alhassan (Ghana) Samuel Opoku Nti (Ghana) Emmanuel Quarshie (Libya) Fawzi Al-Issawi	(Algeria) Salah Assad (Algeria) Rabah Madjer	—
1984	Ivory Coast	(Cameroon) Joseph-Antoine Bell	(Cameroon) Isaac Sinkot (Egypt) Ali Shehata (Egypt) Ibrahim Youssef (Nigeria) Stephen Keshi	(Algeria) Lakhdar Belloumi (Cameroon) Théophile Abega (Egypt) Taher Abouzeid (Nigeria) Clement Temile	(Algeria) Djamel Menad (Malawi) Clifton Msiya	—
1986	Egypt	(Cameroon) Thomas N'Kono	(Cameroon) André Kana-Biyik (Egypt) Ali Shehata (Senegal) Roger Mendy (Egypt) Rabei Yassin	(Cameroon) Emile Mbouh (Egypt) Magdi Abdelghani (Egypt) Moustafa Abdou (Egypt) Taher Abouzaid	(Cameroon) Roger Milla (Zambia) Kalusha Bwalya	—
1988	Morocco	(Cameroon) Joseph-Antoine Bell	(Morocco) Tijani El Maataoui (Cameroon) Emmanuel Kundé (Zaire) John Buana (Cameroon) Stephen Tataw	(Zaire) Jacques Kinkomba Kingambo (Cameroon) Emile Mbouh (Nigeria) Henry Nwosu (Cameroon) Paul Mfede	(Cameroon) Roger Milla (Morocco) Aziz Bouderbala	—
1990	Algeria	(Algeria) Antar Osmani	(Algeria) Ali Benhalima (Cameroon) André Kana-Biyik (Ivory Coast) Arsène Hobou (Zambia) Samuel Chomba	(Algeria) Djamel Amani (Algeria) Rabah Madjer (Algeria) Tahar Chérif El-Ouazzani (Nigeria) Moses Kpakor	(Algeria) Djamel Menad (Zambia) Webster Chikabala	—
1992	Senegal	(Ivory Coast) Alain Gouaméné	(Ivory Coast) Basile Aka Kouame (Egypt) Hany Ramzy (Nigeria) Stephen Keshi (Senegal) Adolphe Mendy	(Zaire) Jacques Kinkomba Kingambo (Ghana) Abedi Pele (Cameroon) Jean-Claude Pagal (Ivory Coast) Serge-Alain Maguy	(Nigeria) Rashidi Yekini (Ghana) Tony Yeboah	—
1994	Tunisia	(Egypt) Ahmed Shobair	(Ghana) Frank Amankwah (Zambia) Harrison Chongo (Zambia) Elijah Litana (Nigeria) Benedict Iroha	(Ivory Coast) Serge-Alain Maguy (Nigeria) Jay-Jay Okocha (Nigeria) Daniel Amokachi (Ghana) Abedi Pele	(Ivory Coast) Joël Tiéhi (Nigeria) Rashidi Yekini	—
1996	South Africa	(Tunisia) Chokri El Ouaer	(Egypt) Yasser Radwan (South Africa) Mark Fish (Zambia) Elijah Litana (Ghana) Isaac Asare	(Tunisia) Zoubeir Baya (Egypt) Hazem Emam (Ghana) Abedi Pele (South Africa) Mark Williams	(Zambia) Kalusha Bwalya (Ghana) Tony Yeboah	—
1998	Burkina Faso	(Egypt) Nader El-Sayed	(South Africa) Mark Fish (Mozambique) Jojo (Morocco) Noureddine Naybet (Egypt) Mohamed Emara	(Ghana) Charles Akonnor (Tunisia) Hassen Gabsi (Ivory Coast) Tchiressoua Guel (Democratic Republic of the Congo) Didier Ekanza Simba	(Egypt) Hossam Hassan (South Africa) Benni McCarthy	—
2000	Ghana; Nigeria	(Egypt) Nader El-Sayed	(Senegal) Pape Malick Diop (Tunisia) Khaled Badra (Cameroon) Rigobert Song (Egypt) Mohamed Emara	(Algeria) Billel Dziri (Cameroon) Lauren (Nigeria) Jay-Jay Okocha (Senegal) Khalilou Fadiga	(Cameroon) Samuel Eto'o (South Africa) Shaun Bartlett	—
2002	Mali	(Senegal) Tony Sylva	(Nigeria) Taribo West (Cameroon) Rigobert Song (Nigeria) Ifeanyi Udeze (Egypt) Hany Ramzy	(Mali) Seydou Keita (Algeria) Rafik Saifi (Cameroon) Patrick M'Boma (South Africa) Sibusiso Zuma	(Nigeria) Julius Aghahowa (Senegal) El Hadji Diouf	—
2004	Tunisia	(Nigeria) Vincent Enyeama	(Morocco) Walid Regragui (Tunisia) Khaled Badra (Morocco) Abdeslam Ouaddou (Cameroon) Timothée Atouba	(Algeria) Karim Ziani (Tunisia) Riadh Bouazizi (Nigeria) Jay-Jay Okocha (Nigeria) John Utaka	(Mali) Frédéric Kanouté (Tunisia) Francileudo Santos	—
2006	Egypt	(Egypt) Essam El Hadary	(Cameroon) Rigobert Song (Egypt) Wael Gomaa (Ivory Coast) Emmanuel Eboué (Nigeria) Taye Taiwo	(Ghana) Stephen Appiah (Egypt) Mohamed Aboutrika (Egypt) Ahmed Hassan (Guinea) Pascal Feindouno	(Ivory Coast) Didier Drogba (Cameroon) Samuel Eto'o	—
2008	Ghana	(Egypt) Essam El-Hadary	(Cameroon) Geremi (Egypt) Wael Gomaa (Ghana) Michael Essien	(Ghana) Sulley Muntari (Ivory Coast) Yaya Touré (Cameroon) Alex Song (Egypt) Hosny Abd Rabo (Egypt) Mohamed Aboutrika	(Egypt) Amr Zaki (Angola) Manucho	—
2010	Angola	(Egypt) Essam El-Hadary	(Algeria) Madjid Bougherra (Egypt) Wael Gomaa (Angola) Mabiná	(Egypt) Ahmed Fathy (Nigeria) Peter Odemwingie (Cameroon) Alex Song (Egypt) Ahmed Hassan	(Ghana) Asamoah Gyan (Egypt) Mohamed Zidan (Angola) Flávio	—
2012	Gabon; Equatorial Guinea	(Zambia) Kennedy Mweene	(Ivory Coast) Jean-Jacques Gosso (Zambia) Stophira Sunzu (Ghana) John Mensah (Mali) Adama Tamboura	(Zambia) Emmanuel Mayuka (Ivory Coast) Yaya Touré (Ivory Coast) Gervinho (Mali) Seydou Keita	(Zambia) Christopher Katongo (Ivory Coast) Didier Drogba	—
2013	South Africa	(Nigeria) Vincent Enyeama	(Burkina Faso) Bakary Koné (Cape Verde) Nando (Ivory Coast) Siaka Tiéné (Nigeria) Efe Ambrose	(Burkina Faso) Jonathan Pitroipa (Mali) Seydou Keita (Nigeria) Mikel John Obi (Nigeria) Victor Moses	(Ghana) Asamoah Gyan (Nigeria) Emmanuel Emenike	—
2015	Equatorial Guinea	(Ivory Coast) Sylvain Gbohouo (Democratic Republic of the Congo) Robert Kidiaba (tie)	(Ivory Coast) Serge Aurier (Ghana) Harrison Afful (Ivory Coast) Kolo Touré	(Ghana) André Ayew (Ivory Coast) Yaya Touré (Ivory Coast) Max Gradel (Democratic Republic of the Congo) Yannick Bolasie (Ivory Coast) Gervinho	(Ghana) Christian Atsu (Ivory Coast) Wilfried Bony	—
2017	Gabon	(Cameroon) Fabrice Ondoa	(Senegal) Kara Mbodji (Egypt) Ahmed Hegazi (Cameroon) Michael Ngadeu-Ngadjui	(Burkina Faso) Charles Kaboré (Ghana) Mubarak Wakaso (Burkina Faso) Bertrand Traoré (Ghana) Christian Atsu (Egypt) Mohamed Salah	(Cameroon) Christian Bassogog (Democratic Republic of the Congo) Junior Kabananga	—
2019	Egypt	(Algeria) Raïs M'Bolhi	(Senegal) Kalidou Koulibaly (Tunisia) Yassine Meriah (Senegal) Lamine Gassama (Senegal) Youssouf Sabaly	(Senegal) Idrissa Gueye (Algeria) Adlène Guedioura (Algeria) Ismaël Bennacer	(Nigeria) Odion Ighalo (Senegal) Sadio Mané (Algeria) Riyad Mahrez	(Algeria) Djamel Belmadi
2021	Cameroon	(Senegal) Édouard Mendy	(Morocco) Achraf Hakimi (Egypt) Mohamed Abdelmonem (Burkina Faso) Edmond Tapsoba (Senegal) Saliou Ciss	(Egypt) Mohamed Elneny (Senegal) Nampalys Mendy (Burkina Faso) Blati Touré	(Egypt) Mohamed Salah (Cameroon) Vincent Aboubakar (Senegal) Sadio Mané	(Senegal) Aliou Cissé
2023	Ivory Coast	(South Africa) Ronwen Williams	(Nigeria) Ola Aina (Nigeria) William Troost-Ekong (Democratic Republic of the Congo) Chancel Mbemba (Ivory Coast) Ghislain Konan	(South Africa) Teboho Mokoena (Ivory Coast) Jean Michaël Seri (Ivory Coast) Franck Kessié	(Democratic Republic of the Congo) Yoane Wissa (Equatorial Guinea) Emilio Nsue (Nigeria) Ademola Lookman	(Ivory Coast) Emerse Faé
2025	Morocco	(Morocco) Yassine Bounou	(Morocco) Noussair Mazraoui (Nigeria) Calvin Bassey (Senegal) Moussa Niakhaté (Morocco) Achraf Hakimi	(Senegal) Pape Gueye (Senegal) Idrissa Gueye (Nigeria) Ademola Lookman	(Senegal) Sadio Mané (Nigeria) Victor Osimhen (Morocco) Brahim Díaz	—

== Fair Play Award ==
Year	Hosts	Winner
2012	Gabon; Equatorial Guinea	Ivory Coast
2013	South Africa	Not Awarded
2015	Equatorial Guinea	DR Congo
2017	Gabon	Egypt
2019	Egypt	Senegal
2021	Cameroon	Senegal
2023	Ivory Coast	South Africa
2025	Morocco	Morocco

== See also ==
- FIFA World Cup awards
- UEFA European Championship awards
- Copa América awards
- AFC Asian Cup awards
- CONCACAF Gold Cup awards
- OFC Men's Nations Cup awards
