= Football in Libya =

- Country: Libya
- Governing body: Libyan Football Federation
- National team: men's national team

Club competitions
- Libyan Premier League

International competitions
- Champions League; CAF Confederation Cup; Super Cup; FIFA Club World Cup; FIFA World Cup (National Team); African Cup of Nations (National Team)

Football is the most popular sport in Libya, a North African country with a population of around 6,800,000. The governing body is the Libyan Football Federation, which was founded in 1962.

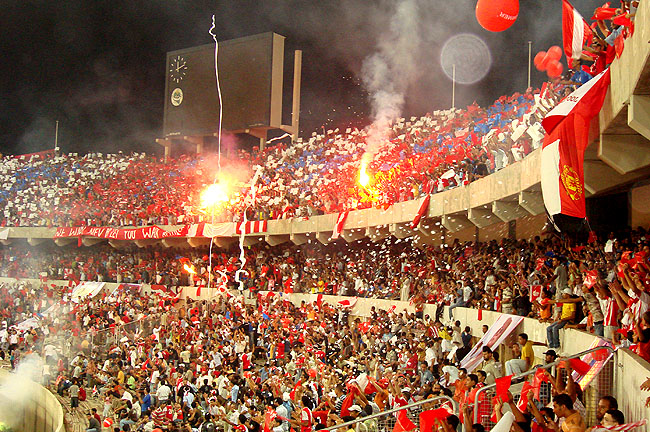
Al-Ittihad fans during a Champions League game in 2007.

== Football culture ==
Libyans are passionate towards football. Most kids and teenagers in Libya usually play football in the streets as their favorite pastime. Most people leave their duties and jobs to go and watch a game. People in Libya have experienced many incidents during, before, or after derby games such as killing and some riots, this usually happens when Libya's top three clubs, Al-Ittihad Tripoli, Ahly Tripoli, and Ahly Benghazi face off. Though Libya has not achieved big on both International and Club level, Libyans are known to be skillful, having produced such talented players such as TarIk El-Taib, Jehad Muntasser, Ahmed Saad, and Fawzi Al-Issawi.

== National championships ==
Prior to national championships, football was held at regional level. The first regional championships (of Italian Libya) were held in 1928. The first team was "US Bengasi" in Cyrenaica, with Italian colonists and local Arab players. The team "US Tripolina" of Tripoli was in 1938 and 1939 in the "First amateur division" of the Italian championship. These regional championships were blocked during WW2.

There were three regional leagues in Libya since 1949: West, East and South.

=== Libyan Premier League ===
This is the top flight of Libyan football. This is a semi-professional league, although some foreign players are professionals. The first championship was held in 1963, and was won by Al Ahly Tripoli (see: Libyan Premier League 1963–64). Al Ittihad have won the most championships, with 14, including the last 4 titles.

The league is ranked as the 56th best league in the world for 2009, according to IFFHS.

There are two other divisions, the Libyan Second Division, and the Libyan Third Division.

=== Libyan Cup ===
This competition was first initiated in 1976, although only 5 editions of the competition were played in the following twenty years. In the past, the runners-up of the Libyan Premier League were named the domestic cup champions. Al Ahly Tripoli and Al Ittihad Tripoli are the joint record winners, with 5 titles each. The holders are Khaleej Sirte, who beat Al Madina Tripoli 1–0 in a tense final (see 2008 Libyan Al-Fatih Cup Final)

=== Libyan Trophy ===
This competition was initiated in 2007. It is contested by members of the Premier League only. Khaleej Sirte won the inaugural competition.

== National team ==
The national team, nicknamed The Mediterranean Knights, is considered one of the stronger teams in Africa and the Arab world, particularly in recent years. The good performances recorded in the 2012 Africa Cup of Nations under Brazilian Coach Marcos Paqueta saw the team record their first win in the tournament outside of Libya in their final match against Senegal. This saw their FIFA world rankings rise to the highest it had ever been at 53, which later rose again to 36 in September 2012.

=== 1900s ===
They had one of their most successful periods in the 1980s, when such players as Salim Abu Jarrad, Fawzi Al-Issawi and Ali Al-Beshari almost led the side to silverware. In 1982, Libya hosted the 1982 African Cup of Nations, a competition in which they came second, losing 7-6 to Ghana on penalty kicks. The team was also very close to qualifying for the 1986 FIFA World Cup, where they lost 3-1 to Morocco over two legs.

The 1990s was a poor period for the national team. Libya was disqualified from qualifying for the 1994 FIFA World Cup due to UN sanctions, and the team withdrew from qualifying for the 1990 competition. They did not enter the qualification process for the 1998 edition. They did do better in UAFA competitions, bowing out in the semi-finals of the 1999 Pan Arab Games.

=== 2000–present ===
The 2000s were better for the nation, and with players such as Tarik El Taib, Nader Kara and Ahmad Saad coming through, the national team grew in strength, and did get to the final round of qualifying for the 2002 FIFA World Cup. Although they finished bottom of the group with two points from 8 games, the country did have a sense of pride, and came back stronger, coming within a point of qualification for the 2004 African Cup of Nations. Two years later, the side did get to its second Nations tournament, having finished fourth in their 2006 FIFA World Cup qualification group. The side did well in their group, which did contain the two finalists, Ivory Coast and the winners Egypt, as well as the 2004 African Cup of Nations runners-up Morocco. A 3–0 defeat to Egypt crippled their chances, and the team got respectable results, including a 2–1 defeat against the Ivory Coast, and a 0–0 draw against Morocco. The team did suffer a setback in qualification for the African Cup Of Nations 2008 tournament. The side suffered disappointing away defeats against Ethiopia and Namibia, which ruined their chances of qualifying.

The club came very close to qualification for the 2010 FIFA World Cup. The team secured a famous victory against Ghana, with an 86th-minute goal from Ahmed Saad Osman, but fell at the final hurdle, losing 1-0 to Gabon, which eliminated them on goal difference.

In 2014 African Nations Championship the Libyan national team won its first title beating Ghana on penalties.

== Football stadiums in Libya ==
#	Stadium	Capacity	City	Tenants	Image
1	Tripoli Stadium	65,000	Tripoli	Libya national football team	
2	Martyrs of February Stadium	10,550	Benghazi	Al-Ahly SCSC; Al-Hilal SCSC; Al-Nasr SCSC	

== Attendances ==
The top-flight football league matches in Libya have generally been held in front of very small crowds due to restrictions between 2011 and 2023.

The average attendance per top-flight football league season and the club with the highest average attendance:

Season	League average	Best club	Best club average
2008-09	2,504	Al-Ittihad SCSC	12,487

== See also ==
- Lists of stadiums
