= 1982 African Cup of Nations qualification =

Football tournament

This page details the qualifying process for the 1982 African Cup of Nations in Libya. Libya, as hosts, and Nigeria, as title holders, qualified automatically.

== Qualifying tournament ==
Nigeria qualified as holders
Libya qualified as hosts

=== Preliminary round ===
Team 1	Agg.	Team 2	1st leg	2nd leg
Mozambique	7–3	Lesotho	6–1	1–2
Madagascar	1–1 (a)	Mauritius	0–0	1–1
Mali	3–2	Mauritania	2–0	1–2
Malawi	1–2	Zimbabwe	0–1	1–1
Liberia	1–1 (a)	Gambia	0–0	1–1
Angola	1–1 (a)	Congo	1–1	0–0
Senegal	4–1	Sierra Leone	2–0	2–1
Equatorial Guinea	w/o	Benin	—	—
Rwanda	w/o	Uganda	—	—
Upper Volta	w/o	Gabon	—	—

10 August 1980

Mozambique	6–1	Lesotho

Estádio da Machava, Maputo
Referee: Bester Kalombo (Malawi)
24 August 1980

Lesotho	2–1	Mozambique

Maseru
Referee: Ismail Bhamjee (Botswana)

Mozambique won 7–3 on aggregate.

14 September 1980

Madagascar	0–0	Mauritius

Mahamasina Municipal Stadium, Antananarivo
28 September 1980

Mauritius	1–1	Madagascar
L'Enflé		Goal

Stade George V, Curepipe
Attendance: 50,000

Madagascar won by away goals rule after 1–1 on aggregate.

28 September 1980

Mali	2–0	Mauritania

Stade Mamadou Konaté, Bamako
Referee: Mark Dormoh (Liberia)
12 October 1980

Mauritania	2–1	Mali

Stade de la Capitale, Nouakchott
Referee: Hamad Diagne (Guinea)

Mali won 3–2 on aggregate.

26 October 1980

Malawi	0–1	Zimbabwe
		Manuel

Kamuzu Stadium, Blantyre
Referee: Edward Bukenya (Uganda)
9 November 1980

Zimbabwe	1–1	Malawi
Goal		Gondwe

Rufaro Stadium, Salisbury
Referee: Mohamed Nyamana (Tanzania)

Zimbabwe won 2–1 on aggregate.

9 November 1980

Liberia	0–0	Gambia

Antoinette Tubman Stadium, Monrovia
Referee: Mark Dormoh (Liberia)
23 November 1980

Gambia	1–1	Liberia

Box Bar Stadium, Banjul
Referee: Youssou N'Diaye (Senegal)

Liberia won by away goals rule after 1–1 on aggregate.

16 November 1980

Angola	1–1	Congo
Ndunguidi		Massamba

Estádio dos Coqueiros, Luanda
Referee: Kambaji Kabongo (Zaire)
30 November 1980

Congo	0–0	Angola

Stade Alphonse Massemba-Débat, Brazzaville

Congo won by away goals rule after 1–1 on aggregate.

17 November 1980

Senegal	2–0	Sierra Leone
Koto

Stade de l'Amitié, Dakar
Referee: El-Hadji Faye (Gambia)
30 November 1980

Sierra Leone	1–2	Senegal
Rappel		Goal

Freetown

Senegal won 4–1 on aggregate.

Equatorial Guinea	Cancelled	Benin
		Withdrew

Equatorial Guinea advanced after Benin withdrew.

Rwanda	Cancelled	Uganda
		Withdrew

Rwanda advanced after Uganda withdrew.

Upper Volta	Cancelled	Gabon
		Withdrew

Upper Volta advanced after Gabon withdrew.

=== First round ===
Team 1	Agg.	Team 2	1st leg	2nd leg
Morocco	8–1	Liberia	3–1	5–0
Kenya	3–7	Egypt	3–5	0–2
Cameroon	6–2	Togo	4–0	2–2
Zaire	5–4	Mozambique	2–1	3–3
Algeria	5–4	Mali	5–1	0–3
Ghana	2–1	Congo	1–1	1–0
Zimbabwe	0–3	Zambia	0–1	0–2
Tunisia	1–0	Senegal	1–0	0–0
Ethiopia	1–1 (4–3 p)	Rwanda	1–0	0–1
Guinea	w/o	Equatorial Guinea	—	—
Madagascar	w/o	Tanzania	—	—
Upper Volta	Bye			

22 March 1981

Morocco	3–1	Liberia
Boussati; Bouderbala		Goal

Hassan II Stadium, Fez
Referee: Bakary Sarr (Senegal)
4 April 1981

Liberia	0–5	Morocco
		Bouderbala

Antoinette Tubman Stadium, Monrovia
Referee: Benjamin Dwomoh (Ghana)

Morocco won 8–1 on aggregate.

4 April 1981

Kenya	3–5	Egypt
Oluoch 9'; Masiga 17'; Ingutia 28'		Hammouda 3'; Nur 22'; El Khatib 63'; El-Sayed 67', 82'

Nairobi City Stadium, Nairobi
Referee: Edwin Picon-Ackong (Mauritius)
18 April 1981

Egypt	2–0	Kenya
El-Badry; El Khatib

Cairo International Stadium, Cairo
Referee: Ali Bin Nasser (Tunisia)

Egypt won 7–3 on aggregate.

5 April 1981

Cameroon	4–0	Togo
Bahoken; Milla

Stade de la Réunification, Douala
Referee: ... (Algeria)
19 April 1981

Togo	2–2	Cameroon
Goal		Ebongué

Lomé
Referee: Dodou N'Jie (Gambia)

Cameroon won 6–2 on aggregate.

5 April 1981

Zaire	2–1	Mozambique

Stade du 20 Mai, Kinshasa
Referee: Théodore Koudou Poll (Ivory Coast)
19 April 1981

Mozambique	3–3	Zaire

Estádio da Machava, Maputo
Referee: Angelo Ratovonony (Madagascar)

Zaire won 5–4 on aggregate.

10 April 1981

Algeria	5–1	Mali
Bensaoula 18'; Guendouz 28'; Madjer 56', 71'; I. Traoré 72' (o.g.)		Bagayoko 12'

19 June Stadium, Oran
Attendance: 40,000
Referee: Tesfaye Gebreyesus (Ethiopia)
19 April 1981

Mali	3–0	Algeria
I. Traoré 27' (pen.); B. Traoré 29'; Bagayoko 85'

Stade Modibo Kéïta, Bamako
Attendance: 30,000

Algeria won 5–4 on aggregate.

11 April 1981

Ghana	1–1	Congo
Papa Arko (pen)		Mickey 45+1'

Baba Yara Sports Stadium, Kumasi
Attendance: 52,000
26 April 1981

Congo	0–1	Ghana
		Odamettey 25'

Stade Alphonse Massemba-Débat, Brazzaville
Referee: Winston Gumboh (Zambia)

Ghana won 2–1 on aggregate.

11 April 1981

Zimbabwe	0–1	Zambia

Rufaro Stadium, Salisbury
Referee: Billy Phambala (Malawi)
25 April 1981

Zambia	2–0	Zimbabwe

Lusaka
Referee: Hussein Fahmy Baheeg (Egypt)

Zambia won 3–0 on aggregate.

12 April 1981

Tunisia	1–0	Senegal
Jebali

Stade El Menzah, Tunis
Referee: Hassan Abdel Hafiz (Sudan)
26 April 1981

Senegal	0–0	Tunisia

Stade de l'Amitié, Dakar

Tunisia won 1–0 on aggregate.

26 April 1981

Ethiopia	1–0	Rwanda

Addis Ababa Stadium, Addis Ababa
Referee: Edward Bukenya (Uganda)
10 May 1981

Rwanda	1–0	Ethiopia
Penalties
	3–4

Kigali
Referee: Kambaji Kabongo (Zaire)

Ethiopia won 4–3 on penalty shootout after 1–1 on aggregate.

Guinea	Cancelled	Equatorial Guinea
		Withdrew

Guinea advanced after Equatorial Guinea withdrew.

Madagascar	Cancelled	Tanzania
		Withdrew

Madagascar advanced after Tanzania withdrew.

=== Second round ===
Team 1	Agg.	Team 2	1st leg	2nd leg
Guinea	3–3 (a)	Ethiopia	2–2	1–1
Ghana	4–3	Zaire	2–2	2–1
Cameroon	6–3	Madagascar	5–1	1–2
Morocco	2–3	Zambia	2–1	0–2
Algeria	8–1	Upper Volta	7–0	1–1
Tunisia	w/o	Egypt	—	—

28 June 1981

Guinea	2–2	Ethiopia

Stade du 28 Septembre, Conakry
4 October 1981

Ethiopia	1–1	Guinea

Addis Ababa Stadium, Addis Ababa

Ethiopia won by away goals rule after 3–3 on aggregate.

22 July 1981

Ghana	2–2	Zaire

Accra Sports Stadium, Accra
2 August 1981

Zaire	1–2	Ghana

Stade du 20 Mai, Kinshasa
Referee: Kabalamuna Chayu (Zambia)

Ghana won 4–3 on aggregate.

`

16 August 1981

Cameroon	5–1	Madagascar
M'Bida; Kundé; Aoudou; Djonkep; Milla

Ahmadou Ahidjo Stadium, Yaoundé
30 August 1981

Madagascar	2–1	Cameroon
Goal		M'Bida

Mahamasina Municipal Stadium, Antananarivo

Cameroon won 6–3 on aggregate.

16 August 1981

Morocco	2–1	Zambia
Limane 16'; Boussati 77'		Chola

Hassan II Stadium, Fez
30 August 1981

Zambia	2–0	Morocco
? Kaumba

Lusaka

Zambia won 3–2 on aggregate.

30 August 1981

Algeria	7–0	Upper Volta
Madjer 31', 37'; Belloumi 53', 56'; Aït El-Hocine 68', 80'; Assad 81'

19 June Stadium, Oran
Attendance: 50,000
Referee: Yousef Al-Ghoul (Libya)
20 September 1981

Upper Volta	1–1	Algeria
Ouattara 81'		Sidibé 18' (o.g.)

Stade Municipal, Ouagadougou
Referee: Benjamin Dwomoh (Ghana)

Algeria won 8–1 on aggregate.

Tunisia	Cancelled	Egypt
		Withdrew

Tunisia advanced after Egypt withdrew.

== Qualified teams ==
- Algeria
- Cameroon
- Ethiopia
- Ghana
- Libya (hosts)
- Nigeria (holders)
- Tunisia
- Zambia
