= Mesbah Shanqab =

Libyan footballer (born 1966)

Personal information
- Date of birth: 30 November 1966 (age 59)
- Place of birth: Benghazi, Libyan Arab Republic
- Position: Goalkeeper

Youth career
- 1978–1981: Al-Ahli Tripoli

Senior career*
Years	Team	Apps	(Gls)
1981–2000	Al-Ahli Tripoli	500+	

International career
1981	Libya youth		
1983–2000	Libya	23	(0)
Medal record
Men's Football
Representing Libya
Africa Cup of Nations
Runner-up	1982 Libya
- * Club domestic league appearances and goals

Mesbah Shanqab (Arabic: مصباح شنقب; born 30 November 1966) is a Libyan former footballer who played as a goalkeeper. He is considered one of the best goalkeepers in the history of Libyan football, and one of the best African and Arab goalkeepers of the 1980s and 1990s.

== Club career ==
In 1978, Shanqab joined the youth team of Al-Ahli Tripoli. He was promoted to the club's first team in 1981, and played for them in various continental competitions, including in the 1983 African Cup of Champions Clubs against JE Tizi Ouzou, the 1984 African Cup Winners' Cup, where he played eight matches as the club reached the final before withdrawing for political reasons, and the 1985 Arab Club Champions Cup against FAR Rabat. He was only given one red card in his career, during a match against Al-Ittihad, where he was sent off in the 52nd minute. During his career, he received offers from various European clubs to play for them, including teams in Malta and English club Liverpool, but he chose to stay at Al-Ahli Tripoli.

In 1994, he was made the club's captain, following the retirement of teammate Ayad Al-Qadi retired. Following Al-Ahli Tripoli's tenth league title win in 2000, the club's fans nicknamed the title the "Mesbah Shanqab Championship".

Overall, Shanqab played over 500 matches for Al-Ahli Tripoli, and is considered one of the most decorated player in the club's history. Additionally, he holds the Libyan Premier League record for the most consecutive clean sheets, spanning 1062 minutes in 1984.

== International career ==
In 1981, Shanqab was called up to represent Libya's youth national team against North Yemen. In 1982, at the age of 15, he was called up to the Libya national team for the 1982 African Cup of Nations, as the team's third goalkeeper. He made his Libya national team the following year, where he played the first half of a 4–0 win against Malta.

He also played for Libya at the Arab Games in 1985 and 1997, as well as the 1986, 1990, and 2002 FIFA World Cup qualifiers, and 1986 and 2002 African Cup of Nations qualifiers.

In 1992, he was awarded the title of second best goalkeeper in Africa, despite not playing international matches following sanctions implanted by the United Nations in March. The following year, France Football ranked him the third best goalkeeper in Africa.

== Coaching career ==
In 2021, he was appointed the goalkeeping coach of Al Ta'awon SC.

== Personal life ==
Following his retirement, Shanqab has criticized the reliance of foreign managers in the Libyan Premier League. In February 2016, he went missing under mysterious circumstances in Tripoli, with reports claiming that he was kidnapped by an armed group, although he was later found safe.
