= Emmanuel Osuigwe =

Nigerian footballer

Personal information
- Date of birth: 6 April 1952 (age 74)

International career
Years	Team	Apps	(Gls)
- Nigeria

Emmanuel Osuigwe (born 6 April 1952) is a Nigerian footballer. He competed in the men's tournament at the 1980 Summer Olympics.
