= Jacques Kinkomba Kingambo =

Congolese footballer

Personal information
- Date of birth: 4 January 1962 (age 64)
- Place of birth: Mabulu, Congo
- Position: Midfielder

Senior career*
Years	Team	Apps	(Gls)
1982–1984	Eendracht Aalst		
1984–1987	Royal F.C. Sérésien	49	(5)
1987–1992	Sint-Truiden		
1992–1995	R.F.C. de Liège	51	(1)
1995–1998	R.C.S. Verviétois		
1998–1999	R.J. Rochefortoise F.C.		

International career
1988–1994	Zaire	17	(0)
- * Club domestic league appearances and goals

Jacques Kinkomba Kingambo (born 4 January 1962) is a Congolese former professional footballer who played as a midfielder. He was a squad member at the 1988 and 1992 Africa Cup of Nations.
