= Joseph Koto =

Senegalese footballer and manager (1960–2021)

Personal information
- Full name: Marie Joseph François Koto
- Date of birth: 1 January 1960
- Date of death: 14 October 2021
- Position: Forward

International career
Years	Team	Apps	(Gls)
1980–1986	Senegal		

Managerial career
- 2011–2012: Senegal U23
- 2012: Senegal
Medal record
Men's football
Representing Senegal (as manager)
Africa U-20 Cup of Nations
Runner-up	2015
Runner-up	2017

Joseph Koto (1 January 1960 – 14 October 2021) was a Senegalese football manager and international player. He was head coach of the Senegal national football team between July 2012 and October 2012.
