= Idrissa Traoré (referee) =

Malian football referee

- Full name: Idrissa Traoré
- Born: Mali

Domestic
Years	League	Role

International
Years	League	Role

Idrissa Traoré is a former Malian football referee. He officiated the Group C match between Canada and the Soviet Union at the 1986 World Cup. He also officiated at the 1980, 1982, 1986, 1988 and 1990 African Cup of Nations. At the time of the start of the 1986 World Cup, he was 38 years old.
