= Peter Kaumba =

Zambian footballer and coach (born 1958)

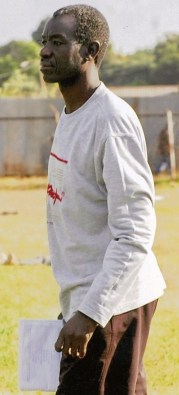
- Kaumba in 2012

Personal information
- Date of birth: 31 March 1958 (age 68)
- Place of birth: Kitwe, Northern Rhodesia
- Position: Winger

Youth career
- 1971–1974: UBZ

Senior career*
Years	Team	Apps	(Gls)
1975–1977	Mindola United		
1978–1983	Power Dynamos		
1984	Africa Sports		
1984–1985	Power Dynamos		

International career
1979–1983	Zambia		

Managerial career
- 1997–1998: Power Dynamos
- 1999–2002: Green Buffaloes
- 2002–2006: Kitwe United
- 2007: Zamtel
- 2009: Konkola Blades
- 2012–2013: NAPSA Stars
- * Club domestic league appearances and goals

Peter Kaumba (born 31 March, 1958) is a Zambian football coach and former player. He was voted the best winger at the 1982 African Cup of Nations, where Zambia finished third and he emerged as their top scorer. In 1982, he was named Zambia's Sportsman of the Year.

In 1984, his career was cut short by injury, and he became a coach, taking charge of several Zambian clubs.

== Early life ==
Kaumba was born in Kitwe, Zambia, where his father, White Kaumba, worked as a miner. He supported Rhokana United (now Nkana FC) as a boy and his hero was Godfrey 'Ucar' Chitalu. He attended Wusakile and Misheshi primary schools and completed his secondary education at Kitwe Boys Secondary School, graduating in 1976. He played as a left winger and occasional goalkeeper during the formative years of his career.

== Club career ==
In 1971, Kaumba joined an amateur team called UBZ which was sponsored by the United Bus Company of Zambia. He also played for Zambia Schools while at Kitwe Boys.

In 1975, he joined Mindola United and played a key role in the team's Division II championship victory the following season, which secured their promotion to Division I. He was the club's top scorer, netting 39 goals. After Mindola United was relegated following one season in the top division, he transferred to Power Dynamos in 1977, where he made an impact with the FAZ Division III champions.

He helped Dynamos gain promotion to the First Division when they won the title, spending only one season in Division II. He won his first piece of silverware in a 7–6 penalty shoot-out Independence Cup win over Ndola United in October 1979.

The following year, Alex Chola joined Dynamos. Dynamos, who were dubbed "a baby born with teeth," retained the Independence Cup with a 2–0 victory over Green Buffaloes. In the second minute of the game, Kaumba scored the first goal, but had to withdraw with a dislocated arm five minutes into the second half.

Despite being an attacking midfielder, Kaumba was a prolific goal-scorer. He could switch to the right wing when needed.

Nicknamed '’Abaleya'’ – a popular call by Copperbelt mini-bus conductors to lure customers which means 'those who are going'.

In 1982, Dynamos played in the African Cup Winners Cup. They reached the final, where they lost to the Egyptian club Arab Contractors. Kaumba emerged as the league's top scorer with 35 goals and was rewarded with the Footballer of the Year award, as well as the Sportsman of the Year trophy. To date, he is the only man to win all three awards in the same season. He earned 5th place in the African Footballer of the Year award, which was won that year by Cameroonian goalkeeper Thomas N'kono. In his time with Dynamos, he won the league, the Independence Cup, and the Champion of Champions Cup. He was also part of the Dynamos team that won the Rothman's Cup in 1983 in Ivory Coast.

That same year, Zambian coach Wiesław Grabowski described both Kaumba and Chola as world-class players. In 1983, Kaumba successfully attended trials with French second division side AS Cannes, but while contract negotiations were going on, his agent told him of another offer in Ivory Coast and advised him to sign. In December of that year, he and Chola signed three-year contracts with Ivorian club Africa Sports The duo made an impact, but the stint only lasted 7 months due to the withdrawal of a major sponsor of the club. Both players returned to help Dynamos clinch their first ever league title in 1984. In August, Kaumba suffered knee ligament damage in an Independence Cup semi-final against Kabwe Warriors at Kafubu Stadium in Luanshya which forced him to retire from football.

== International career ==
Kaumba was called up to the Zambia national team by Brian Tiler, and scored a last-minute goal in a CAN qualifier against Malawi on 15 April 1979 in Blantyre, leading to a 2–0 victory.

A month before the Moscow Olympic Games, he suffered an injury in a friendly match against Zimbabwe in Lusaka which made him miss the tournament. In August 1981, he scored a crucial goal that qualified Zambia to CAN 1982 in a 2–0 victory over Morocco which gave Zambia a 3–2 aggregate victory.

He was Zambia's highest scoring player at the tournament, scoring three goals, one fewer than the tournament's top scorer, Ghana's George Alhassan. He was chosen among the eleven best players of the tournament by a panel of African Sports journalists who covered the tournament. Later that year, Kaumba struck twice when Zambia beat Egypt 5–3 in Cairo to win the CAF Silver Jubilee tournament.

He scored against Egypt again in an Olympic Games qualifier in Lusaka on 9 October 1983 in a 1–0 win with a late goal off Chola's free-kick although Zambia lost the return leg 2–0 in Cairo. Kaumba quit football when his career was curtailed by a serious knee injury late in 1984 and took up coaching.

== Coaching career ==
When Kaumba's career ended, he concentrated on working for ZCCM Power Division in the Accounts Section until he was appointed assistant coach to Alex Chola at Dynamos in 1988, a position he held until 1989 when he was given the task of heading youth football at the club. In 1994, the Football Association of Zambia (FAZ) attached him to the U-20 national team as assistant coach.

When Dynamos coach Webby Chilufya was fired at the end of the 1996 season, the team's management hired Kaumba to lead the club as head coach. Appointed in early 1997, he led Dynamos to the league title after leading the table from the first day of the season to the last. The following year, he was relieved of his duties just four months after winning the league when Dynamos players reportedly revolted when they were left out of the home ownership empowerment scheme at ZCCM Power Division and management accused him of inciting the players.

He continued in his role as U-20 assistant coach and was part of Zambia's coaching bench at both the African Junior championship and the World Youth Cup in 1999 under Patrick Phiri.

When Green Buffaloes were faced with relegation following their return to the top flight in 1999, they hired him to replace George Chikokola and he managed to stave off relegation. In 2000, he guided Buffaloes to the final of the Mosi Cup which they lost to Nkana 7–6 on post-match penalties. He also led Buffaloes to a 6th-place finish.

The following season, Kaumba was replaced with Guston Mutobo with Buffaloes in second position with 7 wins, a draw and 3 defeats after 11 games in mid-June. Reasons given were that he did not heed advice from Buffaloes technical bench and often stuck to his favourite players regardless of their form, to which he responded that he was the coach who was always with the players during training and was therefore responsible for picking the team. His departure led to a number of players expressing interest in leaving Buffaloes. It also began a slide and by September, the team was in eighth position on the table with only one win in 9 league matches, prompting the dismissal of the man who had done away with Kaumba's services, Lt. Colonel Dan Chambaila, and Mutobo, leading to the return of Kaumba who expressed happiness at the move.

In May 2002, he resigned from Buffaloes barely 6 weeks into the new season, in an apparent response to pressure from fans, who harassed him after his team lost to lowly Zamsure in Lusaka. The club were disappointed by his move, but stated that they would not stand in his way. He took over at Kitwe United on their return to the top league after 25 years and led them to 7th position at the end of the season. Two seasons later, he was in charge for a BP Top 8 Cup final win in a 1–0 victory over favourites Zanaco in Lusaka, ending a 35-year drought and dedicated the victory to the club's supporters and sponsors. Kaumba also doubled as coach of the U-23 national team and took them to the semi-finals of the 2003 All Africa Games in Abuja, Nigeria, with a squad that included Christopher Katongo, Kennedy Mweene, Stophira Sunzu, Kalililo Kakonje, Isaac Chansa and Collins Mbesuma. He was also elevated to assistant coach at senior national team under Patrick Phiri. He had the opportunity to coach Tanzanian club Simba S.C., but declined the offer when it did not meet his expectations.

When United dropped to Division II in 2006, Kaumba moved to newly promoted Zamtel the following year, but after six points won from 11 games, his contract was terminated, with the team at the bottom of the log.

Kaumba concentrated on coaching the U-23 national team, though Zambia lost to Ivory Coast in the Beijing 2008 race. He once again led the team to the semi-finals of the 2007 All Africa Games in Algeria. The following year, Kaumba took charge of the Zambian CHAN team on a temporary basis in qualifying matches against Swaziland and Botswana. He coached Konkola Blades in 2009, but resigned after six months after facing more interference in his duties and, at times, going for months without getting paid.

When NAPSA Stars won promotion to the FAZ Premier League in 2011, Kaumba joined them as assistant coach to Patrick Phiri. In October 2012, Phiri was sidelined and he took over the reins as acting coach, and won the Barclays Cup 4–2 in a penalty shootout after poor defending by both teams culminated in a 4–4 draw at full-time.

The following year, NAPSA flirted with relegation and ended the season one place and three points above the relegation zone. At the end of the season, Kaumba left his role as coach in what the club called an 'amicable parting of company.'

== Personal life ==
Kaumba became a widower after losing his wife in 2001. He has three children – Jennings, Womba and Charles.

== Honours ==
=== Player ===
- Zambian Division II League Title: 1976, 1978
- Independence Cup: 1979, 1980
- Champion of Champions: 1980, 1981
- Rothmans Cup: 1983
- Zambian League Title: 1984

Zambia

- CAF Silver Jubilee Tournament (Cairo)

=== Coach ===
- Zambian league title: 1997
- Zambian BP Top Eight Cup: 2004
- Barclays Cup: 2012

=== Individual ===
- Zambian Footballer of the Year: 1982
- Zambian League Top Scorer: 1982
- Zambian Sportsman of the Year: 1982
- Runner-up African footballer of the Year: 1982
