= 1982 African Cup of Nations =

13th edition of the Africa Cup of Nations

كأس أمم إفريقيا 1982
- ACN 1982 official logo

Tournament details
- Host country: Libya
- Dates: 5–19 March
- Teams: 8
- Venues: 2 (in 2 host cities)

Final positions
- Champions: Ghana (4th title)
- Runners-up: Libya
- Third place: Zambia
- Fourth place: Algeria

Tournament statistics
- Matches played: 16
- Goals scored: 32 (2 per match)
- Top scorer(s): (Ghana) George Alhassan (4 goals)
- Best player: (Libya) Fawzi Al-Issawi

The 1982 African Cup of Nations was the 13th edition of the African Cup of Nations, the international football championship run by the Confederation of African Football (CAF). It was hosted by Libya. Just like in 1980, there were eight teams, which were split into two groups of four.

Ghana won a record fourth championship, defeating Libya 7−6 on penalties in the final following a 1–1 draw.

== Qualified teams ==
The 8 qualified teams are:

Team	Qualified as	Qualified on	Previous appearances in tournament (Note: Bold indicates champion for that year, Italic indicates host.)
Libya	Hosts		0 (debut)
Nigeria	Holders	22 March 1980	4 (1963, 1976, 1978, **1980**)
Ghana	2nd round winners	2 August 1981	6 (**1963**, **1965**, 1968, 1970, **1978**, 1980)
Cameroon	2nd round winners	30 August 1981	2 (1970, 1972)
Zambia	2nd round winners	30 August 1981	2 (1974, 1978)
Algeria	2nd round winners	20 September 1981	2 (1968, 1980)
Ethiopia	2nd round winners	4 October 1981	8 (1957, 1959, **1962**, 1963, 1965, 1968, 1970, 1976)
Tunisia	2nd round winners	1981	4 (1962, 1963, 1965, 1978)

== Venues ==
The competition was played in two venues in Tripoli and Benghazi.

1982 African Cup of Nations is located in Libya	Tripoli
1982 African Cup of Nations is located in Libya	11 June Stadium
1982 African Cup of Nations is located in Libya	Capacity: **67,000**
1982 African Cup of Nations is located in Libya	Benghazi
1982 African Cup of Nations is located in Libya	28 March Stadium
1982 African Cup of Nations is located in Libya	Capacity: **40,000**

== Group stage ==
=== Tiebreakers ===
If two or more teams finished level on points after completion of the group matches, the following tie-breakers were used to determine the final ranking:

1. Goal difference in all group matches
2. Greater number of goals scored in all group matches
3. Drawing of lots

=== Group A ===
Pos	Team	Pld	W	D	L	GF	GA	GD	Pts	Qualification
1	Libya (H)	3	1	2	0	4	2	+2	**4**	Advance to Knockout stage
2	Ghana	3	1	2	0	3	2	+1	**4**	Advance to Knockout stage
3	Cameroon	3	0	3	0	1	1	0	**3**	
4	Tunisia	3	0	1	2	1	4	−3	**1**	

Rules for classification: Group stage tiebreakers
(H) Hosts
5 March 1982

Libya	2–2	Ghana
Jaranah 58'; Al-Issawi 76'	Report	Alhassan 28'; Opoku Nti 89'

11 June Stadium, Tripoli
Attendance: 45,200
Referee: Sohan Ramlochun (Mauritius)
5 March 1982

Cameroon	1–1	Tunisia
M'Bida 61'	Report	Gabsi 60'

11 June Stadium, Tripoli
Attendance: 45,000
Referee: Bakary Sarr (Senegal)

9 March 1982

Cameroon	0–0	Ghana
	Report

11 June Stadium, Tripoli
Attendance: 40,000
Referee: Mohamed Larache (Morocco)
9 March 1982

Libya	2–0	Tunisia
Seddik 42' (o.g.); Al-Bor'osi 89'	Report

11 June Stadium, Tripoli
Attendance: 40,000
Referee: Kambaji Kabongo (Zaire)

12 March 1982

Ghana	1–0	Tunisia
John Ebow Essien 28'	Report

11 June Stadium, Tripoli
Attendance: 40,000
Referee: Idrissa Traoré (Mali)
12 March 1982

Libya	0–0	Cameroon
	Report

11 June Stadium, Tripoli
Attendance: 40,000
Referee: Babacar Fall (Senegal)

=== Group B ===
Pos	Team	Pld	W	D	L	GF	GA	GD	Pts	Qualification
1	Algeria	3	2	1	0	3	1	+2	**5**	Advance to Knockout stage
2	Zambia	3	2	0	1	4	1	+3	**4**	Advance to Knockout stage
3	Nigeria	3	1	0	2	4	5	−1	**2**	
4	Ethiopia	3	0	1	2	0	4	−4	**1**	

Rules for classification: Group stage tiebreakers
7 March 1982

Nigeria	3–0	Ethiopia
Keshi 27', 84'; Adeshina 40'	Report

28 March Stadium, Benghazi
Attendance: 5,000
Referee: Bester Kalombo (Malawi)
7 March 1982

Algeria	1–0	Zambia
Merzekane 85'	Report

28 March Stadium, Benghazi
Attendance: 5,000
Referee: Dodou N'Jie (Gambia)

10 March 1982

Zambia	1–0	Ethiopia
Munshya 68'	Report

28 March Stadium, Benghazi
Attendance: 5,000
Referee: Bashir Mahamed Jama
10 March 1982

Algeria	2–1	Nigeria
Isima 44' (o.g.); Assad 65'	Report	Osigwe 40'

28 March Stadium, Benghazi
Attendance: 5,000
Referee: Cheikh Djibril MBaye (Senegal)

13 March 1982

Algeria	0–0	Ethiopia
	Report

28 March Stadium, Benghazi
Attendance: 5,000
Referee: Hugues Opangault
13 March 1982

Zambia	3–0	Nigeria
Kaumba 25'; Njovu 80'; Fregene 81' (o.g.)	Report

28 March Stadium, Benghazi
Attendance: 5,000
Referee: Edwin Picon-Ackong (Mauritius)

== Knockout stage ==
=== Bracket ===
Semi-finals
16 March – Benghazi
**Ghana (a.e.t.)**	**3**
Algeria	2
16 March – Tripoli
**Libya**	**2**
Zambia	1

Final
19 March – Tripoli
**Ghana (p)**	**1 (7)**
Libya	1 (6)
Third place
18 March – Tripoli
Algeria	0
**Zambia**	**2**

=== Semi-finals ===
16 March 1982

Ghana	3–2 (a.e.t.)	Algeria
Alhassan 4', 103'; Opoku Nti 90'	Report	Zidane 29'; Assad 62'

28 March Stadium, Benghazi
Attendance: 5,000
Referee: Bester Kalombo (Malawi)

16 March 1982

Libya	2–1	Zambia
Al-Beshari 38', 84'	Report	29' Kaumba

11 June Stadium, Tripoli
Attendance: 50,000
Referee: Bakary Sarr (Senegal)

=== Third place match ===
18 March 1982

Zambia	2–0	Algeria
Kaumba 2'; Munshya 25'	Report

11 June Stadium, Tripoli
Attendance: 2,000
Referee: Cheikh Djibril MBaye (Senegal)

=== Final ===
19 March 1982

Ghana	1–1 (a.e.t.)	Libya
Alhassan 35'	Report	Al-Beshari 70'
Penalties
Lamptey (penalty scored); Alhassan (penalty scored); Paha (penalty scored); Asaase (penalty scored); Abbrey (penalty scored); Mensah (penalty missed); Quarshie (penalty scored); Afriyie (penalty scored)	7–6	(penalty scored) Al-Beshari; (penalty scored) Sola; (penalty scored) Al-Ajeli; (penalty scored) Ben-Suleiman; (penalty scored) Al-Farjani; (penalty missed) Ghonaïm; (penalty scored) Jaranah; (penalty missed) Zeiyu

11 June Stadium, Tripoli
Attendance: 50,000
Referee: Sohan Ramlochun (Mauritius)

== Goalscorers ==
There were 32 goals scored in 16 matches, for an average of 2 goals per match.

4 goals

- (Ghana) George Alhassan

3 goals

- (Libya) Ali Al-Beshari
- (Zambia) Peter Kaumba

2 goals

- (Algeria) Salah Assad
- (Ghana) Samuel Opoku Nti
- (Nigeria) Stephen Keshi
- (Zambia) Godfrey Munshya

1 goal

- (Algeria) Chaabane Merzekane
- (Algeria) Djamel Zidane
- (Cameroon) Grégoire Mbida
- (Ghana) John Essien
- (Libya) Faraj Al-Barasi
- (Libya) Fawzi Al-Issawi
- (Libya) Abdel Razak Jaranah
- (Nigeria) Ademola Adeshina
- (Nigeria) Emmanuel Osigwe
- (Zambia) Aaron Njovu
- (Tunisia) Kamel Gabsi

1 own goal

- (Nigeria) Peter Fregene (against Zambia)
- (Nigeria) Okey Isima (against Algeria)
- (Tunisia) Kamel Seddik (against Libya)

== Team of the Tournament ==
Goalkeeper	Defenders	Midfielders	Forwards
(Cameroon) Thomas Nkono	(Algeria) Chaabane Merzekane (Ghana) Sampson Lamptey (Ghana) Haruna Yusif (Libya) Ali Al-Beshari	(Ghana) George Alhassan (Ghana) Samuel Opoku Nti (Ghana) Emmanuel Quarshie (Libya) Fawzi Al-Issawi	(Algeria) Salah Assad (Algeria) Rabah Madjer
