= Haruna Yusif =

Ghanaian footballer

Personal information
- Place of birth: Ghana
- Position: Left-back

Senior career*
Years	Team	Apps	(Gls)
- Kumasi Cornerstones
- Asante Kotoko

International career
1978–1982	Ghana	9	(0)
Medal record
Representing Ghana
Men's football
Africa Cup of Nations
Winner	1978 Ghana
- * Club domestic league appearances and goals

Haruna Yusif is a Ghanaian former professional footballer. During his playing career he played as a defender specially as a left-back for Kumasi Cornerstones and Kumasi Asante Kotoko. At the international level, he is known for his involvement in the squad that won the 1978 African Cup of Nations and 1982 African Cup of Nations.

== Club career ==
Yusif played for Kumasi Cornerstones in 1978 before joining Kumasi Asante Kotoko, where he played from 1978 until he retired in 1990.

== International career ==
Yusif played for the Ghana national team. He was a key member of the squad that played at the 1978, 1980 and 1982 African Cup of Nations helping Ghana to make history as the first country to win the competition three times and for keeps during the 1978 edition, after scoring Uganda 2–0 in the finals.

== Honours ==
Asante Kotoko

- Ghana Premier League: 1980, 1981, 1982, 1983, 1986, 1987, 1988–89
- Ghanaian FA Cup: 1978, 1984
- African Cup of Champions Clubs: 1983

Ghana

- African Cup of Nations: 1978, 1982

Individual

- Africa Cup of Nations Team of the Tournament: 1982
