= Faraj Al-Barasi =

Libyan footballer (1960-1989)

Personal information
- Date of birth: 1960
- Place of birth: Kingdom of Libya
- Date of death: 11 August 1989 (aged 28–29)
- Place of death: Benghazi, Libya
- Position: Forward

Senior career*
Years	Team	Apps	(Gls)
–1989	Al-Nasr		

International career
- Libya
Medal record
Men's Football
Representing Libya
Africa Cup of Nations
Runner-up	1982 Libya
- * Club domestic league appearances and goals

Faraj Al-Barasi (Arabic: فرج البرعصي; could be transliterated as Bor'osi; Borosi; or Barassi; 1960–11 August 1989), was a Libyan footballer who played as a forward. He scored a goal in the 1982 Africa Cup of Nations in Libya.

Al-Barasi died in a road accident on 8 November 1989.

== Honours ==
Libya

- African Cup of Nations: runner-up, 1982
