= Emmanuel Quarshie =

Ghanaian footballer (1954–2013)

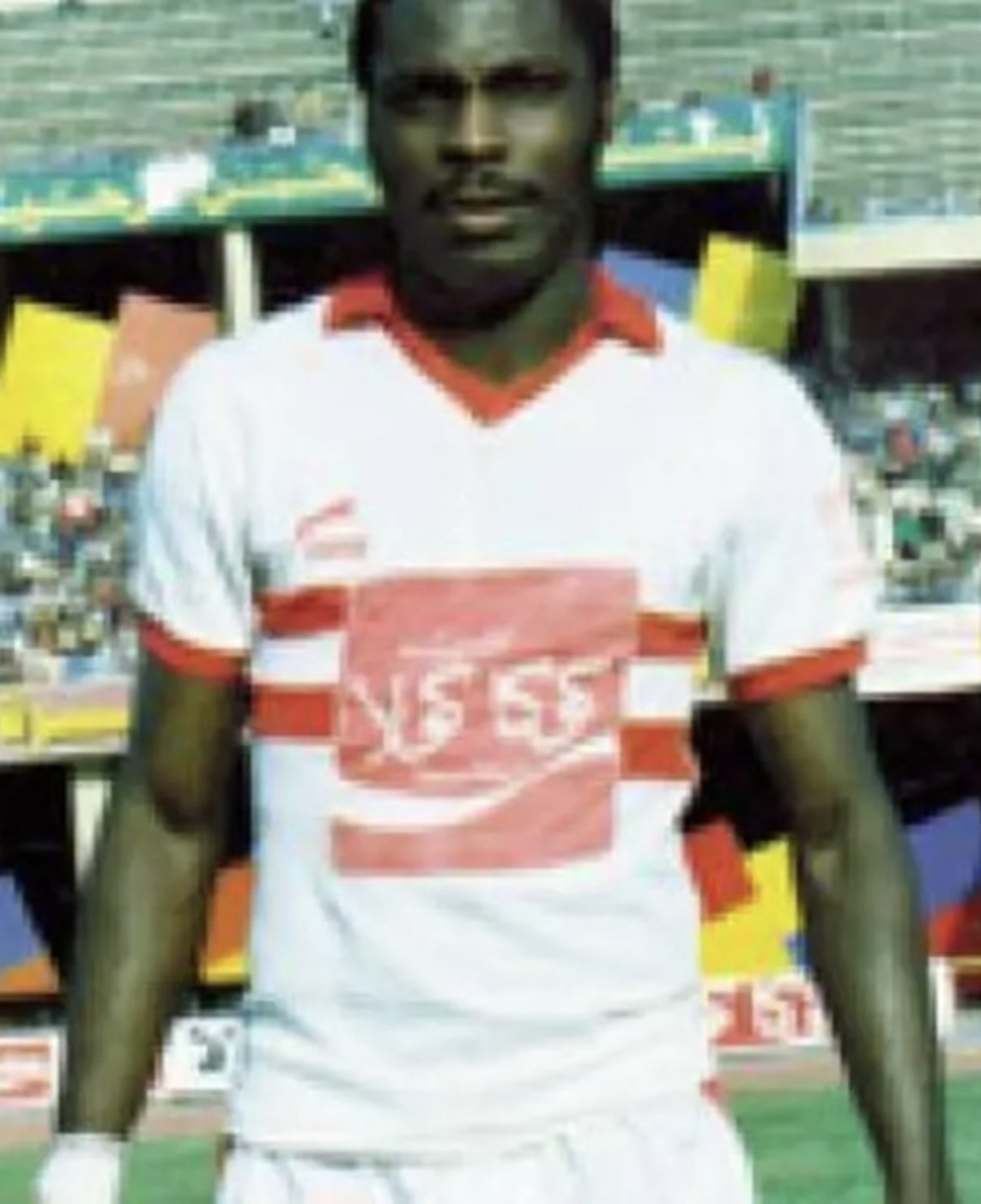
- Quarshie with Zamalek in 1983

Personal information
- Full name: Emmanuel Mohamed Quarshie
- Date of birth: 6 May 1953
- Date of death: 16 September 2013 (aged 60)
- Place of death: Takoradi, Ghana
- Position: Midfielder

Senior career*
Years	Team	Apps	(Gls)
1977–1983	Sekondi Hasaacas		
1983–1985	Zamalek		
1985–1990	Al-Muharraq		
1990–1992	FC 105 Libreville		

International career
1976–1985	Ghana		

Managerial career
- 2001–2002: Sekondi Hasaacas
- 2007–2013: All Stars
Medal record
Representing Ghana
Men's football
Africa Cup of Nations
Winner	1982 Libya
Winner	1978 Ghana
- * Club domestic league appearances and goals

Emmanuel Quarshie (6 May 1953 – 16 September 2013) was a Ghanaian international footballer and a coach who played as an attacking midfielder.

== Career ==
Quarshie played one game in 1978 African Cup of Nations. He was the captain of Ghana's champion selection in 1982 African Cup of Nations with five games played. At club level, he was the captain of Sekondi Hasaacas, with whom he won the West African Club Championship in 1982. He then moved to Egypt and joined Zamalek SC, winning its first African Cup of Champion Clubs in 1984. He played the last years of his career in Bahrain's Al-Muharraq.

He then became coach of Sekondi Hasaacas from 2001 to 2002 and All Stars from 2007 to 2013.

== Death ==
Quarshie was hospitalized in Egypt in July 2013 with the help of Zamalek. He died on 16 September at the age of 60 years, in Takoradi.

== Honors ==
Sekondi Hasaacas

- Ghana Premier League: 1977
- WAFU Cup: 1982
- SWAG Cup: 1982–83

Zamalek

- Egyptian Premier League: 1983–84
- African Cup of Champions Clubs: 1984

Ghana

- African Cup of Nations: 1978, 1982
