= Sampson Lamptey =

Ghanaian footballer

Personal information
- Full name: Sampson Stanley Lamptey
- Date of birth: 15 April 1958 (age 68)
- Place of birth: Accra, Ghana
- Position: Defender

Senior career*
| Years | Team | Apps | (Gls) |
| 1973 | Ghanacan | | |
| 1974–1976 | Asante Kotoko | | |
| 1977–1979 | GIHOC Stars | | |
| 1980–1982 | Hearts of Oak | | |
| 1982–1983 | Africa Sports | | |
| 1984–1987 | Hearts of Oak | | |
| 1988–1989 | Asante Kotoko | | |

International career
| 1982–1985 | Ghana | 13 | (0) |
- * Club domestic league appearances and goals

Sampson Stanley "Gaddafi" Lamptey is a Ghanaian former footballer who played as a defender. He was part of the Ghana squad that won the 1982 African Cup of Nations. He was included in the competition's Team of the Tournament.

He was nicknamed "Gaddafi" after late Libyan leader Muammar Gaddafi for his similar looks.

== Honours ==
Ghana

- African Cup of Nations: 1982

Individual

- African Cup of Nations Team of the Tournament: 1982
