= Tripoli Stadium =

Stadium in Tripoli, Libya

Coordinates: 32°51′36″N 13°8′9″E

Tripoli International Stadium
- ملعب طرابلس الدولي
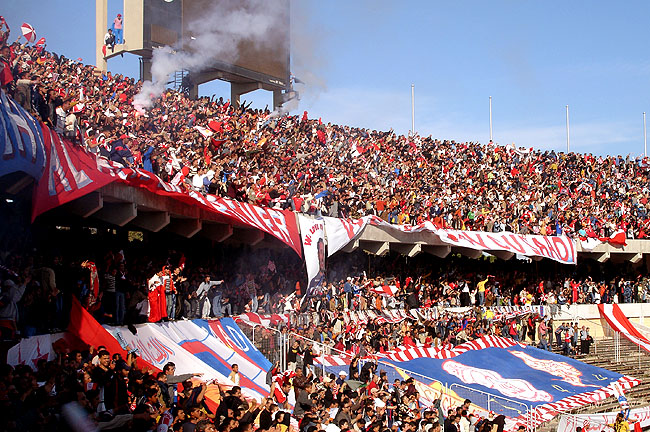
- Crowd at the stadium in 2007
- Interactive map of Tripoli International Stadium
- Former names: June 11 Stadium
- Location: Tripoli, Libya
- Capacity: 50,000
- Surface: GrassMaster
- Field size: 72 metres (79 yd) by 107 metres (117 yd)

Construction
- Opened: 1970
- Renovated: 2024

Tenants
- Libya national football team Al-Ittihad SCSC; Al-Ahli Tripoli; Al-Madina SC

The Tripoli International Stadium (Arabic: ملعب طرابلس) is a multi-purpose stadium in Tripoli, Libya. It can hold 50,000 spectators.

It is the main venue used by the Libyan national football team in its FIFA World Cup and African Nations Cup qualifying matches as well as friendlies and other international games.

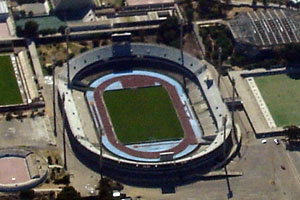
Tripoli Stadium

The stadium hosted many games of the 1982 African Cup of Nations held in Libya along with the 28 March Stadium in Benghazi; it was the venue for the final between Ghana and Libya. It hosted the 2002 Italian Supercup between Juventus and Parma, which Juventus won, 2–1.

Its old name, June 11 Stadium, is a reference to the date of the withdrawal of US forces from Libya, June 11, 1970.

The stadium recently underwent a renovation that was completed on the 8th of March 2024. The renovated stadium reopened with a match between AC Milan All-Stars and Libya All-Stars, which took place in front of more than 50,000 spectators.

Although Libyan top-flight league matches have generally been held in front of very small crowds due to restrictions since 2011, both Al-Ahly Tripoli and Al-Ittihad SCSC attracted full-capacity crowds of 50,000 at the Tripoli Stadium during CAF Champions League fixtures in 2025.

== See also ==
- Al Kremiah Stadium, Tripoli

Preceded by National Stadium; Lagos	African Cup of Nations; Final Venue; 1982	Succeeded by Stade Félix Houphouët-Boigny; Abidjan
