= Ali Al-Beshari =

Libyan footballer (born 1962)

Personal information
- Full name: Ali Al-Beshari
- Date of birth: 1962 (age 63–64)
- Position: Defender

Senior career*
Years	Team	Apps	(Gls)
1977–1997	Al Ahly Benghazi		

International career
1980–1992	Libya		
Medal record
Men's Football
Representing Libya
Africa Cup of Nations
Runner-up	1982 Libya
- * Club domestic league appearances and goals

Ali Al-Beshari (Arabic: علي البشاري), (born 1962) could be transliterated as Bshari, is a Libyan footballer. He scored three goals in the 1982 African cup of nations in Libya, which made him the tournament's second leading goalscorer (after Ghana's George Alhassan).

He scored for Al-Ahly more than 40 goals, and nine goals for the national team in more than 60 matches.

== Honours ==
Libya

- African Cup of Nations: runner-up, 1982

== Links ==
Ali Al-Beshari at Fifa.com.
