= Isaac Paha =

Ghanaian footballer and coach

Personal information
- Date of birth: 23 May 1953 (age 73)
- Place of birth: Ghana
- Position: Defender

Senior career*
Years	Team	Apps	(Gls)
1979–1989	Sekondi Hasaacas		

International career
1981–1984	Ghana	15	(0)

Managerial career
- 1993: Ghana U17
- 2004–2008: Ghana women's
- * Club domestic league appearances and goals

Isaac Paha is a Ghanaian football coach and former player, he played with Sekondi Hasaacas in the 1980s.

== Playing career ==
Paha is a former member of the Black Stars and was the captain of the team in 1984.

== Coaching career ==
His most recent coaching position was with the Ghana women's national football team, which he was sacked from in March 2008.

== Personal life ==
Paha is the younger brother of fellow professional football P.S.K. Paha, who served as the assistant captain when the Black Stars won the 1978 African Cup of Nations, the 3rd title for Ghana.
