= Fawzi Al-Issawi =

Libyan footballer (born 1960)

Personal information
- Full name: Fawzi Omar Ahmed Al-Issawi
- Date of birth: 27 February 1960 (age 66)
- Place of birth: Benghazi, Libya
- Position: Midfielder

Youth career
- 1970–1976: Al-Nasr SC

Senior career*
Years	Team	Apps	(Gls)
1976–1997	Al-Nasr SC	657	(255)

International career
1977–1985	Libya	90	(40)

Managerial career
- 2018: Al-Nasr SC
- 2018–2019: Libya
Medal record
Men's Football
Representing Libya
Africa Cup of Nations
Runner-up	1982 Libya
- * Club domestic league appearances and goals

Fawzi Omar Ahmed Al-Issawi (Arabic: فوزي العيساوي; born 27 February 1960) is a Libyan former footballer who played as a midfielder. He was awarded best player of 1982 African Cup of Nations.

== Honours ==
=== Player ===
Al-Nasr SC

- Libyan Premier League: 1987; runner-up 1978, 1984
- Libyan Cup: 1997

Libya

- African Cup of Nations: runner-up, 1982
- Islamic Tournament Cup: 1980
- School Cup: 1977

=== Individual ===
- Best player of the 1982 African Cup of Nations
- Best scorer of the 1985 African Cup Winners' Cup with 5 goals
- Best player of the century in Libya
