= Opoku Nti =

Ghanaian footballer (born 1961)

Personal information
- Full name: Samuel Opoku Nti
- Date of birth: 23 January 1961 (age 65)
- Place of birth: Kumasi, Ghana
- Position: Forward

Senior career*
Years	Team	Apps	(Gls)
1980–1985	Asante Kotoko		
1985–1986	Servette	17	(4)
1986–1989	Aarau		
1989–1990	Baden		
1990–1992	FC Glarus		

International career
1981–1992	Ghana	45	(12)
- * Club domestic league appearances and goals

Samuel Opoku Nti (born 23 January 1961) is a Ghanaian former professional footballer who played as a forward.

== Biography ==
Opoku Nti was born in Kumasi. He is generally considered to have been Ghana's top footballer in the early to mid-1980s; before the international advent of Abedi Pele. Opoku Nti featured in Ghana's victorious 1982 African cup winning side as well as the unsuccessful 1984 squad; which was eliminated in the 1st round of the competition. In the 1992 African Cup, he was controversially left on the substitutes bench for the majority of the tournament in favour of Mohammed Gargo, Stanley Aboraa, and Nii Lamptey - all of whom were considerably less experienced than Nti.

His nickname is "Zico," in honour of the Brazilian footballer and 1983 FIFA player of the year. In 1983 Opoku Nti, while playing for Asante Kotoko, finished as runner-up for the prestigious France Football African Footballer of the Year award. The African Sportswriters Association named him Africa's best player, in the same year. This was the year that Opoku Nti's match-winning goal made Asante Kotoko win the Africa Clubs Championship by beating Egypt's Al-Ahly in the final at Kumasi. It was one of the most memorable goals in Ghana soccer.

In 1984 Opoku Nti moved to Swiss champions Servette FC. After spending just one season with the club and falling out with the coach, Nti moved to Ottmar Hitzfeld's FC Aarau, where he spent the next three seasons, before moving to another Swiss side FC Baden. he was the manager of FC Africa n football team.
