= George Alhassan =

Ghanaian footballer

Personal information
- Full name: George "Jair" Alhassan
- Date of birth: 11 November 1955 (age 70)
- Place of birth: Kumasi, Ghana
- Position: Forward

Senior career*
Years	Team	Apps	(Gls)
1974–1982	Great Olympics	325	(78)
1982–1984	FC 105	–	(–)
1984	Hyundai Horangi	11	(4)
1985–1990	Great Olympics	–	(–)
1990–1992	Berchem Sport	–	(–)

International career
1970–1990	Ghana	17	(7)
- * Club domestic league appearances and goals

George Alhassan, nicknamed Jair, referring to Jairzinho, is a retired Ghanaian footballer. He is best known for his exploits in the 1982 Africa Cup of Nations which saw him lift the trophy for the second time in his career. During his career he played in Ghana, Gabon and Korea.

He was given the nickname Jair, due to a similar style of play to the Brazilian player Jairzinho.

== Club career ==
Alhassan played for Accra Great Olympics from 1974 to 1982 and later returned to play in 1985 to 1990. In the process he won the Ghana Premier League in his debut season in 1974. From 1982 to 1984, he played for FC 105 Libreville in Gabon, where he won two trophies, the Gabon Championnat National D1 in 1983 and the Coupe du Gabon Interclubs in 1984.

== International career ==
Alhassan made several appearances for the Ghana national football team, including qualifying matches for several FIFA World Cups. In 1978, he played for the Ghana squad who won the African Cup of Nations in home soil. Four years later he helped Ghana regain the title successfully, being the top scorer of the tournament with four goals, including two against Algeria in the semifinal and one in the final against hosts Libya.

== Personal life ==
George is the father of Kalif Alhassan, a professional football player in the United States with Tampa Bay Rowdies.

== After retirement ==
In October 2020, he was appointed as the Welfare Officer of his former club Accra Great Olympics.

== Honours ==
=== Club ===
Great Olympics

- Ghana Premier League: 1974

FC 105 Libreville

- Gabon Championnat National D1: 1983
- Coupe du Gabon Interclubs: 1984

=== International ===
Ghana

- African Cup of Nations: 1978, 1982

=== Individual ===
- African Cup of Nations Golden boot: 1982
- Africa Cup of Nations Team of the Tournament: 1982
- Ghana Premier League Top scorer: 1977, 1985
