= 1978 African Cup of Nations squads =

Below is a list of squads used in the 1978 African Cup of Nations.

== Group A ==
=== Ghana ===
Coach: Fred Osam-Duodu

No.	Pos.	Player	Date of birth (age)	Caps	Club
1	GK	Joseph Carr			(Ghana) Hasaacas
2	DF	P.S.K. Paha	1951		(Ghana) Eleven Wise
3	DF	Emmanuel Ofei Ansah	12 April 1953 (aged 24)		(Ghana) Hearts of Oak
4	MF	Awuley Quaye (c)	1954		(Ghana) Great Olympics
5	DF	James Kuuku Dadzie			(Ghana) Hasaacas
6	FW	Adolf Armah			(Ghana) Hearts of Oak
7	MF	John Nketia Yawson			(Ghana) Eleven Wise
8	FW	George Alhassan	11 November 1955 (aged 22)		(Ghana) Great Olympics
9	FW	Opoku Afriyie	29 January 1945 (aged 33)		(Ghana) Asante Kotoko
10	MF	Karim Abdul Razak	18 April 1956 (aged 21)		(Ghana) Asante Kotoko
11	MF	Mohammed Polo	11 November 1956 (aged 21)		(Ghana) Hearts of Oak
12	GK	Fuseini Salifu			(Ghana) Asante Kotoko
13	DF	Haruna Yusif			(Ghana) Cornerstone
14	DF	Isaac Acquaye	1953		(Ghana) Dumas Boys
15	FW	Dan Kayede			(Ghana) Great Olympics
16	GK	Abdulai Chesco			(Ghana) SS 1974
17	FW	Emmanuel Quarshie	6 May 1953 (aged 24)		(Ghana) Hasaacas
18	MF	Addae Kyenkyehene	14 November 1955 (aged 22)		(Ghana) Asante Kotoko
19	FW	Anas Seidu	1952		(Ghana) Hearts of Oak
20	FW	Willie Klutse	17 May 1955 (aged 22)		(Ghana) Dumas Boys
21	FW	Kuntu Blankson	1955		(Ghana) SS 1974
22	DF	Justice Moore			(Ghana) Eleven Wise

=== Nigeria ===
Coach: (Socialist Federal Republic of Yugoslavia) Tihomir Jelisavčić

No.	Pos.	Player	Date of birth (age)	Caps	Club
1	GK	Emmanuel Okala	17 May 1947 (aged 30)		(Nigeria) Enugu Rangers
4	MF	Muda Lawal	8 June 1954 (aged 23)		(Nigeria) Shooting Stars
5	DF	Christian Chukwu	4 January 1951 (aged 27)		(Nigeria) Enugu Rangers
6	DF	Godwin Odiye	17 April 1956 (aged 21)		Nigeria National Bank of Lagos
7	FW	Segun Odegbami	27 August 1952 (aged 25)		(Nigeria) Shooting Stars
8	MF	Aloysius Atuegbu	29 April 1953 (aged 24)		(Nigeria) Enugu Rangers
9	FW	Martins Eyo	4 January 1956 (aged 22)		(Nigeria) Julius Berger of Lagos
10	FW	Godwin Iwelumo	23 December 1954 (aged 23)		(Nigeria) ACB Lagos
11	FW	Adokiye Amiesimaka	23 November 1956 (aged 21)		(Nigeria) Enugu Rangers
	DF	Ahmed Annas			(Nigeria) Racca Rovers
	DF	Patrick Ekeji	11 March 1951 (aged 26)		(Nigeria) Enugu Rangers
	MF	Felix Owolabi	24 November 1954 (aged 23)		(Nigeria) Shooting Stars
	FW	Baba Otu Mohammed			(Nigeria) Racca Rovers
	DF	Nnamdi Anyafo			(Nigeria) Enugu Rangers
	MF	Segun Adeleke			(Nigeria) NEPA Lagos
	DF	Kadiri Ikhana	31 December 1951 (aged 26)		(Nigeria) Bendel Insurance
	DF	Ignatius Ilechukwu			(Nigeria) Enugu Rangers
	FW	Godwin Efejukwu			(Nigeria) Lagos Police FC
	FW	Christopher Ogu			(Nigeria) Bendel Insurance
	MF	Jide Dina	1952		(Nigeria) Mighty Jets
	DF	Tunde Bamidele	13 May 1953 (aged 24)		(Nigeria) Taraba United of Yola
	MF	Rufus Ejele			(Nigeria) Bendel Insurance
	FW	Eugene Ohuabuwa			(Nigeria) Spartans

=== Upper Volta ===
Coach: (West Germany) Otto Pfister

No.	Pos.	Player	Date of birth (age)	Caps	Goals	Club
	GK	Sidiki Diarra	6 January 1952 (aged 26)			(Burkinabé Football Federation) Silures Bobo-Dioulasso
	DF	Modeste Dah	13 May 1953 (aged 24)			(Burkinabé Football Federation) Etoile Filante
	DF	Dominique Sanou	5 March 1951 (aged 27)			(Burkinabé Football Federation) US FRAN
	DF	Célestin Nikiema				(Burkinabé Football Federation) Etoile Filante
	DF	Laurent Banady				(Burkinabé Football Federation) US FRAN
	DF	Alphonse Bado				(Burkinabé Football Federation) ASFB
	FW	Téwindé Compaoré				(Burkinabé Football Federation) Jeanne d'Arc
	MF	Hubert Hien				(Burkinabé Football Federation) Jeanne d'Arc
	MF	Mamadou Koita				(Burkinabé Football Federation) Etoile Filante
	MF	Antoine Ouédraogo				(Burkinabé Football Federation) Etoile Filante
	FW	Tasséré Ouédraogo				(Burkinabé Football Federation) USFA
	FW	Ibrahim Cissé				(Burkinabé Football Federation) Etoile Filante
	FW	Abdoulaye Compaoré				(Burkinabé Football Federation) ASFB
	FW	Nignan Corneille				

=== Zambia ===
Coach: (England) Brian Tiler

No.	Pos.	Player	Date of birth (age)	Caps	Goals	Club
	GK	Vincent Chileshe	17 February 1957 (aged 21)			(Football Association of Zambia) Roan United
	DF	Kaiser Kalambo	6 June 1953 (aged 24)			(Football Association of Zambia) Ndola United
	DF	Robert Lutoba				(Football Association of Zambia) Green Buffaloes
	DF	Ackim Musenge (c)	7 October 1949 (aged 28)			(Football Association of Zambia) Mufulira Wanderers
	DF	Bernard Mutale				(Football Association of Zambia) Red Arrows
	DF	Bizwell Phiri				(Football Association of Zambia)
	DF	Fabiano Mwaba				(Football Association of Zambia) Kabwe Warriors
	FW	Alex Chola	6 June 1956 (aged 21)			(Football Association of Zambia) Mufulira Blackpool
	MF	Evans Katebe	17 March 1960 (aged 17)			(Football Association of Zambia) Mufulira Wanderers
	MF	Patrick Phiri	3 May 1956 (aged 21)			(Football Association of Zambia) Red Arrows
	MF	Willie Phiri	3 June 1953 (aged 24)			(Football Association of Zambia) Nchanga Rangers
	MF	Moses Simwala	16 July 1949 (aged 28)			(Football Association of Zambia) Rokana United
	DF	Jani Simulambo	9 November 1953 (aged 24)			(Football Association of Zambia) Green Buffaloes
	FW	Godfrey Chitalu	22 October 1947 (aged 30)			(Football Association of Zambia) Kabwe Warriors
	FW	Obby Kapita	1951			(Football Association of Zambia) Green Buffaloes
	FW	Brighton Sinyangwe				(Football Association of Zambia)

== Group B ==
=== Congo ===
Coach: (Republic of the Congo) Maurice Ondzola

No.	Pos.	Player	Date of birth (age)	Caps	Goals	Club
	GK	Jean-Jacques Maboundou	1950			(Congolese Football Federation) Diables Noirs
	GK	Maxime Matsima	18 November 1940 (aged 37)			(Congolese Football Federation) Diables Noirs
	GK	Fidèle Nkoumbou				(Congolese Football Federation)
	DF	Martial Lassy				(Congolese Football Federation) CARA Brazzaville
	DF	Gaston N'Ganga-Muivi				(Congolese Football Federation) CARA Brazzaville
	DF	Pierre Dimonékéné				(Congolese Football Federation)
	DF	Joseph Mounoundzi (Captain)				(Congolese Football Federation) Diables Noirs
	MF	Jean-Luc Tsélantsiéné				(Congolese Football Federation) Télésport Brazzaville
	MF	Christian Mbama	3 October 1954 (aged 23)			(Congolese Football Federation)
	MF	Jonas Bahamboula	2 February 1949 (aged 29)			(Congolese Football Federation) Diables Noirs
	MF	Jean-Jacques N'Domba	12 January 1960 (aged 18)			(Congolese Football Federation) Étoile du Congo
	FW	Paul Moukila	6 June 1950 (aged 27)			(Congolese Football Federation) CARA Brazzaville
	FW	François M'Pelé	13 July 1947 (aged 30)			(French Football Federation) Paris Saint-Germain
	FW	Sébastien Lakou				(Congolese Football Federation) Vita Club Mokanda
	FW	Daniel Ebomoua	1950 (aged 27 or 28)			(Congolese Football Federation)
	FW	Jacques Mamounoubala	2 April 1953 (aged 24)			(Congolese Football Federation) CARA Brazzaville
	DF	Henri Endzanga				(Congolese Football Federation)
	FW	Albert Poaty-Bouanga				(Congolese Football Federation)

=== Morocco ===
Coach: (Romania) Gheorghe Mărdărescu

No.	Pos.	Player	Date of birth (age)	Caps	Goals	Club
	GK	Mohammed Hazzaz	November 30, 1944 (aged 33)			(Royal Moroccan Football Federation) MAS Fez
	DF	Jawad El Andaloussi	July 15, 1955 (aged 22)			(Royal Moroccan Football Federation) Wydad Casablanca
	DF	Abdellah Semmat	November 30, 1951 (aged 26)			(Royal Moroccan Football Federation) US Sidi Kacem
	DF	Larbi Aherdane	June 6, 1954 (aged 23)			(Royal Moroccan Football Federation) Wydad Casablanca
	DF	Mustapha Yaghcha	November 7, 1952 (aged 25)			(Swiss Football Association) CS Chênois
	MF	Abdelmajid Dolmy	April 19, 1953 (aged 24)			(Royal Moroccan Football Federation) Raja Casablanca
	MF	Chérif Fetoui	January 1, 1945 (aged 33)			(Royal Moroccan Football Federation) Difaâ Hassani El Jadidi
	MF	Ahmed Makrouh	September 17, 1953 (aged 24)			(Royal Moroccan Football Federation) Difaâ Hassani El Jadidi
	MF	Abdallah Tazi	November 30, 1944 (aged 33)			(Royal Moroccan Football Federation) MAS Fez
	FW	Hassan "Acila" Amcharrat	1948			(Royal Moroccan Football Federation) Raja Casablanca
	FW	Houcine Anafal	September 15, 1952 (aged 25)			(Royal Moroccan Football Federation) Kenitra AC
	FW	Mohamed Boussati	1955			(Royal Moroccan Football Federation) Kenitra AC
	FW	Ahmed Faras	December 7, 1946 (aged 31)			(Royal Moroccan Football Federation) SCC Mohammédia
	FW	Abdelmajid Shaita	January 19, 1954 (aged 24)			(Royal Moroccan Football Federation) Wydad Casablanca

=== Tunisia ===
Coach: Abdelmajid Chetali

No.	Pos.	Player	Date of birth (age)	Caps	Goals	Club
21	GK	Lamine Ben Aziza	November 10, 1951 (aged 26)			(Tunisian Football Federation) Étoile Sportive du Sahel
1	GK	Sadok "Attouga" Sassi	November 15, 1945 (aged 32)			(Tunisian Football Federation) Club Africain
22	GK	Mokhtar Naili	November 3, 1953 (aged 24)			(Tunisian Football Federation) Club Africain
8	DF	Kamel Chebli	March 9, 1954 (aged 23)			(Tunisian Football Federation) Club Africain
2	DF	Mokhtar Dhouieb	March 23, 1952 (aged 25)			(Tunisian Football Federation) CS Sfaxien
18	DF	Ridha El Louze	April 27, 1953 (aged 24)			(Tunisian Football Federation) Sfax Railways Sports
3	DF	Ali Kaabi	November 15, 1953 (aged 24)			(Tunisian Football Federation) COT Tunis
14	DF	Mohsen "Jendoubi" Labidi	January 15, 1954 (aged 24)			(Tunisian Football Federation) Stade Tunisien
5	DF	Habib Majeri	December 14, 1951 (aged 26)			(Tunisian Football Federation) Club Africain
10	MF	Tarak Dhiab	July 15, 1954 (aged 23)			(Tunisian Football Federation) Espérance Sportive de Tunis
6	MF	Néjib Ghommidh	March 12, 1953 (aged 24)			(Tunisian Football Federation) Club Africain
12	MF	Khemais Labidi	August 30, 1950 (aged 27)			(Tunisian Football Federation) JS Kairouan
9	FW	Mohamed Akid	July 5, 1949 (aged 28)			(Tunisian Football Federation) CS Sfaxien
21	FW	Abderraouf Ben Aziza	September 23, 1953 (aged 24)			(Tunisian Football Federation) Étoile Sportive du Sahel
16	FW	Ohman Chehaibi	December 23, 1954 (aged 23)			(Tunisian Football Federation) JS Kairouan
7	FW	Témime Lahzami	January 1, 1949 (aged 29)			(Tunisian Football Federation) Espérance Sportive de Tunis
13	FW	Néjib Limam	June 12, 1953 (aged 24)			(Tunisian Football Federation) Stade Tunisien
4	DF	Khaled Gasmi	April 8, 1953 (aged 24)			(Tunisian Football Federation) Bizertin
20	DF	Amor Jebali	December 24, 1953 (aged 24)			(Tunisian Football Federation) La Marsa

=== Uganda ===
Coach: Peter Okee

No.	Pos.	Player	Date of birth (age)	Caps	Goals	Club
	GK	Paul Ssali	1955			(Federation of Uganda Football Associations) Simba FC
	GK	Jamil Kasirye	1954			(Federation of Uganda Football Associations) KCC
	GK	Hussein Matovu				(Federation of Uganda Football Associations) KCC
	DF	Mike Diku				(Federation of Uganda Football Associations)
	DF	Jimmy Kirunda (c)	1950			(Federation of Uganda Football Associations) KCC
	DF	Meddie Lubega				(Federation of Uganda Football Associations) Simba FC
	DF	Tom Lwanga				(Federation of Uganda Football Associations) KCC
	DF	Rashid Mudin				(Federation of Uganda Football Associations) KCC
	MF	Jimmy Muguwa	1954			(Federation of Uganda Football Associations) Uganda Commercial Bank FC
	DF	Ashe Mukasa	1 April 1952 (aged 25)			(Federation of Uganda Football Associations) KCC
	DF	Sam Musenze				(Federation of Uganda Football Associations) KCC
	MF	Timothy Ayieko	1954			(Federation of Uganda Football Associations) KCC
	MF	Mike Kiganda				(Federation of Uganda Football Associations)
	MF	Godfrey Kisitu	1951			(Federation of Uganda Football Associations) Simba FC
	FW	Barnabas Mwesiga	24 December 1947 (aged 30)			(Federation of Uganda Football Associations) Nsambya FC
	MF	Ahmed Abdulla Nasur	1952			(Federation of Uganda Football Associations) Maroons
	MF	Moses Nsereko	1952			(Federation of Uganda Football Associations) KCC
	MF	Edward Semwanga				(Federation of Uganda Football Associations)
	FW	Fred Isabirye				(Federation of Uganda Football Associations) Simba FC
	FW	Phillip Omondi	1957			(Federation of Uganda Football Associations) KCC
	FW	Polly Ouma	21 January 1942 (aged 36)			(Federation of Uganda Football Associations) Simba FC
	FW	Moses Sentamu				(Federation of Uganda Football Associations) KCC
