= Miracle of El-Wak =

- Event: 1977 African Cup of Champions Clubs semi-final second leg
Mufulira Wanderers	Hearts of Oak
(Zambia)	(Ghana)
0	3
- Tied 5–5 on aggregate, Hearts of Oak won on away goals rule
- Date: 6 November 1977
- Venue: El Wak Stadium, Accra

The Miracle of El-Wak is the nickname given to the second leg of the 1977 African Cup of Champions Clubs semi-finals between Ghanaian club Hearts of Oak and Zambian club Mufulira Wanderers. Following a 5–2 defeat in the first leg in Zambia, Hearts of Oak won the second leg in Accra 3–0 after three second half goals, to secure qualification for the club's first ever African Cup of Champions Clubs final.

This result is considered one of the greatest comebacks in the history of Ghanaian football.

== Background ==
Hearts of Oak qualified for the African Cup of Champions Clubs semi-finals, having beaten Liberian side Saint Joseph Warriors in the first round, followed by Senegalese side ASC Diaraf in the second round, and Egyptian club Al Ahly in the quarter-finals, where they won 3–1 on aggregate. This was the second time that Hearts had reached the African Cup of Champions Clubs semi-finals, with their first being in 1972, where they lost to Ugandan club Simba FC.

The first leg of the tie was held in Zambia, in front of 80,000 spectators. Additionally, Hearts were missing star forward Mohammed Polo for the match. Despite this, they took an early lead with a goal by Robert Hammond in the fifth minute. However, Mufulira Wanderers captain Ackim Musenge scored a penalty in the 20th minute, before both Thomas Bwalya and Willie Mukwasa scored in the span of two minutes near the end of the half. Six minutes into the second half, Hearts captain Mama Acquah made it 3–2, but goals from Bwalya and Mukwasa again saw Hearts lose 5–2.

During this period, Hearts of Oak was led by an attack known as the "Fearsome Five", consisting of Polo, Hammond, Acquah, Peter Lamptey, and Anas Seidu.

== Match ==
The match was played on 6 November 1977, two weeks after the first leg in Zambia. Additionally, it occurred only five days before Hearts of Oak's 66th anniversary. At the time, the Accra Sports Stadium had been shut down, as it was undergoing renovations to host the 1978 African Cup of Nations, with the El-Wak Stadium being seen as a worthy substitute. This match also saw the return of Mohammed Polo, who later revealed that he was only half-fit during the match.

The first half of the match was dull, with the pressure of needing at least three unanswered goals making it difficult for the Hearts players to get their acts together. In the 59th minute, Polo crossed the ball, which was scored by Anas Seidu to put Hearts 1–0 up. They made it 2–0 in the 79th minute, after Polo dribbled through the Mufulira Wanderers' defense before passing it to Peter Lamptey, who flicked it past the goalkeeper. In the 88th minute, Emmanuel Ofei Ansah thumped the ball upfront, with Polo dropping into the defense to get it. He passed it to club captain Mama Acquah, who paced up the right flank before cutting it into Seidu, who scored his second goal of the match to make it 3–0.

In the end, Hearts of Oak advanced to the final on away goals rule, with the matchup being tied 5–5 on aggregate.

=== Details ===
6 November 1977

Mufulira Wanderers (Zambia)	0–3	(Ghana) Hearts of Oak
	Report	Seidu 59', 88'; Lamptey 79'

El-Wak Stadium, Accra

GK	(Zambia)
	(Zambia)
	(Zambia)
	(Zambia)
	(Zambia)
	(Zambia)
	(Zambia)
	(Zambia)
	(Zambia)
	(Zambia)
	(Zambia)
Manager:
(Zambia) Dickson Makwaza

GK		(Ghana) Sam Suppey
DF		(Ghana) Evans Aryee Quaye
DF		(Ghana) Emmanuel Ofei Ansah
DF		(Ghana) Sarpei Nunoo
MF	6	(Ghana) Adolf Armah
MF		(Ghana) Anthony Micah
FW	7	(Ghana) Robert Hammond
FW	8	(Ghana) Mama Acquah (c)
FW	9	(Ghana) Peter Lamptey
FW	10	(Ghana) Anas Seidu
FW	11	(Ghana) Mohammed Polo
Manager:
(Ghana)

== Aftermath ==
Following their victory, Hearts of Oak qualified for their first African Cup of Champions Clubs final, becoming the second club from Ghana to ever do so, after Asante Kotoko in 1970. In the final, Hearts of Oak lost 4–2 on aggregate to Guinean side Hafia FC, losing the first leg 1–0 at home, before losing again 3–2 in Conakry, to miss out on the club's first continental trophy. They reached the final again two years later, losing to Cameroonian side Union Douala after a penalty shootout, before eventually winning their first continental trophy in 2000, beating Tunisian side ES Tunis 5–2 on aggregate to win the CAF Champions League.

On 7 November 2025, the Ghanaian Times published an article about the El-Wak Stadium's present-day conditions, describing it as "a painful reminder of Ghana’s chronic neglect of public infrastructure". Five days later, six people were killed following a crowd crush at a Ghana Armed Forces recruitment drive held at the stadium.
