= 1992 CAF Cup final =

1992 Abiola Cup final
- Event: 1992 CAF Cup
Nakivubo Villa	Shooting Stars
(Uganda)	(Nigeria)
0	3

First leg
Nakivubo Villa	Shooting Stars
0	0
- Date: 14 November 1992
- Venue: Nakivubo Stadium, Kampala
- Referee: Hounake Kouassi

Second leg
Shooting Stars	Nakivubo Villa
3	0
- Date: 28 November 1992
- Venue: Liberty Stadium, Ibadan
- Referee: Abdelali Naciri
- Attendance: ≈ 50.000

The 1992 CAF Cup final was the inaugural final of the CAF Cup, a two-legged tie to determine the first winner of the Moshood Abiola trophy. The final pitted Shooting Stars of Ibadan from Nigeria against Nakivubo Villa from Uganda. The first leg took place in Kampala, Uganda on 14 November at Nakivubo Stadium, while the second leg was held in Ibadan, Nigeria on 28 November at Liberty Stadium.

Shooting Stars emerged victorious with an aggregate score of 3–0, thereby becoming the first team to win the CAF Cup and achieving their second continental trophy after conquering the 1976 African Cup Winners' Cup.

== Venues ==
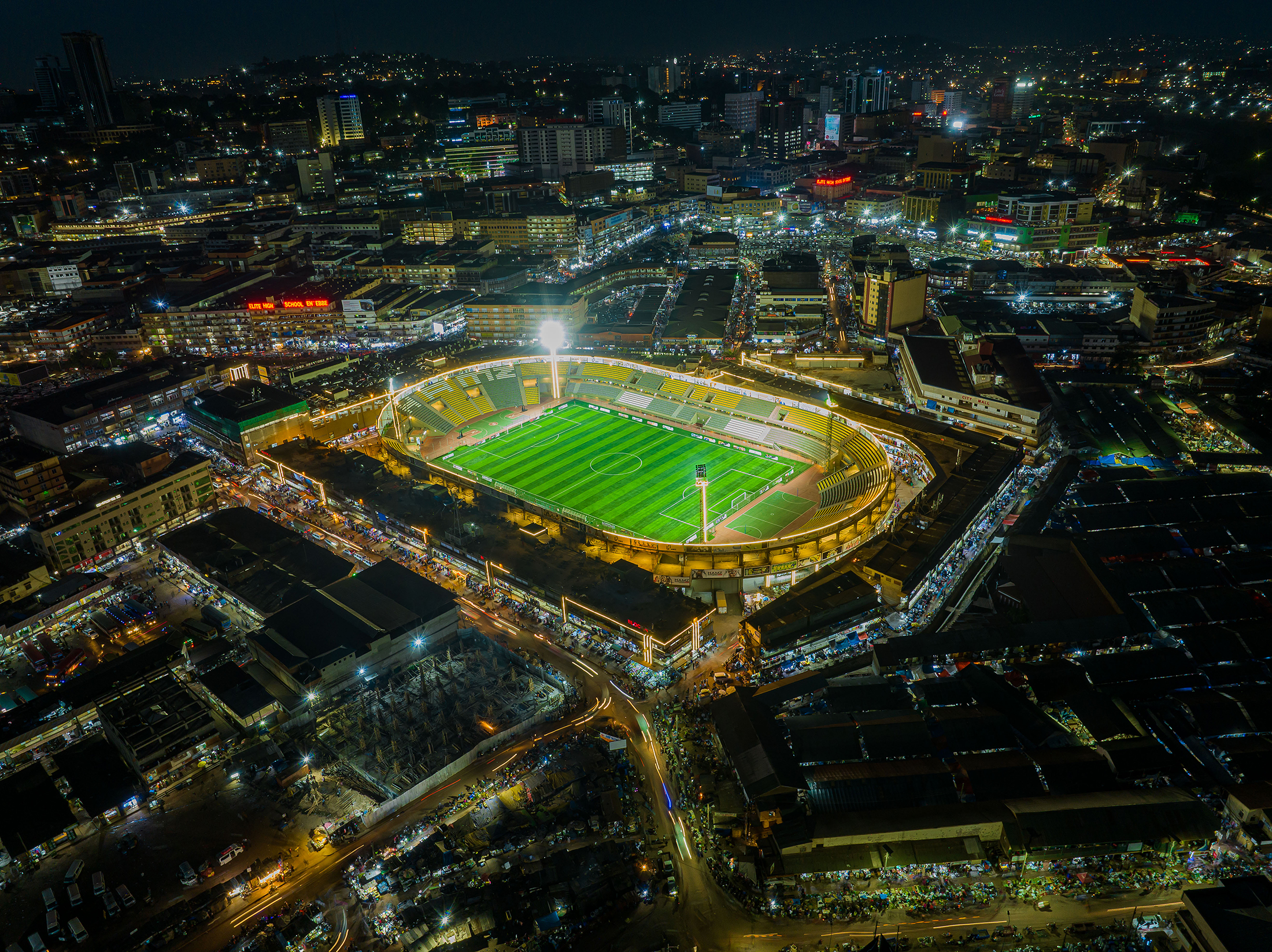
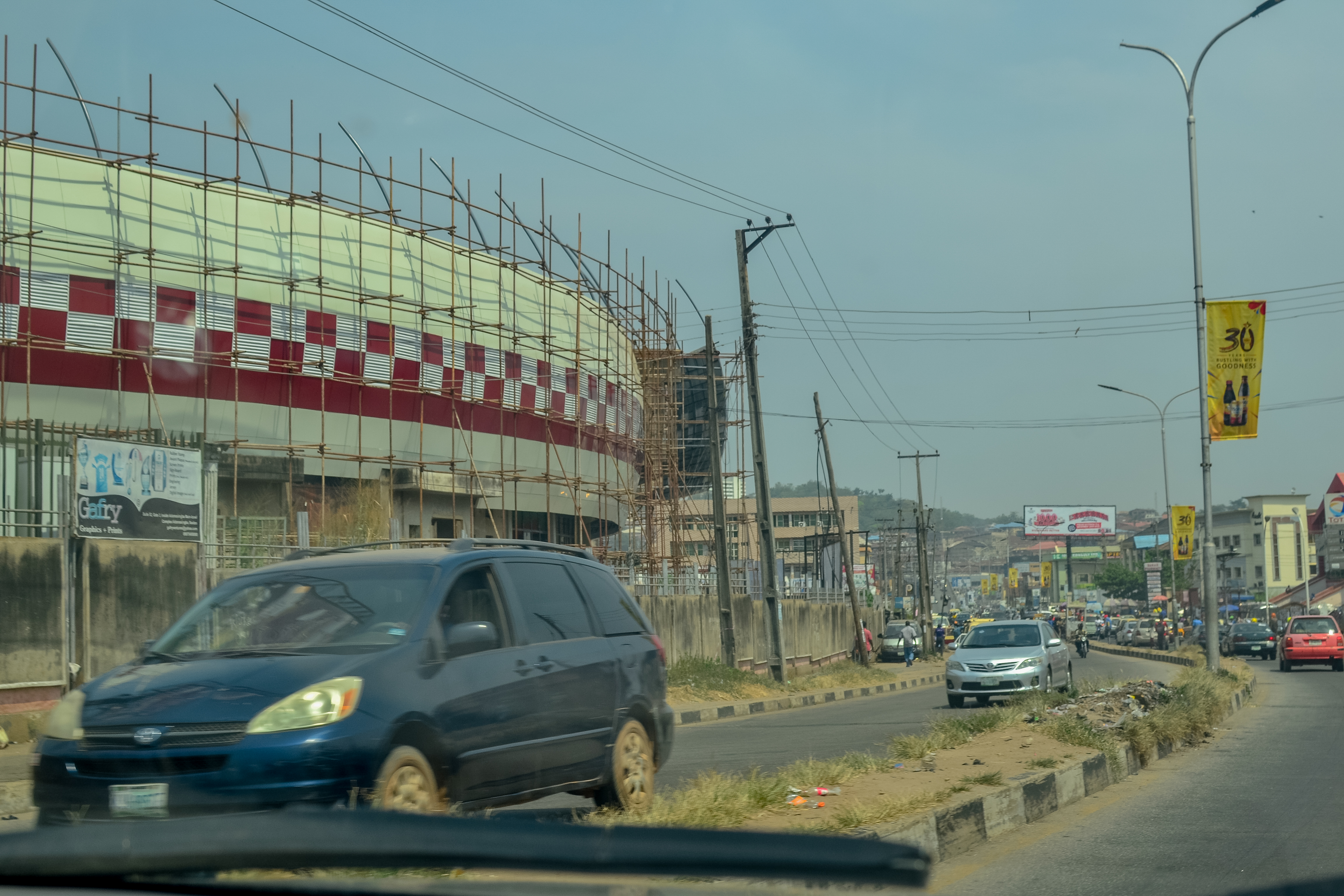
Nakivubo Stadium (left) and Liberty Stadium, venues for the series

== Route to the final ==
Shooting Stars				Round	Nakivubo Villa			
Opponent	Agg.	1st leg	2nd leg		Opponent	Agg.	1st leg	2nd leg
Bye				First round	(Eswatini) Moneni Pirates	5–2	3–1 (H)	2–1 (A)
(Burkina Faso) USC Bobo Dioulasso	4–1	1–1 (A)	3–1 (H)	Second round	(Kenya) Kisumu Postal	2–0	1–0 (H)	1–0 (A)
(Zaire) Mbongo Sport	1–1 (3–2 p)	1–0 (H)	0–1 (A)	Quarter-finals	(Gabon) ASMO Libreville	3–2	3–1 (H)	0–1 (A)
(Tunisia) CA Bizertin	3–2	0–2 (A)	3–0 (H)	Semi-finals	(Mozambique) Ferroviário de Maputo	2–2 (4–3 p)	1–1 (H)	1–1 (A)

== Match details ==
=== First leg ===
1992 CAF Cup Final
14 November 1992
First leg

Nakivubo Villa (Note: Some of the full names of the Nakibuvo Villa players were taken from a Facebook article about the career of Robert Mukiibi.) (Uganda)	0–0	(Nigeria) Shooting Stars (Note: Some of the full names of the Shooting Stars players were taken from articles that described the 1992 CAF Cup campaign or the legacy that some players left behind for the club.)
	Report

Nakivubo Stadium, Kampala
Referee: Hounake Kouassi (Togo)

GK	(Uganda) Michael Mukasa
DF	(Uganda) Paul Hasule
DF	(Uganda) Adam Semugabi
DF	(Uganda) Robert Mukiibi
DF	(Uganda) William Nkemba
MF	(Uganda) Paul Nkata
MF	(Uganda) Iddi Batambuze
MF	(Uganda) Zaidi Tebesigwa	(substituted off) 45'
MF	(Uganda) Charles Omego	(substituted off) 70'
FW	(Uganda) Paul Mukatabala
FW	(Uganda) Sula Kato
Substitutes:
MF	(Uganda) Robert Semakula	(substituted on) 45'
MF	(Uganda) Nwanlazi	(substituted on) 70'
Manager:
(Uganda) Timothy Ayeiko

GK	(Nigeria) Ademola Bankole
DF	(Nigeria) Friday Christopher (c)
DF	(Nigeria) Bright Omokaro
DF	(Nigeria) Ajibade Babalade
DF	(Nigeria) Ogbein Fawole
MF	(Nigeria) Mojeed Azeez
MF	(Nigeria) Tunji Adeyemi	(substituted off) 59'
MF	(Nigeria) Taofeek Malik
MF	(Nigeria) Kenneth Ugorji	(substituted off) 77'
FW	(Nigeria) Felix Owolabi
FW	(Nigeria) Sola Akinwale
Substitutes:
MF	(Nigeria) Gordon Osusu	(substituted on) 59'
MF	(Benin) Expédit Dossou-Gbété	(substituted on) 77'
Manager:
(Nigeria) Niyi Akande

=== Second leg ===
28 November 1992
Second leg

Shooting Stars (Nigeria)	3–0	(Uganda) Nakivubo Villa
Azeez 39' (pen.); Adeyemi 68'; Uti 80'	Report

Liberty Stadium, Ibadan
Attendance: 50.000
Referee: Abdelali Naciri (Morocco)

GK	(Nigeria) Ademola Bankole
DF	(Nigeria) Friday Christopher (c)
DF	(Nigeria) Bright Omokaro
DF	(Nigeria) Ajibade Babalade
DF	(Nigeria) Ogbein Fawole
MF	(Nigeria) Mojeed Azeez
MF	(Nigeria) Sola Akinwale	(substituted off) 58'
MF	(Nigeria) Taofeek Malik
MF	(Nigeria) Andrew Uti
FW	(Nigeria) Tunji Adeyemi	(substituted off) 70'
FW	(Nigeria) Felix Owolabi
Substitutes:
MF	(Nigeria) Kenneth Ugorji	(substituted on) 58'
FW	(Nigeria) Gordon Osusu	(substituted on) 70'
Manager:
(Nigeria) Niyi Akande

GK	(Uganda) Michael Mukasa
DF	(Uganda) Paul Hasule
DF	(Uganda) Adam Semugabi
DF	(Uganda) Robert Mukiibi
DF	(Uganda) William Nkemba
MF	(Uganda) Paul Nkata
MF	(Uganda) Iddi Batambuze
MF	(Uganda) Charles Omego
MF	(Uganda) Sula Kato
FW	(Uganda) Paul Mukatabala
FW	(Uganda) Zaidi Tebesigwa
Manager:
(Uganda) Timothy Ayeiko

== See also ==
- CAF Cup
- 1992 CAF Cup
