= 1978 Afro-Asian Cup of Nations =

First edition of the Afro-Asian Cup of Nations

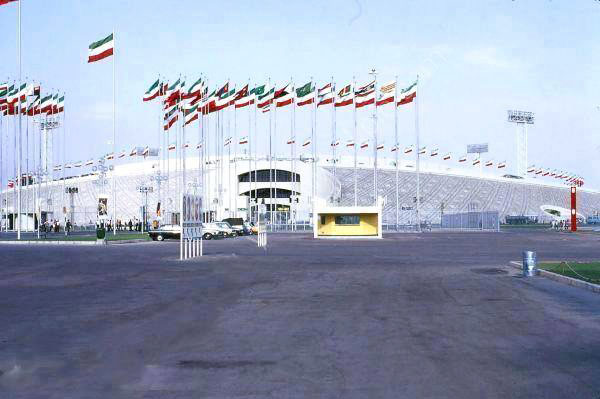
- Aryamehr, now Azadi Stadium hosted the first leg
Iran	Ghana
- Cancelled

First leg
Iran	Ghana
3	0
- Date: 19 May 1978
- Venue: Aryamehr Stadium, Tehran
- Referee: Abdulwahab Al Bannai (Kuwait)
- Attendance: 8,000

Second leg
Ghana	Iran
- Cancelled
- Date: 1978
- Venue: Accra Sports Stadium, Accra

The 1978 Afro-Asian Cup of Nations was the first edition of the Afro-Asian Cup of Nations, it was contested by Ghana, winners of the 1978 African Cup of Nations, and Iran, winners of the 1976 AFC Asian Cup. The tournament planned to be played into two legs. The first leg was played in Tehran and Iran beat Ghana 3–0. However the second leg which was to be played in Accra was cancelled due to the Iranian Revolution.

== Qualified teams ==
Country	Qualified as	Previous appearance in tournament
Ghana	1978 African Cup of Nations champions	Debut
Iran	1976 Asian Cup champions	Debut

== Match details ==
=== First leg ===
19 May 1978
--:-- UTC+3:30

Iran	3–0	Ghana
Khani 20'; Khalilian 70'; Mazloumi 75'	Report

Aryamehr Stadium, Tehran
Attendance: 8,000
Referee: Abdulwahab Al Bannai (Kuwait)

Iran:
GK	–	Karim Boostani
DF	–	Mehdi Dinvarzadeh
DF	–	Kazem Seyed Alikhani	(substituted off) 59'
DF	–	Mohammad Dadkan
MF	–	Ahmad Sanjari
MF	–	Kamal Khalilian
MF	–	Hossein Hosseini
MF	–	Majeed Salimpour	(substituted off) 59'
MF	–	Ali Akbar Yousefi
FW	–	Moslem Khani	(substituted off) 85'
FW	–	Parviz Mazloumi
Substitutes:
DF	–	Habib Khabiri
MF	–	Mohammad Mayeli Kohan	(substituted on) 85'
MF	–	Mohammad Ahmadzadeh	(substituted on) 59'
MF	–	Alireza Heydari	(substituted on) 59'
Manager:
Mahmoud Yavari

Ghana:
GK	–	Joe Carr
DF	–	Isaac Acquaye
DF	–	James Dadzie
DF	–	Awuley Quaye
DF	–	Haruna Yusif	(substituted off) 74'
MF	–	Adolf Armah
MF	–	John Nketia Yawson
MF	–	Karim Abdul Razak
MF	–
FW	–	Opoku Afriyie
FW	–	...
Substitutes:
GK	–	...
DF	–	Joseph Ofei Ansah	(substituted on) 74'
MF	–	...
FW	–	...
Manager:
(West Germany) Rudi Gutendorf

=== Second leg ===
Ghana	Cancelled	Iran

Accra Sports Stadium, Accra

The trophy was not awarded, because the second leg was cancelled.
