= Blankson =

Blankson is a surname and a given name. Notable people with the name include:

Given name:

- Blankson Anoff (born 2001), Ghanaian footballer

Surname:

- Alex Blankson (born 1980), Ghanaian politician and MP
- Ekow Blankson (1972–2022), Ghanaian actor, Commercial Manager of GhanaWeb
- George Kuntu Blankson (born 1957), Ghanaian politician
- Isaiah Blankson (1944–2021), Ghanaian scientist, academic and aerospace engineer
- Joel N. Blankson, professor at the Johns Hopkins School of Medicine
- Joseph Blankson (1979–2018), Nigerian contractor who died saving 13 victims of a boat accident
- Kuntu Blankson (1955–2018), Ghanaian actor
- Stanley Nii Adjiri Blankson, Ghanaian politician, mayor of Accra
