= Kasirye =

Kasirye is a Ugandan surname. Notable people with the surname include:

- Jamil Kasirye (born 1954), Ugandan football goalkeeper
- Nalwoga Cerinah Kasirye, Ugandan businesswoman and entrepreneur
- Ruth Kasirye (born 1982), Norwegian weightlifter

== See also ==
- Kasirye Byaruhanga, a Ugandan law firm
