= 1977 African Cup of Champions Clubs =

Tournament details
- Dates: April - 18 December 1977
- Teams: 29 (from 1 confederation)

Final positions
- Champions: (Guinea) Hafia FC (3rd title)
- Runners-up: (Ghana) Hearts of Oak

Tournament statistics
- Matches played: 52
- Goals scored: 156 (3 per match)
- Top scorer: (Egypt) Mahmoud El Khatib (4 goals)

The African Cup of Champions Clubs 1977 was the 13th edition of the annual international club football competition held in the CAF region (Africa), the African Cup of Champions Clubs. It determined that year's club champion of association football in Africa.

The tournament was played by 29 teams and used a knock-out format with ties played home and away. Hafia FC from Guinea won that final, and became CAF club champion for the third time.

== First round ==
Team 1	Agg.	Team 2	1st leg	2nd leg
ASC Diaraf (Senegal)	5–0	(Mauritania) ASC Garde Nationale	3–0	2–0
SC Gagnoa (Ivory Coast)	w/o^{1}	(Central African Republic) AS Tempête Mocaf	—	—
Gor Mahia (Kenya)	3–3 (5–3 p)	(Malawi) Yamaha Wanderers	1–2	2–1
Horseed FC (Somalia)	1–4	(Egypt) Al Ahly	1–1	0–3
Kampala City Council FC (Uganda)	4–0	(Ethiopia) Mechal Army	1–0	3–0
Mufulira Wanderers (Zambia)	3–3	(Lesotho) Maseru United	1–1	2–2
Olympic Niamey (Niger)	4–6	(Libya) Al-Madina	2–4	2–2
Saint Joseph Warriors FC (Liberia)	2–5	(Ghana) Hearts of Oak	1–3	1–2
Simba SC (Tanzania)	w/o^{1}	(Eswatini) Mbabane Highlanders	—	—
TP Mazembe (Zaire)	1–4	(Togo) Lomé I	1–1	0–3
UD Internacional (Guinea-Bissau)	0–6	(Mali) Djoliba AC	0–1	0–5
Union Douala (Cameroon)	3–0	(Republic of Upper Volta) Silures Bobo-Dioulasso	2–0	1–0
Vantour Club Mangoungou (Gabon)	4–8	(Republic of the Congo) Diables Noirs	2–4	2–4

^{1} Mbabane Highlanders and AS Tempête Mocaf withdrew.

== Second round ==
Team 1	Agg.	Team 2	1st leg	2nd leg
Al Ahly (Egypt)	7–3	(Libya) Al-Madina	7–2	0–1
Diables Noirs (Republic of the Congo)	1–2	(Guinea) Hafia FC	0–1	1–1
ASC Diaraf (Senegal)	2–3	(Ghana) Hearts of Oak	1–1	1–2
SC Gagnoa (Ivory Coast)	2–4	(Mali) Djoliba AC	1–3	1–1
Gor Mahia (Kenya)	4–5	(Zambia) Mufulira Wanderers	2–1	2–4
Kampala City Council FC (Uganda)	3–4	(Algeria) MC Alger	1–1	2–3
Union Douala (Cameroon)	2–2 (3–4 p)	(Togo) Lomé I	1–1	1–1
Kwara Water Corporation FC (Nigeria)	1–0	(Tanzania) Simba SC	0–0	1–0

== Quarter-finals ==
Team 1	Agg.	Team 2	1st leg	2nd leg
Al Ahly (Egypt)	1–3	(Ghana) Hearts of Oak	1–0	0–3
Djoliba AC (Mali)	2–1^{1}	(Togo) Lomé I	2–0	0–1
MP Alger^{2} (Algeria)	2–3	(Zambia) Mufulira Wanderers	2–1	0–2
Kwara Water Corporation FC (Nigeria)	4–5	(Guinea) Hafia FC	4–2	0–3

^{1} Djoliba AC were disqualified as Mali were suspended by CAF after police and security forces assaulted officials during an African Cup of Nations qualifying match in Bamako against Ivory Coast on 19 June.
^{1} MC Alger changed its name to MP Alger as part of the sports national reform.

== Semi-finals ==
Team 1	Agg.	Team 2	1st leg	2nd leg
Lomé I (Togo)	2–3	(Guinea) Hafia FC	2–1	0–2
Mufulira Wanderers (Zambia)	5–5 (a)	(Ghana) Hearts of Oak	5–2	0–3

== Final ==
4 December 1977
--:-- UTC+0

Hearts of Oak (Ghana)	0–1	(Guinea) Hafia FC
		Touré 26'

Accra Sports Stadium, Accra
18 December 1977
--:-- UTC+0

Hafia FC (Guinea)	3–2	(Ghana) Hearts of Oak
Bangoura; B. Sylla; Camara		Anas Seidu; Hammond

Stade du 28 Septembre, Conakry
Attendance: 30,000

== Champion ==
African Cup of Champions Clubs
1977 Winners

Hafia FC
Third Title

== Top scorers ==
The top scorers from the 1977 African Cup of Champions Clubs are as follows:

Rank	Name	Team	Goals
1	(Egypt) Mahmoud El Khatib	(Egypt) Al Ahly	4
2	(Egypt) Taher El Shaikh	(Egypt) Al Ahly	3
2	(Ghana) Robert Hammond	(Ghana) Hearts of Oak	3
2	(Ghana) Peter Lamptey	(Ghana) Hearts of Oak	3
2	(Mali) Alaka Boura	(Mali) Djoliba	3
6	(Algeria) Abdeslam Bousri	(Algeria) MC Alger	2
6	(Egypt) Sherif Abdel Moneim	(Egypt) Al Ahly	2
6	(Egypt) Mokhtar Mokhtar	(Egypt) Al Ahly	2
6	(Ghana) Mohammed Polo	(Ghana) Hearts of Oak	2
6	(Ghana) Anas Seidu	(Ghana) Hearts of Oak	2
6	(Kenya) Allan Thigo	(Kenya) Gor Mahia	2
6	(Zambia) Thomas Bwalya	(Zambia) Mufulira Wanderers	2
6	(Zambia) Willie Mukwasa	(Zambia) Mufulira Wanderers	2
