= P. S. K. Paha =

Ghanaian footballer

Personal information
- Place of birth: Ghana
- Position: Defender

Senior career*
Years	Team	Apps	(Gls)
- Sekondi Eleven Wise
- Great Ambassadors

International career
1978–1979	Ghana		
Medal record
Representing Ghana
Men's football
Africa Cup of Nations
Winner	1978 Ghana
- * Club domestic league appearances and goals

P. S. K. Paha is a Ghanaian former professional footballer and manager. During his playing career Paha played as a defender specifically as a right-back for Sekondi Eleven Wise and Great Ambassadors. At the international level, he is known for being part of the squad that won the 1978 African Cup of Nations.

== Club career ==
Paha played for Sekondi Eleven Wise and Great Ambassadors FC.

== International career ==
Paha played for the Ghana national team. In 1976, he was a member of the Ghana Olympic squad that boycott and withdrew from the 1976 Summer Olympics the International Olympic Committee (IOC) refused to ban New Zealand, after the New Zealand national rugby union team had toured South Africa earlier in 1976 in defiance of the United Nations' calls for a sporting embargo of the country whilst they were in apartheid.

Paha served as the assistant captain and was key member of the squad that played at the 1978 African Cup of Nations helping Ghana to make history as the first country to win the competition three times and for keeps after scoring Uganda 2–0 in the finals. In 1980, he was the assistant captain along with Adolf Armah to Kuuku Dadzie the captain when the team withdrew from their training camp ahead of the 1980 AFCON. The trio being the leaders of the team, advocated on behalf of the entire team and sent letters entitled '' Grievances of the Black Stars'' to the GFA and National Sports Council communicating to them on the withdrawal. Their withdraw non fulfillment of the a promise made by the late Ignatius Kutu Acheampong's government to offer an estate house each to playing body of the 1978 AFCON winning squad.

== Coaching career ==
After Paha retired, he went into football coaching, becoming the head coach of Sekondi Hasaacas in 1985. He led Hasaacas to defeat both Asante Kotoko by 2–1 to win the 1985 Ghanaian FA Cup. He later led them to also win the Ghana Super Cup after defeating league champions Hearts of Oak in 1986. In 1997, Paha was part of the technical bench of Sekondi Hasaacas, alongside fellow Ghanaian internationals Kuuku Dadzie and Emmanuel Quarshie. From 2000 to 2002, he served as the head coach of the Ghana women's national football team. He led them to a third-place finish during the 2000 African Women's Championship. In July 2007, Paha was part of the 30 selected coaches who were taken through a re-classification course by CAF and the GFA for the award of a professional coaching license "C".

== Personal life ==
Paha is the older brother of fellow professional football Isaac Paha, who also played for the Black Stars helping them to also win the 1982 African Cup of Nations, the 4th title for Ghana.

== Honours ==
=== Player ===
Ghana

- African Cup of Nations: 1978

=== Manager ===
Sekondi Hasaacas

- Ghanaian FA Cup: 1985
- Ghana Super Cup: 1986

Ghana Women

- African Women's Championship third place: 2000

Individual

- National team Awards for role played in Ghana football.
