= El Wak Stadium =

Sports venue in Accra, Ghana

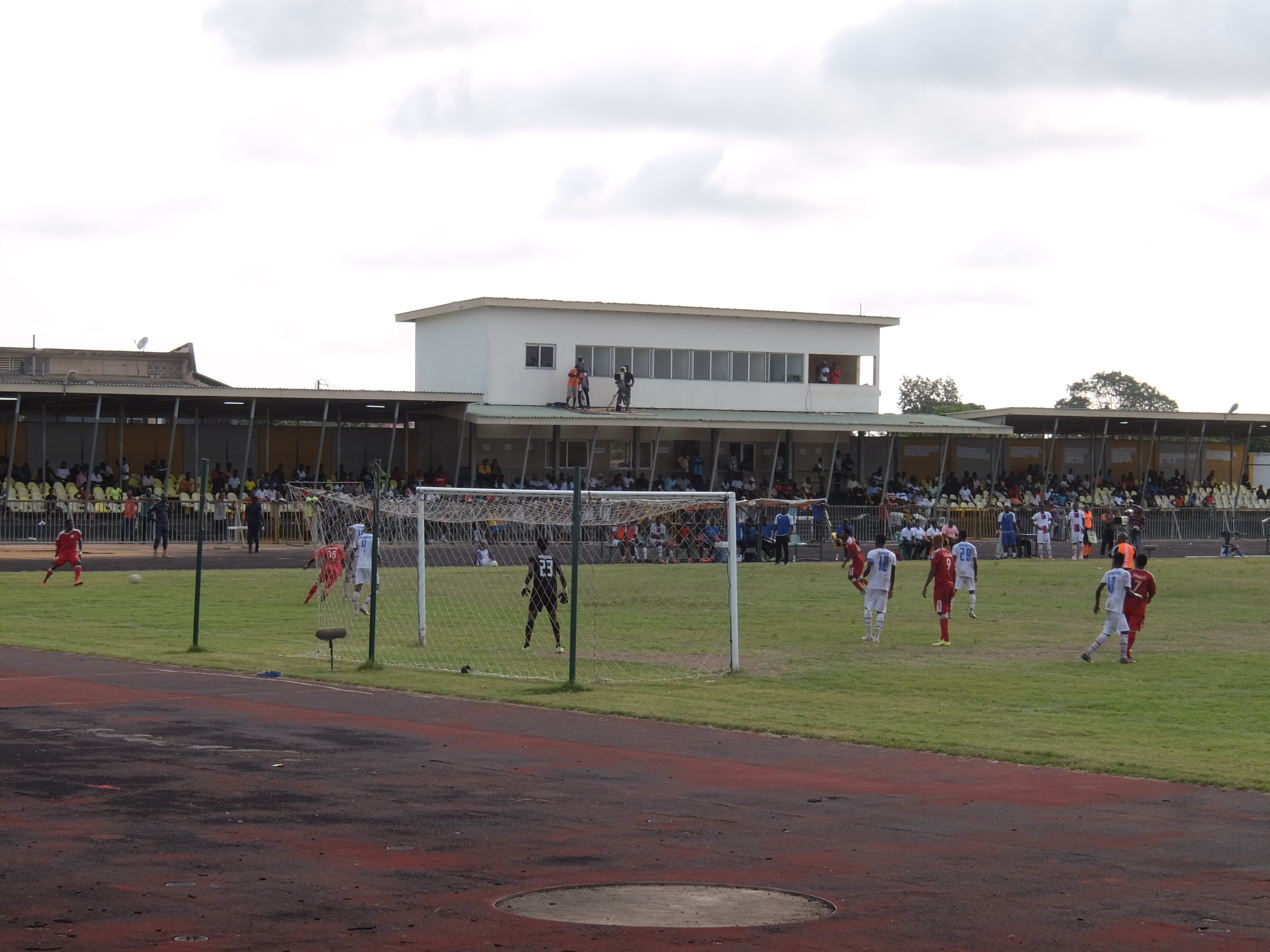
- Interactive map of El Wak Stadium
- Location: Accra, Ghana
- Coordinates: 5°35′11″N 0°10′22″W
- Capacity: 7,000
- Surface: Grass

Tenant
- Inter Allies

The El Wak Stadium is a multi-purpose stadium in Cantonments, a suburb of Accra. It is owned by the Ghana Armed Forces and has a seating capacity of 7,000. It was the home venue of Inter Allies, in the 2016/2017 Ghanaian Premier League season.

On 6 November 1977, the stadium hosted the 1977 African Cup of Champions Clubs semi-finals between Hearts of Oak and Mufulira Wanderers, which was later known as the Miracle of El-Wak, as the Accra Sports Stadium was undergoing renovations in order to host the 1978 African Cup of Nations.

On 12 November 2025, six people are killed in a crowd crush at a recruitment drive of the Ghana Armed Forces at the stadium.
