= Stuart C. Ray =

American physician

Stuart C. Ray is an American physician. He is Vice Chair of Medicine for Data Integrity and Analytics, Associate Director of the Infectious Diseases Fellowship Training Program at the Johns Hopkins School of Medicine, and a Professor in the Department of Medicine, Division of Infectious Diseases. Ray also holds appointments in Viral Oncology and the Division of Health Sciences Informatics. He is affiliated with the Institute for Computational Medicine at Johns Hopkins and is licensed to practice medicine in Maryland.

Ray researches the influence of viral evolution on viral pathogenesis, concentrating in particular on complex RNA viruses such as hepatitis C virus (HCV) and human immunodeficiency virus (HIV). He has published approximately 100 scientific articles on HIV, HCV, or both.

== Education and training ==
As an undergraduate, Ray studied at the California Institute of Technology and graduated from Vanderbilt University with a B.S. cum laude in molecular biology. He remained at Vanderbilt for medical school and received his M.D. in 1990.

Ray completed a medical residency and both research and clinical fellowships in infectious diseases at the Johns Hopkins Hospital. In 1995, he became the assistant chief of service for the Department of Medicine at Johns Hopkins. Ray was appointed to an assistant professorship in 1997 and was promoted to associate professor in 2003.

== HIV research ==
Ray has studied the ability of HIV to undergo high levels of mutation in its genomic sequence, exploring the health consequences of this mutability. In 1999, Ray and colleagues reported on the sequence diversity of HIV in India. They cautioned that different subtypes could combine, thwarting traditional efforts to develop vaccines.

In 2005, along with colleagues including Robert F. Siliciano, Ray examined the phenomenon of viral "blips." HIV-positive patients who have suppressed HIV replication with the help of highly active antiretroviral therapy (HAART) occasionally exhibit apparent transient increases in the amount of virus in their blood, leading some scientists to express concern that these blips could allow the virus to develop drug resistance. The results of the 2005 study indicated that the virus was unable to gain resistance mutations during the blips, and that many of the blips could be attributed to statistical artifact.

Ray has also participated in the study of "elite suppressors," rare individuals who control HIV replication naturally and do not progress to AIDS quickly, even in the absence of treatment. With Joel Blankson and others, Ray contributed to a study of a monogamous husband-wife couple who were infected with the same strain of HIV but had very different responses to the virus. This work was published in 2008.

== HCV research ==
As HCV evades the immune system, Ray found, its genome not only mutates to escape the body's defenses, but also reverts to its previous, "ancestral" state when possible. This balance helps the virus to retain fitness.

Ray's work on HCV has characterized sources of selective pressure on the HCV genome and identified factors leading to HCV immune escape.

The interactions between HCV and HIV infections have also been a topic of interest for Ray. He has been interviewed by numerous media outlets, including Newsweek.

== Elected memberships ==
- American Society for Clinical Investigation
