= Best Ogedegbe =

Nigerian footballer

Best Anthony Ogedegbe
Personal information
- Date of birth: 3 September 1954
- Place of birth: Lagos, Lagos State, Nigeria
- Date of death: 28 September 2009 (aged 55)
- Place of death: Ibadan, Oyo, Nigeria
- Position: Goalkeeper

Senior career*
Years	Team	Apps	(Gls)
1974–1982	Shooting Stars F.C.		
1982–1986	Abiola Babes F.C.		

International career
1979–1983	Nigeria	31	(0)
- * Club domestic league appearances and goals

Best Ogedegbe (3 September 1954 – 28 September 2009) was a Nigerian football goalkeeper.

== Career ==
He played with Shooting Stars F.C. most of his career, and was the goalkeeper when Shooting Stars won Nigeria's first continental trophy, the African Cup Winners Cup in 1976.

== International career ==
Ogedegbe played for the Nigeria national football team (then known as the "Green Eagles") when they won the 1980 African Cup of Nations. He also represented Nigeria at the 1980 Summer Olympics in Moscow.

== Coaching career ==
Ogedegbe was an assistant coach during the 2008–09 season for the Dolphins F.C. He was also a former assistant with Wikki Tourists and the 2008 Summer Olympics silver medalist team.

== Death ==
He died, aged 55 at the University College Hospital in Ibadan on 28 September 2009. He had undergone eye surgery the previous week, but had lapsed into a coma following complications from the operation.

== Honours ==
Shooting Stars

- Nigerian Premier League: 1976, 1980
- Nigeria Federation Cup: 1977, 1979
- African Cup Winners' Cup: 1976

Nigeria

- All-Africa Games: Silver medal 1978
- Africa Cup of Nations: 1980

Individual

- Africa Cup of Nations Team of the Tournament: 1980
