= Braid (disambiguation) =

A braid is an interweaving of flexible strands of yarns, hair, wire, etc.

- Braid (hairstyle)

(The) Braid(s) may also refer to:

== Arts and media ==
=== Film ===
- Braid (film), a 2018 horror movie
- The Braid (film), a 2023 French drama film

=== Music ===
- Braid (band), an American emo and post-hardcore band from Illinois
- Braids (band), a Canadian art rock band
- The Braids, a duo known for their 1996 cover of "Bohemian Rhapsody"
- Braids (album), a live album by the Sam Rivers Quartet
- "Braids", a song by Previous Industries from the 2024 album Service Merchandise

=== Other uses in arts and media ===
- Braid (video game), a 2008 video game
- The Braid (Fr: Femme se coiffant), a painting by Pierre-Auguste Renoir
- The Braid (Fr: La Tresse), a 2017 novel by Laetitia Colombani

== Mathematics ==
- Braid theory, an abstract geometric theory in the field of topology
- Braid group, a type of object in braid theory

== People and fictional characters ==
- Braid (surname)
- Braids, a character in Magic: The Gathering
- Braid, a character seen on Who Wants to Be a Superhero?

== Places ==
- Braid Station, a Vancouver SkyTrain station
- Braid, a civil parish in County Antrim, Northern Ireland
- Braid in Edinburgh:
  - Hermitage of Braid
  - Braid Hills
  - Braid Burn

== Other uses ==
- Braided river, a type of river pattern
- Operation Braid, the official investigation into the murder of Joanna Yeates, a high-profile case from 2010 in the United Kingdom

== See also ==
- Braided, a Canadian singing ensemble
- Der Zopf, German for "braid", a solitaire card game
- French braid, a hairstyle
