= Peter Lamptey =

Ghanaian footballer (1946–2025)

Personal information
- Date of birth: 6 April 1946
- Place of birth: Ghana
- Date of death: 9 October 2025 (aged 79)
- Place of death: Accra, Ghana
- Height: 1.80 m (5 ft 11 in)
- Position: Forward

Senior career*
Years	Team	Apps	(Gls)
1970–1979	Hearts of Oak		(79)
1980	Great Olympics		(8)
Total			(87)

International career
1971–1973	Ghana	6	(0)
- * Club domestic league appearances and goals

Peter Lamptey (6 April 1946 – 9 October 2025) was a Ghanaian footballer who played as a forward. He spent most of his club football with Hearts of Oak and Great Olympics, becoming top scorer in the Ghanaian league in 1973. He made six appearances for the Ghana national team.

== Club career ==
While playing with Hearts of Oak, Lamptey, together with Mohammed Polo, Mama Acquah, Robert Hammond and Anas Seidu were known as "The fearsome fivesome". He was often referred to as the "goal thief" for his scoring prowess. He was the Ghana Premier League top scorer in 1973 when he scored 26 goals in 21 matches, and he captained the side to the African Cup of Champions Clubs finals in 1977.

He later spent the 1980 season at Accra Great Olympics where he scored eight goals before he retired.

== International career ==
In 1971, Lamptey was invited to the Ghana national team for the first time. He was in the Ghana team that participated in the 1972 Summer Olympics football tournament. He was the youngest player in the team at 26 years, 144 days and featured in all Ghana's matches played.

== Death ==
Lamptey died in Accra on 9 October 2025, at the age of 79.

== Career statistics ==
=== Club ===
Appearances and goals by club, season and competition
Club	Season	League			African Cup of Champions Clubs	
Club	Season	Division	Apps	Goals	Apps	Goals
Hearts of Oak	1972	Ghana Premier League				2+
Hearts of Oak	1973	Ghana Premier League	21	26		
Hearts of Oak	1977	Ghana Premier League				1+
Hearts of Oak	Total			79		
Great Olympics	1980	Ghana Premier League		8	—	
Career total				87	—	

=== International ===
Appearances and goals by national team and year
National team	Year	Apps	Goals
Ghana	1971	0	0
Ghana	1972	5	0
Ghana	1973	1	0
Total		6	0

== Honours ==
Hearts of Oak

- Ghana Premier League: 1971, 1973, 1976, 1978, 1979
- Ghanaian FA Cup: 1973, 1974, 1979
- African Cup of Champions Clubs runner up: 1977, 1979

Individual

- Ghana Premier League top scorer: 1973
