= Braide =

Braide is a family name. Notable people with the surname include:

- Chris Braide, an English songwriter, record producer and singer
- Eduardo Braide, a Brazilian lawyer and politician
- Garrick Sokari Braide, an African preacher
- Ekanem Ikpi Braide, a Nigerian Parasitologist

== See also ==
- Braid (surname)
