= Byaruhanga =

Byaruhanga is a surname. Notable people with the surname include:

- Beatrice Ayuru Byaruhanga (born 1970s), Ugandan entrepreneur and school founder
- Peter Byaruhanga (born 1979), Ugandan footballer
- William Byaruhanga, Ugandan lawyer and businessman

== See also ==
- Kasirye Byaruhanga, Ugandan law firm
