= Fuseini Salifu =

Ghanaian footballer

Personal information
- Full name: Fuseini Salifu
- Place of birth: Ghana
- Position: Goalkeeper

Senior career*
Years	Team	Apps	(Gls)
- Kumasi Cornerstones
- Asante Kotoko

International career
1978–1980	Ghana		
Medal record
Representing Ghana
Men's football
Africa Cup of Nations
Winner	1978 Ghana
- * Club domestic league appearances and goals

Fuseini Salifu is a Ghanaian former professional footballer. During his playing career he played as a goalkeeper for Kumasi Asante Kotoko and Kumasi Cornerstones. At the international level, he is known for his involvement in the squad that won the 1978 African Cup of Nations.

== International career ==
He was key member, serving as back up goalkeeper to Joseph Carr for the squad that played in both the and 1978, 1980 African Cup of Nations helping Ghana to make history as the first country to win the competition three times and for keeps during the 1978 edition, after scoring Uganda 2–0 in the finals.
