= Wasiu Taiwo =

Nigerian footballer

Personal information
- Full name: Wasio Taiwo
- Date of birth: 1 October 1976 (age 50)
- Place of birth: Lagos, Nigeria
- Height: 1.77 m (5 ft 10 in)
- Positions: Striker; attacking midfielder

Team information
- Current team: Oluyole Warriors

Senior career*
Years	Team	Apps	(Gls)
1995–1996	Shooting Stars		
1996–1997	De Graafschap	19	(4)
1997–2003	MVV Maastricht	188	(54)
2003–2005	AGOVV Apeldoorn	63	(13)
2005–2007	Fortuna Sittard	66	(23)
2007–2008	FC Harreither WY	9	(2)
2008–2010	Shooting Stars S.C.		

International career
1995	Nigeria	3	(1)
- * Club domestic league appearances and goals

Wasiu Taiwo (born 1 October 1976 in Lagos) is a Nigerian retired footballer who last played for Shooting Stars S.C.

== Club career ==
Taiwo played football in the Netherlands for 10 years and after that he played in Austria for one year. He began his career at Shooting Stars F.C. In the summer of 2008 he moved from Austria to Shooting Stars S.C. where he was reunited with his former teammate Edith Agoye.

== International career ==
Taiwo made several appearances for the Nigeria national football team. He scored on his debut, a US Cup match against the United States in 1995.
