= Dan Kayede =

Ghanaian footballer

Personal information
- Full name: Dan Kayede
- Position: Forward

Senior career*
Years	Team	Apps	(Gls)
1973–1985	Accra Great Olympics	-	(-)

International career
1977–1984	Ghana	-	(-)
- * Club domestic league appearances and goals

Dan Kayede is a Ghanaian former professional footballer who played for Accra Great Olympics F.C. At the international level, he is known for his involvement in the squad that won the 1978 African Cup of Nations.

== Club career ==
Ansah started his career Accra Great Olympics. He rose to become an integral member of the senior team.

== International career ==
Ansah was a member of the Ghana national team from 1977 to 1984. He was key member of the squad that played in both the and 1978, 1980 African Cup of Nations helping Ghana to make history as the first country to win the competition three times and for keeps during the 1978 edition, after scoring Uganda 2–0 in the finals.

== Personal life ==
Kayede's brother is Ben Kayede, who is also an international footballer who won the 1982 AFCON playing for Ghana.

== Honours ==
Club

Accra Great Olympics

- Ghanaian FA Cup: 1983

International

Ghana

- African Cup of Nations: 1978
