= Edith Agoye =

Nigerian footballer (born 1976)

Personal information
- Full name: Edith Olumide Alumeida Agoye
- Date of birth: 19 January 1976 (age 50)
- Place of birth: Nigeria
- Height: 1.81 m (5 ft 11 in)
- Position: Attacking midfielder

Senior career*
Years	Team	Apps	(Gls)
1994–1995	Shooting Stars S.C.	42	(21)
1996–1997	FC Schaffhausen	34	(12)
1997–1998	Rot-Weiß Oberhausen	10	(0)
1999–2000	Espérance Sportive de Tunis	24	(1)
2001	SV Braunau	17	(6)
2002–2004	Shooting Stars S.C.	10	(1)
2004–2005	Bnei Sakhnin F.C.	27	(10)
2005–2006	Maccabi Herzliya F.C.	1	(0)
2006	Hapoel Be'er Sheva	4	(0)
2007	Julius Berger F.C.	20	(6)
2008	Enyimba International F.C.	7	(3)
2008–2009	Shooting Stars S.C.	31	(10)

International career
2002	Nigeria	1	(0)
- * Club domestic league appearances and goals as of 31 December 2006

Edith Olumide Alumeida Agoye (born 19 January 1976) is a Nigerian retired footballer who last played for Shooting Stars S.C.

== Career ==
Agoye, along with his former teammate Wasiu Taiwo, moved in the summer of 2008 to Shooting Stars SC. He became an assistant coach for 3 SC in 2013. He resigned as Head coach in 2019 after 3SC failed to get promoted.
