= Afri Art Fashion Show =

Annual international fashion week held in Kampala, Uganda

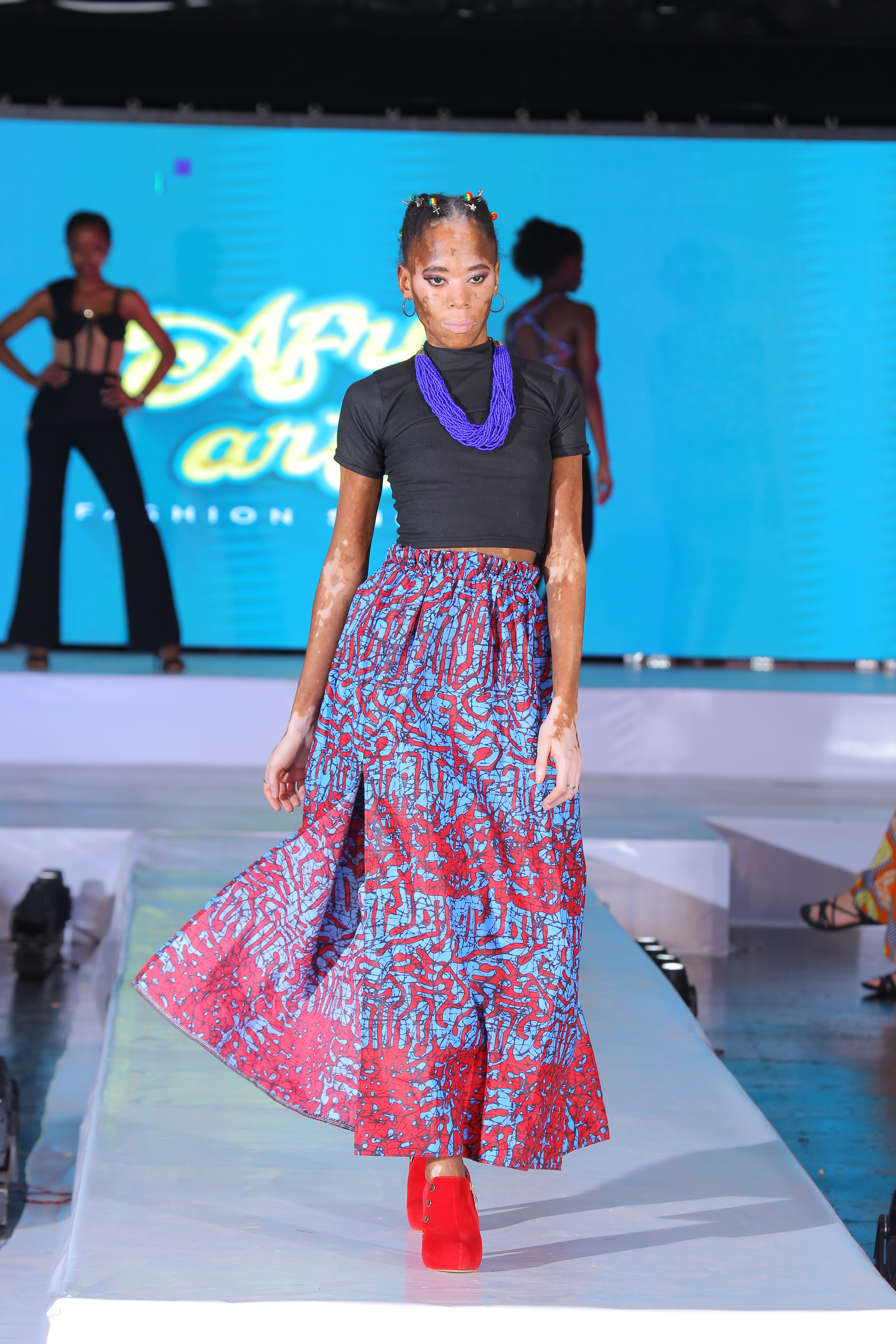
- Status: Active
- Genre: Fashion
- Frequency: Annual
- Locations: Kampala, Uganda
- Established: 2021
- Founders: Nalwoga Cerinah Kasirye
- Most recent: 2024
- Organiser: Trillion Looks Stores
- Website: afriartfashionshow.com

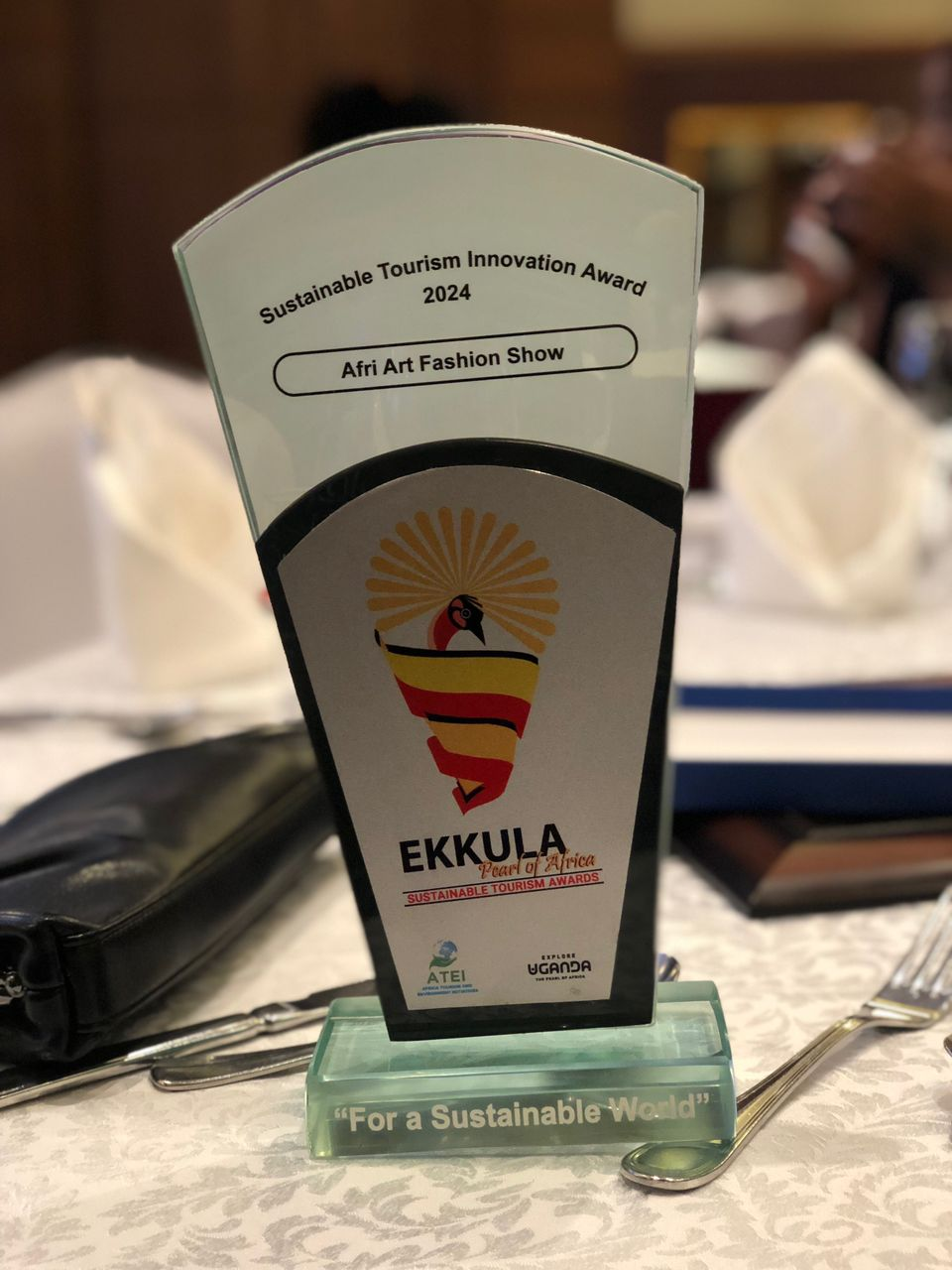
Ekkula Tourism Awards accolade awarded to Afri Art Fashion Show for the best Sustainable Tourism Innovation Award 2024 category

Africa Art Fashion Show is an annual international fashion week, held in Kampala, Uganda, that highlights African culture in a series of fashion shows, events, educational seminars, and workshops. The event features collections that reflect the traditions of Africa and the local designers in Uganda.

== History ==
Started in 2022 by Nalwoga Cerinah Kasirye, the event focused on marginalised girls and youths who managed to come up with unique designs for the show with an African touch. The second edition was held on July 15, 2023 at Motiv in Bugolobi, Kampala, and combined a runway show with an art exhibition. At that edition, Nalwoga used the show as a platform against the stigma faced by people with vitiligo, with models who have the condition walking the runway.

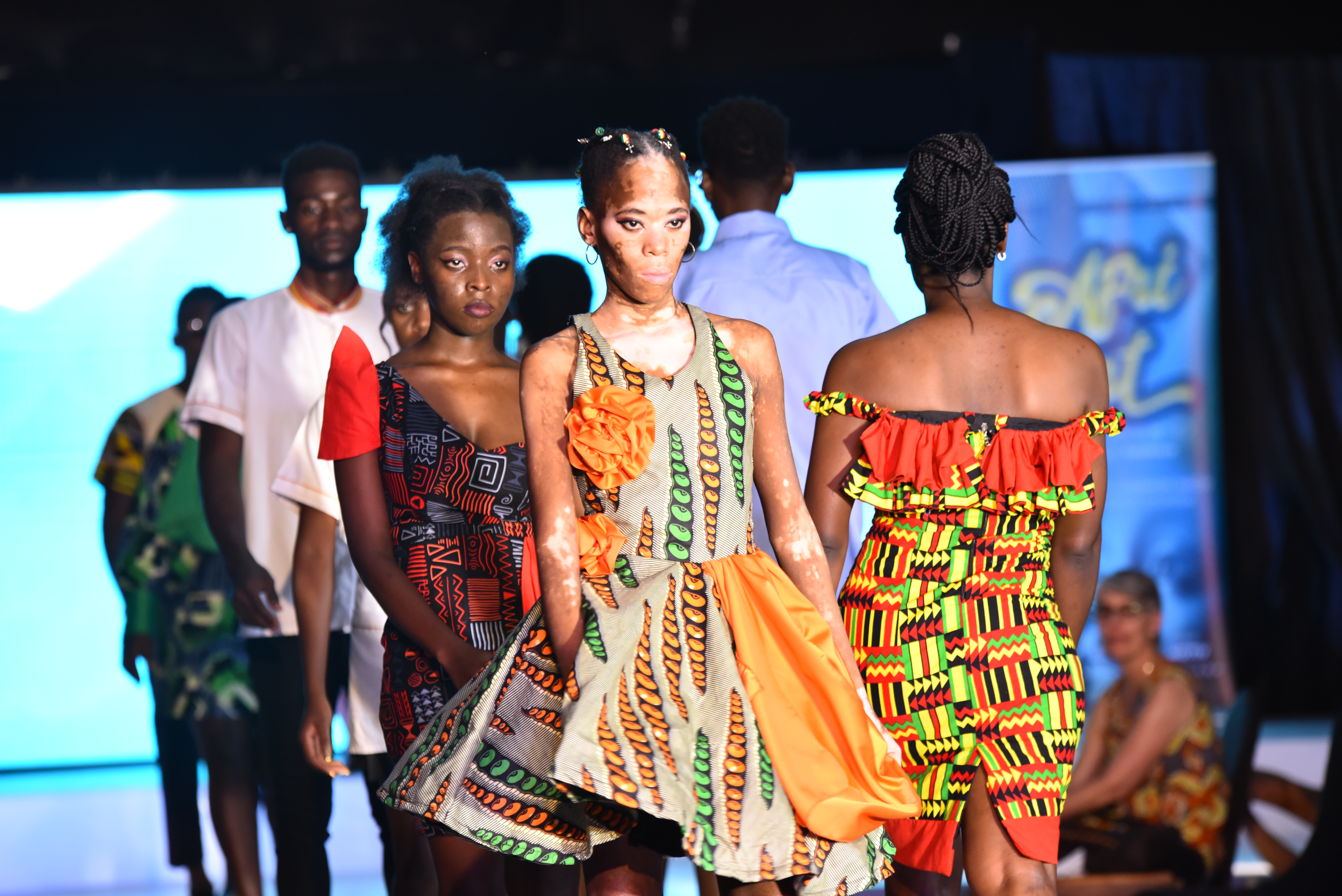
A model with vitiligo on the runway at the 2023 show

== Editions ==
Editions of the Afri Art Fashion Show
Dates	Theme	Venue	Guest of honour
July 16, 2022	Empowering Women Artisans		Grace Mbabazi Awulo
July 15, 2023	Travel Through Fashion (The Battle Against Vitiligo Stigma)	Motiv, Bugolobi	Ellen B Masi
July 13th, 2024	Celebrating timeless beauty		Amy Petersen
August 15–23, 2025	My Heritage, My Hustle	Motiv, Bugolobi	

== Afri Art Fashion Awards ==
The first Afri Art Fashion Awards were presented at the close of the 2025 edition, which had expanded from a single day into a week-long programme. ORM Streetwear was named Designer of the Year, Cohen Amanya Menswear Designer and Sauda Namuwonge Womenswear Designer, while Adikini Immaculate and Alex Muwanga were named Female and Male Model of the Year.

== See also ==
- List of fashion events
