= Garrick Sokari Braide =

Garrick Sokari Braide (1882-1918) was an African preacher. Braide was born in Obonoma in the Niger Delta region, and grew up in Bakana. He was baptized in 1910 at the age of 28, and was confirmed in 1912.

Braide offered an African alternative to traditional evangelism. Rather than teaching creeds, he campaigned mainly on the destruction of idols. Braide also campaigned particularly effectively against alcohol consumption.

After successes at healing people, Braide began to be viewed by his followers as a prophet. The decrease in alcohol consumption led authorities, worried about decreased tax revenue, to investigate him. Braide was arrested in March 1916 on charges including disturbing the peace. Braide was released from prison in 1918, and died later that year.

His followers established the Christ Army Church of Nigeria in 1916.
