= Joseph Ladipo =

Nigerian footballer (1941–2013)

Personal information
- Full name: Pa Joseph Ladipo
- Date of birth: 10 July 1941
- Place of birth: Ibadan, Nigeria
- Date of death: 9 May 2013 (aged 71)
- Place of death: Ibadan, Nigeria

Senior career*
Years	Team	Apps	(Gls)
1961–1973	Shooting Stars		

Managerial career
- 1973–1977: Shooting Stars (assistant)
- 1977–1982: Shooting Stars
- 1982–1988: Leventis United
- 1990–1992: Shooting Stars
- 2007–2008: Nigeria Women
- * Club domestic league appearances and goals

Pa Joseph Ladipo (10 July 1941 – 9 May 2013) was a Nigerian football player and manager.

== Career ==
During his playing career, Ladipo played for Shooting Stars until 1973. Upon his retirement, he became the club's assistant manager, before being promoted to the first team coach in 1977. From 1982 to 1988, he was the manager of Leventis United. He then returned to manage Shooting Stars from 1990 to 1992.

Ladipo was the head coach of the Nigeria women's national team at the 2008 Summer Olympics. He also led Nigeria to win the 2007 All-Africa Games, and finished third place at the 2008 African Women's Championship.

== Personal life ==
Ladipo was born in Ibadan, and was nicknamed Jossy Lad. He died on 9 May 2013 at his home in Ibadan at the age of 71.
