= Qamar Adegoke =

Nigeria Professional Footballer

Personal information
- Full name: Qamar Wale Adegoke
- Date of birth: July 14, 2004 (age 22)
- Place of birth: Nigeria
- Position: Forward

Team information
- Current team: Shooting Stars
- Number: 12

Senior career*
Years	Team	Apps	(Gls)
2024-2025	Nasarawa United	18	(3)
2025-	Shooting Stars	30	(9)
- * Club domestic league appearances and goals as of 31 May 2026

Qamar Wale Adegoke is a Nigerian professional footballer who plays as a forward for Shooting Stars S.C. in the Nigeria Premier Football League (NPFL).

== Club career ==
Adegoke played for Nasarawa United before joining Shooting Stars S.C. ahead of the 2025–26 NPFL season. In January 2026, he scored the winning goal in Shooting Stars' league victory that ended the club's run of matches without a win. In another league match during the 2025–26 season, Adegoke scored a late goal in a victory over Rivers United.
