= Ogaden Anbassa =

Association football club in Ethiopia

- Full name: Ogaden Anbassa
- Ground: Harrar Bira Stadium; Harar, Ethiopia
- Capacity: 10,000
- League: Ethiopian Premier League

Ogaden Anbassa is an Ethiopian football club based in Harar. They are a member of the Ethiopian Football Federation national league.

In 1978 the team has won the Ethiopian Premier League.

== Stadium ==
Their home stadium is Harrar Bira Stadium.

== Achievements ==
- :Ethiopian Premier League

1978

== Performance in CAF competitions ==
- CAF Confederation Cup: 1 appearance

1979 African Cup of Champions Clubs – first Round
