= Siegfried Bahner =

German football coach

Personal information
- Place of birth: Germany

Managerial career
- Years: Team
- Hearts of Oak
- Shooting Stars

Siegfried Bahner is a German football coach.

== Career ==
Bahner has coached a number of teams in Africa, including Hearts of Oak of Ghana and Shooting Stars of Nigeria, where he was sacked and then re-hired within the space of 24 hours.

After Samson Siasia left Nigerian club Heartland to manage the Nigerian national team, Bahner was one of four European coaches named on the shortlist to replace him.
