= Emmanuel Ofei Ansah =

Ghanaian footballer

Ofei Ansah
Personal information
- Full name: Emmanuel Ofei Ansah
- Date of birth: 6 June 1953
- Date of death: 8 June 2005 (aged 52)
- Position: Defender

Youth career
- 1972–1973: Auroras FC

Senior career*
Years	Team	Apps	(Gls)
1973–1986	Accra Hearts of Oak	-	(-)
1986–1990	Kumapim Stars	-	(-)
1991–1993	Okwawu United	-	(-)

International career
1975–1986	Ghana	-	(-)

Managerial career
- 1996–2004: Accra Hearts of Oak (assistant)
- 2005: Accra Hearts of Oak
- * Club domestic league appearances and goals

Emmanuel Ofei Ansah (6 June 1953 – 8 June 2005) was a Ghanaian former professional footballer and manager. During his playing career he played as a defender for Accra Hearts of Oak. At the international level, he is known for his involvement in the squad that won the 1978 African Cup of Nations. Whilst serving as the manager of Accra Hearts of Oak, on 7 June 2005, he collapsed after a Ghana Premier league match and was rushed to the Ridge Hospital, Accra, but died the following day.

== Early life ==
Ansah was born on 6 June 1953 to David Ansah and Florence Quao both from Accra. He was a Ga. His potential as a talented footballer was discovered early when he started for the colts' teams like Falcom Dwellers, Salami Aces and Bukum Young Hearts before joining Auroras FC.

== Club career ==
Ansah started his career with the youth side of Accra Hearts of Oak, Auroras FC. He rose to become an integral member of the senior team of which he also served as captain. Over his playing career he won the Ghana Premier League on six occasions, the Ghanaian FA Cup on four occasions. He was part of the team's side that lost in two African Cup of Champions Clubs finals in the 1970s, in 1977 and 1979. Due to his aggressive and combative style of playing he earned the nick name ''The Rock of Gibraltar''. He was a dead-ball specialist noted for bending free kicks. He later went on to play for Kumapim Stars and Okwawu United in the late 1980s and early 1990s before retiring.

== International career ==
Ansah was a member of the Ghana national team from 1975 to 1986. He was key member of the squad that played in both the and 1978, 1980 African Cup of Nations helping Ghana to make history as the first country to win the competition three times and for keeps during the 1978 edition, after scoring Uganda 2–0 in the finals.

== Coaching career ==
Ansah started his coaching career whilst playing for Okwawu United as a player-coach. He later joined his former club Hearts of Oak in 1996 as an assistant coach and a key member of the technical team. In 2000, he was the assistant coach to Jones Attuquayefio who incidentally was his uncle and role model, when they won the treble, the 2000 Ghana Premier League, Ghanaian FA Cup and Confederation of Africa (CAF) Champions League and Super Cup in 2001.

From 1996 to 2004, whilst serving as the assistant coach he helped them to win the league 6 times, FA Cup twice, Ghana Super Cup three times and the first ever Confederation Cup in 2004. He also doubled as the head coach of the youth side, Auroras FC. In 2004, he served under Ernst Middendorp and Archibald Lamptey before being promoted to caretaker manager in 2005 after latter was relieved of his duties.

On 7 June 2005, after match day 8, at full time of a 1–0 home victory over Liberty Professionals at the Ohene Djan Sports Stadium, he collapsed and was rushed to the Ridge Hospital, Accra after first aid treatment but he died the following day. He led them to 5 wins in 7 matches with Hearts at the apex of the league table.

== Personal life ==
Ansah died on 8 June 2005, two days after his 52nd birthday and a month after Hearts' goalkeepers coach Salifu Ansah died. He was survived by a wife and four children.

He was buried on 30 July 2005 at the Osu Cemetery, with the funeral taking place at the Ohene Djan Sports Stadium. Prior to the burial and pre-burial celebration, a farewell football gala was held in his honour on the morning of the funeral with the Accra Hearts of Oak Old Players Association (AHOOPA) and a group of foreign based footballers including Tony Yeboah, Arthur Moses and Ablade Kumah taking part.

== Honours ==
=== Club ===
Hearts of Oak

- Ghana Premier League: 1973, 1976, 1978, 1979, 1984, 1986
- Ghanaian FA Cup: 1973, 1974, 1979, 1981
- Ghana Super Cup: 1973, 1979
- African Cup of Champions Clubs runner up: 1977, 1979

=== International ===
Ghana

- African Cup of Nations: 1978
