= Joseph Blankson =

Nigerian

- Born: 28 October 1979; Bakana, Rivers, Nigeria
- Died: 28 July 2018 (aged 38); Rivers, Nigeria
- Known for: Heroism

Joseph Blankson, also known as Joe Blankson (29 October 1979 – 28 July 2018), was a Nigerian contractor who died while saving 13 victims of a boat accident on the Abonnema-Bakana waterway in Rivers State on 28 July 2018.

== Early life and career ==
Blankson was born in Bakana Degema, Rivers State, Nigeria on 29 October 1979, the second son of Elizabeth Blankson and her late husband.

Blankson was a contractor working with an oil and gas company in Port Harcourt, where he supplied diesel.

== Boat accident ==
On Saturday 28 July 2018, the boat carrying 25 passengers left Abonnema Wharf for Bakana. Blankson and his sister were traveling to Bakana for a funeral. It was raining heavily during the boat's passage and the river was full of debris. Eventually the boat capsized.

Blankson swam in and out of the river 13 times to rescue the passengers. Suffering from exhaustion, he drowned on the 14th rescue attempt. It was reported that Blankson was the only fatality in the boat accident.

== Personal life ==
Blankson met his wife Mercy Blankson, a Microbiology graduate, in 2012 at their NYSC camp in Obubra, Cross River State. They got married the following year and had three children, but lost one as a result of a fire accident on 25 December 2016.

== Death and legacy ==
Blankson's body was recovered a day later after the accident; he was buried the same day in the river according to customs over drowning. A service of songs in honour of the deceased was held and well attended.

On 29 July 2019, The Joe Blankson Foundation and swimming academy was set up in his honour by his wife and family to teach swimming and safety procedures for maritime travel.

== Recognition ==
The senate president, Bukola Saraki and former vice president, Atiku Abubakar both tweeted about the incident, praising the heroic act of Blankson.

The Rivers State Governor, Nyesom Wike promised to support Blankson's family. On 2 October 2021, President Muhammad Buhari honored Blankson with the "Presidential Special Award for Bravery and Patriotism", which was presented to his wife and two children.
