= Lamine Ben Aziza =

Tunisian football goalkeeper

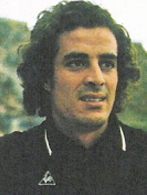

Personal information
- Date of birth: 10 November 1952 (age 73)
- Place of birth: Tunisia
- Position: Goalkeeper

Senior career*
Years	Team	Apps	(Gls)
- Étoile Sportive du Sahel

International career
- Tunisia
- * Club domestic league appearances and goals

Lamine Ben Aziza (born 10 November 1952) is a Tunisian football goalkeeper who played for Tunisia, including at the 1978 FIFA World Cup. He also played for Étoile Sportive du Sahel.
