= Nalwoga Cerinah Kasirye =

Ugandan businesswoman

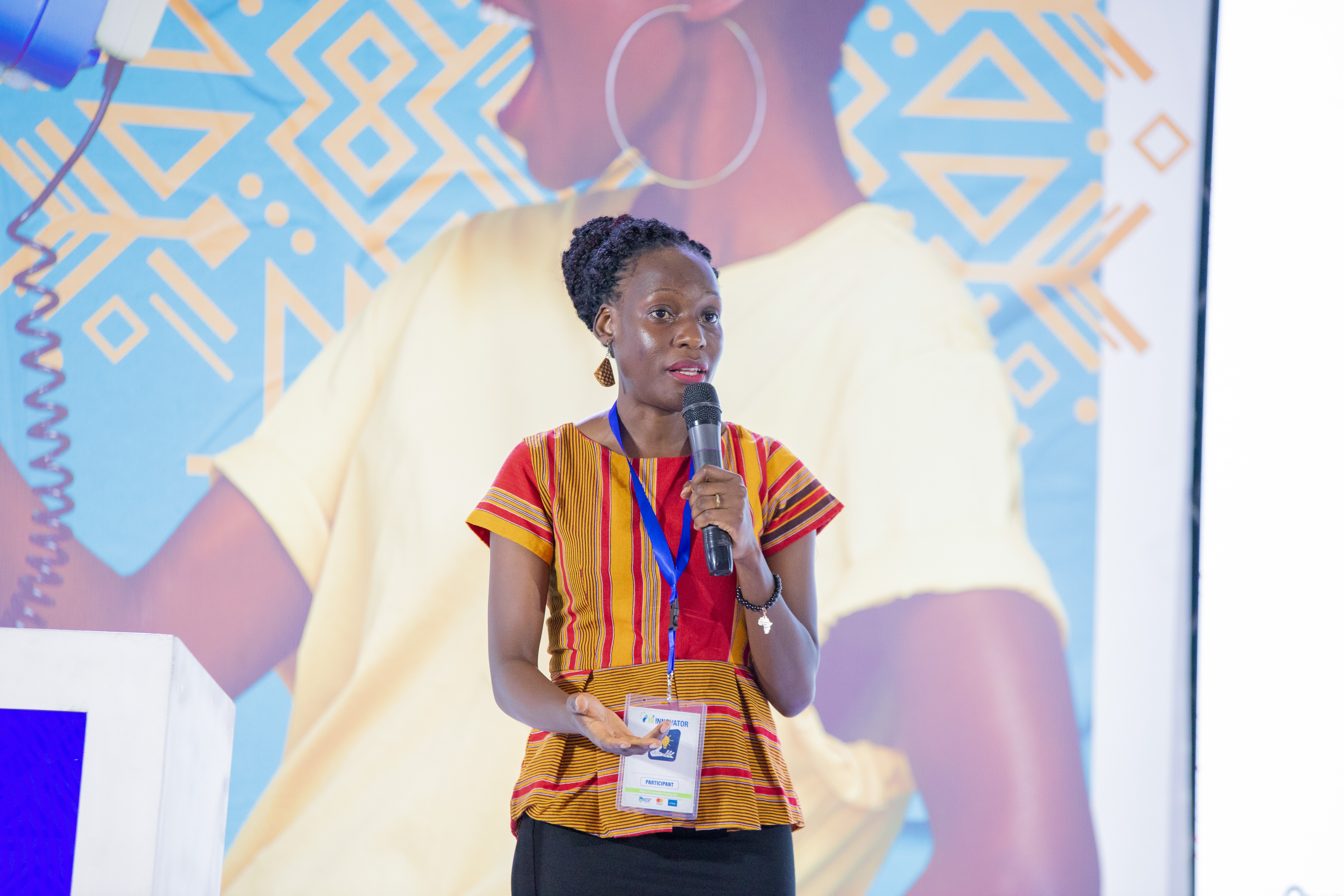
- Known for: Founder of Afri art fashion show
- Spouse: Arthur Kasirye
- Awards: Best CFO SME Category 2018, Best Woman Entrepreneur Startupper 2022 Ekkula Sustainable Tourism Innovation Award 2024

Nalwoga Cerinah Kasirye is a Ugandan executive, businesswoman and entrepreneur. Cerinah is the founder and CEO of Afri Art Fashion Show, Trillion Looks Store a handicraft social enterprise, working with women and youth artisans to develop and promote Ugandan Souvenir handicrafts She has several advisory positions including MD at Eden Conserve.

== Career ==
Cerinah was born in Mukono, Uganda. She gained a bachelor's degree in Textiles and Ginning Engineering from the Busitema University and studied ACCA Chartered Accounting from MAT ABACUS Business School. She worked at National Arts and Cultural Crafts Uganda and Artisanal trainer under Ministry of Tourism under the Handicraft and Souvenir Project.

In 2020, she founded Trillion Looks Store, a fashion business development agency that primarily focuses on accelerating the Ugandan and African Fashion Industry.

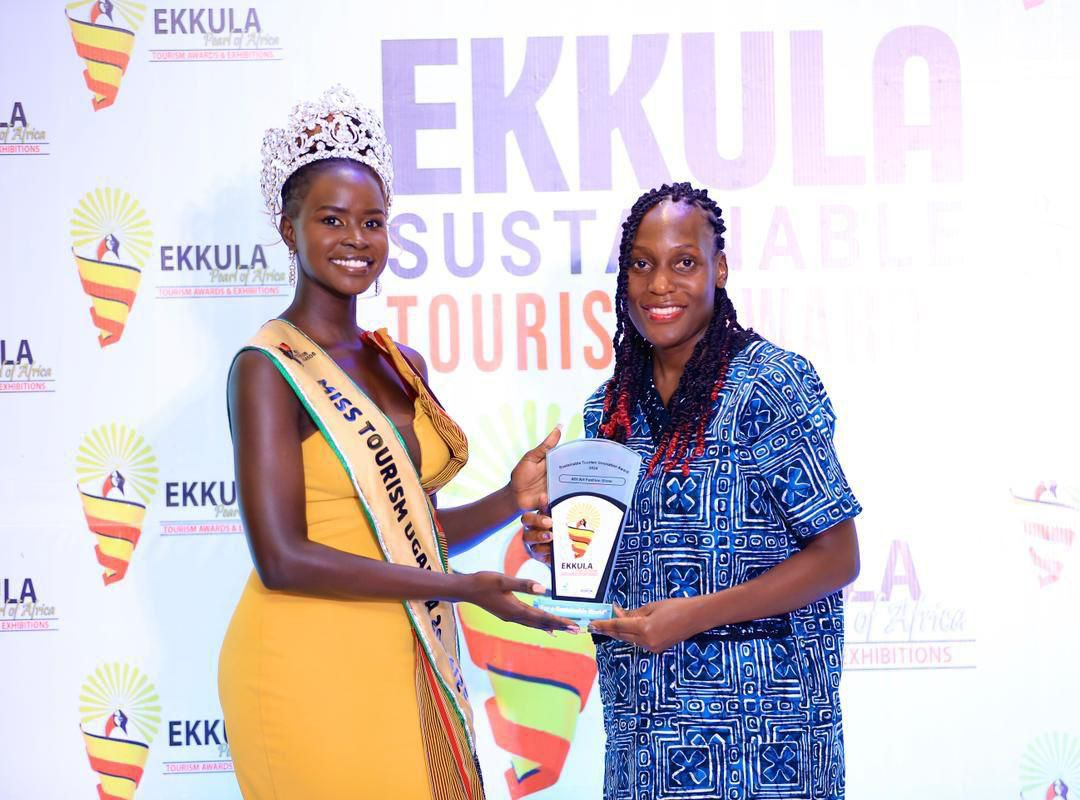
Nalwoga Cerinah Kasirye receives the 2024 Ekkula Sustainable Tourism Innovation Award on behalf of the Afri Art Fashion Show.

In 2021, she launched Afri Art Fashion Show which is an annual four day event showcasing Ugandan and African fashion. Based in Kampala, it is Uganda's largest clothing and Handicraft trade show and brings together designers, buyers, manufacturers and the media.

In 2022 the Afri Art Fashion Show focused on marginalised girls and youths who managed to come up with unique designs for the show with an African Touch. In 2023, Ms Nalwoga Cerinah, used the show as a platform to fight stigma against vitiligo

== Personal life ==
Cerinah is married to Kasirye Arthur, a Ugandan IT entrepreneur.

== Awards and honours ==
- Best CFO SME Category 2018
- Best Woman Entrepreneur Startupper 2022
- Ekkula Sustainable Tourism Innovation Award 2024 - Afri art fashion show
