= Modeste Dah =

Burkinabé footballer

Personal information
- Date of birth: 13 May 1953 (age 73)
- Place of birth: Upper Volta
- Position: Defender

Senior career*
Years	Team	Apps	(Gls)
- Rail Club du Kadiogo

International career
1975–1978	Upper Volta	1	(0)
- * Club domestic league appearances and goals

Modeste Dah is an Upper Volta football defender who played for Upper Volta in the 1978 African Cup of Nations. He also played for Rail Club du Kadiogo
