= 1979 African Cup of Champions Clubs =

Tournament details
- Teams: 28 (from 1 confederation)

Final positions
- Champions: (Cameroon) Union Douala (1st title)
- Runners-up: (Ghana) Hearts of Oak

Tournament statistics
- Matches played: 45
- Goals scored: 100 (2.22 per match)
- Top scorer: (Tanzania) Ally Thuwem (3 goals)

The 1979 African Cup of Champions Clubs was the 15th edition of the annual international club football competition held in the CAF region (Africa), the African Cup of Champions Clubs. It determined that year's club champion of association football in Africa.

The tournament was played by 28 teams and was used a playoff scheme with home and away matches. Union Douala from Cameroon won that final, and became for the first time CAF club champion.

== First round ==
Team 1	Agg.	Team 2	1st leg	2nd leg
ASDR Fatima (Central African Republic)	2–2 (4–5 p)	(Republic of Upper Volta) Silures Bobo-Dioulasso	1–1	1–1
Al-Ahli Tripoli (Libya)	1–4	(Algeria) MP Alger	1–2	0–2
Kenya Breweries	n/p^{1}	(Sudan) Al-Merrikh	—	—
Desportivo Maputo (Mozambique)	3–3 (a)	(Lesotho) Matlama FC	3–2	0–1
Dragons de l'Ouémé (Benin)	1–5	(Ivory Coast) Africa Sports	0–2	1–3
Etoile du Congo (Republic of the Congo)	3–1	(Gabon) FC 105 Libreville	2–0	1–1
Mighty Blackpool (Sierra Leone)	2–2 (2–4 p)	(Ghana) Hearts of Oak	2–0	0–2
Ogaden Anbassa (Ethiopia)	w/o^{2}	(Malawi) Bata Bullets	—	—
Saint Joseph Warriors (Liberia)	0–1	(The Gambia) Real Banjul	0–0	0–1
Simba SC (Tanzania)	5–4	(Zambia) Mufulira Wanderers	0–4	5–0
US Gorée (Senegal)	3–1	(Mauritania) ASC Garde Nationale	2–0	1–1
Zamalek (Egypt)	4–1	(Uganda) Simba FC	2–1	w/o^{3}

^{1} Both teams withdrew; the tie was scratched.
^{2} Bata Bullets withdrew.
^{3} Simba FC did not show up for the second leg.

== Second round ==
Team 1	Agg.	Team 2	1st leg	2nd leg
Africa Sports (Ivory Coast)	1–2	(Zaire) CS Imana	1–0	0–2
Etoile du Congo (Republic of the Congo)	2–4	(Senegal) US Gorée	2–3	0–1
Hafia FC (Guinea)	1–1 (1–0 p)	(Republic of Upper Volta) Silures Bobo-Dioulasso	1–0	0–1
Hearts of Oak (Ghana)	3–1	(The Gambia) Real Banjul	2–0	1–1
MP Alger (Algeria)	2–2 (1–2 p)	(Cameroon) Union Douala	2–0	0–2
Simba SC (Tanzania)	0–2	(Nigeria) Raccah Rovers	0–0	0–2
Zamalek SC (Egypt)	w/o^{1}	(Ethiopia) Ogaden Anbassa	—	—
Matlama FC (Lesotho)	bye^{2}			

^{1} Ogaden Anbassa withdrew.
^{2} Matlama FC were drawn against the winner of the tie between Kenya Breweries and Al-Merrikh, but both teams withdrew.

== Quarter-finals ==
Team 1	Agg.	Team 2	1st leg	2nd leg
Hafia FC (Guinea)	2–3	(Ghana) Hearts of Oak	2–0	0–3
Matlama FC (Lesotho)	1–5	(Cameroon) Union Douala	1–3	0–2
US Gorée (Senegal)	2–1	(Nigeria) Raccah Rovers	2–0	0–1
Zamalek (Egypt)	3–2	(Zaire) CS Imana	3–1	0–1^{1}

^{1} The 2nd leg was abandoned with CS Imana leading 1-0 due to a pitch invasion and crowd disturbances; Zamalek were ejected from the competition.

== Semi-finals ==
Team 1	Agg.	Team 2	1st leg	2nd leg
CS Imana (Zaire)	1–3	(Cameroon) Union Douala	1–2	0–1
US Gorée (Senegal)	2–6	(Ghana) Hearts of Oak	1–2	1–4

== Final ==
2 December 1979
--:-- UTC+0

Hearts of Oak (Ghana)	1–0	(Cameroon) Union Douala
Yawson 87'

Accra Sports Stadium, Accra
16 December 1979
--:-- UTC+1

Union Douala (Cameroon)	1–0	(Ghana) Hearts of Oak
Bell 90' (pen.)
Penalties
	5–3

Stade Omnisports, Yaoundé
Attendance: 90 000

Union Douala	Hearts of Oak

== Champion ==
1979 African Cup of Champions Clubs winners
(Cameroon)
Union Douala
First title

== Top scorers ==
The top scorers from the 1979 African Cup of Champions Clubs are as follows:

Rank	Name	Team	Goals
1	(Tanzania) Ally Thuwen	(Tanzania) Simba SC	3
2	(Algeria) Bouzid Mahiouz	(Algeria) MP Alger	2
2	(Cameroon) Teni Yerima	(Cameroon) Union Douala	2
2	(Egypt) Hassan Shehata	(Egypt) Zamalek	2
2	(Ghana) Mohammed Polo	(Ghana) Hearts of Oak	2
2	(Ghana) John Nketia Yawson	(Ghana) Hearts of Oak	2
2	(Tanzania) George Kulagwa	(Tanzania) Simba SC	2
