= Isaiah Blankson =

Ghanaian scientist, academic, and aerospace engineer (1944–2021)

Isaiah M. Blankson (September 28, 1944 – November 19, 2021) was a Ghanaian scientist, academic and aerospace engineer.

== Biography ==
Isaiah Blankson was born on September 28, 1944, in Cape Coast, Ghana. He had his secondary school education at the prestigious Mfantsipim School where he was a peer of Kofi Annan. He sat for his GCE Advanced Level (United Kingdom) in 1964 and aced all his examinations making him the best student in West Africa that year. He gained a scholarship to pursue a degree at Massachusetts Institute of Technology. His scholarship was from an initiative to foster international, cultural and educational exchange between students from various African countries and the United States Information Agency. As a result of the African Scholarship Program of American Universities, Isaiah Blankson earned his bachelor's degree in Aeronautics and Astronautics in 1969. He pursued a master's degree and graduated in 1970 subsequent to which he earned a Ph.D. in 1973 also in aeronautics and astronautics. Upon his completion, he became the first African to hold a PhD in Aerospace Engineering. In 1988, he started working for NASA. His projects ranged from research into hypersonics to water purification. He died on November 19, 2021, at the age of 77.

== Awards and Honors ==
He was a Presidential Rank Award recipient and NASA Exceptional Service Medal winner.
