= Braid (surname) =

Braid is a surname. Notable people with the surname include:

- Daniel Braid (born 1981), New Zealand rugby union footballer
- David Braid (musician) (born 1975), Canadian jazz pianist and composer
- Hilda Braid (1929–2007), English actress
- James Braid (golfer) (1870–1950), Scottish professional golfer
- James Braid (surgeon) (1795–1860), Scottish neurosurgeon and pioneer of hypnotism
- Kate Braid (born 1947), Canadian poet
- Sean Braid (born 1994), actor
- Yvonne Braid (1942–2025), Australian politician and radio station manager

== See also ==
- Braid
- Brady
- Braide
