= Laurent Banady =

Burkinabé footballer

Laurent Banadi
Personal information
- Place of birth: Upper Volta
- Position: Defender

International career
Years	Team	Apps	(Gls)
1976–1978	Upper Volta	1	(0)

Laurent Banadi is an Upper Volta football defender who played for Upper Volta in the 1978 African Cup of Nations. He played for Rail Club du Kadiogo.
