= Ridha El Louze =

Tunisian footballer

Personal information
- Date of birth: 27 April 1953 (age 73)
- Place of birth: Tunisia
- Position: Defender

Senior career*
Years	Team	Apps	(Gls)
- Sfax Railways Sports

International career
- Tunisia
- * Club domestic league appearances and goals

Ridha El Louze (born 27 April 1953) is a Tunisian football defender who played for Sfax Railways Sports and the Tunisia national team. He was part of the Tunisian squad that participated in the 1978 FIFA World Cup.
