= Naby Camara =

Guinean footballer

Personal information
- Date of birth: 10 May 1996 (age 30)
- Place of birth: Conakry, Guinea
- Height: 1.73 m (5 ft 8 in)
- Position: Right-back

Team information
- Current team: AS Kaloum

Senior career*
Years	Team	Apps	(Gls)
2015–2021	Hafia		
2021	Rukh Brest	2	(0)
2022–	Kaloum		

International career^{‡}
2019–	Guinea	9	(0)
- * Club domestic league appearances and goals as of 31 December 2021 ‡ National team caps and goals as of 28 March 2021

Naby Camara (born 10 May 1996) is a Guinean professional footballer who plays as a right-back for Guinée Championnat National club AS Kaloum and the Guinea national team.

== International career ==
Camara made his debut with the Guinea national team in a 1–0 2020 African Nations Championship qualification loss to Liberia on 21 September 2019.
