= William Byaruhanga =

Ugandan lawyer and businessman

- Born: Uganda
- Citizenship: Uganda
- Education: Makerere University (Bachelor of Laws); Law Development Centre (Diploma in Legal Practice)
- Occupations: Lawyer, businessman
- Years active: 1988–present
- Title: Attorney General of Uganda
- Spouse: Mrs. Jackie Byaruhanga

William Byaruhanga is a Ugandan lawyer and businessman. He served as the Attorney General of Uganda in the Ugandan Cabinet. He was appointed to that position on 6 June 2016, replacing Fred Ruhindi, who was dropped from cabinet. He himself was replaced on June 5, 2021 by Kiryowa Kiwanuka.

== Background and education ==
William Byaruhanga graduated from Makerere University, with a Bachelor of Laws. He then attended the Law Development Centre, graduating with a Diploma in Legal Practice. He was admitted to the Uganda Bar in 1988.

== Career ==
Prior to his current appointment, Byaruhanga was the Principal Partner of Kasirye, Byaruhanga and Company Advocates, a privately owned Kampala law firm. On 6 June 2016, he was appointed Attorney General of Uganda.

== Other responsibilities ==
William Byaruhanga serves on the board of directors of Centum Investments, since October 2016.

== See also ==
- Cabinet of Uganda
- Parliament of Uganda
