= 1992 CAF Cup =

Tournament details
- Dates: 28 November 1992
- Teams: 30 (from 1 confederation)

Final positions
- Champions: (Nigeria) Shooting Stars (1st title)
- Runners-up: (Uganda) Nakivubo Villa

Tournament statistics
- Matches played: 58
- Goals scored: 135 (2.33 per match)

The 1992 CAF Cup was the first football club tournament season that took place for the runners-up of each African country's domestic league. It was won by Shooting Stars in two-legged final victory against Nakivubo Villa.

== First round ==
Team 1	Agg.	Team 2	1st leg	2nd leg
Kaloum Star (Guinea)	4–5	(Gabon) ASMO Libreville	3–0	1–5
ASM Oran (Algeria)	5–2	(Mauritania) ASC Air Mauritanie	4–0	1–2
Al-Wahda (Libya)	3–2	(Sudan) Al-Mourada SC	1–0	2–2
CA Bizertin (Tunisia)	4–1	(Niger) Zumunta AC	3–0	1–1
Diamant Yaoundé (Cameroon)	3–1	(Chad) AS CotonTchad	2–0	1–1
Djoliba AC (Mali)	2–2 (a)	(Burkina Faso) USC Bobo Dioulasso	2–1	0–1
Étoile du Congo (Republic of the Congo)	5–1	(Equatorial Guinea) Deportivo Mongomo	5–0	0–1
SC Gagnoa (Ivory Coast)	3–1	(Central African Republic) AS Petroca	3–0	0–1
Kisumu Postal (Kenya)	4–1	(Tanzania) Small Simba SC	2–1	2–0
Linare FC (Lesotho)	0–4	(Mozambique) Ferroviário de Maputo	0–0	0–4
Mbongo Sport (Zaire)	5–0	(Namibia) African Stars	3–0	2–0
Mufulira Wanderers (Zambia)	w/o	(Angola) Sagrada Esperança	—	—
Nakivubo Villa (Uganda)	5–2	(Eswatini) Moneni Pirates	3–1	2–1
ASEC Ndiambour (Senegal)	0–0 (5–4 p)	(Sierra Leone) East End Lions	0–0	0–0
Real Tamale United (Ghana)	1–1 (5–6 p)	(Benin) Dragons de l'Ouémé	1–0	0–1
Shooting Stars (Nigeria)	bye			

== Second round ==
Team 1	Agg.	Team 2	1st leg	2nd leg
ASM Oran (Algeria)	4–3	(Libya) Al-Wahda	3–0	1–3
Dragons de l'Ouémé (Benin)	0–3	(Gabon) ASMO Libreville	0–0	0–3
Ferroviário de Maputo (Mozambique)	5–5 (5–4 p)	(Angola) Sagrada Esperança	3–2	2–3
SC Gagnoa (Ivory Coast)	3–0	(Republic of the Congo) Étoile du Congo	2–0	1–0
Mbongo Sport (Zaire)	1–1 (a)	(Cameroon) Diamant Yaoundé	0–0	1–1
Nakivubo Villa (Uganda)	2–0	(Kenya) Kisumu Postal	1–0	1–0
ASEC Ndiambour (Senegal)	2–4	(Tunisia) CA Bizertin	1–0	1–4
USC Bobo Dioulasso (Burkina Faso)	1–4	(Nigeria) Shooting Stars	1–1	0–3

== Quarter-finals ==
Team 1	Agg.	Team 2	1st leg	2nd leg
ASM Oran (Algeria)	0–2	(Tunisia) CA Bizertin	0–0	0–2
SC Gagnoa (Ivory Coast)	1–5	(Mozambique) Ferroviário de Maputo	0–2	1–3
Nakivubo Villa (Uganda)	3–2	(Gabon) ASMO Libreville	3–1	0–1
Shooting Stars (Nigeria)	1–1 (3–2 p)	(Zaire) Mbongo Sport	1–0	0–1

== Semi-finals ==
Team 1	Agg.	Team 2	1st leg	2nd leg
CA Bizertin (Tunisia)	2–3	(Nigeria) Shooting Stars	2–0	0–3
Nakivubo Villa (Uganda)	2–2 (4–3 p)	(Mozambique) Ferroviário de Maputo	1–1	1–1

== Final ==
Team 1	Agg.	Team 2	1st leg	2nd leg
Nakivubo Villa (Uganda)	0–3	(Nigeria) Shooting Stars	0–0	0–3

== Winners ==
1992 CAF Cup Winners
(Nigeria)
Shooting Stars
First title
