= Felix Owolabi =

Nigerian footballer

Felix Owolobi
Personal information
- Date of birth: 24 January 1956 (age 70)
- Place of birth: Nigeria
- Height: 1.65 m (5 ft 5 in)
- Position: Midfielder

Senior career*
Years	Team	Apps	(Gls)
	Raccah Rovers of Kano	-	(-)
	IICC Shooting Stars	-	(-)

International career
1978–1982	Nigeria	35	(2)
- * Club domestic league appearances and goals

Felix Owolabi (born 24 November 1956) is a retired Nigerian footballer who played for the Nigerian national team. Playing much of his career as a left winger, he played for Nigeria at the 1978 African Cup of Nations and at the 1980 Summer Olympics. He played with the Nigerian teams that came third at the 1978 African Cup of Nations and won the African Cup of Nations in 1980.

Holder of a doctorate degree in Physical education, Owo-blow as he is fondly called, also played for Kaduna Rocks (of Kaduna), Raccah Rovers of Kano, and the IICC Shooting Stars (of Ibadan). He was with the latter club for 15 years, during which, in 1992, he helped the club win the CAF Cup (now known as the CAF Confederation Cup). Beyond active play for the club he also helped with administration before final disengagement.
