= Kasirye Byaruhanga =

Ugandan law firm

- Headquarters: Plot 33, Clement Hill Road - Off Nile Avenue, Kampala, Uganda
- No. of offices: 1
- No. of attorneys: 18
- No. of employees: 35
- Major practice areas: General Business Law Practice
- Key people: Andrew Kasirye (Managing Partner), William Byaruhanga (Principal Partner) Enock Rukidi (Senior Partner) & Paul Rutisya (Partner)
- Revenue: Unknown
- Date founded: 1991 (Kampala)
- Founder: Andrew Kasirye & William Byaruhanga
- Company type: LLP
- Website: www.lawyer.co.ug

Kasirye Byaruhanga & Co Advocates (KB &Co.) is a Ugandan law firm headquartered in Kampala, the capital city of Uganda. It is a business law firm that was founded in 1991 by Andrew Kasirye and William Byaruhanga. The firm is part of Mackrell International, a global law firm network, and is active in litigation, with a substantial part of its practice also dedicated to transactional matters and retainer clients. The firm's advocates are members of various professional bodies, including the International Bar Association, the East African Law Society and the Uganda Law Society.

KB & Co advises leading local and multinational organisations that include among others Excel Construction, Umeme, Association of Uganda Oil & Gas Service Providers, Stanbic Bank, Barclays Bank, Kakira Sugar Works, Madhvani Group, UAP Insurance Uganda Limited, Fastjet and National Social Security Fund. The firm’s most active disciplines are ADR, arbitration, litigation, company and commercial as well as public and administrative. Its key sectors are oil and gas, power, airports and aviation plus industry and manufacturing. The firm also acts for industry regulators, international financiers, the Government and governmental agencies. International law firms also regularly engage the group to act as local counsel when they require Ugandan expertise.

== History ==
Kasirye Byaruhanga & Co was established in 1991 by two partners, Andrew Kasirye and William Byaruhanga. As of 2014, the firm consists of four partners and 14 associates and is also part of the Mackrell International network of independent law firms.

== Work Profile ==
Kasirye Byaruhanga specializes in the following legal disciplines: Acquisitions, Mergers and Divestitures, Banking and Finance, Commercial Real Estate, Competition and Anti Trust, Corporate Commercial Transactions, Corporate Restructuring and Insolvency, Equipment Leasing, International Trade, Labour, Employment and Immigration, Litigation and Dispute Resolution, Mining and Natural Resources, Non-profit Organisations, Probate and Administration of Estates, Public Private Partnerships and Joint Ventures, Tax and Wealth Management.

Notable transactions include:

- The firm was retained by Umeme to provide legal advice during a review of its electricity supply agreements by the Electricity Regulatory Authority. The advice covered the company's concession agreements with the government and negotiations with the Authority.
- The firm also advised the Association of Uganda Oil and Gas Service providers (AUOGS), namely in regard to pushing local content provisions in oil and gas legislation.
- Andrew Kasirye led a team to advise Eko Power on the construction of a 20MW mini-hydropower dam and VS Hydro on a similar project on the River Mpanga.

Notable cases include:

- Successfully acted for the National Social Security Fund (NSSF), Uganda's statutory provident fund, in a case in which a city advocate had handed NSSF a whooping Shs30 billion bill for legal services he rendered for a case that had spanned more than a decade.
- Acted for Umeme in a case in which Umeme sued Uganda's Electricity Regulatory Authority (ERA) over new terms. Umeme argued that it was never given ample opportunity to appeal before ERA made modifications that targeted its critical areas of business.

== Associate firms ==
- Mackrell International

== Awards & Rankings ==
- KB & Co is ranked among financial and corporate law firms in the 2014 edition of IFLR1000: The Guide to the World's Leading Financial Law Firms. The firm is also ranked as an energy and infrastructure law firm by the same legal directory.
- Kasirye Byaruhanga is a ranked law firm in the 2014 edition of Chambers Global a publication of CHAMBERS & PARTNERS: Your guide to the world's best lawyers.

== See also ==
- Byaruhanga
- Law Development Centre
- Uganda Law Society
