= OC Mbongo Sport =

- Full name: Olympic Club Mbongo Sport
- Ground: Stade Tshikisha, Mbujimayi, DR Congo
- Capacity: 8,000

Olympic Club Mbongo Sport is a football club in Mbuji-Mayi, Democratic Republic of Congo. In the 2006/2007 season they played in the Linafoot, the top level of professional football in DR Congo.

== Honours ==
Coupe de l'Indépendance

- Runners-up (1): 1995

== Performance in CAF competitions ==
- CAF Cup: 1 appearance

1992 – Quarter-Final
