= Adolf Armah =

Ghanaian footballer

Personal information
- Position: Defender

Senior career*
Years	Team	Apps	(Gls)
1975–1983	Accra Hearts of Oak		

International career
1975–1980	Ghana		

Managerial career
- Accra Hearts of Oak (assistant)
- * Club domestic league appearances and goals

Adolf Armah is a Ghanaian former professional footballer who played as a defender. He is known for his involvement in the squad that won the 1978 African Cup of Nations.

== Club career ==
Armah played for Accra Hearts of Oak from the 1975 to 1983 season. In 1979, he was named as the second best African Footballer of the Year with Cameroonian player Thomas N´kono beating him the ultimate. During his playing days he was given the nickname as Rolandanster or Midfield Marshall, due to his midfield prowess and his ability to control the midfield during a match. He later played for other clubs in Egypt, Ivory Coast, Gabon and the United Arab Emirates (UAE).

== International career ==
Armah played in both the and 1978, 1980 African Cup of Nations helping Ghana lift the cup in 1978 after beating Uganda 2–0 to make Ghana the first ever country to win the African Cup of Nations three times. The Ghana team gained popularity after they were dubbed 'the Brazil of Africa' due to winning the AFCON similar to Brazil in 1970 as they won the World Cup for their third time. Coincidentally, the Ghanaian squad had their training tour in Brazil before the AFCON tournament.

Armah captained the Black Stars between 1981 and 1982, and he led the team to qualify to 1982 African Cup of Nations, but was not part of the team that won the cup.

== Coaching career ==
After retiring, Armah returned to Accra Hearts of Oak to serve as a member of their technical team and an assistant coach in the early 2000s including under Ernst Middendorp and Cecil Jones Attuquayefio. He served as an assistant coach alongside Emmanuel Ofei Ansah in 2004.

He was the head coach of African Stars in 2003.

== Honours ==
Hearts of Oak

- Ghana Premier League: 1976, 1978, 1979
- Ghanaian FA Cup: 1979, 1981

Ghana

- African Cup of Nations: 1978

Individual

- African Player of the Year second place: 1979
