= Racca Rovers F.C. =

Nigerian football club

Racca Rovers (also spelled Raccah Rovers) was a Nigerian football team that played in Kano. It used to be known as Darma United before it was taken over by the famous Kano based businessman, Mr. Rex Raccah. They won the Nigerian Premier League championship in 1978, the second northern team to do so and the last one until 1994. They reached the quarter finals of the 1979 African Cup of Champions Clubs and reached the finals of the Nigerian Federation Cup. Some of the legends of the club are Baba Otu Mohammed, Ayiye Mohammed, Kalala Mohammed, Shefiu Mohammed, Annas Ahmed, Idris Musa (Gideon), Walter Ossai, Grandson Abbas, Ahmed Garba (Dangoggo), Chizo, Abubakar, Iliyasu Yashin, Alhaji Kabiru (Chang Hoo), Hussaini Alabi.

Their most famous game was a 2–1 loss to Brazilian club Fluminense FC, in a friendly played in Kaduna on 26 April 1978. The game featured Pelé, who played 45 minutes for Fluminense. During the half time break, Pelé was decorated with the traditional attire of Babban riga and Zannah cap by the then governor of Plateau State, Air Commodore Dan Suleiman.

== Achievements ==
- Nigeria Premier League: 1

1978

== Performance in CAF competitions ==
- African Cup of Champions Clubs: 1 appearance

1979: Quarter-Finals
