= Joel N. Blankson =

American medical academic

- Education: Cornell University Medical School, Rockefeller University
- Occupation: Professor at Johns Hopkins School of Medicine

Joel N. Blankson is a professor at the Johns Hopkins School of Medicine in the Department of Medicine, Division of Infectious Diseases. Blankson is an expert on HIV infection, particularly HIV latency and long-term control of HIV infection. He is a lead investigator in studies on these topics and is frequently interviewed in the scientific and popular press. Blankson also practices internal and infectious diseases medicine in Lutherville, Maryland.

== Training and career ==
In 1995, Blankson received an MD he earned at the Cornell University Medical School, now known as Weil Cornell, in New York City, New York. His PhD was awarded by Rockefeller University in 1996 as part of a joint MD-PhD program with Cornell and Memorial Sloan-Kettering. At Rockefeller, Blankson conducted immunology research with Stephen S. Morse.

Blankson completed residencies in infectious diseases and internal medicine at Johns Hopkins. He has practiced medicine in Delaware and Maryland. He is currently a professor in the Johns Hopkins Department of Internal Medicine, Division of Infectious Diseases, and has an appointment in the Department of Molecular and Comparative Pathobiology.

== Research ==
After his PhD research on immunology and residencies at Johns Hopkins, Blankson investigated HIV at Johns Hopkins with Robert Siliciano. Their work together has included research on HIV pathogenesis, immune reconstitution, control of viremia, and HIV viral reservoirs. They also reviewed the concept of "structured therapeutic interruption."

More recently, Blankson has led investigations of elite suppressors of HIV-1 infection. Elite suppressors are people who are infected with HIV-1 but naturally suppress the amount of virus in their blood to very low, almost undetectable levels without use of antiretroviral drugs. Only 1 HIV-positive person out of approximately 300 is in this category. Blankson and other investigators suggest the biological mechanisms of this rare phenomenon may hold the key to new treatments for HIV. As of 2019, Blankson had published more than 50 scientific articles related to elite suppressors, and he has been interviewed extensively in the popular and scientific press.
