= John Nketia Yawson =

Ghanaian footballer

John Nketia Yawson is a Ghanaian former professional footballer who played as a midfielder. He is known for his involvement in the squad that won the 1978 African Cup of Nations and becoming the first African Player to play in the Copa Libertadores.

== Club career ==
He played for Sekondi Eleven Wise in 1977 and 1978 before playing moving to Accra Hearts of Oak for the 1978/79 season. In 1981 he moved to the uruguayan Liga Profesional de Primera División team Club Atlético Peñarol in which his first season led to him becoming the first African player in the Copa Libertadores. Yawson played for Peñarol for two seasons.

== International career ==
Yawson played in both the 1980 and 1978 African Cup of Nations, helping Ghana lift the cup in 1978 after beating Uganda 2–0 to make Ghana the first ever country to win the African Cup of Nations three times. The Ghana team gained popularity after they were dubbed ‘the Brazil of Africa’ due to winning the AFCON similar to Brazil in 1970 as they won the World Cup for their third time. Coincidentally, the Ghanaian squad had their training tour in Brazil before the AFCON tournament.

His strong performance in midfield led to him being awarded Ghana Player of the Year in 1979.
