= Jamil Kasirye =

Ugandan footballer (born 1954)

Personal information
- Date of birth: 1954 (age 71–72)
- Place of birth: Kasubi, Uganda
- Position: Goalkeeper

Senior career*
Years	Team	Apps	(Gls)
1974–1977	Lint FC	-	(-)
1977–1980	KCC	-	(-)
1980–1985	Villa	-	(-)
1986	Bank of Uganda	-	(-)

International career
1978–1984	Uganda	1	(0)
- * Club domestic league appearances and goals

Jamil Kasirye (born 1954) is a retired football goalkeeper who played for Uganda in the 1978 African Cup of Nations.

== Career ==
Born in Kasubi (a suburb of Kampala), Kasirye played club football for Lint FC, Kampala City Council FC, SC Villa and Bank of Uganda FC. He won two Ugandan Premier League titles with Villa, won the Ugandan Cup three times (twice with KCC and once with Villa), and captained the Villa side that reached the quarter-finals of the 1983 African Cup of Champions Clubs.

Kasirye made several appearances for the Uganda youth and senior national teams. His last match was a 0–3 defeat by Zambia in July 1984.
