= James Kuuku Dadzie =

Ghanaian footballer

Personal information
- Full name: James Kuuku Dadzie
- Place of birth: Ghana
- Position: Defender

Senior career*
Years	Team	Apps	(Gls)
1976–1981	Sekondi Hasaacas		

International career
1978–1980	Ghana		
Medal record
Representing Ghana
Men's football
Africa Cup of Nations
Winner	1978 Ghana
- * Club domestic league appearances and goals

James Kuuku Dadzie is a Ghanaian former professional footballer and manager who currently serves as head coach for Ebusua Dwarfs. During his playing career he played as a defender for Sekondi Hasaacas F.C. At the international level, he is known for his involvement in the squad that won the 1978 African Cup of Nations. He served as the head coach of the Ghana women's national under-20 football team and also later as the head coach for the senior women's team. As coach of the U20, he guided them to Ghana's first women's U20 World Cup in 2010, and also led them to a second-place finish during the 2011 All-Africa Games.

== International career ==
Dadzie played for the Ghana national team in the 1970s and early 1980s. He was key member of the squad that played in both the and 1978, 1980 African Cup of Nations helping Ghana to make history as the first country to win the competition three times and for keeps during the 1978 edition, after scoring Uganda 2–0 in the finals. At a point in time, he served as the captain of the side.

He regards himself as being the best ever centre-back to have played for the national team.

== Coaching career ==
After retiring from playing football, Dadzie went into coaching. He served as the assistant coach to E. K. Afranie in the 1990s. He also served as the assistant coach for the Ghana national under-17 football team under Cecil Jones Attuquayefio in the 1990s including serving under him during the 1999 FIFA U-17 World Championship when Ghana placed third.

=== Ghana Women U20 ===
In November 2009, he was appointed as the head coach of the Ghana women's national under-20 football team (the Black Princesses). He coached the side to win the 2010 African U-20 Cup of Nations for Women, joint with Nigeria, to qualify them to the 2010 FIFA U-20 Women's World Cup for the first time in the country's history. The team put up an impressive showdown by drawing and picking up a point against United States, losing to South Korea by 4–2 and winning against Switzerland to pick up the countries first win at the FIFA U-20 Women's World Cup. However the four points they managed to pick was not enough to send them to the quarter-finals. Upon their return from the world cup, his team, the U20 side were charged to serve as Ghana's team for the qualifiers for the 2011 All-African Games. The team beat Liberia 11–0 on aggregate in the preliminary round and women's powerhouse Nigeria on 3–2 on aggregate in the final round to qualify for the 2011 All-Africa Games – Women's tournament. During the competition, he led the team to the finals, with an unbeaten record before losing to Cameroon in the final by a lone goal.

=== Ghana Women ===
After serving as head coach of the U20 side for three years, he was elevated to the role of head coach for the senior women's side, the Black Queens in October 2011. After failing to replicate similar successes chalked during his time as head coach of the U20 side including failing to qualify for the 2012 African Women's Championship – (the team lost out to Cameroon on penalties during the final round of the qualifying stage), he was replaced by his assistant Yusif Basigi in 2013.

=== Ebusua Dwarfs ===
On 15 June 2021, Dadzie was appointed as the head coach of Ebusua Dwarfs with five games to the end of the 2020–21 Ghana Premier League season after Ernest Thompson-Quartey resigned from the role. He led the team to three wins, one draw and one loss picking 10 points out of a possible 15 including defeating Bechem United by 2–1 on the final day of the season, however, the team was relegated on a head-to-head disadvantage against Elmina Sharks and King Faisal Babes.

== Honours ==
=== Player ===
Sekondi Hasaacas

- Ghana Premier League: 1977

Ghana

- Africa Cup of Nations: 1978

Individual

- Africa Cup of Nations Team of the Tournament: 1978

=== Manager ===
Ghana Women's U20

- All-Africa Games silver medal: 2011

== See also ==
- 1978 Africa Cup of Nations
- Evans Adotey
