= 1976 African Cup Winners' Cup =

Tournament details
- Dates: April - 12 December 1976
- Teams: 20 (from 1 confederation)

Final positions
- Champions: (Nigeria) Shooting Stars F.C. (1st title)
- Runners-up: (Cameroon) Tonnerre Yaoundé

Tournament statistics
- Matches played: 38
- Goals scored: 128 (3.37 per match)

The 1976 African Cup Winners' Cup was the second edition of Africa's secondary interclub competition. The tournament was played by 20 teams and used a knock-out format with ties played home and away. Shooting Stars F.C. from Nigeria won the final, and claimed their - and their country's - first African club trophy.

== Preliminary round ==
Team 1	Agg.	Team 2	1st leg	2nd leg
Bata Bullets (Malawi)	6-4	(Madagascar) Fortior Mahajanga	2-4	4-0
Canon Yaoundé (Cameroon)	6-1	(Gabon) Petrosport	3-0	3-1
Liberté FC (Niger)	1-9	(Libya) Al-Ahly Tripoli	0-5	1-4
Gambia Ports Authority F.C. (The Gambia)	2-6	(Republic of Upper Volta) Rail Club du Kadiogo	1-4	1-2

== First round ==
Team 1	Agg.	Team 2	1st leg	2nd leg
Bata Bullets (Malawi)	1-4	(Zambia) Rokana United	1-0	0-4
Canon Yaoundé (Cameroon)	2-2 (a)	(Zaire) AS Vita Club	2-1	0-1
Rail Club du Kadiogo (Republic of Upper Volta)	1-7	(Guinea) AS Kaloum Star	1-0	0-7
ASKO Kara (Togo)	1-5	(Cameroon) Tonnerre Yaoundé	1-2	0-3
Mechal Army (Ethiopia)	6-4	(Tanzania) Youth League	5-2	1-2
Shooting Stars F.C. (Nigeria)	5-0	Kenya Breweries	3-0	2-0
US Gorée (Senegal)	3-6	(Ivory Coast) Stella Club d'Adjamé	0-0	0-2
Zamalek (Egypt)	4-2	(Libya) Al-Ahly Tripoli	3-0	1-2

== Quarterfinals ==
Team 1	Agg.	Team 2	1st leg	2nd leg
Mechal Army (Ethiopia)	2-6	(Egypt) Zamalek	2-0	0-6
Shooting Stars F.C. (Nigeria)	4-3	(Zambia) Rokana United	3-2	1-1
Tonnerre Yaoundé (Cameroon)	2-1	(Guinea) AS Kaloum Star	0-0	2-1
AS Vita Club (Zaire)	5-3	(Ivory Coast) Stella Club d'Adjamé	2-0	3-3

== Semifinals ==
Team 1	Agg.	Team 2	1st leg	2nd leg
AS Vita Club (Zaire)	2-4	(Cameroon) Tonnerre Yaoundé	1-1	1-3
Zamalek (Egypt)	2-2 (3-5 p)	(Nigeria) Shooting Stars F.C.	2-0	0-2

== Final ==
Team 1	Agg.	Team 2	1st leg	2nd leg
Shooting Stars F.C. (Nigeria)	4-2	(Cameroon) Tonnerre Yaoundé	4-1	0-1

== Champion ==
African Cup Winners' Cup
1976 Winners

Shooting Stars F.C.
First Title
