= Awuley Quaye =

Ghanaian footballer (died 2024)

Personal information
- Full name: Emanuel Awuley Quaye
- Date of death: 25 March 2024
- Position: Defender

Senior career*
Years	Team	Apps	(Gls)
- Accra Great Olympics

International career
- Ghana
- * Club domestic league appearances and goals

Emanuel Awuley Quaye (died 25 March 2024), known as Awulley Senior Quaye, was a Ghanaian international footballer. He captained the Ghana team as they won the 1978 African Cup of Nations. He played club football as a defender for Accra Great Olympics. Awuley was the father of Abdullah Quaye and Lawrence Quaye. He died on 25 March 2024.
