= Anas Seidu =

Ghanaian association football player

Personal information
- Full name: Anas Seidu Tonda
- Date of birth: 1952
- Place of birth: Accra New Town, Gold Coast
- Date of death: 1 July 2023 (aged 70–71)
- Place of death: Accra New Town, Ghana
- Position: Left winger

Youth career
- Seekers

Senior career*
| Years | Team | Apps | (Gls) |
| 1973–1984 | Hearts of Oak | | |

International career
| 1973 | Ghana U23 | | |
| 1978 | Ghana | 2+ | (0+) |
- * Club domestic league appearances and goals

Anas Seidu Tonda (1952 – 1 July 2023) was a Ghanaian footballer who played as a left winger.

== Career ==
Seidu started his career at Seekers in Nima, Accra, with his teammates including Mohammed Polo, Ibrahim Labaran, and Yakubu Ahmed. Later on, he would join Hearts of Oak, where he became part of the "fearsome five" alongside Polo, Robert Hammond, Mama Acquah and Peter Lamptey.

He played for the Ghana national team, and was part of the 1978 African Cup of Nations team that beat Uganda in the final.

During his career, Seidu was nicknamed "Thunder".

== Death ==
Seidu died on 1 July 2023, at his home in Accra New Town. Following his death, FIFA president Gianni Infantino released a statement giving his condolences.
