= Bakana =

- Interactive map of Bakana
- Coordinates: 4°44′17″N 6°57′34″E
- Country: Nigeria
- Time zone: UTC+1 (WAT)

Bakana is a town in Nigeria. It is one of the largest towns of the kalabari people, located in the Degema LGA of Rivers State.
