= Kuntu Blankson =

Ghanaian Actor

- Born: 1955
- Died: 12 July 2018 (aged 62–63); Cape Coast, Ghana
- Citizenship: Ghanaian
- Occupation: Actor
- Known for: Akan Drama
- Children: 3

Kuntu Blankson (1955–2018) was a Ghanaian actor who was very popular for the roles he played on a popular Ghanaian TV series known as Akan Drama in the late 1990s.

== Filmography ==
- Akan Drama
