= Mohammed Polo =

Ghanaian footballer

Personal information
- Full name: Alhaji Mohammed Ahmed
- Date of birth: 11 November 1956 (age 69)
- Place of birth: Accra, Ghana
- Position: Forward

Senior career*
Years	Team	Apps	(Gls)
1972–1973	Auroras FC		
1973–1979	Hearts of Oak	232	(145)
1979–1984	Al-Wasl		
1985–1987	Hearts of Oak		
1987–1988	FC 105 Libreville		
1988–1989	Shell FC		
1989–1992	Hearts of Oak		
1992–1994	Great Olympics		

International career
1973–1985	Ghana	54	(20)

Managerial career
- 1994–1995: Hearts of Oak
- 2003: Stade Malien
- 2004: Great Olympics
- 2013–2014: Hearts of Oak
- * Club domestic league appearances and goals

Alhaji Mohammed Ahmed (born 11 November 1956), popularly known as Mohammed Polo and the "Dribbling Magician", is a former Ghanaian international and local club football player. He is considered one of the best dribblers and Ghanaian players of his generation.

He spent years of his football career playing as a left winger for Hearts of Oak in the Ghana Premier League in the 1970s and 1980s, and was also a key player in the Ghana squad that won the 1978 African Cup of Nations held in Ghana.

== Playing career ==
=== Club career ===
==== Early beginnings in the 70s ====
Polo played football with teams in Accra such as Auroras, Accra Great Olympics and for Hearts of Oak, where along with Mama Acquah, Anas Seidu, Peter Lamptey and Robert Hammond were known as the “Fearsome Five”.

==== Late 70s and 80s at Al Wasl ====
From 1979 to 1984, Mohammad Polo played for the famous Dubai club, Al Wasl, where he was popular with the fans.

==== Later career ====
In 1985 Polo returned to the league of Ghana for Hearts of Oak where he stayed for 2 seasons. He returned to Hearts of Oak in 1989 for another 3-year spell with the club. In 1992 he signed again for Accra Great Olympics ending his career in 1994, aged 38, to move into coaching.

=== International career ===
He was first called-up to play for the Black Stars at age 17. In the 1978 African Cup of Nations where Ghana won its third AFCON title, Polo scored a goal and was listed as a forward in the CAF Team of the Tournament along 3 other Ghanaian players.
He played 54 times scoring 20 goals for Ghana national team from 1973 until 1985.

== Post-playing career ==
He was appointed head coach of Ghana Premier League club Accra Hearts of Oak in 1994 and then in 2013 for seven months. In 2004, Polo was appointed the technical head of the Ghanaian football club Accra Great Olympics. Mohammed Polo owns the soccer academy Golden Stars Academy, which trained at Legon, however has now been renamed Polo Soccer Academy.

== Legacy ==
In 2020, as a speculation regarding Ghana's greatest player of all time had emerged, Polo claimed to be Ghana's best footballer ever following a statement by Osei Kofi who said the same about himself. Polo's statement was also back by Abedi Pele, Kwabena Yeboah and Kwabena Agyapong. On 9 September 2021, Ghanaian-born singer and political activist Kwame Asare Obeng (a.k.a. A Plus) stated that Polo is the third greatest player in history, only behind Pelé and Diego Maradona praising his dribbling abilities.

== Honours ==
Polo has won the following honours

Award by	Honour
1978 African Cup of Nations	Champions
1978 African Cup of Nations	Team of the tournament
Ghana Football Association (1975)	Footballer of the year
France Football Magazine – African Player of the Year (1977)	4th place
UAE League 1981–82, 1982–83	Champions
Coca-Cola Award on Breaking Barriers (2006)	Awarded
