= Joe Carr (Ghanaian footballer) =

Ghanaian footballer

Personal information
- Full name: Joseph Carr
- Place of birth: Ghana
- Position: Goalkeeper

International career
Years	Team	Apps	(Gls)
1978–1984	Ghana		
Medal record
Representing Ghana
Men's football
Africa Cup of Nations
Winner	1982 Libya
Winner	1978 Ghana

Joseph Carr is a former Ghanaian international goalkeeper. He was named in four Africa Cup of Nations during his career.

He was employed by Real Sociedad as a goalkeeper coach when his playing career was over.
