= Shooting Stars S.C. =

Nigerian football club

Shooting Stars SC
- Full name: Shooting Stars Sports Club (3SC)
- Nickname: Oluyole Warriors
- Founded: 1950s (As WNDC Ibadan)
- Ground: Lekan Salami Stadium
- Capacity: 10,000
- Sporting Director: Tobi Adepoju
- Chairman: Hon. Taiwo Lekan Salami
- Manager: Salisu Yusuf
- League: Nigeria Professional Football League
- 2025–26: 3rd
Home colours	Away colours

Shooting Stars Sports Club (often nicknamed 3SC or Oluyole Warriors) is a Nigerian professional football club based in Ibadan, in south-western Nigeria.

== History ==
The club was one of the founders of the Nigerian Premier League in 1972, when they were called WNDC Ibadan (Western Nigeria Development Corporation), and were later called IICC (Industrial Investment and Credit Corporation) Shooting Stars of Ibadan.

Their nickname "Shooting Stars" was added on the suggestion of the team's founding members, the late Jide Johnson and Niyi Omowon the "Aare Odan Liberty" (Generalissimo of Liberty Stadium) who believed that the players were "stars" in their own right.

Shooting Stars is one of the most followed football clubs in Nigeria. They play their home matches at the Lekan Salami Stadium. The stadium was named after one of the prominent supporters of the club who is now deceased. "Sooting", as it is called by its supporters, earlier used to play at the famous Liberty Stadium, one of the venues for the 1999 FIFA World Youth Championship.

Shooting Stars is the first club to win the FA Cup on club basis in Nigeria in 1971, when players like Aderoju Omowon, Niyi Akande, Jossy Lad, Amusa Adisa were prominent in the squad. Shooting Stars is one of the most decorated club sides in Nigeria alongside Enyimba Enugu Rangers and the defunct Stationery Stores of Lagos though they have failed to win any major trophy since 1998. In fact, Shooting Stars and Enugu Rangers are known as the traditional football clubs in the country, both dominating the football scene in the country during the 1970s and 1980s.

Shooting Stars have played and won many matches against top club sides in Africa. 3SC won the first edition of CAF Cup, defeating the Nakivubo Villa of Uganda 3–0 in the finals at the Lekan Salami stadium after the first leg ended goalless. They won the African Cup Winners' Cup in 1976, becoming the first Nigerian clubside to win an international trophy.

They ended their 2004–05 season in fifth place in the Premier League. After the introduction of a strange double-league format by the Nigerian Football Association, Shooting Stars got relegated to the lower division in 2006, but won promotion in 2009 after finishing second in the Division 1B. They were relegated back on the last day of the 2017 NPFL season. Head Coach Edith Agoye and the rest of the 3SC Management board resigned in July 2019 after they lost a promotion playoff to Akwa Starlets.

Many well-known international stars have played for Shooting Stars in the past, including former African footballer of the year Rashidi Yekini, "the mathematical" Segun Odegbami and so on. Notable players include Rashidi Yekini, Segun Odegbami, Felix Owolabi, Niyi Akande, Taiwo Ogunjobi, Duke Udi, Olumide Harris, Golden Ajeboh, Ajibade Babalade, Ademola Johnson, and Jude Axelsson.

== Return to continental football (2025–26) ==
Shooting Stars ended a 27 years absence from continental football, after needing help from Rangers International on the last day when Rangers Int'l defeated Ikorodu city who were also poised to secure a continental slot with only a draw but lost by 1-2 to Rangers who emerged as league champions for the 2025-26 Nigeria Premier League football season. The result meant that despite Shooting Stars loss to Niger Tornadoes on the last day, they still managed to secure a return to the continent since 1999

== Crest ==
Old logo

Present logo

== Honours ==
=== Domestic ===
- Nigerian Premier League
  - Winners (5): 1976, 1980, 1983, 1995, 1998
- Nigerian FA Cup
  - Winners (8): 1959, 1961, 1966, 1969, 1971 (as WNDC), 1977, 1979, 1995

=== Continental ===
- African Cup of Champions Clubs
  - Runners-up (2): 1984, 1996
- CAF Cup
  - Winners (1): 1992
- African Cup Winners' Cup
  - Winners (1): 1976

=== Regional ===
- West African Club Championship
  - Winners (1): 1998

== Performance in CAF competitions ==
- African Cup of Champions Clubs/CAF Champions League: 5 appearances

1972 – Second Round
1981 – Second Round
1984 – Runners-up
1996 – Runners-up
1999 – Group stage (top 8)

- CAF Cup: 3 appearances

1992 – Champion
1993 – First Round
1995 – Second Round

- CAF Cup Winners' Cup: 4 appearances

1976 – Champion
1977 – Semi-finals
1978 – First Round
1980 – Quarter-finals

== Current Squad ==
As of 4 May, 2026

Note: Flags indicate national team as defined under FIFA eligibility rules; some limited exceptions apply. Players may hold more than one non-FIFA nationality.

No.	Pos.	Nation	Player
16	GK	NGR	Mustapha Lawal
33	GK	NGR	Elkanah Godgift
34	GK	NGR	Ozovehe Emmanuel Adeiza
40	GK	NGR	Christian Dawariomi
7	DF	NGR	Edoho Friday Mfon
21	DF	NGR	Monsoor Saleh Aliyu
7	DF	NGR	Desmond Ojietefian Sylvester
8	DF	NGR	Utin Ikouwem Udo
8	DF	NGR	Al-Ameen Tijani Kehinde
9	DF	NGR	Okon Samuel Godwin
11	DF	NGR	Ismail Ghali Falke (captain)
13	DF	NGR	Adelowo Gbolagade Damilola
14	DF	NGR	Justice Apaingolo Mathew
15	DF	NGR	Jamiu Hamzat Opeyemi
16	DF	NGR	Emmanuel Ndubueze Chinedu
17	DF	NGR	David Luis Johnson
18	MF	NGR	Charles Ribannu

No.	Pos.	Nation	Player
19	MF	NGR	Kalio Tamuno
20	MF	NGR	Chukwudi Ekeocha Lawrence
22	MF	NGR	Stephen Amos
23	MF	NGR	Abayomi Adebayo Emmanuel
25	MF	NGR	Tunde Azeez Akeem
26	MF	NGR	Alex Aghahowa Otakho
27	MF	NGR	Tijani Kabiru Manchy
29	MF	NGR	Olajobi Olaoke Oladiran
30	MF	NGR	James Namapele
33	FW	NGR	Mustapha Adam Agba
34	FW	NGR	Wasiu Ganiyu
35	FW	NGR	Akpan Joshua Akan
36	FW	NGR	Qamar Adegoke
38	FW	NGR	Lucky Gyang Emmanuel
38	FW	NGR	Onyemaechi Austin Tochukwu
38	FW	NGR	Ismael Ayodele Ayanda
38	FW	NGR	Alade Muyiwa Balogun
38	FW	NGR	Ibrahim Sodiq Tunde
38	FW	NGR	Promise Awonsanmi Abiodun
38	FW	NGR	TimiTimi Ineikade Nelson
38	FW	NGR	Ohiobe Emmanuel Matthew

== Technical Staff ==
Name	Position
Salisu Yusuf	Technical Adviser
Bashiru Muhammad Saidu	Chief Coach
Ali Kandil	Technical Consultant
Shakiru Lawal	Asst. Head Coach
Adedeji Ayeoba Gabriel	Asst. Head Coach/U-19 Coach
Gopar Cornelius	Goalkeeper Trainer
Kolawole Ige	Goalkeeper Trainer
Lawrence Adedeji	Assistant Coach
Waheed Omololu	Asst. Coach
Abdulsalam Habeeb	Psychologist
Jesse Afuye	Match and Performance Analyst

== Notable coaches ==
- (England) Alan Hawkes
- Franklin Howard
- Akintola Idowu
- Yusuf Lati
- Festus Onigbinde
- Tayo Oloniyo
- Siegfried Bahner
- Jossy Ladipo
- Fatai Amoo
- Edith Olumide Agoye
- Niyi Akande

== Notable players ==
- (Nigeria) Segun Odegbami
- (Nigeria) Duke Udi
- (Nigeria) Junior Ajayi
- (Nigeria) Abiodun Baruwa
- (Nigeria) Mutiu Adepoju
- (Nigeria) Mudashiru Lawal
- (Nigeria) Ajibade Babalade
- (Nigeria) Felix Owolabi
- (Nigeria) Rashidi Yekini
- (Nigeria) Idowu Otubusen (Slow Poison)
- (Nigeria) Alao Dabani Godwin
- (Nigeria) Adewale Yusuff Alani
- (Nigeria) Opeoluwa Olufemi
- (Nigeria) Ebuka Anaekwe
- (Nigeria) Omar Rekik
- (Nigeria) Best Ogedegbe
