= Robert Hammond (footballer) =

Ghanaian footballer

Personal information
- Date of birth: 5 May 1950
- Place of birth: Ghana
- Date of death: 30 May 2017 (aged 67)
- Place of death: United States
- Position: Midfielder

Senior career*
Years	Team	Apps	(Gls)
1967	Great Olympics		
1968–1985	Hearts of Oak		

International career
1975–1977	Ghana	2	(0)
- * Club domestic league appearances and goals

Robert Hammond (5 May 1950 – 30 May 2017) was a Ghanaian footballer.

== International career ==
Hammond played in the 1976 Summer Olympics qualification tournament. The Ghana team qualified but later withdrew in protest of the New Zealand national rugby union team tour of apartheid South Africa.

He played in the 1978 FIFA World Cup qualification campaign for Ghana against Guinea.

== Career statistics ==
=== International ===
Appearances and goals by national team and year
National team	Year	Apps	Goals
Ghana	1975	1	0
Ghana	1976	0	0
Ghana	1977	1	0
Total		2	0
