= 1978 African Cup of Nations final =

- Event: 1978 African Cup of Nations
Ghana	Uganda
(Ghana)	(Uganda)
2	0
- Date: 16 March 1978
- Venue: Accra Sports Stadium, Accra
- Referee: Yousef El Ghoul (Libya)
- Attendance: 80,000

The 1978 African Cup of Nations final was a football match that took place on Thursday, 16 March 1978, at the Accra Sports Stadium in Accra, Ghana, to determine the winner of the 1978 Africa Cup of Nations. Ghana defeated Uganda 2–0 with two goals from Opoku Afriyie to win their third African Cup. As of 2019, this is the only Ugandan appearance in an African Cup of Nations final.

== Road to the final ==
Ghana's road to the finals started in group A with national opponent Burkina Faso (then known as Upper Volta), Nigeria and Zambia. Ghana won two of its games against Burkina Faso which ended in a 3-0 and a 2–1 victory over Zambia. The game against Nigeria ended in a draw with Ghana finishing the group as group leaders with 7 points. Ghana meet Tunisia in the semi finals since the tournament was of 8 participants and won the game by a 1–0, a goal scored by Abdul Razak. In the finals, Opoku Afriyie gave Ghana the 2 goals victory over Uganda to be crown as the champions of the competition.

Ghana		Uganda	
Opponents	Results	Opponents	Results
Group stage
Zambia	2–1	Congo	3–1
Nigeria	1–1	Tunisia	1–3
Upper Volta	3–0	Morocco	3–0
Semi-finals
Tunisia	1–0	Nigeria	2–1

== Match ==
=== Details ===
16 March 1978
--:-- UTC+0

Ghana	2–0	Uganda
Afriyie 38', 64'	Report

Accra Sports Stadium, Accra
Attendance: 40,000
Referee: Yousef El Ghoul (Libya)

Ghana	Uganda

GK		Joe Carr
RB		P.S.K. Paha	(substituted off) 70'
CB		Awuley Quaye (c)
CB	3	James Kuuku Dadzie
LB		Isaac Acquaye
CM		John Nketia Yawson
CM		Mohammed Polo
CM		Addae Kyenkyehene
RW	10	Karim Abdul Razak
CF		Opoku Afriyie
LW		Anas Seidu	(substituted off) 71'
Substitutions:
DF		Emmanuel Ofei Ansah	(substituted on) 70'
FW		Dan Kayede	(substituted on) 71'
Manager:
Fred Osam-Duodu

GK	Paul Ssali
RB	Eddie Ssemwanga
CB	Jimmy Kirunda (c)
CB	Sam Musenze
LB	Tom Lwanga
RM	Abdulla Nasur	(substituted off) 55'
CM	Moses Nsereko
CM	Mike Kiganda
LM	Godfrey Kisitu	(substituted off) 52'
CF	Phillip Omondi
CF	Fred Isabirye
Substitutions:
DF	Meddie Lubega	(substituted on) 52'
MF	Barnabas Mwesiga	(substituted on) 55'
Manager:
Peter Okee

Assistant referees:
...
...
