= 1978 FIFA World Cup qualification (CAF) =

Tournament details
- Dates: 7 March 1976 – 11 December 1977
- Teams: 22 (from 1 confederation)

Tournament statistics
- Matches played: 41
- Goals scored: 119 (2.9 per match)
- Attendance: 1,197,425 (29,205 per match)
- Top scorer: (Egypt) Mahmoud El Khatib (6 Goals)

Listed below are the dates and results for the 1978 FIFA World Cup qualification rounds for the African zone (CAF). For an overview of the qualification rounds, see the article 1978 FIFA World Cup qualification.

A total of 26 CAF teams entered the competition. The African Zone was allocated 1 place (out of 16) in the final tournament.

== Format ==
There would be five rounds of play:

- Preliminary Round, First Round, Second Round and Third Round: In each of these rounds, the teams were paired up to play knockout matches on a home-and-away basis. The winners would advance to the next round, until there would be 3 teams left.
- Final Round: The 3 teams would play against each other on a home-and-away basis. The group winner would qualify.

== Preliminary round ==
Team 1	Agg.	Team 2	1st leg	2nd leg
Sierra Leone	6–3	Niger	5–1	1–2
Upper Volta	3–1	Mauritania	1–1	2–0

7 March 1976

Sierra Leone	5–1	Niger
Dumbuya 37', 68'; Sounomu 57', 66'; Tray 70'		Adamou 17'

National Stadium, Freetown, Sierra Leone
Attendance: 4,250
Referee: Aguiahr Komla Barto (Togo)
21 March 1976

Niger	2–1	Sierra Leone
Seydou 36'; Kanfideni 52'		Sango 37'

Stade du 29 Juillet, Niamey, Niger
Attendance: 5,641
Referee: Thompson Shakirudeen Badru (Nigeria)

Sierra Leone won 6–3 on agg. and advanced to the first round.

13 March 1976

Upper Volta	1–1	Mauritania
Kaboré 44'		Coulibaly 68' (pen.)

Stade Municipal, Ouagadougou, Upper Volta
Attendance: 3,323
Referee: Adamou Mamoudou (Niger)
28 March 1976

Mauritania	0–2	Upper Volta
		Zoma 32'; Ouattara 52'

Stade de la Capitale, Nouakchott, Mauritania
Attendance: 1,782
Referee: Mody Ba (Mali)

Upper Volta won 3–1 on agg. and advanced to the first round.

== First round ==
Team 1	Agg.	Team 2	1st leg	2nd leg	3rd leg
Algeria	1–0	Libya	1–0	0–0	
Morocco	2–2 (2–4 p)	Tunisia	1–1	1–1	
Togo	2–1	Senegal	1–0	1–1	
Ghana	3–5	Guinea	2–1	1–2	0–2
Sierra Leone	2–6	Nigeria	0–0	2–6	
Congo-Brazzaville	4–2	Cameroon	2–2	2–0	
Upper Volta	1–3	Ivory Coast	1–1	0–2	
Egypt	5–1	Ethiopia	3–0	2–1	
Zambia	5–0	Malawi	4–0	1–0	
Zaire	w/o	Central African Republic	—	—	
Kenya	w/o	Sudan	—	—	
Uganda	w/o	Tanzania	—	—	

1 April 1976

Algeria	1–0	Libya
Betrouni 83'

5 July Stadium, Algiers, Algeria
Attendance: 15,267
Referee: Jean Dubach (Switzerland)
16 April 1976

Libya	0–0	Algeria

11 June Stadium, Tripoli, Libya
Attendance: 30,000
Referee: Emilio Guruceta Muro (Spain)

Algeria won 1–0 on agg. and advanced to the second round.

12 December 1976

Morocco	1–1	Tunisia
Lakhal 35'		Dhiab 56'

Stade Père Jégo, Casablanca, Morocco
Attendance: 13,056
Referee: Franz Wöhrer (Austria)
9 January 1977

Tunisia	1–1 (a.e.t.)	Morocco
Labidi 34'		Tahir 55'
Penalties
	4–2

Stade El Menzah, Tunis, Tunisia
Attendance: 44,500
Referee: Walter Hungerbühler (Switzerland)

The aggregate score was tied 2–2, but Tunisia won 4–2 on penalties in the second leg to advance to the second round. This was the first penalty shoot-out in a World Cup match.

17 October 1976

Togo	1–0	Senegal
Rachidou 87'

Stade Général Eyadema, Lomé, Togo
Attendance: 5,173
Referee: Dwomoh (Ghana)
31 October 1976

Senegal	1–1	Togo
Ba 63'		Afanou 58'

Stade Demba Diop, Dakar, Senegal
Attendance: 7,000
Referee: Abdelali (Morocco)

Togo won 2–1 on agg. and advanced to the second round.

10 October 1976

Ghana	2–1	Guinea
Kassum 57'; Afriyie 83'		Y. Camara 52'

Accra Sports Stadium, Accra, Ghana
Attendance: 10,000
Referee: Koudou (Ivory Coast)
31 October 1976

Guinea	2–1 (a.e.t.)	Ghana
Papa Camara 51'; Keita 56'		Ansah 59'

Stade du 28 Septembre, Conakry, Guinea
Attendance: 20,000
Referee: Aouissi (Algeria)

The aggregate score was tied 3–3, and a play-off on neutral ground was played to decide who would advance to the second round.

16 January 1977

Ghana	0–2	Guinea
		Papa Camara 3'; S. Sylla 31'

Stade Général Eyadema, Lomé, Togo
Attendance: 13,482
Referee: N'diaye (Senegal)

Guinea advanced to the second round, via the play-off.

16 October 1976

Sierra Leone	0–0	Nigeria

Reckrie Stadium, Freetown, Sierra Leone
Attendance: 5,173
Referee: Turkson (Ghana)
30 October 1976

Nigeria	6–2	Sierra Leone
Odegbami 25'; Atuegbu 31', 34'; Usiyan 40'; Emeteole 63'; Awesu 77'		Dyfan 74'; Sama 88' (pen.)

Surulere Stadium, Lagos, Nigeria
Attendance: 25,996
Referee: Matovu (Tanzania)

Nigeria won 6–2 on agg. and advanced to the second round.

17 October 1976

Congo-Brazzaville	2–2	Cameroon
Mounoudzi 66' (pen.); Wamba 76'		Milla 11'; Onguene 35'

Stade de la Revolution, Brazzaville, Congo-Brazzaville
Attendance: 17,367
Referee: Gumboh (Zambia)
31 October 1976

Cameroon	0–2 Awarded (1–2 82')	Congo-Brazzaville
Milla 7'		Ebomoa 19'; N'Domba 52'

Ahmadou Ahidjo Stadium, Yaoundé, Cameroon
Attendance: 26,050
Referee: Housainou N'Jai (Gambia)

Congo-Brazzaville won 4–2 on agg. and advanced to the second round.

4 September 1976

Upper Volta	1–1	Ivory Coast
Kaboré 70'		Bawa 36'

Stade Municipal, Ouagadougou, Upper Volta
Attendance: 5,418
Referee: N'diaye (Senegal)
26 September 1976

Ivory Coast	2–0	Upper Volta
Kouame 17'; Kouman 34'

Stade Félix Houphouët-Boigny, Abidjan, Côte d'Ivoire
Attendance: 5,960
Referee: Diagne (Guinea)

Côte d'Ivoire won 3–1 on agg. and advanced to the second round.

29 October 1976

Egypt	3–0	Ethiopia
El Khatib 4', 19', 77'

Nasser Stadium, Cairo, Egypt
Attendance: 20,000
Referee: Gianfranco Menegali (Italy)
14 November 1976

Ethiopia	1–2	Egypt
Kassahun 40'		El Khatib 12', 73'

Addis Ababa Stadium, Addis Ababa, Ethiopia
Attendance: 50,000
Referee: Wurtz (France)

Egypt won 5–1 on agg. and advanced to the second round.

9 May 1976

Zambia	4–0	Malawi
Chanda 4'; Phiri 12', 75'; Chamangwana 88' (o.g.)

7 April Stadium, Lusaka, Zambia
Attendance: 16,000
Referee: Muamba Kabwe (Zaire)
30 May 1976

Malawi	0–1	Zambia
		Kapita 48'

Kamuzu Stadium, Blantyre, Malawi
Attendance: 8,230
Referee: Charles Randrianaly (Madagascar)

Zambia won 5–0 on agg. and advanced to the second round.

Zaire	w/o	Central African Republic
		Withdrew

Central African Republic withdrew, so Zaire advanced to the second round automatically.

Kenya	w/o	Sudan
		Withdrew

Sudan withdrew, so Kenya advanced to the second round automatically.

Uganda	w/o	Tanzania
		Withdrew

Tanzania withdrew, so Uganda advanced to the second round automatically.

== Second round ==
Team 1	Agg.	Team 2	1st leg	2nd leg
Tunisia	3–1	Algeria	2–0	1–1
Togo	1–4	Guinea	0–2	1–2
Ivory Coast	6–3	Congo-Brazzaville	3–2	3–1
Kenya	0–1	Egypt	0–0	0–1
Uganda	3–4	Zambia	1–0	2–4 (aet)
Nigeria	w/o	Zaire	—	—

6 February 1977

Tunisia	2–0	Algeria
Akid 56'; Kaabi 73'

Stade El Menzah, Tunis, Tunisia
Attendance: 39,987
Referee: Antoine Queudeville (Luxembourg)
28 February 1977

Algeria	1–1	Tunisia
Guendouz 34'		Jebali 89'

5 July stadium, Algiers, Algeria
Attendance: 80,000
Referee: Paul Bonett (Malta)

Tunisia won 3–1 on agg. and advanced to the third round.

13 February 1977

Togo	0–2	Guinea
		Bangoura 15'; Souleymane 84'

Stade Général Eyadema, Lomé, Togo
Attendance: 7,976
Referee: Felix Balloux (Ivory Coast)
27 February 1977

Guinea	2–1	Togo
Papa Camara 36'; Tollo 40' (pen.)		Ametepé 55'

Stade du 28 Septembre, Conakry, Guinea
Attendance: 11,892
Referee: Tanor Dieng (Senegal)

Guinea won 4–1 on agg. and advanced to the third round.

13 February 1977

Ivory Coast	3–2	Congo-Brazzaville
G'Bize 10'; Mamahou 20'; Kouman 81'		Bahamboula 36'; N'Domba 89'

Municipal Stadium, Bouaké, Ivory Coast
Attendance: 3,600
Referee: Dwomoh (Ghana)
27 February 1977

Congo-Brazzaville	1–3	Ivory Coast
Lingongo 23'		Kouman 10'; Miézan 38'; G'Bize 82'

Stade de la Révolution, Brazzaville, Congo-Brazzaville
Attendance: 70,000
Referee: Festus Okubule (Nigeria)

Ivory Coast won 6–3 on agg. and advanced to the third round.

6 February 1977

Kenya	0–0	Egypt

Nairobi City Stadium, Nairobi, Kenya
Attendance: 8,337
Referee: Ahmed Jama (Somalia)
27 February 1977

Egypt	1–0	Kenya
Khalil 13'

Nasser Stadium, Cairo, Egypt
Attendance: 70,000
Referee: El-Ghoul (Libya)

Egypt won 1–0 on agg. and advanced to the third round.

13 February 1977

Uganda	1–0	Zambia
Ouma 73'

Nakivubo Stadium, Kampala, Uganda
Attendance: 11,940
Referee: Ismael Yusuf Kemal (Ethiopia)
27 February 1977

Zambia	4–2 (a.e.t.)	Uganda
Chola 28'; Chanda 34'; Chitalu 85', 106'		Nasur 14'; Obua 74'

Dag Hammarskjöld Stadium, Ndola, Zambia
Attendance: 20,000
Referee: Gratian Matovu (Tanzania)

Zambia won 4–3 on agg. and advanced to the third round.

Nigeria	w/o	Zaire
		Withdrew

Zaire withdrew, so Nigeria advanced to the third round automatically.

== Third round ==
Team 1	Agg.	Team 2	1st leg	2nd leg
Guinea	2–3	Tunisia	1–0	1–3
Nigeria	6–2	Ivory Coast	4–0	2–2
Egypt	2–0	Zambia	2–0	0–0

5 June 1977

Guinea	1–0	Tunisia
I. Sylla 77'

Stade du 28 Septembre, Conakry, Guinea
Attendance: 25,000
Referee: Mohamed Larache (Morocco)
19 June 1977

Tunisia	3–1	Guinea
Liman 9'; Lahzami 59'; Khouini 62'		A. Sylla 11'

Stade El Menzah, Tunis, Tunisia
Attendance: 35,248
Referee: Hussein Fahmy Bahig (Egypt)

Tunisia won 3–2 on agg. and advanced to the Final Round.

10 July 1977

Nigeria	4–0	Ivory Coast
Usiyan 7', 30'; Iwelumo 18'; Ojebode 56' (pen.)

Surulere Stadium, Lagos, Nigeria
Attendance: 29,815
Referee: Nyirenda Chayu (Zambia)
25 July 1977

Ivory Coast	2–2	Nigeria
Mamahou 37', 58'		Odegbami 74'; Amiesimaka 89'

Municipal Stadium, Bouaké, Ivory Coast
Attendance: 2,040
Referee: Youssou N'Diaye (Senegal)

Nigeria won 6–2 on agg. and advanced to the Final Round.

15 July 1977

Egypt	2–0	Zambia
Gaafar 29'; Hammam 49'

Nasser Stadium, Cairo, Egypt
Attendance: 35,746
Referee: Alberto Michelotti (Italy)
31 July 1977

Zambia	0–0	Egypt

7 April Stadium, Lusaka, Zambia
Attendance: 30,165
Referee: Gordon (Scotland)

Egypt won 2–0 on agg. and advanced to the Final Round.

== Final round ==
Rank	Team	Pts	Pld	W	D	L	GF	GA	GD
1	Tunisia	5	4	2	1	1	7	4	+3
2	Egypt	4	4	2	0	2	7	11	−4
3	Nigeria	3	4	1	1	2	5	4	+1

25 September 1977

Tunisia	0–0	Nigeria

Stade El Menzah, Tunis
Attendance: 38,229
Referee: John Carpenter (Republic of Ireland)

8 October 1977

Nigeria	4–0	Egypt
Chukwu 24'; Odegbami 54', 67'; N'Wadioha 74'

Surulere Stadium, Lagos
Attendance: 25,932
Referee: César da Luz Dias Correia (Portugal)

21 October 1977

Egypt	3–1	Nigeria
Abdou 11', 27'; Mokhtar 50'		Iwelumo 75'

Nasser Stadium, Cairo
Attendance: 90,000
Referee: Emmanuel Platopoulos (Greece)

12 November 1977

Nigeria	0–1	Tunisia
		Odiye 61' (o.g.)

Surulere Stadium, Lagos
Attendance: 80,000
Referee: Ernst Dörflinger (Switzerland)

25 November 1977

Egypt	3–2	Tunisia
Gaafar 26' (pen.); Abdou 53'; El Khatib 83'		Ben Aziza 80'; Akid 87'

Nasser Stadium, Cairo
Attendance: 85,000
Referee: Hilmi Ok (Turkey)

11 December 1977

Tunisia	4–1	Egypt
Akid 15'; Lahzami 42'; Ben Aziza 65'; Labidi 75'		Abdel Baki 80'

Stade El Menzah, Tunis
Attendance: 42,850
Referee: Gianfranco Menegali (Italy)

Tunisia qualified.

== Qualified teams ==
Team	Qualified as	Qualified on	Previous appearances in FIFA World Cup^{1}
Tunisia	Final Round winners	11 December 1977	0 (debut)

^{1} Bold indicates champions for that year. Italic indicates hosts for that year.

== Goalscorers ==
6 goals

- (Egypt) Mahmoud El Khatib

4 goals

- (Nigeria) Segun Odegbami

3 goals

- (Ivory Coast) Kobenan Kouman
- (Ivory Coast) Jérôme Lèbre Mamahou
- (Egypt) Mostafa Abdou
- (Guinea) Papa Camara
- (Nigeria) Thompson Usiyan
- (Tunisia) Mohamed Akid

2 goals

- (Cameroon) Roger Milla
- (Republic of the Congo) Jean-Jacques N'Domba
- (Ivory Coast) Leon Goua G'Bize
- (Egypt) Farouk Gaafar
- (Nigeria) Alloysius Atuegbu
- (Nigeria) Godwin Iwelumo
- (Sierra Leone) Kama Dumbuya
- (Sierra Leone) Wasieu Sounomu
- (Tunisia) Abderraouf Ben Aziza
- (Tunisia) Khemais Labidi
- (Tunisia) Témime Lahzami
- (Republic of Upper Volta) Joseph Kaboré
- (Zambia) Bernard Chanda
- (Zambia) Godfrey Chitalu
- (Zambia) Willie Phiri

1 goal

- (Algeria) Omar Betrouni
- (Algeria) Mahmoud Guendouz
- (Cameroon) Jean Manga Onguéné
- (Republic of the Congo) Jonas Bahamboula
- (Republic of the Congo) Daniel Ebomoa
- (Republic of the Congo) Pierre Lingongo
- (Republic of the Congo) Joseph Mounoudzi
- (Republic of the Congo) Joseph Wamba
- (Ivory Coast) Gaston Bawa
- (Ivory Coast) Lucien Kouassi Kouame
- (Ivory Coast) Pascal Miézan
- (Egypt) Ahmed Abdel Baki
- (Egypt) Maher Hammam
- (Egypt) Ossama Khalil
- (Egypt) Mokhtar Mokhtar
- (Ethiopia) Tekalinge Kassahun
- (Ghana) Opoku Afriyle
- (Ghana) Ofei Ansah
- (Ghana) Ibrahim Kassum
- (Guinea) Ousmane Badara Bangoura
- (Guinea) Youssuf Camara
- (Guinea) Mamadou Aliou Keita
- (Guinea) Chérif Souleymane
- (Guinea) Ali Sylla
- (Guinea) Ismael Sylla
- (Guinea) Seydouba Sylla
- (Guinea) Ousmane Thiam Tollo
- (Mauritania) Gagny Coulibaly
- (Morocco) Abdelghani Lakhal
- (Morocco) Mustapha Tahir
- (Niger) Boukari Adamou
- (Niger) Moussa Kanfideni
- (Niger) Sanda Seydou
- (Nigeria) Adokie Amiesimaka
- (Nigeria) Kunle Awesu
- (Nigeria) Christian Chukwu
- (Nigeria) Kelechi Emeteole
- (Nigeria) Johnny N'Wadioha
- (Nigeria) Samuel Ojebode
- (Senegal) Abdoulaye Ba
- (Sierra Leone) Ismail Dyfan
- (Sierra Leone) Mohammed Sama
- (Sierra Leone) William Sango
- (Sierra Leone) Samuel Tray
- (Togo) Anani Afanou
- (Togo) Tabania Ametepé
- (Togo) Alirou Rachidou
- (Tunisia) Tarak Dhiab
- (Tunisia) Amor Jebali
- (Tunisia) Néjib Liman
- (Tunisia) Ali Kaabi
- (Tunisia) Moncef Khouini
- (Uganda) Abdulla Nasur
- (Uganda) Denis Obua
- (Uganda) Polly Ouma
- (Republic of Upper Volta) Joseph Ouattara
- (Republic of Upper Volta) Kouligo Zoma
- (Zambia) Alex Chola
- (Zambia) Obby Kapita

1 own goal

- (Malawi) Jack Chamangwana (playing against Zambia)
- (Nigeria) Godwin Odiye (playing against Tunisia)

== See also ==
- 1978 FIFA World Cup qualification
- 1978 FIFA World Cup qualification (UEFA)
- 1978 FIFA World Cup qualification (CONCACAF)
- 1978 FIFA World Cup qualification (CONMEBOL)
- 1978 FIFA World Cup qualification (AFC and OFC)
