= Africa Cup of Nations records and statistics =

Records of football tournament

This is a list of records and statistics of the Africa Cup of Nations.

== Summary ==
| Team | Winners | Runners-up | Third place | Fourth place | Total |
|---|---|---|---|---|---|
| Egypt | 7 (1957, 1959*^{1}, 1986*, 1998, 2006*, 2008, 2010) | 3 (1962^{1}, 2017, 2021) | 3 (1963^{1}, 1970^{1}, 1974*) | 4 (1976, 1980, 1984, 2025) | 17 |
| Cameroon | 5 (1984, 1988, 2000, 2002, 2017) | 2 (1986, 2008) | 2 (1972*, 2021*) | 1 (1992) | 10 |
| Ghana | 4 (1963*, 1965, 1978*, 1982) | 5 (1968, 1970, 1992, 2010, 2015) | 1 (2008*) | 4 (1996, 2012, 2013, 2017) | 14 |
| Nigeria | 3 (1980*, 1994, 2013) | 5 (1984, 1988, 1990, 2000*, 2023) | 9 (1976, 1978, 1992, 2002, 2004, 2006, 2010, 2019, 2025) | — | 17 |
| Ivory Coast | 3 (1992, 2015, 2023*) | 2 (2006, 2012) | 4 (1965, 1968, 1986, 1994) | 2 (1970, 2008) | 11 |
| Algeria | 2 (1990*, 2019) | 1 (1980) | 2 (1984, 1988) | 2 (1982, 2010) | 7 |
| Morocco | 2 (1976, 2025*) | 1 (2004) | 1 (1980) | 2 (1986, 1988*) | 6 |
| DR Congo | 2 (1968^{2}, 1974^{3}) | — | 2 (1998, 2015) | 2 (1972^{3}, 2023) | 6 |
| Senegal | 1 (2021) | 3 (2002, 2019, 2025) | — | 3 (1965, 1990, 2006) | 7 |
| Zambia | 1 (2012) | 2 (1974, 1994) | 3 (1982, 1990, 1996) | — | 6 |
| Tunisia | 1 (2004*) | 2 (1965*, 1996) | 1 (1962) | 3 (1978, 2000, 2019) | 7 |
| Sudan | 1 (1970*) | 2 (1959, 1963) | 1 (1957*) | — | 4 |
| South Africa | 1 (1996*) | 1 (1998) | 2 (2000, 2023) | — | 4 |
| Ethiopia | 1 (1962*) | 1 (1957) | 1 (1959) | 2 (1963, 1968*) | 5 |
| Congo | 1 (1972) | — | — | 1 (1974) | 2 |
| Mali | — | 1 (1972) | 2 (2012, 2013) | 3 (1994, 2002*, 2004) | 6 |
| Burkina Faso | — | 1 (2013) | 1 (2017) | 2 (1998*, 2021) | 4 |
| Uganda | — | 1 (1978) | — | 1 (1962) | 2 |
| Guinea | — | 1 (1976) | — | — | 1 |
| Libya | — | 1 (1982*) | — | — | 1 |
| Equatorial Guinea | — | — | — | 1 (2015*) | 1 |

* hosts
^{1} as United Arab Republic
^{2} as Congo-Kinshasa
^{3} as Zaire

== Debut of national teams ==
| Year | Debuting teams | | |
| Year | Teams | No. | Cum. |
|---|---|---|---|
| 1957 | Egypt, Ethiopia, Sudan | 3 | 3 |
| 1959 | none | 0 | 3 |
| 1962 | Tunisia, Uganda | 2 | 5 |
| 1963 | Ghana, Nigeria | 2 | 7 |
| 1965 | (Democratic Republic of the Congo) Congo-Léopoldville, Ivory Coast, Senegal | 3 | 10 |
| 1968 | Algeria, (Republic of the Congo) Congo-Brazzaville | 2 | 12 |
| 1970 | Cameroon, Guinea | 2 | 14 |
| 1972 | Kenya, Mali, Morocco, Togo | 4 | 18 |
| 1974 | Mauritius, Zambia | 2 | 20 |
| 1976 | none | 0 | 20 |
| 1978 | (Republic of Upper Volta) Upper Volta | 1 | 21 |
| 1980 | Tanzania | 1 | 22 |
| 1982 | Libya | 1 | 23 |
| 1984 | Malawi | 1 | 24 |
| 1986 | Mozambique | 1 | 25 |
| 1988 | none | 0 | 25 |
| 1990 | none | 0 | 25 |
| 1992 | none | 0 | 25 |
| 1994 | Gabon, Sierra Leone | 2 | 27 |
| 1996 | Angola, Liberia, South Africa | 3 | 30 |
| 1998 | Namibia | 1 | 31 |
| 2000 | none | 0 | 31 |
| 2002 | none | 0 | 31 |
| 2004 | Benin, Rwanda, Zimbabwe | 3 | 34 |
| 2006 | none | 0 | 34 |
| 2008 | none | 0 | 34 |
| 2010 | none | 0 | 34 |
| 2012 | Botswana, Equatorial Guinea, Niger | 3 | 37 |
| 2013 | Cape Verde | 1 | 38 |
| 2015 | none | 0 | 38 |
| 2017 | Guinea-Bissau | 1 | 39 |
| 2019 | Burundi, Madagascar, Mauritania | 3 | 42 |
| 2021 | Comoros, Gambia | 2 | 44 |
| 2023 | none | 0 | 44 |
| 2025 | none | 0 | 44 |
| 2027 | to be determined | ? | ? |

=== Teams yet to qualify for finals ===
Ten teams are yet to qualify for AFCON finals:

- Central African Republic (Note: eliminated to the AFCON 2027)
- Chad
- Djibouti
- Eritrea
- Eswatini
- Lesotho
- São Tomé and Príncipe
- Seychelles
- Somalia
- South Sudan

== Droughts ==
As of 2025 Africa Cup of Nations

| Team | Last appearance | Number of missed tournaments |
|---|---|---|
| Mauritius | 1974 | 27 |
| Liberia | 2002 | 12 |
| Rwanda | 2004 | 11 |
| Libya | 2012 | 7 |
| Niger | 2013 | 6 |
| Congo | 2015 | 5 |
| Togo | 2017 | 4 |
| Madagascar | 2019 | 4 |
| Burundi | 2019 | 3 |
| Ethiopia | 2021 | 2 |
| Malawi | 2021 | 2 |
| Sierra Leone | 2021 | 2 |
| Mauritania | 2023 | 2 |
| Cape Verde | 2023 | 1 |
| Gambia | 2023 | 1 |
| Ghana | 2023 | 1 |
| Guinea | 2023 | 1 |
| Guinea-Bissau | 2023 | 1 |
| Namibia | 2023 | 1 |

== Streaks ==
| Team | Qualified Since | Number of participations |
|---|---|---|
| Tunisia | 1994 | 17 |
| Ivory Coast | 2006 | 11 |
| Mali | 2008 | 11 (Note: qualified for 2027 AFCON) |
| Algeria | 2013 | 7 |
| Senegal | 2015 | 7 |
| Cameroon | 2015 | 7 |
| Morocco | 2017 | 6 |
| Egypt | 2017 | 5 |
| Nigeria | 2019 | 4 |
| Burkina Faso | 2021 | 4 |
| Equatorial Guinea | 2021 | 3 |
| Tanzania | 2023 | 3 (Note: qualified for 2027 as co-hosts) |
| Angola | 2023 | 2 |
| DR Congo | 2023 | 2 |
| Mozambique | 2023 | 2 |
| South Africa | 2023 | 2 |
| Zambia | 2023 | 2 |
| Benin | 2025 | 2 |
| Uganda | 2025 | 2 |
| Botswana | 2025 | 1 |
| Comoros | 2025 | 1 |
| Gabon | 2025 | 1 |
| Sudan | 2025 | 1 |
| Zimbabwe | 2025 | 1 |
| Kenya | 2027 | 1 |

== Overall team records ==
In this ranking 3 points are awarded for a win, 1 for a draw and 0 for a loss. As per statistical convention in football, matches decided in extra time are counted as wins and losses, while matches decided by penalty shoot-outs are counted as draws. Teams are ranked by total points, then by goal difference, then by goals scored.

As of 2025 Africa Cup of Nations

| Rank | Team | Part | Pld | W | D | L | GF | GA | GD | Points |
|---|---|---|---|---|---|---|---|---|---|---|
| 1 | Egypt (Note: Including one appearance as "United Arab Republic" representing a political union between Egypt and Syria, and another three appearances representing just Egypt but still under the name "United Arab Republic".) | 27 | 118 | 64 | 26 | 28 | 184 | 102 | +82 | 218 |
| 2 | Nigeria | 21 | 111 | 62 | 26 | 23 | 160 | 99 | +61 | 212 |
| 3 | Ghana | 24 | 105 | 54 | 23 | 28 | 138 | 93 | +45 | 185 |
| 4 | Ivory Coast | 26 | 111 | 51 | 29 | 31 | 162 | 117 | +45 | 182 |
| 5 | Cameroon | 22 | 100 | 49 | 32 | 19 | 148 | 96 | +52 | 179 |
| 6 | Morocco | 20 | 81 | 34 | 27 | 20 | 99 | 67 | +32 | 129 |
| 7 | Senegal | 18 | 78 | 35 | 19 | 24 | 99 | 63 | +36 | 124 |
| 8 | Algeria | 21 | 85 | 32 | 24 | 29 | 105 | 96 | +9 | 120 |
| 9 | Tunisia | 22 | 87 | 26 | 32 | 29 | 106 | 103 | +3 | 110 |
| 10 | Zambia | 19 | 73 | 26 | 24 | 23 | 84 | 76 | +8 | 102 |
| 11 | DR Congo (Note: Including seven appearances as Zaire.) | 21 | 84 | 23 | 30 | 31 | 99 | 109 | −10 | 99 |
| 12 | Mali | 14 | 63 | 21 | 24 | 18 | 74 | 73 | +1 | 87 |
| 13 | South Africa | 12 | 54 | 20 | 17 | 17 | 61 | 54 | +7 | 77 |
| 14 | Guinea | 14 | 52 | 15 | 18 | 19 | 65 | 72 | −7 | 63 |
| 15 | Burkina Faso (Note: Including one appearance as Upper Volta.) | 14 | 56 | 12 | 17 | 27 | 55 | 83 | −28 | 53 |
| 16 | Angola | 10 | 34 | 7 | 15 | 12 | 41 | 46 | −5 | 36 |
| 17 | Gabon | 9 | 28 | 7 | 10 | 11 | 28 | 37 | −9 | 31 |
| 18 | Sudan | 10 | 31 | 8 | 7 | 16 | 31 | 50 | −19 | 31 |
| 19 | Equatorial Guinea | 5 | 22 | 8 | 5 | 9 | 22 | 24 | -2 | 29 |
| 20 | Congo | 7 | 26 | 7 | 7 | 12 | 27 | 40 | −13 | 28 |
| 21 | Ethiopia | 11 | 30 | 7 | 4 | 19 | 31 | 67 | −36 | 25 |
| 22 | Cape Verde | 4 | 16 | 5 | 8 | 3 | 14 | 12 | +2 | 23 |
| 23 | Togo | 8 | 25 | 3 | 8 | 14 | 19 | 42 | −23 | 17 |
| 24 | Uganda | 8 | 26 | 4 | 4 | 18 | 24 | 45 | −21 | 16 |
| 25 | Libya | 3 | 11 | 3 | 5 | 3 | 12 | 13 | −1 | 14 |
| 26 | Zimbabwe | 6 | 18 | 3 | 3 | 12 | 20 | 37 | −17 | 12 |
| 27 | Gambia | 2 | 8 | 3 | 1 | 4 | 6 | 10 | -4 | 10 |
| 28 | Kenya | 6 | 17 | 2 | 4 | 11 | 11 | 31 | −20 | 10 |
| 29 | Madagascar | 1 | 5 | 2 | 2 | 1 | 7 | 7 | 0 | 8 |
| 30 | Malawi | 3 | 10 | 2 | 2 | 6 | 9 | 15 | −6 | 8 |
| 31 | Benin | 5 | 18 | 1 | 5 | 12 | 9 | 31 | −22 | 8 |
| 32 | Mozambique | 6 | 19 | 1 | 4 | 14 | 12 | 42 | −30 | 7 |
| 33 | Sierra Leone | 3 | 8 | 1 | 3 | 4 | 4 | 14 | −10 | 6 |
| 34 | Namibia | 4 | 13 | 1 | 3 | 9 | 11 | 31 | −20 | 6 |
| 35 | Liberia | 2 | 5 | 1 | 2 | 2 | 5 | 7 | −2 | 5 |
| 36 | Comoros | 2 | 7 | 1 | 2 | 4 | 4 | 9 | −5 | 5 |
| 37 | Mauritania | 3 | 10 | 1 | 2 | 7 | 4 | 16 | −12 | 5 |
| 38 | Tanzania | 4 | 13 | 0 | 5 | 8 | 9 | 23 | −14 | 5 |
| 39 | Rwanda | 1 | 3 | 1 | 1 | 1 | 3 | 3 | 0 | 4 |
| 40 | Guinea-Bissau | 4 | 12 | 0 | 3 | 9 | 4 | 19 | −15 | 3 |
| 41 | Niger | 2 | 6 | 0 | 1 | 5 | 1 | 9 | −8 | 1 |
| 42 | Burundi | 1 | 3 | 0 | 0 | 3 | 0 | 4 | −4 | 0 |
| 43 | Mauritius | 1 | 3 | 0 | 0 | 3 | 2 | 8 | −6 | 0 |
| 44 | Botswana | 2 | 6 | 0 | 0 | 6 | 2 | 16 | −14 | 0 |

== Medal table ==
| Rank | Nation | Gold | Silver | Bronze | Total |
|---|---|---|---|---|---|
| 1 | Egypt | 7 | 3 | 3 | 13 |
| 2 | Cameroon | 5 | 2 | 2 | 9 |
| 3 | Ghana | 4 | 5 | 1 | 10 |
| 4 | Nigeria | 3 | 5 | 9 | 17 |
| 5 | Ivory Coast | 3 | 2 | 4 | 9 |
| 6 | Algeria | 2 | 1 | 2 | 5 |
| 7 | Morocco | 2 | 1 | 1 | 4 |
| 8 | DR Congo | 2 | 0 | 2 | 4 |
| 9 | Senegal | 1 | 3 | 0 | 4 |
| 10 | Zambia | 1 | 2 | 3 | 6 |
| 11 | Sudan | 1 | 2 | 1 | 4 |
| 11 | Tunisia | 1 | 2 | 1 | 4 |
| 13 | South Africa | 1 | 1 | 2 | 4 |
| 14 | Ethiopia | 1 | 1 | 1 | 3 |
| 15 | Congo | 1 | 0 | 0 | 1 |
| 16 | Mali | 0 | 1 | 2 | 3 |
| 17 | Burkina Faso | 0 | 1 | 1 | 2 |
| 18 | Guinea | 0 | 1 | 0 | 1 |
| 18 | Libya | 0 | 1 | 0 | 1 |
| 18 | Uganda | 0 | 1 | 0 | 1 |
| Totals (20 entries) | | 35 | 35 | 35 | 105 |

== Comprehensive team results by tournament ==
For each tournament, the number of teams in each finals tournament (in brackets) are shown.

| Team | (Sudan) 1957 (3) | (United Arab Republic) 1959 (3) | (Ethiopia) 1962 (4) | (Ghana) 1963 (6) | (Tunisia) 1965 (6) | (Ethiopia) 1968 (8) | (Sudan) 1970 (8) | (Cameroon) 1972 (8) | (Egypt) 1974 (8) | (Ethiopia) 1976 (8) | (Ghana) 1978 (8) | (Nigeria) 1980 (8) | (Libya) 1982 (8) | (Ivory Coast) 1984 (8) | (Egypt) 1986 (8) | (Morocco) 1988 (8) | (Algeria) 1990 (8) | (Senegal) 1992 (12) | (Tunisia) 1994 (12) | (South Africa) 1996 (15) | (Burkina Faso) 1998 (16) | (Ghana) (Nigeria) 2000 (16) | (Mali) 2002 (16) | (Tunisia) 2004 (16) | (Egypt) 2006 (16) | (Ghana) 2008 (16) | (Angola) 2010 (15) | (Equatorial Guinea) (Gabon) 2012 (16) | (South Africa) 2013 (16) | (Equatorial Guinea) 2015 (16) | (Gabon) 2017 (16) | (Egypt) 2019 (24) | (Cameroon) 2021 (24) | (Ivory Coast) 2023 (24) | (Morocco) 2025 (24) | (Kenya) (Tanzania) (Uganda) 2027 (24) | Apps. |
|---|---|---|---|---|---|---|---|---|---|---|---|---|---|---|---|---|---|---|---|---|---|---|---|---|---|---|---|---|---|---|---|---|---|---|---|---|---|
North Africa Members
| Algeria | Part of France | | | | × | GS | • | • | • | • | • | 2nd | 4th | 3rd | GS | 3rd | 1st | GS | •• | QF | GS | QF | GS | QF | • | • | 4th | • | GS | QF | GS | 1st | GS | GS | QF | | 21 |
| Egypt | 1st | 1st | 2nd | 3rd | × | × | 3rd | • | 3rd | 4th | • | 4th | × | 4th | 1st | GS | GS | GS | QF | QF | 1st | QF | QF | GS | 1st | 1st | 1st | • | • | • | 2nd | R16 | 2nd | R16 | 4th | | 27 |
| Libya | | | | | | • | × | • | × | × | × | × | 2nd | • | • | × | × | × | × | × | × | • | • | • | GS | • | • | GS | • | • | • | • | • | • | • | | 3 |
| Morocco | × | × | × | • | × | × | • | GS | × | 1st | GS | 3rd | • | • | 4th | 4th | • | GS | • | • | QF | GS | GS | 2nd | GS | GS | • | GS | GS | •• | QF | R16 | QF | R16 | 1st | Q | 21 |
| Tunisia | × | × | 3rd | GS | 2nd | • | × | × | × | • | 4th | × | GS | • | • | • | • | • | GS | 2nd | QF | 4th | GS | 1st | QF | QF | GS | QF | GS | QF | QF | 4th | QF | GS | R16 | | 22 |
West Africa Members
| Benin | Part of France | | | | × | × | × | • | × | × | × | • | × | • | • | • | • | • | • | × | • | • | • | GS | • | GS | GS | • | • | • | • | QF | • | • | R16 | Q | 6 |
| Burkina Faso | Part of France | | | | × | • | × | × | • | × | GS | × | • | × | × | × | • | • | × | GS | 4th | GS | GS | GS | • | • | GS | GS | 2nd | GS | 3rd | • | 4th | R16 | R16 | Q | 15 |
| Cape Verde | Part of Portugal | | | | | | | | | | | | | | | | | | • | × | | • | • | • | • | • | • | • | QF | GS | • | • | R16 | QF | • | | 4 |
| Gambia | Part of the United Kingdom | | | | | × | × | × | × | • | × | • | • | • | • | • | × | • | × | × | × | × | • | • | • | • | • | • | • | × | • | • | QF | GS | • | | 2 |
| Ghana | UK | | • | 1st | 1st | 2nd | 2nd | • | • | • | 1st | GS | 1st | GS | • | • | • | 2nd | QF | 4th | GS | QF | QF | • | GS | 3rd | 2nd | 4th | 4th | 2nd | 4th | R16 | GS | GS | • | | 24 |
| Guinea | FRA | | | •• | • | • | GS | • | GS | 2nd | • | GS | • | • | • | • | • | • | GS | • | GS | • | × | QF | QF | QF | • | GS | • | QF | • | R16 | R16 | QF | • | | 14 |
| Guinea-Bissau | Part of Portugal | | | | | | | | | | | | | | | × | × | × | • | × | × | × | × | × | • | × | • | • | • | • | GS | GS | GS | GS | • | | 4 |
| Ivory Coast | Part of France | | | | 3rd | 3rd | 4th | • | GS | • | •• | GS | × | GS | 3rd | GS | GS | 1st | 3rd | GS | QF | GS | GS | • | 2nd | 4th | QF | 2nd | QF | 1st | GS | QF | R16 | 1st | QF | | 26 |
| Liberia | | | | × | × | • | × | × | × | • | × | × | • | × | • | • | • | × | • | GS | • | • | GS | • | • | • | • | • | • | • | • | • | • | • | • | | 2 |
| Mali | Part of France | | | | • | • | • | 2nd | • | • | • | • | • | • | • | • | • | • | 4th | • | • | • | 4th | 4th | • | GS | GS | 3rd | 3rd | GS | GS | R16 | R16 | QF | QF | Q | 15 |
| Mauritania | Part of France | | | | | | | | | × | × | • | • | × | • | × | × | • | × | • | • | × | • | • | • | • | • | × | × | • | • | GS | GS | R16 | • | • | 3 |
| Niger | Part of France | | | | | × | • | • | × | • | × | × | × | • | × | × | × | • | • | × | × | • | • | • | • | • | • | GS | GS | • | • | • | • | • | • | | 2 |
| Nigeria | | | × | GS | × | • | × | • | • | 3rd | 3rd | 1st | GS | 2nd | • | 2nd | 2nd | 3rd | 1st | •• | × | 2nd | 3rd | 3rd | 3rd | QF | 3rd | • | 1st | • | • | 3rd | R16 | 2nd | 3rd | | 21 |
| Senegal | Part of France | | | | 4th | GS | • | • | • | • | • | × | • | • | GS | • | 4th | QF | QF | • | • | QF | 2nd | QF | 4th | GS | • | GS | • | GS | QF | 2nd | 1st | R16 | 2nd | Q | 19 |
| Sierra Leone | Part of the UK | | | | | × | × | × | • | × | • | × | • | • | × | • | × | • | GS | GS | × | × | • | • | • | • | • | • | • | • | • | × | GS | • | • | | 3 |
| Togo | Part of France | | | | × | • | • | GS | × | • | • | • | • | GS | • | • | × | • | × | • | GS | GS | GS | • | GS | • | •• | • | QF | • | GS | • | • | • | • | | 8 |
Central Africa Members
| Cameroon | Part of France | | | | × | • | GS | 3rd | • | • | • | • | GS | 1st | 2nd | 1st | GS | 4th | • | GS | QF | 1st | 1st | QF | QF | 2nd | QF | • | • | GS | 1st | R16 | 3rd | R16 | QF | Q | 23 |
| Congo | Part of France | | | | | GS | × | 1st | 4th | • | GS | • | • | • | • | • | × | QF | • | • | • | GS | • | • | • | • | • | • | • | QF | • | • | • | • | • | | 7 |
| DR Congo | Part of Belgium | | | | GS | 1st | GS | 4th | 1st | GS | × | • | • | × | • | GS | • | QF | QF | QF | 3rd | GS | QF | GS | QF | • | • | • | GS | 3rd | QF | R16 | • | 4th | R16 | | 21 |
| Equatorial Guinea | Part of Spain | | | | | | | | | | | | | | | × | • | × | × | × | × | × | • | • | • | • | • | QF | • | 4th | • | • | QF | R16 | GS | | 5 |
| Gabon | Part of France | | | | | | × | • | × | × | • | × | × | • | • | • | • | • | GS | QF | • | GS | • | • | • | • | GS | QF | • | GS | GS | • | R16 | • | GS | | 9 |
East Africa Members
| Burundi | Part of Belgium | | | | | | | | × | • | × | × | × | × | × | × | × | × | • | × | × | • | • | • | • | • | • | • | • | • | • | GS | • | • | • | | 1 |
| Ethiopia | 2nd | 3rd | 1st | 4th | GS | 4th | GS | • | • | GS | • | • | GS | • | × | × | • | × | • | • | • | × | • | • | • | • | × | • | GS | • | • | • | GS | • | • | | 11 |
| Kenya | | | • | • | • | • | • | GS | • | • | • | • | • | × | • | GS | GS | GS | • | × | • | • | • | GS | • | • | • | • | • | • | • | GS | • | × | • | Q | 7 |
| Rwanda | Part of Belgium | | | | | | | | | | × | × | • | • | × | × | × | × | × | × | × | • | • | GS | • | • | • | • | • | × | • | • | • | • | • | | 1 |
| Sudan | 3rd | 2nd | • | 2nd | • | • | 1st | GS | • | GS | × | • | × | • | × | • | • | • | • | • | × | × | • | • | • | GS | • | QF | • | • | • | • | GS | • | R16 | | 10 |
| Tanzania | | | | | | × | • | • | • | • | • | GS | × | • | × | • | • | • | × | • | • | • | • | × | • | • | • | • | • | • | • | GS | • | GS | R16 | Q | 5 |
| Uganda | | | 4th | × | • | GS | • | • | GS | GS | 2nd | × | × | • | • | • | × | • | • | • | • | • | • | • | • | • | • | • | • | • | GS | R16 | • | • | GS | Q | 9 |
Southern Africa Members
| Angola | Part of Portugal | | | | | | | | | | | | • | • | × | • | • | • | • | GS | GS | • | • | • | GS | QF | QF | GS | GS | • | • | GS | • | QF | GS | | 10 |
| Botswana | Part of the United Kingdom | | | | | | | | | | × | × | × | × | × | × | × | × | • | • | • | • | • | • | • | • | • | GS | • | • | • | • | • | • | GS | | 2 |
| Comoros | Part of France | | | | | | | | | | | | | | | | | | | | | | | × | × | × | • | • | • | • | • | • | R16 | • | GS | | 2 |
| Madagascar | Part of France | | | | × | × | × | • | • | × | × | • | • | • | • | • | × | • | × | × | × | • | • | • | • | • | • | • | • | • | • | QF | • | • | • | • | 1 |
| Malawi | Part of the United Kingdom | | | | | | | | × | • | • | • | • | GS | • | • | • | • | • | • | • | • | • | • | • | • | GS | • | • | • | • | • | R16 | • | • | | 3 |
| Mauritius | | | | | | • | • | • | GS | • | • | • | • | • | • | × | • | • | • | • | • | • | • | • | • | • | • | • | × | • | • | • | • | • | • | • | 1 |
| Mozambique | Part of Portugal | | | | | | | | | | | × | • | • | GS | • | • | • | • | GS | GS | • | • | • | • | • | GS | • | • | • | • | • | • | GS | R16 | | 6 |
| Namibia | Part of South Africa | | | | | | | | | | | | | | | | | × | × | • | GS | • | • | • | • | GS | • | • | • | • | • | GS | • | R16 | • | | 4 |
| South Africa | •• | Banned because of apartheid | | | | | | | | | | | | | | | | | • | 1st | 2nd | 3rd | QF | GS | GS | GS | • | • | QF | GS | • | QF | • | 3rd | R16 | | 12 |
| Zambia | | | | | × | × | • | • | 2nd | • | GS | • | 3rd | • | GS | × | 3rd | QF | 2nd | 3rd | GS | GS | GS | • | GS | GS | QF | 1st | GS | GS | • | • | • | GS | GS | | 19 |
| Zimbabwe | | | | | | | | | | | | | • | • | • | • | • | • | • | • | • | • | • | GS | GS | • | • | • | • | • | GS | GS | GS | × | GS | | 6 |
| Team | (Sudan) 1957 (3) | (United Arab Republic) 1959 (3) | (Ethiopia) 1962 (4) | (Ghana) 1963 (6) | (Tunisia) 1965 (6) | (Ethiopia) 1968 (8) | (Sudan) 1970 (8) | (Cameroon) 1972 (8) | (Egypt) 1974 (8) | (Ethiopia) 1976 (8) | (Ghana) 1978 (8) | (Nigeria) 1980 (8) | (Libya) 1982 (8) | (Ivory Coast) 1984 (8) | (Egypt) 1986 (8) | (Morocco) 1988 (8) | (Algeria) 1990 (8) | (Senegal) 1992 (12) | (Tunisia) 1994 (12) | (South Africa) 1996 (15) | (Burkina Faso) 1998 (16) | (Ghana) (Nigeria) 2000 (16) | (Mali) 2002 (16) | (Tunisia) 2004 (16) | (Egypt) 2006 (16) | (Ghana) 2008 (16) | (Angola) 2010 (15) | (Equatorial Guinea) (Gabon) 2012 (16) | (South Africa) 2013 (16) | (Equatorial Guinea) 2015 (16) | (Gabon) 2017 (16) | (Egypt) 2019 (24) | (Cameroon) 2021 (24) | (Ivory Coast) 2023 (24) | (Morocco) 2025 (24) | (Kenya) (Tanzania) (Uganda) 2027 (24) | Apps. |

Legend

- 1st – Champions
- 2nd – Runners-up
- 3rd – Third place
- 4th – Fourth place
- QF – Quarter-finals
- R16 – Round of 16
- GS – Group stage
- Q — Qualified for upcoming tournament
- •• — Qualified but withdrew / Disqualified after qualification
- • — Did not qualify
- × — Did not enter / Withdrew / Disqualified
- — Hosts
- — Not affiliated to CAF

== Teams yet to qualify for finals ==
The following teen teams which are current CAF members have never qualified for the Africa Cup of Nations.

Legend

- • – Did not qualify
- × – Did not enter / withdrew / banned

For each tournament, the number of teams in each finals tournament (in brackets) are shown.

| Team | (Sudan) 1957 (3) | (United Arab Republic) 1959 (3) | (Ethiopia) 1962 (4) | (Ghana) 1963 (6) | (Tunisia) 1965 (6) | (Ethiopia) 1968 (8) | (Sudan) 1970 (8) | (Cameroon) 1972 (8) | (Egypt) 1974 (8) | (Ethiopia) 1976 (8) | (Ghana) 1978 (8) | (Nigeria) 1980 (8) | (Libya) 1982 (8) | (Ivory Coast) 1984 (8) | (Egypt) 1986 (8) | (Morocco) 1988 (8) | (Algeria) 1990 (8) | (Senegal) 1992 (12) | (Tunisia) 1994 (12) | (South Africa) 1996 (15) | (Burkina Faso) 1998 (16) | (Ghana) (Nigeria) 2000 (16) | (Mali) 2002 (16) | (Tunisia) 2004 (16) | (Egypt) 2006 (16) | (Ghana) 2008 (16) | (Angola) 2010 (15) | (Equatorial Guinea) (Gabon) 2012 (16) | (South Africa) 2013 (16) | (Equatorial Guinea) 2015 (16) | (Gabon) 2017 (16) | (Egypt) 2019 (24) | (Cameroon) 2021 (24) | (Ivory Coast) 2023 (24) | (Morocco) 2025 (24) | (Kenya) (Tanzania) (Uganda) 2027 (24) | Attempts |
|---|---|---|---|---|---|---|---|---|---|---|---|---|---|---|---|---|---|---|---|---|---|---|---|---|---|---|---|---|---|---|---|---|---|---|---|---|---|
| Central African Republic | Part of France | | | | | | × | × | • | × | × | × | × | × | × | • | × | × | × | × | × | × | • | • | × | × | × | • | • | • | • | • | • | • | • | • | 13 |
| Chad | Part of France | | | | × | × | × | × | × | × | × | × | × | × | × | × | × | • | • | × | × | • | • | • | • | • | • | • | • | • | × | × | • | • | • | • | 15 |
| Djibouti | Part of France | | | | | | | | | | | | | | | | | | × | × | × | • | • | × | × | × | • | × | × | × | • | • | • | • | • | • | 15 |
| Eritrea | Part of Ethiopia | | | | | | | | | | | | | | | | | | | | | • | • | • | • | • | × | × | × | × | × | × | × | × | × | • | 6 |
| Eswatini | Part of United Kingdom | | | | | | | | | | × | × | × | × | • | × | • | • | × | × | × | • | • | • | • | • | • | • | × | • | • | • | • | • | • | • | 17 |
| Lesotho | Part of United Kingdom | | | | | | | | • | × | × | • | • | × | × | × | × | × | • | • | × | • | • | • | • | • | • | × | • | • | • | • | • | • | • | ? | 19 |
| São Tomé and Príncipe | Part of Portugal | | | | | | | | | | | | | | | × | × | × | × | × | × | • | • | × | • | × | × | × | • | • | • | • | • | • | • | • | 11 |
| Seychelles | Part of United Kingdom | | | | | | | | | | | | | | | × | • | × | × | × | • | × | × | • | • | • | • | × | • | × | • | • | • | • | × | • | 12 |
| Somalia | Part of Italy & UK | | | | | | × | • | • | × | × | × | • | • | • | × | × | × | × | × | × | × | × | × | × | × | × | × | × | × | × | × | • | • | • | • | 9 |
| South Sudan | Part of Sudan | | | | | | | | | | | | | | | | | | | | | | | | | | × | × | • | • | • | • | • | • | • | • | 8 |

== Results of host nations ==
| Year | Host nation | Result |
|---|---|---|
| 1957 | Sudan | Third place |
| 1959 | United Arab Republic | Champions |
| 1962 | Ethiopia | Champions |
| 1963 | Ghana | Champions |
| 1965 | Tunisia | Runners-up |
| 1968 | Ethiopia | Fourth place |
| 1970 | Sudan | Champions |
| 1972 | Cameroon | Third place |
| 1974 | Egypt | Third place |
| 1976 | Ethiopia | Group stage |
| 1978 | Ghana | Champions |
| 1980 | Nigeria | Champions |
| 1982 | Libya | Runners-up |
| 1984 | Ivory Coast | Group stage |
| 1986 | Egypt | Champions |
| 1988 | Morocco | Fourth place |
| 1990 | Algeria | Champions |
| 1992 | Senegal | Quarter-finals |
| 1994 | Tunisia | Group stage |
| 1996 | South Africa | Champions |
| 1998 | Burkina Faso | Fourth place |
| 2000 | Ghana | Quarter-finals |
| 2000 | Nigeria | Runners-up |
| 2002 | Mali | Fourth place |
| 2004 | Tunisia | Champions |
| 2006 | Egypt | Champions |
| 2008 | Ghana | Third place |
| 2010 | Angola | Quarter-finals |
| 2012 | Equatorial Guinea | Quarter-finals |
| 2012 | Gabon | Quarter-finals |
| 2013 | South Africa | Quarter-finals |
| 2015 | Equatorial Guinea | Fourth place |
| 2017 | Gabon | Group stage |
| 2019 | Egypt | Round of 16 |
| 2021 | Cameroon | Third place |
| 2023 | Ivory Coast | Champions |
| 2025 | Morocco | Champions |
| 2027 | Kenya | To be determined |
| 2027 | Tanzania | To be determined |
| 2027 | Uganda | To be determined |

== Results of defending champions ==
| Year | Defending champions | Result |
|---|---|---|
| 1959 | United Arab Republic | Champions |
| 1962 | United Arab Republic | Runners-up |
| 1963 | Ethiopia | Fourth place |
| 1965 | Ghana | Champions |
| 1968 | Ghana | Runners-up |
| 1970 | Congo-Kinshasa | Group stage |
| 1972 | Sudan | Group stage |
| 1974 | Congo | Fourth place |
| 1976 | Zaire | Group stage |
| 1978 | Morocco | Group stage |
| 1980 | Ghana | Group stage |
| 1982 | Nigeria | Group stage |
| 1984 | Ghana | Group stage |
| 1986 | Cameroon | Runners-up |
| 1988 | Egypt | Group stage |
| 1990 | Cameroon | Group stage |
| 1992 | Algeria | Group stage |
| 1994 | Ivory Coast | Third place |
| 1996 | Nigeria | Withdrew |
| 1998 | South Africa | Runners-up |
| 2000 | Egypt | Quarter-finals |
| 2002 | Cameroon | Champions |
| 2004 | Cameroon | Quarter-finals |
| 2006 | Tunisia | Quarter-finals |
| 2008 | Egypt | Champions |
| 2010 | Egypt | Champions |
| 2012 | Egypt | Did not qualify |
| 2013 | Zambia | Group stage |
| 2015 | Nigeria | Did not qualify |
| 2017 | Ivory Coast | Group stage |
| 2019 | Cameroon | Round of 16 |
| 2021 | Algeria | Group stage |
| 2023 | Senegal | Round of 16 |
| 2025 | Ivory Coast | Quarter-finals |
| 2027 | Morocco | To be determined |

== General statistics by tournament ==
| Year | Hosts | Champions (titles) | Winning coach | Top scorer(s) (goals) | Best player award |
|---|---|---|---|---|---|
| 1957 | Sudan | Egypt (1) | (Egypt) Mourad Fahmy | (Egypt) Ad-Diba (5) | (Egypt) Ad-Diba |
| 1959 | United Arab Republic | United Arab Republic (2) | (Hungary) Pál Titkos | (United Arab Republic) Mahmoud El-Gohary (3) | (United Arab Republic) Ad-Diba |
| 1962 | Ethiopia | Ethiopia (1) | (Ethiopia) Ydnekatchew Tessema | (Ethiopia) Mengistu Worku (3) (United Arab Republic) Badawi Abdel Fattah (3) | (Ethiopia) Mengistu Worku |
| 1963 | Ghana | Ghana (1) | (Ghana) Charles Gyamfi | (United Arab Republic) Hassan El-Shazly (6) | (United Arab Republic) Hassan El-Shazly |
| 1965 | Tunisia | Ghana (2) | (Ghana) Charles Gyamfi | (Ghana) Ben Acheampong (3) (Ghana) Osei Kofi (3) (Ivory Coast) Eustache Manglé (3) | (Ghana) Osei Kofi |
| 1968 | Ethiopia | Congo-Kinshasa (1) | (Hungary) Ferenc Csanádi | (Ivory Coast) Laurent Pokou (6) | (Democratic Republic of the Congo) Kazadi Mwamba |
| 1970 | Sudan | Sudan (1) | (Czechoslovakia) Jiří Starosta | (Ivory Coast) Laurent Pokou (8) | (Ivory Coast) Laurent Pokou |
| 1972 | Cameroon | Congo (1) | (Republic of the Congo) Adolphe Bibanzoulou | (Mali) Salif Keïta (5) | (Republic of the Congo) François M'Pelé |
| 1974 | Egypt | Zaire (2) | (Socialist Federal Republic of Yugoslavia) Blagoje Vidinić | (Zaire) Ndaye Mulamba (9) | (Zaire) Ndaye Mulamba |
| 1976 | Ethiopia | Morocco (1) | (Romania) Virgil Mărdărescu | (Guinea) Mamadou Aliou Keïta (4) | (Morocco) Ahmed Faras |
| 1978 | Ghana | Ghana (3) | (Ghana) Fred Osam-Duodu | (Uganda) Phillip Omondi (3) (Ghana) Opoku Afriyie (3) (Nigeria) Segun Odegbami (3) | (Ghana) Karim Abdul Razak |
| 1980 | Nigeria | Nigeria (1) | (Brazil) Otto Glória | (Morocco) Khalid Labied (3) (Nigeria) Segun Odegbami (3) | (Nigeria) Christian Chukwu |
| 1982 | Libya | Ghana (4) | (Ghana) Charles Gyamfi | (Ghana) George Alhassan (4) | (Libya) Fawzi Al-Issawi |
| 1984 | Ivory Coast | Cameroon (1) | (Socialist Federal Republic of Yugoslavia) Radivoje Ognjanović | (Egypt) Taher Abouzaid (4) | (Cameroon) Théophile Abega |
| 1986 | Egypt | Egypt (3) | (England) Mike Smith | (Cameroon) Roger Milla (4) | (Cameroon) Roger Milla |
| 1988 | Morocco | Cameroon (2) | (France) Claude Le Roy | (Algeria) Lakhdar Belloumi (2) (Cameroon) Roger Milla (2) (Ivory Coast) Abdoulaye Traoré (2) (Egypt) Gamal Abdelhamid (2) | (Cameroon) Roger Milla |
| 1990 | Algeria | Algeria (1) | (Algeria) Abdelhamid Kermali | (Algeria) Djamel Menad (4) | (Algeria) Rabah Madjer |
| 1992 | Senegal | Ivory Coast (1) | (Ivory Coast) Yeo Martial | (Nigeria) Rashidi Yekini (4) | (Ghana) Abedi Pele |
| 1994 | Tunisia | Nigeria (2) | (Netherlands) Clemens Westerhof | (Nigeria) Rashidi Yekini (5) | (Nigeria) Rashidi Yekini |
| 1996 | South Africa | South Africa (1) | (South Africa) Clive Barker | (Zambia) Kalusha Bwalya (5) | (Zambia) Kalusha Bwalya |
| 1998 | Burkina Faso | Egypt (4) | (Egypt) Mahmoud El-Gohary | (Egypt) Hossam Hassan (7) (South Africa) Benni McCarthy (7) | (South Africa) Benni McCarthy |
| 2000 | Ghana; Nigeria | Cameroon (3) | (France) Pierre Lechantre | (South Africa) Shaun Bartlett (5) | (Cameroon) Lauren |
| 2002 | Mali | Cameroon (4) | (Germany) Winfried Schäfer | (Cameroon) Patrick Mboma (3) (Cameroon) Salomon Olembé (3) (Nigeria) Julius Aghahowa (3) | (Cameroon) Rigobert Song |
| 2004 | Tunisia | Tunisia (1) | (France) Roger Lemerre | (Cameroon) Patrick Mboma (4) (Mali) Frédéric Kanouté (4) (Morocco) Youssef Mokhtari (4) (Nigeria) Jay-Jay Okocha (4) (Tunisia) Francileudo Santos (4) | (Nigeria) Jay-Jay Okocha |
| 2006 | Egypt | Egypt (5) | (Egypt) Hassan Shehata | (Cameroon) Samuel Eto'o (5) | (Egypt) Ahmed Hassan |
| 2008 | Ghana | Egypt (6) | (Egypt) Hassan Shehata | (Cameroon) Samuel Eto'o (5) | (Egypt) Hosny Abd Rabo |
| 2010 | Angola | Egypt (7) | (Egypt) Hassan Shehata | (Egypt) Mohamed Nagy (5) | (Egypt) Ahmed Hassan |
| 2012 | Gabon; Equatorial Guinea | Zambia (1) | (France) Hervé Renard | (Angola) Manucho (3) (Ivory Coast) Didier Drogba (3) (Gabon) Pierre-Emerick Aubameyang (3) (Mali) Cheick Diabaté (3) (Morocco) Houssine Kharja (3) (Zambia) Christopher Katongo (3) (Zambia) Emmanuel Mayuka (3) | (Zambia) Christopher Katongo |
| 2013 | South Africa | Nigeria (3) | (Nigeria) Stephen Keshi | (Ghana) Mubarak Wakaso (4) (Nigeria) Emmanuel Emenike (4) | (Burkina Faso) Jonathan Pitroipa |
| 2015 | Equatorial Guinea | Ivory Coast (2) | (France) Hervé Renard | (Republic of the Congo) Thievy Bifouma (3) (Democratic Republic of the Congo) Dieumerci Mbokani (3) (Equatorial Guinea) Javier Balboa (3) (Ghana) André Ayew (3) (Tunisia) Ahmed Akaïchi (3) | (Ghana) Christian Atsu |
| 2017 | Gabon | Cameroon (5) | (Belgium) Hugo Broos | (Democratic Republic of the Congo) Junior Kabananga (3) | (Cameroon) Christian Bassogog |
| 2019 | Egypt | Algeria (2) | (Algeria) Djamel Belmadi | (Nigeria) Odion Ighalo (5) | (Algeria) Ismaël Bennacer |
| 2021 | Cameroon | Senegal (1) | (Senegal) Aliou Cissé | (Cameroon) Vincent Aboubakar (8) | (Senegal) Sadio Mané |
| 2023 | Ivory Coast | Ivory Coast (3) | (Ivory Coast) Emerse Faé | (Equatorial Guinea) Emilio Nsue (5) | (Nigeria) William Troost-Ekong |
| 2025 | Morocco | Morocco (2) | (Morocco) Walid Regragui | (Morocco) Brahim Díaz (5) | (Senegal) Sadio Mané |

=== Records ===
Most titles: 7

- Egypt

Teams winning on debut: 3

- Egypt (1957)
- Ghana (1963)
- South Africa (1996)

Consecutive title wins: 3

- Egypt (2006, 2008, 2010)

Most appearances: 27

- Egypt

Most consecutive appearances: 17

- Tunisia (1994–2025)

== Goalscorers ==
=== Overall top goalscorers ===
Players in bold are still active at the international level as of 2026. Years in bold indicate a winning campaign.

| Rank | Player | Team | Goals scored | Matches played | Goals per match | Tournament(s) |
|---|---|---|---|---|---|---|
| 1 | Samuel Eto'o | Cameroon | 18 | 29 | 0.62 | 6 (**2000**, **2002**, 2004, 2006, 2008, 2010) |
| 2 | Laurent Pokou | Ivory Coast | 14 | 12 | 1.17 | 4 (1968, 1970, 1974, 1980) |
| 3 | Rashidi Yekini | Nigeria | 13 | 20 | 0.65 | 4 (1988, 1990, 1992, **1994**) |
| 4 | Hassan El-Shazly | Egypt | 12 | 8 | 1.50 | 3 (1963, 1970, 1974) |
| 5 | Patrick Mboma | Cameroon | 11 | 17 | 0.65 | 4 (1998, **2000**, **2002**, 2004) |
| 5 | Hossam Hassan | Egypt | 11 | 21 | 0.52 | 7 (**1986**, 1988, 1992, **1998**, 2000, 2002, **2006**) |
| 5 | Didier Drogba | Ivory Coast | 11 | 24 | 0.46 | 5 (2006, 2008, 2010, 2012, 2013) |
| 5 | **Mohamed Salah** | Egypt | 11 | 25 | 0.44 | 5 (2017, 2019, 2021, 2023, 2025) |
| 5 | **Sadio Mané** | Senegal | 11 | 29 | 0.38 | 6 (2015, 2017, 2019, **2021**, 2023, 2025) |
| 10 | Ndaye Mulamba | DR Congo | 10 | 10 | 1.00 | 2 (**1974**, 1976) |
| 10 | Francileudo Santos | Tunisia | 10 | 12 | 0.83 | 3 (**2004**, 2006, 2008) |
| 10 | Joel Tiéhi | Ivory Coast | 10 | 15 | 0.67 | 4 (**1992**, 1994, 1996, 1998) |
| 10 | Mengistu Worku | Ethiopia | 10 | 17 | 0.59 | 6 (1959, **1962**, 1963, 1965, 1968, 1970) |
| 10 | Kalusha Bwalya | Zambia | 10 | 23 | 0.43 | 6 (1986, 1992, 1994, 1996, 1998, 2000) |
| 10 | André Ayew | Ghana | 10 | 36 | 0.28 | 8 (2008, 2010, 2012, 2015, 2017, 2019, 2021, 2023) |
| 16 | Manucho | Angola | 9 | 14 | 0.64 | 4 (2008, 2010, 2012, 2013) |
| 16 | Vincent Aboubakar | Cameroon | 9 | 16 | 0.56 | 4 (2015, **2017**, 2021, 2023) |
| 16 | Riyad Mahrez | Algeria | 9 | 23 | 0.39 | 6 (2015, 2017, **2019**, 2021, 2023, 2025) |
| 16 | Abdoulaye Traoré | Ivory Coast | 9 | 22 | 0.41 | 6 (1986, 1988, 1990, **1992**, 1994, 1996) |
| 20 | Pascal Feindouno | Guinea | 8 | 13 | 0.61 | 4 (2004, 2006, 2008, 2012) |
| 20 | Ahmed Hassan | Egypt | 8 | 31 | 0.26 | 8 (1996, **1998**, 2000, 2002, 2004, **2006**, **2008**, **2010**) |
| 20 | Seydou Keita | Mali | 8 | 31 | 0.26 | 7 (2002, 2004, 2008, 2010, 2012, 2013, 2015) |
| 20 | Asamoah Gyan | Ghana | 8 | 31 | 0.26 | 7 (2008, 2010, 2012, 2013, 2015, 2017, 2019) |
| 24 | Osei Kofi | Ghana | 7 | 8 | 0.87 | 3 (**1963**, **1965**, 1968) |
| 24 | Ali Abo Gresha | Egypt | 7 | 9 | 0.78 | 2 (1970, 1974) |
| 24 | Taher Abouzeid | Egypt | 7 | 10 | 0.70 | 2 (1984, **1986**) |
| 24 | Frédéric Kanouté | Mali | 7 | 11 | 0.64 | 3 (2004, 2008, 2010) |
| 24 | Flávio | Angola | 7 | 12 | 0.58 | 4 (2006, 2008, 2010, 2012) |
| 24 | Benni McCarthy | South Africa | 7 | 12 | 0.58 | 3 (1998, 2002, 2006) |
| 24 | Pierre-Emerick Aubameyang | Gabon | 7 | 15 | 0.47 | 5 (2010, 2012, 2015, 2017, 2025) |
| 24 | Christopher Katongo | Zambia | 7 | 17 | 0.41 | 5 (2006, 2008, 2010, **2012**, 2013) |
| 24 | Roger Milla | Cameroon | 7 | 18 | 0.39 | 4 (1982, **1984**, 1986, **1988**) |
| 24 | Abedi Pele | Ghana | 7 | 18 | 0.39 | 5 (**1982**, 1992, 1994, 1996, 1998) |
| 24 | Jay-Jay Okocha | Nigeria | 7 | 22 | 0.32 | 5 (**1994**, 2000, 2002, 2004, 2006) |
| 24 | Youssef Msakni | Tunisia | 7 | 29 | 0.24 | 8 (2010, 2012, 2013, 2015, 2017, 2019, 2021, 2023) |
| 36 | George Alhassan | Ghana | 6 | 7 | 0.86 | 3 (**1978**, **1982**, 1984) |
| 36 | Wilberforce Mfum | Ghana | 6 | 8 | 0.75 | 2 (**1963**, 1968) |
| 36 | Ahmed Faras | Morocco | 6 | 9 | 0.67 | 3 (1972, **1976**, 1978) |
| 36 | Mayanga Maku | DR Congo | 6 | 10 | 0.60 | 3 (1970, 1972, **1974**) |
| 36 | Segun Odegbami | Nigeria | 6 | 10 | 0.60 | 2 (1978, **1980**) |
| 36 | Mohamed Aboutrika | Egypt | 6 | 11 | 0.54 | 2 (**2006**, **2008**) |
| 36 | Shaun Bartlett | South Africa | 6 | 14 | 0.43 | 4 (**1996**, 2000, 2002, 2004) |
| 36 | Emilio Nsue | Equatorial Guinea | 6 | 15 | 0.40 | 4 (2015, 2021, 2023, 2025) |
| 36 | Julius Aghahowa | Nigeria | 6 | 15 | 0.40 | 4 (2000, 2002, 2004, 2006) |
| 36 | Gervinho | Ivory Coast | 6 | 17 | 0.35 | 5 (2008, 2010, 2012, 2013, **2015**) |
| 36 | Lakhdar Belloumi | Algeria | 6 | 18 | 0.33 | 4 (1980, 1982, 1984, 1988) |
| 36 | Karl Toko Ekambi | Cameroon | 6 | 18 | 0.33 | 4 (**2017**, 2019, 2021, 2023) |
| 36 | **Jordan Ayew** | Ghana | 6 | 25 | 0.24 | 6 (2012, 2015, 2017, 2019, 2021, 2023) |
| 36 | Yaya Touré | Ivory Coast | 6 | 29 | 0.20 | 6 (2006, 2008, 2010, 2012, 2013, **2015**) |
| 36 | **Lassine Sinayoko** | Mali | 6 | 10 | 0.60 | 3 (2021, 2023, 2025) |

=== Goalscoring records ===
==== Landmark goalscorers ====
Raafat Attia scored the first ever goal at the Africa Cup of Nations; in the first match of the inaugural tournament on 10 February 1957, he got the opening goal for Egypt against hosts Sudan in a 2–1 victory.

Ad-Diba was the first ever player to score a hat-trick in an Africa Cup of Nations match; he scored four for Egypt in a 4–0 victory against Ethiopia on 16 February 1957, the final match of the inaugural tournament.

Ad-Diba was also the first ever top goalscorer for an Africa Cup of Nations tournament, scoring 5 goals for Egypt in 1957.

==== Oldest goalscorer ====
Hossam Hassan was 39 years and 174 days old when he scored for Egypt against DR Congo in a 4–1 victory on 3 February 2006.

==== Youngest goalscorer ====
Shiva N'Zigou was 16 years and 93 days old when he scored for Gabon against South Africa in a 3–1 defeat on 27 January 2000. (Note: He was actually 21 years old when he scored against South Africa. He lied and confessed later that he was 5 years older. However, CAF still recognizes him as the youngest goalscorer)

==== Fastest goals ====
- **1st minute**, Hassan El-Shazly for Egypt against Ivory Coast in 1974 (2–0 victory).
- **1st minute**, Chérif Fetoui for Morocco against Congo in 1976 (2–2 draw).
- **1st minute**, Phillip Omondi for Uganda against Congo in 1978 (3–1 victory).
- **1st minute**, Tueba Menayame for Zaire against Cameroon in 1992 (1–1 draw).
- **1st minute**, Ayman Mansour for Egypt against Gabon in 1994 (4–0 victory).
- **1st minute**, Tijani Babangida for Nigeria against South Africa in 2000 (2–0 victory).
- **1st minute**, Soufiane Alloudi for Morocco against Namibia in 2008 (5–1 victory).

==== Latest goal (regulation time) ====
90+10th minute, Bruno Zita Mbanangoyé for Gabon against Morocco in 2012 (3–2 victory).

==== Latest goal (including extra time) ====
120+4th minute, Mohamed Salah for Egypt against Benin in 2025 (3–1 victory).

==== Most goals in a single match ====
Laurent Pokou scored 5 goals for Ivory Coast in a 6–1 victory against Ethiopia in 1970.

==== Most goals in a single tournament ====
Ndaye Mulamba scored 9 goals for Zaire in the 1974 tournament.

==== Goalscoring goalkeeper in the tournament ====
Kennedy Mweene is the first and only goalkeeper to score a goal (for Zambia) in an Africa Cup of Nations, in 2013.

==== Most hat-tricks ====
Hassan El-Shazly scored 2 tournament hat-tricks for the United Arab Republic: one in 1963 and one in 1970.

==== Most tournaments with a goal ====
Kalusha Bwalya (for Zambia), Samuel Eto'o (for Cameroon), Asamoah Gyan and André Ayew (both for Ghana) each scored at least one goal in a record six different tournaments. Bold indicates a winning campaign.

| No. of tournaments | Player | Country | Years (No. of goals scored) | Total goals |
|---|---|---|---|---|
| 6 | Samuel Eto'o | Cameroon | **2000** (4), **2002** (1), 2004 (1), 2006 (5), 2008 (5), 2010 (2) | 18 |
| 6 | André Ayew | Ghana | 2010 (1), 2012 (2), 2015 (3), 2017 (2), 2019 (1), 2021 (1) | 10 |
| 6 | Kalusha Bwalya | Zambia | 1986 (1), 1992 (1), 1994 (1), 1996 (5), 1998 (1), 2000 (1) | 10 |
| 6 | Asamoah Gyan | Ghana | 2008 (1), 2010 (3), 2012 (1), 2013 (1), 2015 (1), 2017 (1) | 8 |
| 5 | Didier Drogba | Ivory Coast | 2006 (3), 2008 (3), 2010 (1), 2012 (3), 2013 (1) | 11 |
| 5 | Sadio Mané | Senegal | 2017 (2), 2019 (3), **2021** (3), 2023 (1), 2025 (2) | 11 |
| 5 | Mohamed Salah | Egypt | 2017 (2), 2019 (2), 2021 (2), 2023 (1), 2025 (4) | 11 |
| 5 | Abdoulaye Traoré | Ivory Coast | 1986 (3), 1988 (2), 1990 (2), **1992** (1), 1994 (1) | 9 |
| 5 | Youssef Msakni | Tunisia | 2012 (2), 2013 (1), 2017 (1), 2019 (2), 2021 (1) | 7 |
| 5 | Yaya Touré | Ivory Coast | 2006 (1), 2008 (1), 2012 (1), 2013 (2), **2015** (1) | 6 |
| 4 | Rashidi Yekini | Nigeria | 1988 (1), 1990 (3), 1992 (4), **1994** (5) | 13 |
| 4 | Mengistu Worku | Ethiopia | **1962** (3), 1963 (2), 1968 (2), 1970 (3) | 10 |
| 4 | Joel Tiéhi | Ivory Coast | **1992** (1), 1994 (4), 1996 (1), 1998 (4) | 10 |
| 4 | Riyad Mahrez | Algeria | 2015 (1), 2017 (2), **2019** (3), 2025 (3) | 9 |
| 4 | Seydou Keita | Mali | 2002 (1), 2010 (3), 2012 (1), 2013 (3) | 8 |
| 4 | Pierre-Emerick Aubameyang | Gabon | 2012 (3), 2015 (1), 2017 (2), 2025 (1) | 7 |
| 4 | Christopher Katongo | Zambia | 2006 (1), 2008 (2), 2010 (1), **2012** (3) | 7 |
| 4 | Jordan Ayew | Ghana | 2015 (1), 2017 (1), 2019 (2), 2023 (2) | 6 |
| 4 | Gervinho | Ivory Coast | 2006 (1), 2008 (1), 2010 (1), 2012 (3) | 6 |
| 4 | Wilfried Bony | Ivory Coast | 2012 (1), 2013 (1), **2015** (2), 2017 (1) | 5 |

==== Goalscorers in all tournament appearances ====
The following are all the former international players who scored at least once in all of their tournament appearances (at least three appearances).

| No. of tournaments | Player | Country | Years (No. of goals scored) | Total goals |
|---|---|---|---|---|
| 6 | Samuel Eto'o | Cameroon | **2000** (4), **2002** (1), 2004 (1), 2006 (5), 2008 (5), 2010 (2) | 18 |
| 6 | Kalusha Bwalya | Zambia | 1986 (1), 1992 (1), 1994 (1), 1996 (5), 1998 (1), 2000 (1) | 10 |
| 5 | Didier Drogba | Ivory Coast | 2006 (3), 2008 (3), 2010 (1), 2012 (3), 2013 (1) | 11 |
| 5 | Mohamed Salah | Egypt | 2017 (2), 2019 (2), 2021 (2), 2023 (1), 2025 (4) | 11 |
| 4 | Rashidi Yekini | Nigeria | 1988 (1), 1990 (3), 1992 (4), **1994** (5) | 13 |
| 4 | Joel Tiéhi | Ivory Coast | **1992** (1), 1994 (4), 1996 (1), 1998 (4) | 10 |
| 3 | Francileudo Santos | Tunisia | **2004** (4), 2006 (4), 2008 (2) | 10 |
| 3 | Frédéric Kanouté | Mali | 2004 (4), 2008 (1), 2010 (2) | 7 |

==== Highest goalscorers in a single tournament ====
The following players finished as top goalscorer with five or more goals in a single tournament. Bold indicates a winning campaign.

| Goals | Player | Country | Year |
|---|---|---|---|
| 9 | Ndaye Mulamba | Zaire | **1974** |
| 8 | Laurent Pokou | Ivory Coast | 1970 |
| 8 | Vincent Aboubakar | Cameroon | 2021 |
| 7 | Hossam Hassan | Egypt | **1998** |
| 7 | Benni McCarthy | South Africa | 1998 |
| 6 | Hassan El-Shazly | Egypt | 1963 |
| 6 | Laurent Pokou | Ivory Coast | 1968 |
| 5 | Ad-Diba | Egypt | **1957** |
| 5 | Salif Keïta | Mali | 1972 |
| 5 | Rashidi Yekini | Nigeria | **1994** |
| 5 | Kalusha Bwalya | Zambia | 1996 |
| 5 | Shaun Bartlett | South Africa | 2000 |
| 5 | Samuel Eto'o | Cameroon | 2006 |
| 5 | Samuel Eto'o | Cameroon | 2008 |
| 5 | Mohamed Nagy | Egypt | **2010** |
| 5 | Odion Ighalo | Nigeria | 2019 |
| 5 | Emilio Nsue | Equatorial Guinea | 2023 |
| 5 | Brahim Díaz | Morocco | **2025** |

==== Top goalscorers in multiple tournaments ====
The following players finished as the top goalscorer in at least two different tournaments.

| Indicates the top goalscorer was shared with other players. |

| Player | Country | Years | Goals |
|---|---|---|---|
| Laurent Pokou | Ivory Coast | 1968 | 6 |
| Laurent Pokou | Ivory Coast | 1970 | 8 |
| Segun Odegbami | Nigeria | 1978 | 3 |
| Segun Odegbami | Nigeria | **1980** | 3 |
| Roger Milla | Cameroon | 1986 | 4 |
| Roger Milla | Cameroon | **1988** | 2 |
| Rashidi Yekini | Nigeria | 1992 | 4 |
| Rashidi Yekini | Nigeria | **1994** | 5 |
| Patrick Mboma | Cameroon | **2002** | 3 |
| Patrick Mboma | Cameroon | 2004 | 4 |
| Samuel Eto'o | Cameroon | 2006 | 5 |
| Samuel Eto'o | Cameroon | 2008 | 5 |

== Appearances ==
=== Most tournament appearances ===
The following players appeared in at least six different AFCON tournaments:

| No. of tournaments | Player | Country | Years |
|---|---|---|---|
| 8 | Rigobert Song | Cameroon | 1996, 1998, 2000, 2002, 2004, 2006, 2008, 2010 |
| 8 | Ahmed Hassan | Egypt | 1996, 1998, 2000, 2002, 2004, 2006, 2008, 2010 |
| 8 | André Ayew | Ghana | 2008, 2010, 2012, 2015, 2017, 2019, 2021, 2023 |
| 8 | Youssef Msakni | Tunisia | 2010, 2012, 2013, 2015, 2017, 2019, 2021, 2023 |
| 7 | Geremi Njitap | Cameroon | 1998, 2000, 2002, 2004, 2006, 2008, 2010 |
| 7 | Boubacar Barry | Ivory Coast | 2002, 2006, 2008, 2010, 2012, 2013, 2015 |
| 7 | Max Gradel | Ivory Coast | 2012, 2013, 2015, 2017, 2019, 2021, 2023 |
| 7 | Siaka Tiéné | Ivory Coast | 2002, 2006, 2008, 2010, 2012, 2013, 2015 |
| 7 | Kolo Touré | Ivory Coast | 2002, 2006, 2008, 2010, 2012, 2013, 2015 |
| 7 | Essam El Hadary | Egypt | 1998, 2000, 2002, 2006, 2008, 2010, 2017 |
| 7 | Hossam Hassan | Egypt | 1986, 1988, 1992, 1998, 2000, 2002, 2006 |
| 7 | Asamoah Gyan | Ghana | 2008, 2010, 2012, 2013, 2015, 2017, 2019 |
| 7 | Seidou Keita | Mali | 2002, 2004, 2008, 2010, 2012, 2013, 2015 |
| 6 | Rabah Madjer | Algeria | 1980, 1982, 1984, 1986, 1990, 1992 |
| 6 | Riyad Mahrez | Algeria | 2015, 2017, 2019, 2021, 2023, 2025 |
| 6 | Aïssa Mandi | Algeria | 2015, 2017, 2019, 2021, 2023, 2025 |
| 6 | Raïs M'Bolhi | Algeria | 2013, 2015, 2017, 2019, 2021, 2023 |
| 6 | Mahieddine Meftah | Algeria | 1990, 1992, 1996, 1998, 2000, 2002 |
| 6 | Islam Slimani | Algeria | 2013, 2015, 2017, 2019, 2021, 2023 |
| 6 | Bertrand Traoré | Burkina Faso | 2012, 2015, 2017, 2021, 2023, 2025 |
| 6 | Samuel Eto'o | Cameroon | 2000, 2002, 2004, 2006, 2008, 2010 |
| 6 | Salomon Kalou | Ivory Coast | 2008, 2010, 2012, 2013, 2015, 2017 |
| 6 | Yaya Touré | Ivory Coast | 2006, 2008, 2010, 2012, 2013, 2015 |
| 6 | Didier Zokora | Ivory Coast | 2002, 2006, 2008, 2010, 2012, 2013 |
| 6 | Abdel-Zaher El-Saqqa | Egypt | 1998, 2000, 2002, 2004, 2006, 2010 |
| 6 | Hany Ramzy | Egypt | 1992, 1994, 1996, 1998, 2000, 2002 |
| 6 | Bruno Ecuele Manga | Gabon | 2010, 2012, 2015, 2017, 2021, 2025 |
| 6 | Jordan Ayew | Ghana | 2012, 2015, 2017, 2019, 2021, 2023 |
| 6 | Soumbeïla Diakité | Mali | 2008, 2010, 2012, 2013, 2015, 2017 |
| 6 | Noureddine Naybet | Morocco | 1992, 1998, 2000, 2002, 2004, 2006 |
| 6 | Nwankwo Kanu | Nigeria | 2000, 2002, 2004, 2006, 2008, 2010 |
| 6 | Sadio Mané | Senegal | 2015, 2017, 2019, 2022, 2024, 2025 |
| 6 | Riadh Bouazizi | Tunisia | 1996, 1998, 2000, 2002, 2004, 2006 |
| 6 | Kaies Ghodhbane | Tunisia | 1996, 1998, 2000, 2002, 2004, 2006 |
| 6 | Aymen Mathlouthi | Tunisia | 2008, 2010, 2012, 2013, 2015, 2017 |
| 6 | Kalusha Bwalya | Zambia | 1986, 1992, 1994, 1996, 1998, 2000 |
| 6 | Kennedy Mweene | Zambia | 2006, 2008, 2010, 2012, 2013, 2015 |
| 6 | Stoppila Sunzu | Zambia | 2010, 2012, 2013, 2015, 2023, 2025 |

=== Player records ===
==== Youngest player ====
Joseph Odoi was 15 years and 164 days old when he played for Ghana in 1984 against Nigeria on 5 March 1984.

==== Oldest player ====
Essam El Hadary was 44 years and 21 days old when he played for Egypt in the final against Cameroon on 5 February 2017.

==== Most matches played ====
Rigobert Song (for Cameroon, between 1998 and 2010) and André Ayew (for Ghana, between 2008 and 2023) each played in a record 36 matches at the tournament.

==== Most titles won ====
| No. of titles | Player | Country | Years |
|---|---|---|---|
| 4 | Essam El Hadary | Egypt | 1998, 2006, 2008, 2010 |
| 4 | Ahmed Hassan | Egypt | 1998, 2006, 2008, 2010 |

== Coaching ==
=== Titles won ===
==== Most titles won as coach ====
- 3, Charles Gyamfi (as manager of Ghana in 1963, 1965 and 1982)
- 3, Hassan Shehata (as manager of Egypt in 2006, 2008 and 2010)

==== Most consecutive titles won as coach ====
- 3, Hassan Shehata (as manager of Egypt in 2006, 2008 and 2010)

==== Coaches who retained title ====
- 2 times, Hassan Shehata (as manager of Egypt in 2008 and 2010)
- 1 time, Charles Gyamfi (as manager of Ghana in 1965)

==== Coaches who won titles with multiple teams ====
- (France) Hervé Renard (as manager of Zambia in 2012 and Ivory Coast in 2015)

==== Won title as both player and coach ====
- Mahmoud El-Gohary (in 1959 as a player and 1998 as a manager, both with Egypt)
- Stephen Keshi (in 1994 as a player and in 2013 as a manager, both with Nigeria)

==== Appearance in final as both player and coach ====
- Emerse Faé (lost 2006 final as a player, won 2023 final as a manager, both with Ivory Coast)
- Aliou Cissé (lost 2002 final as a player, lost 2019 final and won 2021 final as a manager, all with Senegal)
- Mahmoud El-Gohary (won 1959 final as a player and won 1998 final as a manager, both with Egypt)
- Stephen Keshi (lost both 1984 final and 1988 final and won 1994 final as a player; and won 2013 final as a manager, all with Nigeria)
- Walid Regragui (lost 2004 final as a player; won 2025 final as a manager, both with Morocco)

==== Most nations coached in tournament ====
- 6, (France) Claude Le Roy (managed Cameroon in 1986 and 1988, Senegal in 1990 and 1992, Ghana in 2008, DR Congo in 2006 and 2013, Congo in 2015 and Togo in 2017)

==== Most tournament appearances as coach ====
- 9, (France) Claude Le Roy (as manager of Cameroon in 1986 and 1988, Senegal in 1990 and 1992, Ghana in 2008, DR Congo in 2006 and 2013, Congo in 2015 and Togo in 2017)

=== Titles won by foreign coaches ===
==== First foreign coach to win tournament ====
- (Hungary) Pál Titkos (as manager of Egypt in 1959)

==== Most titles won as foreign coach ====
- 2, (France) Hervé Renard (as manager of Zambia in 2012 and Ivory Coast in 2015)

==== Foreign coaches who also won other major tournaments ====
- Roger Lemerre (won 2004 AFCON as manager of Tunisia, and won Euro 2000 and 2001 Confederations Cup as manager of France)

==== Country with most titles by coaches from there ====
- 5 managers, France

== Most tournaments hosted ==
| No. of times hosted | Country | Year(s) | Wins as host |
|---|---|---|---|
| 5 | Egypt | 1959, 1974, 1986, 2006, 2019 | 3/5 |
| 4 | Ghana | 1963, 1978, 2000*, 2008 | 2/4 |
| 3 | Ethiopia | 1962, 1968, 1976 | 1/3 |
| 3 | Tunisia | 1965, 1994, 2004 | 1/3 |
| 2 | Sudan | 1957, 1970 | 1/2 |
| 2 | Cameroon | 1972, 2021 | 0/2 |
| 2 | Nigeria | 1980, 2000* | 1/2 |
| 2 | Ivory Coast | 1984, 2023 | 1/2 |
| 2 | South Africa | 1996, 2013 | 1/2 |
| 2 | Equatorial Guinea | 2012*, 2015 | 0/2 |
| 2 | Gabon | 2012*, 2017 | 0/2 |
| 2 | Morocco | 1988, 2025 | 1/2 |
1
| 1 | Libya | 1982 | 0/1 |
| 1 | Algeria | 1990 | 1/1 |
| 1 | Senegal | 1992 | 0/1 |
| 1 | Burkina Faso | 1998 | 0/1 |
| 1 | Mali | 2002 | 0/1 |
| 1 | Angola | 2010 | 0/1 |
| 1 | Kenya | 2027* | 0/1 |
| 1 | Tanzania | 2027* | 0/1 |
| 1 | Uganda | 2027* | 0/1 |

* Co-hosts
in Italic : Upcoming tournament

== Other team records ==
- Ten nations have won the tournament as hosts:
  - Egypt (1959, 1986 and 2006)
  - Ghana (1963 and 1978)
  - Ethiopia (1962)
  - Sudan (1970)
  - Nigeria (1980)
  - Algeria (1990)
  - South Africa (1996)
  - Tunisia (2004)
  - Ivory Coast (2023)
  - Morocco (2025)
- Egypt (in 1957), Ghana (in 1963) and South Africa (in 1996) are the only teams to have won the tournament in their debut appearance.
- Sudan (in 1957), Ghana (in 1963), Libya (in 1982), South Africa (in 1996) and Equatorial Guinea (in 2012) are the five teams to have hosted the tournament in their debut appearance.
- Ghana (in 1963) and South Africa (in 1996) are the only teams to have hosted and won the tournament in their debut appearance.
- Egypt became the first ever team to win the Africa Cup of Nations finals in 1957, and also the first team to retain the title in 1959.
- Egypt has played the most matches in the tournament finals, with 118.
- Egypt has participated in the most tournaments, with 27.
- Egypt has the most points from matches played at the tournament finals, with 218.
- Egypt is the only team to win three consecutive Africa Cup of Nations finals (in 2006, 2008 and 2010).
- Egypt has appeared in the most final matches of the tournament, with ten appearances and seven wins.
- Egypt had a penalty shoot-out winning streak of six, winning every shoot-out since their 5–4 win to Cameroon in the 1986 final. This streak ended on 6 February 2022, when Egypt lost 4–2 on penalties 35 years later to Senegal.
- Tunisia is the team with the most consecutive appearances at the Africa Cup of Nations, with seventeen from 1994 to 2025.
- Cameroon (in 2002) and Ivory Coast (in 2012) share the record for most clean sheets in a single tournament, with six each; they are also the only sides to reach the final of the tournament and not concede a single goal.
- Nigeria has placed on the podium a record seventeen times at the tournament (three gold medals, five silver medals and nine bronze medals).
- In 2017, Egypt set a new record of 24 consecutive Africa Cup of Nations matches played without defeat, dating back to their last tournament appearance in 2010. During this run, Egypt also reached a record nine consecutive wins in AFCON matches after beating Ghana in the 2010 final, while becoming the first team to win three consecutive AFCON titles. The unbeaten run came to an end on 5 February 2017, after Egypt lost 1–2 to Cameroon in the 2017 final.

=== Egypt's run ===
| No. | Date | Opponent | Score | Result |
|---|---|---|---|---|
| 1. | 3 February 2004 | Cameroon | 0–0 | Draw |
| 2. | 20 January 2006 | Libya | 3–0 | Win |
| 3. | 24 January 2006 | Morocco | 0–0 | Draw |
| 4. | 28 January 2006 | Ivory Coast | 3–1 | Win |
| 5. | 3 February 2006 | DR Congo | 4–1 | Win |
| 6. | 7 February 2006 | Senegal | 2–1 | Win |
| 7. | 10 February 2006 | Ivory Coast | 0–0 (4–2 p) | Draw |
| 8. | 22 January 2008 | Cameroon | 4–2 | Win |
| 9. | 26 January 2008 | Sudan | 3–0 | Win |
| 10. | 30 January 2008 | Zambia | 1–1 | Draw |
| 11. | 4 February 2008 | Angola | 2–1 | Win |
| 12. | 7 February 2008 | Ivory Coast | 4–1 | Win |
| 13. | 10 February 2008 | Cameroon | 1–0 | Win |
| 14. | 12 January 2010 | Nigeria | 3–1 | Win |
| 15. | 16 January 2010 | Mozambique | 2–0 | Win |
| 16. | 20 January 2010 | Benin | 2–0 | Win |
| 17. | 25 January 2010 | Cameroon | 3–1 | Win |
| 18. | 28 January 2010 | Algeria | 4–0 | Win |
| 19. | 31 January 2010 | Ghana | 1–0 | Win |
| 20. | 17 January 2017 | Mali | 0–0 | Draw |
| 21. | 21 January 2017 | Uganda | 1–0 | Win |
| 22. | 25 January 2017 | Ghana | 1–0 | Win |
| 23. | 29 January 2017 | Morocco | 1–0 | Win |
| 24. | 1 February 2017 | Burkina Faso | 1–1 (4–3 p) | Draw |

=== Consecutive championships ===
Teams that have won the Africa Cup of Nations consecutively and have become two-time champions (two consecutive titles) or three-time champions (three consecutive titles).

| Team | Two championships | Three championships |
|---|---|---|
| Egypt | 1: (1957, 1959*) | 1: (2006*, 2008, 2010) |
| Ghana | 1: (1963*, 1965) | — |
| Cameroon | 1: (2000, 2002) | — |

* indicate tournament hosts

== Debut of teams in qualification ==
| Year | Debutants in qualification | Total |
|---|---|---|
| 1957 | No qualification round | 0 |
| 1959 | No qualification round | 0 |
| 1962 | Ethiopia; Ghana; Morocco; Nigeria; Kenya; Tunisia; Uganda; Zanzibar | 8 |
| 1963 | Egypt (as United Arab Republic); Guinea; Sudan | 3 |
| 1965 | DR Congo (as Congo-Léopoldville); Ivory Coast; Mali; Senegal | 4 |
| 1968 | Algeria (Republic of Upper Volta) Burkina Faso (as Upper Volta); Cameroon; Congo (as Congo-Brazzaville); Liberia; Libya; Mauritius; Tanzania; Togo | 9 |
| 1970 | Niger; Sierra Leone; Somalia; Zambia | 4 |
| 1972 | Benin (as Dahomey); Gabon; Madagascar | 3 |
| 1974 | Central African Republic; Lesotho | 2 |
| 1976 | Burundi; Gambia; Malawi | 3 |
| 1978 | None | 0 |
| 1980 | Mauritania | 1 |
| 1982 | Angola; Equatorial Guinea; Mozambique; Rwanda; Zimbabwe | 5 |
| 1984 | Swaziland | 1 |
| 1986 | None | 0 |
| 1988 | None | 0 |
| 1990 | Seychelles | 1 |
| 1992 | Chad | 1 |
| 1994 | Botswana; Cape Verde; Guinea-Bissau; South Africa | 4 |
| 1996 | Namibia | 1 |
| 1998 | None | 0 |
| 2000 | Djibouti; Eritrea; São Tomé and Príncipe | 3 |
| 2002 | None | 0 |
| 2004 | None | 0 |
| 2006 | None | 0 |
| 2008 | None | 0 |
| 2010 | Comoros | 1 |
| 2012 | None | 0 |
| 2013 | None | 0 |
| 2015 | South Sudan | 1 |
| 2017 | None | 0 |
| 2019 | None | 0 |
| 2021 | None | 0 |
| 2023 | None | 0 |
| 2025 | None | 0 |
