= 1978 African Cup of Nations qualification =

This page details the qualification of the 1978 African Cup of Nations

== Qualifying tournament ==
=== Preliminary round ===
Team 1	Agg.	Team 2	1st leg	2nd leg
Malawi	3–4	Mauritius	1–1	2–3

24 October 1976

Malawi	1–1	Mauritius
Phiri		L'Enflé

Lilongwe
28 January 1977

Mauritius	3–2	Malawi
Chundunsing; Imbert; L'Enflé		Phiri ?

Stade George V, Curepipe
Attendance: 50,000

Mauritius won 4–3 on aggregate.

=== First round ===
Team 1	Agg.	Team 2	1st leg	2nd leg
Algeria	5–3	Kenya	4–1	1–2
Sierra Leone	1–3	Nigeria	1–1	0–2
Mauritius	2–4	Ethiopia	2–3	0–1
Guinea	5–0	Libya	3–0	2–0
Senegal	3–1	Togo	2–1	1–0
Egypt	4–5	Tunisia	2–2	2–3
Cameroon	2–4	Congo	2–0	0–4
Upper Volta	1–5	Ivory Coast	0–1	1–4
Mali	w/o	Niger	—	—
Uganda	w/o	Tanzania	—	—
Zambia	w/o	Sudan	—	—
Gabon	Bye			

17 February 1977

Algeria	4–1	Kenya
Baïleche 5', 69'; Betrouni 12'; Tlemçani 45' (pen.)		Ghazalle 37'

5 July Stadium, Algiers
13 March 1977

Kenya	2–1	Algeria
Lukoye 28'; Ochieng 40'		Ighili 21'

Mombasa Municipal Stadium, Mombasa

Algeria won 5–3 on aggregate.

17 February 1977

Sierra Leone	1–1	Nigeria

Freetown
13 March 1977

Nigeria	2–0	Sierra Leone
Odegbami

Surulere Stadium, Lagos

Nigeria won 3–1 on aggregate.

17 February 1977

Mauritius	2–3	Ethiopia
Chundunsing ?

Stade George V, Curepipe
13 March 1977

Ethiopia	1–0	Mauritius

Addis Ababa Stadium, Addis Ababa

Ethiopia won 4–2 on aggregate.

13 March 1977

Guinea	3–0	Libya

Stade du 28 Septembre, Conakry
25 March 1977

Libya	0–2	Guinea

March 28 Stadium, Benghazi
Referee: ... Setali (Morocco)

Guinea won 5–0 on aggregate.

13 March 1977

Senegal	2–1	Togo

Stade Demba Diop, Dakar
26 March 1977

Togo	0–1	Senegal

Lomé

Senegal won 3–1 on aggregate.

13 March 1977

Egypt	2–2	Tunisia
Gaafar 42' (pen.); Khalil 57'		Agrebi 25'; Akid 70'

Cairo International Stadium, Cairo
27 April 1977

Tunisia	3–2	Egypt
Akid 10'; Lahzami 17'; Dhiab 55'		El Khatib 37' (pen.); Shehata 82'

Stade El Menzah, Tunis

Tunisia won 5–4 on aggregate.

13 March 1977

Cameroon	2–0	Congo
M'Bida 2'; Milla 45+1'

Ahmadou Ahidjo Stadium, Yaoundé
5 June 1977

Congo	4–0	Cameroon
N'Domba; Bahamboula; Mounoundzi (pen.)

Stade de la Révolution, Brazzaville

Congo won 4–2 on aggregate.

20 March 1977

Upper Volta	0–1	Ivory Coast

Stade Municipal, Ouagadougou
27 March 1977

Ivory Coast	4–1	Upper Volta

Stade Félix Houphouët-Boigny, Abidjan

Ivory Coast won 5–1 on aggregate, but later were disqualified.

Mali	w/o	Niger

Mali had a walkover to the next round, but later were disqualified.

Uganda	w/o	Tanzania

Uganda had a walkover to the next round.

Zambia	w/o	Sudan

Zambia had a walkover to the next round.

=== Second round ===
Team 1	Agg.	Team 2	1st leg	2nd leg
Algeria	2–2 (5–6 p)	Zambia	2–0	0–2
Senegal	3–4	Nigeria	3–1	0–3
Ethiopia	1–2	Uganda	0–0	1–2
Mali	1–2^{1}	Ivory Coast	1–0	0–2
Congo	6–5	Gabon	3–2	3–3
Tunisia	5–3	Guinea	3–0	2–3

^1 Ivory Coast and Mali were both disqualified: Upper Volta, who lost to Ivory Coast in the first round, were given a place in the finals.

9 June 1977

Algeria	2–0	Zambia
Ali Messaoud 2'; Ighili 74'

5 July Stadium, Algiers
26 June 1977

Zambia	2–0 (a.e.t.)	Algeria
Chitalu 33', 52'
Penalties
	6–5

Independence Stadium, Lusaka
Referee: Gratian Matovu (Tanzania)

Zambia won 6–5 in penalty shootout after 2–2 on aggregate.

12 June 1977

Senegal	3–1	Nigeria

Stade Demba Diop, Dakar
26 June 1977

Nigeria	3–0	Senegal
Atuegbu; Odegbami ?

Surulere Stadium, Lagos

Nigeria won 4–3 on aggregate.

12 June 1977

Ethiopia	0–0	Uganda

Addis Ababa Stadium, Addis Ababa
26 June 1977

Uganda	2–1	Ethiopia
Semwanga 7' (pen.); Kirunda 89'		Goal

Nakivubo Stadium, Kampala

Uganda won 2–1 on aggregate.

19 June 1977

Mali	1–0	Ivory Coast

Stade Mamadou Konaté, Bamako
17 July 1977

Ivory Coast	2–0	Mali

Stade Félix Houphouët-Boigny, Abidjan

Both teams were disqualified: Ivory Coast for using an ineligible player in the second leg, and Mali after stadium security and police assaulted the match officials during the first leg. Upper Volta, who lost to Ivory Coast in the first round, were given a place in the finals.

17 July 1977

Congo	3–2	Gabon
Moukila 44', 45+1'; Lakou 45'		Ndjambou 11'; Bourdette 47'

Stade de la Révolution, Brazzaville
31 July 1977

Gabon	3–3	Congo
Manon 36', 89'; Dimonékéné 34' (o.g.)		Bahamboula 26'; Nganga-Mwivi 53', 76'

Stade Omar Bongo, Libreville

Congo won 6–5 on aggregate.

2 October 1977

Tunisia	3–0	Guinea
Labidi 19'; Dhiab 38', 48'

Stade El Menzah, Tunis
16 October 1977

Guinea	3–2	Tunisia
Souleymane ?		Agrebi 17'; Dhiab 25'

Stade du 28 Septembre, Conakry

Tunisia won 5–3 on aggregate.

== Qualified teams ==
The 8 qualified teams are:

- Ghana (hosts)
- Nigeria
- Zambia
- Upper Volta
- Uganda
- Tunisia
- Morocco (holders)
- Congo
