= Addae =

Addae is both a given name and a surname. Notable people with the name include:

- Addae Kyenkyehene, Ghanaian footballer
- Alonzo Addae (born 1997), Canadian football player
- Bright Addae (born 1992), Ghanaian footballer
- Christopher Addae (born 1963), Ghanaian politician
- Jahleel Addae (born 1990), American football player
- Kwodwo Addae (born 1995), Ghanaian footballer
