= Jacques Mamounoubala =

Congolese footballer (1953–2016)

Personal information
- Full name: Jacques Mamounoubala
- Date of birth: 2 April 1953
- Place of birth: Brazzaville, French Equatorial Africa
- Date of death: 28 May 2016 (aged 63)
- Place of death: Brazzaville, Congo–Brazzaville
- Position: Left winger

Senior career*
Years	Team	Apps	(Gls)
1972–1973	Avenir du Rail Ouenzé		
1974–1985	CARA Brazzaville		
Total		77	(7)

International career
1978–1981	Congo		(2)
- * Club domestic league appearances and goals

Jacques Mamounoubala (2 April 1953 – 28 May 2016) was a Congolese footballer. Nicknamed "La Mama", he played as a left winger for CARA Brazzaville throughout the 1970s and the 1980s. He also represented his home country of Congo–Brazzaville at the 1978 African Cup of Nations.

== Club career ==
Mamounoubala began his career playing for Avenir du Rail in the early 1970s before joining CARA Brazzaville in 1974. In his inaugural season with the club, he won the 1974 African Cup of Champions Clubs. His style of play was characterized by his runs along the touchline usually resulting in crosses or shots towards the goal. He continued playing for the club into the 1980s alongside other players such as Ange Ngapy, Médard Ngakosso and Guy Armand Nkéoua until his retirement in 1985. During his tenure with the club, he was the top scorer of the 1980 Congo Ligue 1.

== International career ==
Mamounoubala was first called up to represent Congo–Brazzaville for the 1978 African Cup of Nations following failing to qualify for the 1976 edition. Despite the early elimination of Les Diables Rouges in the group stage, Mamounoubala had the record of being the only Congolese goalscorer, scoring in the 3–1 loss against Uganda on 6 March 1978. His second goal came in a friendly against Niger on 5 October 1980 in celebration of the centennial of his home city of Brazzaville.

== Personal life ==
Mamounoubala died on 28 May 2016 following years of health problems.
