= Willie Klutse =

Ghanaian footballer

Personal information
- Full name: Willie Klutse

International career
Years	Team	Apps	(Gls)
1978–1980	Ghana		

Willie Klutse is a former Ghanaian international football player. He was in the Ghana squad that won the 1978 African Cup of Nations held in Ghana, and scored in the match against Nigeria. He was also selected for the Ghana squad that faced Guinea in the 1978 FIFA World Cup qualifying rounds, but did not appear in the match.

== Honours ==
- 1978 African Cup of Nations - champions
