= Hubert Hien =

Burkinabé footballer

Personal information
- Place of birth: Upper Volta
- Position: Midfielder

Senior career*
Years	Team	Apps	(Gls)
–	Rail Club du Kadiogo	–	(–)

International career
1978	Upper Volta	1	(0)
- * Club domestic league appearances and goals

Hubert Hien is an Upper Volta football midfielder who played for Upper Volta in the 1978 African Cup of Nations, where he scored the team's first ever goal in the competition. He also played for Rail Club du Kadiogo.
