= Ashok Chundunsing =

Mauritian football manager

Personal information
- Full name: Bhardwazing "Ashok" Chundunsing
- Place of birth: Mauritius

International career
| Years | Team | Apps | (Gls) |
| 1973–1979 | Mauritius | 25 | (5) |

Managerial career
- 1990–1998: Sunrise Flacq United
- 1998: Mauritius
- 2007–2008: Mauritius
- 2009: Curepipe Starlight SC

Ashok Chundunsing was the coach of the Mauritius national football team in 1998 and 2007-2008. He was also the coach of the Sunrise Flacq United in the 1990s, where he enjoyed success with several league titles. He was dismissed from the national team in September 2008 following the poor performance of the team and also because of a five-game suspension he received for arguing with a referee during the match against Cape Verde. He then accepted the post of coach of Curepipe Starlight SC.

== Career statistics ==
=== International goals ===
| # | Date | Venue | Opponent | Score | Result | Competition |
|---|---|---|---|---|---|---|
| 1. | 1 July 1976 | Mahé, Seychelles | Kenya | 3–4 | Loss | 1976 Indian Ocean Tournament |
| 2. | 31 October 1976 | Stade George V, Curepipe, Mauritius | Malawi | 3–2 | Win | 1978 African Cup of Nations qualification |
| 3. | 20 March 1977 | Stade George V, Curepipe, Mauritius | Ethiopia | 2–3 | Loss | 1978 African Cup of Nations qualification |
| 4. | 18 September 1977 | Mahé, Seychelles | Réunion | 2–0 | Win | 1977 Indian Ocean Tournament |
| 5. | 13 May 1979 | Stade George V, Curepipe, Mauritius | Lesotho | 2–3 | Loss | 1980 Summer Olympics qualification |
Correct as of 6 April 2021
