= Bizwell Phiri =

Zambian footballer and manager

Personal information
- Place of birth: Zambia
- Date of death: 1994
- Place of death: South Africa
- Position: Defender

Senior career*
Years	Team	Apps	(Gls)
1988	Jomo Cosmos		

International career
1978–1980	Zambia	4	(2)

Managerial career
- 1992–1994: Bush Bucks
- * Club domestic league appearances and goals

Bizwell Phiri (died 1994) was a Zambian football player and manager.

== Career ==
Phiri played as a defender for Zambia in the 1978 African Cup of Nations, where he scored a goal against Upper Volta. He joined South African side Jomo Cosmos F.C. in 1988.

After he retired from playing, Phiri became a football coach. In 1992, he was appointed manager of Bush Bucks F.C., and led the club to the 1993 Coca-Cola Challenge Cup title.

== Personal ==
In 1994, Phiri was killed in an automobile accident in South Africa.
