= Willie Phiri =

Zambian footballer and manager (1953-2011)

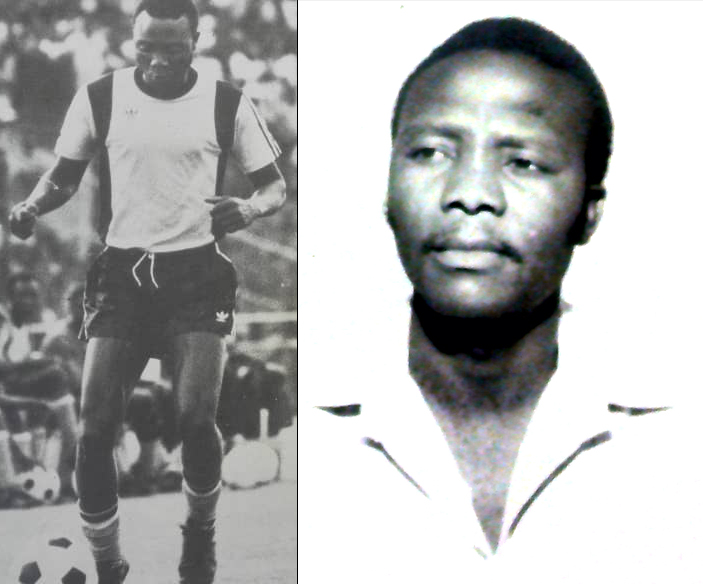

Personal information
- Full name: Willie Phiri
- Date of birth: 3 June 1953
- Place of birth: Northern Rhodesia
- Date of death: 2 June 2011 (aged 57)
- Place of death: Chingola, Zambia
- Position: Midfielder

Senior career*
Years	Team	Apps	(Gls)
1969–1983	Nchanga Rangers		

International career
1973–1980	Zambia		

Managerial career
- 1984–1988: Nchanga Rangers
- 1989–1991: PG Notwane FC
- 1991–1993: Nchanga Rangers
- * Club domestic league appearances and goals

Willie Phiri (3 June 1953 – 2 June 2011) was a Zambia international football midfielder and manager.

== Career ==
Born in Northern Rhodesia, Phiri played club football for local side Nchanga Rangers F.C. for nearly fifteen years.

Phiri made several appearances for the senior Zambia national football team, including eleven FIFA World Cup qualifying matches, and played at the 1974 and 1978 African Cup of Nations finals.

After retiring from playing football in 1983, Phiri became a coach. He was appointed manager of Nchanga Rangers F.C. in 1984.

== Personal ==
Born to policeman Mulimakwenda Phiri. Willie Phiri's father hoped for better ambitions for his first-born son and supported his education more than a fledgling soccer career. If anything Phiri senior opposed his sons love for the global game seeing it as more of a distraction towards attaining a better and secure future. However it was Phiri seniors friend Damiano Mutale who betrayed him and subsequently unearthed one of Zambia's best ever midfield players. Damiano had been observant of the young Phiris talents as he played amongst his friends. Convinced of the possibility of a real talent being unexposed, he whisked young Willie Phiri off to see the local towns football club Nchanga Rangers manager at the time. The manager gave him the opportunity for a trial that he excelled in and at the age of 15 became one of the youngest members of the club and played in a midfield role.

Phiri later on became a local legend through the club that he later managed. In January 1993, Phiri got involved in a road traffic accident that left him requiring the use of a wheelchair. His love for the sport remained consistent throughout his life & through his dedication to the Nchanga Rangers and the national teams accolades. Phiri was known for his free kicks, banana shots and the dribble known as "walking walking.”

Willie Phiri died the day before his 58th birthday. Willie Phiri was survived by wife Alice Ivy Phiri and five children, two boys Willie Phiri Jnr and Fumbani Phiri and three girls Michelle Phiri-Kazala, Tracy Phiri-Bath and Karen Mukanzo-Phiri.
