= Sam Musenze =

Ugandan footballer

Personal information
- Place of birth: Uganda
- Position: Defender

International career
Years	Team	Apps	(Gls)
1976–1978	Uganda	1	(0)

Sam Musenze is a Uganda football defender who played for Uganda in the 1978 African Cup of Nations.

Musenze also represented Uganda in 1978 World Cup qualifiers.
