= Moussa Kanfideni =

Nigerien footballer

Moussa Kanfideni is a Nigerien footballer of the 1970s and 1980s. He scored at least 5 goals for the nation in that time.

A midfielder, Kanfideni was ever-present in Niger's 1978 and 1982 World Cup qualifying campaigns, with the latter qualifiers being Niger's most notable World Cup qualifying runs to date. He captained the Niger side during the 1980s.
