= Addae Kyenkyehene =

Ghanaian footballer

Kwadwo Addai Kyenkyehene
Personal information
- Date of birth: 14 November 1955 (age 70)
- Place of birth: Duase, Ashanti Region, Ghana
- Height: 6 ft 0 in (1.83 m)
- Position: Midfielder

Senior career*
Years	Team	Apps	(Gls)
–	Asante Kotoko	-	(-)

International career
1986	Ghana	3	(0)
- * Club domestic league appearances and goals

Addai Kyenkyehene is a Ghanaian football midfielder who played for Ghana in the 1978 African Cup of Nations. He also played for Asante Kotoko.
