= Jiří Starosta =

Czech football manager

Personal information
- Date of birth: 22 April 1922
- Place of birth: Czechoslovakia
- Date of death: 15 February 2012 (aged 89)
- Position: Midfielder

Managerial career
- Years: Team
- 1959: Ethiopia
- Sudan
- Cuba
- 1984: Vítkovice

Jiří Starosta (22. April 1922 in Muglinov – 15 February 2012) was a Czech football manager who is last known to have managed Vítkovice.

== Career ==
In 1959, Starosta was appointed manager of Ethiopia. After that, he was appointed manager of Sudan. After that, he was appointed manager of Cuba. In 1984, Starosta was appointed manager of Czech side Vítkovice.
