= Paul Manon =

Anguillan footballer (born 2008)

Personal information
- Date of birth: 15 January 1944
- Place of birth: Libreville, French Equatorial Africa (present-day Gabon)
- Date of death: 30 September 2001 (aged 57)
- Place of death: Gabon
- Height: 1.71 m (5 ft 7 in)
- Position: Midfielder

Senior career*
Years	Team	Apps	(Gls)
1960–1965	Red Star Libreville		
1965–1966	Tours		
1966–1969	Stade de Reims	93	(8)
1969–1971	Gazélec Ajaccio		
1971–1975	Boulogne		
197?–1980	FC 105 Libreville		

International career
1961–1976	Gabon	2+	(0+)
- * Club domestic league appearances and goals

Paul Manon (15 January 1944 – 30 September 2001) was a Gabonese footballer who played as a midfielder.

== Early life ==
Manon was born in the Glass district of Libreville on 15 January 1944. His father worked as an accountant for the Société du Haut-Ogooué.

== Club career ==
Manon started his career with Red Star Libreville in 1960. In 1965, he took the advice of Gabon national team manager André Capelier, and flew to France to join Championnat de France Amateur side Tours, aged 21. He quickly made a name for himself in France, catching the attention of several French clubs, joining French Division 1 side Stade de Reims in 1966.

At Reims, he made 26 appearances in his first season, as the club were relegated to the French Division 2. In total, he made 105 appearances for the club between 1966 and 1969, scoring nine goals. After leaving Reims, he joined Gazélec Ajaccio, before playing for Boulogne between 1971 and 1975. Overall, he played nearly 260 matches in the French Division 2.

During the late 1970s, he returned to Gabon, eventually signing for FC 105 Libreville, where he retired in 1980.

== International career ==
In 1961, Manon represented the Gabon national team at the Friendship Games in Abidjan. He later represented Gabon at the 1976 Central African Games, as well during qualification for the 1972, 1974, and 1976 African Cup of Nations.

== Personal life and death ==
His son, Régis Manon, was also a footballer.

Manon died in Gabon on 30 September 2001, at the age of 57, following a heart attack.

== Legacy ==
In 2015, the Supercoupe du Gabon was named the Coupe Paul Manon.
