= Joseph Mounoundzi =

Congolese footballer

Personal information
- Place of birth: Republic of the Congo

Senior career*
Years	Team	Apps	(Gls)
–	Congo Brazzaville	-	(-)

International career
1976–1978	Congo	4	(1)
- * Club domestic league appearances and goals

Joseph Mounoundzi is a Congolese football player who played for the People's Republic of the Congo in the 1978 African Cup of Nations.
