= Godfrey Kisitu =

Ugandan footballer (died 1993)

Personal information
- Place of birth: Uganda
- Date of death: 11 March 1993
- Position: Midfielder

International career
Years	Team	Apps	(Gls)
1978–1984	Uganda	5	(2)

Godfrey Kisitu (died 11 March 1993) is a Uganda midfielder who played for Uganda in the 1978 African Cup of Nations.
