= Godwin Iwelumo =

Nigerian footballer

Godwin Iwelumo is a former football player for the Nigerian national team (1978) and ACB Lagos. He is currently running his own football training academy in the Lake Norman area near Mooresville, North Carolina, USA.

He also coached Hendersonville High School soccer in Hendersonville, Tennessee.

Iwelumo scored for Nigeria on his debut, a 7–0 victory in a friendly against Benin on 14 February 1977.
