= Karim Abdul Razak =

Ghanaian football manager and former player

Personal information
- Full name: Karim Abdul Razak Tanko
- Date of birth: 18 April 1956 (age 70)
- Place of birth: Kumasi, Ghana
- Position: Midfielder

Senior career*
Years	Team	Apps	(Gls)
1972–1975	Cornerstones		
1975–1979	Asante Kotoko	345	(154)
1979–1980	New York Cosmos	3	(0)
1980–1981	Emirates		
1981	Asante Kotoko		
1981–1982	Al Ain		
1982–1985	Arab Contractors		
1985–1988	Asante Kotoko		
1988–1990	Africa Sports		

International career
1975–1987	Ghana	62	(25)

Managerial career
- 1999: Asante Kotoko
- 1999–2000: Dragons de l'Ouémé
- 2000: Ghana (assistant)
- 2000–2002: Stade Malien
- 2003–2004: Asante Kotoko
- 2004–2006: Stade Malien
- 2007–2008: Al-Markhiya
- 2011–2012: Stade Malien
- 2014: Al-Markhiya
- * Club domestic league appearances and goals

Karim Abdul Razak Tanko (Note: Spelling variations of name include Karimu and Abdoul.) (born 18 April 1956) is a Ghanaian football coach and former midfielder. He played for several clubs in the 1970s and 1980s, notably the local club Asante Kotoko and the New York Cosmos in the defunct North American Soccer League (NASL).

Popularly called the "Golden Boy", Razak also played for the Ghana national team, helping it win the 1978 African Cup of Nations. He was named African Footballer of the Year later that year.

Razak, who also played for clubs in the UAE, Egypt and Ivory Coast, was ranked by the Confederation of African Football (CAF) in 2007 as one of the confederation's 30 best footballers of the previous 50 years.

== Early life ==
Razak was born in Kumasi to Alhaji Abdul Karimu and Hajija Ishatu. He studied at Asem Boy's Elementary School. He started his playing career at local youth team football, before moving to Kumasi Cornerstones in 1972.

== Club career ==
In 1975, he moved to Ghana's most successful club, Asante Kotoko. After a four-year spell with Kotoko, during which he became a member of the national team and earned the 1978 African Footballer of the Year award, Razak left Ghana in 1979 for the New York Cosmos of the NASL, where he played alongside former World Cup winners Franz Beckenbauer and Carlos Alberto.

In 1981, after spending almost two years at the New York club, the Ghanaian forward decided to return home, signing with his former club Asante Kotoko. After one year, he moved, this time to Al Ain of UAE, where he spent two seasons. Razak then signed with Arab Contractors of Egypt, where he spent the next two years of his playing career. before returning to Ghana for a third spell with Kotoko. After another five years with the Ghanaian club, Razak moved to Ivorian side Africa Sports of Abidjan, where he retired two years later.

== International career ==
Razak was a member of the Ghana national team that competed at the 1978 African Cup of Nations as hosts of the tournament. He scored two game-winning goals, one against Zambia in the first round, and another one to defeat Tunisia 1–0 in semi-finals. His decisive goal against Tunisia has been referred to as the "Golden Goal". Ghana defeated Uganda in the final, winning their 3rd continental title. In good part due to his effort to help Ghana win the African Cup, Razak was named African Player of the Year months later, becoming the second of three Ghanaian players ever to win the award.

According to a UEFA report, Razak appeared in a total of 62 international matches for Ghana, scoring 25 goals.

== Coaching career ==
After retiring from playing, Razak, who had become a player-coach while at Al Ain, started his coaching career, being in charge of several semi-professional Togolese clubs, before moving to Benin's AS Dragons FC de l'Ouémé.

In 2000, he had a short spell as an assistant coach of the Ghana national team. After leaving the Ghanaian side, Razak went to Mali, where he won the Malien Premiere Division and cup double with Stade Malien. The club did not lose any matches on its way to winning the title. In 2003, he was appointed the coach of Kumasi Asante Kotoko and helped the club win their first local league in ten years. He discharged of his post after the 2003–04 league season, eventually returning to Stade Malien for two additional seasons.

He also coached Real Tamale United in the Ghana Premier League from 2007 to 2009. He also coached the Qatari side Al-Markhiya in two separate tenures, the most recent ending in 2014.

== Achievements ==
In a 1999 poll held by the IFFHS to select the best footballers of the 20th Century, Razak ranked 31st among African players, and in 2007, he was selected as one of the 30 best African footballers of the previous 50 years by CAF, through internet voting. Razak's career titles and individual honours include:

=== Player ===
Asante Kotoko

- Ghana Premier League: 1981, 1986, 1987
- Ghanaian FA Cup: 1978
- Ghana SWAG Cup: 1988

New York Cosmos

- North American Soccer League season: 1978
- Trans-Atlantic Challenge Cup: 1980

Al Ain FC

- Joint League Cup: 1983

Arab Contractors SC

- African Cup Winners' Cup: 1983

Africa Sports

- Côte d'Ivoire Premier Division: 1989
- Côte d'Ivoire Cup: 1989
- Coupe Houphouët-Boigny: 1989

Ghana

- African Cup of Nations: 1978

Individual

- UAE Pro-League top scorer: 1980–81
- African Footballer of the Year: 1978
- Best AFCON Player: 1978
- Egyptian Player of the Year: 1984, 1985

=== Manager ===
Stade Malien

- Malien Premiere Division: 2000–01, 2002, 2005, 2005–06
- Malien Cup: 2001, 2006
- Super Coupe National du Mali: 2001, 2005, 2006

Asante Kotoko

- Ghana Premier League: 2003
- SWAG Cup: 2003
- GHALCA Top 4: 2003

Individual

- Malien Premiere Division Coach of the Year: 2001, 2002, 2005, 2006
- SWAG Coach of the Year: 2003
