= Edward Semwanga =

Ugandan footballer

Personal information
- Place of birth: Uganda
- Position: Midfielder

International career
Years	Team	Apps	(Gls)
1974–1978	Uganda	12	(1)

Edward Semwanga (or Eddie Ssemwanga) is a Uganda midfielder who played for Uganda in the 1978 African Cup of Nations.
