= Phillip Omondi =

Ugandan footballer and manager (1957-1999)

Personal information
- Date of birth: 1957
- Place of birth: Tororo, Uganda
- Date of death: 21 April 1999
- Position: Forward

Youth career
- 1970: Naguru Youth

Senior career*
Years	Team	Apps	(Gls)
1973–1979	KCC		
1979–1983	Sharjah		
1983–1987	KCC		

International career
1973–1987	Uganda		
- * Club domestic league appearances and goals

Phillip Omondi (1957 – 21 April 1999) born to Kenyan parents in Tororo, was a Ugandan football player and manager.

== Playing career ==
A forward, Omondi played for local side Kampala City Council FC from 1973 to 1979, before moving to the United Arab Emirates to join Sharjah.

Omondi played for the Uganda national team at the 1974, 1976 and 1978 African Cup of Nations, where he was the leading goal-scorer as Uganda finished second. He also helped the team to the 1973 and 1977 CECAFA Cup titles.

== Career as a manager ==
Following his playing career, Omondi became a manager of Bank of Uganda FC and KCC before retiring in 1992.
