= Jean-Jacques N'Domba =

Congolese footballer (1953 or 1954 – 2024)

Personal information
- Date of birth: 1953 or 1954
- Place of birth: Pointe-Noire, French Congo, French Equatorial Africa
- Date of death: 15 October 2024 (aged 70)
- Height: 1.70 m (5 ft 7 in)
- Position: Midfielder

Senior career*
Years	Team	Apps	(Gls)
1977–1982	Étoile du Congo		
1982–1984	Marseille	24	(6)
1984–1986	Le Puy	63	(16)
1986–1988	Lyon	57	(13)
1988–1991	Chamois Niortais	77	(4)
1991–1992	Poitiers		

International career
1974–1992	Congo	35	(8)
- * Club domestic league appearances and goals

Jean-Jacques N'Domba (1953 or 1954 – 15 October 2024), nicknamed Géomètre, was a Congolese professional footballer who played as a midfielder. He died on 15 October 2024, at the age of 70.
