= Abdulla Nasur =

Ugandan footballer

Personal information
- Place of birth: Uganda
- Position: Midfielder

International career
Years	Team	Apps	(Gls)
1977–1978	Uganda	3	(1)

Abdulla Nasur is a Ugandan midfielder who played for Uganda in the 1978 African Cup of Nations.
