= Opoku Afriyie =

Ghanaian footballer (1955–2020)

Personal information
- Date of birth: 2 February 1955
- Place of birth: Accra, Ghana
- Date of death: 29 March 2020 (aged 65)
- Place of death: Kumasi, Ghana
- Position: Forward

Senior career*
| Years | Team | Apps | (Gls) |
| 1975–1983 | Asante Kotoko | | (76+) |
| 1983–1985 | Accra Hearts of Oak | | |

International career
| 1976–1985 | Ghana | 11 | (3) |
- * Club domestic league appearances and goals

Opoku Afriyie (2 February 1955 – 29 March 2020) was a Ghanaian footballer. He was popularly called Bayie. He played as a striker and won many caps with Asante Kotoko and the Ghana national football team. He worked for Asante Kotoko as Team-Manager.

== Club career ==
Opoku Afriyie played for Asante Kotoko for several years before signing for Hearts of Oak prior to ending his footballing career. He was the top scorer in the Ghana domestic football league in 1979 and again in 1981. In 1982, he was nominated for the French magazine France Football African Footballer of the Year. He came eighth. Opoku Afriyie is among 20 other Ghanaians nominated by CAF out of a total of 200 African footballers for the title of the best African player of the last 50 years.

== International career ==
He was a member of the squad that won the 1978 African Cup of Nations making Ghana the first team to win it thrice. He scored the two goals in the final of that tournament. He also played in the 1980 African Cup of Nations where Ghana failed to defend its title.

== Coaching career ==
Opoku Afriyie was appointed team manager of Asante Kotoko in 2003. He has also served as the team manager and welfare officer of the Black Stars.

== Honours ==
=== Club ===
Asante Kotoko

- Ghana Premier League: 1980, 1981
- Ghanaian FA Cup: 1978

=== International ===
Ghana

- African Cup of Nations: 1978, 1982

=== Individual ===
- Africa Cup of Nations top scorer: 1978
- Ghana Premier League Top scorer: 1979, 1981
