= 1978 African Cup of Nations =

11th edition of the Africa Cup of Nations

Tournament details
- Host country: Ghana
- Dates: 5–16 March
- Teams: 8
- Venues: 2 (in 2 host cities)

Final positions
- Champions: Ghana (3rd title)
- Runners-up: Uganda
- Third place: Nigeria
- Fourth place: Tunisia

Tournament statistics
- Matches played: 16
- Goals scored: 38 (2.38 per match)
- Top scorer(s): (Ghana) Opoku Afriyie (Nigeria) Segun Odegbami (Uganda) Phillip Omondi (3 goals each)
- Best player: (Ghana) Karim Abdul Razak

The 1978 African Cup of Nations was the eleventh edition of the African Cup of Nations, the international football championship run by the Confederation of African Football (CAF). It was hosted by Ghana and played in the cities of Accra and Kumasi.

The format of the competition changed from 1976: the field of eight teams was still split into two groups of four, but the final group stage was eliminated in favor of the knockout semi-finals used in tournaments prior to 1976 (except 1959). Hosts Ghana won a third championship, defeating Uganda 2−0 in the final.

Ivory Coast and Mali were both disqualified in the second round of qualification; Ivory Coast for using an ineligible player in the second leg, and Mali after stadium security and police assaulted match officials during the first leg. Since Mali had received a first round walkover after Niger failed to appear, Upper Volta, who had been beaten by the Ivory Coast in the first round, were given their place in the final tournament.

== Qualified teams ==
The 8 qualified teams are:

Team	Qualified as	Qualified on	Previous appearances in tournament (Note: Bold indicates champion for that year, Italic indicates host.)
Ghana	Hosts		4 (**1963**, **1965**, 1968, 1970)
Morocco	Holders	14 March 1976	2 (1972, **1976**)
Nigeria	2nd round winners	26 June 1977	2 (1963, 1976)
Uganda	2nd round winners	26 June 1977	4 (1962, 1968, 1974, 1976)
Zambia	2nd round winners	26 June 1977	1 (1974)
Upper Volta (Note: Ivory Coast originally qualified by beating Mali 2–1 on aggregate, but both teams were disqualified: Ivory Coast for fielding an ineligible player in the second leg, and Mali due to police and stadium security assaulting the match officials during the first leg. Upper Volta, who had lost to Ivory Coast in the previous round, were given their place in the finals.)	2nd round winners	17 July 1977	0 (debut)
Congo	2nd round winners	31 July 1977	3 (1968 **1972**, 1974)
Tunisia	2nd round winners	16 October 1977	3 (1962, 1963, 1965)

== Venues ==
The competition was played in two venues in Accra and Kumasi.

Accra	1978 African Cup of Nations is located in Ghana
Accra Sports Stadium	1978 African Cup of Nations is located in Ghana
Capacity: 40,000	1978 African Cup of Nations is located in Ghana
Kumasi	1978 African Cup of Nations is located in Ghana
Kumasi Sports Stadium	1978 African Cup of Nations is located in Ghana
Capacity: 40,500	1978 African Cup of Nations is located in Ghana

== Group stage ==
=== Tiebreakers ===
If two or more teams finished level on points after completion of the group matches, the following tie-breakers were used to determine the final ranking:

1. Goal difference in all group matches
2. Greater number of goals scored in all group matches
3. Drawing of lots

=== Group A ===
Pos	Team	Pld	W	D	L	GF	GA	GD	Pts	Qualification
1	Ghana (H)	3	2	1	0	6	2	+4	5	Advance to Knockout stage
2	Nigeria	3	1	2	0	5	3	+2	4	Advance to Knockout stage
3	Zambia	3	1	1	1	3	2	+1	3	
4	Upper Volta	3	0	0	3	2	9	−7	0	

Rules for classification: Group stage tiebreakers
(H) Hosts
5 March 1978

Ghana	2–1	Zambia
Afriyie 21'; Abdul Razak 55'	Report	Kapita 8'

Accra Sports Stadium, Accra
Attendance: 50,000
Referee: Suleiman El Naim (Sudan)

5 March 1978

Nigeria	4–2	Upper Volta
Chukwu 17'; Amiesimaka 31'; Odegbami 44', 82'	Report	Hien 50'; Koïta 52'

Accra Sports Stadium, Accra
Attendance: 50,000
Referee: ... Sylla

8 March 1978

Zambia	2–0	Upper Volta
P. Phiri 20'; B. Phiri 88'	Report

Accra Sports Stadium, Accra
Attendance: 60,000
Referee: C. Monty

8 March 1978

Nigeria	1–1	Ghana
Odegbami 33'	Report	Klutse 76'

Accra Sports Stadium, Accra
Attendance: 60,000

10 March 1978

Zambia	0–0	Nigeria
	Report

Accra Sports Stadium, Accra
Attendance: 25,000

10 March 1978

Ghana	3–0	Upper Volta
Alhassan 3', 59'; Polo 52'	Report

Accra Sports Stadium, Accra
Attendance: 25,000
Referee: Pierre Mutombo (Zaïre)

=== Group B ===
Pos	Team	Pld	W	D	L	GF	GA	GD	Pts	Qualification
1	Uganda	3	2	0	1	7	4	+3	4 (Note: Tied on overall points. Overall goal difference: Uganda +3, Tunisia +2.)	Advance to Knockout stage
2	Tunisia	3	1	2	0	4	2	+2	4	Advance to Knockout stage
3	Morocco	3	1	1	1	2	4	−2	3	
4	Congo	3	0	1	2	1	4	−3	1	

Rules for classification: Group stage tiebreakers
Notes:
6 March 1978

Morocco	1–1	Tunisia
Acila 29'	Report	Kaabi 63'

Kumasi Sports Stadium, Kumasi
Referee: Gebreyesus Tesfaye (Ethiopia)

6 March 1978

Uganda	3–1	Congo
Omondi 1'; Semwanga 31'; Kisitu 81'	Report	Mamounoubala 80'

Kumasi Sports Stadium, Kumasi
Referee: Hussein Fahmy (Egypt)

9 March 1978

Tunisia	3–1	Uganda
Labidi 36'; Ben Aziza 38', 83'	Report	Musenze 71'

Kumasi Sports Stadium, Kumasi
Attendance: 50,000
Referee: Abdelkader Aouissi (Algeria)

9 March 1978

Morocco	1–0	Congo
Acila 28'	Report

Kumasi Sports Stadium, Kumasi
Attendance: 50,000
Referee: Youssou N'Diaye (Senegal)

11 March 1978

Congo	0–0	Tunisia
	Report

Kumasi Sports Stadium, Kumasi
Attendance: 20,000
Referee: Salem Mohamed Adal (Libya)

11 March 1978

Uganda	3–0	Morocco
Kisitu 13'; Nsereko 32'; Omondi 36'	Report

Kumasi Sports Stadium, Kumasi
Attendance: 20,000
Referee: Théophile Lawson-Hétchéli (Togo)

== Knockout stage ==
=== Bracket ===
Semi-finals
14 March – Accra
Ghana	1
Tunisia	0
14 March – Kumasi
Uganda	2
Nigeria	1

Final
16 March – Accra
Ghana	2
Uganda	0
Third place
16 March – Accra
Tunisia	0
Nigeria (awd.)	2^{1}

=== Semi-finals ===
14 March 1978

Ghana	1–0	Tunisia
Abdul Razak 57'	Report

Accra Sports Stadium, Accra
Attendance: 10,000
Referee: Youssef El Ghoul (Libya)

14 March 1978

Uganda	2–1	Nigeria
Nasur 11'; Omondi 58'	Report	Eyo 54'

Kumasi Sports Stadium, Kumasi
Attendance: 10,000
Referee: Abdelkader Aouissi (Algeria)

=== Third place match ===
16 March 1978

Nigeria	2–0 (Awarded)	Tunisia
Mohammed 42'	Report	Akid 19'

Accra Sports Stadium, Accra
Referee: Théophile Lawson-Hétchéli (Togo)

^{1} The match was abandoned after Tunisia walked off in the 42nd minute with the score tied at 1–1 to protest the officiating. Nigeria were awarded a 2–0 win, and Tunisia were suspended for two years (also banning them from the next tournament).

=== Final ===
16 March 1978

Ghana	2–0	Uganda
Afriyie 38', 64'	Report

Accra Sports Stadium, Accra
Attendance: 40,000
Referee: Youssef El Ghoul (Libya)

== Goalscorers ==
There were 38 goals scored in 16 matches, for an average of 2.38 goals per match.

3 goals

- (Ghana) Opoku Afriyie
- (Nigeria) Segun Odegbami
- (Uganda) Phillip Omondi

2 goals

- (Ghana) Karim Abdul Razak
- (Ghana) George Alhassan
- (Morocco) Hassan "Acila" Amcharrat
- (Tunisia) Abderraouf Ben Aziza
- (Uganda) Godfrey Kisitu

1 goal

- (Republic of the Congo) Jacques Mamounoubala
- (Ghana) Willie Klutse
- (Tunisia) Akid
- (Ghana) Mohammed "Polo" Ahmed
- (Nigeria) Adokiye Amiesimaka
- (Nigeria) Christian Chukwu
- (Nigeria) Martins Eyo
- (Tunisia) Ali Kaabi
- (Tunisia) Mohsen Labidi
- (Uganda) Samuel Musenze
- (Uganda) Abdulla Nasur
- (Uganda) Moses Nsereko
- (Uganda) Edward Semwanga
- (Republic of Upper Volta) Hubert Hien
- (Republic of Upper Volta) Mamadaou Koïta
- (Zambia) Obby Kapita
- (Zambia) Bizwell Phiri
- (Zambia) Patrick Phiri
- (Nigeria) Baba Otu Mohammed

== Team of the Tournament ==
Goalkeeper

- (Morocco) Mohammed Hazzaz

Defenders

- (Tunisia) Mokhtar Dhouieb
- (Ghana) James Kuuku Dadzie
- (Tunisia) Khaled Gasmi
- (Morocco) Larbi Ihardane

Midfielders

- (Uganda) Moses Nsereko
- (Ghana) Karim Abdul Razak
- (Ghana) Adolf Armah
- (Uganda) Phillip Omondi

Forwards

- (Nigeria) Segun Odegbami
- (Ghana) Mohammed Polo
