= Yousef El Ghoul =

Libyan football referee

Yousef Muhammad El Ghoul (Arabic: يوسف محمد الغول) (June 1, 1936 – December 27, 1997) was a Libyan football referee. He is known for having refereed one match in the 1982 World Cup in Spain, between the USSR and New Zealand in Málaga. He was, and is still, the only Libyan to referee a match in FIFA World Cup.
