= 1978 FIFA World Cup Group 2 =

Football tournament group stage

Group 2 of the 1978 FIFA World Cup was one of four groups of nations competing at the 1978 FIFA World Cup. The group consisted of Poland, West Germany, Tunisia and Mexico.

== Standings ==
Pos	Team	Pld	W	D	L	GF	GA	GD	Pts	Qualification
1	Poland	3	2	1	0	4	1	+3	5	Advance to second round
2	West Germany	3	1	2	0	6	0	+6	4	Advance to second round
3	Tunisia	3	1	1	1	3	2	+1	3	
4	Mexico	3	0	0	3	2	12	−10	0	

Source: FIFA

== Matches ==
=== West Germany vs Poland ===
1 June 1978
15:00 ART

West Germany	0–0	Poland

Estadio Monumental, Buenos Aires
Attendance: 67,579
Referee: Ángel Norberto Coerezza (Argentina)

West Germany	Poland

GK	1	Sepp Maier
SW	5	Manfred Kaltz
RB	2	Berti Vogts (c)
CB	4	Rolf Rüssmann
LB	8	Herbert Zimmermann
MF	6	Rainer Bonhof
MF	10	Heinz Flohe
MF	15	Erich Beer
MF	20	Hansi Müller
FW	7	Rüdiger Abramczik
FW	9	Klaus Fischer
Manager:
Helmut Schön

GK	1	Jan Tomaszewski
SW	6	Jerzy Gorgoń
RB	3	Henryk Maculewicz
CB	9	Władysław Żmuda
LB	4	Antoni Szymanowski
CM	5	Adam Nawałka
CM	12	Kazimierz Deyna (c)
CM	11	Bohdan Masztaler	(substituted off) 84'
RW	16	Grzegorz Lato
LW	17	Andrzej Szarmach
CF	19	Włodzimierz Lubański	(substituted off) 79'
Substitutions:
AM	18	Zbigniew Boniek	(substituted on) 79'
CM	8	Henryk Kasperczak	(substituted on) 84'
Manager:
Jacek Gmoch

=== Tunisia vs Mexico ===
2 June 1978
16:45 ART

Tunisia	3–1	Mexico
Kaabi 55'; Ghommidh 79'; Dhouieb 87'		Vázquez Ayala 45' (pen.)

Estadio Gigante de Arroyito, Rosario
Attendance: 17,396
Referee: John Gordon (Scotland)

Tunisia	Mexico

GK	22	Mokhtar Naili
DF	2	Mokhtar Dhouieb
DF	3	Ali Kaabi
DF	5	Mohsen Labidi
DF	20	Amor Jebali
MF	6	Néjib Ghommidh
MF	7	Témime Lahzami (c)	(substituted off) 88'
MF	8	Mohamed Ben Rehaiem
MF	10	Tarak Dhiab
FW	9	Mohamed Akid
FW	11	Abderraouf Ben Aziza	(substituted off) 81'
Substitutions:
FW	14	Slah Karoui	(substituted on) 81'
MF	12	Khemais Labidi	(substituted on) 88'
Manager:
Abdelmajid Chetali

GK	1	José Pilar Reyes
DF	3	Alfredo Tena
DF	4	Eduardo Ramos
DF	5	Arturo Vázquez Ayala (c)
DF	12	Jesús Martínez
MF	6	Guillermo Mendizábal	(substituted off) 67'
MF	7	Antonio de la Torre
MF	17	Leonardo Cuéllar
MF	21	Raúl Isiordia
FW	9	Víctor Rangel
FW	11	Hugo Sánchez
Substitutions:
MF	18	Gerardo Lugo	(substituted on) 67'
Manager:
José Antonio Roca

=== West Germany vs Mexico ===
6 June 1978
16:45 ART

West Germany	6–0	Mexico
D. Müller 15'; H. Müller 30'; Rummenigge 38', 73'; Flohe 44', 89'

Estadio Chateau Carreras, Córdoba
Attendance: 35,258
Referee: Farouk Bouzo (Syria)

West Germany	Mexico

GK	1	Sepp Maier
SW	5	Manfred Kaltz
RB	2	Berti Vogts (c)
CB	4	Rolf Rüssmann
LB	3	Bernard Dietz
MF	6	Rainer Bonhof	(yellow card) 43'
MF	10	Heinz Flohe
MF	20	Hansi Müller
FW	11	Karl-Heinz Rummenigge
FW	14	Dieter Müller
FW	9	Klaus Fischer
Manager:
Helmut Schön

GK	1	José Pilar Reyes		(substituted off) 39'
DF	3	Alfredo Tena
DF	4	Eduardo Ramos
DF	5	Arturo Vázquez Ayala (c)	(yellow card) 44'
DF	12	Jesús Martínez
MF	6	Guillermo Mendizábal
MF	7	Antonio de la Torre
MF	17	Leonardo Cuéllar
FW	8	Enrique López Zarza		(substituted off) 46'
FW	9	Víctor Rangel
FW	11	Hugo Sánchez
Substitutions:
GK	22	Pedro Soto		(substituted on) 39'
MF	18	Gerardo Lugo		(substituted on) 46'
Manager:
José Antonio Roca

=== Poland vs Tunisia ===
6 June 1978
16:45 ART

Poland	1–0	Tunisia
Lato 43'

Estadio Gigante de Arroyito, Rosario
Attendance: 9,624
Referee: Ángel Franco Martínez (Spain)

Poland	Tunisia

GK	1	Jan Tomaszewski
SW	6	Jerzy Gorgoń
RB	4	Antoni Szymanowski
CB	9	Władysław Żmuda
LB	3	Henryk Maculewicz
CM	5	Adam Nawałka
CM	12	Kazimierz Deyna (c)
CM	8	Henryk Kasperczak
RW	16	Grzegorz Lato
LW	17	Andrzej Szarmach	(substituted off) 60'
CF	19	Włodzimierz Lubański	(substituted off) 76'
Substitutions:
LW	7	Andrzej Iwan	(substituted on) 60'
AM	18	Zbigniew Boniek	(substituted on) 76'
Manager:
Jacek Gmoch

GK	22	Mokhtar Naili
RB	2	Mokhtar Dhouieb
CB	20	Amor Jebali
CB	12	Khemais Labidi
LB	3	Ali Kaabi
DM	4	Khaled Gasmi
CM	8	Mohamed Ben Rehaiem
CM	6	Néjib Ghommidh
CM	10	Tarak Dhiab
CF	7	Témime Lahzami (c)
CF	9	Mohamed Akid
Manager:
Abdelmajid Chetali

=== West Germany vs Tunisia ===
10 June 1978
16:45 ART

West Germany	0–0	Tunisia

Estadio Olímpico Chateau Carreras, Córdoba
Attendance: 30,667
Referee: César Guerrero Orosco (Peru)

West Germany	Tunisia

GK	1	Sepp Maier
SW	5	Manfred Kaltz
RB	2	Berti Vogts (c)
CB	4	Rolf Rüssmann
LB	3	Bernard Dietz
MF	6	Rainer Bonhof
MF	10	Heinz Flohe
MF	20	Hansi Müller	(yellow card) 87'
FW	11	Karl-Heinz Rummenigge
FW	14	Dieter Müller
FW	9	Klaus Fischer
Manager:
Helmut Schön

GK	22	Mokhtar Naili
DF	2	Mokhtar Dhouieb
DF	3	Ali Kaabi
DF	20	Amor Jebali
DF/MF?	4	Khaled Gasmi
MF	6	Néjib Ghommidh
MF	7	Témime Lahzami (c)
MF	8	Mohamed Ben Rehaiem
MF	10	Tarak Dhiab	(yellow card) 68'
MF	12	Khemais Labidi
FW	9	Mohamed Akid		(substituted off) 82'
Substitutions:
FW	11	Abderraouf Ben Aziza		(substituted on) 82'
Manager:
Abdelmajid Chetali

=== Poland vs Mexico ===
10 June 1978
16:45 ART

Poland	3–1	Mexico
Boniek 43', 84'; Deyna 56'		Rangel 52'

Estadio Gigante de Arroyito, Rosario
Attendance: 22,651
Referee: Jafar Namdar (Iran)

Poland	Mexico

GK	1	Jan Tomaszewski
SW	6	Jerzy Gorgoń
RB	4	Antoni Szymanowski
CB	9	Władysław Żmuda
LB	10	Wojciech Rudy	(substituted off) 84'
DM	8	Henryk Kasperczak
CM	18	Zbigniew Boniek
CM	11	Bohdan Masztaler
AM	12	Kazimierz Deyna (c)
CF	16	Grzegorz Lato
CF	7	Andrzej Iwan	(substituted off) 76'
Substitutions:
CF	19	Włodzimierz Lubański	(substituted on) 76'
LB	3	Henryk Maculewicz	(substituted on) 84'
Manager:
Jacek Gmoch

GK	22	Pedro Soto
RB	15	Ignacio Flores
CB	13	Rigoberto Cisneros
CB	14	Carlos Gómez
LB	5	Arturo Vázquez Ayala (c)
MF	7	Antonio de la Torre
MF	17	Leonardo Cuéllar
MF	16	Javier Cárdenas	(substituted off) 46'
MF	10	Cristóbal Ortega
FW	9	Víctor Rangel
FW	11	Hugo Sánchez
Substitutions:
MF	6	Guillermo Mendizábal	(substituted on) 46'
Manager:
José Antonio Roca

== See also ==
- Germany at the FIFA World Cup
- Mexico at the FIFA World Cup
- Poland at the FIFA World Cup
- Tunisia at the FIFA World Cup
