= Algeria–Tunisia football rivalry =

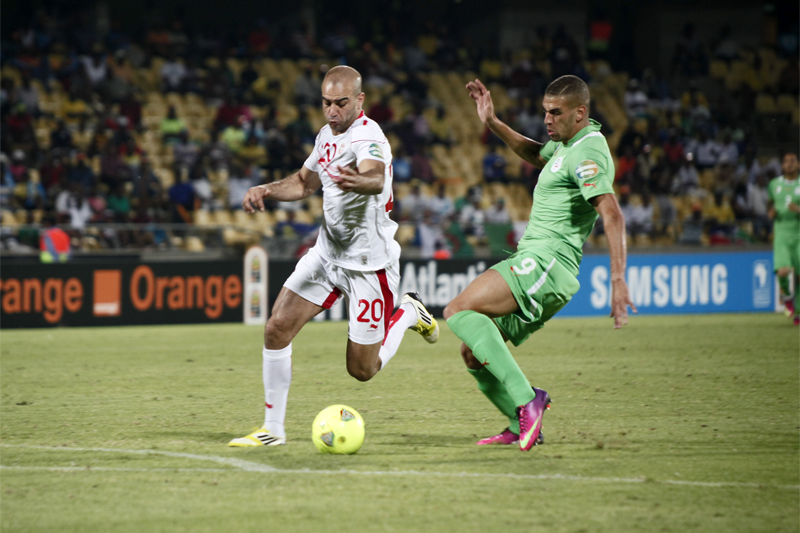
- Aymen Abdennour of Tunisia and Islam Slimani of Algeria fighting for the ball during the Maghreb derby at the 2013 Africa Cup of Nations.
- Other names: Maghreb derby
- Location: CAF (Africa); UNAF (North Africa)
- Teams: Algeria; Tunisia
- First meeting: Tunisia 0–0 Algeria; Friendly; 15 December 1963
- Latest meeting: Algeria 1–1 Tunisia; Friendly; 20 June 2023

Statistics
- Total meetings: 49
- Most wins: Algeria (18)
- Most player appearances: Lakhdar Belloumi (10)
- Top scorer: Djamel Menad (5)
- All-time series: Algeria: 18; Draw: 16; Tunisia: 15

The Algeria–Tunisia football rivalry or the Maghreb derby is a football rivalry between the national football teams of Algeria and Tunisia, having achieved three Africa Cup of Nations and two Arab Cups between the two countries.

The two nations have played 48 games against each other; Algeria leads in wins with 18 to Tunisia's 15, with the two sides drawing 15 times. The first unofficial match took place on 1 June 1957, in a friendly match between Tunisia and the FLN football team, when Algeria was a French colony. After the independence of Algeria, the first official match took place on 15 December 1963, in a friendly match at the Stade Chedly Zouiten in Tunisia.

The last defeat of Algeria against their neighbours dated back to 20 January 2017, during the 2017 Africa Cup of Nations which was hosted by Gabon. The last match between the two teams was played in Annaba as part of a friendly match on 20 June 2023 and ended in a 1–1 draw.

== Background ==
Algeria, for its part, has participated four times in the biggest football event in the world: 1982, 1986, 2010 and 2014. Tunisia has participated six times in the FIFA World Cup, the biggest men's football event in the world, in 1978, 1998, 2002, 2006, 2018 and 2022. The two have qualified together to the World Cup for the first time in 2026.

Year	Algeria		Tunisia	
Year	Qualification	Round	Qualification	Round
(Argentina) 1978	Did not qualify – Second round loser	—N/a	Qualified – Final round winner	Group stage
(Spain) 1982	Qualified – Final round winner	Group stage	Did not qualify – First round loser	—N/a
(Mexico) 1986	Qualified – Final round winner	Group stage	Did not qualify – Third round loser	—N/a
(France) 1998	Did not qualify – First round loser	—N/a	Qualified – Final round winner	Group stage
(South Korea) (Japan) 2002	Did not qualify – Second round loser	—N/a	Qualified – Second round winner	Group stage
(Germany) 2006	Did not qualify – Second round loser	—N/a	Qualified – Second round winner	Group stage
(South Africa) 2010	Qualified – Tiebreaking play-off winner	Group stage	Did not qualify – Third round loser	—N/a
(Brazil) 2014	Qualified – Third round winner	Round of 16	Did not qualify – Third round loser	—N/a
(Russia) 2018	Did not qualify – Third round loser	—N/a	Qualified – Third round winner	Group stage
(Qatar) 2022	Did not qualify – Third round loser	—N/a	Qualified – Third round winner	Group stage
(Canada) (Mexico) (United States) 2026	Qualified – CAF Group G winner	Round of 32	Qualified – CAF Group H winner	Group stage

== History ==
=== 20th century ===
The Maghreb derby between Algeria and Tunisia is one of the most enjoyable matches in Africa, due to the geographical proximity and historical relations between the two countries. After Tunisia's independence and before Algeria's independence, Tunisia played a series of matches against the FLN football team, who was a team made up mainly of professional players in France, who then joined the Algerian independence movement of the National Liberation Front. The first match between the two countries after their independence was played on 15 December 1963 at the Chedly Zouiten Stadium in Tunis and ended in a 0–0 draw.

A year later in 1964, the two teams faced each other in the 1965 All–Africa Games qualification, where Algeria qualified. In 1968, the two teams met in the first round of the 1970 FIFA World Cup qualification. Tunisia won the first leg 2–1 and drew the second leg 0–0 to qualify for the next round. In 1975, the two teams faced each other in the 1976 African Cup of Nations qualification, after a 0–0 draw in the first leg, Tunisia won the second leg 2–1. In the same year, the two teams played against each other in the 1976 Summer Olympics qualification, which ended with Tunisia winning 3–2 on aggregate. Algeria beat Tunisia in the football tournament of the 1975 Mediterranean Games, which it hosted, with a score of 2–1. In 1977, Tunisia beat Algeria in the second round of the 1978 FIFA World Cup qualification, winning 2–0 in the first leg and drawing 1–1 in the second leg, sending Tunisia through to the next round, which qualified them for the World Cup for the first time.

The two teams met again at the football tournament of the 1979 Mediterranean Games in Omiš, Yugoslavia, which ended in a 1–1 draw. In the football tournament of the 1983 Mediterranean Games in El Jadida, Morocco, Tunisia beat Algeria 3–2. In 1985, during the final round of the 1986 FIFA World Cup qualification, Algeria beat Tunisia 7–1 on aggregate, winning 4–1 in the first leg and 3–0 in the second leg, to qualify for the World Cup for the second time. In 1999, Tunisia beat Algeria home and away in Group 7 of the 2000 African Cup of Nations qualification, 1–0 home and 2–0 away.

=== 21st century ===
At the 2013 Africa Cup of Nations in Rustenburg, South Africa, Algeria and Tunisia faced off in Group D with the Eagles of Carthage wins the match with a goal from Youssef Msakni from outside the penalty area in the 90+1 minute. Msakni's goal was voted the best goal of the tournament by the Confederation of African Football.

At the 2017 Africa Cup of Nations in Franceville, Gabon, Algeria and Tunisia faced off in Group B. Tunisia had to make up for it in the second match against Algeria. Tunisia took the lead in the 50th minute after a cross from Youssef Msakni was turned into his own net by Aïssa Mandi. About ten minutes later, Faouzi Ghoulam brought down Wahbi Khazri in the area, earning a penalty kick that Naïm Sliti converted in the 66th minute. In the 92nd minute, Adlène Guedioura passed the ball inside the penalty area to Sofiane Hanni, who put it in the net of goalkeeper Aymen Mathlouthi, who was unable to stop it. The match ended with a 2−1 tunisian victory.

On 18 December 2021, the two teams played against each other in the 2021 FIFA Arab Cup final at Al Bayt Stadium in Al Khor, Qatar. The game went to extra-time and nine minutes into the first-half, Algeria's Amir Sayoud scored with a long range left footed shot into the left corner of the net. As Tunisia desperately tried to level the match deep into added on time, the ball broke from a Tunisia corner and reached Yacine Brahimi who ran into the penalty area before shooting into the empty net from six yards out to put Algeria 2–0 up.

== List of matches ==
=== National Teams ===
#	Date	Location	Home Team	Score	Away team	Competition	Home Team	Away team	Ref.
1	15 December 1963	Tunis, Tunisia	Tunisia	0–0	Algeria	Friendly	—	—	
2	27 December 1964	Algiers, Algeria	Algeria	1–0	Tunisia	1965 All-Africa Games qualification	Bentahar 89'	—	
3	14 March 1964	Tunis, Tunisia	Tunisia	0–0	Algeria	1965 All-Africa Games qualification	—	—	
4	17 November 1968	Algiers, Algeria	Algeria	1–2	Tunisia	1970 FIFA World Cup qualification	Amirouche 29' (pen.)	Chakroun 72', 80'	
5	29 December 1968	Tunis, Tunisia	Tunisia	0–0	Algeria	1970 FIFA World Cup qualification	—	—	
6	5 June 1972	Tunis, Tunisia	Tunisia	3–1	Algeria	Friendly	Akid 32', 59', 72'	Gamouh 50'	
7	16 November 1972	Tunis, Tunisia	Tunisia	1–2	Algeria	Friendly	Habita 44'	Dali 4', 18'	
8	11 May 1974	Algiers, Algeria	Algeria	1–2	Tunisia	Friendly	Gamouh 4'	Melki 71' (pen.); Lahzami 82'	
9	23 March 1975	Tunis, Tunisia	Tunisia	1–1	Algeria	1976 African Cup of Nations qualification	Habita 86'	Gamouh 64'	
10	6 April 1975	Oran, Algeria	Algeria	1–2	Tunisia	1976 African Cup of Nations qualification	Ighil 59'	Khouini 44', 89'	
11	11 May 1975	Algiers, Algeria	Algeria	1–1	Tunisia	1976 Summer Olympics qualification	Madani 83'	Habita 38'	
12	1 June 1975	Tunis, Tunisia	Tunisia	2–1	Algeria	1976 Summer Olympics qualification	Agrebi 56'; Liman 74'	Belkedrouci 80'	
13	4 September 1975	Algiers, Algeria	Algeria	2–1 (a.e.t.)	Tunisia	1975 Mediterranean Games	Naïm 62'; Draoui 96'	Kammoun 70'	
14	6 February 1977	Tunis, Tunisia	Tunisia	2–0	Algeria	1978 FIFA World Cup qualification	Akid 56'; Kaabi 73'	—	
15	28 February 1977	Algiers, Algeria	Algeria	1–1	Tunisia	1978 FIFA World Cup qualification	Guendouz 34'	Jebali 89'	
16	23 September 1979	(Socialist Federal Republic of Yugoslavia) Omiš, Yugoslavia	Algeria	1–1	Tunisia	1979 Mediterranean Games	Bousri 38'	Bayari 5'	
17	7 February 1982	Tunis, Tunisia	Tunisia	0–1	Algeria	Friendly	—	Assad 56'	
18	19 December 1982	Tunis, Tunisia	Tunisia	0–1	Algeria	Friendly	—	Guemri 56'	
19	11 September 1983	El Jadida, Morocco	Tunisia	3–2	Algeria	1983 Mediterranean Games	Hergal 10'; Rakbaoui 31'; Ben Messaoud 43'	Belloumi 36'; Guendouz 89' (pen.)	
20	30 December 1984	Abidjan, Ivory Coast	Algeria	3–1	Tunisia	Friendly (Abidjan Tournament)	Jefjef 28', 61'; Yahi 75'	Hsoumi (pen.)	
21	1 May 1985	Tunis, Tunisia	Tunisia	1–0	Algeria	Friendly	Maâloul 80' (pen.)	—	
22	6 October 1985	Tunis, Tunisia	Tunisia	1–4	Algeria	1986 FIFA World Cup qualification	Rakbaoui 16'	Madjer 24'; Menad 43', 87'; Kaci-Saïd 67'	
23	18 October 1985	Algiers, Algeria	Algeria	3–0	Tunisia	1986 FIFA World Cup qualification	Madjer 8'; Menad 34'; Yahi 78'	—	
24	11 January 1987	Tunis, Tunisia	Tunisia	0–2	Algeria	1987 All-Africa Games qualification	—	Belloumi 18'; Menad 87'	
—	21 February 1987	Algiers, Algeria	Algeria	Cancelled	Tunisia	1987 All-Africa Games qualification	—	—	—
25	27 March 1987	Algiers, Algeria	Algeria	1–0	Tunisia	1988 African Cup of Nations qualification	Madjer 19' (pen.)	—	
26	12 April 1987	Tunis, Tunisia	Tunisia	1–1	Algeria	1988 African Cup of Nations qualification	Rakbaoui 31'	Menad 38'	
27	11 December 1987	Algiers, Algeria	Algeria	0–0	Tunisia	1988 Arab Cup	—	—	
28	5 November 1988	Tunis, Tunisia	Tunisia	1–0	Algeria	Friendly	Rakbaoui 32'	—	
29	4 April 1989	Algiers, Algeria	Algeria	2–0	Tunisia	Friendly	Hadj Adlane 34'; Menni 80'	—	
30	1 November 1989	Tunis, Tunisia	Tunisia	0–0	Algeria	Friendly	—	—	
31	5 March 1991	Annaba, Algeria	Algeria	2–1	Tunisia	Friendly	Rahem 51'; Bounâas 76'	Khmiri 83'	
32	7 April 1991	Tunis, Tunisia	Tunisia	0–0	Algeria	Friendly	—	—	
33	23 September 1992	Tunis, Tunisia	Tunisia	1–1	Algeria	Friendly	Hamrouni 16'	Meziane 38'	
34	16 December 1994	Sfax, Tunisia	Tunisia	1–0	Algeria	Friendly	Bechaouch 55'	—	
35	22 July 1995	Algiers, Algeria	Algeria	2–1	Tunisia	Friendly	Lazizi 81'; Kaci-Saïd 88'	Ben Hassen 55'	
36	5 November 1995	Tunis, Tunisia	Tunisia	2–0	Algeria	Friendly (7th November Cup)	Sellimi 13'; Ben Hassen 56'	—	
37	4 January 1997	Sfax, Tunisia	Tunisia	0–0	Algeria	Friendly	—	—	
38	31 May 1997	Tunis, Tunisia	Tunisia	0–1	Algeria	Friendly	—		
39	22 January 1999	Algiers, Algeria	Algeria	0–1	Tunisia	2000 African Cup of Nations qualification	—	Rouissi 44'	
40	6 June 1999	Tunis, Tunisia	Tunisia	2–0	Algeria	2000 African Cup of Nations qualification	Mhedhebi 55'; Thabet 90'	—	
41	28 June 2000	Tunis, Tunisia	Tunisia	2–2	Algeria	Friendly	Mhedhebi 58', 70'	Abaci 23'; Meçabih 44'	
42	12 November 2011	Blida, Algeria	Algeria	1–0	Tunisia	Friendly	Boudebouz 42'	—	
43	22 January 2013	Rustenburg, South Africa	Tunisia	1–0	Algeria	2013 Africa Cup of Nations	Msakni 90+1'	—	
44	11 January 2015	Radès, Tunisia	Tunisia	1–1	Algeria	Friendly	Khazri 44'	Cadamuro 39'	
45	19 January 2017	Franceville, Gabon	Algeria	1–2	Tunisia	2017 Africa Cup of Nations	Hanni 90+2'	Mandi 50' (o.g.); Sliti 66' (pen.)	
46	26 March 2019	Blida, Algeria	Algeria	1–0	Tunisia	Friendly	Bounedjah 70' (pen.)	—	
47	11 June 2021	Radès, Tunisia	Tunisia	0–2	Algeria	Friendly	—	Bounedjah 19'; Mahrez 28'	
48	18 December 2021	Al Khor, Qatar	Tunisia	0–2 (a.e.t.)	Algeria	2021 FIFA Arab Cup final	—	Sayoud 99'; Brahimi 120+5'	
49	20 June 2023	Annaba, Algeria	Algeria	1–1	Tunisia	Friendly	Mahrez 38' (pen.)	Talbi 13'	

=== Local Teams ===
#	Date	Location	Home Team	Score	Away team	Competition	Home Team	Away team	Ref.
1	15 December 1963	Tunis, Tunisia	Algeria	1–1 (a.e.t.) (3–5 p)	Tunisia	2011 African Nations Championship	Djabou 62'	Gasdaoui 18'	

== Major encounters ==
=== 1975 Mediterranean Games ===
4 September 1975

Algeria	2–1 (a.e.t.)	Tunisia
Naïm 62'; Draoui 96'		Kammoun 70'

Stade 5 Juillet 1962, Algiers
Attendance: 70,000

=== 1979 Mediterranean Games ===
23 September 1979

Algeria	1–1	Tunisia
Bousri 38'		Bayari 5'

Omiš Stadium, Omiš

=== 2013 Africa Cup of Nations ===
22 January 2013
20:00

Tunisia	1–0	Algeria
Msakni 90+1'	Report

Royal Bafokeng Stadium, Rustenburg
Attendance: 10,000
Referee: Bakary Gassama (Gambia)

=== 2017 Africa Cup of Nations ===
19 January 2017
17:00 UTC+1

Algeria	1–2	Tunisia
Hanni 90+2'	Report	Mandi 50' (o.g.); Sliti 66' (pen.)

Stade de Franceville, Franceville
Referee: Bernard Camille (Seychelles)

=== 2021 FIFA Arab Cup ===
18 December 2021
18:00

Tunisia	0–2 (a.e.t.)	Algeria
	Report	Sayoud 99'; Brahimi 120+5'

Al Bayt Stadium, Al Khor
Attendance: 60,456
Referee: Daniel Siebert (Germany)

== Statistics ==
=== Overall ===
Competition	Matches	Algeria Wins	Draws	Tunisia Wins	Algeria Goals	Tunisia Goals	Goals Difference
Africa Cup of Nations	2	0	0	2	1	3	–2
FIFA World Cup qualification	6	2	2	2	9	6	+3
Africa Cup of Nations qualification	6	1	2	3	4	7	–3
Summer Olympics qualification	2	0	1	1	2	3	–1
African Games qualification	3	2	1	0	3	0	+3
Mediterranean Games	3	1	1	1	5	5	0
FIFA Arab Cup	2	1	1	0	2	0	2
Friendly Match	25	11	8	6	25	19	+6
Total	49	18	16	15	51	43	+8

=== Titles ===
Algeria	Competition	Tunisia
2 (1990, 2019)	Africa Cup of Nations	1 (2004)
0	African Nations Championship	1 (2011)
1 (2021)	FIFA Arab Cup	1 (1963)
1 (1991)	Afro-Asian Cup of Nations	0
4	Aggregate	3

== See also ==
- Algeria–Tunisia border
- Algeria–Tunisia relations
