= Tunisia at the FIFA World Cup =

International football delegation

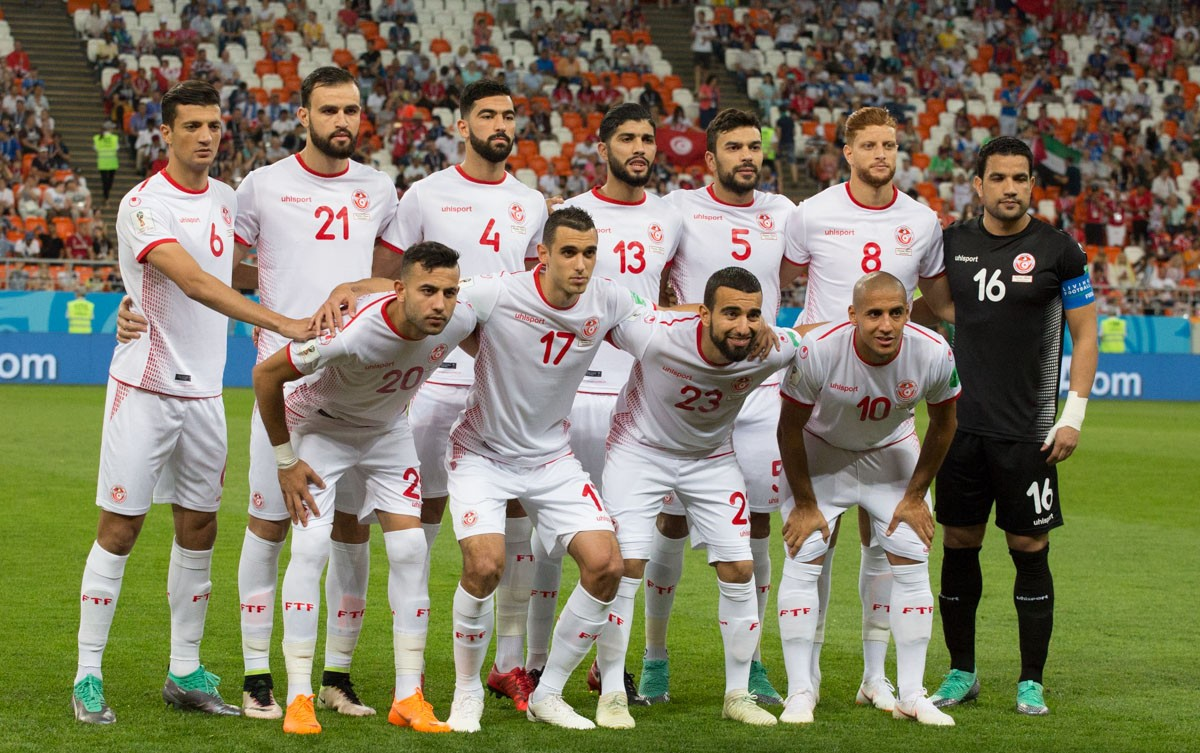
Tunisia national team line-up against Panama at the 2018 FIFA World Cup in Russia.

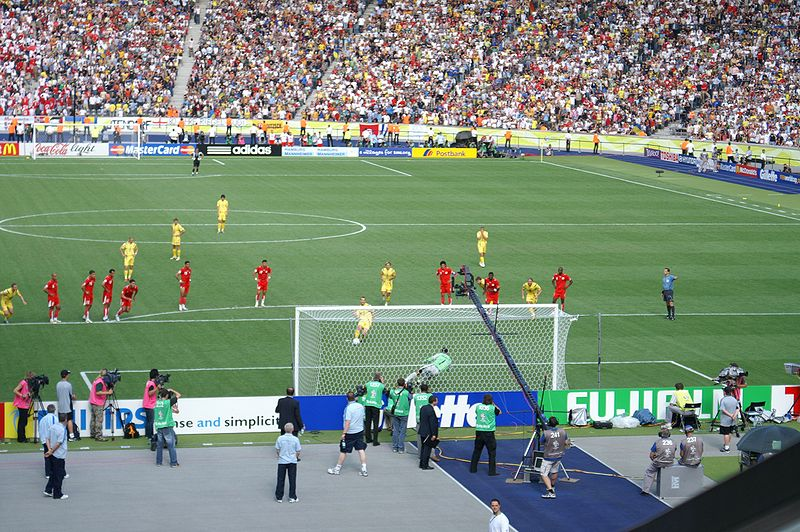
Tunisia against Ukraine at the Olympiastadion during the 2006 FIFA World Cup in Germany.

Tunisia against Netherlands at the Arrowhead Stadium during the 2026 FIFA World Cup in United States.

Tunisia has participated six times in the FIFA World Cup, the biggest men's football event in the world, in 1978, 1998, 2002, 2006, 2018, 2022 and 2026. Throughout all the participations, Tunisia was unable to advance beyond the group stage. Tunisia qualified for the World Cup for the first time in its history during the 1978 edition in Argentina, competing in Group 2 under the leadership of coach Abdelmajid Chetali. Tunisia became the first African and Arab team to win a World Cup match, after defeating Mexico 3−1 in Tunisia's first match in the competition. The team then lost to Poland 0−1 and drew with defending champion West Germany 0−0, exiting the tournament in the group stage. Ali Kaabi, Mokhtar Dhouieb and Néjib Ghommidh scored the team's goals.

Tunisia failed to qualify for the World Cup for the next four editions until returning 20 years later to the 1998 FIFA World Cup in France, competing in Group G, led by polish coach Henryk Kasperczak. The team lost its first two matches against England 0−2 and Colombia 0−1, and tied with Romania in the last round 1−1. Skander Souayah scored Tunisia's only goal in the tournament. Tunisia qualified for the 2002 FIFA World Cup in South Korea and Japan, where Tunisia played its matches in Japan, competing in Group H, led by coach Ammar Souayah. The team lost its first match against Russia 0−2, then drew 1−1 with Belgium before being eliminated again after a 0−2 defeat to hosts Japan. Raouf Bouzaiene scored Tunisia's only goal. Tunisia qualified for the 2006 FIFA World Cup in Germany competing in Group H, led by french coach Roger Lemerre. The team tied in the first match against Saudi Arabia 2−2, but suffered two defeats against the strong Spain 1−3 despite taking the lead in the first minutes of the match, and then against Ukraine 0−1. Ziad Jaziri, Radhi Jaïdi and Jawhar Mnari scored Tunisia's three goals in the tournament.

Tunisia failed to qualify for the next two editions in South Africa and Brazil, and the team returned to competition after a 12-year absence at the 2018 FIFA World Cup in Russia, where it competed in Group G, led by coach Nabil Maâloul. The team's performance did not rise as it came in a difficult group that included England, Belgium and Panama, which qualified for the first time. The team suffered two consecutive defeats against European opponents: England 1−2 and a heavy defeat to strong Belgium 2−5. However, the team won its last match against Panama 2−1. Wahbi Khazri scored two goals, while Ferjani Sassi, Dylan Bronn and Fakhreddine Ben Youssef each scored one goal. Tunisia qualified for the 2022 FIFA World Cup in Qatar, the first edition to be held in the Arab world. The team competed in Group D under the leadership of coach Jalel Kadri. The team drew 0−0 with Denmark and then suffered a 0−1 defeat to Australia, but still won 1−0 against defending champions France. But the team was unable to advance to the round of 16 due to Denmark's victory over Australia, and Tunisia left the group stage again. Khazri scored Tunisia's only goal.

In 2025, Tunisia became the first team in history to qualify for the World Cup without conceding a goal, after their 2026 World Cup qualifying campaign. Tunisia secured a spot in the 2026 FIFA World Cup, that held in the United States, Mexico, and Canada. In that tournament, Tunisia was placed in Group F, under the guidance of French coach Sabri Lamouchi. Their first match pitted the African side against Sweden, resulting in a heavy 1–5 defeat, their worst-ever World Cup result. Omar Rekik scored Tunisia’s only goal. This match marked the end of the French manager’s tenure with the Tunisian national team; he was replaced by Hervé Renard, who took charge of the team for the remaining two group-stage matches. On 21 June, Tunisia faced Japan in what was the 1,000th match in World Cup history. It was a difficult outing for the African side, as they fell 0–4. Their fortunes did not improve against the Netherlands, who defeated them 1–3, with Hazem Mastouri scoring Tunisia’s consolation goal. Tunisia concluded its seventh World Cup appearance in 47th place, just one spot ahead of Iraq.

Wahbi Khazri is the Tunisian player who has scored the most goals in the competition with three: two in 2018 and one in the 2022 edition. Ellyes Skhiri is the Tunisian player with the most matches played (nine appearances across 2018, 2022 and 2026).

== Overall record ==
FIFA World Cup record										FIFA World Cup qualification record						
Year	Round	Position	Pld	W	D*	L	GF	GA	Squad	Pld	W	D	L	GF	GA	Ref.
(Uruguay) 1930	Not affiliated									Not affiliated						
(Italy) 1934	Not affiliated									Not affiliated						
(France) 1938	Not affiliated									Not affiliated						
(Brazil) 1950	Not affiliated									Not affiliated						
(Switzerland) 1954	Not affiliated									Not affiliated						
(Sweden) 1958	Not a FIFA member									Not a FIFA member						
(Chile) 1962	Did not qualify									3	1	1	1	4	4	
(England) 1966	Withdrew									Withdrew						
(Mexico) 1970	Did not qualify									5	1	4	0	4	3	
(West Germany) 1974	Did not qualify									4	1	1	2	5	5	
(Argentina) 1978	Group stage	9th	3	1	1	1	3	2	Squad	10	4	4	2	15	9	
(Spain) 1982	Did not qualify									2	1	0	1	2	2	
(Mexico) 1986	Did not qualify									8	4	0	4	11	9	
(Italy) 1990	Did not qualify									10	4	1	5	10	11	
(United States) 1994	Did not qualify									6	3	3	0	14	2	
(France) 1998	Group stage	26th	3	0	1	2	1	4	Squad	8	7	1	0	15	2	
(South Korea) (Japan) 2002	Group stage	29th	3	0	1	2	1	5	Squad	10	8	2	0	28	5	
(Germany) 2006	Group stage	24th	3	0	1	2	3	6	Squad	10	6	3	1	25	9	
(South Africa) 2010	Did not qualify									12	7	3	2	18	7	
(Brazil) 2014	Did not qualify									8	4	3	1	14	10	
(Russia) 2018	Group stage	24th	3	1	0	2	5	8	Squad	8	6	2	0	15	6	
(Qatar) 2022	Group stage	21st	3	1	1	1	1	1	Squad	8	5	2	1	12	2	
(Canada) (Mexico) (United States) 2026	Group stage	47th	3	0	0	3	2	12	Squad	10	9	1	0	22	0	
(Morocco) (Portugal) (Spain) 2030	To be determined									To be determined						
(Saudi Arabia) 2034	To be determined									To be determined						
Total: 7/17	Group stage	7/22	21	3	5	13	16	38	—	122	71	31	20	214	86	—

== List of matches ==
Win Draw Loss

Part	Year	No.	Round	Date	Opponent	Result	Tunisia scorers	Ref.
1	(Argentina) 1978	1	Group 2	2 June 1978	Mexico	3–1	Kaabi 55', Ghommidh 79', Dhouieb 87'	
1	(Argentina) 1978	2	Group 2	6 June 1978	Poland	0–1	—	
1	(Argentina) 1978	3	Group 2	10 June 1978	West Germany	0–0	—	
2	(France) 1998	4	Group G	15 June 1998	England	0–2	—	
2	(France) 1998	5	Group G	22 June 1998	Colombia	0–1	—	
2	(France) 1998	6	Group G	26 June 1998	Romania	1–1	Souayah 12' (pen.)	
3	(South Korea) (Japan) 2002	7	Group H	5 June 2002	Russia	0–2	—	
3	(South Korea) (Japan) 2002	8	Group H	10 June 2002	Belgium	1–1	Bouzaiene 17'	
3	(South Korea) (Japan) 2002	9	Group H	14 June 2002	Japan	0–2	—	
4	(Germany) 2006	10	Group H	14 June 2006	Saudi Arabia	2–2	Jaziri 23', Jaïdi 90+2'	
4	(Germany) 2006	11	Group H	19 June 2006	Spain	1–3	Mnari 8'	
4	(Germany) 2006	12	Group H	23 June 2006	Ukraine	0–1	—	
5	(Russia) 2018	13	Group G	18 June 2018	England	1–2	Sassi 35' (pen.)	
5	(Russia) 2018	14	Group G	23 June 2018	Belgium	2–5	Bronn 18', Khazri 90+3'	
5	(Russia) 2018	15	Group G	28 June 2018	Panama	2–1	F. Ben Youssef 51', Khazri 66'	
6	(Qatar) 2022	16	Group D	22 November 2022	Denmark	0–0	—	
6	(Qatar) 2022	17	Group D	26 November 2022	Australia	0–1	—	
6	(Qatar) 2022	18	Group D	30 November 2022	France	1–0	Khazri 58'	
7	(Canada) (Mexico) (United States) 2026	19	Group F	14 June 2026	Sweden	1–5	Rekik 43'	—
7	(Canada) (Mexico) (United States) 2026	20	Group F	20 June 2026	Japan	0–4	—	—
7	(Canada) (Mexico) (United States) 2026	21	Group F	25 June 2026	Netherlands	1–3	Mastouri 54'	—

== Tournaments ==
=== 1978 FIFA World Cup ===
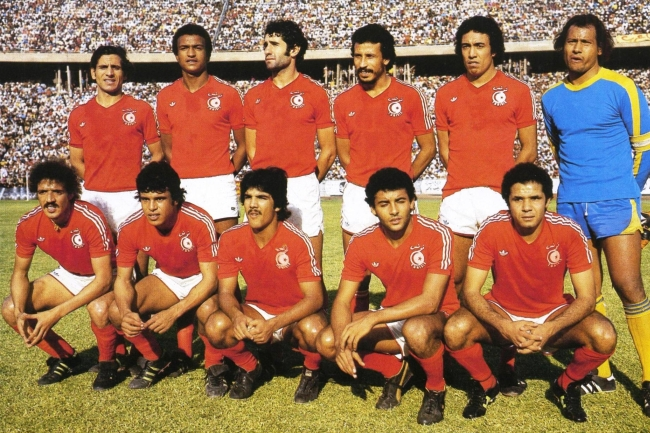
Tunisia at the 1978 FIFA World Cup qualification against Egypt.

In the first game, Mexico managed to advance through a penalty in the first half to end the break 1–0 for the Mexico. And before the start of the second half, Tunisian coach Chetali threw the Tunisian flag in front of the players and left the changing room. Tunisia managed to return to the game after Ali Kaabi scored the equalizer for Tunisia to enter history as the first Tunisian player to score a World Cup goal in the 55th minute before adding two goals to finish the game 3–1.

In the second match, they made a good performance against Poland before the team lost 1–0, but in the last game it was just around the corner to win the defending champion West Germany before the game ended 0–0. This performance has been admired by most analysts who did not expect it, and that has contributed to increasing the number of African teams qualified for the World Cup to become two. The team was received at Tunis–Carthage International Airport by Tunisians, provided by Tunisian President Habib Bourguiba, telling the players that they had accomplished the task of 50 ambassadors, because they contributed to the known of Tunisia internationally.

==== Group stage ====
Pos	Team	Pld	W	D	L	GF	GA	GD	Pts	Qualification
1	Poland	3	2	1	0	4	1	+3	5	Advance to second round
2	West Germany	3	1	2	0	6	0	+6	4	Advance to second round
3	Tunisia	3	1	1	1	3	2	+1	3	
4	Mexico	3	0	0	3	2	12	−10	0	

Source: FIFA
2 June 1978
16:45 ART

Tunisia	3–1	Mexico
Kaabi 55'; Ghommidh 79'; Dhouieb 87'	Report	Vázquez Ayala 45' (pen.)

Estadio Gigante de Arroyito, Rosario
Attendance: 17,396
Referee: John Gordon (Scotland)

6 June 1978
16:45 ART

Poland	1–0	Tunisia
Lato 43'	Report

Estadio Gigante de Arroyito, Rosario
Attendance: 9,624
Referee: Ángel Franco Martínez (Spain)

10 June 1978
16:45 ART

West Germany	0–0	Tunisia
	Report

Estadio Olímpico Chateau Carreras, Córdoba
Attendance: 30,667
Referee: César Guerrero Orosco (Peru)

=== 1998 FIFA World Cup ===
==== Group stage ====
Pos	Team	Pld	W	D	L	GF	GA	GD	Pts	Qualification
1	Romania	3	2	1	0	4	2	+2	7	Advance to knockout stage
2	England	3	2	0	1	5	2	+3	6	Advance to knockout stage
3	Colombia	3	1	0	2	1	3	−2	3	
4	Tunisia	3	0	1	2	1	4	−3	1	

Source: FIFA
15 June 1998
14:30 CET (UTC+1)

England	2–0	Tunisia
Shearer 42'; Scholes 89'	Report

Stade Vélodrome, Marseille
Attendance: 54,587
Referee: Masayoshi Okada (Japan)

22 June 1998
17:30 CET (UTC+1)

Colombia	1–0	Tunisia
Preciado 82'	Report

Stade de la Mosson, Montpellier
Attendance: 29,800
Referee: Bernd Heynemann (Germany)

26 June 1998
21:00 CET (UTC+1)

Romania	1–1	Tunisia
Moldovan 71'	Report	Souayah 12' (pen.)

Stade de France, Saint-Denis
Attendance: 77,000
Referee: Eddie Lennie (Australia)

=== 2002 FIFA World Cup ===
==== Group stage ====
Pos	Team	Pld	W	D	L	GF	GA	GD	Pts	Qualification
1	Japan (H)	3	2	1	0	5	2	+3	7	Advance to knockout stage
2	Belgium	3	1	2	0	6	5	+1	5	Advance to knockout stage
3	Russia	3	1	0	2	4	4	0	3	
4	Tunisia	3	0	1	2	1	5	−4	1	

Source: FIFA
Rules for classification: Tie-breaking criteria
(H) Hosts
5 June 2002
15:30 JST (UTC+9)

Russia	2–0	Tunisia
Titov 59'; Karpin 64' (pen.)	Report

Kobe Wing Stadium, Kobe
Attendance: 30,957
Referee: Peter Prendergast (Jamaica)

10 June 2002
18:00 JST (UTC+9)

Tunisia	1–1	Belgium
Bouzaiene 17'	Report	Wilmots 13'

Ōita Big Eye Stadium, Ōita
Attendance: 39,700
Referee: Mark Shield (Australia)

14 June 2002
15:30 JST (UTC+9)

Tunisia	0–2	Japan
	Report	Morishima 48'; H. Nakata 75'

Nagai Stadium, Osaka
Attendance: 45,213
Referee: Gilles Veissière (France)

=== 2006 FIFA World Cup ===
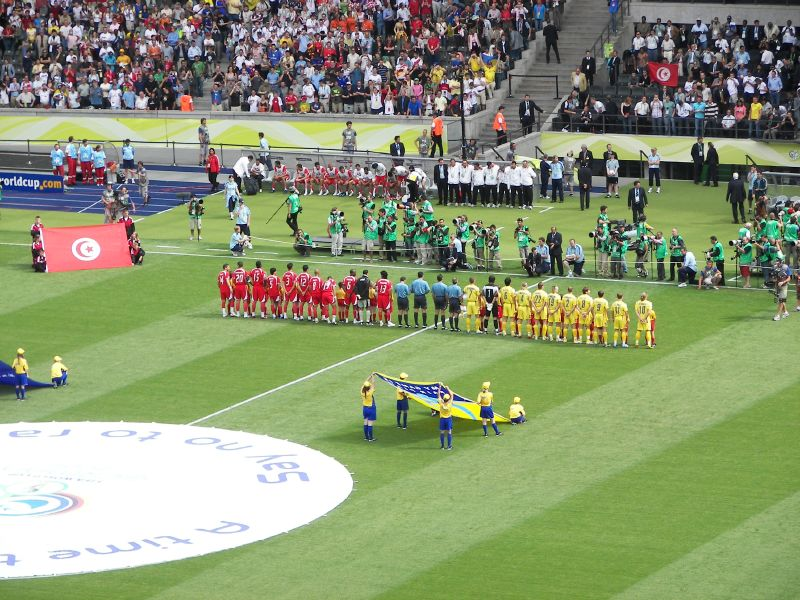
Tunisia's match against Ukraine at the Olympiastadion in Berlin during the 2006 FIFA World Cup.

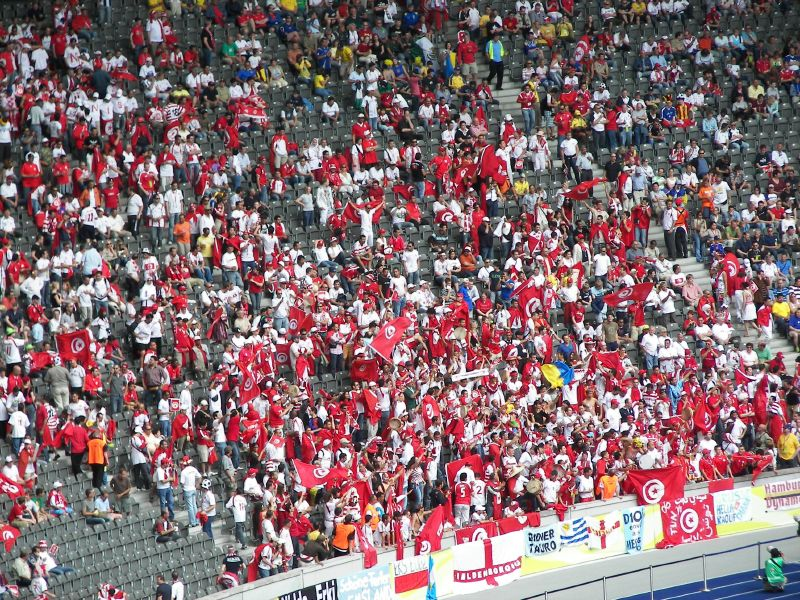
Tunisian supporters during the Tunisia v Ukraine 2006 World Cup match at the Olympiastadion in Berlin.

The 2006 World Cup begins with a first match on 14 June against Saudi Arabia, in which Roger Lemerre uses the 4–4–2 formation. The injury to Francileudo Santos, Tunisia's strongest striker ahead of the tournament, is of particular interest, but he is still called up to the squad. The other training interest is David Jemmali. In the opening match, with right defender Hatem Trabelsi playing in that position for years, Jemmali has a prime spot. Topping the list are Yassine Chikhaoui and Ziad Jaziri, who is playing for the second time in the World Cup. Before the match, Lemerre's Tunisia seemed to be performing better than Saudi Arabia, but it turns out that is not the case. While Tunisia launched with Ziad Jaziri's goal, Saudi Arabia managed to come back into the match and score two goals. In the last moments of the match, Tunisia managed to end the match with a draw 2–2 and a goal from Radhi Jaïdi; Lemerre said he was disappointed with the result.

In the second match, Tunisia faces Spain, the team led by Raúl, Iker Casillas, Carles Puyol and Sergio Ramos that beat Ukraine in the first round. Lemerre relies on the typical 4–5–1 defense system, with Jaziri up front. Exceptionally, Jemmali, who played as a left defender in the opening match, is replaced by his teammate Anis Ayari. Tunisia started the match strongly and scored the first goal thanks to Jawhar Mnari. However, Spain made offensive changes in the second half and Raúl and his teammates counter-attacked goalkeeper Ali Boumnijel, through whom they got the equalizer five minutes later, with Fernando Torres scoring the second goal for Spain, who won the match with a penalty in the 90th minute with a score of 3–1.

Lemerre is not satisfied with the result although he considers his tactics good. However, due to an error, Spain gets the equalizer. Lemerre also emphasizes that Tunisia must win the final match against Ukraine if they want to continue the competition. Against this, Lemerre returns to the 4–4–2 formation and, this time, its best offensive pair is made up of Jaziri and Hamed Namouchi. The match headed for a goalless draw, but the nature of the match changed when Jaziri received a second booking in the match and was sent off with a red card. To his great surprise, Lemerre did not bring up anyone as an attacker but played for more than half an hour without an attacker. Additionally, the referee announces a presumed penalty, scored by Andriy Shevchenko. Lemerre only responded after 79 minutes, when he brought on Santos and Chaouki Ben Saada. Santos has two chances in the match but fails to score. The match ultimately ended 1–0, with Tunisia once again eliminated from the group stage. After the match, Lemerre declared that he shared the disappointment with the Tunisian supporters. All that remained was for them to focus on the 2008 Africa Cup of Nations, but the Tunisian media and supporters criticized Lemerre's performance during the tournament as being too cautious and particularly defensive. At this time, Hatem Trabelsi announced his retirement from international football after eight years.

==== Group stage ====
Pos	Team	Pld	W	D	L	GF	GA	GD	Pts	Qualification
1	Spain	3	3	0	0	8	1	+7	9	Advance to knockout stage
2	Ukraine	3	2	0	1	5	4	+1	6	Advance to knockout stage
3	Tunisia	3	0	1	2	3	6	−3	1	
4	Saudi Arabia	3	0	1	2	2	7	−5	1	

Source: FIFA
Rules for classification: Tie-breaking criteria
14 June 2006
18:00

Tunisia	2–2	Saudi Arabia
Jaziri 23'; Jaïdi 90+2'	Report	Al-Qahtani 57'; Al-Jaber 84'

Allianz Arena, Munich
Attendance: 66,000
Referee: Mark Shield (Australia)

19 June 2006
21:00

Spain	3–1	Tunisia
Raúl 71'; Torres 76', 90+1' (pen.)	Report	Mnari 8'

Gottlieb-Daimler-Stadion, Stuttgart
Attendance: 52,000
Referee: Carlos Simon (Brazil)

23 June 2006
16:00

Ukraine	1–0	Tunisia
Shevchenko 70' (pen.)	Report

Olympiastadion, Berlin
Attendance: 72,000
Referee: Carlos Amarilla (Paraguay)

=== 2018 FIFA World Cup ===
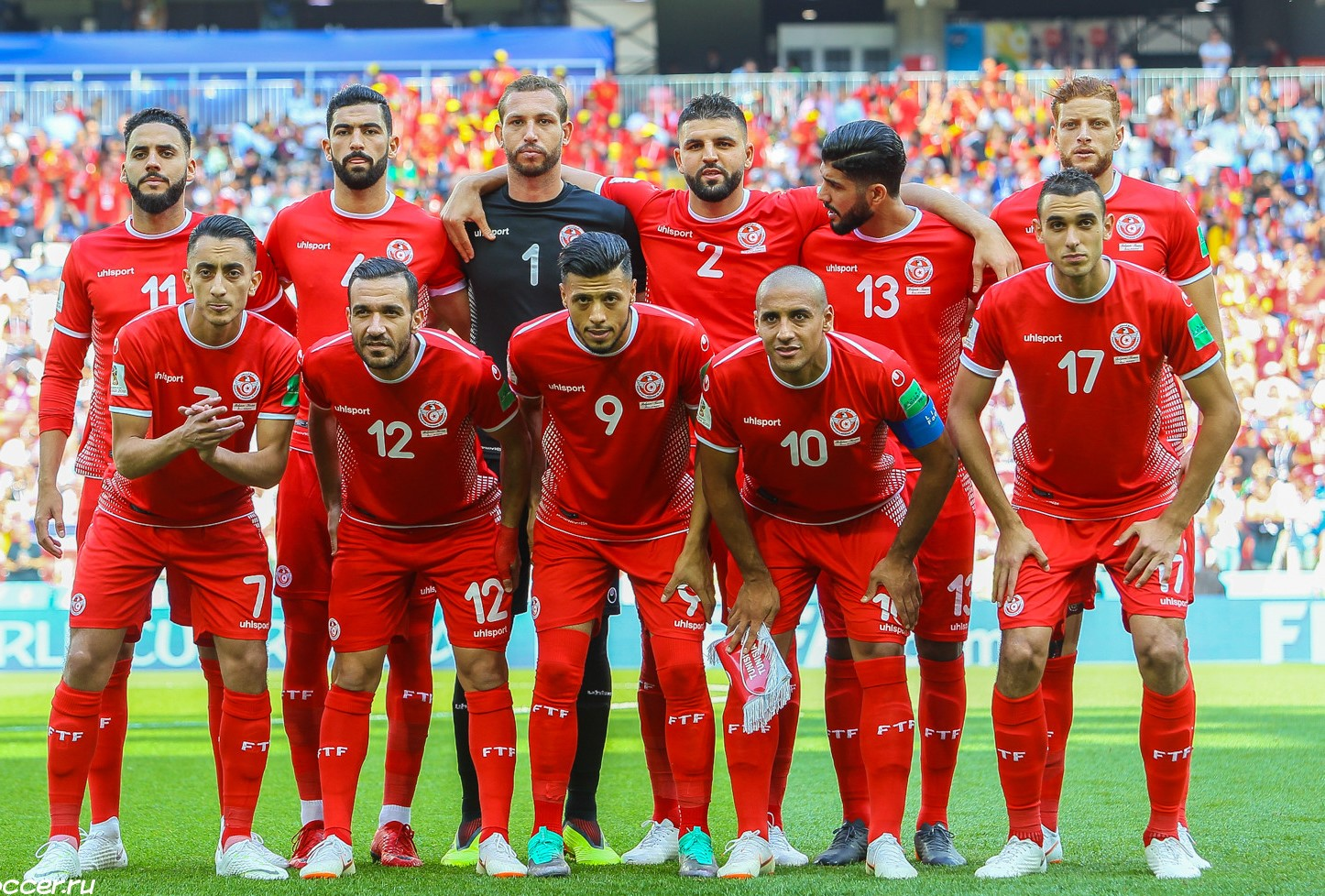
Tunisia line-up against Belgium at the 2018 FIFA World Cup in Russia.

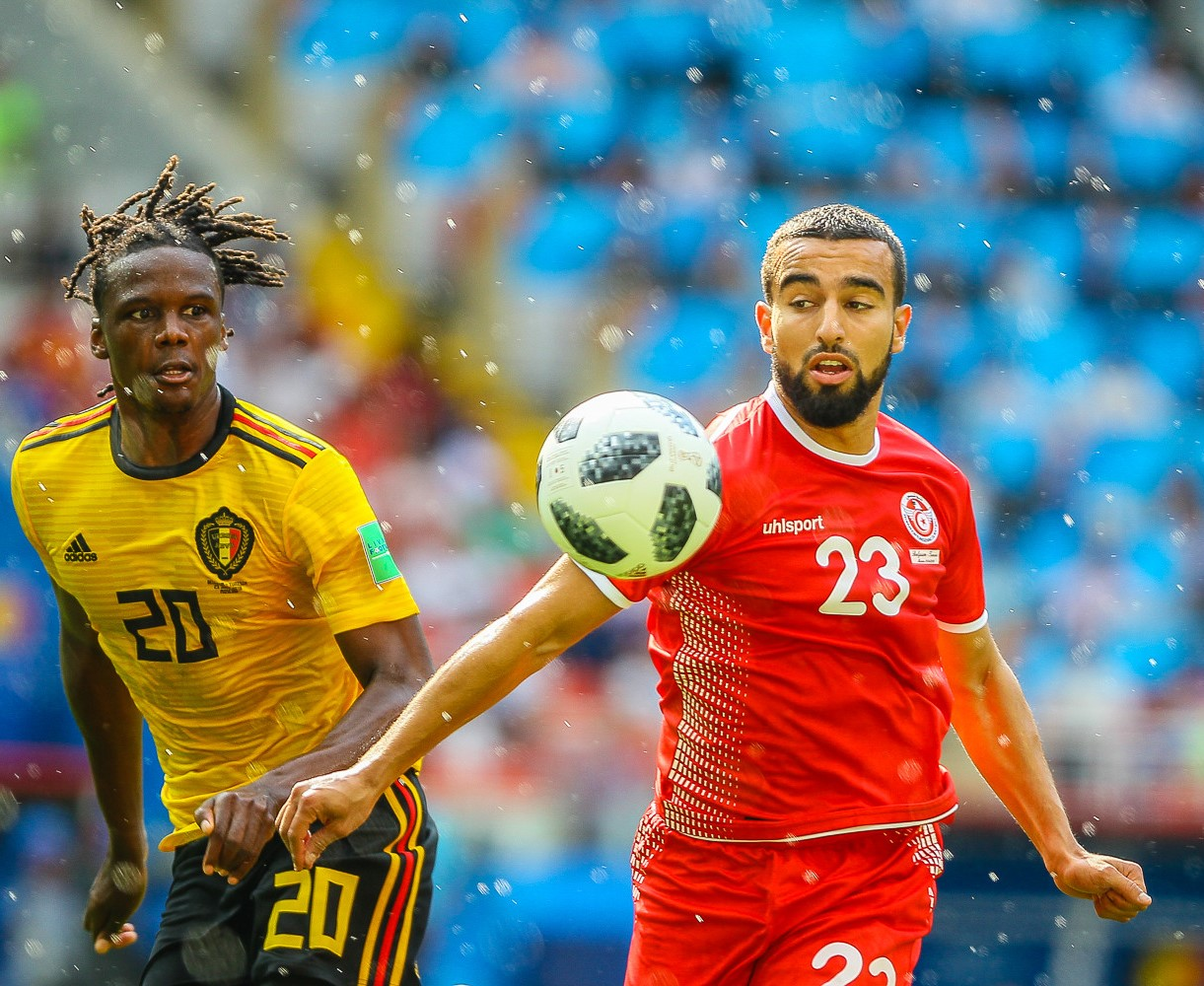
Naïm Sliti and Dedryck Boyata compete for the ball during the Tunisia and Belgium match.

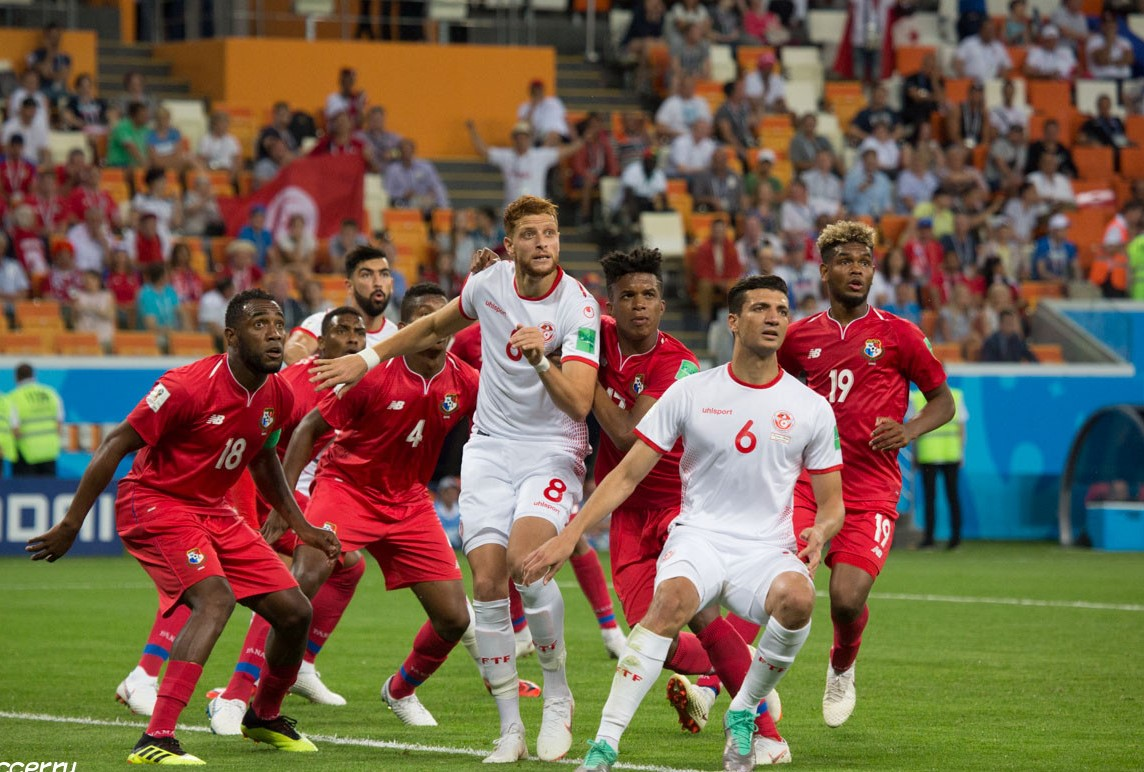
Tunisia v Panama

In the fierst match, England scored in the 11th minute when Mouez Hassen stopped a John Stones' header from a corner from the left, but could not save a Harry Kane follow-up from close range. Hassen was substituted four minutes later for Farouk Ben Mustapha due to an injury earlier in the game, after he had a collision with Jesse Lingard. Lingard then mishit a volley from Ashley Young's cross to the far post. After 10 minutes, Ferjani Sassi equalised from the penalty spot after Kyle Walker was penalised for an elbow on Fakhreddine Ben Youssef. Kane had an appeal for a penalty waved away within five minutes of the restart as he was seemingly impeded by a pair of Tunisia players at a corner. In the additional time, Harry Maguire flicked a Kieran Trippier corner from the right into the path of Kane, who headed it inside the goal after being left free at the back post. England scored more than once for the first time in 10 World Cup matches, since a 2–2 draw against Sweden in 2006. Kane became the first England player to score a brace in a World Cup match since Gary Lineker against Cameroon in 1990.

Against Belgium, Just 6 minutes into the game, Syam Ben Youssef's late challenge on Eden Hazard was deemed, with the use of VAR, to have been just inside the area and he stepped up to score the penalty into the bottom-left corner. Ten minutes later, Dries Mertens won possession just inside the Tunisia half before driving forward and passing the ball to Romelu Lukaku. Lukaku then shot a low strike across Farouk Ben Mustapha into the bottom-right corner. Wahbi Khazri's free-kick from the left was met by Dylan Bronn, who flashed a header past Thibaut Courtois. Thomas Meunier found Lukaku inside the area, which he clipped over the onrushing Mustapha. Toby Alderweireld's long pass from defence was taken on the chest by Hazard, who then rounded Mustapha to stroke into an empty net. Michy Batshuayi met Youri Tielemans' cross at the back post with a controlled half-volley to score Belgium's 5th. Khazri scored deep into stoppage time after a swivel in the box. Lukaku became the first player since Diego Maradona to score back-to-back braces in consecutive world cup games. Hazard's penalty was Belgium's second quickest goal in a World Cup match (5:59), behind only Léopold Anoul's goal against England in 1954, in the fifth minute. For Tunisia, it has registered as their worst defeat ever in their World Cup history.

For the last game, Panama took the lead in the 33rd minute, after a José Rodríguez shot from outside the penalty area took a deflection off Yassine Meriah and nestle in the back of the net. In the 51st minute, Naïm Sliti found Wahbi Khazri down the right and the latter's low cross was converted by Fakhreddine Ben Youssef just six yards out. At the 66 minute mark, Khazri finished off a cross from the left by Oussama Haddadi from close range at the back post. Tunisia won a World Cup match after 40 years, since their 3–1 victory over Mexico in 1978. Panama became the first nation since Serbia & Montenegro and Togo in 2006 to lose each of their first three World Cup games. Panama's goal means this is the first World Cup tournament in which every side has scored at least two goals in the competition. Meriah's own goal was the 50th in World Cup history.

==== Group stage ====
Pos	Team	Pld	W	D	L	GF	GA	GD	Pts	Qualification
1	Belgium	3	3	0	0	9	2	+7	9	Advance to knockout stage
2	England	3	2	0	1	8	3	+5	6	Advance to knockout stage
3	Tunisia	3	1	0	2	5	8	−3	3	
4	Panama	3	0	0	3	2	11	−9	0	

Source: FIFA
Rules for classification: Group stage tiebreakers
18 June 2018
21:00 MSK (UTC+3)

Tunisia	1–2	England
Sassi 35' (pen.)		Kane 11', 90+1'

Volgograd Arena, Volgograd
Attendance: 41,064
Referee: Wilmar Roldán (Colombia)

23 June 2018
15:00 MSK (UTC+3)

Belgium	5–2	Tunisia
E. Hazard 6' (pen.), 51'; Lukaku 16', 45+3'; Batshuayi 90'		Bronn 18'; Khazri 90+3'

Otkritie Arena, Moscow
Attendance: 44,190
Referee: Jair Marrufo (United States)

28 June 2018
21:00 MSK (UTC+3)

Panama	1–2	Tunisia
Meriah 33' (o.g.)		F. Ben Youssef 51'; Khazri 66'

Mordovia Arena, Saransk
Attendance: 37,168
Referee: Nawaf Shukralla (Bahrain)

=== 2022 FIFA World Cup ===
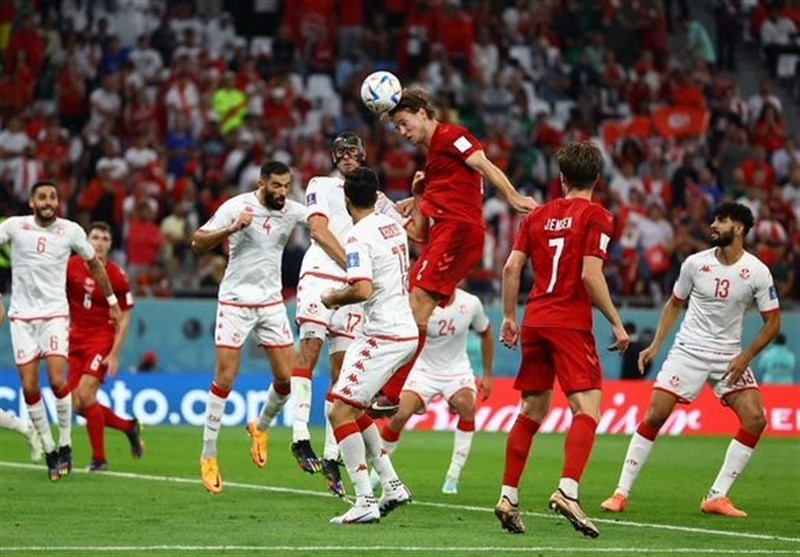
Tunisia v Denmark.

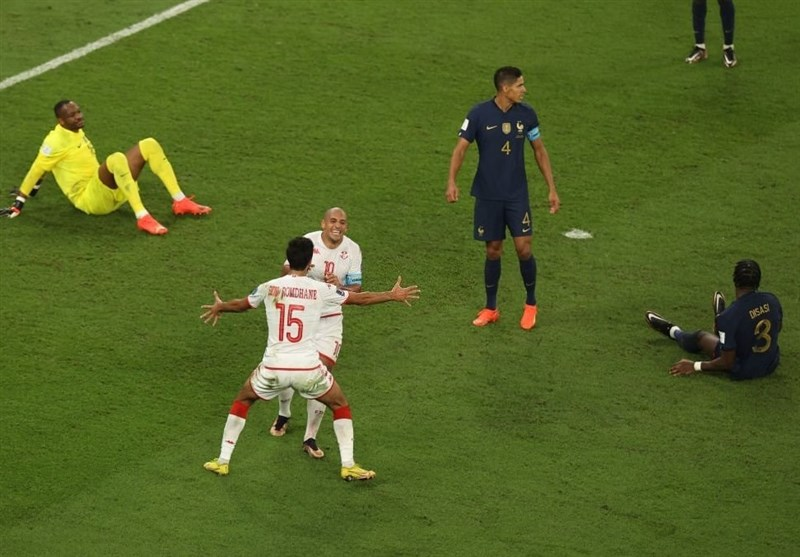
Wahbi Khazri celebrates his goal against France.

In the first match in Group D, Mohamed Dräger threatens the opponent's goal, then Issam Jebali dominates Kasper Schmeichel, but the situation is prevented by an offside. In the 43rd minute, Jebali comes face to face with Schmeichel after hitting the goal and tries to beat the goalkeeper with a through shot, but he uses his thumbs and fends off the finish. Christian Eriksen then makes an attempt beyond the goal line, but Aymen Dahmen is illustrated with a save. From the corner that follows, Andreas Cornelius wastes an opportunity by finding himself alone at the far post, but his header only seals the structure of the goals. Due to the subsequent dominance over the ball, despite their best efforts, the Danes could not find a solution against the Tunisia defence, and the match ended in a goalless draw. Thanks to his performance in this match, Aïssa Laïdouni receives the man of the match award.

In the second match, the team are led to a 1–0 loss against Australia, with the technical framework and the players receiving criticism due to the weakness of the midfield and the attack, which reduces the chances of Tunisia to qualify for the round of 16. In the final game against world champions France, Wahbi Khazri put Tunisia ahead in the 58th minute with a low shot to the bottom right corner. At this stage, Tunisia is in a position to qualify in the group. However, two minutes later, Australia took the lead against Denmark in the other match, which sent Tunisia out of the knockout stage. Captain Khazri wins the Man of the Match award. This is Tunisia's first victory against a European team in the World Cup, and the team have collected the most points (four points) in the group stage since their first appearance in 1978 FIFA World Cup (three points). In this context, Wahbi Khazri is retiring from international retirement, after 74 games in which he scored 25 goals.

==== Group stage ====
Pos	Team	Pld	W	D	L	GF	GA	GD	Pts	Qualification
1	France	3	2	0	1	6	3	+3	6	Advance to knockout stage
2	Australia	3	2	0	1	3	4	−1	6	Advance to knockout stage
3	Tunisia	3	1	1	1	1	1	0	4	
4	Denmark	3	0	1	2	1	3	−2	1	

Source: FIFA
22 November 2022
16:00

Denmark	0–0	Tunisia

Education City Stadium, Al Rayyan
Attendance: 42,925
Referee: César Arturo Ramos (Mexico)

26 November 2022
13:00

Tunisia	0–1	Australia
		Duke 23'

Al Janoub Stadium, Al Wakrah
Attendance: 41,823
Referee: Daniel Siebert (Germany)

30 November 2022
18:00

Tunisia	1–0	France
Khazri 58'

Education City Stadium, Al Rayyan
Attendance: 43,627
Referee: Matthew Conger (New Zealand)

=== 2026 FIFA World Cup ===
The team delegation arrived in Mexico on the morning of 8 June, amid uncertainty and shaken morale. In their first match against Sweden at the BBVA Stadium in Monterrey, the team appeared nervous and quickly paid the price; Yasin Ayari scored Sweden’s opening goal in the 7th minute, capitalizing on a defensive lapse caused by a lack of concentration. Alexander Isak doubled the lead in the 30th minute. Before the end of the first half, Omar Rekik narrowed the deficit with a precise header, connecting with an excellent cross from Hannibal Mejbri. This goal brought Tunisia back into the contest, and the team began the second half looking to build on that momentum—though their rather timid efforts failed to pose any real threat to the Swedish goal. However, Viktor Gyökeres dashed Tunisian hopes in the 59th minute, taking advantage of a glaring error by Ellyes Skhiri to score the third goal. Later, substitute Mattias Svanberg added Sweden’s fourth in the 84th minute, shortly after coming onto the pitch. Ayari then completed the rout with a fifth goal in stoppage time, sealing a disappointing 1–5 defeat. This result marked Tunisia’s heaviest-ever loss in a World Cup, surpassing the defeat suffered against Belgium in 2018. Following the match, Lamouchi and his entire technical staff were dismissed. This marks the second time a coach has been dismissed from his duties in the middle of a World Cup, following of Henryk Kasperczak in 1998.

A day later, an agreement was announced with French coach Hervé Renard to lead the team for the remainder of the competition. He arrived in Mexico the very next day aboard a private jet to begin his tenure. In their second match at the same venue—a game that served as the 1,000th encounter in the tournament's history, the team suffered another heavy defeat against Japan as their lackluster performance continued. Japan took an early lead through Daichi Kamada in the 4th minute; Ayase Ueda doubled the advantage in the 31st minute, Junya Itō scored the third in the 69th minute, and Ueda added a fourth in the 83rd minute. The match ended in a 4–0 defeat, resulting in Tunisia’s elimination at the group stage for the seventh time in their history.

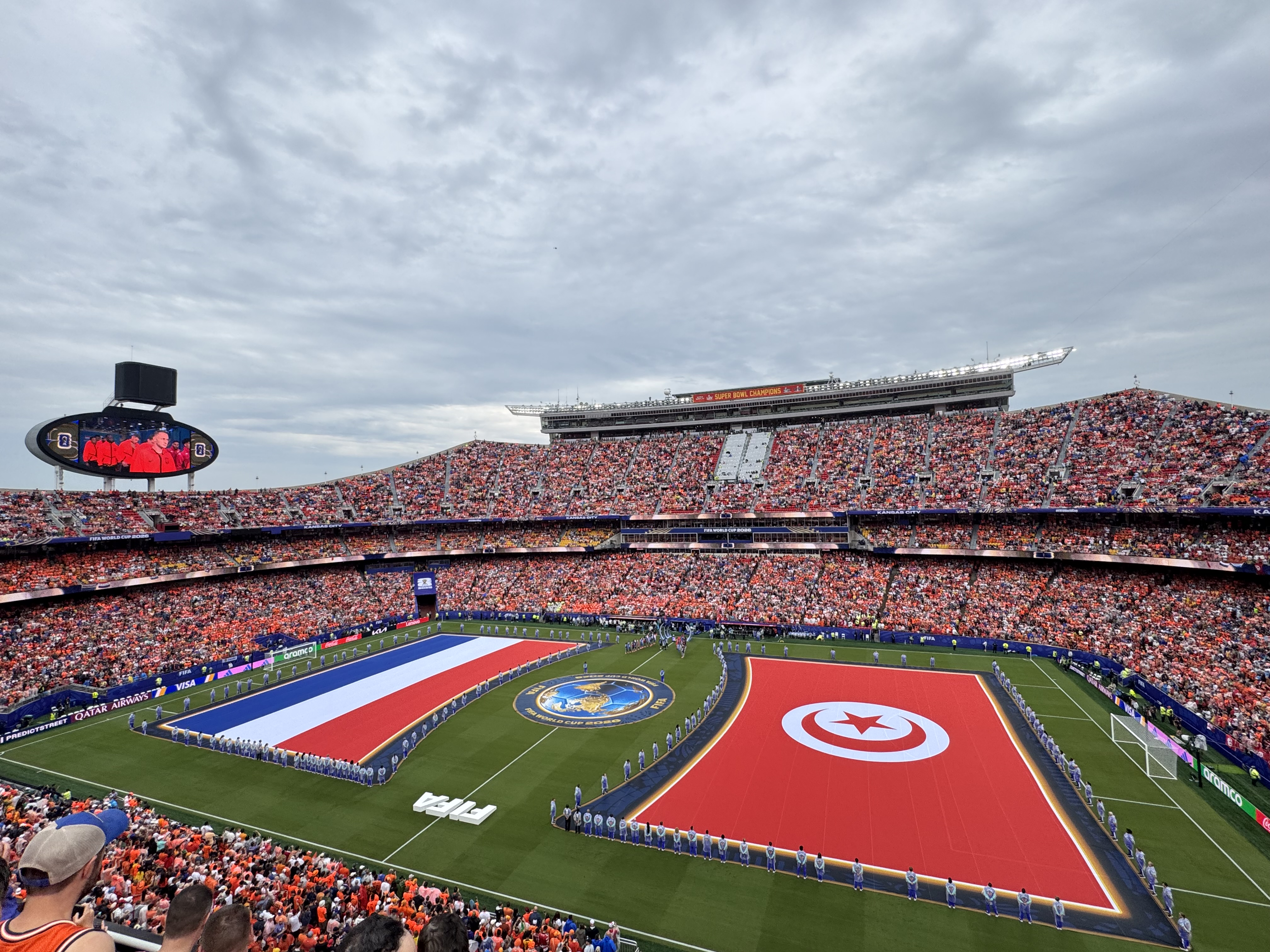
Pre-game national anthem ceremony between Netherlands and Tunisia, Group F play of the 2026 FIFA World Cup in Kansas City, Missouri.

On 23 June, the team traveled to the United States to face the Netherlands at Arrowhead Stadium in Kansas City. Although Tunisia had already been eliminated from the competition, they began the match with a highly shaky performance; Skhiri conceded a costly own goal as early as the third minute, allowing the formidable Dutch side to extend their lead, before Brian Brobbey added another goal with a strike just four minutes later. In the second half, Hazem Mastouri scored Tunisia's only goal in the 53rd minute, while Jan Paul van Hecke secured the top spot in the group for the Netherlands by scoring in the 62nd minute. The match ended in a 1–3 defeat, the team's third loss. This performance sparked intense dissatisfaction among supporters and the broader Tunisian public, directed both at the players and the leadership of the Tunisian Football Federation.

This marked Tunisia's worst-ever World Cup appearance and one of the poorest performances by any national team in the tournament's history. For the first time, Tunisia lost all three of its group-stage matches, failing to secure a single point. The team conceded 12 goals while scoring only two, resulting in a goal difference of -10 (the worst record in the tournament. This made Tunisia the Arab team that conceded the most goals, and the second African team to reach such a tally in a single World Cup edition); they also became the first African side in history to concede four or more goals in each of their first two matches. Furthermore, the team recorded its lowest-ever World Cup possession rate, at just 32%. Tunisia finished 47th out of 48 teams (ahead only of Iraq) and was the only one of the ten participating African nations that failed to qualify for the second round. On 4 July, Renard announced his departure from the team after just two matches.

==== Group stage ====
Pos	Team	Pld	W	D	L	GF	GA	GD	Pts	Qualification
1	Netherlands	3	2	1	0	10	4	+6	7	Advance to knockout stage
2	Japan	3	1	2	0	7	3	+4	5	Advance to knockout stage
3	Sweden	3	1	1	1	7	7	0	4	Advance to knockout stage
4	Tunisia	3	0	0	3	2	12	−10	0	

Source: FIFA
June 14, 2026
8:00 p.m. UTC−6

Sweden	5–1	Tunisia
Ayari 7', 90+6'; Isak 30'; Gyökeres 59'; Svanberg 84'	(Note: "Sweden vs Tunisia | First Stage | FIFA World Cup 2026". FIFA. Retrieved June 14, 2026.; " Match Report – Group F – Sweden v. Tunisia". FIFA. June 15, 2026. Retrieved June 15, 2026.; "Post match summary report – Group F – Sweden v. Tunisia". FIFA. June 14, 2026. Retrieved June 15, 2026.)	Rekik 43'

Estadio BBVA, Guadalupe
Attendance: 50,987
Referee: Yael Falcón (Argentina)

June 20, 2026
10:00 p.m. UTC−6

Tunisia	0–4	Japan
	(Note: "Tunisia vs Japan | First Stage | FIFA World Cup 2026". FIFA. Retrieved June 21, 2026.; "Match Report – Group F – Tunisia v. Japan". FIFA. June 21, 2026. Retrieved June 21, 2026.; "Post match summary report – Group F – Tunisia v. Japan". FIFA. June 21, 2026. Retrieved June 25, 2026.)	Kamada 4'; Ueda 31', 83'; J. Itō 69'

Estadio BBVA, Guadalupe
Attendance: 51,243
Referee: István Kovács (Romania)

June 25, 2026
6:00 p.m. UTC−5

Tunisia	1–3	Netherlands
Mastouri 54'	(Note: "Tunisia vs Netherlands | First Stage | FIFA World Cup 2026". FIFA. Retrieved June 26, 2026.; "Match Report – Group F – Tunisia v. Netherlands". FIFA. June 26, 2026. Retrieved June 26, 2026.; "Post match summary report – Group F – Tunisia v. Netherlands". FIFA. June 25, 2026. Retrieved June 27, 2026.)	Skhiri 3' (o.g.); Brobbey 7'; Van Hecke 62'

Arrowhead Stadium, Kansas City
Attendance: 68,391
Referee: Katia Itzel García (Mexico)

== Record by opponent ==
- – Positive balance
- – Neutral balance
- – Negative balance

Opponent	Pld	W	D	L	GF	GA	GD	First match date	Last match date
Australia	1	0	0	1	0	1	−1	26 November 2022	26 November 2022
Belgium	2	0	1	1	3	6	−3	10 June 2002	23 June 2018
Colombia	1	0	0	1	0	1	−1	22 June 1998	22 June 1998
Denmark	1	0	1	0	0	0	0	22 November 2022	22 November 2022
England	2	0	0	2	1	4	−3	15 June 1998	18 June 2018
France	1	1	0	0	1	0	+1	30 November 2022	30 November 2022
Germany	1	0	1	0	0	0	0	10 June 1978	10 June 1978
Japan	2	0	0	2	0	6	−6	14 June 2002	20 June 2026
Mexico	1	1	0	0	3	1	+2	2 June 1978	2 June 1978
Netherlands	1	0	0	1	1	3	–3	25 June 2026	25 June 2026
Panama	1	1	0	0	2	1	+1	28 June 2018	28 June 2018
Poland	1	0	0	1	0	1	−1	6 June 1978	6 June 1978
Romania	1	0	1	0	1	1	0	26 June 1998	26 June 1998
Russia	1	0	0	1	0	2	−2	5 June 2002	5 June 2002
Saudi Arabia	1	0	1	0	2	2	0	14 June 2006	14 June 2006
Spain	1	0	0	1	1	3	−2	19 June 2006	19 June 2006
Sweden	1	0	0	1	1	5	−4	14 June 2026	14 June 2026
Ukraine	1	0	0	1	0	1	−1	23 June 2006	23 June 2006
Total	21	3	5	13	15	35	−20	2 June 1978	25 June 2026

== Player records ==
As of 25 June 2026

=== Most appearances ===
Ellyes Skhiri is the Tunisian player with the most World Cup appearances, having played 9 matches.

Rank	Player	Matches	World Cups
1	Ellyes Skhiri	9	2018, 2022 and 2026
2	Riadh Bouazizi	8	1998, 2002 and 2006
2	Kaies Ghodhbane	8	1998, 2002 and 2006
4	Hatem Trabelsi	7	1998, 2002 and 2006
5	Zoubeir Baya	6	1998 and 2002
5	Ali Boumnijel	6	2002 and 2006
5	Radhi Jaïdi	6	2002 and 2006
5	Ziad Jaziri	6	2002 and 2006
5	Yassine Meriah	5	2018 and 2022
5	Ali Abdi	6	2022 and 2026
5	Montassar Talbi	6	2022 and 2026

=== Goalscorers ===
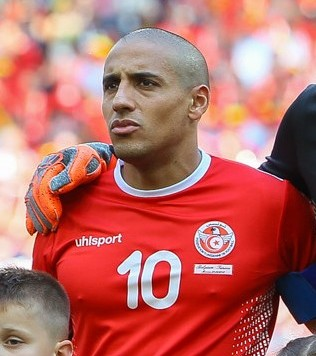
Wahbi Khazri is the Tunisian player with the most goals in the World Cup, having scored 3 times.

On 2 June 1978, Ali Kaabi made history by scoring Tunisia's first-ever FIFA World Cup goal, coming in their opening match against Mexico in Rosario.

Rank	Player	1978	1998	2002	2006	2018	2022	2026	Goals
1	Wahbi Khazri					2	1		3
2	Mokhtar Dhouieb	1							1
2	Néjib Ghommidh	1							1
2	Ali Kaabi	1							1
2	Skander Souayah		1						1
2	Raouf Bouzaiene			1					1
2	Ziad Jaziri				1				1
2	Radhi Jaïdi				1				1
2	Jawhar Mnari				1				1
2	Ferjani Sassi					1			1
2	Dylan Bronn					1			1
2	Fakhreddine Ben Youssef					1			1
2	Omar Rekik							1	1
2	Hazem Mastouri							1	1
Total		3	1	1	3	5	1	2	16

== Awards ==
Man of the match

- 2002: Raouf Bouzaiene (vs. Belgium; Group H)
- 2006: Ziad Jaziri (vs. Saudi Arabia; Group H)
- 2018: Fakhreddine Ben Youssef (vs. Panama; Group G)
- 2022: Aïssa Laïdouni (vs. Denmark; Group D)
- 2022: Wahbi Khazri (vs. France; Group D)

== Kits ==
1978 FIFA World Cup		1998 FIFA World Cup		2002 FIFA World Cup		2006 FIFA World Cup	
Home	Away	Home	Away	Home	Away	Home	Away
2018 FIFA World Cup		2022 FIFA World Cup		2026 FIFA World Cup			
Home	Away	Home	Away	Home	Away		

== Controversies ==
Threatening to be excluded from the 2022 World Cup

At the end of October 2022, an internal dispute concerning the Minister of Youth and Sports, Kamel Deguiche, and the president of the Tunisian Football Federation, Wadie Jary, threatens Tunisia's participation in the World Cup. Indeed, the two men are known to hate each other and the first wishes to dissolve the federation to separate from the second. FIFA systematically penalizes cases of interference in the world of football, it therefore warns the Tunisian federation: by means of a letter, it warns that it reserves the right to exclude Tunisia from the competition in case of taking power over the federation by Deguiche.

Allegations of interference in the 2022 World Cup squad

Dozens of news websites in Tunisia reported that coach Jalel Kadri was subjected to pressure during the formation of the Tunisian team's squad for the 2022 World Cup, according to the player Saad Bguir, who was excluded from the final list and who was on the initial list. He also announced his international retirement through a phone call on the TV program Stade Plus on Carthage Plus, until the president of the Tunisian Football Federation, Wadie Jary, left his position. It started when Bilel Ifa was excluded from the list a day before the official announcement, and was later brought back after fans outraged on social media. On 14 November 2022, hundreds of fans greeted the team bus in Doha upon their arrival, but the president of the Federation was insulted in the worst terms.

Also, the selection of four goalkeepers was under pressure from the Tunisian Football Federation to meet the wishes of certain teams on the financial level, FIFA, since the 2010 FIFA World Cup, paying a subsidy to each. team, of which at least one player has been called up in each edition of the competition. On 28 November 2022, former national team player Issam Jemâa said on Radio IFM, that FTF officials had sacrificed one of the players to call four goalkeepers into the final list, as the choice was on Bilel Ifa, who returned to the team after the anger of the fans, Taha Yassine Khenissi, who was medically examined for two hours, so they could find him injured or Seifeddine Jaziri, who was called up due to financial transactions between him and the brother of the president of the FTF, Wajih Jary. In the final, Saad Bguir was abandoned.

== See also ==
- Tunisia at the FIFA Confederations Cup
- Tunisia at the Africa Cup of Nations
- Tunisia at the African Nations Championship
- Tunisia at the FIFA Arab Cup
- African nations at the FIFA World Cup
