= Karoui =

Karoui is a surname. Notable people with the surname include:

- Fayçal Karoui (born 1971), conductor of Tunisian descent
- Hamed Karoui (1927–2020), Tunisian politician
- Nabil Karoui (born 1963), Tunisian businessman and politician
- Sahbi Karoui, Tunisian politician
- Slah Karoui (born 1951), Tunisian footballer
