= 2022 FIFA World Cup Group D =

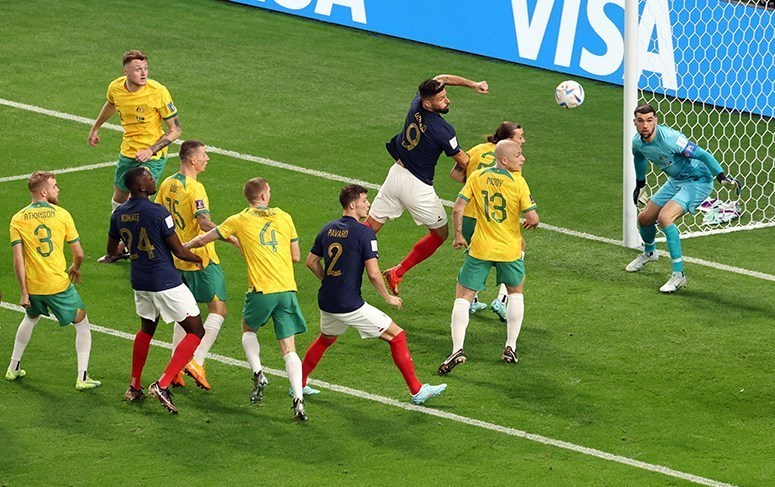
France vs Australia

Group D of the 2022 FIFA World Cup took place from 22 to 30 November 2022. The group consisted of national association football teams France, Australia, Denmark and Tunisia. The top two teams, France and Australia advanced to the round of 16. France won the group by goal difference, defeating Australia and Denmark before losing to Tunisia on the final matchday. Australia finished second and made to the first knockout stage since 2006.

== Teams ==
The teams were decided by the World Cup draw that took place on 1 April 2022. The group was set to receive one team from each pot, which sorted all World Cup teams by position on the FIFA World Rankings.

Australia, Denmark and France were also in Group C of the previous World Cup.

Draw position	Team	Pot	Confederation	Method of qualification	Date of qualification	Finals appearance	Last appearance	Previous best performance	FIFA Rankings	
Draw position	Team	Pot	Confederation	Method of qualification	Date of qualification	Finals appearance	Last appearance	Previous best performance	March 2022 (Note: The rankings of March 2022 were used for seeding for the final draw.)	October 2022
D1	France	1	UEFA	UEFA Group D winners	13 November 2021	16th	2018	Winners (1998, 2018)	3	4
D2	Australia	4 (Note: As the identity of the AFC v CONMEBOL play-off winners was not known at the time of the final draw, positions in the FIFA Rankings were not taken into account, and the placeholder in the draw was automatically seeded into pot 4.)	AFC	AFC v CONMEBOL play-off winners	13 June 2022	6th	2018	Round of 16 (2006)	42	38
D3	Denmark	2	UEFA	UEFA Group F winners	12 October 2021	6th	2018	Quarter-finals (1998)	11	10
D4	Tunisia	3	CAF	CAF third round winners	29 March 2022	6th	2018	Group stage (1978, 1998, 2002, 2006, 2018)	35	30

== Standings ==
Pos	Team	Pld	W	D	L	GF	GA	GD	Pts	Qualification
1	France	3	2	0	1	6	3	+3	6	Advance to knockout stage
2	Australia	3	2	0	1	3	4	−1	6	Advance to knockout stage
3	Tunisia	3	1	1	1	1	1	0	4	
4	Denmark	3	0	1	2	1	3	−2	1	

Source: FIFA
Rules for classification: Group stage tiebreakers

In the round of 16:

- The winners of Group D, France, advanced to play the runners-up of Group C, Poland.
- The runners-up of Group D, Australia, advanced to play the winners of Group C, Argentina.

== Matches ==
Matches took place from 22 to 30 November 2022. All times listed are local, AST (UTC+3).

=== Denmark vs Tunisia ===
The teams had faced each other twice, most recently in 2002, a 2–1 win for Denmark in a friendly game.

Denmark were not able to capitalize in their opening game, with Andreas Cornelius heading onto the post in the 70th minute. Although Tunisia failed to score themselves, midfielder Aïssa Laïdouni earned the Man of the Match award for his defensive heroics.

22 November 2022
16:00

Denmark	0–0	Tunisia

Education City Stadium, Al Rayyan
Attendance: 42,925
Referee: César Arturo Ramos (Mexico)

Denmark	Tunisia

GK	1	Kasper Schmeichel
CB	2	Joachim Andersen
CB	4	Simon Kjær (c)		(substituted off) 65'
CB	6	Andreas Christensen
DM	8	Thomas Delaney		(substituted off) 45+1'
CM	23	Pierre-Emile Højbjerg
CM	10	Christian Eriksen
RW	13	Rasmus Kristensen	(yellow card) 24'
LW	5	Joakim Mæhle
CF	11	Andreas Skov Olsen		(substituted off) 65'
CF	12	Kasper Dolberg		(substituted off) 65'
Substitutions:
MF	14	Mikkel Damsgaard		(substituted on) 45+1'
FW	21	Andreas Cornelius		(substituted on) 65'
MF	7	Mathias Jensen	(yellow card) 78'	(substituted on) 65'
MF	25	Jesper Lindstrøm		(substituted on) 65'
Manager:
Kasper Hjulmand

GK	16	Aymen Dahmen
CB	6	Dylan Bronn
CB	4	Yassine Meriah
CB	3	Montassar Talbi
RM	20	Mohamed Dräger		(substituted off) 88'
CM	17	Ellyes Skhiri
CM	14	Aïssa Laïdouni		(substituted off) 88'
LM	24	Ali Abdi
AM	25	Anis Ben Slimane		(substituted off) 67'
AM	7	Youssef Msakni (c)		(substituted off) 80'
CF	9	Issam Jebali		(substituted off) 80'
Substitutions:
FW	23	Naïm Sliti		(substituted on) 67'
MF	8	Hannibal Mejbri		(substituted on) 80'
FW	11	Taha Yassine Khenissi	(yellow card) 86'	(substituted on) 80'
DF	21	Wajdi Kechrida		(substituted on) 88'
MF	13	Ferjani Sassi		(substituted on) 88'
Manager:
Jalel Kadri

Man of the Match:
Aïssa Laïdouni (Tunisia)

Assistant referees:
Alberto Morín (Mexico)
Miguel Hernández (Mexico)
Fourth official:
Saíd Martínez (Honduras)
Reserve assistant referee:
Walter López (Honduras)
Video assistant referee:
Fernando Guerrero (Mexico)
Assistant video assistant referees:
Armando Villarreal (United States)
Gabriel Chade (Argentina)
Juan Martínez Munuera (Spain)
Stand-by assistant video assistant referee:
Mahmoud Abouelregal (Egypt)

=== France vs Australia ===
The teams had previously faced each other five times, including once in the World Cup, a 2–1 France victory in 2018 en route to the title. They also met in Australia's 1–0 win against the reigning world champions (having previously won the 1998 World Cup) at the 2001 FIFA Confederations Cup.

Craig Goodwin gave Australia the lead in the ninth minute, when he finished at the back post high into the net after a low cross from the right by Mathew Leckie. Adrien Rabiot equalized for France when he headed to the net from a Théo Hernandez cross from the left. France took the lead five minutes later after Olivier Giroud's side footed shot found the back of the net from a low cross from Rabiot from the left. Jackson Irvine had a chance to equalize in first half stoppage time, but headed onto the post. In the 68th minute, Kylian Mbappé scored France's third goal with a header from six yards out to the left corner, after a cross from Ousmane Dembélé on the right. Giroud got his second with another header after a Mbappé cross from the left to make it 4–1.

Giroud's second goal equalled Thierry Henry's all-time scoring record of 51 goals for France. France's win marked the first time since 2006 that the defending World Cup champions won their opening game. On the other hand, Goodwin's goal was the fastest France had conceded in the tournament since 1982.

French defender Lucas Hernandez suffered a torn ACL after 13 minutes of the match, ruling him out for the remainder of the tournament. He would be substituted by his brother Théo during the match.

22 November 2022
22:00

France	4–1	Australia
Rabiot 27'; Giroud 32', 71'; Mbappé 68'		Goodwin 9'

Al Janoub Stadium, Al Wakrah
Attendance: 40,875
Referee: Victor Gomes (South Africa)

France	Australia

GK	1	Hugo Lloris (c)
RB	2	Benjamin Pavard	(substituted off) 89'
CB	18	Dayot Upamecano
CB	24	Ibrahima Konaté
LB	21	Lucas Hernandez	(substituted off) 13'
CM	14	Adrien Rabiot
CM	8	Aurélien Tchouaméni	(substituted off) 77'
RW	11	Ousmane Dembélé	(substituted off) 77'
AM	7	Antoine Griezmann
LW	10	Kylian Mbappé
CF	9	Olivier Giroud	(substituted off) 89'
Substitutions:
DF	22	Théo Hernandez	(substituted on) 13'
MF	13	Youssouf Fofana	(substituted on) 77'
FW	20	Kingsley Coman	(substituted on) 77'
DF	5	Jules Koundé	(substituted on) 89'
FW	26	Marcus Thuram	(substituted on) 89'
Manager:
Didier Deschamps

GK	1	Mathew Ryan (c)
RB	3	Nathaniel Atkinson		(substituted off) 85'
CB	19	Harry Souttar
CB	4	Kye Rowles
LB	16	Aziz Behich
DM	13	Aaron Mooy	(yellow card) 90+5'
RM	23	Craig Goodwin		(substituted off) 73'
CM	14	Riley McGree		(substituted off) 73'
CM	22	Jackson Irvine	(yellow card) 80'	(substituted off) 85'
LM	7	Mathew Leckie
CF	15	Mitch Duke	(yellow card) 55'	(substituted off) 56'
Substitutions:
FW	25	Jason Cummings		(substituted on) 56'
FW	11	Awer Mabil		(substituted on) 73'
FW	21	Garang Kuol		(substituted on) 73'
MF	26	Keanu Baccus		(substituted on) 85'
DF	2	Miloš Degenek		(substituted on) 85'
Manager:
Graham Arnold

Man of the Match:
Kylian Mbappé (France)

Assistant referees:
Zakhele Siwela (South Africa)
Souru Phatsoane (Lesotho)
Fourth official:
Salima Mukansanga (Rwanda)
Reserve assistant referee:
Kathryn Nesbitt (United States)
Video assistant referee:
Drew Fischer (Canada)
Assistant video assistant referees:
Adil Zourak (Morocco)
Kyle Atkins (United States)
Marco Fritz (Germany)
Stand-by assistant video assistant referee:
Corey Parker (United States)

=== Tunisia vs Australia ===
The teams had previously faced each other twice, most recently in Tunisia's 2–0 win at the 2005 FIFA Confederations Cup.

Australia beat Tunisia 1–0 as a result of a Mitch Duke header in the 23rd minute to secure their first win in a World Cup match since they defeated Serbia 2–1 in 2010. This was also Australia's first clean sheet since they drew 0–0 with Chile in 1974.

26 November 2022
13:00

Tunisia	0–1	Australia
		Duke 23'

Al Janoub Stadium, Al Wakrah
Attendance: 41,823
Referee: Daniel Siebert (Germany)

Tunisia	Australia

GK	16	Aymen Dahmen
CB	6	Dylan Bronn		(substituted off) 73'
CB	4	Yassine Meriah
CB	3	Montassar Talbi
RM	20	Mohamed Dräger		(substituted off) 46'
CM	17	Ellyes Skhiri
CM	14	Aïssa Laïdouni	(yellow card) 26'	(substituted off) 67'
LM	24	Ali Abdi	(yellow card) 64'
AM	23	Naïm Sliti
AM	7	Youssef Msakni (c)
CF	9	Issam Jebali		(substituted off) 73'
Substitutions:
MF	13	Ferjani Sassi	(yellow card) 90+3'	(substituted on) 46'
FW	10	Wahbi Khazri		(substituted on) 67'
DF	21	Wajdi Kechrida		(substituted on) 73'
FW	11	Taha Yassine Khenissi		(substituted on) 73'
Manager:
Jalel Kadri

GK	1	Mathew Ryan (c)
RB	5	Fran Karačić	(substituted off) 75'
CB	19	Harry Souttar
CB	4	Kye Rowles
LB	16	Aziz Behich
DM	13	Aaron Mooy
CM	22	Jackson Irvine
CM	14	Riley McGree	(substituted off) 64'
RF	7	Mathew Leckie	(substituted off) 85'
CF	15	Mitch Duke	(substituted off) 64'
LF	23	Craig Goodwin	(substituted off) 85'
Substitutions:
FW	9	Jamie Maclaren	(substituted on) 64'
MF	10	Ajdin Hrustic	(substituted on) 64'
DF	2	Miloš Degenek	(substituted on) 75'
FW	11	Awer Mabil	(substituted on) 85'
MF	26	Keanu Baccus	(substituted on) 85'
Manager:
Graham Arnold

Man of the Match:
Mitch Duke (Australia)

Assistant referees:
Rafael Foltyn (Germany)
Jan Seidel (Germany)
Fourth official:
Saíd Martínez (Honduras)
Reserve assistant referee:
Karen Díaz Medina (Mexico)
Video assistant referee:
Bastian Dankert (Germany)
Assistant video assistant referees:
Marco Fritz (Germany)
Corey Parker (United States)
Pol van Boekel (Netherlands)
Stand-by assistant video assistant referee:
Kathryn Nesbitt (United States)

=== France vs Denmark ===
The teams had met 16 times previously including thrice in the World Cup, all in the group stage with three different results; France won 2–1 in 1998, Denmark won 2–0 in 2002 and the teams drew 0–0 in 2018.

Kylian Mbappé scored two goals either side of an Andreas Christensen equalizer to secure France a 2–1 win and qualify them for the knockout stage, thus becoming the first defending champions since Brazil in 2006 to advance past the first round. Among European countries, they were the first World Cup holders to qualify for the knockout stage since Germany in 1994.

26 November 2022
19:00

France	2–1	Denmark
Mbappé 61', 86'		A. Christensen 68'

Stadium 974, Doha
Attendance: 42,860
Referee: Szymon Marciniak (Poland)

France	Denmark

GK	1	Hugo Lloris (c)
RB	5	Jules Koundé	(yellow card) 43'
CB	4	Raphaël Varane		(substituted off) 75'
CB	18	Dayot Upamecano
LB	22	Théo Hernandez
CM	8	Aurélien Tchouaméni
CM	14	Adrien Rabiot
RW	11	Ousmane Dembélé		(substituted off) 75'
AM	7	Antoine Griezmann		(substituted off) 90+3'
LW	10	Kylian Mbappé
CF	9	Olivier Giroud		(substituted off) 63'
Substitutions:
FW	26	Marcus Thuram		(substituted on) 63'
FW	20	Kingsley Coman		(substituted on) 75'
DF	24	Ibrahima Konaté		(substituted on) 75'
MF	13	Youssouf Fofana		(substituted on) 90+3'
Manager:
Didier Deschamps

GK	1	Kasper Schmeichel (c)
CB	2	Joachim Andersen
CB	6	Andreas Christensen	(yellow card) 20'
CB	3	Victor Nelsson
RM	13	Rasmus Kristensen		(substituted off) 90+2'
CM	23	Pierre-Emile Højbjerg
CM	10	Christian Eriksen
LM	5	Joakim Mæhle
RW	25	Jesper Lindstrøm		(substituted off) 85'
LW	14	Mikkel Damsgaard		(substituted off) 73'
CF	21	Andreas Cornelius	(yellow card) 23'	(substituted off) 46'
Substitutions:
FW	9	Martin Braithwaite		(substituted on) 46'
FW	12	Kasper Dolberg		(substituted on) 73'
MF	15	Christian Nørgaard		(substituted on) 85'
DF	26	Alexander Bah		(substituted on) 90+2'
Manager:
Kasper Hjulmand

Man of the Match:
Kylian Mbappé (France)

Assistant referees:
Paweł Sokolnicki (Poland)
Tomasz Listkiewicz (Poland)
Fourth official:
Ma Ning (China)
Reserve assistant referee:
Cao Yi (China)
Video assistant referee:
Tomasz Kwiatkowski (Poland)
Assistant video assistant referees:
Juan Martínez Munuera (Spain)
Taleb Al-Marri (Qatar)
Alejandro Hernández Hernández (Spain)
Stand-by assistant video assistant referee:
Mohamed Al-Hammadi (United Arab Emirates)

=== Australia vs Denmark ===
The teams had met in 4 previous encounters including once in the World Cup, a 1–1 draw in 2018.

Australia won the game 1–0 to finish second in the group. The only goal of the match was scored by Mathew Leckie in the 60th minute with a low left-foot finish to the bottom right corner of the net. This result meant that Australia progressed to the knockout stage for the second time in their World Cup history, the first time since 2006 and the first time they did it as a member of the AFC. This was also the first time that Australia had won two consecutive matches, scored in every group stage game, and kept a clean sheet twice in a World Cup.

30 November 2022
18:00

Australia	1–0	Denmark
Leckie 60'

Al Janoub Stadium, Al Wakrah
Attendance: 41,232
Referee: Mustapha Ghorbal (Algeria)

Australia	Denmark

GK	1	Mathew Ryan (c)
RB	2	Miloš Degenek	(yellow card) 57'
CB	19	Harry Souttar
CB	4	Kye Rowles
LB	16	Aziz Behich	(yellow card) 4'
RM	7	Mathew Leckie		(substituted off) 89'
CM	13	Aaron Mooy
CM	22	Jackson Irvine
LM	23	Craig Goodwin		(substituted off) 46'
CF	14	Riley McGree		(substituted off) 74'
CF	15	Mitch Duke		(substituted off) 82'
Substitutions:
MF	26	Keanu Baccus		(substituted on) 46'
DF	8	Bailey Wright		(substituted on) 74'
FW	9	Jamie Maclaren		(substituted on) 82'
MF	10	Ajdin Hrustic		(substituted on) 89'
Manager:
Graham Arnold

GK	1	Kasper Schmeichel
RB	13	Rasmus Kristensen		(substituted off) 46'
CB	2	Joachim Andersen
CB	6	Andreas Christensen
LB	5	Joakim Mæhle		(substituted off) 69'
DM	23	Pierre-Emile Højbjerg
CM	7	Mathias Jensen		(substituted off) 59'
CM	10	Christian Eriksen (c)
RF	11	Andreas Skov Olsen		(substituted off) 69'
CF	9	Martin Braithwaite		(substituted off) 59'
LF	25	Jesper Lindstrøm
Substitutions:
DF	26	Alexander Bah		(substituted on) 46'
FW	12	Kasper Dolberg		(substituted on) 59'
MF	14	Mikkel Damsgaard		(substituted on) 59'
MF	24	Robert Skov	(yellow card) 75'	(substituted on) 69'
FW	21	Andreas Cornelius		(substituted on) 69'
Manager:
Kasper Hjulmand

Man of the Match:
Mathew Leckie (Australia)

Assistant referees:
Mokrane Gourari (Algeria)
Abdelhak Etchiali (Algeria)
Fourth official:
Maguette Ndiaye (Senegal)
Reserve assistant referee:
Djibril Camara (Senegal)
Video assistant referee:
Mauro Vigliano (Argentina)
Assistant video assistant referees:
Nicolás Gallo (Colombia)
Gabriel Chade (Argentina)
Adil Zourak (Morocco)
Stand-by assistant video assistant referee:
Ezequiel Brailovsky (Argentina)

=== Tunisia vs France ===
The two teams had faced each other four times, most recently in 2010 friendly, a 1–1 draw.

A Tunisian goal in the 8th minute was disallowed for offside, but Wahbi Khazri put Tunisia into the lead in the 58th minute with a low shot to the bottom right corner. At that stage, Tunisia was in a position to qualify from the group. However, two minutes later Australia went in front against Denmark in the other match taking place at the same time, which put Tunisia outside of the qualifying positions. In added time, Antoine Griezmann seemingly scored to make it 1–1 for France with a volley, but the goal was ruled out by the VAR for offside, despite the ball having come off a Tunisian player just before. Australia went on to beat Denmark, which meant that Tunisia finished third in the group and failed to reach the knockout stage for the sixth consecutive World Cup.

Viewers tuning in to French television for the match missed that the French team had lost the game 1–0. TF1 switched to an ad after Griezmann had seemingly levelled the game late in stoppage time, causing French viewers to miss the pitchside monitor consultation that led VAR to rule that Griezmann had been offside. French football supporters awoke in shock the following morning to belatedly discover that the game had not ended in a draw at all, but in a surprise defeat for the reigning world champions. The incident brought to mind the time British broadcaster ITV cut for an ad break and missed Steven Gerrard scoring England's opening goal at the 2010 FIFA World Cup.

30 November 2022
18:00

Tunisia	1–0	France
Khazri 58'

Education City Stadium, Al Rayyan
Attendance: 43,627
Referee: Matthew Conger (New Zealand)

Tunisia	France

GK	16	Aymen Dahmen
CB	4	Yassine Meriah
CB	5	Nader Ghandri
CB	3	Montassar Talbi
RM	21	Wajdi Kechrida	(yellow card) 28'
CM	17	Ellyes Skhiri
CM	14	Aïssa Laïdouni
LM	12	Ali Maâloul
RW	25	Anis Ben Slimane		(substituted off) 83'
LW	15	Mohamed Ali Ben Romdhane		(substituted off) 74'
CF	10	Wahbi Khazri (c)		(substituted off) 60'
Substitutions:
FW	9	Issam Jebali		(substituted on) 60'
MF	18	Ghailene Chaalali		(substituted on) 74'
DF	24	Ali Abdi		(substituted on) 83'
Manager:
Jalel Kadri

GK	16	Steve Mandanda
RB	3	Axel Disasi
CB	4	Raphaël Varane (c)	(substituted off) 63'
CB	24	Ibrahima Konaté
LB	25	Eduardo Camavinga
RM	13	Youssouf Fofana	(substituted off) 73'
CM	8	Aurélien Tchouaméni
CM	15	Jordan Veretout	(substituted off) 63'
LM	6	Mattéo Guendouzi	(substituted off) 79'
CF	20	Kingsley Coman	(substituted off) 63'
CF	12	Randal Kolo Muani
Substitutions:
DF	17	William Saliba	(substituted on) 63'
FW	10	Kylian Mbappé	(substituted on) 63'
MF	14	Adrien Rabiot	(substituted on) 63'
FW	7	Antoine Griezmann	(substituted on) 73'
FW	11	Ousmane Dembélé	(substituted on) 79'
Manager:
Didier Deschamps

Man of the Match:
Wahbi Khazri (Tunisia)

Assistant referees:
Mark Rule (New Zealand)
Tevita Makasini (Tonga)
Fourth official:
Salima Mukansanga (Rwanda)
Reserve assistant referee:
Neuza Back (Brazil)
Video assistant referee:
Abdulla Al-Marri (Qatar)
Assistant video assistant referees:
Muhammad Taqi (Singapore)
Taleb Al-Marri (Qatar)
Fernando Guerrero (Mexico)
Stand-by assistant video assistant referee:
Saud Al-Maqaleh (Qatar)

== Discipline ==
Fair play points would have been used as tiebreakers if the overall and head-to-head records of teams were tied. These were calculated based on yellow and red cards received in all group matches as follows:

- first yellow card: −1 point;
- indirect red card (second yellow card): −3 points;
- direct red card: −4 points;
- yellow card and direct red card: −5 points;

Only one of the above deductions was applied to a player in a single match.

Team	Match 1				Match 2				Match 3				Points
Team	Booked	(yellow card) (yellow-red card)	Sent off (straight red)	(yellow card) (red card)	Booked	(yellow card) (yellow-red card)	Sent off (straight red)	(yellow card) (red card)	Booked	(yellow card) (yellow-red card)	Sent off (straight red)	(yellow card) (red card)	Points
France					1								–1
Australia	3								2				–5
Denmark	2				2				1				–5
Tunisia	1				3				1				–5

== See also ==
- Australia at the FIFA World Cup
- Denmark at the FIFA World Cup
- France at the FIFA World Cup
- Tunisia at the FIFA World Cup
