= Pedro Soto (footballer) =

Mexican footballer (born 1952)

Personal information
- Full name: Pedro Soto Moreno
- Date of birth: 22 October 1952 (age 74)
- Place of birth: Mexico
- Height: 1.78 m (5 ft 10 in)
- Position: Goalkeeper

Senior career*
Years	Team	Apps	(Gls)
1974–1975	América		
1975–1976	Santos Laguna		
1976–1981	América		
1981–1982	Atletas		
1982–1984	Puebla		

International career
1978	Mexico	3	(0)
- * Club domestic league appearances and goals

Pedro Soto Moreno (born 22 October 1952) is a Mexican former football league goalkeeper.

== Career ==
He played for Mexico in the 1978 FIFA World Cup. He also played for Club América.
