= Bohdan Masztaler =

Polish footballer (born 1949)

Personal information
- Full name: Bohdan Mieczysław Masztaler
- Date of birth: 19 September 1949 (age 77)
- Place of birth: Ostróda, Poland
- Height: 1.73 m (5 ft 8 in)
- Positions: Midfielder; forward

Youth career
- 1962–1967: Warmia Olsztyn

Senior career*
Years	Team	Apps	(Gls)
1967–1974	Gwardia Warsaw	115	(18)
1974–1977	Odra Opole		
1977–1978	ŁKS Łódź		
1978–1980	Gwardia Warsaw	25	(1)
1980–1981	Werder Bremen	3	(0)
1981–1984	Wiener Sport-Club		
1984–1989	SC Zwettl		
1989	FC Sankt Veit		
1990–1991	SV Waidhofen an der Thaya		

International career
1970–1978	Poland	22	(2)

Managerial career
- 1996–1998: SV Stockerau
- 1999: SKN St. Pölten
- * Club domestic league appearances and goals

Bohdan Mieczysław Masztaler (born 19 September 1949) is a Polish former footballer. During his club career he played for Gwardia Warsaw, Odra Opole, ŁKS Łódź and SV Werder Bremen. He earned 22 caps for the Poland national team, and participated in the 1978 FIFA World Cup.

He coached SV Stockerau and SKN St. Pölten.
