= Aymen Dahmen =

Tunisian footballer

Personal information
- Full name: Aymen Dahmen
- Date of birth: 28 January 1997 (age 29)
- Place of birth: Sfax, Tunisia
- Height: 1.88 m (6 ft 2 in)
- Position: Goalkeeper

Team information
- Current team: CS Sfaxien
- Number: 30

Senior career*
Years	Team	Apps	(Gls)
2018–2023	CS Sfaxien	156	(0)
2023–2024	Al-Hazem	25	(0)
2024–	CS Sfaxien	42	(0)

International career^{‡}
2018–2019	Tunisia U23	13	(0)
2021–	Tunisia	39	(0)
- * Club domestic league appearances and goals as of 10 January 2026 ‡ National team caps and goals as of 26 June 2026

Aymen Dahmen (Arabic: أَيْمَن دَحمَان; born 28 January 1997) is a Tunisian professional footballer who plays as a goalkeeper for CS Sfaxien and the Tunisia national team.

== Club career ==
Dahmen made his professional debut with CS Sfaxien in a 2–0 Tunisian Ligue Professionnelle 1 win over ES Métlaoui on 16 September 2018.

On 11 June 2023, Dahmen joined Saudi Pro League club Al-Hazem on a two-year contract.

On 22 July 2024, Dahmen returned to CS Sfaxien.

== International career ==
Dahmen was called up to represent the Tunisia U23 national team for 2019 Africa U-23 Cup of Nations qualification matches.

He made his debut for senior national team on 28 March 2021 in an AFCON 2021 qualifier against Equatorial Guinea in the first half of the match.

On 10 June 2022, Dahmen played for the whole match in the 2022 Kirin Cup Soccer semi-final 2–0 victory against Chile in which he denied Diego Valencia's penalty kick during the second half injury time.

On 14 November 2022, he was selected by Jalel Kadri to participate in the 2022 FIFA World Cup.

On 15 May 2026, Dahmen was named in the Tunisia squad for the 2026 FIFA World Cup.

== Honours ==
CS Sfaxien

- Tunisian Cup: 2018–19, 2020–21, 2021–22

Tunisia

- Kirin Cup Soccer: 2022
