= Khaled Gasmi =

Tunisian footballer

Personal information
- Date of birth: 8 April 1953 (age 73)
- Place of birth: Bizerte, Tunisia
- Position: Midfielder

Senior career*
Years	Team	Apps	(Gls)
1971–1980	Club Athlétique Bizertin	226	(56)
1980–1984	AS Ariana	95	(17)
Total		321	(73)

International career
1972–1980	Tunisia	55	(1)
- * Club domestic league appearances and goals

Khaled Gasmi (born 8 April 1953) is a Tunisian former football midfielder who played for Club Athlétique Bizertin and the Tunisia national team. He was part of Tunisia's squad in the 1978 FIFA World Cup.
