= José Pilar Reyes =

Mexican footballer (born 1955)

Personal information
- Full name: José Pilar Reyes Requenes
- Date of birth: 12 October 1955 (age 71)
- Place of birth: Aguascalientes, Mexico
- Height: 1.70 m (5 ft 7 in)
- Position: Goalkeeper

Senior career*
Years	Team	Apps	(Gls)
1974–1977	San Luis	38	(0)
1977–1983	Tigres UANL	173	(0)
1983–1986	Tampico Madero	44	(0)
1986–1987	Tigres UANL	12	(0)
1987–1988	Monterrey	22	(0)
Total		289	(0)

International career
1977–1981	Mexico	20	(0)
- * Club domestic league appearances and goals

José Pilar Reyes Requenes (born 12 October 1955) is a Mexican former football goalkeeper who played for Mexico in the 1978 FIFA World Cup. He also played for Tigres UANL.
