= Rigoberto Cisneros =

Mexican footballer (born 1953)

Personal information
- Full name: Rigoberto Cisneros Dueñas
- Date of birth: 15 August 1953 (age 73)
- Place of birth: Mexico City, Mexico
- Position: Defender

Senior career*
| Years | Team | Apps | (Gls) |
| 1974–1978 | Deportivo Toluca | | |
| 1978–1980 | Monterrey | 49 | (1) |
| 1980–1981 | UdeG | 21 | (2) |
| 1981–1982 | Guadalajara | 11 | (0) |

International career
| 1977–1980 | Mexico | 8 | (1) |
- * Club domestic league appearances and goals

Rigoberto Cisneros Dueñas (born 15 August 1953) is a Mexican former football defender who played for Mexico in the 1978 FIFA World Cup.

== Club career ==
Cisneros played club football for Toluca, Monterrey, Club Universidad de Guadalajara and Guadalajara.
