= Khemais Labidi =

Tunisian footballer

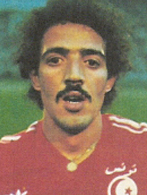
- Laabidi in 1978

Personal information
- Date of birth: 30 August 1950 (age 76)
- Place of birth: Tunisia
- Position: Midfielder

Senior career*
Years	Team	Apps	(Gls)
1970–1980	JS Kairouan		
1980–1981	Al-Wehda		

International career
1976–1980	Tunisia		

Managerial career
- 1992–1995: JS Kairouan
- 1996: JS Kairouan
- 1997–1998: JS Kairouan
- 2004: Tunisian U23
- 2005: JS Kairouan
- 2006: CS Hammam-Lif
- 2013: Najran
- 2017: JS Kairouan
- 2021: San Pédro
- * Club domestic league appearances and goals

Khemais Labidi (born 30 August 1950) is a Tunisian football manager and retired footballer who played as a midfielder during his club career and for the Tunisia national team.

He was most recently the manager of Ivorian club San Pédro. He represented the Tunisia in the 1978 FIFA World Cup. He also played for Tunisian club Jeunesse Sportive Kairouanaise and Saudi club Al-Wehda. He later also coached the Tunisian Olympic side at the 2004 Summer Olympics.
