= Mokhtar Naili =

Tunisian footballer

- Naili with Club Africain

Personal information
- Date of birth: 3 September 1953 (age 73)
- Place of birth: Tunis, Tunisia
- Height: 1.77 m (5 ft 10 in)
- Position: Goalkeeper

Senior career*
Years	Team	Apps	(Gls)
1969–1983	Club Africain		

International career
1977–1982	Tunisia	30	(0)
- * Club domestic league appearances and goals

Mokhtar Naili (Arabic: مختار النايلي; born 3 September 1953) is a Tunisian former footballer who played as a goalkeeper for Club Africain and the Tunisia national team. He was capped 30 times for Tunisia, and played in all three of Tunisia's matches at the 1978 FIFA World Cup.
