= Slah Karoui =

Tunisian footballer

Personal information
- Date of birth: 11 September 1951 (age 75)
- Place of birth: Tunisia
- Position: Forward

Senior career*
Years	Team	Apps	(Gls)
- Étoile Sportive du Sahel

International career
- Tunisia
- * Club domestic league appearances and goals

Slah Karoui (born 11 September 1951) is a Tunisian football forward who played for the Tunisia national team. He participated in the 1978 FIFA World Cup for the national team. He also played for Étoile Sportive du Sahel.
