= Témime Lahzami =

Tunisian footballer

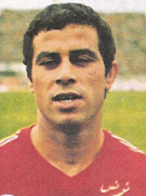
- Lahzami in 1978

Personal information
- Full name: Témime Ben Abdallah
- Date of birth: 1 January 1949 (age 77)
- Place of birth: Hammam-Lif, Tunisia
- Height: 1.71 m (5 ft 7 in)
- Position: Winger

Youth career
- 1962–1967: CS Hammam-Lif

Senior career*
Years	Team	Apps	(Gls)
1967–1970	CS Hammam-Lif	77	(10)
1970–1979	Espérance	204	(79)
1979–1981	Marseille	35	(6)
1981–1982	Al-Ittihad	22	(7)
1982–1984	CS Hammam-Lif	54	(18)
Total		392	(120)

International career^{‡}
1977–1981	Tunisia	69	(12)
- * Club domestic league appearances and goals as of August 31, 2007 ‡ National team caps and goals as of 23 June 2006

Témime Ben Abdallah (born 1 January 1949 in Hammam-Lif), commonly known as Témime Lahzami, is a former Tunisian football winger.

He was the captain of Tunisia's 1978 World Cup campaign. He was capped 69 times for Tunisia.
