= Mohamed Ben Rehaiem =

Tunisian footballer (1951–2020)

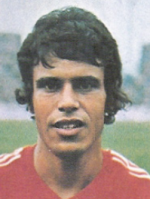
- Mohamed Ben Rehaiem in 1978

Personal information
- Full name: Mohamed Ben Rehaiem
- Date of birth: 20 March 1951
- Place of birth: Sfax, Tunisia
- Date of death: 21 August 2020 (aged 69)
- Place of death: Sfax, Tunisia
- Height: 1.73 m (5 ft 8 in)
- Position: Midfielder

Youth career
- 1959–1970: Sfaxien

Senior career*
Years	Team	Apps	(Gls)
1970–1986	Sfaxien		
1979–1980	Al-Nassr		
1980–1981	Al Ain		
1981–1986	Sfaxien	+17	(+8)
Total		+17	(+8)

International career
1972–1980	Tunisia	35	(4)
- * Club domestic league appearances and goals

Mohamed Ben Rehaiem (Arabic: محمد بن رحيّم), also known as Hamadi Agrebi (Arabic: حمادي العقربي) (20 March 1951 – 21 August 2020), was a Tunisian football midfielder who played for the Tunisia national team. He was part of the Tunisian squad that participated in the 1978 FIFA World Cup. He also played for CS Sfaxien. He also played for Al Ain and Al-Nassr. On 1 October 2020, the Stade Olympique de Rades (now known as Stade Olympique Hammadi-Agrebi) in Radès bears his name.
