= Amor Jebali =

Tunisian footballer

Personal information
- Date of birth: 24 December 1956 (age 69)
- Place of birth: La Marsa, Tunisia
- Position: Defender

Senior career*
| Years | Team | Apps | (Gls) |
| 1975-1987 | Avenir Sportif de La Marsa | 241 | (33) |

International career
| 1976-1982 | Tunisia | 52 | (2) |
- * Club domestic league appearances and goals

Amor Jebali (born 24 December 1956) is a Tunisian football defender who played for Avenir Sportif de La Marsa and the Tunisia national team. He was also part of the Tunisian squad that participated in the 1978 FIFA World Cup.
