= Néjib Ghommidh =

Tunisian footballer

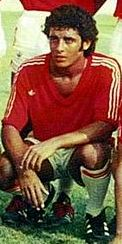

Personal information
- Full name: Néjib Ghommidh
- Date of birth: March 12, 1953 (age 73)
- Place of birth: Tunisia
- Position: Midfielder

Senior career*
Years	Team	Apps	(Gls)
1972-1978	Club Africain		
1978-1979	Al-Ittihad		
1979-1982	Club Africain		

International career
1976-1980	Tunisia	52	(2)
- * Club domestic league appearances and goals

Néjib Ghommidh (Arabic: نَجِيب غُمَّيْض; born 12 March 1953 in Tunis) is a retired Tunisian footballer.

He played for the Tunisia national football team, including appearing for them in the 1978 FIFA World Cup. In Tunisia's first ever World Cup finals match, he scored the second goal in a 3–1 win over Mexico. He played as a defensive midfielder.
