= Jalel Kadri =

Tunisian football manager (born 1971)

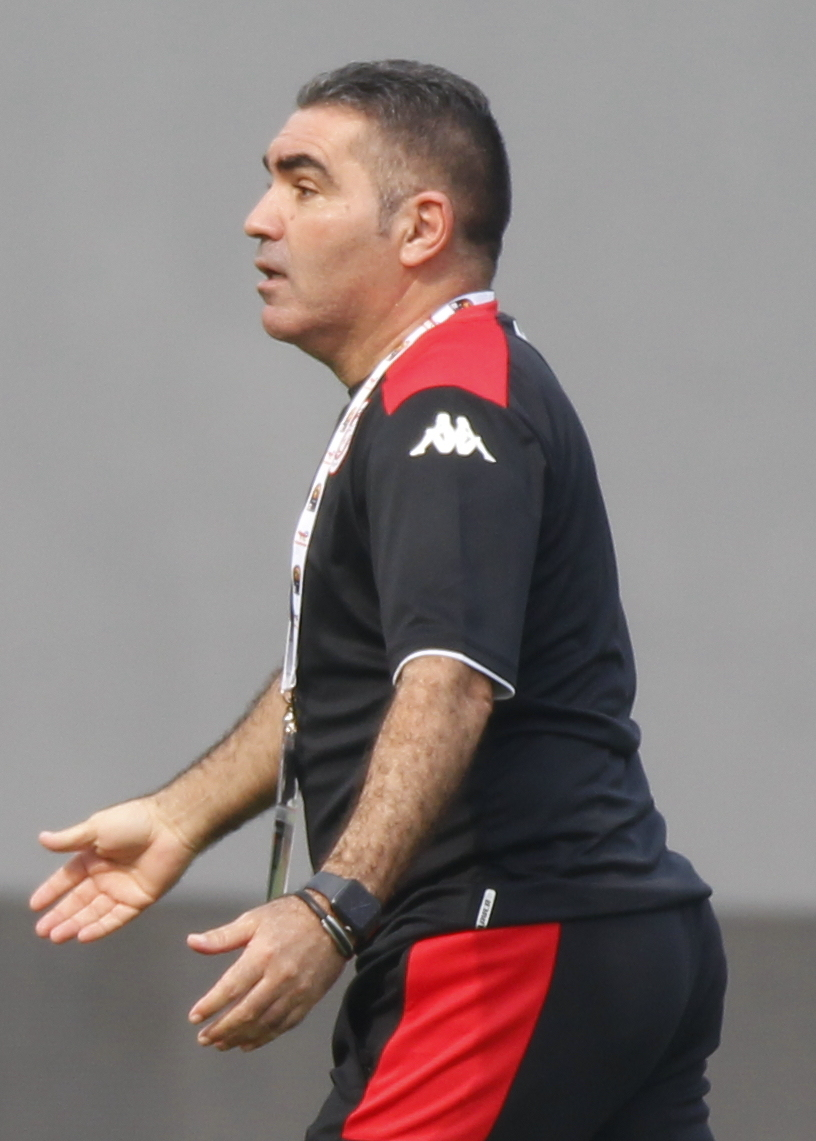
- Kadri with Tunisia during 2021 Africa Cup of Nations

Personal information
- Date of birth: 14 December 1971 (age 54)
- Place of birth: Tozeur, Tunisia

Team information
- Current team: Al-Hazem (head coach)

Managerial career
- Years: Team
- 2001–2002: AS Djerba
- 2003–2004: EGS Gafsa
- 2004–2005: El Makarem de Mahdia
- 2005–2006: AS Kasserine
- 2006: AS Gabès
- 2006–2007: Jendouba
- 2007–2008: Tunisia U-20
- 2009: Espérance Sportive de Zarzis
- 2010: EGS Gafsa
- 2010–2011: US Monastir
- 2011: Damac FC
- 2011–2012: Al-Ansar
- 2012: Étoile Sportive de Béni Khalled
- 2012–2013: Al-Nahda
- 2013: Tunisia (assistant)
- 2013–2014: Al-Nahda
- 2014–2016: Al-Khaleej
- 2016–2017: Al-Khaleej
- 2017–2018: JS Kairouan
- 2018: CA Bizertin
- 2018–2019: Emirates Club
- 2019–2020: Stade Tunisien
- 2020–2021: Al Ahli
- 2021: Al-Adalah
- 2021–2022: Tunisia (assistant)
- 2022–2024: Tunisia
- 2025–: Al-Hazem

Jalel Kadri (Arabic: جلال القادري; born on 14 December 1971) is a Tunisian football coach who is the currently head coach of Saudi Pro League club Al-Hazem.

== Coaching career ==
On 7 October 2013 Kadri was appointed as manager of Saudi club Al-Nahda.

On 30 April 2014, Kadri was appointed as manager of newly promoted Saudi Pro League club Al-Khaleej. He left the club at the end of his contract following the conclusion of the 2015–16 season. He returned to the club on 30 August 2016 following the sacking of Patrick De Wilde.

On 31 January 2021, Kadri was appointed as manager of Saudi club Al-Adalah.

In June 2021, Kadri became assistant coach of the Tunisia national team for the second time. This time under Mondher Kebaier, with whom he accompanied the team to the 2021 Africa Cup of Nations, where he became head coach in the round of 16 after Kebaier contracted COVID-19.

On 23 January 2022, during the match against Nigeria in the round of 16 of the 2021 African Cup of Nations, Kadri replaced the first coach, Mondher Kebaier, at the helm of the team due to his COVID-19 infection, the match ending with a victory for Tunisia 1–0. On 30 January he was appointed temporary coach after being eliminated from the quarter-finals of the Africon against Burkina Faso. In the process, he led the team to qualify for the 2022 FIFA World Cup, allowing him to become a permanent coach of the senior side. In the 2022 FIFA World Cup, Kadri's Tunisia once again failed to live up to expectation as Tunisia failed to advance past the group stage due to the 1–0 defeat to Australia in the World Cup group D, despite Tunisia's 1–0 win over defending champions France in the final match. After the cup, Kadri was allowed to remain in charge of Tunisia until 2024.

On 24 January 2024, Kadri resigned from his position after the 2023 Africa Cup of Nations group stage exit.

On 14 April 2025, Kadri was appointed as manager of Saudi club Al-Hazem.

== Personal life ==
Kadri was born in Tozeur, Tunisia. He graduated from the Higher Institute of Sport and Physical Education of Ksar Saïd (ISSEP) in Tunis. He is married to Ines Mhirsi Kadri since 2011 and currently lives in Saudi Arabia.
