= Mokhtar Dhouieb =

Tunisian footballer

Personal information
- Full name: Mokhtar Dhouieb
- Date of birth: March 23, 1952 (age 74)
- Place of birth: Tunisia

Senior career*
| Years | Team | Apps | (Gls) |
| 1972-1979 | CS Sfaxien | | |
| 1979–1980 | Al-Nassr | | |
| 1980-1982 | CS Sfaxien | | |

International career
| 1973–1980 | Tunisia | 52 | (1) |
- * Club domestic league appearances and goals

Mokhtar Dhouib (born 23 March 1952) is a retired Tunisian footballer who played for the Tunisia national team.

He was a member of the Tunisia squad at the 1978 FIFA World Cup. In Tunisia's first ever World Cup match, he scored the third goal in a 3–1 win over Mexico.
