= Ali Kaabi =

Tunisian footballer

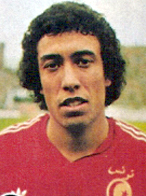
- Kaabi in 1978

Personal information
- Full name: Ali Kaabi
- Date of birth: November 15, 1953 (age 72)
- Place of birth: Tunisia
- Position: Defender

Senior career*
Years	Team	Apps	(Gls)
1970–1987	Al Hilal SFC	250	(38)

International career
1973–1982	Tunisia	77	(9)
- * Club domestic league appearances and goals

Ali Kaabi (born 15 November 1953) is a retired Tunisian footballer.

Kaabi made 72 appearances and scored nine goals for the Tunisia national football team from 1973 to 1982, including participating in the 1978 FIFA World Cup. In their first ever World Cup finals match, which Tunisia won 3–1 against Mexico, Kaabi became Tunisia's first-ever World Cup goalscorer. He played as a defender.
