= Guinea national football team results (1958–1999) =

Those are the Guinea national football team all time results:

== Results ==
Date	Venue	Opponents	Score	Competition	Guinea scorers	Att.	Ref.
6 December 1958	Ghana	Ghana	1–6	Friendly	M. Bangoura 1'		
2 October 1960	Liberia	Liberia	5–0	Friendly	T. Camara, D. Dioubaté (2), Kandia, S. Sylla		
23 December 1960	Guinea	Ivory Coast	4–0	Friendly	S. Sylla, B. Sakho, D. Dioubaté		
7 May 1961	Guinea	Mali	2–3	Friendly	D. Dioubaté 2', Kandia		
10 December 1961	Mali	Mali	0–3	Friendly			
17 December 1961	Liberia	Liberia	0–1	Kwame Nkrumah Gold Cup qualification			
29 December 1961	Guinea	Liberia	5–2	Kwame Nkrumah Gold Cup qualification	Kandia (3), T. Camara (2)		
1 April 1962	Guinea	Mali	1–3	Kwame Nkrumah Gold Cup qualification	Kandia		
15 April 1962	Guinea	Mali	2–2	Kwame Nkrumah Gold Cup qualification	D. Diobaté 2', Kandia 46'		
6 May 1962	Togo	Togo	2–1	Friendly	T. Camara (2)		
3 June 1962	Guinea	Togo	0–1	Friendly			
16 December 1962	Stade du 28 Septembre, Conakry (H)	East Germany	2–3	Friendly	Kandia 75', 84'	7,000	
12 January 1963	Sierra Leone	Sierra Leone	3–1	Friendly			
27 January 1963	Guinea	Sierra Leone	4–2	Friendly	D. Dioubaté (4)		
2 February 1963	Ivory Coast	Mali	3–1	Friendly			
3 February 1963	Ivory Coast	Ivory Coast	1–3	Friendly			
10 March 1963	Guinea	Ghana	2–2	Friendly			
27 July 1963	Onikan Stadium, Lagos (A)	Nigeria	2–2	1963 African Cup of Nations qualification	D. Camara 3', 41'	12,000	
1 August 1963	Dahomey	Dahomey	2–1	Friendly			
2 October 1963	Guinea	Ivory Coast	2–0	Friendly	Kandia 17', 30'		
6 October 1963	Stade du 28 Septembre, Conakry (H)	Nigeria	1–0	1963 African Cup of Nations qualification	Kandia 38'	10,000	
15 December 1963	Senegal	Senegal	1–1	Friendly	D. Diobaté 66'		
3 October 1964	Dahomey	Dahomey	5–2	Friendly	Kandia		
25 December 1964	Ivory Coast	Ivory Coast	1–1	1965 All-Africa Games qualification	Kandia		
31 December 1964	Ivory Coast	Ghana	3–3	1965 All-Africa Games qualification			
1 January 1965	Ivory Coast	Liberia	3–3	1965 All-Africa Games qualification			
24 February 1965	Stade Demba Diop, Dakar (A)	Senegal	0–2	1965 African Cup of Nations qualification			
31 March 1965	Stade du 28 Septembre, Conakry (H)	Senegal	3–0	1965 African Cup of Nations qualification	Kandia, Souleymane, ?		
18 April 1965	Guinea	Liberia	7–0	Friendly	Kandia (2)		
25 April 1965	Mali	Mali	1–1	1965 African Cup of Nations qualification			
6 June 1965	Guinea	Mali	2–1	1965 African Cup of Nations qualification			
20 June 1965	Congo	Congo	2–1	Friendly			
25 July 1965	China	China	1–1	Friendly			
1 August 1965	Kim Il Sung Stadium, Pyongyang (N)	Cambodia	2–1	GANEFO qualification			
3 August 1965	Kim Il Sung Stadium, Pyongyang (N)	Indonesia	3–1	GANEFO qualification			
6 August 1965	Kim Il Sung Stadium, Pyongyang (N)	North Vietnam	1–2	GANEFO qualification			
7 August 1965	Kim Il Sung Stadium, Pyongyang (N)	North Korea	0–3	GANEFO qualification			
10 August 1965	Kim Il Sung Stadium, Pyongyang (N)	China	0–2	GANEFO qualification			
3 October 1965	Guinea	Congo	1–2	Friendly			
6 March 1966	Guinea	Senegal	5–0	Friendly	Kandia		
25 March 1966	Guinea	China	2–2	Friendly			
30 March 1966	Guinea	China	3–1	Friendly			
28 September 1966	Guinea	Cameroon	2–2	Guinea Independence Tournament			
2 October 1966	Guinea	Mali	5–0	Guinea Independence Tournament			
1 November 1966	Mali	Mali	0–1	Friendly			
19 February 1967	Stade du 28 Septembre, Conakry (H)	Senegal	3–0	1968 African Cup of Nations qualification	Kandia		
19 March 1967	Stade Demba Diop, Dakar (A)	Senegal	1–4	1968 African Cup of Nations qualification	Kandia		
10 May 1967	Stade du 28 Septembre, Conakry (H)	Liberia	3–0	1968 African Cup of Nations qualification	Kandia		
24 May 1967	Antoinette Tubman Stadium, Monrovia (A)	Liberia	2–2	1968 African Cup of Nations qualification			
18 June 1967	Stade Omar Bongo, Libreville (A)	Gabon	0–0	1968 Summer Olympics qualification			
9 July 1967	Stade du 28 Septembre, Conakry (H)	Gabon	6–1	1968 Summer Olympics qualification			
22 November 1967	Stade Demba Diop, Dakar (A)	Senegal	1–2	1968 African Cup of Nations qualification			
2 December 1967	Brookfields National Stadium, Freetown (A)	Sierra Leone	1–2	Friendly			
20 January 1968	Sierra Leone	Sierra Leone	1–1	Friendly			
4 February 1968	Guinea	Sierra Leone	7–1	Friendly			
25 February 1968	Upper Volta	Upper Volta	0–2	Friendly			
7 March 1968	Guinea	DR Congo	1–0	Friendly			
31 March 1968	Stade du 28 Septembre, Conakry (H)	Upper Volta	3–1	Friendly	Kandia		
7 April 1968	Stade Général Eyadema, Lomé (A)	Togo	1–1	Friendly			
10 April 1968	Dahomey	Dahomey	2–4	Friendly	Kandia		
21 April 1968	Guinea	Togo	2–0	Friendly			
26 June 1968	Stade d'Honneur, Casablanca (N)	Algeria	2–2	1968 Summer Olympics qualification	Souleymane 38', Sim 58'		
30 June 1968	Stade d'Honneur, Casablanca (N)	Algeria	3–2	1968 Summer Olympics qualification	Souleymane 7', Ndongo 10' pen., Maxime 55'		
13 October 1968	Estadio Cuauhtémoc, Puebla (N)	France	1–3	1968 Summer Olympics	Maxime 79'		
15 October 1968	Estadio Cuauhtémoc, Puebla (N)	Colombia	3–2	1968 Summer Olympics	Ndongo 26', Bouya 58', 84'		
17 October 1968	Estadio Azteca, Mexico City (N)	Mexico	0–4	1968 Summer Olympics			
14 December 1968	Brookfields National Stadium, Freetown (A)	Sierra Leone	1–1	Friendly			
12 January 1969	Niger	Niger	3–1	Friendly			
2 February 1969	Stade du 28 Septembre, Conakry (H)	Sierra Leone	1–1	Friendly			
4 April 1969	Guinea	Niger	5–0	Friendly	Kandia		
13 April 1969	Stade du 28 Septembre, Conakry (H)	Togo	4–0	1970 African Cup of Nations qualification	Chérif (3)		
4 May 1969	Stade Général Eyadema, Lomé (A)	Togo	1–1	1970 African Cup of Nations qualification	Kandia		
18 May 1969	Guinea	Gambia	6–2	Friendly			
12 October 1969	Stade du 28 Septembre, Conakry (H)	Senegal	4–3	1970 African Cup of Nations qualification	Kandia (2)		
26 October 1969	Stade Demba Diop, Dakar (A)	Senegal	1–1	1970 African Cup of Nations qualification	Thiam 9'		
12 November 1969	Stade du 28 Septembre, Conakry (H)	Congo	1–1	Friendly			
7 February 1970	Wad Madani Stadium, Wad Madani (N)	United Arab Republic	1–4	1970 African Cup of Nations	Edenté 25' pen.		
9 February 1970	Wad Madani Stadium, Wad Madani (N)	DR Congo	2–2	1970 African Cup of Nations	Petit Sory 5', Edenté 55' pen.		
11 February 1970	Wad Madani Stadium, Wad Madani (N)	Ghana	1–1	1970 African Cup of Nations	Tolo 10'		
15 March 1970	Stade du 28 Septembre, Conakry (H)	Ivory Coast	3-1	Friendly			
19 March 1970	Stade du 28 Septembre, Conakry (H)	Mali	2–1	Friendly			
27 May 1970	Mali	Mali	0–1	1970 Tournoi de la Zone II			
26 July 1970	Felix Houphouet Boigny Stadium, Abidjan (A)	Ivory Coast	2–3	Friendly			
1 November 1970	Brookfields National Stadium, Freetown (A)	Sierra Leone	2–1	Friendly			
15 November 1970	Stade du 28 Septembre, Conakry (H)	Senegal	1–0	1972 African Cup of Nations qualification			
29 November 1970	Senegal	Senegal	0–0	1972 African Cup of Nations qualification			
7 February 1971	Stade Général Eyadema, Lomé (A)	Togo	1–1	1972 Summer Olympics qualification	Maxime		
28 February 1971	Stade du 28 Septembre, Conakry (H)	Togo	0–0 (3–5 p)	1972 Summer Olympics qualification			
2 May 1971	Independence Stadium, Bakau (A)	Gambia	4–2	Friendly			
13 June 1971	Stade du 28 Septembre, Conakry (H)	Mali	0–0	1972 African Cup of Nations qualification			
27 June 1971	Bamako (A)	Mali	1–3	1972 African Cup of Nations qualification	N'Jo Lea		
8 July 1971	Tanzania	Tanzania	2–1	Friendly			
11 July 1971	Tanzania	Tanzania	4–1	Friendly			
14 July 1971	Tanzania	Tanzania	2–3	Friendly			
18 July 1971	Zambia	Zambia	2–4	Friendly			
21 July 1971	Zambia	Zambia	5–1	Friendly			
25 July 1971	Zambia	Zambia	1–2	Friendly			
14 November 1971	Stade du 28 Septembre, Conakry (H)	Tanzania	3–2	Friendly			
21 November 1971	Stade du 28 Septembre, Conakry (H)	Tanzania	4–2	Friendly			
1 December 1971	Stade du 28 Septembre, Conakry (H)	Nigeria	3–0	Friendly			
12 January 1972	Stade du 28 Septembre, Conakry (H)	Congo	0–1	Friendly			
30 January 1972	Nigeria	Nigeria	1–1	Friendly			
6 February 1972	Congo	Congo	2–2	Friendly			
2 March 1972	Stade 5 Juillet 1962, Algiers (A)	Algeria	0–1	1974 FIFA World Cup qualification			
12 March 1972	Stade du 28 Septembre, Conakry (H)	Algeria	5–1	1974 FIFA World Cup qualification	Maxime 28', Petit Sory 36', Edenté 54' pen., Chérif 78', Smith 82'		
31 May 1972	Liberia	Liberia	2–0	Friendly			
28 September 1972	Senegal	Gambia	8–0	1973 Tournoi de la Zone II	N'Jo Lea (3)		
1 October 1972	Senegal	Senegal	3–2	1973 Tournoi de la Zone II	N'Jo Lea (2)		
3 October 1972	Senegal	Mauritania	14–0	1973 Tournoi de la Zone II	N'Jo Lea (9)		
8 October 1972	Senegal	Mali	4–3	1973 Tournoi de la Zone II	N'Jo Lea (2)		
24 November 1972	Stade du 28 Septembre, Conakry (H)	China	1–1	Friendly			
8 January 1973	Liberty Stadium, Ibadan (N)	Egypt	4–1	1973 All-Africa Games			
10 January 1973	Liberty Stadium, Ibadan (N)	Upper Volta	3–2	1973 All-Africa Games			
12 January 1973	Liberty Stadium, Ibadan (N)	Congo	1–5	1973 All-Africa Games			
14 January 1973	Surulere Stadium, Lagos (N)	Ghana	2–1	1973 All-Africa Games			
18 January 1973	Surulere Stadium, Lagos (N)	Nigeria	1–2	1973 All-Africa Games			
11 February 1973	Stade du 28 Septembre, Conakry (H)	Morocco	1–1	1974 FIFA World Cup qualification	Chérif 14'		
25 February 1973	Saniat Rmel Stadium, Tetouan (A)	Morocco	0–2	1974 FIFA World Cup qualification			
1 April 1973	Guinea	Upper Volta	2–1	Friendly			
4 April 1973	Guinea	Upper Volta	5–0	Friendly			
8 April 1973	Benin	Benin	3–1	Friendly			
11 April 1973	Benin	Benin	1–1	Friendly			
3 June 1973	Gambia	Gambia	3–2	Friendly			
25 July 1973	Bamako (A)	Mali	2–2	1974 African Cup of Nations qualification			
3 August 1973	Beijing (A)	China	2–5	Friendly			
16 September 1973	Stade du 28 Septembre, Conakry (H)	Mali	1–1 (4–3 p)	1972 African Cup of Nations qualification			
30 December 1973	Stade du 28 Septembre, Conakry (H)	Tunisia	0–0	Friendly			
15 February 1974	Ghana	Ghana	2–5	Friendly			
17 February 1974	Ghana	Ghana	1–3	Friendly			
3 March 1974	Damanhur (N)	Zaire	1–2	1974 African Cup of Nations	B. Sylla 25'		
5 March 1974	Damanhur (N)	Mauritius	2–1	1974 African Cup of Nations	Morciré (2)		
7 March 1974	Alexandria Stadium, Alexandria (N)	Congo	1–1	1974 African Cup of Nations	Edenté 60' pen.		
17 May 1974	Guinea	Cuba	1–2	Friendly			
14 July 1974	Guinea	Ghana	1–1	Friendly	C. Souleymane 10'		
15 December 1974	Ghana	Ghana	1–1	Friendly	O. Bangoura 35'		
22 December 1974	Ghana	Ghana	2–1	Friendly			
24 December 1974	Togo	Togo	2–1	Friendly		3,000	
29 December 1974	Cameroon	Cameroon	1–1	Friendly			
1 January 1975	Cameroon	Cameroon	0–1	Friendly			
19 January 1975	Mali	Mali	2–0	Friendly			
26 January 1975	Guinea	Cameroon	3–0	Friendly			
22 February 1975	Liberia	Liberia	1–1	Friendly			
30 March 1975	Niger	Niger	4–2	1976 African Cup of Nations qualification			
13 April 1975	Stade du 28 Septembre, Conakry (H)	Niger	3–0	1976 African Cup of Nations qualification			
27 April 1975	Independence Stadium, Bakau (A)	Gambia	1–0	1976 Summer Olympics qualification			
1 June 1975	Stade du 28 Septembre, Conakry (H)	Gambia	6–0	1976 Summer Olympics qualification			
8 June 1975	Guinea-Bissau	Mali	5–1	1975 Tournoi de la Zone II	D. Diarra 5', 55', O. Bangoura 64', M. Sylla 73, N. Camara 80'		
11 June 1975	Guinea-Bissau	Gambia	2–1	1975 Tournoi de la Zone II			
14 June 1975	Guinea-Bissau	Mali	0–0 (4–2 p)	1975 Tournoi de la Zone II	A. Sylla 15', 20'		
15 June 1975	Guinea-Bissau	Guinea-Bissau	5–2	1975 Tournoi de la Zone II	C. Souleymane 1', 55', B. Sylla 25', A. Sylla 44', O. Bangoura 78'		
3 July 1975	Stade Général Eyadema, Lomé (A)	Togo	2–2	1976 African Cup of Nations qualification	N'Jo Lea (2)		
17 July 1975	Stade du 28 Septembre, Conakry (H)	Togo	2–0	1976 African Cup of Nations qualification			
30 November 1975	Stade du 28 Septembre, Conakry (H)	Ghana	1–0	1976 Summer Olympics qualification			
14 December 1975	Accra Sports Stadium, Accra (A)	Ghana	2–6	1976 Summer Olympics qualification			
16 January 1976	Gambia	Senegal	2–2	1976 Tournoi de la Zone II	A. Sylla 9', 37'		
17 January 1976	Gambia	Mauritania	4–0	1976 Tournoi de la Zone II	Unknown		
18 January 1976	Gambia	Mali	0–1	1976 Tournoi de la Zone II			
1 February 1976	Mali	Mali	1–1	Friendly			
15 February 1976	Guinea	Mali	2–1	Friendly			
29 February 1976	Addis Ababa Stadium, Addis Ababa (N)	Egypt	1–1	1976 African Cup of Nations	Sylla 44' pen.	30,000	
3 March 1976	Addis Ababa Stadium, Addis Ababa (N)	Ethiopia	2–1	1976 African Cup of Nations	N'Jo Lea 15', Petit Sory 85'		
5 March 1976	Addis Ababa Stadium, Addis Ababa (N)	Uganda	2–1	1976 African Cup of Nations	N'Jo Lea 2', B. Sylla 20'		
9 March 1976	Addis Ababa Stadium, Addis Ababa (N)	Nigeria	1–1	1976 African Cup of Nations	Papa Camara 88'	10,000	
11 March 1976	Addis Ababa Stadium, Addis Ababa (N)	Egypt	4–2	1976 African Cup of Nations	N'Jo Lea 24', 65', Sultan 53' o.g., Morciré 62'	10,000	
14 March 1976	Addis Ababa Stadium, Addis Ababa (N)	Morocco	1–1	1976 African Cup of Nations	Chérif 33'		
18 April 1976	Brookfields National Stadium, Freetown (A)	Sierra Leone	1–1	Friendly			
1 May 1976	Stade 5 Juillet 1962, Algiers (A)	Algeria	2–1	Friendly			
10 October 1976	Accra Sports Stadium, Accra (A)	Ghana	1–2	1978 FIFA World Cup qualification	Y. Camara 52'		
31 October 1976	Stade du 28 Septembre, Conakry (H)	Ghana	2–1	1978 FIFA World Cup qualification	P. Camara 51', N'Jo Lea 56'		
16 January 1977	Stade Général Eyadema, Lomé (N)	Ghana	2–0	1978 FIFA World Cup qualification	P. Camara 3', S. Sylla 31'		
13 February 1977	Stade Général Eyadema, Lomé (A)	Togo	2–0	1978 FIFA World Cup qualification	Bangoura 15', Chérif 84'		
27 February 1977	Stade du 28 Septembre, Conakry (H)	Togo	2–1	1978 FIFA World Cup qualification	P. Camara 36', Thiam 40' pen.		
5 March 1977	Senegal	Senegal	0–1	Friendly			
13 March 1977	Stade du 28 Septembre, Conakry (H)	Libya	3–0	1978 African Cup of Nations qualification			
25 March 1977	Libya	Libya	2–0	1978 African Cup of Nations qualification			
5 June 1977	Stade du 28 Septembre, Conakry (H)	Tunisia	1–0	1978 FIFA World Cup qualification	B. Sylla 77'		
19 June 1977	El Menzah Stadium, Tunis (A)	Tunisia	1–3	1978 FIFA World Cup qualification	I. Sylla 11'		
30 October 1977	El Menzah Stadium, Tunis (A)	Tunisia	0–3	1978 African Cup of Nations qualification			
13 November 1977	Stade du 28 Septembre, Conakry (H)	Tunisia	3–2	1978 African Cup of Nations qualification			
29 April 1978	Guinea-Bissau	Cape Verde	1–0				
8 January 1979	Estádio 24 de Setembro, Bissau (N)	Mali	0–1	1979 Amílcar Cabral Cup			
10 January 1979	Estádio 24 de Setembro, Bissau (N)	Mauritania	4–1	1979 Amílcar Cabral Cup			
12 January 1979	Estádio 24 de Setembro, Bissau (N)	Gambia	1–1	1979 Amílcar Cabral Cup			
13 January 1979	Estádio 24 de Setembro, Bissau (N)	Senegal	1–3	1979 Amílcar Cabral Cup			
14 January 1979	Estádio 24 de Setembro, Bissau (N)	Guinea-Bissau	2–2 (5–4 p)	1979 Amílcar Cabral Cup			
28 January 1979	Antoinette Tubman Stadium, Monrovia (A)	Liberia	1–2	Friendly			
30 January 1979	Antoinette Tubman Stadium, Monrovia (N)	Senegal	1–1	Friendly			
18 March 1979	Stade du 28 Septembre, Conakry (H)	Cameroon	3–0	1980 African Cup of Nations qualification			
1 April 1979	Stade Ahmadou Ahidjo, Yaoundé (A)	Cameroon	0–3 (6–5 p)	1980 African Cup of Nations qualification			
4 August 1979	Kinshasa	Zaire	2–3	1980 African Cup of Nations qualification			
19 August 1979	Stade du 28 Septembre, Conakry (H)	Zaire	3–1	1980 African Cup of Nations qualification			
11 February 1980	[GMB]	Guinea-Bissau	2–1	1980 Amílcar Cabral Cup	B.Sylla 26', S.Traoré 77'	—	
13 February 1980	[GMB]	Gambia	0–0	1980 Amílcar Cabral Cup		—	
16 February 1980	[GMB]	Senegal	1–2	1980 Amílcar Cabral Cup	Unknown	—	
4 March 1980	[SLE]	Sierra Leone	2–3	Friendly	Unknown	—	
9 March 1980	Liberty Stadium, Ibadan (N)	Morocco	1–1	1980 African Cup of Nations	Moussa Camara 8'	40,000	
13 March 1980	Liberty Stadium, Ibadan (N)	Ghana	0–1	1980 African Cup of Nations		20,000	
16 March 1980	Liberty Stadium, Ibadan (N)	Algeria	2–3	1980 African Cup of Nations	Diawara 82', S. Bangoura 90+1'	20,000	
1 May 1980	[SEN]	Senegal	0–1	Friendly		—	
22 June 1980	[GUI]	Lesotho	3–1	1982 FIFA World Cup qualification	M.Koné 39', N.Camara 52' pen., A.Touré 82'	16000	
28 June 1980	[COD]	Congo	1–1	1980 Zaire Tournament	Unknown	—	
6 July 1980	[LES]	Lesotho	1–1	1982 FIFA World Cup qualification	A. Touré 33'	4325	
23 November 1980	[GUI]	Zaire	2–1	Friendly	Unknown	—	
7 December 1980	[LBR]	Liberia	0–0	1982 FIFA World Cup qualification		15000	
21 December 1980	[GUI]	Liberia	1–0	1982 FIFA World Cup qualification	S.Bangoura 39'	15524	
2 February 1981	[MLI]	Gambia	1–1	1981 Amílcar Cabral Cup	Unknown	—	
4 February 1981	[MLI]	Mali	1–1	1981 Amílcar Cabral Cup	Unknown	—	
6 February 1981	[MLI]	Mauritania	2–1	1981 Amílcar Cabral Cup	Unknown	—	
10 February 1981	[MLI]	Senegal	1–0	1981 Amílcar Cabral Cup	Unknown	—	
13 February 1981	[MLI]	Mali	0–0 (6–5 p)	1981 Amílcar Cabral Cup		60000	
25 March 1981	[SEN]	Senegal	1–0	Friendly	Unknown	—	
12 April 1981	[GUI]	Nigeria	1–1	1982 FIFA World Cup qualification	I.Touré 66' pen.	50000	
25 April 1981	[NGA]	Nigeria	0–1	1982 FIFA World Cup qualification		60000	
6 May 1981	[LBR]	Liberia	1–2	Friendly	Unknown	—	
28 June 1981	[GUI]	Ethiopia	2–2	1982 African Cup of Nations qualification	I.Touré 22' pen, 68' pen.	30000	
22 August 1981	Al-Shaab Stadium, Baghdad (A)	Iraq	0–4	Friendly		—	
24 August 1981	Al-Shaab Stadium, Baghdad (A)	Iraq	2–2	Friendly	Unknown	—	
4 October 1981	[ETH]	Ethiopia	1–1	1982 African Cup of Nations qualification	A. Abdurahouman 80'	30000	
3 February 1982	[LBY]	Libya	0–2	Friendly		—	
5 February 1982	[LBY]	Libya	0–3	Friendly		—	
11 February 1982	[CVI]	Senegal	1–1	1982 Amílcar Cabral Cup	Unknown	—	
13 February 1982	[CVI]	Sierra Leone	1–0	1982 Amílcar Cabral Cup	Unknown	—	
15 February 1982	[CVI]	Guinea-Bissau	0–0	1982 Amílcar Cabral Cup		—	
17 February 1982	[CVI]	Cape Verde	1–0	1982 Amílcar Cabral Cup	Unknown	—	
19 February 1982	[CVI]	Senegal	3–0	1982 Amílcar Cabral Cup	F.Camara 21', S.Bangoura 37', I.Touré 86'	—	
2 May 1982	[CMR]	Cameroon	1–1	1982 Cameroon Tournament	Unknown	—	
5 May 1982	[CMR]	Senegal	1–1	1982 Cameroon Tournament	B.Sylla 80'	40500	
7 May 1982	[CMR]	Ghana	0–0	1982 Cameroon Tournament		—	
1 February 1983	[SEN]	Senegal	0–1	Friendly		—	
13 February 1983	[GUI]	Mali	0–0	1983 CEDEAO Cup qualification		—	
23 February 1983	[CVI]	Ivory Coast	2–3	Friendly	S.Bangoura 70', M.Ndour 78'	—	
27 February 1983	[MLI]	Mali	1–1 (2–4 p)	1983 CEDEAO Cup qualification	Unknown	—	
10 April 1983	[GUI]	Togo	0–1	1984 African Cup of Nations qualification		20000	
24 April 1983	[TGO]	Togo	0–2	1984 African Cup of Nations qualification		15000	
1 May 1983	[GUI]	Guinea-Bissau	3–0	Friendly	Unknown	—	
15 May 1983	[GUI]	Morocco	0–0	1984 Summer Olympics qualification		25000	
29 May 1983	[MAR]	Morocco	0–3	1984 Summer Olympics qualification		30000	
21 July 1983	[MTN]	Gambia	1–4	1983 Amílcar Cabral Cup	S. Sylla 14'	—	
22 July 1983	[MTN]	Guinea-Bissau	1–2	1983 Amílcar Cabral Cup	A. Diaby 14'	—	
24 July 1983	[MTN]	Senegal	1–1	1983 Amílcar Cabral Cup	Unknown	—	
17 January 1984	[GMB]	Gambia	0–1	Friendly		—	
21 January 1984	[SEN]	Senegal	0–1	Friendly		—	
25 January 1984	[CVI]	Ivory Coast	0–3	Friendly		—	
4 February 1984	[GUI]	Ghana	1–2	Friendly	Unknown	—	
8 February 1984	[SLE]	Gambia	2–2	1984 Amílcar Cabral Cup	Unknown	—	
10 February 1984	[SLE]	Cape Verde	1–1	1984 Amílcar Cabral Cup	Unknown	—	
12 February 1984	[SLE]	Sierra Leone	0–0	1984 Amílcar Cabral Cup		—	
26 July 1984	[MTN]	Gambia	1–1	1984 Mauritania Tournament	Unknown	—	
27 July 1984	[MTN]	Mauritania	1–1	1984 Mauritania Tournament	Unknown	—	
29 July 1984	[MTN]	Gambia	1–0	1984 Mauritania Tournament	Unknown	—	
31 July 1984	[MTN]	Mauritania	2–0	1984 Mauritania Tournament	Unknown	—	
2 August 1984	[MTN]	Mauritania	0–0	Friendly		—	
9 December 1984	[CVI]	Ivory Coast	2–2 (5–4 p)	Friendly	Unknown	—	
10 February 1985	[GUI]	Tunisia	1–0	1986 FIFA World Cup qualification	A. Diaby 20'	30000	
12 February 1985	[GMB]	Senegal	0–2	1985 Amílcar Cabral Cup		—	
14 February 1985	[GMB]	Mali	1–3	1985 Amílcar Cabral Cup	Unknown	—	
16 February 1985	[GMB]	Mauritania	1–0	1985 Amílcar Cabral Cup	Unknown	—	
24 February 1985	[TUN]	Tunisia	0–2	1986 FIFA World Cup qualification		12000	
31 March 1985	[GHA]	Ghana	1–1	1986 African Cup of Nations qualification	F. Camara 77'	—	
14 April 1985	[GUI]	Ghana	1–4	1986 African Cup of Nations qualification	Unknown	—	
24 June 1985	[GUI]	Gambia	1–0	Friendly	Unknown	—	
11 August 1985	[GUI]	Mali	1–1	1985 CEDEAO Cup qualification	Unknown	—	
25 August 1985	[MLI]	Mali	1–1 (4–2 p)	1985 CEDEAO Cup qualification	Unknown	—	
15 December 1985	[GMB]	Gambia	0–0	Friendly		—	
25 December 1985	[SEN]	Senegal	1–3	1985 CEDEAO Cup	Unknown	–	
27 December 1985	[SEN]	Ivory Coast	0–1	1985 CEDEAO Cup		–	
1 February 1986	[SEN]	Senegal	1–2	1986 Amílcar Cabral Cup	Unknown	–	
3 February 1986	[SEN]	Mali	1–1	1986 Amílcar Cabral Cup	Unknown	–	
8 February 1986	[SEN]	Sierra Leone	1–2	1986 Amílcar Cabral Cup	Unknown	–	
26 July 1986	[LBR]	Liberia	0–0	Samuel K. Doe Cup		–	
28 July 1986	[LBR]	Ivory Coast	0–2	Samuel K. Doe Cup		–	
1 August 1986	[LBR]	Liberia	1–2	Samuel K. Doe Cup	Unknown	–	
16 August 1986	[GUI]	Gambia	2–1	1988 African Cup of Nations qualification	Unknown	15000	
30 August 1986	[GMB]	Gambia	1–0	1988 African Cup of Nations qualification	Unknown	20000	
22 February 1987	[GUI]	Mauritania	1–0	1987 Amílcar Cabral Cup	S.Bangoura 58'	35000	
24 February 1987	[GUI]	Mali	0–0	1987 Amílcar Cabral Cup		8000	
26 February 1987	[GUI]	Guinea-Bissau	0–0	1987 Amílcar Cabral Cup		–	
1 March 1987	[GUI]	Senegal	1–0	1987 Amílcar Cabral Cup	Unknown	–	
3 March 1987	[GUI]	Mali	1–0	1987 Amílcar Cabral Cup	Unknown	–	
29 March 1987	[SEN]	Senegal	0–4	1988 African Cup of Nations qualification		60000	
12 April 1987	[GUI]	Senegal	0–0	1988 African Cup of Nations qualification		20000	
29 April 1988	[GNB]	Mauritania	1–1	1988 Amílcar Cabral Cup	S.Touré 78'	–	
1 May 1988	[GNB]	Mali	1–0	1988 Amílcar Cabral Cup	S.Touré 17'	–	
3 May 1988	[GNB]	Cape Verde	1–1	1988 Amílcar Cabral Cup	Unknown	–	
5 May 1988	[GNB]	Sierra Leone	3–0	1988 Amílcar Cabral Cup	Unknown	–	
8 May 1988	[GNB]	Mali	0–0 (4–2 p)	1988 Amílcar Cabral Cup		-	
5 August 1988	[TUN]	Tunisia	0–5	1990 FIFA World Cup qualification		15000	
21 August 1988	[GUI]	Tunisia	3–0	1990 FIFA World Cup qualification	A. Emmerson 34', 82' pen., A.Touré 49'	15000	
22 December 1988	[MAR]	Morocco	0–1	Friendly		1000	
30 March 1989	[CVI]	Ivory Coast	0–0	Friendly		–	
9 April 1989	[GUI]	Nigeria	1–1	1990 African Cup of Nations qualification	B.Camara 33'	30000	
22 April 1989	[NGA]	Nigeria	0–3	1990 African Cup of Nations qualification		20000	
28 May 1989	[MLI]	Sierra Leone	1–0	1989 Amílcar Cabral Cup	A. Emmerson 75'	5000	
30 May 1989	[MLI]	Mauritania	3–1	1989 Amílcar Cabral Cup	Unknown	–	
2 June 1989	[MLI]	Cape Verde	1–0	1989 Amílcar Cabral Cup	L.Guillao 66'	25000	
4 June 1989	[MLI]	Mali	0–3	1989 Amílcar Cabral Cup		25000	
5 August 1989	[GNB]	Guinea-Bissau	0–0	Friendly		–	
15 October 1989	[GUI]	Liberia	1–0	Friendly	Unknown	–	
22 October 1989	[LBR]	Liberia	0–2	Friendly		–	
31 October 1989	[KUW]	Iraq	1–0	1989 Peace and Friendship Cup	P. Camara 90'	28000	
3 November 1989	[KUW]	Iran	1–1	1989 Peace and Friendship Cup	A. Emmerson 75'	12000	
5 November 1989	[KUW]	South Yemen	0–1	1989 Peace and Friendship Cup		8500	
26 November 1989	[LBR]	Ghana	1–1	1990 CEDEAO Cup qualification	Unknown	–	
28 November 1989	[LBR]	Liberia	0–2	1990 CEDEAO Cup qualification		–	
19 August 1990	[GUI]	Sierra Leone	1–2	1992 African Cup of Nations qualification	M. Sylla 70'	18000	
2 September 1990	[MLI]	Mali	1–1	1992 African Cup of Nations qualification	F. Yansane 70'	25000	
14 April 1991	[GUI]	Cameroon	0–0	1992 African Cup of Nations qualification		41000	
27 April 1991	[SLE]	Sierra Leone	1–0	1992 African Cup of Nations qualification	S.Touré 33'	20000	
14 July 1991	[GUI]	Mali	2–1	1992 African Cup of Nations qualification	B.Camara 17', A.Camara 70'	38000	
24 July 1991	[CVI]	Ivory Coast	0–0	Friendly		–	
28 July 1991	[CMR]	Cameroon	0–1	1992 African Cup of Nations qualification		40000	
8 September 1991	[MLI]	Mali	0–0	Friendly		–	
24 November 1991	[SEN]	Sierra Leone	0–1	1991 Amílcar Cabral Cup		–	
26 November 1991	[SEN]	Gambia	0–0	1991 Amílcar Cabral Cup		–	
28 November 1991	[SEN]	Mali	0–2	1991 Amílcar Cabral Cup		–	
16 August 1992	[CHD]	Chad	3–0	1994 African Cup of Nations qualification	S.Oularé 10', T. Camara 50', F. Camara 85'	8000	
30 August 1992	[GUI]	Burundi	2–2	1994 African Cup of Nations qualification	T. Camara 43', S.Oularé 44'	10000	
13 December 1992	[GUI]	Sierra Leone	1–1	Friendly	Unknown	–	
20 December 1992	Stade du 28 Septembre, Conakry (H)	Kenya	4–0	1994 FIFA World Cup qualification	F. Camara 51', Oularé 53', T. Camara 65', 89'	13,000	
20 January 1993	[GMB]	Guinea-Bissau	1–2	Friendly	Unknown	–	
27 February 1993	[KEN]	Kenya	0–2	1994 FIFA World Cup qualification		6785	
11 April 1993	[GUI]	Congo	1–0	1994 African Cup of Nations qualification	M. Soumah 84'	16000	
18 April 1993	[CMR]	Cameroon	1–3	1994 FIFA World Cup qualification	M. Sylla 62'	60000	
2 May 1993	Stade du 28 Septembre, Conakry (H)	Zimbabwe	3–0	1994 FIFA World Cup qualification	T. Camara 2', Dramé 16', F. Camara 80'	18,500	
22 June 1993	[FRA]	Algeria	1–1	Friendly	S. Touré 69'	4000	
11 July 1993	[BDI]	Burundi	2–2	1994 African Cup of Nations qualification	T. Camara 58', M. Soumah 70'	20000	
18 July 1993	[GUI]	Cameroon	0–1	1994 FIFA World Cup qualification		15000	
8 August 1993	[GUI]	Sierra Leone	1–0	Friendly	Unknown	–	
9 August 1993	[GUI]	Sierra Leone	4–0	Friendly	Unknown	–	
15 August 1993	[CGO]	Congo	0–0	1994 African Cup of Nations qualification		6000	
26 September 1993	[ZIM]	Zimbabwe	0–1	1994 FIFA World Cup qualification		54955	
24 October 1993	[GAB]	Burundi	0–0 (5–4 p)	1994 FIFA World Cup qualification		15000	
26 November 1993	[SLE]	Sierra Leone	1–1	1993 Amílcar Cabral Cup	Unknown	–	
28 November 1993	[SLE]	Gambia	1–2	1993 Amílcar Cabral Cup	Unknown	–	
30 November 1993	[SLE]	Ghana	0–1	Friendly		–	
18 January 1994	[GUI]	Ivory Coast	3–0	Friendly	Unknown	–	
29 January 1994	[BFA]	Burkina Faso	1–1 (4–5 p)	1994 Black Stars Tournament	A. Sow 51'	20000	
30 January 1994	[BFA]	Niger	1–3	1994 Black Stars Tournament	A. Sow 28'	25000	
27 March 1994	Sousse Olympic Stadium, Sousse (N)	Ghana	0–1	1994 African Cup of Nations		10,000	
29 March 1994	Sousse Olympic Stadium, Sousse (N)	Senegal	1–2	1994 African Cup of Nations	Titi Camara 44'	6,000	
4 September 1994	[BOT]	Botswana	1–0	1996 African Cup of Nations qualification	Titi Camara 89'	15000	
16 October 1994	[GUI]	Angola	3–1	1996 African Cup of Nations qualification	O.Soumah 6', 59', Titi Camara 9'	12000	
30 October 1994	[MLI]	Mali	0–2	1996 African Cup of Nations qualification		30000	
13 November 1994	[MOZ]	Mozambique	1–2	1996 African Cup of Nations qualification	M.Sylla 20'	50000	
29 December 1994	[LBR]	Liberia	0–0	Friendly		–	
1 January 1995	Stade du 28 Septembre, Conakry (H)	Sierra Leone	3–1	Friendly	Unknown	–	
8 January 1995	Stade du 28 Septembre, Conakry (H)	Namibia	3–0	1996 African Cup of Nations qualification	Abdoul Camara 62', A. Sow 69', M. Sylla 88'	–	
9 April 1995	Stade du 28 Septembre, Conakry (H)	Botswana	5–0	1996 African Cup of Nations qualification	Fodé Camara 6', 10', M. Sylla 54', T Diané 60', A. Sow 88'	50,000	
23 April 1995	Estádio da Cidadela, Luanda (A)	Angola	0–3	1996 African Cup of Nations qualification		22,000	
4 June 1995	Stade du 28 Septembre, Conakry (H)	Mozambique	0–0	1996 African Cup of Nations qualification		60,000	
15 July 1995	Independence Stadium, Windhoek (A)	Namibia	0–0	1996 African Cup of Nations qualification		2,000	
30 July 1995	Stade du 28 Septembre, Conakry (H)	Mali	4–1	1996 African Cup of Nations qualification	Titi Camara 28', 45', A. Sow 65' pen., Mo Camara 87'	20,000	
18 November 1995	Olympic Stadium, Nouakchott (N)	Sierra Leone	0–2	1995 Amílcar Cabral Cup		–	
20 November 1995	Olympic Stadium, Nouakchott (N)	Senegal	0–3	1995 Amílcar Cabral Cup		–	
22 November 1995	Olympic Stadium, Nouakchott (N)	Guinea-Bissau	1–2	1995 Amílcar Cabral Cup	Sall 65'	–	
19 May 1996	Independence Stadium, Bakau (A)	Gambia	1–1	Friendly	T. Bangoura 42' pen.	4,000	
1 June 1996	Stade du 28 Septembre, Conakry (H)	Guinea-Bissau	2–3	1998 FIFA World Cup qualification	Titi Camara 53', 54'	15,000	
16 June 1996	Stade du 28 Septembre, Conakry (H)	Guinea-Bissau	3–1	1998 FIFA World Cup qualification	Momo Soumah 33', 59', T. Bangoura 61'	40,000	
22 September 1996	Stade du 28 Septembre, Conakry (H)	Gabon	0–1	Friendly		5,000	
23 September 1996	Stade Modibo Kéïta, Bamako (A)	Mali	0–0	Friendly		–	
6 October 1996	Barthélemy Boganda Stadium, Bangui (A)	Central African Republic	3–2	1998 African Cup of Nations qualification	Momo Soumah 27', 89', N'Jo Lea 85'	15,000	
10 November 1996	Stade du 28 Septembre, Conakry (H)	Kenya	3–1	1998 FIFA World Cup qualification	Titi Camara 17', Fodé Camara 34', Momo Soumah 82'	30,000	
8 January 1997	Stade de la Paix, Bouaké (A)	Ivory Coast	1–2	Friendly	Titi Camara 24'	12,000	
12 January 1997	Stade du 4 Août, Ouagadougou (A)	Burkina Faso	2–0	1998 FIFA World Cup qualification	Oularé 17', Morlaye Soumah 44'	28,000	
26 January 1997	Stade du 28 Septembre, Conakry (H)	Tunisia	1–0	1998 African Cup of Nations qualification	Abdoul Salam Sow 49' pen.	50,000	
23 February 1997	Stade du 28 Septembre, Conakry (H)	Sierra Leone	1–0	1998 African Cup of Nations qualification	Fodé Camara 67'	25,000	
5 April 1997	National Stadium, Lagos (A)	Nigeria	1–2	1998 FIFA World Cup qualification	Titi Camara 87'	40,000	
27 April 1997	Moi International Sports Centre, Nairobi (A)	Kenya	0–1	1998 FIFA World Cup qualification		50,000	
8 June 1997	Stade du 28 Septembre, Conakry (H)	Burkina Faso	3–1	1998 FIFA World Cup qualification	Fodé Camara 9' pen., Balma 27' o.g., Oularé 54'	7,000	
13 July 1997	El Menzah Stadium, Tunis (A)	Tunisia	0–1	1998 African Cup of Nations qualification		25,000	
17 August 1997	Stade du 28 Septembre, Conakry (H)	Nigeria	1–0	1998 FIFA World Cup qualification	Fodé Camara 50'	25,000	
29 November 1997	Independence Stadium, Bakau (N)	Mali	0–0	1997 Amílcar Cabral Cup		–	
1 December 1997	Independence Stadium, Bakau (N)	Sierra Leone	3–0	1997 Amílcar Cabral Cup	Unknown	–	
3 December 1997	Independence Stadium, Bakau (N)	Guinea-Bissau	2–0	1997 Amílcar Cabral Cup	Unknown	–	
5 December 1997	Independence Stadium, Bakau (N)	Senegal	1–2	1997 Amílcar Cabral Cup	Unknown	–	
7 December 1997	Independence Stadium, Bakau (N)	Gambia	2–2 (5–4 p)	1997 Amílcar Cabral Cup	Oularé 5', K.Sylla 34'	–	
4 January 1998	Stade du 28 Septembre, Conakry (H)	Togo	1–0	Friendly	Unknown	–	
31 January 1998	El Menzah Stadium, Tunis (A)	Tunisia	1–4	Friendly	Dioubaté 73'	20000	
8 February 1998	Stade Municipal, Ouagadougou (N)	Algeria	1–0	1998 African Cup of Nations	Oularé 61'	3,000	
11 February 1998	Stade Municipal, Ouagadougou (N)	Cameroon	2–2	1998 African Cup of Nations	Oularé 46', 77'	2,000	
15 February 1998	Stade du 4 Août, Ouagadougou (N)	Burkina Faso	0–1	1998 African Cup of Nations		40,000	
4 October 1998	Stade Municipal, Lomé (A)	Togo	0–2	2000 African Cup of Nations qualification		15,000	
10 January 1999	Stade Léopold Sédar Senghor, Dakar (A)	Senegal	0–1	Friendly		5,000	
13 January 1999	Stade Léopold Sédar Senghor, Dakar (A)	Senegal	0–1	Friendly		4,000	
24 January 1999	Stade du 28 Septembre, Conakry (H)	Morocco	1–1	2000 African Cup of Nations qualification	Oularé 30'	18,000	
6 June 1999	Moulay Abdellah Stadium, Rabat (A)	Morocco	0–1	2000 African Cup of Nations qualification		70,000	
20 June 1999	Stade du 28 Septembre, Conakry (H)	Togo	2–1	2000 African Cup of Nations qualification	Fodé Camara 53', 64'	28,000	

- FIFA.com – Guinea: Fixtures and Results
- Mali and Guinea at Friendlies soccer league – Wednesday 11 August 2010
- "Guinea – Guinea – Results, fixtures, squad, statistics, photos, videos and news". Soccerway. Archived from the original on 8 February 2013.
- World Cup FIFA 1930 – 2014 (all final and preliminary competition)
- SoccerPunter.com – Guinea Past Results and Match Fixtures
- Guinea. National football team
- 1987–2004 matches
