= Cape Verde national football team results (1978–1999) =

This is a list of Cape Verde national football team games from 1978 to 1999.

== Results ==
=== 1978 ===
29 April 1978 1978 Friendship Cup	Guinea	1–0	Cape Verde	Guinea-Bissau
	? ?'	Report

1 May 1978 1978 Friendship Cup	Guinea-Bissau	2–1	Cape Verde	Guinea-Bissau
	? ?'	Report	Branco 2'

1 July 1978 1978 Independence Tournament	Cape Verde	2–0	Guinea-Bissau	Praia, Cape Verde
	Zé di Nhana ?'; Djoi di Mamã ?'	Report		Stadium: Estádio da Várzea

5 July 1978 1978 Independence Tournament	Cape Verde	0–1	Angola	Cape Verde
		Report	Dinis ?'

=== 1979 ===
7 January 1979 1979 Amílcar Cabral Cup GS	Guinea-Bissau	3–0	Cape Verde	Bissau, Guinea-Bissau
	? ?'	Report		Stadium: Estádio Lino Correia

9 January 1979 1979 Amílcar Cabral Cup GS	Senegal	1–0	Cape Verde	Bissau, Guinea-Bissau
	I. Ndiaye ?'	Report		Stadium: Estádio Lino Correia

=== 1980 ===
1 July 1980 1980 Independence Tournament	Cape Verde	1–0	Senegal	Cape Verde
	Pita ?'	Report

=== 1981 ===
3 February 1981 1981 Amílcar Cabral Cup GS	Senegal	1–0	Cape Verde	Bamako, Mali
	N. Ndiaye ?'	Report

7 February 1981 1981 Amílcar Cabral Cup GS	Guinea-Bissau	0–3	Cape Verde	Bamako, Mali
		Report	Balão ?' ? ?'

9 February 1981 1981 Amílcar Cabral Cup SF	Mali	2–0	Cape Verde	Bamako, Mali
	? ?'	Report

12 February 1981 1981 Amílcar Cabral Cup 3rd place	Senegal	5–1	Cape Verde	Bamako, Mali
	T. Mboup ?', ?'; J. Valera ?', ?'; F. Gomis ?'	Report	Balão ?'

=== 1982 ===
11 February 1982 1982 Amílcar Cabral Cup GS	Cape Verde	2–0	Gambia	Praia, Cape Verde
	J. De Júlia ?'; Bala	Report		Stadium: Estádio da Várzea

13 February 1982 1982 Amílcar Cabral Cup GS	Cape Verde	1–0	Mali	Praia, Cape Verde
	Agostinho ?'	Report		Stadium: Estádio da Várzea

15 February 1982 1982 Amílcar Cabral Cup GS	Cape Verde	1–2	Mauritania	Praia, Cape Verde
	? ?'	Report	? ?'	Stadium: Estádio da Várzea

17 February 1982 1982 Amílcar Cabral Cup SF	Cape Verde	0–1	Guinea	Praia, Cape Verde
		Report	? ?'	Stadium: Estádio da Várzea

19 February 1982 1982 Amílcar Cabral Cup 3rd place	Cape Verde	1–2	Mali	Praia, Cape Verde
	Agostinho ?'	Report	? ?'	Stadium: Estádio da Várzea

21 February 1982 Friendly	Cape Verde	0–1	Senegal	Mindelo, Cape Verde
		Report	? ?'	Stadium: Estádio Municipal Adérito Sena
Note: This match is not listed on RSSSF.

=== 1983 ===
20 July 1983 1983 Amílcar Cabral Cup GS	Mauritania	2-0	Cape Verde	Nouakchott, Mauritania
	? ?'	Report		Stadium: Stade Olympique de Nouakchott

22 July 1983 1983 Amílcar Cabral Cup GS	Mali	0–1	Cape Verde	Nouakchott, Mauritania
		Report	? ?'	Stadium: Stade Olympique de Nouakchott

25 July 1983 1983 Amílcar Cabral Cup GS	Sierra Leone	1–0	Cape Verde	Nouakchott, Mauritania
	? ?'	Report		Stadium: Stade Olympique de Nouakchott

=== 1984 ===
8 February 1984 1984 Amílcar Cabral Cup GS	Sierra Leone	2-0	Cape Verde	Freetown, Sierra Leone
	? ?'	Report

10 February 1984 1984 Amílcar Cabral Cup GS	Guinea	1–1	Cape Verde	Freetown, Sierra Leone
	? ?'	Report	? ?'

12 February 1984 1984 Amílcar Cabral Cup GS	Gambia	2–0	Cape Verde	Freetown, Sierra Leone
	? ?'	Report

=== 1985 ===
11 February 1985 1985 Amílcar Cabral Cup GS	Gambia	1–2	Cape Verde	Bakau, Gambia
	P. Gomez ?'	Report	Cabra ?'; Djobla ?'	Stadium: Independence Stadium Bakau

13 February 1985 1985 Amílcar Cabral Cup GS	Sierra Leone	2–2	Cape Verde	Bakau, Gambia
	Kanu 67', 75'	Report	? ?'	Stadium: Independence Stadium Bakau

15 February 1985 1985 Amílcar Cabral Cup GS	Guinea-Bissau	0–2	Cape Verde	Bakau, Gambia
		Report	? ?'	Stadium: Independence Stadium Bakau

19 February 1985 1985 Amílcar Cabral Cup SF	Senegal	1–0	Cape Verde	Bakau, Gambia
	Sèye 9'	Report		Stadium: Independence Stadium Bakau

21 February 1985 1985 Amílcar Cabral Cup 3rd place	Mali	1–0	Cape Verde	Bakau, Gambia
	S. Diarra 24'	Report		Stadium: Independence Stadium Bakau

1 July 1985 1985 Cape Verde Independence Tournament	Cape Verde	2–1 (a.e.t.)	Guinea-Bissau	Praia, Cape Verde
	? ?'	Report	? ?'	Stadium: Estádio da Várzea

4 July 1985 1985 Cape Verde Independence Tournament	Cape Verde	0–0 (1–4 p)	Mozambique	Praia, Cape Verde
		Report		Stadium: Estádio da Várzea

7 July 1985 1985 Cape Verde Independence Tournament	Cape Verde	0–0 (3–4 p)	Angola	Praia, Cape Verde
		Report		Stadium: Estádio da Várzea

=== 1987 ===
25 February 1987 1987 Amílcar Cabral Cup GS	Senegal	2–0 (a.e.t.)	Cape Verde	Conakry, Guinea
	A. Traoré 9'; N. Sarr 36'	Report

27 February 1987 1987 Amílcar Cabral Cup GS	Sierra Leone	2–0	Cape Verde	Conakry, Guinea
	? ?'	Report

2 March 1987 1987 Amílcar Cabral Cup 5th place	Guinea-Bissau	0–0 (5–4 p)	Cape Verde	Conakry, Guinea
		Report

=== 1988 ===
29 April 1988 1988 Amílcar Cabral Cup GS	Mali	3-1	Cape Verde	Bissau, Guinea-Bissau
	? ?'	Report	? ?'

1 May 1988 1988 Amílcar Cabral Cup GS	Mauritania	2–3	Cape Verde	Bissau, Guinea-Bissau
	? ?'	Report	Tony Ravy ?'; Nana ?'; Djack 88'

3 May 1988 1988 Amílcar Cabral Cup GS	Guinea	1–1	Cape Verde	Bissau, Guinea-Bissau
	? ?'	Report	? ?'

=== 1989 ===
25 May 1989 1989 Amílcar Cabral Cup GS	Mali	1–1	Cape Verde	Bamako, Mali
	? ?'	Report	? ?'

27 May 1989 1989 Amílcar Cabral Cup GS	Guinea-Bissau	3–2	Cape Verde	Bamako, Mali
	? ?'	Report	? ?'

30 May 1989 1989 Amílcar Cabral Cup GS	Senegal	1–2	Cape Verde	Bamako, Mali
	B. Samb ?'	Report	Zé da Rocha ?'; Reegue ?'	Stadium: Stade Modibo Kéïta

2 June 1989 1989 Amílcar Cabral Cup SF	Guinea	1–0	Cape Verde	Bamako, Mali
	L. Guillao 66'	Report		Stadium: Stade Modibo Kéïta; Attendance: 25,000

3 June 1989 1989 Amílcar Cabral Cup 3rd place	Sierra Leone	0–1	Cape Verde	Bamako, Mali
		Report	? ?'

=== 1991 ===
22 November 1991 1991 Amílcar Cabral Cup GS	Guinea-Bissau	1–2	Cape Verde	Dakar, Senegal
	? ?'	Report	Zé d'Angola ?', ?'

27 November 1991 1991 Amílcar Cabral Cup GS	Senegal	0–0	Cape Verde	Dakar, Senegal
		Report

30 November 1991 1991 Amílcar Cabral Cup SF	Sierra Leone	0–0 (4–5 p)	Cape Verde	Dakar, Senegal
		Report		Attendance: 10,000
Note: Other sources note the penalty shootout 1-4 to Cape Verde.

2 December 1991 1991 Amílcar Cabral Cup F	Senegal	1–0	Cape Verde	Dakar, Senegal
	Sarr 89' (pen.)	Report		Attendance: 25,000

=== 1992 ===
14 June 1992 1994 Africa Cup of Nations Q	Guinea-Bissau	3–1	Cape Verde	Bissau, Guinea-Bissau
	? ?'	Report	Toy Best ?'	Stadium: Estádio 24 de Setembro; Attendance: 2,000

28 June 1992 1994 Africa Cup of Nations Q	Cape Verde	1–0	Guinea-Bissau	Praia, Cape Verde
	? ?'	Report		Attendance: 1,000

5 July 1992 1994 Africa Cup of Nations Q	Guinea-Bissau	1–0	Cape Verde	Bissau, Guinea-Bissau
	? ?'	Report		Stadium: Estádio 24 de Setembro; Attendance: 10,000

=== 1995 ===
17 November 1995 1995 Amílcar Cabral Cup GS	Cape Verde	1–0	Mali	Nouakchott, Mauritania
	Tambarina 67'	Report		Stadium: Stade Olympique; Referee: Amadou Francois Gueye (Senegal)

19 November 1995 1995 Amílcar Cabral Cup GS	Cape Verde	1–1	Mauritania	Nouakchott, Mauritania
	Lemos 72'	Report	Ould Malha 11'	Stadium: Stade Olympique

21 November 1995 1995 Amílcar Cabral Cup GS	Gambia	3–0	Cape Verde	Nouakchott, Mauritania
	Jammeh 36'; S. Kargbo 56'; Sh. Ceesay 64'	Report		Stadium: Stade Olympique

25 November 1995 1995 Amílcar Cabral Cup SF	Sierra Leone	2–0	Cape Verde	Nouakchott, Mauritania
	Karim 67'; Kanu 75'	Report		Stadium: Stade Olympique; Attendance: 9,000

27 November 1995 1995 Amílcar Cabral Cup 3rd place	Guinea-Bissau	0–1	Cape Verde	Nouakchott, Mauritania
		Report	Tchaulass 64'	Stadium: Stade Olympique; Attendance: 7,000; Referee: Mamadi Cisse (Mali)

=== 1997 ===
28 November 1997 1997 Amílcar Cabral Cup GS	Gambia	3-1	Cape Verde	Bakau, Gambia
	? ?'	Report	? ?'	Stadium: Independence Stadium Bakau

30 November 1997 1997 Amílcar Cabral Cup GS	Senegal	2–0	Cape Verde	Bakau, Gambia
	Samba 20'; A. Diallo 32' (pen.)	Report		Stadium: Independence Stadium Bakau

2 December 1997 1997 Amílcar Cabral Cup GS	Mauritania	2–2	Cape Verde	Bakau, Gambia
	? ?'	Report	Pu ?'; Didinho ?'	Stadium: Independence Stadium Bakau

=== 1998 ===
22 July 1998 Friendly	Senegal	1–0	Cape Verde	Dakar, Senegal
	A. Mbaye 74'	Report		Stadium: Stade Léopold Sédar Senghor

1 August 1998 2000 Africa Cup of Nations Q	Mali	3–0	Cape Verde	Bamako, Mali
	Y. Dissa 23'; H. Diarra 40'; B. Traoré 69'	Report		Stadium: Stade Modibo Kéïta; Attendance: 15,000; Referee: Idrissa Seck (Senegal)

15 August 1998 2000 Africa Cup of Nations Q	Cape Verde	0–0	Mali	Praia, Cape Verde
		Report		Stadium: Estádio da Várzea; Attendance: 6,000

== Record by opponent ==
Team	Pld	W	D	L	GF	GA	GD	WPCT
Angola	2	0	1	1	0	1	−1	0.00
Gambia	5	2	0	3	5	9	−4	40.00
Guinea	5	0	2	3	2	3	−1	0.00
Guinea-Bissau	13	7	1	5	17	14	+3	53.85
Mali	10	3	2	5	6	12	−6	30.00
Mauritania	5	1	2	2	7	9	−2	20.00
Mozambique	1	0	1	0	0	0	0	0.00
Senegal	12	2	1	9	4	16	−12	16.67
Sierra Leone	7	1	2	4	3	9	−6	14.29
Total	60	16	12	32	44	73	−29	26.67

Source: Results
