= Cape Verde national football team results =

Cape Verde national football team results may refer to:

- Cape Verde national football team results (1978–1999)
- Cape Verde national football team results (2000–2019)
- Cape Verde national football team results (2020–present)
