= Cape Verde national football team results (2020–present) =

This article provides details of international football games played by the Cape Verde national football team from 2020 to present.

== Results ==
Key
Win
Draw
Defeat

=== 2020 ===
7 October 2020 Friendly	Andorra	1–2	Cape Verde	Andorra la Vella, Andorra
20:45 UTC+2	Ponck 17' (o.g.)	Report	R. Mendes 8', 54'	Stadium: Estadi Nacional; Attendance: 0 Referee: José Luis Munuera Montero (Spain)

10 October 2020 Friendly	Cape Verde	1–2	Guinea	Faro/Loulé, Portugal
15:00 UTC+1	L. Semedo 39'	Report	Kaba 46'; Bangoura 66'	Stadium: Estádio Algarve

12 November 2020 2021 AFCON qualification	Cape Verde	0–0	Rwanda	Praia, Cape Verde
15:00 UTC−1		Report		Stadium: Estádio Nacional de Cabo Verde; Referee: Daniel Nii Laryea (Ghana)

17 November 2020 2021 AFCON qualification	Rwanda	0–0	Cape Verde	Kigali, Rwanda
15:00 UTC+2		Report		Stadium: Stade Régional Nyamirambo; Referee: Andofetra Rakotojaona (Madagascar)

=== 2021 ===
26 March 2021 2021 AFCON qualification	Cape Verde	3–1	Cameroon	Praia, Cape Verde
15:00 UTC−1	Kuca 25'; Bagnack 59' (o.g.); R. Mendes 69'	Report	Kunde 14'	Stadium: Estádio Nacional de Cabo Verde; Referee: Lahlou Benbraham (Algeria)

30 March 2021 2021 AFCON qualification	Mozambique	0–1	Cape Verde	Maputo, Mozambique
21:00 UTC+2		Report	Bangal 58' (o.g.)	Stadium: Estádio do Zimpeto; Referee: Messie Nkounkou (Congo)

5 June 2021 Unofficial friendly	Brazil U23	1–2	Cape Verde	Belgrade, Serbia
21:00 UTC+2	Pedro 38' (pen.)	Report	L. Semedo 45'; W. Semedo 83'	Stadium: Partizan Stadium; Attendance: 0 Referee: Novak Simović (Serbia)

8 June 2021 Friendly	Senegal	2–0	Cape Verde	Thiès, Senegal
19:00 UTC+0	Gueye 55'; Mané 86' (pen.)	Report		Stadium: Stade Lat-Dior; Referee: Maudo Jallow (Gambia)

1 September 2021 2022 World Cup qualification	Central African Republic	1–1	Cape Verde	Douala, Cameroon
14:00 UTC+1	Toropité 53'	Report	J. Tavares 36'	Stadium: Japoma Stadium; Referee: Peter Waweru (Kenya)

7 September 2021 2022 World Cup qualification	Cape Verde	1–2	Nigeria	Mindelo, Cape Verde
15:00 UTC−1	D. Tavares 19'	Report	Osimhen 30'; Rocha 76' (o.g.)	Stadium: Estádio Municipal Adérito Sena; Referee: Samir Guezzaz (Morocco)

7 October 2021 2022 World Cup qualification	Liberia	1–2	Cape Verde	Accra, Ghana
13:00 UTC+0	Harmon 45+3'	Report	Monteiro 52'; Rodrigues 90+2'	Stadium: Accra Sports Stadium; Referee: Jean Ouattara (Burkina Faso)

10 October 2021 2022 World Cup qualification	Cape Verde	1–0	Liberia	Mindelo, Cape Verde
15:00 UTC−1	R. Mendes 90'	Report		Stadium: Estádio Municipal Adérito Sena; Referee: Mohamed Ali Moussa (Niger)

13 November 2021 2022 World Cup qualification	Cape Verde	2–1	Central African Republic	Mindelo, Cape Verde
15:00 UTC−1	J. Tavares 51'; Stopira 75'	Report	Ngoma 11'	Stadium: Estádio Municipal Adérito Sena; Referee: Daniel Nii Laryea (Ghana)

16 November 2021 2022 World Cup qualification	Nigeria	1–1	Cape Verde	Lagos, Nigeria
17:00 UTC+1	Osimhen 1'	Report	Stopira 5'	Stadium: Teslim Balogun Stadium; Referee: Mustapha Ghorbal (Algeria)

=== 2022 ===
9 January 2022 2021 AFCON GS	Ethiopia	0–1	Cape Verde	Yaoundé, Cameroon
20:00 UTC+1		Report	J. Tavares 45+1'	Stadium: Olembe Stadium; Referee: Hélder Martins Rodrigues de Carvalho (Angola)

13 January 2022 2021 AFCON GS	Cape Verde	0–1	Burkina Faso	Yaoundé, Cameroon
20:00 UTC+1		Report	Bandé 39'	Stadium: Olembe Stadium; Referee: Amin Omar (Egypt)

17 January 2022 2021 AFCON GS	Cape Verde	1–1	Cameroon	Yaoundé, Cameroon
17:00 UTC+1	Rodrigues 53'	Report	Aboubakar 39'	Stadium: Olembe Stadium; Referee: Sadok Selmi (Tunisia)

25 January 2022 2021 AFCON R16	Senegal	2–0	Cape Verde	Bafoussam, Cameroon
17:00 UTC+1	Mané 63'; B. Dieng 90+2'	Report	Andrade (red card) 21'; Vozinha (red card) 57'	Stadium: Kouekong Stadium; Referee: Lahlou Benbraham (Algeria)

23 March 2022 Friendly	Guadeloupe	0–2	Cape Verde	Orléans, France
20:00 UTC+1			J. Cabral 13'; Bebé 50'	Stadium: Stade de la Source

25 March 2022 Friendly	Liechtenstein	0–6	Cape Verde	San Pedro del Pinatar, Spain
17:00 UTC+1		Report	G. Tavares 18', 38', 45+1'; L. Semedo 34'; Bebé 73', 83'	Stadium: Pinatar Arena; Referee: Dario Bel (Croatia)

28 March 2022 Friendly	Cape Verde	2–0	San Marino	San Pedro del Pinatar, Spain
17:00 UTC+2	Rocha 18'; Papalélé 56'	Report		Stadium: Pinatar Arena; Referee: Guillermo Cuadra Fernández (Spain)

3 June 2022 2023 AFCON qualification	Burkina Faso	2–0	Cape Verde	Marrakesh, Morocco
20:00 UTC+1	Bandé 58'; Ouattara 88'	Report		Stadium: Marrakesh Stadium; Referee: Daniel Nii Laryea (Ghana)

7 June 2022 2023 AFCON qualification	Cape Verde	2–0	Togo	Marrakesh, Morocco
17:00 UTC+1	J. Tavares 10'; Monteiro 90+4'	Report		Stadium: Marrakesh Stadium; Referee: Mehrez Melki (Tunisia)

12 June 2022 Friendly	Ecuador	1–0	Cape Verde	Fort Lauderdale, United States
20:00 UTC−4	J. Caicedo 38' (pen.)	Report		Stadium: DRV PNK Stadium; Referee: Moet Gaymes (Saint Vincent and the Grenadines)

23 September 2022 Friendly	Bahrain	1–2	Cape Verde	Riffa, Bahrain
18:30 UTC+3	Haram 59' (pen.)		Al-Romaihi 11' (o.g.); R. Mendes 55'	Stadium: Bahrain National Stadium; Referee: Ahmed Al-Kaf (Oman)

=== 2023 ===
24 March 2023 2023 AFCON qualification	Cape Verde	0–0	Eswatini	Praia, Cape Verde
15:00 UTC−1		Report		Stadium: Estádio Nacional de Cabo Verde; Referee: Charles Bulu (Ghana)

28 March 2023 2023 AFCON qualification	Eswatini	0–1	Cape Verde	Mbombela, South Africa
15:00 UTC+2		Report	Mandes 56'	Stadium: Mbombela Stadium; Referee: Jean Ishimwe (Rwanda)

12 June 2023 Friendly	Morocco	0–0	Cape Verde	Rabat, Morocco
		Report		Stadium: Prince Moulay Abdellah Stadium

18 June 2023 2023 AFCON qualification	Cape Verde	3–1	Burkina Faso	Praia, Cape Verde
15:00 UTC−1	Bebé 7'; Fernandes 67'; Clé 90+4'	Report	Dayo 45+3'	Stadium: Estádio Nacional de Cabo Verde; Referee: Haythem Guirat (Tunisia)

10 September 2023 2023 AFCON qualification	Togo	3–2	Cape Verde	Lomé, Togo
16:00 UTC+0	Denkey 40' (pen.), 77'; Ouattara 87'	Report	K. Pina 4'; G. Tavares 20'	Stadium: Stade de Kégué; Referee: Mutaz Ibrahim (Libya)

12 October 2023 Friendly	Algeria	5–1	Cape Verde	Constantine, Algeria
20:00 UTC+1	Amoura 12'; Aouar 39', 41'; Zerrouki 61'; Slimani 89' (pen.)	Report	Bebé 55'	Stadium: Mohamed Hamlaoui Stadium; Referee: Mehrez Melki (Tunisia)

17 October 2023 Friendly	Cape Verde	1–2	Comoros	Istres, France
	Rocha 2'	Report	Almihdhoiri 48'; Mahamoud 86' (pen.)	Stadium: Stade Parsemain

16 November 2023 2026 World Cup qualification	Cape Verde	0–0	Angola	Praia, Cape Verde
18:00 UTC−1		Report		Stadium: Estádio Nacional de Cabo Verde; Referee: Youcef Gamouh (Algeria)

21 November 2023 2026 World Cup qualification	Eswatini	0–2	Cape Verde	Mbombela, South Africa
15:00 UTC+2		Report	R. Mendes 17'; Monteiro 38'	Stadium: Mbombela Stadium; Referee: Sabri Mohamed Fadul (Sudan)

=== 2024 ===
10 January 2024 Friendly	Tunisia	2–0	Cape Verde	Tunis, Tunisia
18:30 UTC+1	Achouri 12'; Msakni 53'	Report (Soccerway); Report (Eurosport)		Stadium: Stade Hammadi Agrebi

14 January 2024 2023 AFCON GS	Ghana	1–2	Cape Verde	Abidjan, Ivory Coast
20:00 UTC+0	Djiku 56'	Report	Monteiro 17'; Rodrigues 90+2'	Stadium: Felix Houphouet Boigny Stadium; Attendance: 11,943; Referee: Jean-Jacques Ndala Ngambo (DR Congo)

19 January 2024 2023 AFCON GS	Cape Verde	3–0	Mozambique	Abidjan, Ivory Coast
20:00	Bebé 32'; R. Mendes 51'; K. Pina 69'	Report		Stadium: Felix Houphouet Boigny Stadium; Attendance: 5,794; Referee: Samir Guezzaz (Morocco)

22 January 2024 2023 AFCON GS	Cape Verde	2–2	Egypt	Yamoussoukro, Ivory Coast
20:00	G. Tavares 45+1'; Teixeira 90+9'	Report	Trézéguet 50'; Mostafa 90+3'	Stadium: Charles Konan Banny Stadium; Referee: Alhadi Allaou Mahamat (Chad)

29 January 2024 2023 AFCON R16	Cape Verde	1–0	Mauritania	Abidjan, Ivory Coast
20:00	R. Mendes 88' (pen.)	Report		Stadium: Felix Houphouet Boigny Stadium; Attendance: 16,088; Referee: Mohamed Adel (Egypt)

3 February 2024 2023 AFCON QF	Cape Verde	0–0 (a.e.t.) (1–2 p)	South Africa	Yamoussoukro, Ivory Coast
		Report		Stadium: Charles Konan Banny Stadium; Referee: Jean-Jacques Ndala Ngambo (DR Congo)
	Penalties
	Bebé (penalty missed); W. Semedo (penalty missed); L. Duarte (penalty missed); Teixeira (penalty scored); Andrade (penalty missed)		(penalty scored) Mokoena; (penalty missed) Lepasa; (penalty missed) Modiba; (penalty scored) Mvala

21 March 2024 2024 FIFA Series	Cape Verde	1–0	Guyana	Jeddah, Saudi Arabia
22:00 UTC+3	R. Mendes 2'	Report		Stadium: Prince Abdullah Al-Faisal Sports City; Referee: Shukri Al-Hunfush (Saudi Arabia)

25 March 2024 2024 FIFA Series	Cape Verde	1–0	Equatorial Guinea	Jeddah, Saudi Arabia
22:00 UTC+3	J. Cabral 64'	Report		Stadium: Prince Abdullah Al-Faisal Sports City; Referee: Qasim Matar Al-Hatmi (Oman)

6 September 2024 2025 AFCON qualification	Egypt	3–0	Cape Verde	Cairo, Egypt
22:00 UTC+2	Rabia 23'; Marmoush 45+1'; Adel 70'	Report		Stadium: Cairo International Stadium; Referee: Abongile Tom (South Africa)

10 September 2024 2025 AFCON qualification	Cape Verde	2–0	Mauritania	Praia, Cape Verde
18:00 UTC−1	R. Mendes 28' (pen.), 75'	Report		Stadium: Estádio Nacional de Cabo Verde; Referee: Mutaz Ibrahim (Libya)

10 October 2024 2025 AFCON qualification	Cape Verde	0–1	Botswana	Praia, Cape Verde
15:00 UTC−1		Report	Orebonye 2'	Stadium: Estádio Nacional de Cabo Verde; Referee: Samir Guezzaz (Morocco)

15 October 2024 2025 AFCON qualification	Botswana	1–0	Cape Verde	Francistown, Botswana
18:00 UTC+2	Sesinyi 52'	Report		Stadium: Obed Itani Chilume Stadium; Attendance: 8,000; Referee: Messie Nkounkou (Congo)

15 November 2024 2025 AFCON qualification	Cape Verde	1–1	Egypt	Praia, Cape Verde
14:00 UTC−1	R. Mendes 63' (pen.)	Report	Mohamed 31'	Stadium: Estádio Nacional de Cabo Verde; Referee: Djindo Louis Houngnandande (Benin)

19 November 2024 2025 AFCON qualification	Mauritania	1–0	Cape Verde	Nouakchott, Mauritania
15:00 UTC+0	Soueid 45+4'	Report		Stadium: Cheikha Ould Boïdiya Stadium; Referee: Lahlou Benbraham (Algeria)

=== 2025 ===
20 March 2025 2026 World Cup qualification	Cape Verde	1–0	Mauritius	Praia, Cape Verde
17:00	Y. Semedo 84'	Report		Stadium: Estádio Nacional de Cabo Verde; Referee: Yannick Malala Kabanga (DR Congo)

25 March 2025 2026 World Cup qualification	Angola	1–2	Cape Verde	Luanda, Angola
17:00	Dala 50'	Report	Livramento 45+2', 63'	Stadium: Estádio 11 de Novembro; Referee: Mustapha Ghorbal (Algeria)

29 May 2025 Friendly	Malaysia	0–3; Awarded (Note: Due to the Malaysian football naturalisation scandal, the FIFA Disciplinary Committee awarded the match, which had originally ended as a 1–1 draw, as a 3–0 win to Cape Verde on 17 December 2025, as Malaysia had fielded the ineligible players Gabriel Palmero and Hector Hevel. The Football Association of Malaysia (FAM) were also fined CHF 10,000.)	Cape Verde	Kuala Lumpur, Malaysia
21:00 UTC+8	Paulo Josué 78'	Report	Lopes Cabral 8'	Stadium: Kuala Lumpur Stadium; Attendance: 10,708; Referee: Mongkolchai Pechhri (Thailand)

3 June 2025 Closed-door friendly^{1}	Malaysia	0–3	Cape Verde	Kuala Lumpur, Malaysia
21:00 UTC+8		Report	Livramento 35', 48'; H. Tavares 55'	Stadium: Bukit Jalil National Stadium; Attendance: 0

8 June 2025 Friendly	Georgia	1–1	Cape Verde	Kutaisi, Georgia
	Lobzhanidze 45+1'	Report	R. Mendes 78'	Stadium: Ramaz Shengelia Stadium; Referee: Henrik Nalbandyan (Armenia)

4 September 2025 2026 World Cup qualification	Mauritius	0–2	Cape Verde	Saint Pierre, Mauritius
20:00 UTC+4		Report	J. Cabral 22'; Diney 70'	Stadium: Côte d'Or National Sports Complex; Referee: Mohamed Diraneh Guedi (Djibouti)

9 September 2025 2026 World Cup qualification	Cape Verde	1–0	Cameroon	Praia, Cape Verde
	Livramento 54'	Report		Stadium: Estádio Nacional de Cabo Verde; Referee: Daniel Nii Laryea (Ghana)

8 October 2025 2026 World Cup qualification	Libya	3–3	Cape Verde	Tripoli, Libya
15:00 UTC+2	Pico 1' (o.g.); El Maremi 42'; Al-Shalui 58'	Report	Arcanjo 29'; Lopes Cabral 76'; W. Semedo 82'	Stadium: Tripoli Stadium; Referee: Mahmood Ali Mahmood Ismail (Sudan)

13 October 2025 2026 World Cup qualification	Cape Verde	3–0	Eswatini	Praia, Cape Verde
15:00 UTC−1	Livramento 48'; W. Semedo 54'; Stopira 90+1'	Report		Stadium: Estádio Nacional de Cabo Verde; Referee: Ahmed Arajiga (Tanzania)

13 November 2025 2025 Al Ain International Cup SF	Iran	0–0 (5–4 p)	Cape Verde	Al Ain, United Arab Emirates
20:00 UTC+4		Report		Stadium: Hazza bin Zayed Stadium; Referee: Mohamed Al-Harmoodi (United Arab Emirates)
	Penalties
	Noorafkan (penalty scored); Alipour (penalty scored); Mohebi (penalty scored); Ezatolahi (penalty scored); Taremi (penalty scored)		(penalty scored) Rodrigues; (penalty scored) Diney; (penalty scored) Moreira; (penalty missed) L. Duarte; (penalty scored) Arcanjo

17 November 2025 2025 Al Ain International Cup 3rd	Cape Verde	1–1 (0–2 p)	Egypt	Al Ain, United Arab Emirates
17:00	Rodrigues 7' (pen.)	Report	Marmoush 57'	Stadium: Hazza bin Zayed Stadium; Attendance: 2,300; Referee: Rawdha Al Mansoori (United Arab Emirates)
	Penalties
	Diney (penalty missed); Monteiro (penalty missed); K. Pina (penalty missed); R. Mendes (penalty missed)		(penalty missed) Marmoush; (penalty scored) Abdelmaguid; (penalty scored) Hamdy; (penalty missed) Faisal

=== 2026 ===
27 March 2026 2026 FIFA Series	Chile	4–2	Cape Verde	Auckland, New Zealand
16:00 UTC+13	Brereton 16'; M. Gutiérrez 58'; Loyola 67'; Tapia 79'	Report	Livramento 21'; Diney (yellow card) 30' (yellow-red card) 43'; Lopes Cabral 45+3'	Stadium: Eden Park; Referee: Calvin Berg (New Zealand)

30 March 2026 2026 FIFA Series	Cape Verde	1–1 (4–2 p)	Finland	Auckland, New Zealand
16:00 UTC+13	Pires 67'	Report	Skyttä 45+4'	Stadium: Eden Park; Attendance: 2,060; Referee: Anna-Marie Keighley (New Zealand)
	Penalties
	Lopes Cabral (penalty scored); J. Cabral (penalty missed); K. Pina (penalty scored); Da Costa (penalty scored); R. Mendes (penalty scored)		(penalty scored) Walta; (penalty scored) Valakari; (penalty missed) Keskinen; (penalty missed) Oksanen

31 May 2026 Friendly	Cape Verde	3–0	Serbia	Lisbon, Portugal
11:00 UTC+1	K. Pina 10'; L. Duarte 59'; Benchimol 63'	Report		Stadium: Estádio do Restelo; Attendance: 7,500; Referee: João Gonçalves (Portugal)

6 June 2026 Friendly	Cape Verde	3–0	Bermuda	East Hartford, United States
16:00 UTC−4	W. Semedo 33'; Rodrigues 49'; Da Costa 90+1'	Report		Stadium: Pratt & Whitney Stadium at Rentschler Field

15 June 2026 2026 World Cup GS	Spain	0–0	Cape Verde	Atlanta, United States
12:00 UTC−4		Report		Stadium: Mercedes-Benz Stadium; Attendance: 67,640; Referee: Adham Makhadmeh (Jordan)

21 June 2026 2026 World Cup GS	Uruguay	2–2	Cape Verde	Miami Gardens, United States
18:00 UTC−4	M. Araújo 44'; Canobbio 45+6'	Report	K. Pina 21'; Varela 61'	Stadium: Hard Rock Stadium; Attendance: 64,003; Referee: Espen Eskås (Norway)

26 June 2026 2026 World Cup GS	Cape Verde	0–0	Saudi Arabia	Houston, United States
19:00 UTC−5		Report		Stadium: NRG Stadium; Attendance: 68,278; Referee: François Letexier (France)

3 July 2026 2026 World Cup R32	Argentina	3–2 (a.e.t.)	Cape Verde	Miami Gardens, United States
18:00 UTC−4	Messi 29'; Li. Martínez 92'; Diney 111' (o.g.)	Report	D. Duarte 59'; Lopes Cabral 103'	Stadium: Hard Rock Stadium; Attendance: 64,478; Referee: Drew Fischer (Canada)

25 September 2026 2027 AFCON qualification	Mali	3–1	Cape Verde	Bamako, Mali
21:00 UTC+0	Nene 39', 51'; Tia 5'	Report	Lopes Cabral 10'	Stadium: 26 March Stadium; Referee: Jean-Jacques Ndala (DR Congo)

29 September 2026 2027 AFCON qualification	Cape Verde	1–2	Rwanda	Praia, Cape Verde
18:00 UTC+0	Benchimol 40'	Report	Niyomugabo 45+2'; Iradukunda 52'	Stadium: Estádio Nacional de Cabo Verde; Referee: Louis Houngnandande (Benin)

Notes

- ^{1} Non-FIFA 'A' international match
