= Amílcar Cabral Cup =

- Organiser(s): WAFU
- Founded: 1979
- Abolished: 2007
- Region: West Africa (Zone 2)
- Teams: 8
- Last champions: Mali
- Most championships: Senegal (8 titles)

The Amílcar Cabral Cup was an international association football tournament for Western African nations. The competition originally was played on an annual basis until 1989, since then it was played on a biennial basis Tournament that was only for under-20 youth teams.

The tournament is named after Amílcar Cabral. There has been no edition since 2007. Mauritania was to host in 2009, then rescheduled the tournament to 2010 and later cancelled it altogether.

== History ==
In 1970 a predecessor tournament was started. The Tournoi de la Zone II organized by the Conseil Supérieur du Sport en Afrique (CSSA) was held five times until 1977 with Mali winning three and Guinea winning two titles.

== Participant Nations ==
The following eight teams have regularly participated in the tournament. The teams are all in Confederation of African Football's (CAF) Zone 2, i.e. Western Africa. In some years, when a team withdrew a guest team was invited, like Benin in 2001.

- Cape Verde
- Gambia
- Guinea
- Guinea-Bissau
- Mali
- Mauritania
- Senegal
- Sierra Leone

== Results ==
Year	Host	Final			Third Place Match
Year	Host	Champion	Score	Second Place	Third Place	Score	Fourth Place
1979; Details	Guinea-Bissau	Senegal	1–0	Mali	Guinea	2–2 (5–4) pk	Guinea-Bissau
1980; Details	The Gambia	Senegal	1–0	Gambia	Guinea	w/o	Mauritania
1981; Details	Mali	Guinea	0–0 (6–5) pk	Mali	Senegal	5–1	Cape Verde
1982; Details	Cape Verde Islands	Guinea	3–0	Senegal	Mali	2–1	Cape Verde
1983; Details	Mauritania	Senegal	3–0	Guinea-Bissau	Mali	2–0	Mauritania
1984; Details	Sierra Leone	Senegal	0–0 (5–4) pk	Sierra Leone	Mali	2–0	Gambia
1985; Details	The Gambia	Senegal	1–0	Gambia	Mali	1–0	Cape Verde
1986; Details	Senegal	Senegal	3–1	Sierra Leone	Third place match not played
1987; Details	Guinea	Guinea	1–0	Mali	Senegal	0–0 (3–0) pk	Sierra Leone
1988; Details	Guinea-Bissau	Guinea	0–0 ^{[Note]} (3–2) pk	Mali	Senegal	2–1	Sierra Leone
1989; Details	Mali	Mali	3–0	Guinea	Cape Verde	1–0	Sierra Leone
1991; Details	Senegal	Senegal	1–0	Cape Verde	Third place match not played
1993; Details	Sierra Leone	Sierra Leone	2–0	Senegal	Gambia	2–0	Mali
1995; Details	Mauritania	Sierra Leone	0–0 (4–3) pk	Mauritania	Cape Verde	1–0	Guinea-Bissau
1997; Details	The Gambia	Mali	1–0	Senegal	Guinea	2–2 (5–4) pk	Gambia
2000; Details	Cape Verde Islands	Cape Verde	1–0	Senegal	Guinea	2–0	Mali
2001; Details	Mali	Senegal U23	3–1	Gambia	Mali	2–1	Guinea-Bissau
2005; Details	Guinea	Guinea	1–0	Senegal U23	Mali B	1–0	Guinea-Bissau
2007; Details	Guinea-Bissau	Mali B	2–1	Cape Verde	Senegal U23	2–1	Guinea-Bissau

Note: There are contradictory reports of this match. According to the RSSSF page for the 1988 tournament, the match ended in 0–0 and Guinea won 4–2 on penalties. On a list of international matches of 1988, the match ended in 0–0 and Guinea won 3–2 on penalties. According to a head-to-head search between Guinea and Mali on FIFA website, Guinea won 3–2 in regular time.

=== Winners ===
Nation	Wins	Year(s)
Senegal	8	1979, 1980, 1983, 1984, 1985, 1986, 1991, 2001
Guinea	5	1981, 1982, 1987, 1988, 2005
Mali	3	1989, 1997, 2007
Sierra Leone	2	1993, 1995
Cape Verde	1	2000

== Tournoi de la Zone II ==
Held from 1970 to 1977 under the hospicies of the Conseil Supérieur du Sport en Afrique (CSSA), the Tournoi de la Zone II was a predecessor tournament of the Amílcar Cabral Cup.

Year	Host	Final			Third place match		
Year	Host	Winner	Score	Runner-up	Third	Score	Fourth
1970	Bamako, Mali	Mali	^{n/a}	Guinea	Senegal^{1}		
1972	Dakar, Senegal	Guinea	^{n/a}	Senegal	Gambia	^{n/a}	Mali
1975	Bissau, Guinea-Bissau	Guinea	2–1	Guinea-Bissau	No third place match		
1976	Banjul, Gambia	Mali	1–0	Guinea	No third place match		
1977	Bissau, Guinea-Bissau	Mali					

^n/a A round-robin tournament determined the final standings.
^1 Senegal represented by ASFA Dakar.
