= Fodé Camara (footballer, born 1973) =

Guinean footballer

Personal information
- Full name: Fodé Camara
- Date of birth: 9 December 1973 (age 52)
- Place of birth: Guinea
- Position: Forward

Team information
- Current team: PSM Makassar (assistant coach)

Senior career*
Years	Team	Apps	(Gls)
1991–1995	Sint-Niklase		
1995–1996	K.S.V. Waregem		
1996–1997	Kortrijk		
1997–1998	Waregem		
1998–1999	Harelbeke		
1999–2000	Waregem		
2000	Yunnan Hongta		
2001	Chengdu Wuniu		
2001–2002	Kortrijk		
2003–2006	PKT Bontang	94	(60)
2006–2007	Kortrijk		
2007	PKT Bontang		
2008–2010	Fello Star		
2010–2011	Nonthaburi F.C.		
Total		94+	(60+)

International career
1988–2002	Guinea	42	(12)

Managerial career
- 2012–2013: Bontang F.C.
- 2013–: PSM Makassar (assistant coach)
- * Club domestic league appearances and goals

Fodé Camara (born 9 December 1973) is a Guinea professional footballer who played as a forward. He played for the Guinea national team at international level.

== Career ==
Camara began his professional career in Belgium with Sint-Niklase. He played for several other Belgian clubs, including Waregem and Kortrijk. He scored a goal for Kortrijk as they achieved their biggest margin of victory over his-former club Waregem on 25 January 1998.

Camara made several appearances for the Guinea national football team, including appearances at the 1994 and 1998 African Cup of Nations finals. He played for Guinea at the 1989 FIFA U-17 World Championship.

In 2012 Camara returned to Indonesia for managed his former club Bontang FC.
