= 1993 Amílcar Cabral Cup =

Tournament details
- Host country: Sierra Leone
- Dates: November 16–December 5
- Teams: 7

Final positions
- Champions: Sierra Leone (1st title)
- Runners-up: Senegal
- Third place: Gambia

Tournament statistics
- Matches played: 13
- Goals scored: 24 (1.85 per match)

The 1993 Amílcar Cabral Cup was held in Freetown, Sierra Leone.

== Group stage ==
=== Group A ===
Team	Pts	Pld	W	D	L	GF	GA	GD
Mali	5	3	2	1	0	4	0	+4
Senegal	4	3	1	1	1	4	1	+3
Guinea-Bissau	3	3	1	1	1	1	3	–2
Mauritania	1	3	0	1	2	0	5	–5

November 27, 1993

Mali	1 – 0	Senegal

November 27, 1993

Guinea-Bissau	1 – 0	Mauritania

November 29, 1993

Mali	3 – 0	Guinea-Bissau

November 29, 1993

Senegal	4 – 0	Mauritania

December 1, 1993

Mali	0 – 0	Mauritania

December 1, 1993

Senegal	0 – 0	Guinea-Bissau

=== Group B ===
Team	Pts	Pld	W	D	L	GF	GA	GD
Gambia	3	2	1	1	0	3	2	+1
Sierra Leone	2	2	0	2	0	2	2	0
Guinea	1	2	0	1	1	2	3	–1

November 26, 1993

Sierra Leone	1 – 1	Guinea

November 28, 1993

Gambia	2 – 1	Guinea

November 30, 1993

Gambia	1 – 1	Sierra Leone

== Knockout stage ==
=== Semi-finals ===
December 3, 1993

Sierra Leone	2 – 0	Mali

December 3, 1993

Senegal	2 – 0	Gambia

=== Third place match ===
December 5, 1993

Gambia	2 – 0	Mali

=== Final ===
December 5, 1993

Sierra Leone	2 – 0	Senegal
