= 1980 Amílcar Cabral Cup =

Tournament details
- Host country: Gambia
- Dates: February 9–18
- Teams: 6
- Venue: (in 1 host city)

Final positions
- Champions: Senegal (2nd title)
- Runners-up: Gambia
- Third place: Guinea

Tournament statistics
- Matches played: 10
- Goals scored: 24 (2.4 per match)

The 1980 Amílcar Cabral Cup was held in Banjul, Gambia.

== Group stage ==
=== Group A ===
Team	Pts	Pld	W	D	L	GF	GA	GD
Gambia	3	2	1	1	0	2	0	+2
Guinea	3	2	1	1	0	2	1	+1
Guinea-Bissau	0	2	0	0	2	1	4	–3

Feb 9, 1980

Gambia	2 – 0	Guinea-Bissau

Feb 11, 1980

Guinea	2 – 1	Guinea-Bissau

Feb 13, 1980

Guinea	0 – 0	Gambia

=== Group B ===
Team	Pts	Pld	W	D	L	GF	GA	GD
Senegal	2	2	1	0	1	2	2	0
Mauritania	2	2	1	0	1	2	2	0
Mali	2	2	1	0	1	1	1	0

Feb 10, 1980

Mali	1 – 0	Senegal

Feb 12, 1980

Mauritania	1 – 0	Mali

Feb 14, 1980

Senegal	2 – 1	Mauritania

== Knockout stage ==
=== Semi-finals ===
Feb 16, 1980

Senegal	2 – 1	Guinea

Feb 16, 1980

Gambia	2 – 2 (7 – 6 pen.)	Mauritania

=== Fifth place match ===
Feb 17, 1980

Mali	4 – 2	Guinea-Bissau

=== Third place match ===
Feb 18, 1980

Guinea	(not played)	Mauritania

Walkover. Awarded 2–0 to Guinea.

=== Final ===
Feb 18, 1980

Senegal	1 – 0	Gambia
