= 1997 Amílcar Cabral Cup =

Tournament details
- Host country: Gambia
- Dates: November 28–December 7
- Teams: 8

Final positions
- Champions: Mali (2nd title)
- Runners-up: Senegal
- Third place: Guinea

Tournament statistics
- Matches played: 16
- Goals scored: 43 (2.69 per match)

The 1997 Amílcar Cabral Cup was held in Banjul, Gambia.

== Group stage ==
=== Group A ===
Team	Pts	Pld	W	D	L	GF	GA	GD
Gambia	7	3	2	1	0	5	2	+3
Senegal	5	3	1	2	0	3	1	+2
Mauritania	2	3	0	2	1	4	5	–1
Cape Verde	1	3	0	1	2	3	7	–4

November 28, 1997

Gambia	3 – 1	Cape Verde

November 28, 1997

Mauritania	1 – 1	Senegal

November 30, 1997

Gambia	2 – 1	Mauritania

November 30, 1997

Senegal	2 – 0	Cape Verde

December 2, 1997

Gambia	0 – 0	Senegal

December 2, 1997

Cape Verde	2 – 2	Mauritania

=== Group B ===
Team	Pts	Pld	W	D	L	GF	GA	GD
Guinea	7	3	2	1	0	5	0	+5
Mali	5	3	1	2	0	7	2	+5
Sierra Leone	4	3	1	1	1	3	5	–2
Guinea-Bissau	0	3	0	0	3	2	10	–8

November 29, 1997

Guinea	0 – 0	Mali

November 29, 1997

Sierra Leone	2 – 1	Guinea-Bissau

December 1, 1997

Guinea	3 – 0	Sierra Leone

December 1, 1997

Mali	6 – 1	Guinea-Bissau

December 3, 1997

Mali	1 – 1	Sierra Leone

December 3, 1997

Guinea	2 – 0	Guinea-Bissau

== Knockout stage ==
=== Semi-finals ===
December 5, 1997

Gambia	1 – 2	Mali

December 5, 1997

Guinea	1 – 2	Senegal

=== Third place match ===
December 7, 1997

Guinea	2 – 2 (5 – 4 pen.)	Gambia

=== Final ===
December 7, 1997

Mali	1 – 0	Senegal
Yaya Dissa 18'
