= 1984 Amílcar Cabral Cup =

Tournament details
- Host country: Sierra Leone
- Dates: February 8–19
- Teams: 8
- Venue(s): (in 1 host city)

Final positions
- Champions: Senegal (4th title)
- Runners-up: Sierra Leone
- Third place: Mali

Tournament statistics
- Matches played: 16
- Goals scored: 31 (1.94 per match)

The 1984 Amílcar Cabral Cup was held in Freetown, Sierra Leone.

== Group stage ==
=== Group A ===
Team	Pts	Pld	W	D	L	GF	GA	GD
Sierra Leone	5	3	2	1	0	3	0	+3
Gambia	3	3	1	1	1	4	3	+1
Guinea	3	3	1	1	1	3	3	0
Cape Verde	1	3	0	1	2	1	3	–4

Feb 8, 1984

Sierra Leone	2 – 0	Cape Verde

Feb 8, 1984

Gambia	2 – 2	Guinea

Feb 10, 1984

Sierra Leone	1 – 0	Gambia

Feb 10, 1984

Guinea	1 – 1	Cape Verde

Feb 12, 1984

Gambia	2 – 0	Cape Verde

Feb 12, 1984

Guinea	0 – 0	Sierra Leone

=== Group B ===
Team	Pts	Pld	W	D	L	GF	GA	GD
Senegal	4	3	2	0	1	9	3	+6
Mali	4	3	2	0	1	2	1	+1
Guinea-Bissau	4	3	2	0	1	5	4	+1
Mauritania	0	3	0	0	3	1	9	–8

It is unknown why Mali was placed second over Guinea-Bissau, as all possible tie-breakers (e.g. goals scored, head-to-head) are for Guinea-Bissau's favor.

Feb 9, 1984

Senegal	3 – 2	Guinea-Bissau

Feb 9, 1984

Mali	1 – 0	Mauritania

Feb 11, 1984

Guinea-Bissau	2 – 1	Mauritania

Feb 11, 1984

Mali	1 – 0	Senegal

Feb 13, 1984

Senegal	6 – 0	Mauritania

Feb 13, 1984

Guinea-Bissau	1 – 0	Mali

== Knockout stage ==
=== Semi-finals ===
Feb 15, 1984

Senegal	1 – 0	Gambia

Feb 16, 1984

Sierra Leone	0 – 0 (4 – 2 pen.)	Mali

=== Third place match ===
Feb 18, 1984

Mali	2 – 0	Gambia

=== Final ===
Feb 19, 1984

Senegal	0 – 0 (5 – 4 pen.)	Sierra Leone
