= 1989 Amílcar Cabral Cup =

Tournament details
- Host country: Mali
- Dates: May 24–June 4
- Teams: 7
- Venue(s): (in 1 host city)

Final positions
- Champions: Mali (1st title)
- Runners-up: Guinea

Tournament statistics
- Matches played: 13
- Goals scored: 31 (2.38 per match)

The 1989 Amílcar Cabral Cup was held in Bamako, Mali.

== Group stage ==
=== Group A ===
Team	Pts	Pld	W	D	L	GF	GA	GD
Mali	4	3	1	2	0	5	4	+1
Cape Verde	3	3	1	1	1	5	5	0
Guinea-Bissau	3	3	1	1	1	4	4	0
Senegal	2	3	0	2	1	3	4	–1

May 24, 1989

Guinea-Bissau	0 – 0	Senegal

May 25, 1989

Mali	1 – 1	Cape Verde

May 27, 1989

Senegal	2 – 2	Mali

May 27, 1989

Guinea-Bissau	3 – 2	Cape Verde

May 29, 1989

Mali	2 – 1	Guinea-Bissau

May 29, 1989

Cape Verde	2 – 1	Senegal

=== Group B ===
Team	Pts	Pld	W	D	L	GF	GA	GD
Guinea	4	2	2	0	0	4	1	+3
Sierra Leone	2	2	1	0	1	2	2	0
Mauritania	0	2	0	0	2	2	5	–3

May 25, 1989

Sierra Leone	2 – 1	Mauritania

May 27, 1989

Guinea	1 – 0	Sierra Leone

May 30, 1989

Guinea	3 – 1	Mauritania

== Knockout stage ==
=== Semi-finals ===
June 2, 1989

Mali	1 – 0	Sierra Leone

June 2, 1989

Guinea	1 – 0	Cape Verde

=== Third place match ===
June 3, 1989

Cape Verde	1 – 0	Sierra Leone

=== Final ===
June 4, 1989

Mali	3 – 0	Guinea
