= 1987 Amílcar Cabral Cup =

Tournament details
- Host country: Guinea
- Dates: February 21–March 3
- Teams: 7
- Venue(s): (in 1 host city)

Final positions
- Champions: Guinea (3rd title)
- Runners-up: Mali

Tournament statistics
- Matches played: 14
- Goals scored: 11 (0.79 per match)

The 1987 Amílcar Cabral Cup was held in Conakry, Guinea.

== Group stage ==
=== Group A ===
Team	Pts	Pld	W	D	L	GF	GA	GD
Guinea	4	3	1	2	0	1	0	+1
Mali	4	3	1	2	0	1	0	+1
Guinea-Bissau	3	3	0	3	0	1	1	0
Mauritania	1	3	0	1	2	1	3	–2

Feb 22, 1987

Mali	0 – 0	Guinea-Bissau

Feb 22, 1987

Guinea	1 – 0	Mauritania

Feb 24, 1987

Guinea	0 – 0	Mali

Feb 24, 1987

Guinea-Bissau	1 – 1	Mauritania

Feb 26, 1987

Guinea	0 – 0	Guinea-Bissau

Feb 24, 1987

Mali	1 – 0	Mauritania

=== Group B ===
Team	Pts	Pld	W	D	L	GF	GA	GD
Sierra Leone	4	2	2	0	0	3	0	+3
Senegal	2	2	1	0	1	2	1	+1
Cape Verde	0	2	0	0	2	0	4	–4

Feb 23, 1987

Sierra Leone	1 – 0	Senegal

Feb 25, 1987

Senegal	2 – 0	Cape Verde

Feb 27, 1987

Sierra Leone	2 – 0	Cape Verde

== Knockout stage ==
=== Semi-finals ===
Mar 1, 1987

Guinea	1 – 0	Senegal

Mar 1, 1987

Mali	0 – 0 (aet) (4 – 1 pen.)	Sierra Leone

=== Fifth place match ===
Mar 2, 1987

Cape Verde	0 – 0 (aet) (5 – 4 pen.)	Guinea-Bissau

=== Third place match ===
Mar 2, 1987

Senegal	0 – 0 (aet) (3 – 0 pen.)	Sierra Leone

=== Final ===
Mar 3, 1987

Guinea	1 – 0	Mali
