= 1991 Amílcar Cabral Cup =

Tournament details
- Host country: Senegal
- Dates: November 22–December 2
- Teams: 7

Final positions
- Champions: Senegal (7th title)
- Runners-up: Cape Verde

Tournament statistics
- Matches played: 12
- Goals scored: 16 (1.33 per match)

The 1991 Amílcar Cabral Cup was held in Dakar, Senegal.

== Group stage ==
=== Group A ===
Team	Pts	Pld	W	D	L	GF	GA	GD
Sierra Leone	4	3	1	2	0	2	1	+1
Gambia	4	3	1	2	0	1	0	+1
Mali	3	3	1	1	1	3	2	+1
Guinea	1	3	0	1	2	0	3	–3

November 23, 1991

Gambia	1 – 0	Mali

November 24, 1991

Sierra Leone	1 – 0	Guinea

November 26, 1991

Sierra Leone	1 – 1	Mali

November 26, 1991

Gambia	0 – 0	Guinea

November 28, 1991

Mali	2 – 0	Guinea

November 28, 1991

Sierra Leone	0 – 0	Gambia

=== Group B ===
Team	Pts	Pld	W	D	L	GF	GA	GD
Senegal	3	2	1	1	0	4	0	+4
Cape Verde	3	2	1	1	0	2	1	+1
Guinea-Bissau	0	2	0	0	2	1	6	–5

November 22, 1991

Cape Verde	2 – 1	Guinea-Bissau

November 24, 1991

Senegal	4 – 0	Guinea-Bissau

November 27, 1991

Senegal	0 – 0	Cape Verde

== Knockout stage ==
=== Semi-finals ===
November 30, 1991

Senegal	2 – 0	Gambia

November 30, 1991

Cape Verde	0 – 0	Sierra Leone

Cape Verde won on penalty shootout.

=== Final ===
December 2, 1991

Senegal	1 – 0	Cape Verde
Mamadou Sarr 89'

Attendance: 25,000
