= 1995 Amílcar Cabral Cup =

Tournament details
- Host country: Mauritania
- Dates: November 17–28
- Teams: 8

Final positions
- Champions: Sierra Leone (2nd title)
- Runners-up: Mauritania
- Third place: Cape Verde

Tournament statistics
- Matches played: 16
- Goals scored: 34 (2.13 per match)

The 1995 Amílcar Cabral Cup was held in Nouakchott, Mauritania.

== Group stage ==
=== Group A ===
| Team | Pts | Pld | W | D | L | GF | GA | GD |
|---|---|---|---|---|---|---|---|---|
| Mauritania | 7 | 3 | 2 | 1 | 0 | 6 | 3 | +3 |
| Cape Verde | 4 | 3 | 1 | 1 | 1 | 2 | 4 | –2 |
| Gambia | 3 | 3 | 1 | 0 | 2 | 4 | 3 | +1 |
| Mali | 3 | 3 | 1 | 0 | 2 | 2 | 4 | –2 |

November 17, 1995

| Cape Verde | 1 – 0 | Mali |

November 17, 1995

| Mauritania | 2 – 1 | Gambia |

November 19, 1995

| Mali | 1 – 0 | Gambia |

November 19, 1995

| Mauritania | 1 – 1 | Cape Verde |

November 21, 1995

| Mauritania | 3 – 1 | Mali |

November 21, 1995

| Gambia | 3 – 0 | Cape Verde |

=== Group B ===
| Team | Pts | Pld | W | D | L | GF | GA | GD |
|---|---|---|---|---|---|---|---|---|
| Sierra Leone | 7 | 3 | 2 | 1 | 0 | 5 | 1 | +4 |
| Guinea-Bissau | 6 | 3 | 2 | 0 | 1 | 5 | 4 | 0 |
| Senegal | 4 | 3 | 1 | 1 | 1 | 5 | 3 | +2 |
| Guinea | 0 | 3 | 0 | 0 | 3 | 1 | 7 | –6 |

November 18, 1995

| Guinea-Bissau | 2 – 1 | Senegal |

November 18, 1995

| Sierra Leone | 2 – 0 | Guinea |

November 20, 1995

| Sierra Leone | 2 – 0 | Guinea-Bissau |

November 20, 1995

| Senegal | 3 – 0 | Guinea |

November 22, 1995

| Guinea-Bissau | 2 – 1 | Guinea |

November 22, 1995

| Senegal | 1 – 1 | Sierra Leone |

== Knockout stage ==
=== Semi-finals ===
November 25, 1995

| Mauritania | 1 – 0 | Guinea-Bissau |

November 25, 1995

| Sierra Leone | 2 – 0 | Cape Verde |

=== Third place match ===
November 27, 1995

| Cape Verde | 1 – 0 | Guinea-Bissau |

=== Final ===
November 28, 1995

| Sierra Leone | 0 – 0 (4 – 3 pen.) | Mauritania |
