= Yaya Dissa =

Malian footballer

Personal information
- Full name: Yaya Mamadou Dissa
- Date of birth: 18 September 1975 (age 51)
- Place of birth: Nioro, Mali
- Height: 1.72 m (5 ft 7 1/2 in)
- Position: Midfielder

Youth career
- 1993–1995: AS Mandé

Senior career*
Years	Team	Apps	(Gls)
1995–1996	Commune IV		
1996–1998	Djoliba		
1998–2001	Al-Shabab		
2001–2002	Athinaikos	24	(7)
2002–2004	Kerkyra	35	(6)
2004	Patraikos	8	(1)
2004–2006	Niort	10	(0)
2006–2009	Niort Saint-Florent		
Total		77	(14)

International career
1995–2001	Mali	42	(9)
- * Club domestic league appearances and goals

Yaya Mamadou Dissa (born 18 September 1975) is a Malian international footballer who last played for Division d'Honneur side Niort Saint-Florent.

== Career ==
Born in Nioro, Dissa began playing youth football for local side AS Mandé. He played as a striker and joined the senior side of AS Commune IV, before moving to Djoliba Athletic Club in 1996. Dissa led Djoliba to the Malian league title in the 1996–97 season, and led the league in goals scored.

His strong performances in the Malian league led to a move to Saudi Premier League side Al-Shabab. At age 26, he moved to Greece where he would play in the Super League Greece for Athinaikos F.C., Kerkyra and Patraikos

Dissa signed a two-year contract with French Championnat National side Chamois Niortais F.C. in 2004.
