= 1988 Amílcar Cabral Cup =

Tournament details
- Host country: Guinea-Bissau
- Dates: April 28–May 8
- Teams: 8
- Venue(s): (in 1 host city)

Final positions
- Champions: Guinea (4th title)
- Runners-up: Mali

Tournament statistics
- Matches played: 16
- Goals scored: 44 (2.75 per match)

The 1988 Amílcar Cabral Cup was held in Bissau, Guinea-Bissau.

== Group stage ==
=== Group A ===
Team	Pts	Pld	W	D	L	GF	GA	GD
Guinea	4	3	1	2	0	3	2	+1
Mali	3	3	1	1	1	5	4	+1
Cape Verde	3	3	1	1	1	5	6	–1
Mauritania	2	3	0	2	1	5	6	–1

April 29, 1988

Mali	3 – 1	Cape Verde

April 29, 1988

Guinea	1 – 1	Mauritania

May 1, 1988

Cape Verde	3 – 2	Mauritania

May 1, 1988

Guinea	1 – 0	Mali

May 3, 1988

Mali	2 – 2	Mauritania

May 3, 1989

Guinea	1 – 1	Cape Verde

=== Group B ===
Team	Pts	Pld	W	D	L	GF	GA	GD
Senegal	4	3	1	2	0	7	3	+4
Sierra Leone	4	3	1	2	0	5	3	+2
Guinea-Bissau	4	3	1	2	0	4	2	+2
Gambia	0	3	0	0	3	2	10	–8

April 28, 1988

Guinea-Bissau	0 – 0	Sierra Leone

April 28, 1988

Senegal	4 – 0	Gambia

April 30, 1988

Sierra Leone	3 – 1	Gambia

April 30, 1988

Senegal	1 – 1	Guinea-Bissau

May 2, 1988

Guinea-Bissau	3 – 1	Gambia

May 2, 1988

Senegal	2 – 2	Sierra Leone

== Knockout stage ==
=== Semi-finals ===
May 5, 1988

Guinea	3 – 0	Sierra Leone

May 5, 1988

Mali	1 – 1 (6 – 5 pen.)	Senegal

=== Third place match ===
May 7, 1988

Senegal	2 – 1	Sierra Leone

=== Final ===
May 8, 1988

Guinea	0 – 0 (3 – 2 pen.)	Mali

Note: There are contradictory reports of this match. According to the RSSSF page for the 1988 tournament, the match ended in 0–0 and Guinea won 4–2 on penalties. On a list of international matches of 1988, the match ended in 0–0 and Guinea won 3–2 on penalties. According to a head-to-head search between Guinea and Mali on FIFA website, Guinea won 3–2 in regular time.
