= 1982 Amílcar Cabral Cup =

Tournament details
- Host country: Cape Verde
- Dates: February 11–19
- Teams: 8
- Venue(s): (in 1 host city)

Final positions
- Champions: Guinea (2nd title)
- Runners-up: Senegal
- Third place: Mali

Tournament statistics
- Matches played: 16
- Goals scored: 33 (2.06 per match)

The 1982 Amílcar Cabral Cup was held in Praia, Cape Verde.

== Group stage ==
=== Group A ===
Team	Pts	Pld	W	D	L	GF	GA	GD
Cape Verde	4	3	2	0	1	4	2	+2
Mali	3	3	1	1	1	5	2	+3
Gambia	3	3	1	1	1	4	4	0
Mauritania	2	3	1	0	2	3	8	–5

Feb 11, 1982

Mali	4 – 0	Mauritania

Feb 11, 1982

Cape Verde	2 – 0	Gambia

Feb 13, 1982

Cape Verde	1 – 0	Mali

Feb 13, 1982

Gambia	3 – 1	Mauritania

Feb 15, 1982

Mali	1 – 1	Gambia

Feb 15, 1982

Mauritania	2 – 1	Cape Verde

=== Group B ===
Team	Pts	Pld	W	D	L	GF	GA	GD
Senegal	5	3	2	1	0	4	1	+3
Guinea	4	3	1	2	0	2	1	+1
Sierra Leone	2	3	1	0	2	2	4	–2
Guinea-Bissau	1	3	0	1	2	1	3	–2

Feb 11, 1982

Senegal	1 – 1	Guinea

Feb 11, 1982

Sierra Leone	2 – 1	Guinea-Bissau

Feb 13, 1982

Guinea	1 – 0	Sierra Leone

Feb 13, 1982

Senegal	1 – 0	Guinea-Bissau

Feb 15, 1982

Guinea	0 – 0	Guinea-Bissau

Feb 15, 1982

Senegal	2 – 0	Sierra Leone

== Knockout stage ==
=== Semi-finals ===
Feb 17, 1982

Senegal	1 – 0	Mali

Feb 17, 1982

Guinea	1 – 0	Cape Verde

=== Third place match ===
Feb 15, 1982

Mali	2 – 1	Cape Verde

=== Final ===
Feb 19, 1982

Guinea	3 – 0	Senegal
