= 1985 Amílcar Cabral Cup =

1985 football tournament

Tournament details
- Host country: Gambia
- Dates: February 11–21
- Teams: 8
- Venue: (in 1 host city)

Final positions
- Champions: Senegal (5th title)
- Runners-up: Gambia
- Third place: Mali

Tournament statistics
- Matches played: 16
- Goals scored: 32 (2 per match)

The 1985 Amílcar Cabral Cup was held in Banjul, Gambia.

== Group stage ==
=== Group A ===
Team	Pts	Pld	W	D	L	GF	GA	GD
Cape Verde	5	3	2	1	0	6	3	+3
Sierra Leone	3	3	1	1	1	3	3	0
Gambia	3	3	1	1	1	3	3	0
Guinea-Bissau	1	3	0	1	2	0	3	–3

Sierra Leone won the 2nd place by a toss of coin.

Feb 11, 1985

Guinea-Bissau	0 – 0	Sierra Leone

Feb 11, 1985

Cape Verde	2 – 1	Gambia

Feb 13, 1985

Sierra Leone	2 – 2	Cape Verde

Feb 13, 1985

Gambia	1 – 0	Guinea-Bissau

Feb 15, 1985

Cape Verde	2 – 0	Guinea-Bissau

Feb 15, 1985

Sierra Leone	1 – 1	Gambia

=== Group B ===
Team	Pts	Pld	W	D	L	GF	GA	GD
Mali	5	3	2	1	0	8	3	+5
Senegal	5	3	2	1	0	6	2	+4
Guinea	2	3	1	0	2	2	5	–3
Mauritania	0	3	0	0	3	0	6	–6

Feb 12, 1985

Senegal	2 – 0	Guinea

Feb 12, 1985

Mali	3 – 0	Mauritania

Feb 14, 1985

Mali	3 – 1	Guinea

Feb 14, 1985

Senegal	2 – 0	Mauritania

Feb 16, 1985

Guinea	1 – 0	Mauritania

Feb 16, 1985

Senegal	2 – 2	Mali

== Knockout stage ==
=== Semi-finals ===
Feb 19, 1985

Senegal	1 – 0	Cape Verde

Feb 19, 1985

Gambia	1 – 0	Mali

=== Third place match ===
Feb 21, 1985

Mali	1 – 0	Cape Verde

=== Final ===
Feb 21, 1985

Senegal	1 – 0	Gambia
