= 1981 Amílcar Cabral Cup =

Tournament details
- Host country: Mali
- Dates: February 2–13
- Teams: 7
- Venue(s): (in 1 host city)

Final positions
- Champions: Guinea (1st title)
- Runners-up: Mali
- Third place: Senegal

Tournament statistics
- Matches played: 14
- Goals scored: 36 (2.57 per match)

The 1981 Amílcar Cabral Cup was held in Bamako, Mali.

== Group stage ==
=== Group A ===
Team	Pts	Pld	W	D	L	GF	GA	GD
Mali	5	3	2	1	0	7	2	+5
Guinea	4	3	1	2	0	4	3	+1
Mauritania	2	3	1	0	2	2	4	–2
Gambia	1	3	0	1	2	2	6	–4

Feb 2, 1981

Guinea	1 – 1	Gambia

Feb 2, 1981

Mali	2 – 0	Mauritania

Feb 4, 1981

Mauritania	(walkover)	Gambia

Walkover. Awarded 1-0 to Mauritania

Feb 4, 1981

Mali	1 – 1	Guinea

Feb 6, 1981

Mali	4 – 1	Gambia

Feb 6, 1981

Guinea	2 – 1	Mauritania

=== Group B ===
Team	Pts	Pld	W	D	L	GF	GA	GD
Senegal	4	2	2	0	0	2	0	+2
Cape Verde	2	2	1	0	1	3	1	+2
Guinea-Bissau	0	2	0	0	2	0	4	–4

Feb 3, 1981

Senegal	1 – 0	Cape Verde

Feb 5, 1981

Senegal	1 – 0	Guinea-Bissau

Feb 7, 1981

Cape Verde	3 – 0	Guinea-Bissau

== Knockout stage ==
=== Semi-finals ===
Feb 9, 1981

Mali	2 – 0	Cape Verde

Feb 10, 1981

Guinea	1 – 0	Senegal

=== Fifth place match ===
Feb 10, 1981

Mauritania	3 – 4	Guinea-Bissau

=== Third place match ===
Feb 12, 1981

Senegal	5 – 1	Cape Verde

=== Final ===
Feb 13, 1981

Guinea	0 – 0 (6 – 5 pen.)	Mali
