= Guinea national football team =

Men's association football team

Guinea
- Nickname(s): Syli National (National Elephants)
- Association: Fédération Guinéenne de Football (FGF)
- Confederation: CAF (Africa)
- Sub-confederation: WAFU (West Africa)
- Head coach: Paulo Duarte
- Captain: Issiaga Sylla
- Most caps: Issiaga Sylla (90)
- Top scorer: Ibrahima Diallo (33)
- Home stadium: Stade du 28 Septembre; Stade Général Lansana Conté
- FIFA code: GUI
First colours	Second colours

FIFA ranking
- Current: 82 ▼1 (7 October 2026)
- Highest: 22 (August 2006, January 2007)
- Lowest: 123 (May 2003)

First international
- Ghana 6–1 Guinea (Ghana; 6 December 1958)

Biggest win
- Guinea 14–0 Mauritania (Guinea; 20 May 1972)

Biggest defeat
- Zaire 6–0 Guinea (Zaire; 2 July 1972)

Africa Cup of Nations
- Appearances: 14 (first in 1970)
- Best result: Runners-up (1976)

African Nations Championship
- Appearances: 3 (first in 2016)
- Best result: Third place (2020)

Amílcar Cabral Cup
- Appearances: 18 (first in 1979)
- Best result: Champions (1981, 1982, 1987, 1988, 2005)

The Guinea national football team (French: Équipe de football de Guinée) represents Guinea in men's international football and is controlled by the Guinean Football Federation. They have never qualified for the FIFA World Cup finals, and their best finish in the Africa Cup of Nations was runners-up in 1976. The team reached the quarter-finals in four recent tournaments (2004, 2006, 2008 and 2015). The team represents both FIFA and Confederation of African Football (CAF).

== History ==
Guinea made their footballing debut in an away friendly on 6 December 1958, losing 6–1 against Ghana. In 1963, Guinea entered its first qualification campaign for an Africa Cup of Nations, the 1963 tournament in Ghana. Drawn in a two-legged qualifier against Nigeria, Guinea drew the first leg 2–2 away on 27 July, and on 6 October won 1–0 at home to win 3–2 on aggregate. They were later disqualified for using Guinean officials in the second leg, and Nigeria went through to the finals in their place. In 1965, Guinea entered the qualifiers for the 1965 African Cup of Nations in Tunisia and was placed in Group A with Senegal and Mali. On 28 February, they lost 2–0 in Senegal before beating them 3–0 at home on 31 March, Senegal's win over Mali allowed them to qualify instead of Guinea.

During the 1976 African Cup of Nations the Guinean team finished second to Morocco, only missing out on the championship by a point.

In 2001, FIFA expelled the country from the qualification process of the 2002 World Cup and 2002 African Cup of Nations due to government interference in football. They returned to international action in September 2002 after a two-year ban from competition. In the 2004 African Cup of Nations, Guinea reached the quarter-finals, scoring the first goal against Mali before ultimately losing 2–1, conceding the winning goal in the last minute of the match. Guinea reached the quarter-final stage again in the 2006 tournament, taking the lead against Senegal before losing 3–2. 2008 saw Guinea reach the quarter-finals of the Africa Cup of Nations for a third successive tournament, only to suffer a 5–0 defeat against Côte d'Ivoire.

In 2012, Guinea beat Botswana 6–1 in the group stage of the 2012 Africa Cup of Nations, becoming the first side to score six goals in an Africa Cup of Nations game since Côte d'Ivoire in 1970. The team subsequently exited the tournament at the group stage after a draw against Ghana.

On 4 January 2016, CAF lifted a ban on Guinea playing their home international in Guinea after it was declared free of Ebola by the U.N. World Health Organization in December 2015.

== Kit provider ==
Kit provider	Period
(Italy) Kappa	2002
(Germany) Adidas	2004
(France) Airness	2014–2016
(Belgium) Sindio	2017
(Italy) Macron	2018–2020
(Netherlands) Masita	2021–2022
(Germany) Puma	2022–present

== Results and fixtures ==
The following is a list of match results in the last 12 months, as well as any future matches that have been scheduled.

Win Draw Loss Fixture

=== 2025 ===
15 November Friendly	Guinea	2–0	Liberia	Mohammedia, Morocco
17:30 UTC+1	Sekou Bangoura; Yadaly Diaby 77'	Report		Stadium: El Bachir Stadium

18 November Friendly	Guinea	1–1	Niger	Berrechid, Morocco
16:30 UTC+1	Baldé 59'	Report	Sako 84'	Stadium: Berrechid Municipal Stadium

=== 2026 ===
27 March Friendly	Togo	2–2	Guinea	Rabat, Morocco
16:00 UTC+1	Denkey 26' (pen.); Metsoko 78' (pen.)	Report	M. Cissé 85'; Guirassy 89'	Stadium: Moulay El Hassan Stadium; Referee: Amir Loussif (Tunisia)

31 March Friendly	Guinea	0–1	Benin	Casablanca, Morocco
21:00 UTC+1		Report	Mounié 33'	Stadium: Larbi Zaouli Stadium; Referee: Haythem Trabelsi (Tunisia)

4 June Friendly	Northern Ireland	1–0	Guinea	La Línea de la Concepción, Spain
18:00 UTC+2	Atcheson 9'	Report		Stadium: Estadio Municipal de La Línea de la Concepción; Attendance: 297; Referee: Seth Galia (Gibraltar)

26 September 2027 AFCON qualification	South Africa	2–1	Guinea	Johannesburg, South Africa
15:00 UTC+2	Okon 30'; Kabini 77'	Report	Cissé 69'	Stadium: Orlando Stadium; Referee: Sadou Ali Brahamou (Niger)

1 October 2027 AFCON qualification	Guinea	1–0	Kenya	Conakry, Guinea
16:00 UTC+0	Guirassy 32'			Stadium: 28 September Stadium; Referee: Mohamed Maarouf (Egypt)

12 November 2027 AFCON qualification	Guinea	v	Eritrea	TBD, Guinea
TBD				Stadium: TBD

15 November 2027 AFCON qualification	Eritrea	v	Guinea	TBD, Eritrea
TBD				Stadium: TBD

=== 2027 ===
24 March 2027 AFCON qualification	Guinea	v	South Africa	TBD, Guinea
TBD				Stadium: TBD

28 March 2027 AFCON qualification	Kenya	v	Guinea	TBD, Kenya
TBD				Stadium: TBD

== Coaching staff ==
Position	Name
Head Coach	(Portugal) Paulo Duarte
Assistant Coach	(Portugal) Tiago Ramos
Team Coordinator	(Guinea) Ousmane Decazi Camara
Technical Director	(Guinea) Lappé Bangoura
Physiotherapist	(Guinea) Abdoulaye Soumaré
Physiotherapist II	(Guinea) Oumarou Sow
Media Officer	(Guinea) Brahima Sy
Security Officer	(Guinea) Idrissa Wagué
Goalkeeping Coach	vacant
Intendant	(Guinea) Alassane Diaw
Team Docter	(Guinea) Mahamadou Coulibaly
Team Docter II	(Guinea) Youssoufou Fofana
Physical Trainer	(Guinea) Sékou Idrissou

=== Coaching history ===
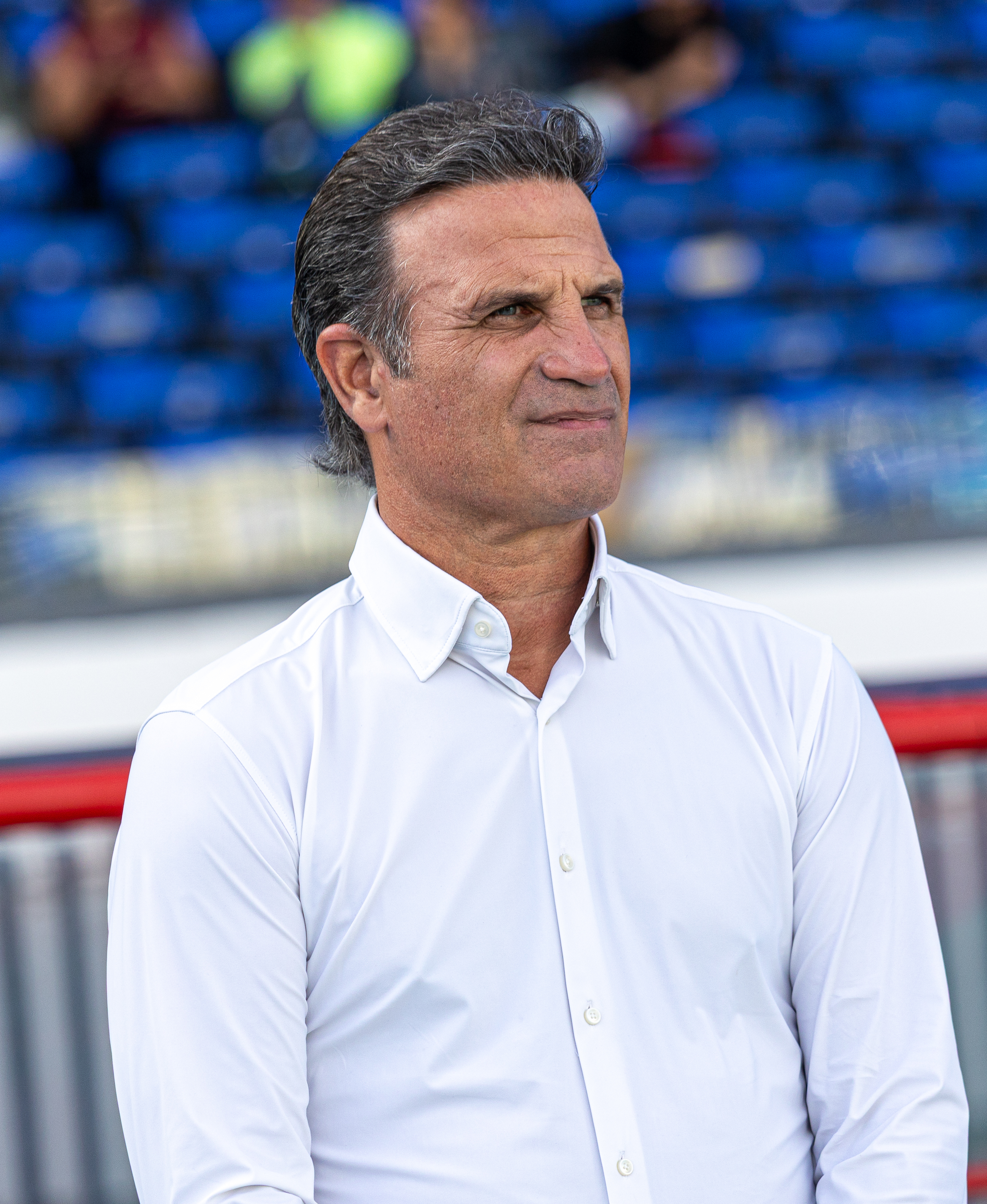
Paulo Duarte has been the manager of Guinea since 2025

- (Romania) Petre Moldoveanu (1975–77)
- (France) Serge Devèze (1992–93)
- (Bosnia and Herzegovina) Boro Primorac (1994)
- (Ukraine) Mykhaylo Fomenko (1994)
- (Ukraine) Volodymyr Muntyan (1995–98)
- (France) Henri Stambouli (1998–99)
- (France) Bruno Metsu (2000)
- (France) Bernard Simondi (2000–01)
- (France) Michel Dussuyer (2002–04)
- (France) Patrice Neveu (2004–06)
- (France) Robert Nouzaret (2006–09)
- (Guinea) Titi Camara (2009)
- (Guinea) Mamadi Souaré (2009–10)
- (France) Michel Dussuyer (2010–15)
- (France) Luis Fernández (2015–16)
- (Guinea) Lappé Bangoura (2016–18)
- (Belgium) Paul Put (2018–19)
- (France) Didier Six (2019–21)
- (Guinea) Kaba Diawara (2021–24)
- (France) Charles Paquille (interim) (2024)
- (France) Michel Dussuyer (2024–25)
- (Portugal) Paulo Duarte (2025–)

== Players ==
=== Current squad ===
The following players were called up for the friendly matches against Northern Ireland on 4 June 2026.

Caps and goals are correct as of 31 March 2026, after the match against Benin.

No.	Pos.	Player	Date of birth (age)	Caps	Goals	Club
	GK	Soumaïla Sylla	15 March 2004 (age 22)	8	0	(French Football Federation) Reims
	GK	Mussa Diallo	1 June 2000 (age 26)	0	0	(Swiss Football Association) Étoile Carouge
	DF	Sekou Sylla	9 January 1999 (age 27)	19	0	(Royal Dutch Football Association) ADO Den Haag
	DF	Mory Konaté	15 November 1993 (age 33)	18	0	(Royal Belgian Football Association) Mechelen
	DF	Mohamed Soumah	15 March 2003 (age 23)	6	0	(Swedish Football Association) IK Sirius
	DF	Ibrahima Breze Fofana	15 August 2002 (age 24)	3	0	(Swedish Football Association) Hammarby IF
	DF	Amadou Cissé	27 February 2006 (age 20)	0	0	(French Football Federation) Strasbourg
	MF	Morlaye Sylla	23 July 1998 (age 28)	43	8	(Saudi Arabian Football Federation) Damac
	MF	Amadou Diawara	17 July 1997 (age 29)	43	0	(Royal Spanish Football Federation) Leganés
	MF	Seydouba Cissé	10 February 2001 (age 25)	27	2	(Royal Spanish Football Federation) Leganés
	MF	Lass Kourouma	30 March 2004 (age 22)	2	0	(Royal Spanish Football Federation) Girona
	MF	Ibrahima Sory Bangoura	5 January 2004 (age 22)	0	0	(Royal Belgian Football Association) Genk
	MF	Ousmane Diabaté	24 September 2007 (age 19)	0	0	(Turkish Football Federation) Gençlerbirliği
	MF	Mohamed Cherif Haidara	21 January 2006 (age 20)	0	0	(Danish Football Association) Sønderjyske
	FW	Ousmane Camara	28 December 1998 (age 27)	9	2	(Chinese Football Association) Guangdong GZ-Power
	FW	Thierno Barry	12 January 2000 (age 26)	9	0	(Cyprus Football Association) Akritas Chlorakas
	FW	Abdoul Karim Traoré	12 January 2007 (age 19)	4	3	(Royal Belgian Football Association) OH Leuven
	FW	Ousmane Camara	3 November 2001 (age 25)	4	0	(Royal Spanish Football Federation) Castellón
	FW	Abdoulaye Camara	21 December 2006 (age 19)	2	1	(Danish Football Association) Vejle
	FW	Mohamed Touré	3 November 2005 (age 21)	2	0	(Football Association of the Czech Republic) Viktoria Plzeň
	FW	Gassimou Sylla	10 August 2008 (age 18)	0	0	(Royal Belgian Football Association) Anderlecht

=== Recent call-ups ===
The following players have been called up for Guinea in the last 12 months.

Pos.	Player	Date of birth (age)	Caps	Goals	Club	Latest call-up
GK	Mohamed Camara	16 March 2000 (age 26)	4	0	(Ghana) Asante Kotoko	v. Northern Ireland, 4 June 2026 ^{WD}
GK	Mory Keita	13 July 2005 (age 21)	1	0	(Guinea) Hafia	v. Northern Ireland, 4 June 2026 ^{WD}
GK	Ousmane Camara	2 January 2000 (age 26)	5	0	(Guinea) Loubha FC	v. Benin, 31 March 2026
DF	Aboubacar Camara	5 January 2001 (age 25)	0	0	(Romania) Metaloglobus București	v. Northern Ireland, 4 June 2026 ^{INJ}
DF	Lancé Camara		0	0	(Guinea) ASM Sangarédi	v. Northern Ireland, 4 June 2026 ^{WD}
DF	Issiaga Sylla	1 January 1994 (age 32)	92	3	(Greece) Asteras Tripolis	v. Benin, 31 March 2026
DF	Saïdou Sow	4 July 2002 (age 24)	30	1	(France) Clermont Foot	v. Benin, 31 March 2026
DF	Ibrahim Diakité	31 August 2003 (age 23)	17	0	(Belgium) Cercle Brugge	v. Benin, 31 March 2026
DF	Mansour Camara	20 August 2007 (age 19)	1	0	(Saudi Arabia) Al-Kholood	v. Benin, 31 March 2026
DF	Julian Jeanvier	31 March 1992 (age 34)	18	0	(United Arab Emirates) Gulf United	v. Niger, 18 November 2025
DF	Dembo Sylla	10 November 2002 (age 24)	15	0	(France) Red Star	v. Niger, 18 November 2025
DF	Madiou Keita	29 August 2004 (age 22)	2	0	(Belgium) RWDM Brussels	v. Niger, 18 November 2025
DF	Sacko Konate	13 October 1998 (age 28)	2	0	(United States) Michigan Stars FC	v. Niger, 18 November 2025
DF	Naby Oularé	6 August 2002 (age 24)	2	0	(Turkey) Vanspor	v. Niger, 18 November 2025
DF	Mohamed Ali Camara	28 August 1997 (age 29)	27	0	(Israel) Maccabi Tel Aviv	v. Liberia, 15 November 2025 ^{INJ}
DF	Antoine Conte	29 January 1994 (age 32)	23	0	(Bulgaria) Botev Plovdiv	v. Liberia, 15 November 2025 ^{INJ}
DF	Sahmkou Camara	10 June 2003 (age 23)	2	0	(Czech Republic) Karviná	v. Liberia, 15 November 2025 ^{INJ}
MF	Sekou Bangoura	25 April 2002 (age 24)	4	1	(United States) Columbus Crew	v. Benin, 31 March 2026
MF	Jocelyn Janneh	6 December 2002 (age 23)	4	0	(France) Bastia	v. Benin, 31 March 2026
MF	Mamady Cissé	1 January 2007 (age 19)	2	0	(Brazil) Atlético Mineiro	v. Benin, 31 March 2026
MF	Ilaix Moriba	19 January 2003 (age 23)	25	1	(Spain) Celta Vigo	v. Togo, 27 March 2026 ^{INJ}
MF	Mohamed Kaba	27 October 2001 (age 25)	0	0	(France) Nantes	v. Togo, 27 March 2026 ^{INJ}
MF	Alhassane Bangoura	12 December 2004 (age 21)	10	0	(Algeria) MC Alger	v. Niger, 18 November 2025
MF	Naby Camara	3 December 2001 (age 24)	2	0	(Tanzania) Simba	v. Niger, 18 November 2025
MF	Aboubacar Bah	30 September 2005 (age 21)	1	0	(Saudi Arabia) Al-Hazem	v. Niger, 18 November 2025
FW	Ousmane Camara	3 November 2001 (age 25)	4	0	(Spain) Castellón	v. Northern Ireland, 4 June 2026 ^{WD}
FW	Yacouba Barry	17 April 1998 (age 28)	17	3	(Guinea) Horoya	v. Northern Ireland, 4 June 2026 ^{WD}
FW	Sory Kaba	10 April 1995 (age 31)	21	3	(United Arab Emirates) Al Dhafra	v. Northern Ireland, 4 June 2026 ^{INJ}
FW	Aliou Baldé	12 December 2002 (age 23)	16	2	(Switzerland) St. Gallen	v. Northern Ireland, 4 June 2026 ^{INJ}
FW	Serhou Guirassy	12 March 1996 (age 30)	28	11	(Germany) Borussia Dortmund	v. Benin, 31 March 2026
FW	Yadaly Diaby	9 August 2000 (age 26)	13	1	(Canada) Vancouver Whitecaps	v. Benin, 31 March 2026
FW	Lamine Diaby-Fadiga	19 January 2001 (age 25)	0	0	(Poland) Raków Częstochowa	v. Togo, 27 March 2026 ^{INJ}
FW	Bachir Bangoura	9 February 2006 (age 20)	8	0	(Sudan) Al Merrikh	v. Niger, 18 November 2025
FW	Ahmad Mendes Moreira	27 June 1995 (age 31)	5	0	(Greece) Kalamata	v. Niger, 18 November 2025
FW	Salifou Soumah	3 October 2003 (age 23)	4	0	(Greece) Panetolikos	v. Niger, 18 November 2025
Notes: ^{DEC} = Player refused to join the team after the call-up.; ^{INJ} = Player withdrew from the squad due to an injury.; ^{PRE} = Preliminary squad.; ^{RET} = Player has retired from international football.; ^{SUS} = Suspended from the national team.; ^{WD} = Player withdrew from the squad for non-injury related reasons.

== Records ==
As of 1 October 2026
Players in bold are still active with Guinea.

=== Most appearances ===
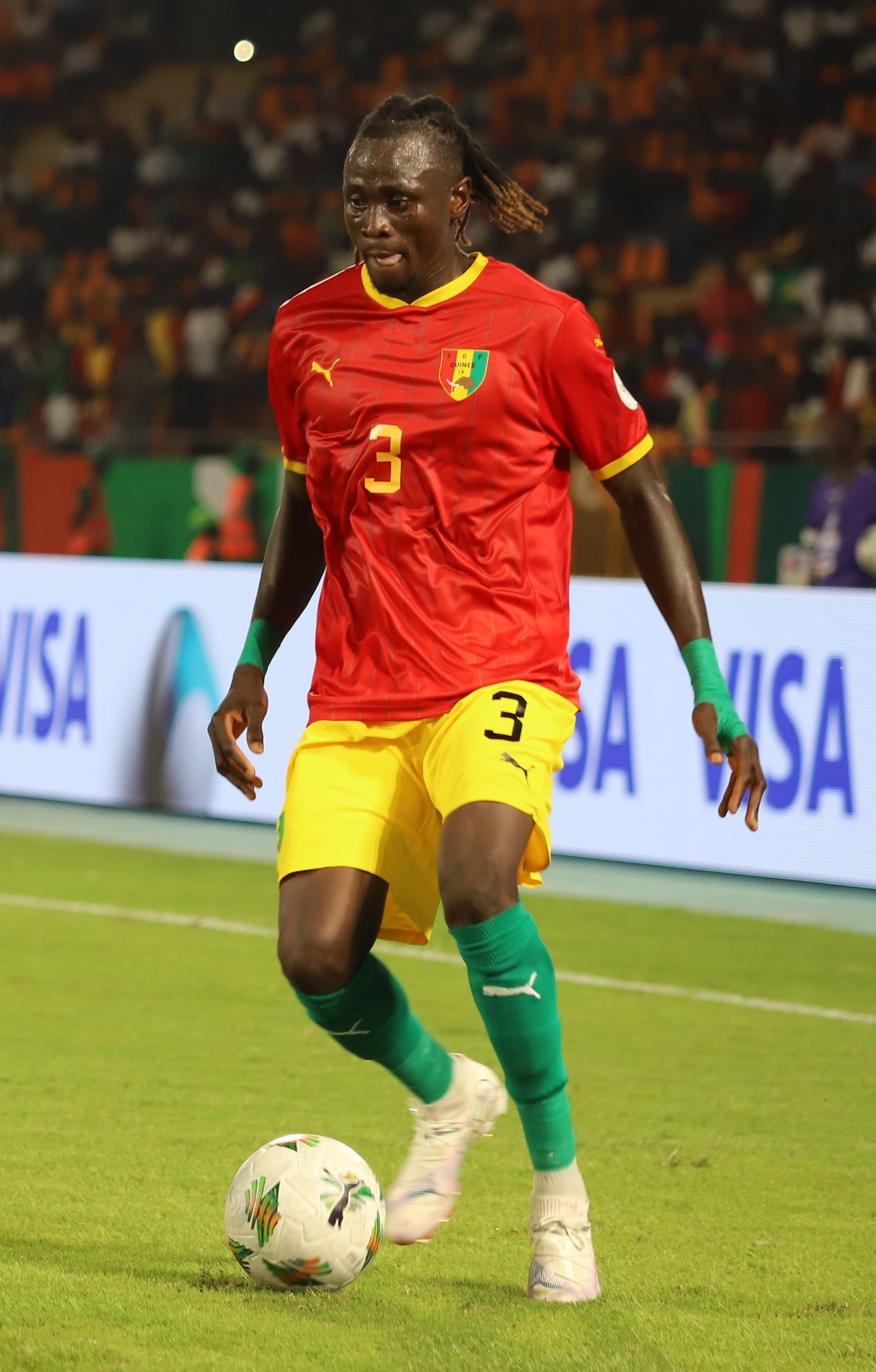
Issiaga Sylla is Guinea's most capped player with 90 appearances.

Rank	Player	Caps	Goals	Career
1	**Issiaga Sylla**	92	3	2011–present
2	Pascal Feindouno	85	30	1998–2012
3	Ousmane N'Gom Camara	73	2	1992–2005
4	Kémoko Camara	71	0	1994–2013
5	Morlaye Soumah	69	2	1988–2004
6	Chérif Souleymane	68	20	1964–1977
7	Dianbobo Baldé	67	2	2000–2012
8	Naby Yattara	61	0	2007–2019
9	Fodé Mansaré	60	8	2002–2010
10	Titi Camara	59	27	1991–2004

=== Top goalscorers ===
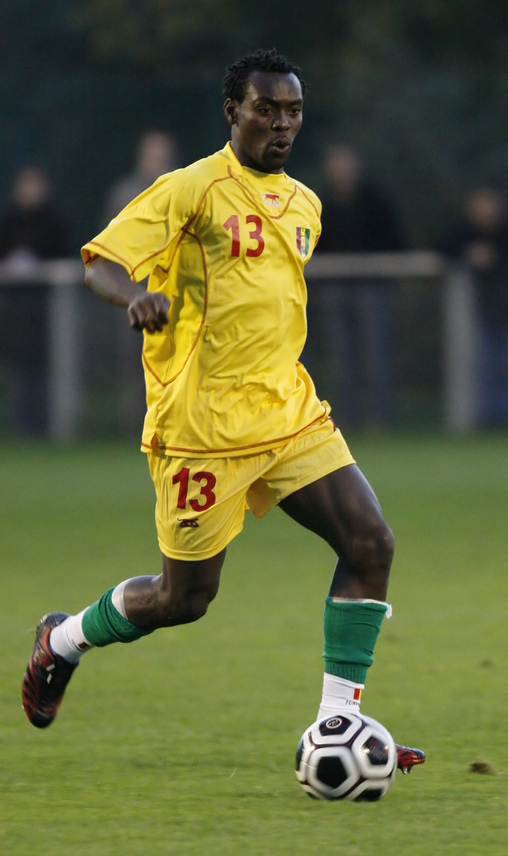
Pascal Feindouno is Guinea's second top goalscorer with 30 goals.

Rank	Player	Goals	Caps	Ratio	Career
1	Ibrahima Kandia Diallo	33	56	0.59	1960–1973
2	Pascal Feindouno	30	85	0.35	1998–2012
3	Titi Camara	27	59	0.46	1991–2004
4	Mamadou Aliou Keïta	22	31	0.71	1970–1981
5	Chérif Souleymane	20	68	0.29	1964–1977
6	Souleymane Youla	19	40	0.48	1999–2009
7	Fodé Camara	14	42	0.33	1988–2002
8	Ismaël Bangoura	13	52	0.25	2006–2015
9	Ibrahima Sory Keita	12	36	0.33	1967–1977
9	Mohamed Yattara	12	38	0.32	2009–2019
9	**Serhou Guirassy**	12	30	0.4	2022-present

== Competitive record ==
=== FIFA World Cup ===
FIFA World Cup record									FIFA World Cup qualification record					
Year	Round	Position	Pld	W	D*	L	GF	GA	Pld	W	D	L	GF	GA
(Uruguay) 1930	Part of France								Part of France					
(Italy) 1934	Part of France								Part of France					
(France) 1938	Part of France								Part of France					
(Brazil) 1950	Part of France								Part of France					
(Switzerland) 1954	Part of France								Part of France					
(Sweden) 1958	Part of France								Part of France					
(Chile) 1962	Did not enter								Declined participation					
(England) 1966	Withdrew								Withdrew					
(Mexico) 1970	Did not enter								Declined participation					
(West Germany) 1974	Did not qualify								4	1	1	2	6	5
(Argentina) 1978	Did not qualify								7	5	0	2	11	7
(Spain) 1982	Did not qualify								6	2	3	1	6	4
(Mexico) 1986	Did not qualify								2	1	0	1	1	2
(Italy) 1990	Did not qualify								2	1	0	1	3	5
(United States) 1994	Did not qualify								6	2	0	4	8	7
(France) 1998	Did not qualify								8	5	0	3	15	9
(South Korea) (Japan) 2002	Disqualified								2	1	1	0	7	4
(Germany) 2006	Did not qualify								12	7	2	3	20	13
(South Africa) 2010	Did not qualify								12	4	2	6	16	19
(Brazil) 2014	Did not qualify								6	3	1	2	12	8
(Russia) 2018	Did not qualify								8	3	0	5	9	14
(Qatar) 2022	Did not qualify								6	0	4	2	5	11
(Canada) (Mexico) (United States) 2026	Did not qualify								10	4	3	3	11	8
(Morocco) (Portugal) (Spain) 2030	To be determined								To be determined					
(Saudi Arabia) 2034	To be determined								To be determined					
Total	—	0/16	–	–	–	–	–	–	91	39	17	35	130	116

=== Africa Cup of Nations ===
Africa Cup of Nations record									Africa Cup of Nations qualification record					
Year	Round	Position	Pld	W	D*	L	GF	GA	Pld	W	D	L	GF	GA
(Sudan) 1957	Part of France								Part of France					
(United Arab Republic) 1959	Not affiliated to CAF								Not affiliated to CAF					
(Ethiopia) 1962	Not affiliated to CAF								Not affiliated to CAF					
(Ghana) 1963	Disqualified								Disqualified					
(Tunisia) 1965	Did not qualify								4	2	0	2	6	6
(Ethiopia) 1968	Did not qualify								4	2	1	1	9	6
(Sudan) 1970	Group stage	6th	3	0	2	1	4	7	4	2	2	0	10	5
(Cameroon) 1972	Did not qualify								4	1	2	1	2	3
(Egypt) 1974	Group stage	5th	3	1	1	1	4	4	2	0	2	0	3	3
(Ethiopia) 1976	Runners-up	2nd	6	3	3	0	11	7	4	3	1	0	11	6
(Ghana) 1978	Did not qualify								4	3	0	1	8	5
(Nigeria) 1980	Group stage	7th	3	0	1	2	3	5	4	2	0	2	8	7
(Libya) 1982	Did not qualify								2	0	2	0	3	3
(Ivory Coast) 1984	Did not qualify								2	0	0	2	0	3
(Egypt) 1986	Did not qualify								2	0	1	1	2	5
(Morocco) 1988	Did not qualify								4	2	1	1	3	5
(Algeria) 1990	Did not qualify								2	0	1	1	1	4
(Senegal) 1992	Did not qualify								6	2	2	2	5	5
(Tunisia) 1994	Group stage	11th	2	0	0	2	1	3	4	1	3	0	5	4
(South Africa) 1996	Did not qualify								10	5	2	3	17	9
(Burkina Faso) 1998	Group stage	9th	3	1	1	1	3	3	3	2	0	1	2	1
(Ghana) (Nigeria) 2000	Did not qualify								4	1	1	2	3	5
(Mali) 2002	Disqualified								Disqualified					
(Tunisia) 2004	Quarter-finals	7th	4	1	2	1	5	5	6	4	0	2	10	3
(Egypt) 2006	Quarter-finals	6th	4	3	0	1	9	4	10	5	2	3	15	10
(Ghana) 2008	Quarter-finals	8th	4	1	1	2	5	10	6	3	2	1	10	3
(Angola) 2010	Did not qualify								6	3	2	1	9	5
(Gabon) (Equatorial Guinea) 2012	Group stage	9th	3	1	1	1	7	3	6	4	2	0	13	5
(South Africa) 2013	Did not qualify								2	1	0	1	1	2
(Equatorial Guinea) 2015	Quarter-finals	8th	4	0	3	1	3	6	6	3	1	2	10	8
(Gabon) 2017	Did not qualify								6	2	2	2	5	5
(Egypt) 2019	Round of 16	16th	4	1	1	2	4	6	6	3	3	0	8	4
(Cameroon) 2021	Round of 16	14th	4	1	1	2	2	3	6	3	2	1	8	5
(Ivory Coast) 2023	Quarter-finals	8th	5	2	1	2	4	6	6	3	1	2	9	7
(Morocco) 2025	Did not qualify								6	3	0	3	9	5
(Kenya) (Tanzania) (Uganda) 2027	To be determined								To be determined					
2029	To be determined								To be determined					
Total	Runners-up	14/35	52	15	18	19	65	72	141	65	38	38	205	147

=== African Nations Championship ===
African Nations Championship record									African Nations Championship qualification record					
Year	Round	Position	Pld	W	D*	L	GF	GA	Pld	W	D	L	GF	GA
(Ivory Coast) 2009	Did not qualify								2	0	2	0	3	3
(Sudan) 2011	Did not qualify								2	0	1	1	1	3
(South Africa) 2014	Did not qualify								4	1	2	1	3	4
(Rwanda) 2016	Fourth place	4th	6	1	4	1	7	7	4	2	1	1	7	5
(Morocco) 2018	Group stage	10th	3	1	0	2	3	5	4	3	1	0	16	4
(Cameroon) 2020	Third place	3rd	6	3	3	0	9	3	2	1	0	1	1	1
(Algeria) 2022	Did not qualify								2	1	0	1	1	1
Total	Third place	3/7	15	5	7	3	19	15	20	8	7	5	32	21

=== African Games ===
African Games record									African Games record					
Year	Round	Position	Pld	W	D*	L	GF	GA	Pld	W	D	L	GF	GA
(Republic of the Congo) 1965	Did not qualify								3	0	3	0	7	7
(Nigeria) 1973	Runners-up	2nd	5	4	0	1	14	7	4	4	0	0	29	5
(Algeria) 1978	Did not qualify								Withdrew					
(Kenya) 1987	Did not qualify								Withdrew					
1991–present	See Guinea national under-23 football team								See Guinea national under-23 football team					
Total	Runners-up	1/4	5	4	0	1	14	7	7	4	3	0	36	12

=== Amílcar Cabral Cup ===
Amílcar Cabral Cup record
Year	Round	Position	Pld	W	D*	L	GF	GA
(Guinea-Bissau) 1979	Third place	3rd	5	1	2	2	8	8
(The Gambia) 1980	Third place	3rd	4	2	1	1	5	3
(Mali) 1981	Champions	1st	5	2	3	0	5	3
(Cape Verde) 1982	Champions	1st	5	3	2	0	6	1
(Mauritania) 1983	Group stage		3	0	1	2	3	7
(Sierra Leone) 1984	Group stage		3	1	1	1	3	3
(The Gambia) 1985	Group stage		3	1	0	2	2	5
(Senegal) 1986	Semi-finals	4th	3	0	1	2	3	5
(Guinea) 1987	Champions	1st	5	3	2	0	3	0
(Guinea-Bissau) 1988	Champions	1st	5	2	3	0	6	2
(Mali) 1989	Runners-up	2nd	4	3	0	1	5	4
(Senegal) 1991	Group stage		3	0	1	2	0	3
(Sierra Leone) 1993	Group stage		2	0	1	1	2	3
(Mauritania) 1995	Group stage		3	0	0	3	1	7
(The Gambia) 1997	Third place	3rd	5	2	2	1	8	4
(Cape Verde) 2000	Third place	3rd	5	3	1	1	8	5
(Mali) 2001	Did not enter							
(Guinea) 2005	Champions	1st	4	2	2	0	4	2
(Guinea-Bissau) 2007	Group stage		3	0	1	2	1	5
Total	Champions	18/19	70	25	24	21	73	70

=== Other records ===
Year	Round	Position	Pld	W	D*	L	GF	GA
(Senegal) 1985 CEDEAO Cup	Third place	3rd	4	0	2	2	3	6
(Saudi Arabia) 2024 FIFA Series	Champions	1st	2	2	0	0	11	1
Total	2 Titles	2/2	6	2	2	2	14	7

== Honours ==
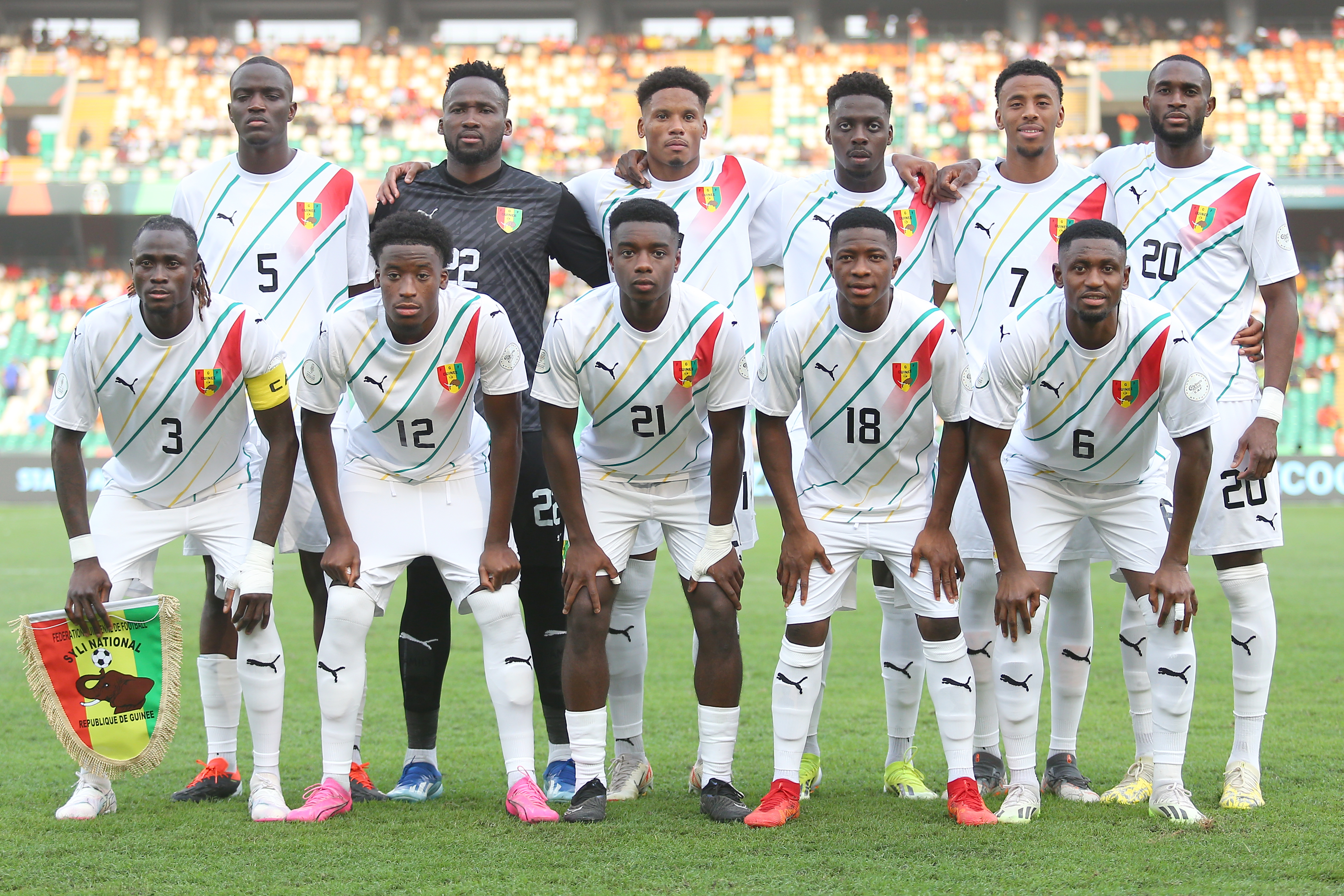
Guinea squad at the 2023 Africa Cup of Nations.

=== Continental ===
- CAF African Cup of Nations
  - Runners-up (1): 1976
- African Games^{1}
  - Silver medal (1): 1973

=== Regional ===
- Amílcar Cabral Cup
  - (gold) Champions (5): 1981, 1982, 1987, 1988, 2005
  - (silver) Runners-up (1): 1989
  - (bronze) Third place (4): 1979, 1980, 1997, 2000
- CEDEAO Cup
  - (bronze) Third place (1): 1985

=== Friendly ===
- FIFA Series (1): 2024 Saudi Arabia B

=== Summary ===
Competition	1st place, gold medalist(s)	2nd place, silver medalist(s)	3rd place, bronze medalist(s)	Total
CAF African Cup of Nations	0	1	0	1
Total	0	1	0	1

Notes

1. Competition organized by ANOCA, officially not recognized by FIFA.
