= Cape Verde national football team results (2000–2019) =

National association football results

This is a list of the Cape Verde national football team results from 2000 to 2019.

== 2000s ==
=== 2000 ===
9 April 2000 2002 FIFA World Cup Q	Cape Verde	0–0	Algeria	Praia, Cape Verde
		Report		Referee: Abdou Diouf (Senegal)

21 April 2000 2002 FIFA World Cup Q	Algeria	2–0	Cape Verde	Algiers, Algeria
	Bourahli 7'; Saïfi 12'	Report		Stadium: Stade 5 Juillet 1962; Referee: Malick Sillah (Gambia)

4 May 2000 2000 Amílcar Cabral Cup	Gambia	1–1	Cape Verde	Praia, Cape Verde
	Jallow 11'	Report	Humberto 16' (pen.)

6 May 2000 2000 Amílcar Cabral Cup	Cape Verde	1–0	Sierra Leone	Praia, Cape Verde
	Zezinho 45'	Report

8 May 2000 2000 Amílcar Cabral Cup	Cape Verde	2–2	Senegal	Praia, Cape Verde
	Humberto 31' (pen.); Toni 45'	Report	? 8' ? 59'

11 May 2000 2000 Amílcar Cabral Cup	Guinea	0–2	Cape Verde	Praia, Cape Verde
		Report	Jair 20'; Toni 58'

14 May 2000 2000 Amílcar Cabral Cup	Cape Verde	1–0	Senegal	Praia, Cape Verde
	Toni 33'	Report

3 July 2000 2002 African Cup of Nations Q	Cape Verde	1–0	Liberia	Praia, Cape Verde
	Toni	Report

5 July 2000 Friendly match	Cape Verde	1–1	Angola	Praia, Cape Verde
		Report

16 July 2000 2002 African Cup of Nations Q	Liberia	3–0	Cape Verde	Paynesville, Liberia
	Weah 3', 77'; Alex Brown 71'	Report

=== 2001 ===
6 April 2001 Friendly match	Mauritania	0–1	Cape Verde	Nouakchott, Mauritania
		Report	Toni 33'	Stadium: Stade Olympique

4 November 2001 2001 Amílcar Cabral Cup	Cape Verde	1–5	Senegal	Bamako, Mali
	Zé di Luisinha 46'	Report	Cissokho 18' (pen.); N'Doye 47'; Diabang 61'; Keita 78'; Diédhiou 84'	Stadium: Stade du 26 Mars

7 November 2001 2001 Amílcar Cabral Cup	Cape Verde	1–1	Gambia	Bamako, Mali
	Marcelino José 45'	Report	Samba 70'	Stadium: Stade du 26 Mars

=== 2002 ===
5 September 2002 2004 Africa Cup of Nations Q	Mauritania	0–2	Cape Verde	Nouakchott, Mauritania
		Report	Lito 45'; Toni 60'	Stadium: Stade Olympique

11 October 2002 2004 Africa Cup of Nations Q	Cape Verde	0–1	Kenya	Praia, Cape Verde
		Report	Baraza 58'	Stadium: Estádio da Várzea

19 November 2002 Friendly match	Luxembourg	0–0	Cape Verde	Hesperange, Luxembourg
		Report		Stadium: Stade Alphonse Theis; Attendance: 2,751; Referee: Damien Ledentu (France)

=== 2003 ===
29 March 2003 2004 Africa Cup of Nations Q	Cape Verde	2 – 1	Togo	Praia, Cape Verde
	Duka 68'; Caló 80'	Report	Wondu 37'	Stadium: Estádio da Várzea

30 May 2003 Friendly match	Senegal	2 – 1	Cape Verde	Dakar, Senegal
	Camara 50'; Diao 62'	Report	Caló 40'	Stadium: Stade Léopold Sédar Senghor

8 June 2003 2004 Africa Cup of Nations Q	Togo	5 – 2	Cape Verde	Lomé, Togo
	Faria 2'; Sherif Touré 23', 32'; Mikimba 72'; Adebayor 78'	Report	Lito 6'; Caló 26'	Stadium: Stade de Kégué

21 June 2003 2004 Africa Cup of Nations Q	Cape Verde	3 – 0 (Abandoned (Note: The match was abandoned at 3–0 in the 85th minute when Mauritania were reduced to six players following 5 red cards. The result stood.))	Mauritania	Praia, Cape Verde
	Lito 65'; Caló 76' (pen.), 82'	Report		Stadium: Estádio da Várzea

4 July 2003 2004 Africa Cup of Nations Q	Kenya	1 – 0	Cape Verde	Nairobi, Kenya
	Oliech 84'	Report		Stadium: Moi International Sports Centre

12 October 2003 2006 FIFA World Cup Q	Swaziland	1 – 1	Cape Verde	Lobamba, Swaziland
	Dlamini 64'	Report	Caló 55'	Stadium: Somhlolo National Stadium; Referee: Berhane Teshome (Eritrea

16 November 2003 2006 FIFA World Cup Q	Cape Verde	3 – 0	Swaziland	Praia, Cape Verde
	Cafú 51', 65'; Caló 90'	Report		Stadium: Estádio da Várzea; Referee: Sharif Aboubacar (Ivory Coast)

=== 2004 ===
5 June 2004 2006 FIFA World Cup Q	South Africa	2–1	Cape Verde	Bloemfontein, South Africa
	Mabizela 40', 68'	Report	Janício 73'	Stadium: Free State Stadium

13 June 2004 Friendly match	Cape Verde	1–3	Senegal	Praia, Cape Verde
	Emerson 68'	Report	Gueye 50'; Kamara 55', 58'	Stadium: Estádio da Várzea

19 June 2004 2006 FIFA World Cup Q	Cape Verde	1–0	Uganda	Praia, Cape Verde
	Cafú 42'	Report		Stadium: Estádio da Várzea

3 July 2004 2006 FIFA World Cup Q	Cape Verde	1–1	DR Congo	Praia, Cape Verde
	Modeste 26'	Report	Kaluyituka 1'	Stadium: Estádio da Várzea

5 September 2004 2006 FIFA World Cup Q	Ghana	2–0	Cape Verde	Kumasi, Ghana
	Essien 24' (pen.); Veiga 62' (o.g.)	Report		Stadium: Kumasi Sports Stadium

9 October 2004 2006 FIFA World Cup Q	Cape Verde	1–0	Burkina Faso	Praia, Cape Verde
	Cafú 2'	Report		Stadium: Estádio da Várzea

=== 2005 ===
26 March 2005 2006 FIFA World Cup Q	Burkina Faso	1–2	Cape Verde	Ouagadougou, Burkina Faso
	Dagano 71'	Report	Caló 48', 87'	Stadium: Stade du 4-Août

4 June 2005 2006 FIFA World Cup Q	Cape Verde	1–2	South Africa	Praia, Cape Verde
	Cafú 77'	Report	McCarthy 10'; Buckley 12'	Stadium: Estádio da Várzea

18 June 2005 2006 FIFA World Cup Q	Uganda	1–0	Cape Verde	Kampala, Uganda
19:00 GMT	Sserunkuma 36'	Report		Stadium: Mandela National Stadium

17 August 2005 Friendly match	Angola	2–1	Cape Verde	Lisbon, Portugal
	Mantorras 46'; Love 86'	Report	Lito 25'

4 September 2005 2006 FIFA World Cup Q	DR Congo	2–1	Cape Verde	Kinshasa, DR Congo
	Kitambala 21'; Mputu 49'	Report	Caló 24'	Stadium: Stade des Martyrs

8 October 2005 2006 FIFA World Cup Q	Cape Verde	0–4	Ghana	Praia, Cape Verde
		Report	Asamoah Frimpong 5'; Muntari 35'; Gyan 75'; Attram 87'	Stadium: Estádio da Várzea

=== 2006 ===
27 May 2006 Friendly match	Portugal	4–1	Cape Verde	Évora, Portugal
	Pauleta 1', 38', 83'; Ronaldo (yellow card) 58'; Petit 60'	Report	Meira 21' (o.g.)	Stadium: Estádio Sanches de Miranda; Attendance: 10,000; Referee: Dick van Egmond (Netherlands)

3 September 2006 2008 African Cup of Nations Q	Gambia	2–0	Cape Verde	Bakau, Gambia
	Ceesay 8' (pen.); Jatta 88'	Report		Stadium: Independence Stadium

7 October 2006 2008 African Cup of Nations Q	Cape Verde	1–0	Guinea	Praia, Cape Verde
19:00 GMT	Lito 52'	Report		Stadium: Estádio da Várzea

=== 2007 ===
24 March 2007 2008 African Cup of Nations Q	Algeria	2–0	Cape Verde	Algiers, Algeria
	Deham 60'; Meniri 89'	Report		Stadium: Stade 5 Juillet 1962

2 June 2007 2008 African Cup of Nations Q	Cape Verde	2–2	Algeria	Praia, Cape Verde
	Soares 65'; Hernâni 90'	Report	Bougherra 33'; Saifi 84'	Stadium: Estádio da Várzea

16 June 2007 2008 African Cup of Nations Q	Cape Verde	0–0	Gambia	Praia, Cape Verde
20:00 GMT		Report		Stadium: Estádio da Várzea; Attendance: 20,000

9 September 2007 2008 African Cup of Nations Q	Guinea	4–0	Cape Verde	Conakry, Guinea
19:00 GMT	Feindouno 19'; Cissé 32'; Camara 39'; Bangoura 45'	Report		Stadium: Stade du 28 Septembre

1 December 2007 2007 Amílcar Cabral Cup	Guinea	0–0	Cape Verde	Bissau, Guinea-Bissau
13:00 GMT		Report		Stadium: Estádio 24 de Setembro

3 December 2007 2007 Amílcar Cabral Cup	Cape Verde	0–0	Gambia	Bissau, Guinea-Bissau
13:00 GMT		Report		Stadium: Estádio 24 de Setembro

5 December 2007 2007 Amílcar Cabral Cup	Cape Verde	1–0	Mali	Bissau, Guinea-Bissau
13:00 GMT	Kadu 10'	Report		Stadium: Estádio 24 de Setembro

7 December 2007 2007 Amílcar Cabral Cup	Guinea-Bissau	1–1 (2–3 p)	Cape Verde	Bissau, Guinea-Bissau
19:00 GMT	Adilson 7'	Report	Babanco 10'	Stadium: Estádio 24 de Setembro
	Penalties

9 December 2007 2007 Amílcar Cabral Cup	Mali	Abandoned	Cape Verde	Bissau, Guinea-Bissau
20:00 GMT		Match was abandoned at 0–0 in 30' due to power failure.		Stadium: Estádio 24 de Setembro

10 December 2007 2007 Amílcar Cabral Cup	Mali	2–1	Cape Verde	Bissau, Guinea-Bissau
20:00 GMT	Coulibaly 4'; Dembélé 24'		Tigana 7'	Stadium: Estádio 24 de Setembro

=== 2008 ===
24 May 2008 Friendly match	Burkina Faso	0–1	Cape Verde	Ouagadougou, Burkina Faso
		Report		Stadium: Stade du 4-Août

27 May 2008 Friendly	Luxembourg	1–1	Cape Verde	Luxembourg City, Luxembourg
	Leweck 77'	Report	Borges 83'	Stadium: Stade Josy Barthel; Attendance: 2,051; Referee: Pavle Radovanović (Montenegro)

=== 2009 ===
25 March 2009 Friendly match	Angola	0–1	Cape Verde	Luanda, Angola
		Report	Dady 33'	Stadium: Estádio 11 de Novembro

28 March 2009 Friendly match	Cape Verde	5–0	Equatorial Guinea	Sal, Cape Verde
	Cadú (x2); Dário; Rodi (x2)	Report		Stadium: Estádio Marcelo Leitão

4 September 2009 Friendly match	Malta	0–2	Cape Verde	Attard, Malta
18:00 GMT		Report	Héldon 15'; Nhambu 40'	Stadium: Ta' Qali Stadium; Referee: Luca Banti (Italy)

9 September 2009 Friendly match	Angola	1–1	Cape Verde	Luanda, Angola
22:30 GMT	Gilberto 22'	Report	Dário 37'	Attendance: 1,500; Referee: Lucílio Batista (Portugal)

== 2010s ==
=== 2010 ===
24 May 2010 Friendly match	Portugal	0–0	Cape Verde	Covilhã, Portugal
12:30 GMT		Report		Stadium: Complexo Desportivo da Covilhã; Attendance: 2,000; Referee: Carlos Clos Gómez (Spain)

11 August 2010 Friendly match	Senegal	1–0	Cape Verde	Dakar, Senegal
18:00 GMT	Héldon 14', 45+1'; Babanco 25'; Fortes 53'	Report		Stadium: Stade Léopold Sédar Senghor

4 September 2010 2012 Africa Cup of Nations Q	Cape Verde	1–0	Mali	Praia, Cape Verde
19:00 GMT	F. Varela 44'	Report		Stadium: Estádio da Várzea; Referee: Mohamed Benouza (Algeria)

10 September 2010 2012 Africa Cup of Nations Q	Zimbabwe	0–0	Cape Verde	Harare, Zimbabwe
21:00 GMT		Report		Stadium: Rufaro Stadium; Referee: Gil Sebastien Ndube (Gabon)

16 November 2010 Friendly match	Cape Verde	2–1	Guinea-Bissau	Lisbon, Portugal
17:00 GMT	Lito 6'; Ronny 26'	Report	T. Varela 26' (o.g.)	Stadium: Estádio do Restelo

=== 2011 ===
9 February 2011 Friendly match	Cape Verde	1–0	Burkina Faso	Óbidos, Portugal
12:30 GMT	Héldon 63'	Report		Stadium: Estádio Municipal de Óbidos

9 February 2011 2012 Africa Cup of Nations Q	Cape Verde	4–2	Liberia	Praia, Cape Verde
18:00 GMT	Héldon 14', 45+1'; Babanco 25'; Fortes 53'	Report	Wleh 38'; Keita 85'	Stadium: Estádio da Várzea; Referee: Lemghaifry Ould Ali (Mauritania)

5 June 2011 2012 Africa Cup of Nations Q	Liberia	1–0	Cape Verde	Monrovia, Liberia
18:00 GMT	Doe 14'	Report		Stadium: Samuel Kanyon Doe Sports Complex; Referee: Lemghaifry Ould Ali (Mauritania)

3 September 2011 2012 Africa Cup of Nations Q	Mali	3–0	Cape Verde	Bamako, Mali
21:00 GMT	Diabaté 28', 30'; Traoré 51'	Report		Stadium: Stade omnisports Modibo Keïta; Referee: Badara Diatta (Senegal)

8 October 2011 2012 Africa Cup of Nations Q	Cape Verde	2–1	Zimbabwe	Praia, Cape Verde
17:00 GMT	Valdo 3'; Mendes 13'	Report	Musona 68' (pen.)	Stadium: Estádio da Várzea

=== 2012 ===
29 February 2012 2013 Africa Cup of Nations Q	Madagascar	0–4	Cape Verde	Antananarivo, Madagascar
12:30 GMT		Report	Mendes 11'; Dady 38'; F. Varela 77'; T. Varela 82'	Stadium: Stade Municipal de Mahamasina

26 May 2012 Friendly match	Angola	Cancelled	Cape Verde	Luanda, Angola
		Report		Stadium: Estádio 11 de Novembro

2 June 2012 2014 FIFA World Cup Q	Sierra Leone	2–1	Cape Verde	Freetown, Sierra Leone
18:30 GMT	M. Kamara 11'; Suma 26'	Report	Soares 90+3'	Stadium: National Stadium; Attendance: 25,000; Referee: William Agbovi (Ghana)

9 June 2012 2014 FIFA World Cup Q	Cape Verde	1–2	Tunisia	Praia, Cape Verde
19:30 GMT	Fortes 26'	Report	Khalifa 14'; Jemâa 46'	Stadium: Estádio da Várzea; Attendance: 3,600; Referee: Redouane Jiyed (Morocco)

16 June 2012 2013 Africa Cup of Nations Q	Cape Verde	3–1	Madagascar	Praia, Cape Verde
19:30 GMT	Mendes 9'; Djaniny 55'; Zé Luís 81'	Report	Voavy 83'	Stadium: Estádio da Várzea

8 September 2012 2013 Africa Cup of Nations Q	Cape Verde	2–0	Cameroon	Praia, Cape Verde
19:00 GMT	Ricardo 15'; Djaniny 61'	Report		Stadium: Estádio da Várzea

14 October 2012 2013 Africa Cup of Nations Q	Cameroon	2–1	Cape Verde	Yaoundé, Cameroon
19:00 GMT	Emaná 22'; Olinga 90+4'	Report	Héldon 12'	Stadium: Stade Ahmadou Ahidjo

14 November 2012 Friendly match	Cape Verde	0–1	Ghana	Lisbon, Portugal
20:00 GMT		Report		Stadium: Estádio Universitário de Lisboa

=== 2013 ===
9 January 2013 Friendly	Cape Verde	0–0	Nigeria	São João da Venda, Portugal
15:00 GMT		Report		Stadium: Estádio do Algarve; Attendance: 300; Referee: Hugo Filipe Ferreira de Campos Moreira Miguel

19 January 2013 2013 Africa Cup of Nations	South Africa	0–0	Cape Verde	Johannesburg, South Africa
11:00 GMT	Ngcongca (yellow card) 44'	Report	Platini (yellow card) 60'	Stadium: Soccer City; Attendance: 50,000; Referee: Djamel Haïmoudi (Algeria)

23 January 2013 2013 Africa Cup of Nations	Morocco	1–1	Cape Verde	Durban, South Africa
13:00 GMT	Achchakir (yellow card) 21'; Belhanda (yellow card) 62'; Barrada (yellow card) 65'; El-Arabi (yellow card) 70' (goal) 79'	Report	Platini 36'; Mendes (yellow card) 38'; Nando (yellow card) 67'	Stadium: Moses Mabhida Stadium; Attendance: 25,000; Referee: Janny Sikazwe (Zambia)

27 January 2013 2013 Africa Cup of Nations	Cape Verde	2–1	Angola	Port Elizabeth, South Africa
12:00 GMT	Héldon (yellow card) 58', (goal) 90+1'; F. Varela 81', (yellow card) 83'; Gêgê (yellow card) 85'	Report	Nando 33' (o.g.); Pirolito (yellow card) 78'	Stadium: Nelson Mandela Bay Stadium; Attendance: 20,000; Referee: Slim Jedidi (Tunisia)

2 February 2013 2013 Africa Cup of Nations	Ghana	2–0	Cape Verde	Port Elizabeth, South Africa
10:00 GMT	Rabiu (yellow card) 27'; Mubarak 54' (pen.), 90+5'; Pantsil (yellow card) 63'; Afful (yellow card) 68'	Report	Babanco (yellow card) 16'; Carlios (yellow card) 53'; Rambé (yellow card) 87'	Stadium: Nelson Mandela Bay Stadium; Attendance: 8,000; Referee: Rajindraparsad Seechurn (Mauritius)

24 March 2013 2014 FIFA World Cup Q	Equatorial Guinea	0–3 (Awarded (Note: FIFA awarded Cape Verde a 3–0 win as a result of Equatorial Guinea fielding the ineligible player Emilio Nsue. The match originally ended 4–3 to Equatorial Guinea.))	Cape Verde	Malabo, Equatorial Guinea
	Doe (yellow card) 34'; Obina (yellow card) 74'; Nsue (yellow card) 78'	Report	Soares (yellow card) 15'; Tavares (yellow card) 45'; Platini (yellow card) 64'; F. Varela (red card) 88'	Stadium: Estadio de Malabo; Attendance: 8,000; Referee: Mahamadou Kéïta (Mali)

8 June 2013 2014 FIFA World Cup Q	Cape Verde	2–1	Equatorial Guinea	Praia, Cape Verde
	Babanco 17'; Djaniny 53'	Report		Stadium: Estádio da Várzea; Attendance: 3,500; Referee: Helder Martins de Carvalho (Angola)

15 June 2013 2014 FIFA World Cup Q	Cape Verde	1–0	Sierra Leone	Praia, Cape Verde
	Héldon 11'	Report		Stadium: Estádio da Várzea; Attendance: 3,500; Referee: Anthony Raphael (Malawi)

14 August 2013 Friendly	Gabon	1–1	Cape Verde	Massamá, Portugal
		Report	Héldon 22'	Stadium: Estádio do Clube Desportivo Real Sport Clube

7 September 2013 2014 FIFA World Cup Q	Tunisia	3–0 (Awarded (Note: FIFA awarded Tunisia a 3–0 win as a result of Cape Verde fielding the player Fernando Varela, who had been suspended in the invalidated match against Equatorial Guinea. The match originally ended 0–2 to Cape Verde.))	Cape Verde	Radès, Tunisia
14:45	Abdennour (yellow card) 78'; Khazri (yellow card) 84'	Report	Platini 28'; Héldon 42'	Stadium: Stade Olympique de Radès; Referee: Bakary Gassama (Gambia)

30 December 2013 Catalonia International Trophy (non FIFA-recognized match)	Catalonia	4–1	Cape Verde	Barcelona, Spain
	García 16', 18'; Bojan 19'; Riera 64'	Report	Djaniny 10'	Stadium: Estadi Olímpic Lluís Companys

=== 2014 ===
5 March 2014 Friendly	Luxembourg	0–0	Cape Verde	Luxembourg City, Luxembourg
		Report		Stadium: Stade Josy Barthel; Attendance: 3,885; Referee: Bart Vertenten (Belgium)

6 September 2014 2015 Africa Cup of Nations Q	Niger	1–3	Cape Verde	Niamey, Niger
	Maâzou 34'	Report	Rodrigues 3'; Fortes 14'; Zé Luís 24'	Stadium: Stade Général Seyni Kountché; Referee: Gehad Grisha (Egypt)

10 September 2014 2015 Africa Cup of Nations Q	Cape Verde	2–1	Zambia	Praia, Cape Verde
17:00	Zé Luís 32'; Mendes 77'	Report		Stadium: Estádio Nacional de Cabo Verde

11 October 2014 2015 Africa Cup of Nations Q	Mozambique	2–0	Cape Verde	Maputo, Mozambique
16:00	Guambe 45'; Reginaldo 66'	Report		Stadium: Estádio da Machava

15 October 2014 2015 Africa Cup of Nations Q	Cape Verde	1–0	Mozambique	Praia, Cape Verde
	Héldon 73'	Report		Stadium: Estádio Nacional de Cabo Verde

14 November 2014 2015 Africa Cup of Nations Q	Cape Verde	3–1	Niger	Praia, Cape Verde
	Lima 68'; Kuca 90'; Héldon 90'	Report	F. Varela 73' (o.g.)	Stadium: Estádio Nacional de Cabo Verde

19 November 2014 2015 Africa Cup of Nations Q	Zambia	1–0	Cape Verde	Lusaka, Zambia
18:00 UTC +2	Kampamba 77'	Report		Stadium: Gabon Disaster Heroes National Stadium; Referee: Bernard Camille (Seychelles)

=== 2015 ===
7 January 2015 Friendly	Cape Verde	1–1	Equatorial Guinea	Seixal, Portugal
	Héldon 18'		Fabiani 90+4'	Stadium: Estádio do Bravo

10 January 2015 Friendly	Cape Verde	3–2	Congo	Dakar, Senegal
16:00	Moubhio 53' (o.g.); Héldon 58'; Kuca 72'		Bifouma 13'; Oniangué 30'	Stadium: Stade Léopold Sédar Senghor

18 January 2015 2015 Africa Cup of Nations	Tunisia	1–1	Cape Verde	Estadio de Ebibeyin, Ebibeyin
20:00	Manser 70'	Report	Héldon 78' (pen.)	Attendance: 7,479; Referee: Eric Otogo-Castane (Gabon)

22 January 2015 2015 Africa Cup of Nations	Cape Verde	0–0	DR Congo	Estadio de Ebibeyin, Ebibeyin
20:00		Report		Attendance: 7,680; Referee: Malang Diedhiou (Senegal)

26 January 2015 2015 Africa Cup of Nations	Cape Verde	0–0	Zambia	Estadio de Ebibeyin, Ebibeyin
19:00		Report		Attendance: 7,950; Referee: Néant Alioum (Cameroon)

31 March 2015 Friendly	Portugal	0–2	Cape Verde	Estoril, Portugal
			Fortes 37'; Gegé 43'	Stadium: Estádio António Coimbra da Mota; Referee: Ovidiu Hațegan (Romania)

13 June 2015 2017 ACON qualification	Cape Verde	7–1	São Tomé and Príncipe	Estádio Nacional de Cabo Verde, Praia
16:00 UTC−1	Djaniny 11', 73'; Rocha 17' (pen.); Rodrigues 35'; Fortes 42'; Babanco 51' (pen.); Tavares 75'	Report	Leal 54'	Referee: Mahmoud Ashour (Egypt)

=== 2017 ===
28 March 2017 Friendly	Luxembourg	0–2	Cape Verde	Hesperange, Luxembourg
20:00 CET		Report	Gegé 8'; Tavares 22'	Stadium: Stade Alphonse Theis; Attendance: 2,096; Referee: Paul McLaughlin (Ireland)

11 June 2017 2019 AFCONQ	Cape Verde	0–1	Uganda	Praia, Cape Verde
16:30 CVT		Report (CAF)	Sserunkuma 83'	Stadium: Estádio Nacional de Cabo Verde; Referee: Ali Lemghaifry (Mauritania)

1 September 2017 2018 World Cup qualifier	Cape Verde	2–1	South Africa	Praia, Cape Verde
17:30 CVT	Rocha 33', 38' (pen.)	Report (FIFA)	Rantie 14'	Stadium: Estádio Nacional de Cabo Verde; Attendance: 4,000; Referee: Mehdi Abid Charef (Algeria)

5 September 2017 2018 World Cup qualifier	South Africa	1–2	Cape Verde	Durban, South Africa
19:00 SAST	Jali 89'	Report (FIFA)	Rodrigues 51', 66'	Stadium: Moses Mabhida Stadium; Attendance: 15,000; Referee: Ferdinand Udoh (Nigeria)

12 September 2017 2017 WAFU Nations Cup 1st round	Benin	2–0	Cape Verde	Cape Coast, Ghana
18:00 GMT	Ogoulola 63'; Osseni 90'	Report		Stadium: Cape Coast Sports Stadium; Referee: Jerry Yekeh (Liberia)

7 October 2017 2018 World Cup qualifier	Cape Verde	0–2	Senegal	Praia, Cape Verde
16:30 CVT		Report (FIFA)	Sakho 82'; N'Doye 90+2'	Stadium: Estádio Nacional de Cabo Verde; Attendance: 14,000; Referee: Gehad Grisha (Egypt)

14 November 2017 2018 World Cup qualifier	Burkina Faso	4–0	Cape Verde	Ouagadougou, Burkina Faso
19:30 GMT	Nakoulma 45', 57', 62'; Diawara 90+3'	Report (FIFA)		Stadium: Stade du 4 Août; Attendance: 7,000; Referee: Youssef Essrayri (Tunisia)

=== 2018 ===
1 June 2018 Friendly	Algeria	2–3	Cape Verde	Algiers, Algeria
22:15 (CET)	Bensebaini 5'; Bounedjah 30'	Report	Gomes 14'; Mendes 67'; Tavares 72'	Stadium: 5 July 1962 Stadium; Referee: Mohamed Marouf (Egypt)

3 June 2018 Friendly	Cape Verde	0–0	Andorra	Almada, Portugal
16:00 (WEST)		Report		Stadium: Estádio Municipal José Martins Vieira; Attendance: 500; Referee: Fábio Veríssimo (Portugal)

9 September 2018 2019 AFCONQ	Lesotho	1–1	Cape Verde	Maseru, Lesotho
15:00 (SAST)	Motebang 75'	Report (CAF)	Djaniny 82'	Stadium: Setsoto Stadium; Referee: Mehdi Abid Charef (Algeria)

12 October 2018 2019 AFCONQ	Cape Verde	3–0	Tanzania	Praia, Cape Verde
16:00 (CVT)	Gomes 16', 23'; Stopira 85'	Report (CAF)		Stadium: Estádio Nacional de Cabo Verde; Referee: Boubou Traoré (Mali)

16 October 2018 2019 AFCONQ	Tanzania	2–0	Cape Verde	Dar es Salaam, Tanzania
17:00 (EAT)	Msuva 29'; Samatta 58'	Report (CAF)		Stadium: National Stadium; Referee: Souleiman Ahmed Djamal (Djibouti)

17 November 2018 2019 AFCONQ	Uganda	1–0	Cape Verde	Kira, Uganda
16:00 (EAT)	Kaddu 77'	Report (CAF)		Stadium: Mandela National Stadium; Referee: Youssef Essrayri (Tunisia)

=== 2019 ===
24 March 2019 2019 AFCONQ	Cape Verde	0–0	Lesotho	Praia, Cape Verde
14:00 CVT		Report (CAF)		Stadium: Estádio Nacional de Cabo Verde; Referee: Mahamadou Keita (Mali)

27 July 2019 2020 CHAN Q	Cape Verde	0–0	Mauritania	Praia, Cape Verde
16:30 CVT		Report (CAF)		Stadium: Estádio Nacional de Cabo Verde; Referee: Bonifacio Julio da Silva (Guinea-Bissau)

3 August 2019 2020 CHAN Q	Mauritania	2–1 (2–1 agg.)	Cape Verde	Nouakchott, Mauritania
17:00 MUT	Touda 2', 68'	Report (CAF)	Papalélé 90'	Stadium: Stade Olympique; Referee: Adissa Abdul Raphiou Ligali (Benin)

10 October 2019 Friendly	Cape Verde	2–1	Togo	Fos-sur-Mer, France
16:00 CEST		Report		Stadium: Stade Parsemain

13 November 2019 2021 AFCONQ	Cameroon	0–0	Cape Verde	Yaoundé, Cameroon
17:00 WAT		Report (CAF)		Stadium: Stade Ahmadou Ahidjo; Referee: Bakary Gassama (Gambia)

18 November 2019 2021 AFCONQ	Cape Verde	2–2	Mozambique	Praia, Cape Verde
15:00 CVT	Rodrigues 6'; Mendes 57'	Report (CAF)	Mexer 18'; Witi 90+2'	Stadium: Estádio Nacional de Cabo Verde; Referee: Joseph Odey Ogabor (Nigeria)
