= 2004 African Cup of Nations qualification =

Football tournament

Qualification for the 2004 African Cup of Nations.

== Qualified teams ==
- Algeria
- Benin
- Burkina Faso
- Cameroon (qualified as holders)
- DR Congo
- Egypt
- Guinea
- Kenya
- Mali
- Morocco
- Nigeria
- Rwanda
- Senegal
- South Africa
- Tunisia (qualified as hosts)
- Zimbabwe

== Qualifying round ==
Of the 52 nations, only Somalia didn't take part, Cameroon qualified as holders and Tunisia qualified as hosts. Furthermore, Djibouti, São Tomé and Príncipe, and Guinea-Bissau withdrew. The remaining 46 teams then ended up being divided into 7 groups of 4 teams and 6 groups of 3 teams, with the 13 group winners and the best runner-up from the groups containing 4 sides, qualifying for the finals. Qualifying took place between 6 September 2002 and 6 July 2003.

=== Group A ===
| Team | Pld | W | D | L | GF | GA | GD | Pts |
|---|---|---|---|---|---|---|---|---|
| Nigeria | 4 | 2 | 2 | 0 | 7 | 3 | +4 | 8 |
| Angola | 4 | 1 | 2 | 1 | 7 | 4 | +3 | 5 |
| Malawi | 4 | 1 | 0 | 3 | 3 | 10 | −7 | 3 |
| Djibouti (W) | 0 | 0 | 0 | 0 | 0 | 0 | 0 | 0 |

(W) Withdrew
8 September 2002

| Angola | 0–0 | Nigeria |

Estádio da Cidadela, Luanda
Attendance: 10,000
Referee: Petros Mathabela (South Africa)

12 October 2002

| Malawi | 1–0 | Angola |
|---|---|---|
| Mwafulirwa 85' |

Civo Stadium, Lilongwe
Attendance: 40,000
Referee: Felix Tangawarima (Zimbabwe)

29 March 2003

| Malawi | 0–1 | Nigeria |
|---|---|---|
| | | Utaka 10' |

Chichiri Stadium, Blantyre
Attendance: 60,000
Referee: Aaron Nkole (Zambia)

7 June 2003

| Nigeria | 4–1 | Malawi |
|---|---|---|
| Yakubu 10', 16'; N. Kanu 22', 35' | | Kanyenda 8' |

National Stadium, Abuja
Referee: Falla Ndoye (Senegal)

21 June 2003

| Nigeria | 2–2 | Angola |
|---|---|---|
| Kalu Uche 57'; Odemwingie 62' (pen.) | | Figueiredo 9'; Akwá 55' |

Samuel Ogbemudia Stadium, Benin City

6 July 2003

| Angola | 5–1 | Malawi |
|---|---|---|
| Msowoya 2'; Akwá 3'; Flávio Amado 33'; Stopirra 76'; Chinho 89' | | Mgangira 78' |

Estádio da Cidadela, Luanda
Attendance: 10,000

=== Group B ===
| Team | Pld | W | D | L | GF | GA | GD | Pts |
|---|---|---|---|---|---|---|---|---|
| Guinea | 6 | 4 | 0 | 2 | 10 | 3 | +7 | 12 |
| Niger | 6 | 3 | 0 | 3 | 5 | 6 | −1 | 9 |
| Ethiopia | 6 | 3 | 0 | 3 | 5 | 7 | −2 | 9 |
| Liberia | 6 | 2 | 0 | 4 | 3 | 7 | −4 | 6 |

7 September 2002

| Niger | 3–1 | Ethiopia |
|---|---|---|
| Tankary 55', 61'; Garba 80' | | Ashenafi 16' |

Stade Général Seyni Kountché, Niamey
Attendance: 35,000
Referee: Lassina Paré (Burkina Faso)
8 September 2002

| Guinea | 3–0 | Liberia |
|---|---|---|
| T. Camara 1'; Mansaré 54'; Conté 69' |

Stade du 28 Septembre, Conakry
Attendance: 35,000
Referee: Samba Diouf (Senegal)

12 October 2002

| Liberia | 1–0 | Niger |
|---|---|---|
| Daye 80' |

Samuel Kanyon Doe Stadium, Monrovia
Attendance: 40,000
13 October 2002

| Ethiopia | 1–0 | Guinea |
|---|---|---|
| Abege 63' |

Addis Ababa Stadium, Addis Ababa
Referee: Maxim Itur (Kenya)

30 March 2003

| Ethiopia | 1–0 | Liberia |
|---|---|---|
| Feleke 80' |

Addis Ababa Stadium, Addis Ababa
Attendance: 40,000
Referee: Ali Mohamed Hassan (Djibouti)
30 March 2003

| Guinea | 2–0 | Niger |
|---|---|---|
| Mansaré 40' (pen.); A. Sylla 90' |

Stade du 28 Septembre, Conakry
Attendance: 25,000
Referee: Montero Duarte (Cape Verde)

7 June 2003

| Niger | 1–0 | Guinea |
|---|---|---|
| Tankari 69' |

Stade Général Seyni Kountché, Niamey
Attendance: 50,000
Referee: Joseph Wellington (Ghana)
8 June 2003

| Liberia | 1–0 | Ethiopia |
|---|---|---|
| Mennoh 57' |

Antoinette Tubman Stadium, Monrovia
Attendance: 14,000
Referee: Aguidissou Crespin (Benin)

21 June 2003

| Liberia | 1–2 | Guinea |
|---|---|---|
| Daye 20' | | Youla 11', 50' |

Accra Sports Stadium, Accra, Ghana (neutral ground)
Referee: Modou Sowe (Gambia)
22 June 2003

| Ethiopia | 2–0 | Niger |
|---|---|---|
| Azad 15' (o.g.); Kidanu 51' |

Addis Ababa Stadium, Addis Ababa
Attendance: 25,000

5 July 2003

| Niger | 1–0 | Liberia |
|---|---|---|
| Alhassan 90' (pen.) |

Stade Général Seyni Kountché, Niamey
6 July 2003

| Guinea | 3–0 | Ethiopia |
|---|---|---|
| Youla 32', 72'; Feindouno 55' |

Stade du 28 Septembre, Conakry

=== Group C ===
| Team | Pld | W | D | L | GF | GA | GD | Pts |
|---|---|---|---|---|---|---|---|---|
| Benin | 6 | 4 | 1 | 1 | 12 | 4 | +8 | 13 |
| Zambia | 6 | 3 | 2 | 1 | 6 | 5 | +1 | 11 |
| Sudan | 6 | 3 | 1 | 2 | 9 | 6 | +3 | 10 |
| Tanzania | 6 | 0 | 0 | 6 | 1 | 13 | −12 | 0 |

8 September 2002

| Benin | 4–0 | Tanzania |
|---|---|---|
| Adjamossi 9', 38'; Tchomogo 75' (pen.); Latoundji 85' |

Stade René Pleven d'Akpakpa, Cotonou
Attendance: 10,000
Referee: Chukwujekwu Chukudi (Nigeria)
8 September 2002

| Sudan | 0–1 | Zambia |
|---|---|---|
| | | Nsofwa 89' |

Al-Merrikh Stadium, Omdurman
Referee: Teshome Berhane (Ethiopia)

12 October 2002

| Tanzania | 1–2 | Sudan |
|---|---|---|
| Rajab 17' | | Richard 27' (pen.), 53' |

CCM Kirumba Stadium, Mwanza
Attendance: 20,000
Referee: Hailemalack Tessema (Ethiopia)
12 October 2002

| Zambia | 1–1 | Benin |
|---|---|---|
| Kilambe 75' | | Oladipupo 45' |

Independence Stadium, Lusaka
Attendance: 30,000
Referee: Walter Mochubela (South Africa)

29 March 2003

| Tanzania | 0–1 | Zambia |
|---|---|---|
| | | Lungu 25' |

National Stadium, Dar es Salaam
Attendance: 23,000
Referee: Tessema Haislemelk (Ethiopia)
29 March 2003

| Sudan | 3–0 | Benin |
|---|---|---|
| Tambal 35', 70'; Kabair 68' |

Al-Hilal Stadium, Omdurman
Attendance: 20,000
Referee: Buenkadil Bisingu Wabelo (DR Congo)

7 June 2003

| Zambia | 2–0 | Tanzania |
|---|---|---|
| Milanzi 44', 81' |

Independence Stadium, Lusaka
Attendance: 30,000
Referee: Youngson Chilinda (Malawi)
8 June 2003

| Benin | 3–0 | Sudan |
|---|---|---|
| Tchomogo 55' (pen.); Ogunbiyi 90' |

Stade de l'Amitié, Cotonou
Referee: Koman Coulibaly (Mali)

21 June 2003

| Zambia | 1–1 | Sudan |
|---|---|---|
| Chalwe 72' | | Dalag 23' |

Independence Stadium, Lusaka
Referee: Hillary Maxim (Kenya)
22 June 2003

| Tanzania | 0–1 | Benin |
|---|---|---|
| | | Kabirou 66' |

National Stadium, Dar es Salaam
Attendance: 20,000

6 July 2003

| Benin | 3–0 | Zambia |
|---|---|---|
| Tchomogo 9', 26'; Latoundji 75' |

Stade de l'Amitié, Cotonou
Attendance: 40,000
Referee: Monteiro Duarté (Cape Verde)
6 July 2003

| Sudan | 3–0 Awarded | Tanzania |
|---|---|---|
| | | Withdrew |

Omdurman

Tanzania pulled out for financial reasons and the game was awarded to Sudan.

=== Group D ===
| Team | Pld | W | D | L | GF | GA | GD | Pts |
|---|---|---|---|---|---|---|---|---|
| Burkina Faso | 6 | 4 | 1 | 1 | 12 | 2 | +10 | 13 |
| Congo | 6 | 2 | 3 | 1 | 5 | 4 | +1 | 9 |
| Mozambique | 6 | 2 | 2 | 2 | 3 | 8 | −5 | 8 |
| Central African Republic | 6 | 0 | 2 | 4 | 3 | 9 | −6 | 2 |

8 September 2002

| Congo | 0–0 | Burkina Faso |

Stade Alphonse Massemba-Débat, Brazzaville
Attendance: 60,000
Referee: Maxime Itur (Kenya)
9 September 2002

| Central African Republic | 1–1 | Mozambique |
|---|---|---|
| Tamboulas 72' | | Fumo 60' |

Barthélemy Boganda Stadium, Bangui
Referee: Felipe Ndong (Equatorial Guinea)

13 October 2002

| Burkina Faso | 2–1 | Central African Republic |
|---|---|---|
| A. Touré 60'; Minoungou 75' | | Oueifio 38' |

Stade du 4 Août, Ouagadougou
Attendance: 25,000
Referee: Zakaria Camara (Guinea)
13 October 2002

| Mozambique | 0–3 | Congo |
|---|---|---|
| | | Tsoumou-Madza 49'; Guié-Mien 70'; Bakouma 73' |

Estádio do Maxaquene, Maputo
Referee: Verson Lwanja (Malawi)

30 March 2003

| Mozambique | 1–0 | Burkina Faso |
|---|---|---|
| Dário 89' |

Estádio da Machava, Maputo
Referee: Nunko Rajanad (Mauritius)
4 May 2003

| Congo | 2–1 | Central African Republic |
|---|---|---|
| Embingou 6'; Ewolo 52' | | Makita 84' |

Stade Alphonse Massemba-Débat, Brazzaville

7 June 2003

| Burkina Faso | 4–0 | Mozambique |
|---|---|---|
| Dagano 6', 8'; A. Touré 34'; Minoungou 88' |

Stade du 4 Août, Ouagadougou
Attendance: 25,000
Referee: Mohamed Ould Lemghambodj (Mauritania)
8 June 2003

| Central African Republic | 0–0 | Congo |

Barthélemy Boganda Stadium, Bangui
Referee: Hissene Ladoual (Chad)

21 June 2003

| Burkina Faso | 3–0 | Congo |
|---|---|---|
| A. Touré 54' (pen.); Ouédraogo 61'; Minoungou 75' |

Stade du 4 Août, Ouagadougou
Attendance: 36,000
Referee: Alex Jules Mana (Nigeria)
22 June 2003

| Mozambique | 1–0 | Central African Republic |
|---|---|---|
| Jossias 73' (pen.) |

Estádio da Machava, Maputo
Attendance: 15,000

6 July 2003

| Central African Republic | 0–3 | Burkina Faso |
|---|---|---|
| | | Dagano 30', 71'; Minoungou 90' |

Barthélemy Boganda Stadium, Bangui
6 July 2003

| Congo | 0–0 | Mozambique |

Stade Alphonse Massemba-Débat, Brazzaville

=== Group E ===
| Team | Pld | W | D | L | GF | GA | GD | Pts |
|---|---|---|---|---|---|---|---|---|
| Kenya | 6 | 4 | 1 | 1 | 9 | 2 | +7 | 13 |
| Togo | 6 | 3 | 1 | 2 | 9 | 7 | +2 | 10 |
| Cape Verde | 6 | 3 | 0 | 3 | 9 | 8 | +1 | 9 |
| Mauritania | 6 | 0 | 2 | 4 | 0 | 10 | −10 | 2 |

6 September 2002

| Mauritania | 0–2 | Cape Verde |
|---|---|---|
| | | Lito 45'; Toni 60' |

Stade Olympique, Nouakchott
Referee: Salih Malick (Gambia)
7 September 2002

| Kenya | 3–0 | Togo |
|---|---|---|
| Baraza 62'; Otieno 68'; Oliech 90' |

Moi International Sports Centre, Nairobi
Attendance: 20,000
Referee: Issack Abdulkader (Tanzania)

12 October 2002

| Cape Verde | 0–1 | Kenya |
|---|---|---|
| | | Baraza 58' |

Estádio Nacional de Cabo Verde, Praia
Referee: Aboubacar Sharaf (Ivory Coast)
12 October 2002

| Togo | 1–0 | Mauritania |
|---|---|---|
| Adebayor 23' |

Stade de Kégué, Lomé
Referee: Idrissa Kaba (Liberia)

29 March 2003

| Kenya | 4–0 | Mauritania |
|---|---|---|
| Mambo 15', 70'; Oyuga 43'; Oliech 43' |

Moi International Sports Centre, Nairobi
Attendance: 30,000
Referee: Teshome Berhane (Eritrea)
29 March 2003

| Cape Verde | 2–1 | Togo |
|---|---|---|
| Duarte 68'; Caló 80' | | Wondu 37' |

Estádio da Várzea, Praia
Referee: Carlos Santos Nandigna (Guinea-Bissau)

6 June 2003

| Mauritania | 0–0 | Kenya |

Stade Olympique, Nouakchott
Referee: Yakouba Keita (Guinea)
8 June 2003

| Togo | 5–2 | Cape Verde |
|---|---|---|
| Faria 2'; Touré 23', 32'; Mikimba 72'; Adebayor 78' | | Lito 6'; Caló 26' |

Stade de Kégué, Lomé
Referee: Lassina Paré (Burkina Faso)

21 June 2003

| Cape Verde | 3–0 Abandoned at 85' | Mauritania |
|---|---|---|
| Lito 65'; Caló 76' (pen.), 82' |

Estádio da Várzea, Praia

The match was abandoned at 3-0 in 85' when Mauritania were reduced to six players following 5 red cards. The result stood.

22 June 2003

| Togo | 2–0 | Kenya |
|---|---|---|
| Faria 23', 57' (pen.) |

Stade de Kégué, Lomé
Referee: Louis Rembengouet (Gabon)

5 July 2003

| Mauritania | 0–0 | Togo |

Stade Olympique, Nouakchott
Attendance: 2,000
Referee: Amadou Ibrahima Diaguiray (Niger)
5 July 2003

| Kenya | 1–0 | Cape Verde |
|---|---|---|
| Oliech 84' |

Kasarani Stadium, Nairobi
Attendance: 35,000

=== Group F ===
| Team | Pld | W | D | L | GF | GA | GD | Pts |
|---|---|---|---|---|---|---|---|---|
| Mali | 6 | 4 | 1 | 1 | 9 | 2 | +7 | 13 |
| Zimbabwe | 6 | 4 | 1 | 1 | 8 | 3 | +5 | 13 |
| Seychelles | 6 | 2 | 0 | 4 | 4 | 10 | −6 | 6 |
| Eritrea | 6 | 1 | 0 | 5 | 1 | 7 | −6 | 3 |

8 September 2002

| Seychelles | 1–0 | Eritrea |
|---|---|---|
| Victor 50' |

Stade Linité, Victoria
Attendance: 3,000
Referee: Benjamina Ravelontsalama (Madagascar)
8 September 2002

| Zimbabwe | 1–0 | Mali |
|---|---|---|
| Muhoni 30' |

National Sports Stadium, Harare
Attendance: 50,000
Referee: Walter Mochubela (South Africa)

12 October 2002

| Eritrea | 0–1 | Zimbabwe |
|---|---|---|
| | | P. Ndlovu 10' |

Cicero Stadium, Asmara
Attendance: 10,000
Referee: Omer Rirache (Djibouti)
13 October 2002

| Mali | 3–0 | Seychelles |
|---|---|---|
| S. Keita 30'; Sidibé 75'; D. Coulibaly 85' |

Stade du 26 Mars, Bamako
Attendance: 50,000
Referee: Denis Sorie (Sierra Leone)

30 March 2003

| Eritrea | 0–2 | Mali |
|---|---|---|
| | | Thiam 54'; D. Coulibaly 89' |

Cicero Stadium, Asmara
Referee: Abdulkadir Omar (Tanzania)
30 March 2003

| Zimbabwe | 3–1 | Seychelles |
|---|---|---|
| P. Ndlovu 19' (pen.), 94' (pen.); A. Ndlovu 90' | | Philip Zialor 91' |

National Sports Stadium, Harare
Attendance: 60,000
Referee: Bernardo Colembi Eugênio (Angola)

7 June 2003

| Seychelles | 2–1 | Zimbabwe |
|---|---|---|
| Baldé 75' (pen.); Zialor 81' | | A. Ndlovu 86' |

Stade Linité, Victoria
Attendance: 12,000
Referee: Langwenya Mangaliso (Swaziland)
7 June 2003

| Mali | 1–0 | Eritrea |
|---|---|---|
| S. Coulibaly 20' |

Stade du 26 Mars, Bamako
Referee: Aboubacar Charaf (Ivory Coast)

21 June 2003

| Eritrea | 1–0 | Seychelles |
|---|---|---|
| Fessehaye 62' |

Cicero Stadium, Asmara
22 June 2003

| Mali | 0–0 | Zimbabwe |

Stade du 26 Mars, Bamako

5 July 2003

| Seychelles | 0–2 | Mali |
|---|---|---|
| | | S. Traoré 60'; B. Touré 85' |

Stade Linité, Victoria
Attendance: 5,000
Referee: Lim Kee Chong (Mauritius)
5 July 2003

| Zimbabwe | 2–0 | Eritrea |
|---|---|---|
| P. Ndlovu 11', 17' (pen.) |

National Sports Stadium, Harare

=== Group G ===
| Team | Pld | W | D | L | GF | GA | GD | Pts |
|---|---|---|---|---|---|---|---|---|
| Morocco | 6 | 5 | 1 | 0 | 10 | 0 | +10 | 16 |
| Sierra Leone | 6 | 3 | 1 | 2 | 7 | 4 | +3 | 10 |
| Gabon | 6 | 2 | 0 | 4 | 7 | 7 | 0 | 6 |
| Equatorial Guinea | 6 | 1 | 0 | 5 | 3 | 16 | −13 | 3 |

7 September 2002

| Gabon | 0–1 | Morocco |
|---|---|---|
| | | Chippo 16' |

Stade Omar Bongo, Libreville
Attendance: 30,000
Referee: Raphaël Evehe Divine (Cameroon)
8 September 2002

| Equatorial Guinea | 1–3 | Sierra Leone |
|---|---|---|
| Mavidi 82' | | Bah 38'; Sesay 46'; Mansaray 68' |

Estadio de Malabo, Malabo
Referee: Lourenço Tavares Neto (São Tomé and Príncipe)

12 October 2002

| Sierra Leone | 2–0 | Gabon |
|---|---|---|
| Kpaka 45'; Bah 46' |

National Stadium, Freetown
Referee: Kouévi Ekoué-Toulan (Togo)
13 October 2002

| Morocco | 5–0 | Equatorial Guinea |
|---|---|---|
| Ramzi 8'; Bidoudane 24'; Safri 27'; Rokki 45'; Kacemi 70' |

Moulay Abdellah Stadium, Rabat
Attendance: 25,000
Referee: Mohsen Boukhtir (Guinea)

29 March 2003

| Sierra Leone | 0–0 | Morocco |

National Stadium, Freetown
Referee: Idrissa Kaba (Liberia)
29 March 2003

| Gabon | 4–0 | Equatorial Guinea |
|---|---|---|
| Mouloungui 8'; Larry 40', 49'; Bito'o 65' (pen.) |

Stade Omar Bongo, Libreville
Referee: Lourenço Tavares Neto (São Tomé and Príncipe)

8 June 2003

| Morocco | 1–0 | Sierra Leone |
|---|---|---|
| Chippo 25' |

Stade Mohammed V, Casablanca
Referee: Abdul El-Fatah Esam Eldeen (Egypt)
8 June 2003

| Equatorial Guinea | 2–1 | Gabon |
|---|---|---|
| Mba 22'; Malango 50' | | Djissikadié 43' |

Stade de la Liberté, Bata
Referee: Buenkadils Bisingu (DR Congo)

20 June 2003

| Morocco | 2–0 | Gabon |
|---|---|---|
| El Yaagoubi 22'; Zairi 75' |

Moulay Abdellah Stadium, Rabat
Attendance: 15,000
Referee: Mohamed Abdelhakim Al-Shelmani (Libya)
22 June 2003

| Sierra Leone | 2–0 | Equatorial Guinea |
|---|---|---|
| Kallon 71'; Kabbah 90' |

National Stadium, Freetown

6 July 2003

| Equatorial Guinea | 0–1 | Morocco |
|---|---|---|
| | | Kharja 60' |

Stade de la Liberté, Bata
6 July 2003

| Gabon | 2–0 | Sierra Leone |
|---|---|---|
| Mbanangoyé 33'; Mintsa |

Stade Omar Bongo, Libreville

=== Group H ===
| Team | Pld | W | D | L | GF | GA | GD | Pts |
|---|---|---|---|---|---|---|---|---|
| Senegal | 4 | 3 | 1 | 0 | 7 | 1 | +6 | 10 |
| Gambia | 4 | 1 | 1 | 2 | 7 | 4 | +3 | 4 |
| Lesotho | 4 | 1 | 0 | 3 | 1 | 10 | −9 | 3 |
| São Tomé and Príncipe (W) | 0 | 0 | 0 | 0 | 0 | 0 | 0 | 0 |

(W) Withdrew
8 September 2002

| Lesotho | 0–1 | Senegal |
|---|---|---|
| | | H. Camara 35' |

Setsoto Stadium, Maseru
Attendance: 30,000
Referee: Langwenja Mangaliso (Swaziland)

13 October 2002

| Gambia | 6–0 | Lesotho |
|---|---|---|
| Nyang 7', 40'; Sarr 45'; J. Ceesay 55', 88'; Soley |

Independence Stadium, Bakau
Attendance: 25,000
Referee: Seydou Ba (Mauritania)

30 March 2003

| Gambia | 0–0 | Senegal |

Independence Stadium, Bakau
Attendance: 30,000
Referee: Amadou Ibrahim Djingarey (Niger)

7 June 2003

| Senegal | 3–1 | Gambia |
|---|---|---|
| Diatta 8'; H. Camara 36'; Diouf 73' | | Sillah 63' |

Stade Léopold Sédar Senghor, Dakar
Referee: Hichem Guirat (Tunisia)

14 June 2003

| Senegal | 3–0 | Lesotho |
|---|---|---|
| Diouf 26' (pen.); H. Camara 66', 70' |

Stade Léopold Sédar Senghor, Dakar

6 July 2003

| Lesotho | 1–0 | Gambia |
|---|---|---|
| Makhele 87' |

Setsoto Stadium, Maseru
Attendance: 10,000

=== Group I ===
| Team | Pld | W | D | L | GF | GA | GD | Pts |
|---|---|---|---|---|---|---|---|---|
| DR Congo | 6 | 3 | 2 | 1 | 9 | 5 | +4 | 11 |
| Libya | 6 | 3 | 1 | 2 | 12 | 8 | +4 | 10 |
| Swaziland | 6 | 2 | 2 | 2 | 8 | 12 | −4 | 8 |
| Botswana | 6 | 0 | 3 | 3 | 2 | 6 | −4 | 3 |

7 September 2002

| Botswana | 0–0 | Swaziland |

Botswana National Stadium, Gaborone
Referee: Samuel Moeketsi (Lesotho)
8 September 2002

| Libya | 3–2 | DR Congo |
|---|---|---|
| Al-Malyan 16'; Muntasser 36'; Essam Bilal 41' (pen.) | | Nonda 22'; Marlin Piana 52' |

Misurata Stadium, Misurata
Referee: Mohammed El Arjoun (Morocco)

13 October 2002

| DR Congo | 2–0 | Botswana |
|---|---|---|
| LuaLua 6'; Piana 21' |

Stade des Martyrs, Kinshasa
Attendance: 100,000
Referee: Joseph Mandzioukouta (Congo)
13 October 2002

| Swaziland | 2–1 | Libya |
|---|---|---|
| Gamedze 81'; Nhleko 83' | | Salah 20' (pen.) |

Somhlolo National Stadium, Lobamba
Referee: Bernardo Colembi (Angola)

30 March 2003

| Libya | 0–0 | Botswana |

March 28 Stadium, Benghazi
Referee: Pare Passina (Burkina Faso)
30 March 2003

| Swaziland | 1–1 | DR Congo |
|---|---|---|
| Dlamini 10' | | Musasa 65' |

Somhlolo National Stadium, Lobamba
Referee: Mathew Katjimune (Namibia)

7 June 2003

| Botswana | 0–1 | Libya |
|---|---|---|
| | | Al Masli 89' |

Botswana National Stadium, Gaborone
Referee: Nunkoo Rajanand (Mauritius)
8 June 2003

| DR Congo | 2–0 | Swaziland |
|---|---|---|
| Piana 18'; Musasa 71' |

Stade des Martyrs, Kinshasa
Attendance: 60,000
Referee: Benjamin Ravelotslam (Mauritius)

22 June 2003

| DR Congo | 2–1 | Libya |
|---|---|---|
| Masudi 29'; Piana 83' | | Ilid Hamid 49' |

Stade des Martyrs, Kinshasa
22 June 2003

| Swaziland | 3–2 | Botswana |
|---|---|---|
| Siza Dlamini 7', 25'; Sibusiso Dlamini 18' | | Mogaladi 41'; Kolagano 56' |

Somhlolo National Stadium, Lobamba
Attendance: 10,000

5 July 2003

| Libya | 6–2 | Swaziland |
|---|---|---|
| El Taib; Al-Mirghani; Al-Tarhouni (pen.); Al-Milyan; Saad (pen.) | | Bongali Dlamini |

June 11 Stadium, Tripoli
5 July 2003

| Botswana | 0–0 | DR Congo |

Botswana National Stadium, Gaborone

=== Group J ===
| Team | Pld | W | D | L | GF | GA | GD | Pts |
|---|---|---|---|---|---|---|---|---|
| Egypt | 4 | 3 | 0 | 1 | 14 | 1 | +13 | 9 |
| Madagascar | 4 | 2 | 0 | 2 | 2 | 8 | −6 | 6 |
| Mauritius | 4 | 1 | 0 | 3 | 2 | 9 | −7 | 3 |
| Guinea-Bissau (W) | 0 | 0 | 0 | 0 | 0 | 0 | 0 | 0 |

(W) Withdrew
7 September 2002

| Madagascar | 1–0 | Egypt |
|---|---|---|
| Menahely 73' |

Mahamasina Municipal Stadium, Antananarivo
Referee: Aaron Dkole (Zambia)

12 October 2002

| Mauritius | 0–1 | Madagascar |
|---|---|---|
| | | Menahely 26' |

Stade Auguste Vollaire, Centre de Flacq
Attendance: 1,819
Referee: Eddy Maillet (Seychelles)

29 March 2003

| Mauritius | 0–1 | Egypt |
|---|---|---|
| | | Mido 43' |

Rose Hill Stadium, Beau Bassin-Rose Hill
Attendance: 800
Referee: Jelas Masole (Botswana)

8 June 2003

| Egypt | 7–0 | Mauritius |
|---|---|---|
| Mido 7' (pen.), 22'; El-Sayed 18'; Hamza 53'; Emam 61'; A. Hassan 72', 89' |

Port Said Stadium, Port Said
Attendance: 20,000
Referee: Mohamed Abdalla (Libya)

20 June 2003

| Egypt | 6–0 | Madagascar |
|---|---|---|
| El-Tabei 1'; Belal 9', 24', 56', 83'; Mido 41' |

Port Said Stadium, Port Said

6 July 2003

| Madagascar | 0–2 | Mauritius |
|---|---|---|
| | | Perle 16'; Appou 31' (pen.) |

Mahamasina Municipal Stadium, Antananarivo

=== Group K ===
| Team | Pld | W | D | L | GF | GA | GD | Pts |
|---|---|---|---|---|---|---|---|---|
| South Africa | 4 | 3 | 1 | 0 | 6 | 1 | +5 | 10 |
| Ivory Coast | 4 | 2 | 1 | 1 | 8 | 3 | +5 | 7 |
| Burundi | 4 | 0 | 0 | 4 | 1 | 11 | −10 | 0 |

8 September 2002

| Ivory Coast | 0–0 | South Africa |

Stade Félix Houphouët-Boigny, Abidjan
Attendance: 30,000
Referee: Coulibaly Koman (Mali)

13 October 2002

| South Africa | 2–0 | Burundi |
|---|---|---|
| Mayo 13'; Buckley 39' |

Vodacom Park, Bloemfontein
Attendance: 30,000
Referee: Abdoul Madarbocus (Mauritius)

30 March 2003

| Burundi | 0–1 | Ivory Coast |
|---|---|---|
| | | Bakari 11' |

Prince Louis Rwagasore Stadium, Bujumbura
Referee: Michel Gasingwa (Rwanda)

8 June 2003

| Ivory Coast | 6–1 | Burundi |
|---|---|---|
| Drogba 7', 27', 32'; Bakari 56', 78'; Dindane 70' | | Shabani 88' |

Stade Félix Houphouët-Boigny, Abidjan
Attendance: 50,000
Referee: Manuel Monteiro Duarte (Cape Verde)

22 June 2003

| South Africa | 2–1 | Ivory Coast |
|---|---|---|
| Bartlett 21'; Nomvete 65' | | Kalou 41' |

Peter Mokaba Stadium, Pietersburg
Attendance: 35,000
Referee: Eddy Maillet (Seychelles)

6 July 2003

| Burundi | 0–2 | South Africa |
|---|---|---|
| | | Mokoena 1'; Fredericks 30' |

Prince Louis Rwagasore Stadium, Bujumbura
Attendance: 8,000
Referee: Berhane Teshome (Ethiopia)

=== Group L ===
| Team | Pld | W | D | L | GF | GA | GD | Pts |
|---|---|---|---|---|---|---|---|---|
| Algeria | 4 | 3 | 1 | 0 | 6 | 1 | +5 | 10 |
| Chad | 4 | 1 | 1 | 2 | 4 | 6 | −2 | 4 |
| Namibia | 4 | 1 | 0 | 3 | 2 | 5 | −3 | 3 |

7 September 2002

| Namibia | 0–1 | Algeria |
|---|---|---|
| | | Benjamin 5' (o.g.) |

Independence Stadium, Windhoek
Attendance: 13,000
Referee: Felix Tangawarima (Zimbabwe)

11 October 2002

| Algeria | 4–1 | Chad |
|---|---|---|
| Akrour 26', 72' (pen.); Belmadi 54', 69' |

Stade 19 Mai 1956, Annaba
Attendance: 20,000
Referee: Ahmed Redha El Batadji (Egypt)

30 March 2003

| Chad | 2–0 | Namibia |
|---|---|---|
| Hisseine 57', 90' |

Stade Nacional, N'Djamena
Referee: Maurice Dimanche (Central African Republic)

7 June 2003

| Namibia | 2–1 | Chad |
|---|---|---|
| Dieergaardt 24'; Hummel 76' (pen.) | | Hissein 35' |

Independence Stadium, Windhoek
Attendance: 5,000
Referee: Eugênio Bernardo Colembi (Angola)

20 June 2003

| Algeria | 1–0 | Namibia |
|---|---|---|
| Kraouche 5' |

Stade Mustapha Tchaker, Blida
Attendance: 30,000
Referee: Ahmed Auda (Egypt)

6 July 2003

| Chad | 0–0 | Algeria |

Stade Nacional, N'Djamena

=== Group M ===
| Team | Pld | W | D | L | GF | GA | GD | Pts |
|---|---|---|---|---|---|---|---|---|
| Rwanda | 4 | 2 | 1 | 1 | 4 | 4 | 0 | 7 |
| Uganda | 4 | 1 | 2 | 1 | 2 | 2 | 0 | 5 |
| Ghana | 4 | 1 | 1 | 2 | 5 | 5 | 0 | 4 |

7 September 2002

| Uganda | 1–0 | Ghana |
|---|---|---|
| Obwiny 52' |

Nakivubo Stadium, Kampala
Attendance: 25,000
Referee: Hassan Mohamed (Somalia)

13 October 2002

| Ghana | 4–2 | Rwanda |
|---|---|---|
| Ntaganda 24' (o.g.); Mohammed 42'; Asampong 58'; Boateng 70' (pen.) | | Milly 16'; Ndikumana 43' (pen.) |

Accra Sports Stadium, Accra
Attendance: 40,000
Referee: Pare Lassina (Burkina Faso)

29 March 2003

| Rwanda | 0–0 | Uganda |

Amahoro Stadium, Kigali
Referee: Mohamed Bakhit (Sudan)

7 June 2003

| Uganda | 0–1 | Rwanda |
|---|---|---|
| | | Gatete 40' |

Nakivubo Stadium, Kampala
Attendance: 50,000
Referee: Alemu Gizate (Ethiopia)

22 June 2003

| Ghana | 1–1 | Uganda |
|---|---|---|
| Amoah 84' | | Bajope 16' |

Kumasi Sports Stadium, Kumasi

6 July 2003

| Rwanda | 1–0 | Ghana |
|---|---|---|
| Gatete 49' |

Amahoro Stadium, Kigali
Attendance: 40,000

== Best runner-up ==
The best runner-up from groups with four teams would qualify for the finals.

| Team | Pld | W | D | L | GF | GA | GD | Pts |
|---|---|---|---|---|---|---|---|---|
| Zimbabwe | 6 | 4 | 1 | 1 | 9 | 2 | +7 | 13 |
| Zambia | 6 | 3 | 2 | 1 | 6 | 5 | +1 | 11 |
| Libya | 6 | 3 | 1 | 2 | 12 | 8 | +4 | 10 |
| Sierra Leone | 6 | 3 | 1 | 2 | 7 | 4 | +3 | 10 |
| Togo | 6 | 3 | 1 | 2 | 9 | 7 | +2 | 10 |
| Congo | 6 | 2 | 3 | 1 | 5 | 4 | +1 | 9 |
| Niger | 6 | 3 | 0 | 3 | 5 | 6 | −1 | 9 |
