= 2017 WAFU Cup of Nations =

Tournament details
- Host country: Ghana
- Dates: 9–24 September 2017
- Teams: 16 (from 1 sub-confederation)
- Venues: 2 (in 2 host cities)

Final positions
- Champions: Ghana (2nd title)
- Runners-up: Nigeria
- Third place: Niger
- Fourth place: Benin

Tournament statistics
- Matches played: 24
- Goals scored: 44 (1.83 per match)
- Top scorer(s): (Ghana) Stephen Sarfo (Niger) Victorien Adebayor (3 goals each)
- Best player: (Ghana) Isaac Twum
- Best goalkeeper: (Nigeria) Ikechukwu Ezenwa

The 2017 WAFU Cup of Nations (also referred to as Ghana 2017) was an association football tournament that took place in September 2017 in Ghana.

Sixteen teams from West Africa participated. The tournament was the first featuring national teams to be arranged by Fox Sports as part of a twelve year partnership between the broadcaster and the West Africa national football associations union.

Originally, one of the two host cities was set to be Sekondi-Takoradi however the local organising committee changed it to Elmina due to "structural defects at the Sekondi-Takoradi Stadium and the danger it could pose to fans during the tournament".

== Participants ==
WAFU Zone A

- Cape Verde
- Gambia
- Guinea
- Guinea-Bissau
- Mali
- Mauritania
- Senegal
- Sierra Leone

WAFU Zone B

- Benin
- Burkina Faso
- Ghana
- Ivory Coast
- Liberia
- Niger
- Nigeria
- Togo

== Draw ==
The draw was held on 27 July at Labadi Beach Hotel in Accra. Teams were ranked using the June 2017 FIFA Rankings. Ghana were given the highest ranking due to being competition hosts.

Nation	Ranking
Ghana	49
Senegal	27
Nigeria	38
Burkina Faso	41
Ivory Coast	47
Mali	66
Guinea	72
Benin	81
Cape Verde	84
Guinea-Bissau	103
Mauritania	104
Togo	112
Sierra Leone	113
Niger	130
Liberia	151
Gambia	164

The four highest ranked national teams from WAFU Zones A and B were seeded meaning they could not be drawn against each other.

== Matches ==
- All times listed are GMT.

=== First round ===
==== Zone A ====
9 September 2017
15:00

Ghana	1–0	Gambia
Antigah 90+9' (pen.)	Report

Cape Coast Sports Stadium, Cape Coast
Referee: Boukari Ouedraogo (Burkina Faso)

10 September 2017
18:00

Guinea	2–1	Guinea-Bissau
Keita 32' (pen.); Camara 40'	Report	Correia 15'

Cape Coast Sports Stadium, Cape Coast
Referee: Kouassi Fredéric Biro (Ivory Coast)

11 September 2017
15:00

Mali	3–1	Mauritania
Konte 30'; Kone 88', 91'	Report	Cheikh 36'

Cape Coast Sports Stadium, Cape Coast
Referee: Daouda Gueye (Senegal)

11 September 2017
18:00

Nigeria	2–0	Sierra Leone
Okoro 85'; Moses 87'	Report

Cape Coast Sports Stadium, Cape Coast
Referee: Yanissou Bebou (Togo)

==== Zone B ====
9 September 2017
18:00

Senegal	0–0	Liberia
	Report
Penalties
	5–4

Cape Coast Sports Stadium, Cape Coast
Referee: Baba Léno (Guinea)

10 September 2017
15:00

Burkina Faso	1–2	Niger
Dah 59'	Report	Soumana 34'; Halidou 71'

Cape Coast Sports Stadium, Cape Coast
Referee: Daniel Laryea (Ghana)

12 September 2017
15:00

Ivory Coast	0–0	Togo
	Report
Penalties
	4–3

Cape Coast Sports Stadium, Cape Coast
Referee: Baba Léno (Guinea)

12 September 2017
18:00

Benin	2–0	Cape Verde
Ogoulola 63'; Osseni 90'	Report

Cape Coast Sports Stadium, Cape Coast
Referee: Jerry Yekeh (Liberia)

=== Second round ===
==== Group 1 ====
Pos	Team	Pld	W	D	L	GF	GA	GD	Pts	Qualification
1	Ghana (H)	3	2	0	1	3	2	+1	6	Advance to semi-finals
2	Nigeria	3	1	2	0	2	0	+2	5	Advance to semi-finals
3	Mali	3	0	2	1	1	2	−1	2	
4	Guinea	3	0	2	1	1	3	−2	2	

Source: WAFU
(H) Hosts
14 September 2017
15:00

Mali	0–0	Nigeria
	Report

Cape Coast Sports Stadium, Cape Coast
Referee: Kouassi Fredéric Biro (Ivory Coast)
14 September 2017
18:00

Ghana	2–0	Guinea
Sa. Sarfo 48'; Kizito 77'	Report

Cape Coast Sports Stadium, Cape Coast
Referee: Yanissou Bebou (Togo)

16 September 2017
15:00

Guinea	0–0	Nigeria
	Report

Cape Coast Sports Stadium, Cape Coast
Referee: Daouda Gueye (Senegal)
16 September 2017
18:00

Ghana	1–0	Mali
Cobbinah 73'	Report

Cape Coast Sports Stadium, Cape Coast
Referee: Jerry Yekeh (Liberia)

18 September 2017
18:00

Guinea	1–1	Mali
Camara 7'	Report	Camara 78' (o.g.)

Nduom Sports Stadium, Elmina
Referee: Boukari Ouedraogo (Burkina Faso)
18 September 2017
18:00

Ghana	0–2	Nigeria
	Report	Okpotu 52'; Eneji 55'

Cape Coast Sports Stadium, Cape Coast
Referee: Kouassi Fredéric Biro (Ivory Coast)

==== Group 2 ====
Pos	Team	Pld	W	D	L	GF	GA	GD	Pts	Qualification
1	Benin	3	2	0	1	3	5	−2	6	Advance to semi-finals
2	Niger	3	1	1	1	3	3	0	4	Advance to semi-finals
3	Senegal	3	1	1	1	5	2	+3	4	
4	Ivory Coast	3	0	2	1	0	1	−1	2	

Source: WAFU
15 September 2017
15:00 GMT

Senegal	1–2	Niger
Mbodj 61'	Report	Adebayor 29'; Issoufou 88'

Cape Coast Sports Stadium, Cape Coast
Referee: Boukari Ouedraogo (Burkina Faso)
15 September 2017
18:00 GMT

Ivory Coast	0–1	Benin
	Report	Gomez 40'

Cape Coast Sports Stadium, Cape Coast
Referee: Daniel Laryea (Ghana)

17 September 2017
15:00

Niger	0–0	Ivory Coast
	Report

Cape Coast Sports Stadium, Cape Coast
Referee: Baba Léno (Guinea)
17 September 2017
18:00

Senegal	4–0	Benin
Djitte 29'; Kane 39'; Diene 60' (pen.); Ndiaye 85'	Report

Cape Coast Sports Stadium, Cape Coast
Referee: Cecil Fleischer (Ghana)

19 September 2017
18:00

Niger	1–2	Benin
Adebayor 4'	Report	Fassinou 37'; Elegbede 87'

Nduom Sports Stadium, Elmina
Referee: Daniel Laryea (Ghana)
19 September 2017
18:00

Senegal	0–0	Ivory Coast
	Report

Cape Coast Sports Stadium, Cape Coast
Referee: Cecil Fleischer (Ghana)

== Knockout stage ==
=== Bracket ===
Semi-finals
21 September - Cape Coast
Benin	0
Nigeria	1
21 September - Cape Coast
Ghana	2
Niger	0

Final
24 September - Cape Coast
Ghana	4
Nigeria	1
Third place
24 September - Cape Coast
Niger	2
Benin	1

=== Semi-finals ===
21 September 2017
15:00

Benin	0–1	Nigeria
	Report	Ali 10'

Cape Coast Sports Stadium, Cape Coast
Referee: Baba Léno (Guinea)

21 September 2017
18:00

Ghana	2–0	Niger
Kizito 31'; St. Sarfo 79'	Report

Cape Coast Sports Stadium, Cape Coast
Referee: Yanissou Bebou (Togo)

=== Third-place playoff ===
24 September 2017
14:00

Niger	2–1	Benin
Halidou 29'; Adebayor 85'	Report	Yarou 90'

Cape Coast Sports Stadium, Cape Coast
Referee: Boukari Ouedraogo (Burkina Faso)

=== Final ===
24 September 2017
18:00

Ghana	4–1	Nigeria
St. Sarfo 44', 78' (pen.); Antigah 60' (pen.); Cobbinah 90+3'	Report	Ali 90+5'

Cape Coast Sports Stadium, Cape Coast
Referee: Daouda Gueye (Senegal)

== Goalscorers ==
3 goals

- (Ghana) Stephen Sarfo
- (Niger) Victorien Adebayor

2 goals

- (Ghana) Vincent Antigah
- (Ghana) Winful Cobbinah
- (Ghana) Kwame Kizito
- (Guinea) Abdoulaye Camara
- (Mali) Moussa Kone
- (Niger) Idrissa Halidou
- (Nigeria) Rabiu Ali
- (Nigeria) Moses Peter

1 goal

- (Benin) Jules Elegbede
- (Benin) Rodrigue Fassinou
- (Benin) Charbel Gomez
- (Benin) Ibrahim Ogoulola
- (Benin) Agnide Osseni
- (Benin) Nabil Yarou
- (Burkina Faso) Hassamy Sansan Dah
- (Ghana) Samuel Sarfo
- (Guinea) Sekou Keita
- (Guinea-Bissau) Gilson Correia
- (Mali) Mandala Konte
- (Mauritania) Samba Cheikh
- (Niger) Hinsa Issoufou
- (Niger) Boubacar Hainikoye Soumana
- (Nigeria) Anthony Okpotu
- (Nigeria) Moses Okoro
- (Senegal) Ablaye Diene
- (Senegal) Moussa Djitte
- (Senegal) Mohammed Kane
- (Senegal) Assane Mbodj
- (Senegal) Amadu Dia Ndiaye

== Awards ==
=== Player of the tournament ===
- (Ghana) Isaac Twum

=== Golden boot ===
- (Ghana) Stephen Sarfo

=== Golden Glove ===
- (Nigeria) Ikechukwu Ezenwa

=== Best XI ===
The team of the tournament was announced on 27 September 2017.

Goalkeeper	Defenders	Midfielders	Forwards	Substitutions
(Nigeria) Ikechukwu Ezenwa	(Ghana) Thomas Abbey (Guinea) Conde Aminata (Senegal) Ablaye Diene (Nigeria) Osas Okoro	(Niger) Adebayor Zakari Adje (Nigeria) Afeez Aremu (Benin) Charbel Gomez (Ghana) Isaac Twum	(Ghana) Winful Cobbinah (Ghana) Stephen Sarfo	(Ivory Coast) Hortalien Ble Zadi (GK) (Nigeria) Chima Akas (Guinea) Abdoulaye Camara (Niger) Boubacar Haini (Nigeria) Adeleye Olamikelan (Niger) Souleymane Sakou (Niger) Daouda Yussif

== Prize money ==
The prize was awarded in form of US dollars:

Position	Prize money (US Dollars)
Winner	100,000
Runner-up	50,000
Third place	25,000
Fourth place	10,000
Four losing semi-finalists	10,000
Four second round finishers	5,000
