= 2007 Amílcar Cabral Cup =

Tournament details
- Host country: Guinea-Bissau
- Dates: 30 November – 10 December
- Teams: 7
- Venue(s): 2 (in 1 host city)

Final positions
- Champions: Mali (3rd title)
- Runners-up: Cape Verde

Tournament statistics
- Top scorer(s): Meïssa Binta Ndiaye
- Best player(s): Souleymane Dembélé

The 2007 Amílcar Cabral Cup was held in Bissau, Guinea Bissau at the Estádio Nacional 24 de Setembro and Estádio Lino Correia from 30 November until 10 December 2007. The winner was Mali, which beat Cape Verde 2-1 to win the tournament.

== Group stage ==
=== Group A ===
Team	Pld	W	D	L	GF	GA	GD	Pts
Guinea-Bissau	2	1	1	0	3	1	+2	4
Senegal (U-23 Team)	2	1	1	0	2	1	+1	4
Sierra Leone	2	0	0	2	0	3	-3	0
Mauritania	withdrew							

30 Nov 2007

(U-23 Team) Senegal	1 – 0	Sierra Leone
Meïssa Binta Ndiaye 22'

2 Dec 2007

Guinea-Bissau	2 – 0	Sierra Leone
Emiliano Té 8'; Suleimane Baio 49'

4 Dec 2007

Guinea-Bissau	1 – 1	Senegal (U-23 Team)
Bacari Djaló 39' (pen.)		Meïssa Binta Ndiaye 69'

=== Group B ===
Team	Pld	W	D	L	GF	GA	GD	Pts
Mali (B Team)	3	2	0	1	4	2	+2	6
Cape Verde	3	1	2	0	1	0	+1	5
Gambia	3	1	1	1	3	2	+1	4
Guinea (B Team)	3	0	1	2	1	5	-4	1

1 Dec 2007

(B Team) Guinea	0 – 0	Cape Verde

1 Dec 2007

(B Team) Mali	2 – 0	Gambia
Bakary Coulibaly 48'; Souleymane Dembélé 88'

3 Dec 2007

(B Team) Guinea	1 – 2	Mali (B Team)
Abdoul Karim Sylla 30'		Bakary Coulibaly 47'; Souleymane Dembélé 81'

3 Dec 2007

Cape Verde	0 – 0	Gambia

5 Dec 2007

(B Team) Guinea	0 – 3	Gambia
		Abdou Darboe 9', 47'; Ousmane Kunta 56'

5 Dec 2007

Cape Verde	1 – 0	Mali (B Team)
Cadmiel Alves Kadu 10'

== Knockout stage ==
=== Semi-finals ===
7 Dec 2007

Guinea-Bissau	1 – 1 (2 – 3 pen.)	Cape Verde
Adilson 7'		Babanco 10'

After the draw in 90', they immediately went into penalty shootout. No extra time was played.

7 Dec 2007

(B Team) Mali	2 – 1	Senegal (U-23 Team)

=== Third place match ===
9 Dec 2007

Guinea-Bissau	1 – 2	Senegal (U-23 Team)
Mamadi Danfa Baba 77'		Meïssa Binta Ndiaye 61', 67'

=== Final ===
9 Dec 2007

(B Team) Mali	(abandoned)	Cape Verde

Match was abandoned at 0–0 in 30' due to power failure.

10 Dec 2007

(B Team) Mali	2 – 1 (replay)	Cape Verde
Bakary Coulibaly 4'; Souleymane Dembélé 24'		João Tigana Robalo 7'

== Awards ==
- Best player: Souleymane Dembélé (Mali)
- Best goal keeper: Fock (Cape Verde)
- Top scorer: Meïssa Binta Ndiaye (Senegal)
- Best referee: Ousmane Karambé (Mali)

== Sources ==
- rsssf.com results
