= Yarou =

Yarou is a surname. Notable people with the surname include:

- Mouphtaou Yarou (born 1990), Beninese basketball player
- Nabil Yarou (born 1993), Beninese footballer
