= Carlos Morais =

Carlos Morais may refer to:

- Carlos Morais (basketball) (born 1985), Angolan basketball player
- Carlos Pedro Silva Morais, Cape Verdean association football (soccer) player
