= Osséni =

Osséni is a surname. Notable people with the surname include:

- Agnidé Osséni (born 1995), Beninese footballer
- Bachirou Osséni (1985–2019), Beninese footballer
