= Elegbedé =

Elegbedé is a surname. Notable people with the surname include:

- Babatunde Elegbede (1939–1994), Nigerian military politician
- Jules Elegbedé (born 1993), Beninese footballer
- Kayode Elegbede (born 1955), Nigerian sprinter
