= Fassinou =

Fassinou is a surname. Notable people with the surname include:

- Adélaïde Fassinou (born 1955), Beninese writer
- Rodrigue Fassinou (born 1999), Beninese footballer
