= Minoungou =

Minoungou is a surname. Notable people with the surname include:

- Dieudonné Minoungou (born 1981), Burkinabé footballer
- Georgi Minoungou (born 2002), Burkina Faso international footballer
