= Stephen Sarfo =

Ghanaian footballer (born 1992)

Personal information
- Full name: Stephen Kwadwo Sarfo
- Date of birth: 25 May 1992 (age 34)
- Place of birth: Kumasi, Ghana
- Position: Forward

Team information
- Current team: Al-Ramadi

Senior career*
Years	Team	Apps	(Gls)
2015	Wa All Stars		
2016	Berekum Arsenal		
2017–2018	Berekum Chelsea	30	(15)
2018	Smouha	5	(0)
2018–2019	Tadamon Sour	20	(7)
2019–2020	Bourj	2	(1)
2020	Al-Mina'a		
2020–2021	Berekum Chelsea	23	(1)
2022	Tadamon Sour	0	(0)
2022	Bourj	11	(2)
2023	Al-Hudood		
2024	Peshmerga Sulaymaniya		
2025–	Al-Ramadi		

International career^{‡}
2017	Ghana	1	(0)
- * Club domestic league appearances and goals as of 5 March 2026 ‡ National team caps and goals as of 5 March 2026

Stephen Kwadwo Sarfo (born 25 May 1992) is a Ghanaian professional footballer who plays as a forward.

== Club career ==
In February 2020, Sarfo joined Iraqi club Al-Mina'a. In July 2022, he returned to Lebanese club Tadamon Sour, before promptly moving to his former club Bourj in August of the same year.

== International career ==
Sarfo made his first senior appearance for Ghana on 25 May 2017, in a 1–1 draw in friendly match against Benin.

== Honours ==
Ghana

- WAFU Cup of Nations: 2017

Individual

- WAFU Cup of Nations top-scorer: 2017
