= Nduom Sports Stadium =

Sports Stadium

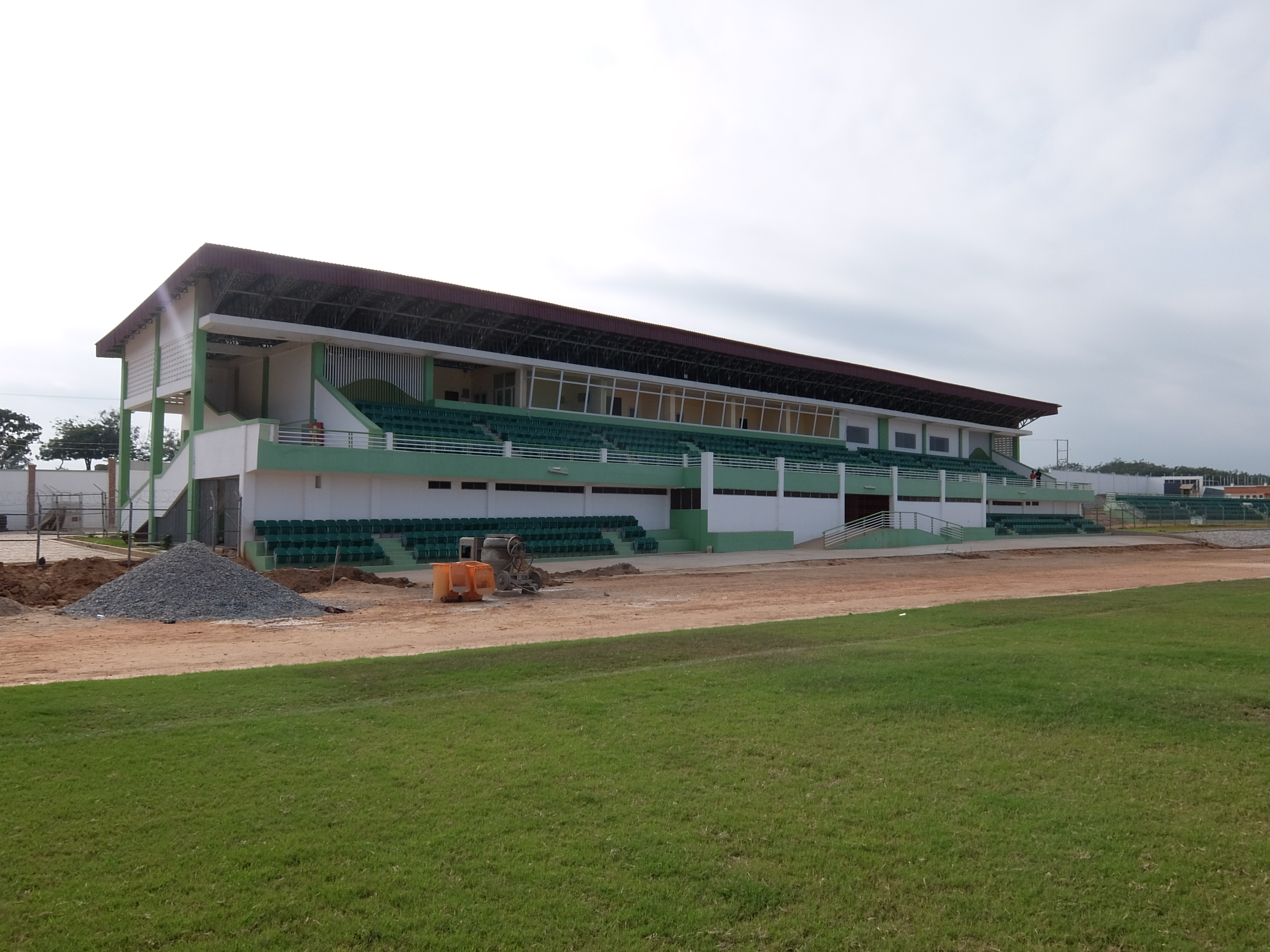
- Interactive map of Nduom Sports Stadium
- Location: Elmina, Ghana
- Coordinates: 5°5′50″N 1°22′55″W
- Capacity: 5,000
- Surface: Grass

Tenant
- Elmina Sharks F.C.

The Nduom Sports Stadium is a stadium in Elmina. It is the home venue of Elmina Sharks F.C., a Ghanaian Premier League side owned by Dr Nduom's Groupe Nduom (GN) conglomerate.

The stadium was one of the two venues (along with the Cape Coast Sports Stadium) of the 2017 West African Football Union (WAFU) Cup of Nations, which was held in September 2017.
