= Toni Varela =

Cape Verdean footballer (born 1986)

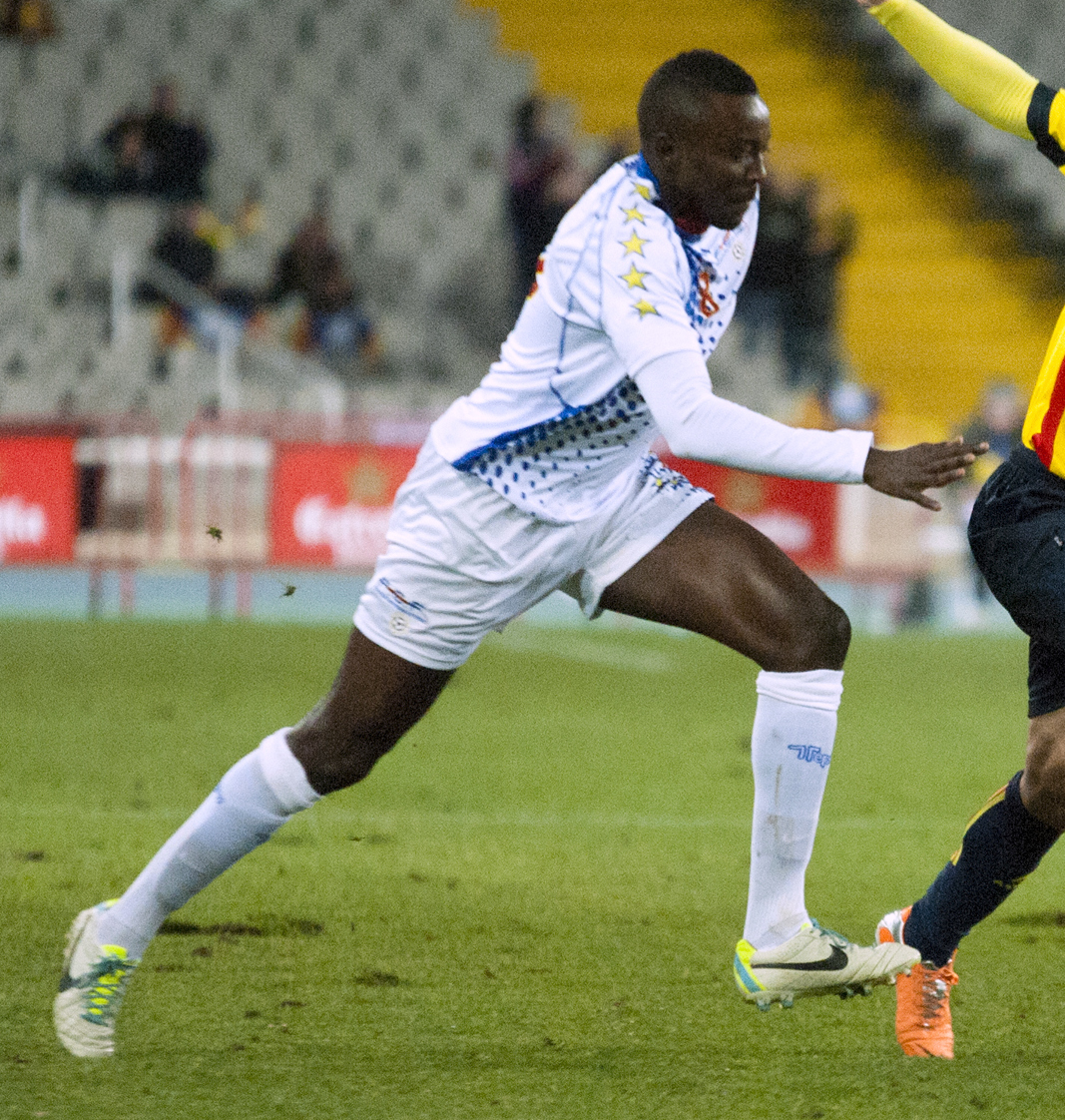
- Varela with Cape Verde in 2013

Personal information
- Full name: Toni Santos Varela Monteiro
- Date of birth: 13 June 1986 (age 40)
- Place of birth: Santa Catarina, Cape Verde
- Height: 1.71 m (5 ft 7 in)
- Position: Midfielder

Youth career
- RFC Rotterdam
- Sparta '25
- 2006–2008: RKC Waalwijk

Senior career*
Years	Team	Apps	(Gls)
2008–2011	RKC Waalwijk	74	(1)
2011–2013	Sparta Rotterdam	49	(1)
2013–2014	FC Dordrecht	6	(0)
2014	Levadiakos	14	(2)
2014–2015	Excelsior	16	(0)
2015–2016	Al-Jahra		
2016–2018	SV Horn	21	(1)
2018	CR Al Hoceima	2	(0)

International career
2010–2016	Cape Verde	25	(1)
- * Club domestic league appearances and goals

Toni Santos Varela Monteiro (born 13 June 1986) is a former Cape Verdean footballer.

== Club career ==
=== RKC Waalwijk ===
Varela made his first team debut for RKC Waalwijk in the Eerste Divisie as a 46th minute substitute in a 2–2 draw against ADO Den Haag on 24 August 2007.

On 26 February 2009, Varela's was extended until 30 June 2011, because of his progression in the first team.

=== Sparta Rotterdam ===
In July 2011, Toni Varela joined Sparta Rotterdam on a free transfer. He was released in the summer of 2013, having played 49 matches for the team in which he scored once.

=== FC Dordrecht ===
In November 2013, Varela signed a deal with Eerste Divisie side FC Dordrecht until the end of the season. However, he left the team in January 2014.

=== Levadiakos ===
In January 2014, Varela signed with Greek side Levadiakos.

=== Excelsior ===
On 5 September 2014, Varela signed a one-year deal with Eredivisie side Excelsior.

== International career ==
Varela is a Cape Verdean international. He made his debut for Cape Verde in an exhibition match against Portugal on 24 May 2010. Varela came on as a 73d minute substitute for Lito.

In 2013 he played in all matches at 2013 Africa Cup of Nations where his team advanced to the quarterfinals, the best result in the history of the national team.

== Honours ==
=== Club ===
RKC Waalwijk:

- Eerste Divisie: 2010–11
