= Marlin Piana =

Congolese footballer (born 1982)

Personal information
- Full name: Marlin Kikeba Piana
- Date of birth: 17 July 1982 (age 44)
- Place of birth: Kinshasa, Zaire
- Height: 1.81 m (5 ft 11 in)
- Position: Forward

Senior career*
Years	Team	Apps	(Gls)
2000–2003	Troyes B	52	(16)
2001–2002	Troyes	2	(0)
2003–2004	Oțelul Galați	11	(0)
2004	Sint-Truidense	5	(0)
2005	Lommel United	12	(5)
2006–2007	Clermont Foot		
2007–2008	Ironi Kiryat Shmona		
2009–2010	Ashton United		
2011	Congleton Town	2	(1)
2011–2012	Ashton United		
2012–2013	Prescot Cables		

International career
2002–2004	Congo DR	7	(4)
- * Club domestic league appearances and goals

Marlin Kikeba Piana (born 17 July 1982) is a Congolese former footballer.

== Career ==
Piana began his career in France for Troyes AC in Ligue 1.

He was part of the Congolese 2004 African Nations Cup team, who finished bottom of their group in the first round of competition, thus failing to secure qualification for the quarter-finals.

In February 2007, he was on trial at English Football League One side Leyton Orient.

In July 2009, Piana joined Northern Premier League side Ashton United but suffered a knee injury that ruled him out for the majority of the season. He left the club in September 2010.

He later returned to Ashton United for a second spell.

== Career statistics ==
=== International ===
Appearances and goals by national team and year
National team	Year	Apps	Goals
DR Congo	2002	2	2
DR Congo	2003	3	2
DR Congo	2004	2	0
Total		7	4

Scores and results list DR Congo's goal tally first, score column indicates score after each Piana goal.

List of international goals scored by Marlin Piana
No.	Date	Venue	Opponent	Score	Result	Competition
1	8 September 2002	Misurata Stadium, Misrata, Libya	Libya	2–3	2–3	2004 Africa Cup of Nations qualification
2	13 October 2002	Stade des Martyrs, Kinshasa, DR Congo	Botswana	2–0	2–0	2004 Africa Cup of Nations qualification
3	8 June 2003	Stade des Martyrs, Kinshasa, DR Congo	Swaziland	1–0	2–0	2004 Africa Cup of Nations qualification
4	22 June 2003	Stade des Martyrs, Kinshasa, DR Congo	Libya	2–1	2–1	2004 Africa Cup of Nations qualification
