= Amadou Touré =

Footballer (born 1982)

Personal information
- Date of birth: 27 September 1982 (age 44)
- Place of birth: Bujumbura, Burundi
- Height: 1.77 m (5 ft 10 in)
- Position: Defender

Youth career
- 1999–2000: US Comoe
- 2000–2002: ASFA Yennega

Senior career*
Years	Team	Apps	(Gls)
2002–2003	Tours	6	(3)
2003–2006	R.A.E.C. Mons	44	(4)
2006–2010	K.V.C. Willebroek-Meerhof		
2009	→ R.O.C. de Charleroi-Marchienne (loan)	11	(1)
2010–2011	R.O.C. de Charleroi-Marchienne		
2011–2015	Wiltz 71	64	(2)
2016–2018	Sporting Mertzig		
2018–2019	AS Wincrange		

International career
2000–2006	Burkina Faso	24	(11)
- * Club domestic league appearances and goals

Amadou Touré (born 27 September 1982) is a former professional footballer who played as a defender. Born in Burundi, he represented the Burkina Faso national team at international level.

== Club career ==
The Burundi-born Touré began his career 1999 at USFRAN at Bobo Dioulasso in First ligue before joining ASFA. He played two years by ASFA Yennega and moved than to France club Tours FC. At Tours scored three goals in six games and joined in July 2003 to R.A.E.C. Mons, the club represented three years, then joined in the Promotion and signed a contract by KFC Willebroek-Meerhof in 2006. Amadou stays here for two and a half year and joined than on 9 December 2008 to R.O.C. de Charleroi-Marchienne.

== International career ==
Touré was part of the Burkinabé team which finished bottom of their group both in the 2002 African Nations Cup and the 2004 African Nations Cup.

== Career statistics ==
=== International ===
Scores and results list Burkina Faso's goal tally first, score column indicates score after each Touré goal.

List of international goals scored by Amadou Touré
No.	Date	Venue	Opponent	Score	Result	Competition	Ref.
1	9 April 2000	Addis Ababa Stadium, Addis Ababa, Ethiopia	Ethiopia	1–2	1–2	2002 FIFA World Cup qualification	
2	9 July 2000	Stade du 4 Août, Ouagadougou, Burkina Faso	Guinea	2–2	2–3	2002 FIFA World Cup qualification	
3	26 December 2001	Stade Léopold Sédar Senghor, Dakar, Senegal	Senegal	1–0	4–2	Friendly	
4	26 December 2001	Stade Léopold Sédar Senghor, Dakar, Senegal	Senegal	3–1	4–2	Friendly	
5	15 January 2002	Stade du 4 Août, Ouagadougou, Burkina Faso	Zambia	1–0	2–1	Friendly	
6	30 January 2002	Stade Baréma Bocoum, Mopti, Mali	Ghana	1–0	1–2	2002 African Cup of Nations	
7	13 October 2002	Stade du 4 Août, Ouagadougou, Burkina Faso	Central African Republic	1–1	2–1	2004 African Cup of Nations qualification	
8	7 June 2003	Stade du 4 Août, Ouagadougou, Burkina Faso	Mozambique	3–0	4–0	2004 African Cup of Nations qualification	
9	21 June 2006	Stade du 4 Août, Ouagadougou, Burkina Faso	Congo	1–0	3–0	2004 African Cup of Nations qualification	
10	13 June 2004	Stade du 4 Août, Ouagadougou, Burkina Faso	Benin	1–1	4–2	Friendly	
11	20 June 2004	Stade des Martyrs, Kinshasa, Democratic Republic of Congo	DR Congo	1–1	2–3	2006 FIFA World Cup qualification	
