= Bacari Djaló =

Bissau-Guinean footballer

Personal information
- Full name: Bacari Djaló
- Date of birth: 12 August 1983 (age 43)
- Place of birth: Bissau, Guinea-Bissau
- Height: 1.80 m (5 ft 11 in)
- Position: Forward

Senior career*
Years	Team	Apps	(Gls)
2001	Beneditense	1	(0)
2002	Alcobaça		
2002–2003	Bidoeirense		
2003–2004	SC Pombal	37	(6)
2004–2005	Felgueiras	30	(5)
2005–2006	Famalicão	26	(10)
2006–2007	Vitória Guimarães	9	(1)
2007–2008	Vila Meã	13	(5)
2008	Penafiel	11	(1)
2008–2009	Ribeirão	24	(9)
2009	Carregado	8	(0)
2010	Famalicão	15	(7)
2010–2011	Bragança	21	(4)
2011–2012	Académico Viseu	28	(6)
2012	Pinhalnovense	3	(0)
2012–2013	Juventude Évora	22	(6)
2013	Caldas	9	(0)
2014	Pêro Pinheiro	11	(4)
2014–2015	Titus Lamadelaine	22	(9)
2015	Titus Pétange	1	(0)
2015–2019	Atert Bissen	36	(14)
Total		327	(87)

International career
2007	Guinea-Bissau	2	(0)
- * Club domestic league appearances and goals

Bacari Djaló (born 12 August 1983 in Bissau) is a Bissau-Guinean former footballer who played as a forward.
