= Mikimba =

Togolese footballer

Personal information
- Full name: Jeferson Paulo Rodrigues de Souza
- Date of birth: 14 December 1981 (age 44)
- Place of birth: Joaçaba, Santa Catarina, Brazil
- Height: 1.72 m (5 ft 8 in)
- Position: Right winger

Senior career*
Years	Team	Apps	(Gls)
	Joaçaba	?	(?)
2002–2003	Chapecoense	?	(?)
2003	→ Paraná (loan)	–	(–)
2003	Metz B and Metz	5	(2)
2004–2005	Chapecoense	?	(?)
2006–2008	Cianorte	?	(?)
2008	Veranópolis	?	(?)
2008	Águia Negra	6	(1)
2008–2009	Chapecoense	?	(?)
2009	Águia Negra	?	(?)
2009	Nacional Manaus	5	(0)
2010	Paranavaí	?	(?)
2010	Francisco Beltrão	?	(?)
2011	Colatina SE	?	(?)
2011	Glória		
2011	Caxias		
2012	Comercial-MS		
2013	Novo Hamburgo		
2013	Riograndense		
2013	Águia Negra		

International career^{‡}
2003	Togo	2	(1)
- * Club domestic league appearances and goals as of 30 January 2009 ‡ National team caps and goals as of 30 January 2009

Jeferson Paulo Rodrigues de Souza (born 14 December 1981), known as Mikimba, is a former footballer who played as a right winger. Born in Brazil, he played for the Togo national team.

== Biography ==
Mikimba was born in Joaçaba, a small city situated in the Brazilian state of Santa Catarina. He also hold Togolese citizenship.

== International career ==
Mikimba made his Togo national team debut on 8 June 2003 in a 2004 African Cup of Nations Qualifying match against Cape Verde, in Lomé. That day Les Eperviers (the nickname of Togo national football team) won 5–2.

=== International goals ===
#	Date	Venue	Opponent	Score	Result	Competition
1	8 June 2003	Stade de Kégué, Lomé, Togo	Cape Verde	4 – 2	5 - 2	2004 African Cup of Nations Qualifying match
