= Moussoro Kabirou =

Footballer (born 1983)

Kabi Moussoro
Personal information
- Full name: Kabirou Moussoro Moubang
- Date of birth: 1 September 1983 (age 43)
- Place of birth: Douala, Cameroon
- Height: 1.73 m (5 ft 8 in)
- Position: Striker

Youth career
- 1997–1998: Kadji Sports Academy

Senior career*
Years	Team	Apps	(Gls)
1999	Kadji Sports Academy		
1999–2000	Valencia B		
2000–2004	Pau FC	73	(9)
2004–2005	FC Martigues	5	(0)
2005–2006	Saint-Pryvé Saint-Hilaire FC		
2006–2007	ES Viry-Châtillon		
2007–2008	St. Amand AS		

International career
2003–2004	Benin	6	(0)
- * Club domestic league appearances and goals

Kabirou Moussoro Moubang (born 1 September 1983) is a former professional footballer who played as a striker. Born in Cameroon, he made nine appearances for the Benin national team scoring once in 2003 and 2004.

== Career ==
Kabirou was born in Douala, Cameroon. He played several seasons for Pau FC in the French Championnat National.

He was part of the Beninese 2004 African Nations Cup team.
