= Benjamin Sesay =

Sierra Leonean footballer

Personal information
- Full name: Benjamin Dondem Sesay
- Date of birth: April 18, 1981 (age 45)
- Place of birth: Freetown, Sierra Leone
- Height: 1.86 m (6 ft 1 in)
- Position: Striker

Senior career*
| Years | Team | Apps | (Gls) |
| 2005 | FCV Dender | 8 | (1) |
| 2006 | Hoogstraten VV | 13 | (7) |
| 2006 | Berchem Sport | | |
| 2007–2008 | Olympiacos Volos | 4 | (1) |
| 2008 | Tempo Overijse | | |
- KFCO Burst

International career
| 2006 | Sierra Leone | | |
- * Club domestic league appearances and goals

Benjamin Dondem Sesay (born April 18, 1981, in Sierra Leone) is a Sierra Leonean retired footballer who played a striker.
