= Bill (footballer, born 1978) =

Association football player

Personal information
- Full name: Alessandro Faria
- Date of birth: 7 June 1978 (age 48)
- Place of birth: Porto Alegre, Rio Grande do Sul, Brazil
- Height: 1.82 m (6 ft 0 in)
- Position: Forward

Youth career
- Vila Nova
- Ponte Preta-SP

Senior career*
| Years | Team | Apps | (Gls) |
| | Ponte Preta-SP | – | (–) |
| 2000 | El Paso Patriots | 8 | (–) |
| 2001 | Caxias | – | (–) |
| 2002 | Guarany de Bagé | – | (–) |
| 2003–2004 | Chapecoense | ? | (10) |
| 2004–2005 | 15 de Novembro | – | (–) |
| 2005 | Tubarão F.C. | ? | (3) |
| 2006 | São José de Porto Alegre | – | (–) |
| 2006 | Pelotas | – | (–) |
| 2006 | River (Ipauí) | – | (–) |
| 2006–2007 | Novo Hamburgo | – | (–) |
| 2007 | Bragantino | – | (–) |
| 2007 | Bagé | – | (–) |
| 2007–2008 | BSV Rehden | – | (–) |
| 2008 | Oeste de Chapecó | – | (–) |
| 2009 | Atlético de Ibirama | – | (–) |
| 2009 | Videira | – | (–) |
| 2010–2011 | CENE | | |
| 2011 | Riopardense | – | (–) |
| 2011 | Aimoré | – | (–) |
| 2012 | Glória | | |
| 2012 | Cometa | | |

International career^{‡}
| 2003–2004 | Togo | 6 | (3) |
- * Club domestic league appearances and goals as of 30 January 2009 ‡ National team caps and goals as of 30 January 2009

Alessandro Faria (born 7 June 1978), known as Bill, is a former footballer who played as a forward. Born and raised in Brazil, he has been naturalized by Togo and played for that national team.

== Career ==
He was signed by BSV Schwarz-Weiß Rehden in November 2007, and returned to Brazil for Oeste de Chapecó in September 2008.

== International career ==
Bill made his Togo national team debut on June 8, 2003, in a 2004 African Cup of Nations Qualifying match against Cape Verde, in Lomé. That day Les Eperviers (the nickname of Togo national football team) won by 5-2 and he scored one of the Togolese goals.
Bill also played for Togo against the Ghanaian club Asante Kotoko in a friendly match on 29 June 2003 in Stade de Kégué, Lomé.

=== International goals ===
| # | Date | Venue | Opponent | Score | Result | Competition |
|---|---|---|---|---|---|---|
| 1 | 8 June 2003 | Stade de Kégué, Lomé, Togo | Cape Verde | 1 – 0 | 5 – 2 | 2004 African Cup of Nations Qualifying match |
| 2 | 22 June 2003 | Stade de Kégué, Lomé, Togo | Kenya | 1 – 0 | 2 – 0 | 2004 African Cup of Nations Qualifying match |
| 3 | 22 June 2003 | Stade de Kégué, Lomé, Togo | Kenya | 2 – 0 | 2 – 0 | 2004 African Cup of Nations Qualifying match |
