= 2000 Amílcar Cabral Cup =

Tournament details
- Host country: Cape Verde
- Dates: May 4–14
- Teams: 8
- Venue: 1 (in 1 host city)

Final positions
- Champions: Cape Verde (1st title)
- Runners-up: Senegal
- Third place: Guinea

Tournament statistics
- Matches played: 15
- Goals scored: 41 (2.73 per match)

The 2000 Amílcar Cabral Cup was held in Estádio da Várzea, the national stadium of Cape Verde. The tournament was originally scheduled November 27—December 5, 1999, but as heavy rain delayed renovations to the national stadium, it was postponed to May 2000.

== Group stage ==
=== Group A ===
Team	Pts	Pld	W	D	L	GF	GA	GD
Senegal	5	3	1	2	0	6	3	+3
Cape Verde	5	3	1	2	0	4	3	+1
Gambia	3	3	0	3	0	4	4	0
Sierra Leone	1	3	0	1	2	2	6	–4

May 4, 2000

Gambia	1 – 1	Cape Verde

May 4, 2000

Senegal	3 – 0 (awarded)	Sierra Leone

Sierra Leone arrived late; the match was not played, instead, it was awarded 3–0 to Senegal.

May 6, 2000

Cape Verde	1 – 0	Sierra Leone

May 6, 2000

Gambia	1 – 1	Senegal

May 8, 2000

Cape Verde	2 – 2	Senegal

May 8, 2000

Gambia	2 – 2	Sierra Leone

=== Group B ===
Team	Pts	Pld	W	D	L	GF	GA	GD
Guinea	7	3	2	1	0	6	3	+3
Mali	4	3	1	1	1	6	7	–1
Guinea-Bissau	3	3	1	0	2	4	5	–1
Mauritania	2	3	0	2	1	3	4	–1

May 5, 2000

Guinea	3 – 1	Mali

May 5, 2000

Guinea-Bissau	1 – 0	Mauritania

May 7, 2000

Guinea	1 – 1	Mauritania

May 7, 2000

Mali	3 – 2	Guinea-Bissau

May 9, 2000

Guinea	2 – 1	Guinea-Bissau

May 9, 2000

Mali	2 – 2	Mauritania

== Knockout stage ==
=== Bracket ===
Results decided after extra time are indicated by (a.e.t.), and results decided via a penalty shoot-out are indicated by (p).

=== Semi-finals ===
May 11, 2000

Senegal	2 – 2 (3 – 2 pen.)	Mali

May 11, 2000

Cape Verde	2 – 0	Guinea

=== Third place match ===
May 14, 2000

Guinea	2 – 0	Mali

=== Final ===
May 14, 2000

Cape Verde	1 – 0	Senegal
Toni 33'
