= Babanco =

Cape Verdean footballer (born 1985)

Personal information
- Full name: Elvis Manuel Monteiro Macedo
- Date of birth: 27 July 1985 (age 41)
- Place of birth: Praia, Cape Verde
- Height: 1.77 m (5 ft 9 1/2 in)
- Position: Midfielder

Senior career*
Years	Team	Apps	(Gls)
2007–2009	Sporting Praia		
2009–2010	Boavista (CPV)		
2010–2012	Arouca	54	(7)
2012–2013	Olhanense	22	(0)
2013–2016	Estoril	61	(0)
2016–2017	AEL Limassol	7	(0)
2017–2019	Feirense	67	(4)
2019–2020	Chaves	1	(0)
2020–2024	União Leiria	61	(3)
Total		273	(14)

International career
2007–2019	Cape Verde	62	(5)
- * Club domestic league appearances and goals

Elvis Manuel Monteiro Macedo (born 27 July 1985), known as Babanco, is a Cape Verdean former professional footballer who played as a midfielder.

He spent most of his career in Portugal, making 150 appearances in the Primeira Liga for Olhanense, Estoril and Feirense.

Babanco earned a record 62 caps for Cape Verde from 2007 to 2019, representing the country at the Africa Cup of Nations in 2013 and 2015.

== Club career ==
Born in Praia, Babanco started playing football with local Sporting Clube da Praia. In 2009, he joined another club in his hometown, Boavista FC.

In the 2010–11 season, Babanco moved to F.C. Arouca from Portugal, which was competing for the first time ever in the Segunda Liga. He was first choice during his two-year spell, with the Aveiro District side consecutively managing to retain their league status.

On 5 June 2012, Babanco signed a two-year deal with Primeira Liga club S.C. Olhanense. A year later, he made his way to G.D. Estoril Praia on a free transfer, valid until 2016.

After starting the season with AEL Limassol in the Cypriot First Division, Babanco rescinded his contract and returned to Portugal's top flight on 24 January 2017 on an 18-month deal at C.D. Feirense. He scored his first goal in the division on 3 March 2018 to open a 3–0 home win against Boavista FC.

Babanco joined G.D. Chaves of the second tier on 2 September 2019, with the 34-year-old agreeing to a one-year contract. He made only two competitive appearances during his spell at the Estádio Municipal Eng. Manuel Branco Teixeira, and subsequently moved to the lower leagues with U.D. Leiria.

On 5 June 2024, with Leiria back in the professional divisions, and having experienced a slight brain hemorrhage in March, Babanco announced his retirement at age 38.

== International career ==
Babanco made his senior international debut for Cape Verde on 9 September 2007, in a 4–0 away victory over Guinea in 2008 Africa Cup of Nations qualification. On 7 December he scored his first goal to equalise in a 1–1 draw with hosts Guinea-Bissau in the 2007 edition of the Amílcar Cabral Cup. On 24 May 2010, he appeared in a friendly in Covilhã with Portugal – who were preparing for the 2010 FIFA World Cup in South Africa – playing 60 minutes as the minnows (ranked 117th) managed a 0–0 draw.

Babanco was chosen for the 2013 Africa Cup of Nations – his country's first major tournament – where they were eliminated in the quarter-finals by Ghana. He was also called up two years later for the tournament in Equatorial Guinea.

== Career statistics ==
=== International ===
Appearances and goals by national team and year
National team	Year	Apps	Goals
Cave Verde	2007	3	1
Cave Verde	2008	3	1
Cave Verde	2009	4	1
Cave Verde	2010	5	0
Cave Verde	2011	5	1
Cave Verde	2012	7	0
Cave Verde	2013	10	0
Cave Verde	2014	6	0
Cave Verde	2015	8	1
Cave Verde	2016	2	0
Cave Verde	2017	4	0
Cave Verde	2018	4	0
Cave Verde	2019	1	0
Total		62	5

Scores and results list Cape Verde's goal tally first, score column indicates score after each Babanco goal.

List of international goals scored by Babanco
No.	Date	Venue	Opponent	Score	Result	Competition
1	7 December 2007	Estádio 24 de Setembro, Bissau, Guinea-Bissau	Guinea-Bissau	1–1 (3–2 p)	1–1	2007 Amílcar Cabral Cup
2	7 June 2008	Estádio da Várzea, Praia, Cape Verde	Tanzania	1–0	1–0	2010 FIFA World Cup qualification
3	28 March 2009	Estádio Marcelo Leitão, Sal, Cape Verde	Equatorial Guinea	2–0	5–0	Friendly
4	26 March 2011	Estádio da Várzea, Praia, Cape Verde	Liberia	2–0	4–2	2012 Africa Cup of Nations qualification
5	13 June 2015	Estádio da Várzea, Praia, Cape Verde	São Tomé and Príncipe	5–0	7–1	2017 Africa Cup of Nations qualification
