= Pius Kolagano =

Motswana footballer

Personal information
- Full name: Pius Kolagano
- Date of birth: 12 April 1979 (age 47)
- Place of birth: Botswana
- Position: Defender

Team information
- Current team: Uniao Flamengo Santos

Senior career*
Years	Team	Apps	(Gls)
2001–2002	Defence Force		
2002–2003	Dangerous Aces		
2003–2005	Dangerous Darkies		
2005–2007	Notwane FC		
2007–	Uniao Flamengo Santos		

International career
2002–2004	Botswana	15	(0)
- * Club domestic league appearances and goals

Pius Kolagano (born 12 April 1979) is a Motswana footballer who currently plays for Uniao Flamengo Santos as a defender. He won 15 caps for the Botswana national football team between 2002 and 2004.
