= Idrissa Halidou =

Nigerien footballer

Personal information
- Full name: Idrissa Halidou Garba
- Date of birth: 3 July 1982 (age 44)
- Place of birth: Niamey, Niger
- Height: 1.79 m (5 ft 10 in)
- Position: Forward

Team information
- Current team: AS GNN

Senior career*
Years	Team	Apps	(Gls)
2010	ASEC Mimosas		
2011	Stade Abidjan		
2012–2015	Séwé Sport		
2015–	AS GNN		

International career
2015–2021	Niger	16	(3)
- * Club domestic league appearances and goals

Idrissa Halidou (born 3 July 1982) is a Nigerien football striker who currently plays for AS GNN.

== Career statistics ==
=== International ===
Scores and results list Niger's goal tally first, score column indicates score after each Halidou goal.

List of international goals scored by Idrissa Halidou
No.	Date	Venue	Opponent	Score	Result	Competition
1	17 October 2015	Stade Général Seyni Kountché, Niamey, Niger	Togo	2–0	2–0	2016 African Nations Championship qualification
2	9 January 2016	Addis Ababa Stadium, Addis Ababa, Ethiopia	Ethiopia	1–0	1–1	Friendly
3	22 September 2019	Stade Général Seyni Kountché, Niamey, Niger	Ivory Coast	1–0	2–0	2020 African Nations Championship qualification
