= Suleimane Baio =

Guinean-born Bissau-Guinean footballer

Personal information
- Full name: Suleimane Baio
- Date of birth: August 12, 1983 (age 43)
- Place of birth: Conakry, Guinea
- Position: Midfielder

Team information
- Current team: CS Grevenmacher

Youth career
- 2001–2002: FC Tirsense

Senior career*
Years	Team	Apps	(Gls)
2002–2003	FC Tirsense		
2003–2004	CD Lousado		
2004–2005	AD São Pedro da Cova		
2005–2006	FC Tirsense		
2006–2007	CD Numancia	5	(0)
2007	UD Villa de Santa Brígida	2	(0)
2008	Kavala	19	(1)
2008	CF Caniçal	4	(1)
2009	SL Nelas	11	(2)
2009–2010	Alki Larnaca FC	9	(1)
2011–2012	Académico de Viseu F.C.	20	(2)
2012	FK Kukësi		
2012–2014	US Mondorf-les-Bains	8	(2)
2014–2018	FC Munsbach	4	(1)
2018–	CS Grevenmacher	0	(0)

International career
2007	Guinea-Bissau	1	(0)
- * Club domestic league appearances and goals

Suleimane Baio (born 12 August 1983 in Conakry, Guinea) is a Guinean-born Bissau-Guinean footballer who played for a number of teams including Spain's CD Numancia.

== Career ==
=== Spain ===
New to the Segunda División's CD Numancia for 2006/07, Baio was said to not have been disciplined and eager to learn at Los Numantinos, fielded four times and hitting the crossbar once despite a hat-trick at the friendly Torneo Triangular de Miranda 2006. Axed from Numancia at the finish of the season, he resorted to UD Villa de Santa Brígida but was dropped winter 2007.

=== Albania ===
Slotting two goals in a 2-1 friendly success over Olimpiku Tiranë which captivated the staff while on trial in 2012, the Guinean continued to be inspected but the opportunity fell through.

=== Luxembourg ===
Committing to Munsbach from US Mondorf-les-Bains at the end of the first half of 2014/15, the midfielder snatched five goals hosting Weiler late 2015 at the Luxembourg Cup.
