= Abdou Darboe =

Gambian football striker

Personal information
- Full name: Abdou Darboe
- Date of birth: 22 December 1990 (age 35)
- Place of birth: Gambia
- Height: 1.86 m (6 ft 1 in)
- Position: Striker

Team information
- Current team: Dhaka Abahani
- Number: 10

Senior career*
Years	Team	Apps	(Gls)
2007–2008	Armed Forces Banjul		
2009–2011	Hønefoss BK	15	(1)
2010	→ Mjøndalen (loan)	9	(2)
2011	Tønsberg	6	(2)
2013–2015	Bredaryds IK		
2015	Abahani Limited Dhaka		

International career
2007–2010	Gambia	4	(2)
- * Club domestic league appearances and goals

Abdou Darboe (born 22 December 1990) is a Gambian football striker who last played for Abahani Limited Dhaka.

== Club career ==
He played for Armed Forces Banjul before transferring on 27 April 2009 to Hønefoss BK. He left Hønefoss on 10 February 2011 and signed for FK Tønsberg. After two years with FK Tønsberg he signed for Bredaryds IK in Sweden.

== International career ==
He has been capped four times for the Gambian national team between 2007 and 2009.
