= Ikechukwu Ezenwa =

Nigerian footballer (born 1988)

Personal information
- Full name: Ikechukwu Vincent Ezenwa
- Date of birth: 16 October 1988 (age 38)
- Place of birth: Yenagoa, Nigeria
- Height: 1.81 m (5 ft 11 in)
- Position: Goalkeeper

Senior career*
Years	Team	Apps	(Gls)
2006–2008	Ocean Boys	56	(0)
2008–2011	Heartland F.C.	61	(0)
2011–2014	Sharks F.C.	45	(0)
2014–2016	Sunshine Stars	38	(0)
2016–2017	Ifeanyi Ubah F.C.	28	(0)
2017–2019	Enyimba International	4	(2)
2019	Heartland F.C.	0	(0)
2019–2023	Katsina United	11	(0)

International career
2007	Nigeria U20	3	(0)
2008	Nigeria U23	1	(0)
2015–2019	Nigeria	21	(0)
Medal record
Representing Nigeria
Men's football
Olympic Games
Silver medal – second place	2008 Beijing	Team
Africa Cup of Nations
Third place	2019 Egypt
- * Club domestic league appearances and goals

Ikechukwu Vincent Ezenwa (born 16 October 1988) is a Nigerian former professional footballer who played as a goalkeeper.

== Club career ==
Ezenwa began his football professional career with Ocean Boys before he moved to Heartland F.C. in July 2008. He moved to Ifeanyi Ubah FC in 2016. He then completed a move to Enyimba International.

He moved on to join Katsina United on 1 January 2019.

Former Sunshine Stars Coach, Daramola Nicholas Akinsehinwa, acted as Ezenwa's trainer between the years 2013 to 2016, during his playing time with Sunshine Stars. Akinsehinwa helped Ezenwa develop his potential, which made the Nigeria Super Eagles call-up possible. Ikechukwu Ezenwa was part of the Nigeria squad at the 2014 World Cup.

== International career ==
He was a member of the Nigeria U-23 at the 2008 Summer Olympics, featuring in the qualifier games.

He got the call up to the Nigeria national team in 2015 under the authority of coach Sunday Oliseh. Following the injury of Nigeria's first choice goalkeeper Carl Ikeme he was called up to be part of the squad in the World cup and Nations cup qualifications by Super Eagles coach Gernot Rohr and given the number 1 jersey replacing Ikeme as first choice goalkeeper of Nigeria.

Ezenwa showed some class of keeping during Nigeria's back to back matches against the ‘indomitable lions’ of Cameroon in the 2018 FIFA World Cup qualifiers. In May 2018, he was named in Nigeria's preliminary 30-man squad for the 2018 World Cup in Russia.

== Career statistics ==
Appearances and goals by national team and year
National team	Year	Apps	Goals
Nigeria	2015	3	0
Nigeria	2016	3	0
Nigeria	2017	6	0
Nigeria	2018	7	0
Nigeria	2019	2	0
Total		21	0
