= Mahamat Hissein =

Chadian footballer (born 1979)

Personal information
- Full name: Mahamat Hissein
- Date of birth: 3 March 1979 (age 47)
- Place of birth: N'Djamena, Chad
- Height: 1.82 m (6 ft 0 in)
- Position: Striker

Senior career*
Years	Team	Apps	(Gls)
1997–1998	Renaissance FC	43	(9)
1998	Kadji Sports Academy	5	(0)
1999–2000	K. Sint-Truidense V.V.	0	(0)
2000–2001	Entente Perrier Vergèze	9	(2)
2001–2002	Olympique Alès	9	(4)
2002–2004	FC Istres	29	(3)
2004–2006	FC Gueugnon	38	(3)
2006–2007	US Orléans	21	(8)
2007–2010	AS Moulins	58	(17)
2010–2012	AS Yzeure	16	(5)

International career
2002–2003	Chad	5	(2)
- * Club domestic league appearances and goals

Mahamat Hissein (born on 3 March 1979) is a Chadian footballer, who plays for French clubs.

== Career ==
Hissein spent four seasons playing in Ligue 2 for FC Istres and FC Gueugnon. (Note: Mahamat Hissein – French league stats at LFP – also available in French (archived))

=== Position ===
Having spent his entire career in France, he plays as an attacker.

== International career ==
Hissein has been selected for the national team.

== Clubs ==
- 1997–1999 : Renaissance FC
- 1999 : Kadji Sports Academy
- 1999–2000 : K. Sint-Truidense V.V.
- 2000–2001 : Vergèze
- 2001–2002 : Olympique Alès
- 2002–2004 : FC Istres
- 2004–2006 : FC Gueugnon
- 2006–2007 : US Orléans
- 2007–2010 : AS Moulins
- 2010–2012 : AS Yzeure

== See also ==
- List of Chad international footballers
