= Ibrahima Conté (footballer, born 1981) =

Guinean footballer

Personal information
- Full name: Ibrahima Sory Conté
- Date of birth: 3 June 1981 (age 45)
- Place of birth: Conakry, Guinea
- Position: Defender

Senior career*
Years	Team	Apps	(Gls)
2001–2005	Lokeren	64	(0)
2005–2006	Hafia FC		
2006–2007	Rodez AF		
2007–2008	Tours FC		

International career
	Guinea	20	(1)
- * Club domestic league appearances and goals as of 17:10, 18 July 2007 (GMT)

Ibrahima Sory Conté (born 3 June 1981) is a Guinean football player.

He was part of the Guinean 2004 African Nations Cup team, who finished second in their group in the first round of competition, before losing in the quarter finals to Mali. He was released in August 2008 by Tours FC.
