= Rodrigue Fassinou =

Beninese footballer (born 1999)

Personal information
- Full name: Rodrigue Yves Fassinou
- Date of birth: 22 May 1999 (age 27)
- Place of birth: Adjohoun, Benin
- Height: 1.78 m (5 ft 10 in)
- Position: Midfielder

Team information
- Current team: Loto-Popo FC

Senior career*
Years	Team	Apps	(Gls)
2016	ASPAC		
2017–2019	Les Buffles du Borgou		
2019–2020	ASPAC		
2021–	Loto-Popo FC		

International career^{‡}
2017–	Benin	17	(0)
- * Club domestic league appearances and goals ‡ National team caps and goals as of 10:45, 29 May 2025 (UTC)

Rodrigue Yves Fassinou (born 22 May 1999) is a Beninese footballer who plays as a midfielder for Loto-Popo FC and the Benin national team.

In May 2019, he was named in Benin's squad for the 2019 Africa Cup of Nations.
