= Jules Elegbedé =

Beninese footballer

Personal information
- Date of birth: 12 October 1993 (age 33)
- Place of birth: Ifangni, Benin
- Height: 1.73 m (5 ft 8 in)
- Position: Striker

Team information
- Current team: Energie

Senior career*
Years	Team	Apps	(Gls)
2010–2013	UNB		
2013–2014	Avrankou Omnisport		
2015	Atlantic City FA Mbankomo		
2016	Cosmos Bafia		
2017–	Energie		

International career^{‡}
2017–	Benin	6	(0)
- * Club domestic league appearances and goals as of 14:52, 10 December 2017 (UTC) ‡ National team caps and goals as of 14:52, 10 December 2017 (UTC)

Jules Elegbedé (born 12 October 1993) is a Beninese international footballer who plays for Energie, as a striker.
