= Nabil Yarou =

Beninese footballer

Personal information
- Full name: Abdel Nabil Yarou
- Date of birth: 16 June 1993 (age 33)
- Place of birth: Parakou, Benin
- Position: Defender

Team information
- Current team: Enyimba international

Senior career*
Years	Team	Apps	(Gls)
2012–2017	ASPAC		
2017–	Buffles de Borgou		
2020-	Enyimba international		

International career^{‡}
2017–	Benin	8	(1)
- * Club domestic league appearances and goals as of 21:13, 19 July 2018 (UTC) ‡ National team caps and goals as of 21:13, 19 July 2018 (UTC)

Abdel Nabil Yarou (born 16 June 1993) is a Beninese international footballer who plays for Enyimba FC, as a defender.

== Club career ==
Yarou began his career off with ASPAC, before signing for Buffles de Borgou in June 2017.

== International career ==
On 4 May 2017, Yarou made his debut for Benin in a 1–1 draw against Burkina Faso. On 31 May 2017, Yarou scored his first goal for Benin in a 1–1 draw against Ivory Coast.

=== International goals ===
Scores and results list Benin's goal tally first.

#	Date	Venue	Opponent	Score	Result	Competition
1	31 May 2017	Stade Robert Champroux, Abidjan, Ivory Coast	Ivory Coast	1–1	1–1	Friendly
