= Ibrahim Ogoulola =

Beninese footballer

Personal information
- Full name: Ibrahim Andres Ogoulola
- Date of birth: 3 February 2000 (age 26)
- Place of birth: Cotonou, Benin
- Height: 1.76 m (5 ft 9 in)
- Position: Midfielder

Senior career*
Years	Team	Apps	(Gls)
2016–2018	Requins de l'Atlantique		
2018–2019	Énergie SBEÉ Cotonou		
2019–2024	AS Sobemap		
2024–2025	Vita Club		

International career
2017–	Benin	8	(2)
- * Club domestic league appearances and goals as of 11 May 2025 (UTC)

Ibrahim Andres Ogoulola (born 3 February 2000) is a Beninese international footballer who plays for Tonnerre d'Abomey as a midfielder.

== Club career ==
Born in Cotonou, Ogoulola played in Benin for Requins de l'Atlantique, Énergie SBEÉ Cotonou, and AS Sobemap, before signing for Congolese Vita Club in July 2024.

== International career ==
=== International goals ===
Scores and results list Benin's goal tally first.

No.	Date	Venue	Opponent	Score	Result	Competition
1.	21 May 2017	Stade de l'Amitié, Cotonou, Benin	Burkina Faso	1–1	2–2	Friendly
2.	25 May 2017	Accra Sports Stadium, Accra, Ghana	Ghana	1–0	1–1	Friendly
