= Dieudonné Minoungou =

Burkinabé footballer

Personal information
- Date of birth: June 25, 1981 (age 45)
- Place of birth: Tenkodogo, Upper Volta
- Height: 1.82 m (6 ft 0 in)
- Position: Striker

Senior career*
Years	Team	Apps	(Gls)
1999–2001	Santos FC Ouagadougou	?	(?)
2001–2002	Grenoble	0	(0)
2002–2004	Tours	64	(19)
2004–2005	Brest	0	(0)
2005–2006	Rouen	16	(3)
2006–2007	AS Moulins	14	(4)
2008	F.C. Ryūkyū	17	(10)
2012–2013	Moulins Yzeure	1	(0)

International career
2002–2005	Burkina Faso	7	(3)
- * Club domestic league appearances and goals

Dieudonné "Dieudo" Minoungou (born June 25, 1981) is a Burkinabé former professional footballer who played as a striker.

== Club career ==
Minoungou was born in Tenkodogo. After the African Nations Cup Finals, he was transferred to Stade Brest 29 and one season later to FC Rouen.

== International career ==
He was a member of the Burkinabé 2004 African Nations Cup team, who finished bottom of their group in the first round of competition, thus failing to secure qualification for the quarter-finals. He was the only scorer.
