= Souleymane Dembélé =

Malian footballer (born 1984)

Personal information
- Full name: Souleymane Dembélé
- Date of birth: 3 September 1984 (age 42)
- Place of birth: Bamako, Mali
- Height: 1.85 m (6 ft 1 in)
- Positions: Left midfielder; winger; left back

Team information
- Current team: Stade Malien

Senior career*
Years	Team	Apps	(Gls)
2003–2005	Stade Malien	?	(?)
2005–2009	Djoliba AC	?	(?)
2009–2011	FUS de Rabat	?	(?)
2012–	Stade Malien		

International career
2004–2009	Mali	12	(0)
- * Club domestic league appearances and goals as of 29 July 2010

Souleymane Dembélé (born 3 September 1984) is a Malian football player, currently playing for Stade Malien.

== International ==
He was part of the Mali U-23 team who finish third in group stage of 2003 FIFA World Youth Championship.

Dembélé was selected for the 2008 Africa Cup of Nations. He made his debut with the senior side in a 2006 FIFA World Cup qualifying match against Liberia on 5 June 2005.
