= António Duarte =

Cape Verdean footballer (born 1967)

Toni
Personal information
- Full name: António Dinis Duarte
- Date of birth: 30 January 1967 (age 59)
- Place of birth: Praia, Cape Verde
- Height: 1.84 m (6 ft 1/2 in)
- Position: Striker

Senior career*
Years	Team	Apps	(Gls)
1988–1989	Morabeza		
1989–1990	Vianense	26	(6)
1990–1992	Rio Ave	35	(17)
1992–1993	Braga	25	(7)
1993–1994	Rio Ave	28	(15)
1994–2000	Braga	150	(30)
2000	Braga B	1	(0)
2000–2002	Santa Clara	25	(7)
2002	Portimonense	14	(0)
2002–2003	Feirense	26	(12)
2003–2004	Lousada	3	(0)
2004–2005	Merelinense		
2005–2006	Pevidém		
2006	Caçadores Taipas		
Total		333	(94)

International career
1992–2002	Cape Verde	12+	(6)
- * Club domestic league appearances and goals

António Dinis Duarte (born 30 January 1967), commonly known as Toni Dude, is a Cape Verdean former footballer who played as a striker.

== Club career ==
Born in Praia, Toni spent 17 of his 18 years as a professional in Portugal, starting out at SC Vianense in 1989. He made his Primeira Liga debut in the 1992–93 season, scoring seven goals in 14 starts to help S.C. Braga finish in 12th position.

After leaving the Minho club in 2000, aged 33, Toni went on to compete in all four major levels, appearing in seven top flight games for C.D. Santa Clara in the 2001–02 campaign. He retired in 2006, amassing totals in the latter competition of 182 matches and 37 goals.

== International career ==
Toni represented Cape Verde between 1998 and 2002, earning his first cap aged 31. Three of his six goals for the country came in the 2000 Amílcar Cabral Cup.
