= Caló (footballer) =

Cape Verdean footballer (born 1976)

Personal information
- Full name: Carlos Pedro Silva Morais
- Date of birth: 21 March 1976 (age 50)
- Place of birth: Praia, Cape Verde
- Height: 1.79 m (5 ft 10 in)
- Position: Winger

Senior career*
| Years | Team | Apps | (Gls) |
| 1996 | Académica Praia | | |
| 1996–1997 | Ovarense | | |
| 1998 | Sporting Praia | | |
| 1998–2000 | Avanca | ? | (22) |
| 2000–2002 | Salgueiros | 30 | (3) |
| 2002–2006 | Al-Ahli | ? | (26) |
| 2006–2009 | Al-Shamaal | | |
| 2010 | Santa Maria | | |
| 2011 | Sporting Praia | | |

International career
| 1995–2007 | Cape Verde | 32 | (10) |
- * Club domestic league appearances and goals

Carlos Pedro Silva Morais (born 21 March 1976), commonly known as Caló, is a Cape Verdean retired footballer who played as a left winger.

== Club career ==
Caló was born in Praia, bouncing back between clubs in his country and in the Portuguese lower leagues in his early career. In 2000 he signed for S.C. Salgueiros in the Primeira Liga of the latter nation, being sparingly used during two seasons and suffering relegation in his second.

Subsequently, Caló moved countries again, spending several years in Qatar in representation of two teams, mainly Al Ahli SC (Doha). In early 2010, aged nearly 34, he returned to his homeland, joining Sport Club Santa Maria and moving to former side Sporting Clube da Praia after a few months.

== International career ==
Caló represented Cape Verde during nine years, his debut coming in 1998. He scored one of the national team's first ever goals in a FIFA World Cup qualification match, against Swaziland on 16 November 2003 (1–1 away draw).
