= Lito (Cape Verdean footballer) =

Cape Verdean footballer (born 1975)

Personal information
- Full name: Cláudio Zélito da Fonseca Fernandes Aguiar
- Date of birth: 3 February 1975 (age 51)
- Place of birth: Pedra Badejo, Cape Verde
- Height: 1.70 m (5 ft 7 in)
- Position: Forward

Youth career
- Sporting Torre

Senior career*
Years	Team	Apps	(Gls)
1996–1998	Águias Camarate		
1998–1999	Fafe	27	(5)
1999–2000	Espinho	26	(2)
2000–2002	Imortal	61	(17)
2002–2003	Maia	33	(11)
2003–2005	Moreirense	62	(7)
2005–2007	Naval	60	(11)
2007–2010	Académica	80	(20)
2010–2011	Portimonense	22	(3)
2011–2012	Arouca	1	(0)
2012–2013	Atlético	22	(1)
2013–2014	Pinhalnovense	24	(4)
Total		418	(81)

International career
2002–2012	Cape Verde	47	(7)
- * Club domestic league appearances and goals

Cláudio Zélito da Fonseca Fernandes Aguiar (born 3 February 1975), known as Lito, is a Cape Verdean retired professional footballer who played predominantly as a forward.

He amassed Primeira Liga totals of 224 matches and 41 goals over eight seasons, representing in the competition Moreirense, Naval, Académica and Portimonense.

== Club career ==
Born in Pedra Badejo, Santiago, Lito spent his entire football career in Portugal, playing at nearly every level. He started out with Grupo Desportivo Águias de Camarate in the regional leagues of Lisbon, going on to represent AD Fafe, S.C. Espinho, Imortal D.C. and F.C. Maia.

In the 2003–04 season, at the age of 28, Lito made his Primeira Liga debut, with Moreirense FC. After suffering relegation in his second year he stayed in that level, signing for Associação Naval 1º de Maio.

Aged 32, Lito joined Académica de Coimbra, enjoying his best seasons in his first two years (a combined 17 league goals, including a hat-trick in a 3–3 home draw against C.F. Estrela da Amadora on 4 November 2007). After still being an important attacking unit in the 2009–10 campaign, again helping the Students retain their top division status, he moved to freshly promoted club Portimonense S.C. for an undisclosed fee.

Lito retired in 2014, after one-season spells with F.C. Arouca, Atlético Clube de Portugal (both in the Segunda Liga) and C.D. Pinhalnovense (third tier). He later worked as a manager, with Sporting Clube da Praia in his native island.
