= Agnidé Osséni =

Beninese footballer

Personal information
- Full name: Achirou Agnidé Ismaël Osséni
- Date of birth: 24 October 1995 (age 31)
- Place of birth: Cotonou, Benin
- Height: 1.69 m (5 ft 7 in)
- Position: Midfielder

Team information
- Current team: Soleil FC

Senior career*
Years	Team	Apps	(Gls)
- AS Oussou Saka
2016	USS Kraké		
2017–	Soleil FC		

International career
2017–	Benin	5	(0)
- * Club domestic league appearances and goals

Agnidé Osséni (born 24 October 1995) is a Beninese football midfielder who plays for Soleil FC.
