= TCG Yıldırım =

TCG Yıldırım is the name of the following ships of the Turkish Navy:

- TCG Yıldırım (P 338), ex-USS Defiance (PG-95), an Asheville-class gunboat transferred to Turkey in 1973, destroyed by an explosion in 1985
- TCG Yıldırım (F 243), a Yavuz-class frigate commissioned in 1989

== See also ==
- Yıldırım (disambiguation)
