= Saviolo =

Saviolo is a surname. Notable people with the surname include:

- Noah Saviolo (born 2004), Congolese footballer
- Vincentio Saviolo (died 1589), Italian fencing author
