= 2025–26 ES Sétif season =

ES Sétif
2025–26 season
- Owner: Sonelgaz
- Head coach: Antoine Hey (from 14 July 2025) (until 2 October 2025); Taoufik Rouabah (from 2 October 2025) (until 30 October 2025); Milutin Sredojević (from 18 November 2025) (until 15 February 2026); Lotfi Amrouche (from 15 February 2026)
- Stadium: 8 May 1945 Stadium
- Ligue 1: 10th
- Algerian Cup: Round of 16
- Top goalscorer: League: Merouane Zerrouki (9 goals); All: Merouane Zerrouki (9 goals)
- Biggest win: ES Sétif 4–1 USM Khenchela
- Biggest defeat: JS Kabylie 5–1 ES Sétif
Home colours	Away colours	Third colours

The 2025–26 season, is ES Sétif's 55th and the club's 24th consecutive season in the top flight of Algerian football. In addition to the domestic league, ES Sétif are participating in the Algerian Cup. The Algerian Professional Football League (LFP) officially released the calendar for the 2025–26 Ligue 1 Mobilis season on July 10, 2025. The Ligue 1 will kick off on Thursday, August 21, 2025, and conclude with the 30th and final matchday on May 16, 2026. As in recent years, league matches will be held every Thursday, Friday, and Saturday, offering better scheduling balance and improved logistical conditions for clubs and broadcasters.

== Review ==
=== Background ===
On June 30, 2025, ES Sétif appointed Azzedine Arab as their new sporting director. A medical doctor by training, Arab previously led the club in 2020 and served as interim president of the Algerian Football Federation in 2023. His return follows the departures of Abdelkrim Bira and Abdelmoumene Djabou. Arab is tasked with restoring stability to a struggling sports department since the club’s acquisition by Sonelgaz.

== Squad list ==
Players and squad numbers last updated on 31 January 2026.
Note: Flags indicate national team as has been defined under FIFA eligibility rules. Players may hold more than one non-FIFA nationality.

No.	Nat.	Name	Position	Date of birth (age)	Signed from
Goalkeepers
1	(Algeria)	Hatem Bencheikh El Fegoun	GK	3 November 1999 (aged 25)	(Algeria) Olympique Akbou
16	(Algeria)	Zakaria Saidi	GK	5 August 1996 (aged 29)	(Algeria) JS Saoura
30	(Algeria)	Ala Eddine Bouaoune	GK	10 November 2002 (aged 22)	(Algeria) Reserve team
Defenders
3	(Algeria)	Issam Naim	CB	21 December 2005 (aged 19)	(Algeria) CR Belouizdad
4	(Algeria)	Imadeddine Boubekeur	CB	10 July 1995 (aged 30)	(Kuwait) Al-Arabi SC
5	(Algeria)	Youcef Douar	CB	15 September 1997 (aged 27)	(Algeria) Paradou AC
12	(Algeria)	Adda Derder	RB	28 March 1998 (aged 27)	(Algeria) RC Kouba
13	(Gabon)	Mick Omfia	CB	10 December 2000 (aged 24)	(Guinea) Hafia FC
22	(Algeria)	Ibrahim Bekakchi	CB	10 January 1992 (aged 33)	(Algeria) NC Magra
26	(Algeria)	Aïssa Boudechicha	LB	13 April 2000 (aged 25)	(Algeria) MC El Bayadh
27	(Algeria)	Kamel Hamidi	RB	1 May 1996 (aged 29)	(Algeria) MC Alger
Midfielders
6	(Algeria)	Oussama Daibeche	DM	28 January 1999 (aged 26)	(Algeria) CR Belouizdad
8	(Algeria)	Mohamed Hamek	CM	28 April 1998 (aged 27)	(France) Aubagne
10	(Algeria)	Akram Djahnit	AM	3 April 1991 (aged 34)	(Algeria) USM Alger
11	(Algeria)	Kheireddine Toual	AM	4 August 2001 (aged 24)	(Algeria) USM Alger
14	(Algeria)	Abderraouf Arib	DM	16 February 2005 (aged 20)	(Algeria) Reserve team
21	(Algeria)	Hachemi Benslimane	AM	20 December 2005 (aged 19)	(Algeria) CS Constantine
29	(Ghana)	Salifu Mudasiru	DM	1 April 1997 (aged 28)	(Uzbekistan) FC Mash'al
Forwards
7	(Republic of the Congo)	Wilfrid Nkaya	RW	17 September 1999 (aged 25)	(Republic of the Congo) AS Otôho
9	(Algeria)	Mohamed Benlebna	ST	26 March 2005 (aged 20)	(Algeria) CR Belouizdad
17	(Algeria)	Mohamed Boukerma	RW	5 August 2001 (aged 24)	(Algeria) Paradou AC
19	(Ivory Coast)	Daniel Gnahoua	ST	20 December 2005 (aged 19)	(Ivory Coast) AFAD Djékanou
20	(Algeria)	Merouane Zerrouki	ST	25 January 2001 (aged 24)	(Algeria) CR Belouizdad
28	(Algeria)	Youcef Gherbi	ST	5 April 2005 (aged 20)	(Algeria) Reserve team

== Transfers ==
=== In ===
==== Summer ====
Date	Pos	Player	Moving from	Fee	Source
1 July 2025	ST	(Algeria) Mohamed Benlebna	CR Belouizdad U21	Free transfer	
16 July 2025	FW	(Algeria) Isaad Lakdja	(Lebanon) Safa SC	Free transfer	
15 July 2025	CB	(Algeria) Issam Abdelhamid Naim	CR Belouizdad U21	Free transfer	
16 July 2025	DF	(Algeria) Lahcene Bouziane	USM El Harrach	Free transfer	
16 July 2025	DF	(Algeria) Kamel Hamidi	MC Alger	Free transfer	
19 July 2025	RB	(Algeria) Adda Derder	RC Kouba	Free transfer	
20 July 2025	MF	(Algeria) Oussama Daibeche	CR Belouizdad	Free transfer	
23 July 2025	LW	(The Gambia) Gibril Sillah	(Tanzania) Azam	Free transfer	
26 July 2025	DF	(Algeria) Aïssa Boudechicha	MC El Bayadh	Free transfer	
27 July 2025	DM	(Ghana) Salifu Mudasiru	(Uzbekistan) FC Mash'al	Free transfer	
27 July 2025	AM	(Algeria) Hachemi Benslimane	CS Constantine U21	Free transfer	
31 July 2025	LW	(Rwanda) Abeddy Biramahire	(Rwanda) Rayon Sports	Undisclosed	

==== Winteer ====
Date	Pos	Player	Moving from	Fee	Source
16 January 2026	GK	(Algeria) Hatem Bencheikh El Fegoun	Olympique Akbou	Loan	
28 January 2026	CB	(Gabon) Mick Omfia	(Guinea) Hafia FC	Undisclosed	
28 January 2026	RW	(Republic of the Congo) Wilfrid Nkaya	(Republic of the Congo) AS Otôho	Undisclosed	
28 January 2026	ST	(Ivory Coast) Daniel Gnahoua	(Ivory Coast) AFAD Djékanou	Undisclosed	
31 January 2026	CM	(Algeria) Mohamed Hamek	(France) Aubagne	Undisclosed	

=== Out ===
==== Summer ====
Date	Pos	Player	Moving to	Fee	Source
19 July 2025	DM	(Algeria) Taher Benkhelifa	Unattached	Free transfer (Released)	
19 July 2025	DM	(Algeria) Bassem Mechaar	Unattached	Free transfer (Released)	
19 July 2025	ST	(Algeria) Karim Bouhmidi	Unattached	Free transfer (Released)	
19 July 2025	RB	(Algeria) Mohamed Imad Reguieg	Unattached (Note: Reguieg joined Paradou AC on 12 August 2025.)	Free transfer (Released)	
19 July 2025	FW	(Algeria) Abdelmouine Ferdjioui	Unattached	Free transfer (Released)	
26 July 2025	AM	(Burkina Faso) Clément Pitroipa	Unattached	Free transfer (Released)	
26 July 2025	LW	(Algeria) Mohamed Messaoud Salem	Unattached	Free transfer (Released)	
3 August 2025	ST	(Nigeria) Kingsley Eduwo	Unattached	Free transfer (Released)	
3 August 2025	RB	(Algeria) Oussama Gattal	Unattached	Free transfer (Released)	
7 August 2025	SS	(Algeria) Abderrahmane Bacha	Unattached	Free transfer (Released)	

==== Winter ====
Date	Pos	Player	Moving to	Fee	Source
5 January 2026	CB	(Algeria) Lahcene Bouziane	Unattached	Free transfer (Released)	
5 January 2026	LB	(Algeria) Houari Ferhani	Unattached	Free transfer (Released)	
5 January 2026	RW	(Algeria) Issad Lakdja	Unattached	Free transfer (Released)	
5 January 2026	LW	(The Gambia) Gibril Sillah	Unattached	Free transfer (Released)	
5 January 2026	ST	(Rwanda) Abeddy Biramahire	Unattached	Free transfer (Released)	
21 January 2026	AM	(Algeria) Salah Bouchama	(Egypt) NBE SC	170,000 €	
22 January 2026	GK	(Algeria) Tarek Bousseder	CR Belouizdad	Free transfer	

== Pre-season and friendlies ==
8 August 2025 Friendly	ES Sétif	4–3	ASO Chlef	Aïn Draham, Tunisia
17:00 UTC+1	Abeddy; Lakdja	Report	Agbagno; Ledlum	Stadium: Complexe sportif Hammam Bourguiba

== Competitions ==
=== Overview ===
Competition	Record								Started round	Final position / round	First match	Last match
Competition	G	W	D	L	GF	GA	GD	Win %	Started round	Final position / round	First match	Last match
Ligue 1	30	10	9	11	33	36	−3	33.33	—N/a	11th	23 August 2025	5 June 2026
Algerian Cup	3	2	0	1	6	2	+4	66.67	Round of 64	Round of 16	6 December 2025	16 January 2026
Total	33	12	9	12	39	38	+1	36.36				

Updated to match played 5 June 2026
Source: Competitions

=== Ligue 1 ===
==== League table ====
Pos	Team	Pld	W	D	L	GF	GA	GD	Pts	Qualification or relegation
9	CS Constantine	30	11	10	9	35	30	+5	43	
10	USM Alger (Note: USM Alger qualified for the 2026–27 CAF Confederation Cup by winning the 2025–26 Algerian Cup)	30	8	15	7	34	29	+5	39	Qualification for CAF Confederation Cup
11	ES Sétif	30	10	9	11	33	36	−3	39	
12	MB Rouissat	30	9	9	12	30	35	−5	36	
13	ASO Chlef	30	9	7	14	26	31	−5	34	

Source: lfp.dz
Rules for classification: 1) Points; 2) Head-to-head points; 3) Head-to-head goal difference; 4) First half goal difference; 5) First half total goals; 6) Fairplay ranking; 7) Playoff.

==== Results summary ====
Overall								Home						Away					
Pld	W	D	L	GF	GA	GD	Pts	W	D	L	GF	GA	GD	W	D	L	GF	GA	GD
30	10	9	11	33	36	−3	39	8	6	1	26	13	+13	2	3	10	7	23	−16

Last updated: 5 June 2026.
Source: Competitive matches

==== Results by round ====
Round	1	2	3	4	5	6	7	8	9	10	11	12	13	14	15	16	17	18	19	20	21	22	23	24	25	26	27	28	29	30
Ground	A	H	A	H	A	A	H	A	H	A	H	A	H	A	H	H	A	H	A	H	H	A	H	A	H	A	H	A	H	A
Result	D	D	D	W	L	L	D	L	L	W	D	D	W	L	D	W	L	D	L	W	W	L	W	L	D	L	W	L	W	W
Position	7	10	9	8	9	14	14	14	14	13	12	13	12	13	13	12	12	12	13	12	12	12	12	12	13	13	12	13	12	

Updated to match(es) played on 5 June 2026. Source: Competitive matches
A = Away; H = Home; W = Win; D = Draw; L = Loss

==== Matches ====
The league fixtures were announced on 31 July 2025.

All times are local, WAT (UTC+1).

Win Draw Loss Postponed

23 August 2025 Round 1	USM Khenchela	1–1	ES Sétif	Khenchela
17:00	Bakir 20'	Soccerway; LFP	Hamidi 41'	Stadium: Amar Hamam Stadium; Referee: Rafik Aouina

29 August 2025 Round 2	ES Sétif	1–1	JS Saoura	Sétif
19:00	Biramahire 52' (pen.)	Soccerway; LFP	Wayou 65'	Stadium: 8 May 1945 Stadium; Attendance: 0 (close doors); Referee: Akram Mechairia

5 September 2025 Round 3	MC El Bayadh	1–1	ES Sétif	El Bayadh
17:00	El Orfi 46'	Soccerway; LFP	Zerrouki 33'	Stadium: Zakaria Medjdoub Stadium; Referee: Yahia Dehar

11 September 2025 Round 4	ES Sétif	2–1	CS Constantine	Sétif
17:45	Zerrouki 49', 69'	Soccerway; LFP	Tahar 22'	Stadium: 8 May 1945 Stadium; Referee: Youcef Taieb Bouderbal

19 September 2025 Round 5	MB Rouissat	3–0	ES Sétif	Ouargla
20:00	Nezla 5'; Merzougui 71', 87'	Soccerway; LFP		Stadium: 18 February Stadium; Referee: Anes Azrine

29 September 2025 Round 6	ES Mostaganem	1–0	ES Sétif	Mostaganem
18:00	Toumi 17'	Soccerway; LFP		Stadium: Mohamed Bensaïd Stadium; Referee: Smail Hamlat; VAR: Alaa Bouab

4 October 2025 Round 7	ES Sétif	1–1	ASO Chlef	Sétif
16:00	Zerrouki 49'	Soccerway; LFP	Hassen Khodja 52'	Stadium: 8 May 1945 Stadium; Referee: Abdelali Ibrir; VAR: Redouane Allou

29 October 2025 Round 9	ES Sétif	1–3	USM Alger	Sétif
18:00	Djahnit 62' (pen.)	Soccerway; LFP	Benzaza 19'; Draoui 21'; Bousseliou 82'	Stadium: 8 May 1945 Stadium; Referee: Mustapha Ghorbal

2 November 2025 Round 10	ES Ben Aknoun	0–1	ES Sétif	Belouizdad
14:30		Soccerway; LFP	Djahnit 90+4'	Stadium: 20 August 1955 Stadium; Referee: Houssam Benyahia

8 November 2025 Round 11	ES Sétif	1–1	Olympique Akbou	Sétif
18:00	Boubekeur 47'	Soccerway; LFP	Benamrane 85'	Stadium: 8 May 1945 Stadium; Referee: Anes Azrine

20 November 2025 Round 12	MC Oran	0–0	ES Sétif	Bir El Djir
19:00		Soccerway; LFP		Stadium: Miloud Hadefi Stadium; Referee: Yahia Dahar

19 December 2025 Round 13	ES Sétif	1–0	JS Kabylie	Sétif
18:00	Boubekeur 47'	Soccerway; LFP		Stadium: 8 May 1945 Stadium; Referee: Rafik Aouina

25 December 2025 Round 8	CR Belouizdad	3–1	ES Sétif	Algiers
19:30	Laouafi 63'; Boussouar 76'; Ben Hammouda 90+2'	Soccerway; LFP	Djahnit 85' (pen.)	Stadium: Stade du 5 Juillet; Referee: Youcef Tayeb Bouderbal

29 December 2025 Round 14	MC Alger	2–0	ES Sétif	Douéra
19:30	Ferhat 47'; Bangoura 57' (pen.)	Soccerway; LFP		Stadium: Ali La Pointe Stadium; Referee: Haitham Ghouti

8 January 2026 Round 15	ES Sétif	2–2	Paradou AC	Sétif
17:45	Zerrouki 9', 51'	Soccerway; LFP	Abdelkader 60'; Guidoum 84'	Stadium: 8 May 1945 Stadium; Referee: Akram Mechairia

23 January 2026 Round 16	ES Sétif	4–1	USM Khenchela	Sétif
18:00	Djahnit 2'; Hamidi 8'; Zerrouki 41'; Toual 62'	Soccerway; LFP	Bakir 50'	Stadium: 8 May 1945 Stadium; Referee: Nabil Boukhalfa

4 February 2026 Round 17	JS Saoura	1–0	ES Sétif	Béchar
16:00	Boutiche 76' (pen.)	Soccerway; LFP		Stadium: 20 August 1955 Stadium; Referee: Mohamed Chaoubi

8 February 2026 Round 18	ES Sétif	0–0	MC El Bayadh	Sétif
18:00		Soccerway; LFP		Stadium: 8 May 1945 Stadium; Referee: Anes Azrine

13 February 2026 Round 19	CS Constantine	2–0	ES Sétif	Constantine
17:00	L'Ghoul 69', 76'	Soccerway; LFP		Stadium: Chahid Hamlaoui Stadium; Referee: Alaa Bouab

20 February 2026 Round 20	ES Sétif	2–1	MB Rouissat	Sétif
22:00	Toual 10'; Benlebna 67'	Soccerway; LFP	Belaribi 44'	Stadium: 8 May 1945 Stadium; Referee: Lahlou Benbraham

28 February 2026 Round 21	ES Sétif	3–0	ES Mostaganem	Sétif
22:00	Boukerma 62' (pen.); Zerrouki 69'; Hamidi 90+4'	Soccerway; LFP		Stadium: 8 May 1945 Stadium; Referee: Haitham Ghouti

6 March 2026 Round 22	ASO Chlef	2–1	ES Sétif	Chlef
22:00	Avotor 78'	Soccerway; LFP		Stadium: Mohamed Boumezrag Stadium; Referee: Yahia Dahar

18 March 2026 Round 24	USM Alger	2–0	ES Sétif	Algiers
22:00	Mahrouz 9'; Dehiri 34'	Soccerway; LFP		Stadium: Stade du 5 Juillet; Referee: Nabil Boukhalfa

5 April 2026 Round 25	ES Sétif	1–1	ES Ben Aknoun	Sétif
17:45	Boubekeur 14'	Soccerway; LFP	Djabout 12'	Stadium: 8 May 1945 Stadium; Referee: Lahlou Benbraham

11 April 2026 Round 26	Olympique Akbou	1–0	ES Sétif	Béjaïa
15:00	Hamroune 82'	Soccerway; LFP		Stadium: Maghrebi Unity Stadium; Referee: Tayeb Benyabka

17 April 2026 Round 27	ES Sétif	3–0	MC Oran	Sétif
17:45	Boukerma 45+4', 57'; Hamek 70'	Soccerway; LFP		Stadium: 8 May 1945 Stadium; Referee: Alaa Bouab

8 May 2026 Round 28	JS Kabylie	5–1	ES Sétif	Tizi Ouzou
17:45	Izem 27'; Mahious 43', 62', 81'; Messaoudi 68'	Soccerway; LFP	Hamek 90'	Stadium: Hocine Aït Ahmed Stadium; Referee: Mehdi Oukil

16 May 2026 Round 23	ES Sétif	3–1	CR Belouizdad	Sétif
18:00	Boubekeur 11'; Hamek 26'; Toual 43'	Soccerway; LFP	Laouafi 18'	Stadium: 8 May 1945 Stadium; Referee: Zine El Abidine Dekhane

20 May 2026 Round 29	ES Sétif	1–0	MC Alger	Sétif
17:45	Zerrouki 44'	Soccerway; LFP		Stadium: 8 May 1945 Stadium; Referee: Abdelali Ibrir

5 June 2026 Round 30	Paradou AC	0–2	ES Sétif	Belouizdad
17:00		Soccerway; LFP	Benlebna 2', 52'	Stadium: 20 August 1955 Stadium; Referee: Tahar Boudjemaa

=== Algerian Cup ===
6 December 2025 Round of 64	ES Sétif	1–0	CRB Beni Tamou	Sétif
17:00	Hamidi 5'	Report		Stadium: 8 May 1945 Stadium; Referee: Ayoub Belhachemi

12 December 2025 Round of 32	US Béchar Djedid	0–4	ES Sétif	Béchar
14:30		Report	Biramahire 6'; Djahnit 29'; Hamidi 77'; Bouchama 85'	Stadium: 20 August 1955 Stadium; Referee: Abderahmane Mohamed Belkebir

16 January 2026 Round of 16	CS Constantine	2–1 (a.e.t.)	ES Sétif	Constantine
16:00	Dib 45+7'; Bouzekri 111'	Report	Hamidi 19'	Stadium: Chahid Hamlaoui Stadium; Referee: Fateh Harkat

== Squad information ==
=== Appearances and goals ===
As of 5 June 2026

No.	Pos	Player	Nat	Ligue 1			Algerian Cup			Total		
No.	Pos	Player	Nat	App	St	G	App	St	G	App	St	G
Goalkeepers
1	GK	Hatem Bencheikh El Fegoun	(Algeria)	4	3	0	1	1	0	5	4	0
16	GK	Zakaria Saidi	(Algeria)	22	22	0	0	0	0	22	22	0
30	GK	Ala Eddine Bouaoune	(Algeria)	1	0	0	0	0	0	1	0	0
Defenders
3	CB	Issam Naim	(Algeria)	16	13	0	3	2	0	19	15	0
4	CB	Imadeddine Boubekeur	(Algeria)	25	25	4	3	3	0	28	28	4
5	CB	Youcef Douar	(Algeria)	21	17	0	2	2	0	23	19	0
12	RB	Adda Derder	(Algeria)	14	3	0	1	1	0	15	4	0
13	CB	Mick Omfia	(Gabon)	11	10	0	0	0	0	11	10	0
22	CB	Ibrahim Bekakchi	(Algeria)	13	7	0	1	0	0	14	7	0
26	LB	Aïssa Boudechicha	(Algeria)	26	22	0	3	2	0	29	24	0
27	RB	Kamel Hamidi	(Algeria)	25	25	3	3	3	3	28	28	6
Midfielders
6	DM	Oussama Daibeche	(Algeria)	22	22	0	3	3	0	25	25	0
8	CM	Mohamed Hamek	(Algeria)	13	11	3	0	0	0	13	11	3
10	AM	Akram Djahnit	(Algeria)	20	17	4	3	3	1	23	20	5
11	AM	Kheireddine Toual	(Algeria)	28	22	3	3	3	0	31	25	3
14	DM	Abderraouf Arib	(Algeria)	0	0	0	1	0	0	1	0	0
21	AM	Hachemi Benslimane	(Algeria)	2	1	0	0	0	0	2	1	0
29	DM	Salifu Mudasiru	(Ghana)	21	19	0	1	1	0	22	20	0
54	AM	Abderrahmane Boungab	(Algeria)	1	0	0	1	0	0	2	0	0
Forwards
7	RW	Wilfrid Nkaya	(Republic of the Congo)	10	4	0	0	0	0	10	4	0
9	ST	Mohamed Benlebna	(Algeria)	13	1	3	1	0	0	14	1	3
17	RW	Mohamed Boukerma	(Algeria)	20	7	3	3	0	0	23	7	3
19	ST	Daniel Gnahoua	(Ivory Coast)	11	2	0	0	0	0	11	2	0
20	ST	Merouane Zerrouki	(Algeria)	26	23	9	3	2	0	29	25	9
28	ST	Youcef Gherbi	(Algeria)	4	0	0	2	0	0	6	0	0
41	ST	Oussama Bouguerri	(Algeria)	10	0	0	0	0	0	10	0	0
57	ST	Imadeddine Bouchagoura	(Algeria)	4	1	0	0	0	0	4	1	0
Players transferred out during the season
~~8~~	LB	Houari Ferhani	(Algeria)	11	10	0	1	1	0	12	11	0
~~15~~	CB	Lahcene Bouziane	(Algeria)	2	1	0	0	0	0	2	1	0
~~18~~	RW	Issad Lakdja	(Algeria)	7	6	0	0	0	0	7	6	0
~~19~~	LW	Gibril Sillah	(The Gambia)	13	13	0	2	2	0	15	15	0
~~23~~	LW	Abeddy Biramahire	(Rwanda)	10	3	1	2	1	1	12	2	2
~~1~~	GK	Tarek Bousseder	(Algeria)	5	5	0	2	2	0	7	7	0
~~7~~	AM	Salah Bouchama	(Algeria)	10	6	0	2	1	1	12	7	1
Total				30		33	3		6	33		39

Last updated: 5 June 2026
Source: soccerway.com

=== Goalscorers ===
As of 5 June 2026

Includes all competitive matches.

No.	Nat.	Player	Pos.	L1	AC	TOTAL
20	(Algeria)	Merouane Zerrouki	ST	9	0	9
27	(Algeria)	Kamel Hamidi	RB	3	3	6
10	(Algeria)	Akram Djahnit	AM	4	1	5
4	(Algeria)	Imadeddine Boubekeur	CB	4	0	4
17	(Algeria)	Mohamed Boukerma	RW	3	0	3
11	(Algeria)	Kheireddine Toual	AM	3	0	3
8	(Algeria)	Mohamed Hamek	CM	3	0	3
9	(Algeria)	Mohamed Benlebna	ST	3	0	3
Players transferred out during the season
~~23~~	(Rwanda)	Abeddy Biramahire	LW	1	1	2
~~7~~	(Algeria)	Salah Bouchama	AM	0	1	1
Own Goals				0	0	0
Totals				33	6	39

=== Clean sheets ===
As of 5 June 2026

Includes all competitive matches.

					Clean sheets		
No.	Nat	Name	GP	GA	L 1	AC	Total
1	(Algeria)	Hatem Bencheikh El Fegoun	5	8	2	0	2
16	(Algeria)	Zakaria Saidi	22	23	6	0	6
30	(Algeria)	Ala Eddine Bouaoune	0	0	0	0	0
Players transferred out during the season
~~1~~	(Algeria)	Tarek Bousseder	7	7	1	2	3
		TOTALS		38	9	2	11
