= Yıldırım =

Yıldırım is a Turkish name and surname meaning "lightning". It may refer to:

== People ==
=== Given name ===
- Ali Yıldırım Koç (born 1967), Turkish businessman and member of the Koç family
- Yıldırım Akbulut (1935–2021), Turkish politician
- Yıldırım Aktuna (1930–2007), Turkish psychiatrist and politician
- Yıldırım Demirören (born 1964), Turkish businessman and president of Turkish Football Federation

=== Surname ===
- Adem Yıldırım (born 1973), Turkish politician
- Adnan Yıldırım (1957–1994), Turkish person involved in the Susurluk scandal
- Ahmet Doğan Yıldırım (born 2006), Turkish football goalkeeper
- Ahmet Yıldırım (born 1974), Turkish football manager and former midfielder
- Avni Yıldırım (born 1991), Turkish boxer
- Aygün Yıldırım (born 1995), German footballer
- Aziz Yıldırım (born 1952), Turkish businessman and former chairman of Fenerbahçe S.K.
- Bahar Yıldırım (born 1998), Turkish female long-distance runner
- Binali Yıldırım (born 1955), Turkish politician and prime minister from May 2016 to July 2018
- Bülent Yıldırım (referee) (born 1972), Turkish football referee
- Cemal Yıldırım (1925–2009), Turkish philosopher of science
- Cem Yıldırım (born 1961), Turkish mathematician
- Elif Yıldırım (born 1990), Turkish female middle-distance runner
- Enver Yıldırım (born 1995), Turkish fencer
- Erman Yıldırım (born 1986), Turkish footballer
- Serkan Yıldırım (born 1991), Turkish para-athlete
- Sezen Aksu (Fatma Sezen Yıldırım) (born 1954), Turkish singer, songwriter and producer
- Fatoş Yıldırım (born 1994), Turkish women's footballer
- Fehmi Bülent Yıldırım (born 1966), Turkish NGO leader
- Gülser Yıldırım (born 1963) Turkish-Kurdish politician
- Haluk Yıldırım (born 1972), Turkish basketball player
- Hüseyin Yıldırım (born 1928), convicted Turkish spy of the Cold War era
- Irmak Yıldırım (born 2005), Turkish female motocross racer
- Kaan Yıldırım (born 1986), Turkish actor
- Mahmut Yıldırım (born 1953), Turkish Olympian contract killer
- Mithat Yıldırım (born 1966), Turkish cross-country skier
- Murat Yıldırım (actor) (born 1979), Turkish actor
- Murat Yıldırım (footballer) (born 1987), Dutch footballer of Turkish descent
- Özkan Yıldırım (born 1993), German footballer
- Ramazan Yıldırım (born 1975), Turkish footballer and manager
- Rıza Yıldırım (born 1987), Turkish wrestler
- Rukiye Yıldırım (born 1991), Turkish female taekwondo practitioner
- Selma Yildirim (born 1969), Austrian politician
- Sercan Yıldırım (born 1990), Turkish footballer
- Uğur Yıldırım (born 1982), Dutch footballer of Turkish descent

=== Nickname ===
- Bayezid I (1354–1403), "Yıldırım Bayezid", Ottoman sultan

== Places ==
- Yıldırım, Bursa, a metropolitan district in the center of Bursa, Turkey
- Yıldırım, Yenişehir, Turkey
- Milia, Famagusta (Turkish: Yıldırım), Northern Cyprus
- Yıldırım railway station, a commuter rail station in Ankara, Turkey

== Other uses ==
- J-600T Yıldırım, a conventional battlefield ballistic missile system of Turkey
- Yıldırım Bosna S.K., a football club in Istanbul, Turkey
- Yıldırım Army Group, army group of the Ottoman Empire during World War I
