= 2026–27 Trabzonspor season =

Trabzonspor
2026–27 season
- President: Ertuğrul Doğan
- Head coach: Fatih Tekke (until 1 September); Hüseyin Çimşir (caretaker, from 1 to 17 September); Thomas Reis (from 17 September)
- Stadium: Şenol Güneş Sports Complex
- Süper Lig: 4th
- Turkish Cup: Fifth round
- Turkish Super Cup: Semi-finals
- UEFA Europa League: Play-off round
- UEFA Conference League: League phase
- Top goalscorer: League: Mohamed Salah (8); All: Mohamed Salah (10)
Home colours	Away colours	Third colours

The 2026–27 season is the 60th season in the history of Trabzonspor and the club's 53rd consecutive season in the Süper Lig. In addition to the domestic league, the club is participating in the Turkish Cup, the Turkish Super Cup, the UEFA Europa League, and the UEFA Conference League.

== Squad ==
Note: Flags indicate national team as defined under FIFA eligibility rules; some limited exceptions apply. Players may hold more than one non-FIFA nationality.

No.	Pos.	Nation	Player
1	GK	TUR	Ahmet Doğan Yıldırım
3	MF	FRA	Batista Mendy
4	DF	TUR	Samet Akaydin
5	MF	TUR	Okay Yokuşlu
6	MF	BRA	Fabinho
7	MF	ALB	Ernest Muçi
8	MF	MAR	Benjamin Bouchouari
9	FW	GBS	Franculino
10	FW	EGY	Mohamed Salah
11	MF	TUR	Ozan Tufan
14	FW	TUR	Umut Nayir
15	DF	MNE	Stefan Savić (captain)
17	MF	UKR	Ruslan Malinovskyi
19	MF	TUR	Mustafa Eskihellaç
20	DF	CPV	Wagner Pina

No.	Pos.	Nation	Player
24	GK	CMR	André Onana (on loan from Manchester United)
25	GK	TUR	Onuralp Çevikkan
26	MF	FRA	Tim Jabol-Folcarelli
27	DF	NGR	Chibuike Nwaiwu
30	FW	NGR	Paul Onuachu
39	DF	TUR	Cenk Özkacar
44	DF	UKR	Arseniy Batahov
55	DF	CPV	Sidny Lopes Cabral
57	MF	TUR	Melih Kabasakal
58	FW	TUR	Aral Şimşir
61	MF	TUR	Cihan Çanak
70	FW	POR	Noah Saviolo
77	MF	TUR	Metehan Mimaroğlu
96	GK	TUR	Erol Can Çolak
99	MF	TUR	Ali Habeşoğlu

== Transfers ==
=== In ===
Date	Pos.	Player	From	Fee	Notes	Ref.
8 June 2026	DF	(Cape Verde) Sidny Lopes Cabral	(Portugal) Benfica	€10 million		
5 June 2026	MF	(Ukraine) Ruslan Malinovskyi	(Italy) Genoa	Free		
8 June 2026	MF	(Portugal) Noah Saviolo	(Portugal) Vitória	€8.5 million	Includes €3 million in potential add-ons	
1 July 2026	MF	(Turkey) Melih Kabasakal	(Turkey) Gaziantep	Undisclosed		
1 July 2026	DF	(Turkey) Samet Akaydin	Unattached	Free		
3 July 2026	GK	(Cameroon) Andre Onana	(England) Manchester United	Loan		
8 July 2026	MF	(Turkey) Aral Şimşir	(Denmark) Midtjylland	€13 million		
18 July 2026	DF	(Turkey) Cenk Özkacar	(Spain) Valencia	Undisclosed		
29 July 2026	FW	(Belgium) René Mitongo	(Belgium) Standard Liège	€3 million		
6 August 2026	FW	(Egypt) Mohamed Salah	Unattached	Free		
24 August 2026	MF	(Brazil) Fabinho	Unattached	Free		

== Competitions ==
=== Overall record ===
Competition	First match	Last match	Starting round	Final position	Record							
Competition	First match	Last match	Starting round	Final position	Pld	W	D	L	GF	GA	GD	Win %
Süper Lig	15 August 2026	TBD	Matchday 1	TBD	6	3	1	2	13	5	+8	50.00
Turkish Cup	December 2026	TBD	Fifth round	TBD	0	0	0	0	0	0	+0	—
Turkish Super Cup	TBD	TBD	Semi-finals	TBD	0	0	0	0	0	0	+0	—
UEFA Europa League	20 August 2026	27 August 2026	Play-off round	Play-off round	2	0	0	2	0	5	−5	0.00
UEFA Conference League	15 October 2026	TBD	League phase	TBD	0	0	0	0	0	0	+0	—
Total					8	3	1	4	13	10	+3	37.50

Last updated: 20 September 2026
Source: Soccerway

=== Süper Lig ===
==== League table ====
Pos	Team	Pld	W	D	L	GF	GA	GD	Pts	Qualification or relegation
1	Galatasaray	9	7	1	1	19	12	+7	22	Qualification for the Champions League league phase
2	Amedspor	9	6	2	1	20	10	+10	20	Qualification for the Champions League third qualifying round
3	Trabzonspor	9	6	1	2	22	8	+14	19	Qualification for the Europa League second qualifying round
4	Beşiktaş	9	6	0	3	18	10	+8	18	Qualification for the Conference League second qualifying round
5	Fenerbahçe	9	5	1	3	23	8	+15	16	

Updated to match(es) played on 26 October 2026. Source: Süper Lig
Rules for classification: 1) Points; 2) Head-to-head points; 3) Head-to-head goal difference; 4) Head-to-head goals scored; 5) Goal difference; 6) Goals scored; 7) Play-off.
(Note: Head-to-head record is used only after all the matches between the teams in question have been played)

==== Results summary ====
Overall								Home						Away					
Pld	W	D	L	GF	GA	GD	Pts	W	D	L	GF	GA	GD	W	D	L	GF	GA	GD
9	6	1	2	22	8	+14	19	4	0	0	13	1	+12	2	1	2	9	7	+2

Last updated: 25 October 2026.
Source: Turkish Football Federation

==== Results by round ====
Round	1	2	3	4	5	6	7	8	9	10	11	12	13	14	15	16	17	18	19	20	21	22	23	24	25	26	27	28	29	30	31	32	33	34
Ground	A	H	A	H	A	H	A	H	A	H	A	H	A	H	A	H	A	H	A	H	A	H	A	H	A	H	A	H	A	H	A	H	A	H
Result	D	W	L	W	L	W	W	W	W																									
Position	12	4	9	4	9	7	5	5	3																									
Points	1	4	4	7	7	10	13	16	19																									

Updated to match(es) played on 19 September 2026. Source: Turkish Football Federation
A = Away; H = Home; W = Win; D = Draw; L = Loss; P = Postponed

==== Matches ====
15 August 2026 1	Kasımpaşa	1–1	Trabzonspor	Istanbul
19:00 TRT	Baldursson (yellow card) 10'; Benedyczak 56' (pen.); Ben Ouanes (yellow card) 68'	Report	Saviolo 43'	Stadium: Recep Tayyip Erdoğan Stadium; Referee: Gürcan Hasova

23 August 2026 2	Trabzonspor	2–1	Başakşehir	Trabzon
19:00 TRT	Salah 8', 48', (yellow card) 79'; Nwaiwu (yellow card) 83'; Savić (yellow card) 89'	Report	Shomurodov 19' (pen.); Kemen (yellow card) 22'; Yıldırım (yellow card) 39'; Selke (yellow card) 61'; Ergün (yellow card) 89'	Stadium: Şenol Güneş Sports Complex; Attendance: 36,316; Referee: Ali Sansalan

31 August 2026 3	Amedspor	2–1	Trabzonspor	Diyarbakır
21:30 TRT	Diagne (penalty missed) 45+5'; Sor 45+5'; Ballet (yellow card) 75'; Meraş (yellow card) 84'; Soyalp (yellow card) 85'; Orban 90', (yellow card) 90+2'; Krasniqi (yellow card) 90+9'	Report	Salah 11'; Cabral (yellow card) 39'; Nwaiwu (yellow card) 44'	Stadium: Diyarbakır Stadium; Attendance: 906; Referee: Atilla Karaoğlan

6 September 2026 4	Trabzonspor	5–0	Gençlerbirliği	Trabzon
19:00 TRT	Onuachu 5', 22'; Salah 14' (pen.); Fabinho (yellow card) 19'; Muçi (yellow card) 35', (goal) 59'; Nwaiwu (yellow card) 72'; Franculino 78'	Report	Diabaté (yellow card) 3'	Stadium: Şenol Güneş Sports Complex; Attendance: 34,821; Referee: Çağdaş Altay

12 September 2026 5	Konyaspor	1–0	Trabzonspor	Konya
20:00 TRT	Tóth 2'; Türüç (yellow card) 45+2'; İbrahimoğlu (yellow card) 85'; Awaziem (yellow card) 89'	Report	Şimşir (yellow card) 58'; Eskihellaç (yellow card) 59'; Onana (yellow card) 83'	Stadium: Konya Metropolitan Municipality Stadium; Referee: Reşat Onur Coşkunses

20 September 2026 6	Trabzonspor	4–0	Galatasaray	Trabzon
TRT	Salah 4', 44', 80', (yellow card) 82'; Saviolo 39'; Muçi (yellow card) 48'; Savić (yellow card) 71'; Onana (yellow card) 82'	Report	Ugochukwu (red card) 87'; Sané (yellow card) 90+3'	Stadium: Şenol Güneş Sports Complex; Referee: Batuhan Kolak

11 October 2026 7	Samsunspor	0–3	Trabzonspor	Samsun
TRT	Tómasson (yellow card) 7'; Watt (yellow card) 44'	Report	Muçi 27'; Nwaiwu 38'; Djú 40'; Kabasakal (red card) 43'	Stadium: Samsun 19 May Stadium; Referee: Oğuzhan Çakır

18 October 2026 8	Trabzonspor	2–0	Beşiktaş	Trabzon
TRT	Tufan 21'; Fabinho (yellow card) 33'; Salah 71'	Report	Miretti (yellow card) 32'; Topçu (yellow card) 60'; Fakılı (yellow card) 85'; Ouattara (yellow card) 90'	Stadium: Şenol Güneş Sports Complex; Referee: Cihan Aydın

25 October 2026 9	Çaykur Rizespor	3–4	Trabzonspor	Rize
TRT	Borrelli 12', 32', (yellow card) 60'; Ariss (yellow card) 14'; Laçi 68'	Report	Fabinho (yellow card) 38'; Kabasakal 49', (yellow card) 55'; Şimşir 51'; Djú 57', 83'	Stadium: Rize City Stadium; Referee: Halil Umut Meler

1 November 2026 10	Trabzonspor	2–0	Gaziantep	Trabzon
TRT	Savić 45+2'; Muçi 61'	Report	Bacuna (yellow card) 60'	Stadium: Şenol Güneş Sports Complex; Referee: Abdullah Buğra Taşkınsoy

8 November 2026 11	Alanyaspor	–	Trabzonspor	Alanya
TRT		Report		Stadium: Alanya Oba Stadium

22 November 2026 12	Trabzonspor	–	Eyüpspor	Trabzon
TRT		Report		Stadium: Şenol Güneş Sports Complex

29 November 2026 13	Göztepe	–	Trabzonspor	Göztepe
TRT		Report		Stadium: Gürsel Aksel Stadium

6 December 2026 14	Trabzonspor	–	Çorum	Trabzon
TRT		Report		Stadium: Şenol Güneş Sports Complex

13 December 2026 15	Fenerbahçe	–	Trabzonspor	Istanbul
TRT		Report		Stadium: Şükrü Saracoğlu Stadium

20 December 2026 16	Trabzonspor	–	Kocaelispor	Trabzon
TRT		Report		Stadium: Şenol Güneş Sports Complex

17 January 2027 17	Erzurumspor	–	Trabzonspor	Erzurum
TRT		Report		Stadium: Kazım Karabekir Stadium

24 January 2027 18	Trabzonspor	–	Kasımpaşa	Trabzon
TRT		Report		Stadium: Şenol Güneş Sports Complex

31 January 2027 19	Başakşehir	–	Trabzonspor	Istanbul
TRT		Report		Stadium: Başakşehir Fatih Terim Stadium

7 February 2027 20	Trabzonspor	–	Amedspor	Trabzon
TRT		Report		Stadium: Şenol Güneş Sports Complex

14 February 2027 21	Gençlerbirliği	–	Trabzonspor	Ankara
TRT		Report		Stadium: Eryaman Stadium

21 February 2027 22	Trabzonspor	–	Konyaspor	Trabzon
TRT		Report		Stadium: Şenol Güneş Sports Complex

28 February 2027 23	Galatasaray	–	Trabzonspor	Istanbul
TRT		Report		Stadium: Rams Park

7 March 2027 24	Trabzonspor	–	Samsunspor	Trabzon
TRT		Report		Stadium: Şenol Güneş Sports Complex

14 March 2027 25	Beşiktaş	–	Trabzonspor	Istanbul
TRT		Report		Stadium: Beşiktaş Stadium

21 March 2027 26	Trabzonspor	–	Çaykur Rizespor	Trabzon
TRT		Report		Stadium: Şenol Güneş Sports Complex

4 April 2027 27	Gaziantep	–	Trabzonspor	Gaziantep
TRT		Report		Stadium: Gaziantep Stadium

11 April 2027 28	Trabzonspor	–	Alanyaspor	Trabzon
TRT		Report		Stadium: Şenol Güneş Sports Complex

18 April 2027 29	Eyüpspor	–	Trabzonspor	Istanbul
TRT		Report		Stadium: Recep Tayyip Erdoğan Stadium

25 April 2027 30	Trabzonspor	–	Göztepe	Trabzon
TRT		Report		Stadium: Şenol Güneş Sports Complex

2 May 2027 31	Çorum	–	Trabzonspor	Çorum
TRT		Report		Stadium: Çorum City Stadium

9 May 2027 32	Trabzonspor	–	Fenerbahçe	Trabzon
TRT		Report		Stadium: Şenol Güneş Sports Complex

16 May 2027 33	Kocaelispor	–	Trabzonspor	İzmit
TRT		Report		Stadium: Kocaeli Stadium

23 May 2027 34	Trabzonspor	–	Erzurumspor	Trabzon
TRT		Report		Stadium: Şenol Güneş Sports Complex

=== Turkish Cup ===
	–
TRT

=== Turkish Super Cup ===
	–
TRT

=== UEFA Europa League ===
==== Play-off round ====
20 August 2026 First leg	Trabzonspor (Turkey)	0–1	(Hungary) Ferencváros	Trabzon, Turkey
20:00 TRT	Nwaiwu (red card) 90+6'	Report	Zachariassen 17', (yellow card) 43'; Yusuf (yellow card) 29'; O. Nagy (yellow card) 50'; Osváth (yellow card) 89'; Kanichowsky (yellow card) 90+1'	Stadium: Şenol Güneş Sports Complex; Attendance: 32,569; Referee: Igor Pajač (Croatia)

27 August 2026 Second leg	Ferencváros (Hungary)	4–0 (5–0 agg.)	(Turkey) Trabzonspor	Budapest, Hungary
20:30 CEST	O'Dowda 19'; Corbu 54'; Yusuf 59' (pen.); Listzes 86', (yellow card) 88'	Report	Malinovskyi (red card) 13'; Savić (yellow card) 14'; Cabral (yellow card) 32' (yellow-red card) 57'; Onana (yellow card) 58'	Stadium: Ferencváros Stadion; Attendance: 21,011; Referee: Alen Borošak (Slovenia)

=== UEFA Conference League ===
==== League phase ====
Pos	Team	Pld	W	D	L	GF	GA	GD	Pts	Qualification
10	(Belgium) Sint-Truiden	3	2	1	0	4	1	+3	7	Advance to knockout phase play-offs (seeded)
11	(Netherlands) Ajax	3	2	0	1	9	3	+6	6	Advance to knockout phase play-offs (seeded)
12	(Turkey) Trabzonspor	3	2	0	1	6	3	+3	6	Advance to knockout phase play-offs (seeded)
13	(Croatia) Hajduk Split	3	2	0	1	3	2	+1	6	Advance to knockout phase play-offs (seeded)
14	(Germany) SC Freiburg	3	2	0	1	4	5	−1	6	Advance to knockout phase play-offs (seeded)

Updated to match(es) played on 5 November 2026. Source: UEFA
Rules for classification: League phase tiebreakers

Round	1	2	3	4	5	6
Ground	A	H	H	A	H	A
Result	W	W	L			
Position	3	3	12			
Points	3	6	6			

Updated to match(es) played on 5 November 2026. Source: UEFA
A = Away; H = Home; W = Win; D = Draw; L = Loss

15 October 2026 1	KuPS (Finland)	2–4	(Turkey) Trabzonspor	Tampere, Finland
19:45 TRT	Eskesen (yellow card) 21'; Parzyszek (yellow card) 34', (penalty missed) 59'; Pennanen 54'; Nuhu (yellow card) 85'; Engvall 90+6'	Report	Onuachu 3'; Akaydin (yellow card) 24'; Salah 44'; Djú 47', 90+1'; Mendy (yellow card) 51'	Stadium: Tammelan Stadion; Attendance: 7,812; Referee: Ishmael Barbara (Malta)

22 October 2026 2	Trabzonspor (Turkey)	2–0	(Scotland) Heart of Midlothian	Trabzon, Turkey
19:45 TRT	Cabral (yellow card) 9' (yellow-red card) 90+5'; Salah 32' (pen.); Akaydin (yellow card) 38'; Djú 58'	Report	Miller (yellow card) 11'; Borchgrevink (yellow card) 20'; McPake (yellow card) 90+1'	Stadium: Şenol Güneş Sports Complex; Attendance: 28,093; Referee: Lawrence Visser (Belgium)

5 November 2026 3	Trabzonspor (Turkey)	0–1	(Germany) SC Freiburg	Trabzon, Turkey
20:45 TRT	Saviolo (yellow card) 27'; Nwaiwu (yellow card) 53'	Report	Kübler 14'; Eggestein (yellow card) 68'; Engelhardt (yellow card) 81'; Makengo (yellow card) 84'	Stadium: Şenol Güneş Sports Complex; Attendance: 26,830; Referee: Kristo Tohver (Estonia)

26 November 2026 4	CSKA Sofia (Bulgaria)	–	(Turkey) Trabzonspor	Sofia, Bulgaria
23:00 TRT		Report		Stadium: Vasil Levski National Stadium

10 December 2026 5	Trabzonspor (Turkey)	–	(Czech Republic) Jablonec	Trabzon, Turkey
20:45 TRT		Report		Stadium: Şenol Güneş Sports Complex

17 December 2026 6	Crvena zvezda (Serbia)	–	(Turkey) Trabzonspor	Belgrade, Serbia
23:00 TRT		Report		Stadium: Rajko Mitić Stadium
