= Janito Carvalho =

Cape Verdean football manager

Personal information
- Place of birth: Cape Verde

Managerial career
- Years: Team
- GD Varanda
- Boavista FC (assistant)
- Boavista FC
- 2012–2014: Sporting Clube da Praia
- 2015–2016: Sporting Clube da Praia
- 2016–2017: Académica da Praia
- 2019–2020: Cape Verde
- CD Travadores

Janito Carvalho is a Cape Verdean football manager.

== Life and career ==
Carvalho was born in Cape Verde. He had a younger brother. He suffered a car accident at the age of thirteen. He almost studied in Portugal. He has worked as an air traffic controller. He has played futsal. He attended coaching courses in the Netherlands and Hungary. He started his managerial career with GD Varanda. He helped the club win the league. After that, he was appointed as an assistant manager of Boavista FC. After that, he was appointed manager of the club. He helped the club win the league.

In 2012, he was appointed manager of Sporting Clube da Praia. In 2015, he returned as manager of Sporting Clube da Praia. In 2016, he was appointed manager of Académica da Praia. In 2019, he was appointed manager of the Cape Verde national football team. He was described as "taken an influential role in the tiny island nation's rise through the African game... overseen the progression and sporting education of the country's finest footballing generation" while managing the team. After that, he was appointed manager of CD Travadores.
