= Ayoni Santos =

Cape Verdean footballer (born 2005)

Personal information
- Date of birth: 18 July 2005 (age 21)
- Place of birth: Rotterdam, Netherlands
- Height: 1.65 m (5 ft 5 in)
- Position: Attacking midfielder

Team information
- Current team: PSV Eindhoven/Jong PSV
- Number: 35

Youth career
- De Betrokken Spartaan
- 2012–2023: Sparta Rotterdam

Senior career*
| Years | Team | Apps | (Gls) |
| 2023–2026 | Jong Sparta | 51 | (12) |
| 2025–2026 | Sparta Rotterdam | 29 | (1) |
| 2026– | Jong PSV | 2 | (0) |
| 2026– | PSV Eindhoven | 4 | (0) |

International career^{‡}
| 2026– | Cape Verde | 4 | (1) |
- * Club domestic league appearances and goals as of 20:43, 31 October 2026 (UTC) ‡ National team caps and goals as of 21:45, 13 November 2026 (UTC)

Ayoni Santos (Dutch: [a.ˈjɔ.ni] Portuguese: [ˈsɐ̃.tuʃ]; born 18 July 2005) is a professional football player who plays as an attacking midfielder for Eredivisie club PSV Eindhoven and their reserve team Jong PSV. Born in the Netherlands, he plays for the Cape Verde national team.

== Club career ==
A youth product of Sparta Rotterdam, Santos debuted for their reserves in 2023. On 3 June 2024, he signed his first professional contract on the club until 2027. On 28 May 2025, he extended his contract with the club until 2028.

== International career ==
Born in the Netherlands, Santos is of Cape Verdean descent and holds dual Dutch and Cape Verdean descent.

== Personal life ==
Santos' brother Jamiro Monteiro is also a professional footballer.

== Career statistics ==
=== Club ===
As of match played 31 October 2026

Appearances and goals by club, season and competition
| Club | Season | League | | | Cup | | Europe | | Other | | Total | |
| Club | Season | Division | Apps | Goals | Apps | Goals | Apps | Goals | Apps | Goals | Apps | Goals |
|---|---|---|---|---|---|---|---|---|---|---|---|---|
| Jong Sparta | 2024–25 | Tweede Divisie | 31 | 6 | — | | — | | 2 (Note: Appearances in promotion play-offs) | 1 | 33 | 7 |
| Jong Sparta | 2025–26 | Tweede Divisie | 6 | 6 | — | | — | | — | | 6 | 6 |
| Jong Sparta | Total | | 31 | 12 | — | | — | | 2 | 1 | 39 | 13 |
| Sparta Rotterdam | 2025–26 | Eredivisie | 26 | 1 | 3 | 1 | — | | — | | 29 | 2 |
| Sparta Rotterdam | 2026–27 | Eredivisie | 3 | 0 | 0 | 0 | — | | — | | 3 | 0 |
| Sparta Rotterdam | Total | | 29 | 1 | 3 | 1 | — | | — | | 32 | 2 |
| PSV | 2026–27 | Eredivisie | 4 | 0 | 0 | 0 | 1 (Note: Appearances in UEFA Champions League) | 0 | — | | 5 | 0 |
| Career total | | | 69 | 13 | 3 | 1 | 1 | 0 | 2 | 1 | 75 | 15 |

=== International ===
As of match played 13 November 2026

Appearances and goals by national team and year
| National team | Year | Apps | Goals |
|---|---|---|---|
| Cape Verde | 2026 | 4 | 1 |
| Total | | 4 | 1 |

Scores and results list Cape Verde's goal tally first.

List of international goals scored by Ayoni Santos
| No. | Date | Venue | Opponent | Score | Result | Competition |
|---|---|---|---|---|---|---|
| 1. | 13 November 2026 | Estádio Nacional de Cabo Verde, Praia, Cape Verde | Liberia | 1–0 | 4–2 | 2027 Africa Cup of Nations qualification |
