= Cape Verde national football team =

Men's association football team

Cabo Verde
- Nickname: Blue Sharks (Note: Portuguese: Tubarões Azuis)
- Association: Federação Caboverdiana de Futebol (FCF)
- Confederation: CAF (Africa)
- Sub-confederation: WAFU (West Africa)
- Head coach: Humberto Bettencourt
- Captain: Ryan Mendes
- Most caps: Ryan Mendes (106)
- Top scorer: Ryan Mendes (22)
- Home stadium: Estádio Nacional de Cabo Verde
- FIFA code: CPV
First colours	Second colours	Third colours

FIFA ranking
- Current: 71 ▼3 (18 November 2026)
- Highest: 27 (February 2014)
- Lowest: 182 (April 2000)

First international
- Cape Verde 0–1 Guinea (Guinea-Bissau; 19 April 1978)

Biggest win
- Cape Verde 7–1 São Tomé and Príncipe (Praia, Cape Verde; 13 June 2015); Liechtenstein 0–6 Cape Verde (San Pedro del Pinatar, Spain; 25 March 2022)

Biggest defeat
- Senegal 5–1 Cape Verde (Mali; 12 February 1981); Cape Verde 0–4 Ghana (Praia, Cape Verde; 8 October 2005); Guinea 4–0 Cape Verde (Conakry, Guinea; 9 September 2007); Burkina Faso 4–0 Cape Verde (Ouagadougou, Burkina Faso; 14 November 2017); Algeria 5–1 Cape Verde (Constantine, Algeria; 12 October 2023)

World Cup
- Appearances: 1 (first in 2026)
- Best result: Round of 32 (2026)

Africa Cup of Nations
- Appearances: 4 (first in 2013)
- Best result: Quarter-finals (2013, 2023)

The Cape Verde national football team (Portuguese: seleção nacional de futebol de Cabo Verde), recognised as Cabo Verde (Kabuverdianu: Kabu Verdi) by FIFA, represents Cape Verde in men's international football, and is controlled by the Cape Verdean Football Federation. Nicknamed Blue Sharks (Tubarões Azuis in Portuguese), the national team played its first match on 19 April 1978 against Guinea, a match they lost 0–1. Following the federation's affiliation with the Confederation of African Football and FIFA in 1982, the national team entered Africa Cup of Nations qualification for the first time in 1992 and made its first FIFA World Cup qualification appearance in 2003. Cape Verde plays the majority of its home matches at the Estádio Nacional de Cabo Verde. They qualified for the Africa Cup of Nations for the first time in 2013. Since then, they also appeared in the 2015, 2021 and 2023 tournaments, reaching the quarter-finals in 2013 and 2023.

Cape Verde qualified for the FIFA World Cup for the first time in 2026, becoming the smallest country by land area and the second least populated (after Iceland) to qualify for the World Cup, with a land area of 4,033 square kilometres (1,557 sq mi) and a population of just under 525,000, until Curaçao broke both records just five weeks later by qualifying for the same tournament. In the group stage, they finished second with three draws: 0–0 against the reigning European champions Spain, 2–2 with Uruguay, and 0–0 with Saudi Arabia. Cape Verde qualified for the knockout rounds and were eliminated in a 3–2 loss to defending champions Argentina after extra time.

== History ==
=== Early history ===
Cape Verde became independent from Portugal in 1975. The national team's first international was a 1–0 defeat to Guinea on 29 May 1978, in a tournament in Guinea-Bissau. The Cape Verdean Football Federation was formed in 1982, and joined FIFA in 1986.

On 2 November 2002, Cape Verde faced a non-African team for the first time, in a scoreless friendly against Luxembourg.

Cape Verdeans abroad, who are more numerous than the population of the islands themselves, are a major source of players for the national team. Most of Cape Verde's current international footballers play outside Cape Verde (mainly in Europe, but also in Asia), and some were born outside the islands.

On 4 September 2009, Cape Verde faced Malta in a friendly, resulting in a 2–0 victory.

=== 2010s ===
On 24 May 2010, Cape Verde played out a 0–0 draw in a friendly match against a full-strength Portugal. At the time, Portugal was third in the FIFA rankings and Cape Verde were 117th. Their first World Cup qualifying campaign was for the 2002 tournament, in which Cape Verde was eliminated in the first round after one draw and a defeat against Algeria. In the qualification campaign for the 2006 FIFA World Cup and the 2006 Africa Cup of Nations, Cape Verde advanced to the final round after their first victory in a World Cup qualifier, beating Swaziland. In the final round, the team made an impression with its first-ever away victory against Burkina Faso, but finished fifth in its group and failed to qualify for either tournament.

Then coach João de Deus from Portugal brought in several new players from European leagues for the World Cup and AFCON qualifiers. Cape Verde finished second in its group in the second round, ahead of Tanzania and Mauritius, but behind Cameroon, and did not advance to the third round. Then, Cape Verde made their AFCON debut in 2013, after stunning Cameroon 3–2 on aggregate, following a 2–1 defeat at the Stade Ahmadou Ahidjo in Yaoundé, having won the home leg 2–0 in Praia.

Cape Verde were drawn into Group A of the finals, alongside Angola, Morocco and the host nation South Africa; they played the opening match of the tournament at Soccer City in Johannesburg, Gauteng, against the hosts on 19 January 2013. Pulled from the fourth pot during the group stage drawing of the tournament, Cape Verde actually had the highest FIFA ranking of any team in their group at the time of the drawing, ranking at 51st overall, followed by Morocco (71st), South Africa (72nd) and Angola (83rd).

Cape Verde drew with South Africa 0–0 in the tournament's first match, before drawing with Morocco 1–1. Platini scored Cape Verde's first ever goal at the AFCON, before they won their first ever AFCON match against Angola, 2–1 (despite an early own goal by captain Nando Maria Neves), reaching the quarter-finals.

On 2 February 2013, Cape Verde faced Ghana in the Nelson Mandela Bay Stadium in Port Elizabeth, registering 16 shots on Ghana's goal to their eight, with seven shots on target to their two. Ghana eventually knocked Cape Verde out.

On 15 October 2014, Cape Verde became the first of two nations to qualify for the 2015 Africa Cup of Nations alongside Algeria, joining the host nation Equatorial Guinea after defeating Mozambique 1–0 at home. The team, under newly appointed manager Rui Águas, picked up where Lúcio Antunes left off and managed to finish in the top two of the group stage with two matches remaining to play in the qualification process, having been drawn in a group together with Mozambique, Niger and Zambia. On 15 November 2014, Cape Verde secured first place in their group, finishing as Group F winners by defeating Niger 3–1 at home, with one match remaining to play for qualification.

Cape Verde were drawn into Group B of the final tournament, together with Zambia, Tunisia and DR Congo. On 18 January 2015 they played their first match against Tunisia at the Estadio de Ebibeyin. The match ended in a 1–1 draw, with Héldon leveling the score off a penalty kick in the 78th minute. Cape Verde then drew 0–0 against DR Congo four days later, with their group stage placement depending on the final match results of both teams. Facing off against Zambia on 26 January, the match ended in 0–0 draw, leaving both Cape Verde and Zambia eliminated from the Cup. Contested during a tropical storm, with 26 mm (1.0 in) of rainfall, Cape Verde exited the tournament tied with DR Congo for points and undefeated, finishing behind them on goal difference.

On 31 March 2015, Cape Verde won 2–0 against Portugal at the Estádio António Coimbra da Mota in Estoril.

=== 2020s: Rapid rise and World Cup qualification ===
Cape Verde qualified for the 2023 Africa Cup of Nations and were drawn into Group B. They defeated Ghana 2–1 in the first group stage match when Garry Rodrigues scored a late match-winning goal in the second minute of stoppage time. In their second match, Cape Verde defeated Mozambique 3-0. This result, along with others in the group, meant that Cape Verde entered the final group match already having secured passage to the knockout stage as the winners of Group B. In the last group stage match, Cape Verde faced Egypt. After the Egypt had scored a go-ahead stoppage time goal, Bryan Teixeira equalised deep into stoppage time to secure a 2–2 draw. In the Round of 16, Cape Verde faced Mauritania, and captain Ryan Mendes scored a crucial penalty late in the second half to send them to the quarter-finals, where Cape Verde faced South Africa. The match ended in a goalless draw after 120 minutes, thus sending it to penalties. Cape Verde were knocked out of the tournament after failing to convert four of their five penalty kicks, losing the shootout 1–2.

Pos	Team	Pld	W	D	L	GF	GA	GD	Pts	Qualification
1	Cape Verde	3	2	1	0	7	3	+4	7	Advance to knockout stage
2	Egypt	3	0	3	0	6	6	0	3	Advance to knockout stage
3	Ghana	3	0	2	1	5	6	−1	2 (Note: Tied on head-to-head points. Overall goal difference: Ghana −1, Mozambique −3.)	
4	Mozambique	3	0	2	1	4	7	−3	2	

Source: CAF

==== 2026 FIFA World Cup ====
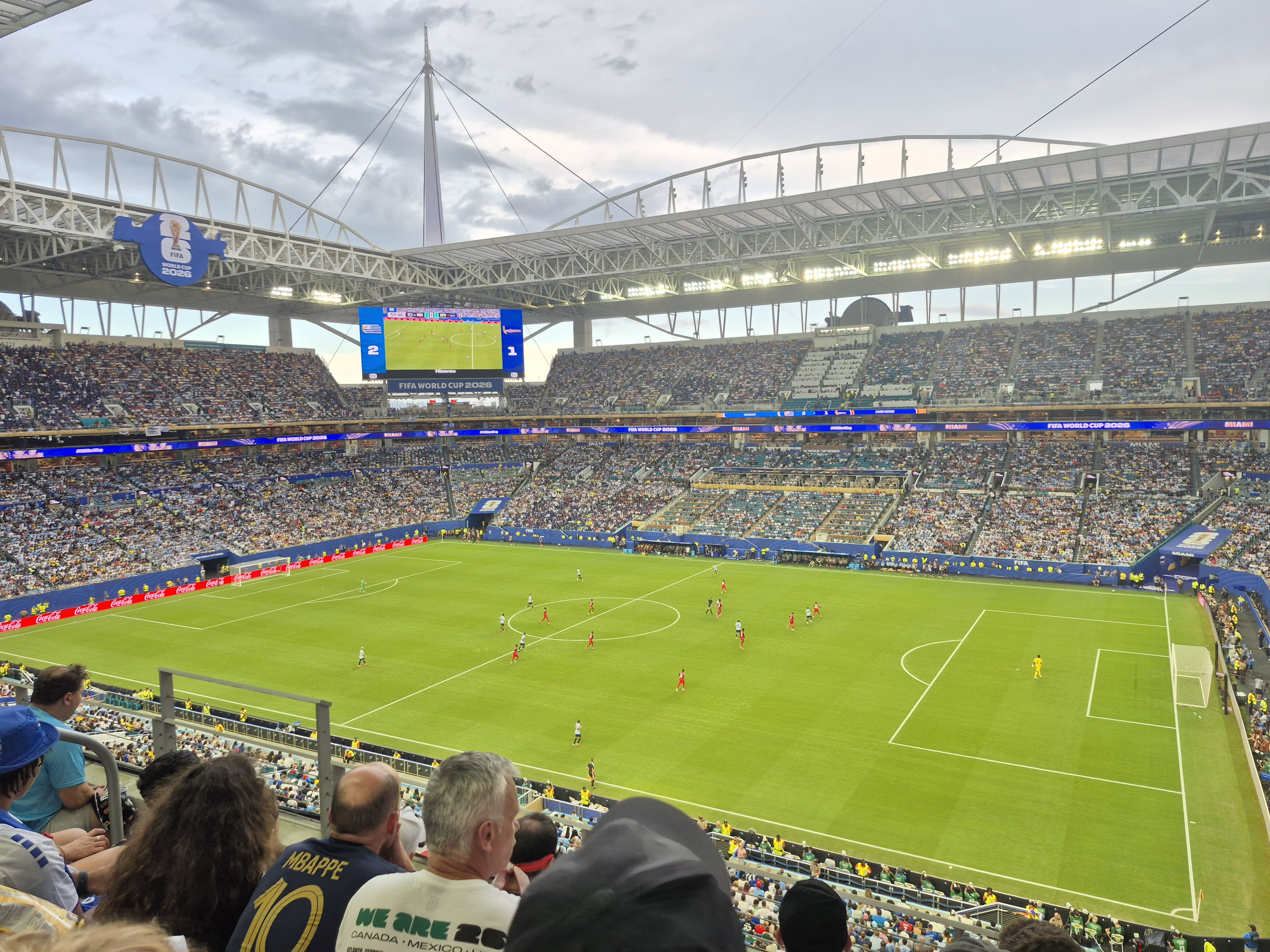
2026 FIFA World Cup 2026 match on 21 June, showing Cape Verde players in red jerseys competing against Uruguay in light blue in Miami Gardens, Florida, United States.

Cape Verde qualified for the 2026 FIFA World Cup after winning its qualifying group in October 2025. In its opening game, the team held eventual champions Spain to a goalless draw, exceeding expectations and earning Cape Verde its first ever point. As Spain was ranked significantly higher than Cape Verde, the draw brought attention to all of the team's players, with the team's goalkeeper, Vozinha, gaining almost 30 million followers on social media platform Instagram. In its second match, the team tied Uruguay 2–2, scoring its first World Cup goals, and once again, exceeding expectations. With a third (0–0) draw against Saudi Arabia, Cape Verde finished undefeated and as runners-up in its group.

Cape Verde faced the defending champions Argentina in the Round of 32, holding them to a 1–1 score after the regulatory 90-minute period before going on to lose 3–2 in extra time. The team's performance at the World Cup almost instantly became highly regarded as one of the biggest underdog stories in World Cup history, and the match with Argentina as one of the greatest individual World Cup games of all time. Vozinha was voted into the Dream XI all-star team, while Sidny Lopes Cabral's equalizing goal against Argentina was named the Goal of the Tournament.

== Kit history ==
=== Kit manufacturer ===
Kit providers	Period
(Germany) Adidas	1978–1992
(France) Duarig	1992–1993
(Portugal) Saillev	1994–2001
(Portugal) Tepa	2002–2007
(Italy) Erreà	2008–2009
(Spain) KS Sport	2010–2011
(Germany) Adidas	2012
(Portugal) Tepa	2013
(Denmark) Hummel	2014–2015
(Portugal) Lacatoni	2016–2017
(Germany) Adidas	2018–2021
(Austria) Tempo Sport	2022–2026
(United States) Capelli Sport	2026–present

== Stadiums ==
The national team played at Estádio da Várzea in Praia, on Santiago Island. The stadium reopened in 2006 and has a capacity of 8,000.

Currently, the team plays the majority of its home matches at the Estádio Nacional de Cabo Verde. The Tubarões Azuis matches have also been held at the 5,000-seat Adérito Sena Municipal Stadium in Mindelo.

== Results and fixtures ==
The following is a list of match results in the last 12 months, as well as any future matches that have been scheduled.

Win Draw Loss Fixture

=== 2026 ===
27 March 2026 FIFA Series	Chile	4–2	Cape Verde	Auckland, New Zealand
16:00 UTC+13	Brereton 16'; M. Gutiérrez 58'; Loyola 67'; Tapia 79'	Report	Livramento 21'; Diney (red card) 43'; Lopes Cabral 45+3'	Stadium: Eden Park; Referee: Calvin Berg (New Zealand)

30 March 2026 FIFA Series	Cape Verde	1–1 (4–2 p)	Finland	Auckland, New Zealand
16:00 UTC+13	Pires 67'	Report	Skyttä 45+4'	Stadium: Eden Park; Referee: Anna-Marie Keighley (New Zealand)
	Penalties
	Lopes Cabral (penalty scored); J. Cabral (penalty missed); K. Pina (penalty scored); Da Costa (penalty scored); R. Mendes (penalty scored)		(penalty scored) Walta; (penalty scored) Valakari; (penalty missed) Keskinen; (penalty missed) Oksanen

31 May Friendly	Cape Verde	3–0	Serbia	Lisbon, Portugal
	Pina 11'; L. Duarte 59'; Benchimol 63'	Report		Stadium: Estádio do Restelo; Referee: João António Gonçalves (Portugal)

6 June Friendly	Cape Verde	3–0	Bermuda	East Hartford, Connecticut, United States
16:00 UTC−4	Semedo 33'; Rodrigues 49'; Da Costa 90+1'	Report		Stadium: Pratt & Whitney Stadium at Rentschler Field

15 June 2026 World Cup GS	Spain	0–0	Cape Verde	Atlanta, Georgia, United States
12:00 UTC−4		Report		Stadium: Mercedes-Benz Stadium; Attendance: 67,640; Referee: Adham Makhadmeh (Jordan)

21 June 2026 World Cup GS	Uruguay	2–2	Cape Verde	Miami Gardens, Florida, United States
18:00 UTC−4	Araújo 44'; Canobbio 45+6'	Report	Pina 21'; Varela 61'	Stadium: Hard Rock Stadium; Attendance: 64,003; Referee: Espen Eskås (Norway)

26 June 2026 World Cup GS	Cape Verde	0–0	Saudi Arabia	Houston, Texas, United States
19:00 UTC−5		Report		Stadium: NRG Stadium; Attendance: 68,278; Referee: François Letexier (France)

3 July 2026 World Cup R32	Argentina	3–2 (a.e.t.)	Cape Verde	Miami Gardens, Florida, United States
18:00 UTC−4	Messi 29'; Li. Martínez 92'; Diney 111' (o.g.)	Report	D. Duarte 59'; Lopes Cabral 103'	Stadium: Hard Rock Stadium; Attendance: 64,478; Referee: Drew Fischer (Canada)

25 September 2027 AFCON qualification	Mali	3–1	Cape Verde	Bamako, Mali
21:00 UTC+0	Tia 5'; Nene 39', 51'	Report	Lopes Cabral 10'	Stadium: 26 March Stadium; Referee: Jean-Jacques Ndala (DR Congo)

29 September 2027 AFCON qualification	Cape Verde	1–2	Rwanda	Praia, Cape Verde
18:00 UTC+0	Benchimol 40'	Report	Niyomugabo 45+2'; Iradukunda 52'	Stadium: Estádio Nacional de Cabo Verde; Referee: Louis Houngnandande (Benin)

13 November 2027 AFCON qualification	Cape Verde	4–2	Liberia	Praia, Cape Verde
17:00 UTC−1	Santos 5'; Djé 38'; Livramento 43'; Sanches Fernandes 90+1'	Report	Nyenetue 36'; Kosiah 90+5' (pen.)	Stadium: Estádio Nacional de Cabo Verde; Referee: Ahmed Abdulrazg (Libya)

17 November 2027 AFCON qualification	Liberia	2–0	Cape Verde	Monrovia, Liberia
TBD	Sherman 47'; Nimely 86'	Report		Stadium: Samuel Kanyon Doe Sports Complex; Referee: Brighton Chimene (Zimbabwe)

=== 2027 ===
24 March 2027 AFCON qualification	Cape Verde	v	Mali	TBD
TBD

28 March 2027 AFCON qualification	Rwanda	v	Cape Verde	TBD
TBD

== Coaching history ==
Caretaker managers are listed in italics.

- (Portugal) Carlos Alhinho (1985–1986)
- (Portugal) Óscar (1998–2003)
- (Portugal) Alexandre Alhinho (2003–2006)
- (Cape Verde) Ze Rui (2006)
- (Brazil) Ricardo da Rocha (2007)
- (Portugal) João de Deus (2008–2010)
- (Cape Verde) Lúcio Antunes (2010–2013)
- (Portugal) Rui Águas (2014–2016)
- (Cape Verde) Beto (2016)
- (Cape Verde) Lúcio Antunes (2016–2018)
- (Portugal) Rui Águas (2018–2019)
- (Cape Verde) Janito Carvalho (2019–2020)
- (Cape Verde) Bubista (2020–2026)
- (Cape Verde) Humberto Bettencourt (2026–present)

== Players ==
=== Current squad ===
The following players were called up to the 2027 Africa Cup of Nations qualification matches against Liberia on 11 and 15 November 2026.

Caps and goals correct as of 17 November 2026, after the second match against Liberia.

No.	Pos.	Player	Date of birth (age)	Caps	Goals	Club
	GK	Vozinha	3 June 1986 (age 40)	96	0	(Football Federation of Chile) Colo-Colo
	GK	Márcio Rosa	23 February 1997 (age 29)	10	0	(Romanian Football Federation) UTA Arad
	GK	CJ dos Santos	24 August 2000 (age 26)	1	0	(United States Soccer Federation) San Diego
	DF	Diney Borges	17 January 1995 (age 31)	39	2	(United Arab Emirates Football Association) Sharjah
	DF	Logan Costa	1 April 2001 (age 25)	31	0	(Royal Spanish Football Federation) Villarreal
	DF	Steven Moreira	13 August 1994 (age 32)	24	0	(United States Soccer Federation) Columbus Crew
	DF	Wagner Pina	3 November 2002 (age 24)	16	0	(Turkish Football Federation) Trabzonspor
	DF	Sidny Lopes Cabral	18 September 2003 (age 23)	16	4	(Turkish Football Federation) Trabzonspor
	DF	David Moreira	18 April 2004 (age 22)	5	0	(Portuguese Football Federation) Gil Vicente
	DF	Ivanildo Fernandes	26 March 1996 (age 30)	2	0	(Portuguese Football Federation) Nacional
	DF	Yuran Fernandes	19 October 1994 (age 32)	1	0	(Football Association of Indonesia) Persebaya Surabaya
	MF	Jamiro Monteiro	23 November 1993 (age 32)	61	5	(Royal Dutch Football Association) NEC
	MF	João Paulo	26 May 1998 (age 28)	44	1	(Romanian Football Federation) FCSB
	MF	Kevin Pina Lenini	27 January 1997 (age 29)	38	4	(Russian Football Union) Krasnodar
	MF	Deroy Duarte	4 July 1999 (age 27)	36	1	(Bulgarian Football Union) Ludogorets Razgrad
	MF	Laros Duarte	28 February 1997 (age 29)	24	1	(Hungarian Football Federation) Puskás Akadémia
	MF	Djé Tavares	2 June 2003 (age 23)	4	1	(Portuguese Football Federation) Santa Clara
	MF	Elson Mendes	18 September 2005 (age 21)	1	0	(Turkish Football Federation) Kasımpaşa
	FW	Ryan Mendes	8 January 1990 (age 36)	104	22	(Royal Moroccan Football Federation) Berkane
	FW	Dailon Livramento	4 May 2001 (age 25)	27	6	(Italian Football Federation) Hellas Verona
	FW	Hélio Varela	3 May 2002 (age 24)	25	1	(Israel Football Association) Maccabi Tel Aviv
	FW	Nuno da Costa	10 February 1991 (age 35)	15	1	(Turkish Football Federation) Antalyaspor
	FW	Leandro Andrade	24 September 1999 (age 27)	8	0	(Ukrainian Association of Football) Polissya Zhytomyr
	FW	Ayoni Santos	18 July 2005 (age 21)	5	1	(Royal Dutch Football Association) PSV Eindhoven
	FW	Ieltsin Camões	16 April 1999 (age 27)	3	0	(Polish Football Association) Śląsk Wrocław
	FW	Derensili Sanches Fernandes	28 May 2001 (age 25)	1	1	(The Football Association) Huddersfield Town

=== Recent call-ups ===
The following players have been called up for Cape Verde in the last 12 months and are still eligible to represent.

Pos.	Player	Date of birth (age)	Caps	Goals	Club	Latest call-up
DF	Pico Lopes	17 June 1992 (age 34)	50	0	(Republic of Ireland) Shamrock Rovers	v. Rwanda, 29 September 2026
DF	Kelvin Pires	5 June 2000 (age 26)	6	1	(Finland) SJK	v. Rwanda, 29 September 2026
DF	Stopira	20 May 1988 (age 38)	61	4	(Portugal) Torreense	v. 2026 FIFA World Cup
MF	Telmo Arcanjo	21 June 2001 (age 25)	20	1	(Portugal) Vitória de Guimarães	v. Rwanda, 29 September 2026
MF	Yannick Semedo	29 December 1995 (age 30)	13	1	(Saudi Arabia) Al-Jabalain	v. 2026 FIFA World Cup
FW	Garry Rodrigues	27 November 1990 (age 35)	65	10	(Cyprus) Apollon Limassol	v. Rwanda, 29 September 2026
FW	Willy Semedo	27 April 1994 (age 32)	41	3	(United Arab Emirates) United	v. Rwanda, 29 September 2026
FW	Jovane Cabral	14 June 1998 (age 28)	33	3	(Brazil) Grêmio	v. Rwanda, 29 September 2026
FW	Gilson Benchimol	29 December 2001 (age 24)	26	7	(Russia) Akron Tolyatti	v. Rwanda, 29 September 2026
^{WD} Player withdrew from the roster for non-injury related reasons.^{INJ} Player withdrew from the squad due to an injury.^{PRE} Preliminary squad.^{SUS} Suspended from the national team.

== Records and statistics ==
As of 13 November 2026
Players in bold are still active with Cape Verde.

=== Most appearances ===
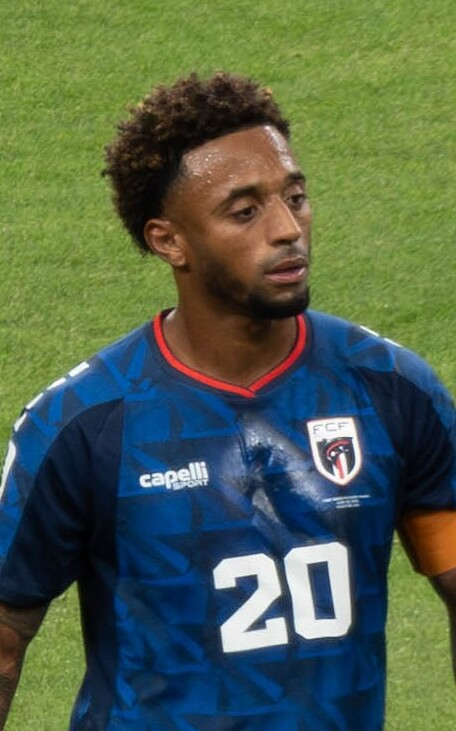
Ryan Mendes is Cape Verde's top goalscorer and their most capped player.

Rank	Player	Caps	Goals	Career
1	**Ryan Mendes**	104	22	2010–present
2	**Vozinha**	95	0	2012–present
3	**Garry Rodrigues**	65	10	2013–present
4	**Jamiro Monteiro**	62	5	2016–present
4	Babanco	62	5	2007–2019
5	**Stopira**	61	4	2007–present
7	Héldon	52	15	2008–2019
7	Marco Soares	52	3	2006–2021
7	Fernando Varela	52	3	2008–2019
10	**Pico Lopes**	50	0	2019–present

=== Top goalscorers ===
Rank	Player	Goals	Caps	Ratio	Career
1	**Ryan Mendes**	22	104	0.21	2010–present
2	Héldon	15	52	0.29	2008–2019
3	Caló	11	27	0.41	1995–2007
4	**Garry Rodrigues**	10	65	0.15	2013–present
5	**Dailon Livramento**	8	27	0.3	2024–present
5	Júlio Tavares	8	48	0.17	2012–2022
7	**Gilson Benchimol**	7	26	0.27	2020–present
7	Lito	7	47	0.15	2002–2012
9	Toni	6	11	0.55	1992–2003
9	Bebé	6	27	0.22	2022–present
9	Djaniny	6	35	0.17	2012–2020

=== Other records and statistics ===
- Cape Verde players sent off (8 times):
  - Janicio Gomes v DR Congo, 4 September 2005 (91st minute)
  - Kay v Morocco, 29 March 2016 (53rd minute)
  - Hélder v Lesotho, 9 September 2018 (87th minute)
  - Patrick Andrade v Senegal, 25 January 2022 (21st minute)
  - Vozinha v Senegal, 25 January 2022 (57th minute)
  - Steeve Furtado v Comoros, 17 October 2023 (45th minute)
  - Kevin Pina v Mauritania, 19 November 2024 (60th minute)
  - Diney Borges v Chile, 27 March 2026 (43rd minute)
- Opponent players sent off (7 times):
  - Lounes Gaouaoui for Algeria, 2 June 2007 (26th minute)
  - Alex Song for Cameroon, 6 September 2008 (90th minute)
  - Andre Pinto for Portugal, 31 March 2015 (60th minute)
  - Eric Mathoho for South Africa, 1 September 2017 (68th minute)
  - Ally Niyonzima for Rwanda, 17 November 2020 (29th minute)
  - Yared Bayeh for Ethiopia, 9 January 2022 (12th minute)
  - Hamad Al Shamsan for Bahrain, 23 September 2022 (77th minute)
- First match played: v Guinea, 29 April 1978
- First goal scored: v Guinea-Bissau, 1 May 1978 (2nd minute)
- First official goal scored: Nelo Tambarina v Mali, 17 November 1995 (67th minute)
- Most appearances: **104**, Ryan Mendes (2010–present)
- Top goalscorer: **22**, Ryan Mendes (2010–present)
- Most consecutive appearances: **23**, Vozinha (from 7 January 2015 to 1 June 2018)
- Largest comeback to win the match: **2 goals**, v Congo, 10 January 2015
- Largest blown lead to lose the match: **2 goals**, v Togo, 10 September 2023
- Longest streak without a draw: **21**, from 29 April 1978 to 8 February 1984
- Longest winning streak: **3** (5 times):
  - from 11 May 2000 to 3 July 2000
  - from 25 March 2009 to 4 September 2009
  - from 16 November 2010 to 9 February 2011
  - from 7 October 2021 to 13 November 2021
  - from 23 March 2022 to 28 March 2022
- Longest unbeaten streak: **9**, from 20 March 2025 to 17 November 2025
- Longest losing streak: **7**, from 4 June 2005 to 3 September 2006
- Longest winless streak: **9**, from 28 November 1997 to 4 May 2000
- Longest goalless streak: **480 minutes**, from 4 July 1985 to 2 March 1987
- Most consecutive minutes without conceding a goal: **412 minutes**, from 29 January 2024 to 6 September 2024
- Longest goalless streak by both teams: **234 minutes**, from 9 September 2007 to 5 December 2007
- Biggest win: **6 goals** (2 times):
  - v São Tomé and Príncipe, 13 June 2015
  - v Liechtenstein, 25 March 2022
- Biggest defeat: **4 goals** (6 times):
  - v Senegal, 12 February 1981
  - v Senegal, 4 November 2001
  - v Ghana, 8 October 2005
  - v Guinea, 9 September 2007
  - v Burkina Faso, 14 November 2017
  - v Algeria, 12 October 2023
- Most goals by a player in a match: **3**, Gilson Benchimol v Liechtenstein, 25 March 2022
- Most goals by an opponent player in a match: **3** (2 times):
  - Pauleta for Portugal, 27 May 2006
  - Préjuce Nakoulma for Burkina Faso, 14 November 2017
- Most goals in a match: **7**, v São Tomé and Príncipe, 13 June 2015
- Most goals in first half: **4** (2 times):
  - v São Tomé and Príncipe, 13 June 2015
  - v Liechtenstein, 25 March 2022
- Most goals in second half: **3** (4 times):
  - v Swaziland, 16 November 2003
  - v Niger, 14 November 2014
  - v Congo, 10 January 2015
  - v São Tomé and Príncipe, 13 June 2015
- Most goals conceded in a match: **5** (3 times):
  - v Senegal, 4 November 2001
  - v Togo, 8 June 2003
  - v Algeria, 12 October 2023
- Most goals conceded in first half: **4**, v Guinea, 9 September 2007
- Most goals conceded in second half: **4**, v Senegal, 4 November 2001
- Most goals by both teams in a match: **8**, v São Tomé and Príncipe, 13 June 2015
- Most goals by both teams in first half: **5**, v Togo, 8 June 2003
- Most goals by both teams in second half: **5**, v Senegal, 4 November 2001
- Fewest goals by both teams in a match: **0** (33 times), last time v Saudi Arabia, 26 June 2026
- Fastest goal: **2nd minute** (4 times):
  - v Guinea-Bissau, 1 May 1978
  - Cafú v Burkina Faso, 9 October 2004
  - Kenny Rocha v Comoros, 17 October 2023
  - Ryan Mendes v Guyana, 21 March 2024
- Fastest goal by opponent: **1st minute** (3 times):
  - Pauleta for Portugal, 27 May 2006
  - **58 seconds**, Victor Osimhen for Nigeria, 16 November 2021
  - **45 seconds**, Pico Lopes (o.g.) for Libya, 8 October 2025
- Fastest two goals scored to start the match: **13 minutes**, v Zimbabwe, 8 October 2011
- Fastest two goals conceded to start the match: **12 minutes** (2 times):
  - v Algeria, 21 April 2000
  - v South Africa, 4 June 2005

== Competitive record ==
=== FIFA World Cup ===
FIFA World Cup record										Qualification record					
Year	Round	Position	Pld	W	D*	L	GF	GA	Squad	Pld	W	D	L	GF	GA
1930 to 1974	Part of Portugal									Part of Portugal					
1978 and 1982	Not a member of FIFA									Not a member of FIFA					
1986 to 1998	Did not enter									Did not enter					
(South Korea) (Japan) 2002	Did not qualify									2	0	1	1	0	2
(Germany) 2006	Did not qualify									12	4	2	6	12	16
(South Africa) 2010	Did not qualify									6	3	0	3	7	8
(Brazil) 2014	Did not qualify									6	3	0	3	9	7
(Russia) 2018	Did not qualify									8	3	0	5	6	13
(Qatar) 2022	Did not qualify									6	3	2	1	8	6
(Canada) (Mexico) (United States) 2026	Round of 32	32nd	4	0	3	1	4	5	Squad	10	7	2	1	16	8
(Morocco) (Portugal) (Spain) 2030	To be determined									To be determined					
(Saudi Arabia) 2034	To be determined									To be determined					
Total: 2/11	Round of 32	32nd	4	0	3	1	4	5	—N/a	50	23	7	20	58	60

=== Africa Cup of Nations ===
Africa Cup of Nations record										Qualification record					
Year	Round	Position	Pld	W	D*	L	GF	GA	Squad	Pld	W	D	L	GF	GA
1957 to 1974	Part of Portugal									Part of Portugal					
1976 to 1992	Not a member of CAF									Not a member of CAF					
(Tunisia) 1994	Did not qualify									2	1	0	1	2	4
(South Africa) 1996	Withdrew									Withdrew					
(Burkina Faso) 1998	Did not enter									Did not enter					
(Ghana) (Nigeria) 2000	Did not qualify									2	0	1	1	0	3
(Mali) 2002	Did not qualify									2	0	1	1	1	2
(Tunisia) 2004	Did not qualify									6	3	0	3	9	8
(Egypt) 2006	Did not qualify									12	4	2	8	11	16
(Ghana) 2008	Did not qualify									6	1	2	3	3	10
(Angola) 2010	Did not qualify									6	3	0	3	7	8
(Equatorial Guinea) (Gabon) 2012	Did not qualify									6	3	1	2	7	7
(South Africa) 2013	Quarter-finals	7th	4	1	2	1	3	4	Squad	4	4	0	0	10	3
(Equatorial Guinea) 2015	Group stage	11th	3	0	3	0	1	1	Squad	6	4	0	2	9	6
(Gabon) 2017	Did not qualify									6	3	0	3	10	7
(Egypt) 2019	Did not qualify									6	1	2	3	4	5
(Cameroon) 2021	Round of 16	15th	4	1	1	2	2	4	Squad	6	2	4	0	6	3
(Ivory Coast) 2023	Quarter-finals	5th	5	3	2	0	8	3	Squad	6	3	1	2	8	6
(Morocco) 2025	Did not qualify									6	1	1	4	3	7
(Kenya) (Tanzania) (Uganda) 2027	TBD									TBD					
2028	TBD									TBD					
Total	Quarter-finals	4/35	16	5	8	3	14	12	—N/a	82	33	15	34	90	95

== Head-to-head record ==
As of 29 September 2026, after match against Rwanda.

Positive Record Neutral Record Negative Record

Opponent	Pld	W	D	L	GF	GA	GD	% Win	First meeting	Last meeting	Federation
Algeria	6	1	2	3	6	13	−7	16.67%	2000	2023	CAF
Andorra	2	1	1	0	2	1	+1	50%	2018	2020	UEFA
Angola	8	3	3	2	10	9	+1	37.5%	1988	2025	CAF
Argentina	1	0	0	1	2	3	-1	0%	2026	2026	CONMEBOL
Bahrain	1	1	0	0	2	1	+1	100%	2022	2022	AFC
Bermuda	1	1	0	0	3	0	+3	100%	2026	2026	CONCACAF
Botswana	2	0	0	2	0	2	–2	0%	2024	2024	CAF
Burkina Faso	9	4	1	4	7	11	–4	44.44%	2004	2023	CAF
Cameroon	9	2	3	4	10	12	–2	22.22%	2008	2025	CAF
Central African Republic	2	1	1	0	3	2	+1	50%	2021	2021	CAF
Chile	1	0	0	1	2	4	–2	0%	2026	2026	CONMEBOL
Comoros	1	0	0	1	1	2	–1	0%	2023	2023	CAF
DR Congo	3	0	2	1	2	3	–1	0%	2004	2015	CAF
Ecuador	1	0	0	1	0	1	–1	0%	2022	2022	CONMEBOL
Egypt	4	0	3	1	4	7	–3	0%	2024	2025	CAF
Equatorial Guinea	4	4	0	0	12	0	+12	100%	2009	2024	CAF
Eswatini	6	4	2	0	10	1	+9	66.67%	2003	2025	CAF
Ethiopia	1	1	0	0	1	0	+1	100%	2022	2022	CAF
Finland	1	0	1	0	1	1	0	0%	2026	2026	UEFA
Gabon	1	0	1	0	1	1	0	0%	2013	2013	CAF
Gambia	9	2	3	4	7	13	–6	22.22%	1982	2007	CAF
Georgia	1	0	1	0	1	1	0	0%	2025	2025	UEFA
Ghana	7	3	0	4	4	10	–6	42.85%	2001	2024	CAF
Guadeloupe	1	1	0	0	2	0	+2	100%	2022	2022	CONCACAF
Guinea	8	2	2	4	6	10	–4	25.00%	1982	2020	CAF
Guinea-Bissau	13	5	3	5	13	13	0	38.46%	1979	2010	CAF
Guyana	1	1	0	0	1	0	+1	100%	2024	2024	CONCACAF
Iran	1	0	1	0	0	0	0	0%	2025	2025	AFC
Malaysia	2	1	1	0	4	1	3	75.00%	2025	2025	AFC
Kenya	4	1	0	3	2	3	–1	25.00%	2002	2015	CAF
Lesotho	2	0	2	0	1	1	0	0%	2018	2019	CAF
Liberia	6	4	0	2	8	7	+1	66.67%	2000	2021	CAF
Libya	4	2	1	1	6	5	+1	50.00%	2015	2025	CAF
Liechtenstein	1	1	0	0	6	0	+6	100%	2022	2022	UEFA
Luxembourg	4	1	3	0	3	1	+2	25.00%	2002	2017	UEFA
Madagascar	2	2	0	0	7	1	+6	100%	2012	2012	CAF
Mali	14	4	3	7	8	18	–10	28.57%	1981	2026	CAF
Mauritania	14	7	3	4	20	12	+8	50.00%	1982	2024	CAF
Mauritius	4	4	0	0	7	1	+6	100%	2008	2025	CAF
Morocco	4	0	2	2	1	4	–3	0%	2013	2023	CAF
Mozambique	5	3	1	1	7	4	+3	60.00%	2014	2024	CAF
Niger	2	2	0	0	6	2	+4	100%	2014	2014	CAF
Nigeria	3	0	2	1	2	3	–1	0%	2013	2021	CAF
Portugal	3	1	1	1	3	4	–1	33.33%	2006	2015	UEFA
Rwanda	3	0	2	1	1	2	–1	0%	2020	2026	CAF
San Marino	1	1	0	0	2	0	+2	100%	2022	2022	UEFA
Saudi Arabia	1	0	1	0	0	0	0	0%	2026	2026	AFC
Senegal	20	2	2	16	8	34	–26	10.00%	1979	2022	CAF
Serbia	1	1	0	0	3	0	+3	100.00%	2026	2026	UEFA
Sierra Leone	13	4	2	7	7	14	–7	30.76%	1983	2022	CAF
South Africa	6	2	2	2	6	6	0	33.33%	2004	2024	CAF
Spain	1	0	1	0	0	0	0	0%	2026	2026	UEFA
Tanzania	4	2	0	2	5	5	0	50.00%	2008	2018	CAF
Togo	5	3	0	2	10	10	0	60.00%	2003	2023	CAF
Tunisia	3	0	1	2	2	6	–4	0%	2012	2015	CAF
Uganda	4	1	0	3	1	3	–2	25.00%	2004	2018	CAF
Uruguay	1	0	1	0	2	2	0	00.00%	2026	2026	CONMEBOL
Zambia	3	1	1	1	2	2	0	33.33%	2014	2015	CAF
Zimbabwe	2	1	1	0	2	1	+1	50.00%	2010	2011	CAF
Total (55)	245	90	60	95	257	271	–14	36.73%	1979	2026	FIFA

== Honours ==
=== Regional ===
- Amílcar Cabral Cup
  - (gold) Champions (1): 2000
  - (silver) Runners-up (1): 2007
  - (bronze) Third place (1): 1995
- Lusofonia Games
  - (gold) Champions (1): 2009
  - (bronze) Third place (1): 2006

=== Friendly ===
- FIFA Series (1): 2024 Saudi Arabia A
