= Humberto Bettencourt =

Cape Verdean football coach

Personal information
- Full name: Humberto Frederico Silva Bettencourt
- Date of birth: 24 April 1975 (age 51)
- Place of birth: São Domingos, Cape Verde

Team information
- Current team: Cape Verde (manager)

Managerial career
- Years: Team
- 2020–2026: Cape Verde (assistant)
- 2026–: Cape Verde

Humberto Frederico Silva Bettencourt (Portuguese: [ũ.ˈbɛɾ.tu fɾɨ.dɨ.ˈɾi.ku ˈsil.vɐ bɨ.tẽ.ˈkur]; born 24 April 1975) is a Cape Verdean football coach who is the current manager of the Cape Verde national football team.

== Early life and coaching career ==
Bettencourt was born in São Domingos, Cape Verde. He worked in Cape Verde's domestic leagues. His coaching development was supported by an Olympic Solidarity scholarship.

== Cape Verde national team ==
Bettencourt joined the coaching staff of the Cape Verde national football team in 2020 as assistant to head coach Bubista. In that role he helped Cape Verde ("Tubarões Azuis", the Blue Sharks) qualify for the Africa Cup of Nations in 2023 and 2024, and for the 2026 FIFA World Cup, the country's first World Cup appearance. At the 2026 World Cup, Cape Verde drew with Spain, Uruguay, and Saudi Arabia in the group stage before being eliminated by Argentina in extra time in the round of 32.

Following the tournament, Bubista departed to take charge of Moroccan club RS Berkane. On 19 August 2026, the Cape Verdean Football Federation (Federação Cabo-verdiana de Futebol, FCF) confirmed Bettencourt as the new head coach ("selecionador nacional") of the national team, succeeding Bubista. The FCF described the appointment as a bet on continuity for the national team's sporting project.

== Personal life ==
Bettencourt holds Cape Verdean and Portuguese nationality.
