= 2027 Africa Cup of Nations qualification Group K =

2027 AFCON qualifying group K

Group K of the 2027 Africa Cup of Nations qualification is one of twelve groups that will decide the teams which will qualify for the 2027 Africa Cup of Nations final tournament in Kenya, Tanzania and Uganda. The group consists of four teams: Mali, Cape Verde, Rwanda and Liberia.

The teams will play against each other in a home-and-away round-robin format between September 2026 and March 2027.

== Standings ==
Pos	Team	Pld	W	D	L	GF	GA	GD	Pts	Qualification	(Mali)	(Rwanda)	(Liberia)	(Cape Verde)
1	Mali (Q)	4	4	0	0	9	3	+6	12	Final tournament	—	3–2	28 Mar	3–1
2	Rwanda	4	2	0	2	7	7	0	6	Final tournament	0–2	—	3–1	28 Mar
3	Liberia	4	1	0	3	5	8	−3	3		0–1	24 Mar	—	2–0
4	Cape Verde	4	1	0	3	6	9	−3	3		24 Mar	1–2	4–2	—

Updated to match(es) played on 17November 2026. Source: CAF
Rules for classification: Tiebreakers
(Q) Qualified for the phase indicated

== Matches ==
25 September 2026
18:00 UTC+2

Rwanda	3–1	Liberia
Biramahire 2'; L. Mickels 33'; J. Mickels 44' (pen.)	Report	Nimely 38'

Amahoro Stadium, Kigali
Referee: Hillary Hambaba (Zambia)
25 September 2026
19:00 UTC+0

Mali	3–1	Cape Verde
Tia 5'; Nene 39', 51'	Report	Lopes Cabral 10'

26 March Stadium, Bamako
Referee: Jean-Jacques Ndala (DR Congo)

29 September 2026
15:00 UTC−1

Cape Verde	1–2	Rwanda
Benchimol 40'	Report	Niyomugabo 45+2'; Iradukunda 52'

Estádio Nacional de Cabo Verde, Praia
Referee: Louis Houngnandande (Benin)
29 September 2026
19:00 UTC+0

Liberia	0–1	Mali
	Report	Tia 79'

Samuel Kanyon Doe Sports Complex, Monrovia
Referee: Mohamed Guedi (Djibouti)

13 November 2026
17:00 UTC−1

Cape Verde	4–2	Liberia
Santos 5'; Djé 38'; Livramento 43'; Sanches Fernandes 90+1'	Report	Nyenetue 36'; Kosiah 90+5' (pen.)

Estádio Nacional de Cabo Verde, Praia
Referee: Ahmed Abdulrazg (Libya)
13 November 2026
20:00 UTC+0

Mali	3–2	Rwanda
K. Doumbia 43'; Yeo 63'; M. Camara 84'	Report	Kwizera 29'; Kavita 54'

26 March Stadium, Bamako
Referee: Messie Nkounkou (Congo)

17 November 2026
20:00 UTC+0

Liberia	2–0	Cape Verde
Sherman 47'; Nimely 86'	Report

Samuel Kanyon Doe Sports Complex, Monrovia
Referee: Brighton Chimene (Zimbabwe)
17 November 2026
20:00 UTC+2

Rwanda	0–2	Mali
	Report	Sagnan 27'; Diarra 88'

Amahoro Stadium, Kigali
Referee: Lahlou Benbraham (Algeria)

24 March 2027

Cape Verde	v	Mali
	Report

24 March 2027

Liberia	v	Rwanda
	Report

28 March 2027

Mali	v	Liberia
	Report

28 March 2027

Rwanda	v	Cape Verde
	Report

== Goalscorers ==
There have been 27 goals scored in 8 matches, for an average of 3.38 goals per match (as of 17 November 2026).

2 goals

- (Liberia) Sylvanus Nimely
- (Mali) Dorgeles Nene
- (Mali) Ange Martial Tia

1 goal

- (Cape Verde) Gilson Benchimol
- (Cape Verde) Dailon Livramento
- (Cape Verde) Sidny Lopes Cabral
- (Cape Verde) Derensili Sanches Fernandes
- (Cape Verde) Ayoni Santos
- (Cape Verde) Djé Tavares
- (Liberia) Ayouba Kosiah
- (Liberia) Franklin Nyenetue
- (Liberia) Kpah Sherman
- (Mali) Mamadou Camara
- (Mali) Gaoussou Diarra
- (Mali) Kamory Doumbia
- (Mali) Modibo Sagnan
- (Mali) Moussa Yeo
- (Rwanda) Abeddy Biramahire
- (Rwanda) Elie Iradukunda
- (Rwanda) Phanuel Kavita
- (Rwanda) Jojea Kwizera
- (Rwanda) Joy-Lance Mickels
- (Rwanda) Leroy-Jacques Mickels
- (Rwanda) Claude Niyomugabo
