= Ricardo Rocha (footballer, born 1965) =

Brazilian football manager and former player

Personal information
- Full name: Ricardo Cordeiro da Rocha
- Date of birth: 10 July 1965 (age 61)
- Place of birth: São Paulo, Brazil

Senior career*
Years	Team	Apps	(Gls)
- Rioclarense

Managerial career
- 2007: Cape Verde
- * Club domestic league appearances and goals

Ricardo Cordeiro da Rocha (born 10 July 1965 in São Paulo) is a Brazilian football manager and former player.
