= Sidny Lopes Cabral =

Cape Verdean footballer (born 2002)

- Sidny Cabral at the 2026 FIFA World Cup

Personal information
- Date of birth: 18 September 2002 (age 24)
- Place of birth: Rotterdam, Netherlands
- Height: 1.76 m (5 ft 9 in)
- Position: Full-back

Team information
- Current team: Trabzonspor
- Number: 55

Youth career
- RKSV Spartaan'20
- Feyenoord
- 2018–2020: Twente
- 2021–2022: Helsingborg

Senior career*
Years	Team	Apps	(Gls)
2022–2023	Rot-Weiß Erfurt	49	(3)
2024–2025	Viktoria Köln	46	(1)
2025–2026	Estrela da Amadora	15	(5)
2026	Benfica	8	(1)
2026–	Trabzonspor	11	(0)

International career^{‡}
2023–	Cape Verde	15	(5)
- * Club domestic league appearances and goals as of 18:24, 8 November 2026 (UTC) ‡ National team caps and goals as of 20:14, 29 September 2026 (UTC)

Sidny Lopes Cabral (Portuguese: [ˈsid.ni ˈlɔ.pɨʃ kɐ.ˈbɾal]; born 18 September 2002) is a professional footballer who plays as a full-back for Süper Lig club Trabzonspor. Born in the Netherlands, he plays for the Cape Verde national team.

== Early life ==
Lopes Cabral was born in 2002 in the Netherlands. His parents were both from Santiago, Cape Verde. As a youth player, Lopes Cabral joined the youth academy of Swedish side Helsingborg. He was regarded as a bright prospect whilst playing for the club's youth team.

== Club career ==
In 2024, Lopes Cabral signed for German side Viktoria Köln. He was described as a key part of the club's newfound defensive stability.

In the summer of 2025, Lopes Cabral moved to Portugal, signing a three-year contract through to 2028 with Primeira Liga club Estrela da Amadora. He became an offensive weapon for his new club in his debut season, registering five goals and providing two assists in the league, the highlight being a hat-trick scored in a game away at Casa Pia.

After impressing during the first half of the season with Estrela, on 30 December 2025, Lopes Cabral joined fellow Primeira Liga side Benfica, signing a contract until June 2030 for a reported fee of €6 million, which could rise to €8.5 million with add-ons. He made his debut on 4 January 2026, coming on as a substitute during the second half and assisting Vangelis Pavlidis for his hat-trick goal in a 3–1 league victory over Estoril at the Estádio da Luz. On 25 January, Lopes Cabral scored his first goal for Benfica, the third in a 4–0 league victory over his former club Estrela da Amadora.

In June 2026, Benfica agreed to transfer Lopes Cabral to Turkish club Trabzonspor for a reported fee of €10 million, with the player arriving in Turkey to complete the move.

== International career ==
Lopes Cabral was first called up to the Cape Verde national team for a friendly against Comoros in 2023. He scored his first international goal on 29 May 2025, in a friendly against Malaysia at the Kuala Lumpur Stadium.

On 18 May 2026, Lopes Cabral was selected by Cape Verde head coach Bubista for the 2026 FIFA World Cup, the nation's first ever appearance at the tournament. In Cape Verde's round of 32 match against Argentina on 3 July, Lopes Cabral scored a second equalizing goal for his side with a curling shot in the first half of extra time. Although Cape Verde went on to lose the match 3–2, Lopes Cabral's strike would be voted the best goal of the tournament.

== Style of play ==
Lopes Cabral mainly plays as a defender, and can operate as a left-back or right-back.

== Personal life ==
Lopes Cabral's older brother Rodny also played for the Cape Verde national team.

== Career statistics ==
=== Club ===
As of match played 8 November 2026

Appearances and goals by club, season and competition
Club	Season	League			National cup (Note: Includes Taça de Portugal)		League cup (Note: Includes Taça da Liga)		Continental		Other		Total	
Club	Season	Division	Apps	Goals	Apps	Goals	Apps	Goals	Apps	Goals	Apps	Goals	Apps	Goals
Rot-Weiß Erfurt	2021–22	NOFV-Oberliga Süd	11	2	—		—		—		—		11	2
Rot-Weiß Erfurt	2022–23	Regionalliga Nordost	23	1	—		—		—		—		23	1
Rot-Weiß Erfurt	2023–24	Regionalliga Nordost	15	0	—		—		—		3 (Note: Appearances in Thuringian Cup)	0	18	0
Rot-Weiß Erfurt	Total		49	3	—		—		—		3	0	52	3
Viktoria Köln	2023–24	3. Liga	17	0	0	0	—		—		1 (Note: Appearance(s) in Middle Rhine Cup)	0	18	0
Viktoria Köln	2024–25	3. Liga	29	1	—		—		—		3	2	32	3
Viktoria Köln	Total		46	1	0	0	—		—		4	2	50	3
Estrela da Amadora	2025–26	Primeira Liga	15	5	1	0	—		—		—		16	5
Benfica	2025–26	Primeira Liga	8	1	1	0	1	0	2 (Note: Appearances in UEFA Champions League)	0	—		12	1
Trabzonspor	2026–27	Süper Lig	11	0	0	0	—		3 (Note: Two appearances in UEFA Europa League, one appearance in UEFA Conference League)	0	0	0	14	0
Career total			129	10	2	0	1	0	5	0	7	2	144	12

=== International ===
As of match played 29 September 2026

Appearances and goals by national team and year
National team	Year	Apps	Goals
Cape Verde	2023	1	0
Cape Verde	2025	6	2
Cape Verde	2026	8	3
Total		15	5

Scores and results list Cape Verde's goal tally first, score column indicates score after each Lopes Cabral goal.

List of international goals scored by Sidny Lopes Cabral
No.	Date	Venue	Opponent	Score	Result	Competition
1	29 May 2025	Kuala Lumpur Stadium, Kuala Lumpur, Malaysia	Malaysia	1–0	1–1	Friendly
2	8 October 2025	Tripoli Stadium, Tripoli, Libya	Libya	2–3	3–3	2026 FIFA World Cup qualification
3	27 March 2026	Eden Park, Auckland, New Zealand	Chile	2–1	2–4	2026 FIFA Series
4	3 July 2026	Hard Rock Stadium, Miami Gardens, United States	Argentina	2–2	2–3 (a.e.t.)	2026 FIFA World Cup
5	25 September 2026	26 March Stadium, Bamako, Mali	Mali	1–1	1–3	2027 Africa Cup of Nations qualification

== Honours ==
Individual

- FIFA World Cup Goal of the Tournament: 2026
