= Djé Tavares =

Cape Verdean footballer

Personal information
- Full name: José Luís Rocha Tavares
- Date of birth: 2 June 2003 (age 23)
- Place of birth: Calheta, Cape Verde
- Height: 1.78 m (5 ft 10 in)
- Position: Defensive midfielder

Team information
- Current team: Santa Clara
- Number: 8

Senior career*
Years	Team	Apps	(Gls)
2023–2024	Alverca B	27	(1)
2024–	Santa Clara	32	(0)

International career^{‡}
2026–	Cape Verde	3	(1)
- * Club domestic league appearances and goals as of 20 September 2026 ‡ National team caps and goals as of 13 November 2026

José Luís Rocha Tavares (born 2 June 2003), known as Djé Tavares or just Djé, is a Cape Verdean footballer who plays as a defensive midfielder for Primeira Liga club Santa Clara and the Cape Verde national team.

== Club career ==
Born in Calheta, Cape Verde, Djé moved to Portugal as a student. He worked in construction, before deciding to pursue a career in football. He trialed with Estoril, before joining the reserves of Alverca in 2023. He moved to Santa Clara's reserves in 2024, and on 14 November 2025 extended his contract with the club until 2030.

== International career ==
On 25 September 2026, Djé made his debut for the Cape Verde national team in an AFCON qualifier against Mali.

== Career statistics ==
=== Club ===
As of match played 20 September 2026

Appearances and goals by club, season and competition
Club	Season	League			Cup		League Cup		Europe		Total	
Club	Season	Division	Apps	Goals	Apps	Goals	Apps	Goals	Apps	Goals	Apps	Goals
Alverca B	2023–24	Campeonato de Portugal	27	1	—		—		—		27	1
Santa Clara	2025–26	Primeira Liga	25	0	3	0	1	0	0	0	29	0
Santa Clara	2026–27	Primeira Liga	7	0	0	0	0	0	—		7	0
Santa Clara	Total		32	0	3	0	1	0	0	0	36	0
Career total			59	1	3	0	1	0	0	0	63	1

=== International ===
As of match played 13 November 2026

Appearances and goals by national team and year
National team	Year	Apps	Goals
Cape Verde	2026	3	1
Total		3	1

Scores and results list Cape Verde's goal tally first.

List of international goals scored by Djé Tavares
No.	Date	Venue	Opponent	Score	Result	Competition
1.	13 November 2026	Estádio Nacional de Cabo Verde, Praia, Cape Verde	Liberia	2–1	4–2	2027 Africa Cup of Nations qualification
