= Melih Kabasakal =

Turkish footballer (born 1996)

Personal information
- Full name: Melih Kabasakal
- Date of birth: 18 February 1996 (age 30)
- Place of birth: Boyabat, Turkey
- Height: 1.78 m (5 ft 10 in)
- Position: Defensive midfielder

Team information
- Current team: Trabzonspor
- Number: 6

Youth career
- 2007–2011: Boyabat Çeltikspor
- 2011–2014: Samsunspor
- 2014–2016: Trabzonspor

Senior career*
| Years | Team | Apps | (Gls) |
| 2016–2018 | Trabzonspor | 7 | (0) |
| 2016–2017 | → Sarıyer (loan) | 26 | (0) |
| 2017–2018 | → 1461 Trabzon (loan) | 29 | (0) |
| 2018–2020 | Esenler Erokspor | 54 | (2) |
| 2020–2023 | İstanbulspor | 96 | (5) |
| 2023–2025 | Eyüpspor | 73 | (0) |
| 2025–2026 | Gaziantep | 24 | (1) |
| 2026– | Trabzonspor | 1 | (0) |

International career^{‡}
| 2012 | Turkey U16 | 4 | (0) |
| 2026– | Turkey | 1 | (0) |
- * Club domestic league appearances and goals as of 15:56, 20 August 2026 (UTC) ‡ National team caps and goals as of 23:19, 25 September 2026 (UTC)

Melih Kabasakal (born 18 February 1996) is a Turkish professional footballer who plays as a defensive midfielder for Süper Lig club Trabzonspor and the Turkey national team.

== Club career ==
Kabasakal is a youth product of the youth academies of Boyabat Çeltikspor, Samsunspor and Trabzonspor. He began his senior career with Trabzonspor in January 2016 where he was promoted to the senior team. He joined Sarıyer on loan for the 2016–17 season, and 1461 Trabzon for 2017–18. He then spent 2 1/2 seasons with Esenler Erokspor, before transferring to İstanbulspor on 30 January 2020 in the TFF First League. He helped İstanbulspor achieve promotion in the 2021–22 season for the first time in 17 years. He made his professional debut in İstanbulspor's return to the Süper Lig in a 2–0 season opening loss to Trabzonspor on 5 August 2022.

On 16 January 2023, Kabasakal joined Eyüpspor on a 3.5-year contract.

== International career ==
Kabasakal was a youth international for Turkey, having played for the Turkey U16s.

On 25 September 2026, Kabasakal made his debut for the Turkey national team in a 2026–27 UEFA Nations League A game against France.

== Career statistics ==
As of match played 15 August 2026

Appearances and goals by club, season and competition
| Club | Season | League | | | Turkish Cup | | Europe | | Other | | Total | |
| Club | Season | Division | Apps | Goals | Apps | Goals | Apps | Goals | Apps | Goals | Apps | Goals |
|---|---|---|---|---|---|---|---|---|---|---|---|---|
| İstanbulspor | 2019–20 | TFF 1. Lig | 9 | 0 | – | | – | | – | | 9 | 0 |
| İstanbulspor | 2020–21 | TFF 1. Lig | 31 | 0 | 1 | 0 | – | | – | | 32 | 0 |
| İstanbulspor | 2021–22 | TFF 1. Lig | 39 | 4 | 0 | 0 | – | | – | | 39 | 4 |
| İstanbulspor | 2022–23 | Süper Lig | 17 | 1 | 2 | 0 | – | | – | | 19 | 1 |
| İstanbulspor | Total | | 96 | 5 | 3 | 0 | – | | – | | 99 | 5 |
| Eyüpspor | 2022–23 | TFF 1. Lig | 13 | 0 | – | | – | | – | | 13 | 0 |
| Eyüpspor | 2023–24 | TFF 1. Lig | 26 | 0 | 2 | 0 | – | | – | | 28 | 0 |
| Eyüpspor | 2024–25 | Süper Lig | 31 | 0 | 3 | 0 | – | | – | | 34 | 0 |
| Eyüpspor | 2025–26 | Süper Lig | 3 | 0 | – | | – | | – | | 3 | 0 |
| Eyüpspor | Total | | 73 | 0 | 5 | 0 | – | | – | | 78 | 0 |
| Gaziantep | 2025–26 | Süper Lig | 24 | 1 | 3 | 0 | – | | – | | 27 | 1 |
| Trabzonspor | 2026–27 | Süper Lig | 1 | 0 | 0 | 0 | 0 | 0 | 0 | 0 | 1 | 0 |
| Career total | | | 194 | 6 | 11 | 0 | 0 | 0 | 0 | 0 | 205 | 6 |
