= Abeddy Biramahire =

Rwandan footballer (born 1998)

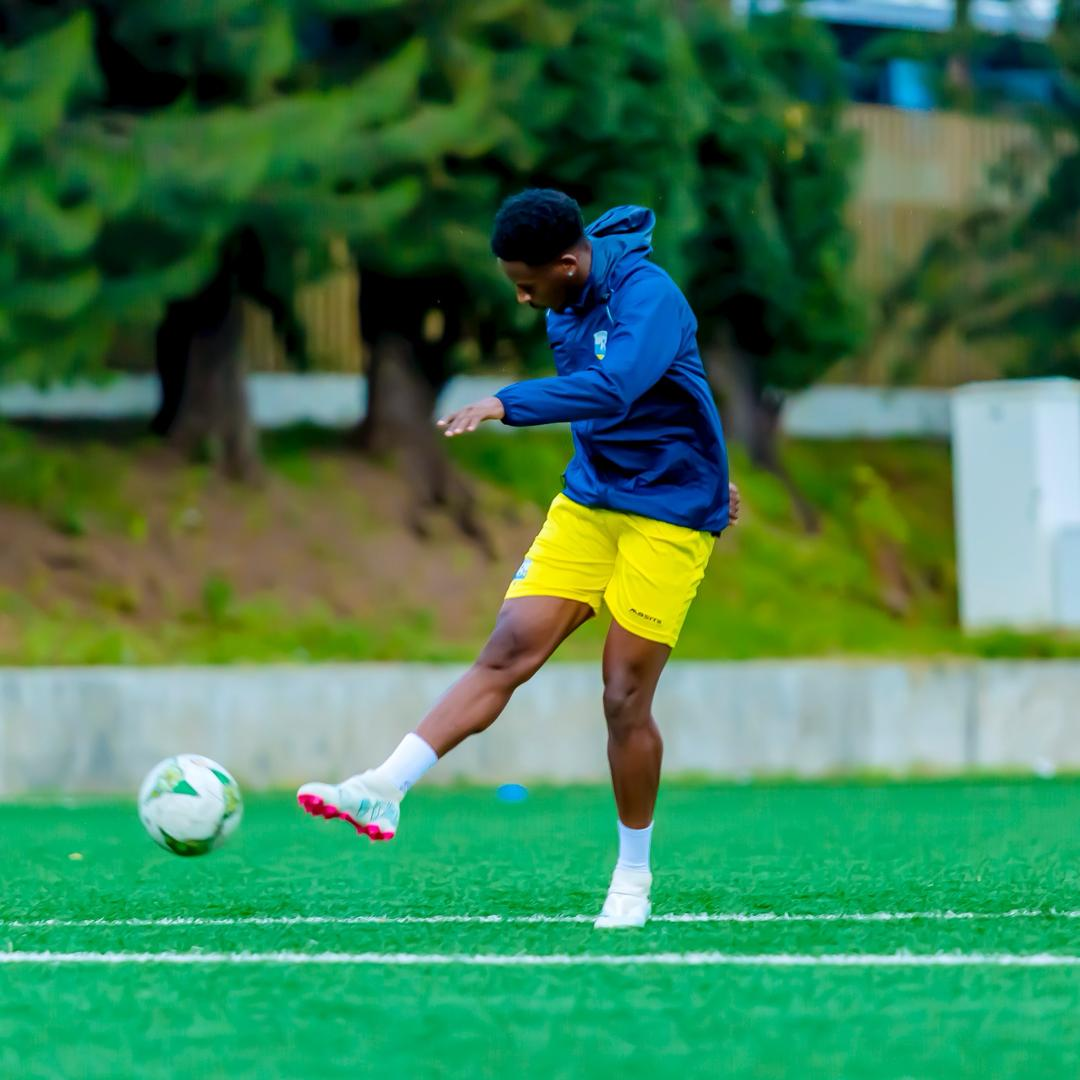

Personal information
- Date of birth: 4 October 1998 (age 28)
- Place of birth: Kigali, Rwanda
- Height: 1.78 m (5 ft 10 in)
- Position: Midfielder

Youth career
- Heroes Fc

Senior career*
| Years | Team | Apps | (Gls) |
| 2015–2016 | Bugesera FC | 0 | (0) |
| 2017–2018 | Police FC | 14 | (10) |
| 2018-2019 | CS Sfaxien | 0 | (0) |
| 2019 | Mukura Victory | 0 | (0) |
| 2019–2020 | Buildcon | 2 | (2) |
| 2020–2022 | AS Kigali | 3 | (3) |
| 2022–2023 | Suwaiq Club | 0 | (0) |
| 2023–2024 | UD Songo | 0 | (0) |
| 2024 | → Ferroviário (loan) | 1 | (1) |
| 2025 | Rayon Sports | 3 | (4) |
| 2025 | ES Sétif | 10 | (1) |

International career^{‡}
| 2017– | Rwanda | 20 | (4) |
- * Club domestic league appearances and goals as of 29 September 2025 ‡ National team caps and goals as of 25 September 2026

Abeddy Biramahire (born 4 October 1998) is a Rwandan international footballer who plays for Al-Batin Football Club in Saudi Arabia.

== Club career ==
Biramahire was born in Kigali, Rwanda, and began his football career in the second division, signing with Heroes Football Club. Biramahire's performances earned him a transfer to Bugesera FC, his performance earned him a spot in the Junior Amavubi U-20 National team.

Biramahire's breakthrough in Rwandan football came after signing for Police Fc in 2017, in the 2016/2017 season of the Rwanda Premier League. At the age of 20, He was awarded the Best Young Promising Player for his skills and dedication on the field, this also earned him recognition and a spot in Rwanda's national team Amavubi in the 2018 CHAN (African Nations Championship) squad in Morocco.

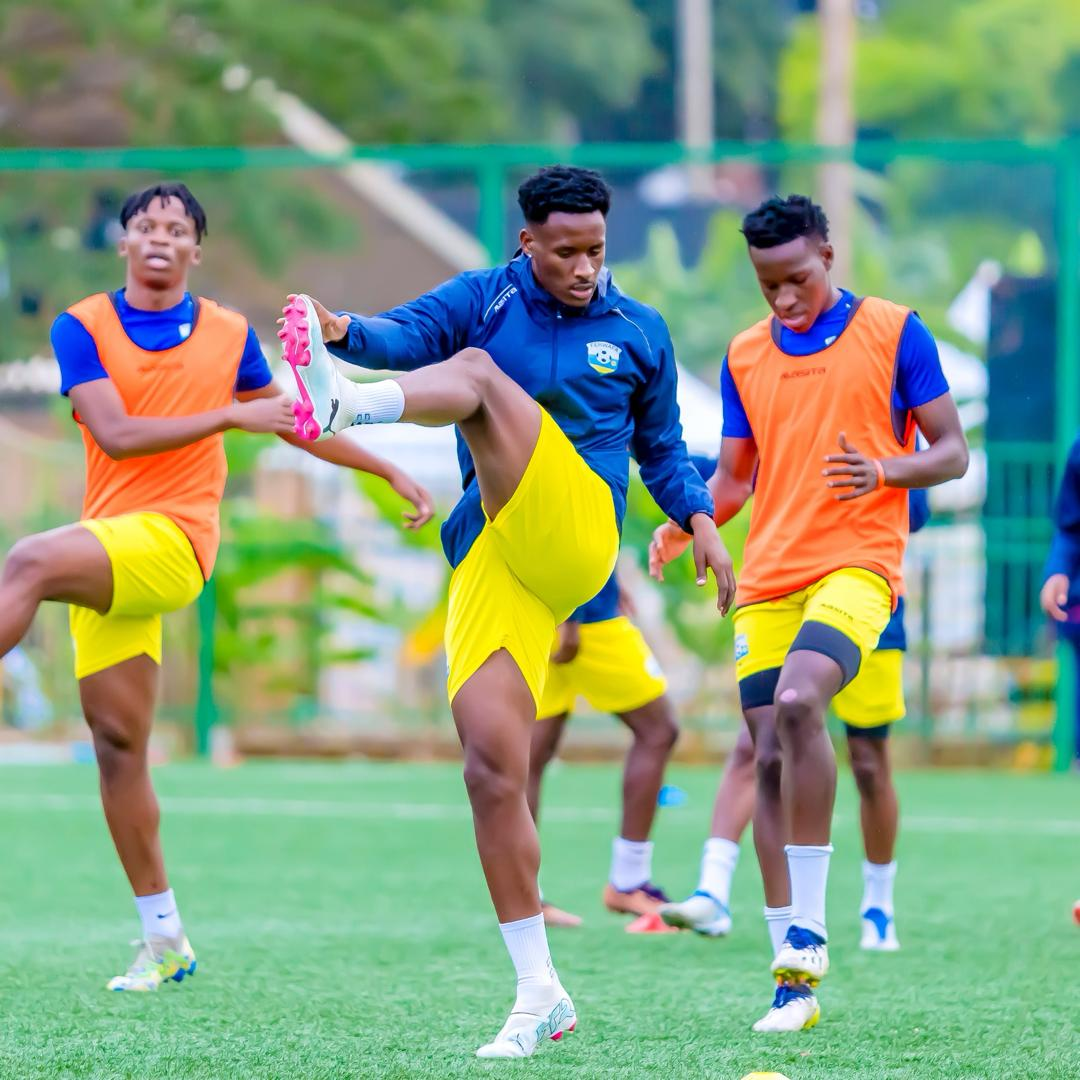

Biramahire played a pivotal role in securing a commendable second-place finish in the season, after narrowly missing out on the championship title to APR FC. In 2018, he transferred to Club Sportif Sfaxien following another Rwanda-Tunisia transfer by Nshuti Innocent from APR FC to Stade Tunisien in the same year.

=== International goals ===
Scores and results list Rwanda's goal tally first.

| No. | Date | Venue | Opponent | Score | Result | Competition |
|---|---|---|---|---|---|---|
| 1. | 5 November 2017 | Addis Ababa Stadium, Addis Ababa, Ethiopia | Ethiopia | 3–2 | 3–2 | 2020 African Nations Championship |
| 2. | 9 December 2017 | Kenyatta Stadium, Machakos, Kenya | Tanzania | 2–1 | 2–1 | 2017 CECAFA Cup |
| 3. | 30 March 2026 | Amahoro Stadium, Kigali, Rwanda | Estonia | 1–0 | 2–0 | 2026 FIFA Series |
| 4. | 25 September 2026 | Amahoro Stadium, Kigali, Rwanda | Liberia | 1–0 | 3–1 | 2027 Africa Cup of Nations qualification |
