= Noah Saviolo =

Portuguese footballer (born 2004)

Personal information
- Full name: Noah José Damesquita E Melo Saviolo
- Date of birth: 7 March 2004 (age 22)
- Place of birth: Brussels, Belgium
- Height: 1.81 m (5 ft 11 in)
- Position: Winger

Team information
- Current team: Trabzonspor
- Number: 70

Youth career
- Anderlecht
- 2021–2022: Lille
- 2022–2024: Vitória

Senior career*
| Years | Team | Apps | (Gls) |
| 2024–2025 | Vitória B | 8 | (2) |
| 2025–2026 | Vitória | 30 | (2) |
| 2026– | Trabzonspor | 1 | (1) |

International career^{‡}
| 2019 | Belgium U15 | 1 | (0) |
| 2021 | DR Congo U20 | 1 | (0) |
| 2026– | Portugal U21 | 1 | (0) |
- * Club domestic league appearances and goals as of 15 August 2026 ‡ National team caps and goals as of 13:25, 27 October 2025 (UTC)

Noah José Damesquita E Melo Saviolo (born 7 March 2004) is a professional football player who plays as a winger for Süper Lig club Trabzonspor. Born in Belgium, he is a youth international for Portugal.

== Club career ==
A product of the youth academy of the Belgian club Anderlecht, he joined the French club Lille's youth side on 9 June 2021. On 26 August 2022, he moved to Portugal with Vitória's youth academy where he finished his development. He was promoted to Vitória B in 2024 and helped them achieve promotion to the Liga 3. On 21 June 2025, he signed a professional contract with Vitória until 2028 and was promoted to their senior team. On 14 September 2025, he debuted with the senior Vitória team in a 2–0 Primeira Liga win over Estrela da Amadora, where he assisted the second goal. He was named Primaira Young Player of the Month for December 2025. On 10 January 2026, Saviolo played in the Portuguese Taça da Liga final against Braga in which Vitória Guimarães won 2–1.

== International career ==
Born in Belgium, Saviolo is of Angolan and Congolese descent. He holds Belgian and Portuguese citizenship. He is a youth international for Belgium, having played for the Belgium U15s once in 2019. He was called up to the DR Congo U20s for a friendly match in December 2021. He was called up to the Portugal U21s for a set of 2027 UEFA European Under-21 Championship qualification matches in March 2026.

== Career statistics ==
As of match played 15 August 2026

Appearances and goals by club, season and competition
| Club | Season | League | | | National cup (Note: Includes Taça de Portugal) | | League cup (Note: Includes Taça da Liga) | | Europe | | Other | | Total | |
| Club | Season | Division | Apps | Goals | Apps | Goals | Apps | Goals | Apps | Goals | Apps | Goals | Apps | Goals |
|---|---|---|---|---|---|---|---|---|---|---|---|---|---|---|
| Vitória | 2025–26 | Primeira Liga | 30 | 2 | 3 | 0 | 3 | 0 | – | | – | | 36 | 2 |
| Trabzonspor | 2026–27 | Süper Lig | 1 | 1 | 0 | 0 | – | | 0 | 0 | 0 | 0 | 1 | 1 |
| Career total | | | 31 | 3 | 3 | 0 | 3 | 0 | 0 | 0 | 0 | 0 | 37 | 3 |

== Honours ==
Vitória SC

- Taça da Liga: 2025–26
