= Erman Yıldırım =

Turkish footballer

Personal information
- Date of birth: 26 February 1986 (age 40)
- Place of birth: İzmir, Turkey
- Height: 1.86 m (6 ft 1 in)
- Position: Defender

Youth career
- 1998–2000: Gaziantepspor
- 2000–2003: Fenerbahçe

Senior career*
Years	Team	Apps	(Gls)
2003–2005	Fenerbahçe	3	(0)
2003–2004	→Antalyaspor (loan)	4	(0)
2004–2005	→Mardinspor (loan)	20	(2)
2005–2006	Mardinspor	18	(0)
2006–2007	Adana Demirspor	26	(2)
2007–2008	Güngörenspor	11	(1)
2008–2012	Akhisarspor	71	(11)
2012	Yeni Malatyaspor	16	(3)
2012–2013	Vanspor	9	(0)

International career^{‡}
1998–1999	Turkey U15	1	(0)
1999–2000	Turkey U16	22	(1)
2000–2001	Turkey U17	9	(0)
2001	Turkey U19	1	(0)
2002–2003	Turkey U20	3	(0)
- * Club domestic league appearances and goals as of 20:17, 4 April 2021 (UTC) ‡ National team caps and goals as of 20:17, 4 April 2021 (UTC)

Erman Yıldırım (born 26 February 1986) is a Turkish former professional footballer who played as a defender.

Yıldırım was a youth product of Gaziantepspor and Fenerbahçe. He a was part of the Fenerbahçe squad that won 6–0 against Galatasaray on 6 November 2002, their record win over their rivals. He spent the rest of his career in various professional and semi-professional clubs in Turkey. He represented Turkey as a youth international 49 times.
