= Ahmet Doğan Yıldırım =

Turkish footballer (born 2006)

Personal information
- Date of birth: 1 November 2006 (age 20)
- Place of birth: Karasu, Sakarya, Turkey
- Height: 1.93 m (6 ft 4 in)
- Position: Goalkeeper

Team information
- Current team: Trabzonspor
- Number: 1

Youth career
- 2017–2021: Sakaryaspor
- 2021–2026: Trabzonspor

Senior career*
Years	Team	Apps	(Gls)
2026–	Trabzonspor	1	(0)
- * Club domestic league appearances and goals as of 00:01, 16 August 2026 (UTC)

Ahmet Doğan Yıldırım (born 1 November 2006) is a Turkish footballer who plays as a goalkeeper for the Süper Lig club Trabzonspor.

== Club career ==
Yıldırım is a product of the youth academies of the Turkish clubs Sakaryaspor and Trabzonspor. On 7 August 2024, he signed his first professional contract with Trabzonspor.
