= List of international goals scored by Sadio Mané =

International goals by Sadio Mané

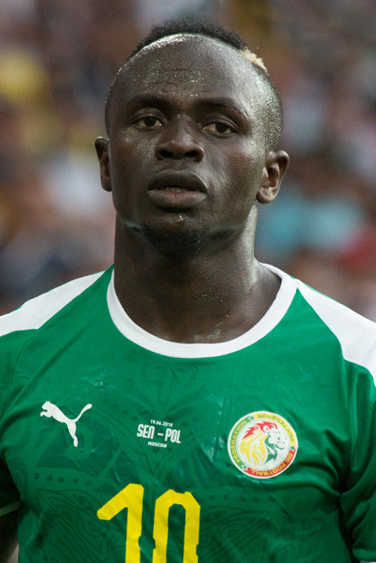
Mané with Senegal at the 2018 FIFA World Cup

Sadio Mané is a Senegalese professional footballer who represents the Senegal national team as a forward. Since making his debut against Liberia on 2 June 2012, Mané has scored 56 goals in 134 international appearances, making him the country's all-time top scorer; he surpassed Henri Camara's previous record of 29 goals with a hat-trick against Benin in the 2023 Africa Cup of Nations qualification on 4 June 2022.

== Goals ==
Senegal score listed first, score column indicates score after each Mané goal.

International goals by cap, date, venue, opponent, score, result and competition
No.	Date	Venue	Cap	Opponent	Score	Result	Competition	Ref.
1	2 June 2012	Stade Léopold Sédar Senghor, Dakar, Senegal	2	Liberia	3–1	3–1	2014 FIFA World Cup qualification	
2	14 November 2012	Stade Général Seyni Kountché, Niamey, Niger	6	Niger	1–1	1–1	Friendly	
3	7 September 2013	Stade de Marrakech, Marrakesh, Morocco	12	Uganda	1–0	1–0	2014 FIFA World Cup qualification	
4	5 March 2014	Stade Municipal Saint-Leu-la-Forêt, Saint-Leu-la-Forêt, France	15	Mali	1–0	1–1	Friendly	
5	5 September 2014	Stade Léopold Sédar Senghor, Dakar, Senegal	18	Egypt	2–0	2–0	2015 Africa Cup of Nations qualification	
6	10 September 2014	Botswana National Stadium, Gaborone, Botswana	19	Botswana	1–0	2–0	2015 Africa Cup of Nations qualification	
7	13 June 2015	Stade Léopold Sédar Senghor, Dakar, Senegal	27	Burundi	3–1	3–1	2017 Africa Cup of Nations qualification	
8	5 September 2015	Sam Nujoma Stadium, Windhoek, Namibia	28	Namibia	2–0	2–0	2017 Africa Cup of Nations qualification	
9	13 November 2015	Mahamasina Municipal Stadium, Antananarivo, Madagascar	31	Madagascar	2–2	2–2	2018 FIFA World Cup qualification	
10	4 June 2016	Prince Louis Rwagasore Stadium, Bujumbura, Burundi	36	Burundi	1–0	2–0	2017 Africa Cup of Nations qualification	
11	15 January 2017	Stade de Franceville, Franceville, Gabon	41	Tunisia	1–0	2–0	2017 Africa Cup of Nations	
12	19 January 2017	Stade de Franceville, Franceville, Gabon	42	Zimbabwe	1–0	2–0	2017 Africa Cup of Nations	
13	27 March 2017	Stade Sébastien Charléty, Paris, France	45	Ivory Coast	1–0	1–1	Friendly	
14	5 September 2017	Stade du 4 Août, Ouagadougou, Burkina Faso	47	Burkina Faso	2–2	2–2	2018 FIFA World Cup qualification	
15	24 June 2018	Central Stadium, Yekaterinburg, Russia	54	Japan	1–0	2–2	2018 FIFA World Cup	
16	26 March 2019	Stade Léopold Sédar Senghor, Dakar, Senegal	60	Mali	1–1	2–1	Friendly	
17	1 July 2019	30 June Stadium, Cairo, Egypt	62	Kenya	2–0	3–0	2019 Africa Cup of Nations	
18	1 July 2019	30 June Stadium, Cairo, Egypt	62	Kenya	3–0	3–0	2019 Africa Cup of Nations	
19	5 July 2019	Cairo International Stadium, Cairo, Egypt	63	Uganda	1–0	1–0	2019 Africa Cup of Nations	
20	11 November 2020	Stade Lat-Dior, Thiès, Senegal	70	Guinea-Bissau	1–0	2–0	2021 Africa Cup of Nations qualification	
21	15 November 2020	Estádio 24 de Setembro, Bissau, Guinea-Bissau	71	Guinea-Bissau	1–0	1–0	2021 Africa Cup of Nations qualification	
22	5 June 2021	Stade Lat-Dior, Thiès, Senegal	74	Zambia	1–0	3–1	Friendly	
23	8 June 2021	Stade Lat-Dior, Thiès, Senegal	75	Cape Verde	2–0	2–0	Friendly	
24	1 September 2021	Stade Lat-Dior, Thiès, Senegal	76	Togo	1–0	2–0	2022 FIFA World Cup qualification	
25	7 September 2021	Stade Alphonse Massamba-Débat, Brazzaville, Republic of the Congo	77	Congo	3–1	3–1	2022 FIFA World Cup qualification	
26	9 October 2021	Stade Lat-Dior, Thiès, Senegal	78	Namibia	3–0	4–1	2022 FIFA World Cup qualification	
27	10 January 2022	Kouekong Stadium, Bafoussam, Cameroon	81	Zimbabwe	1–0	1–0	2021 Africa Cup of Nations	
28	25 January 2022	Kouekong Stadium, Bafoussam, Cameroon	84	Cape Verde	1–0	2–0	2021 Africa Cup of Nations	
29	2 February 2022	Ahmadou Ahidjo Stadium, Yaoundé, Cameroon	86	Burkina Faso	3–1	3–1	2021 Africa Cup of Nations	
30	4 June 2022	Diamniadio Olympic Stadium, Diamniadio, Senegal	90	Benin	1–0	3–1	2023 Africa Cup of Nations qualification	
31	4 June 2022	Diamniadio Olympic Stadium, Diamniadio, Senegal	90	Benin	2–0	3–1	2023 Africa Cup of Nations qualification	
32	4 June 2022	Diamniadio Olympic Stadium, Diamniadio, Senegal	90	Benin	3–0	3–1	2023 Africa Cup of Nations qualification	
33	7 June 2022	Diamniadio Olympic Stadium, Diamniadio, Senegal	91	Rwanda	1–0	1–0	2023 Africa Cup of Nations qualification	
34	24 September 2022	Stade de la Source, Orléans, France	92	Bolivia	2–0	2–0	Friendly	
35	24 March 2023	Diamniadio Olympic Stadium, Diamniadio, Senegal	94	Mozambique	2–0	5–1	2023 Africa Cup of Nations qualification	
36	20 June 2023	Estádio José Alvalade, Lisbon, Portugal	97	Brazil	3–1	4–2	Friendly	
37	20 June 2023	Estádio José Alvalade, Lisbon, Portugal	97	Brazil	4–2	4–2	Friendly	
38	16 October 2023	Stade Bollaert-Delelis, Lens, France	99	Cameroon	1–0	1–0	Friendly	
39	18 November 2023	Diamniadio Olympic Stadium, Diamniadio, Senegal	100	South Sudan	2–0	4–0	2026 FIFA World Cup qualification	
40	18 November 2023	Diamniadio Olympic Stadium, Diamniadio, Senegal	100	South Sudan	4–0	4–0	2026 FIFA World Cup qualification	
41	19 January 2024	Charles Konan Banny Stadium, Yamoussoukro, Ivory Coast	103	Cameroon	3–1	3–1	2023 Africa Cup of Nations	
42	22 March 2024	Stade de la Licorne, Amiens, France	106	Gabon	3–0	3–0	Friendly	
43	26 March 2024	Stade de la Licorne, Amiens, France	107	Benin	1–0	1–0	Friendly	
44	6 September 2024	Diamniadio Olympic Stadium, Diamniadio, Senegal	108	Burkina Faso	1–0	1–1	2025 Africa Cup of Nations qualification	
45	11 October 2024	Diamniadio Olympic Stadium, Diamniadio, Senegal	110	Malawi	2–0	4–0	2025 Africa Cup of Nations qualification	
46	15 October 2024	Bingu National Stadium, Lilongwe, Malawi	111	Malawi	1–0	1–0	2025 Africa Cup of Nations qualification	
47	10 October 2025	Juba Stadium, Juba, South Sudan	118	South Sudan	2–0	5–0	2026 FIFA World Cup qualification	
48	14 October 2025	Diamniadio Olympic Stadium, Diamniadio, Senegal	119	Mauritania	1–0	4–0	2026 FIFA World Cup qualification	
49	14 October 2025	Diamniadio Olympic Stadium, Diamniadio, Senegal	119	Mauritania	2–0	4–0	2026 FIFA World Cup qualification	
50	18 November 2025	Antalya Stadium, Antalya, Turkey	121	Kenya	4–0	8–0	Friendly	
51	18 November 2025	Antalya Stadium, Antalya, Turkey	121	Kenya	5–0	8–0	Friendly	
52	18 November 2025	Antalya Stadium, Antalya, Turkey	121	Kenya	6–0	8–0	Friendly	
53	27 December 2025	Tangier Grand Stadium, Tangier, Morocco	123	DR Congo	1–1	1–1	2025 Africa Cup of Nations	
54	14 January 2026	Tangier Grand Stadium, Tangier, Morocco	127	Egypt	1–0	1–0	2025 Africa Cup of Nations	
55	31 May 2026	Bank of America Stadium, Charlotte, United States	129	United States	1–2	2–3	Friendly	
56	31 May 2026	Bank of America Stadium, Charlotte, United States	129	United States	2–2	2–3	Friendly	

== Hat-tricks ==
No.	Opponent	Goals	Score	Venue	Competition	Date
1	Benin	3 – (1–0', 2–0', 3–0')	3–1	Diamniadio Olympic Stadium, Diamniadio, Senegal	2023 Africa Cup of Nations qualification	4 June 2022
2	Kenya	3 – (4–0', 5–0', 6–0')	8–0	Antalya Stadium, Antalya, Turkey	Friendly	18 November 2025

== Statistics ==
As of match played 1 July 2026

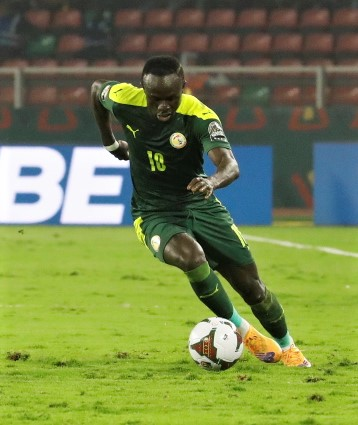
Mané playing for Senegal at the 2021 Africa Cup of Nations

Appearances and goals by national team and year
National team	Year	Apps	Goals
Senegal	2012	6	2
Senegal	2013	8	1
Senegal	2014	9	3
Senegal	2015	9	3
Senegal	2016	7	1
Senegal	2017	10	4
Senegal	2018	9	1
Senegal	2019	11	4
Senegal	2020	2	2
Senegal	2021	9	5
Senegal	2022	13	8
Senegal	2023	8	6
Senegal	2024	12	6
Senegal	2025	11	7
Senegal	2026	10	3
Total		134	56

== See also ==
- List of top international men's football goalscorers by country
- List of men's footballers with 50 or more international goals
