= Ahmed Dabo =

Mauritanian footballer (born 1973)

Personal information
- Date of birth: 13 July 1973 (age 53)
- Place of birth: Mauritania
- Position: Striker

Senior career*
Years	Team	Apps	(Gls)
1994–1995	Limoges FC		
1995–1997	Blagnac FC	32	(5)
1997–1998	US Albi		
1998–1999	Dijon FCO	9	(6)
1999–2000	FC Gueugnon B		
2000–2001	US Lusitanos Saint-Maur	20	(1)
2001–2002	ASOA Valence	20	(3)
2002	Montluçon Football		
2003–2004	AS Choisy-le-Roi		
2004–2007	FC Fleury 91		

International career
2001–2003	Mauritania	5	(1)
- * Club domestic league appearances and goals

Ahmed Dabo (born 13 July 1973) is a Mauritanian former footballer who played as a striker.

== Career ==
In 1997, Dabo signed for French side US Albi. He was regarded as one of the club's most important players.

== Style of play ==
Dabo mainly operated as a striker. He was known for his strength.

== Personal life ==
Dabo was born in 1973 in Mauritania. He has studied to become a manager.

== Career statistics ==
=== International ===
Appearances and goals by national team and year
National team	Year	Apps	Goals
Mauritania	2001	2	1
Mauritania	2002	1	0
Mauritania	2003	2	0
Total		5	1

Scores and results list Mauritania's goal tally first, score column indicates score after each Dabo goal.

List of international goals scored by Ahmed Dabo
No.	Date	Venue	Opponent	Score	Result	Competition
1	3 November 2001	Stade du 26 Mars, Bamako, Mali	Mali	2–3	2–3	2001 Amílcar Cabral Cup
