= 2001 Amílcar Cabral Cup =

Tournament details
- Host country: Mali
- Dates: November 3–11
- Teams: 6
- Venue(s): (in 3 host cities)

Final positions
- Champions: Senegal (U-23 Team) (3rd title)
- Runners-up: Gambia
- Third place: Mali

Tournament statistics
- Matches played: 10
- Goals scored: 28 (2.8 per match)
- Best player(s): Ousmane N'Doye (Senegal)

The 2001 Amílcar Cabral Cup was held in Mali. The title was won by Senegal (U-23 Team).

== Group stage ==
=== Group A ===
Team	Pts	Pld	W	D	L	GF	GA	GD
Mali	6	2	2	0	0	5	2	+3
Guinea-Bissau	3	2	1	0	1	1	2	–1
Mauritania	0	2	0	0	2	2	4	–2

November 3, 2001

Mali	3 – 2	Mauritania
Brahima Traoré 11', 28'; Cheick Oumar Dabo 12'		Bilal Sidibé 48'; Ahmed Dabo 55'

Bamako
November 5, 2001

Mali	2 – 0	Guinea-Bissau
Cheick Oumar Dabo 17'; Yaya Dissa 25'

Ségou
November 7, 2001

Guinea-Bissau	1 – 0	Mauritania
Fernando Manuel Co 49' (pen.)

Ségou

=== Group B ===
Team	Pts	Pld	W	D	L	GF	GA	GD
Senegal (U-23 Team)	4	2	1	1	0	6	2	+4
Gambia	2	2	0	2	0	2	2	0
Cape Verde	1	2	0	1	1	2	6	–4
Sierra Leone	withdrew							

November 3, 2001

Gambia	1 – 1	Senegal (U-23 Team)
Arthur Gómez		Abdoulaye Khouma Keita 20'

Sikasso
November 5, 2001

Cape Verde	1 – 5	Senegal (U-23 Team)
Zé di Luisinho 46'		Sadio Cissokho 18' (pen.); Ousmane N'Doye 47'; Mamadou Diabang 61'; Abdoulaye Khouma Keita 78'; Ibrahima Diédhiou 84'

Sikasso
November 7, 2001

Cape Verde	1 – 1	Gambia
Marcelino José 45'		Baye Oumar Samba 70'

Sikasso

== Knockout stage ==
=== Semi-finals ===
November 9, 2001

Mali	0 – 1	Gambia
		Edrissa Sonko 69'

Ségou
November 9, 2001

(U-23 Team) Senegal	2 – 0	Guinea-Bissau
Mamadou Diabang 38'; Ousmane N'Doye 45'

Sikasso

=== Third place match ===
November 11, 2001

Mali	2 – 1	Guinea-Bissau
Tenema N'Diaye 17'; Cheick Oumar Dabo 62'		Alberto José Té 72'

Bamako

=== Final ===
November 11, 2001

(U-23 Team) Senegal	3 – 1	Gambia
Ousmane N'Doye 43' (pen.), 83'; Abdoulaye Khouma Keita 64'		Souleymane Faye 90+3'

Bamako
