= Senegal national football team =

Men's association football team

Senegal
- Nickname(s): Lions de la Téranga (Lions of Teranga)
- Association: Fédération Sénégalaise de Football (FSF)
- Confederation: CAF (Africa)
- Sub-confederation: WAFU (West Africa)
- Head coach: Patrick Vieira
- Captain: Kalidou Koulibaly
- Most caps: Idrissa Gueye (143)
- Top scorer: Sadio Mané (56)
- Home stadium: Diamniadio Olympic Stadium
- FIFA code: SEN
First colours	Second colours

FIFA ranking
- Current: 18 (18 November 2026)
- Highest: 12 (January 2026)
- Lowest: 99 (June 2013)

First international
- Pre-independence: British Gambia 1–2 French Senegal (The Gambia; 1959); Post-independence: Dahomey 3–2 Senegal (31 December 1961)

Biggest win
- Senegal 10–1 Mauritania (Dakar, Senegal; 28 September 1972)

Biggest defeat
- Czechoslovakia 11–0 Senegal (Prague, Czechoslovakia; 2 November 1966)

World Cup
- Appearances: 4 (first in 2002)
- Best result: Quarter-finals (2002)

Africa Cup of Nations
- Appearances: 18 (first in 1965)
- Best result: Champions (2021)

African Nations Championship
- Appearances: 4 (first in 2009)
- Best result: Champions (2022)

Amílcar Cabral Cup
- Appearances: 19 (first in 1979)
- Best result: Champions (1979, 1980, 1983, 1984, 1985, 1986, 1991, 2001)
Medal record
Africa Cup of Nations
Gold medal – first place	2021 Cameroon	Team
Silver medal – second place	2025 Morocco	Team
Silver medal – second place	2019 Egypt	Team
Silver medal – second place	2002 Mali	Team
African Nations Championship
Gold medal – first place	2022 Algeria	Team
Bronze medal – third place	2024 Kenya, Tanzania and Uganda	Team
Amílcar Cabral Cup
Gold medal – first place	1979 Guinea-Bissau	Team
Gold medal – first place	1980 Gambia	Team
Gold medal – first place	1983 Mauritania	Team
Gold medal – first place	1984 Sierra Leone	Team
Gold medal – first place	1985 Gambia	Team
Gold medal – first place	1986 Senegal	Team
Gold medal – first place	1991 Senegal	Team
Silver medal – second place	1982 Cape Verde	Team
Silver medal – second place	1993 Sierra Leone	Team
Silver medal – second place	1997 Gambia	Team
Silver medal – second place	2000 Cape Verde	Team
Bronze medal – third place	1981 Mali	Team
Bronze medal – third place	1987 Guinea	Team
Bronze medal – third place	1988 Guinea-Bissau	Team
WAFU Nations Cup
Gold medal – first place	2019 Senegal	Team
Silver medal – second place	2010 Nigeria	Team
Silver medal – second place	2013 Ghana	Team
COSAFA Cup
Silver medal – second place	2021 South Africa	Team
Bronze medal – third place	2022 South Africa	Team

The Senegal national football team (French: Équipe de football du Sénégal), nicknamed Les Lions de la Teranga (English: The Lions of Teranga), represents Senegal in men's international association football and is operated by the Senegalese Football Federation.

One of Africa's most famous national football teams, Senegal reached the quarter-finals of the 2002 FIFA World Cup, the second team from Africa to do so (after Cameroon in 1990). They managed to upset defending world champions France, finish second in their group, and beat Sweden in extra time in the round of 16, before losing to Turkey in the quarter-finals.

Senegal has won one Africa Cup of Nations title, in 2021. Their first appearance in the competition was in 1965, when they lost 1–0 to Ivory Coast for fourth place. They hosted the 1992 African Cup of Nations, where they made it to the quarter-finals, and finished as runners-up in 2002, 2019, and 2025.

== History ==
=== Early history ===
Senegal gained its independence from France on 4 April 1960, and the Senegalese Football Federation (FSF) was founded that year. The first Senegal match took place on 31 December 1961 against Dahomey (now Benin), a 3–2 loss. The FSF has been affiliated with FIFA since 1962 and has been a member of the Confederation of African Football (CAF) since 1963. Senegal's first appearance in the Africa Cup of Nations was in 1965, where they finished second in their group, and lost 1–0 to Ivory Coast to finish in fourth place. After a group stage exit at the AFCON three years later, they would not qualify for the tournament until 1986.

=== 1990s and 2000s ===
In the 1990 Africa Cup of Nations, Senegal finished fourth; they hosted the 1992 tournament, where after finishing second in their group, they were eliminated by Cameroon in the quarterfinals. Senegal lost the 2002 final on a penalty shoot-out after drawing 0–0 with Cameroon. Later that year, Senegal made their debut appearance at the World Cup. After defeating defending world champions France in their opening game, they drew with Denmark and Uruguay to progress from the group stage, then beat Sweden in extra time in the round of 16 to reach the quarter-finals, one of only four African teams to do so (alongside Cameroon in 1990, Ghana in 2010 and Morocco in 2022). There, they lost to Turkey in extra time.

Senegal qualified for the 2008 Africa Cup of Nations, but finished third in their group with two points. They failed to make the 2010 FIFA World Cup in South Africa, the first World Cup to be held in Africa.

=== 2010s ===
Senegal was eliminated from the 2012 Africa Cup of Nations with zero wins and zero points.

After former manager Bruno Metsu died on 14 October 2013, many Senegalese players were recalled to appear and have a moment of silence in memory of the manager who helped them reach the quarter-final in the 2002 World Cup. All activities of the national league and the national team were suspended for a few days in his memory.

The West African nation narrowly missed the 2014 FIFA World Cup after losing in a round-robin match against Ivory Coast in the final qualification round. Senegal qualified for two Africa Cup of Nations tournaments before the next World Cup, being eliminated in the group stage in 2015 and reaching the quarterfinals in 2017. On 10 November 2017, after defeating South Africa 2–0, Senegal qualified for the 2018 FIFA World Cup, their first since 2002. Senegal defeated Poland 2–1 in their opening group match, thanks to an own goal by Thiago Cionek and a M'Baye Niang strike. In the next group stage match, Senegal drew 2–2 against Japan, with goals from Sadio Mané and Moussa Wagué. A 1–0 loss to Colombia in their final match meant they finished level on points with Japan, who progressed thanks to a superior fair play record. Thus, Senegal was eliminated in the group stage for the first time in its World Cup history.

Aliou Cissé, who participated in the 2002 AFCON, managed Senegal to a runner-up campaign in the 2019 Africa Cup of Nations. Having lost 1–0 to Algeria earlier in the tournament, Senegal lost 1–0 to them again in the final.

=== 2020s ===
Deprived of many players due to COVID-19, Senegal participated in the 2021 Africa Cup of Nations, postponed to 2022 because of the pandemic; they beat Zimbabwe in their first match 1–0 and drew their next two games, enough to finish first in their group. In the round of 16, Senegal faced Cape Verde. Mané recorded a shot that hit the post in the first minute. Patrick Andrade was sent off in the 21st minute, after intervention of the video assistant referee. Despite their dominance, the first half ended without a single shot on target; Mané opened the scoring a few minutes into the second half, following a corner.

Senegal faced Equatorial Guinea in the quarter-finals. The Lions opened the scoring half an hour into the game, by Famara Diédhiou on a pass from Mané; Senegal eventually won 3–1. In the semi-finals, Senegal faced Burkina Faso, winning 3–1 again. In the final, Senegal faced Egypt, who eliminated hosts Cameroon in the semi-finals. In a penalty shoot-out, Mané scored the winning penalty, to bring Senegal its first Africa Cup of Nations title. Senegal returned home and took part in a victory parade that took place in the capital, Dakar. During the 2021 Africa Cup of Nations final, Egyptian goalkeeper Mohamed Abou Gabal, known as Gabaski, used a water bottle with notes indicating the preferred penalty shot directions of Senegalese players. It ended up becoming the biggest party in the country's history.

Senegal faced Egypt twice after the AFCON final, eliminating the Egyptians on penalties after being tied 1–1 on aggregate, to qualify for the 2022 FIFA World Cup. Mané eliminated his Liverpool teammate Mohamed Salah after scoring the winning penalty again. The penalty shoot-out was however full of controversies with lasers being pointed at Egypt's penalty takers and goalkeeper. FIFA fined Senegal's football federation 175,000 Swiss francs as a result of the fan disorder.

For the 2022 World Cup in Qatar, Senegal were drawn in Group A along with the hosts Qatar, Ecuador and the Netherlands. Star man Mané missed out due to injury, but Senegal managed to progress from the group nonetheless. Though they lost their first game against the Netherlands 2–0, Senegal went on to claim six points against the hosts and then Ecuador in their final game, progressing to the Round of 16, where they lost 3–0 to England. It marked the second time Senegal had progressed past the group stage, in only their third appearance.

On 10 June 2025, Senegal won 3–1 against England, becoming the first African country to defeat England in a football match at senior level.

On 18 January 2026, Senegal won their second African Cup of Nations after beating host nation Morocco 1–0 after extra time in the final. However, the match was marred by a walkout by Senegal's players in protest at the awarding of a stoppage-time penalty to Morocco. This led to the Confederation of African Football overturning the result on 17 March 2026, calling the walkout a forfeiture of the match by Senegal, and awarding the trophy to Morocco instead. The Senegalese Football Federation said it will appeal against this ruling.

On 26 June 2026, during their final group stage match of the 2026 FIFA World Cup, Senegal defeated Iraq 5–0, securing the largest victory by an African team in World Cup history and surpassing Algeria's 4–2 win over South Korea in 2014. Despite consecutive losses to France and Norway, this historic win allowed them to advance to the knockout rounds with just 3 points.

On 1 July 2026, during the round of 32 of the 2026 FIFA World Cup, they blew a 2–0 lead against Belgium in the 85th minute, ultimately being eliminated 3–2 after a late penalty by Belgian captain Youri Tielemans, right before the match would have gone to a penalty shoot-out.

== Kit history ==
Puma has been the manufacturer of Senegal's kits since 2005 (except 2017, when Romai was the manufacturer). The home kit is typically white, and the away kit is green.

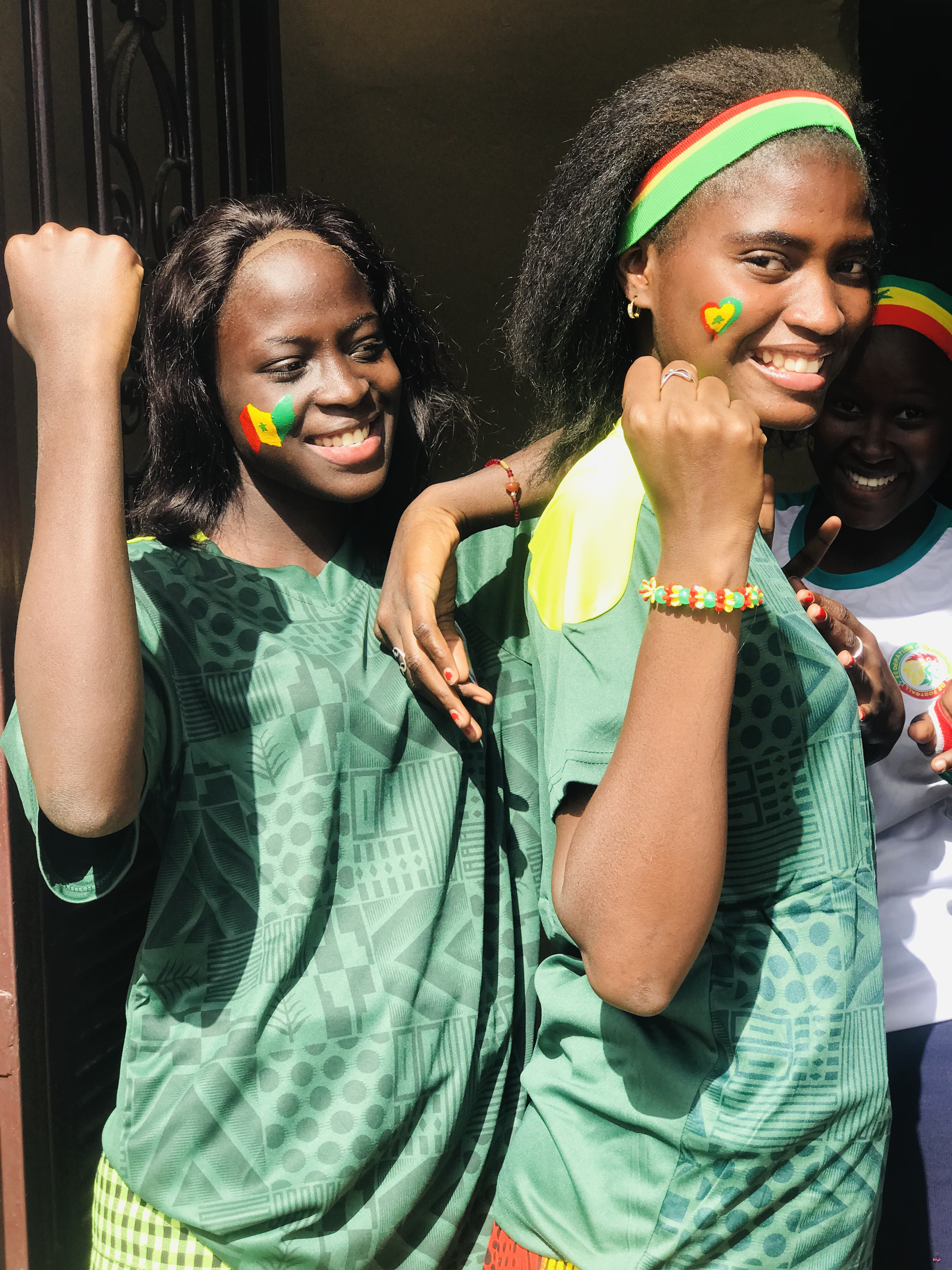
Supporters wearing the away kit

Kit providers	Period
None	1960–1980
(Germany) Adidas	1980–2000
(Italy) Erreà	2000–2001
(France) Le Coq Sportif	2002–2004
(Germany) Puma	2005–2016
(United Arab Emirates) Romai	2017
(Germany) Puma	2018–present

== Results and fixtures ==
The following is a list of match results in the last 12 months, as well as any future matches that have been scheduled.

Win Draw Loss Fixture

=== 2025 ===
23 December 2025 AFCON GS	Senegal	3–0	Botswana	Tangier, Morocco
16:00 UTC+1	Jackson 40', 58'; C. Ndiaye 90'	Report		Stadium: Ibn Batouta Stadium; Attendance: 18,591; Referee: Abdel Aziz Bouh (Mauritania)

27 December 2025 AFCON GS	Senegal	1–1	DR Congo	Tangier, Morocco
16:00 UTC+1	Mané 69'	Report	Bakambu 61'	Stadium: Ibn Batouta Stadium; Attendance: 41,672; Referee: Lahlou Benbraham (Algeria)

30 December 2025 AFCON GS	Benin	0–3	Senegal	Tangier, Morocco
20:00 UTC+1		Report	Seck 38'; H. Diallo 62'; Koulibaly (red card) 71'; C. Ndiaye 90+7'	Stadium: Ibn Batouta Stadium; Attendance: 26,707; Referee: Samuel Uwikunda (Rwanda)

=== 2026 ===
3 January 2025 AFCON R16	Senegal	3–1	Sudan	Tangier, Morocco
17:00 UTC+1	P. Gueye 29', 45+3'; Mbaye 77'	Report	Aamir Abdallah 6'	Stadium: Tangier Grand Stadium; Attendance: 30,045; Referee: Dahane Beida (Mauritania)

9 January 2025 AFCON QF	Mali	0–1	Senegal	Tangier, Morocco
17:00 UTC+1	Bissouma (yellow card) 23' (yellow-red card) 45+3'	Report	I. Ndiaye 27'	Stadium: Tangier Grand Stadium; Attendance: 32,385; Referee: Abongile Tom (South Africa)

14 January 2025 AFCON SF	Senegal	1–0	Egypt	Tangier, Morocco
18:00 UTC+1	Mané 78'	Report		Stadium: Tangier Grand Stadium; Attendance: 52,079; Referee: Pierre Atcho (Gabon)

18 January 2025 AFCON Final	Senegal	0–3; Awarded (Note: The final match originally finished 1–0 for Senegal after extra time. On 17 March 2026, the CAF Appeal Board ruled that Senegal had forfeited the match for temporarily refusing to play and leaving the pitch in protest of a refereeing decision. Pursuant to articles 82 and 84 of the competition regulations, the final was awarded as a 3–0 win for Morocco, thereby retroactively declaring them as 2025 Africa Cup of Nations champions and stripping Senegal of the title. The following day, the Senegalese Football Federation announced it would appeal the decision to the Court of Arbitration for Sport.)	Morocco	Rabat, Morocco
20:00 UTC+1	P. Gueye 94'	Report		Stadium: Prince Moulay Abdellah Stadium; Attendance: 66,526; Referee: Jean-Jacques Ndala (DR Congo)

28 March Friendly	Senegal	2–0	Peru	Paris, France
17:00 UTC+1	Jackson 41'; I. Sarr 54'	Report		Stadium: Stade de France; Attendance: 70,000; Referee: Jeremie Pignard (France)

31 March Friendly	Senegal	3–1	Gambia	Dakar, Senegal
19:00 UTC+0	Seck 45+4'; Mbaye 47'; Camara 90+5'	Report	Colley 51'	Stadium: Diamniadio Olympic Stadium; Referee: Abdelaziz Bouh (Mauritania)

31 May Friendly	United States	3–2	Senegal	Charlotte, North Carolina, United States
15:30 UTC−5	Dest 7'; Pulisic 20'; Balogun 63'	Report	Mané 44', 52'	Stadium: Bank of America Stadium; Attendance: 57,741; Referee: Nick Walsh (Scotland)

9 June Friendly	Saudi Arabia	0–0	Senegal	San Antonio, Texas, United States
		Report		Stadium: Toyota Field; Referee: Victor Rivas (United States)

16 June 2026 World Cup Group I	France	3–1	Senegal	East Rutherford, New Jersey, United States
15:00 UTC−4	Mbappé 66', 90+6'; Barcola 82'	Report	Mbaye 90+5'	Stadium: MetLife Stadium; Attendance: 80,545; Referee: Alireza Faghani (Australia)

22 June 2026 World Cup Group I	Norway	3–2	Senegal	East Rutherford, New Jersey, United States
20:00 UTC−4	Holmgren Pedersen 43'; Haaland 48', 58'	Report	I. Sarr 53', 90+3'	Stadium: MetLife Stadium; Attendance: 80,663; Referee: Wilton Sampaio (Brazil)

26 June 2026 World Cup Group I	Senegal	5–0	Iraq	Toronto, Ontario, Canada
15:00 UTC−4	Diarra 4'; I. Sarr 56'; P. Gueye 59', 71'; I. Ndiaye 82'	Report		Stadium: BMO Field; Attendance: 43,036; Referee: Anthony Taylor (England)

1 July 2026 FIFA World Cup Round of 32	Belgium	3–2 (a.e.t.)	Senegal	Seattle, United States
13:00 UTC−7	Lukaku 86'; Tielemans 89', 120+5' (pen.)	Report	Diarra 24'; I. Sarr 51'	Stadium: Lumen Field; Attendance: 66,925; Referee: Saíd Martínez (Honduras)

25 September 2027 AFCON qualification	Mozambique	1–1	Senegal	Maputo, Mozambique
15:00 UTC+0	Catamo 45+2'	Report	Jackson 32'	Stadium: Zimpeto Stadium; Referee: Mutaz Ibrahim (Libya)

29 September 2027 AFCON qualification	Ethiopia	0–1	Senegal	Bahir Dar, Ethiopia
15:00 UTC+0		Report	Mbaye 11'	Stadium: Bahir Dar Stadium; Referee: Willy Stéphane Ngah (Cameroon)

4 October Friendly	Senegal	1–0	Comoros	Marseille, France
15:00 UTC+2	I. Ndiaye 5'	Report		Stadium: Stade Vélodrome; Referee: Lawrence Visser (Belgium)

12 November 2027 AFCON qualification	Senegal	4–1	Sudan	Dakar, Senegal
19:00 UTC+0	Jackson 31'; Dia 61'; Mbaye 64'; Mboup 86'	Report	Abdalla 45'	Stadium: Léopold Sédar Senghor Stadium; Referee: Abongile Tom (South Africa)

16 November 2027 AFCON qualification	Sudan	2–4	Senegal	Juba, South Sudan
15:00 UTC+2	Nouh 52'; Adel 75'	Report	Jackson 4'; M. Diouf 22'; Mboup 87'; Mendy 90+1'	Stadium: Juba National Stadium; Referee: Hillary Hambaba (Zambia)

=== 2027 ===
24 March 2027 AFCON qualification	Senegal	v	Mozambique	TBD, Senegal
TBD				Stadium: TBD

28 March 2027 AFCON qualification	Senegal	v	Ethiopia	TBD, Senegal
TBD				Stadium: TBD

== Coaching staff ==
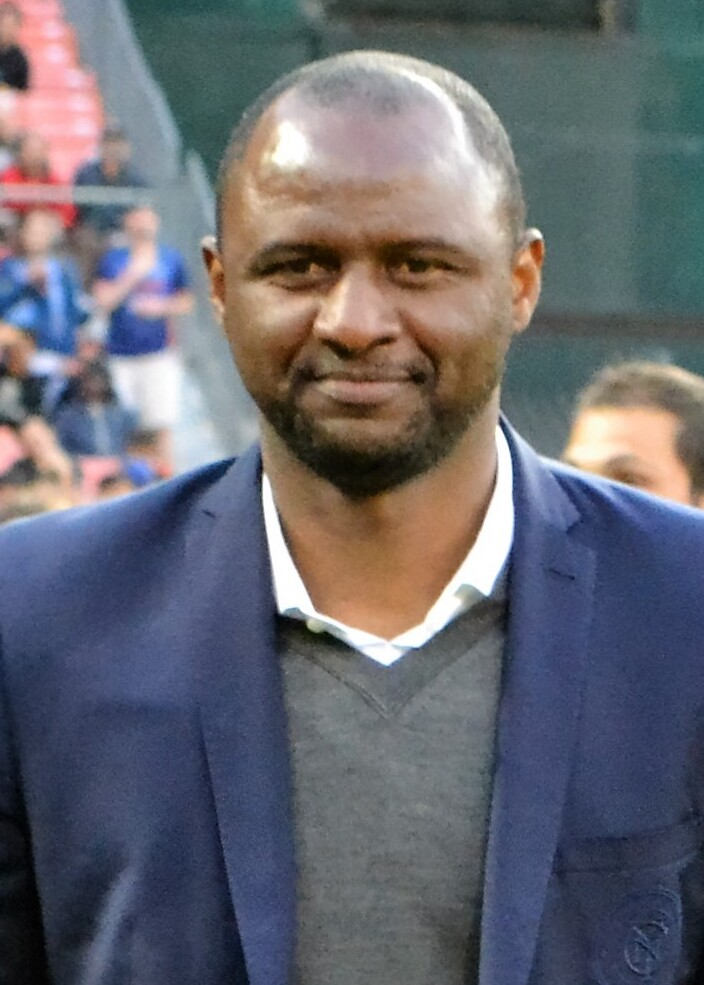
Current head coach Patrick Vieira

Position	Name
Head Coach	(France) Patrick Vieira
Assistant Coach	(Senegal) Pape Ibrahim Ndiaye
Assistant Coach II	(Senegal) Alsény Thiam
Goalkeeping Coach	(Senegal) Boubacarr Mbodj
Team Coordinator	(Senegal) Mbaye Seck
Physical Trainer	(Senegal) Ousmane Thioub
Media Officer	(Senegal) Djibril Sarr
Technical Director	(Senegal) Karim Ndour
Team Doctor	(Senegal) Ismaïl Kébé

=== Coaching history ===
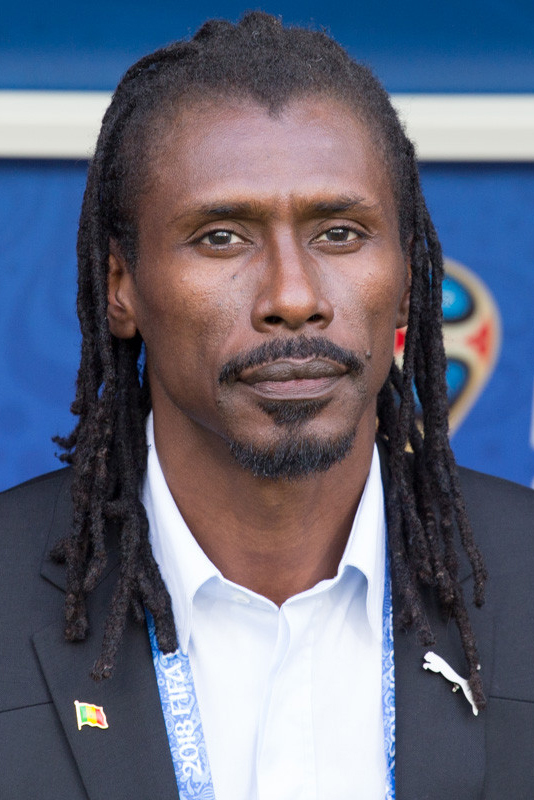
Aliou Cissé, the former coach of the national team from 2015 to 2024, is considered the most successful coach in the team's history, leading the team to win the 2021 Africa Cup of Nations and to participate in the 2018 and 2022 World Cups. He was the captain of the team that reached the quarter-finals of the 2002 FIFA World Cup.

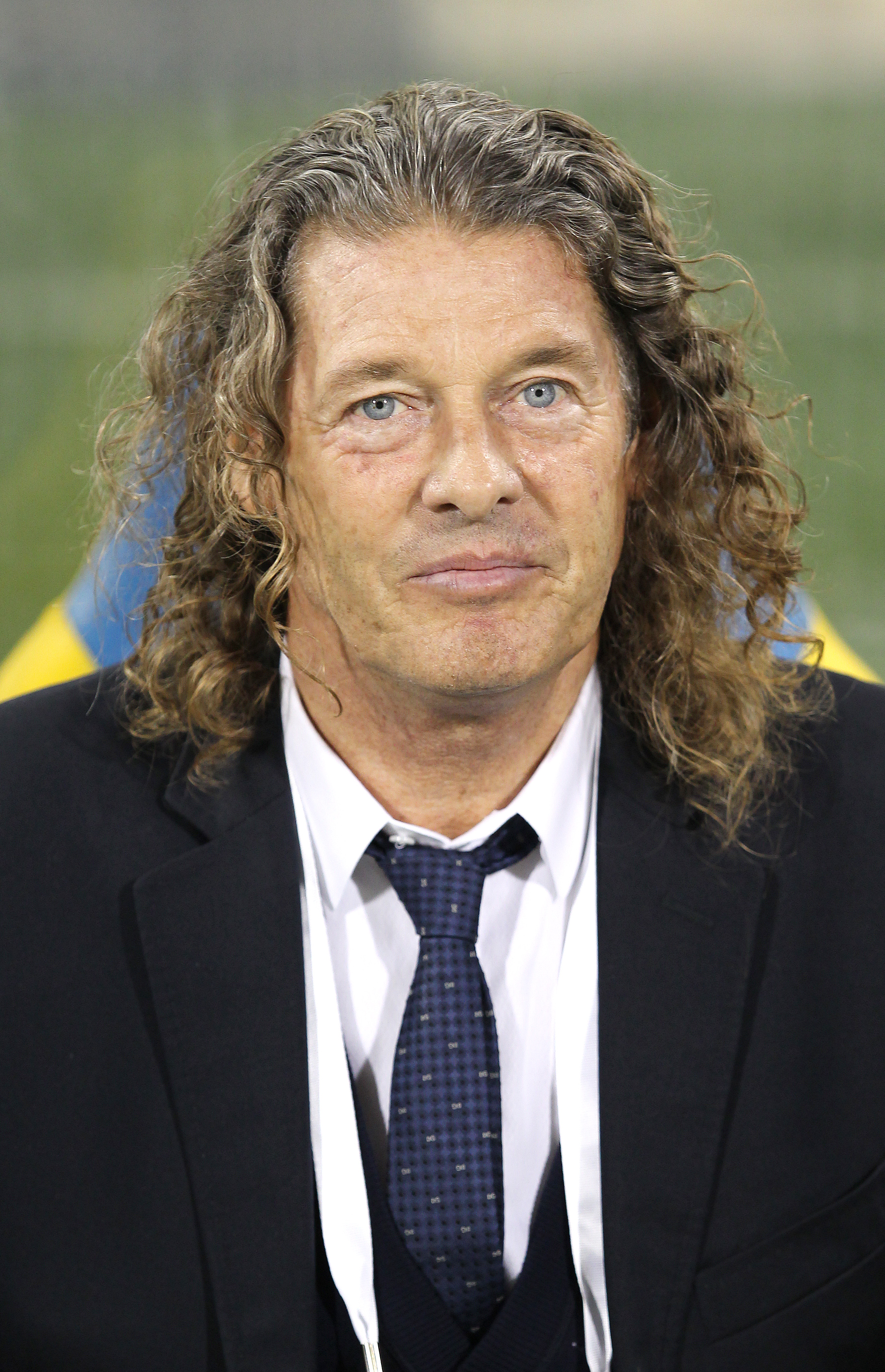
Bruno Metsu, coach of the national team between 2000 and 2002, led the team to the final of the 2002 African Nations Cup and to participate for the first time in the FIFA World Cup in 2002, where it reached the quarter-finals.

Manager	Period	Honours
(France) Raoul Diagne	1960–1961	
(France) Jules Vandooren	1961–1963	
(Senegal) Habib Bâ (Senegal) Lybasse Diop	1963–1965	1965 Africa Cup of Nations – Fourth place
(Senegal) Lamine Diack	1965–1968	1968 Africa Cup of Nations – Group stage
(West Germany) Otto Pfister	1979–1982	
(Senegal) Pape Alioune Diop	1982–1986	1986 Africa Cup of Nations – Group stage 1986 FIFA World Cup – Failed to qualify
(Senegal) Mawade Wade	1986–1989	1988 Africa Cup of Nations – Failed to qualify 1990 FIFA World Cup – Failed to qualify
(France) Claude Le Roy	1989–1992	1990 Africa Cup of Nations – Fourth place 1992 Africa Cup of Nations – Quarter-finals
(Senegal) Lamine Dieng	1992–1993	
(Senegal) Boubacar Sarr	1993–1994	1994 FIFA World Cup – Failed to qualify
(Senegal) Jules Bocandé (Senegal) Boubacar Sarr	1994–1995	1994 Africa Cup of Nations – Quarter-finals; 1996 Africa Cup of Nations – Failed to qualify
(Germany) Peter Schnittger	1995–2000	1998 Africa Cup of Nations – Failed to qualify 1998 FIFA World Cup – Failed to qualify 2000 Africa Cup of Nations – Quarter-finals
(France) Bruno Metsu	2000–2002	2002 African Cup of Nations – Runners-up; 2002 FIFA World Cup – Quarter-finals
(France) Guy Stéphan	2002–2005	2004 Africa Cup of Nations – Quarter-finals; 2006 FIFA World Cup – Failed to qualify
(Senegal) Abdoulaye Sarr	2005–2006	2006 Africa Cup of Nations – Fourth place
(Poland) Henryk Kasperczak	2006–2008	2008 Africa Cup of Nations – Group stage
(Senegal) Lamine N'Diaye	2008	
(Senegal) Amsatou Fall (caretaker)	2009	2010 Africa Cup of Nations – Failed to qualify 2010 FIFA World Cup – Failed to qualify
(Senegal) Amara Traoré	2009–2012	2012 Africa Cup of Nations – Group stage
(Senegal) Karim Séga Diouf (Senegal) Aliou Cissé (caretaker)	2012	
(Senegal) Joseph Koto (caretaker)	2012	2013 Africa Cup of Nations – Failed to qualify
(Senegal) Mayacine Mar (caretaker)	2012–2013	2014 FIFA World Cup – Failed to qualify
(France) Alain Giresse	2013–2015	2015 Africa Cup of Nations – Group stage
(Senegal) Aliou Cissé	2015–2024	2017 Africa Cup of Nations – Quarter-finals; 2018 FIFA World Cup – Group stage 2019 Africa Cup of Nations – Runners-up; 2021 Africa Cup of Nations – Champions; 2022 FIFA World Cup – Round of 16; 2023 Africa Cup of Nations – Round of 16
(Senegal) Pape Thiaw	2024–2026	2025 Africa Cup of Nations - Runners-up; 2026 FIFA World Cup - Round of 32
(France) Patrick Vieira	2026–present	

== Players ==
=== Current squad ===
The following players were called up for the 2027 Africa Cup of Nations qualification matches against Sudan on 12 and 16 November 2026 respectively.
Caps and goals updated as of 16 November 2026, after the match against Sudan.

No.	Pos.	Player	Date of birth (age)	Caps	Goals	Club
1	GK	Yehvann Diouf	16 November 1999 (age 27)	6	0	(French Football Federation) Nice
16	GK	Mamour Ndiaye	22 October 2005 (age 21)	0	0	(French Football Federation) Saint-Étienne
23	GK	Mory Diaw	22 June 1993 (age 33)	10	0	(Saudi Arabian Football Federation) Al-Shabab
3	DF	Kalidou Koulibaly	20 June 1991 (age 35)	108	2	(Saudi Arabian Football Federation) Al-Hilal
4	DF	Sadibou Sané	10 June 2004 (age 22)	4	0	(French Football Federation) Monaco (Note: Monaco is a Monégasque club playing in the French football league system.)
15	DF	Arouna Sangante	12 April 2002 (age 24)	0	0	(Royal Spanish Football Federation) Sevilla
19	DF	Moussa Niakhaté	8 March 1996 (age 30)	40	0	(French Football Federation) Lyon
25	DF	El Hadji Malick Diouf	28 December 2004 (age 21)	27	2	(The Football Association) Brentford
27	DF	Malang Sarr	23 January 1999 (age 27)	3	0	(Saudi Arabian Football Federation) Neom
29	DF	Massiré Sylla	7 January 2005 (age 21)	1	0	(Royal Belgian Football Association) Union SG
8	MF	Lamine Camara	1 January 2004 (age 22)	52	7	(French Football Federation) Monaco
17	MF	Pape Matar Sarr	14 September 2002 (age 24)	46	4	(Italian Football Federation) Juventus
21	MF	Dion Lopy	2 February 2002 (age 24)	7	0	(Saudi Arabian Football Federation) Al-Ittihad
24	MF	Pape Demba Diop	4 September 2003 (age 23)	3	0	(French Football Federation) Strasbourg
26	MF	Pape Gueye	24 January 1999 (age 27)	50	7	(Royal Spanish Football Federation) Villarreal
7	FW	Pathé Mboup	19 October 2003 (age 23)	2	2	(French Football Federation) Brest
9	FW	Boulaye Dia	16 November 1996 (age 30)	41	8	(French Football Federation) Rennes
10	FW	Iliman Ndiaye	6 March 2000 (age 26)	47	6	(The Football Association) Manchester City
11	FW	Nicolas Jackson	20 June 2001 (age 25)	42	11	(The Football Association) Aston Villa
12	FW	Issa Soumaré	10 October 2000 (age 26)	2	0	(French Football Federation) Rennes
14	FW	Paul Mendy	13 January 2007 (age 19)	2	1	(Italian Football Federation) Cagliari
20	FW	Ibrahim Mbaye	24 January 2008 (age 18)	20	6	(The Football Association) Aston Villa
22	FW	Clayton Diandy	29 July 2006 (age 20)	1	0	(Saudi Arabian Football Federation) Al-Diriyah

=== Recent call-ups ===
The following players have also been called up for Senegal in the last twelve months.

Pos.	Player	Date of birth (age)	Caps	Goals	Club	Latest call-up
GK	Demba Thiam	9 March 1998 (age 28)	0	0	(Italy) Monza	v. Comoros, 4 October 2026
GK	Édouard Mendy ^{RET}	1 March 1992 (age 34)	60	0	(Saudi Arabia) Al-Ahli	2026 FIFA World Cup
DF	Lamine Sy	10 August 2002 (age 24)	3	0	(France) Auxerre	v. Sudan, 16 November 2026 ^{WD}
DF	Nobel Mendy	3 September 2004 (age 22)	2	0	(England) Hull City	v. Sudan, 16 November 2026 ^{WD}
DF	Krépin Diatta	25 February 1999 (age 27)	66	2	(England) Watford	v. Sudan, 12 November 2026 ^{WD}
DF	Mamadou Sarr	29 August 2005 (age 21)	9	0	(Spain) Real Sociedad	v. Sudan, 12 November 2026 ^{WD}
DF	Ismail Jakobs ^{RET}	17 August 1999 (age 27)	34	0	(Turkey) Galatasaray	2026 FIFA World Cup
DF	Abdoulaye Seck	4 June 1992 (age 34)	26	4	(Saudi Arabia) Al-Faisaly	2026 FIFA World Cup
DF	Antoine Mendy	27 May 2004 (age 22)	7	0	(France) Nice	2026 FIFA World Cup
DF	Ilay Camara	18 January 2003 (age 23)	3	0	(Belgium) Anderlecht	2026 FIFA World Cup ^{PRE}
DF	Moustapha Mbow	8 March 2000 (age 26)	1	0	(France) Paris FC	2026 FIFA World Cup ^{PRE}
MF	Idrissa Gueye	26 September 1989 (age 37)	143	7	(Saudi Arabia) Al-Diriyah	v. Comoros, 4 October 2026
MF	Bara Sapoko Ndiaye	31 December 2007 (age 18)	4	0	(Germany) Bayern Munich	v. Comoros, 4 October 2026
MF	Rassoul Ndiaye	11 December 2001 (age 24)	3	0	(France) Le Havre	v. Comoros, 4 October 2026
MF	Pathé Ciss	16 March 1994 (age 32)	35	0	(Spain) Rayo Vallecano	2026 FIFA World Cup
MF	Habib Diarra	3 January 2004 (age 22)	24	6	(England) Sunderland	2026 FIFA World Cup
MF	Mamadou Camara	5 January 2003 (age 23)	3	1	(Libya) Al-Ahli Tripoli	2025 Africa Cup of Nations
MF	Ousseynou Niang	12 October 2001 (age 25)	3	1	(Belgium) Zulte Waregem	2025 Africa Cup of Nations
FW	Assane Diao	7 December 2005 (age 20)	9	0	(Italy) Como	v. Comoros, 4 October 2026
FW	Pape Moussa Fall	4 July 2004 (age 22)	3	0	(France) Metz	v. Comoros, 4 October 2026
FW	Mamadou Diakhon	22 September 2005 (age 21)	2	0	(Belgium) Club Brugge	v. Comoros, 4 October 2026
FW	Abdallah Sima	17 June 2001 (age 25)	12	0	(France) Lens	v. Comoros, 4 October 2026 ^{INJ}
FW	Ismaïla Sarr	25 February 1998 (age 28)	88	23	(England) Crystal Palace	v. Mozambique, 25 September 2026 ^{INJ}
FW	Sadio Mané	10 April 1992 (age 34)	134	56	(Saudi Arabia) Al-Nassr	2026 FIFA World Cup
FW	Bamba Dieng	23 March 2000 (age 26)	24	2	(Serbia) Red Star Belgrade	2026 FIFA World Cup
FW	Cherif Ndiaye	23 January 1996 (age 30)	19	4	(Greece) PAOK	2026 FIFA World Cup
FW	Habib Diallo	18 June 1995 (age 31)	41	9	(France) Le Mans	v. Gambia, 31 March 2026
FW	Cheikh Sabaly	4 March 1999 (age 27)	12	1	(Canada) Vancouver Whitecaps	2025 Africa Cup of Nations
FW	Ousmane Sow	5 July 2000 (age 26)	0	0	(Poland) Jagiellonia Białystok	2025 Africa Cup of Nations ^{PRE}
^{DEC} Player refused to join the team after the call-up.^{INJ} Player withdrew from the squad due to an injury.^{PRE} Preliminary squad.^{RET} Player has retired from international football.^{SUS} Suspended from the national team.^{WD} Player withdrew from the squad due to non-injury issue.

== Player records ==
As of 16 November 2026
Players in bold are still active with Senegal.

=== Most appearances ===
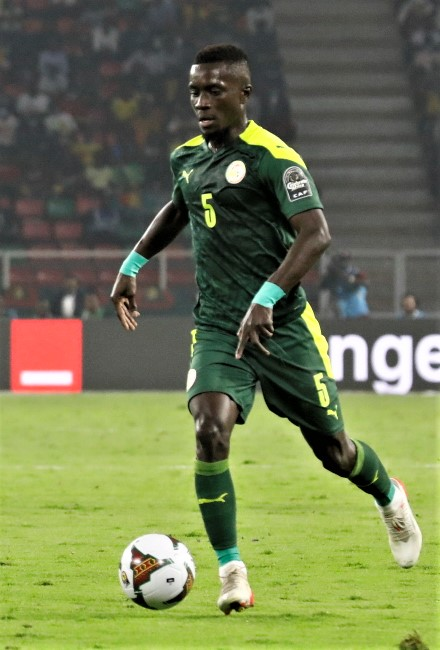
Idrissa Gueye is Senegal's most capped player with 143 appearances.

Rank	Player	Caps	Goals	Career
1	**Idrissa Gueye**	143	7	2011–present
2	**Sadio Mané**	134	56	2012–present
3	**Kalidou Koulibaly**	108	2	2015–present
4	Henri Camara	99	29	1999–2008
5	Cheikhou Kouyaté	92	4	2012–2024
6	**Ismaïla Sarr**	88	23	2016–present
7	Roger Mendy	87	3	1979–1995
8	Tony Sylva	83	0	1999–2008
9	Jules Bocandé	73	20	1979–1993
10	Lamine Diatta	71	4	2000–2008

=== Top goalscorers ===
Sadio Mané is Senegal's all-time top scorer with 56 goals.

Rank	Player	Goals	Caps	Ratio	Career
1	**Sadio Mané** (list)	56	134	0.42	2012–present
2	Henri Camara	29	99	0.29	1999–2008
3	El Hadji Diouf	24	70	0.34	2000–2008
4	**Ismaïla Sarr**	23	88	0.26	2016–present
5	Mamadou Niang	20	58	0.34	2002–2012
5	Jules Bocandé	20	73	0.27	1979–1993
7	Moussa Sow	18	50	0.36	2009–2018
8	Papiss Cissé	17	36	0.47	2009–2015
9	Mamadou Diallo	16	35	0.46	1990–1999
10	Moussa Konaté	12	34	0.35	2012–2019

== Competitive record ==
=== FIFA World Cup ===
Senegal have appeared in the finals of the FIFA World Cup on four occasions, in 2002, where they reached the quarter-finals, 2018, 2022, and 2026.

FIFA World Cup record										FIFA World Cup qualification record					
Year	Round	Position	Pld	W	D*	L	GF	GA	Squad	Pld	W	D	L	GF	GA
(Uruguay) 1930	Part of France									Part of France					
(Italy) 1934	Part of France									Part of France					
(France) 1938	Part of France									Part of France					
(Brazil) 1950	Part of France									Part of France					
(Switzerland) 1954	Part of France									Part of France					
(Chile) 1962	Not a FIFA member									Not a FIFA member					
(England) 1966	Withdrew									Withdrew					
(Mexico) 1970	Did not qualify									3	1	0	2	2	4
(West Germany) 1974	Did not qualify									2	0	1	1	1	2
(Argentina) 1978	Did not qualify									2	0	1	1	1	2
(Spain) 1982	Did not qualify									2	0	1	1	0	1
(Mexico) 1986	Did not qualify									2	1	0	1	1	1
(Italy) 1990	Did not enter									Declined participation					
(United States) 1994	Did not qualify									8	3	1	4	11	12
(France) 1998	Did not qualify									2	0	1	1	2	3
(South Korea) (Japan) 2002	Quarter-finals	7th	5	2	2	1	7	6	Squad	10	5	4	1	16	3
(Germany) 2006	Did not qualify									10	6	3	1	21	8
(South Africa) 2010	Did not qualify									6	2	3	1	9	7
(Brazil) 2014	Did not qualify									8	3	4	1	11	8
(Russia) 2018	Group stage	17th	3	1	1	1	4	4	Squad	8	5	3	0	15	5
(Qatar) 2022	Round of 16	10th	4	2	0	2	5	7	Squad	8	6	1	1	16	5
(Canada) (Mexico) (United States) 2026	Round of 32	31st	4	1	0	3	10	9	Squad	10	7	3	0	22	3
(Morocco) (Portugal) (Spain) 2030	To be determined									To be determined					
(Saudi Arabia) 2034	To be determined									To be determined					
Total	Quarter-finals	4/15	16	6	3	7	26	26	—	81	39	26	16	128	64

=== Africa Cup of Nations ===
Historically, Senegal was seen as a weaker side in the strong West African region. Although they finished in fourth place in two AFCON editions, Senegalese performance was overall still deemed as poor. Senegal remained under the shadow of West African giants Nigeria, Ivory Coast and Ghana for the majority of the 20th century.

In the 2000s, Senegal began to surge and became a more competitive opponent in the Africa Cup of Nations. Following the 2002 Africa Cup of Nations tournament, where Senegal suffered a defeat to Cameroon 2–3 on penalties after a goalless draw in the final, they would establish themselves as a new powerhouse in Africa by having a successful FIFA World Cup debut in 2002, in which the side reached the quarter-finals. Senegal once again finished as runners-up in 2019, losing the final 0–1 to Algeria, and finally won their first AFCON title in 2021.

Africa Cup of Nations record										Africa Cup of Nations qualification record					
Year	Round	Position	Pld	W	D*	L	GF	GA	Squad	Pld	W	D	L	GF	GA
(Sudan) 1957	Part of France									Part of France					
(United Arab Republic) 1959	Part of France									Part of France					
(Ethiopia) 1962	Not affiliated to CAF									Not affiliated to CAF					
(Ghana) 1963	Not affiliated to CAF									Not affiliated to CAF					
(Tunisia) 1965	Fourth place	4th	3	1	1	1	5	2	Squad	4	3	0	1	8	4
(Ethiopia) 1968	Group stage	5th	3	1	1	1	5	5	Squad	4	2	1	1	9	4
(Sudan) 1970	Did not qualify									2	0	1	1	5	4
(Cameroon) 1972	Did not qualify									2	0	1	1	1	0
(Egypt) 1974	Did not qualify									2	0	1	1	3	3
(Ethiopia) 1976	Did not qualify									2	0	1	1	5	2
(Ghana) 1978	Did not qualify									4	2	0	2	6	4
(Nigeria) 1980	Did not enter									Did not enter					
(Libya) 1982	Did not qualify									4	1	0	2	4	2
(Ivory Coast) 1984	Did not qualify									4	2	1	0	3	2
(Egypt) 1986	Group stage	5th	3	2	0	1	3	1	Squad	4	4	0	0	5	2
(Morocco) 1988	Did not qualify									4	1	3	0	4	0
(Algeria) 1990	Fourth place	4th	5	1	2	2	3	3	Squad	2	1	1	0	4	1
(Senegal) 1992	Quarter-finals	5th	3	1	0	2	4	3	Squad	Qualified as hosts					
(Tunisia) 1994	Quarter-finals	8th	3	1	0	2	2	3	Squad	6	2	1	3	8	9
(South Africa) 1996	Did not qualify									8	3	3	2	10	8
(Burkina Faso) 1998	Did not qualify									6	2	2	2	5	6
(Ghana) (Nigeria) 2000	Quarter-finals	7th	4	1	1	2	6	6	Squad	4	1	2	1	4	4
(Mali) 2002	Runners-up	2nd	6	4	2	0	6	1	Squad	4	1	2	1	4	2
(Tunisia) 2004	Quarter-finals	6th	4	1	2	1	4	2	Squad	6	3	0	1	7	1
(Egypt) 2006	Fourth place	4th	6	2	0	4	7	8	Squad	10	6	3	1	21	8
(Ghana) 2008	Group stage	12th	3	0	2	1	4	6	Squad	6	3	2	1	12	3
(Angola) 2010	Did not qualify									6	2	3	1	9	7
(Gabon) (Equatorial Guinea) 2012	Group stage	13th	3	0	0	3	3	6	Squad	6	5	1	0	16	2
(South Africa) 2013	Did not qualify									2	0	0	2	2	6
(Equatorial Guinea) 2015	Group stage	9th	3	1	1	1	3	4	Squad	6	4	1	1	8	1
(Gabon) 2017	Quarter-finals	5th	4	2	2	0	6	2	Squad	6	6	0	0	13	2
(Egypt) 2019	Runners-up	2nd	7	5	0	2	8	2	Squad	6	5	1	0	12	2
(Cameroon) 2021	Champions	1st	7	4	3	0	9	2	Squad	6	4	2	0	10	2
(Ivory Coast) 2023	Round of 16	9th	4	3	1	0	9	2	Squad	6	4	2	0	12	4
(Morocco) 2025	Runners-up	2nd	7	5	1	1	12	5	Squad	6	5	1	0	10	1
(Kenya) (Tanzania) (Uganda) 2027	Qualified									4	3	1	0	10	4
2028	To be determined									To be determined					
Total	1 Title	19/35	78	36	19	23	100	60	—	150	72	32	26	220	97

=== African Nations Championship ===
African Nations Championship record
Year	Round	Position	Pld	W	D*	L	GF	GA	Squad
(Ivory Coast) 2009	Fourth place	4th	5	1	3	1	3	3	Squad
(Sudan) 2011	Group stage	10th	3	1	1	1	2	2	Squad
(South Africa) 2014	Did not qualify								
(Rwanda) 2016	Did not qualify								
(Morocco) 2018	Did not qualify								
(Cameroon) 2020	Did not qualify								
(Algeria) 2022	Champions	1st	6	4	1	1	6	1	Squad
(Kenya) (Tanzania) (Uganda) 2024	Third place	3rd	6	2	4	0	5	3	
Total	Champions	3/7	14	6	5	3	11	6	—

=== Amílcar Cabral Cup ===
Amílcar Cabral Cup record
Year	Round	Position	Pld	W	D*	L	GF	GA
(Guinea-Bissau) 1979	Champions	1st	4	4	0	0	7	1
(The Gambia) 1980	Champions	1st	4	3	0	1	5	3
(Mali) 1981	Third place	3rd	4	3	0	1	7	2
(Cape Verde) 1982	Runners-up	2nd	5	3	1	1	5	1
(Mauritania) 1983	Champions	1st	5	3	2	0	9	4
(Sierra Leone) 1984	Champions	1st	5	3	1	1	10	3
(The Gambia) 1985	Champions	1st	5	4	1	0	8	2
(Senegal) 1986	Champions	1st	4	4	0	0	7	2
(Guinea) 1987	Third place	3rd	4	1	1	2	2	2
(Guinea-Bissau) 1988	Third place	3rd	5	2	3	0	10	5
(Mali) 1989	Group stage	6th	3	0	2	1	3	4
(Senegal) 1991	Champions	1st	4	3	1	0	7	0
(Sierra Leone) 1993	Runners-up	2nd	5	2	1	2	6	3
(Mauritania) 1995	Group stage	5th	3	1	1	1	5	3
(The Gambia) 1997	Runners-up	2nd	5	2	2	1	5	3
(Cape Verde) 2000	Runners-up	2nd	5	1	3	1	8	6
(Mali) 2001	Champions	1st	4	3	1	0	11	3
(Guinea) 2005	Runners-up	2nd	4	1	2	1	3	3
(Guinea-Bissau) 2007	Third place	3rd	4	2	1	1	5	4
Total	8 Titles	19/19	82	45	25	14	123	54

=== WAFU Nations Cup ===
WAFU Nations Cup record
Year	Round	Position	Pld	W	D*	L	GF	GA
(Nigeria) 2010	Runners-up	2nd	5	2	1	2	4	4
(Nigeria) 2011	Withdrew							
(Ghana) 2013	Runners-up	2nd	4	3	0	1	8	4
(Ghana) 2017	Group stage	5th	4	1	2	1	5	2
(Senegal) 2019	Champions	1st	4	3	1	0	7	2
(Nigeria) 2021	To be determined							
Total	1 Title	4/5	17	9	4	4	24	12

=== Other records ===
Year	Round	Position	Pld	W	D*	L	GF	GA
(Senegal) 1963 Friendship Games	Champions	1st	4	3	1	0	12	3
(Niger) Jeux de la Francophonie 2005	Runners-up	2nd	6	5	0	1	11	3
(Republic of the Congo) 2015 African Games	Champions	1st	4	2	2	0	5	2
(South Africa) 2021 COSAFA Cup	Runners-up	2nd	6	3	2	1	8	6
(South Africa) 2022 COSAFA Cup	Third place	3rd	3	1	2	0	6	5
Total	2 Titles	1st	23	14	7	2	42	19

== Head-to-head record ==
The list shown below shows the Senegal national football team all−time international record against opposing nations.

As of 4 October 2026 after match against Comoros.

Key

Positive balance (more wins than losses)
Neutral balance (as many wins as losses)
Negative balance (more losses than wins)

Against	Pld	W	D	L	GF	GA	GD	Winning %	Confederation
Algeria	24	4	6	14	18	33	−15	16.67	CAF
Angola	7	2	3	2	7	7	+0	28.57	CAF
Belgium	1	0	0	1	2	3	−1	0.00	UEFA
Benin	10	8	1	1	18	8	+10	80.00	CAF
Bolivia	2	2	0	0	4	1	+3	100.00	CONMEBOL
Bosnia and Herzegovina	1	0	1	0	0	0	+0	0.00	UEFA
Botswana	3	3	0	0	8	0	+8	100.00	CAF
Brazil	3	1	1	1	5	5	+0	33.33	CONMEBOL
Burkina Faso	15	5	8	2	23	16	+7	33.33	CAF
Burundi	6	5	0	1	9	2	+7	83.33	CAF
Cameroon	15	7	3	5	15	10	+5	46.67	CAF
Cape Verde	19	15	2	2	29	7	+22	78.95	CAF
Central African Republic	1	1	0	0	3	0	+3	100.00	CAF
Chile	1	0	0	1	1	2	−1	0.00	CONMEBOL
Chinese Taipei	1	1	0	0	6	0	+6	100.00	AFC
Colombia	2	0	1	1	2	3	−1	0.00	CONMEBOL
Comoros	1	1	0	0	1	0	+1	100.00	CAF
Congo	12	6	4	2	14	6	+8	50.00	CAF
Croatia	1	0	0	1	1	2	−1	0.00	UEFA
Denmark	3	0	1	2	3	6	−3	0.00	UEFA
DR Congo	10	5	3	2	16	13	+3	50.00	CAF
Ecuador	2	2	0	0	3	1	+2	100.00	CONMEBOL
Egypt	16	6	3	7	8	9	−1	37.50	CAF
England	2	1	0	1	3	4	-1	50.00	UEFA
Equatorial Guinea	4	3	0	1	8	1	+7	75.00	CAF
Eritrea	2	2	0	0	8	2	+6	100.00	CAF
Eswatini	3	1	2	0	7	4	+3	33.33	CAF
Ethiopia	4	4	0	0	12	2	+10	100.00	CAF
France	2	1	0	1	2	3	−1	50.00	UEFA
Gabon	7	5	1	1	10	4	+6	71.43	CAF
Gambia	25	15	10	0	36	8	+28	60.00	CAF
Ghana	13	4	5	4	16	17	−1	30.77	CAF
Greece	1	1	0	0	2	0	+2	100.00	UEFA
Guinea	56	26	14	16	70	60	+10	46.43	CAF
Guinea-Bissau	16	11	4	1	31	7	+24	68.75	CAF
Hungary	1	0	0	1	0	3	−3	0.00	UEFA
Indonesia	1	0	1	0	2	2	+0	0.00	AFC
Iran	2	0	2	0	2	2	+0	0.00	AFC
Iraq	1	1	0	0	5	0	+5	100.00	AFC
Republic of Ireland	1	0	1	0	1	1	+0	0.00	UEFA
Ivory Coast	24	7	4	13	24	29	−5	29.17	CAF
Japan	4	2	2	0	7	4	+3	50.00	AFC
Kenya	5	4	1	0	17	0	+17	80.00	CAF
Kosovo	1	1	0	0	3	1	+2	100.00	UEFA
Lebanon	1	0	0	1	2	3	−1	0.00	AFC
Lesotho	2	2	0	0	4	0	+4	100.00	CAF
Liberia	15	9	5	1	33	10	+23	60.00	CAF
Libya	6	2	1	3	6	7	−1	33.33	CAF
Luxembourg	1	0	1	0	0	0	+0	0.00	UEFA
Madagascar	4	2	2	0	9	4	+5	50.00	CAF
Malawi	6	4	1	1	10	5	+5	66.67	CAF
Malaysia	1	0	0	1	0	1	−1	0.00	AFC
Mali	33	13	12	8	42	33	+9	39.39	CAF
Mauritania	19	13	5	1	34	6	+28	68.42	CAF
Mauritius	2	2	0	0	9	0	+9	100.00	CAF
Mexico	2	0	0	2	0	3	−3	0.00	CONCACAF
Morocco	32	8	7	17	20	42	−22	25.00	CAF
Mozambique	7	4	3	0	10	3	+7	57.14	CAF
Namibia	8	7	0	1	24	5	+19	87.50	CAF
Netherlands	1	0	0	1	0	2	−2	0.00	UEFA
Niger	9	7	1	1	14	5	+9	77.78	CAF
Nigeria	20	6	6	8	21	21	+0	30.00	CAF
Norway	2	1	0	1	4	4	+0	50.00	UEFA
Oman	4	1	0	3	2	5	−3	25.00	AFC
Peru	2	1	0	1	2	1	+1	50.00	CONMEBOL
Poland	1	1	0	0	2	1	+1	100.00	UEFA
Qatar	1	1	0	0	3	1	+2	100.00	AFC
Réunion	1	0	0	1	0	2	−2	0.00	CAF
Rwanda	3	2	1	0	4	1	+3	66.67	CAF
Saudi Arabia	3	0	1	2	4	6	−2	0.00	AFC
Sierra Leone	22	10	6	6	27	21	+6	45.45	CAF
South Africa	10	4	5	1	12	8	+4	40.00	CAF
South Korea	4	2	1	1	4	3	+1	50.00	AFC
Sudan	8	5	3	0	11	2	+9	62.50	CAF
South Sudan	2	2	0	0	9	0	+9	100.00	CAF
Sweden	1	1	0	0	2	1	+1	100.00	UEFA
Tanzania	4	2	1	1	8	3	+5	50.00	CAF
Togo	27	8	10	9	27	25	+2	29.63	CAF
Tunisia	21	5	7	9	13	22	−9	23.81	CAF
Turkey	1	0	0	1	0	1	−1	0.00	UEFA
Uganda	8	4	3	1	9	4	+5	50.00	CAF
United Arab Emirates	4	1	2	1	8	7	+1	25.00	AFC
Uruguay	1	0	1	0	3	3	+0	0.00	CONMEBOL
United States	1	0	0	1	2	3	−1	0.00	CONCACAF
Uzbekistan	1	0	1	0	1	1	+0	0.00	AFC
Yemen	2	1	0	1	2	4	−2	50.00	AFC
Zambia	14	4	6	4	10	12	−2	28.57	CAF
Zimbabwe	10	6	0	4	13	8	+5	60.00	CAF
Total	674	326	174	174	848	561	+287	48.37	FIFA

== Honours ==
=== Continental ===
- Africa Cup of Nations
  - Champions (1): 2021
  - Runners-up (3): 2002, 2019, 2025
- African Nations Championship
  - Champions (1): 2022
  - Third place (1): 2024

=== Regional ===
- Amílcar Cabral Cup
  - (gold) Champions (7): 1979, 1980, 1983, 1984, 1985, 1986, 1991
  - (silver) Runners-up (4): 1982, 1993, 1997, 2000
  - (bronze) Third place (3): 1981, 1987, 1988
- WAFU Nations Cup
  - (gold) Champions (1): 2019
  - (silver) Runners-up (2): 2010, 2013
- CEDEAO Cup
  - (gold) Champions (1): 1985
  - (silver) Runners-up (2): 1990, 1991
  - (bronze) Third place (1): 1987
- UEMOA Tournament
  - (gold) Champions (3): 2009, 2011, 2016
- COSAFA Cup
  - (silver) Runners-up (1): 2021
  - (bronze) Third place (1): 2022

=== Awards ===
- FIFA Best Mover of the Year (1): 2002
- African National Team of the Year (4): 2001, 2002, 2007, 2022
- Africa Cup of Nations Fair Play Award (2): 2019, 2021

=== Summary ===
Competition	1st place, gold medalist(s)	2nd place, silver medalist(s)	3rd place, bronze medalist(s)	Total
Africa Cup of Nations	1	3	0	4
African Nations Championship	1	0	1	2
Total	2	3	1	6

== See also ==
- Senegal national under-20 football team
- Senegal national under-17 football team
- Football in Senegal

== Notes ==
Preceded by 2019 Algeria	African Champions; 2021 (First title)	Succeeded by 2023 Ivory Coast
