= 1986 Amílcar Cabral Cup =

Tournament details
- Host country: Senegal
- Dates: February 1–10
- Teams: 7
- Venue(s): (in 1 host city)

Final positions
- Champions: Senegal (6th title)
- Runners-up: Sierra Leone

Tournament statistics
- Matches played: 12
- Goals scored: 31 (2.58 per match)

The 1986 Amílcar Cabral Cup was held in Dakar, Senegal.

== Group stage ==
=== Group A ===
Team	Pts	Pld	W	D	L	GF	GA	GD
Senegal	4	2	2	0	0	3	1	+2
Guinea	1	2	0	1	1	2	3	–1
Mali	1	2	0	1	1	1	2	–1

Feb 1, 1986

Senegal	2 – 1	Guinea

Feb 3, 1986

Guinea	1 – 1	Mali

Feb 5, 1986

Senegal	1 – 0	Mali

=== Group B ===
Team	Pts	Pld	W	D	L	GF	GA	GD
Sierra Leone	6	3	3	0	0	6	3	+3
Gambia	4	3	2	0	1	7	3	+4
Guinea-Bissau	2	3	1	0	2	3	6	–3
Mauritania	0	3	0	0	3	1	5	–4

Feb 2, 1986

Gambia	3 – 0	Guinea-Bissau

Feb 2, 1986

Sierra Leone	1 – 0	Mauritania

Feb 4, 1986

Sierra Leone	2 – 1	Gambia

Feb 4, 1986

Guinea-Bissau	1 – 0	Mauritania

Feb 6, 1986

Gambia	3 – 1	Mauritania

Feb 6, 1986

Sierra Leone	3 – 2	Guinea-Bissau

== Knockout stage ==
=== Semi-finals ===
Feb 8, 1986

Sierra Leone	2 – 1	Guinea

Feb 8, 1986

Senegal	1 – 0	Gambia

=== Final ===
Feb 10, 1986

Senegal	3 – 1	Sierra Leone
