= 1983 Amílcar Cabral Cup =

Tournament details
- Host country: Mauritania
- Dates: July 20–29
- Teams: 8
- Venue: (in 1 host city)

Final positions
- Champions: Senegal (3rd title)
- Runners-up: Guinea-Bissau
- Third place: Mali

Tournament statistics
- Matches played: 16
- Goals scored: 41 (2.56 per match)

The 1983 Amílcar Cabral Cup was held in Nouakchott, Mauritania.

== Group stage ==
=== Group A ===
Pos	Team	Pts	Pld	W	D	L	GF	GA	GD
1	Mali	4	3	2	0	1	5	2	+3
2	Mauritania	4	3	2	0	1	3	2	+1
3	Sierra Leone	2	3	1	0	2	2	4	−2
4	Cape Verde	2	3	1	0	2	1	3	−2

July 20, 1983

Mauritania	2 – 0	Cape Verde

July 21, 1983

Mali	3 – 1	Sierra Leone

July 22, 1983

Cape Verde	1 – 0	Mali

July 23, 1983

Mauritania	1 – 0	Sierra Leone

July 24, 1983

Mali	2 – 0	Mauritania

July 25, 1983

Sierra Leone	1 – 0	Cape Verde

=== Group B ===
Pos	Team	Pts	Pld	W	D	L	GF	GA	GD
1	Guinea-Bissau	4	3	1	2	0	5	4	+1
2	Senegal	4	3	1	2	0	4	3	+1
3	Gambia	3	3	1	1	1	7	5	+2
4	Guinea	1	3	0	1	2	3	7	−4

July 20, 1983

Senegal	1 – 1	Guinea-Bissau

July 21, 1983

Gambia	4 – 1	Guinea

July 22, 1983

Guinea-Bissau	2 – 1	Guinea

July 23, 1983

Senegal	2 – 1	Gambia

July 24, 1983

Senegal	1 – 1	Guinea

July 25, 1983

Gambia	2 – 2	Guinea-Bissau

== Knockout stage ==
=== Semi-finals ===
July 27, 1983

Senegal	2 – 1	Mali

July 27, 1983

Guinea-Bissau	2 – 1	Mauritania

=== Third place match ===
July 28, 1983

Mali	2 – 0	Mauritania

=== Final ===
July 29, 1983

Senegal	3 – 0	Guinea-Bissau
