= 1979 Amílcar Cabral Cup =

Tournament details
- Host country: Guinea Bissau
- Dates: January 7–14
- Teams: 7
- Venue(s): (in 1 host city)

Final positions
- Champions: Senegal (1st title)
- Runners-up: Mali
- Third place: Guinea

Tournament statistics
- Matches played: 13
- Goals scored: 36 (2.77 per match)

The 1979 Amílcar Cabral Cup, the first edition of the tournament, was held in Bissau, Guinea Bissau.

== Group stage ==
=== Group A ===
Team	Pts	Pld	W	D	L	GF	GA	GD
Mali	6	3	3	0	0	6	2	+4
Guinea	3	3	1	1	1	5	3	+2
Gambia	3	3	1	1	1	4	3	+1
Mauritania	0	3	0	0	3	4	11	–7

Jan 8, 1979

Mali	1 – 0	Guinea

Jan 8, 1979

Gambia	3 – 1	Mauritania

Jan 10, 1979

Mali	1 – 0	Gambia

Jan 10, 1979

Guinea	4 – 1	Mauritania

Jan 12, 1979

Guinea	1 – 1	Gambia

Jan 12, 1979

Mali	4 – 2	Mauritania

=== Group B ===
Team	Pts	Pld	W	D	L	GF	GA	GD
Senegal	4	2	2	0	0	3	0	+3
Guinea-Bissau	2	2	1	0	1	3	2	+1
Cape Verde	0	2	0	0	2	0	4	–4

Jan 7, 1979

Guinea-Bissau	3 – 0	Cape Verde

Jan 9, 1979

Senegal	1 – 0	Cape Verde

Jan 11, 1979

Senegal	2 – 0	Guinea-Bissau

== Knockout stage ==
=== Semi-finals ===
Jan 13, 1979

Mali	1 – 1 (4 – 2 pen.)	Guinea-Bissau

Jan 13, 1979

Senegal	3 – 1	Guinea

=== Third place match ===
Jan 14, 1979

Guinea	2 – 2 (5 – 4 pen.)	Guinea-Bissau

=== Final ===
Jan 14, 1979

Senegal	1 – 0	Mali
