= Mohamed Harouna =

Mauritanian footballer and coach

Mohamed Salem Ould Harouna, familiarly known as Sneïdry (born 1950 in Atar) is a Mauritanian footballer and coach.

After completing graduate study in Algiers and CREPS Reims, Haroun was a professor at the Centre National de Formation des Cadres de la Jeunesse et des Sports (CNFCJS) in Nouakchott. From 1982 to 1983, he coached the Mauritania national football team. From 1984 to 1988 he was director of studies at CNFCJS. From 1988 to 1990, Sneïdry was director of physical education and sports.

He led a rich sporting career. Sneïdry was university champion in 1975 in Algeria (100 m and long jump). In 1977, he became champion of the University of France in football (CREPS Reims). Chebab player in 1978, the Wharf and the Ksar until 1988, he holds several championship trophies and a national cup. He coached the Ksar repeatedly and the team representing Air Mauritania from 1999 to 2007.
