= Abdoulaye Khouma Keita =

Senegalese footballer

Personal information
- Date of birth: 23 October 1978 (age 48)
- Place of birth: Rufisque, Senegal
- Height: 1.92 m (6 ft 4 in)
- Position: Defensive midfielder

Senior career*
Years	Team	Apps	(Gls)
1999–2003	ASC Jeanne d'Arc		
2003–2004	Dinamo Tirana		
2004–2005	Iraklis	25	(2)
2005–2007	Nancy	3	(0)
2007–2008	Toulouse Fontaines Club		
2008–2019	AS Beauvais	59	(4)
2010–2014	Fréjus Saint-Raphaël	89	(5)

International career
1999	Senegal	1	(0)
- * Club domestic league appearances and goals

Abdoulaye Khouma Keita (born 23 October 1978) is a Senegalese former professional footballer who played as a defensive midfielder. He made one appearance for the Senegal national team in 1999.

He played on the professional level in Ligue 1 for AS Nancy.
