= CEDEAO Cup =

The CEDEAO Cup was an international men's football tournament for nations in the Economic Community of West African States (ECOWAS; Communauté Economique Des Etats de l'Afrique de l'Ouest, CEDEAO). The tournament was held biannually between 1983 and 1991, and may also have taken place in 1977, but few data are known.

== General statistics ==
Year	Host	Final			Third place match		
Year	Host	Champion	Score	Second Place	Third Place	Score	Fourth Place
1977; Details	Nigeria	Nigeria	–		unclear		
1983; Details	Ivory Coast	Ivory Coast	2–1; 1–0	Nigeria	unclear		
1985; Details	Senegal	Senegal	Group system	Ivory Coast	Guinea		—
1987; Details	Liberia	Ivory Coast	2–1	Liberia	Senegal	1–0	Burkina Faso
1990; Details	Nigeria	Nigeria	1–1	Senegal	Ivory Coast	1–0	Liberia
1991; Details	Ivory Coast	Ivory Coast	1–0	Senegal	Ghana	1–0	Nigeria

=== Most CEDEAO Cup wins ===
Wins	Nation	Year(s)
3 times	Ivory Coast	1983, 1987, 1991
2 times	Nigeria	1977, 1990
1 time	Senegal	1985

== 1983 CEDEAO Cup ==
=== Qualifying round ===
==== First qualifying round ====
17 January 1983

Benin	1–1	Mauritania

4 February 1983

Mauritania	2–0	Benin

13 January 1983

Niger	2–0	Senegal

6 February 1983

Senegal	2–0	Niger

2–2 on aggregate; Senegal won on penalty shootout.

6 February 1983

Sierra Leone	0–1	Gambia

20 February 1983

Gambia	0–1	Sierra Leone

1–1 on aggregate; Gambia won on penalty shootout.

13 February 1983

Guinea	1–1	Mali

27 February 1983

Mali	1–1	Guinea

2–2 on aggregate; Mali won on penalty shootout.

17 April 1983

Guinea-Bissau	2–0	Togo

8 May 1983

Togo	3–0	Guinea-Bissau

Nigeria	w/o	Ghana

Ghana withdrew; Nigeria advanced.

==== Second qualifying round ====
3 July 1983

Gambia	1–1	Mali

17 July 1983

Mali	0–0	Gambia

Mali advanced, possibly by away goals rule.

12 August 1983

Mauritania	0–4	Togo

The return round was not played. Togo advanced.

15 November 1983

Nigeria	1–0	Senegal

19 November 1983

Senegal	0–1	Nigeria

Nigeria advanced.

=== Final round ===
The final round was held in Abidjan, Ivory Coast.

==== Semi-finals ====
15 December 1983

Ivory Coast	1–1 (a.e.t.)	Mali

Ivory Coast won on penalties

16 December 1983

Togo	5–2	Nigeria

==== Third place match ====
18 December 1983

Mali	0–0 (a.e.t.)	Nigeria

Unknown who won the match

==== Final ====
18 December 1983

Ivory Coast	(Abandoned)	Togo

Abandoned at 2–1 in extra time (105').

Replay

20 December 1983

Ivory Coast	1–0	Togo

== 1985 CEDEAO Cup ==
=== Qualifying round ===
==== First round ====
7 April 1985

Mali	4–0	Togo

Bamako
21 April 1985

Togo	3–0	Mali

Lomé

==== Second round ====
11 August 1985

Guinea	1–1	Mali

Conakry
15 August 1985

Mali	1–1	Guinea
Penalties
	2–4

=== Final round ===
- The final round was played in Senegal.
- Senegal qualified as hosts, Ivory Coast as holders.

Team	Pld	W	D	L	GF	GA	Pts
Senegal	2	2	0	0	5	1	4
Ivory Coast	2	1	0	1	1	2	2
Guinea	2	0	0	2	1	4	0

25 December 1985	Senegal	3–1	Guinea
27 December 1985	Ivory Coast	1–0	Guinea
29 November 1985	Senegal	2–0	Ivory Coast

== 1987 CEDEAO Cup ==
=== Preliminary round ===
22 November 1987

Ivory Coast	3–0	Togo

Abidjan
13 December 1987

Togo	1–0	Ivory Coast

Lomé

=== Final round ===
- The final round was held in Monrovia, Liberia.
- Burkina Faso, Liberia and Senegal received byes to final round.

==== Semi-finals ====
19 December 1987

Ivory Coast	1–0	Senegal

20 December 1987

Liberia	1–0	Burkina Faso
Weah

==== Third place match ====
22 December 1987

Senegal	1–0	Burkina Faso

==== Final ====
23 December 1987

Ivory Coast	2–1	Liberia
Goal		Weah ?

== 1990 CEDEAO Cup ==
=== Qualifying round ===
The qualifying tournament was held in Liberia.

Team	Pld	W	D	L	GF	GA	Pts
Liberia	2	1	1	0	3	1	3
Ghana	2	0	2	0	2	2	2
Guinea	2	0	1	1	1	3	1

26 November 1989	Guinea	1–1	Ghana
28 November 1989	Liberia	2–0	Guinea
29 November 1989	Liberia	1–1	Ghana

=== Final round ===
- The final round was played in Nigeria.
- Nigeria qualified as hosts, Ivory Coast as holders. Circumstances of Senegal's qualification were unclear.

==== Semi-finals ====
24 January 1990

Senegal	1–0	Liberia

25 January 1990

Nigeria	2–0	Ivory Coast

==== Third place match ====
27 January 1990

Ivory Coast	1–0	Liberia

==== Final ====
28 January 1990

Nigeria	1–1	Senegal

Some sources record the score as 0–0. Nigeria won on penalty shootout.

== 1991 CEDEAO Cup ==
Held in Abidjan, Ivory Coast.

=== Semi-finals ===
31 October 1991

Senegal	3–2	Ghana
Sarr 22'; Diagne 60'; Sène 88'		Akonnor 62'; Yaw 75'

31 October 1991

Ivory Coast	2–0	Nigeria
Sié 10'; A. Traoré 30'

=== Third place match ===
2 November 1991

Ghana	1–0	Nigeria
N. Mensah 11'

=== Final ===
2 November 1991

Ivory Coast	1–0	Senegal
A. Traoré 7'
