= 2005 Amílcar Cabral Cup =

Tournament details
- Host country: Guinea
- Teams: 6 (from 1 confederation)
- Venue(s): 1 (in 1 host city)

Final positions
- Champions: Guinea (5th title)
- Runners-up: Senegal
- Third place: Mali

Tournament statistics
- Matches played: 10
- Goals scored: 18 (1.8 per match)
- Top scorer(s): (Guinea-Bissau) Anibal Co (2)

The 2005 Amílcar Cabral Cup was held in Conakry, Guinea at the Stade du 28 Septembre. The winner was Guinea, which beat Senegal 1-0.

== Group stage ==
=== Group A ===
Team	Pts	Pld	W	D	L	GF	GA	GD
Guinea	4	2	1	1	0	3	2	+1
Guinea-Bissau	2	2	0	2	0	3	3	0
Sierra Leone	1	2	0	1	1	2	3	–1

November 18, 2005

Guinea	2 - 2	Guinea-Bissau
Ali Maneah Soumah 7'; Ousmane N'Gom Camara 75'		Anibal Co 31'; Moía Braima Mané 51'

Stade du 28 Septembre, Conakry, Guinea
November 20, 2005

Guinea-Bissau	1 - 1	Sierra Leone
Agostinho Soares 62'		Mustapha Bangura 49'

Stade du 28 Septembre, Conakry, Guinea
November 21, 2005

Guinea	1 - 0	Sierra Leone
Bachir Kaba 19'

Stade du 28 Septembre, Conakry, Guinea

=== Group B ===
Team	Pts	Pld	W	D	L	GF	GA	GD
Senegal (U-23 Team)	4	2	1	1	0	2	1	+1
Mali	4	2	1	1	0	2	1	+1
Gambia	0	2	0	0	2	0	2	–2

Senegal was placed first by drawing lot.

November 19, 2005

(U-23 Team) Senegal	1 - 1	Mali
Babacar Dione 73'		Tenema N'Diaye 10'

Stade du 28 Septembre, Conakry, Guinea
November 21, 2005

Gambia	0 - 1	Senegal (U-23 Team)
		Ibrahima Ndione 81'

Stade du 28 Septembre, Conakry, Guinea
November 23, 2005

Mali	1 - 0	Gambia
Boubacar Kone

Stade du 28 Septembre, Conakry, Guinea

== Knockout stage ==
=== Semifinals ===
November 25, 2005

Mali	0 - 0 (5 - 6 pen.)	Guinea

Stade du 28 Septembre, Conakry, Guinea
November 25, 2005

(U-23 Team) Senegal	1 - 1 (3 - 0 pen.)	Guinea-Bissau
Babacar M'Bengue 23'		Anibal Co 39' (pen.)

Stade du 28 Septembre, Conakry, Guinea

=== Third place match ===
November 27, 2005

Mali	1 - 0	Guinea-Bissau
Janvier Abouta 53'

Stade du 28 Septembre, Conakry, Guinea

=== Final ===
November 27, 2005

Guinea	1 - 0	Senegal (U-23 Team)
Pascal Baruxakis 5'

Stade du 28 Septembre, Conakry, Guinea
