= Mauritania national football team =

Men's national association football team representing Mauritania

Mauritania
- Nickname(s): Les Mourabitounes; Lions of Chinguetti
- Association: Fédération de Football de la République Islamique de Mauritanie (FFRIM)
- Confederation: CAF (Africa)
- Sub-confederation: WAFU (West Africa)
- Head coach: Aritz López Garai
- Captain: Aly Abeid
- Most caps: Souleymane Diallo (76)
- Top scorer: Bessam (13)
- Home stadium: Stade Olympique de Nouakchott
- FIFA code: MTN
First colours	Second colours

FIFA ranking
- Current: 118 ▼8 (18 November 2026)
- Highest: 81 (July 2017)
- Lowest: 206 (November 2012 – January 2013)

First international
- Madagascar 5–1 Mauritania (Abidjan, Côte d'Ivoire; 25 December 1961)

Biggest win
- Somalia 2–8 Mauritania (Beirut, Lebanon; 27 December 2006)

Biggest defeat
- Guinea 14–0 Mauritania (Guinea; 20 May 1972)

Africa Cup of Nations
- Appearances: 3 (first in 2019)
- Best result: Round of 16 (2023)

FIFA Arab Cup
- Appearances: 2 (first in 1985)
- Best result: Group stage (1985, 2021)

The Mauritania national football team (Arabic: منتخب مُورِيتَانْيَا لِكُرَةِ الْقَدَم) represents Mauritania in men's international football. It is controlled by the Football Federation of the Islamic Republic of Mauritania, and is a member of the Confederation of African Football. They have not qualified for the FIFA World Cup. However, in the Amílcar Cabral Cup, a regional tournament for West Africa, Mauritania came fourth in 1980 on hosting the competition. The national football team of Mauritania was later runners-up in 1995, losing on penalties to Sierra Leone after the final finished 0–0.

On 18 November 2018, Mauritania qualified for the Africa Cup of Nations for the first time in history, after they won 2–1 against Botswana to seal a spot in the 2019 tournament.

== History ==
=== 1963–1980 ===
Mauritania played its first match after independence from France on 11 April 1963, against Congo Kinshasa (also making their debut) and lost 6–0. The match was held in Dakar, Senegal as part of the L'Amitié tournament between African sides. It also saw the debuts of Chad, Liberia and Niger. Mauritania lost its three other matches in the tournament: 2–0 to the Ivory Coast, 4–0 to Tunisia and 7–0 to Congo Brazzaville.

Mauritania's first goal and avoidance of defeat came four years after their debut, in 1967 with a 1–1 draw away in Tanzania. This was their first match since the L'Amitié tournament in 1963.

Mauritania entered their first African Games qualification campaign, in an aim to reach the 1973 finals in Nigeria. They were drawn in a group against Mali and Guinea in Guinea. The first game was lost 11–0 to Mali, and on 20 May Mauritania lost 14–0 to Guinea. Mauritania did not qualify.

In May 1976 Mauritania entered qualification for the football at the 1976 Summer Olympics in Canada. They were drawn against neighbouring Mali in a two-legged qualifier. The first leg was lost 6–0 away on 1 May, and the second leg was lost 1–0 at home on 18 May. Mali did not qualify for the finals.

Mauritania's first entrance into World Cup qualification was an attempt to reach the 1978 FIFA World Cup in Argentina. In March 1976 they were one of four countries put into two preliminary matches at the start of the African qualification campaign. Mauritania's preliminary was a two-legged match against the Upper Volta (now Burkina Faso) and they drew the first match 1–1 away in Ouagadougou on 13 March. This was their first competitive avoidance of defeat, and their first avoidance of defeat since 1967. On 28 March, Mauritania lost their home leg in Nouakchott 2–0 and the Upper Volta advanced 3–1 on aggregate.

On 12 October 1980, seventeen years after their first game, Mauritania won for the first time by beating Mali 2–1 at home in a qualifier for the African Cup of Nations. Mali won 3–2 on aggregate having won the first leg 2–0.

=== 1998 FIFA World Cup qualification ===
Mauritania entered qualification for the 1998 FIFA World Cup in France, which was their first entry in twenty years and second overall. Again, they were drawn to face Burkina Faso in a two-legged preliminary. The first leg was played at home in Nouakchott in front of 15,000 people on 31 May 1996, one day before any other matches in the round. The match finished 0–0. The second leg was played at the Stade du 4-Aout in Ouagadougou on 16 June 1996 in front of 13,000 people. Burkina Faso won 2–0 to advance to the final group phase.

=== 2002 FIFA World Cup qualification ===
Mauritania entered the qualification for the 2002 FIFA World Cup and were placed in a preliminary against Tunisia, who had qualified for the previous tournament. On 7 April 2000 they hosted Tunisia at the Stade Olympique in Nouakchott. A crowd of 10,000 saw Tunisia win 2–1 with second-half goals from Radhi Jaidi and Hassen Gabsi. In the second leg on 22 April 2000, Mauritania were beaten 3–0 at the Stade El Menzah in Tunis. The match was watched by only 3,000, despite a capacity of 45,000 in the ground. Tunisia won 5–1 on aggregate and later qualified for the finals in South Korea and Japan.

=== 2006 FIFA World Cup qualification ===
Mauritania were drawn with Zimbabwe in the preliminary of the African section of the 2006 FIFA World Cup qualification. On 12 October 2003 they lost the away leg 3–0 at the National Sports Stadium in Harare in front of 55,000 people. In the home return at the Stade Olympique on 14 November 2003, Mauritania scored twice in the opening ten minutes to win 2–1, their first victory in a World Cup match. However, Zimbabwe advanced 4–2 on aggregate.

=== 2010 FIFA World Cup qualification ===
The African qualification process was altered for the 2010 FIFA World Cup. Only the six lowest-ranked nations played a preliminary, a selection which for the first time did not include Mauritania. Mauritania played in Group 8 of the second qualifying round against Rwanda, Morocco and Ethiopia, and started with an away match at the Stade Regional Nyamirambo in Kigali, Rwanda on 31 May 2008. They lost 3–0 in front of 12,000 people. The first home match was on 7 June at the Stade Nacional in Nouakchott against Morocco. The Moroccans scored two in each half before a late penalty by Dominique da Silva of Mauritania made the game 4–1.

On 13 June 2008 Mauritania hosted Ethiopia at the Stade Nacional and lost 1–0 after an injury-time winner from Saladin Said. On 22 June Mauritania lost 6–1 in the away match versus Ethiopia at the Addis Ababa Stadium. The Ethiopian forwards Fikru Tefera and Andualem Nigussie scored two goals each in a match which also saw Ba Yaoub of Mauritania sent off after 37 minutes, conceding a penalty to Fikru. The game was 1–1 at half time. In September 2008 Ethiopia were expelled from the tournament due to government interferences in their football association and all of their results annulled.

Only 1,000 people saw Mauritania's next game at the Stade Nacional as they were beaten 1–0 by Rwanda on 6 September with a late goal by Bobo Bola. Mauritania finished their group campaign at the Stade Moulay Abdellah in Rabat, Morocco. Like the home game against the Moroccans, Mauritania were 4–0 down but scored the last goal, this time by Dahmed Ould Teguedi. Although the Moroccan stadium had a capacity of 52,000, only 1,472 saw the match.

=== 2015 Africa Cup of Nations qualification ===
Mauritania beat Mauritius 1–0 in the first leg of a preliminary round qualifier for the 2015 Africa Cup of Nations in Nouakchott. SC Bastia's midfielder Adama Ba scored the only goal midway through the first half. The return leg in Curepipe ended 2–0 in favour of Mauritania. Scorers were Demba Sow and Moulaye Ahmed Bessam.

In the first round, first leg match, Mauritania beat visitors Equatorial Guinea 1–0 in Nouakchott. The two sides headed into the break scoreless in their match played at Office du Complexe Olympique de Nouakchott. Hosts Mauritania broke the deadlock in the 76th minute through their Tunisian-based striker Ismaël Diakité. In the return match Equatorial Guinea beat Mauritania 3–0 in Malabo. Equatorial Guinea won 3–1 on aggregate. However, on 3 July 2014, the CAF announced that Equatorial Guinea were disqualified for fielding the ineligible player Thierry Fidjeu in the tie, and as a result, Mauritania advanced to the second round. Equatorial Guinea later qualified for the final tournament as replacement hosts.

=== 2019 Africa Cup of Nations ===
On 18 November 2018, Mauritania qualified to the 2019 Africa Cup of Nations for the first time in their history, after they won 2–1 against Botswana, coming second in qualification Group I.

== Team image ==
The Mauritania national team home kit is all green yellow red trim, and the away kit is all white with green trim.

== Results and fixtures ==
The following is a list of match results in the last 12 months, as well as any future matches that have been scheduled.

Win Draw Loss Fixture

=== 2025 ===
12 November Friendly	Tunisia	1–1	Mauritania	Tunis, Tunisia
17:45 UTC+1	Chaouat 38'	Report	M. Sarr 50'	Stadium: Hammadi Agrebi Stadium; Referee: Mohamed Rafiq Aouina (Algeria)

15 November Friendly	Libya	1–0	Mauritania	Benina, Libya
16:00 UTC+2	Mahmoud Al-Shalwi 31'	Report		Stadium: Benina Martyrs Stadium

25 November 2025 FIFA Arab Cup qualification	Mauritania	0–2	Kuwait	Al-Rayyan, Qatar
16:00 UTC+3		Report	Daham 8', 24'	Stadium: Jassim Bin Hamad Stadium; Referee: Ma Ning (China)

=== 2026 ===
27 March Friendly	Argentina	2–1	Mauritania	Buenos Aires, Argentina
20:15 UTC−3	Fernández 17'; Paz 32'	Report	Lefort 90+4'	Stadium: La Bombonera; Attendance: 45,760; Referee: Derlis López (Paraguay)

5 June Friendly	Angola	1–1	Mauritania	Casablanca, Morocco
20:00	Keliano 85'	Report	Thiam 90+1'	Stadium: Larbi Zaouli Stadium; Referee: Hicham Temsamani (Morocco)

8 June Friendly	Mauritania	1–0	Niger	Casablanca, Morocco
20:00 UTC+1	I. Thiam 90+6'	Report		Stadium: Père Jégo Stadium; Referee: Mustapha Kechchaf (Morocco)

24 September 2027 AFCON qualification	Mauritania	3–1	Central African Republic	Casablanca, Morocco
16:00 UTC+0	Koïta 32' (pen.); Camara 69'; Diallo 89'	Report	Koyalipou 48'	Stadium: Larbi Zaouli Stadium; Referee: Boubou Traoré (Mali)

29 September 2027 AFCON qualification	Benin	v	Mauritania	Abidjan, Ivory Coast
17:00 UTC+0				Stadium: Alassane Ouattara Stadium

11 November 2027 AFCON qualification	Burkina Faso	v	Mauritania	TBD, Burkina Faso
TBD				Stadium: TBD

15 November 2027 AFCON qualification	Mauritania	v	Burkina Faso	TBD, Mauritania
TBD				Stadium: TBD

=== 2027 ===
24 March 2027 AFCON qualification	Central African Republic	v	Mauritania	TBD, Central African Republic
TBD				Stadium: TBD

28 March 2027 AFCON qualification	Mauritania	v	Benin	TBD, Mauritania
TBD				Stadium: TBD

== Coaches ==
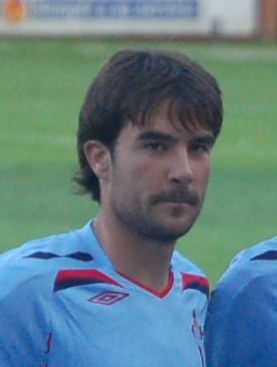
Aritz López Garai is the current manager of the national football team of Mauritania

- (Mauritania) Mohamed Harouna (1982–1983)
- (West Germany) Gerhard Schmidt (1985)
- (Mauritania) Birama Gaye (2000)
- (France) Noël Tosi (2003–2004)
- (Mauritania) Moustapha Sall (2006–2007)
- (Mauritania) Birama Gaye (2007)
- (France) Alain Moizan (2008)
- (Mauritania) Mohamed Harouna (2008)
- (Mauritania) Omar Hassan (2010)
- (Mauritania) Moustapha Sall (2010–2012)
- (France) Patrice Neveu (2012–2014)
- (France) Corentin Martins (2014–2021)
- (France) Gérard Buscher (2021)
- (France) Didier Gomes Da Rosa (2021–2022)
- (Comoros) Amir Abdou (2022–2024)
- (Spain) Aritz López Garai (2025–present)

== Players ==
=== Current squad ===
The following players were called up for the 2027 Africa Cup of Nations qualification matches against Central African Republic and Benin on 24 and 29 September 2026; respectively.

Caps and goals correct as of 8 June 2026, after the match against Niger.

No.	Pos.	Player	Date of birth (age)	Caps	Goals	Club
	GK	Babacar Niasse	20 December 1996 (age 29)	27	0	(Royal Moroccan Football Federation) Difaâ El Jadidi
	GK	Babacar Diop	17 September 1995 (age 31)	14	0	(Football Federation of the Islamic Republic of Mauritania) Nouadhibou
	GK	Mamadou Diop	3 January 2000 (age 26)	8	0	(French Football Federation) Auxerre
	DF	Aly Abeid	11 December 1997 (age 28)	69	3	(Algerian Football Federation) JS Kabylie
	DF	Ibrahima Keita	8 November 2001 (age 25)	33	0	Free agent
	DF	Lamine Ba	24 August 1997 (age 29)	30	1	(Polish Football Association) Śląsk Wrocław
	DF	Nouh Mohamed El Abd	24 December 2000 (age 25)	30	1	(Algerian Football Federation) JS Kabylie
	DF	Khadim Diaw	7 July 1998 (age 28)	25	0	(Algerian Football Federation) Olympique Akbou
	DF	Demine Saleck	30 November 1994 (age 31)	16	0	(Football Federation of the Islamic Republic of Mauritania) Nouadhibou
	DF	Jordan Lefort	9 August 1993 (age 33)	4	1	(French Football Federation) Angers
	DF	Mohamed Ali Diadié	22 October 2004 (age 22)	0	0	(Portuguese Football Federation) Torreense
	DF	Baïla Diallo	24 June 2001 (age 25)	0	0	(Royal Spanish Football Federation) Granada
	MF	Abdallahi Mahmoud	4 May 2000 (age 26)	46	2	(Football Federation of the Islamic Republic of Mauritania) Nouadhibou
	MF	Mouhsine Bodda	18 July 1997 (age 29)	37	1	(Football Federation of the Islamic Republic of Mauritania) AS Douanes
	MF	Yacoub Sidi Ethmane	10 December 1995 (age 30)	18	1	(Libyan Football Federation) Al Tahaddy
	MF	Oumar Ngom	9 March 2004 (age 22)	16	0	(Italian Football Federation) Lecce
	MF	Abdoullah Ba	31 July 2003 (age 23)	0	0	(The Football Association) Sunderland
	MF	Bahmed Deuff	10 March 2006 (age 20)	0	0	(Royal Belgian Football Association) Royal Antwerp
	MF	Mamadou Fofana	17 September 2000 (age 26)	0	0	(French Football Federation) Nancy
	FW	Hemeya Tanjy	1 May 1998 (age 28)	46	7	(Iraq Football Association) Al-Jolan
	FW	Idrissa Thiam	2 September 2000 (age 26)	40	1	(Egyptian Football Association) Al Mokawloon Al Arab
	FW	Aboubakary Koïta	20 September 1998 (age 28)	23	3	(Hellenic Football Federation) AEK Athens
	FW	Pape Ndiaga Yade	5 January 2000 (age 26)	16	1	(Ukrainian Association of Football) LNZ Cherkasy
	FW	Mamadou Diallo	3 December 1996 (age 29)	6	0	(Bulgarian Football Union) CSKA 1948
	FW	Ahmed Mubarek	6 March 2002 (age 24)	6	0	(Sudan Football Association) Al Hilal
	FW	Djeidi Gassama	10 September 2003 (age 23)	3	0	(Scottish Football Association) Rangers
	FW	Dawda Camara	4 November 2002 (age 24)	0	0	(Portuguese Football Federation) Alverca

=== Recent call-ups ===
The following players have been called up for Mauritania in the last 12 months.

Pos.	Player	Date of birth (age)	Caps	Goals	Club	Latest call-up
GK	Abderrahmane Sarr	1 April 2005 (age 21)	8	0	(Norway) Tromsø	v. Palestine, 31 March 2026
DF	Saïd Imigene	16 January 2005 (age 21)	0	0	(Spain) Leganés	v. Palestine, 31 March 2026
DF	Abdellahi El Id	7 May 2001 (age 25)	0	0	(Mauritania) AS Douanes	v. Kuwait, 25 November 2025
DF	Mohamed Sarr	28 October 2002 (age 24)	0	0	(Mauritania) Nouadhibou	v. Kuwait, 25 November 2025
DF	Mohamed Zweide	25 March 2001 (age 25)	0	0	(Mauritania) Nouadhibou	v. Kuwait, 25 November 2025
MF	Moctar Sidi El Hacen	10 December 1995 (age 30)	59	9	(Morocco) Difaâ El Jadidi	v. Palestine, 31 March 2026
MF	Sidi Bouna Amar	31 December 1998 (age 27)	32	2	(Libya) Al Ittihad	v. Palestine, 31 March 2026
MF	Guessouma Fofana	17 December 1992 (age 33)	32	0	(Sudan) Al Hilal	v. Palestine, 31 March 2026
MF	Beyatt Lekweiry	11 April 2005 (age 21)	12	0	(Switzerland) Lausanne-Sport	v. Palestine, 31 March 2026
MF	Maata Magassa	31 October 2003 (age 23)	7	0	(Egypt) ZED	v. Palestine, 31 March 2026
MF	Amar Haïdara	28 November 2003 (age 22)	0	0	(Latvia) Liepāja	v. Palestine, 31 March 2026
MF	Bakari Camara	4 January 1994 (age 32)	13	0	(France) Nancy	v. Kuwait, 25 November 2025
MF	Mohamed Saïd	25 February 2000 (age 26)	0	0	(Mauritania) Nouadhibou	v. Kuwait, 25 November 2025
MF	Abderrahmane Soumaré	11 November 2006 (age 20)	0	0	(Portugal) Alverca	v. Libya, 15 November 2025
FW	Souleymane Anne	12 May 1997 (age 29)	14	1	(Qatar) Al Kharaitiyat	v. Palestine, 31 March 2026
FW	Mamadou Sy	31 December 2000 (age 25)	10	1	(Rwanda) APR	v. Kuwait, 25 November 2025
FW	Ahmed El Moctar	15 November 2003 (age 23)	6	1	(Mauritania) Tevragh-Zeina	v. Kuwait, 25 November 2025
FW	El Mami Tetah	12 November 2001 (age 25)	5	0	(Mauritania) AS Douanes	v. Kuwait, 25 November 2025
^{DEC} Player refused to join the team after the call-up.^{INJ} Player withdrew from the squad due to an injury.^{PRE} Preliminary squad.^{RET} Player has retired from international football.^{SUS} Suspended from the national team.

== Records ==
As of 9 September 2025
Players in bold are still active with Mauritania.

=== Most appearances ===
Rank	Player	Caps	Goals	Career
1	Souleymane Diallo	76	0	2006–2019
2	**Mohamed Dellahi Yali**	75	3	2015–present
3	**Aly Abeid**	71	4	2015–present
4	Ismaël Diakité	68	9	2008–2022
5	Bessam	66	13	2013–2023
6	Abdoulaye Gaye	58	2	2012–2020
7	**Hacen El Ide**	56	9	2013–present
8	Abdoul Ba	52	0	2013–2022
8	**Hemeya Tanjy**	52	8	2018–present
10	Moustapha Diaw	50	1	2015–2021

=== Top goalscorers ===
Rank	Player	Goals	Caps	Ratio	Career
1	Bessam	13	66	0.2	2013–2023
2	**Hacen El Ide**	9	56	0.16	2013–present
2	Ismaël Diakité	9	68	0.13	2008–2022
4	**Aboubakar Kamara**	8	29	0.28	2021–present
4	**Hemeya Tanjy**	8	52	0.15	2018–present
6	Boubacar Bagili	6	35	0.17	2015–2019
6	Adama Ba	6	48	0.13	2013–2022
8	Ahmed Sidibé	5	19	0.26	1994–2008
8	Brahim Ould Malha	5	23	0.22	1994–2002
8	Mamadou Niass	5	45	0.11	2013–2023

== Competitive record ==
=== FIFA World Cup ===
FIFA World Cup record									Qualification record					
Year	Round	Position	Pld	W	D	L	GF	GA	Pld	W	D	L	GF	GA
1930 to 1958	Part of France								Part of France					
1962 to 1970	Not a FIFA member								Not a FIFA member					
(West Germany) 1974	Did not enter								Did not enter					
(Argentina) 1978	Did not qualify								2	0	1	1	1	3
(Spain) 1982	Did not enter								Did not enter					
(Mexico) 1986	Did not enter								Did not enter					
(Italy) 1990	Did not enter								Did not enter					
(United States) 1994	Withdrew								Withdrew					
(France) 1998	Did not qualify								2	0	1	1	0	2
(South Korea) (Japan) 2002	Did not qualify								2	0	0	2	1	5
(Germany) 2006	Did not qualify								2	1	0	1	2	4
(South Africa) 2010	Did not qualify								4	0	0	4	2	12
(Brazil) 2014	Did not enter								Did not enter					
(Russia) 2018	Did not qualify								4	1	1	2	7	5
(Qatar) 2022	Did not qualify								6	0	2	4	2	11
(Canada) (Mexico) (United States) 2026	Did not qualify								10	1	4	5	4	13
(Morocco) (Portugal) (Spain) 2030	To be determined								To be determined					
(Saudi Arabia) 2034	To be determined								To be determined					
Total		0/13							32	3	9	20	19	55

=== Olympic Games ===
Olympic Games record
Appearances: 0
Year	Round	Position	Pld	W	D	L	GF	GA
1896 – 1960	Part of France							
(Japan) 1964	Did not enter							
(Mexico) 1968	Did not enter							
(West Germany) 1972	Did not enter							
(Canada) 1976	Did not qualify							
(Soviet Union) 1980	Did not enter							
(United States) 1984	Did not qualify							
(South Korea) 1988	Did not enter							
(Spain) 1992	Did not qualify							
(United States) 1996	Did not enter							
(Australia) 2000	Did not enter							
(Greece) 2004	Did not enter							
(China) 2008	Did not enter							
(United Kingdom) 2012	Did not enter							
(Brazil) 2016	Did not qualify							
(Japan) 2020	Did not qualify							
(France) 2024	Did not qualify							
Total		0/28						

- Football at the Summer Olympics has been an under-23 tournament since the 1992 edition.

=== Africa Cup of Nations ===
Africa Cup of Nations record									Qualification					
Appearances: 3									Qualification					
Year	Round	Position	Pld	W	D*	L	GF	GA	Pld	W	D*	L	GF	GA
(Sudan) 1957	Part of France								Part of France					
(United Arab Republic) 1959	Part of France								Part of France					
(Ethiopia) 1962	Not affiliated to CAF								Not affiliated to CAF					
(Ghana) 1963	Not affiliated to CAF								Not affiliated to CAF					
(Tunisia) 1965	Not affiliated to CAF								Not affiliated to CAF					
(Ethiopia) 1968	Not affiliated to CAF								Not affiliated to CAF					
(Sudan) 1970	Not affiliated to CAF								Not affiliated to CAF					
(Cameroon) 1972	Not affiliated to CAF								Not affiliated to CAF					
(Egypt) 1974	Not affiliated to CAF								Not affiliated to CAF					
(Ethiopia) 1976	Did not enter								Did not enter					
(Ghana) 1978	Did not enter								Did not enter					
(Nigeria) 1980	Did not qualify								2	0	0	2	3	6
(Libya) 1982	Did not qualify								2	0	0	2	3	2
(Ivory Coast) 1984	Did not enter								Did not enter					
(Egypt) 1986	Did not qualify								4	1	1	2	4	10
(Morocco) 1988	Did not enter								Did not enter					
(Algeria) 1990	Withdrew								Withdrew					
(Senegal) 1992	Did not qualify								6	0	0	6	1	18
(Tunisia) 1994	Withdrew								Withdrew					
(South Africa) 1996	Did not qualify								8	1	4	3	3	6
(Burkina Faso) 1998	Did not qualify								2	0	1	1	1	4
(Ghana) (Nigeria) 2000	Withdrew								Withdrew					
(Mali) 2002	Did not qualify								2	0	1	1	0	3
(Tunisia) 2004	Did not qualify								6	0	2	4	0	10
(Egypt) 2006	Did not qualify								2	0	0	2	2	4
(Ghana) 2008	Did not qualify								6	2	1	3	9	10
(Angola) 2010	Did not qualify								4	0	0	4	2	12
(Equatorial Guinea) (Gabon) 2012	Withdrew								Withdrew					
(South Africa) 2013	Did not enter								Did not enter					
(Equatorial Guinea) 2015	Did not qualify								4	2	0	2	3	3
(Gabon) 2017	Did not qualify								6	2	2	2	6	5
(Egypt) 2019	Group stage	19th	3	0	2	1	1	4	6	4	0	2	7	6
(Cameroon) 2021	Group stage	24th	3	0	0	3	0	7	6	2	3	1	5	4
(Ivory Coast) 2023	Round of 16	16th	4	1	0	3	3	5	6	3	1	2	9	7
(Morocco) 2025	Did not qualify								6	2	1	3	3	6
(Kenya) (Tanzania) (Uganda) 2027	To be determined								To be determined					
2028	To be determined								To be determined					
Total	Round of 16	3/35	10	1	2	7	4	16	78	19	17	42	61	116

=== African Games ===
African Games record
Appearances: 0
Year	Round	Position	Pld	W	D	L	GF	GA
(Republic of the Congo) 1965	Did not enter							
(Nigeria) 1973	Did not qualify							
(Algeria) 1978	Did not enter							
(Kenya) 1987	Did not enter							
(Egypt) 1991	Did not enter							
(Zimbabwe) 1995	Did not enter							
(South Africa) 1999	Did not enter							
(Nigeria) 2003	Withdrew							
(Algeria) 2007	Did not enter							
(Mozambique) 2011	Did not enter							
(Republic of the Congo) 2015	Did not enter							
(Morocco) 2019	Did not qualify							
(Ghana) 2023	Did not qualify							
Total		0/13						

- Prior to the Cairo 1991 campaign, the Football at the African Games was open to full senior national teams.

=== African Nations Championship ===
African Nations Championship record
Appearances: 3
Year	Round	Position	Pld	W	D	L	GF	GA
(Ivory Coast) 2009	Did not qualify							
(Sudan) 2011	Withdrew							
(South Africa) 2014	Group stage	14th	3	0	0	3	4	8
(Rwanda) 2016	Did not qualify							
(Morocco) 2018	Group stage	16th	3	0	0	3	0	6
(Ethiopia) 2020	Did not qualify							
(Algeria) 2022	Quarter-finals	7th	3	1	1	1	1	1
(Kenya) (Tanzania) (Uganda) 2024	Group stage		4	2	1	1	2	1
Total	Quarter-finals	4/8	13	3	2	8	7	16

=== WAFU Nations Cup ===
WAFU Nations Cup record
Appearances: 2
Year	Round	Position	Pld	W	D	L	GF	GA
(Nigeria) 2010	Did not enter							
(Nigeria) 2011	Did not enter							
(Ghana) 2013	Did not enter							
(Ghana) 2017	Round 1	11th	1	0	0	1	1	3
(Senegal) 2019	Round 1	9th	2	0	2	0	1	1
(Nigeria) 2021	Cancelled							
Total	Round 1	2/5	2	0	2	1	2	4

=== Amílcar Cabral Cup ===
Amílcar Cabral Cup record
Appearances: 16
Year	Round	Position	Pld	W	D	L	GF	GA
(Guinea-Bissau) 1979	Group stage	7th	3	0	0	3	4	11
(The Gambia) 1980	**Fourth place**	**4th**	**4**	**1**	**1**	**2**	**4**	**6**
(Mali) 1981	Group stage	5th	3	1	0	2	2	4
(Cape Verde) 1982	Group stage	8th	3	1	0	2	3	8
(Mauritania) 1983	**Fourth place**	**4th**	**5**	**2**	**0**	**3**	**4**	**4**
(Sierra Leone) 1984	Group stage	8th	3	0	0	3	1	9
(The Gambia) 1985	Group stage	8th	3	0	0	3	0	6
(Senegal) 1986	Group stage	7th	3	0	0	3	1	5
(Guinea) 1987	Group stage	6th	3	0	1	2	1	3
(Guinea-Bissau) 1988	Group stage	7th	3	0	2	1	5	6
(Mali) 1989	Group stage	7th	2	0	0	2	2	5
(Senegal) 1991	Did not enter							
(Sierra Leone) 1993	Group stage	7th	3	0	1	2	0	5
(Mauritania) 1995	**Runners-up**	**2nd**	**5**	**3**	**2**	**0**	**7**	**3**
(The Gambia) 1997	Group stage	6th	3	0	2	1	4	5
(Cape Verde) 2000	Group stage	7th	3	0	2	1	3	4
(Mali) 2001	Group stage	6th	2	0	0	2	2	4
(Guinea) 2005	Did not enter							
(Guinea-Bissau) 2007	Withdrew							
Total	Runners-up	16/19	51	8	11	32	38	88

=== CEDEAO Cup ===
CEDEAO Cup record
Appearances: 1
Year	Round	Position	Pld	W	D	L	GF	GA
(Nigeria) 1977	Unknown							
(Ivory Coast) 1983	Did not qualify							
(Senegal) 1985	Did not enter							
(Liberia) 1987	Did not enter							
(Nigeria) 1990	Did not enter							
(Ivory Coast) 1991	Did not enter							
Total	Group stage	1/3	3	0	0	3	4	8

=== FIFA Arab Cup ===
FIFA Arab Cup record
Appearances: 2
Year	Round	Position	Pld	W	D	L	GF	GA
(Lebanon) 1963	Did not enter							
(Kuwait) 1964	Did not enter							
(Iraq) 1966	Did not enter							
(Saudi Arabia) 1985	Group stage	5th	2	0	0	2	0	4
(Jordan) 1988	Did not qualify							
(Syria) 1992	Withdrew							
(Qatar) 1998	Did not enter							
(Kuwait) 2002	Did not enter							
(Saudi Arabia) 2012	Did not enter							
(Qatar) 2021	Group stage	11th	3	1	0	2	3	7
(Qatar) 2025	Did not qualify							
Total	Group stage	2/10	5	1	0	4	3	11

=== Arab Games ===
Arab Games record
Appearances: 4
Year	Round	Position	Pld	W	D	L	GF	GA
(Egypt) 1953	Part of France							
(Lebanon) 1957	Part of France							
(Morocco) 1961	Did not enter							
(United Arab Republic) 1965	Did not enter							
(Syria) 1976	Group stage	7th	6	0	0	6	2	13
(Morocco) 1985	Group stage	11th	3	0	0	3	2	12
(Syria) 1992	Did not enter							
(Lebanon) 1997	Group stage	8th	3	0	0	3	2	6
(Jordan) 1999	Did not enter							
(Algeria) 2004	No tournament							
(Egypt) 2007	Did not enter							
(Qatar) 2011	Did not enter							
(Algeria) 2023	Group stage	7th	3	0	2	1	4	6
Total	Group stage	4/12	15	0	2	13	10	37

- Prior to the Doha 2011 campaign, the Football at the Arab Games was open to full senior national teams.

=== Other records ===
Year	Stage	Position
(Tunisia) 7th November Cup 1995	Group stage	3rd
(Senegal) Jeux de l’Amitié 1963	Group stage	16th
Total	0 titles	

== Honours ==
=== Regional ===
- **Amílcar Cabral Cup**
  - (silver) Runners-up (1): 1995

=== Awards ===
- African National Team of the Year (1): 2018
