= 1992 King Fahd Cup final tournament =

The final tournament of the 1992 King Fahd Cup began on 15 October and concluded on 20 October 1992 with the final at the King Fahd II Stadium, Riyadh. A third-place match was included and played between the two losing teams of the semi-finals.

In the knockout stage (including the final), if a match was level at the end of 90 minutes, extra time of two periods (15 minutes each) would be played. If the score was still level after extra time, the match would be decided by a penalty shoot-out.

== Bracket ==
Semi-finals
16 October – Riyadh
Argentina	4
Ivory Coast	0
15 October – Riyadh
United States	0
Saudi Arabia	3

Final
20 October – Riyadh
Argentina	3
Saudi Arabia	1
Third place
19 October – Riyadh
United States	5
Ivory Coast	2

== Semi-finals ==
=== United States v Saudi Arabia ===
15 October 1992
20:00

United States	0–3	Saudi Arabia
	Report	Al-Bishi 48' (pen.); Al-Thunayan 74'; Al-Muwallid 84'

King Fahd II Stadium, Riyadh
Attendance: 70,000
Referee: Ulisses Tavares da Silva (Brazil)

United States	Saudi Arabia

GK	1	Tony Meola
DF	3	Mike Lapper
DF	17	Marcelo Balboa
DF	21	Fernando Clavijo
MF	6	John Harkes	(yellow card) 73'
MF	7	Hugo Pérez
MF	9	Tab Ramos	Booked
MF	14	Brian Quinn
MF	19	Chris Henderson		(substituted off) 62'
FW	4	Bruce Murray	(yellow card) 36'	(substituted off) 45'
FW	22	Roy Wegerle
Substitutions:
DF	20	Paul Caligiuri		(substituted in) 45'
FW	12	Jean Harbor		(substituted in) 62'
Manager:
(Federal Republic of Yugoslavia) Bora Milutinović

GK	1	Saud Al-Otaibi
DF	2	Abdullah Al-Dosari
DF	3	Abdul Rahman Al-Roomi
DF	4	Salem Al-Alawi
MF	6	Fuad Anwar Amin
MF	8	Fahad Al-Bishi
MF	14	Khaled Al-Muwallid	(yellow card) 19'
MF	15	Yousuf Al-Thunayan
MF	16	Khaled Al-Hazaa
FW	10	Saeed Al-Owairan
FW	12	Sami Al-Jaber		(substituted off) 72'
Substitutions:
FW	11	Fahad Al-Mehallel		(substituted in) 72'
Manager:
(Brazil) Nelsinho Rosa

=== Argentina v Ivory Coast ===
16 October 1992

Argentina	4–0	Ivory Coast
Batistuta 2', 10'; Altamirano 67'; Acosta 81'	Report

King Fahd II Stadium, Riyadh
Attendance: 15,000
Referee: Jamal Al Sharif (Syria)

Argentina	Ivory Coast

GK	1	Sergio Goycochea
DF	2	Sergio Vázquez	(yellow card) 13'
DF	3	Ricardo Altamirano
DF	4	Fabián Basualdo
DF	6	Oscar Ruggeri
MF	5	Fernando Redondo
MF	8	José Luis Villarreal		(substituted off) 75'
MF	10	Diego Simeone
MF	20	Leonardo Rodríguez		(substituted off) 67'
FW	7	Claudio Caniggia
FW	9	Gabriel Batistuta
Substitutions:
FW	14	Alberto Acosta		(substituted in) 67'
MF	11	Diego Cagna		(substituted in) 75'
Manager:
Alfio Basile

GK	1	Alain Gouaméné
DF	2	Basile Aka Kouamé
DF	6	Sékana Diaby
DF	19	Sam Abouo	(yellow card) 5' (red card) 51'
DF	22	Lassina Dao
MF	7	Saint-Joseph Gadji-Celi	(yellow card) 44'
MF	14	Lucien Kassi-Kouadio		(substituted off) 56'
MF	17	Serge Maguy
FW	8	Oumar Ben Salah		(substituted off) 84'
FW	10	Abdoulaye Traoré
FW	21	Donald-Olivier Sié
Substitutions:
FW	12	Georges Lignon		(substituted in) 56'
FW	18	Eugène Beugré Yago		(substituted in) 84'
Manager:
Yeo Martial

== Third place match ==
19 October 1992

United States	5–2	Ivory Coast
Balboa 12'; Jones 31'; Wynalda 56'; Murray 67', 83'	Report	Traoré 16'; Sié 76'

King Fahd II Stadium, Riyadh
Attendance: 9,500
Referee: Rodrigo Badilla (Costa Rica)

United States	Ivory Coast

GK	1	Tony Meola
DF	2	Janusz Michallik
DF	3	Mike Lapper
DF	17	Marcelo Balboa
DF	20	Paul Caligiuri
MF	4	Bruce Murray
MF	7	Hugo Pérez
MF	19	Chris Henderson	(substituted off) 27'
MF	21	Fernando Clavijo
FW	10	Peter Vermes	(substituted off) 73'
FW	11	Eric Wynalda
Substitutions:
MF	13	Cobi Jones	(substituted in) 27'
MF	8	Dominic Kinnear	(substituted in) 73'
Manager:
(Federal Republic of Yugoslavia) Bora Milutinović

GK	1	Alain Gouaméné
DF	2	Basile Aka Kouamé
DF	5	Rufin Lué
DF	6	Sékana Diaby
DF	22	Lassina Dao		(substituted off) 45'
MF	4	Ibrahima Koné
MF	8	Oumar Ben Salah	(yellow card) 27'
MF	17	Serge Maguy
MF	21	Donald-Olivier Sié	(yellow card) 37'
FW	10	Abdoulaye Traoré
FW	18	Eugène Beugré Yago		(substituted off) 63'
Substitutions:
MF	7	Saint-Joseph Gadji-Celi		(substituted in) 45'
MF	14	Lucien Kassi-Kouadio		(substituted in) 63'
Manager:
Yeo Martial

== Final ==
The 1992 King Fahd Cup Final was held at King Fahd II Stadium, Riyadh, Saudi Arabia on 20 October 1992. The match was contested by Argentina and the hosts, Saudi Arabia. Argentina won their first King Fahd Cup/Confederations Cup title.

20 October 1992

Argentina	3–1	Saudi Arabia
Rodríguez 18'; Caniggia 24'; Simeone 64'	Report	Al-Owairan 65'

King Fahd II Stadium, Riyadh
Attendance: 75,000
Referee: Lim Kee Chong (Mauritius)
