= Ghana national football team results (1990–99) =

Ghana football results

This is a list of the Ghana national football team results from 1990 to 1999.

== Results ==
Key
Win
Draw
Defeat

=== 1990 ===
1 September 1990 1992 AFCON qualification	Ghana	1-0	Nigeria	Kumasi, Ghana
	Kwame Saara-Mensah 32'	Report		Stadium: Baba Yara Stadium; Referee: Célestin N'Cho (Ivory Coast)

30 September 1990 1992 AFCON qualification	Togo	0-1	Ghana	Lomé, Togo
		Report	Kwame Saara-Mensah 46'	Stadium: Stade de Kégué; Referee: Kouakou N'Dri (Ivory Coast)

14 October 1990 1992 AFCON qualification	Ghana	2-0	Burkina Faso	Accra, Ghana
	Addo 10'; Polley 62'	Report		Stadium: Ohene Djan Stadium; Referee: Omer Yengo (Congo)

=== 1991 ===
13 January 1991 1992 AFCON qualification	Ghana	4-0	Benin	Accra, Ghana
	Polley 8', 44'; Armah 6'; Naawu 60'	Report		Stadium: Ohene Djan Stadium; Referee: Paul-Alain Hioba-Hioba (Cameroon)

13 April 1991 1992 AFCON qualification	Nigeria	0-0	Ghana	Lagos, Nigeria
		Report		Stadium: Surulere Stadium

29 April 1991 1992 AFCON qualification	Ghana	2-0	Togo	Accra, Ghana
	Lamptey 43'; Baffoe 76'	Report		Stadium: Ohene Djan Stadium

13 July 1991 1992 AFCON qualification	Burkina Faso	2-1	Ghana	Ouagadougou, Burkina Faso
	Ilboudo 21'; Ouattara 87'	Report	Tetteh 17'	Stadium: Stade du 4 Août; Attendance: 18,000; Referee: Idrissa Sarr (Mauritania)

28 July 1991 1992 AFCON qualification	Benin	0-0	Ghana	Cotonou, Benin
		Report		Stadium: Stade de l'Amitié; Referee: ... (Siera Leone )

=== 1992 ===
13 January 1992 1992 AFCON GS	Ghana	1-0	Zambia	Ziguinchor
	Abedi Pele 64'	Report		Stadium: Stade Aline Sitoe Diatta; Attendance: 5,000

16 January 1992 1992 AFCON GS	Ghana	1-0	Egypt	Ziguinchor
	Yeboah 89'	Report		Stadium: Stade Aline Sitoe Diatta; Attendance: 5,000

20 January 1992 1992 AFCON QF	Ghana	2-1	Congo	Dakar
	Yeboah 29'; Abedi Pele 57'	Report	Tchibota 52'	Stadium: Stade de l'Amitié; Attendance: 7,500; Referee: Ibrahim Faye (Gambia)

23 January 1992 1992 AFCON SF	Ghana	2-1	Nigeria	Dakar
	Abedi Pele 43'; Polley 54'	Report	Adepoju 11'	Stadium: Stade de l'Amitié; Attendance: 25,000; Referee: Neji Jouini (Tunisia)

26 January 1992 1992 AFCON Final	Ivory Coast	0-0 (a.e.t.); Penalties; 11-10	Ghana	Dakar
	Aka (penalty scored); Hobou (penalty scored); Sekana (penalty scored); M. Traoré (penalty scored); Tiéhi (penalty missed); Gadji-Celi (penalty scored); Kouadio (penalty scored); Abouo (penalty scored); Maguy (penalty scored); Sie (penalty scored); Gouamené (penalty scored); Aka (penalty scored)	Report	(penalty scored) Baffoe; (penalty scored) Lamptey; (penalty scored) Naawu; (penalty missed) Asare; (penalty scored) Yeboah; (penalty scored) Manso; (penalty scored) Armah; (penalty scored) Aborah; (penalty scored) Ampeah; (penalty scored) Opoku Nti; (penalty scored) Ansah; (penalty missed) Baffoe	Stadium: Stade de l'Amitié; Attendance: 47,500; Referee: Badara Sène (Senegal)

15 August 1992 1994 AFCON qualification	Tanzania	2–2; Annulled	Ghana	Mwanza, Tanzania
	Bakari 35'; Mwamba 53'	Report	Hasule 22' (o.g.); Zblade 70'	Stadium: CCM Kirumba Stadium; Referee: Jonathan Gatera (Rwanda)

30 August 1992 1994 AFCON qualification	Ghana	3–0; Annulled	Burkina Faso	Accra Sports Stadium, Accra
	Yeboah 2', 4'; Ahmed 84'	Report		Referee: Sylvain Abikanlou (Benin)

25 October 1992 1994 FIFA World Cup qualification – R1	Burundi	1–0	Ghana	Bujumbura, Burundi
	Habimana 78'	Report		Stadium: Stade Prince Louis Rwagasore; Attendance: 7,000; Referee: Ali Tahir Hafidhi (Tanzania)

20 December 1992 1994 FIFA World Cup qualification – R1	Ghana	2–0	Algeria	Accra, Ghana
	Yeboah 24'; K. Ayew 82'	Report		Stadium: Accra Sports Stadium; Attendance: 40,000; Referee: Souleymane Badara Sene (Senegal)

=== 1993 ===
31 January 1993 1994 FIFA World Cup qualification – R1	Ghana	1–0	Burundi	Kumasi, Ghana
	A. Pele 19'	Report		Stadium: Kumasi Sports Stadium; Attendance: 31,711; Referee: Idrissa Sarr (Mauritania)

26 February 1993 1994 FIFA World Cup qualification – R1	Algeria	2–1	Ghana	Tlemcen, Algeria
	Brahimi 60'; Meziane 85'	Report	Akonnor 12'	Stadium: Stade Akid Lotfi; Attendance: 30,000; Referee: Lim Kee Chong (Mauritius)

10 April 1993 1994 AFCON qualification	Ghana	1–0	Liberia	Accra Sports Stadium, Accra
	Manso 87'	Report		Attendance: 35,000

25 July 1993 1994 AFCON qualification	Liberia	0–2	Ghana	Monrovia, Liberia
		Report	Yeboah; Abedi Pele	Stadium: Samuel Kanyon Doe Sports Complex

=== 1994 ===
9 March 1994 International friendly	Nigeria	0–0	Ghana
		Report

27 March 1994 1994 AFCON GS	Ghana	1–0	Guinea	Sousse, Tunisia
	Akunnor 87'	Report		Stadium: Sousse Olympic Stadium; Attendance: 10,000; Referee: Petros Mathabela (South Africa)

31 March 1994 1994 AFCON GS	Ghana	1–0	Senegal	Sousse, Tunisia
	Polley 42'	Report		Stadium: Sousse Olympic Stadium; Attendance: 6,000; Referee: Ali Bujsaim (United Arab Emirates)

3 April 1994 1994 AFCON QF	Ghana	1–2	Ivory Coast	Sousse, Tunisia
	Akonnor 77'	Report	Tiéhi 30'; A. Traoré 81'	Stadium: Sousse Olympic Stadium; Attendance: 8,000; Referee: Ali Bujsaim (United Arab Emirates)

4 September 1994 1996 AFCON qualification	Ghana	4 – 1	Sierra Leone	Accra, Ghana
	da Costa 55' (pen.); Duah 63'; Akonnor 72'; Aboagye 88'	Report	Conteh 87'	Stadium: Accra Sports Stadium

16 October 1994 1996 AFCON qualification	Niger	1 – 5 Annulled	Ghana	Niamey, Niger
	Hamidou 6' (pen.)	Report	Preko 2', 54', 87'; Ayew 67'; Addo 69'	Stadium: Stade Général Seyni Kountché; Attendance: 6,000; Referee: Yacouba Ouédraogo (Burkina Faso)

12 November 1994 1996 AFCON qualification	Gambia	1 – 2 Annulled	Ghana	Bakau, Gambia
	Manneh 20'	Report	Akonnor 34'; Amankwah 42'	Stadium: Independence Stadium (Bakau); Attendance: 30,000; Referee: Sackie Kennedy (Liberia)

=== 1995 ===
22 January 1995 1996 AFCON qualification	Ghana	3 – 1	Congo	Accra, Ghana
	Ahinful 39'; Mbélé 69' (o.g.); Ayew 70'	Report	Swing 80'	Stadium: Accra Sports Stadium; Attendance: 50,000

8 April 1995 1996 AFCON qualification	Sierra Leone	1 – 0	Ghana	Freetown, Sierra Leone
	Conteh 77' (pen.)	Report		Stadium: National Stadium; Attendance: 50,000

23 April 1995 1996 AFCON qualification	Ghana	1 – 0 Annulled	Niger	Accra, Ghana
	Yeboah 21'	Report		Stadium: Accra Sports Stadium; Attendance: 40,000

30 July 1995 1996 AFCON qualification	Congo	0 – 2	Ghana	Brazzaville, Republic of the Congo
		Report	Aboagye 57', 89'	Stadium: Stade Alphonse Massamba; Attendance: 21,000; Referee: Pinto (Angola)

=== 1996 ===
14 January 1996 1996 AFCON GS	Ghana	2–0	Ivory Coast	Port Elizabeth, South Africa
	Yeboah 20'; Pelé 70'	Report		Stadium: EPRU Stadium; Attendance: 8,000; Referee: Masayoshi Okada (Japan)

19 January 1996 1996 AFCON GS	Ghana	2–1	Tunisia	Port Elizabeth, South Africa
	Pelé 50'; Akonnor 77'	Report	Ben Younes 72'	Stadium: EPRU Stadium; Attendance: 1,000; Referee: Petros Mathabela (South Africa)

25 January 1996 1996 AFCON GS	Ghana	2–0	Mozambique	Bloemfontein, South Africa
	Pelé 42'; Aboagye 68'	Report		Stadium: Free State Stadium; Attendance: 3,500; Referee: Ali Bujsaim (United Arab Emirates)

28 January 1996 1996 AFCON QF	Ghana	1–0	Zaire	Port Elizabeth, South Africa
	Yeboah 22'	Report		Stadium: EPRU Stadium; Attendance: 8,000; Referee: Sidi Bekaye Magassa (Mali)

31 January 1996 1996 AFCON SF	South Africa	3–0	Ghana	Johannesburg, South Africa
	Moshoeu 22', 87'; Bartlett 46'	Report		Stadium: FNB Stadium; Attendance: 75,000; Referee: Gamal Al-Ghandour (Egypt)

3 February 1996 1996 AFCON 3rd place	Ghana	0–1	Zambia	Johannesburg, South Africa
		Report	J. Bwalya 51'	Stadium: FNB Stadium; Attendance: 80,000; Referee: Omer Yengo (Republic of the Congo)

8 June 1996 1998 FIFA World Cup qualification R1	Tanzania	0–0	Ghana	Dar es Salaam, Tanzania
16:00		Report		Stadium: National Stadium; Attendance: 15,000; Referee: Charles Baku Ndukize (Burundi)

17 June 1996 1998 FIFA World Cup qualification R1	Ghana	2–1	Tanzania	Kumasi, Ghana
15:00	Johnson 70'; Augustine 81'	Report	Daima 71'	Stadium: Kumasi Sports Stadium; Attendance: 45,000; Referee: Lucien Bouchardeau (Niger)

6 October 1996 1998 AFCON qualification	Ghana	2–1	Angola	Accra Sports Stadium, Accra
	Aboagye 7'; Kim Grant 30'	Report	Paulão 2'	Attendance: 34,000; Referee: Jean-Fidèle Diramba (Gabon)

10 November 1996 1998 FIFA World Cup qualification Final Round	Gabon	1–1	Ghana	Libreville, Gabon
16:00	Nguema 65'	Report	Pele 66'	Stadium: Stade Omar Bongo; Attendance: 45,000; Referee: Ian McLeod (South Africa)

=== 1997 ===
12 January 1997 1998 FIFA World Cup qualification Final Round	Ghana	2–2	Morocco	Kumasi, Ghana
14:45	Johnson 77'; Moses 89'	Report	Bassir 30'; Hadji 70'	Stadium: Baba Yara Stadium; Attendance: 45,000; Referee: Ali Mohamed Bujsaim (UAE)

26 January 1997 1998 AFCON qualification	Zimbabwe	0–0	Ghana	National Sports Stadium, Harare
		Report		Attendance: 45,000; Referee: Jean-Fidèle Diramba (Gabon)

5 April 1997 1998 FIFA World Cup qualification Final Round	Sierra Leone	1–1	Ghana	Freetown, Sierra Leone
16:30	Conteh 87'	Report	A. Kamara 23' (o.g.)	Stadium: National Stadium; Attendance: 30,000; Referee: Lucien Bouchardeau (Niger)

27 April 1997 1998 FIFA World Cup qualification Final Round	Ghana	3–0	Gabon	Accra, Ghana
15:00	Aboagye 42'; Gargo 60', 64' (pen.)	Report		Stadium: Accra Sports Stadium; Attendance: 35,000; Referee: Ahmed Shinnawi (Egypt)

8 June 1997 1998 FIFA World Cup qualification Final Round	Morocco	1–0	Ghana	Casablanca, Morocco
20:00	Raghib 67'	Report		Stadium: Stade Mohammed V Attendance: 80,000; Referee: Sidi Magassa (Mali)

22 June 1997 1998 AFCON qualification	Angola	1–0	Ghana	Estádio da Cidadela, Luanda
	Akwá 23'	Report		Attendance: 10,000

13 July 1997 1998 AFCON qualification	Ghana	2–1	Zimbabwe	Accra Sports Stadium, Accra
	Pele 22'; Kuffour 39'	Report	Muradzikwa 24'	Attendance: 40,000; Referee: Ousseynou Dieng (Ivory Coast)

17 August 1997 1998 FIFA World Cup qualification Final Round	Ghana	0–2	Sierra Leone	Accra, Ghana
15:00		Report	Amidu 14'; Kallon 47'	Stadium: Accra Sports Stadium; Attendance: 3,000; Referee: Lazare Essimi Mbengue (Cameroon)

=== 1998 ===
14 January 1998 International friendly	Ghana	0-0	Mozambique	Ghana
		Report

19 January 1999 International friendly	Ghana	3-1	Mozambique	Ghana
		Report

9 February 1998 1998 AFCON GS	Ghana	2–0	Tunisia	Ouagadougou, Burkina Faso
20:30	Nyarko 8'; Gargo 90'	Report		Stadium: Stade du 4 Août; Attendance: 12,000; Referee: Ian McLeod (South Africa)

12 February 1998 1998 AFCON GS	Togo	2–1	Ghana	Ouagadougou, Burkina Faso
20:30	Doté 26'; Kader 90'	Report	Johnson 83' (pen.)	Stadium: Stade du 4 Août; Attendance: 3,000; Referee: Omer Yengo (Congo)

16 February 1998 1998 AFCON GS	DR Congo	1–0	Ghana	Ouagadougou, Burkina Faso
17:00	Kisombe 77'	Report		Stadium: Stade du 4 Août; Attendance: 3,000; Referee: Young-Joo Kim (South Korea)

25 July 1998 International friendly	Ghana	1-0	Benin	Burkina Faso
		Report

16 September 1998 Independence Tournament	Eswatini	0-1	Ghana	Eswatini
		Report

4 October 1998 2000 AFCON qualification	Cameroon	1–3; Annulled	Ghana	Douala, Cameroon
	Olembé 35'	Report	Akonnor 12'; Johnson 35'; Nyarko 89'	Stadium: Stade de la Réunification; Attendance: 40,000

13 October 1998 International friendly	Netherlands	0-0	Ghana	Netherlands
		Report

3 December 1998 International friendly	Mali	0-2	Ghana	Mali
		Report

=== 1999 ===
24 January 1999 2000 AFCON qualifier	Ghana	1-0; Annulled	Mozambique	Accra, Ghana
	Akonnor 54'	Report		Stadium: Accra Sports Stadium; Attendance: 30,000

28 February 1999 2000 AFCON qualifier	Ghana	5-0; Annulled	Eritrea	Accra, Ghana
	Ahinful 5'; Preko 27', 56', 84'; Ofori-Quaye 68'	Report		Stadium: Accra Sports Stadium; Attendance: 50,000

7 August 1999 Panafest Trophy	Ghana	2-1	Jamaica	Ghana
		Report

28 August 1999 International friendly	Nigeria	0–0	Ghana
		Report

12 November 1999 International friendly	Egypt	1-2	Ghana	Egypt
		Report

14 December 1999 International friendly	Greece	1-1	Ghana	Greece
		Report

22 December 1999 International friendly	Tunisia	2-0	Ghana	Tunisia
		Report
