= 1992 King Fahd Cup squads =

Below are the rosters for the 1992 King Fahd Cup tournament in Saudi Arabia.

== Teams ==
=== Argentina ===
Head coach: Alfio Basile

No.	Pos.	Player	Date of birth (age)	Caps	Club
1	GK	Sergio Goycochea	17 October 1963 (aged 28)	-	(Paraguay) Cerro Porteño
2	DF	Sergio Vázquez	23 November 1965 (aged 26)	-	(Argentina) Rosario Central
3	DF	Ricardo Altamirano	12 December 1965 (aged 26)	-	(Argentina) River Plate
4	DF	Fabián Basualdo	26 February 1964 (aged 28)	-	(Argentina) River Plate
5	MF	Fernando Redondo	6 July 1969 (aged 23)	-	(Spain) CD Tenerife
6	DF	Oscar Ruggeri (c)	26 January 1962 (aged 30)	-	(Italy) Ancona
7	FW	Claudio Caniggia	9 January 1967 (aged 25)	-	(Italy) AS Roma
8	MF	José Luis Villarreal	17 March 1966 (aged 26)	-	(Argentina) Boca Juniors
9	FW	Gabriel Batistuta	1 February 1969 (aged 23)	-	(Italy) Fiorentina
10	MF	Diego Simeone	28 April 1970 (aged 22)	-	(Spain) Sevilla
11	MF	Diego Cagna	19 April 1970 (aged 22)	-	(Argentina) Independiente
12	GK	Luis Islas	22 December 1965 (aged 26)	-	(Argentina) Independiente
14	FW	Alberto Acosta	23 August 1966 (aged 26)	-	(Argentina) San Lorenzo
15	DF	Jorge Borelli	2 November 1964 (aged 27)	-	(Argentina) Racing Club
16	FW	Claudio García	24 August 1963 (aged 29)	-	(Argentina) Racing Club
18	DF	Néstor Craviotto	6 October 1963 (aged 29)	-	(Argentina) Independiente
20	MF	Leonardo Rodríguez	24 August 1966 (aged 28)	-	(Italy) Atalanta
21	GK	Fabián Cancelarich	30 December 1965 (aged 26)	-	(Argentina) Belgrano

=== Ivory Coast ===
Head coach: Yeo Martial

No.	Pos.	Player	Date of birth (age)	Caps	Club
1	GK	Alain Gouaméné	15 June 1966 (aged 26)		(Morocco) Raja Casablanca
2	DF	Basile Aka Kouamé	6 April 1963 (aged 29)		(Ivory Coast) ASEC Mimosas
3	DF	Arsène Hobou	30 October 1967 (aged 24)		(Ivory Coast) ASEC Mimosas
4	MF	Ibrahima Koné	26 July 1969 (aged 23)		(Ivory Coast) Africa Sports
5	DF	Rufin Lué	5 January 1968 (aged 24)		(Ivory Coast) Africa Sports
6	DF	Sékana Diaby	10 August 1968 (aged 24)		(France) Stade Brestois 29
7	MF	Gadji Celi	1 May 1961 (aged 31)		(Ivory Coast) ASEC Mimosas
8	FW	Oumar Ben Salah	2 July 1964 (aged 28)		(France) Le Mans FC
10	FW	Abdoulaye Traoré	4 March 1967 (aged 25)		(Ivory Coast) ASEC Mimosas
12	FW	Georges Lignon	29 December 1968 (aged 23)		(Ivory Coast) Africa Sports
14	MF	Lucien Kassi-Kouadio	12 December 1963 (aged 28)		(Ivory Coast) ASEC Mimosas
16	GK	Losseni Konaté	29 December 1972 (aged 19)		(Ivory Coast) ASEC Mimosas
17	MF	Serge Maguy	20 October 1970 (aged 21)		(Ivory Coast) Africa Sports
18	FW	Beugré Yago	15 December 1969 (aged 22)		(Ivory Coast) Africa Sports
19	DF	Sam Abouo	26 December 1973 (aged 18)		(Ivory Coast) ASEC Mimosas
20	DF	Alain Bédé	20 August 1970 (aged 22)		(Ivory Coast) ASEC Mimosas
21	FW	Donald-Olivier Sié	3 April 1970 (aged 22)		(Ivory Coast) ASEC Mimosas
22	DF	Lassina Dao	6 February 1971 (aged 21)		(Ivory Coast) ASEC Mimosas

=== Saudi Arabia ===
Head coach: (Brazil) Nelsinho Rosa

No.	Pos.	Player	Date of birth (age)	Caps	Club
1	GK	Saud Al-Otaibi	3 November 1969 (aged 22)		(Saudi Arabia) Al-Shabab
2	DF	Abdullah Al-Dosari	1 November 1969 (aged 22)		(Saudi Arabia) Al-Ittihad
3	MF	Salem Al-Alawi	21 August 1972 (aged 20)		(Saudi Arabia) Al-Qadsiah
4	DF	Abdul Rahman Al-Roomi	28 October 1969 (aged 22)		(Saudi Arabia) Al-Shabab
5	DF	Mohammed Al-Khilaiwi	21 August 1971 (aged 21)		(Saudi Arabia) Al-Ittihad
6	MF	Fuad Anwar Amin	13 October 1972 (aged 20)		(Saudi Arabia) Al-Shabab
7	FW	Saeed Al-Owairan	19 August 1967 (aged 25)		(Saudi Arabia) Al-Shabab
8	MF	Fahad Al-Bishi	10 September 1965 (aged 27)		(Saudi Arabia) Al Nassr
9	FW	Hamzah Idris	8 October 1972 (aged 20)		(Saudi Arabia) Ohod Club
10	FW	Sami Al-Jaber	11 December 1972 (aged 19)		(Saudi Arabia) Al Hilal
11	FW	Fahad Al-Mehallel	11 November 1970 (aged 21)		(Saudi Arabia) Al-Shabab
12	DF	Awad Al-Anazi	24 September 1968 (aged 24)		(Saudi Arabia) Al-Shabab
14	MF	Khaled Al-Muwallid	23 November 1971 (aged 20)		(Saudi Arabia) Al Ahli
15	MF	Yousuf Al-Thunayan	18 November 1963 (aged 28)		(Saudi Arabia) Al Hilal
16	MF	Khaled Al-Hazaa	2 December 1971 (aged 20)		(Saudi Arabia) Al Nassr
18	DF	Saleh Al-Dawod	24 September 1968 (aged 24)		(Saudi Arabia) Al-Shabab
19	MF	Hamzah Saleh	19 April 1967 (aged 25)		(Saudi Arabia) Al Ahli
20	MF	Abdulaziz Al-Rozan	4 August 1966 (aged 26)		(Saudi Arabia) Al-Shabab
21	GK	Shaker Al-Shujaa	22 August 1972 (aged 20)		(Saudi Arabia) Al-Shabab

=== United States ===
Head coach: (Federal Republic of Yugoslavia) Bora Milutinović

No.	Pos.	Player	Date of birth (age)	Caps	Club
1	GK	Tony Meola	21 February 1969 (aged 23)		(United States) Fort Lauderdale Strikers
2	DF	Janusz Michallik	22 April 1966 (aged 26)		(United States) Gremio Lusitano
3	DF	Mike Lapper	28 August 1970 (aged 22)		(United States) Los Angeles Heat
4	MF	Bruce Murray	25 January 1966 (aged 26)		(United States) Maryland Bays
6	MF	John Harkes	8 March 1967 (aged 25)		(England) Sheffield Wednesday
7	MF	Hugo Pérez	8 November 1963 (aged 28)		(Saudi Arabia) Al-Ittihad
8	MF	Dominic Kinnear	26 June 1967 (aged 25)		(United States) San Francisco Bay Blackhawks
9	MF	Tab Ramos	21 September 1966 (aged 26)		(Spain) Real Betis
10	FW	Peter Vermes (c)	21 November 1966 (aged 25)		(Spain) UE Figueres
11	FW	Eric Wynalda	9 June 1969 (aged 23)		(Germany) 1. FC Saarbrücken
12	FW	Jean Harbor	19 September 1965 (aged 27)		(United States) Tampa Bay Rowdies
13	MF	Cobi Jones	16 June 1970 (aged 22)		(United States) UCLA Bruins
14	MF	Brian Quinn	24 May 1960 (aged 32)		(United States) San Diego Sockers
15	MF	John DeBrito	3 December 1968 (aged 23)		(United States) Tulsa Ambush
17	DF	Marcelo Balboa	8 August 1967 (aged 25)		(United States) Colorado Foxes
18	GK	Mark Dodd	14 September 1965 (aged 27)		(United States) Colorado Foxes
19	MF	Chris Henderson	11 December 1970 (aged 21)		
20	DF	Paul Caligiuri	9 March 1964 (aged 28)		(Germany) SC Freiburg
21	DF	Fernando Clavijo	23 January 1956 (aged 36)		(United States) St. Louis Storm
22	MF	Roy Wegerle	19 March 1964 (aged 28)		(England) Blackburn Rovers
