= 1992 African Cup of Nations final =

- Event: 1992 African Cup of Nations
Ivory Coast	Ghana
(Ivory Coast)	(Ghana)
0	0
- After extra time Ivory Coast won 11–10 on penalties
- Date: 26 January 1992
- Venue: Stade de l'Amitié, Dakar
- Referee: Badara Sène (Senegal)
- Attendance: 47,500

The 1992 African Cup of Nations final was a football match that took place on 26 January 1992, at the Stade de l'Amitié in Dakar, Senegal, to determine the winner of the 1992 African Cup of Nations. The Ivory Coast defeated Ghana 11–10 on penalties after a goalless draw to win their first African Cup.

The penalty shoot-out was notably the first time that every player on the field took a penalty in a major senior international final. This would be repeated when the two teams met in the 2015 final in another Ivorian victory.

Abedi Pele, who was the African Footballer of the Year and the tournament's best player, was suspended and did not play in the final for Ghana.

== Road to the final ==
Ivory Coast		Ghana	
Opponents	Results	Opponents	Results
Group stage
Algeria	3–0	Zambia	1–0
Congo	0–0	Egypt	1–0
Quarter-finals
Zambia	1–0 (a.e.t.)	Congo	2–1
Semi-finals
Cameroon	0–0 (3–1 p)	Nigeria	2–1

== Match ==
=== Details ===
26 January 1992

Ivory Coast	0–0 (a.e.t.)	Ghana
	Report
Penalties
Aka Kouamé (penalty scored); Hobou (penalty scored); Diaby (penalty scored); Traoré (penalty scored); Tiéhi (penalty missed); Gadji-Celi (penalty scored); Kouadio (penalty scored); Abouo (penalty scored); Maguy (penalty scored); Sié (penalty scored); Gouaméné (penalty scored); Aka Kouamé (penalty scored)	11–10	(penalty scored) Baffoe; (penalty scored) Lamptey; (penalty scored) Naawu; (penalty missed) Asare; (penalty scored) Yeboah; (penalty scored) Manso; (penalty scored) Armah; (penalty scored) Aborah; (penalty scored) Ampeah; (penalty scored) Polley; (penalty scored) Ansah; (penalty missed) Baffoe

Stade de l'Amitié, Dakar
Attendance: 47,500
Referee: Badara Sène (Senegal)

Ivory Coast	Ghana

GK	1	Alain Gouaméné
RB	2	Basile Aka Kouamé
CB	6	Sékana Diaby
CB	19	Sam Abouo
LB	3	Arsène Hobou	(yellow card) 102'
CM	15	Didier Otokoré		(substituted off) 53'
CM	17	Serge Maguy
CM	7	Saint-Joseph Gadji-Celi (c)
RW	21	Donald-Olivier Sié
CF	9	Joël Tiéhi	(yellow card) 40'
LW	10	Abdoulaye Traoré		(substituted off) 102'
Substitutions:
FW	13	Moussa Traoré		(substituted on) 53'
MF	14	Lucien Kassi-Kouadio		(substituted on) 102'
Manager:
Yeo Martial

GK	1	Edward Ansah
CB	14	Emmanuel Armah	(yellow card) 42'
CB	2	Anthony Baffoe (c)
CB	21	Frimpong Manso	(yellow card) 76'
RWB	19	Emmanuel Ampeah
LWB	20	Isaac Asare
CM	7	Sarfo Gyamfi		(substituted off) 51'
CM	17	Stanley Aborah
RW	15	Prince Polley
CF	9	Tony Yeboah
LW	8	Nii Lamptey
Substitutions:
FW	13	Richard Naawu		(substituted on) 51'
Manager:
(Germany) Otto Pfister

Assistant referees:
Lim Kee Chong (Mauritius)
... ()
