= 1992 African Cup of Nations =

18th edition of the Africa Cup of Nations

Coupe d'Afrique des Nations 1992

Tournament details
- Host country: Senegal
- Dates: 12–26 January
- Teams: 12
- Venues: 2 (in 2 host cities)

Final positions
- Champions: Ivory Coast (1st title)
- Runners-up: Ghana
- Third place: Nigeria
- Fourth place: Cameroon

Tournament statistics
- Matches played: 20
- Goals scored: 34 (1.7 per match)
- Attendance: 385,500 (19,275 per match)
- Top scorer: (Nigeria) Rashidi Yekini (4 goals)
- Best player: (Ghana) Abedi Pele
- Best goalkeeper: (Ivory Coast) Alain Gouaméné

The 1992 African Cup of Nations was the 18th edition of the African Cup of Nations, the international football championship run by the Confederation of African Football (CAF). It was hosted by Senegal. The field expanded to twelve teams, split into four groups of three; the top two teams in each group advanced to the quarter-finals.

The Ivory Coast won a first championship, defeating Ghana 11–10 on penalties in the final following a goalless draw.

== Qualified teams ==
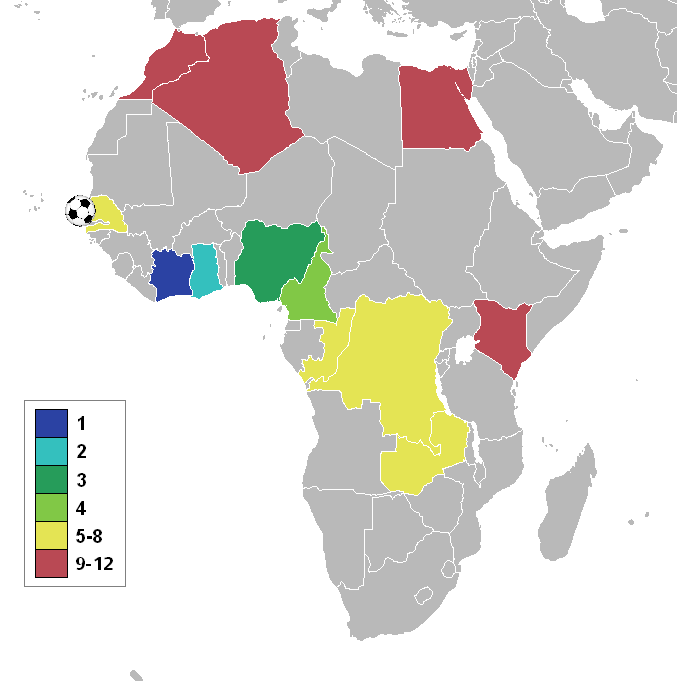
Participating nations

The 12 qualified teams are:

Team	Qualified as	Qualified on	Previous appearances in tournament (Note: Bold indicates champion for that year, Italic indicates host.)
Senegal	Hosts		4 (1965, 1968, 1986, 1990)
Algeria	Holders	16 March 1990	7 (1968, 1980, 1982, 1984, 1986, 1988, **1990**)
Cameroon	Group 1 winners	28 July 1991	7 (1970, 1972, 1982, **1984**, 1986, **1988**, 1990)
Congo	Group 7 winners	14 July 1991	4 (1968, **1972**, 1974, 1978)
Egypt	Group 2 winners	26 July 1991	12 (**1957**, **1959**, 1962, 1963, 1970, 1974, 1976, 1980, 1984, **1986**, 1988, 1990)
Ghana	Group 4 winners	28 July 1991	8 (**1963**, **1965**, 1968, 1970, **1978**, 1980, **1982**, 1984)
Ivory Coast	Group 3 winners	28 July 1991	9 (1965, 1968, 1970, 1974, 1980, 1984, 1986, 1988, 1990)
Kenya	Group 6 winners	28 July 1991	3 (1972, 1988, 1990)
Morocco	Group 3 runners-up	28 July 1991	6 (1972, **1976**, 1978, 1980, 1986, 1988)
Nigeria	Group 4 runners-up	28 July 1991	8 (1963, 1976, 1978, **1980**, 1982, 1984, 1988, 1990)
Zaire	Group 8 winners	28 July 1991	7 (1965, **1968**, 1970, 1972, **1974**, 1976, 1988)
Zambia	Group 5 winners	28 July 1991	5 (1974, 1978, 1982, 1986, 1990)

== Venues ==
The competition was played in two venues in Dakar and Ziguinchor.

Dakar	1992 African Cup of Nations is located in Senegal
Stade de l'Amitié	1992 African Cup of Nations is located in Senegal
Capacity: 60,000	1992 African Cup of Nations is located in Senegal
Ziguinchor	1992 African Cup of Nations is located in Senegal
Stade Aline Sitoe Diatta	1992 African Cup of Nations is located in Senegal
Capacity: 10,000	1992 African Cup of Nations is located in Senegal

== Group stage ==
=== Tiebreakers ===
If two or more teams finished level on points after completion of the group matches, the following tie-breakers were used to determine the final ranking:

1. Greatest total goal difference in the three group matches
2. Greatest number of goals scored in the three group matches
3. Most points earned in matches against other teams in the tie
4. Greatest goal difference in matches against other teams in the tie
5. Greatest number of goals scored in matches against other teams in the tie
6. Drawing of lots

=== Group A ===
Pos	Team	Pld	W	D	L	GF	GA	GD	Pts	Qualification
1	Nigeria	2	2	0	0	4	2	+2	4	Advance to Knockout stage
2	Senegal (H)	2	1	0	1	4	2	+2	2	Advance to Knockout stage
3	Kenya	2	0	0	2	1	5	−4	0	

Rules for classification: Group stage tiebreakers
(H) Hosts
12 January 1992

Nigeria	2–1	Senegal
Siasia 13'; Keshi 89'		Bocandé 36'

Stade de l'Amitié, Dakar
Attendance: 60,000
Referee: Nizar Watti (Syria)

14 January 1992

Nigeria	2–1	Kenya
Yekini 7', 15'		Weche 89' (pen.)

Stade de l'Amitié, Dakar
Attendance: 5,000
Referee: Kadry Abdelazim (Egypt)

16 January 1992

Senegal	3–0	Kenya
Sané 46'; Bocandé 68'; Diagne 89'

Stade de l'Amitié, Dakar
Attendance: 50,000
Referee: Omer Yengo (Congo)

=== Group B ===
Pos	Team	Pld	W	D	L	GF	GA	GD	Pts	Qualification
1	Cameroon	2	1	1	0	2	1	+1	3	Advance to Knockout stage
2	Zaire	2	0	2	0	2	2	0	2	Advance to Knockout stage
3	Morocco	2	0	1	1	1	2	−1	1	

Rules for classification: Group stage tiebreakers
12 January 1992

Cameroon	1–0	Morocco
Kana-Biyik 23'

Stade de l'Amitié, Dakar
Attendance: 60,000

14 January 1992

Morocco	1–1	Zaire
Rokbi 89'		Kona 90'

Stade de l'Amitié, Dakar
Attendance: 5,000

16 January 1992

Cameroon	1–1	Zaire
Omam-Biyik 15'		Tueba 1'

Stade de l'Amitié, Dakar
Attendance: 10,000

=== Group C ===
Pos	Team	Pld	W	D	L	GF	GA	GD	Pts	Qualification
1	Ivory Coast	2	1	1	0	3	0	+3	3	Advance to Knockout stage
2	Congo	2	0	2	0	1	1	0	2	Advance to Knockout stage
3	Algeria	2	0	1	1	1	4	−3	1	

Rules for classification: Group stage tiebreakers
13 January 1992

Ivory Coast	3–0	Algeria
A. Traoré 14'; Fofana 25'; Tiéhi 89'	Report

Stade Aline Sitoe Diatta, Ziguinchor
Attendance: 5,000
Referee: Mohamed Hounnake-Kouassi (Togo)

15 January 1992

Ivory Coast	0–0	Congo

Stade Aline Sitoe Diatta, Ziguinchor
Attendance: 5,000
Referee: Rafhidi Ali (Tanzania)

17 January 1992

Algeria	1–1	Congo
Bouiche 44'	Report	Tchibota 6'

Stade Aline Sitoe Diatta, Ziguinchor
Attendance: 5,000
Referee: Christopher Musaabi (Uganda)

=== Group D ===
Pos	Team	Pld	W	D	L	GF	GA	GD	Pts	Qualification
1	Ghana	2	2	0	0	2	0	+2	4	Advance to Knockout stage
2	Zambia	2	1	0	1	1	1	0	2	Advance to Knockout stage
3	Egypt	2	0	0	2	0	2	−2	0	

Rules for classification: Group stage tiebreakers
13 January 1992

Zambia	1–0	Egypt
Kalusha 61'

Stade Aline Sitoe Diatta, Ziguinchor
Attendance: 5,000

15 January 1992

Ghana	1–0	Zambia
Pele 64'

Stade Aline Sitoe Diatta, Ziguinchor
Attendance: 5,000

17 January 1992

Ghana	1–0	Egypt
Yeboah 89'

Stade Aline Sitoe Diatta, Ziguinchor
Attendance: 5,000

== Knockout stage ==
=== Bracket ===
Quarter-finals
19 January – Dakar
Nigeria	1
Zaire	0
20 January – Dakar
Ghana	2
Congo	1
19 January – Dakar
Cameroon	1
Senegal	0
20 January – Dakar
Ivory Coast (a.e.t.)	1
Zambia	0

Semi-finals
23 January – Dakar
Nigeria	1
Ghana	2
23 January – Dakar
Cameroon	0 (1)
Ivory Coast (p)	0 (3)

Final
26 January – Dakar
Ghana	0 (10)
Ivory Coast (p)	0 (11)
Third place
25 January – Dakar
Nigeria	2
Cameroon	1

=== Quarter-finals ===
19 January 1992

Nigeria	1–0	Zaire
Yekini 22'

Stade de l'Amitié, Dakar
Attendance: 10,000
Referee: Idrissa Sarr (Mauritania)

19 January 1992

Cameroon	1–0	Senegal
Ebongué 89'

Stade de l'Amitié, Dakar
Attendance: 35,000
Referee: Kiichiro Tachi (Japan)

20 January 1992

Ivory Coast	1–0 (a.e.t.)	Zambia
Sié 94'

Stade de l'Amitié, Dakar
Attendance: 3,000
Referee: Pierre Mounguegui (Gabon)

20 January 1992

Ghana	2–1	Congo
Yeboah 29'; Pele 57'		Tchibota 52'

Stade de l'Amitié, Dakar
Attendance: 7,500
Referee: Ibrahim Faye (Gambia)

=== Semi-finals ===
23 January 1992

Ghana	2–1	Nigeria
Pele 43'; Polley 54'	Report	Adepoju 11'

Stade de l'Amitié, Dakar
Attendance: 25,000
Referee: Neji Jouini (Tunisia)

23 January 1992

Cameroon	0–0 (a.e.t.)	Ivory Coast
	Report
Penalties
Makanaky (penalty missed); Ebwelle (penalty scored); Omam-Biyik (penalty missed); Bell (penalty missed)	1–3	(penalty scored) Diaby; (penalty scored) M. Traoré; (penalty missed) Yago; (penalty scored) A. Traoré

Stade de l'Amitié, Dakar
Attendance: 35,000
Referee: Lim Kee Chong (Mauritius)

=== Third place match ===
25 January 1992

Nigeria	2–1	Cameroon
Ekpo 75'; Yekini 88'		Maboang 85'

Stade de l'Amitié, Dakar
Attendance: 2,500
Referee: Sinko Zeli (Ivory Coast)

=== Final ===
26 January 1992

Ivory Coast	0–0 (a.e.t.)	Ghana
	Report
Penalties
Aka Kouamé (penalty scored); Hobou (penalty scored); Diaby (penalty scored); Traoré (penalty scored); Tiéhi (penalty missed); Gadji-Celi (penalty scored); Kouadio (penalty scored); Abouo (penalty scored); Maguy (penalty scored); Sié (penalty scored); Gouaméné (penalty scored); Aka Kouamé (penalty scored)	11–10	(penalty scored) Baffoe; (penalty scored) Lamptey; (penalty scored) Naawu; (penalty missed) Asare; (penalty scored) Yeboah; (penalty scored) Manso; (penalty scored) Armah; (penalty scored) Aborah; (penalty scored) Ampeah; (penalty scored) Polley; (penalty scored) Ansah; (penalty missed) Baffoe

Stade de l'Amitié, Dakar
Attendance: 47,500
Referee: Badara Sène (Senegal)

The penalty shoot-out was significant in that it was the first time in the final of a major senior international tournament that every player on the pitch took a penalty.

== Goalscorers ==
There were 34 goals scored in 20 matches, for an average of 1.7 goals per match.

4 goals

- (Nigeria) Rashidi Yekini

3 goals

- (Ghana) Abedi Pele

2 goals

- (Republic of the Congo) Pierre Tchibota
- (Ghana) Tony Yeboah
- (Senegal) Jules Bocandé

1 goal

- (Algeria) Nacer Bouiche
- (Cameroon) Érnest Ebongué
- (Cameroon) André Kana-Biyik
- (Cameroon) François Omam-Biyik
- (Cameroon) Emmanuel Maboang
- (Ghana) Prince Polley
- (Ivory Coast) Youssouf Fofana
- (Ivory Coast) Donald Olivier Sié
- (Ivory Coast) Joël Tiehi
- (Ivory Coast) Abdoulaye Traoré
- (Kenya) Micky Weche
- (Morocco) Said Rokbi
- (Nigeria) Mutiu Adepoju
- (Nigeria) Friday Ekpo
- (Nigeria) Stephen Keshi
- (Nigeria) Samson Siasia
- (Senegal) Victor Diagne
- (Senegal) Souleymane Sané
- (Zaire) Andre Kona N'Gole
- (Zaire) Tueba Menayane
- (Zambia) Kalusha Bwalya

== Team of the Tournament ==
Goalkeeper

- (Ivory Coast) Alain Gouaméné

Defenders

- (Ivory Coast) Basile Aka Kouame
- (Egypt) Hany Ramzy
- (Nigeria) Stephen Keshi
- (Senegal) Adolphe Mendy

Midfielders

- (Zaire) Jacques Kinkomba Kingambo
- (Ghana) Abedi Pele
- (Cameroon) Jean-Claude Pagal
- (Ivory Coast) Serge-Alain Maguy

Forwards

- (Nigeria) Rashidi Yekini
- (Ghana) Tony Yeboah
