= Badara Sène (referee) =

Senegalese football referee (1945–2020)

- Full name: Badara Mamaya Sène
- Born: March 5, 1945
- Died: June 22, 2020 (aged 75); Rufisque, Senegal

International
| Years | League | Role |
| 1984–1992 | FIFA listed | Referee |

Badara Mamaya Sène (5 March 1945 – 22 June 2020 in Rufisque) was a Senegalese football referee best known for officiating the 1992 African Cup of Nations final between Ivory Coast & Ghana.

He was a referee during three Africa Cup of Nations final tournaments (1988, 1990, 1992).

He also took charge of two Olympic matches, one at the 1988 Olympic Games (China vs Sweden), and the other at the 1992 AFC Asian Cup (Qatar vs China).

After retirement from football he served as the mayor of Rufisque between 2009 and 2014.

He died in 2020.

== Extrernal links ==
Profile at WorldFootball.net
