= Pierre Tchibota =

Congolese footballer

Personal information
- Date of birth: 5 December 1968 (age 57)

International career
Years	Team	Apps	(Gls)
1991–1997	Congo	12	(3)

Pierre Tchibota (born 5 December 1968) is a Congolese footballer. He played in twelve matches for the Congo national football team from 1991 to 1997.He was also named in Congo's squad for the 1992 African Cup of Nations tournament.

== Career statistics ==
=== International ===
Appearances and goals by national team and year
National team	Year	Apps	Goals
Congo	1991	1	0
Congo	1992	5	3
Congo	1993	2	0
Congo	1996	1	0
Congo	1997	3	0
Total		12	3

Scores and results list Congo's goal tally first, score column indicates score after each Tchibota goal.

List of international goals scored by Pierre Tchibota
No.	Date	Venue	Opponent	Score	Result	Competition	Ref.
1	17 January 1992	Stade Aline Sitoe Diatta, Ziguinchor, Senegal	Algeria	1–0	1–1	1992 African Cup of Nations	
2	20 January 1992	Stade de l'Amitié, Dakar, Senegal	Ghana	1–1	1–2	1992 African Cup of Nations	
3	30 August 1992	Stade Alphonse Massemba-Débat, Brazzaville, Republic of the Congo	Chad	1–0	2–0	1994 Africa Cup of Nations qualification	
