= Mickey Weche =

Kenyan Footballer

Mickey Weche, born Francis Makuku, is a retired Kenyan footballer who was capped 43 times for Kenya between 1985 and 1992, scoring four goals. Weche, best known as 'T9', played as defender for club sides Reli FC, AFC Leopards, and for Kenya.

== Career ==
Weche featured at the 1988 Africa Cup of Nations, 1990 Africa Cup of Nations as well as 1992 Africa Cup of Nations where he scored an 89th-minute penalty at the group stage in Kenya's 2–1 loss to Nigeria at the de l'Amitié Stadium in Dakar, Senegal, on 14 January 1992.

He served as an assistant coach at AFC Leopards in 2011 and standing coach in 2012, as an assistant for the Kenya senior team at the 2004 Africa Cup of Nations, and as head coach of Varsity side Strathmore.
