= Georges Lignon =

Ivorian footballer

Personal information
- Full name: Georges Lignon Nagueu
- Date of birth: 29 December 1968 (age 57)
- Position: Defender

International career
Years	Team	Apps	(Gls)
1987–1993	Ivory Coast	19	(0)

Georges Lignon Nagueu (born 29 December 1968) is an Ivorian footballer. He played in 19 matches for the Ivory Coast national football team from 1987 to 1993. He was also named in Ivory Coast's squad for the 1990 African Cup of Nations tournament.
