= Rufin Lué =

Ivorian footballer

Personal information
- Date of birth: 5 January 1968 (age 58)
- Position: Defender

Senior career*
| Years | Team | Apps | (Gls) |
| 1987-2000 | Africa Sports National | | |

International career
| 1987–1997 | Ivory Coast | 31 | (0) |
- * Club domestic league appearances and goals

Rufin Lué (born 5 January 1968) is an Ivorian footballer. He played in 31 matches for the Ivory Coast national football team from 1987 to 1997. He was also named in the Ivory Coast's squad for the 1988 African Cup of Nations tournament.
