= Oumar Ben Salah =

Ivorian footballer

Personal information
- Full name: Oumar Ben Salah
- Date of birth: 2 July 1964 (age 62)
- Place of birth: Abidjan, Ivory Coast
- Height: 1.78 m (5 ft 10 in)
- Position: Midfielder

Senior career*
Years	Team	Apps	(Gls)
1983–1986	Stade d'Abidjan	-	(-)
1986–1989	Sète 34	49	(9)
1989–1991	Avignon Foot 84	58	(8)
1991–1994	Le Mans	58	(17)

International career
1987–1993	Ivory Coast	21	(4)
- * Club domestic league appearances and goals

Oumar Ben Salah (born 2 July 1964) is a former Ivorian international footballer who played as a midfielder.

== Honours ==
=== Clubs ===
- Côte d'Ivoire Cup: 1984
- Coupe Houphouët-Boigny: 1985

=== International ===
- Africa Cup of Nations: 1992
- FIFA Confederations Cup participation: 1992 (4th place)
