= Eugène Beugré Yago =

Ivorian footballer (born 1969)

Personal information
- Date of birth: 15 December 1969 (age 56)
- Position: Midfielder

Senior career*
Years	Team	Apps	(Gls)
1988–1989	AS Sotra		
1990–1994	Africa Sports d'Abidjan		
1994–1999	Al-Arabi SC		

International career
1989–1994	Ivory Coast	12	(0)
- * Club domestic league appearances and goals

Eugène Beugré Yago (born 15 December 1969) is an Ivorian former professional footballer played as a midfielder. He made 12 appearances for the Ivory Coast national team from 1989 to 1994. He was also named in Ivory Coast's squad for the 1994 African Cup of Nations tournament.
