= Emmanuel Ampeah =

Ghanaian footballer

Personal information
- Date of birth: 22 April 1968 (age 58)
- Position: Defender

Senior career*
| Years | Team | Apps | (Gls) |
| c. 1991 – 1999 | Asante Kotoko | | |
| 2000–2002 | King Faisal Babes | | |
| 2003 | Berekum Arsenal | | |

International career
- Ghana
- * Club domestic league appearances and goals

Emmanuel Ampeah (born 22 April 1968) is a retired Ghanaian football defender. He was a squad member at the 1992 and 1994 Africa Cup of Nations, including the 1992 Africa Cup of Nations Final, scoring his penalty in the lengthy penalty shootout.
