= Sam Abouo =

Ivorian footballer (born 1973)

Personal information
- Full name: Dominique Sam Abouo
- Date of birth: 26 December 1973 (age 52)
- Place of birth: Attécoubé, Ivory Coast
- Height: 1.81 m (5 ft 11 in)
- Position: Defender

Youth career
- –1991: Mimosas U19

Senior career*
Years	Team	Apps	(Gls)
1991–1993	ASEC Mimosas		
1993–1994	Monaco		
1994–1998	Al-Nassr FC		
1998–2000	Lokeren	13	(0)
2000–2001	Siirt Jetpa	13	(0)
2001	Beşiktaş		
2001–2002	Geel	11	(2)
2002	Racing Mol-Wezel		

International career
1992–2000	Ivory Coast	21	(0)
- * Club domestic league appearances and goals

Dominique Sam Abouo (born 26 December 1973) is an Ivorian former professional footballer who played as a defender. He was a member of the Ivory Coast squad for the 1992, 1994, and 2000 Africa Cup of Nations.
