= Saint-Joseph Gadji-Celi =

Ivorian footballer

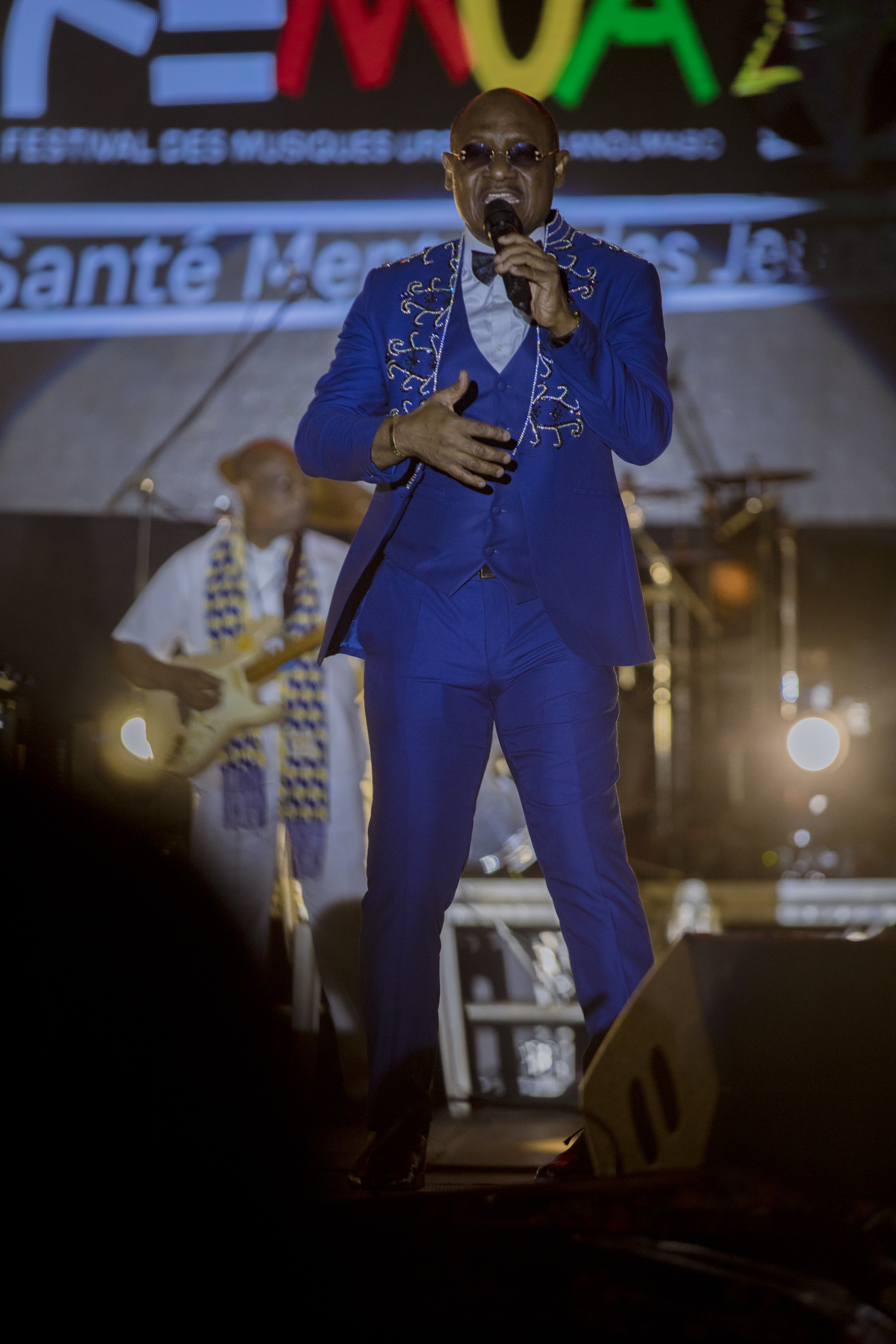

Personal information
- Date of birth: 1 May 1961 (age 65)
- Place of birth: Abidjan, Ivory Coast
- Height: 1.76 m (5 ft 9 in)
- Position: Midfielder

Senior career*
Years	Team	Apps	(Gls)
1980–1982	Stella Club d'Adjamé		
1983–1986	ASEC Mimosas		
1986–1989	FC Sète 34	46	(1)
1989–1992	ASEC Mimosas		

International career
1984–1992	Ivory Coast		
- * Club domestic league appearances and goals

Saint-Joseph Gadji-Celi (born 1 May 1961) is an Ivorian former professional footballer who played as a midfielder.

== Career ==
Born in Abidjan, Gadji-Celi played for Stella Club d'Adjamé, ASEC Mimosas and FC Sète 34.

He was a member of the Ivory Coast national team between 1984 and 1992, serving as captain of the national team, including at the 1992 African Cup of Nations, which Ivory Coast won.

== Personal life ==
His nephew is fellow footballer Junior Tallo.
