= Stade Aline Sitoe Diatta =

Football stadium in Ziguinchor, Senegal

- Location within Senegal
- Location: Ziguinchor, Senegal
- Coordinates: 12.58°N 16.2588°W
- Owner: City of Ziguinchor
- Capacity: 10,000
- Surface: Artificial turf

Construction
- Opened: 1992

Tenant
- Casa Sports

Stade Aline Sitoe Diatta is a multi-use stadium in Ziguinchor, Senegal. It was named after Aline Sitoe Diatta, a Diola woman regarded by many as the only woman who stood against the colonialist push into Casamance. It is currently used mostly for football matches and serves as a home ground of Casa Sport. The stadium holds 10,000 people, and was built to host the 1992 African Cup of Nations.

Located in the northern part of the city of Ziguinchor, it has been plagued by its poor pitch, because the stadium was built on what used to be a rice field, rendering it unusable during the rainy season. However, recent efforts by local authorities to change the pitch into a synthetic turf were successful.

During the group stage times, the first leg of the 2009 Ligue 1 finals took place with its first match at the stadium, the club ended in a scoreless draw with ASC Linguère.

The first continental competition featuring Casa Sport was held at the stadium was the African Cup of Champions Clubs in 1980. The only continental cup competition held was in 2012 with a match. The second and last continental championship was the 2013 CAF Champions League with two matches.

The 25th year of the completion of the stadium will be celebrated.

== See also ==
- List of football stadiums in Senegal
