= Emmanuel Armah =

Ghanaian footballer

Personal information
- Date of birth: April 22, 1968 (age 58)
- Place of birth: Ghana
- Position: Defender

Senior career*
Years	Team	Apps	(Gls)
1991–1994	Hearts of Oak		
1994–1995	Sportul Studențesc București		
1995–1999	Hearts of Oak		

International career
1990–1997	Ghana	17	(1)
- * Club domestic league appearances and goals

Emmanuel Armah (born 22 April 1968) is a retired Ghanaian football defender.

He played for Hearts of Oak in Ghana, except for the 1994–95 season at Sportul Studențesc București in Romania. He was also capped for Ghana, and was a squad member in the 1992 African Cup of Nations and the 1997 Korea Cup.

== Honours ==
Hearts of Oak

- Ghanaian League Champions:1996–97, 1997–98, 1999
- Ghanaian FA Cup: 1993–94, 1995–96, 1999
- Ghana Super Cup: 1997, 1998

Ghana

- African Cup of Nations runner-up: 1992
