= Edward Ansah =

Ghanaian footballer

Personal information
- Date of birth: 1 February 1963 (age 63)

International career
Years	Team	Apps	(Gls)
1992–2003	Ghana	15	(0)

Edward Ansah (born 1 February 1963) is a Ghanaian footballer. He played in 15 matches for the Ghana national football team from 1992 to 2003. He was also named in Ghana's squad for the 1992 African Cup of Nations tournament.

== Managerial career ==
In May 2019, Indian I-League side Churchill Brothers appointed Ansah as their new head coach for the upcoming season. Churchill Brothers moved to appoint their former goalkeeper and ex-Ghanaian international Edward Ansah as the head coach for the upcoming season. Edward also played for the club during their National Football League (India) seasons, and was a vital part of the Goan team between 1999 and 2004. He also retired with the club. he played football in Nigeria and was in goal for the then Nigerian first division team known as Iwuanyanwu Nationals Football club (INFC) based in Owerri, the capital city of Imo state, Nigeria. He played club champions finals between INFC and Algerian club. INFC lost that game because the match was played by 23.00hrs. It was after that match the Confederation of African Football, CAF, made a rule that henceforth, none of its matches will start before 14.00hrs and be over by 23.00hrs.
