= Prince Polley =

Ghanaian footballer (born 1969)

Personal information
- Full name: Prince Opoku Bismark Polley Sampene
- Date of birth: 4 May 1969 (age 57)
- Place of birth: Accra, Ghana
- Position: Striker

Senior career*
Years	Team	Apps	(Gls)
1984–1988	Asante Kotoko	142	(22)
1988–1990	Sparta	30	(16)
1990–1991	Beerschot	28	(7)
1991–1992	Germinal Ekeren	20	(7)
1992–1994	Twente	54	(20)
1994–1995	Heerenveen	19	(2)
1995–1997	Excelsior	24	(4)
1997–1998	VV Heerjansdam		
1998–1999	Aarau	9	(4)
Total		326	(82)

International career
1992–1994	Ghana	13	(6)
- * Club domestic league appearances and goals

Prince Opoku Bismark Polley Sampene (born 5 April 1969), known as Prince Polley, is a Ghanaian retired professional footballer who played as a striker.

== Club career ==
Polley played for Dutch club FC Twente.

== International career ==
Polley participated for Ghana in the 1992 and 1994 African Cup of Nations. Together with Abedi Pele and Tony Yeboah, he comprised the Black Stars' forward line and scored a combined brace in the 1992 and 1994 competitions. His goals included a crucial match winner against Nigeria in the semi-finals of the 1992 cup, and an 87th minute match winner against Senegal in the group stages, in the subsequent cup.

== Personal life ==
After his playing career, Polley returned to Ghana. He has a son, Robin, who is also a professional footballer.

== Career statistics ==
=== International ===
Appearances and goals by national team and year
National team	Year	Apps	Goals
Ghana	1990	2	1
Ghana	1991	3	2
Ghana	1992	2	1
Ghana	1993	2	1
Ghana	1994	2	1
Ghana	1995	2	0
Total		13	6

Scores and results list Ghana's goal tally first, score column indicates score after each Polley goal.

List of international goals scored by Prince Polley
No.	Date	Venue	Opponent	Score	Result	Competition	Ref.
1	14 October 1990	Accra Sports Stadium, Accra, Ghana	Burkina Faso	2–0	2–0	1992 Africa Cup of Nations qualification	
2	13 January 1991	Accra Sports Stadium, Accra, Ghana	Benin	1–0	4–0	1992 Africa Cup of Nations qualification	
3	13 January 1991	Accra Sports Stadium, Accra, Ghana	Benin	3–0	4–0	1992 Africa Cup of Nations qualification	
4	23 January 1992	Stade de l'Amitié, Dakar, Senegal	Nigeria	2–1	2–1	1992 Africa Cup of Nations	
5	14 April 1993	Ruhrstadion, Bochum, Germany	Germany	1–0	1–6	Friendly	
6	31 March 1994	Sousse Olympic Stadium, Sousse, Tunisia	Senegal	1–0	1–0	1994 Africa Cup of Nations	
