= Sékana Diaby =

Ivorian footballer (born 1968)

Personal information
- Full name: Dialey Sékana Diaby
- Date of birth: 10 August 1968 (age 58)
- Place of birth: Daloa, Ivory Coast
- Height: 1.78 m (5 ft 10 in)
- Position: Defender

Senior career*
Years	Team	Apps	(Gls)
1986–1988	RCF Paris	18	(0)
1988–1989	Laval	36	(4)
1989–1990	RCF Paris	6	(0)
1990–1992	Brest	34	(0)
1992–1994	Louhans-Cuiseaux	49	(1)
1994–1995	Pau	15	(0)
1995–1996	Châteauroux	10	(0)
1996	Pau	0	(0)
1996–1997	Zeytinburnuspor	17	(0)
Total		185	(5)

International career
1987–1997	Ivory Coast	25	(0)
- * Club domestic league appearances and goals

Sékana Diaby (born 10 August 1968) is an Ivorian former professional footballer who played as a defender.

He won the 1992 African Cup of Nations with the Ivory Coast.

== Career statistics ==
=== International ===
Appearances and goals by national team and year
National team	Year	Apps	Goals
Ivory Coast	1987	2	0
Ivory Coast	1988	3	0
Ivory Coast	1989	4	0
Ivory Coast	1990	3	0
Ivory Coast	1991	–	
Ivory Coast	1992	9	0
Ivory Coast	1993	2	0
Ivory Coast	1994	1	0
Ivory Coast	1995	–	
Ivory Coast	1996	–	
Ivory Coast	1997	1	0
Total		25	0
