= Saud Al-Otaibi =

Saudi Arabian footballer

Saud Al-Sammar
Personal information
- Full name: Saud Sammar Al-Otaibi
- Date of birth: 3 November 1969 (age 56)
- Place of birth: Saudi Arabia
- Position: Goalkeeper

Youth career
- Afif

Senior career*
Years	Team	Apps	(Gls)
1986-1996	Al Shabab	156	(0)
1996-1999	Al Ittihad		

International career
1989	Saudi Arabia under-20	2	(0)
1992	Saudi Arabia	2	(0)
- * Club domestic league appearances and goals

Saud Sammar Al-Otaibi is a former Saudi Arabian football goalkeeper who played for Saudi Arabia in the 1992 Asian Cup. He also played for Al Shabab.
