= Richard Naawu =

Ghanaian footballer

Personal information
- Date of birth: 5 February 1971 (age 55)
- Place of birth: Accra
- Position: Forward

Senior career*
Years	Team	Apps	(Gls)
–1989	Hearts of Oak		
1990	SC Viktoria 04 Köln		
1991–1993	SV Waldhof Mannheim		
1993–1994	Wuppertaler SV		
1994–1996	SK Vorwärts Steyr		

International career
1992	Ghana	1	(0)
- * Club domestic league appearances and goals

Richard Naawu (born 5 February 1971) is a retired Ghanaian football striker. He played the 1992 Africa Cup of Nations Final, scoring his penalty in the lengthy penalty shootout.
