= Khaled Al-Hazaa =

Saudi Arabian footballer

Personal information
- Date of birth: 2 December 1971 (age 54)
- Place of birth: Saudi Arabia
- Position: Midfielder

Senior career*
Years	Team	Apps	(Gls)
1988-2006	Al Nasr	437	(57)

International career
1989	Saudi Arabia under-20	3	(0)
1992–1993	Saudi Arabia	6	(0)
- * Club domestic league appearances and goals

Khaled Al-Hazaa is a Saudi football midfielder who played for Saudi Arabia in the 1992 Asian Cup. He also played for Al Nassr.
