= Stanley Aborah (footballer, born 1969) =

Ghanaian footballer

Personal information
- Full name: Stanley Aborah
- Date of birth: 25 August 1969 (age 57)
- Place of birth: Ghana
- Height: 1.65 m (5 ft 5 in)
- Position: Midfielder

Senior career*
Years	Team	Apps	(Gls)
1987–1991	Asante Kotoko	–	(–)
1992–1996	Cappellen	–	(–)
1997–1999	Cheoan Ilhwa Chunma	15	(0)
1999–2000	Uerdingen 05	3	(0)
2000–2001	Cappellen	40	(0)
2001–2003	De Volksvriend	–	(–)

International career
1992–1997	Ghana	11	(0)
- * Club domestic league appearances and goals

Stanley Aborah (born 25 August 1969) is a retired Ghanaian footballer who played as a midfielder.

Aborah began his career with Asante Kotoko in 1987. He moved to Belgium in 1992 to play for Cappellen, spending four years with the club, before joining South Korean club Seongnam FC then known as Cheonan Ilhwa Chunma. He returned to Europe in 1999, playing in Germany for one season with Uerdingen 05 and one further season with Cappellen, before finishing his career with Volksvriend. Aborah was a member of the Ghana national team that finished second at the 1992 African Nations Cup in Senegal and was capped 11 times for his country in total. His son, also called Stanley, has played professional football for a number of clubs in Europe, including Dutch side Ajax.
