= Yeo Martial =

Ivorian football manager (born 1944)

Personal information
- Full name: Yeo Martial
- Date of birth: 2 January 1944 (age 82)
- Place of birth: Abidjan, Ivory Coast

Managerial career
- Years: Team
- 1988: Ivory Coast
- 1992: Ivory Coast
- 1999–2001: Africa Sports
- 2002–2003: Niger
Medal record
Men's football
Representing Ivory Coast (as manager)
Africa Cup of Nations
Winner	1992

Yeo Martial (born 2 January 1944) is an Ivorian football manager.

== Career ==
He managed the Ivory Coast national team to the 1992 African Cup of Nations, and after a stint managing Africa Sports and the Niger national team, he returned to Ivory Coast set up as Technical Director in 2004.

Martial also runs his own football academy, the École de Football Yéo Martial, in Abidjan, established in 2001, which has an informal partnership with Italian side Parma.
