= Basile Aka Kouamé =

Ivorian footballer

Personal information
- Full name: Basile Aka Kouamé
- Date of birth: 6 April 1963 (age 63)
- Place of birth: Abidjan, Ivory Coast
- Position: Defender

Senior career*
Years	Team	Apps	(Gls)
1983–1997	ASEC Mimosas		

International career
1987–1996	Ivory Coast	45	(0)
Medal record
Men's football
Representing Ivory Coast
Africa Cup of Nations
Winner	1992 Senegal
Third place	1994 Tunisia
FIFA Confederations Cup
Third place	1992 Saudi Arabia
- * Club domestic league appearances and goals

Basile Aka Kouamé (born 6 April 1963) is an Ivorian former professional footballer who played as a defender. He earned 45 caps with the Ivory Coast national team.

== Club career ==
Aka Kouamé spent his entire career playing for local club ASEC Mimosas.

== International career ==
Aka Kouamé played for Ivory Coast at the 1992 Africa Cup of Nations finals, helping the team win its first continental championship. He also played for Ivory Coast in the 1992 King Fahd Cup and 1994 and 1996 African Cup of Nations finals.

== Managerial career ==
After his playing career ended, Aka Kouamé became a manager, leading LYS Sassandra, AS Nianan and Sabé Sports de Bouna before taking the helm at ASEC Mimosas. At ASEC, he won the national league and national cup.

He would later manage Rail Club du Kadiogo, Stella Club d'Adjamé and AS Indenié Abengourou.
