= Arsène Hobou =

Ivorian footballer

Personal information
- Date of birth: 30 October 1967 (age 58)

International career
Years	Team	Apps	(Gls)
1987–1996	Ivory Coast	37	(1)

Arsène Hobou (born 30 October 1967) is an Ivorian former footballer. He played in 37 matches for the Ivory Coast national football team from 1987 to 1996. He was also named in the Ivory Coast's squad for the 1988 African Cup of Nations tournament.
