= Serge Maguy =

Ivorian footballer

Personal information
- Full name: Serge-Alain Maguy
- Date of birth: 20 October 1970 (age 56)
- Place of birth: Abidjan, Ivory Coast
- Height: 1.70 m (5 ft 7 in)
- Position: Centre midfielder

Senior career*
| Years | Team | Apps | (Gls) |
| 1990–1993 | Africa Sports | | |
| 1993–1994 | Atlético Madrid | 8 | (0) |
| 1995 | ASEC | | |
| 1996 | Al-Qadsiah FC | | |
| 1996–1997 | Satellite FC | | |
| 1999–2005 | CS Chênois | | |

International career
| 1987–1997 | Ivory Coast | 32 | (2) |
- * Club domestic league appearances and goals

Serge-Alain Maguy (born 20 October 1970) is an Ivorian former footballer who played for Africa Sports, Atlético Madrid, ASEC, Satellite FC, CS Chênois, as well as the Ivorian national side.
