= Lucien Kassi-Kouadio =

Ivorian footballer (1963–2024)

Personal information
- Date of birth: 5 May 1963
- Date of death: 4 December 2024 (aged 61)
- Place of death: Abidjan, Ivory Coast
- Position: Midfielder

Senior career*
Years	Team	Apps	(Gls)
1982–1984	Stade d'Abidjan		
1985–1986	Cannes	4	(0)
1986–1987	FC Montceau	2	(0)
1987–1993	ASEC Mimosas		
1994–1995	Africa Sports d'Abidjan		

International career
1983–1992	Ivory Coast	18	(1)
- * Club domestic league appearances and goals

Lucien Kassi-Kouadio (5 May 1963 – 4 December 2024) was an Ivorian professional footballer who played as a midfielder. He made nine appearances for the Ivory Coast national team from 1983 to 1992. He was also named in Ivory Coast's squad for the 1990 African Cup of Nations tournament. Kassi-Kouadio died in Abidjan on 4 December 2024, at the age of 61.
