= Ivory Coast national football team =

Men's association football team

Ivory Coast
- Nickname: Les Éléphants (The Elephants)
- Association: Fédération Ivorienne de Football (FIF)
- Confederation: CAF (Africa)
- Sub-confederation: WAFU (West Africa)
- Head coach: Hervé Renard
- Captain: Franck Kessié
- Most caps: Didier Zokora (123)
- Top scorer: Didier Drogba (65)
- Home stadium: Alassane Ouattara Stadium
- FIFA code: CIV
| First colours | Second colours |

FIFA ranking
- Current: 28 ▲1 (18 November 2026)
- Highest: 12 (February 2013, April–May 2013)
- Lowest: 75 (March–May 2004)

First international
- Ivory Coast 3–2 Dahomey (Madagascar, 13 April 1960)

Biggest win
- Ivory Coast 11–0 Central African Republic (Abidjan, Ivory Coast; 27 December 1961)

Biggest defeat
- Netherlands 5–0 Ivory Coast (Rotterdam, Netherlands; 4 June 2017)

World Cup
- Appearances: 4 (first in 2006)
- Best result: Round of 32 (2026)

Africa Cup of Nations
- Appearances: 26 (first in 1965)
- Best result: Champions (1992, 2015, 2023)

African Nations Championship
- Appearances: 5 (first in 2009)
- Best result: Third place (2016)

Confederations Cup
- Appearances: 1 (first in 1992)
- Best result: Fourth place (1992)
- Website: fifciv.com

The Ivory Coast national football team (French: Équipe de football de Côte d'Ivoire, recognized as the Côte d'Ivoire by FIFA) represents Ivory Coast in men's international football. Nicknamed the Elephants, the team is managed by the Ivorian Football Federation (FIF). The team has won the Africa Cup of Nations three times, in 1992, 2015 and 2023, and has qualified for the FIFA World Cup four times, in 2006, 2010, 2014 and 2026.

Ivory Coast's home colours are all orange. Since 2020 their home games have been played at Alassane Ouattara Stadium, in Abidjan. Prior to this their home ground was Felix Houphouet Boigny Stadium, also in Abidjan. Didier Zokora holds the record for number of caps, with 123. The nation's leading goalscorer is Didier Drogba, who scored 65 goals for the Elephants in 105 appearances.

== History ==
=== Early history: 1960s–1980s ===
The team played its first international match against Dahomey, now known as Benin, which they won 3–2 on 13 April 1960 in Madagascar.

The team achieved an 11–0 victory against the Central African Republic national football team. In 1961 the team made their first appearance in the Africa Cup of Nations. After gaining independence from France, the team finished third in the 1963 and 1965 tournaments.

Ivory Coast's performances in the 1970s were mixed. In the 1970 African Cup of Nations, the team finished top of their group, but lost to Ghana – the powerhouses of African football at the time – in the semi-finals, and went on to finish 4th after losing the third-place play-off to the United Arab Republic (now Egypt). They failed to qualify for the 1972 edition, losing 4–3 to Congo-Brazzaville in the final qualifying round, and then qualified in 1974 but finished bottom of their group with only a single point. Missing the 1976 tournament, the team initially qualified for 1978, beating Mali 2–1 on aggregate, but were disqualified for fielding an ineligible player in the second leg. Mali were also disqualified, due to police and stadium security assaulting the match officials during the first leg, resulting in Upper Volta, who Ivory Coast had beaten in the first qualifying round, inheriting their place.

In 1984, the team hosted the African Cup of Nations for the first time, but failed to get out of their group. In 1986, they narrowly qualified from their group on goals scored, and went on to finish third once more, beating Morocco 3–2 in the third-place play-off.

=== 1990s ===
At the 1992 Africa Cup of Nations, Ivory Coast beat Algeria 3–0 and drew 0–0 with Congo to finish top of their group. An extra-time victory over Zambia and a penalty shoot-out win over Cameroon took them to the final for the first time, where they faced Ghana. The match again went to a penalty shoot-out, which became, at the time, the highest-scoring in international football; Ivory Coast eventually triumphed 11–10 to win the title for the first time. They were unable to defend their title in 1994, losing to Nigeria in the semi-finals.

=== 2000s and World Cup debut ===
In October 2005, Ivory Coast secured qualification for the 2006 FIFA World Cup, their first-ever appearance at the tournament. Having been drawn into a "group of death" that also featured Cameroon and Egypt, Ivory Coast went into the final match second behind Cameroon, but qualified after beating Sudan 3–1 while Cameroon could only draw with Egypt.

Ivory Coast finished runners-up at the 2006 African Cup of Nations, with the tournament including another lengthy penalty shootout, where Ivory Coast defeated Cameroon 12–11.

In the tournament itself, Ivory Coast were drawn into another group of death, against Argentina, Netherlands, and Serbia and Montenegro. They lost 2–1 to Argentina – with Didier Drogba scoring the team's first-ever World Cup goal in the 82nd minute – and then 2–1 to the Netherlands, meaning they had already been eliminated by the time they played Serbia and Montenegro. After going 2–0 down after just 20 minutes, Ivory Coast came back to win 3–2, with Bonaventure Kalou scoring an 86th-minute penalty to give Ivory Coast their first-ever World Cup victory.

After Uli Stielike left before the 2008 African Cup of Nations due to his son's health, co-trainer Gerard Gili took his position. To compensate of the lack of another co-coach, Didier Drogba acted as a player-coach. This was only the second time that a player had also acted as a coach at the tournament, after George Weah was both player and coach for Liberia during the 2002 tournament.

=== 2010s ===
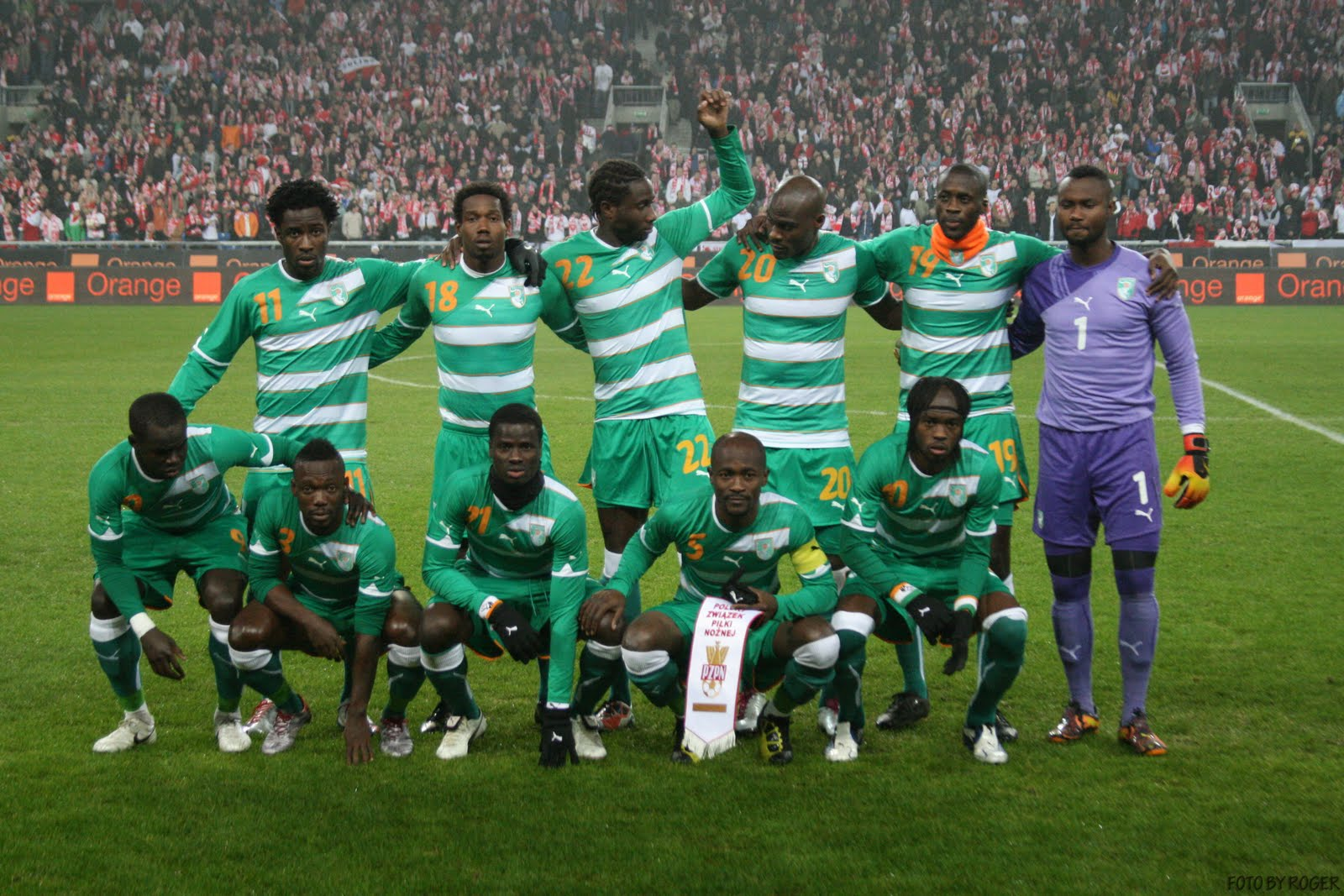
The national football team of the Côte d'Ivoire before a match against Poland in 2010

Ivory Coast qualified for the 2010 FIFA World Cup in South Africa, and were again drawn in a group of death, against five-time champions Brazil, Portugal, and North Korea. Having managed a 0–0 draw against Portugal, a 3–1 defeat to Brazil meant that in order to qualify from their group, they would have to beat North Korea, while Brazil needed to beat Portugal, and thanks to Portugal's 7–0 win over North Korea, there needed to be a substantial swing in goal difference. Ivory Coast won 3–0, but Portugal held Brazil to a 0–0 draw and Ivory Coast were once again eliminated in the group stage.

The team made a third appearance in the 2014 FIFA World Cup in Brazil, where they were drawn into Group C against Colombia, Greece, and Japan. After coming from behind to beat Japan 2–1, Ivory Coast then lost 2–1 to Colombia, leaving their qualification in the balance. In their final match against Greece, the score was 1–1 going into stoppage time, and with Japan losing 4–1 to Colombia, Ivory Coast looked set to qualify. However, in the 93rd minute, Giovanni Sio gave away a penalty which Georgios Samaras converted, giving Greece both the victory and the place in the last 16; Ivory Coast, meanwhile, went out in the group stage for the third tournament in a row.

In 2015, the national team won the Africa Cup of Nations for the second time in Equatorial Guinea, defeating Ghana in a 22-shot penalty shootout, winning 9–8 after a scoreless game.

Ivory Coast failed to qualify for the 2018 FIFA World Cup. After needing a win in their final match against Morocco, they lost 2–0, meaning Morocco qualified instead.

=== 2020s ===
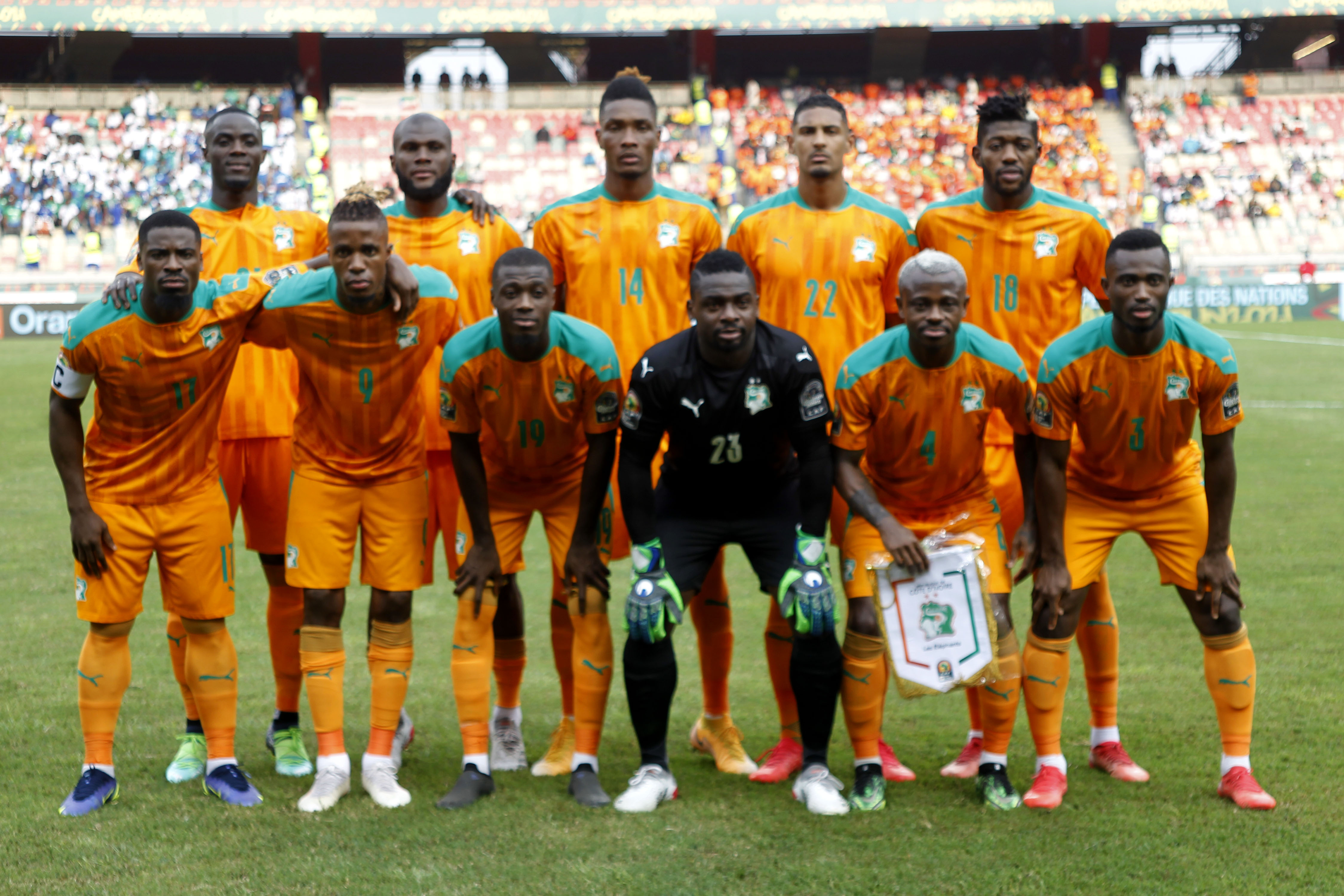
The national football team of the Côte d'Ivoire in 2022

In early 2024, Ivory Coast hosted the Africa Cup of Nations for the second time. Following a 4–0 defeat to Equatorial Guinea and third-placed finish in the group stage, coach Jean-Louis Gasset was dismissed, and assistant coach Emerse Faé was hired as caretaker in the knockout stages, as the national team qualified as one of the best third-placed teams. Later on, Ivory Coast managed to defeat the defending champions Senegal in the penalty shoot-outs, Mali after extra-time, and DR Congo in the semi-finals. They eventually won the title, defeating Nigeria 2–1 in the final, marking their third victory. For the first time in the history of the African Cup of Nations, the tournament was won by a team that changed coaches during the tournament.

== Home stadium ==
From 1964 to 2020, Felix Houphouet Boigny Stadium, a 50,000-seater stadium in Abidjan was the main venue used to host home matches. In 2020, the 60,000-seat Alassane Ouattara Stadium, also in Abidjan, was opened ahead of the 2023 Africa Cup of Nations.

== Supporters ==
Supporters of the Elephants are known to be among the most colorful in Africa. At Ivory Coast matches, the Elephants supporter sections typically include a percussion band that mimics the sounds of an elephant traveling through a forest.

== Results and fixtures ==
The following is a list of match results in the last 12 months, as well as any future matches that have been scheduled.

Win Draw Loss Fixture

=== 2025 ===
| 24 December 2025 AFCON GS | Ivory Coast | 1–0 | Mozambique | Marrakesh, Morocco |
| 18:30 UTC+1 | Amad 49' | Report | | Stadium: Marrakesh Stadium; Attendance: 13,041; Referee: Samuel Uwikunda (Rwanda) |

| 28 December 2025 AFCON GS | Ivory Coast | 1–1 | Cameroon | Marrakesh, Morocco |
| 21:00 UTC+1 | Amad 51' | Report | Konan 56' (o.g.) | Stadium: Marrakesh Stadium; Attendance: 35,165; Referee: Mustapha Ghorbal (Algeria) |

| 31 December 2025 AFCON GS | Gabon | 2–3 | Ivory Coast | Marrakesh, Morocco |
| 20:00 UTC+1 | Kanga 11'; Bouanga 21' | Report | Krasso 44'; Guessand 84'; Touré 90+1' | Stadium: Marrakesh Stadium; Attendance: 20,838; Referee: Omar Artan (Somalia) |

=== 2026 ===
| 6 January 2025 AFCON R16 | Ivory Coast | 3–0 | Burkina Faso | Marrakesh, Morocco |
| 20:00 UTC+1 | Amad 20'; Y. Diomande 32'; Touré 87' | Report | | Stadium: Marrakesh Stadium; Referee: Mahmood Ismail (Sudan) |

| 10 January 2025 AFCON Quarter-finals | Egypt | 3–2 | Ivory Coast | Agadir, Morocco |
| 20:00 UTC+1 | Marmoush 4'; Rabia 32'; Salah 52' | Report | Abou El Fotouh 40' (o.g.); Doué 73' | Stadium: Adrar Stadium; Attendance: 31,213; Referee: Mustapha Ghorbal (Algeria) |

| 28 March Friendly | South Korea | 0–4 | Ivory Coast | Milton Keynes, England |
| 14:00 UTC+0 | | Report | Guessand 35'; Adingra 45+1'; Godo 62'; Singo 90+3' | Stadium: Stadium MK; Attendance: 5,917; Referee: Ian McNabb (Northern Ireland) |

| 31 March Friendly | Scotland | 0–1 | Ivory Coast | Liverpool, England |
| 19:30 UTC+1 | | Report | Pépé 12' | Stadium: Hill Dickinson Stadium; Attendance: 33,034; Referee: Daniel Elder (Australia) |

| 4 June Friendly | France | 1–2 | Ivory Coast | Nantes, France |
| 21:10 UTC+2 | R. Cherki 45' | Report | G. Doué 53'; Amad 84' | Stadium: Stade de la Beaujoire; Attendance: 35,322; Referee: Sebastian Gishamer (Austria) |

| 8 June Unofficial friendly | Philadelphia Union II (United States) | 0–2 | Ivory Coast | Chester, Pennsylvania, United States |
| 19:00 UTC−7 | | Report | Guessand 9'; Bonny 40' | Stadium: Subaru Park; Attendance: 18,500 |

| 14 June 2026 FIFA World Cup GS (Group E) | Ivory Coast | 1–0 | Ecuador | Philadelphia, Pennsylvania, United States |
| 19:00 UTC−4 | Amad 90' | Report | | Stadium: Lincoln Financial Field; Attendance: 68,274; Referee: François Letexier (France) |

| 20 June 2026 FIFA World Cup GS (Group E) | Germany | 2–1 | Ivory Coast | Toronto, Ontario, Canada |
| 16:00 UTC−4 | Undav 68', 90+4' | Report | Kessie 30' | Stadium: BMO Field; Attendance: 43,036; Referee: Juan Gabriel Benítez (Paraguay) |

| 25 June 2026 FIFA World Cup GS (Group E) | Curaçao | 0–2 | Ivory Coast | Philadelphia, Pennsylvania, United States |
| 16:00 UTC−4 | | Report | Pépé 7', 64' | Stadium: Lincoln Financial Field; Attendance: 68,324; Referee: Glenn Nyberg (Sweden) |

| 30 June 2026 FIFA World Cup Round of 32 | Ivory Coast | 1–2 | Norway | Arlington, Texas, United States |
| 12:00 UTC−5 | Diallo 74' | Report | Nusa 39'; Haaland 86' | Stadium: AT&T Stadium; Attendance: 69,665; Referee: Jesús Valenzuela (Venezuela) |

| 24 September 2027 AFCON qualification | Ivory Coast | 2–0 | Ghana | Bouaké, Ivory Coast |
| 19:00 UTC+0 | Yalcouyé 44'; Kessié 58' (pen.) | Report | | Stadium: Bouaké Stadium; Referee: Mustapha Ghorbal (Algeria) |

| 29 September 2027 AFCON qualification | Somalia | 0–2 | Ivory Coast | Abidjan, Ivory Coast |
| 19:00 UTC+0 | | Report | Gboho 89'; Touré 90+5' | Stadium: Stade Félix Houphouët-Boigny; Referee: David Chinoko (Malawi) |

| 3 October Friendly | Ivory Coast | 0–1 | Cameroon | Abidjan, Ivory Coast |
| 19:00 UTC+0 | | Report | Nsongo 47' | Stadium: Alassane Ouattara Stadium |

| 11 November 2027 AFCON qualification | Ivory Coast | 2–1 | Gambia | Bouaké, Ivory Coast |
| 19:00 UTC+0 | Yalcouyé 17'; Wahi 24' | Report | Barrow 38' | Stadium: Bouaké Stadium; Referee: Abdou Abdel Mefire (Cameroon) |

| 17 November 2027 AFCON qualification | Gambia | v | Ivory Coast | Bakau, Gambia |
| 16:00 UTC+0 | Minteh 69'; Barrow 80' (pen.) | Report | Zogbé 13'; Inao Oulaï 90+8' | Stadium: Independence Stadium; Referee: Mehrez Melki (Tunisia) |

=== 2027 ===
| 24 March 2027 AFCON qualification | Ghana | v | Ivory Coast | TBD, Ghana |
| TBD | | | | Stadium: TBD |

| 28 March 2027 AFCON qualification | Ivory Coast | v | Somalia | TBD, Ivory Coast |
| TBD | | | | Stadium: TBD |

== Coaching staff ==
| Position | Name |
|---|---|
| Head coach | (France) Hervé Renard |
| Assistant coaches | (Ivory Coast) Guy Demel (Ivory Coast) Alain Gouaméné |
| Goalkeeping coach | (Ivory Coast) Gérard Gnanhouan |
| Fitness coach | (Ivory Coast) Tiémoko Diallo |
| Video analyst | (Ivory Coast) Hervé Yao N'Guessan |
| Doctor | (Ivory Coast) Rodrigue Kouassi |
| Physiotherapists | (Ivory Coast) Aurélien Koffi (Ivory Coast) Bakary Mendy (Ivory Coast) Gervais Soumaré |
| Masseur | (Ivory Coast) Patrice Ouattara |
| Ostheopath | (Ivory Coast) Mahamadou Bakayoko |
| Team nutritionist | (Ivory Coast) Elysée Sawadogo |
| Team cooks | (Ivory Coast) Yahia Diawara (Ivory Coast) Ezechiel Koné (Ivory Coast) Aminata Sidibé |
| Team coordinator | (Ivory Coast) Alphonse Sangaré |
| Technical director | (Ivory Coast) Boubacar Barry |
| Head of delegation | (Ivory Coast) Didier Zokora |

=== Coaching history ===
- (France) Paul Gévaudan (1960, 1967–68)
- (Ivory Coast) Alphonse Bissouma Tapé (1965)
- (West Germany) Peter Schnittger (1968–70)
- (Ivory Coast) Jean Tokpa (1970–72)
- (Brazil) Esquerdinha (1972–74)
- (Ivory Coast) Gérard Gabo (1976–80)
- (West Germany) Otto Pfister (1982–85)
- (Brazil) Duque (1984)
- (Argentina) Pancho Gonzales (1986)
- (Ivory Coast) Yeo Martial (1987–88, 1992)
- (Ivory Coast) Kaé Oulaï (1989)
- (Socialist Federal Republic of Yugoslavia) Radivoje Ognjanović (1989–92)
- (France) Philippe Troussier (1993)
- (Poland) Henryk Kasperczak (1993–94)
- (France) Pierre Pleimelding (1994–96)
- (France) Robert Nouzaret (1996–98, 2002–04)
- (France) Patrick Parizon (1999–2000)
- (Ivory Coast) Gbonke Tia (2000–01)
- (Ivory Coast) Lama Bamba (2001)
- (France) Henri Michel (2004–07)
- (Germany) Uli Stielike (2007–08)
- (France) Gérard Gili (2008)
- (Bosnia and Herzegovina) Vahid Halilhodžić (2008–10)
- (Ivory Coast) Georges Kouadio (2010)
- (Sweden) Sven-Göran Eriksson (2010)
- (Ivory Coast) François Zahoui (2010–12)
- (France) Sabri Lamouchi (2012–14)
- (France) Hervé Renard (2014–15)
- (France) Michel Dussuyer (2015–17)
- (Belgium) Marc Wilmots (2017)
- (Ivory Coast) Ibrahim Kamara (2018–20)
- (France) Patrice Beaumelle (2020–22)
- (France) Jean-Louis Gasset (2022–24)
- (Ivory Coast) Emerse Faé (2024–26)
- (France) Hervé Renard (2026–)

== Players ==
=== Current squad ===
The following players were named in the squad for the 2027 Africa Cup of Nations qualification matches against Gambia in November 2026.

Caps and goals updated as of 17 November 2026, after the second match against Gambia.

| No. | Pos. | Player | Date of birth (age) | Caps | Goals | Club |
|---|---|---|---|---|---|---|
| | GK | Yahia Fofana | 21 August 2000 (age 26) | 42 | 0 | (Turkish Football Federation) Çaykur Rizespor |
| | GK | Alban Lafont | 23 January 1999 (age 27) | 5 | 0 | (Turkish Football Federation) Amedspor |
| | GK | Mohamed Koné | 7 March 2002 (age 24) | 0 | 0 | (Royal Belgian Football Association) Charleroi |
| | DF | Evan Ndicka | 20 August 1999 (age 27) | 32 | 0 | (Italian Football Federation) Roma |
| | DF | Ousmane Diomande | 4 December 2003 (age 22) | 19 | 0 | (The Football Association) Nottingham Forest |
| | DF | Hassane Kamara | 5 March 1994 (age 32) | 12 | 0 | (Italian Football Federation) Udinese |
| | DF | Luck Zogbé | 24 March 2005 (age 21) | 9 | 1 | (French Football Federation) Brest |
| | DF | Kassoum Ouattara | 14 October 2004 (age 22) | 3 | 0 | (Turkish Football Federation) Beşiktaş |
| | DF | Oumar Solet | 7 February 2000 (age 26) | 1 | 0 | (Italian Football Federation) Udinese |
| | DF | Abdoul Ouattara | 22 October 2005 (age 21) | 0 | 0 | (The Football Association) Ipswich Town |
| | MF | Franck Kessié | 19 December 1996 (age 29) | 108 | 16 | (Italian Football Federation) Atalanta |
| | MF | Ibrahim Sangaré | 2 December 1997 (age 28) | 62 | 11 | (The Football Association) Nottingham Forest |
| | MF | Christ Inao Oulaï | 6 April 2006 (age 20) | 17 | 1 | (Italian Football Federation) Fiorentina |
| | MF | Malick Yalcouyé | 18 November 2005 (age 21) | 5 | 2 | (The Football Association) Brighton & Hove Albion |
| | MF | Patrick Zabi | 24 September 2006 (age 20) | 2 | 0 | (French Football Federation) Paris |
| | MF | Yaya Kader Fofana | 12 June 2004 (age 22) | 0 | 0 | (French Football Federation) Reims |
| | MF | Abdoulaye Kanté | 9 July 2005 (age 21) | 0 | 0 | (Saudi Arabian Football Federation) Al-Ettifaq |
| | MF | Jean Ives Valou | 22 December 2005 (age 20) | 0 | 0 | (Royal Spanish Football Federation) Getafe |
| | FW | Nicolas Pépé | 29 May 1995 (age 31) | 61 | 14 | (Royal Spanish Football Federation) Villarreal |
| | FW | Oumar Diakité | 20 December 2003 (age 22) | 33 | 6 | (Austrian Football Association) Sturm Graz |
| | FW | Amad Diallo | 11 July 2002 (age 24) | 25 | 8 | (The Football Association) Manchester United |
| | FW | Yan Diomande | 14 November 2006 (age 20) | 19 | 3 | (Royal Spanish Football Federation) Real Madrid |
| | FW | Bazoumana Touré | 2 March 2006 (age 20) | 12 | 3 | (The Football Association) Newcastle United |
| | FW | Elye Wahi | 2 January 2003 (age 23) | 10 | 1 | (French Football Federation) Nice |
| | FW | Martial Godo | 14 March 2003 (age 23) | 3 | 1 | (French Football Federation) Strasbourg |

=== Recent call-ups ===
The following players have also been called up to the squad within the last twelve months and are still eligible to represent.

| Pos. | Player | Date of birth (age) | Caps | Goals | Club | Latest call-up |
|---|---|---|---|---|---|---|
| GK | Ira Eliezer Tapé | 31 August 1997 (age 29) | 2 | 0 | (South Africa) TS Galaxy | 2026 FIFA World Cup ^{PRE} |
| DF | Emmanuel Agbadou | 7 June 1997 (age 29) | 27 | 2 | (Turkey) Beşiktaş | v. Gambia, 11 November 2026 ^{INJ} |
| DF | Ghislain Konan | 27 December 1995 (age 30) | 59 | 0 | (England) Wolverhampton Wanderers | v. Cameroon, 3 October 2026 |
| DF | Odilon Kossounou | 4 January 2001 (age 25) | 39 | 0 | (Italy) Atalanta | v. Cameroon, 3 October 2026 |
| DF | Guéla Doué | 17 October 2002 (age 24) | 24 | 3 | (Germany) Bayer Leverkusen | v. Cameroon, 3 October 2026 |
| DF | Christ Tapé | 2 March 2006 (age 20) | 1 | 0 | (France) Toulouse | v. Cameroon, 3 October 2026 |
| DF | Wilfried Singo | 25 December 2000 (age 25) | 36 | 1 | (Turkey) Galatasaray | 2026 FIFA World Cup |
| DF | Christopher Opéri | 29 April 1997 (age 29) | 13 | 0 | (Turkey) İstanbul Başakşehir | 2026 FIFA World Cup |
| DF | Clément Akpa | 24 November 2001 (age 24) | 5 | 0 | (France) Auxerre | 2026 FIFA World Cup ^{INJ} |
| DF | Jean-Philippe Gbamin | 25 September 1995 (age 31) | 23 | 0 | (Bulgaria) CSKA Sofia | 2025 Africa Cup of Nations |
| DF | Willy Boly | 3 February 1991 (age 35) | 22 | 1 | Unattached | 2025 Africa Cup of Nations |
| DF | Armel Zohouri | 5 April 2001 (age 25) | 5 | 0 | (France) Reims | 2025 Africa Cup of Nations |
| MF | Amadou Koné | 14 May 2005 (age 21) | 1 | 0 | (Saudi Arabia) Neom | v. Cameroon, 3 October 2026 |
| MF | Eddy Doué | 11 December 2005 (age 20) | 0 | 0 | (Portugal) Estrela da Amadora | v. Cameroon, 3 October 2026 |
| MF | Parfait Guiagon | 22 February 2001 (age 25) | 5 | 0 | (Saudi Arabia) Al-Taawoun | 2026 FIFA World Cup |
| FW | Ange-Yoan Bonny | 25 October 2003 (age 23) | 7 | 0 | (Italy) Inter Milan | v. Gambia, 11 November 2026 ^{PRE} |
| FW | Rayan Fofana | 12 February 2006 (age 20) | 2 | 0 | (France) Le Havre | v. Cameroon, 3 October 2026 |
| FW | Yann Gboho | 14 January 2001 (age 25) | 2 | 1 | (England) Coventry City | v. Cameroon, 3 October 2026 |
| FW | Simon Adingra | 1 January 2002 (age 24) | 30 | 5 | (Netherlands) Ajax | 2026 FIFA World Cup |
| FW | Evann Guessand | 1 July 2001 (age 25) | 23 | 4 | (England) Crystal Palace | 2026 FIFA World Cup |
| FW | Sébastien Haller | 22 June 1994 (age 32) | 34 | 11 | (Japan) Sanfrecce Hiroshima | 2026 FIFA World Cup ^{PRE} |
| FW | Bénie Traoré | 30 November 2002 (age 23) | 7 | 0 | (United States) New York City | v. Scotland, 31 March 2026 |
| FW | Wilfried Zaha | 10 November 1992 (age 34) | 36 | 5 | Unattached | 2025 Africa Cup of Nations |
| FW | Jean-Philippe Krasso | 17 July 1997 (age 29) | 28 | 9 | (France) Paris | 2025 Africa Cup of Nations |
| FW | Vakoun Issouf Bayo | 10 January 1997 (age 29) | 12 | 3 | (Italy) Udinese | 2025 Africa Cup of Nations |
^{DEC} Player refused to join the team after the call-up.; ^{INJ} Player withdrew from the squad due to an injury.; ^{PRE} Preliminary squad.; ^{SUS} Suspended from the national team.

== Records ==
As of 30 June 2026
Players in bold are still active with Ivory Coast.

=== Most appearances ===
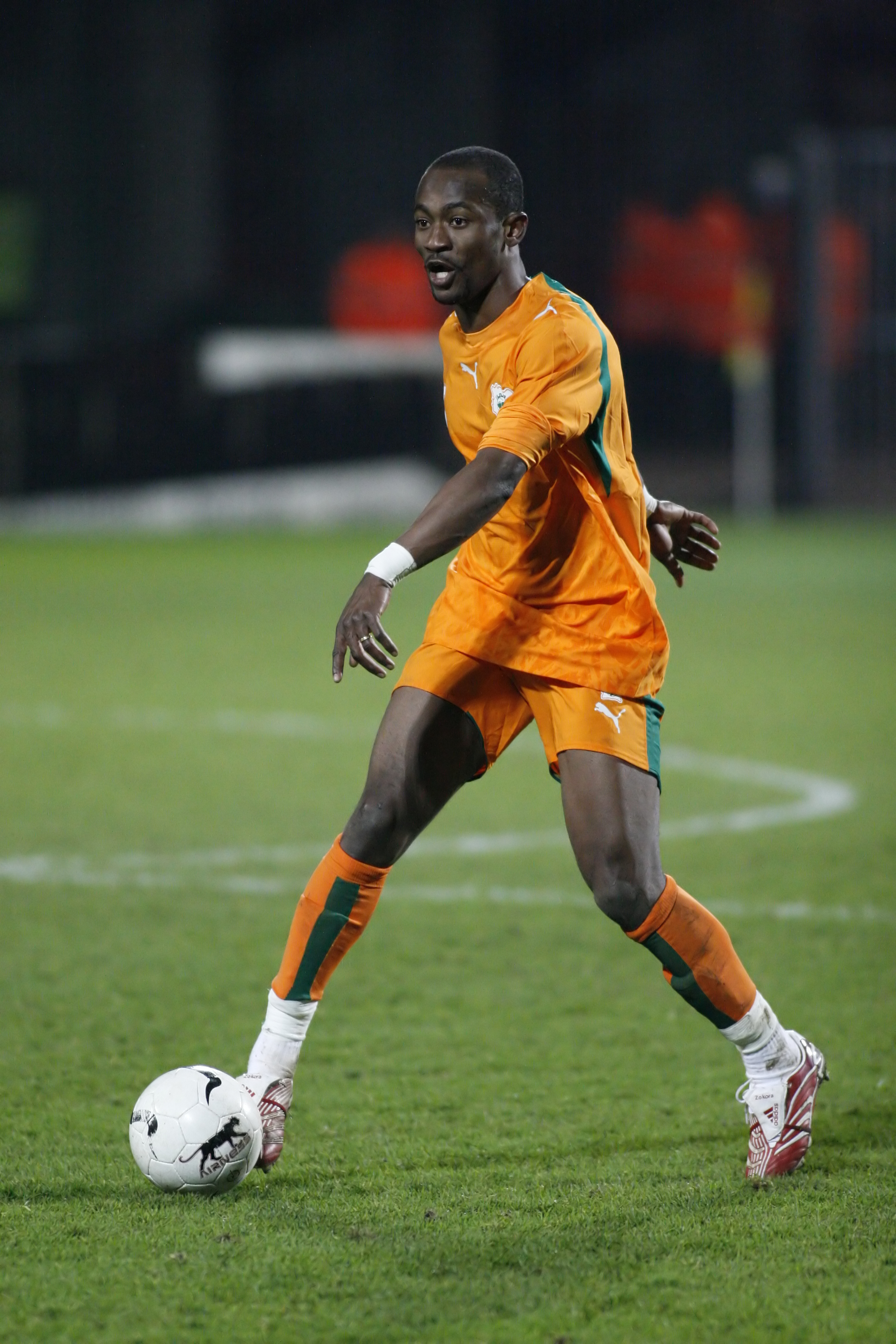
Didier Zokora, the all-time most capped player for Ivory Coast

| Rank | Player | Caps | Goals | Career |
|---|---|---|---|---|
| 1 | Didier Zokora | 123 | 1 | 2000–2014 |
| 2 | Kolo Touré (Note: Touré appeared in two matches that are not considered official matches by FIFA. One against Cameroon in 2009, as it was played over three periods of 30 minutes, and a match against a Nigeria XI in 2015, where no documentation was submitted before the match.) | 121 | 7 | 2000–2015 |
| 3 | Max Gradel (Note: Gradel appeared in three matches that are not considered official matches by FIFA. A match against Mali in 2012, as it did not have FIFA permission, and a match against a Nigeria XI in 2015, where no documentation was submitted before the match, and a match against a Sweden League XI in 2017.) | 110 | 18 | 2011–2024 |
| 4 | **Franck Kessié** (Note: Kessié also appeared in a match against Mali in 2023, however the match was abandoned at half-time due to rain, therefore it is not counted by FIFA.) | 107 | 16 | 2014–present |
| 5 | Didier Drogba (Note: Drogba also appeared in a match against Cameroon in 2009, scoring one goal, however it was played over three periods of 30 minutes, therefore it is not considered an official match by FIFA.) | 105 | 65 | 2002–2014 |
| 6 | Yaya Touré (Note: Touré appeared in two matches that are not considered official matches by FIFA. One against Cameroon in 2009, as it was played over three periods of 30 minutes, and a match against a Nigeria XI in 2015, where no documentation was submitted before the match.) | 101 | 19 | 2004–2015 |
| 7 | Siaka Tiéné (Note: Tiéné also appeared in a match against Cameroon in 2009, however it was played over three periods of 30 minutes, therefore it is not considered an official match by FIFA.) | 100 | 2 | 2000–2015 |
| 8 | Salomon Kalou (Note: Kalou also appeared in a match against a Nigeria XI in 2015, scoring one goal, however no documentation was submitted before the match, therefore it is not considered an official match by FIFA.) | 96 | 27 | 2007–2017 |
| 9 | Serge Aurier (Note: Aurier appeared in two matches that are not considered official matches by FIFA. One against a Nigeria XI in 2015, as no documentation was submitted before the match, and a match against a Sweden League XI in 2017.) | 93 | 4 | 2013–2024 |
| 10 | Abdoulaye Traoré (Note: Traoré also appeared in a match against Nigeria U-20s in 1991, scoring one goal, however this wasn't a full international 'A' side, therefore it is not considered an official match by FIFA.) | 90 | 49 | 1984–1996 |

=== Top goalscorers ===
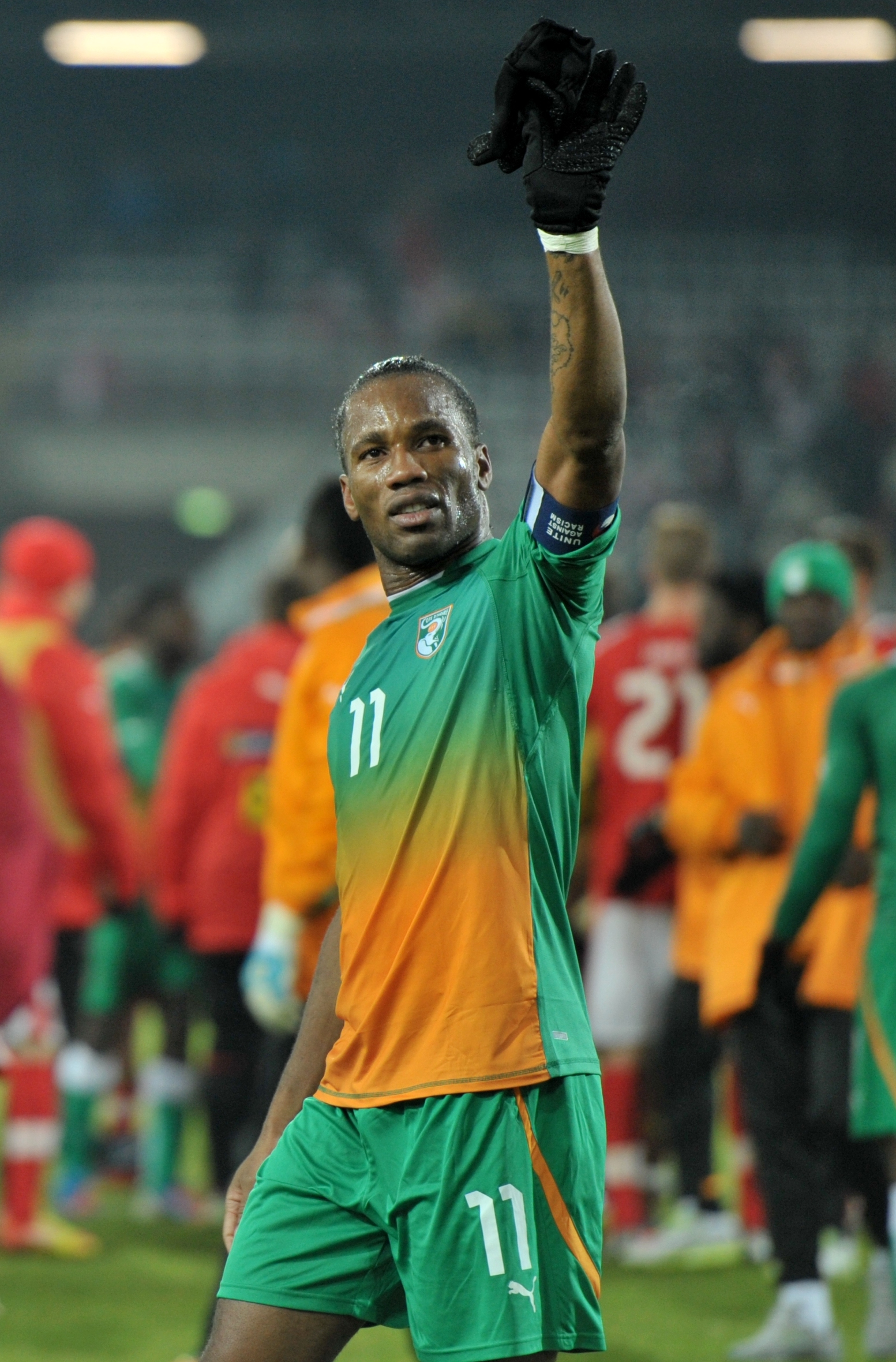
Didier Drogba, the all-time top goalscorer for Ivory Coast

| Rank | Player | Goals | Caps | Ratio | Career |
|---|---|---|---|---|---|
| 1 | Didier Drogba (list) | 65 | 105 | 0.62 | 2002–2014 |
| 2 | Abdoulaye Traoré | 49 | 90 | 0.54 | 1984–1996 |
| 3 | Joël Tiéhi | 28 | 50 | 0.56 | 1985–1999 |
| 4 | Salomon Kalou | 27 | 96 | 0.28 | 2007–2017 |
| 5 | Gervinho (Note: Gervinho appeared in two matches that are not considered official matches by FIFA. One against Cameroon in 2009, as it was played over three periods of 30 minutes, and a match against a Nigeria XI in 2015, where no documentation was submitted before the match.) | 23 | 86 | 0.27 | 2007–2021 |
| 6 | Ibrahima Bakayoko | 22 | 39 | 0.56 | 1996–2002 |
| 7 | Laurent Pokou | 21 | 30 | 0.7 | 1967–1980 |
| 8 | Yaya Touré | 19 | 101 | 0.19 | 2004–2015 |
| 9 | Aruna Dindane | 18 | 62 | 0.29 | 2000–2010 |
| 9 | Max Gradel | 18 | 110 | 0.16 | 2011–2024 |

== Competitive record ==
=== FIFA World Cup ===
| FIFA World Cup record | | | | | | | | | | Qualification record | | | | | |
| Year | Round | Position | Pld | W | D* | L | GF | GA | Squad | Pld | W | D | L | GF | GA |
|---|---|---|---|---|---|---|---|---|---|---|---|---|---|---|---|
| 1930 to 1958 | Part of France | | | | | | | | | Part of France | | | | | |
| (Chile) 1962 | Not a FIFA member | | | | | | | | | Not a FIFA member | | | | | |
| 1966 and 1970 | Did not enter | | | | | | | | | Did not enter | | | | | |
| (West Germany) 1974 | Did not qualify | | | | | | | | | 6 | 3 | 2 | 1 | 8 | 7 |
| (Argentina) 1978 | Did not qualify | | | | | | | | | 6 | 3 | 2 | 1 | 11 | 10 |
| (Spain) 1982 | Did not enter | | | | | | | | | Did not enter | | | | | |
| (Mexico) 1986 | Did not qualify | | | | | | | | | 4 | 1 | 1 | 2 | 6 | 5 |
| (Italy) 1990 | Did not qualify | | | | | | | | | 4 | 1 | 2 | 1 | 5 | 1 |
| (United States) 1994 | Did not qualify | | | | | | | | | 8 | 4 | 3 | 1 | 12 | 6 |
| (France) 1998 | Did not qualify | | | | | | | | | 2 | 0 | 1 | 1 | 1 | 3 |
| (South Korea) (Japan) 2002 | Did not qualify | | | | | | | | | 10 | 5 | 4 | 1 | 22 | 10 |
| (Germany) 2006 | Group stage | 19th | 3 | 1 | 0 | 2 | 5 | 6 | Squad | 10 | 7 | 1 | 2 | 20 | 7 |
| (South Africa) 2010 | Group stage | 17th | 3 | 1 | 1 | 1 | 4 | 3 | Squad | 12 | 8 | 4 | 0 | 29 | 6 |
| (Brazil) 2014 | Group stage | 21st | 3 | 1 | 0 | 2 | 4 | 5 | Squad | 8 | 5 | 3 | 0 | 19 | 7 |
| (Russia) 2018 | Did not qualify | | | | | | | | | 8 | 4 | 2 | 2 | 11 | 5 |
| (Qatar) 2022 | Did not qualify | | | | | | | | | 6 | 4 | 1 | 1 | 10 | 3 |
| (Canada) (Mexico) (United States) 2026 | Round of 32 | 19th | 4 | 2 | 0 | 2 | 5 | 4 | Squad | 10 | 8 | 2 | 0 | 25 | 0 |
| (Morocco) (Portugal) (Spain) 2030 | To be determined | | | | | | | | | To be determined | | | | | |
| (Saudi Arabia) 2034 | To be determined | | | | | | | | | To be determined | | | | | |
| Total: 4/23 | Round of 32 | 17th | 13 | 5 | 1 | 7 | 18 | 18 | − | 94 | 53 | 28 | 13 | 179 | 70 |

=== Africa Cup of Nations ===
| Africa Cup of Nations record | | | | | | | | | Qualification record | | | | | |
| Year | Round | Position | Pld | W | D* | L | GF | GA | Pld | W | D* | L | GF | GA |
|---|---|---|---|---|---|---|---|---|---|---|---|---|---|---|
| (Sudan) 1957 | Part of France | | | | | | | | Part of France | | | | | |
| (United Arab Republic) 1959 | Part of France | | | | | | | | Part of France | | | | | |
| (Ethiopia) 1962 | Not affiliated to CAF | | | | | | | | Not affiliated to CAF | | | | | |
| (Ghana) 1963 | Not affiliated to CAF | | | | | | | | Not affiliated to CAF | | | | | |
| (Tunisia) 1965 | Third place | 3rd | 3 | 2 | 0 | 1 | 5 | 4 | 4 | 3 | 0 | 1 | 9 | 4 |
| (Ethiopia) 1968 | Third place | 3rd | 5 | 3 | 0 | 2 | 9 | 6 | 4 | 3 | 1 | 0 | 7 | 0 |
| (Sudan) 1970 | Fourth place | 4th | 5 | 2 | 0 | 3 | 11 | 9 | 2 | 1 | 1 | 0 | 4 | 0 |
| (Cameroon) 1972 | Did not qualify | | | | | | | | 4 | 3 | 0 | 1 | 6 | 5 |
| (Egypt) 1974 | Group stage | 7th | 3 | 0 | 1 | 2 | 2 | 5 | 4 | 4 | 0 | 0 | 10 | 5 |
| (Ethiopia) 1976 | Did not qualify | | | | | | | | 2 | 0 | 2 | 0 | 2 | 2 |
| (Ghana) 1978 | Banned | | | | | | | | Banned | | | | | |
| (Nigeria) 1980 | Group stage | 6th | 3 | 0 | 2 | 1 | 2 | 3 | 4 | 4 | 0 | 0 | 8 | 2 |
| (Libya) 1982 | Did not enter | | | | | | | | Did not enter | | | | | |
| (Ivory Coast) 1984 | Group stage | 5th | 3 | 1 | 0 | 2 | 4 | 4 | Qualified as hosts | | | | | |
| (Egypt) 1986 | Third place | 3rd | 5 | 3 | 0 | 2 | 7 | 5 | 4 | 3 | 1 | 0 | 9 | 1 |
| (Morocco) 1988 | Group stage | 6th | 3 | 0 | 3 | 0 | 2 | 2 | 4 | 4 | 0 | 0 | 4 | 3 |
| (Algeria) 1990 | Group stage | 6th | 3 | 1 | 0 | 2 | 3 | 5 | 4 | 3 | 1 | 0 | 10 | 3 |
| (Senegal) 1992 | Champions | 1st | 5 | 2 | 3 | 0 | 4 | 0 | 6 | 5 | 0 | 1 | 9 | 3 |
| (Tunisia) 1994 | Third place | 3rd | 5 | 3 | 1 | 1 | 11 | 5 | Qualified as defending champions | | | | | |
| (South Africa) 1996 | Group stage | 11th | 3 | 1 | 0 | 2 | 2 | 5 | 4 | 1 | 2 | 1 | 5 | 4 |
| (Burkina Faso) 1998 | Quarter-finals | 5th | 4 | 2 | 2 | 0 | 10 | 6 | 6 | 4 | 1 | 1 | 10 | 8 |
| (Ghana) (Nigeria) 2000 | Group stage | 9th | 3 | 1 | 1 | 1 | 3 | 4 | 6 | 3 | 2 | 1 | 7 | 2 |
| (Mali) 2002 | Group stage | 16th | 3 | 0 | 1 | 2 | 1 | 4 | 8 | 4 | 3 | 1 | 17 | 4 |
| (Tunisia) 2004 | Did not qualify | | | | | | | | 4 | 2 | 1 | 1 | 8 | 3 |
| (Egypt) 2006 | Runners-up | 2nd | 6 | 3 | 2 | 1 | 6 | 5 | 10 | 7 | 1 | 2 | 20 | 7 |
| (Ghana) 2008 | Fourth place | 4th | 6 | 4 | 0 | 2 | 16 | 9 | 4 | 3 | 1 | 0 | 13 | 0 |
| (Angola) 2010 | Quarter-finals | 8th | 3 | 1 | 1 | 1 | 5 | 4 | 12 | 8 | 4 | 0 | 29 | 6 |
| (Gabon) (Equatorial Guinea) 2012 | Runners-up | 2nd | 6 | 5 | 1 | 0 | 9 | 0 | 6 | 6 | 0 | 0 | 19 | 5 |
| (South Africa) 2013 | Quarter-finals | 5th | 4 | 2 | 1 | 1 | 8 | 5 | 2 | 2 | 0 | 0 | 6 | 2 |
| (Equatorial Guinea) 2015 | Champions | 1st | 6 | 3 | 3 | 0 | 9 | 4 | 6 | 3 | 1 | 2 | 13 | 11 |
| (Gabon) 2017 | Group stage | 11th | 3 | 0 | 2 | 1 | 2 | 3 | 4 | 1 | 3 | 0 | 3 | 1 |
| (Egypt) 2019 | Quarter-finals | 5th | 5 | 3 | 1 | 1 | 7 | 3 | 6 | 3 | 2 | 1 | 12 | 5 |
| (Cameroon) 2021 | Round of 16 | 10th | 4 | 2 | 2 | 0 | 6 | 3 | 6 | 4 | 1 | 1 | 11 | 5 |
| (Ivory Coast) 2023 | Champions | 1st | 7 | 4 | 1 | 2 | 8 | 8 | 6 | 4 | 1 | 1 | 9 | 5 |
| (Morocco) 2025 | Quarter-finals | 6th | 5 | 3 | 1 | 1 | 10 | 6 | 6 | 4 | 0 | 2 | 12 | 3 |
| (Kenya) (Tanzania) (Uganda) 2027 | To be determined | | | | | | | | To be determined | | | | | |
| 2028 | To be determined | | | | | | | | To be determined | | | | | |
| Total | 3 Titles | 26/35 | 111 | 51 | 29 | 31 | 162 | 117 | 138 | 92 | 29 | 17 | 272 | 99 |

*Denotes draws include knockout matches decided via penalty shoot-out.
**Gold background colour indicates that the tournament was won.
***Red border colour indicates tournament was held on home soil.

=== African Nations Championship ===
African Nations Championship record
Appearances: 5
| Year | Round | Position | Pld | W | D* | L | GF | GA |
|---|---|---|---|---|---|---|---|---|
| (Ivory Coast) 2009 | Group stage | 8th | 3 | 0 | 1 | 2 | 0 | 4 |
| (Sudan) 2011 | Group stage | 12th | 3 | 1 | 0 | 2 | 2 | 4 |
| (South Africa) 2014 | Did not qualify | | | | | | | |
| (Rwanda) 2016 | Third place | 3rd | 6 | 4 | 0 | 2 | 10 | 4 |
| (Morocco) 2018 | Group stage | 14th | 3 | 0 | 1 | 2 | 0 | 3 |
| (Cameroon) 2020 | Did not qualify | | | | | | | |
| (Algeria) 2022 | Quarter-finals | 6th | 4 | 1 | 1 | 2 | 3 | 3 |
| Total | Third place | 5/7 | 19 | 6 | 3 | 10 | 15 | 18 |

=== FIFA Confederations Cup ===
FIFA Confederations Cup record
| Year | Round | Position | Pld | W | D* | L | GF | GA | Squad |
|---|---|---|---|---|---|---|---|---|---|
| (Saudi Arabia) 1992 | Fourth place | 4th | 2 | 0 | 0 | 2 | 2 | 9 | Squad |
| (Saudi Arabia) 1995 to (Russia) 2017 | Did not qualify | | | | | | | | |
| Total | Fourth place | 1/10 | 2 | 0 | 0 | 2 | 2 | 9 | – |

=== African Games ===
African Games record
| Year | Rank | Pld | W | D | L | GF | GA |
|---|---|---|---|---|---|---|---|
| (Republic of the Congo) 1965 | 3 | 0 | 0 | 0 | 0 | 0 | 0 |
| (Kenya) 1987 | 5 | 0 | 0 | 0 | 0 | 0 | 0 |
| Total | 2/4 | 0 | 0 | 0 | 0 | 0 | 0 |

== Head-to-head record ==
As of 3 October 2026 after the match against Cameroon.

| Opponent | Pld | W | D | L | GF | GA | GD | Latest meeting | Best results | Worst results |
|---|---|---|---|---|---|---|---|---|---|---|
| Algeria | 26 | 7 | 10 | 9 | 29 | 30 | –1 | 27 January 2023 | Ivory Coast 3 – 1 Algeria (Cameroon, 2 January 2021) | Ivory Coast 1 – 4 Algeria (South Africa, 6 October 1996) |
| Angola | 6 | 5 | 0 | 1 | 16 | 7 | +9 | 26 March 2015 | Ivory Coast 5 – 2 Angola (Burkina Faso, 16 February 1998) | Ivory Coast 1 – 2 Angola (Friendlies, 17 November 2007) |
| Argentina | 2 | 0 | 0 | 2 | 1 | 6 | –5 | 10 June 2006 | – | Ivory Coast 1 – 2 Argentina (Germany, 10 June 2006) |
| Austria | 2 | 1 | 0 | 1 | 5 | 3 | +2 | 14 November 2012 | Ivory Coast 3 – 0 Austria (Friendlies, 14 November 2012) | Ivory Coast 2 – 3 Austria (Friendlies, 17 October 2007) |
| Belgium | 2 | 0 | 2 | 0 | 3 | 3 | 0 | 8 October 2020 | – | – |
| Benin | 18 | 12 | 4 | 2 | 38 | 12 | +26 | 23 March 2024 | Ivory Coast 6 – 2 Benin (Benin, 5 June 2011) | Ivory Coast 1 – 2 Benin (Friendlies, 6 September 2019) |
| Bosnia and Herzegovina | 1 | 0 | 0 | 1 | 1 | 2 | –1 | 30 May 2014 | – | Ivory Coast 1 – 2 Bosnia and Herzegovina (Friendlies, 30 May 2014) |
| Botswana | 4 | 2 | 2 | 0 | 11 | 1 | +10 | 22 June 2008 | Ivory Coast 6 – 0 Botswana (Ivory Coast, 22 June 2008) | – |
| Brazil | 1 | 0 | 0 | 1 | 1 | 3 | –2 | 20 June 2010 | – | Ivory Coast 1 – 3 Brazil (South Africa, 20 June 2010) |
| Burkina Faso | 25 | 11 | 9 | 5 | 37 | 23 | +14 | 6 January 2026 | Ivory Coast 5 – 0 Burkina Faso (Ivory Coast, 5 September 2009) | Ivory Coast 0 – 3 Burkina Faso (Burkina Faso, 28 December 2004) |
| Burundi | 7 | 7 | 0 | 0 | 16 | 2 | +14 | 5 September 2025 | Ivory Coast 6 – 1 Burundi (Ivory Coast, 8 June 2003) | – |
| Cameroon | 23 | 8 | 6 | 9 | 25 | 29 | –4 | 3 October 2026 | Ivory Coast 3 – 0 Cameroon (Ghana, 30 January 2000) | Ivory Coast 1 – 4 Cameroon (Cameroon, 10 September 2014) |
| Canada | 1 | 0 | 1 | 0 | 0 | 0 | 0 | 11 June 2025 | – | – |
| Central African Republic | 5 | 3 | 1 | 1 | 19 | 5 | +14 | 16 October 2018 | Ivory Coast 11 – 0 Central African Republic (Friendlies, 27 December 1961) | Ivory Coast 2 – 4 Central African Republic (Ivory Coast, 16 September 1973) |
| Chad | 2 | 2 | 0 | 0 | 6 | 0 | +6 | 19 November 2024 | Ivory Coast 4 – 0 Chad (Ivory Coast, 19 November 2024) | – |
| Chile | 1 | 0 | 1 | 0 | 1 | 1 | 0 | 30 May 2006 | – | – |
| Colombia | 1 | 0 | 0 | 1 | 1 | 2 | –1 | 19 June 2014 | – | Ivory Coast 1 – 2 Colombia (Brazil, 19 June 2014) |
| Comoros | 3 | 3 | 0 | 0 | 8 | 2 | +6 | 28 March 2023 | Ivory Coast 3 – 1 Comoros (Friendlies, 24 March 2023) | – |
| Congo | 22 | 12 | 3 | 7 | 30 | 24 | +6 | 15 July 2001 | Ivory Coast 3 – 1 Congo (Congo, 27 February 1977) | Ivory Coast 1 – 4 Congo (Friendlies, 21 November 1965) |
| DR Congo | 21 | 8 | 6 | 7 | 31 | 29 | +1 | 15 July 2001 | Ivory Coast 3 – 1 DR Congo (Equatorial Guinea, 4 February 2015) | Ivory Coast 3 – 4 DR Congo (Ivory Coast, 15 October 2014) |
| Curaçao | 1 | 1 | 0 | 0 | 2 | 0 | +2 | 25 June 2026 | Ivory Coast 2 – 0 Curaçao (United States, 25 June 2026) | – |
| Ecuador | 1 | 1 | 0 | 0 | 1 | 0 | +1 | 14 June 2026 | Ivory Coast 1 – 0 Ecuador (United States, 14 June 2026) | – |
| Egypt | 23 | 6 | 6 | 11 | 25 | 31 | –6 | 10 January 2026 | Ivory Coast 3 – 1 Egypt (Sudan, 2 March 1990) | Ivory Coast 1 – 4 Egypt (Ghana, 7 February 2008) |
| El Salvador | 2 | 2 | 0 | 0 | 4 | 2 | +2 | 5 June 2014 | Ivory Coast 2 – 1 Ecuador (Friendlies, 5 June 2014) | – |
| England | 1 | 0 | 0 | 1 | 0 | 3 | –3 | 29 March 2022 | – | Ivory Coast 0 – 3 England (Friendlies, 29 March 2022) |
| Equatorial Guinea | 4 | 2 | 1 | 1 | 5 | 5 | 0 | 22 January 2024 | Ivory Coast 3 – 0 England (Equatorial Guinea, 4 February 2012) | Ivory Coast 0 – 4 Equatorial Guinea (Ivory Coast, 22 January 2024) |
| Ethiopia | 6 | 4 | 0 | 2 | 12 | 5 | +7 | 30 March 2021 | Ivory Coast 6 – 1 Ethiopia (Sudan, 10 February 1970) | Ivory Coast 1 – 2 Ethiopia (Egypt, 19 November 2019) |
| France | 4 | 1 | 1 | 2 | 4 | 6 | –2 | 4 June 2026 | Ivory Coast 2 – 1 France (Friendlies, 4 June 2026) | Ivory Coast 0 – 3 France (Friendly, 17 August 2005) |
| Gabon | 19 | 11 | 4 | 4 | 30 | 12 | +18 | 31 December 2025 | Ivory Coast 5 – 0 Gabon (Egypt, 7 October 2006) | Ivory Coast 1 – 2 Gabon (Ivory Coast, 5 September 2017) |
| Gambia | 8 | 6 | 0 | 2 | 21 | 5 | +16 | 24 March 2005 | Ivory Coast 5 – 0 Gambia (Ivory Coast, 18 September 2002) | Ivory Coast 2 – 3 Gabon (Ivory Coast, 4 November 1984) |
| Germany | 2 | 0 | 1 | 1 | 3 | 4 | –1 | 10 June 2026 | – | Ivory Coast 1 – 2 Germany (Canada, 20 June 2026) |
| Ghana | 54 | 17 | 12 | 15 | 51 | 54 | –3 | 24 September 2026 | Ivory Coast 3 – 0 Ghana (Ghana, 28 October 1973) | Ivory Coast 2 – 4 Ghana (Ghana, 9 February 2008) |
| Greece | 1 | 0 | 0 | 1 | 1 | 2 | –1 | 24 June 2014 | – | Ivory Coast 1 – 2 Greece (Brazil, 24 June 2014) |
| Guinea | 23 | 14 | 6 | 3 | 44 | 25 | +19 | 27 September 2022 | Ivory Coast 5 – 0 Guinea (Ghana, 3 February 2008) | Ivory Coast 2 – 4 Guinea (Friendlies, 22 March 1970) |
| Guinea-Bissau | 2 | 2 | 0 | 0 | 6 | 1 | +5 | 13 January 2024 | Ivory Coast 4 – 1 Guinea-Bissau (Ivory Coast, 10 June 2001) | – |
| Hungary | 1 | 0 | 1 | 0 | 0 | 0 | 0 | 20 May 2016 | – | – |
| Israel | 2 | 1 | 1 | 0 | 6 | 5 | +1 | 10 August 2011 | Ivory Coast 4 – 3 Israel (Friendlies, 10 August 2011) | – |
| Italy | 2 | 1 | 1 | 0 | 2 | 1 | +1 | 10 August 2010 | Ivory Coast 1 – 0 Italy (Friendlies, 10 August 2010) | – |
| Japan | 5 | 2 | 0 | 3 | 4 | 4 | 0 | 13 October 2020 | Ivory Coast 2 – 0 Japan (Friendlies, 4 June 2010) | Ivory Coast 0 – 1 Japan (Friendlies, 13 October 2020) |
| Jordan | 1 | 1 | 0 | 0 | 2 | 0 | +2 | 17 January 2006 | Ivory Coast 2 – 0 Jordan (Friendlies, 17 January 2006) | Ivory Coast 0 – 1 Japan (Friendlies, 13 October 2020) |
| Kenya | 3 | 2 | 1 | 0 | 7 | 0 | +7 | 14 October 2025 | Ivory Coast 4 – 0 Kenya (Friendlies, 15 December 1991) | Ivory Coast 0 – 1 Japan (Friendlies, 13 October 2020) |
| North Korea | 1 | 1 | 0 | 0 | 3 | 0 | +3 | 25 June 2010 | Ivory Coast 3 – 0 North Korea (South Africa, 25 June 2010) | – |
| South Korea | 2 | 1 | 0 | 1 | 4 | 2 | +2 | 28 March 2026 | Ivory Coast 4 – 0 South Korea (Friendlies, 28 March 2026) | Ivory Coast 0 – 2 South Korea (Friendlies, 3 March 2010) |
| Kuwait | 1 | 1 | 0 | 0 | 2 | 0 | +2 | 12 January 2008 | Ivory Coast 2 – 0 Kuwait (Friendlies, 12 January 2008) | – |
| Lesotho | 2 | 1 | 1 | 0 | 1 | 0 | +1 | 9 September 2023 | Ivory Coast 1 – 0 Lesotho (Ivory Coast, 9 September 2023) | – |
| Liberia | 16 | 13 | 3 | 0 | 30 | 8 | +22 | 26 March 2019 | Ivory Coast 4 – 1 Liberia (Friendly, 5 June 1994) | – |
| Libya | 7 | 6 | 1 | 0 | 11 | 2 | +9 | 16 January 2012 | Ivory Coast 3 – 0 Libya (Libya, 3 June 2001) | – |
| Madagascar | 12 | 10 | 2 | 0 | 37 | 6 | +31 | 17 November 2020 | Ivory Coast 6 – 0 Madagascar (Ivory Coast, 1 July 2001) | – |
| Malawi | 8 | 6 | 1 | 1 | 17 | 8 | +9 | 11 October 2021 | Ivory Coast 5 – 0 Malawi (Ivory Coast, 29 March 2009) | Ivory Coast 1 – 5 Malawi (Friendly, 6 July 1974) |
| Mali | 33 | 20 | 9 | 4 | 59 | 25 | +34 | 3 February 2024 | Ivory Coast 6 – 0 Mali (Ivory Coast, 31 March 1985) | Ivory Coast 1 – 3 Mali (Friendly, 25 November 1965) |
| Mauritania | 2 | 2 | 0 | 0 | 4 | 0 | +4 | 27 January 1991 | Ivory Coast 2 – 0 Mauritania (Mauritania, 27 January 1991) | – |
| Mauritius | 1 | 1 | 0 | 0 | 3 | 0 | +3 | 21 March 2007 | Ivory Coast 3 – 0 Mauritius (Friendly, 21 March 2007) | – |
| Mexico | 1 | 0 | 0 | 1 | 1 | 4 | –3 | 15 August 2013 | – | Ivory Coast 1 – 3 Mexico (Friendly, 15 August 2013) |
| Moldova | 1 | 0 | 0 | 1 | 1 | 2 | –1 | 27 March 2018 | – | Ivory Coast 1 – 2 Moldova (Friendly, 27 March 2018) |
| Morocco | 22 | 7 | 8 | 7 | 28 | 26 | +2 | 14 October 2023 | Ivory Coast 2 – 0 Morocco (Ivory Coast, 5 June 1995) | Ivory Coast 1 – 4 Morocco (Ivory Coast, 3 June 1973) |
| Mozambique | 8 | 6 | 2 | 0 | 14 | 2 | +12 | 24 December 2025 | Ivory Coast 4 – 1 Mozambique (Friendly, 29 January 1998) | – |
| Namibia | 6 | 3 | 1 | 2 | 12 | 8 | +4 | 1 July 2019 | Ivory Coast 4 – 1 Namibia (Egypt, 1 July 2019) | Ivory Coast 0 – 2 Namibia (Friendly, 10 December 1994) |
| Netherlands | 2 | 0 | 0 | 2 | 1 | 7 | –6 | 4 June 2017 | – | Ivory Coast 0 – 5 Netherlands (Friendly, 4 June 2017) |
| New Zealand | 1 | 0 | 0 | 1 | 0 | 1 | –1 | 7 June 2025 | – | Ivory Coast 0 – 1 New Zealand (Canada, 7 June 2025) |
| Niger | 20 | 15 | 2 | 3 | 41 | 15 | +26 | 26 March 2021 | Ivory Coast 6 – 0 Niger (Ivory Coast, 16 July 2000) | Ivory Coast 0 – 2 Niger (Ivory Coast, 22 September 2019) |
| Nigeria | 29 | 10 | 11 | 8 | 29 | 33 | –4 | 11 February 2024 | Ivory Coast 2 – 0 Nigeria (Ivory Coast, 27 July 2013) | Ivory Coast 0 – 4 Nigeria (Nigeria, 10 July 1977) |
| Norway | 1 | 0 | 0 | 1 | 1 | 2 | –1 | 30 June 2026 | – | Ivory Coast 1 – 2 Norway (United States, 30 June 2026) |
| Oman | 1 | 1 | 0 | 0 | 2 | 0 | +2 | 18 November 2025 | Ivory Coast 2 – 0 Oman (Friendly, 18 November 2025) | – |
| Paraguay | 2 | 0 | 2 | 0 | 3 | 3 | 0 | 30 May 2010 | – | – |
| Poland | 1 | 0 | 0 | 1 | 1 | 3 | –2 | 17 November 2010 | – | Ivory Coast 1 – 3 Poland (Friendly, 17 November 2010) |
| Portugal | 1 | 0 | 1 | 0 | 0 | 0 | 0 | 15 June 2010 | – | – |
| Qatar | 1 | 1 | 0 | 0 | 6 | 1 | +5 | 21 November 2007 | Ivory Coast 6 – 1 Qatar (Friendly, 21 November 2007) | – |
| Romania | 1 | 1 | 0 | 0 | 2 | 1 | +1 | 12 November 2005 | Ivory Coast 2 – 1 Romania (Friendly, 12 November 2005) | – |
| Russia | 2 | 1 | 1 | 0 | 3 | 1 | +2 | 24 March 2017 | Ivory Coast 2 – 0 Russia (Friendly, 24 March 2017) | – |
| Rwanda | 8 | 6 | 1 | 1 | 19 | 4 | +15 | 23 March 2019 | Ivory Coast 5 – 0 Rwanda (Friendly, 23 March 2019) | Ivory Coast 0 – 1 Rwanda (Rwanda, 16 January 2016) |
| Saudi Arabia | 1 | 0 | 0 | 1 | 0 | 1 | –1 | 14 November 2025 | – | Ivory Coast 0 – 1 Saudi Arabia (Friendly, 14 November 2025) |
| Scotland | 1 | 1 | 0 | 0 | 1 | 0 | +1 | 31 March 2026 | Ivory Coast 1 – 0 Scotland (Friendly, 31 March 2026) | – |
| Senegal | 26 | 13 | 5 | 8 | 30 | 24 | +6 | 29 January 2024 | Ivory Coast 4 – 1 Senegal (Friendly, 8 May 1997) | Ivory Coast 0 – 3 Senegal (Friendly, 20 November 1999) |
| Seychelles | 2 | 2 | 0 | 0 | 16 | 0 | +16 | 10 October 2025 | Ivory Coast 9 – 0 Seychelles (Ivory Coast, 17 November 2023) | Ivory Coast 0 – 3 Senegal (Friendly, 20 November 1999) |
| Sierra Leone | 10 | 7 | 2 | 1 | 21 | 6 | +15 | 15 October 2024 | Ivory Coast 5 – 1 Sierra Leone (Sierra Leone, 14 November 2014) | Ivory Coast 0 – 1 Sierra Leone (Ivory Coast, 15 October 2024) |
| Slovenia | 1 | 1 | 0 | 0 | 3 | 0 | +3 | 4 June 2006 | Ivory Coast 3 – 0 Slovenia (Friendly, 4 June 2006) | – |
| Somalia | 1 | 1 | 0 | 0 | 2 | 0 | +2 | 29 September 2026 | Ivory Coast 2 – 0 Somalia (Somalia, 29 September 2026) | – |
| South Africa | 8 | 1 | 5 | 2 | 5 | 7 | –2 | 17 October 2023 | Ivory Coast 1 – 0 South Africa (Egypt, 24 June 2019) | Ivory Coast 0 – 2 South Africa (Friendly, 30 November 2014) |
| Spain | 1 | 0 | 0 | 1 | 2 | 3 | –1 | 1 March 2006 | – | Ivory Coast 0 – 1 Spain (Friendly, 1 March 2006) |
| Sudan | 10 | 7 | 2 | 1 | 18 | 4 | +14 | 29 March 2016 | Ivory Coast 5 – 0 Sudan (Ivory Coast, 5 September 2004) | Ivory Coast 0 – 2 Sudan (Sudan, 16 July 1979) |
| Sweden | 3 | 2 | 0 | 1 | 3 | 3 | 0 | 8 January 2017 | Ivory Coast 2 – 1 Sweden (Friendly, 8 January 2017) | Ivory Coast 0 – 2 Sweden (Friendly, 15 January 2015) |
| Switzerland | 2 | 1 | 1 | 0 | 2 | 1 | +1 | 27 May 2006 | Ivory Coast 1 – 0 Switzerland (Friendly, 2 December 1993) | – |
| Tanzania | 5 | 3 | 1 | 1 | 8 | 4 | +4 | 16 June 2013 | Ivory Coast 4 – 2 Tanzania (Tanzania, 16 June 2013) | Ivory Coast 0 – 1 Tanzania (Tanzania, 12 December 2010) |
| Togo | 25 | 13 | 7 | 5 | 36 | 17 | +19 | 24 September 2022 | Ivory Coast 3 – 0 Togo | Ivory Coast 0 – 3 Togo (Friendly, 27 April 1975) |
| Tunisia | 19 | 8 | 6 | 5 | 30 | 26 | +4 | 26 January 2013 | Ivory Coast 3 – 0 Tunisia (South Africa, 26 January 2013) | Ivory Coast 3 – 5 Tunisia (Friendly, 27 November 1991) |
| Turkey | 1 | 0 | 1 | 0 | 1 | 1 | 0 | 11 February 2009 | – | – |
| Uganda | 6 | 3 | 2 | 1 | 10 | 5 | +5 | 22 January 2023 | Ivory Coast 3 – 0 Uganda (Friendly, 11 January 2017) | Ivory Coast 0 – 1 Uganda (Friendly, 15 June 2019) |
| Uruguay | 1 | 1 | 0 | 0 | 2 | 1 | +1 | 26 March 2024 | Ivory Coast 2 – 1 Uruguay (Friendly, 26 March 2024) | – |
| United States | 1 | 0 | 0 | 1 | 2 | 5 | –3 | 19 October 1992 | – | Ivory Coast 2 – 5 United States (Saudi Arabia, 19 October 1992) |
| Zambia | 13 | 4 | 2 | 7 | 11 | 14 | –3 | 15 November 2024 | Ivory Coast 4 – 1 Zambia (Friendly, 19 June 2019) | Ivory Coast 0 – 3 Zambia (Ivory Coast, 17 June 2023) |
| Zimbabwe | 3 | 1 | 2 | 0 | 5 | 0 | +5 | 26 December 2016 | Ivory Coast 5 – 0 Zimbabwe (Ivory Coast, 13 August 1989) | – |
| Total | 671 | 336 | 162 | 173 | 1,052 | 635 | +417 | 3 October 2026 | Ivory Coast 11 – 0 Central African Republic | Ivory Coast 0 – 5 Netherlands |

== Honours ==
=== Intercontinental ===
- Afro-Asian Cup of Nations
  - (silver) Runners-up (1): 1993

=== Continental ===
- CAF Africa Cup of Nations
  - Champions (3): 1992, 2015, 2023
  - Runners-up (2): 2006, 2012
  - Third place (4): 1965, 1968, 1986, 1994
- CAF African Nations Championship
  - Third place (1): 2016
- African Games^{1}
  - Bronze medal (1): 1965

=== Regional ===
- CEDEAO Cup
  - (gold) Champions (3): 1983, 1987, 1991
  - (silver) Runners-up (1): 1985
  - (bronze) Third place (1): 1990
- West African Nations Cup
  - (bronze) Third place (2): 1983, 1984
- UEMOA Tournament
  - (gold) Champions (2): 2007, 2008

=== Awards ===
- African National Team of the Year (3): 1992, 2015, 2024
- Africa Cup of Nations Fair Play Award (1): 2012

=== Summary ===
| Competition | 1st place, gold medalist(s) | 2nd place, silver medalist(s) | 3rd place, bronze medalist(s) | Total |
|---|---|---|---|---|
| CAF African Cup of Nations | 3 | 2 | 4 | 9 |
| CAF African Nations Championship | 0 | 0 | 1 | 1 |
| Afro-Asian Cup of Nations | 0 | 1 | 0 | 1 |
| Total | 3 | 3 | 5 | 11 |

Notes

1. Competition organized by ANOCA, officially not recognized by FIFA.

== See also ==
- Ivory Coast national under-20 football team
- Ivory Coast at the Africa Cup of Nations
