= Morocco national football team results (1990–2019) =

This article lists the results of the Morocco national football team from 1990 to 2019.

Key
Win
Draw
Defeat

== 1990s ==
=== 1990 ===
21 February 1990 Friendly	Morocco	2–1	Ivory Coast	Casablanca, Morocco
		Report		Stadium: Stade Mohammed V

9 May 1990 Friendly	Morocco	3–1	United Arab Emirates	Casablanca, Morocco
	Nader 25'; Khairi 26'; Laghrissi 31'	Report	K. Mubarak 61'	Stadium: Stade Mohammed V

9 August 1990 Friendly	Tunisia	0–0	Morocco	Tunis, Tunisia
		Report		Stadium: Stade El Menzah; Attendance: 20,000

19 August 1990 1992 AFCON Q	Morocco	2–0	Niger	Casablanca, Morocco
	Hababi 18' (pen.); Laghrissi 89'			Stadium: Stade Mohammed V Referee: Messaoud Koussa (Algeria)

2 September 1990 1992 AFCON Q	Morocco	4–0	Mauritania	Casablanca, Morocco
	Nader 9'; Bouderbala 40'; Raghib 45'; Laghrissi 89'			Stadium: Stade Mohammed V Referee: Habib Akrout (Tunisia)

12 September 1990 Friendly	Republic of Ireland	1–0	Morocco	Dublin, Republic of Ireland
	Kelly 74'	Report		Stadium: Dalymount Park; Attendance: 19,450; Referee: Frederick McKnight (Northern Ireland)

12 December 1990 Friendly	Morocco	0–0	Senegal	Casablanca, Morocco
		Report		Stadium: Stade Mohammed V Attendance: 11,000

=== 1991 ===
13 January 1991 1992 AFCON Q	Morocco	3–1	Ivory Coast	Rabat, Morocco
	Laghrissi 9', 72'; Lashaf 48'	Report	Ouattara 77'	Stadium: Stade Moulay Abdellah

27 January 1991 1992 AFCON Q	Niger	1–0	Morocco	Niamey, Niger
	Douka 19'	Report		Stadium: Stade Général-Seyni-Kountché; Attendance: 25,000; Referee: Kindner Ahmat (Chad)

27 March 1991 Friendly	Morocco	0–0	Greece	Rabat, Morocco
				Stadium: Stade Moulay Abdellah; Attendance: 10,000

3 April 1991 Friendly	Algeria	2–2	Morocco	Annaba, Algeria
	Lounici 50'; Serrar 84' (pen.)		Laghrissi 9', 46'	Stadium: Stade 19 Mai 1956; Attendance: 12,000

12 April 1991 1992 AFCON Q	Mauritania	0–2	Morocco	Nouakchott, Mauritania
		Report	Laghrissi 46'; Bouderbala 66'	Stadium: Stade Olympique; Referee: Alhagi Faye (Gambia)

28 July 1991 1992 AFCON Q	Ivory Coast	2–0	Morocco	Abidjan, Ivory Coast
	Dao 24'; Traoré 52'	Report		Stadium: Stade Félix Houphouët-Boigny; Referee: Badou Jasseh (Gambia)

4 December 1991 Friendly	Morocco	3–0	Mali	Casablanca, Morocco
	Ammouta 13'; Rokbi 26'; Dmiai 55'			Stadium: Stade Mohammed V Attendance: 12,000

26 December 1991 Friendly	Morocco	1–1	Algeria	Casablanca, Morocco
	Raghib (pen.)		Bouiche 9' (pen.)	Stadium: Stade Mohammed V Attendance: 21,500

=== 1992 ===
12 January 1992 1992 AFCON GS	Cameroon	1–0	Morocco	Dakar, Senegal
	Kana-Biyik 23'			Stadium: Stade de l'Amitié; Attendance: 60,000; Referee: Lim Kee Chong (Mauritius)

14 January 1992 1992 AFCON GS	Morocco	1–1	Zaire	Dakar, Senegal
	Rokbi 89'		Kona 90'	Stadium: Stade de l'Amitié; Attendance: 11,000; Referee: Neji Jouini (Tunisia)

18 March 1992 Friendly	Morocco	3–1	United States	Casablanca, Morocco
	Bahja 4'; Rokbi 25'; Chiba 81'		Pérez 58'	Stadium: Stade Mohammed V Attendance: 20,000

4 October 1992 1994 AFCON Q	Mali	2–1	Morocco	Bamako, Mali
	Traoré 40'; Cissé 54'		El Khalej 89'	Stadium: Stade Modibo Keïta; Referee: Idrissa Sarr (Mauritania)

11 October 1992 1994 WCQ	Morocco	5–0; Suspended at 51' (Note: The Morocco–Ethiopia match was suspended after 51 minutes due to Ethiopia being reduced to seven players. The result was affirmed.)	Ethiopia	Casablanca, Morocco
	Chaouch 2', 29'; Rokbi 14'; Lashaf 40'; Samadi 50'			Stadium: Stade Mohammed V Attendance: 6,820; Referee: Rachid Medjiba Algeria

25 October 1992 1994 WCQ	Benin	0–1	Morocco	Cotonou, Benin
			Daoudi 49'	Stadium: Stade de l'Amitié; Attendance: 7,000; Referee: Oi Attikora (Ivory Coast)

8 November 1992 1994 AFCON Q	Morocco	0–0	Egypt	Casablanca, Morocco
				Stadium: Stade Mohammed V

20 December 1992 1994 WCQ	Tunisia	1–1	Morocco	Tunis, Tunisia
	F. Rouissi 44'		Bouyboud 85'	Stadium: Stade El Menzah; Attendance: 36,950; Referee: Michel Piraux (Belgium)

=== 1993 ===
17 January 1993 1994 WCQ	Ethiopia	0–1	Morocco	Addis Ababa, Ethiopia
			Fertout 33'	Stadium: Addis Ababa Stadium; Attendance: 12,757; Referee: Martin Bita Omondi (Kenya)

31 January 1993 1994 WCQ	Morocco	5–0	Benin	Rabat, Morocco
	Chaouch 2', 17'; El Khalej 42'; Abrami 60' (pen.); Meziane 72'			Stadium: Prince Moulay Abdellah Stadium; Attendance: 9,602; Referee: Cherif Boubacar Mbaye (Senegal)

28 February 1993 1994 WCQ	Morocco	0–0	Tunisia	Casablanca, Morocco
				Stadium: Stade Mohammed V Attendance: 60,000; Referee: Leslie Mottram (Scotland)

11 April 1993 1994 AFCON Q	Morocco	0–1	Malawi	Rabat, Morocco
			Waya 89'	Stadium: Stade Moulay Abdellah

18 April 1993 1994 WCQ	Morocco	1–0	Senegal	Casablanca, Morocco
	Chaouch 82'			Stadium: Stade Mohammed V Attendance: 75,000; Referee: Alhagi Faye (Gambia)

25 April 1993 1994 AFCON Q	Morocco	1–0	Mali	Casablanca, Morocco
	Fertout 76'			Stadium: Stade Mohammed V

4 July 1993 1994 WCQ	Zambia	2–1	Morocco	Lusaka, Zambia
	K. Bwalya 60'; J. Bwalya 67'		Daoudi 1'	Stadium: Independence Stadium; Attendance: 50,000; Referee: Hafidh Ali Tahir (Tanzania)

11 July 1993 1994 AFCON Q	Egypt	1–1	Morocco	Alexandria, Egypt
	Ezzat 67'		Laghrissi 22'	Stadium: Alexandria Stadium

17 July 1993 1994 WCQ	Senegal	1–3	Morocco	Dakar, Senegal
	Sané 65'		Bouyboud 8', 62'; Fertout 75'	Stadium: Stade Leopold Senghor; Attendance: 43,412; Referee: Neji Jouini (Tunisia)

25 July 1993 1994 AFCON Q	Malawi	0–2	Morocco	Lilongwe, Malawi
			Sabek 33' (pen.); Rokbi 75'	Stadium: Silver Stadium

15 September 1993 Friendly	Morocco	3–0	Mali	Casablanca, Morocco
	Laghrissi 25', 55'; Chaouch 37'			Stadium: Stade Mohammed V Attendance: 8,000

22 September 1993 Friendly	Morocco	0–0	Algeria	Casablanca, Morocco
				Stadium: Stade Mohammed V Attendance: 12,000

27 September 1993 Friendly	Morocco	1–0	Gabon	Bonneuil-sur-Marne, France
	Daoudi 58'			Attendance: 1,500

10 October 1993 1994 WCQ	Morocco	1–0	Zambia	Casablanca, Morocco
	Laghrissi 62'			Stadium: Stade Mohammed V Attendance: 49,383; Referee: Jean-Fidèle Diramba (Gabon)

=== 1994 ===
2 February 1994 1994 UAE Friendly Tournament	Egypt	1–1	Morocco	Sharjah, United Arab Emirates
	H.Hassan 67' (pen.)		Daoudi 45' (pen.)	Referee: Salem Saeed Binhazim (United Arab Emirates)

4 February 1994 1994 UAE Friendly Tournament	United Arab Emirates	1–1	Morocco	Sharjah, United Arab Emirates
	Sultan 70'		Fertout 73'	Referee: Ahmed Jassim Mohamed

6 February 1994 1994 UAE Friendly Tournament	Morocco	2–1	Slovakia	Sharjah, United Arab Emirates
	Fertout 23'; El Hadrioui 87'		Faktor 27'	Attendance: 8,000; Referee: Xuezhi Wang (China)

23 February 1994 Friendly	Morocco	0–0	Finland	Casablanca, Morocco
				Stadium: Stade Mohammed V Attendance: 12,000; Referee: Abdelaziz Belleftouh

23 March 1994 Friendly	Luxembourg	1–2	Morocco	Luxembourg City, Luxembourg
	Wolf 72'		Hababi 5'; El Hadrioui 89'	Stadium: Stade Josy Barthel; Attendance: 5,500; Referee: Didier Pauchard (France)

20 April 1994 1994 Salta Cup	Argentina	3–1	Morocco	Salta, Argentina
	Balbo 13'; Maradona 55' (pen.); Pérez 81'		Chaouch 63'	Stadium: Estadio El Gigante del Norte; Attendance: 25,000; Referee: Oscar Velásquez Alvarenga (Paraguay)

1 June 1994 Friendly	Canada	1–1	Morocco	Montreal, Canada
	Doliscat 89'		Chaouch 58'	Stadium: Complexe Sportif Claude-Robillard; Attendance: 3,816

19 June 1994 1994 FIFA World Cup GS	Belgium	1–0	Morocco	Orlando, United States
12:30 UTC−4	Degryse 11'			Stadium: Citrus Bowl; Attendance: 61,219; Referee: José Torres Cadena (Colombia)

25 June 1994 1994 FIFA World Cup GS	Saudi Arabia	2–1	Morocco	East Rutherford, United States
19:30 UTC−4	Al-Jaber 7' (pen.); Anwar 45'		Chaouch 26'	Stadium: Giants Stadium; Attendance: 76,322; Referee: Philip Don (England)

29 June 1994 1994 FIFA World Cup GS	Morocco	1–2	Netherlands	Orlando, United States
12:30 UTC−2	Nader 47'		Bergkamp 43'; Roy 77'	Stadium: Citrus Bowl; Attendance: 60,578; Referee: Alberto Tejada Noriega (Peru)

4 September 1994 1996 AFCON Q	Burkina Faso	2–1	Morocco	Ouagadougou, Burkina Faso
	Ouédraogo 49'; Ouattara 68'		El-Khalej 32'	Stadium: Stade du 4 Août; Referee: Idrissa Sarr (Mauritania)

7 November 1994 Friendly	Morocco	1–1	Cameroon	Casablanca, Morocco
	Loumari 80'		Ntone 80'	Stadium: Stade Mohammed V Attendance: 6,000

13 November 1994 1996 AFCON Q	Morocco	1–0	Ivory Coast	Casablanca, Morocco
	Nader 15'			Stadium: Stade Mohammed V Attendance: 12,000

=== 1995 ===
1 March 1995 Friendly	Morocco	2–0	Senegal	Casablanca, Morocco
	Derrouiche 5', 26'			Stadium: Stade Mohammed V Attendance: 30,000

9 April 1995 1996 AFCON Q	Morocco	0–0	Burkina Faso	Rabat, Morocco
				Stadium: Prince Moulay Abdellah Stadium; Attendance: 45,000

17 May 1995 Friendly	Morocco	0–0	Egypt	Marrakesh, Morocco
				Stadium: Stade El Harti; Attendance: 8,000

4 June 1995 1996 AFCON Q	Ivory Coast	2–0	Morocco	Abidjan, Ivory Coast
	Tiéhi 19'; Bamba 65'			Stadium: Stade Félix Houphouët-Boigny; Attendance: 45,000; Referee: Sidi Magassa (Mali)

15 November 1995 Friendly	Morocco	2–0	Mali	Rabat, Morocco
	Fahmi 9'; Hadji 60'			Stadium: Stade Moulay Abdellah; Attendance: 20,000

=== 1996 ===
3 January 1996 Friendly	Morocco	3–1	Tunisia	Rabat, Morocco
	Fertout 3'; Bassir 20'; Camacho 70'	Report	Baya 43'	Stadium: Stade Moulay Abdellah

17 January 1996 Friendly	Morocco	6–0	Armenia	Vitrolles, France
	Hababi 5', 37'; Bassir 31'; Khalfi 39'; Camacho 82'; Sellami 85'			Stadium: Stade Jules Ladoumègue; Attendance: 400; Referee: Marc Batta (France)

7 February 1996 Friendly	Morocco	2–0	Luxembourg	Rabat, Morocco
	Sellami 36'; Camacho 79'	Report		Stadium: Stade Moulay Abdellah; Attendance: 20,000

20 March 1996 1996 UAE Friendly Tournament	Morocco	2–0	Egypt	Dubai, United Arab Emirates
	El Hadrioui 9'; Benmahmoud 80'	Report		Stadium: Al Maktoum Stadium; Attendance: 12,000

23 March 1996 1996 UAE Friendly Tournament	Morocco	2–2	South Korea	Dubai, United Arab Emirates
	Fahmi 35'; Nazir 37'	Report	Ko 23'; Roh 61'	Stadium: Al Maktoum Stadium; Attendance: 12,000

26 March 1996 1996 UAE Friendly Tournament	United Arab Emirates	1–0	Morocco	Dubai, United Arab Emirates
	Bakheet 24'	Report		Stadium: Al Maktoum Stadium; Attendance: 12,000

29 August 1996 Friendly	Morocco	7–0	Zaire	Settat, Morocco
	Hadji 22'; Fertout 24', 32', 90'; Nader 36'; Raghib 70'; Abrami 72' (pen.)			Attendance: 10,000

4 October 1996 1998 AFCON Q	Egypt	1–1	Morocco	Cairo, Egypt
	H.Hassan 88'		Bassir 74'	Stadium: Cairo International Stadium; Attendance: 50,000

9 November 1996 1998 WCQ	Morocco	4–0	Sierra Leone	Rabat, Morocco
18:00 UTC+0	Hababi 16'; Raghib 50', 55'; Fertout 57'			Stadium: Prince Moulay Abdellah Stadium; Attendance: 25,000; Referee: Olufemi Olaniyan (Nigeria)

11 December 1996 1996 Hassan II Cup	Morocco	2–2 (6–7 p)	Croatia	Casablanca, Morocco
	Bassir 22'; Bahja 72'		Vlaović 14', 15'	Stadium: Mohamed V Stadium; Attendance: 80,000

12 December 1996 1996 Hassan II Cup	Morocco	2–0	Nigeria	Casablanca, Morocco
	Bassir 49'; Jrindou 90'			Stadium: Mohamed V Stadium; Attendance: 75,000; Referee: Falla Ndoye (Senegal)

=== 1997 ===
12 January 1997 1998 WCQ	Ghana	2–2	Morocco	Kumasi, Ghana
14:45 UTC+1	Johnson 77'; Moses 89'		Bassir 30'; Hadji 70'	Stadium: Baba Yara Stadium; Attendance: 45,000; Referee: Ali Mohamed Bujsaim (United Arab Emirates)

22 February 1997 1998 AFCON Q	Senegal	0–0	Morocco	Dakar, Senegal
				Stadium: Stade Léopold Sédar Senghor; Attendance: 30,000; Referee: Mohamed Kouradji (Algeria)

6 April 1997 1998 WCQ	Gabon	0–4; Match abandoned (Note: Match abandoned after 53 minutes due to crowd trouble. FIFA allowed the result to stand.)	Morocco	Libreville, Gabon
16:00 UTC+1			Bahja 2', 5'; Bassir 44', 45'	Stadium: Stade Omar Bongo; Attendance: 40,000; Referee: Charles Masembe (Uganda)

26 April 1997 1998 WCQ	Sierra Leone	0–1	Morocco	Freetown, Sierra Leone
16:30 UTC+1			Bassir 40'	Stadium: National Stadium; Attendance: 45,000; Referee: Falla N'Doye (Senegal)

31 May 1997 1998 AFCON Q	Morocco	4–0	Ethiopia	Rabat, Morocco
	Chiba 8'; Bahja 18'; Naybet 34'; El Hadrioui 81'			Stadium: Prince Moulay Abdellah Stadium; Attendance: 30,000; Referee: Mahmoud Hosni (Tunisia)

8 June 1997 1998 WCQ	Morocco	1–0	Ghana	Casablanca, Morocco
20:00 UTC+0	Raghib 67'			Stadium: Stade Mohammed V Attendance: 80,000; Referee: Sidi Magassa (Mali)

21 June 1997 1998 AFCON Q	Morocco	1–0	Egypt	Rabat, Morocco
	Bassir 71'			Stadium: Prince Moulay Abdellah Stadium; Attendance: 60,000; Referee: Sidi Bekaye Magassa (Mali)

13 July 1997 1998 AFCON Q	Ethiopia	0–1	Morocco	Addis Ababa, Ethiopia
			Bassir 21'	Stadium: Addis Ababa Stadium; Attendance: 20,000

27 July 1997 1998 AFCON Q	Morocco	3–0	Senegal	Rabat, Morocco
	Bassir 11', 67'; Chiba 40'			Stadium: Prince Moulay Abdellah Stadium; Attendance: 20,000; Referee: Mamadouba Camara (Guinea)

16 August 1997 1998 WCQ	Morocco	2–0	Gabon	Casablanca, Morocco
20:00 UTC+0	Naybet 24'; Bahja 40' (pen.)			Stadium: Stade Mohammed V Attendance: 25,000; Referee: Hussein Moussa (Egypt)

9 October 1997 Friendly	Brazil	2–0	Morocco	Belém, Brazil
	Denílson 80', 88' (pen.)			Stadium: Estádio Olímpico do Pará; Attendance: 45,000

26 November 1997 Friendly	Morocco	3–0	Togo	Rabat, Morocco
	Abrami 56' (pen.); Camacho 72'; Ouakili 88'			Stadium: Stade Moulay Abdellah

=== 1998 ===
14 January 1998 Friendly	Morocco	2–1	Angola	Rabat, Morocco
	Ouakili; Hadji		Goal	Stadium: Stade Moulay Abdellah

6 February 1998 Friendly	Morocco	3–0	Niger	Marrakesh, Morocco
	Bassir 15'; Chippo 18'; Bahja 59' (pen.)			Stadium: Stade El Harti

9 February 1998 1998 AFCON GS	Morocco	1–1	Zambia	Bobo-Dioulasso, Burkina Faso
18:15 UTC+2	Bahja 37'		Chilumba 87'	Stadium: Stade Municipal; Attendance: 10,000; Referee: Abdul Rahman Al-Zeid (Saudi Arabia)

13 February 1998 1998 AFCON GS	Morocco	3–0	Mozambique	Bobo-Dioulasso, Burkina Faso
20:00 UTC+2	Chiba 39'; El Khattabi 40'; Fertout 82'			Stadium: Stade Municipal; Attendance: 3,000; Referee: Lucien Bouchardeau (Niger)

17 February 1998 1998 AFCON GS	Morocco	1–0	Egypt	Ouagadougou, Burkina Faso
16:00 UTC+2	Hadji 90'			Stadium: Stade Municipal; Attendance: 500; Referee: Kim Milton Nielsen (Denmark)

22 February 1998 1998 AFCON QF	Morocco	1–2	South Africa	Ouagadougou, Burkina Faso
16:00 UTC+2	Chiba 36'		McCarthy 22'; Nyathi 79'	Stadium: Stade Municipal; Attendance: 2,000; Referee: Lucien Bouchardeau (Niger)

21 April 1998 Friendly	Bulgaria	2–1	Morocco	Sofia, Bulgaria
	Penev 10' (pen.); Stoilov 78'		Bassir 83'	Stadium: Vasil Levski National Stadium

27 May 1998 1998 Hassan II Cup	Morocco	0–1	England	Casablanca, Morocco
17:30 UTC+1			Owen 59'	Stadium: Stade Mohammed V Attendance: 80 000; Referee: Mourad Daami (Tunisia)

29 May 1998 1998 Hassan II Cup	Morocco	2–2 (6–5 p)	France	Casablanca, Morocco
	Bassir 9', 64'		Blanc 24'; Djorkaeff 74'	Stadium: Stade Mohammed V Attendance: 65 000; Referee: Idrissa Seck (Senegal)
	Penalties
	Ouakili (penalty scored); Triki (penalty scored); Saber (penalty scored); Abrami (penalty missed); Hadda (penalty scored); Amzine (penalty scored); Rossi (penalty scored)		(penalty scored) Blanc; (penalty missed) Djorkaeff; (penalty scored) Leboeuf; (penalty scored) Trezeguet; (penalty scored) Pires; (penalty scored) Vieira; (penalty missed) Candela

4 June 1998 Friendly	Morocco	1–1	Chile	Avignon, France
	Hadji 46'		Salas 88'	Stadium: Parc des Sports; Attendance: 6,000; Referee: Bernard Saules (France)

10 June 1998 1998 FIFA World Cup GS	Morocco	2–2	Norway	Montpellier, France
21:00	Hadji 37'; Camacho 60'		Chippo 45+1' (o.g.); Eggen 61'	Stadium: Stade de la Mosson; Attendance: 29,800; Referee: Pirom Un-prasert (Thailand)

16 June 1998 1998 FIFA World Cup GS	Brazil	3–0	Morocco	Nantes, France
21:00	Ronaldo 9'; Rivaldo 45+2'; Bebeto 50'			Stadium: Stade de la Beaujoire; Attendance: 35,500; Referee: Nikolai Levnikov (Russia)

23 June 1998 1998 FIFA World Cup GS	Scotland	0–3	Morocco	Saint-Étienne, France
21:00			Bassir 23', 85'; Camacho 46'	Stadium: Stade Geoffroy-Guichard; Attendance: 30,600; Referee: Ali Bujsaim (United Arab Emirates)

2 September 1998 Friendly	Morocco	2–0	Senegal	Tanger, Morocco
	Chiba 30'; Bassir 74'			Stadium: Stade de Marchan; Attendance: 10,000

4 October 1998 2000 AFCON Q	Morocco	3–0; Annulled (Note: Sierra Leone withdrew after one game due to the Sierra Leone Civil War on 22 March 1999, their result was annulled.)	Sierra Leone	Casablanca, Morocco
	Chippo 22'; Bassir 42'; Camacho 82'			Stadium: Stade Mohammed V Attendance: 25,000; Referee: Djibril M'Baye (Senegal)

22 December 1998 Friendly	Morocco	4–1	Bulgaria	Agadir, Morocco
	Naybet 30'; Camacho 44'; Bassir 61'; Ramzi 74'		Bachev 56'	Stadium: Stade Al Inbiaâte

=== 1999 ===
19 January 1999 Friendly	France	1–0	Morocco	Marseille, France
	Djorkaeff 30'			Stadium: Stade Vélodrome; Attendance: 55,000; Referee: Alain Hamer (Luxembourg)

24 January 1999 2000 AFCON Q	Guinea	1–1	Morocco	Conakry, Guinea
	Oularé 30'		Hadji 46'	Stadium: Stade du 28 Septembre; Attendance: 18,000; Referee: Zeli Sinko (Ivory Coast)

28 February 1999 2000 AFCON Q	Togo	2–3	Morocco	Lomé, Togo
	Noutsoudje 32'; Goumai 63'		Camacho 2', 72'; Hadji 39'	Stadium: Stade Municipal; Attendance: 15,000; Referee: Alex Quartey (Ghana)

11 April 1999 2000 AFCON Q	Morocco	1–1	Togo	Rabat, Morocco
	Chippo 40'		Oyawolé 67'	Stadium: Prince Moulay Abdellah Stadium; Attendance: 50,000; Referee: Mohsen Boukhir (Tunisia)

27 April 1999 Friendly	Netherlands	1–2	Morocco	Arnhem, Netherlands
	van Nistelrooy 90'		Hadji 59'; Bassir 69'	Stadium: GelreDome

6 June 1999 2000 AFCON Q	Morocco	1–0	Guinea	Rabat, Morocco
	Camacho 6'			Stadium: Prince Moulay Abdellah Stadium; Referee: Boucif Lazzouni

6 September 1999 Friendly	Belgium	4–0	Morocco	Liège, Belgium
	Staelens 9' (pen.); Walem 18'; Mpenza 20'; Strupar 88'			Stadium: Stade Maurice Dufrasne

17 November 1999 Friendly	Morocco	2–1	United States	Marrakesh, Morocco
	Ramzi 18'; Hadji 27' (pen.)		Wynalda 17'	Stadium: Stade El Harti; Attendance: 18,000

21 December 1999 Friendly	Morocco	0–0	Senegal	Agadir, Morocco
				Stadium: Al Inbiâate Stadium

== 2000s ==
=== 2000 ===
18 January 2000 Friendly	Morocco	1–0	Trinidad and Tobago	El Jadida, Morocco
	Hadji 34'			Stadium: Stade El Abdi; Attendance: 10,000

26 January 2000 2000 AFCON GS	Morocco	1–0	Congo	Lagos, Nigeria
19:30 UTC+1	Bassir 85'			Stadium: National Stadium; Attendance: 8,000; Referee: Alain Sars (France)

29 January 2000 2000 AFCON GS	Morocco	0–0	Tunisia	Lagos, Nigeria
16:00 UTC+1				Stadium: National Stadium; Attendance: 5,000; Referee: Falla Ndoye (Senegal)

3 February 2000 2000 AFCON GS	Nigeria	2–0	Morocco	Lagos, Nigeria
	George 28'; Aghahowa 81'			Stadium: National Stadium; Attendance: 60,000; Referee: Coffi Codjia (Benin)

9 April 2000 2002 WCQ	Gambia	0–1	Morocco	Bakau, Gambia
16:00 UTC+0			El Moubarki 63'	Stadium: Independence Stadium; Attendance: 20,000; Referee: Mamadouba Camara (Guinea)

22 April 2000 2002 WCQ	Morocco	2–0	Gambia	Casablanca, Morocco
19:30 UTC+0	El Khattari 17', 31'			Stadium: Stade Mohammed V Attendance: 10,800; Referee: Alhabib Ahmad (Libya)

4 June 2000 2000 Hassan II Cup	Morocco	1–0	Jamaica	Casablanca, Morocco
	Zerouali 61'			Stadium: Stade Mohammed V Attendance: 40,000

6 June 2000 2000 Hassan II Cup	Morocco	1–5	France	Casablanca, Morocco
	Naybet 65'		Henry 27'; Djorkaeff 56'; Dugarry 79'; Anelka 83'; Wiltord 90+2'	Stadium: Stade Mohammed V

17 June 2000 2002 WCQ	Namibia	0–0	Morocco	Windhoek, Namibia
15:00 UTC+1				Stadium: Sam Nujoma Stadium; Attendance: 5,000; Referee: Edwin Senai (Botswana)

9 July 2000 2002 WCQ	Morocco	2–1	Algeria	Fez, Morocco
20:00 UTC+0	Camacho 51', 75'		Meçabih 35'	Stadium: Stade Hassan II; Attendance: 10,000; Referee: Ferid Sahli (Tunisia)

2 September 2000 2002 AFCON Q	Gabon	2–0	Morocco	Libreville, Gabon
	Nzeng 38'; Bito'o 56'			Stadium: Stade Omar Bongo; Attendance: 4,000; Referee: Sidi Bekaye Magassa (Mali)

8 October 2000 2002 AFCON Q	Morocco	1–0	Kenya	Casablanca, Morocco
	Chippo 43'			Stadium: Stade Mohammed V Referee: Alex Quartey (Ghana)

22 November 2000 Friendly	Morocco	0–0	Libya	Casablanca, Morocco
				Stadium: Stade Mohammed V Attendance: 6,000

=== 2001 ===
13 January 2001 2002 AFCON Q	Tunisia	0–1	Morocco	Tunis, Tunisia
			Camacho 49'	Stadium: Stade El Menzah; Attendance: 35,000

28 January 2001 2002 WCQ	Egypt	0–0	Morocco	Cairo, Egypt
18:00 UTC+2				Stadium: Cairo International Stadium; Attendance: 60,000

8 February 2001 2001 UAE Friendly Tournament	Morocco	1–1	South Korea	Dubai, United Arab Emirates
	El Assas 10'		Yoo 88'

11 February 2001 2001 UAE Friendly Tournament	Morocco	4–2	Denmark	Dubai, United Arab Emirates
	Bassir 4', 68'; Daoudi 44'; El Moubarki 81'		Fernandez 29'; Sand 77'

14 February 2001 2001 UAE Friendly Tournament	United Arab Emirates	1–1	Morocco	Dubai, United Arab Emirates
	Juma 34'		Sektioui 75'

24 February 2001 2002 WCQ	Morocco	0–0	Senegal	Rabat, Morocco
				Stadium: Stade Moulay Abdellah; Attendance: 60,000

3 March 2001 Friendly	Morocco	1–0	Trinidad and Tobago	Casablanca, Morocco
	Hadji 34'			Stadium: Stade Mohammed V

24 March 2001 2002 AFCON Q	Morocco	2–0	Tunisia	Rabat, Morocco
	Chippo 20'; Camacho 60'			Stadium: Stade Moulay Abdellah; Attendance: 25,000

21 April 2001 2002 WCQ	Morocco	3–0	Namibia	Rabat, Morocco
	Rokki 49'; Camacho 75', 90'			Stadium: Stade Moulay Abdellah; Attendance: 15,000

4 May 2001 2002 WCQ	Algeria	1–2	Morocco	Algiers, Algeria
	Tasfaout 10'		Benmahmoud 17'; Amzine 46'	Stadium: Stade 5 Juillet 1962; Attendance: 15,000

2 June 2001 2002 AFCON Q	Kenya	1–1	Morocco	Nairobi, Kenya
	Origi 5'		Bassir 43'	Stadium: Moi International Sports Centre; Attendance: 17,000

16 June 2001 2002 AFCON Q	Morocco	0–1	Gabon	Fez, Morocco
			Nguema 43'	Stadium: Stade Hassan II; Attendance: 12,000

30 June 2001 2002 WCQ	Morocco	1–0	Egypt	Rabat, Morocco
	Hadji 32'			Stadium: Stade Moulay Abdellah; Attendance: 45,000

14 July 2001 2002 WCQ	Senegal	1–0	Morocco	Dakar, Senegal
	Diouf 17'			Stadium: Stade Leopold Senghor; Attendance: 60,000

5 September 2001 Friendly	Italy	1–0	Morocco	Piacenza, Italy
	Tommasi 18'			Stadium: Stadio Leonardo Garilli; Attendance: 18,741

14 October 2001 Bamako Tournament	Mali	2–1	Morocco	Bamako, Mali
	Doukantie 9'; Bagayoko 15'		Rokki 35'	Stadium: Stade 26 Mars

14 November 2001 Friendly	Morocco	1–0	Zambia	Rabat, Morocco
	Rokki 86'			Stadium: Stade Moulay Abdellah

12 December 2001 Friendly	Morocco	1–1	Mali	Settat, Morocco
	Chippo 9' (pen.)		Bakayoko 86'

=== 2002 ===
13 January 2002 Friendly	Morocco	2–1	Guinea	Rabat, Morocco
	Camacho 10'; Ramzi 50'		Titi Camara 13'	Stadium: Stade Moulay Abdellah

16 January 2002 Friendly	Gambia	0–2	Morocco	Bakau, Gambia
		Report	Ramzi 15'; Camacho 28'	Stadium: Independence Stadium

21 January 2002 2002 AFCON GS	Morocco	0–0	Ghana	Ségou, Mali
16:00				Stadium: Stade Amare Daou; Attendance: 4,000; Referee: Domenico Messina (Italy)

26 January 2002 2002 AFCON GS	Burkina Faso	1–2	Morocco	Ségou, Mali
15:30	Dagano 58'		Zerouali 23', 85'	Stadium: Stade Amare Daou; Attendance: 6,000; Referee: Lim Kee Chong (Mauritius)

30 January 2002 2002 AFCON GS	South Africa	3–1	Morocco	Ségou, Mali
	Zuma 42'; Mngomeni 48'; Nomvethe 51'		Benmahmoud 77' (pen.)	Stadium: Stade Amare Daou; Attendance: 3,000; Referee: Gamal Al-Ghandour (Egypt)

27 March 2002 Friendly	Costa Rica	0–1	Morocco	San José, Costa Rica
		Report	Bouden	Stadium: Estadio Ricardo Saprissa

21 August 2002 Friendly	Luxembourg	0–2	Morocco	Luxembourg City, Luxembourg
		Report	Jabrane 71'; Kacemi 85'	Stadium: Stade Josy Barthel; Attendance: 1,650

7 September 2002 2004 AFCON Q	Gabon	0–1	Morocco	Libreville, Gabon
			Chippo 19'	Stadium: Stade Omar Bongo; Attendance: 30,000; Referee: Raphaël Evehe Divine (Cameroon)

3 October 2002 Friendly	Morocco	6–1	Niger	Rabat, Morocco
	Bidoudane 9'; Bouden 29'; El Assas 50'; Jabrane 70'; Hassi 78'; Rokki 83'	Report	Hamidou 90'	Stadium: Stade Moulay Abdellah; Attendance: 4,300

13 October 2002 2004 AFCON Q	Morocco	5–0	Equatorial Guinea	Rabat, Morocco
	Ramzi 8'; Bidoudane 24'; Safri 27'; Rokki 45'; Kacemi 70'			Stadium: Moulay Abdellah Stadium; Attendance: 25,000; Referee: Mohsen Boukhtir (Guinea)

20 November 2002 Mandela Challenge	Morocco	1–3	Mali	Rabat, Morocco
	Rokki 5'		Sidibe 56'; Coulibaly 80', 90'	Stadium: Stade Moulay Abdellah; Attendance: 15,000

=== 2003 ===
12 February 2003 Friendly	Morocco	1–0	Senegal	Paris, France
	Saber 63'			Stadium: Stade Charléty; Attendance: 8,000

29 March 2003 2004 AFCON Q	Sierra Leone	0–0	Morocco	Freetown, Sierra Leone
		Report		Stadium: National Stadium; Referee: Idrissa Kaba (Liberia)

30 April 2003 Friendly	Morocco	0–1	Ivory Coast	Rabat, Morocco
			Kalou 83' (pen.)	Stadium: Stade Moulay Abdellah

8 June 2003 2004 AFCON Q	Morocco	1–0	Sierra Leone	Casablanca, Morocco
	Chippo 25'	Report		Stadium: Stade Mohammed V Referee: Abdul El-Fatah Esam Eldeen (Egypt)

20 June 2003 2004 AFCON Q	Morocco	2–0	Gabon	Rabat, Morocco
	Moha 22'; Zairi 75'	Report		Stadium: Stade Moulay Abdellah; Referee: Mohamed Abdelhakim Al-Shelmani (Libya)

6 July 2003 2004 AFCON Q	Equatorial Guinea	0–1	Morocco	Malabo, Equatorial Guinea
		Report	Akaddar 60'	Stadium: Estadio de Malabo

10 September 2003 Friendly	Morocco	2–0	Trinidad and Tobago	Marrakesh, Morocco
	Chamakh 38', 49'	Report		Stadium: Stade El Harti; Attendance: 10,000

11 October 2003 Friendly	Tunisia	0–0	Morocco	Tunis, Tunisia
		Report		Stadium: Stade El Menzah; Attendance: 13,000

15 November 2003 Friendly	Morocco	1–0	Burkina Faso	Meknes, Morocco
	Ouaddou 24'	Report		Stadium: Stade d'Honneur; Attendance: 25,000

19 November 2003 Friendly	Morocco	0–2	Mali	Casablanca, Morocco
			Coulibaly 24'; Sidibe 50'	Stadium: Stade Mohammed V Attendance: 6,000

=== 2004 ===
27 January 2004 2004 AFCON GS	Nigeria	0–1	Morocco	Monastir, Tunisia
14:00 GMT+1			Hadji 77'	Stadium: Stade Mustapha Ben Jannet; Attendance: 15,000; Referee: Falla N'Doye (Senegal)

31 January 2004 2004 AFCON GS	Morocco	4–0	Benin	Sfax, Tunisia
18:00 GMT+1	Chamakh 17'; Mokhtari 73'; Ouaddou 75'; El Karkouri 80'			Stadium: Stade Taïeb El Mhiri; Attendance: 20,000; Referee: Eddy Maillet (Seychelles)

4 February 2004 2004 AFCON GS	Morocco	1–1	South Africa	Sousse, Tunisia
18:00 GMT+1	Safri 38' (pen.)		Mayo 29'	Stadium: Stade Olympique de Sousse; Attendance: 6,000; Referee: Hichem Guirat (Tunisia)

8 February 2004 2004 AFCON QF	Morocco	3–1 (a.e.t.)	Algeria	Sfax, Tunisia
17:00 GMT+1	Chamakh 90'; Hadji 113'; Zairi 120'		Cherrad 84'	Stadium: Stade Taïeb El Mhiri; Attendance: 22,000

11 February 2004 2004 AFCON SF	Morocco	4–0	Mali	Sousse, Tunisia
19:00 GMT+1	Mokhtari 44', 58'; Hadji 80'; Baha 90+1'			Stadium: Stade Olympique de Sousse; Attendance: 15,000; Referee: Abubakar Sharaf (Ivory Coast)

14 February 2004 2004 AFCON Final	Tunisia	2–1	Morocco	Radès, Tunisia
14:30 GMT+1	Santos 5'; Jaziri 52'		Mokhtari 38'	Stadium: Stade 7 Novembre; Attendance: 60,000; Referee: Falla N'Doye (Senegal)

18 February 2004 Friendly	Morocco	2–1	Switzerland	Rabat, Morocco
	Ajeddou 79'; Aiajour 82'		Frei 90'	Stadium: Stade Moulay Abdellah

31 March 2004 Friendly	Morocco	3–1	Angola	Rabat, Morocco
	Baha 67', 74'; Zairi 77'		Norberto 84'	Stadium: Stade Moulay Abdellah; Attendance: 20,000

28 April 2004 Friendly	Morocco	0–1	Argentina	Casablanca, Morocco
			González 52'	Stadium: Stade Mohammed V Attendance: 60,000

28 May 2004 Friendly	Mali	0–0	Morocco	Bamako, Mali
				Stadium: Stade 26 Mars; Attendance: 35,000

5 June 2004 2006 WCQ / AFCON Q	Malawi	1–1	Morocco	Blantyre, Malawi
	Munthali 35'		Safri 25'	Stadium: Kamuzu Stadium; Attendance: 30,040; Referee: Joseph Mususa (Zimbabwe)

3 July 2004 2006 WCQ / AFCON Q	Botswana	0–1	Morocco	Gaborone, Botswana
			Mokhtari 30'	Stadium: Botswana National Stadium; Attendance: 22,000; Referee: Gilbert Dlamini (Swaziland)

4 September 2004 2006 WCQ / AFCON Q	Morocco	1–1	Tunisia	Rabat, Morocco
	El Karkouri 74'		Santos 11'	Stadium: Stade Moulay Abdellah; Attendance: 45,000; Referee: Ahmed Auda (Egypt)

10 October 2004 2006 WCQ / AFCON Q	Guinea	1–1	Morocco	Conakry, Guinea
	Mansaré 50'	Report	Chamakh 5'	Stadium: Stade 28 Septembre; Attendance: 25,000; Referee: Manuel Monteiro Duarte (Cape Verde)

17 November 2004 Friendly	Morocco	4–0	Burkina Faso	Rabat, Morocco
	Oulmers 52'; Boukhari 68'; Sarsar 80'; Abdessadki 82'			Stadium: Stade Moulay Abdellah; Attendance: 5,000

=== 2005 ===
9 February 2005 2006 WCQ / AFCON Q	Morocco	5–1	Kenya	Rabat, Morocco
19:30	Zairi 12', 39', 90'; Diane 46'; Hadji 81'		Otieno 90+3'	Stadium: Stade Moulay Abdellah; Attendance: 40,000; Referee: Wahid Tamuni (Libya)

26 March 2005 2006 WCQ / AFCON Q	Morocco	1–0	Guinea	Rabat, Morocco
19:30	Hadji 62'			Stadium: Stade Moulay Abdellah; Attendance: 70,000; Referee: Koman Coulibaly (Mali)

4 June 2005 2006 WCQ / AFCON Q	Morocco	4–1	Malawi	Rabat, Morocco
20:00	Safri 16' (pen.); Hadji 21', 75'; Kharja 72'	Report	Chipatala 10'	Stadium: Stade Moulay Abdellah; Referee: Buenkadila Wabelo Bisingu (Congo DR)
Note: Some sources incorrectly list the scorer of the first Morocco goal as Marouane Chamakh, who won the penalty that was converted by Safri.

18 June 2005 2006 WCQ / AFCON Q	Kenya	0–0	Morocco	Nairobi, Kenya
16:00				Stadium: Nyayo National Stadium; Attendance: 50,000; Referee: Badara Diatta (Senegal)

17 August 2005 Friendly	Morocco	0–1	Togo	Rouen, France
			Dogbé 20'	Stadium: Stade Robert Diochon

3 September 2005 2006 WCQ / AFCON Q	Morocco	1–0	Botswana	Rabat, Morocco
20:00	El Karkouri 62'			Stadium: Stade Moulay Abdellah; Attendance: 25,000; Referee: Mohamed Benouza (Algeria)

8 October 2005 2006 WCQ / AFCON Q	Tunisia	2–2	Morocco	Radès, Tunisia
20:45	Clayton 18' (pen.); El Karkouri 69' (o.g.)		Chamakh 3'; El Karkouri 42'	Stadium: Stade 7 November; Attendance: 60,000; Referee: Essam Abdel-Fatah (Egypt)

15 November 2005 Friendly	Morocco	0–0	Cameroon	Clairefontaine-en-Yvelines, France
				Stadium: INF Clairefontaine

=== 2006 ===
9 January 2006 Friendly	Morocco	3–0	DR Congo	Rabat, Morocco
	Chamakh 32'; Aboucherouane 52'; Armoumen 77'			Stadium: Stade Moulay Abdellah

14 January 2006 Friendly	Morocco	1–0	Zimbabwe	Marrakesh, Morocco
	Armoumen 89'			Stadium: Stade El Harti; Attendance: 20,000

17 January 2006 Friendly	Morocco	2–2	Angola	Rabat, Morocco
	Chamakh 5'; Hadji 7'		Akwá 43'; Mantorras 74' (pen.)	Stadium: Stade Moulay Abdellah

21 January 2006 2006 AFCON GS	Morocco	0–1	Ivory Coast	Cairo, Egypt
14:00 UTC+2			Drogba 39' (pen.)	Stadium: Cairo International Stadium; Attendance: 8,000; Referee: Jérôme Damon (South Africa)

24 January 2006 2006 AFCON GS	Egypt	0–0	Morocco	Cairo, Egypt
20:00 UTC+2				Stadium: Cairo International Stadium; Attendance: 47,000; Referee: Coffi Codjia (Benin)

28 January 2006 2006 AFCON GS	Libya	0–0	Morocco	Cairo, Egypt
19:00 UTC+2				Stadium: Cairo Military Academy Stadium; Attendance: 5,000; Referee: Mourad Daami (Tunisia)

23 May 2006 Friendly	United States	0–1	Morocco	Nashville, United States
			Madihi 90'	Stadium: Nashville Coliseum; Attendance: 26,141; Referee: Mauricio Navarro (Canada)

28 May 2006 Friendly	Morocco	0–1	Mali	Colombes, France
			Kanouté 69'	Stadium: Stade Olympique Yves-du-Manoir

4 June 2006 Friendly	Colombia	2–0	Morocco	Barcelona, Spain
	Rodallega 41' (pen.); Soto 86'			Stadium: Camp Nou; Attendance: 11,000

16 August 2006 Friendly	Morocco	1–0	Burkina Faso	Rabat, Morocco
	Hadji 45'			Stadium: Stade Moulay Abdellah

2 September 2006 2008 AFCON Q	Morocco	2–0	Malawi	Rabat, Morocco
	Chamakh 50'; Boussoufa 72'			Stadium: Stade Moulay Abdellah

15 November 2006 Friendly	Morocco	6–0	Gabon	Rabat, Morocco
	El Moubarki 40', 64'; Ouaddouch 61'; Boukhari 68'; Mahdoufi 71'; Souari 89'			Stadium: Stade Moulay Abdellah

=== 2007 ===
7 February 2007 Friendly	Morocco	1–1	Tunisia	Rabat, Morocco
	Chamakh 28'		Jemâa 62'	Stadium: Stade Moulay Abdellah

24 April 2007 2008 AFCON Q	Zimbabwe	1–1	Morocco	Harare, Zimbabwe
	Nyandoro 82'		Hadji 7'	Stadium: Rufaro Stadium

2 June 2007 2008 AFCON Q	Morocco	2–0	Zimbabwe	Casablanca, Morocco
	Chamakh 3'; Hadji 7'			Stadium: Stade Mohammed V

16 June 2007 2008 AFCON Q	Malawi	0–1	Morocco	Blantyre, Malawi
			El Moubarki 12'	Stadium: Kamazu Stadium

8 September 2007 Friendly	Ghana	2–0	Morocco	Rouen, France
	Agogo 47'; Barusso 67'			Stadium: Stade Robert Diochon; Attendance: 3,000

17 October 2007 Friendly	Morocco	2–0	Namibia	Rabat, Morocco
	Alloudi 71'; El Karkouri 90'			Stadium: Stade Moulay Abdellah

16 November 2007 Friendly	France	2–2	Morocco	Saint-Denis, France
	Govou 15'; Nasri 76'		Sektioui 8'; Mokhtari 85'	Stadium: Stade de France; Attendance: 78,000

21 November 2007 Friendly	Morocco	3–0	Senegal	Créteil, France
	Aboucherouane 23'; Mokhtari 73'; Alloudi 74'			Stadium: Stade Dominique Duvauchelle; Attendance: 6,000

=== 2008 ===
12 January 2008 Friendly	Morocco	2–0	Zambia	Fez, Morocco
	Sektioui 52' (pen.); Alloudi 60'			Stadium: Fez Stadium

16 January 2008 Friendly	Morocco	2–1	Angola	Rabat, Morocco
	Chamakh 45+2'; Aboucherouane 51'		Flávio 17'	Stadium: Stade Moulay Abdellah

21 January 2008 2008 AFCON GS	Namibia	1–5	Morocco	Accra, Ghana
15:00 UTC±0	Brendell 24'		Alloudi 1', 5', 28'; Sektioui 40' (pen.); Zerka 74'	Stadium: Ohene Djan Stadium; Attendance: 2,000; Referee: Divine Evehe (Cameroon)

24 January 2008 2008 AFCON GS	Guinea	3–2	Morocco	Accra, Ghana
17:00 UTC±0	Feindouno 11', 63' (pen.); Bangoura 59'		Aboucherouane 60'; Ouaddou 90'	Stadium: Ohene Djan Stadium; Attendance: 15,000; Referee: Jerome Damon (South Africa)

28 January 2008 2008 AFCON GS	Ghana	2–0	Morocco	Accra, Ghana
17:00 UTC±0	Essien 26'; Muntari 45'			Stadium: Ohene Djan Stadium; Attendance: 40,000; Referee: Modou Sowe (Gambia)

26 March 2008 Friendly	Belgium	1–4	Morocco	Brussels, Belgium
	Witsel 51'		Alloudi 14'; Sektioui 35'; El Zhar 85'; Benjelloun 90'	Stadium: Stade Roi Baudouin; Attendance: 24,000

31 May 2008 2010 WCQ / AFCON Q	Morocco	3–0; Annulled (Note: Ethiopia played four matches in this group, before FIFA announced the immediate suspension of the Ethiopian Football Federation (EFF) on 29 July 2008. On 12 September 2008, FIFA excluded the EFF from the 2010 World Cup qualifiers and the results of their matches were cancelled. While it was not clear if they were also explicitly excluded from the 2010 Africa Cup of Nations, their failure to complete the remaining fixtures effectively eliminated them from the tournament.)	Ethiopia	Casablanca, Morocco
19:00 UTC+0	Benjelloun 4'; Aboucherouane 12'; Kharja 86'			Stadium: Stade Mohammed V Attendance: 5,000; Referee: Badara Diatta (Senegal)

7 June 2008 2010 WCQ / AFCON Q	Mauritania	1–4	Morocco	Nouakchott, Mauritania
17:00 UTC±0	Da Silva 82' (pen.)		Sektioui 8'; Benjelloun 36'; Safri 59'; Kharja 79'	Stadium: Stade Olympique; Attendance: 9,500; Referee: Joseph Lamptey (Ghana)

14 June 2008 2010 WCQ / AFCON Q	Rwanda	3–1	Morocco	Kigali, Rwanda
15:30 UTC±2	Makasi 14'; Bokota 58'; Karekezi 90'		Safri 80'	Stadium: Stade Régional Nyamirambo; Attendance: 12,000; Referee: Divine Evehe (Cameroon)

21 June 2008 2010 WCQ / AFCON Q	Morocco	2–0	Rwanda	Casablanca, Morocco
19:00 UTC+1	Safri 11' (pen.); El Zhar 49'			Stadium: Stade Mohammed V Attendance: 2,500; Referee: Mohamed Benouza (Algeria)

20 August 2008 Friendly	Morocco	3–1	Benin	Rabat, Morocco
	Kharja 21'; Safri 56' (pen.); Zerka 78'		Omotoyossi 36'	Stadium: Stade Moulay Abdellah

6 September 2008 Friendly	Oman	0–0	Morocco	Muscat, Oman
				Stadium: Royal Oman Police Stadium

11 October 2008 2010 WCQ / AFCON Q	Morocco	4–1	Mauritania	Rabat, Morocco
19:30 UTC±0	Safri 35' (pen.); Hadji 56', 60'; Zemmama 66'		Teguedi 68'	Stadium: Stade Moulay Abdellah; Attendance: 1,472; Referee: Sharaf Aboubakar (Ivory Coast)

19 November 2008 Friendly	Morocco	3–0	Zambia	Casablanca, Morocco
	Kharja 3'; Sektioui 24' (pen.); Baha 62'			Stadium: Stade Mohammed V

=== 2009 ===
11 February 2009 Friendly	Morocco	0–0	Czech Republic	Casablanca, Morocco
				Stadium: Stade Mohammed V Referee: Makrem Legguem (Tunisia)

28 March 2009 2010 WCQ / AFCON Q	Morocco	1–2	Gabon	Casablanca, Morocco
20:00 UTC±0	El Hamdaoui 83'		Aubameyang 34'; Méyé 45'	Stadium: Stade Mohammed V Attendance: 38,000; Referee: Badara Diatta (Senegal)

31 March 2009 Friendly	Angola	0–2	Morocco	Lisbon, Portugal
			Taarabt 10'; Chamakh 51'	Stadium: Estádio do Restelo

7 June 2009 2010 WCQ / AFCON Q	Cameroon	0–0	Morocco	Yaoundé, Cameroon
15:30 UTC+1				Stadium: Stade Omnisports Ahmadou Ahidjo; Attendance: 35,000; Referee: Rajindraparsad Seechurn (Mauritius)

20 June 2009 2010 WCQ / AFCON Q	Morocco	0–0	Togo	Rabat, Morocco
15:30 UTC±0				Stadium: Stade Moulay Abdellah; Attendance: 22,000; Referee: Wellington Kaoma (Zambia)

12 August 2009 Friendly	Morocco	1–1	Congo	Rabat, Morocco
17:00 UTC+1	El Ahmadi 44'		Moussilou 18'	Stadium: Stade Moulay Abdellah; Referee: Mohamed Benouza (Algeria)

6 September 2009 2010 WCQ / AFCON Q	Togo	1–1	Morocco	Lomé, Togo
15:30 UTC±0	Salifou 3'		Taarabt 90+2'	Stadium: Stade de Kégué; Attendance: 24,651; Referee: Muhmed Ssegonga (Uganda)

10 October 2009 2010 WCQ / AFCON Q	Gabon	3–1	Morocco	Libreville, Gabon
15:30 UTC+1	Mahdoufi 43' (o.g.); Mouloungui 65'; Cousin 70'		Taarabt 88'	Stadium: Stade Omar Bongo; Attendance: 14,000; Referee: Noumandiez Doué (Ivory Coast)

14 November 2009 2010 WCQ / AFCON Q	Morocco	0–2	Cameroon	Fez, Morocco
15:30 UTC±0			Webó 19'; Eto'o 52'	Stadium: Fez Stadium; Attendance: 17,000; Referee: Daniel Bennett (South Africa)

== 2010s ==
=== 2010 ===
11 August 2010 Friendly	Morocco	2–1	Equatorial Guinea	Rabat, Morocco
22:00 UTC+1	Hadji 65', 79'		Anselmo 38'	Stadium: Stade Moulay Abdellah

5 September 2010 2012 AFCON Q	Morocco	0–0	Central African Republic	Rabat, Morocco
21:00 UTC				Stadium: Stade Moulay Abdellah; Referee: Koman Coulibaly (Mali)

9 October 2010 2012 AFCON Q	Tanzania	0–1	Morocco	Dar es Salaam, Tanzania
16:00 UTC+3			El Hamdaoui 43'	Stadium: Benjamin Mkapa National Stadium; Referee: Seechurn Rajindraparsad (Mauritius)

17 November 2010 Friendly	Northern Ireland	1–1	Morocco	Belfast, Northern Ireland
19:45 UTC	Patterson 86' (pen.)		Chamakh 55'	Stadium: Windsor Park; Attendance: 11 200; Referee: Tom Harald Hagen (Norway)

=== 2011 ===
9 February 2011 Friendly	Morocco	3–0	Niger	Marrakesh, Morocco
20:00 UTC	Boussoufa 15', 83' (pen.); El Bakkali 90+3'			Stadium: Marrakesh Stadium

27 March 2011 2012 AFCON Q	Algeria	1–0	Morocco	Annaba, Algeria
20:30 UTC+1	Yebda 5' (pen.)			Stadium: Stade 19 Mai 1956; Referee: Seechurn Rajindraparsad (Mauritius)

4 June 2011 2012 AFCON Q	Morocco	4–0	Algeria	Marrakesh, Morocco
21:00 UTC+1	Benatia 25'; Chamakh 38'; Hadji 60'; Assaidi 68'			Stadium: Marrakesh Stadium; Referee: Noumandiez Doué (Ivory Coast)

10 August 2011 Friendly	Senegal	0–2	Morocco	Dakar, Senegal
17:00 UTC+1			Kharja 10'; El Arabi 25'	Stadium: Stade Léopold Sédar Senghor

4 September 2011 2012 AFCON Q	Central African Republic	0–0	Morocco	Bangui, Central African Republic
15:00 UTC+1				Stadium: Barthelemy Boganda Stadium; Referee: Slim Jedidi (Tunisia)

9 October 2011 2012 AFCON Q	Morocco	3–1	Tanzania	Marrakesh, Morocco
19:30 UTC±0	Chamakh 20'; Taarabt 69'; Boussoufa 90'		Kassim 40'	Stadium: Marrakesh Stadium; Attendance: 38 000; Referee: Bakary Gassama (Gambia)

11 November 2011 2011 LG Cup	Morocco	0–1	Uganda	Marrakesh, Morocco
20:30 UTC±0			Sserumaga 47'	Stadium: Marrakesh Stadium

13 November 2011 2011 LG Cup	Morocco	1–1 (2–4 p)	Cameroon	Marrakesh, Morocco
18:45 UTC±0	Amrabat 90'		Eto'o 73'	Stadium: Marrakesh Stadium

=== 2012 ===
23 January 2012 2012 AFCON GS	Morocco	1–2	Tunisia	Libreville, Gabon
20:00 UTC+1	Kharja 86'		Korbi 34'; Msakni 76'	Stadium: Stade d'Angondjé; Attendance: 28,000; Referee: Daniel Bennett (South Africa)

27 January 2012 2012 AFCON GS	Gabon	3–2	Morocco	Libreville, Gabon
20:00 UTC+1	Aubameyang 76'; Cousin 79'; Mbanangoyé 90+10'		Kharja 24', 90+1' (pen.)	Stadium: Stade d'Angondjé; Attendance: 35,000; Referee: Bakary Gassama (Gambia)

31 January 2012 2012 AFCON GS	Niger	0–1	Morocco	Libreville, Gabon
19:00 UTC+1			Belhanda 78'	Stadium: Stade d'Angondjé; Attendance: 4,000; Referee: Hamada Nampiandraza (Madagascar)

29 February 2012 Friendly	Morocco	2–0	Burkina Faso	Marrakesh, Morocco
19:00 UTC±0	Boussoufa 19'; El-Arabi 64'			Stadium: Marrakesh Stadium

25 May 2012 Friendly	Morocco	0–1	Senegal	Marrakesh, Morocco
18:00 UTC+1			Konaté 10'	Stadium: Marrakesh Stadium

2 June 2012 2014 WCQ	Gambia	1–1	Morocco	Bakau, Gambia
16:30 UTC+0	Jammeh 15'		Kharja 76'	Stadium: Independence Stadium; Attendance: 15,000; Referee: Néant Alioum (Cameroon)

9 June 2012 2014 WCQ	Morocco	2–2	Ivory Coast	Marrakesh, Morocco
21:00 UTC+1	Kharja 40' (pen.); Abourazzouk 89'		Kalou 8'; K.Touré 60'	Stadium: Marrakesh Stadium; Attendance: 36,000; Referee: Gehad Grisha (Egypt)

23 June 2012 2012 Arab Cup GS	Morocco	4–0	Bahrain	Jeddah, Saudi Arabia
18:15 UTC+3	El Bahri 17'; Salhi 78'; Al-Hayam 83' (o.g.); Benjelloun 90'			Stadium: Prince Abdullah al-Faisal Stadium; Referee: Abdullah Al-Balooshi (Qatar)

26 June 2012 2012 Arab Cup GS	Libya	0–0	Morocco	Jeddah, Saudi Arabia
21:00 UTC+3				Stadium: Prince Abdullah al-Faisal Stadium; Referee: Djamel Haimoudi (Algeria)

29 June 2012 2012 Arab Cup GS	Yemen	0–4	Morocco	Jeddah, Saudi Arabia
19:45 UTC+3			Salhi 10' (pen.), 48', 58', 63' (pen.)	Stadium: Prince Abdullah al-Faisal Stadium; Referee: Abdulrahman Al-Amri (Saudi Arabia)

3 July 2012 2012 Arab Cup SF	Morocco	2–1	Iraq	Jeddah, Saudi Arabia
21:30 UTC+3	El Gharib 23'; Salhi 28'		Karim 90+6' (pen.)	Stadium: Prince Abdullah al-Faisal Stadium; Referee: Djamel Haimoudi (Algeria)

6 July 2012 2012 Arab Cup Final	Libya	1–1 (1–3 p)	Morocco	Jeddah, Saudi Arabia
21:00 UTC+3	Al Badri 89'		El Bahri 5'	Stadium: Prince Abdullah al-Faisal Stadium; Referee: Slim Jedidi (Tunisia)
	Penalties
	Al Badri (penalty scored); Al-Ghannoudi (penalty missed); Salama (penalty missed); Al-Sebaee (penalty missed)		(penalty scored) Salhi; (penalty scored) Jahouh; (penalty missed) Abdessamad; (penalty missed) Bourhim; (penalty scored) Benlamalem

15 August 2012 Friendly	Morocco	1–2	Guinea	Rabat, Morocco
20:00 UTC+1	Salhi 90+1'		Mara 11'; Bangoura 25'	Stadium: Stade Moulay Abdellah

9 September 2012 2013 AFCON Q	Mozambique	2–0	Morocco	Maputo, Mozambique
15:00 UTC+2	Miro 75'; Domingues 90+3'			Stadium: Estádio da Machava; Referee: Sylvester Kirwa (Kenya)

13 October 2012 2013 AFCON Q	Morocco	4–0	Mozambique	Marrakesh, Morocco
20:00 UTC±0	Barrada 39'; Kharja 64' (pen.); El-Arabi 85'; Amrabat 90+4'			Stadium: Marrakesh Stadium; Referee: Néant Alioum (Cameroon)

14 November 2012 Friendly	Morocco	0–1	Togo	Casablanca, Morocco
20:00 UTC±0			Adebayor 74'	Stadium: Stade Mohammed V

12 December 2012 Friendly	Morocco	3–0	Niger	El Jadida, Morocco
	Hamdallah 2'; Hadraf 37'; Iajour 51'			Stadium: Stade El Abdi

=== 2013 ===
8 January 2013 Friendly	Morocco	0–0	Zambia	Rosettenville, South Africa
UTC+2				Stadium: Rand Stadium; Referee: Victor Gomes (South Africa)

12 January 2013 Friendly	Morocco	2–1	Namibia	Rosettenville, South Africa
UTC+2	El Hamdaoui 2'; Kaddioui 79'		Kaimbi 43'	Stadium: Rand Stadium; Referee: Victor Hlungwani (South Africa)

19 January 2013 2013 AFCON GS	Angola	0–0	Morocco	Johannesburg, South Africa
21:00 UTC+2				Stadium: Soccer City; Attendance: 25 000; Referee: Badara Diatta (Senegal)

23 January 2013 2013 AFCON GS	Morocco	1–1	Cape Verde	Durban, South Africa
21:00 UTC+2	El-Arabi 78'		Platini 35'	Stadium: Moses Mabhida Stadium; Attendance: 25 000; Referee: Janny Sikazwe (Zambia)

27 January 2013 2013 AFCON GS	Morocco	2–2	South Africa	Durban, South Africa
19:00 UTC+2	El Adoua 10'; Hafidi 82'		Mahlangu 71'; Sangweni 86'	Stadium: Moses Mabhida Stadium; Attendance: 45 000; Referee: Bakary Gassama (Gambia)

6 March 2013 Friendly	Morocco	2–1	Mali	Marrakesh, Morocco
UTC	Abourazzouk 43'; Bemammer 69'	Report	Simpara 76'	Stadium: Marrakesh Stadium

24 March 2013 2014 WCQ	Tanzania	3–1	Morocco	Dar es Salaam, Tanzania
15:00 UTC+3	Ulimwengu 46'; Samata 67', 79'		El-Arabi 90+3'	Stadium: Benjamin Mkapa National Stadium; Referee: Hélder Martins de Carvalho (Angola)

8 June 2013 2014 WCQ	Morocco	2–1	Tanzania	Marrakesh, Morocco
21:00 UTC+1	Hamdallah 39' (pen.); El-Arabi 51'		Kiemba 62'	Stadium: Marrakesh Stadium; Attendance: 15 000; Referee: Daniel Bennett (South Africa)

15 June 2013 2014 WCQ	Morocco	2–0	Gambia	Marrakesh, Morocco
21:00 UTC+1	Barrada 3'; Belhanda 51'			Stadium: Marrakesh Stadium; Attendance: 15 000; Referee: El Fadil Mohamed (Sudan)

6 July 2013 CHAN 2014 Q	Tunisia	0–1	Morocco	Sousse, Tunisia
20:00 UTC+1		Report	El Mobarky 89'	Stadium: Stade Olympique de Sousse, Referee: Maguette N'Diaye (Senegal)

14 July 2013 CHAN 2014 Q	Morocco	0–0	Tunisia	Tanger, Morocco
22:30 UTC		Report		Stadium: Grand Stade de Tanger; Referee: Tessema Weyesa (Ethiopia)

14 August 2013 Friendly	Morocco	1–2	Burkina Faso	Tanger, Morocco
20:00 UTC+1	Barrada 64'	Report	B.Traoré 8'; A.Traoré 50'	Stadium: Stade de Tanger

7 September 2013 2014 WCQ	Ivory Coast	1–1	Morocco	Abidjan, Ivory Coast
17:00 UTC±0	Drogba 83' (pen.)		El-Arabi 52'	Stadium: Stade Félix Houphouët-Boigny; Attendance: 20 000; Referee: Bernard Camille (Seychelles)

11 October 2013 Friendly	Morocco	1–1	South Africa	Agadir, Morocco
UTC±0	El Adoua 50'		Rantie 9'	Stadium: Stade Adrar; Referee: Slim Belkhouas (Tunisia)

=== 2014 ===
12 January 2014 CHAN 2014 GS	Zimbabwe	0–0	Morocco	Cape Town, South Africa
17:00 (UTC+2)		Report		Stadium: Athlone Stadium; Attendance: 4,000; Referee: Bamlak Tessema Weyesa (Ethiopia)

16 January 2014 CHAN 2014 GS	Burkina Faso	1–1	Morocco	Cape Town, South Africa
20:00 (UTC+2)	Ouédraogo 88'	Report	El Bahri 1'	Stadium: Athlone Stadium; Attendance: 3,000; Referee: Mahamadou Keita (Mali)

20 January 2014 CHAN 2014 GS	Morocco	3–1	Uganda	Cape Town, South Africa
19:00 (UTC+2)	Rafik 29'; Iajour 77'; El Ouadi 90+3'	Report	Sentamu 59'	Stadium: Cape Town Stadium; Attendance: 2,500; Referee: Janny Sikazwe (Zambia)

25 January 2014 CHAN 2014 QF	Morocco	3–4 (a.e.t.)	Nigeria	Cape Town, South Africa
17:00 (UTC+2)	Moutouali 33', 40'; Iajour 37'	Report	Ogonna 49'; Ali 56'; Uzoenyi 90'; Ibrahim 111'	Stadium: Cape Town Stadium; Attendance: 8,000; Referee: Bernard Camille (Seychelles)

5 March 2014 Friendly	Morocco	1–1	Gabon	Marrakesh, Morocco
19:00 UTC	El-Arabi 27' (pen.)	Report	Evouna 61'	Stadium: Marrakesh Stadium

23 May 2014 Friendly	Morocco	4–0	Mozambique	Faro, Portugal
: UTC+2	El Kaddouri 29'; El-Arabi 72', 81'; Chahechouhe 86'	Report		Stadium: Estádio de São Luís

28 May 2014 Friendly	Angola	2–0	Morocco	Faro, Portugal
18:00 (UTC+2)	Bastos 51'; Alexandre Cristóvão 89'			Stadium: Estádio Algarve

6 June 2014 Friendly	Russia	2–0	Morocco	Moscow, Russia
18:00 UTC+3	Berezutski 29'; Zhirkov 58'			Stadium: Lokomotiv Stadium; Referee: Pavel Královec (Czech Republic)

3 September 2014 Friendly	Morocco	0–0	Qatar	Casablanca, Morocco
20:00 UTC+1		Report		Stadium: Stade Mohammed V Attendance: 9,500

7 September 2014 Friendly	Morocco	3–0	Libya	Marrakesh, Morocco
19:00 UTC+1	Belhanda 42' (pen.); Barrada 55'; Iajour 88'			Stadium: Marrakesh Stadium; Referee: Mohamed Ben Hassana (Tunisia)

9 October 2014 Friendly	Morocco	4–0	Central African Republic	Marrakesh, Morocco
19:00 UTC	Hamdallah 34', 41', 67'; El Kaddouri 57'			Stadium: Marrakesh Stadium; Attendance: 31,728; Referee: Abou Coulibaly (Ivory Coast)

13 October 2014 Friendly	Morocco	3–0	Kenya	Marrakesh, Morocco
19:00 UTC	Karnass 77'; Boussoufa 86'; Iajour 89'			Stadium: Marrakesh Stadium; Referee: Malang Diedhiou (Senegal)

13 November 2014 Friendly	Morocco	6–1	Benin	Agadir, Morocco
19:00 UTC	Amrabat 7'; Hamdallah 28', 81'; El Kaddouri 31'; El Khaliqi 60'; Chamakh 90'		Gestede 45'	Stadium: Stade Adrar

16 November 2014 Friendly	Morocco	2–1	Zimbabwe	Agadir, Morocco
19:00 UTC	Assaidi 64'; Iajour 79' (pen.)		Bonne 19'	Stadium: Stade Adrar

=== 2015 ===
28 March 2015 Friendly	Morocco	0–1	Uruguay	Agadir, Morocco
19:00 UTC		Report	Cavani 51' (pen.)	Stadium: Stade Adrar

12 June 2015 2017 AFCON Q	Morocco	1–0	Libya	Agadir, Morocco
20:00 UTC+1	El Kaddouri 50'			Stadium: Stade Adrar; Referee: William Agbovi (Ghana)

15 June 2015 CHAN 2016 Q	Morocco	1–1	Tunisia	Casablanca, Morocco
20:00 (UTC+0)	Hafidi 68'	Report	Aouadhi 39'	Stadium: Stade Mohammed V Referee: Ousmane Karembe (Mali)

21 June 2015 CHAN 2016 Q	Morocco	3–0	Libya	Casablanca, Morocco
22:00 (UTC+0)	Iajour 16'; Hafidi 40'; Saâdane 73'	Report		Stadium: Stade Mohammed V Referee: El Fatih Wadeed Khaleel (Sudan)

5 September 2015 2017 AFCON Q	São Tomé and Príncipe	0–3	Morocco	São Tomé, São Tomé and Príncipe
15:30 UTC±0			Amrabat 34'; El Arabi 38'; Dirar 41'	Stadium: Estádio Nacional 12 de Julho; Referee: João Goma (Angola)

9 October 2015 Friendly	Morocco	0–1	Ivory Coast	Agadir, Morocco
19:00 UTC+1			Doumbia 59'	Stadium: Stade Adrar; Attendance: 22 000; Referee: Youssef Srairi (Tunisia)

12 October 2015 Friendly	Morocco	1–1	Guinea	Agadir, Morocco
20:00 UTC+1	El Kaddouri 24' (pen.)		Yattara 21'	Stadium: Stade Adrar; Referee: Maguette Ndiaye (Senegal)

22 October 2015 CHAN 2016 Q	Libya	0–4	Morocco	Radès, Tunisia
18:00 (UTC+1)		Report	Benjelloun 26'; El Mobarky 39'; Housni 84'; Ounajem 90+4'	Stadium: Stade Olympique de Radès; Referee: Daouda Gueye (Senegal)

25 October 2015 CHAN 2016 Q	Tunisia	2–3	Morocco	Radès, Tunisia
18:00 (UTC+1)	Machani 28'; Bguir 80'	Report	Khadrouf 20'; Achchakir 70' (pen.); Ounajem 84'	Stadium: Stade Olympique de Radès; Referee: Ibrahim Nour El Din (Egypt)

12 November 2015 2018 WCQ	Morocco	2–0	Equatorial Guinea	Agadir, Morocco
19:00 UTC±0	El-Arabi 30'; Bammou 66'	Report (FIFA); Report (CAF)		Stadium: Stade Adrar; Attendance: 32 000; Referee: Daniel Bennett (South Africa)

15 November 2015 2018 WCQ	Equatorial Guinea	1–0	Morocco	Bata, Equatorial Guinea
16:00 UTC+1	Rui 14'	Report (FIFA); Report (CAF)		Stadium: Estadio de Bata; Attendance: 20 000; Referee: Janny Sikazwe (Zambia)

=== 2016 ===
16 January 2016 CHAN 2016 GS	Gabon	0–0	Morocco	Kigali, Rwanda
18:00 (UTC+2)		Report		Stadium: Amahoro Stadium; Referee: Joseph Lamptey (Ghana)

20 January 2016 CHAN 2016 GS	Morocco	0–1	Ivory Coast	Kigali, Rwanda
18:00 (UTC+2)		Report	Zakri 45' (pen.)	Stadium: Amahoro Stadium; Referee: Bamlak Tessema Weyesa (Ethiopia)

24 January 2016 CHAN 2016 GS	Morocco	4–1	Rwanda	Kigali, Rwanda
16:00 (UTC+2)	Mouaoui 15', 43'; Aziz 23'; Khadrouf 38'	Report	Ngomirakiza 27'	Stadium: Amahoro Stadium; Referee: Mahamadou Keita (Mali)

26 March 2016 2017 AFCON Q	Cape Verde	0–1	Morocco	Praia, Cape Verde
16:00 UTC−01:00		Report	El-Arabi 26' (pen.)	Stadium: Estádio Nacional de Cabo Verde; Referee: Neant Alioum (Cameroon)

29 March 2016 2017 AFCON Q	Morocco	2–0	Cape Verde	Marrakesh, Morocco
20:00 UTC+1	El-Arabi 54' (pen.), 61'	Report		Stadium: Marrakesh Stadium; Referee: Mahamadou Keita (Mali)

27 May 2016 Friendly	Morocco	2–0	Congo	Tangier, Morocco
19:00 UTC+1	Ziyech 4', 55' (pen.)	Report		Stadium: Stade de Tanger; Referee: Issa Sy (Senegal)

3 June 2016 2017 AFCON Q	Libya	1–1	Morocco	Radès, Tunisia
19:00 UTC+1	Al Warfali 90+1'	Report	Dirar 36'	Stadium: Stade de Radès; Referee: Youssef Essrayri (Tunisia)

31 August 2016 Friendly	Albania	0–0	Morocco	Shkodër, Albania
19:30 UTC+1		Report		Stadium: Loro Boriçi Stadium; Referee: Matej Jug (Slovenia)

4 September 2016 2017 AFCON Q	Morocco	2–0	São Tomé and Príncipe	Rabat, Morocco
20:00 UTC+1	Ziyech 55' (pen.); Bouhaddouz 83'	Report		Stadium: Prince Moulay Abdellah Stadium; Referee: Fidel Gomes (Guinea-Bissau)

8 October 2016 2018 WCQ	Gabon	0–0	Morocco	Franceville, Gabon
17:30 UTC+1		Report (FIFA); Report (CAF)		Stadium: Stade de Franceville; Referee: Hamada Nampiandraza (Madagascar)

11 October 2016 Friendly	Morocco	4–0	Canada	Marrakesh, Morocco
20:00 UTC	Carcela 12'; Ziyech 65', 81'; Alioui 87'	Report		Stadium: Marrakesh Stadium; Referee: Mohammed Abdulla Hassan Mohamed (United Arab Emirates)

12 November 2016 2018 WCQ	Morocco	0–0	Ivory Coast	Marrakesh, Morocco
20:30 UTC		Report (FIFA); Report (CAF)		Stadium: Marrakesh Stadium; Referee: Bernard Camille (Seychelles)

15 November 2016 Friendly	Morocco	2–1	Togo	Marrakesh, Morocco
20:00 UTC	Boutaïb 16', 58'	Report	Ayité 9'	Stadium: Marrakesh Stadium

=== 2017 ===
9 January 2017 Non-FIFA Friendly	Morocco	0–1	Finland	Al Ain, United Arab Emirates
10:00 GMT		Report	Ojala 45+1'	Stadium: Tahnoun bin Mohammed Stadium; Attendance: 3,800; Referee: Sultan Abdulrazaq Ibrahim Al Marzouqi (United Arab Emirates)

16 January 2017 2017 AFCON GS	DR Congo	1–0	Morocco	Oyem, Gabon
19:00 GMT	Kabananga 55'	Report		Stadium: Stade d'Oyem; Referee: Hamada Nampiandraza (Madagascar)

20 January 2017 2017 AFCON GS	Morocco	3–1	Togo	Oyem, Gabon
19:00 GMT	Bouhaddouz 14'; Saïss 21'; En-Nesyri 72'	Report	Dossevi 5'	Stadium: Stade d'Oyem; Referee: Mahamadou Keita (Mali)

24 January 2017 2017 AFCON GS	Morocco	1–0	Ivory Coast	Oyem, Gabon
19:00 GMT	Alioui 64'	Report		Stadium: Stade d'Oyem; Referee: Sidi Alioum (Cameroon)

29 January 2017 2017 AFCON QF	Egypt	1–0	Morocco	Port-Gentil, Gabon
19:00 GMT	Kahraba 88'	Report		Stadium: Stade de Port-Gentil; Referee: Eric Otogo-Castane (Gabon)

24 March 2017 Friendly	Morocco	2–0	Burkina Faso	Marrakesh, Morocco
20:00 GMT	Fajr 35'; Bouhadouz 64'	Report		Stadium: Marrakesh Stadium; Referee: Youssef Srayri (Tunisia)

28 March 2017 Friendly	Morocco	1–0	Tunisia	Marrakesh, Morocco
19:00 GMT	Younés 14' (o.g.)	Report		Stadium: Marrakesh Stadium; Referee: Issa Sy (Senegal)

31 May 2017 Friendly	Morocco	1–2	Netherlands	Agadir, Morocco
17:30 GMT	Boussoufa 71'	Report	Promes 21'; Janssen 67'	Stadium: Stade Adrar; Referee: Mahamadou Kéïta (Mali)

10 June 2017 2019 AFCON Q	Cameroon	1–0	Morocco	Yaoundé, Cameroon
14:00 GMT	Aboubakar 29'	Report		Stadium: Stade Ahmadou Ahidjo; Referee: Bamlak Tessema Weyesa (Ethiopia)

13 August 2017 CHAN 2018 Q	Egypt	1–1	Morocco	Alexandria, Egypt
19:00 (UTC+2)	El-Sheikh 4' (pen.)		Banoun 52'	Stadium: Alexandria Stadium; Referee: Mohamed Ragab Omar (Libya)

18 August 2017 CHAN 2018 Q	Morocco	3–1	Egypt	Rabat, Morocco
20:00 (UTC+1)	El Yamiq 51'; Makran 54'; Boulahroud 70' (pen.)		Semmoumy 86' (o.g.)	Stadium: Prince Moulay Abdellah Stadium; Referee: Sadok Selmi (Tunisia)

1 September 2017 2018 WCQ	Morocco	6–0	Mali	Rabat, Morocco
20:00 GMT	Ziyech 19' (pen.), 61'; Boutaïb 27'; Hakimi 72'; Fajr 86'; Mahi 88'	Report (CAF); Report (FIFA)		Stadium: Stade Moulay Abdellah; Attendance: 50,000; Referee: Sidi Alioum (Cameroon)

5 September 2017 2018 WCQ	Mali	0–0	Morocco	Bamako, Mali
19:00 GMT		Report (CAF); Report (FIFA)		Stadium: Stade du 26 Mars; Attendance: 5,000; Referee: Hamada Nampiandraza (Madagascar)

7 October 2017 2018 WCQ	Morocco	3–0	Gabon	Casablanca, Morocco
20:00 WEST	Boutaïb 38', 56', 72'	Report (CAF); Report (FIFA)		Stadium: Stade Mohammed V Referee: Victor Gomes (South Africa)

10 October 2017 Friendly	South Korea	1–3	Morocco	Biel/Bienne, Switzerland
13:30 GMT	Son 66' (pen.)		Tannane 7', 11'; Haddad 46'	Stadium: Tissot Arena

6 November 2017 2018 WCQ	Ivory Coast	0–2	Morocco	Abidjan, Ivory Coast
		Report (CAF); Report (FIFA)	Dirar 25'; Benatia 30'	Stadium: Stade Félix Houphouët-Boigny; Referee: Bakary Gassama (Gambia)

=== 2018 ===
13 January 2018 CHAN 2018 GS	Morocco	4–0	Mauritania	Casablanca, Morocco
19:00 (UTC)	El Kaabi 66', 79'; Haddad 71'; Bencharki 90+2'	Report		Stadium: Stade Mohammed V Referee: Janny Sikazwe (Zambia)

17 January 2018 CHAN 2018 GS	Morocco	3–1	Guinea	Casablanca, Morocco
16:30 (UTC)	El Kaabi 27', 65', 68'	Report	Saïdouba Camara 29'	Stadium: Stade Mohammed V Referee: Abou Coulibaly (Ivory Coast)

21 January 2018 CHAN 2018 GS	Sudan	0–0	Morocco	Casablanca, Morocco
19:00 (UTC)		Report		Stadium: Stade Mohammed V Referee: Jean-Jacques Ndala Ngambo (DR Congo)

27 January 2018 CHAN 2018 QF	Morocco	2–0	Namibia	Casablanca, Morocco
16:30 (UTC)	El Kaabi 36'; Saidi 54'	Report		Stadium: Stade Mohammed V Referee: Mahamadou Keita (Mali)

31 January 2018 CHAN 2018 SF	Morocco	3–1 (a.e.t.)	Libya	Casablanca, Morocco
16:30 (UTC)	El Kaabi 73', 97'; El Karti 119' (pen.)	Report	Khalleefah 86'	Stadium: Stade Mohammed V Referee: Janny Sikazwe (Zambia)

4 February 2018 CHAN 2018 Final	Morocco	4–0	Nigeria	Casablanca, Morocco
19:00 (UTC)	Hadraf 44', 64'; El Karti 61'; El Kaabi 73'	Report		Stadium: Stade Mohammed V Attendance: 75,000; Referee: Bakary Gassama (Gambia)

23 March 2018 Friendly	Serbia	1–2	Morocco	Turin, Italy
20:30 UTC+1	Tadić 37'	Report	Ziyech 29' (pen.); Boutaïb 40'	Stadium: Stadio Olimpico Grande Torino; Attendance: 15,700; Referee: Marco Guida (Italy)

27 March 2018 Friendly	Morocco	2–0	Uzbekistan	Casablanca, Morocco
20:00 UTC+1	El Kaabi 4' da Costa 43'	Report		Stadium: Stade Mohammed V Attendance: 15,000; Referee: Maguette Ndiaye (Senegal)

31 May 2018 Friendly	Morocco	0–0	Ukraine	Geneva, Switzerland
20:00 UTC+2		Report		Stadium: Stade de Genève; Attendance: 8,000; Referee: Sandro Schärer (Switzerland)

4 June 2018 Friendly	Morocco	2–1	Slovakia	Geneva, Switzerland
20:00 UTC+2	El Kaabi 64'; Belhanda 74'	Report	Greguš 59'	Stadium: Stade de Genève; Attendance: 7,000; Referee: Lionel Tschudi (Switzerland)

9 June 2018 Friendly	Estonia	1–3	Morocco	Tallinn, Estonia
19:00 UTC+3	Purje 76'	Report	Belhanda 11'; Ziyech 38' (pen.); En-Nesyri 72'	Stadium: A. Le Coq Arena; Attendance: 4,756; Referee: Marius Avram (Romania)

15 June 2018 2018 FIFA World Cup GS	Morocco	0–1	Iran	Saint Petersburg, Russia
18:00 UTC+3		Report	Bouhaddouz 90+5' (o.g.)	Stadium: Krestovsky Stadium; Attendance: 62,548; Referee: Cüneyt Çakır (Turkey)

20 June 2018 2018 FIFA World Cup GS	Portugal	1–0	Morocco	Moscow, Russia
15:00 UTC+3	Ronaldo 4'	Report		Stadium: Luzhniki Stadium; Attendance: 78,011; Referee: Mark Geiger (United States)

25 June 2018 2018 FIFA World Cup GS	Spain	2–2	Morocco	Kaliningrad, Russia
20:00 UTC+2	Isco 19'; Aspas 90+1'	Report	Boutaïb 14'; En-Nesyri 81'	Stadium: Kaliningrad Stadium; Attendance: 33,973; Referee: Ravshan Irmatov (Uzbekistan)

8 September 2018 2019 AFCON Q	Morocco	3–0	Malawi	Casablanca, Morocco
21:00 UTC+1	Ziyech 3'; En-Nesyri 42', 78'	Report		Stadium: Stade Mohammed V Referee: Jean-Jacques Ndala Ngambo (DR Congo)

13 October 2018 2019 AFCON Q	Morocco	1–0	Comoros	Casablanca, Morocco
19:00 UTC+1	Fajr 90+7' (pen.)	Report		Stadium: Stade Mohammed V Referee: Ali Lemghaifry (Mauritania)

16 October 2018 2019 AFCON Q	Comoros	2–2	Morocco	Mitsamiouli, Comoros
15:00 UTC+3	Ben Nabouhane 7', 90+2'	Report	Boutaïb 53'; Amrabat 62'	Stadium: Stade Said Mohamed Cheikh; Referee: Davies Omweno (Kenya)

16 November 2018 2019 AFCON Q	Morocco	2–0	Cameroon	Casablanca, Morocco
20:00 UTC+1	Ziyech 54' (pen.), 66'	Report		Stadium: Stade Mohammed V Referee: Eric Otogo-Castane (Gabon)

20 November 2018 Friendly	Tunisia	0–1	Morocco	Radès, Tunisia
18:00 UTC+1		Report	En-Nesyri 41'	Stadium: Stade Olympique de Radès; Attendance: 8,000; Referee: Ibrahim Nour El Din (Egypt)

=== 2019 ===
22 March 2019 2019 AFCON Q	Malawi	0–0	Morocco	Blantyre, Malawi
15:00 (UTC+2)		Report		Stadium: Kamuzu Stadium; Referee: Hélder Martins de Carvalho (Angola)

26 March 2019 Friendly	Morocco	0–1	Argentina	Tangier, Morocco
20:00 (UTC+1)		Report	Correa 83'	Stadium: Stade Ibn Batouta; Referee: Janny Sikazwe (Zambia)

12 June 2019 Friendly	Morocco	0–1	Gambia	Marrakesh, Morocco
17:30 (UTC+1)		Report	Mu. Barrow 27'	Stadium: Marrakesh Stadium; Attendance: 4,000; Referee: Boubou Traore (Mali)

16 June 2019 Friendly	Morocco	2–3	Zambia	Marrakesh, Morocco
17:30 (UTC+1)	Ziyech 24', 55' (pen.)	Report	Musonda 1'; Kangwa 44'; Mwepu 74'	Stadium: Marrakesh Stadium; Attendance: 10,000; Referee: Adalbert Diouf (Senegal)

23 June 2019 2019 AFCON GS	Morocco	1–0	Namibia	Cairo, Egypt
16:30 (UTC+2)	Keimuine 89' (o.g.)	Report		Stadium: Al Salam Stadium; Attendance: 6,857; Referee: Louis Hakizimana (Rwanda)

28 June 2019 2019 AFCON GS	Morocco	1–0	Ivory Coast	Cairo, Egypt
19:00 (UTC+2)	En-Nesyri 23'	Report		Stadium: Al Salam Stadium; Attendance: 27,500; Referee: Sidi Alioum (Cameroon)

1 July 2019 2019 AFCON GS	South Africa	0–1	Morocco	Cairo, Egypt
18:00 (UTC+2)		Report	Boussoufa 90'	Stadium: Al Salam Stadium; Referee: Jean-Jacques Ngambo (DR Congo)

5 July 2019 2019 AFCON R16	Morocco	1–1 (a.e.t.) (1–4 p)	Benin	Cairo, Egypt
18:00 (UTC+2)	En-Nesyri 75'	Report	Adilehou 53'	Stadium: Al Salam Stadium; Referee: Helder Martins de Carvalho (Angola)
	Penalties
	Idrissi (penalty scored); Boufal (penalty missed); En-Nesyri (penalty missed)		(penalty scored) Verdon; (penalty scored) Djigla; (penalty scored) Anaane; (penalty scored) Séïbou

6 September 2019 Friendly	Morocco	1–1	Burkina Faso	Marrakesh, Morocco
20:00 (UTC+1)	Feddal 88'	Report	Bayala 71'	Stadium: Marrakesh Stadium; Attendance: 9,000; Referee: Alioune Sow Sandigui (Senegal)

10 September 2019 Friendly	Morocco	1–0	Niger	Marrakesh, Morocco
20:00 (UTC+1)	El Karti 21'	Report		Stadium: Marrakesh Stadium; Attendance: 4,200

21 September 2019 CHAN 2020 Q	Algeria	0–0	Morocco	Blida, Algeria
19:45 (UTC+1)		Report		Stadium: Mustapha Tchaker Stadium; Referee: Joshua Bondo (Botswana)

11 October 2019 Friendly	Morocco	1–1	Libya	Oujda, Morocco
19:00 (UTC+1)	El Yamiq 20'	Report	Al Warfali 42'	Stadium: Honneur Stadium; Attendance: 25,000

15 October 2019 Friendly	Morocco	2–3	Gabon	Tangier, Morocco
19:00 (UTC+1)	Amrabat 32', 69' (pen.)	Report	Boupendza 22'; Bouanga 48'; Chebake 80' (o.g.)	Stadium: Stade Ibn Batouta; Attendance: 28,000; Referee: Issa Sy (Senegal)

19 October 2019 CHAN 2020 Q	Morocco	3–0	Algeria	Berkane, Morocco
	Banoun 27' (pen.); Ahaddad 32'; Nahiri 41'	Report		Stadium: Stade Municipal; Referee: Mahamadou Keita (Mali)

15 November 2019 2021 AFCON Q	Morocco	0–0	Mauritania	Rabat, Morocco
20:00 (UTC+1)				Stadium: Prince Moulay Abdellah Stadium

19 November 2019 2021 AFCON Q	Burundi	0–3	Morocco	Bujumbura, Burundi
16:00 (UTC+2)			Mazraoui 27'; En-Nesyri 39'; Hakimi 83'	Stadium: Prince Louis Rwagasore Stadium
