= 1994 FIFA World Cup qualification – CAF first round =

Football tournament qualification stage

Listed below are the dates and results for the first round for the African zone (CAF) of the 1994 FIFA World Cup qualification tournament. For an overview of the entire African zone, see the article 1994 FIFA World Cup qualification (CAF). For an overview of the qualification rounds in their entirety, see the article 1994 FIFA World Cup qualification.

A total of 40 CAF teams entered the competition. However, Burkina Faso, Gambia, Malawi, Mali, Mauritania, São Tomé and Príncipe, Sierra Leone and Sudan all withdrew before the draw was made. The Liberian team withdrew during qualification due to financial hardship during the First Liberian Civil War and Libya withdrew due to UN sanctions.

The African zone was allocated 3 places (out of 24) in the final tournament.

For the first round of play, the zone's 36 remaining teams were divided into 9 groups of 4 teams each. The teams would play against each other on a home-and-away basis, with the group winners advancing to the final round.

== Seedings ==
The draw was made on 8 December 1991.

In bold teams that advanced to the Second Round.

Pot 1	Pot 2	Pot 3	Pot 4	Pot 5
**Algeria**; **Cameroon**; Egypt; **Ivory Coast**; Kenya; **Morocco**; **Nigeria**; **Senegal**; **Zambia**	Congo; Gabon; Ghana; **Guinea**; Madagascar; Sudan; Tunisia; Zaire; **Zimbabwe**	Burkina Faso; Liberia; Libya; Mali; ~~Malawi~~; Mozambique; Niger; ~~Sierra Leone~~; Uganda	Angola; Botswana; Burkina Faso; Ethiopia; Gambia; Mauritania; ~~São Tomé & Príncipe~~; Eswatini; Tanzania	Benin; South Africa; Togo

Benin replaced Malawi, South Africa replaced São Tomé and Príncipe, and Togo replaced Sierra Leone, with these withdrawals occurring after seeding.

== Results ==
=== Group A ===
Team	Pld	W	D	L	GF	GA	GD	Pts
Algeria	4	2	1	1	5	4	+1	**5**
Ghana	4	2	0	2	4	3	+1	**4**
Burundi	4	1	1	2	2	4	−2	**3**
Uganda	withdrew							

Algeria advanced to the final round.

9 October 1992

Algeria	3–1	Burundi
Tasfaout 40', 87'; Meziane 70'	Report	Niyonkuru 89' (pen.)

Stade Akid Lotfi, Tlemcen, Algeria
Attendance: 27,000
Referee: Idrissa Sarr (Mauritania)

25 October 1992

Burundi	1–0	Ghana
Habimana 78'

Stade Prince Louis Rwagasore, Bujumbura, Burundi
Attendance: 7,000
Referee: Ali Tahir Hafidhi (Tanzania)

20 December 1992

Ghana	2–0	Algeria
Yeboah 24'; K. Ayew 82'	Report

Accra Sports Stadium, Accra, Ghana
Attendance: 40,000
Referee: Souleymane Badara Sene (Senegal)

17 January 1993

Burundi	0–0	Algeria
	Report

Stade Prince Louis Rwagasore, Bujumbura, Burundi
Attendance: 5,000
Referee: Jonathan Gatera (Rwanda)

31 January 1993

Ghana	1–0	Burundi
A. Pele 19'

Kumasi Sports Stadium, Kumasi, Ghana
Attendance: 31,711
Referee: Idrissa Sarr (Mauritania)

26 February 1993

Algeria	2–1	Ghana
Brahimi 60'; Meziane 85'	Report	Akonnor 12'

Stade Akid Lotfi, Tlemcen, Algeria
Attendance: 30,000
Referee: Lim Kee Chong (Mauritius)

=== Group B ===
Team	Pld	W	D	L	GF	GA	GD	Pts
Cameroon	4	2	2	0	7	1	+6	**6**
Swaziland	3	1	1	1	1	5	−4	**3**
Zaire	3	0	1	2	1	3	−2	**1**
Liberia	withdrew after one match							

Liberia withdrew after one match, the result was annulled. Swaziland and Zaire did not play last match as neither could qualify

Cameroon advanced to the final round.

11 October 1992

Zaire	4 – 2 Annulled	Liberia
Kabongo 39', 50'; Lukaku 72', 85'		Sebwe 32'; Sogbie 55'

Stade Tata Raphaël, Kinshasa, Zaire
Referee: Jean-Fidèle Diramba (Gabon)

18 October 1992

Cameroon	5–0	Swaziland
Tiki 10'; Tchami 16'; Djappa 20'; Mbarga 64'; Fiala 88'

Stade Omnisports, Yaoundé, Cameroon
Attendance: 10,336
Referee: Omer Yengo (Congo)

25 October 1992

Liberia	0 – 0 Annulled	Cameroon

SKD Stadium, Monrovia, Liberia
Referee: Dodji Hounnake-Kouassi (Togo)

25 October 1992

Swaziland	1–0	Zaire
Terblanche 85'

Somhlolo National Stadium, Lobamba, Swaziland
Referee: Haroun Onderah (Kenya)

10 January 1993

Zaire	1–2	Cameroon
Katschi 85' (pen.)		Ebongué 50'; Tchami 60'

Stade Tata Raphaël, Kinshasa, Zaire
Attendance: 28,941
Referee: Joel Dwarf Mondoka (Zambia)

17 January 1993

Swaziland	0–0	Cameroon

Somhlolo National Stadium, Lobamba, Swaziland
Referee: Christian Chikuka (Zambia)

31 January 1993

Zaire	Not Played (Note: The Zaire–Swaziland match was not played, as neither team could advance with a win.)	Swaziland

Stade Tata Raphaël, Kinshasa, Zaire
Referee: Bantsimba (Congo)

1 March 1993

Cameroon	0–0	Zaire

Stade Omnisports, Yaoundé, Cameroon
Referee: Anthony Edusah (Ghana)

=== Group C ===
Team	Pld	W	D	L	GF	GA	GD	Pts
Zimbabwe	6	4	2	0	8	4	+4	**10**
Egypt	6	3	2	1	9	3	+6	**8**
Angola	5	1	2	2	3	4	−1	**4**
Togo	5	0	0	5	2	11	−9	**0**

Togo replaced Sierra Leone after the latter withdrew after seeding.

Angola vs Togo was not played, as neither team could advance with a win.

Zimbabwe advanced to the final round.

9 October 1992

Zimbabwe	1–0	Togo
A. Ndlovu 67'

National Sports Stadium, Harare, Zimbabwe
Attendance: 42,958
Referee: Macnever Mang'anda (Malawi)

11 October 1992

Egypt	1–0	Angola
H. Hassan 63'

Osman Ahmed Osman Stadium, Cairo, Egypt
Referee: Rachid Ben Khedija (Tunisia)

25 October 1992

Togo	1–4	Egypt
Salou 80'		Mansour 24'; H. Hassan 32', 89'; Ramzy 84' (pen.)

Stade de Kégué, Lomé, Togo
Attendance: 10,253
Referee: Cherif Boubacar Mbaye (Senegal)

20 December 1992

Zimbabwe	2–1	Egypt
P. Ndlovu 40'; Sawu 49'		El-Kass 64'

National Sports Stadium, Harare, Zimbabwe
Attendance: 55,000
Referee: Getachew Mekonen (Ethiopia)

10 January 1993

Angola	1–1	Zimbabwe
Russo 60'		Sawu 25'

Estádio da Cidadela, Luanda, Angola
Referee: Kalumba Kabuya (Zaire)

17 January 1993

Togo	1–2	Zimbabwe
Ali 69'		Sawu 47'; McKop 62'

Stade de Kégué, Lomé, Togo
Attendance: 5,464
Referee: Fode Capi Camara (Guinea)

18 January 1993

Angola	0–0	Egypt

Estádio da Cidadela, Luanda, Angola
Referee: Eric Blareau (Belgium)

31 January 1993

Egypt	3–0	Togo
H. Hassan 58'; Ezzat 83'; El-Kass 89'

Cairo Military Academy Stadium, Cairo
Referee: Mohamed Bahar (Madagascar)

31 January 1993

Zimbabwe	2–1	Angola
Sawu 17'; P. Ndlovu 61'		Neto 44'

National Sports Stadium, Harare, Zimbabwe
Referee: Karamchand Teeluckdharry (Mauritius)

14 February 1993

Angola	Not Played (Note: The Angola–Togo match was not played, as neither team could advance with a win.)	Togo

28 February 1993

Egypt	2 – 1 Annulled (Note: The result of the original Egypt–Zimbabwe match was annulled due to crowd violence; it was later replayed on neutral ground.)	Zimbabwe
Kasem 32' (pen.); H. Hassan 40'		Sawu 5'

Cairo International Stadium, Cairo, Egypt
Referee: Jean-Fidèle Diramba (Gabon)

28 February 1993

Togo	0–1	Angola
		Paulão 83'

Stade de Kégué, Lomé, Togo
Attendance: 2,427
Referee: Ousmane Souleymane Diallo (Burkina Faso)

15 April 1993

Egypt	0 – 0 Replay	Zimbabwe

Stade de Gerland, Lyon, France (Note: The second Egypt–Zimbabwe match took place in France instead on in Egypt due to the crowd violence that had caused the previous match's results to be annulled.)
Attendance: 10,000
Referee: Joël Quiniou (France)

=== Group D ===
Team	Pld	W	D	L	GF	GA	GD	Pts
Nigeria	4	3	1	0	7	0	+7	**7**
South Africa	4	2	1	1	2	4	−2	**5**
Congo	4	0	0	4	0	5	−5	**0**
Libya	withdrew, results annulled (Note: Libya was originally scheduled to play all of its matches away; however, it withdrew in protest to this ruling and due to the UN sanctions against it.)							

South Africa replaced São Tomé and Príncipe after the latter withdrew after seeding.

Nigeria advanced to the final round.

10 October 1992

Nigeria	4–0	South Africa
Ricky 34'; Siasa 56'; Yekini 65', 89'

Surulere Stadium, Lagos, Nigeria
Attendance: 40,738
Referee: Rex Odei (Ghana)

25 October 1992

South Africa	1–0	Congo
Masinga 27'

Soccer City, Johannesburg, South Africa
Attendance: 18,964
Referee: Lim Kee Chong (Mauritius)

20 December 1992

Congo	0–1	Nigeria
		Yekini 22'

Stade Alphonse Massemba-Débat, Brazzaville, Congo
Attendance: 60,000
Referee: Pierre Alain Mounguengui (Gabon)

16 January 1993

South Africa	0–0	Nigeria

Soccer City, Johannesburg, South Africa
Attendance: 47,748
Referee: Edwin Senai (Botswana)

31 January 1993

Congo	0–1	South Africa
		Legodi 86'

Stade Alphonse Massemba-Débat, Brazzaville, Congo
Attendance: 6,000
Referee: Sylvain Abikanlou (Benin)

27 February 1993

Nigeria	2–0	Congo
Fuludu 14'; George 84'

Nnamdi Azikiwe Stadium, Enugu, Nigeria
Attendance: 30,202
Referee: Mohamed Kouradji (Algeria)

=== Group E ===
Team	Pld	W	D	L	GF	GA	GD	Pts
Ivory Coast	4	2	2	0	7	0	+7	**6**
Niger	4	2	1	1	3	2	+1	**5**
Botswana	4	0	1	3	1	9	−8	**1**
Sudan	withdrew							

Ivory Coast advanced to the final round.

10 October 1992

Ivory Coast	6–0	Botswana
A. Traoré 10', 17' (pen.), 86'; Ben Salah 14'; Tiéhi 69'; Kouadio 70'

Stade Félix Houphouët-Boigny, Abidjan, Ivory Coast
Attendance: 15,052
Referee: Titus Olabode Adegbehingbe (Nigeria)

25 October 1992

Niger	0–0	Ivory Coast

Stade de 29 Juillet, Niamey, Niger
Attendance: 14,230
Referee: Ahmat Kinder (Ghana)

20 December 1992

Botswana	0–1	Niger
		Yattaga 32'

Botswana National Stadium, Gaborone, Botswana
Referee: Wallace Ernest Mabuza (Swaziland)

17 January 1993

Botswana	0–0	Ivory Coast

Botswana National Stadium, Gaborone, Botswana
Referee: Alem Assefa (Ethiopia)

31 January 1993

Ivory Coast	1–0	Niger
A. Traoré 54'

Stade Félix Houphouët-Boigny, Abidjan, Ivory Coast
Attendance: 18,011
Referee: Mamadouba Engage Camara (Guinea)

28 February 1993

Niger	2–1	Botswana
Yahaya 23', 89'		Duiker 37'

Stade de 29 Juillet, Niamey, Niger
Referee: Sidi Bekaye Magassa (Mali)

=== Group F ===
Team	Pld	W	D	L	GF	GA	GD	Pts
Morocco	6	4	2	0	13	1	+12	**10**
Tunisia	6	3	3	0	14	2	+12	**9**
Ethiopia	6	1	1	4	3	11	−8	**3**
Benin	6	1	0	5	3	19	−16	**2**

Benin replaced Malawi after the latter withdrew after seeding.

Morocco advanced to the final round.

11 October 1992

Tunisia	5–1	Benin
F. Roussi 16' (pen.); Mahjoubi 30'; Hamrouni 40', 52'; Sellimi 77'		Sacramento 43'

Stade El Menzah, Tunis, Tunisia
Attendance: 30,118
Referee: Pierluigi Pairetto (Italy)

11 October 1992

Morocco	5 – 0 Suspended at 51' (Note: The Morocco–Ethiopia match was suspended after 51 minutes due to Ethiopia being reduced to seven players; the result was affirmed.)	Ethiopia
Chaouch 2', 29'; Fertout 14'; Lashaf 40'; Samadi 50'

Stade Mohammed V, Casablanca, Morocco
Attendance: 6,820
Referee: Rachid Medjiba (Algeria)

25 October 1992

Ethiopia	0–0	Tunisia

Stade Haile Selassie, Addis Ababa, Ethiopia
Attendance: 2,488
Referee: Bora Mady Kanoso (Madagascar)

25 October 1992

Benin	0–1	Morocco
		Daoudi 50'

Stade de l'Amitié, Cotonou, Benin
Attendance: 2,488
Referee: Oi Attikora (Ivory Coast)

20 December 1992

Tunisia	1–1	Morocco
F. Rouissi 44'		Bouyboub 85'

Stade El Menzah, Tunis, Tunisia
Attendance: 36,950
Referee: Michel Piraux (Belgium)

20 December 1992

Ethiopia	3–1	Benin
Hussein 7'; Beguashaw 38'; Tenker 50'		Sossa 21'

Stade Haile Selassie, Addis Ababa, Ethiopia
Referee: Christopher Yolisichra-Musa (Uganda)

17 January 1993

Ethiopia	0–1	Morocco
		Fertout 33'

Addis Ababa Stadium, Addis Ababa, Ethiopia
Attendance: 12,757
Referee: Martin Bita Omondi (Kenya)

17 January 1993

Benin	0–5	Tunisia
		Tlemçani 15'; L. Rouissi 18', 42'; Herichi 45', 61'

Stade de l'Amitié, Cotonou, Benin
Attendance: 5,933
Referee: Lazare Essimi Mbengue (Cameroon)

31 January 1993

Tunisia	3–0	Ethiopia
Limam 4'; Mahjoubi 73'; Hamrouni 89'

Stade El Menzah, Tunis, Tunisia
Attendance: 7,500
Referee: Jean-Fidèle Diramba (Gabon)

31 January 1993

Morocco	5–0	Benin
Chaouch 2', 17'; El Khalej 42'; Abrami 60' (pen.); Mezziane 72'

Prince Moulay Abdellah Stadium, Rabat, Morocco
Attendance: 9,602
Referee: Cherif Boubacar Mbaye (Senegal)

28 February 1993

Benin	1–0	Ethiopia
Arouna 62'

Stade de l'Amitié, Cotonou, Benin
Referee: Zakaria Camara (Guinea)

28 February 1993

Morocco	0–0	Tunisia

Stade Mohammed V, Casablanca, Morocco
Attendance: 60,000
Referee: Leslie Mottram (Scotland)

=== Group G ===
Team	Pld	W	D	L	GF	GA	GD	Pts
Senegal	4	3	0	1	10	4	+6	**6**
Gabon	4	2	1	1	7	5	+2	**5**
Mozambique	4	0	1	3	3	11	−8	**1**
Mauritania	withdrew							

Senegal advanced to the final round.

11 October 1992

Gabon	3–1	Mozambique
Nzamba 12', 24'; Aubameyang 75'		Sardina 17'

Stade Omnisport de Libreville, Libreville, Gabon
Attendance: 8,903
Referee: Joao Do Nascimento Gonçalves (Angola)

25 October 1992

Mozambique	0–1	Senegal
		Diallo 86'

Estádio da Machava, Maputo, Mozambique
Attendance: 12,000
Referee: Christian Chikuka (Zambia)

19 December 1992

Gabon	3–2	Senegal
Amégasse 37'; Nzamba 60'; Ondo 82'		Lette 34'; Sané 74'

Stade Omnisport de Libreville, Libreville, Gabon
Attendance: 25,000
Referee: Mamadouba Engage Camara (Guinea)

17 January 1993

Mozambique	1–1	Gabon
Owanga 50'		Nzamba 40'

Estádio da Machava, Maputo, Mozambique
Attendance: 8,778
Referee: Ali Tahir Hafidhi (Tanzania)

30 January 1993

Senegal	6–1	Mozambique
Sané 13', 20'; Seck 27', 82'; Badiane 48'; Diarra 75'		Tembe 44'

Stade Leopold Senghor, Dakar, Senegal
Attendance: 6,758
Referee: Emmanuel Dada Obafemi (Nigeria)

27 February 1993

Senegal	1–0	Gabon
Badiane 35'

Stade Leopold Senghor, Dakar, Senegal
Referee: Moulay-Lahcen Najachi (Morocco)

=== Group H ===
Team	Pld	W	D	L	GF	GA	GD	Pts
Zambia	4	3	0	1	11	3	+8	**6**
Madagascar	4	3	0	1	7	3	+4	**6**
Namibia	4	0	0	4	0	12	−12	**0**
Tanzania	withdrew, results annulled							

Namibia replaced Burkina Faso who withdrew after seeding

Zambia advanced to the final round.

11 October 1992

Zambia	2 – 0 Annulled	Tanzania
J. Bwalya 20'; Mutale 30'

Independence Stadium, Lusaka, Zambia
Attendance: 29,000
Referee: Gerald Gwatidzo (Zimbabwe)

11 October 1992

Madagascar	3–0	Namibia
Jean-Paul 29'; Harry 44', 58'

Mahamasina Municipal Stadium, Antananarivo, Madagascar
Attendance: 13,650
Referee: Goinsamy Maunick (Mauritius)

25 October 1992

Tanzania	0 – 0 Annulled	Madagascar

CCM Kirumba Stadium, Mwanza, Tanzania
Attendance: 6,881
Referee: Charles Bakundukize (Burundi)

25 October 1992

Namibia	0–4	Zambia
		Chikwalakwala 15', 35'; Mutale 22', 26'

Independence Stadium, Windhoek, Namibia
Referee: Louis Yana Yana (Cameroon)

19 December 1992

Tanzania	2 – 0 Annulled	Namibia
Lunyamila 52'; Minde 74'

CCM Kirumba Stadium, Mwanza, Tanzania
Referee: Charles Masembe (Uganda)

20 December 1992

Madagascar	2–0	Zambia
Rasoanaivo 52'; Jean-Paul 90'

Mahamasina Municipal Stadium, Antananarivo, Madagascar
Attendance: 23,050
Referee: Bekele Kidane (Ethiopia)

16 January 1993

Tanzania	1 – 3 Annulled	Zambia
Jumanne 44'		K. Bwalya 5'; Mwila 42'; A. Bwalya 67'

CCM Kirumba Stadium, Mwanza, Tanzania
Attendance: 8,894
Referee: Charles Bakundukize (Burundi)

17 January 1993

Namibia	0–1	Madagascar
		Remi 3'

Independence Stadium, Windhoek, Namibia
Referee: Jelas Ntebu Masole (Botswana)

20 January 1993

Zambia	4–0	Namibia
Chansa 4'; Musonda 2' (pen.); K. Bwalya 79'; Simambe 84'

Independence Stadium, Lusaka, Zambia
Referee: Jorge Mario Femandes (Angola)

27 February 1993

Zambia	3–1	Madagascar
Mutale 14'; K. Bwalya 65'; Mwitwa 68'		Rasoanaivo 82'

Independence Stadium, Lusaka, Zambia
Referee: Hussein Ali Mousa (Egypt)

=== Group I ===
Team	Pld	W	D	L	GF	GA	GD	Pts
Guinea	2	1	0	1	4	2	+2	**2**
Kenya	2	1	0	1	2	4	−2	**2**
Gambia	withdrew							
Mali	withdrew							

Guinea advanced to the final round.

20 December 1992

Guinea	4–0	Kenya
F. Camara 51'; Oularé 53'; T. Camara 65', 89'

Stade du 28 Septembre, Conakry, Guinea
Attendance: 23,000
Referee: Infali Cassama (Gabon)

27 February 1993

Kenya	2–0	Guinea
Matego 10'; Nachok 88'

Moi International Sports Centre, Nairobi, Kenya
Attendance: 6,785
Referee: Fethi Boucetta (Tunisia)
