= 1994 FIFA World Cup qualification – CAF second round =

Football tournament qualification stage

This page provides the summaries of the CAF second round matches for the 1994 FIFA World Cup qualification. The nine qualifiers (the nine group winners from the first round) were split into three groups of three. Teams in each group played a home-and-away round-robin, with the three groups winners advancing to the World Cup finals.

The December 1991 draw predetermined this mathematical structure to the Second Round.

Winners of each group

Group A	Group B	Group C	Group D	Group E	Group F	Group G	Group H	Group I
Algeria	Cameroon	Zimbabwe	Nigeria	Ivory Coast	Morocco	Senegal	Zambia	Guinea

+ Group A (Second Round): Composed of the Winner of Group A + Winner of Group D + Winner of Group E.

+ Group B (Second Round): Composed of the Winner of Group F + Winner of Group G + Winner of Group H.

+ Group C (Second Round): Composed of the Winner of Group B + Winner of Group C + Winner of Group I.

== Group A ==
=== Ranking ===
Team	Pld	W	D	L	GF	GA	GD	Pts
Nigeria	4	2	1	1	10	5	+5	5
Ivory Coast	4	2	1	1	5	6	−1	5
Algeria	4	0	2	2	3	7	−4	2

Nigeria qualified for the World Cup.

=== Results ===
16 April 1993

Algeria	1–1	Ivory Coast
Tasfaout 28'		Ben Salah 4'

Stade Akid Lotfi, Tlemcen (Algeria)
Attendance: 25,000
Referee: Omer Yengo (Congo)

2 May 1993

Ivory Coast	2–1	Nigeria
A. Traoré 70' (pen.); Ouattara 75'		Yekini 5'

Stade Félix Houphouët-Boigny, Abidjan (Ivory Coast)
Attendance: 27,512
Referee: Lim Kee Chong (Mauritius)

3 July 1993

Nigeria	4–1	Algeria
Okocha 12'; Yekini 26', 32'; Amokachi 88'		Tasfaout 5'

Lagos National Stadium, Lagos (Nigeria)
Attendance: 47,645
Referee: Jean-Fidèle Diramba (Gabon)

18 July 1993

Ivory Coast	1–0	Algeria
Tiéhi 86'

Stade Félix Houphouët-Boigny, Abidjan (Ivory Coast)
Attendance: 35,000
Referee: Charles Masembe (Uganda)

25 September 1993

Nigeria	4–1	Ivory Coast
Oliha 20'; Amokachi 25'; Yekini 57' (pen.), 79'		Tiéhi 50'

Lagos National Stadium, Lagos (Nigeria)
Attendance: 65,000
Referee: Neji Jouini (Tunisia)

8 October 1993

Algeria	1–1	Nigeria
Tasfaout 66'		George 20'

Stade 5 Juillet 1962, Algiers (Algeria)
Attendance: 2,610
Referee: Lim Kee Chong (Mauritius)

== Group B ==
=== Ranking ===
Team	Pld	W	D	L	GF	GA	GD	Pts
Morocco	4	3	0	1	6	3	+3	6
Zambia	4	2	1	1	6	2	+4	5
Senegal	4	0	1	3	1	8	−7	1

Morocco qualified for the World Cup.

=== Results ===
18 April 1993

Morocco	1–0	Senegal
Chaouch 82'

Stade Mohamed V, Casablanca (Morocco)
Attendance: 75,000
Referee: Alhagi Faye (Gambia)

4 July 1993

Zambia	2–1	Morocco
K. Bwalya 60'; J. Bwalya 67'		Daoudi 11'

Independence Stadium, Lusaka (Zambia)
Attendance: 50,000
Referee: Hafidh Ali Tahir (Tanzania)

17 July 1993

Senegal	1–3	Morocco
Sané 65'		Bouyboud 8'; Daoudi 62'; Fertout 75'

Stade Leopold Senghor, Dakar (Senegal)
Attendance: 43,412
Referee: Neji Jouini (Tunisia)

7 August 1993

Senegal	0–0	Zambia

Stade Félix Houphouët-Boigny, Abidjan (Ivory Coast)
Attendance: 15,000
Referee: Mohammad Awad Fouda (Saudi Arabia)

26 September 1993

Zambia	4–0	Senegal
Mbasela 11'; Litana 55'; Malitoli 71'; K. Bwalya 85'

Independence Stadium, Lusaka (Zambia)
Attendance: 50,000
Referee: Kwang-Taik Kim (South Korea)

10 October 1993

Morocco	1–0	Zambia
Laghrissi 62'

Stade Mohamed V, Casablanca (Morocco)
Attendance: 49,383
Referee: Jean-Fidèle Diramba (Gabon)

== Group C ==
=== Ranking ===
Team	Pld	W	D	L	GF	GA	GD	Pts
Cameroon	4	3	0	1	7	3	+4	6
Zimbabwe	4	2	0	2	3	6	−3	4
Guinea	4	1	0	3	4	5	−1	2

Cameroon qualified for the World Cup.

=== Results ===
18 April 1993

Cameroon	3–1	Guinea
Tchami 7', 49'; Ewane 90'		Sylla 62'

Ahmadou Ahidjo Stadium, Yaoundé (Cameroon)
Attendance: 32,761
Referee: Rachid Medjiba (Algeria)

2 May 1993

Guinea	3–0	Zimbabwe
T. Camara 2'; Dramé 16'; F. Camara 80'

Stade du 28 Septembre, Conakry (Guinea)
Attendance: 25,000
Referee: Mohamed Bahar (Morocco)

4 July 1993

Zimbabwe	1–0	Cameroon
Sawu 86'

National Sports Stadium, Harare (Zimbabwe)
Attendance: 71,160
Referee: Emmanuel Dada Obafemi (Nigeria)

18 July 1993

Guinea	0–1	Cameroon
		Embé 45'

Stade du 28 Septembre, Conakry (Guinea)
Attendance: 15,000
Referee: Jamal Al Sharif (Syria)

26 September 1993

Zimbabwe	1–0	Guinea
Sawu 3'

National Sports Stadium, Harare (Zimbabwe)
Attendance: 54,955
Referee: Omer Yengo(Congo)

10 October 1993

Cameroon	3–1	Zimbabwe
Omam-Biyik 13' (pen.), 27'; Maboang 89'		A. Ndlovu 50'

Ahmadou Ahidjo Stadium, Yaoundé (Cameroon)
Attendance: 85,000
Referee: Alhagi Faye (Gambia)
