= 1994 FIFA World Cup qualification (CAF) =

Tournament statistics
- Top scorer(s): (Nigeria) Rashidi Yekini (8 goals)

Listed below are the dates and results for the 1994 FIFA World Cup qualification rounds for the African zone (CAF). For an overview of the qualification rounds, see the article 1994 FIFA World Cup qualification.

A total of 40 CAF teams entered the competition. However, Burkina Faso, Malawi, São Tomé and Príncipe and Sierra Leone all withdrew before the draw was made. Later, Libya withdrew due to UN sanctions, and Liberia withdrew during qualification due to financial hardship during the First Liberian Civil War.

The African Zone was allocated three places (out of 24) in the final tournament, which went to Nigeria, Morocco, and Cameroon.

== Format ==
There would be two rounds of play:

- First Round: The 39 teams were divided into 9 groups of 4 or 5 teams each. The teams would play against each other on a home-and-away basis. The group winners would advance to the Second Round.
- Second Round: The 9 teams were divided into 3 groups of 3 teams each. The teams would play against each other on a home-and-away basis. The group winners would qualify.

== First round ==
=== Group A ===
Rank	Team	Pts	Pld	W	D	L	GF	GA	GD
1	Algeria	5	4	2	1	1	5	4	+1
2	Ghana	4	4	2	0	2	4	3	+1
3	Burundi	3	4	1	1	2	2	4	−2
4	Uganda	0	0	0	0	0	0	0	0

Algeria advanced to the Second Round.

=== Group B ===
Rank	Team	Pts	Pld	W	D	L	GF	GA	GD
1	Cameroon	6	4	2	2	0	7	1	+6
2	Swaziland	3	3	1	1	1	1	5	−4
3	Zaire	1	3	0	1	2	1	3	−2
4	Liberia	0	0	0	0	0	0	0	0

Cameroon advanced to the Second Round. Liberia withdrew after playing one match, its result was annulled

=== Group C ===
Rank	Team	Pts	Pld	W	D	L	GF	GA	GD
1	Zimbabwe	10	6	4	2	0	8	4	+4
2	Egypt	8	6	3	2	1	9	3	+6
3	Angola	4	5	1	2	2	3	4	−1
4	Togo	0	5	0	0	5	2	11	−9

Zimbabwe advanced to the Second Round.

=== Group D ===
Rank	Team	Pts	Pld	W	D	L	GF	GA	GD
1	Nigeria	7	4	3	1	0	7	0	+7
2	South Africa	5	4	2	1	1	2	4	−2
3	Congo	0	4	0	0	4	0	5	−5
4	Libya	0	0	0	0	0	0	0	0
5	São Tomé and Príncipe	0	0	0	0	0	0	0	0

Nigeria advanced to the Second Round.

=== Group E ===
Rank	Team	Pts	Pld	W	D	L	GF	GA	GD
1	Ivory Coast	6	4	2	2	0	7	0	+7
2	Niger	5	4	2	1	1	3	2	+1
3	Botswana	1	4	0	1	3	1	9	−8
4	Sudan	0	0	0	0	0	0	0	0

Ivory Coast advanced to the Second Round.

=== Group F ===
Rank	Team	Pts	Pld	W	D	L	GF	GA	GD
1	Morocco	10	6	4	2	0	13	1	+12
2	Tunisia	9	6	3	3	0	14	2	+12
3	Ethiopia	3	6	1	1	4	3	11	−8
4	Benin	2	6	1	0	5	3	19	−16
5	Malawi	0	0	0	0	0	0	0	0

Morocco advanced to the Second Round.

=== Group G ===
Rank	Team	Pts	Pld	W	D	L	GF	GA	GD
1	Senegal	6	4	3	0	1	10	4	+6
2	Gabon	5	4	2	1	1	7	5	+2
3	Mozambique	1	4	0	1	3	3	11	−8
4	Mauritania	0	0	0	0	0	0	0	0

Senegal advanced to the Second Round.

=== Group H ===
Rank	Team	Pts	Pld	W	D	L	GF	GA	GD
1	Zambia	6	4	3	0	1	11	3	+8
2	Madagascar	6	4	3	0	1	7	3	+4
3	Namibia	0	4	0	0	4	0	12	−12
4	Tanzania	0	0	0	0	0	0	0	0
5	Burkina Faso	0	0	0	0	0	0	0	0

Zambia advanced to the Second Round.

=== Group I ===
Rank	Team	Pts	Pld	W	D	L	GF	GA	GD
1	Guinea	2	2	1	0	1	4	2	+2
2	Kenya	2	2	1	0	1	2	4	−2
3	Gambia	0	0	0	0	0	0	0	0
4	Mali	0	0	0	0	0	0	0	0

Guinea advanced to the Second Round.

== Second round ==
=== Group A ===
Team	Pld	W	D	L	GF	GA	GD	Pts
Nigeria	4	2	1	1	10	5	+5	5
Ivory Coast	4	2	1	1	5	6	−1	5
Algeria	4	0	2	2	3	7	−4	2

Nigeria qualified for the World Cup.

=== Group B ===
Team	Pld	W	D	L	GF	GA	GD	Pts
Morocco	4	3	0	1	6	3	+3	6
Zambia	4	2	1	1	6	2	+4	5
Senegal	4	0	1	3	1	8	−7	1

Morocco qualified for the World Cup.

=== Group C ===
Team	Pld	W	D	L	GF	GA	GD	Pts
Cameroon	4	3	0	1	7	3	+4	6
Zimbabwe	4	2	0	2	3	6	−3	4
Guinea	4	1	0	3	4	5	−1	2

Cameroon qualified for the World Cup.

== Qualified teams ==
The following three teams from CAF qualified for the final tournament.

Team	Qualified as	Qualified on	Previous appearances in FIFA World Cup^{1}
Nigeria	Final round group A winners	8 October 1993	0 (debut)
Morocco	Final round group B winners	10 October 1993	2 (1970, 1986)
Cameroon	Final round group C winners	10 October 1993	2 (1982, 1990)

^{1} Bold indicates champions for that year. Italic indicates hosts for that year.

== Goalscorers ==
8 goals

- (Nigeria) Rashidi Yekini

6 goals

- (Zimbabwe) Agent Sawu

5 goals

- (Algeria) Abdelhafid Tasfaout
- (Ivory Coast) Abdoulaye Traoré
- (Morocco) Mohammed Chaouch

4 goals

- (Cameroon) Alphonse Tchami
- (Egypt) Hossam Hassan
- (Gabon) Guy Roger Nzamba
- (Senegal) Souleyman Sané
- (Zambia) Kalusha Bwalya

3 goals

- (Ivory Coast) Joël Tiéhi
- (Guinea) Titi Camara
- (Morocco) Abdelmajid Bouyboud
- (Morocco) Youssef Fertout
- (Tunisia) Ayedi Hamrouni
- (Zambia) Kelvin Mutale

2 goals

- (Algeria) Mourad Meziane
- (Cameroon) François Omam-Biyik
- (Ivory Coast) Omar Ben Salah
- (Egypt) Ahmed El-Kass
- (Guinea) Fodé Camara
- (Madagascar) Jean-Paul
- (Madagascar) Harry Elyse Randrianaivo
- (Morocco) Rachid Daoudi
- (Niger) Moussa Yahaya
- (Nigeria) Daniel Amokachi
- (Nigeria) Finidi George
- (Senegal) Moussa Badiane
- (Senegal) Alagame Seck
- (Tunisia) Taoufik Herichi
- (Tunisia) Mohamed Ali Mahjoubi
- (Tunisia) Faouzi Rouissi
- (Tunisia) Lotfi Rouissi
- (Zambia) Moses Chikwalakwala
- (Zimbabwe) Adam Ndlovu
- (Zimbabwe) Peter Ndlovu

1 goal

- (Algeria) Mohamed Brahimi
- (Angola) Antonio Neto
- (Angola) José Neves
- (Angola) Paulão
- (Benin) Youssouf Arouna
- (Benin) Euloge Sacramento
- (Benin) Comlan Lambert Sossa
- (Botswana) Itumeleng Duiker
- (Burundi) Amani Habimana
- (Burundi) Albert Niyonkuru
- (Cameroon) Olivier Djappa
- (Cameroon) Ernest Ebongué
- (Cameroon) David Embé
- (Cameroon) Jacob Ewane
- (Cameroon) Jean-Pierre Fiala
- (Cameroon) Emmanuel Maboang
- (Cameroon) Joseph Mbarga
- (Cameroon) Emmanuel Tiki
- (Ivory Coast) Lucien Kassi-Kouadio
- (Ivory Coast) Ahmed Ouattara
- (Egypt) Yasser Ezzat
- (Egypt) Ayman Mansour
- (Egypt) Hany Ramzy
- (Ethiopia) Milyon Beguashaw
- (Ethiopia) Mengitsu Hussein
- (Ethiopia) Asnake Tenker
- (Gabon) François Amégasse
- (Gabon) Pierre Aubameyang
- (Gabon) Valery Ondo
- (Ghana) Charles Akonnor
- (Ghana) Kwame Ayew
- (Ghana) Abedi Pele
- (Ghana) Tony Yeboah
- (Guinea) Sékou Dramé
- (Guinea) Souleymane Oularé
- (Guinea) Mohamed Sylla
- (Kenya) Henry Motego
- (Kenya) Patrick Nachok
- (Madagascar) Etienne Rado Rasoanaivo
- (Madagascar) Fidy Rasoanaivo
- (Madagascar) Frederic Remi
- (Morocco) Lahcen Abrami
- (Morocco) Tahar El Khalej
- (Morocco) Abdeslam Laghrissi
- (Morocco) Mohammed Lashaf
- (Morocco) Abdelkabir Mezziane
- (Morocco) Mohamed Samadi
- (Mozambique) Arnaldo Owanga
- (Mozambique) Antonio Sardina
- (Mozambique) Henrique Tembe
- (Niger) Soumaila Yattaga
- (Nigeria) Edema Fuludu
- (Nigeria) Jay-Jay Okocha
- (Nigeria) Thomson Oliha
- (Nigeria) Richard Daddy Owubokiri
- (Nigeria) Samson Siasia
- (Senegal) Mamadou Diarra
- (Senegal) Mamadou Diallo
- (Senegal) Papa Yakhya Lette
- (South Africa) Harold Legodi
- (South Africa) Phil Masinga
- (Eswatini) Turbie Terblanche
- (Togo) Salissou Ali
- (Togo) Tadjou Salou
- (Tunisia) Jameleddine Limam
- (Tunisia) Adel Sellimi
- (Tunisia) Ziad Tlemçani
- (Zaire) Okita Katschi
- (Zambia) Johnson Bwalya
- (Zambia) Wisdom Mumba Chansa
- (Zambia) Elijah Litana
- (Zambia) Kenneth Malitoli
- (Zambia) Gibby Mbasela
- (Zambia) Charly Musonda
- (Zambia) Timothy Mwitwa
- (Zambia) Kenan Simambe
- (Zimbabwe) Henry McKop
