= Saïd Rokbi =

Moroccan footballer (born 1969)

Personal information
- Date of birth: 20 October 1969 (age 57)
- Position: Forward

International career
Years	Team	Apps	(Gls)
- Morocco

Saïd Rokbi (born 20 October 1969) is a Moroccan former footballer. He competed in the 1992 Summer Olympics.
