= El Arbi Hababi =

Moroccan footballer

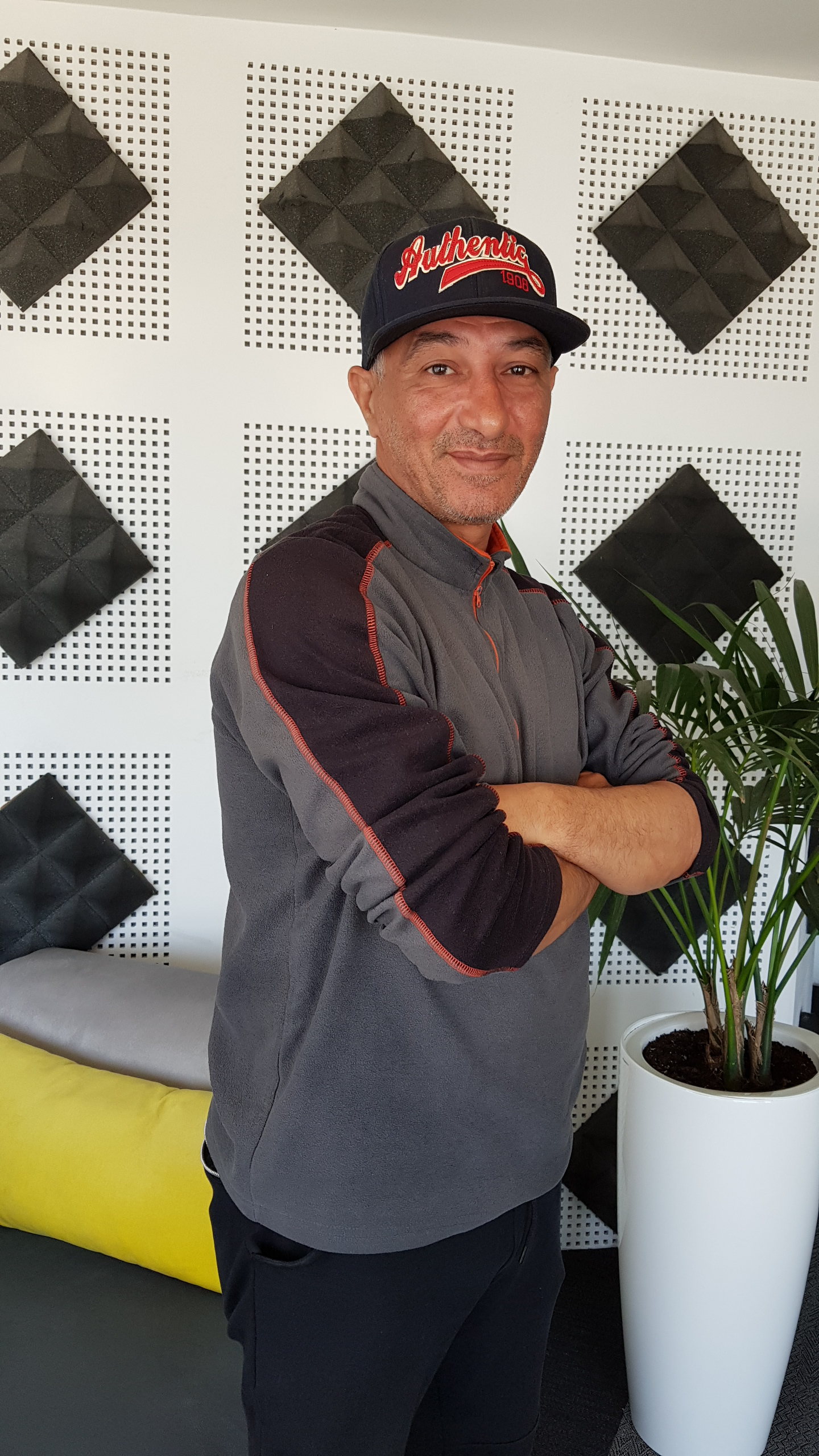
- Hababi in 2019.

Personal information
- Date of birth: 12 August 1967 (age 59)
- Place of birth: Khouribga, Morocco
- Height: 1.70 m (5 ft 7 in)
- Position: Midfielder

Senior career*
Years	Team	Apps	(Gls)
- OC Khouribga
- Étoile Sportive du Sahel

International career
1989–1997	Morocco	27	(5)
- * Club domestic league appearances and goals

El Arbi Hababi (born 12 August 1967) is a Moroccan former footballer who played at international level, competing at the 1994 FIFA World Cup.

== Career statistics ==
=== International goals ===
#	Date	Venue	Opponent	Score	Result	Competition
1.	19 August 1990	Stade Mohamed V, Casablanca, Morocco	Niger	2–0	Win	1992 African Cup of Nations qual.
2.	23 March 1994	Stade Josy Barthel, Luxembourg City, Luxembourg	Luxembourg	1–2	Win	Friendly
3.	17 January 1996	Stade Jules Ladoumègue, Vitrolles, France	Armenia	6–0	Win	Friendly
4.	17 January 1996	Stade Jules Ladoumègue, Vitrolles, France	Armenia	6–0	Win	Friendly
5.	9 November 1996	Prince Moulay Stadium, Rabat, Morocco	Sierra Leone	4–0	Win	1998 FIFA World Cup qualification
Correct as of 7 October 2015
