= Alphonse Tchami =

Cameroonian footballer (born 1971)

Personal information
- Full name: Alphonse Marie Tchami Djomaha
- Date of birth: 14 September 1971 (age 55)
- Place of birth: Batouri, Cameroon
- Height: 5 ft 11 in (1.80 m)
- Position: Striker

Senior career*
| Years | Team | Apps | (Gls) |
- Unisport Bafang
| 1992 | Vejle BK | 12 | (6) |
| 1992–1994 | Odense BK | 65 | (28) |
| 1994–1997 | Boca Juniors | 48 | (11) |
| 1997–1999 | Hertha BSC | 29 | (4) |
| 1999–2000 | Al-Wasl | | |
| 2000 | Dundee United | 3 | (0) |
| 2001 | Nice | 6 | (1) |
| 2001–2002 | Chernomorets | 4 | (0) |
| 2002–2003 | Shenyang Ginde | 9 | (1) |
| 2003 | Nejmeh | | |
| 2003–2005 | Épernay | 0 | (0) |

International career
| 1991–1998 | Cameroon | 42 | (13) |
- * Club domestic league appearances and goals

Alphonse Marie Tchami Djomaha (born 14 September 1971) is a Cameroonian former professional footballer who played as a striker. At international level, he represented Cameroon at the 1994 and 1998 FIFA World Cups.

== Club career ==
Born in Kekem, Tchami began his career in Cameroon with Unisport Bafang before moving to Danish club Vejle BK. In his short spell at Vejle he scored 8 goals in 15 games, but was unable to prevent the club being relegated. Tchami's spell at Vejle led to interest from other Danish clubs and Tchami eventually moved to Odense BK (OB). Tchami was a part of the OB team that defeated Real Madrid in the 1994–95 UEFA Cup third round by 4–3 on aggregate, earning a place in the quarter-finals.

Tchami joined Argentinian club Boca Juniors shortly after the 1994 FIFA World Cup. In total Tchami played 50 games and scored 11 goals for Boca. After three years he returned to Europe with German side Hertha BSC. Tchami spent two season with Hertha before a spell in the United Arab Emirates with Al-Wasl.

Tchami was on trial with Bolton Wanderers in July 2000 following his release, playing in friendly matches on Bolton's tour of Denmark, before signing for Dundee United in August. Tchami spent four months at the Scottish club, leaving in December after playing in four matches and failing to score. Nice was Tchami's next club, where he signed a short-term contract until the end of the season. In August 2001, Tchami left France - putting what was termed a "bad spell" behind him - and moved to Russian club Chernomorets, before moving again, this time to Shenyang Ginde in China. He signed for Lebanese club Nejmeh in September 2003 but left after less than three weeks, ending his career back in France with amateur side Épernay. His club career spanned twelve clubs in ten countries over four continents.

== International career ==
Tchami played in 57 matches for Cameroon and was a participant at the 1994 and 1998 FIFA World Cups, in addition to the 1996 African Cup of Nations.

== Personal life ==
Tchami holds Cameroonian and French nationalities. He is from a family of footballers. His three younger brothers also played professionally: Bertrand, former Grenoble Foot 38 and Stade de Reims player, Joël, and Hervé.

== Career statistics ==
Scores and results list Cameroon's goal tally first, score column indicates score after each Tchami goal.

List of international goals scored by Alphonse Tchami
| No. | Date | Venue | Opponent | Score | Result | Competition |
|---|---|---|---|---|---|---|
| 1 | 18 October 1992 | Stade Omnisports, Yaoundé, Cameroon | Swaziland | 2–0 | 5–0 | 1994 FIFA World Cup qualification |
| 2 | 10 January 1993 | Stade Tata Raphaël, Kinshasa, Zaire | Zaire | 2–0 | 2–1 | 1994 FIFA World Cup qualification |
| 3 | 18 April 1993 | Stade Omnisports, Yaoundé, Cameroon | Guinea | 1–0 | 2–0 | 1994 FIFA World Cup qualification |
| 4 | 18 April 1993 | Stade Omnisports, Yaoundé, Cameroon | Guinea | 3–1 | 2–0 | 1994 FIFA World Cup qualification |
| 5 | 11 July 1993 | Stade de l'Amitié, Cotonou, Benin | Benin | 1–0 | 3–0 | 1994 Africa Cup of Nations qualification |
| 6 | 18 January 1996 | FNB Stadium, Johannesburg, South Africa | Egypt | 2–1 | 2–1 | 1996 Africa Cup of Nations |
| 7 | 10 November 1996 | Stade de Kégué, Lomé, Togo | Togo | 1–0 | 4–2 | 1998 FIFA World Cup qualification |
| 8 | 10 November 1996 | Stade de Kégué, Lomé, Togo | Togo | 2–0 | 4–2 | 1998 FIFA World Cup qualification |
| 9 | 10 November 1996 | Stade de Kégué, Lomé, Togo | Togo | 3–1 | 4–2 | 1998 FIFA World Cup qualification |
| 10 | 7 February 1998 | Stade du 4 Août, Ouagadougou, Burkina Faso | Burkina Faso | 1–0 | 1–0 | 1998 Africa Cup of Nations |
| 11 | 11 February 1998 | Stade Municipal, Ouagadougou, Burkina Faso | Guinea | 1–0 | 2–2 | 1998 Africa Cup of Nations |
| 12 | 15 February 1998 | Stade Municipal, Ouagadougou, Burkina Faso | Algeria | 2–1 | 2–1 | 1998 Africa Cup of Nations |
| 13 | 31 May 1998 | Stade Josy Barthel, Luxembourg City, Luxembourg | Luxembourg | 2–0 | 2–0 | Friendly |
