= Mohamed Jabrane =

Moroccan footballer (born 1979)

Personal information
- Date of birth: 29 November 1979 (age 46)
- Height: 1.75 m (5 ft 9 in)
- Position: Forward

Senior career*
Years	Team	Apps	(Gls)
1997–2004	MAS Fez		
2004–2005	Moghreb Tétouan		
2005–2008	EGS Gafsa		
2008–2009	MAS Fez		
2009–2010	Wydad de Fès	1	(0)

International career
- Morocco U20
2002	Morocco	2	(2)
- * Club domestic league appearances and goals

Mohamed Jabrane (born 29 November 1979) is a retired Moroccan football striker. He was a squad member at the 1997 FIFA World Youth Championship.
