= Lim Kee Chong =

Mauritian football referee (born 1960)

An Yan Lim Lim Kee Chong (born May 15, 1960) is a retired Mauritian association football referee. He is mostly known for supervising two matches in the FIFA World Cup - a Group B first-round match between Brazil and Russia in 1994 and a Group G first-round match between Romania and Colombia in 1998. He was suspended following the 1998 World Cup.

In addition, Lim Kee Chong served as a referee for African Cup of Nations tournaments in 1992, 1994 (including the final match), 1996, 1998, and 2002. His other international events include the 1991 FIFA U-17 World Championship, the 1992 Olympic tournament, and the 1992 and 1995 King Fahd Cup tournaments. He officiated in qualifying matches for the 1994, 1998, 2002, and 2006 World Cups.

A customs officer during his career as a match official, he has since worked as referee coordinator for the Mauritius Football Association and a refereeing instructor for FIFA's development projects in Africa.
