= Neji Jouini =

Tunisian football referee

- Full name: Neji Jouini
- Born: August 12, 1949 (age 77); Tunisia

International
| Years | League | Role |
| 1990–1994 | FIFA-listed | Referee |

Neji Jouini (Arabic: ناجي الجويني; born 12 August 1949) is a former Tunisian football referee. He is known for having refereed three matches in the FIFA World Cup, one in 1990 and two in 1994. Jouini was the head of the Referees Association of Qatar Football Association until September 2023.
