= Abdeslam Laghrissi =

Moroccan footballer (born 1962)

Personal information
- Full name: Abdeslam Laghrissi
- Date of birth: 5 January 1962 (age 64)
- Place of birth: Ksar-el-Kebir, Morocco
- Height: 1.91 m (6 ft 3 in)
- Position: Forward

Youth career
- Nadi-El-Kasri

Senior career*
Years	Team	Apps	(Gls)
1982–1990	FAR Rabat		
1993–1994	Raja Casablanca		(4)
1994–1995	FAR Rabat		
1998–2000	Al-Suwaiq		

International career
1984–1995	Morocco	35	(17)
- * Club domestic league appearances and goals

Abdeslam Laghrissi (Arabic: عبد السلام الغريسي; born 5 January 1962), also known as Abdeslam El-Ghrissi, is a Moroccan former footballer.

== Club career ==
Laghrissi started his professional career in Moroccan side FAR Rabat. Early in the nineties he played in Qatar. Then he returned to Morocco where he played for Raja Casablanca and, for the second time, for FAR Rabat. He spent two years in Oman where he played for Al-Suwaiq before retiring in 2000.

== International career ==
He played for the Morocco national football team from 1983 to 1995. In 1984, he took part in 1984 Summer Olympics. In 1992, he was capped for the African Cup of Nations, and was a participant at the 1994 FIFA World Cup, when he played a match as a used substitute against Saudi Arabia.

== Personal honours ==
When playing for FAR Rabat, Laghrissi was the topscorer of the Moroccan premier division three times, in 1983, 1990 and 1995.
