= Leopold Sédar Senghor Stadium =

Football stadium in Dakar, Senegal

Coordinates: 14°44′48.10″N 17°27′7.25″W

Léopold Senghor Stadium
- Stade Léopold Senghor
- Leopold Senghor Stadium during an African Cup of Nations qualification match
- Interactive map of Léopold Senghor Stadium
- Full name: Léopold Sédar Senghor Stadium
- Former names: Stade de l'Amitié
- Location: Route de l’Aéroport de Yoff, Dakar
- Capacity: 40,000
- Surface: Grass
- Record attendance: 75,000 (Senegal vs Nigeria, 12 January 1992)

Construction
- Opened: 31 October 1985; 40 years ago
- Renovated: 2022–2025
- General contractors: China Henan International Cooperation Group Co., Ltd

Tenant
- Senegal national football team

Léopold Sédar Senghor Stadium, formerly the Stade de l'Amitie (English: Friendship Stadium), is a multi-purpose stadium in Dakar, Senegal.It is currently used mostly for football matches. It serves as a home ground of ASC Jeanne d'Arc and the Senegal national football team. It also has an athletics track, and is sometimes used for rugby union. The stadium holds 40,000. It was built in 1985 and named after Léopold Sédar Senghor, first president of Senegal (from 1960 to 1980).

The stadium's record attendance of 75,000 was set in 1992, in an association football match between the national football teams of Senegal and Nigeria.

== Overview ==
The stadium hosted the final match of the 1992 African Cup of Nations and the 1998 African Championships in Athletics.

In 2006 Norwegian band A-ha are one of the artists to perform at Football for Africa, Dakar, Senegal. This charity event, organised by Plan International in co-operation with Norwegian TV2 and the Norwegian Football association, takes place at the football stadium (capacity 50,000) after the football match between Norway and Senegal. The concert lasts for around 3 hours and features other international artists such as Lauryn Hill, Patti Smith, Youssou N'Dour, Angelique Kidjo and Alpha Blondy plus Norwegian artists Morten Abel and Mira Craig.

On 13 October 2012, a 2013 Africa Cup of Nations qualification match between Senegal and Ivory Coast was abandoned due to rioting at the stadium. Senegal were disqualified from the tournament as a result.

Preceded by Stade 5 Juillet 1962; Algiers	African Cup of Nations; Final Venue; 1992	Succeeded by Stade El Menzah; Tunis
