= Mohammed Lashaf =

Moroccan footballer

Personal information
- Date of birth: 7 October 1967 (age 59)
- Place of birth: Mons, Belgium
- Height: 1.82 m (6 ft 0 in)
- Position: Midfielder

Youth career
- LC Mesvinois

Senior career*
Years	Team	Apps	(Gls)
1987–1988	Anderlecht		
1988–1990	Racing Jet Wavre		
1990–1991	Antwerp	28	(7)
1991–1995	Standard Liège	34	(6)
1995–1996	Gueugnon	7	(0)
1999–2000	Racing Jet Wavre		

International career
1989–1993	Morocco	8	(2)
- * Club domestic league appearances and goals

Mohammed Lashaf (born 7 October 1967) is a Moroccan retired football midfielder.

Born in Belgium, Lashaf played for Antwerp and four seasons for Standard Liège. He was seriously injured in 1991 when Charleroi's Togolese defender Atty Affo tackled him from behind resulting in a broken leg.

In 2024, Lashaf worked as a bus driver.
