= Mohamed Samadi =

Moroccan footballer (born 1970)

Personal information
- Full name: Mohamed Aziz Samadi
- Date of birth: 21 March 1970 (age 56)
- Place of birth: Rabat, Morocco
- Height: 1.78 m (5 ft 10 in)
- Position: Midfielder

Senior career*
Years	Team	Apps	(Gls)
1990–2000	FAR Rabat		

International career
1991–1995	Morocco	16	(1)

Managerial career
- 2023: FAR Rabat
- * Club domestic league appearances and goals

Mohamed Aziz Samadi (Arabic: محمد عزيز الصمدي; born 21 March 1970) is a Moroccan football coach and former player.

== Playing career ==
Born in Rabat, Samadi played as a midfielder for FAR Rabat and at international level for Morocco, competing at the 1992 Summer Olympics and 1994 FIFA World Cup.

== Coaching career ==
In 2023, he coached FAR Rabat, the team where he spent the majority of his career.
