= Lahcen Abrami =

Moroccan footballer (born 1969)

Personal information
- Full name: Lahcen Abrami
- Date of birth: 31 December 1969 (age 56)
- Place of birth: Casablanca, Morocco
- Height: 1.78 m (5 ft 10 in)
- Position: Defender

Senior career*
Years	Team	Apps	(Gls)
1989–1998	Wydad Casablanca	?	(?)
1998–2000	Gençlerbirliği	39	(3)
2000–2003	Wydad Casablanca	42	(2)
2003–2004	Al-Wakrah	?	(?)
2004–2005	Wydad Casablanca	?	(?)
2005–2007	IR Tanger	?	(?)

International career
1991–2001	Morocco	52	(3)
- * Club domestic league appearances and goals

Lahcen Abrami (Arabic: لحسن أبرامي; born 31 December 1969 in Casablanca) is a retired Moroccan footballer. He played for several clubs, including Wydad Casablanca and Gençlerbirliği in Turkey.

Abrami played for the Morocco national football team and was a participant at the 1992 Summer Olympics and at the 1998 FIFA World Cup.

Abrami began playing in Raja Casablanca's youth system. Aged 17, he joined city rivals Wydad Casablanca where he would play club football until 2005.
