= Abdelmajid Bouyboud =

Moroccan footballer

Personal information
- Full name: Abdelmajid Bouyboud
- Date of birth: October 24, 1966 (age 59)
- Place of birth: Morocco
- Height: 1.77 m (5 ft 10 in)
- Position: Striker

Senior career*
Years	Team	Apps	(Gls)
1990–1994	Wydad Casablanca		
1994–1997	Belenenses	52	(6)
1999	Wuhan Hongtao	12	(0)

International career
1990–1997	Morocco	34	(3)
- * Club domestic league appearances and goals as of April 18, 2007

Abdelmajid Bouyboud (born 24 October 1966) is a Moroccan former football defender, who played for Belenenses in Portugal.

He was included in the Moroccan squad in the 1994 FIFA World Cup.
