= Rachid Daoudi =

Moroccan footballer (born 1966)

Personal information
- Date of birth: 21 February 1966 (age 60)
- Place of birth: Fez, Morocco
- Height: 1.78 m (5 ft 10 in)
- Position: Midfielder

Senior career*
| Years | Team | Apps | (Gls) |
| 1989–1995 | Wydad AC | | |
| 1995–1996 | Tirsense | 20 | (2) |
| 1997–1998 | Xerez | 27 | (2) |
| 1998–1999 | Al Ain FC | | |
| 1999–2001 | Al Wasl | | |
| 2001–2002 | Al-Ahli SC | | |
| 2002–2003 | Wydad AC | | |

International career
| 1990-2001 | Morocco | 38 | (7) |
- * Club domestic league appearances and goals

Rachid Daoudi (born 21 February 1966) is a Moroccan former professional footballer who played as a midfielder for clubs including Wydad AC, Segunda División side Xerez CD, Al Wasl F.C. and Al Ain FC in the United Arab Emirates. He played for the Morocco national team and was a participant at the 1994 FIFA World Cup.
