= Youssef Fertout =

Moroccan footballer (born 1970)

Personal information
- Date of birth: 7 July 1970 (age 56)
- Place of birth: Casablanca, Morocco
- Height: 1.80 m (5 ft 11 in)
- Position: Forward

Senior career*
Years	Team	Apps	(Gls)
1989–1995	Wydad Athletic Club	92	(54)
1995–1998	Belenenses	71	(12)
1998–2001	AZ Alkmaar	48	(11)

International career
1992–1998	Morocco	39	(12)

Managerial career
- 2012: Raja Beni Mellal
- 2012: IR Tangier
- 2013: Wydad AC (assistant)
- 2013–2014: Olympic Club Safi
- 2014–2015: Olympic Club Safi
- 2017: Chabab Rif Al Hoceima
- 2017–2018: MA Tétouan
- 2018–2019: Al Ahly Benghazi
- 2019: CR Khemis Zemamra
- * Club domestic league appearances and goals

Youssef Fertout (born 7 July 1970) is a Moroccan former professional footballer who played as a forward for Wydad Casablanca, CF Belenenses and AZ Alkmaar. At international level, he made 39 appearances scoring 12 goals for the Morocco national team and was a participant at the 1998 African Cup of Nations.

As of 2020 Fertout was the manager of RC Oued Zem.

== Honours ==
- CAF Champions League: 1992
- Botola: 1990, 1991, 1993
- Moroccan Throne Cup: 1989, 1994
