= Mohammed Chaouch =

Moroccan footballer (born 1966)

Personal information
- Date of birth: December 12, 1966 (age 59)
- Place of birth: Aklim, Morocco
- Height: 1.74 m (5 ft 9 in)
- Position: Striker

Senior career*
Years	Team	Apps	(Gls)
1986–1988	Kawkab Marrakech	26	(13)
1988–1990	Saint-Etienne	36	(5)
1990–1992	Istres	56	(29)
1992–1993	Metz	25	(6)
1993–1997	Nice	129	(30)
1997–1999	Laval	73	(10)
1999–2000	APOEL Nicosia		

International career
1986–1995	Morocco	71	(12)
- * Club domestic league appearances and goals

Mohamed Chaouch (Arabic: محمد شاوش; born December 12, 1966) is a Moroccan former professional footballer who played as a striker.

== Club career ==
Chaouch played a season for Metz and for Nice from 1993 to 1997. (Note: Mohammed Chaouch – French league stats at LFP – also available in French (archived))

== International career ==
Chaouch played several games for Morocco and represented his country in 9 FIFA World Cup qualification matches and played at the 1994 FIFA World Cup, scoring a goal against Saudi Arabia.

== Honours ==
Nice

- Coupe de France: 1997
