= 1992 African Cup of Nations squads =

List of footballers

Below is a list of squads used in the 1992 African Cup of Nations.

== Group A ==
=== Nigeria ===
Coach: (Netherlands) Clemens Westerhof

No.	Pos.	Player	Date of birth (age)	Caps	Club
16	GK	David Ngodigha	23 October 1962 (aged 29)		(Nigeria) ACB Lagos
1	GK	Alloysius Agu	12 July 1967 (aged 24)		(Netherlands) MVV Maastricht
22	GK	Ike Shorunmu	16 October 1967 (aged 24)		(Nigeria) Stationery Stores
2	DF	Reuben Agboola	30 May 1962 (aged 29)		(Wales) Swansea City
21	DF	Abdul Aminu	21 February 1965 (aged 26)		(Nigeria) El-Kanemi Warriors
18	DF	Ajibade Babalade	29 March 1972 (aged 19)		(Nigeria) Shooting Stars Ibadan
6	DF	Augustine Eguavoen	19 August 1965 (aged 26)		(Belgium) Kortrijk
4	DF	Stephen Keshi	23 January 1962 (aged 29)		(France) RC Strasbourg
5	DF	Uche Okechukwu	4 November 1967 (aged 24)		(Denmark) Brondby I.F.
3	DF	Nduka Ugbade	6 September 1969 (aged 22)		(Spain) Castellón
15	MF	Mutiu Adepoju	22 December 1970 (aged 21)		(Spain) Real Madrid Castilla
10	MF	Friday Ekpo	13 August 1969 (aged 22)		(Gabon) Mbilinga FC
7	MF	Finidi George	15 April 1971 (aged 20)		(Nigeria) Calabar Rovers
19	MF	John Ene Okon	15 March 1969 (aged 22)		(Nigeria) Calabar Rovers
12	MF	Thompson Oliha	4 October 1968 (aged 23)		(Nigeria) Iwuanyanwu Nationale
17	FW	Jonathan Akpoborie	20 October 1968 (aged 23)		(Germany) 1. FC Saarbrücken
20	FW	Dotun Alatishe	10 May 1968 (aged 23)		(Nigeria) Shooting Stars Ibadan
11	FW	Friday Elaho	24 November 1967 (aged 24)		(Denmark) Brondby I.F.
14	DF	Emeka Ezeugo	16 December 1965 (aged 26)		(Denmark) Lyngby Boldklub
13	FW	Victor Ikpeba	12 June 1973 (aged 18)		(Belgium) Liège
9	FW	Samson Siasia	14 August 1967 (aged 24)		(Belgium) K.S.C. Lokeren
8	FW	Rashidi Yekini	23 October 1963 (aged 28)		(Portugal) Vitória de Setúbal

=== Senegal ===
Coach: (France) Claude Le Roy

No.	Pos.	Player	Date of birth (age)	Caps	Club
16	GK	Khadim Faye	5 September 1970 (aged 21)		(Senegal) ASC Diaraf
	GK	Mamadou Salla			(Senegal) ASC Jeanne d'Arc
1	GK	Cheikh Seck	8 January 1958 (aged 34)		(Tunisia) Espérance
17	DF	Mamadou Mariem Diallo	2 March 1967 (aged 24)		(Senegal) Port Autonome
3	DF	Adolphe Mendy	16 January 1960 (aged 31)		(Senegal) ASC Jeanne d'Arc
	DF	Jean Mendy			(Senegal) ASC Diaraf
5	DF	Roger Mendy	8 February 1960 (aged 31)		(France) AS Monaco
	DF	Ibrahima N'Diaye	26 February 1964 (aged 27)		(Tunisia) Etoile du Sahel
20	DF	Mamadou Teuw	27 November 1959 (aged 32)		(Belgium) R. Charleroi S.C.
12	MF	Adama Cissé	21 March 1967 (aged 24)		(Senegal) ASC Diaraf
21	MF	Malick Fall	17 November 1968 (aged 23)		(France) Angers
8	MF	Oumar Gueye Sène	23 October 1959 (aged 32)		(France) Paris SG
2	MF	Aly Male	15 November 1970 (aged 21)		(Senegal) ASC Jeanne d'Arc
14	MF	Lamine N'Diaye	18 October 1956 (aged 35)		(France) Mulhouse
6	MF	Lamine Sagna	17 November 1969 (aged 22)		(Senegal) ASC Diaraf
10	FW	Jules Bocandé	25 November 1958 (aged 33)		(France) RC Lens
15	FW	Victor Diagne	5 July 1971 (aged 20)		(Senegal) ASC Diaraf
	FW	Mamadou Diarra	18 October 1970 (aged 21)		(Senegal) Port Autonome
9	FW	Alboury Lah	23 April 1966 (aged 25)		(France) Châteauroux
18	FW	Moussa N'Daw	10 October 1968 (aged 23)		(Morocco) Wydad Casablanca
11	FW	Souleymane Sané	26 February 1961 (aged 30)		(Germany) SG Wattenscheid 09
13	FW	Thierno Youm	17 April 1960 (aged 31)		(France) Nantes

=== Kenya ===
Coach: (Austria) Gerry Saurer

No.	Pos.	Player	Date of birth (age)	Caps	Club
1	GK	John Busolo	13 March 1965 (aged 26)		(Kenya) AFC Leopards
22	GK	Charles Bwire			(Kenya) AFC Leopards
	GK	Ken Kenyatta	22 November 1968 (aged 23)		(France) in Reunion
15	DF	Tobias Ochola	1963		(Kenya) Gor Mahia
3	DF	Francis Oduor	1971		(Kenya) AFC Leopards
	FW	Terry Onyango			Kenya Breweries
2	DF	Vitalis Owour			(Oman)
5	DF	George Sunguti			(Kenya) AFC Leopards
12	DF	Mickey Weche			(Oman)
13	MF	John Lukoye	1965		(Kenya) AFC Leopards
10	MF	Anthony Lwanga	20 March 1972 (aged 19)		(Kenya) AFC Leopards
	MF	James Mbwabi			(Kenya) Bandari
8	MF	Henry Nyandoro	20 October 1969 (aged 22)		(Kenya) Shabana Kisii
19	MF	Sammy Omollo	30 May 1970 (aged 21)		Kenya Breweries
	MF	Alfayo Odongo			(Kenya) Rivatex
16	FW	Elijah Koranga			(Kenya) Transcom
	FW	Henry Motego	21 May 1964 (aged 27)		(Oman) Al-Oruba
14	FW	Peter Mwololo			Kenya Breweries
17	FW	Simon Ndungu			(Kenya) Kisumu Postal
	FW	Allan Odhiambo	16 September 1971 (aged 20)		(Kenya) Gor Mahia
4	FW	David Odhiambo			(Kenya) Reunion
9	FW	Mike Okoth Origi	16 November 1967 (aged 24)		Kenya Breweries

== Group B ==
=== Cameroon ===
Coach: (France) Philippe Redon

No.	Pos.	Player	Date of birth (age)	Caps	Club
22	GK	William Andem	14 June 1968 (aged 23)		(Cameroon) Olympic Mvolyé
1	GK	Joseph-Antoine Bell	8 October 1954 (aged 37)		(France) AS Saint-Étienne
16	GK	Jacques Songo'o	17 March 1964 (aged 27)		(France) Toulon
15	DF	Hans Agbo	26 September 1967 (aged 24)		(Cameroon) Prévoyance Yaoundé
5	DF	Bertin Ebwelle	11 September 1962 (aged 29)		(Cameroon) Olympic Mvolyé
6	DF	Emmanuel Kundé	15 July 1956 (aged 35)		(Cameroon) Olympic Mvolyé
4	DF	Benjamin Massing	20 June 1962 (aged 29)		(Cameroon) Olympic Mvolyé
17	DF	Victor N'Dip-Akem	18 August 1967 (aged 24)		(Cameroon) Canon Yaoundé
3	DF	Jules Onana	12 July 1967 (aged 24)		(Cameroon) Canon Yaoundé
14	DF	Stephen Tataw	31 January 1961 (aged 30)		(Cameroon) Olympic Mvolyé
9	MF	Jacob Ewane	11 February 1967 (aged 24)		(Cameroon) Canon Yaoundé
19	MF	Roger Feutmba	31 October 1968 (aged 23)		(Belgium) K.V. Kortrijk
2	MF	André Kana-Biyik	1 September 1965 (aged 26)		(France) Le Havre
8	MF	Emile Mbouh	30 May 1966 (aged 25)		(Portugal) Benfica e Castelo Branco
10	MF	Louis-Paul Mfede	26 February 1961 (aged 30)		(Cameroon) Olympic Mvolyé
13	MF	Jean-Claude Pagal	15 September 1964 (aged 27)		(France) AS Saint-Étienne
18	MF	Guy Tapoko	25 December 1968 (aged 23)		(France) Stade Lavallois
12	FW	Érnest Ebongué	15 May 1962 (aged 29)		(Portugal) Varzim
11	FW	Eugène Ekéké	30 May 1960 (aged 31)		(France) Valenciennes
21	FW	Emmanuel Maboang Kessack	27 November 1968 (aged 23)		(Portugal) Portimonense
20	FW	Cyril Makanaky	28 June 1965 (aged 26)		(Spain) Málaga
7	FW	François Omam-Biyik	21 May 1966 (aged 25)		(France) Cannes

=== Zaire ===
Coach: Kalala Mukendi

No.	Pos.	Player	Date of birth (age)	Caps	Club
1	GK	Mpangi Merikani	4 April 1967 (aged 24)		SCOM Mikishi
	GK	Ngoie Taifan			FC Lupopo Lubumbashi
	GK	Diankolo Tomisi			AS Vita
5	DF	John Buana N'Galula	23 June 1968 (aged 23)		(Belgium) FC Boom
7	DF	Kabwe Kasongo	31 July 1970 (aged 21)		Lubumbashi Sport
6	DF	Epangala Lokose	20 April 1964 (aged 27)		AS Vita
	DF	Kasango Makongo			TP Mazembe
2	DF	Mbaki Makengo	13 April 1969 (aged 22)		(Belgium) Racing Jet Wavre
	DF	Tshibindi Muya			FC Lupopo Lubumbashi
4	DF	Danny Mansoni Ngombo	25 October 1963 (aged 28)		(Belgium) Germinal Ekeren
	MF	Lemba Basuala	3 March 1965 (aged 26)		(Portugal) Vitória de Guimarães
13	MF	Iyambo Mara Etshele	28 September 1968 (aged 23)		(France) Gazélec Ajaccio
16	MF	Jacques Kinkomba Kingambo	4 January 1962 (aged 30)		(Belgium) Sint-Truiden
	MF	Shimbula Mayanga			TP Mazembe
20	MF	Kabeya Mukanya	1 May 1968 (aged 23)		(Belgium) K.F.C. Lommel S.K.
19	MF	N'Dinga Mbote	11 September 1966 (aged 25)		(Portugal) Vitória de Guimarães
8	MF	Ekanza Simba	9 August 1969 (aged 22)		AS Vita
17	MF	Tueba Menayane	13 March 1963 (aged 28)		(Portugal) Farense
14	FW	Ngondola Assombalanga	4 June 1969 (aged 22)		AS Bilima
10	FW	Mbala Henri Balenga	17 November 1966 (aged 25)		(Belgium) K.A.A. Gent
11	FW	Andre Kona N'Gole	16 June 1970 (aged 21)		Lubumbashi Sport
15	FW	Tchang Ngombe			(France) Troyes

=== Morocco ===
Coach: (Germany) Werner Olk

No.	Pos.	Player	Date of birth (age)	Caps	Club
16	GK	Khalil Azmi	23 August 1964 (aged 27)		(Morocco) Wydad Casablanca
	GK	Abdelkader El Brazi	5 November 1964 (aged 27)		(Morocco) FAR Rabat
1	GK	Badou Zaki	2 April 1959 (aged 32)		(Spain) Mallorca
	DF	Lahcen Abrami	31 December 1969 (aged 22)		(Morocco) Wydad Casablanca
2	DF	Rachid Azzouzi	10 January 1971 (aged 21)		(Germany) MSV Duisburg
5	DF	Mouhcine Bouhlal	22 March 1970 (aged 21)		(Morocco) FAR Rabat
13	DF	Abdelmajid Bouyboud	24 October 1966 (aged 25)		(Morocco) Wydad Casablanca
	DF	Tahar El Khalej	16 June 1968 (aged 23)		(Morocco) Kawkab Marrakech
4	DF	Jilal Fadel	4 March 1964 (aged 27)		(Morocco) Wydad Casablanca
6	DF	Noureddine Naybet	10 February 1970 (aged 21)		(Morocco) Wydad Casablanca
8	MF	Aziz Bouderbala	26 December 1960 (aged 31)		(France) Olympique Lyonnais
9	MF	Mohammed Chaouch	12 December 1966 (aged 25)		(France) Istres
14	MF	Rachid Daoudi	21 February 1966 (aged 25)		(Morocco) Wydad Casablanca
15	MF	Hicham Dmaei	11 January 1971 (aged 21)		(Morocco) Kawkab Marrakech
17	MF	Mouloud Moudakkar	5 March 1970 (aged 21)		(Morocco) US Sidi Kacem
	MF	Driss Mrabet	29 January 1967 (aged 24)		(Morocco) IR Tanger
12	MF	Khalid Raghib	22 September 1969 (aged 22)		(Morocco) RS Settat
11	FW	Abdeslam Laghrissi	5 January 1962 (aged 30)		(Morocco) FAR Rabat
	FW	Hassan Nader	8 July 1965 (aged 26)		(Spain) Mallorca
	FW	Aziz Ouzougate	25 January 1965 (aged 26)		(Morocco) Olympique Casablanca
7	FW	Fakhreddine Rajhy	3 October 1960 (aged 31)		(Morocco) Wydad Casablanca
10	FW	Said Rokbi	20 October 1969 (aged 22)		(Morocco) RS Settat

== Group C ==
=== Ivory Coast ===
Coach: Yeo Martial

No.	Pos.	Player	Date of birth (age)	Caps	Club
22	GK	Ali Doumbia	14 January 1962 (aged 29)		(Ivory Coast) Africa Sports
1	GK	Alain Gouaméné	15 June 1966 (aged 25)		(Morocco) Raja Casablanca
16	GK	Losseni Konaté	29 December 1972 (aged 19)		(Ivory Coast) ASEC Abidjan
2	DF	Basile Aka Kouamé	6 April 1963 (aged 28)		(Ivory Coast) ASEC Abidjan
20	DF	Lassina Dao	6 February 1971 (aged 20)		(Ivory Coast) ASEC Abidjan
3	DF	Arsène Hobou	30 October 1967 (aged 24)		(Ivory Coast) ASEC Abidjan
12	DF	Georges Lignon	29 December 1968 (aged 23)		(Ivory Coast) Africa Sports
4	DF	Alassane Ouattara	17 June 1968 (aged 23)		(Ivory Coast) Africa Sports
5	DF	Lué Rufin	5 January 1968 (aged 24)		(Ivory Coast) Africa Sports
19	DF	Sam Abouo	26 December 1973 (aged 18)		(Ivory Coast) ASEC Abidjan
6	DF	Sékana Diaby	10 August 1968 (aged 23)		(France) Brest
8	MF	Oumar Ben Salah	2 July 1964 (aged 27)		(France) Le Mans
7	MF	Saint-Joseph Gadji-Celi	1 May 1961 (aged 30)		(Ivory Coast) ASEC Abidjan
14	MF	Lucien Kassy-Kouadio	12 December 1963 (aged 28)		(Ivory Coast) ASEC Abidjan
17	MF	Serge-Alain Maguy	20 October 1970 (aged 21)		(Ivory Coast) Africa Sports
15	MF	Didier Otokoré	26 March 1969 (aged 22)		(France) Auxerre
21	MF	Donald-Olivier Sié	3 April 1970 (aged 21)		(Ivory Coast) ASEC Abidjan
18	FW	Eugène Beugré Yago	15 December 1969 (aged 22)		(Ivory Coast) Africa Sports
11	FW	Youssouf Fofana	26 July 1966 (aged 25)		(France) AS Monaco
9	FW	Joël Tiéhi	12 June 1964 (aged 27)		(France) Le Havre
10	FW	Abdoulaye Traoré	4 March 1967 (aged 24)		(Ivory Coast) ASEC Abidjan
13	FW	Moussa Traoré	25 December 1971 (aged 20)		(France) Olympique Alès

=== Congo ===
Coach: Noël Minga

No.	Pos.	Player	Date of birth (age)	Caps	Club
	GK	Bruno Matingou Mouanga			Unattached
16	GK	Ambroise Ngoya	2 March 1964 (aged 27)		(Republic of the Congo) CARA Brazzaville
1	GK	Christian Samba	26 March 1971 (aged 20)		(Republic of the Congo) Diables Noirs
17	DF	Florent Baloki	10 October 1971 (aged 20)		(Republic of the Congo) Diables Noirs
	DF	Appolinaire Bouketo			(Republic of the Congo) Patronage Sainte-Anne
2	DF	Pierre Mbongo			(Republic of the Congo) Inter Club Brazzaville
13	DF	Célestin Mouyabi	30 July 1957 (aged 34)		Unattached
9	DF	Maurice Ntounou	13 September 1972 (aged 19)		(Republic of the Congo) Kotoko M'Foa
5	DF	Laurent Nsombi	25 September 1967 (aged 24)		(Republic of the Congo) Diables Noirs
4	DF	Yvon Okemba	5 February 1966 (aged 25)		(Republic of the Congo) Inter Club Brazzaville
	MF	Godfrey Gaylor Bongo			(Republic of the Congo) Inter Club Brazzaville
	MF	Jean-Claude Mbemba	2 December 1963 (aged 28)		(Hungary) Vasas
	MF	Jean-Michel Mbemba	8 November 1962 (aged 29)		(France) AS Cherbourg
12	MF	Sylvain Moukassa	21 April 1973 (aged 18)		(Republic of the Congo) Diables Noirs
10	MF	Jean-Jacques Ndomba	12 January 1960 (aged 32)		(France) Chamois Niortais
14	MF	Icertain Tsoumou			(Republic of the Congo) Inter Club Brazzaville
6	MF	Simplice Nzamba			Unattached
19	FW	Aristide Amouzoud	20 April 1969 (aged 22)		(Republic of the Congo) Etoile du Congo
	FW	François Makita	6 May 1963 (aged 28)		(France) RC Épernay Champagne
20	FW	Cesaire Babyllas Malonga			Unattached
15	FW	Anges Ngapy	2 March 1963 (aged 28)		(Belgium) R.F.C. Seraing
11	FW	Pierre Tchibota-Zaou	5 December 1968 (aged 23)		(Republic of the Congo) AS Cheminots

=== Algeria ===
Coach: Abdelhamid Kermali

No.	Pos.	Player	Date of birth (age)	Caps	Club
16	GK	Kamel Kadri	19 November 1963 (aged 28)		(Algeria) MC Alger
1	GK	Mounir Laouar	25 March 1963 (aged 28)		(Algeria) MO Constantine
22	GK	Antar Osmani	22 June 1960 (aged 31)		(Algeria) ES Sétif
3	DF	Kamel Adjas	3 January 1963 (aged 29)		(Algeria) ES Sétif
5	DF	Omar Belatoui	4 September 1969 (aged 22)		(Algeria) MC Oran
4	DF	Ali Benhalima	21 January 1962 (aged 29)		(Spain) Lleida
20	DF	Fodil Megharia	23 May 1961 (aged 30)		(Tunisia) Club Africain
2	DF	Mourad Rahmouni	3 December 1963 (aged 28)		(Algeria) JS Kabylie
15	DF	Liazid Sandjak	11 September 1966 (aged 25)		(France) Paris SG
12	DF	Mohamed Tribèche	14 June 1964 (aged 27)		(Algeria) ES Sétif
14	MF	Tahar Cherif El-Ouazzani	10 July 1967 (aged 24)		(Turkey) Aydınspor
11	MF	Rabah Madjer (c)	15 February 1958 (aged 33)		Qatar SC
6	MF	Mahieddine Meftah	26 September 1968 (aged 23)		(Algeria) JS Kabylie
18	MF	Moussa Saïb	6 March 1969 (aged 22)		(Algeria) JS Kabylie
19	MF	Abdelhafid Tasfaout	11 February 1969 (aged 22)		(Algeria) MC Oran
10	FW	Ali Bouafia	5 August 1964 (aged 27)		(France) Olympique Lyonnais
7	FW	Nacer Bouiche	16 May 1963 (aged 28)		(France) Red Star Saint-Ouen
13	FW	Youssef Haraoui	12 May 1965 (aged 26)		(Czech Republic) Slovan Bratislava
8	FW	Hakim Medane	5 September 1966 (aged 25)		(Portugal) Famalicão
9	FW	Djamel Menad	22 July 1960 (aged 31)		(Portugal) Famalicão
17	FW	Mohamed Rahem	21 June 1970 (aged 21)		(Algeria) USM El Harrach

== Group D ==
=== Ghana ===
Coach: (Germany) Otto Pfister

No.	Pos.	Player	Date of birth (age)	Caps	Club
1	GK	Edward Ansah	1 February 1963 (aged 28)		(Ghana) Ashanti Gold
16	GK	Isaac Salifu Ansah	27 September 1963 (aged 28)		(Ghana) Hearts of Oak
22	GK	Abubakari Damba	30 December 1968 (aged 23)		(Ghana) Great Olympics
19	DF	Emmanuel Ampeah	22 April 1968 (aged 23)		(Ghana) Asante Kotoko
5	DF	Nil Darko Ankrah			(Ghana) Great Olympics
3	DF	James Kwesi Appiah	30 June 1960 (aged 31)		(Ghana) Asante Kotoko
14	DF	Emmanuel Armah	22 April 1968 (aged 23)		(Ghana) Hearts of Oak
20	DF	Isaac Asare	1 September 1974 (aged 17)		(Belgium) Anderlecht
2	DF	Anthony Baffoe	25 May 1965 (aged 26)		(Germany) Fortuna Düsseldorf
21	DF	Stephen Frimpong Manso	15 May 1959 (aged 32)		(Ghana) Asante Kotoko
17	MF	Stanley Aborah, Sr.	25 August 1969 (aged 22)		Austria Wien
4	DF	Mohammed Gargo	19 June 1975 (aged 16)		(Italy) Torino
6	MF	Samuel Opoku Nti	23 January 1961 (aged 30)		(Switzerland) FC Glarus
8	MF	Nii Lamptey	16 December 1974 (aged 17)		(Belgium) Anderlecht
10	MF	Abedi Pele	5 November 1962 (aged 29)		(France) Olympique de Marseille
12	FW	Windsor Koffi Abrey			(Ghana) Great Olympics
7	MF	Sarfo Gyamfi	17 July 1967 (aged 24)		(Austria) Swarovski Tirol
13	FW	Richard Naawu	5 February 1971 (aged 20)		(Germany) Waldhof Mannheim
11	FW	Ali Ibrahim Pelé	1 September 1969 (aged 22)		(Germany) SG Wattenscheid 09
15	FW	Prince Polley	4 May 1969 (aged 22)		(Belgium) Germinal Ekeren
18	FW	Yaw Preko	8 September 1974 (aged 17)		(Belgium) Anderlecht
9	FW	Tony Yeboah	6 June 1966 (aged 25)		(Germany) Eintracht Frankfurt

=== Zambia ===
Coach: Samuel Ndhlovu

No.	Pos.	Player	Date of birth (age)	Caps	Club
1	GK	David Chabala	2 February 1960 (aged 31)		(Argentina) Argentinos Juniors
16	GK	Richard Mwanza	5 May 1959 (aged 32)		(Zambia) Kabwe Warriors
	GK	Stephen Zimba	5 May 1968 (aged 23)		(Zambia) Nchanga Rangers
13	DF	Whiteson Changwe	19 October 1964 (aged 27)		(Zambia) Kabwe Warriors
4	DF	Samuel Chomba	5 January 1964 (aged 28)		(Zambia) Kabwe Warriors
15	DF	Ashious Melu	6 June 1957 (aged 34)		(Austria) Favoritner AC
5	DF	Eston Mulenga	7 August 1967 (aged 24)		(Zambia) Nkana Red Devils
2	DF	John Soko	5 May 1968 (aged 23)		(Zambia) Power Dynamos
3	DF	Robert Watiyakeni	18 October 1969 (aged 22)		(Zambia) Power Dynamos
	MF	Patrick Banda	28 January 1974 (aged 17)		(Zambia) Profound Warriors
	MF	Wisdom Mumba Chansa	17 April 1964 (aged 27)		(Zambia) Power Dynamos
	MF	Harrison Chongo	5 June 1969 (aged 22)		(Zambia) Mufulira Wanderers
6	MF	Derby Makinka	5 September 1965 (aged 26)		(Zambia) Profound Warriors
12	MF	Linos Makwaza	4 December 1965 (aged 26)		(Zambia) Power Dynamos
	MF	Mwenya Matete			(Zambia) Konkola Blades
19	MF	Maybin Mugaiwa			(Zambia) Kabwe Warriors
11	FW	Kalusha Bwalya	16 August 1963 (aged 28)		(Netherlands) PSV Eindhoven
17	FW	Beston Chambeshi	4 April 1960 (aged 31)		(Zambia) Nkana Red Devils
8	FW	Webster Chikabala	27 March 1965 (aged 26)		(Belgium) Eendracht Aalst
9	FW	Gibby Mbasela	24 October 1962 (aged 29)		(Zambia) Nkana Red Devils
14	FW	Pearson Mwanza	1 January 1968 (aged 24)		(Zambia) Power Dynamos
7	FW	Timothy Mwitwa	21 May 1968 (aged 23)		(Zambia) Kabwe Warriors

=== Egypt ===
Coach: Mahmoud El-Gohary

No.	Pos.	Player	Date of birth (age)	Caps	Club
21	GK	Saafane El-Saghir	7 January 1968 (aged 24)		(Egypt) Ismaily SC
22	GK	Khaled Moustafa			(Egypt) Al-Olympi
1	GK	Ahmed Shobair	28 September 1960 (aged 31)		(Egypt) Al Ahly
12	DF	Fawzi Gamal	23 October 1966 (aged 25)		(Egypt) Ismaily SC
2	DF	Ibrahim Hassan	10 August 1966 (aged 25)		(Switzerland) Neuchâtel Xamax
15	DF	Ayman Ragab	1967		(Egypt) Ismaily SC
13	DF	Ahmed Ramzy	25 July 1965 (aged 26)		(Egypt) Al-Zamalek
4	DF	Hany Ramzy	10 March 1969 (aged 22)		(Switzerland) Neuchâtel Xamax
5	DF	Hesham Yakan	10 August 1962 (aged 29)		(Egypt) Al-Zamalek
3	DF	Rabie Yassin	7 September 1960 (aged 31)		(Egypt) Al Ahly
14	MF	Mohamed Azima	17 October 1968 (aged 23)		(Germany) Fortuna Köln
8	MF	Magdi Abdelghani	27 July 1959 (aged 32)		(Portugal) Beira Mar
20	MF	Ahmed El-Kass	8 July 1965 (aged 26)		(Egypt) Al-Olympi
6	MF	Ashraf Kasem	25 July 1966 (aged 25)		(Egypt) Al-Zamalek
11	MF	Tarek Soliman	24 January 1962 (aged 29)		(Egypt) Al-Masry
16	MF	Magdy Tolba	24 February 1964 (aged 27)		(Greece) PAOK
7	MF	Ismail Youssef	26 June 1964 (aged 27)		(Egypt) Al-Zamalek
10	FW	Gamal Abdelhamid	24 November 1957 (aged 34)		(Egypt) Al-Zamalek
18	FW	Mohamed Salah Abo Greisha	1 January 1970 (aged 22)		(Egypt) Ismaily SC
19	FW	El-Sayed Eid	27 June 1966 (aged 25)		(Egypt) Al-Masry
17	FW	Khaled Eid	29 March 1964 (aged 27)		(Egypt) Ghazl Al-Mehalla
9	FW	Hossam Hassan	10 August 1966 (aged 25)		(Switzerland) Neuchâtel Xamax
