= 1992 African Cup of Nations qualification =

Football tournament

This page details the qualifying process qualifying for the 1992 African Cup of Nations in Senegal. Senegal, as hosts, and Algeria, as title holders, qualified automatically.

== Preliminary round ==
Team 1	Agg.	Team 2	1st leg	2nd leg
Mauritania	3–2	Gambia	2–0	1–2

18 May 1990

Mauritania	2–0	Gambia

Stade Olympique, Nouakchott
3 June 1990

Gambia	2–1	Mauritania

Independence Stadium, Bakau

Mauritania won 3–2 on aggregate.

== Qualifying round ==
=== Group 1 ===
Team	Pld	W	D	L	GF	GA	GD	Pts
Cameroon	6	3	3	0	5	1	+4	9
Sierra Leone	6	2	2	2	5	4	+1	6
Guinea	6	2	2	2	5	5	0	6
Mali	6	0	3	3	2	7	−5	3

19 August 1990

Cameroon	0–0	Mali

Ahmadou Ahidjo Stadium, Yaoundé
Attendance: 8,000
19 August 1990

Guinea	1–2	Sierra Leone
Sylla 70'		Deen 2'; Karbho 13'

Stade du 28 Septembre, Conakry
Attendance: 18,000

1 September 1990

Sierra Leone	1–1	Cameroon
Brimah 25'		Belle-Belle 50'

National Stadium, Freetown
Referee: ... (Gambia)
2 September 1990

Mali	1–1	Guinea
Diallo 40'		Yansané 70'

Stade Modibo Kéïta, Bamako
Attendance: 11,000

14 April 1991

Guinea	0–0	Cameroon

Stade du 28 Septembre, Conakry
Attendance: 41,000
Referee: Pierre Alain Mounguengui (Gabon)
14 April 1991

Mali	0–0	Sierra Leone

Stade Modibo Keïta, Bamako
Attendance: 4,000

28 April 1991

Mali	0–2 Abandoned after 86'	Cameroon
		Ewané 68'; Omam-Biyik 86'

Stade Modibo Keïta, Bamako
Attendance: 40,000
Referee: Rachid Medjiba (Algeria)
28 April 1991

Sierra Leone	0–1	Guinea
		Touré 33'

National Stadium, Freetown
Attendance: 20,000

14 July 1991

Cameroon	1–0	Sierra Leone
Ekéké 84'

Ahmadou Ahidjo Stadium, Yaoundé
Attendance: 60,000
Referee: Omer Yengo (Congo)
14 July 1991

Guinea	2–1	Mali
Camara 17'; Titi Camara 70'		Coulibaly 75'

Stade du 28 Septembre, Conakry
Attendance: 38,000

28 July 1991

Cameroon	1–0	Guinea
Omam-Biyik 10'

Ahmadou Ahidjo Stadium, Yaoundé
Referee: Louis Laryea (Ghana)
28 July 1991

Sierra Leone	2–0	Mali
Goal

National Stadium, Freetown

=== Group 2 ===
Team	Pld	W	D	L	GF	GA	GD	Pts
Egypt	6	3	3	0	13	5	+8	9
Tunisia	6	3	3	0	10	5	+5	9
Chad	6	2	2	2	6	7	−1	6
Ethiopia	6	0	0	6	0	12	−12	0

17 August 1990

Egypt	2–0	Ethiopia
Ramzy 61'; H. Hassan 85'

Cairo International Stadium, Cairo
19 August 1990

Tunisia	2–1	Chad
Abid 27'; Rouissi 82'		N'Doram 17'

Stade El Menzah, Tunis

2 September 1990

Chad	0–0	Egypt

Stade Omnisports Idriss Mahamat Ouya, Ndjamena
18 November 1990

Ethiopia	0–2	Tunisia
		Mahjoubi 39'; Rouissi 41'

Addis Ababa Stadium, Addis Ababa

Following this match, all of Ethiopia's players and coaching staff were fired, forcing the team to withdraw. The remaining matches of Ethiopia were all awarded 2–0 to the opponents.

14 April 1991

Tunisia	2–2	Egypt
Mahjoubi 44', 89'		Ramzy 6'; I. Hassan 47'

Stade El Menzah, Tunis
Attendance: 35,000
Referee: Abdelali Naciri (Morocco)
14 April 1991

Ethiopia	0–2 (awarded)	Chad

28 April 1991

Ethiopia	0–2 (awarded)	Egypt

28 April 1991

Chad	0–0	Tunisia

Stade Omnisports Idriss Mahamat Ouya, Ndjamena
Attendance: 5,000

12 July 1991

Egypt	5–1	Chad
I. Hassan 34'; Ramzy 56', 58'; H. Hassan 67'; Ramzy 82'		Touré 18'

Cairo International Stadium, Cairo
Attendance: 50,000
Referee: Mohamed Bahar (Morocco)
12 July 1991

Tunisia	2–0 (awarded)	Ethiopia

26 July 1991

Egypt	2–2	Tunisia
Youssef 44'; Abdelghani 66'		Mahjoubi 50', 53'

Cairo International Stadium, Cairo
Attendance: 65,000
Referee: Abderrahmane Bergui (Algeria)
26 July 1991

Chad	2–0 (awarded)	Ethiopia

Chad

=== Group 3 ===
Team	Pld	W	D	L	GF	GA	GD	Pts
Ivory Coast	6	5	0	1	9	3	+6	10
Morocco	6	4	0	2	11	4	+7	8
Niger	6	3	0	3	9	5	+4	6
Mauritania	6	0	0	6	1	18	−17	0
Liberia (W)	0	–	–	–	–	–	—	0

(W) Withdrew
19 August 1990

Ivory Coast	2–0	Mauritania
Hobou 34' (pen.); Sié 57'

Stade Félix Houphouët-Boigny, Abidjan
Referee: Hugues-Joseph Mongbo (Benin)
19 August 1990

Morocco	2–0	Niger
Hababi 18' (pen.); Laghrissi 89'

Stade Mohammed V, Casablanca
Referee: Messaoud Koussa (Algeria)

2 September 1990

Morocco	4–0	Mauritania
Nader 9'; Bouderbala 40'; Raghib 45'; Laghrissi 63'

Stade Mohammed V, Casablanca
Referee: Habib Akrout (Tunisia)
30 September 1990

Niger	0–1	Ivory Coast
		Traoré

Stade Général-Seyni-Kountché, Niamey
Referee: Issaka Diallo (Mali)

14 October 1990

Niger	7–1	Mauritania
Dwaye 7', 62', 78', 79'; Lambo 46', 48'; Gabde 86'		Seck 10'

Stade Général-Seyni-Kountché, Niamey
Attendance: 17,000
13 January 1991

Morocco	3–1	Ivory Coast
Laghrissi 9', 72'; Lashaf 48'		Ouattara 77'

Moulay Abdellah Stadium, Rabat

27 January 1991

Mauritania	0–2 (awarded)	Ivory Coast

Nouakchott

Awarded 0–2 as Mauritania withdrew

27 January 1991

Niger	1–0	Morocco
Douka 19'

Stade Général-Seyni-Kountché, Niamey
Attendance: 25,000
Referee: Kindner Ahmat (Chad)

12 April 1991

Mauritania	0–2	Morocco
		Laghrissi 46'; Bouderbala 66'

Stade Olympique, Nouakchott
Attendance: 8,000
Referee: Alhagi Faye (Gambia)
30 April 1991

Ivory Coast	1–0	Niger
Traoré 27' (pen.)

Stade Félix Houphouët-Boigny, Abidjan
Attendance: 40,000

26 July 1991

Mauritania	0–1	Niger
		Goal

Stade Olympique, Nouakchott
28 July 1991

Ivory Coast	2–0	Morocco
Dao 24'; Traoré 52'

Stade Félix Houphouët-Boigny, Abidjan
Referee: Badou Jasseh (Gambia)

=== Group 4 ===
Team	Pld	W	D	L	GF	GA	GD	Pts
Ghana	8	5	2	1	11	2	+9	12
Nigeria	8	4	3	1	15	3	+12	11
Burkina Faso	8	4	1	3	10	13	−3	9
Togo	8	2	2	4	4	9	−5	6
Benin	8	0	2	6	2	15	−13	2

19 August 1990

Burkina Faso	2–0	Benin
Ilboudo 20'; Kadeba 70'

Stade du 4 Août, Ouagadougou
19 August 1990

Nigeria	3–0	Togo
Okechukwu 58'; Amokachi 80'; Lawal 87'

Surulere Stadium, Lagos
Referee: Badara Sène (Senegal)

1 September 1990

Ghana	1–0	Nigeria
Saara-Mensah 32'

Baba Yara Stadium, Kumasi
Referee: Célestin N'Cho (Ivory Coast)
2 September 1990

Burkina Faso	2–0	Togo
Ilboudo 48'; Fofana 60'

Stade du 4 Août, Ouagadougou

30 September 1990

Benin	0–1	Nigeria
		Jatau 55'

Stade de l'Amitié, Cotonou
Referee: Kabuya Kalumba (Zaire)
30 September 1990

Togo	0–1	Ghana
		Saara-Mensah 46'

Stade de Kégué, Lomé
Referee: Kouakou N'Dri (Ivory Coast)

14 October 1990

Benin	1–1	Togo
Dossou-Gbété 65'		Djogou 30'

Stade de l'Amitié, Cotonou
14 October 1990

Ghana	2–0	Burkina Faso
Addo 10'; Polley 82'

Ohene Djan Stadium, Accra
Referee: Omer Yengo (Congo)

13 January 1991

Burkina Faso	1–1	Nigeria
Ouattara 24'		Ekpo 87'

Stade du 4 Août, Ouagadougou
13 January 1991

Ghana	4–0	Benin
Polley 8', 44'; Armah 16'; Naawu 60'

Ohene Djan Stadium, Accra
Referee: Paul-Alain Hioba-Hioba (Cameroon)

27 January 1991

Benin	1–2	Burkina Faso
Dossou-Gbété 43'		Bakadou 9', 22'

Stade de l'Amitié, Cotonou
Attendance: 12,000
27 January 1991

Togo	0–0	Nigeria

Stade de Kégué, Lomé
Attendance: 8,000
Referee: Fodé Capi Camara (Guinea)

13 April 1991

Nigeria	0–0	Ghana

Surulere Stadium, Lagos
Attendance: 23,000
21 April 1991

Togo	1–0	Burkina Faso
Goal

Stade de Kégué, Lomé

27 April 1991

Nigeria	3–0	Benin
Siasia 5'; Ekpo 17'; Amokachi 28'

Surulere Stadium, Lagos
Attendance: 20,000
Referee: Modibo N'Diaye (Mali)
29 April 1991

Ghana	2–0	Togo
Lamptey 43'; Baffoe 76'

Ohene Djan Stadium, Accra
Attendance: 40,000

13 July 1991

Burkina Faso	2–1	Ghana
Ilboudo 21'; Ouattara 87'		Tetteh 17'

Stade du 4 Août, Ouagadougou
Attendance: 18,000
Referee: Idrissa Sarr (Mauritania)
14 July 1991

Togo	2–0	Benin
Amegnizin 55'; Fiawoo 70' (pen.)

Stade de Kégué, Lomé
Attendance: 20,000

27 July 1991

Nigeria	7–1	Burkina Faso
Yekini 13', 69', 71', 80'; Siasia 14'; Elahor 74'; Finidi 88'		Touré 20'

Surulere Stadium, Lagos
Referee: Karim Camara (Guinea)
28 July 1991

Benin	0–0	Ghana

Stade de l'Amitié, Cotonou
Referee: ... (Sierra Leone)

=== Group 5 ===
Team	Pld	W	D	L	GF	GA	GD	Pts
Zambia	6	4	1	1	11	4	+7	9
Madagascar	5	2	2	1	3	2	+1	6
Swaziland	5	1	2	2	4	9	−5	4
Angola	6	0	3	3	3	6	−3	3

18 August 1990

Zambia	5–0	Swaziland
Chansa 39'; Chikabala 40'; Muselepete 54'; Mbasela 70'; Changwe 84'

Independence Stadium, Lusaka
Referee: Macnever Mang'anda (Malawi)
19 August 1990

Angola	0–1	Madagascar
		Randrianaivo 60'

Estádio da Cidadela, Luanda

1 September 1990

Swaziland	1–1	Angola
Terblanche 89'		Chico 10'

Somhlolo National Stadium, Lobamba
1 September 1990

Madagascar	0–0	Zambia

Mahamasina Municipal Stadium, Antananarivo

14 April 1991

Angola	1–2	Zambia
Saavedra 62'		Bwalya 55'; Mbasela 87'

Estádio da Cidadela, Luanda
Attendance: 15,000
Referee: Bester Kalombo (Malawi)
14 April 1991

Swaziland	0–1	Madagascar
		Kelly 16'

Somhlolo National Stadium, Lobamba
Attendance: 3,500

28 April 1991

Swaziland	2–1	Zambia
Tito 44'; Tholeni 50'		Makinka 60'

Somhlolo National Stadium, Lobamba
Referee: ... (Mozambique)
4 May 1991

Madagascar	0–0	Angola

Mahamasina Municipal Stadium, Antananarivo
Attendance: 12,000

14 July 1991

Zambia	2–1	Madagascar
Musonda 20'; Bwalya 38'		Henry 49'

Independence Stadium, Lusaka
Attendance: 50,000
Referee: Charles Masembe (Uganda)
15 July 1991

Angola	1–1	Swaziland
Felito 40' (pen.)		Matse 48'

Estádio da Cidadela, Luanda
Attendance: 20,000

28 July 1991

Zambia	1–0	Angola
Musonda 89'

Independence Stadium, Lusaka
Referee: Wilfred Mukuna (Zimbabwe)
28 July 1991

Madagascar	n/p	Swaziland

Antananarivo

=== Group 6 ===
Team	Pld	W	D	L	GF	GA	GD	Pts
Kenya	4	2	0	2	4	4	0	4
Mozambique	4	2	0	2	3	3	0	4
Sudan	4	2	0	2	3	3	0	4
Mauritius (W)	0	–	–	–	–	–	—	0

(W) Withdrew
17 August 1990

Sudan	1–0	Mozambique
Aatif Al-Quoz 85'

Khartoum Stadium, Khartoum
Referee: Selemani Tambwe (Burundi)

2 September 1990

Mozambique	2–1	Kenya
Nico 55'; Nando 85'		Mutua 51'

Estádio da Machava, Maputo
Referee: Phuru Liphoto (Lesotho)

14 April 1991

Sudan	1–0	Kenya
Nadir Mansour 8'

Khartoum Stadium, Khartoum
Attendance: 7,000
Referee: Bekele Kidane (Ethiopia)

28 April 1991

Mozambique	1–0	Sudan
Zainadine 30'

Estádio da Machava, Maputo
Attendance: 38,000
Referee: Ali Kazem (Libya)

14 July 1991

Kenya	1–0	Mozambique
Mwololo 32'

Nyayo National Stadium, Nairobi
Attendance: 20,000

28 July 1991

Kenya	2–1	Sudan
Motego 10'; Mike 76'		Fathelrahman Santo 87'

Moi International Sports Centre, Nairobi
Referee: Christopher Musaabi Yolisigira (Uganda)

=== Group 7 ===
Team	Pld	W	D	L	GF	GA	GD	Pts
Congo	4	3	1	0	7	3	+4	7
Zimbabwe	4	1	2	1	8	6	+2	4
Malawi	4	0	1	3	3	9	−6	1
Seychelles (W)	0	–	–	–	–	–	—	0

(W) Withdrew
18 August 1990

Malawi	0–1	Congo
		Makita 5'

Silver Stadium, Lilongwe
Referee: Christian Chikuka (Zambia)

2 September 1990

Congo	2–0	Zimbabwe
N'Domba 55'; Makita 86'

Stade Alphonse Massemba-Débat, Brazzaville
Referee: António Pereira Lopes (Angola)

14 April 1991

Zimbabwe	4–0	Malawi
McKop; Ndlovu; Chunga

National Sports Stadium, Harare
Attendance: 12,000
Referee: Jimmy Kagere (Rwanda)

28 April 1991

Congo	2–1	Malawi
Ngapy 35', 85'		Phiri 41'

Stade Alphonse Massemba-Débat, Brazzaville
Attendance: 23,000
Referee: Kabuya Kalumba (Zaire)

14 July 1991

Zimbabwe	2–2	Congo
McKop 9'; Ndlovu 78'		Makita 40'; N'Domba 89'

National Sports Stadium, Harare
Attendance: 60,000
Referee: Joseph Rakotondrainibe (Madagascar)

27 July 1991

Malawi	2–2	Zimbabwe
Rzwodzi 20' (o.g.); Chimodzi 86'		Nagoli 13'; Ndlovu 89'

Zomba Stadium, Zomba

=== Group 8 ===
Team	Pld	W	D	L	GF	GA	GD	Pts
Zaire	6	3	1	2	6	4	+2	7
Gabon	6	2	3	1	3	2	+1	7
Uganda	6	2	2	2	6	6	0	6
Tanzania	6	1	2	3	4	7	−3	4

19 August 1990

Gabon	1–0	Uganda
Manon 65'

Stade Omar Bongo, Libreville
19 August 1990

Zaire	2–0	Tanzania
Kabongo 6', 75'

Stade des Martyrs, Kinshasa
Referee: William Ochieng (Kenya)

1 September 1990

Tanzania	0–0	Gabon

Uhuru Stadium, Dar es Salaam
1 September 1990

Uganda	2–1	Zaire
Senoga 8'; Musisi 62'		Kabongo 18'

Nakivubo Stadium, Kampala
Referee: Sylvanus Anthony Oghina (Kenya)

14 April 1991

Uganda	3–2	Tanzania
Musisi 22', 26', 65'		Haule 43', 45'

Nakivubo Stadium, Kampala
Attendance: 9,000
14 April 1991

Zaire	2–1	Gabon
N'Galula 70'; Mukanya 85'		Nzamba 74'

Stade Tata Raphaël, Kinshasa
Attendance: 18,000
Referee: Laurent Pettcha (Cameroon)

27 April 1991

Tanzania	1–0	Zaire
Haule 63'

Uhuru Stadium, Dar es Salaam
Attendance: 15,000
Referee: Charles Masembe (Uganda)
27 April 1991

Uganda	0–0	Gabon

Nakivubo Stadium, Kampala
Attendance: 12,000

14 July 1991

Gabon	1–0	Tanzania
Anotho 37'

Stade Omar Bongo, Libreville
Attendance: 30,000
14 July 1991

Zaire	1–0	Uganda
Balenga 82' (pen.)

Stade des Martyrs, Kinshasa
Attendance: 70,000
Referee: ... (Cameroon)

28 July 1991

Gabon	0–0	Zaire

Stade Omar Bongo, Libreville
Attendance: 50,000
Referee: Simon Bantsimba (Congo)
29 July 1991

Tanzania	1–1	Uganda
Goal		Goal

Uhuru Stadium, Dar es Salaam

== Qualified teams ==
The 12 qualified teams are:

- Algeria (holders)
- Cameroon
- Congo
- Egypt
- Ghana
- Ivory Coast
- Kenya
- Morocco
- Nigeria
- Senegal (hosts)
- Zaire
- Zambia
