= Nigeria national football team results (1990–1999) =

- Win Draw Loss

== 1990 ==
25 January 1990 CEDEAO Cup Semi-final	Nigeria	2–0	Ivory Coast	Surulere, Lagos, Nigeria
	Okechukwu (-); Ovekammi (-)	Report		Stadium: Surulere National Stadium

28 January 1990 CEDEAO Cup Final	Nigeria	1 – 1 *	Senegal	Surulere, Lagos, Nigeria
	(Goalscorer records not available) (-)	Report	(Goalscorer records not available) (-)	Stadium: Surulere National Stadium

* Cup awarded to Nigeria as Senegal refused to take part in penalty shootout

2 March 1990 1990 Africa Cup of Nations Group A	Algeria	5–1	Nigeria	Algiers, Algeria
	Madjer 36' 58'; Menad 69' 72'; Amani 88'	Report	Okocha 82'	Stadium: Stade du 5 Juillet; Attendance: 65,000; Referee: Shizuo Takada (Japan)

5 March 1990 1990 Africa Cup of Nations Group A	Nigeria	1–0	Egypt	Algiers, Algeria
	Yekini 7'	Report		Stadium: Stade du 5 Juillet; Attendance: 45,000; Referee: Laurent Petcha (Cameroon)

8 March 1990 1990 Africa Cup of Nations Group A	Nigeria	1–0	Ivory Coast	Algiers, Algeria
	Yekini 3'	Report		Stadium: Stade du 5 Juillet; Attendance: 80,000; Referee: Abdelali Naciri (Morocco)

12 March 1990 1990 Africa Cup of Nations Semi-final	Nigeria	2–0	Zambia	Annaba, Algeria
	Okechukwu 18'; Yekini 77'	Report		Stadium: Stade du 19 Mai 1956; Attendance: 12,000; Referee: Badara Sene (Senegal)

16 March 1990 1990 Africa Cup of Nations Final	Algeria	1–0	Nigeria	Algiers, Algeria
	Oudjani 38'	Report		Stadium: Stade du 5 Juillet; Attendance: 100,000; Referee: Jean Fidele Diramba (Gabon)

18 August 1990 1992 AFCON Qualifying Group 4	Nigeria	3–0	Togo	Surulere, Lagos, Nigeria
	Okechukwu 58'; Amokachi 80'; Lawal 87'	Report		Stadium: Surulere National Stadium; Referee: Badara Sene (Senegal)

2 Sep 1990 1992 AFCON Qualifying Group 4	Ghana	1–0	Nigeria	Kumasi, Ashanti, Ghana
	Mensah 33'	Report		Stadium: Kumasi Sports Stadium; Attendance: 50,000; Referee: Celestin N'Cho (Ivory Coast)

30 September 1990 1992 AFCON Qualifying Group 4	Benin	0–1	Nigeria	Cotonou, Benin
		Report	Ishaya 55'	Referee: Kabuya Kalumba (Zaire)

== 1991 ==
13 January 1991 1992 AFCON Qualifying Group 4	Burkina Faso	1–1	Nigeria	Ouagadougou, Burkina Faso
	Ouattara (-)	Report	Ekpo (-)	Stadium: Stade du 4 Août; Attendance: 20,000; Referee: Kandute Moussa

27 January 1991 1992 AFCON Qualifying Group 4	Togo	0–0	Nigeria	Lome, Togo
		Report		Referee: Camara Fodi Capi

13 April 1991 1992 AFCON Qualifying Group 4	Nigeria	0–0	Ghana	Surulere, Lagos, Nigeria
		Report		Stadium: Surulere National Stadium; Attendance: 23,000; Referee: Yaha El Barbary

27 April 1991 1992 AFCON Qualifying Group 4	Nigeria	3–0	Benin	Surulere, Lagos, Nigeria
	Siasia 3'; Ekpo 20'; Amokachi 30'	Report		Stadium: Surulere National Stadium; Attendance: 20,000; Referee: Modibo N'Diaye (Mali)

27 July 1991 1992 AFCON Qualifying Group 4	Nigeria	7–1	Burkina Faso	Surulere, Lagos, Nigeria
	Elahor (-); Siasia (-); George (-); Yekini (-) (-) (-) (-)	Report	Toure (-)	Stadium: Surulere National Stadium; Referee: Karim Camara

31 October 1991 CEDEAO Cup Semi-final	Ivory Coast	2–0	Nigeria	Abidjan, Ivory Coast
	Sie 10'; Traore 30'	Report

2 November 1991 CEDEAO Cup 3rd place	Ghana	1–0	Nigeria	Abidjan, Ivory Coast
	Mensah 11'	Report

== 1998 ==
- Nigeria played the non-FIFA Catalonia team on 22 December 1998; this did not contribute to ranking points or individual cap totals.

== 1999 ==
- Nigeria played the non-FIFA Basque Country team on 29 December 1999; this did not contribute to ranking points or individual cap totals.
