= Ibrahima =

Ibrahima is a masculine given name of West African origin. It is a variant of the name Ibrahim. Notable people with the name include:

== Given name ==
- Ibrahima (footballer) (born 1998), French footballer
- Ibrahima Aya (born 1967), Malian writer
- Ibrahima Ba (footballer, born 1984) (born 1984), Senegalese footballer
- Ibrahima Ba (footballer, born 2005) (born 2005), Senegalese footballer
- Ibrahima Bah (born 1999), Belgian-Guinean footballer
- Ibrahima Kaba Bah (1931–2023), Guinean teacher and politician
- Ibrahima Bakayoko (born 1976), Ivorian footballer
- Ibrahima Baldé (footballer, born 1989) (born 1989), Senegalese footballer
- Ibrahima Baldé (footballer, born 2003) (born 2003), French footballer
- Ibrahima Balde (memoirist), Guinean memoirist
- Ibrahima Bamba (born 2002), Italian footballer
- Ibrahima Bangoura (born 1982), Guinean footballer
- Ibrahima Sory Bangoura (footballer, born 2004) (born 2004), Guinean footballer
- Ibrahima Sory Barry (died 1975), Guinean chief and politician
- Ibrahima Camara (footballer, born 1985) (born 1985), Sierra Leonean-Guinean footballer
- Ibrahima Camara (footballer, born 1992) (born 1992), Guinean footballer
- Ibrahima Camará (footballer, born 1999) (born 1999), Guinean footballer
- Ibrahima Cissé (footballer, born 1994) (born 1994), Belgian-Guinean footballer
- Ibrahima Cissé (footballer, born 2001) (born 2001), French-Malian footballer
- Ibrahima Aminata Condé (born 1998), Guinean footballer
- Ibrahima Conté (footballer, born 1981) (born 1981), Guinean footballer
- Ibrahima Conté (footballer, born 1991) (born 1991), Guinean footballer
- Ibrahima Conté (footballer, born 1996) (born 1996), Guinean footballer
- Ibrahima Dabo (born 1992), French-Malagasy footballer
- Ibrahima Dahirou Dembélé (born 1967), Malian Army general
- Ibrahima Diaby (born 2007), French-Guinean footballer
- Ibrahima Diallo (basketball) (born 1999), Senegalese basketball player
- Ibrahima Diallo (footballer, born 1985) (born 1985), Guinean footballer
- Ibrahima Diallo (footballer, born 1999) (born 1999), French footballer
- Ibrahima Diallo (judoka) (born 1959), Senegalese judoka
- Ibrahima Diallo (Paralympic footballer) (born 1993), British-Guinean footballer
- Ibrahima Diallo (politician) (1915–1971), Senegalese politician
- Ibrahima Kandia Diallo (1941–2018), Guinean footballer
- Ibrahima Diarra (born 1971), Burkinabe footballer
- Ibrahima Diaw (table tennis) (born 1992), Senegalese table tennis player
- Ibrahima Diédhiou (born 1994), Senegalese footballer
- Ibrahima Diomandé (born 1969), Ivorian footballer
- Ibrahima Sory Doumbouya (born 1996), Guinean footballer
- Ibrahima Dramé (born 2001), Senegalese footballer
- Ibrahima Fall (1855–1930), Senegalese Sufi religious leader
- Ibrahima Fall (athlete) (born 1955), Senegalese sprinter
- Ibrahima Fall (politician) (born 1942), Senegalese politician and professor
- Ibrahima Socé Fall (born 1966), Senegalese health executive
- Ibrahima Faye (born 1979), Senegalese footballer
- Ibrahima Fall Faye (born 1997), Senegalese basketball player
- Ibrahima Fofana (footballer, born 1946) (born 1946), Guinean footballer
- Ibrahima Fofana (trade unionist) (1952–2010), Guinean trade unionist
- Ibrahima Breze Fofana (born 2002), Guinean footballer
- Ibrahima Kalil Fofana (born 1998), Guinean basketball player
- Ibrahima Kassory Fofana (born 1954), Guinean politician
- Ibrahima Guèye (born 1941), Senegalese athlete
- Ibrahima Gueye (footballer, born 1978) (born 1978), Senegalese footballer
- Ibrahima Gueye (footballer, born 1996) (born 1996), Senegalese footballer
- Ibrahima Idrissou (born 1940), Beninese sprinter
- Ibrahima Khalil Kaba (born 1970), Guinean politician
- Ibrahima Kébé (footballer) (born 2000), Malian footballer
- Ibrahima Kébé (painter) (1955–2019), Senegalese painter
- Ibrahima Keita (footballer) (born 2001), Mali-Mauritanian footballer
- Ibrahima Konaté (born 1999), French footballer
- Ibrahima Koné (footballer, born 1969) (born 1969), Ivorian footballer
- Ibrahima Koné (footballer, born 1977) (born 1977), Malian footballer
- Ibrahima Koné (footballer, born 1999) (born 1999), Malian footballer
- Ibrahima Maïga (born 1979), Malian hurdler
- Ibrahima Mbaye (born 1994), Senegalese footballer
- Ibrahima N'Diaye (1948–2025), Malian politician
- Ibrahima N'Diaye (footballer) (born 1964), Senegalese footballer
- Ibrahima Mame N'Diaye (born 1994), Senegalese footballer
- Ibrahima Nadiya (born 1985), Senegalese-Qatari footballer
- Ibrahima Ndiaye (footballer) (born 1998), Senegalese footballer
- Ibrahima Ndour (born 1995), Senegalese footballer
- Ibrahima Niane (born 1999), Senegalese footballer
- Ibrahima Niasse (born 1988), Senegalese footballer
- Ibrahima Sané (born 1989), Senegalese footballer
- Ibrahima Sory Sankhon (born 1996), Guinean footballer
- Ibrahima Sanoh (born 1994), Guinean footballer
- Ibrahima Sarr (born 1949), Mauritanian journalist and politician
- Ibrahima Savane (born 1993), Guinean footballer
- Ibrahima Seck (born 1989), Senegalese footballer
- Ibrahima Sidibe (born 1980), Senegalese footballer
- Ibrahima Sissoko (born 1997), French-Malian footballer
- Ibrahima Sonko (born 1981), Senegalese footballer
- Ibrahima Sori (died 1784), Fula leader of the Imamate of Futa Jallon
- Ibrahima Sory Souare (born 1982), Guinean footballer
- Ibrahima Sory Soumah (born 1995), Guinean footballer
- Ibrahima Sow (born 2007), Senegalese footballer
- Ibrahima Sory Sow (1941–2026), Guinean politician
- Ibrahima Sylla (1956–2013), Senegalese-Ivorian record producer
- Ibrahima Abé Sylla (born 1951), Guinean politician
- Ibrahima Tallé (born 1968), Burkinabe footballer
- Ibrahima Tamba (born 1967), Senegalese sprinter
- Ibrahima Tandia (born 1993), French-Malian footballer
- Ibrahima Thiam (born 1981), Senegalese footballer
- Ibrahima Thomas (born 1987), Senegalese basketball player
- Ibrahima Touré (born 1985), Senegalese footballer
- Ibrahima Traoré (born 1988), French-Guinean footballer
- Ibrahima Wade (born 1968), French sprinter
- Ibrahima Wadji (born 1995), Senegalese footballer

== See also ==
- Ibrahim (name)
