= Gaston Tchangana =

Congolese football manager

Personal information
- Place of birth: Republic of the Congo

Managerial career
- Years: Team
- 2001: Congo
- 2005–2006: Congo
- 2007–2008: Congo

Gaston Tchangana is a Congolese football manager. He has been in charge of the Congo national team three times.

== Career ==
He had a brief period in charge of the Congo national team in 2001 before being replaced by Noël Minga after a FIFA World Cup qualifying defeat against Tunisia. In 2005, he succeeded Christian Létard as Congo manager, initially alongside former national team captain Célestin Mouyabi, after Létard criticised the Congolese Football Federation. Tchangana was replaced by Noël Tosi the following year, but returned for a third stint in charge in 2007 after Tosi was dismissed. Congo failed to qualify for the 2008 Africa Cup of Nations and he was replaced by Ivica Todorov.
