= Malick Fall =

Malick Fall may refer to:

- Malick Fall (footballer) (born 1968), former Senegal international footballer
- Malick Fall (swimmer) (born 1985), Olympic swimmer from Senegal
