= Okemba =

Okemba is a surname. Notable people with the surname include:

- Jean-Dominique Okemba, Congolese military and political figure
- Micheline Okemba, Congolese handball player
- Séraphine Okemba, French rugby union player
- Yvon Okemba, Congolese footballer
