= Ngoya =

Ngoya may refer to:

- Ngoya language, language of Angola
- Ngoya Forest, known as oNgoye Forest, ancient coastal scarp forest in KwaZulu-Natal, South Africa
- Ambroise Ngoya (born 1964), Congolese footballer
- Joël Ngoya (born 2002), Central African footballer
