= TWW =

TWW may refer to:

- The Legend of Zelda: The Wind Waker, an action-adventure game developed and published by Nintendo for the GameCube
- Television Wales and the West, the British Independent Television contractor serving South Wales and West of England from 1956–68
- Thomas Woodrow Wilson (1856–1924), an American politician and academic who served as the 28th president of the United States from 1913 to 1921
- Transcom WorldWide, a customer relationship management and debt collection company based in Europe
- Transformers: The War Within, a series of comic book mini-series written by Simon Furman
- Tsuen Wan West station, Hong Kong; MTR station code TWW
- The West Wing, an American serial political drama television series
