= Barthélémy Ngatsono =

Congolese football manager

Managerial career
- Years: Team
- 2016–2017: Congo
- 2025–2026: AS Vita Club
- 2025: Congo

Barthélémy Ngatsono is a Congolese football manager.

He was appointed as the Congo national football team manager in December 2016 following the sacking of Pierre Lechantre.
