= Camille Ngakosso =

Republic of the Congo football manager

Managerial career
- Years: Team
- 2011: Congo

Camille Ngakosso is a former manager of the Congo national football team.
