= Sylvain Moukassa =

Congolese footballer

Personal information
- Date of birth: 21 April 1973 (age 53)
- Place of birth: Brazzaville, Republic of the Congo

International career
Years	Team	Apps	(Gls)
1992–2014	Congo	20	(3)

Sylvain Moukassa (born 21 April 1973) is a Congolese footballer. He played in 19 matches for the Congo national football team from 1992 to 2004. He was also named in Congo's squad for the 1992 African Cup of Nations tournament.
