= Maurice Ntounou =

Congolese association footballer (born 1972)

Personal information
- Date of birth: 13 September 1972 (age 54)
- Place of birth: Brazzaville, Republic of the Congo
- Position: Defender

International career
Years	Team	Apps	(Gls)
1992–1999	Congo	12	(1)

Maurice Ntounou (born 13 September 1972) is a former Congolese international footballer. He played in 12 matches for the Congo national football team from 1992 to 1999. He was also named in Congo's squad for the 1992 African Cup of Nations tournament.
