= Isaac Ngata =

Congolese football manager (born 1965)

Isaac Ngata (born 23 September 1965) is a French-Congolese football manager and former footballer who managed the Congo national football team from 2023 to 2025.

== Career ==
He managed Congolese side DCMP, where he was described as "under his leadership the DCMP was able to break the curse of stopping at the 16th finals of the Confederation Cup".

=== Playing career ===
- july 1983 - july 1992 : AS Corbeil
- july 1992 - july 1996 : Savigny-sur-Orge
- july 1996 - july 1998 : AS Corbeil
- july 1998 - july 1999 : FC Fleury 91
- july 1999 - july 2002 : AS Corbeil

=== Manager career ===
- 01/07/98 - 01/07/99 : FC Fleury 91
- 01/07/01 - 01/07/03 : AS Corbeil
- 01/07/04 - 01/01/05 : A. Soisy-sur-seine
- 01/01/05 - 01/07/05 : ES Viry-Châtillon a. m.
- 01/07/05 - 01/07/06 : Brétigny Foot CS
- 01/07/06 - 05/05/10 : Sainte-Geneviève Sports
- 05/05/10 - 18/04/12 : ES Viry-Châtillon
- 01/07/13 - 01/07/14 : Évry FC
- 01/11/19 - 27/04/21 : DC Motema Pembe
- 02/11/23 - 10/01/25 : Congo

== Management style ==
He was described as a "fan of the 3-5-2 [formation]".

== Personal life ==
Ngata has been described as "charismatic and a lover of work".
