= Britt Assombalonga =

Congolese association footballer

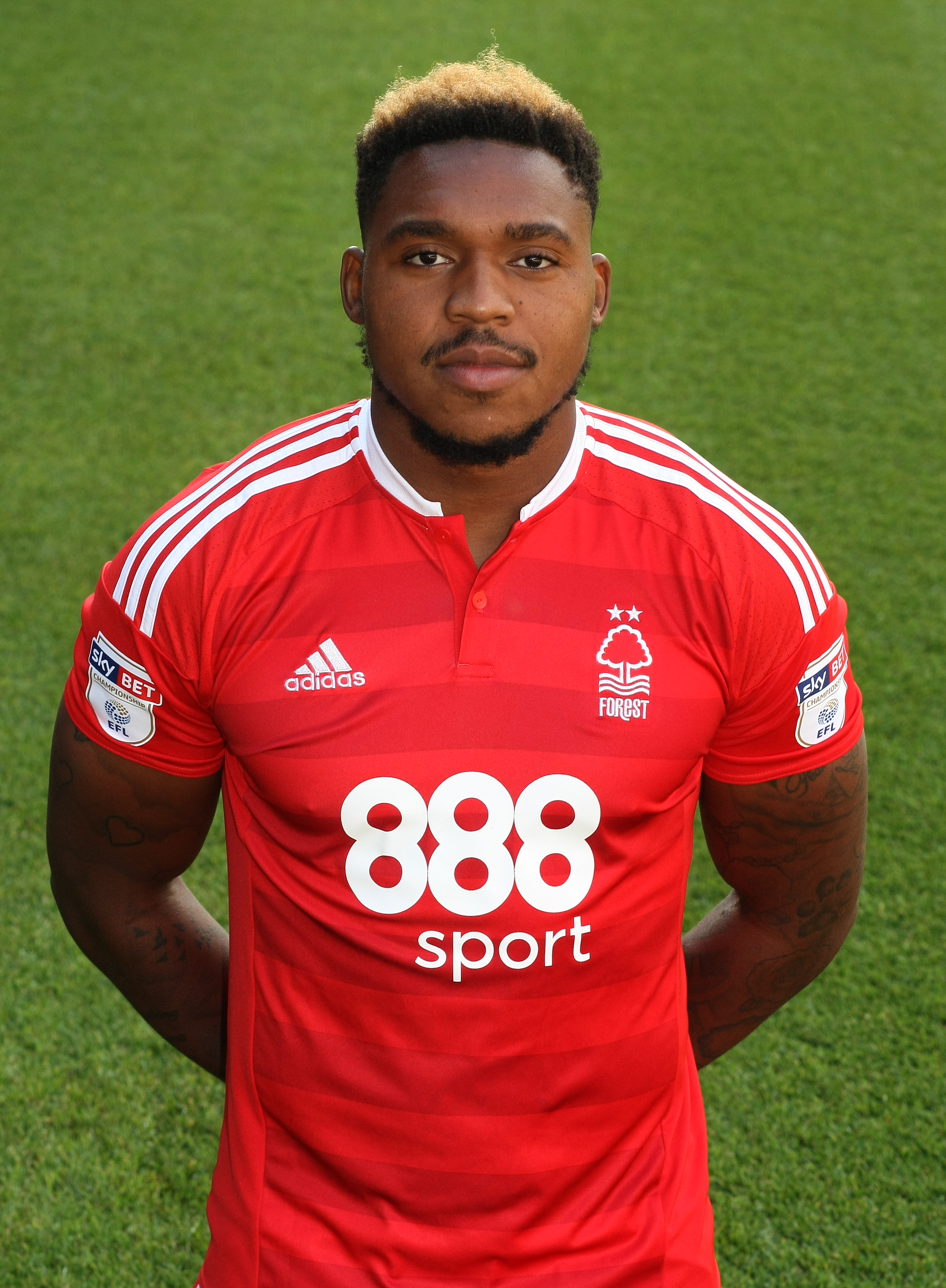
- Assombalonga with Nottingham Forest in 2016

Personal information
- Full name: Britt Curtis Assombalonga
- Date of birth: 6 December 1992 (age 33)
- Place of birth: Kinshasa, Zaire
- Height: 1.77 m (5 ft 10 in)
- Position: Forward

Team information
- Current team: Harborough Town
- Number: 27

Youth career
- 2010–2011: Watford

Senior career*
Years	Team	Apps	(Gls)
2011–2013	Watford	4	(0)
2011–2012	→ Wealdstone (loan)	11	(6)
2012	→ Braintree Town (loan)	5	(5)
2012–2013	→ Southend United (loan)	43	(15)
2013–2014	Peterborough United	43	(23)
2014–2017	Nottingham Forest	65	(30)
2017–2021	Middlesbrough	152	(45)
2021–2023	Adana Demirspor	49	(12)
2023	Watford	11	(2)
2023–2024	Antalyaspor	22	(2)
2024–2025	Amedspor	18	(3)
2025–2026	Barnet	16	(1)
2026–	Harborough Town	8	(2)

International career^{‡}
2018–2021	DR Congo	10	(1)
- * Club domestic league appearances and goals as of 25 October 2026 ‡ National team caps and goals as of 25 October 2026

Britt Curtis Assombalonga (born 6 December 1992) is a Congolese professional footballer who plays as a forward for Harborough Town. He has played in the Football League for Watford, Southend United, Peterborough United, Nottingham Forest and Middlesbrough and for the DR Congo national team.

== Early life ==
Assombalonga was born in Kinshasa, Zaire, and moved to London, England, with his family at eight months old. He grew up in Swiss Cottage, in the London borough of Camden, and attended Whitefield School. He is the son of Fedor Assombalonga, a former Zaire international footballer. His brother, Christian, is also a footballer who plays in the English non-League football system at Bourne Town Football Club

== Club career ==
=== Watford ===
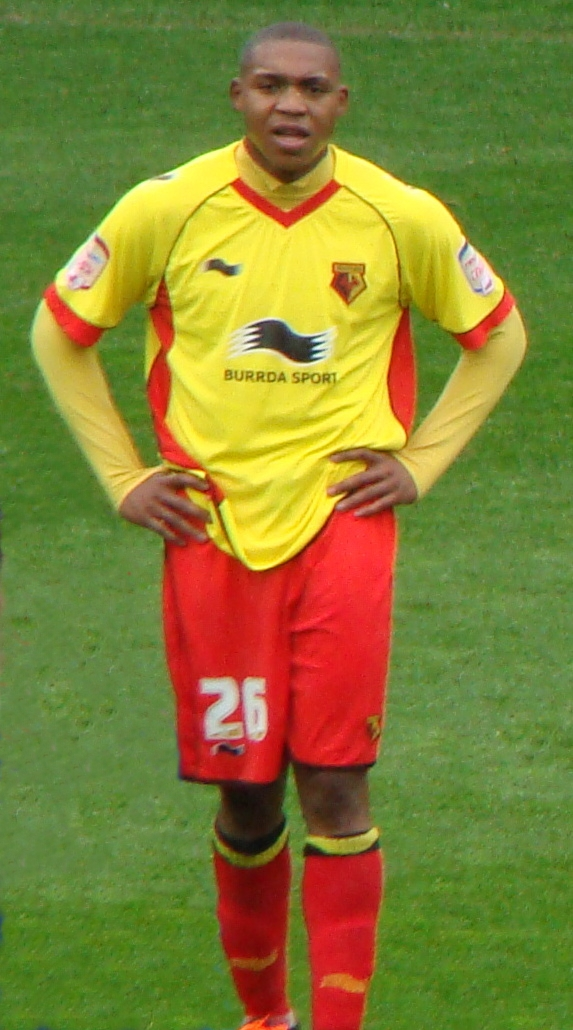
Assombalonga playing for Watford in 2012

Assombalonga began his career with Watford, signing as a 17-year-old youth player in 2010 after making his way through via the Hertswood Impact Scheme. In his first full season in the youth team, he finished as the second top goal scorer while his team made it to the FA Youth Cup quarter-finals.

He also appeared regularly for Watford's reserve team, and was rewarded for his performances with a one-year professional contract at the end of the season. He was an unused substitute for the senior squad's last two games against Preston North End and Queens Park Rangers.

In November 2011, Assombalonga joined Wealdstone alongside youth teammate Connor Smith to gain more playing experience. On 3 December, he scored his first goal in a league match against Concord Rangers. Assombalonga had his loan spell extended for another month on 4 January 2012. Assombalonga returned to Watford on 4 February, having scored 11 goals in 16 games for Wealdstone.

Just days after his return to Watford, Assombalonga was loaned to Braintree Town on a one-month deal. Despite being heavily linked with a permanent move to Scottish club Peterhead, he also signed a one-year contract extension with Watford on the same day. Assombalonga made an eventful debut in a 3–3 draw against Lincoln City; he scored his first goal for the club to put Braintree 3–2 up before being sent off for a second bookable offence. He scored four more goals in four games for Braintree after serving his one-match suspension, and was subsequently recalled by Watford to join their senior squad.

On 17 March 2012, he made his first-team debut in a 0–0 draw with Coventry City. His appearance made him the 50th player to go through Watford's academy and represent the first-team.

At the start of the 2012–13 season, Assombalonga joined League Two club Southend United on an initial one-month loan. On 25 August 2012, he scored his first goal for the club in a 3–3 draw against Northampton Town. Assombalonga went on to score five goals in four matches, including a brace in a 3–1 win against Dagenham & Redbridge on 7 September.

At the end of the month, Southend extended the loan deal to run until 3 January 2013. Having established himself in the first team, Assombalonga became the club's top scorer that season with a total of 15 goals. Southend again extended Assombalonga's loan in December 2012, keeping him at the club until the end of the season. He played in the 2013 League Trophy Final against Crewe Alexandra which Southend lost 2–0.

=== Peterborough United ===
On 31 July 2013, League One side Peterborough United broke their previous transfer record to sign Assombalonga from Watford on a four-year deal. The fee was undisclosed, but was confirmed as greatly exceeding the club's previous £1.1 million record fee. He was given the number nine shirt. Peterborough chairman Darragh MacAnthony hailed the deal, saying he was "delighted", and that Assombalonga had been Peterborough's main transfer target. On the opening game of the season, he scored on his debut as Peterborough defeated Swindon Town 1–0. He scored a penalty in a 3–1 win over Chesterfield at Wembley in the 2014 Football League Trophy Final.

=== Nottingham Forest ===
On 6 August 2014, Assombalonga joined Nottingham Forest on a five-year contract for an undisclosed fee reported to be in the region of £5 million, potentially rising to £8 million based on various clauses (of which Watford will receive 50% due to sell-on clauses). This made Assombalonga Forest's record signing, surpassing the £4.5 million fee paid to Celtic for striker Pierre van Hooijdonk in 1997. Assombalonga scored his first goals for Forest twelve days after signing, netting a brace against Bolton Wanderers at the Macron Stadium. He then scored a goal each in their next two games, against Bournemouth and Reading respectively. Assombalonga scored in his first East Midlands Derby, opening the scoring against Derby County at the City Ground. Assombalonga's goal-scoring run continued with his first hat-trick for Forest on 17 September in a 5–3 home victory against Fulham. He then went on to score in the reverse fixture against Derby, equalising at Pride Park as Forest secured a 2–1 win to relieve the pressure on their beleaguered manager Stuart Pearce. On 11 February 2015, Assombalonga sustained a serious knee injury during a 3–0 victory over Wigan Athletic after taking a shot at goal that prematurely ended his season. Assombalonga eventually made his return from injury on 19 April 2016 as an 84th-minute substitute for Robert Tesche in a draw against Blackburn Rovers. On 7 May Assombalonga scored the winner away at MK Dons, his first senior goal since his injury.

On the opening day of the 2016–17 season, Assombalonga started the first competitive match under new manager Philippe Montanier and scored a brace at home against newly promoted Burton Albion. The striker then reaffirmed his commitment to Forest by signing a new five-year contract on 2 September, tying him to the club until 2021. On 19 November, Assombalonga scored a brace against Ipswich Town, his first coming after only 17 seconds, which took his tally to six goals in eight games for the season. After the game, Assombalonga was described as the "best goalscorer in the league" by teammate Ben Osborn and "the best in the business outside of the Premier League" by former Forest defender Kenny Burns. Assombalonga missed Forest's next game – a 5–2 win at Barnsley – with a hamstring problem to continue his injury-hit start to the season. Assombalonga ended the season on a high, scoring his second brace against Ipswich Town on 7 May. With Forest remaining out of the Championship relegation zone by virtue of a one-goal difference with Blackburn Rovers, Assombalonga's brace – one a penalty and the other an exquisite solo effort – either side of a Chris Cohen goal ensured that Forest retained their Championship status at the expense of the Lancashire club. He ended the Championship season as Forest's top goalscorer, having scored 14 goals from 20 starts and 12 substitute appearances.

=== Middlesbrough ===
On 17 July 2017, Assombalonga signed for newly relegated Championship club Middlesbrough, for a reported club-record fee of £15 million. He scored his first goals for Middlesbrough when he scored twice in a 2–0 win against Burton Albion on 15 August 2017.

Middlesbrough did not offer him a renewal of his contract, due to expire at the end of the 2020–21 season, and manager Neil Warnock confirmed on 21 April 2021 that he had been allowed to leave the club early.

=== Adana Demirspor ===
On 3 July 2021, Assombalonga signed a three-year deal with the newly promoted Süper Lig side Adana Demirspor. On 29 January 2023, he had his contract terminated by mutual consent.

=== Return to Watford ===
On 29 January 2023, Assombalonga signed for Championship club Watford on a six-month contract. He scored his first goal for the club on 14 March 2023 in a 3–0 win against Birmingham City.

=== Return to Turkey ===
Assombalonga returned to Turkey to sign with Antalyaspor for the 2023-2024 season. He made 22 appearances over the course of the season before joining Diyarbakır-based club Amedspor for the 2024-2025 campaign. There, he scored three times in 18 appearances before leaving when his contract expired at the end of the season.

=== Barnet ===
Assombalonga joined EFL League Two side Barnet on 20 October 2025. he made eighteen appearances for the Bees, scoring twice. He left the club at the end of the season.

=== Harborough Town ===
On 23 July 2026 Assombalonga joined newly-promoted National League North side Harborough Town, 2025-2026 champions of the Southern League Premier Division. He signed a one-year contract, making his debut on 8 August, 2026 in their season opener against King's Lynn F.C.

== International career ==
Assombalonga was eligible to represent both England and the Democratic Republic of the Congo internationally. In August 2014, he was named on a 37-man provisional DR Congo squad list for the 2015 Africa Cup of Nations qualification but withdrew from the final squad.

On 4 November 2016, the Nottingham Post reported that Assombalonga had accepted a call-up to the DR Congo national side for their away game against Guinea on 13 November. Assombalonga was forced to pull out of the squad prior to the game as he was not cleared to play in time. That December, Assombalonga rejected the chance to represent DR Congo at the 2017 Africa Cup of Nations in Gabon, stating that he wanted to focus on playing games for Nottingham Forest after an injury-hit season.

Assombalonga made his senior debut for DR Congo in a friendly 2–0 loss to Tanzania on 27 March 2018.

== Coaching ==
On 14 September, 2026, Assombalonga's former club, Peterborough United, confirmed that he was shadowing their academy coaches with a view to moving into full-time coaching once his playing days were over.

== Career statistics ==
=== Club ===
As of end of 2025–26 season

Appearances and goals by club, season and competition
Club	Season	League			National cup (Note: Includes FA Cup, Turkish Cup)		League cup (Note: Includes EFL Cup)		Other		Total	
Club	Season	Division	Apps	Goals	Apps	Goals	Apps	Goals	Apps	Goals	Apps	Goals
Watford	2011–12	Championship	4	0	0	0	0	0	—		4	0
Watford	2012–13	Championship	0	0	—		—		0	0	0	0
Watford	Total		4	0	0	0	0	0	0	0	4	0
Wealdstone (loan)	2011–12	IL Premier Division	11	6	—		—		5 (Note: Four appearances and three goals in FA Trophy, one appearance and two goals in Middlesex Senior Cup)	5	16	11
Braintree Town (loan)	2011–12	Conference Premier	5	5	—		—		—		5	5
Southend United (loan)	2012–13	League Two	43	15	0	0	0	0	6 (Note: Appearances in Football League Trophy)	1	49	16
Peterborough United	2013–14	League One	43	23	4	5	3	1	8 (Note: Two appearances and one goal in League One play-offs, six appearances and three goals in Football League Trophy)	4	58	33
Nottingham Forest	2014–15	Championship	29	15	1	0	2	0	—		32	15
Nottingham Forest	2015–16	Championship	4	1	0	0	0	0	—		4	1
Nottingham Forest	2016–17	Championship	32	14	1	0	0	0	—		33	14
Nottingham Forest	Total		65	30	2	0	2	0	—		69	30
Middlesbrough	2017–18	Championship	44	15	1	0	0	0	2	0	47	15
Middlesbrough	2018–19	Championship	42	14	3	2	1	0	0	0	46	16
Middlesbrough	2019–20	Championship	35	11	0	0	1	0	0	0	36	11
Middlesbrough	2020–21	Championship	31	5	0	0	1	0	0	0	32	5
Middlesbrough	Total		152	45	4	2	3	0	2	0	161	47
Adana Demirspor	2021–22	Süper Lig	37	10	3	2	–		–		40	12
Adana Demirspor	2022–23	Süper Lig	11	2	2	4	–		–		13	6
Adana Demirspor	Total		48	12	5	6	–		–		53	18
Watford	2022–23	Championship	11	2	–		–		–		11	2
Antalyaspor	2023–24	Süper Lig	22	2	4	4	–		–		26	6
Amedspor	2024–25	TFF 1. Lig	18	3	0	0	–		–		18	3
Barnet	2025–26	League Two	16	1	1	0	0	0	1	1	18	2
Career total			436	144	20	15	8	1	22	11	486	173

=== International ===
Scores and results list DR Congo's goal tally first, score column indicates score after each Assombalonga goal.

International goal scored by Britt Assombalonga
No.	Date	Venue	Opponent	Score	Result	Competition
1.	30 June 2019	30 June Stadium, Cairo, Egypt	Zimbabwe	4–0	4–0	2019 Africa Cup of Nations

== Honours ==
Southend United

- Football League Trophy runner-up: 2012–13

Peterborough United

- Football League Trophy: 2013–14

Individual

- PFA Team of the Year: 2013–14 League One
