= Aristide Amouzoud =

Congolese footballer

Personal information
- Date of birth: 22 April 1969 (age 57)
- Position: Forward

International career
Years	Team	Apps	(Gls)
1992	Congo	3	(0)

Aristide Amouzoud (born 22 April 1969) is a Congolese footballer. He played in three matches for the Congo national football team at the 1992 African Cup of Nations.
