= Ambroise Ngoya =

Congolese footballer

Personal information
- Date of birth: 2 March 1964 (age 62)

International career
Years	Team	Apps	(Gls)
1993	Congo	1	(0)

Ambroise Ngoya (born 2 March 1964) is a Congolese footballer. He played in one match for the Congo national football team in 1993. He was also named in Congo's squad for the 1992 African Cup of Nations tournament.
