= Epangala Lukose =

Congolese footballer

Personal information
- Full name: Pathy Lokose Epangala
- Date of birth: 20 April 1964 (age 62)
- Position: Defender

Senior career*
Years	Team	Apps	(Gls)
- Air Zaïre
c. 1991 – c. 1999	AS Vita Club		

International career
c. 1992 – c. 1999	DR Congo		

Managerial career
- 2000 - 2001: AS Vita Club
- 2002: AS Vita Club
- 2020: DC Motema Pembe (Assistant Manager)
- * Club domestic league appearances and goals

Epangala Lukose (born 20 April 1964) is a retired Congolese football defender. He was a squad member at the 1992, 1994 and 1996 Africa Cup of Nations.
