= Fedor Assombalonga =

Congolese association footballer

Fedora Assombalonga
Personal information
- Full name: Fedora Ngondola Assombalonga
- Date of birth: 4 June 1969 (age 57)
- Place of birth: DR Congo
- Position: Striker

Youth career
- 1982-1983: FC GwaGwa
- 1983-1986: FC Mpakasa

Senior career*
Years	Team	Apps	(Gls)
1986-1992	AS Bilima		
1992-1993	FC Maia		

International career
1992	Zaire	2	(0)
- * Club domestic league appearances and goals

Fedora 'Fedor' Ngondola Assombalanga (born 4 June 1969) is a Congolese former footballer who played as a striker for AS Dragons/Bilima. He was a lethal striker scoring nearly every match, and finished topscorer nearly every season in the Congolese National League. He scored over 30 goals each season.

== Personal life ==
Assombalanga retired in 1992, and moved to live in London, England. He is married to Béatrice Assombalonga.

He has two son, Christian and Britt.

Britt is also a professional footballer who plays for the DR Congo national team.

== International career ==
Assombalonga played for Zaire in the 1992 African Nations Cup.
