= Iyambo Etshele =

Congolese footballer (born 1968)

Personal information
- Full name: Iyambo Mara Etshele
- Date of birth: 28 September 1968 (age 58)
- Place of birth: Kinshasa, Zaire
- Height: 1.69 m (5 ft 7 in)
- Position: Midfielder

Senior career*
Years	Team	Apps	(Gls)
- AS Kalamu
1988–1993	Gazélec Ajaccio	127	(6)
1993–1994	Valenciennes-Anzin	26	(0)
1994–1995	Lille	11	(0)
1995–1996	Le Havre	8	(0)
1996–1998	US Saint-Denis	60	(1)
1999–2000	CM Aubervilliers		

International career
	Zaire	15+	
- * Club domestic league appearances and goals

Iyambo Mara Etshele (born 28 September 1968) is a Congolese former professional footballer who played as a midfielder. He was a squad member of the Zaire national team at the 1992 Africa Cup of Nations. He was naturalized French in the early 1990s.

== Career ==
On 13 March 1990, while at French Division 3 club Gazélec Ajaccio, Etshele scored in his club's 3–1 loss against Marseille in the round of 16 of the 1989–90 Coupe de France. At the end of the season, Gazélec Ajaccio achieved promotion to French Division 2.

Etshele obtained French nationality during the 1991–92 season.

== Honours ==
Gazélec Ajaccio

- Promotion to French Division 2: 1989–90
