= Gerry Saurer =

Austrian football manager

Personal information
- Date of death: July 1992

Managerial career
- Years: Team
- 1984-1985: AFC Leopards
- Volcano United
- 1990-1992: Kenya

Gerry Saurer (died July 1992) was an Austrian football manager who is last known to have managed Kenya.

== Career ==
In 1984, Saurer was appointed manager of Kenyan side AFC Leopards after managing teams in Switzerland and the Seychelles. In 1990, he was appointed manager of Kenya.
