= Christian Samba =

Congolese footballer

Personal information
- Full name: Christian Brice Samba
- Date of birth: 26 March 1971 (age 55)
- Place of birth: Brazzaville, People's Republic of the Congo
- Height: 1.80 m (5 ft 11 in)
- Position: Goalkeeper

Senior career*
Years	Team	Apps	(Gls)
1989–1999	Diables Noirs		
1999–2000	Africa Sports		
2000–2004	Pacy Vallée-d'Eure		

International career
1992–2000	Congo		
- * Club domestic league appearances and goals

Christian Brice Samba (born 26 March 1971) is a Congolese former professional footballer who played as a goalkeeper.

== International career ==
Samba was a member of the Congo national team from 1991 to 2000.
