= Mbala Henri Balenga =

Congolese footballer

Personal information
- Full name: Mbala Henri Balenga Mukuka
- Date of birth: 17 December 1966 (age 59)
- Position: Forward

Senior career*
Years	Team	Apps	(Gls)
1985–1987	Royal Antwerp F.C.		
1987–1989	K. Boom F.C.		
1989–1993	K.A.A. Gent		
1993–1994	K.S.V. Waregem		
1994–1998	K.A.A. Gent		
1998–1999	R.E. Virton		
1999–2000	F91 Dudelange		

International career
- DR Congo
- * Club domestic league appearances and goals

Mbala Henri Balenga (born 17 December 1966) is a retired Congolese football striker. He was a squad member at the 1992 Africa Cup of Nations.
