= Célestin Mouyabi =

Congolese footballer

Personal information
- Date of birth: 30 July 1957 (age 69)

International career
| Years | Team | Apps | (Gls) |
| 1992–1993 | Congo | 6 | (0) |

Célestin Mouyabi (born 30 July 1957) is a Congolese footballer. He played in six matches for the Congo national football team in 1992 and 1993. He was named in Congo's squad for the 1992 African Cup of Nations tournament. Mouyabi also captained the national side and later became the team's coach.
