= Yvon Okemba =

Congolese footballer

Personal information
- Date of birth: 5 February 1966 (age 60)

International career
Years	Team	Apps	(Gls)
1992–1996	Congo	4	(0)

Yvon Okemba (born 5 February 1966) is a Congolese footballer. He played in four matches for the Congo national football team from 1992 to 1996. He was also named in Congo's squad for the 1992 African Cup of Nations tournament.
