= Allan Odhiambo =

Kenyan footballer (born 1971)

Personal information
- Date of birth: 16 September 1971 (age 55)

International career
Years	Team	Apps	(Gls)
1992–1996	Kenya	11	(3)

Allan Odhiambo (born 16 September 1971) is a Kenyan footballer. He played in eleven matches for the Kenya national football team from 1992 to 1996. He was also named in Kenya's squad for the 1992 African Cup of Nations tournament.
