= Ibrahima Socé Fall =

Senegalese global health executive

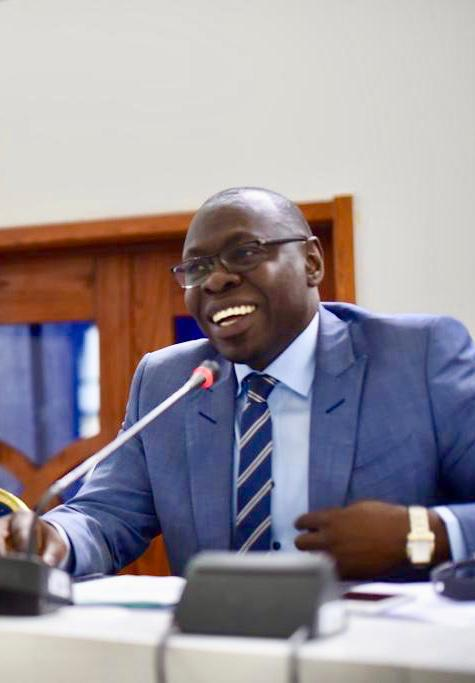
- Ibrahima Soce Fall 2019 Ebola Conference
- Born: Ibrahima Socé Fall; 1966 (age 59–60); Dakar, Senegal
- Education: Cheikh Anta Diop University; Tulane University
- Occupations: Chief Executive Officer, Pasteur Institute of Dakar
- Years active: 1990–present

Ibrahima Socé Fall (born 1966) is a Senegalese executive in the area of global health. He was Assistant Director-General for Emergencies Response at the World Health Organization (WHO) and United Nations Assistant – Secretary-General. Fall has worked on various outbreak response and research teams in the field to eradicate the spread of diseases including COVID-19, Ebola, malaria, AIDS, and tuberculosis. He was previously the Regional Emergencies Director of the WHO in the African Region and worked on Health Security and emergency preparedness and specially on emerging and re-emerging infectious diseases, epidemics and humanitarian crises.

== Education ==
Fall holds a doctorate in medicine, a master's degree in public health, and a doctorate in public health from Cheikh Anta Diop University in Dakar, Senegal. He also holds a master's degree in sustainable development from Tulane University, a degree in tropical medicine and epidemiology from Aix-Marseille University and the École du Pharo. Fall is also a fellow of the Faculty of Public Health of the Royal College of Physicians of the UK.

== Career ==
Fall occupied positions in Senegal including head of epidemics and communicable diseases control, immunization on the provincial level, Member of the National Malaria Control Program guidance committee, and as a Lecturer in Public Health on the Dakar University, Head of Planning and Control Division within the Army Health Department and as a Military frontline Doctor.

Fall was the Regional Emergencies Director for WHO in the African Region. Fall joined WHO in November 2003 as Coordinator of the Africa Region malaria inter-country support team and the then Regional Adviser for malaria strategic planning.

From February 2007 to October 2012, Fall was the Regional Advisor to WHO Regional Office for Africa, headed the strategic planning team for the malaria programme. In 2007, he was nominated as the WHO focal point for Malaria Strategic planning at global level as well as Co-chair of the Working Group on Strategic Planning for the global Roll Back Malaria Partnership.

Fall was the Director of Health Security and Emergencies Cluster at the WHO Regional Office in 2015. Formally WHO Representative in Mali, he was appointed Ebola Crisis Manager and Head of UN Mission for Ebola Emergency Response (UNMEER) mission in Mali in November 2014. He became Director, Health Security and Emergencies Cluster, WHO Regional Office in Congo.

Fall was involved in managing the Ebola crisis in Democratic Republic of Congo and also strengthening the Ebola response team in the country.

Fall was awarded “African Heroes Awards 2017 by The Department of African Studies and the African Student Association, Ohio University, USA for his contribution to the fight against Ebola in Africa.

He was appointed Director, Neglected Tropical Diseases, at the World Health Organization in 2022. In 2025 he left the WHO and was named Chief Executive Officer of the Pasteur Institute of Dakar.
