= Youssef Haraoui =

Algerian footballer (born 1965)

Personal information
- Full name: Benyoucef Haraoui
- Date of birth: 12 May 1965 (age 61)
- Place of birth: Algiers, Algeria
- Height: 1.76 m (5 ft 9 in)
- Position: Midfielder

Senior career*
Years	Team	Apps	(Gls)
1984–1986	Paris FC		
1986–1991	Paris Saint-Germain		
1987–1988	→ Le Puy (loan)	13	(0)
1989–1990	→ Abbeville (loan)	15	(0)
1991–1993	Slovan Bratislava	20	(3)
1993	Chaves	7	(0)
1993–1994	Karabükspor	20	(7)
1994–1995	Bursaspor	26	(8)
1995–1996	Karşıyaka	26	(2)

International career
1990	Algeria	6	(2)
- * Club domestic league appearances and goals

Youssef Haraoui (Arabic: يوسف حراوي; born on 12 May 1965 Algiers) is a retired Algerian professional football midfielder. He played for clubs in Europe, including SC Abbeville, ŠK Slovan Bratislava, G.D. Chaves, Karabükspor, Bursaspor and Karşıyaka S.K. as well as the Algeria national football team.

== Honours ==
=== Club ===
ŠK Slovan Bratislava

- Czechoslovak First League: 1991–92
