= Ibrahima Balde (memoirist) =

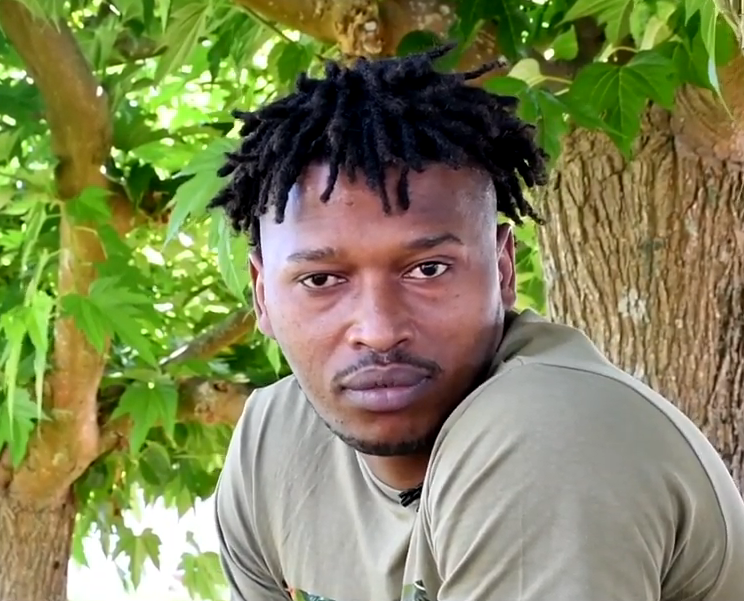
Balde in 2020

Ibrahima Balde is a Guinean memoirist who detailed his journey to find his brother in a 2019 memoir, Little Brother, written with Amets Arzallus Antia. His memoir was adapted into a play by Timberlake Wertenbaker and was staged at the Jermyn Street Theatre in London in 2025.

Little Brother was published by Scribe Publications in 2019. Little Brother was one of the recipients of the PEN Translates award for the translation from the Basque language by Timberlake Wertenbaker.

Little Brother was adapted into a play by Timberlake Wertenbaker and is due to be staged at the Jermyn Street Theatre in London between 15 May and the 21 June 2025 under the direction of Stella Powell-Jones. In May 2025 Balde was denied a visa to visit the United Kingdom by the Home Office who stated that they were "not satisfied that you have demonstrated your circumstances are as declared or are as such that you intend to leave the UK at the end of your visit". The decision was reversed three days later. Balde is due to stay with Wertenbaker during his time in the UK. David Doyle, the executive producer of the Jermyn Street Theatre said that "If the UK is to remain a global leader for arts and culture, as a nation, we must take more care not to place unnecessary restrictions on artists travelling here".
