= Christian Letard =

French football manager and player (born 1947)

Personal information
- Date of birth: 23 November 1947 (age 78)
- Place of birth: Le Poiré-sur-Vie, France
- Position: Midfielder

Senior career*
Years	Team	Apps	(Gls)
1966-1972	Roche-sur-Yon		
1972-1976	FC Yonnais		

Managerial career
- 1981-1989: Roche-sur-Yon
- 1989-1994: Le Mans
- 1994-1995: Grenoble
- 1995-1999: Tours
- 1999-2001: Angoulême
- 2002: Vietnam U23
- 2004-2005: Congo
- * Club domestic league appearances and goals

Christian Letard (born 23 November 1947) is a French retired football manager who most recently managed the Congo national team. In addition to Congo, he has also managed France and Vietnam.

== Career ==
In 1981, Letard was appointed manager of French third division side Roche-sur-Yon, helping them earn promotion to the French second division. In 1989, he became the manager of Le Mans in the French second division, where he suffered relegation to the French third division. In 1994, Letard was appointed manager of the French fourth division club Grenoble.

In 2002, he was appointed manager of Vietnam U23, where he successfully sued the Vietnam Football Federation for unfair dismissal.

In 2004, Letard took on the role of manager of Congo, where he stated, "I am not Zorro. Nor those marabouts of illusions who manage, alas, to convince their credulous employers in Africa that four months of intensive preparation is enough to compete with the best teams on the continent".
