= Henry McKop =

Zimbabwean footballer (born 1967)

Personal information
- Full name: Henry McKop
- Date of birth: 8 July 1967 (age 59)
- Place of birth: Harare, Rhodesia (now Zimbabwe)
- Position: Defender

Senior career*
Years	Team	Apps	(Gls)
1988–1992	Zimbabwe Saints F.C.		
1992–1993	Bonner SC		
1993–1995	Bristol City	5	(0)
1995–1996	Shelbourne	19	(0)
1996–1997	SK Vorwärts Steyr	28	(0)
1997–1999	Mamelodi Sundowns F.C.	42	(0)
1999–2000	Spartak Pretoria		
2000–2001	Wits University F.C.	15	(0)
2000–2001	AmaZulu F.C.	19	(2)

International career
1988–1998	Zimbabwe		
- * Club domestic league appearances and goals

Henry McKop (born 8 July 1967) is a retired football defender.

During his club career, Mckop played for Zimbabwe Saints, Bonner SC, Bristol City, Shelbourne, Vorwärts Steyr, Mamelodi Sundowns, Spartak Pretoria, Wits University and AmaZulu. He also played for the Zimbabwe national football team

== Club career ==
In 1995, McKop signed for Irish side Shelbourne. He helped the club win the 1995–96 League of Ireland Cup.

== International career ==
McKop is a Zimbabwe international. He played under German manager Reinhard Fabisch while playing for the Zimbabwe national football team.

== Personal life ==
McKop was born on 8 July 1967 in Harare, Zimbabwe. He has been nicknamed "Bully".
