= Ivica Todorov =

Serbian footballer

Personal information
- Date of birth: 4 July 1950 (age 76)
- Place of birth: Zrenjanin, SFR Yugoslavia
- Position: Midfielder

Senior career*
Years	Team	Apps	(Gls)
1967–1969	Proleter Zrenjanin		
1969–1972	Novi Sad		
1972	Red Star Belgrade		
1973–1975	DJK Konstanz		
1975–1976	Limoges		
1976–1977	Mouscron		
1977–1979	US Pont-l'Abbé		
1979–1983	Stade Français		

Managerial career
- 1977–1979: US Pont-l'Abbé
- 1979–1984: Stade Français (Youth coach)
- 1984–1985: Stade Français
- 1985–1986: Limoges
- 1986–1989: JAC Port-Gentil
- 1989–1990: Dijon
- Lyon-La Duchère
- 1993–1994: Brest
- 1995–1996: SAS Rabat
- 1996–1997: Maghreb Fez
- 1997–1998: Kawkab Marrakech
- 1998–2000: FUS Rabat
- 2000: Al-Ahli Dubai
- 2000–2001: Al-Shabab Riyadh
- 2002: ES Sahel
- 2003: WAC Casablanca
- 2004–2005: Burkina Faso
- 2006–2007: FC 105 Libreville
- 2007–2008: Najran
- 2008–2010: Congo
- 2010–2011: Arab Contractors
- * Club domestic league appearances and goals

Ivica Todorov, known in France as Yves Todorov (born 4 July 1950) is a Serbian-French football coach who manages Arab Contractors.

He previously coached the Congo national side, a job which he took up in April 2008. He has previously managed some French teams, the Burkino Faso national side, as well as club sides including FUS Rabat of Morocco and Étoile du Sahel of Tunisia and FC 105 Libreville of Gabon.
