= Ibrahima Thiam =

Senegalese footballer (born 1981)

Personal information
- Full name: Ibrahima Thiam-Iyane
- Date of birth: 20 August 1981 (age 45)
- Place of birth: Guédiawaye, Senegal
- Height: 6 ft 6 in (1.98 m)
- Position: Striker

Youth career
- Paris Saint-Germain
- RC Lens

Senior career*
Years	Team	Apps	(Gls)
2001-2002	Dakar UC	0	(0)
2001-2002	Kickers Emden	0	(0)
2002-2004	PFC Dobrudzha	5	(1)
2004	Strømsgodset Toppfotball	7	(1)
2004-2006	KFC Verbroedering Geel	30	(4)
2006-2007	AFC Tubize	13	(1)
2006	Union Namur	0	(0)
2007-2008	CS Visé	0	(0)
2008-2009	Drogheda United F.C.	19	(2)
2009–2010	KV Turnhout	11	(2)
2010	Sydney FC (Trial)	2	(1)
2010-2011	KSV Roeselare	1	(0)
2012-2013	Budapest Honvéd FC	0	(0)
2012-2013	Budapest Honvéd FC II	1	(0)
2014-2015	KV Turnhout	0	(0)
2015-2016	ASV Geel	0	(0)

International career
2010	Senegal U-23	3	(0)
- * Club domestic league appearances and goals

Ibrahima Thiam-Iyane (born 20 August 1981) is a Senegalese retired footballer.

== Career ==
=== PFC Dobrudzha ===
Thiam played for Bulgarian top flight First Professional Football League club PFC Dobrudzha from 2002 after impressing in a pre-season trial. Thiam finished the 2002–2003 season with one goal which he scored against Botev Plovdiv 3–0. Unfortunately PFC Dobrudzha would be relegated to the Bulgarian Second Professional Football League after finishing 13th.

Despite interest from other Bulgarian First Professional Football League teams, Thiam would disappear from Bulgaria without notifying PFC Dobrudzha officials.

=== Strømsgodset Toppfotball ===
Norwegian First Division club Strømsgodset Toppfotball invited Thiam to their training camp before the 2004 season. Thiam made a positive impression at the camp and was rewarded a deal with a contract with Drammen's Godset. Thiam would end the season having played 7 games and scoring 1 goal. His goal came against Tromsdalen contributing to a 4–2 victory. Thiam would be released by Strømsgodset Toppfotball during November 2004.

=== Stints in Belgium ===
Thiam secured a transfer to newly promoted Belgian second division club KFC Verbroedering Geel for the 2004–2005 season. He would have a productive season for the Geel club, playing 30 games and scoring 4 goals as KFC Verbroedering Geel chased a promotion into the Belgian Pro League.

Despite finishing 3rd and qualifying for the promotion playoff series, Thiam's club KFC Verbroedering Geel would be at the centre of the notorious 2005 Geel-Waasland affair controversy. Geel were accused of offering KFC Red Star Waasland players bribes via intermediaries to ensure victory in their final round match. KFC Verbroedering Geel would subsequently be penalised with relegation to Division 3 by the Royal Belgian Football Association.

Thiam moved to fellow Belgian division club AFC Tubize for the first half of the 2006–2007 season where he would score 1 goal in a 13 match tenure.

In early 2007 briefly joined Belgian Division 3 club Union Namur before returning to the Belgian second division with CS Visé where he was contracted until 2008.

=== Drogheda United FC ===
Upon participating as a trialist in a training camp across February 2008 and impressing in a friendly against Wisła Kraków, Thiam was rewarded with a permanent contract with League of Ireland Premier Division team Drogheda United FC.

Thiam made his League of Ireland Premier Division debut for Drogheda United FC on 8 March 2008 in a 0–1 home loss to Shamrock Rovers FC.

On 18 March 2008, Thiam made his cup debut for The Drogs in a Setanta Sports Cup fixture against Cork City FC.

Thiam scored his first goal for Drogheda United FC on 31 May 2008 in a 4–0 rout of Cobh Ramblers FC. Thiam's second and final goal for Drogheda United FC would come in a 1–1 draw with Shamrock Rovers.

In June 2008, Thiam would be involved in a racism incident where a Drogheda supporter hurled derogatory slurs at the Senegalese striker during a home game against Sligo Rovers FC. In a statement after the incident it would be revealed that the assailant was handed a lifetime ban by Drogheda United FC officials in defence of Thiam as well as the "club's strict commitment to a family-friendly environment and anti-racism codes". Thiam himself was unaware of the incident while playing on the pitch.

=== KV Turnhout ===
On 11 October 2009, Thiam was announced as a new signing for KV Turnhout where he was tipped to be a "new sensation" by Het Nieuwsblad. He would have a modest tenure for the Turnhoutenars making 11 appearances and scoring twice.

=== Sydney FC ===
Thiam was subject to interest from A-League Men giants Sydney FC during the 2010-11 pre-season. Thiam would play 2 games for Sydney FC in the 2010 Sydney Festival of Football. Making his debut for Sydney FC in opening game against Super League Greece heavyweights AEK Athens FC, Thiam was substituted on at the 69th minute. Thiam would score his debut goal shortly after being introduced, an 88th minute consolation to bring the scoreline to 5–3.

Thiam would play the next game in the 2010 Sydney Festival of Football against Scottish Premier League powerhouse Rangers FC where he would be a second-half substitute for Mark Bridge. He would unfortunately not score in this game. This would be the conclusion of his trial period with Sydney FC.

Thiam is remembered fondly as somewhat of a cult hero amongst Sydney FC's supporter group The Cove where he carries the nickname Ian Tallguy.

=== KSV Roeselare ===
Thiam was unveiled in February 2011 as a signing to bolster Belgian second division club KSV Roeselare after training with their reserve team.

=== Honvéd ===
Thiam would spend 2012 and 2013 with the historic Hungarian top flight team Honvéd. Despite training regularly with Honvéd's reserves, Thiam would make only a solitary appearance for the club's second team and fail to feature at all for the first team.

=== Final Years in Belgium and Retirement ===
Thiam returned to Belgium in 2014 signing with Belgian Division 3 club KFC Turnhout. In the following year, Thiam would sign with Allemaal Samen Verbroedering Geel - the successor club to his former team KFC Verbroedering Geel.

Thiam would announce his retirement from professional football on 1 July 2016.

== Style of Play ==
During his playing career, Thiam considered himself to be a target man. Paul Doolin, Thiam's manager during his stint at Drogheda United FC as a "giant" while also being "very mobile too".

== Life After Football ==
Thiam graduated from the Real Madrid Graduate School with an MBA in Sports Management which he would put into practice by founding Matam footballing academy and club Noyau Sportif Football Club in his home nation of Senegal in 2015.

Thiam's Noyau Sportif Football Club (NSFC-Iyane) focuses on developing young local talent while protecting prospective footballers from illegal immigration through programs combining athletic training with academic education. The club operates a fully equipped academy while working with trusted scouting networks to safely facilitate trials and transfers with professional teams across Europe, Asia, and Africa. On 14 October 2025 Thiam signed off on a partnership with the Université Internationale de Casablanca in Morocco for NSFC-Iyane high school graduate players to access higher education in order to improve both their sporting and professional prospects.

Thiam is an ambassador for the non-profit sports and philanthropic organization, The Cinco Colores Foundation.

In October 2016, Thiam became the first Senegalese to own a European football club after it was announced that he had become the majority shareholder of Polish top flight Ekstraklasa club Korona Kielce.
