= François Makita =

Congolese footballer

Personal information
- Full name: François Makita
- Date of birth: 6 May 1963 (age 63)
- Place of birth: Brazzaville, Republic of the Congo
- Position: Forward

Senior career*
Years	Team	Apps	(Gls)
1984–1985	Montelimar		
1985–1986	Saint-Étienne	14	(3)
1986–1987	Nîmes		
1987–1989	Louhans-Cuiseaux		
1989–1991	Ancenis		
1992	Épernay		

International career
1984–1993	Republic of the Congo		
- * Club domestic league appearances and goals

François Makita (born 6 May 1963) is a Congolese former professional footballer who played as a forward. He represented the Republic of the Congo national team internationally from 1984 to 1993.

== Career ==
Raised in Pointe-Noire, Makita began playing youth football for Congolese sides, debuting in 1977 with Brazzaville's CS Negro and later playing for CARA Brazzaville. In 1984, he moved to France to play for Montelimar. He would play in Ligue 2 for AS Saint-Étienne before finishing his career with several lower-tier French clubs.

Makita made several appearances for the Congo national team, including one FIFA World Cup qualifying match, and he participated at the 1992 African Cup of Nations finals. Makita helped Congo reach the quarter-finals of the 1992 Cup of Nations.

After retiring from playing, Makita became a football manager. He was briefly the manager of US Argenton.
