= Anthony Lwanga =

Kenyan footballer (born 1972)

Personal information
- Date of birth: 20 March 1972 (age 54)

International career
Years	Team	Apps	(Gls)
1992–1996	Kenya	12	(1)

Anthony Lwanga (born 20 March 1972) is a Kenyan footballer. He played in twelve matches for the Kenya national football team from 1992 to 1996. He was also named in Kenya's squad for the 1992 African Cup of Nations tournament.
