= Whiteson Changwe =

Zambian footballer (1964–1993)

Personal information
- Full name: Whiteson Changwe
- Date of birth: 19 October 1964
- Place of birth: Northern Rhodesia, now Zambia
- Date of death: 27 April 1993 (aged 28)
- Place of death: Atlantic Ocean, off Gabon
- Position: Defender

Senior career*
Years	Team	Apps	(Gls)
1992–1993	Kabwe Warriors		

International career
1988–1993	Zambia	32	(1)
- * Club domestic league appearances and goals

Whiteson Changwe (19 October 1964 – 27 April 1993) was a Zambian footballer and member of the national team. He was among those killed in the crash of the team plane in Gabon in 1993.

== Career statistics ==
=== International ===
As of match played 25 April 1993.

Appearances and goals by national team and year
National team	Year	Apps	Goals
Zambia	1988	3	0
Zambia	1989	7	0
Zambia	1990	6	1
Zambia	1991	4	0
Zambia	1992	7	0
Zambia	1993	5	0
Total		32	1

Scores and results list Zambia's goal tally first, score column indicates score after each Changwe goal.

List of international goals scored by Whiteson Changwe
No.	Date	Venue	Cap	Opponent	Score	Result	Competition	Ref.
1.	19 August 1990	Independence Stadium, Lusaka, Zambia	14	Eswatini	5–0	5–0	1992 Africa Cup of Nations qualification	
