= Malick Fall (footballer) =

Senegalese footballer (1968–2023)

Personal information
- Date of birth: 17 November 1968
- Place of birth: Matam, Senegal
- Date of death: 16 October 2023 (aged 54)
- Height: 1.80 m (5 ft 11 in)
- Position: Forward

Senior career*
Years	Team	Apps	(Gls)
1986–1987	Amiens	3	(0)
1987–1990	Abbeville	79	(18)
1990–1992	Angers	39	(5)
1992–1993	Amiens	8	(0)
1994–1996	Brest	2	(0)
Total		131	(29)

International career
1992	Senegal	3	(0)
- * Club domestic league appearances and goals

Malick Fall (17 November 1968 – 16 October 2023) was a Senegalese professional footballer who played as a forward, spending most of his career in France. At international level, he made three appearances for the Senegal national team.

== Career ==
Born in Matam, Fall moved to France as a youth and played for several clubs in Ligue 2, including Amiens SC, SC Abbeville and Angers SCO.

Fall made several appearances for the Senegal national team, and played at the 1992 African Cup of Nations finals.

== Death ==
Malick Fall died on 16 October 2023, at the age of 54.
