= Uche Okechukwu =

Nigerian footballer (born 1967)

Personal information
- Full name: Uchechukwu Alozie Okechukwu
- Date of birth: 27 September 1967 (age 59)
- Place of birth: Lagos, Nigeria
- Height: 1.89 m (6 ft 2 in)
- Position: Centre back

Senior career*
Years	Team	Apps	(Gls)
1987	Flash Flamingoes		
1988–1990	Iwuanyanwu Nationale		
1990–1993	Brøndby	61	(10)
1993–2002	Fenerbahçe	191	(19)
2002–2006	İstanbulspor	75	(8)
2007–2008	Ocean Boys		
2008–2009	Bayelsa United		

International career
1990–1998	Nigeria	47	(3)
Medal record
Olympic medal record
Representing Nigeria
Men's Football
Gold medal – first place	1996 Atlanta	Team competition
- * Club domestic league appearances and goals

Uchechukwu Alozie "Uche" Okechukwu (// //; born 27 September 1967), also known as Deniz Uygar, is a Nigerian former professional footballer who played as a central defender.

"Uchechukwu" is an Igbo name meaning "God's will". He was also honoured as the foreign player who played in Turkey for the longest period of time (13 years), going on to obtain Turkish citizenship under the name Deniz Uygar.

The recipient of nearly 50 caps for Nigeria, Okechukwu represented the nation in two World Cups and as many Africa Cup of Nations, winning the latter tournament once.

== Club career ==
=== Early years and Denmark ===
Born in Lagos, Okechukwu started his career playing with Falcons Football Club of Aba under coach Christo Davis. He moved to Flash Flamingoes, formerly New Nigerian Bank FC of Benin and Iwuanyanwu Nationale, winning the 1988 and 1989 Nigeria Premier League with the latter.

In July 1990 he moved abroad to join Danish club Brøndby IF, being signed by newly appointed coach Morten Olsen alongside teammate Friday Elahor. Soon a part of the starting XI, Okechukwu helped the team win the 1990 and 1991 Danish championship, and was one of the mainstays of the squad that reached the semifinals of the 1990–91 UEFA Cup; while Elahor was touted by some as the next Brian Laudrup, he would soon leave for Africa Sports, while Okechukwu would be named the 1992's Brøndby IF Player of the Year.

=== Turkey and retirement ===
After appearing in the 1992 African Cup of Nations, where Nigeria reached the semi-finals, Okechukwu was linked to Turkish side Fenerbahçe for half a year, until he was bought in a DKK8 million transfer deal in November 1993. At Istanbul, he formed a defensive duo with former Brøndby teammate Jes Høgh, helping the club to its first Süper Lig championship in seven years in 1996.

Okechukwu played a further four seasons with Fenerbahçe, repeating league accolades in 2000–01. After nearly 250 official games he moved to fellow league team İstanbulspor, returning in 2007 to Nigeria first with Ocean Boys then with Bayelsa United (joining the latter in July 2008, and retiring shortly after, aged 41).

== International career ==
Okechukwu made his debut for the Nigeria national team at the 1990 African Cup of Nations tournament, in a 5–1 loss against Algeria in their opening game. For the remainder of the competition the Super Eagles' defense did not concede another goal, until they were beaten 1–0 by the same opponent in the final.

Altogether, Okechukwu played 47 internationals, winning the CAN in 1994 (2–1 against Zambia) and the 1996 Summer Olympics. He also represented the nation in two FIFA World Cups, helping it progress to two consecutive round-of- 16 contests as he appeared in seven complete matches combined, only missing out in the group stage 3–1 loss to Paraguay due to having collected two yellow cards.

Okechukwu retired after the 1998 edition's 4–1 loss to Denmark, having captained the squad on several occasions from 1996 onwards.

== Honours ==
Iwuanyanwu Nationale

- Nigeria Premier League: 1987–88, 1988–89

Brøndby

- Danish Superliga: 1990, 1991

Fenerbahçe

- 1.Lig: 1995–96, 2000–01
- Prime Minister's Cup: 1998
- Atatürk Cup: 1998

Nigeria

- Africa Cup of Nations: 1994
- Summer Olympic Games: 1996

Individual

- Brøndby Player of the Year: 1992
