= Aboubakari Ouattara =

Burkinabé footballer

Personal information
- Date of birth: 20 December 1970 (age 55)

International career
Years	Team	Apps	(Gls)
1992–1996	Burkina Faso	16	(2)

Aboubakari Ouattara (born 20 December 1970) is a Burkinabé footballer. He played in 16 matches for the Burkina Faso national football team from 1992 to 1996. He was also named in Burkina Faso's squad for the 1996 African Cup of Nations tournament.
