= Ibrahima N'Diaye (footballer) =

Senegalese footballer

Personal information
- Date of birth: 26 February 1964 (age 62)
- Position: Defender

Senior career*
Years	Team	Apps	(Gls)
1991–1992	Étoile Sportive du Sahel		

International career
1992–1995	Senegal	7	(0)
- * Club domestic league appearances and goals

Ibrahima N'Diaye (born 26 February 1964) is a Senegalese former professional footballer who played as a defender. He made seven appearances for the Senegal national team from 1992 to 1995. He was also named in Senegal's squad for the 1992 African Cup of Nations tournament.
