= Jacob Ewane =

Cameroonian footballer

Personal information
- Date of birth: 11 February 1967 (age 59)
- Place of birth: Douala, Cameroon
- Height: 1.76 m (5 ft 9 1/2 in)
- Position: Midfielder

Senior career*
Years	Team	Apps	(Gls)
1989–1991	Canon Yaoundé		
1991–1995	Excelsior Mouscron	26	(3)
1998–1999	Ronse		
Total		26	(3)

International career
1989–1994	Cameroon		
- * Club domestic league appearances and goals

Jacob Ewane (born 11 February 1967) is a Cameroonian former international footballer who played as a midfielder.
