= Transcom =

Swedish call center company

Transcom WorldWide

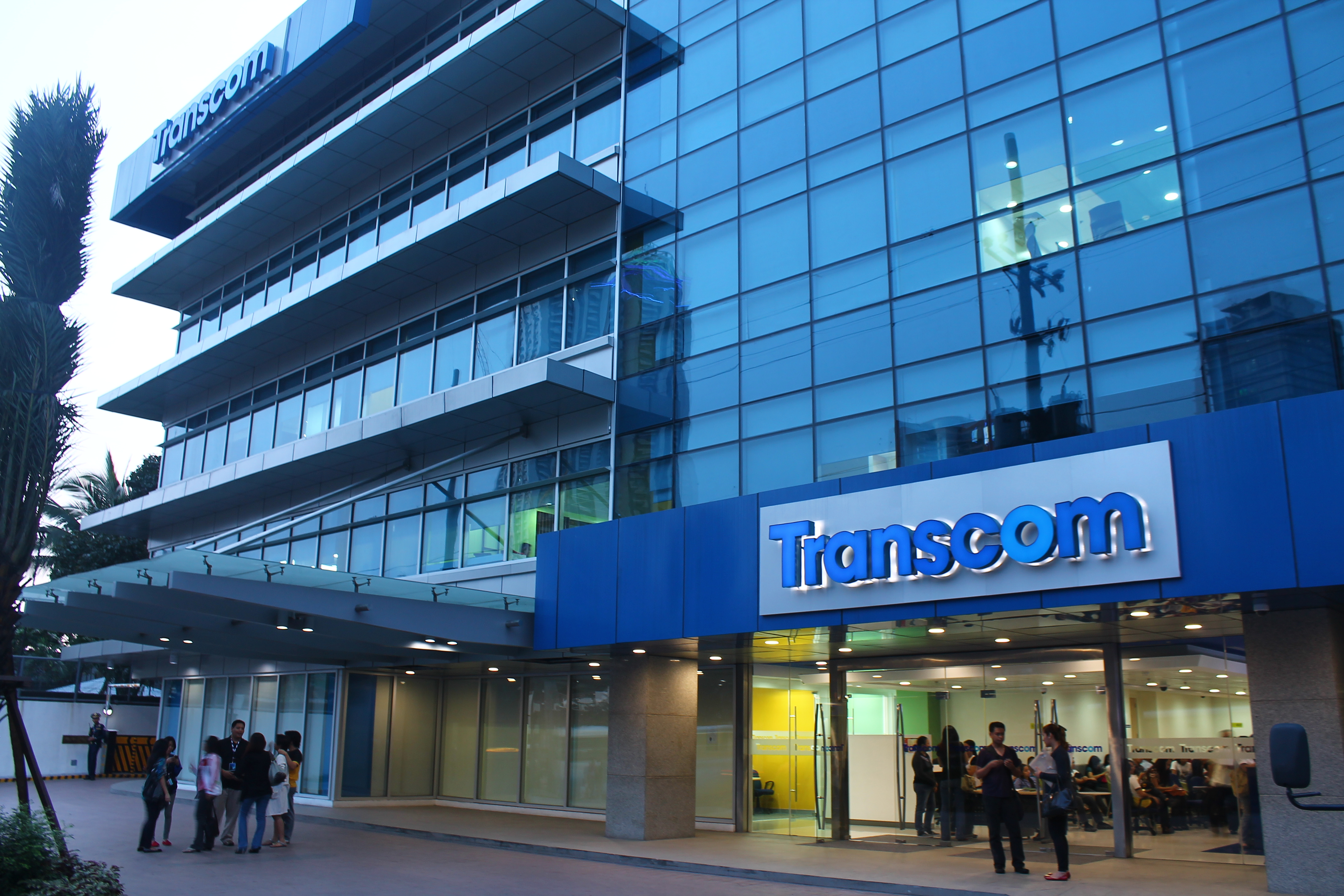
- Transcom Asia building in Metro Manila
- Type: Public (Nasdaq Stockholm, ticker: TWW, ISIN SE0006168316)
- Industry: Offshore outsourcing; Outsourcing
- Founded: 1995; 31 years ago
- Headquarters: Stockholm, Sweden
- Products: Customer relationship management, cash collection, statutory interpretation, legal services
- Website: http://www.transcom.com/

Transcom WorldWide AB is a Swedish outsourcing company which provides customer care, sales, technical support, and collections services through an extensive network of contact centers and work-at-home agents.

The company operates in Europe, North and South America, Asia and North Africa. Transcom employs 29,000 customer experience specialists at 50 contact centers across 21 countries, delivering services in 33 languages to international brands in various industry verticals.

On December 21, 2016, Altor announced a public cash offer to the shareholders of Transcom to transfer all of their shares in Transcom to Altor. At the expiry of the final acceptance period in March 2017, Altor owned over 98 percent of the shares and votes in Transcom. The last day of trading in the Transcom share was 10 April 2017. Altor has resolved to call for compulsory redemption of the remaining shares in the company.

== History ==
On August 27, 2007, Transcom announced that it had acquired 100% of NuComm International for CAD$90 million. Réal Bergevin, the founder and CEO of NuComm, signed a contract to remain with the business under the new ownership.

Transcom has a presence of 50 contact centers in addition to a large network of home agents in the following countries: Egypt, Canada, Croatia, Estonia, Germany, Hungary, Italy, Latvia, Lithuania, the Netherlands, Norway, the Philippines, Poland, Portugal, Serbia, Spain, Sweden, Tunisia, the United Kingdom, and the United States.

On 1 December 2021, Transcom announced it would be opening a new call center in Greenville, South Carolina. The location is expected to create a minimum of 450 jobs in the new 33,000 sq. ft. space.

Brian Johnson was named president & CEO of Transcom on March 25, 2024.
