= Friday Ekpo =

Nigerian footballer (born 1969)

Personal information
- Date of birth: 13 August 1969 (age 57)
- Place of birth: Surulere, Nigeria
- Position: Midfielder

International career
Years	Team	Apps	(Gls)
1989–1993	Nigeria	19	(5)

Friday Ekpo (born 13 August 1969) is a Nigerian footballer. He played in 19 matches for the Nigeria national football team from 1989 to 1993. He was also named in Nigeria's squad for the 1992 African Cup of Nations tournament.
