= Friday Elahor =

Nigerian footballer (born 1967)

Personal information
- Date of birth: 14 November 1967 (age 58)
- Position: Midfielder

Senior career*
Years	Team	Apps	(Gls)
1986	Bendel Insurance		
1987–1988	ACB Lagos		
1989	Iwuanyanwu Nationale		
1990–1992	Brøndby	14	(1)
1992–1994	Africa Sports		
1995	Nigerdock Lagos		
1997–1998	FC Kochin		
1998–1999	Mohun Bagan		

International career
1990–1993	Nigeria	14	(1)
- * Club domestic league appearances and goals

Friday Elahor (born 14 November 1967) is a Nigerian former footballer who played at both professional and international levels as a midfielder.

== Career ==
Elahor played club football in Nigeria, Denmark, Ivory Coast and India for Bendel Insurance, ACB Lagos, Iwuanyanwu Nationale, Brøndby, Africa Sports, Nigerdock Lagos, FC Kochin and Mohun Bagan.

He also earned 14 caps for the Nigeria national team between 1990 and 1993, and participated at the 1990 African Cup of Nations.
