= Congo national football team =

Men's association football team

Congo
- Nickname(s): Diables Rouges (The Red Devils); Guerriers de l'Équateur (Warriors of the Equator)
- Association: Fédération Congolaise de Football (FECOFOOT)
- Confederation: CAF (Africa)
- Sub-confederation: UNIFFAC (Central Africa)
- Head coach: Vacant
- Captain: Béranger Itoua
- Most caps: Jonas Bahamboula; Delvin N'Dinga (56)
- Top scorer: Thievy Bifouma (16)
- Home stadium: Stade ya mbanza Kintélé; Stade Alphonse Massemba-Débat
- FIFA code: CGO
First colours	Second colours	Third colours

FIFA ranking
- Current: 137 ▼5 (18 November 2026)
- Highest: 42 (September 2015)
- Lowest: 144 (September 2011)

First international
- (France) French Congo 5–1 Cameroon (France) (Middle Congo; 1954)

Biggest win
- Congo 11–0 Chad (Congo; 28 March 1964); Congo 11–0 São Tomé and Príncipe (Libreville, Gabon; 7 July 1976)

Biggest defeat
- Malagasy Republic 8–1 Congo (Antananarivo, Madagascar; 18 April 1960)

Africa Cup of Nations
- Appearances: 7 (first in 1968)
- Best result: Champions (1972)

The Congo national football team (French: Équipe du Congo de football) represents the Republic of the Congo in men's association football and is governed by the Congolese Football Federation. They have never qualified for the World Cup, but did win the Africa Cup of Nations in 1972. They also won the All-Africa Games football tournament in 1965. The team is also a member of both FIFA and the Confederation of African Football (CAF).

== History ==
The Congo national football team made its first ever appearance in February 1960 in a friendly against the Ivory Coast which they lost 4–2. On 13 April, they defeated Reunion 4–1 in their first game to advance to the quarter-finals. In their quarter-final on 15 April, they defeated the Ivory Coast 3–2. On 17 April, they lost 5–4 to Cameroon and were beaten 8–1 by the host Madagascar in the third-place play-off on 19 April.

In April 1963 they entered another L'Amitié competition, this time in Senegal, and were drawn in a group with Tunisia, the Ivory Coast, Democratic Republic of Congo and Mauritania. They lost their opener 2–0 to Tunisia on 13 April but beat the Ivory Coast 3–2 the next day. On 15 April they beat their neighbour Congo Kinshasa 2–1, and then Mauritania 11–0 two days later, but did not advance to the next round.

In July 1965 the Congo held the 1965 All-Africa Games and were drawn in a group with Mali, Uganda and Togo. They drew 1–1 with Mali on 18 July and beat Uganda 2–1 the next day. On 21 July they drew 1–1 against Togo but advanced through to the semi-finals, where they beat the Ivory Coast 1–0 on 23 July. On 25 July the Congo drew 0–0 versus Mali in the final, but won the tournament by having won ten corners in the final compared to Mali's one.

On 11 January 1967 the Congo played their first non-African opposition, defeating Romania 1–0 in a home friendly. On 19 February 1967 the Congo travelled to Tunisia for their first ever African Cup of Nations qualifier, drawing 1–1. On 2 August 1967 they hosted a qualifier against Cameroon, and defeated them 2–1 to top their qualifying group and advance to their first finals.

The finals were held in Ethiopia in January 1968 and the Congo were drawn in a group with their neighbour Zaire, Senegal and Ghana. They lost the opener to Zaire 3–0 on 12 January and two days later lost 2–1 to Senegal. On 16 January the Congo were defeated 3–1 by Ghana and were knocked out.

The Congo hosted a friendly against Romania for the second successive year on 16 June 1968 and won 4–2. On 30 July 1968 they played their first ever South American opposition, losing a home friendly 2–0 to Brazil.

In 1972, the Congo won their only African Cup of Nations title. Congo defeated host Cameroon in the semi-final 1–0 before beating Mali 3–2 to claim the championship. On that squad was arguably Congo's most famous player, François M'Pelé, who starred for PSG in the 1970s.

In qualification for the 1998 World Cup, the Congo came within a win of qualifying for the final tournament. However, after home wins over Zambia, DR Congo and South Africa, Congo lost their final match 1–0 away to South Africa and was eliminated.

In February 2025 Congo was suspended from international competitions by FIFA due to "third-party interference" in FECOFOOT - Congolese football's governing body.

== Results and fixtures ==
The following is a list of match results in the last 12 months, as well as any future matches that have been scheduled.

Win Draw Loss Fixture

=== 2026 ===
24 September 2027 AFCON qualification	Namibia	1–0	Congo	Gaborone, Botswana
15:00 UTC+0	Muzeu 47'	Report		Stadium: Botswana National Stadium; Referee: Mehrez Melki (Tunisia)

29 September 2027 AFCON qualification	Congo	1–1	Cameroon	Brazzaville, Congo
21:00 UTC+0	Bantsiele 24'	Report	Zinga 53' (o.g.)	Stadium: Alphonse Massemba-Débat Stadium; Referee: Clément Franklin Kpan (Ivory Coast)

13 November 2027 AFCON qualification	Comoros	0–0	Congo	Iconi, Comoros
TBD		Report		Stadium: Stade Omnisports de Malouzini; Referee: Issa Sy (Senegal)

17 November 2027 AFCON qualification	Congo	0–1	Comoros	Brazzaville, Congo
20:00 UTC+0		Report	Hamada 32'	Stadium: Stade Alphonse Massemba-Débat; Referee: Ali Brahamou Sadou (Niger)

=== 2027 ===
24 March 2027 AFCON qualification	Congo	v	Namibia	TBD, Congo
TBD				Stadium: TBD

28 March 2027 AFCON qualification	Cameroon	v	Congo	TBD, Cameroon
TBD				Stadium: TBD

== Coaching staff ==
Position	Name
Head coach	Vacant
Assistant coach	(Senegal) Omar Daf
Goalkeeping coach	(Republic of the Congo) Gérald Mbandaka
Fitness coach	(Republic of the Congo) Formose Kimbuta
Match analyst	(Republic of the Congo) François Mpanga
Doctors	(Republic of the Congo) Dr. Stéphane Mavungu (Republic of the Congo) Dr. Gervais Tchibinda
Physiotherapists	(Republic of the Congo) Aurélien Kimpembe (Republic of the Congo) Maurice Mvoungou (Republic of the Congo) Loïc Kimbela (Republic of the Congo) Jérôme Tchuka
Team coordinator	(Republic of the Congo) Hervé Ngolo
Technical director	(Republic of the Congo) Maxime Nzassi

=== Coaching history ===
- (Republic of the Congo) Paul Ebondzibato (1962–1964)
- (Soviet Union) Vasily Sokolov (1964–1965)
- (Republic of the Congo) Paul Ebondzibato (1965–1970)
- (Republic of the Congo) Adolphe Bibanzoulou (1970–1973)
- (Republic of the Congo) Robert Ndoudi (1973–1974)
- (Romania) Cicerone Manolache (1974–1976)
- (Socialist Federal Republic of Yugoslavia) Zoran Ristić (1984)
- (France) Yvon Goujon (1986–1987)
- (Republic of the Congo) Noël Minga (1992–1993, 2001)
- (Republic of the Congo) David Mémy (1997–1998)
- (Republic of the Congo) Alain Nestor Ngouinda (1998–1999)
- (Republic of the Congo) David Mémy (1999–2000)
- (Republic of the Congo) Camille Ngakosso (2000)
- (Republic of the Congo) Gaston Tchangana (2001, 2005–2006, 2007–2008)
- (Romania) Eugen Moldovan (2001–2002)
- (Republic of the Congo) Alain Nestor Ngouinda (2002)
- (Switzerland) Claude Andrey (2002–2003)
- (Netherlands) Tahseen Jabbary (2002–2003)
- (France) Jean-Paul Bernard (2003)
- (France) Christian Létard (2004–2005)
- (France) Noël Tosi (2006–2007)
- (Serbia) Ivica Todorov (2008–2010)
- (France) Robert Corfou (2010–2011)
- (Republic of the Congo) Camille Ngakosso (2011)
- (France) Jean-Guy Wallemme (2011–2012)
- (France) Kamel Djabour (2012–2013)
- (France) Claude Le Roy (2013–2015)
- (France) Pierre Lechantre (2016)
- (Republic of the Congo) Barthélémy Ngatsono (2016–2017)
- (France) Sébastien Migné (2017–2018)
- (Brazil) Valdo Filho (2018–2021)
- (Belgium) Paul Put (2021–2023)
- (France) Isaac Ngata (2023–2025)
- (Republic of the Congo) Barthélémy Ngatsono (2025)
- (Italy) Fabrizio Cesana (2025)
- (France) Claude Le Roy (2026)

== Players ==
=== Current squad ===
The following players have been selected for the 2027 Africa Cup of Nations qualification matches against Comoros on 11 and 15 November 2026.

Caps and goals are correct as of 17 November 2026, after the second match against Comoros

No.	Pos.	Player	Date of birth (age)	Caps	Goals	Club
	GK	Trey Vimalin	28 January 2001 (age 25)	4	0	(French Football Federation) Torcy
	GK	Perrauld Ndinga	8 May 1999 (age 27)	3	0	(Football Kenya Federation) Tusker
	GK	Melvin Zinga	16 March 2002 (age 24)	3	0	(French Football Federation) Angers
	DF	Yhoan Andzouana	13 December 1996 (age 29)	17	0	(Turkish Football Federation) Konyaspor
	DF	Bradley Mazikou	2 June 1996 (age 30)	12	0	(Swiss Football Association) Servette
	DF	Bryan Passi	5 August 1997 (age 29)	12	0	(French Football Federation) Valenciennes
	DF	Janard Mbemba	6 March 2002 (age 24)	11	0	(Sudan Football Association) Al Merrikh
	DF	Morgan Poaty	15 July 1997 (age 29)	11	0	(Swiss Football Association) Lausanne-Sport
	DF	Christ Makosso	9 May 2004 (age 22)	9	0	(French Football Federation) Auxerre
	DF	Nehemiah Fernandez	11 December 2004 (age 21)	2	0	(French Football Federation) Nancy
	DF	Kévin Mouanga	24 July 2000 (age 26)	0	0	(Turkish Football Federation) Kasımpaşa
	MF	Gaius Makouta	25 July 1997 (age 29)	27	2	(Turkish Football Federation) Alanyaspor
	MF	Merveille Ndockyt	20 July 1998 (age 28)	27	1	(Royal Moroccan Football Federation) AS FAR
	MF	Antoine Makoumbou	18 July 1998 (age 28)	20	1	(Italian Football Federation) Sampdoria
	MF	Chandrel Massanga	17 August 1999 (age 27)	14	1	(Turkish Football Federation) Eyüpspor
	MF	Fred Dembi	21 February 1995 (age 31)	13	1	(United Arab Emirates Football Association) Al Hamriyah
	MF	Inno Loemba	4 August 2004 (age 22)	6	0	(Tanzania Football Federation) Simba
	MF	Will Hondermarck	21 November 2000 (age 25)	3	0	(The Football Association) Bromley
	FW	Thievy Bifouma	13 May 1992 (age 34)	41	16	(Football Federation Islamic Republic of Iran) Persepolis
	FW	Guy Mbenza	1 April 2000 (age 26)	22	5	(Chinese Football Association) Liaoning Tieren
	FW	Mons Bassouamina	28 May 1998 (age 28)	17	3	(Portuguese Football Federation) Marítimo
	FW	Beni Namboka	4 June 2004 (age 22)	5	0	(Congolese Football Federation) Maniema Union
	FW	Geltany Stalgout Bantsiele	30 October 2006 (age 20)	4	1	(Congolese Football Federation) CARA Brazzaville
	FW	Yvan Ikia Dimi	26 September 2004 (age 22)	4	0	(Polish Football Association) Górnik Zabrze
	FW	Jordi Mboula	16 March 1999 (age 27)	2	0	(Hellenic Football Federation) Kifisia

=== Recent call-ups ===
The following players were called up for Congo in the last 12 months.

Pos.	Player	Date of birth (age)	Caps	Goals	Club	Latest call-up
GK	Chelcy Bonazebi	18 May 2006 (age 20)	1	0	(Republic of the Congo) CARA Brazzaville	v. Comoros, 11 November 2026 ^{PRE}
DF	Prince Mouandza	23 October 2001 (age 25)	11	1	(Republic of the Congo) Otohô	v. Comoros, 11 November 2026 ^{PRE}
DF	Jérémy Mounsesse	1 September 2005 (age 21)	1	0	(Portugal) Torreense	v. Comoros, 11 November 2026 ^{PRE}
DF	Godefroy Loubemba		0	0	(Republic of the Congo) CARA Brazzaville	v. Comoros, 11 November 2026 ^{PRE}
DF	Brayann Pereira	21 May 2003 (age 23)	0	0	(England) West Bromwich Albion	v. Cameroon, 29 September 2026
MF	Obed Masongisa	28 February 2005 (age 21)	0	0	(Republic of the Congo) Otohô	v. Comoros, 11 November 2026 ^{PRE}
MF	Niels Nkounkou	1 November 2000 (age 26)	0	0	(France) Nice	v. Comoros, 11 November 2026 ^{PRE}
FW	Déo Bassinga	11 August 2005 (age 21)	9	1	(Morocco) FUS Rabat	v. Comoros, 11 November 2026 ^{PRE}
FW	Christopher Ibayi	18 July 1995 (age 31)	5	2	(Morocco) MAS	v. Comoros, 11 November 2026 ^{PRE}
FW	Domi Massoumou	4 June 2003 (age 23)	5	0	(Armenia) Alashkert	v. Comoros, 11 November 2026 ^{PRE}
FW	Kévin Monzialo	28 July 2000 (age 26)	1	0	(Netherlands) Den Bosch	v. Comoros, 11 November 2026 ^{PRE}
^{DEC} Player refused to join the team after the call-up.; ^{INJ} Player withdrew from the squad due to an injury.; ^{PRE} Preliminary squad.; ^{RET} Player has retired from international football.; ^{SUS} Suspended from the national team.

== Records ==
As of 14 October 2025
Players in bold are still active with Congo.

=== Most appearances ===
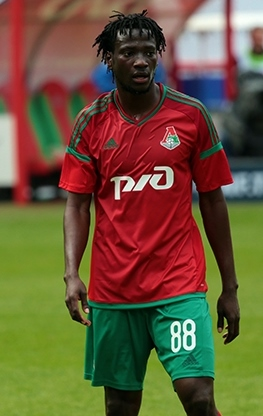
Delvin N'Dinga is Congo's joint-most capped player with 56 appearances.

Rank	Player	Caps	Goals	Career
1	Jonas Bahamboula	56	13	1969–1982
1	Delvin N'Dinga	56	1	2008–2021
3	Destin Makita	55	1	2001–2013
4	Barel Mouko	51	1	2004–2018
5	Magnoléké Bissiki	45	0	2012–2021
6	Oscar Ewolo	44	2	2000–2013
7	Prince Oniangué	43	8	2008–2019
8	Thievy Bifouma	41	16	2014–2023
8	Francis N'Ganga	41	3	2008–2017
10	**Christoffer Mafoumbi**	38	0	2012–present
10	Brice Samba	38	0	1990–2001

=== Top goalscorers ===
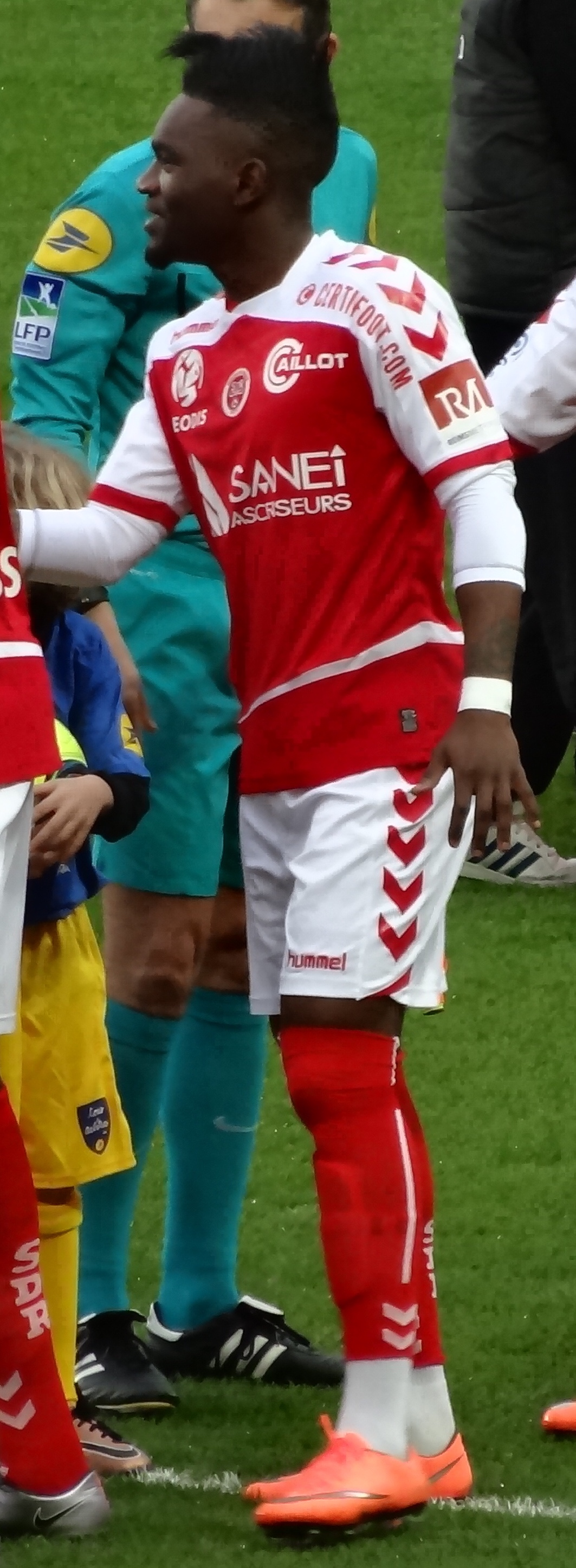
Thievy Bifouma is Congo's top scorer with 16 goals.

Rank	Player	Goals	Caps	Ratio	Career
1	Thievy Bifouma	16	41	0.39	2014–2023
2	Jonas Bahamboula	13	56	0.23	1969–1982
3	François M'Pelé	12	29	0.41	1971–1978
4	Paul Moukila	11	31	0.35	1970–1978
5	Anges Ngapy	10	33	0.3	1984–1993
5	Férébory Doré	10	37	0.27	2010–2017
7	Jean-Jacques N'Domba	8	35	0.23	1974–1992
7	Prince Oniangué	8	43	0.19	2008–2019
9	Kader Bidimbou	5	13	0.38	2014–2023
9	Guy Mbenza	5	21	0.24	2017–2023
9	Rolf-Christel Guié-Mien	5	25	0.2	1996–2008
9	Hardy Binguila	5	29	0.17	2013–2023
9	**Silvère Ganvoula**	5	29	0.17	2014–present
9	Fabrice Ondama	5	37	0.14	2006–2017

== Competition records ==
=== FIFA World Cup ===
FIFA World Cup record									Qualification record					
Year	Round	Position	Pld	W	D*	L	GF	GA	Pld	W	D	L	GF	GA
1930 to 1958	Part of France								Part of France					
as Congo-Brazzaville
(Chile) 1962	Not a FIFA member								Not a FIFA member					
(England) 1966	Entry not accepted by FIFA								Entry not accepted by FIFA					
as People's Republic of the Congo
(Mexico) 1970	Did not enter								Did not enter					
(West Germany) 1974	Did not qualify								2	0	1	1	2	3
(Argentina) 1978	Did not qualify								4	1	1	2	7	8
(Spain) 1982	Did not enter								Did not enter					
(Mexico) 1986	Did not enter								Did not enter					
(Italy) 1990	Did not enter								Did not enter					
as Republic of the Congo
(United States) 1994	Did not qualify								4	0	0	4	0	5
(France) 1998	Did not qualify								8	4	2	2	8	6
(South Korea) (Japan) 2002	Did not qualify								10	3	2	5	10	17
(Germany) 2006	Did not qualify								12	4	2	6	12	15
(South Africa) 2010	Did not qualify								6	3	0	3	7	8
(Brazil) 2014	Did not qualify								8	4	3	1	13	4
(Russia) 2018	Did not qualify								8	2	2	4	11	16
(Qatar) 2022	Did not qualify								6	0	3	3	5	10
(Canada) (Mexico) (United States) 2026	Did not qualify								8	0	1	7	4	24
(Morocco) (Portugal) (Spain) 2030	To be determined								To be determined					
(Saudi Arabia) 2034	To be determined								To be determined					
Total		0/15							76	21	17	38	79	116

=== Africa Cup of Nations ===
Africa Cup of Nations record
Year	Round	Position	Pld	W	D	L	GF	GA
(Sudan) 1957	Part of France							
(United Arab Republic) 1959	Part of France							
Played as Congo-Brazzaville
(Ethiopia) 1962	Not affiliated to CAF							
(Ghana) 1963	Not affiliated to CAF							
(Tunisia) 1965	Not affiliated to CAF							
(Ethiopia) 1968	Group stage	7th	3	0	0	3	2	8
Played as People's Republic of the Congo
(Sudan) 1970	Did not enter							
(Cameroon) 1972	Winners	1st	5	3	1	1	9	7
(Egypt) 1974	Fourth place	4th	5	2	1	2	7	10
(Ethiopia) 1976	Did not qualify							
(Ghana) 1978	Group stage	7th	3	0	1	2	1	4
(Nigeria) 1980	Did not qualify							
(Libya) 1982	Did not qualify							
(Ivory Coast) 1984	Did not qualify							
(Egypt) 1986	Did not qualify							
(Morocco) 1988	Did not qualify							
(Algeria) 1990	Did not enter							
Played as Republic of the Congo
(Senegal) 1992	Quarter-finals	5th	3	0	2	1	2	3
(Tunisia) 1994	Did not qualify							
(South Africa) 1996	Did not qualify							
(Burkina Faso) 1998	Did not qualify							
(Ghana) (Nigeria) 2000	Group stage	11th	3	0	1	2	0	2
(Mali) 2002	Did not qualify							
(Tunisia) 2004	Did not qualify							
(Egypt) 2006	Did not qualify							
(Ghana) 2008	Did not qualify							
(Angola) 2010	Did not qualify							
(Gabon) (Equatorial Guinea) 2012	Did not qualify							
(South Africa) 2013	Did not qualify							
(Equatorial Guinea) 2015	Quarter-finals	5th	4	2	1	1	6	6
(Gabon) 2017	Did not qualify							
(Egypt) 2019	Did not qualify							
(Cameroon) 2021	Did not qualify							
(Ivory Coast) 2023	Did not qualify							
(Morocco) 2025	Did not qualify							
(Kenya) (Tanzania) (Uganda) 2027	To be determined							
2028	To be determined							
Total	1 Title	7/35	26	7	7	12	27	40

=== African Games ===
African Games record
Year	Result	Pld	W	D	L	GF	GA
(Republic of the Congo) 1965	Gold	5	3	1	1	11	5
(Nigeria) 1973	6th	3	1	0	2	5	8
Total	2/4	8	4	1	3	16	13

== Honours ==
=== Continental ===
- CAF African Cup of Nations
  - Champions (1): 1972
- African Games^{1}
  - Gold medal (1): 1965

=== Regional ===
- CEMAC Cup
  - (gold) Champions (2): 2007, 2010
  - (silver) Runners-up (2): 2008, 2014
  - (bronze) Third place (2): 2003, 2013
- UDEAC Championship
  - (gold) Champions (1): 1990
  - (silver) Runners-up (2): 1984, 1985
  - (bronze) Third place (2): 1986, 1988
- Central African Games
  - (silver) Silver medal (2): 1976, 1981
  - (bronze) Bronze medal (1): 1987

=== Summary ===
Competition	1st place, gold medalist(s)	2nd place, silver medalist(s)	3rd place, bronze medalist(s)	Total
CAF African Cup of Nations	1	0	0	1
Total	1	0	0	1

Notes

1. Competition organized by ANOCA, officially not recognized by FIFA.
