= 1990 African Cup of Nations squads =

The list below details the squads that competed at the 1990 African Cup of Nations.

== Group A ==
=== Algeria ===
Coach: Abdelhamid Kermali

No.	Pos.	Player	Date of birth (age)	Caps	Club
1	GK	Larbi El Hadi	27 May 1961 (aged 28)		(Algeria) JS Kabylie
16	GK	Kamel Kadri	19 November 1963 (aged 26)		(Algeria) MC Alger
22	GK	Antar Osmani	22 February 1960 (aged 30)		(Algeria) ES Sétif
2	DF	Noureddine Bounaâs	18 October 1965 (aged 24)		(Algeria) MO Constantine
3	DF	Kamel Adjas	22 August 1961 (aged 28)		(Algeria) ES Sétif
4	DF	Ali Benhalima	21 January 1962 (aged 28)		(Algeria) MC Oran
5	DF	Rachid Adghigh*	1 July 1961 (aged 28)		(Algeria) JS Kabylie
5	DF	Messaoud Aït Abderrahmane*	11 November 1970 (aged 19)		(Algeria) JS Kabylie
8	DF	Djamel Amani	17 June 1962 (aged 27)		(Belgium) Royal Antwerp
13	DF	Lotfi Manaâ	21 November 1964 (aged 25)		(Algeria) USM Annaba
15	DF	Abdelhakim Serrar	24 April 1961 (aged 28)		(Algeria) ES Sétif
19	DF	Tarek Lazizi	8 June 1971 (aged 18)		(Algeria) MC Alger
20	DF	Fodil Megharia	23 May 1961 (aged 28)		(Tunisia) Club Africain
6	MF	Mahieddine Meftah	25 September 1968 (aged 21)		(Algeria) JS Kabylie
14	MF	Tahar Chérif El-Ouazzani	10 July 1967 (aged 22)		(Algeria) MC Oran
18	MF	Moussa Saïb	6 March 1969 (aged 20)		(Algeria) JS Kabylie
7	FW	Hamid Rahmouni	22 October 1967 (aged 22)		(Algeria) ES Sétif
9	FW	Djamel Menad	22 July 1960 (aged 29)		(France) Nîmes Olympique
10	FW	Chérif Oudjani	9 December 1964 (aged 25)		(France) FC Sochaux
11	FW	Rabah Madjer (c)	15 February 1958 (aged 32)		(Portugal) FC Porto
12	FW	Nacer Bouiche	16 May 1965 (aged 24)		(Algeria) JS Kabylie
17	FW	Mohamed Rahem	21 June 1970 (aged 19)		(Algeria) USM El Harrach
21	FW	Abderrazak Djahnit	2 January 1968 (aged 22)		(Algeria) JS Kabylie

*Rachid Adghigh seriously injured after the 2nd match, Algeria decided to replace him with Messaoud Aït Abderrahmane

=== Egypt ===
Coach: Hany Moustafa

No.	Pos.	Player	Date of birth (age)	Caps	Club
1	GK	Thabet El-Batal	16 September 1953 (aged 36)		(Egypt) Al-Ahly
	GK	Islam Yusef			(Egypt) Tersana SC
	GK	Basim Khairatl			(Egypt) El Shams SC
	DF	Fawzi Gamal	23 October 1966 (aged 23)		(Egypt) Ismaily
	DF	Hamada Sedki	25 August 1961 (aged 28)		(Egypt) Al-Ahly
	DF	Hesham Ibrahim	23 September 1966 (aged 23)		(Egypt) Al-Ahly
	DF	Mohamed Saad	10 February 1965 (aged 25)		(Egypt) Al-Ahly
	DF	Talaat Mansour	26 February 1967 (aged 23)		(Egypt) Al Masry SC
	DF	Mosheer Hanafi	1 November 1969 (aged 20)		(Egypt) Al-Ahly
	DF	Nabil Mahmoud	13 August 1968 (aged 21)		(Egypt) Zamalek
	MF	Taha El-Sayed			(Egypt) Al Mokawloon Al Arab SC
	MF	Ehab Galal	14 August 1967 (aged 22)		(Egypt) El Shams SC
	MF	Abdulhameed Fathallah			(Egypt) Al-Ahly
	MF	Mohamed Saad Shehata	8 February 1961 (aged 29)		(Egypt) Al Mokawloon Al Arab SC
	MF	Essam Marei	1 February 1965 (aged 25)		(Egypt) Al Mokawloon Al Arab SC
	MF	Ashraf Abu Al wafa			(Egypt) Suez SC
	FW	Adel Abdel Rahman	11 December 1967 (aged 22)		(Egypt) Al-Ahly
	FW	Ahmed Hamouda			(Egypt) Al-Ahly
	FW	Emad Salah	25 May 1964 (aged 25)		(Egypt) Zamalek
	FW	Abdel Azim El-Shoura			(Egypt) Ghazl El Mahalla
	FW	Yasser Rayyan	26 March 1970 (aged 19)		(Egypt) El Mansoura
	FW	Tarek Yehia	10 September 1961 (aged 28)		(Egypt) Zamalek

=== Ivory Coast ===
Coach: (Socialist Federal Republic of Yugoslavia) Radivoje Ognjanović

No.	Pos.	Player	Date of birth (age)	Caps	Club
1	GK	Alain Gouaméné	15 June 1966 (aged 23)		(Ivory Coast) ASEC Mimosas
22	GK	Obou Macaire	28 December 1970 (aged 19)		(Ivory Coast) Africa Sports
5	DF	Sékana Diaby	10 August 1968 (aged 21)		(France) RCF Paris
2	DF	Basile Aka Kouamé	6 April 1963 (aged 26)		(Ivory Coast) ASEC Abidjan
13	DF	Omar Tiero			(Ivory Coast)
12	DF	Georges Lignon	29 December 1968 (aged 21)		(Ivory Coast) Africa Sports
3	DF	Arsène Hobou	30 October 1967 (aged 22)		(Ivory Coast) ASEC Abidjan
21	DF	Ruffin Lué	5 January 1968 (aged 22)		(Ivory Coast) Africa Sports
7	MF	Saint-Joseph Gadji-Celi	1 March 1961 (aged 29)		(Ivory Coast) ASEC Mimosas
16	MF	Serge Maguy	20 October 1970 (aged 19)		(Ivory Coast) Africa Sports
	MF	Youssouf Fofana	26 July 1966 (aged 23)		(France) AS Monaco
18	MF	Pascal Miézan	3 April 1959 (aged 30)		(Ivory Coast) Africa Sports
8	MF	Oumar Ben Salah	2 July 1964 (aged 25)		(France) Avignon Football 84
4	MF	Yao Amani	17 September 1963 (aged 26)		(Ivory Coast) ASEC Abidjan
10	FW	Abdoulaye Traoré	4 March 1967 (aged 22)		(France) Avignon Football 84
11	FW	Dali Benoit Yohoua	10 August 1968 (aged 21)		(Ivory Coast) Africa Sports
	FW	Lucien Kassi-Kouadio	21 December 1963 (aged 26)		(Ivory Coast) ASEC Abidjan
6		Monghi			(Ivory Coast)

=== Nigeria ===
Coach: (Netherlands) Clemens Westerhof

No.	Pos.	Player	Date of birth (age)	Caps	Club
1	GK	Alloysius Agu	12 July 1967 (aged 22)		(Nigeria) ACB Lagos
2	DF	Abdul Aminu	21 February 1965 (aged 25)		(Nigeria) El-Kanemi Warriors
3	DF	Andrew Uwe	12 October 1967 (aged 22)		(Belgium) KSV Roeselare
4	DF	Uche Okechukwu	27 September 1967 (aged 22)		(Nigeria) Iwuanyanwu Nationale
6	MF	Thompson Oliha	4 October 1968 (aged 21)		(Nigeria) Iwuanyanwu Nationale
7	MF	Ayodele Ogunlana	1957		(Nigeria) Ranchers Bees
8	MF	Moses Kpakor	1 June 1965 (aged 24)		(Nigeria) BCC Lions
9	FW	Rashidi Yekini	23 October 1963 (aged 26)		(Ivory Coast) Africa Sports
10	MF	Emmanuel Okocha	20 December 1968 (aged 21)		(Nigeria) Enugu Rangers
11	MF	Ademola Adeshina	6 April 1964 (aged 25)		(Nigeria) Shooting Stars
12	DF	Herbert Anijekwu	4 December 1964 (aged 25)		(Nigeria) Enugu Rangers
13	DF	Bright Omokaro	24 February 1965 (aged 25)		(Nigeria) Shooting Stars
14	FW	Daniel Amokachi	30 December 1972 (aged 17)		(Nigeria) Ranchers Bees
15	DF	Benedict Iroha	29 November 1969 (aged 20)		(Nigeria) Iwuanyanwu Nationale
16	MF	Wasiu Ipaye	6 July 1968 (aged 21)		(Nigeria) First Bank FC
17	MF	Friday Elahor	14 November 1967 (aged 22)		(Denmark) Brøndby IF
18	GK	Christian Obi	2 January 1967 (aged 23)		(Nigeria) Julius Berger FC
19	DF	Isaac Semitoje	28 April 1968 (aged 21)		(Nigeria) Bendel Insurance
20	FW	Baldwin Bazuaye	9 September 1968 (aged 21)		(Nigeria) Bendel Insurance
21	MF	Tajudeen Oyekanmi	23 February 1973 (aged 17)		(Nigeria) Ranchers Bees
22	GK	Lucky Agbonsevbafe	12 August 1969 (aged 20)		(Nigeria) El-Kanemi Warriors

== Group B ==
=== Cameroon ===
Coach: (Soviet Union) Valery Nepomnyashchy

No.	Pos.	Player	Date of birth (age)	Caps	Club
	GK	William Andem	14 June 1968 (aged 21)		(Cameroon) Union Douala
	GK	Thomas Nkono	20 July 1955 (aged 34)		(Spain) RCD Espanyol
	DF	Bertin Ebwellé	11 September 1962 (aged 27)		(Cameroon) Tonnerre Yaoundé
	DF	Emmanuel Kundé	15 July 1956 (aged 33)		(Cameroon) Canon Yaoundé
	DF	Benjamin Massing	20 June 1962 (aged 27)		(France) Créteil
	DF	Jules Onana	12 June 1964 (aged 25)		(Cameroon) Canon Yaoundé
	DF	Jean-Claude Pagal	15 September 1964 (aged 25)		(France) La Roche VF
	DF	Stephen Tataw	31 March 1963 (aged 26)		(Cameroon) Tonnerre Yaoundé
	MF	Ernest Ebongué	15 May 1962 (aged 27)		(Portugal) Varzim S.C.
	MF	André Kana-Biyik	1 September 1965 (aged 24)		(France) FC Metz
	MF	Thomas Libiih	17 November 1967 (aged 22)		(Cameroon) Tonnerre Yaoundé
	MF	Emmanuel Maboang	27 November 1968 (aged 21)		(Cameroon) Canon Yaoundé
	MF	Louis-Paul Mfédé	26 February 1961 (aged 29)		(Cameroon) Canon Yaoundé
	FW	Bonaventure Djonkep	20 August 1961 (aged 28)		(Cameroon) Union Douala
	FW	Eugène Ekéké	30 May 1960 (aged 29)		(France) Valenciennes FC
	FW	Cyril Makanaky	28 June 1965 (aged 24)		(France) SC Toulon
	FW	François Omam-Biyik	21 May 1966 (aged 23)		(France) Stade Laval

=== Kenya ===
Coach: Mohammed Kheri

No.	Pos.	Player	Date of birth (age)	Caps	Club
	GK	John Busolo	13 March 1965 (aged 24)		(Kenya) Bandari
	GK	Washington Muhanji			(Kenya) Leopards
	DF	Wycliffe Anyangu			(Kenya) Leopards
	DF	Austin Oduor			(Kenya) Gor Mahia
	DF	Mickey Weche			(Kenya) Leopards
	DF	Tobias Ochola	1963		(Kenya) Gor Mahia
	MF	Paul Ochieng	1967		(Kenya) Gor Mahia
	MF	Abbas Khamis Magongo	1956		(Kenya) Gor Mahia
	MF	John Lukoye	1965		(Kenya) Leopards
	MF	George Onyango			(Kenya) Gor Mahia
	MF	Sammy Onyango	3 March 1961 (aged 28)		(Kenya) Kisumu Posta
	MF	Henry Nyandoro	20 October 1969 (aged 20)		(Kenya) Leopards
	MF	Paul Onyera			Kenya Breweries
	FW	Henry Motego	21 May 1964 (aged 25)		Kenya Breweries
	FW	Peter Dawo	1964		(Kenya) Gor Mahia
	FW	Mike Origi	16 November 1967 (aged 22)		Kenya Breweries
	FW	John Odie	5 July 1964 (aged 25)		(Kenya) Reunion
	FW	Anthony Ndolo			(Kenya)
	MF	Mulupi Makuto			(Kenya)

=== Senegal ===
Coach: (France) Claude Le Roy

No.	Pos.	Player	Date of birth (age)	Caps	Club
16	GK	Abdou M'Baye			(Senegal)
1	GK	Cheikh Seck	8 January 1958 (aged 32)		(Tunisia) ES Tunis
9	DF	Mustapha Diagne	15 August 1966 (aged 23)		(France) Grenoble Foot
2	DF	Pape Fall	19 January 1960 (aged 30)		(France) Caen
3	DF	Adolphe Mendy	16 January 1960 (aged 30)		(Senegal) ASC Port Autonome
5	DF	Roger Mendy	8 February 1960 (aged 30)		(France) AS Monaco
	DF	Mamadou Tew	27 November 1959 (aged 30)		(Belgium) Club Brugge
12	MF	Adama Cissé	21 March 1967 (aged 22)		(Senegal) ASC Diaraf
10	MF	Jules Bocandé	25 November 1958 (aged 31)		(France) OGC Nice
6	MF	Lamine Sagna	17 November 1969 (aged 20)		(Senegal) ASC Diaraf
15	MF	Sylvestre Coly			(Senegal) Casa Sport
	MF	Mamadou Gueye			(Senegal)
	MF	Youssou Mbengue			(Senegal)
8	MF	Baytir Samb			(Senegal)
7	FW	Abdoulaye Diallo	27 January 1963 (aged 27)		(France) Marseille
17	FW	Mamadou Diallo	21 August 1971 (aged 18)		(Senegal) Sotrac FC
14	FW	Lamine N'Diaye	18 October 1956 (aged 33)		(France) Mulhouse
18	FW	Moussa N'Dao	15 July 1968 (aged 21)		(Morocco) WAC Casablanca
	FW	Souleyman Sané	26 February 1961 (aged 29)		(Germany) 1. FC Nürnberg
19	FW	Mamadou Diarra	18 October 1970 (aged 19)		(Senegal) ASC Port Autonome

=== Zambia ===
Coach: Samuel Ndhlovu

No.	Pos.	Player	Date of birth (age)	Caps	Club
1	GK	David Chabala	2 February 1960 (aged 30)		(Zambia) Mufulira Wanderers
	DF	Whiteson Changwe	19 October 1964 (aged 25)		(Zambia) Kabwe Warriors
	DF	Samuel Chomba	5 January 1964 (aged 26)		(Zambia) Kabwe Warriors
	DF	John Soko	5 May 1968 (aged 21)		(Zambia) Nkana Red Devils
	DF	Kapambwe Mulenga	1963 (aged 27)		(Zambia) Nkana Red Devils
	MF	Joel Bwalya	24 October 1972 (aged 17)		(Zambia) Mufulira Wanderers
	MF	Wisdom Mumba Chansa	17 April 1964 (aged 25)		(Zambia) Power Dynamos
	MF	Linos Makwaza	4 December 1965 (aged 24)		(Zambia) Power Dynamos
	MF	Eston Mulenga	6 August 1961 (aged 28)		(Zambia) Nkana Red Devils
	MF	Lucky Msiska	17 March 1960 (aged 29)		(Belgium) KSV Roeselare
	MF	Derby Makinka	5 September 1965 (aged 24)		(Zimbabwe) Darryn T
	MF	Beston Chambeshi	4 April 1960 (aged 29)		(Zambia) Nkana Red Devils
	FW	Philemon Chisala	11 November 1966 (aged 23)		(Zambia) Mufulira Wanderers
	MF	Webster Chikabala	27 March 1965 (aged 24)		(Zambia) Nchanga Rangers
	FW	Kenneth Malitoli	20 August 1966 (aged 23)		(Zambia) Nkana Red Devils
	FW	Geoffrey Mulenga	12 October 1967 (aged 22)		(Switzerland) FC Fribourg
	FW	Pearson Mwanza	1 January 1968 (aged 22)		(Zambia) Power Dynamos
	FW	Timothy Mwitwa	21 May 1968 (aged 21)		(Zambia) Kabwe Warriors
