= 1982–83 ES Sétif season =

EP Sétif
1982–83 season
- Head coach: Abdelhamid Kermali
- Stadium: Stade 8 Mai 1945
- National 1: Runners-up
- Algerian Cup: Quarter-finals
- Top goalscorer: Nacer Adjissa (12 goals)

In the 1982–83 season, EP Sétif was competing in the National 1 for the 19th time, as well as the Algerian Cup. It was their 19th consecutive season in the top flight of Algerian football. They competed in National 1 and the Algerian Cup.

== Squad list ==
Players and squad numbers last updated on 1 September 1982.
Note: Flags indicate national team as has been defined under FIFA eligibility rules. Players may hold more than one non-FIFA nationality.

Nat.	Position	Name	Date of Birth (Age)	Signed from
Goalkeepers
(Algeria)	GK	Bouzidi Cheniti	19 June 1951 (aged 31)	
(Algeria)	GK	Antar Osmani	22 February 1960 (aged 22)	Reserve team
Defenders
(Algeria)		Bachir Abaoui	18 February 1958 (aged 24)	
(Algeria)		Boualem Khalfi	12 April 1952 (aged 30)	
(Algeria)		Djamel Nebti	10 August 1956 (aged 26)	
(Algeria)	CB	Abdelhakim Serrar	26 April 1961 (aged 21)	Reserve team
Midfielders
(Algeria)		El Ayachi Arabat	12 November 1953 (aged 28)	
(Algeria)		Djamel Chaibi	25 April 1960 (aged 22)	
Forwards
(Algeria)		Nacer Adjissa	31 March 1957 (aged 25)	Reserve team
(Algeria)	ST	Derradji Bendjaballah	6 March 1958 (aged 24)	Reserve team
(Algeria)		Abdelkrim Khalfa	25 October 1955 (aged 26)	
(Algeria)		Hocine Saoud	25 March 1953 (aged 29)	
(Algeria)	FW	Mustapha Gharib		

== Competitions ==
=== Overview ===
Competition	Record								Started round	Final position / round	First match	Last match
Competition	G	W	D	L	GF	GA	GD	Win %	Started round	Final position / round	First match	Last match
National 1	30	14	10	6	40	19	+21	46.67	—	Runners-up	24 September 1982	17 June 1983
Algerian Cup	3	2	0	1	5	3	+2	66.67	Round of 32	Quarter-finals	4 February 1983	1 April 1983
Total	33	16	10	7	45	22	+23	48.48				

=== National 1 ===
==== League table ====
Pos	Team	Pld	W	D	L	GF	GA	GD	Pts	Qualification or relegation
1	JE Tizi-Ouzou	30	17	7	6	41	22	+19	71	League Champions, qualified for African Cup
2	EP Sétif	30	14	10	6	40	19	+21	68	
3	ESM Bel-Abbès	30	9	14	7	22	32	−10	62	
4	MP Alger	30	10	10	10	35	33	+2	60	Algerian Cup Winner, qualified for Cup Winners' Cup
5	MP Oran	30	9	12	9	29	26	+3	59 (Note: 1 point deducted?)	

Source: rsssf.com

=== Results by round ===
Round	1	2	3	4	5	6	7	8	9	10	11	12	13	14	15	16	17	18	19	20	21	22	23	24	25	26	27	28	29	30
Ground	A	H	H	A	H	A	H	A	H	A	H	A	H	A	H	H	A	A	H	A	H	A	H	A	H	A	H	A	H	A
Result	L	W	W	W	W	L	W	D	W	D	D	D	L	L	W	W	D	D	W	D	W	L	W	D	D	D	W	W	W	L
Position	14	9	4	2	1	2	2	2	2	2	2	2	2	4	4	2	2	2	2	2	2	2	2	2	2	2	2	2	2	2

Source: Competitive matches
A = Away; H = Home; W = Win; D = Draw; L = Loss

=== Matches ===
22 October 1982 Round 1	USK Alger	2–1	EP Sétif	Bologhine
	Guedioura 1'; Diab 90'		Khalfa 39'	Stadium: Omar Hamadi Stadium; Attendance: 7.138; Referee: Djezzar

24 September 1982 Round 2	EP Sétif	3–0	MP Oran	Sétif
				Stadium: Stade 8 Mai 1945

1 October 1982 Round 3	EP Sétif	3–0	USM El Harrach	Sétif
	Khalfa 13'; Arabat 21'; Adjissa 61'			Stadium: Stade 8 Mai 1945; Referee: Segheiri

8 October 1982 Round 4	MA Hussein Dey	0–1	EP Sétif	?
			Abouci 24'	Stadium: ?

15 October 1982 Round 5	EP Sétif	1–0	ESM Bel-Abbès	Sétif
	Adjissa 32'			Stadium: Stade 8 Mai 1945; Referee: Medjiha

29 October 1982 Round 6	GCR Mascara	1–0	EP Sétif	Mascara
				Stadium: Stade Meftah Aouad; Attendance: 10,000; Referee: Kerlit

5 November 1982 Round 7	EP Sétif	1–0	WKF Collo	Sétif
				Stadium: Stade 8 Mai 1945

12 November 1982 Round 8	MP Alger	2–2	EP Sétif	Algiers
	Bouiche 39', 54'		Adjissa 13'; Bendjaballah 82'	Stadium: Stade du 5 Juillet; Attendance: 24,632; Referee: Belaïd Lacarne

26 November 1982 Round 9	EP Sétif	3–0	ASC Oran	Sétif
	Adjissa 19', 45'; Bendjaballah 63'			Stadium: Stade 8 Mai 1945; Referee: Bouchebehoub

3 December 1982 Round 10	ESM Guelma	1–1	EP Sétif	Guelma
	Boukraa 66'		Khalfa 76'	Referee: Rachid Medjiba

10 December 1982 Round 11	EP Sétif	1–1	CM Belcourt	Sétif
	Khalfa 10'		Dahmani 31'	Stadium: Stade 8 Mai 1945; Referee: Mimoun

24 December 1982 Round 12	ISM Aïn Béïda	1–1	EP Sétif	Aïn Beïda
				Stadium: Stade 24 avril

31 December 1982 Round 13	EP Sétif	0–1	JE Tizi-Ouzou	Sétif
			Aouis 75'	Stadium: Stade 8 Mai 1945; Referee: Bounaga

7 January 1983 Round 14	WO Boufarik	1–0	EP Sétif	Boufarik
	Sahnoun 70'			Stadium: Stade Mohamed Reggaz; Attendance: 6,157; Referee: Tighilt

21 January 1983 Round 15	EP Sétif	1–0	RS Kouba	Sétif
	Adjissa 21'			Stadium: Stade 8 Mai 1945; Referee: Seghiri

28 January 1983 Round 16	EP Sétif	2–0	USK Alger	Sétif
	Saoud 59'; Adjissa 76'			Stadium: Stade 8 Mai 1945; Referee: Amar Ghotari

11 February 1983 Round 17	MP Oran	0–0	EP Sétif	Oran
				Stadium: Ahmed Zabana Stadium; Attendance: 4,862; Referee: Bergui

18 February 1983 Round 18	USM El Harrach	0–0	EP Sétif
				Attendance: 6600; Referee: Rachid Medjiba

11 March 1983 Round 19	EP Sétif	2–1	MA Hussein Dey	Sétif
	Saoud 1', 20'		Ait Hocine 73'	Stadium: Stade 8 Mai 1945; Referee: Dehemchi

18 March 1983 Round 20	ESM Bel-Abbès	0–0	EP Sétif	Sidi Bel Abbes
				Stadium: Stade 24 Fevrier 1956; Referee: Rachid Medjiba

25 March 1983 Round 21	EP Sétif	2–0	GCR Mascara	Sétif
	Khalfa 77', 81'			Stadium: Stade 8 Mai 1945; Referee: Tighilt

8 April 1983 Round 22	WKF Collo	0–1	EP Sétif	Collo
				Stadium: Stade Benjamâa Amar

15 April 1983 Round 23	EP Sétif	5–1	MP Alger	Sétif
	Rouai 20'; Adjissa 25', 44', 71', 75'		Bousri 80'	Stadium: Stade 8 Mai 1945; Referee: Bendjahane

25 April 1983 Round 24	ASC Oran	2–2	EP Sétif	Oran
	Tasfaout 16', 45' (pen.)		Abaouchi 68'; Adjissa 75'	Stadium: Habib Bouakeul Stadium; Referee: Bergui

29 April 1983 Round 25	EP Sétif	0–0	ESM Guelma	Sétif
				Stadium: Stade 8 Mai 1945; Referee: Roumani

27 May 1983 Round 26	CM Belcourt	1–1	EP Sétif	Belouizdad
				Stadium: Stade 20 Août 1955

3 June 1983 Round 27	EP Sétif	2–0	ISM Aïn Béïda	Sétif
	Chaibi 63'; Rais 90'			Stadium: Stade 8 Mai 1945; Referee: Othmane

10 June 1983 Round 28	JE Tizi-Ouzou	1–2	EP Sétif	Tizi Ouzou
				Stadium: Stade 1er Novembre 1954

13 June 1983 Round 29	EP Sétif	3–0	WO Boufarik	Sétif
				Stadium: Stade 8 Mai 1945

17 June 1983 Round 30	RS Kouba	1–0	EP Sétif	Kouba
	Sebbar 51' (pen.)			Stadium: Stade Omar Benhaddad; Attendance: 4000; Referee: Bounaga

== Algerian Cup ==
4 February 1983 Round of 32	AS Khroub	1–2	EP Sétif
Note: Lineup for EP Sétif -

3 March 1983 Round of 16	EP Sétif	3–0	USM Blida
		Report
Note: Lineup for EP Sétif -

1 April 1983 Quarter-finals	USM El Harrach	2–0	EP Sétif	Tizi Ouzou
				Stadium: Stade 1er Novembre 1954
Note: Lineup for EP Sétif -

== Squad information ==
=== Appearances and goals ===
Only 23 games from 30 in National appearances

No.	Pos	Nat	Player	Total		National		Algerian Cup	
No.	Pos	Nat	Player	Apps	Goals	Apps	Goals	Apps	Goals
-	GK	(Algeria) ALG	Bouzidi Cheniti	15	0	15	0	0	0
-	GK	(Algeria) ALG	Antar Osmani	7	0	7	0	0	0
-	GK	(Algeria) ALG	Rahmani	1	0	1	0	0	0
-	DF	(Algeria) ALG	Bachir Abaoui	22	0	21+1	0	0	0
-	DF	(Algeria) ALG	Kamel Adjas	8	0	7+1	0	0	0
-	DF	(Algeria) ALG	Ammar Bernaoui	6	0	6	0	0	0
-	DF	(Algeria) ALG	Ahmed chadli	19	0	19	0	0	0
-	DF	(Algeria) ALG	Boualem Khalfi	14	0	13+1	0	0	0
-	DF	(Algeria) ALG	Djamel Nebti	10	0	10	0	0	0
-	DF	(Algeria) ALG	Abdelhakim Serrar	18	0	16+2	0	0	0
-	DF	(Algeria) ALG	Tribeche	3	0	3	0	0	0
-	MF	(Algeria) ALG	Abouchi	6	0	3+3	0	0	0
-	MF	(Algeria) ALG	El Ayachi Arabat	21	0	21	0	0	0
-	MF	(Algeria) ALG	Djamel Chaibi	21	0	21	0	0	0
-	MF	(Algeria) ALG	Mustapha Gharib	17	0	9+8	0	0	0
-	MF	(Algeria) ALG	Chawki Raïs	11	0	10+1	0	0	0
-	MF	(Algeria) ALG	Rouai	4	0	4	0	0	0
-	MF	(Algeria) ALG	Azzal	2	0	2	0	0	0
-	FW	(Algeria) ALG	Nacer Adjissa	19	0	18+1	0	0	0
-	FW	(Algeria) ALG	Ayat	3	0	3	0	0	0
-	FW	(Algeria) ALG	Derradji Bendjaballah	21	0	17+4	0	0	0
-	FW	(Algeria) ALG	Abdelkrim Khalfa	17	0	15+2	0	0	0
-	FW	(Algeria) ALG	Osmani	1	0	1	0	0	0
-	FW	(Algeria) ALG	Hocine Saoud	18	0	12+6	0	0	0

Last updated: 1 May 2017
Source: Competitions

=== Goalscorers ===
Includes all competitive matches. The list is sorted alphabetically by surname when total goals are equal.

No.	Nat.	Player	Pos.	N 1	AC	TOTAL
?	(Algeria)	Nacer Adjissa	FW	12	?	?
?	(Algeria)	Derradji Bendjaballah	FW	2	?	?
?	(Algeria)	Abdelkrim Khalfa	FW	6	?	?
?	(Algeria)	El Ayachi Arabat	MF	1	?	?
?	(Algeria)	Hocine Saoud	FW	3	?	?
?	(Algeria)	Rouai	MF	1	?	?
?	(Algeria)	Abouchi	MF	1	?	?
?	(Algeria)	Djamel Chaibi	MF	1	?	?
?	(Algeria)	Rais	FW	1	?	?
Own Goals				0	0	0
Totals				28+12	5	45
