= 1988–89 ES Sétif season =

ES Sétif
1988–89 season
- Head coach: Mokhtar Arribi
- Stadium: Stade 8 Mai 1945
- Division 2: 1st
- Algerian Cup: Winners
- Cup of Champions Clubs: Winners
- Top goalscorer: League: Abderrahim Bendjaballah (15 goals); All: Abderrahim Bendjaballah (20 goals)

In the 1988–89 season, ES Sétif is competing in the Division 2 for the first time. They competing in Division 2, the Algerian Cup and the Cup of Champions Clubs. ES Sétif changed the name to EP Sétif from 1977 to 1987 and to Entente de Sétif from 1987–88 to 1988–89 seasons, so the club participated under the first name until the quarter-final and under the second name in the semi-final and the final.

== Review ==
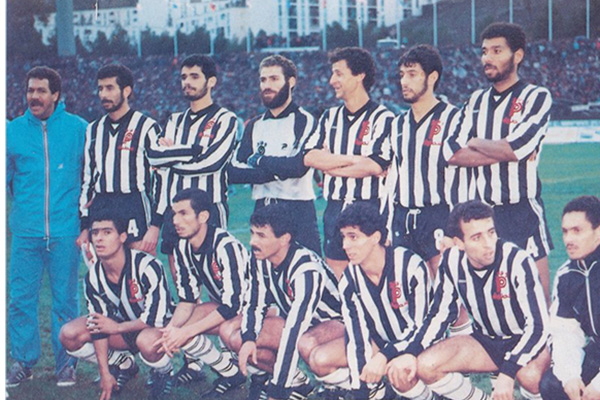
ES Sétif 1989–90 with From Left to Right: Stand Up : Serrar - Boulehdjilet - Osmani - Nabti - Zorgane - Bernaoui. Sitting Bendjabellah - Rahmani - Adjissa - Gharib - Adjas. This team participated in the 1988 African Cup of Champions Clubs.

ES Sétif participates in the African Cup of Champions Clubs, they play in the quarter-finals against the Gabonese club FC 105 Libreville, they lose in Libreville (3–1), but achieve a historic comeback at home 3–0. In the semi-final, they faced the Egyptians of Al Ahly SC, at home the black eagles won 2–0, but on the second leg in Cairo, they lost by the same score, however after the penalty shootout they qualify for the final against the Nigerian club Iwuanyanwu Nationale. This was the first time in the history of African football that a second-tier team had for the first time reached a final. ES Sétif plays under the leadership of the godfather of Setif football and the former glory of the National Liberation Front team Mokhtar Arribi.

In the first leg on November 26, 1988, they lost 1–0, in the second leg on December 9, 1988, it was a snowy day, and the road leading to Constantine's Stade 17 Juin was closed, Les Aigles Noirs will experience the first continental coronation after the 4–0 victory with a goal from Zorgane, two minutes later from Abderrazak Rahmani, Andrew Uwe scored against his own goal in the 85th, then Abderrahim Bendjaballah score the fourth goal in the 87th. ESS has become the third Algerian club to win the African Cup of Champions Clubs after MC Alger in 1976 and JS Kabylie in 1981.

== Squad list ==
Players and squad numbers last updated on 1 September 1988.
Note: Flags indicate national team as has been defined under FIFA eligibility rules. Players may hold more than one non-FIFA nationality.

| Nat. | Name | Position | Date of Birth (Age) | Signed from |
|---|---|---|---|---|
| (Algeria) | Abdelhakim Serrar | CB | 24 April 1961 (aged 27) | |
| (Algeria) | Antar Osmani | GK | 22 February 1960 (aged 28) | Reserve team |
| (Algeria) | Malik Zorgane | MF | 27 June 1965 (aged 23) | Reserve team |
| (Algeria) | Kamel Adjas | LB | 3 January 1963 (aged 25) | Reserve team |
| (Algeria) | Djamel Nabti | DF | | |
| (Algeria) | Ammar Bernaoui | DF | | |
| (Algeria) | Dhia Eddine Djihad Boulahdjilet | MF | | |
| (Algeria) | Chawki Raïs | FW | | |
| (Algeria) | Abderrazak Rahmani | FW | 14 December 1960 (aged 27) | |
| (Algeria) | Nacer Adjissa | MF | 31 March 1957 (aged 31) | USM Sétif |
| (Algeria) | Ammar Doudou | FW | | |
| (Algeria) | Fayçal Kessai | GK | | |
| (Algeria) | Derradji Bendjaballah | ST | 23 November 1959 (aged 28) | Reserve team |
| (Algeria) | Abderrahim Bendjaballah | ST | 13 April 1965 (aged 23) | Reserve team |
| (Algeria) | Hamid Rahmouni | ST | 22 October 1967 (aged 20) | Reserve team |
| (Algeria) | Mustapha Gharib | FW | | |
| (Algeria) | Salah Bourahla | FW | | |

== Competitions ==
=== Overview ===
| Competition | Record | | | | | | | | Started round | Final position / round | First match | Last match |
| Competition | G | W | D | L | GF | GA | GD | Win % | Started round | Final position / round | First match | Last match |
|---|---|---|---|---|---|---|---|---|---|---|---|---|
| Division 2 | 32 | 17 | 11 | 4 | 58 | 23 | +35 | 53.13 | —N/a | 1st | 30 September 1988 | 16 June 1989 |
| Algerian Cup | 6 | 5 | 1 | 0 | 16 | 4 | +12 | 83.33 | Round of 64 | Winners | 12 January 1989 | 5 July 1989 |
| Cup of Champions Clubs | 6 | 3 | 0 | 3 | 10 | 6 | +4 | 50.00 | Quarter-finals | Winners | 11 September 1988 | 9 December 1988 |
| Total | 44 | 25 | 12 | 7 | 84 | 33 | +51 | 56.82 | | | | |

=== Division 2 ===
==== League table ====
| Pos | Team | Pld | W | D | L | GF | GA | GD | Pts | Qualification or relegation |
|---|---|---|---|---|---|---|---|---|---|---|
| 1 | ES Sétif | 32 | 18 | 10 | 4 | 58 | 23 | +35 | 46 | Promotion to Division 1 |
| 2 | CR Belcourt | 32 | 17 | 10 | 5 | 38 | 16 | +22 | 44 | Promotion to Division 1 |
| 3 | WA Tlemcen | 32 | 16 | 8 | 8 | 40 | 23 | +17 | 40 | |
| 4 | USM Blida | 32 | 15 | 8 | 9 | 38 | 30 | +8 | 38 | |
| 5 | JSM Skikda | 32 | 12 | 14 | 6 | 35 | 26 | +9 | 38 | |
| 6 | GC Mascara | 32 | 14 | 6 | 12 | 40 | 32 | +8 | 34 | |
| 7 | MB Batna | 32 | 13 | 7 | 12 | 41 | 30 | +11 | 33 | |
| 8 | Olympique de Médéa | 32 | 12 | 9 | 11 | 35 | 34 | +1 | 33 | |
| 9 | Olympic Chlef | 32 | 11 | 10 | 11 | 25 | 23 | +2 | 32 | |
| 10 | CS Constantine | 32 | 14 | 3 | 15 | 44 | 44 | 0 | 31 | |
| 11 | CR Témouchent | 32 | 11 | 8 | 13 | 26 | 31 | −5 | 30 | |
| 12 | ES Guelma | 32 | 10 | 10 | 12 | 30 | 33 | −3 | 30 | |
| 13 | IRB El Hadjar | 32 | 11 | 7 | 14 | 28 | 37 | −9 | 29 | |
| 14 | E Sour El Ghozlane | 32 | 9 | 11 | 12 | 29 | 32 | −3 | 29 | Relegation to Régional D3 |
| 15 | RCB Oued Rhiou | 32 | 9 | 8 | 15 | 33 | 57 | −24 | 26 | Relegation to Régional D3 |
| 16 | JS El Biar | 32 | 5 | 13 | 14 | 17 | 34 | −17 | 23 | Relegation to Régional D3 |
| 17 | CRB Mecheria | 32 | 1 | 7 | 24 | 20 | 74 | −54 | 8 (Note: CRB Mecheria were deducted 1 point.) | Relegation to Régional D3 |

Updated to match(es) played on unknown. Source:
Rules for classification: 1) points; 2) head-to-head points; 3) head-to-head goal difference; 4) goal difference; 5) total goals; 6) fairplay ranking; 7) playoff.

==== Results by round ====
| Round | 1 | 2 | 3 | 4 | 5 | 6 | 7 | 8 | 9 | 10 | 11 | 12 | 13 | 14 | 15 | 16 | 17 | 18 | 19 | 20 | 21 | 22 | 23 | 24 | 25 | 26 | 27 | 28 | 29 | 30 | 31 | 32 | 33 | 34 |
|---|---|---|---|---|---|---|---|---|---|---|---|---|---|---|---|---|---|---|---|---|---|---|---|---|---|---|---|---|---|---|---|---|---|---|
| Ground | H | A | H | A | H | A | | A | H | A | H | A | H | A | H | A | H | A | H | A | H | A | H | | H | A | H | A | H | A | H | A | H | A |
| Result | W | W | W | L | W | D | | D | W | L | W | D | W | W | D | D | W | D | W | D | D | L | W | | W | W | W | D | W | L | W | D | W | D |
| Position | | | | | | | | | | | | | | | | | | | | | | | | | | | | | | | | | 1 | 1 |

Source: Competitive matches
A = Away; H = Home; W = Win; D = Draw; L = Loss

=== Matches ===
| 17 October 1988 (Note: Match originally scheduled on September 23, 1988 (1st round of the 1988-89 season), awarded due to participation of EP Sétif in the second leg of the quarter-finals of the African Cup of Champions Clubs against FC 105 Libreville.) Round 1 | ES Sétif | 3–1 | IRB El Hadjar | Sétif |
| : | A.Bendjaballah; Rahmani; Rahmouni | | | Stadium: Stade 8 Mai 1945 |
Note: Lineup for ES Sétif -

| 30 September 1988 Round 2 | CRB Mecheria | 1–2 | ES Sétif | Mécheria |
| 15:00 | Atba 50' | Report | A.Bendjaballah 7'; Gharib 70' |
Note: Lineup for ES Sétif -

| 14 November 1988 (Note: Match originally scheduled on October 21, 1988 (3st round of the 1988-89 season), awarded due to participation of ES Sétif in the first leg of the semi-finals of the African Cup of Champions Clubs against Al Ahly SC.) Round 3 | ES Sétif | 5–0 | USM Blida | Sétif |
| : | | Report | | Stadium: Stade 8 Mai 1945 |
Note: Lineup for ES Sétif -

| 28 October 1988 Round 4 | JS El Biar | 2–1 | ES Sétif | El Biar |
| : | Khedali 15', 51' | Report | Bendjabalah 60' |
Note: Lineup for ES Sétif -

| 9 January 1989 (Note: Match originally scheduled on November 4, 1988 (5th round of the 1988-89 season), awarded due to participation of ES Sétif in the second leg of the semi-finals of the African Cup of Champions Clubs against Al Ahly SC.) Round 5 | ES Sétif | 2–1 | MB Batna | Sétif |
| : | | Report | | Stadium: Stade 8 Mai 1945 |
Note: Lineup for ES Sétif -

| 16 January 1989 (Note: Match originally scheduled on November 11, 1988 (6th round of the 1988-89 season), awarded due to participation of ES Sétif in the second leg of the semi-finals of the African Cup of Champions Clubs against Al Ahly SC.) Round 6 | WA Tlemcen | 1–1 | ES Sétif | Tlemcen |
| : | Djemai 10' | Report | A.Bendjaballah 73' | Stadium: Colonel Lotfi Stadium |
Note: Lineup for ES Sétif -

| Round 8 | Olympic Chlef | 1–1 | ES Sétif | Chlef |
| : | | Report | | Stadium: Mâamar Sahli Stadium |
Note: Lineup for ES Sétif -

| Round 9 | ES Sétif | 3–1 | CS Constantine | Sétif |
| : | | Report | | Stadium: Stade 8 Mai 1945 |
Note: Lineup for ES Sétif -

| 27 February 1989 (Note: Match originally scheduled on December 9, 1988 (10th round of the 1988-89 season), awarded due to participation of ES Sétif in the second leg of the final of the African Cup of Champions Clubs against Iwuanyanwu Nationale.) Round 10 | JSM Skikda | 1–0 | ES Sétif | Skikda |
| : | Djamel Guerili | | | Stadium: Stade 20 Août 1955 |
Note: Lineup for ES Sétif -

| 16 December 1988 Round 11 | ES Sétif | 2–1 | E Sour El Ghozlane | Sétif |
| : | D.Bendjaballah 19'; Doudou 46' | Report | Touati 48' | Stadium: Stade 8 Mai 1945 |
Note: Lineup for ES Sétif -

| 6 March 1989 (Note: Match originally scheduled on December 23, 1988 (12th round of the 1988-89 season), awarded.) Round 12 | CR Belcourt | 1–1 | ES Sétif | Belouizdad, Algiers |
| : | | | | Stadium: Stade 20 Août 1955 |
Note: Lineup for ES Sétif -

| 10 April 1989 (Note: Match originally scheduled on December 29, 1988 (13th round of the 1988-89 season), awarded.) Round 13 | ES Sétif | 3–1 | ES Guelma | Sétif |
| : | | | | Stadium: Stade 8 Mai 1945 |
Note: Lineup for ES Sétif -

| 1 May 1989 (Note: Match originally scheduled on January 1, 1989 (14th round of the 1988-89 season), awarded.) Round 14 | RCB Oued Rhiou | 0–5 | ES Sétif |
| : |
Note: Lineup for ES Sétif -

| 6 January 1989 Round 15 | ES Sétif | 0–0 | GC Mascara | Sétif |
| : | | Report | | Stadium: Stade 8 Mai 1945 |
Note: Lineup for ES Sétif -

| 20 January 1989 Round 16 | Olympique de Médéa | 0–0 | ES Sétif | Blida |
| : | | Report | | Stadium: Brakni Brothers Stadium |
Note: Lineup for ES Sétif -

| 27 January 1989 Round 17 | ES Sétif | 2–1 | CR Témouchent | Sétif |
| : | Rahmani 47'; Adjissa 54' (pen.) | Report | Ben Mestoura 73' | Stadium: Stade 8 Mai 1945 |
Note: Lineup for ES Sétif -

| 3 February 1989 Round 18 | IRB El Hadjar | 1–1 | ES Sétif | El Hadjar |
| : | Benkhedim 51' | Report | A.Bendjaballah 67' |
Note: Lineup for ES Sétif -

| 10 February 1989 Round 19 | ES Sétif | 3–0 | CRB Mecheria | Sétif |
| : | Rahmouni 30'; Bendjabalah 37'; Rahmouni 78' | Report | | Stadium: Stade 8 Mai 1945 |
Note: Lineup for ES Sétif -

| 17 February 1989 Round 20 | USM Blida | 0–0 | ES Sétif | Blida |
| : | | Report | | Stadium: Brakni Brothers Stadium |
Note: Lineup for ES Sétif -

| 3 March 1989 Round 21 | ES Sétif | 1–1 | JS El Biar | Sétif |
| : | Zorgane 5' | Report | | Stadium: Stade 8 Mai 1945 |
Note: Lineup for ES Sétif -

| 10 March 1989 Round 22 | MB Batna | 4–0 | ES Sétif |
| : | | Report |
Note: Lineup for ES Sétif -

| 22 May 1989 (Note: Match originally scheduled on March 17, 1989 (23rd round of the 1988-89 season), awarded.) Round 23 | ES Sétif | 2–1 | WA Tlemcen | Sétif |
| : | Chadhli 43'; Rahmani (?) | | Gueddim 30' | Stadium: Stade 8 Mai 1945 |
Note: Lineup for ES Sétif -

| 5 June 1989 (Note: Match originally scheduled on March 31, 1989 (25th round of the 1988-89 season), awarded.) Round 25 | ES Sétif | 3–0 (Note: Match stopped in the 15th minute following the numerical inferiority of Olympic Chlef players on the field (Seven players). ES Sétif awarded 3–0 win.) | Olympic Chlef | Sétif |
| : | Rahmouni 14' | | | Stadium: Stade 8 Mai 1945 |
Note: Lineup for ES Sétif -

| 14 April 1989 Round 26 | CS Constantine | 0–3 (Note: Match stopped in the 84th minute following violence committed by CS Constantine players. ES Sétif awarded 3–0 win.) | ES Sétif | Constantine |
| : | Echeikh 57' (pen.) | Report | Adjissa 75' | Stadium: 17 June Stadium |
Note: Lineup for ES Sétif -

| 28 April 1989 Round 27 | ES Sétif | 2–1 | JSM Skikda | Sétif |
| : | D.Bendjaballah 45'; Merzoug 57' (o.g.) | Report | Medjbouri 84' | Stadium: Stade 8 Mai 1945 |
Note: Lineup for ES Sétif -

| 5 May 1989 Round 28 | E Sour El Ghozlane | 0–0 | ES Sétif | Sour El-Ghozlane |
| : | | Report |
Note: Lineup for ES Sétif -

| 12 May 1989 Round 29 | ES Sétif | 1–0 | CR Belcourt | Sétif |
| : | Serrar 30' (pen.) | Report | | Stadium: Stade 8 Mai 1945 |
Note: Lineup for ES Sétif -

| 19 May 1989 Round 30 | ES Guelma | 1–0 | ES Sétif | Guelma |
| : | Sellaoui 90' | Report | | Stadium: Boudjemaa Souidani Stadium |
Note: Lineup for ES Sétif -

| 26 May 1989 Round 31 | ES Sétif | 5–0 | RCB Oued Rhiou | Sétif |
| : | A.Bendjaballah 3', 66', 88'; Guennoun 15' (o.g.); Rahmani 72' | Report | | Stadium: Stade 8 Mai 1945 |
Note: Lineup for ES Sétif -

| 2 June 1989 Round 32 | GCM Mascara | 1–1 | ES Sétif | Mascara |
| : | Hebali 48' | Report | Rais 34' | Stadium: Stade de l'Unité Africaine |
Note: Lineup for ES Sétif -

| 9 June 1989 Round 33 | ES Sétif | 5–1 | Olympique de Médéa | Sétif |
| : | Rais 14'; Rahmouni 52', 75'; Rahmani 66'; Gharib 83' | Report | Abdessamia 64' | Stadium: Stade 8 Mai 1945 |
Note: Lineup for ES Sétif -

| 16 June 1989 Round 34 | CRB Témouchent | 0–0 | ES Sétif |
| : | | Report |
Note: Lineup for ES Sétif -

=== Algerian Cup ===
| 12 January 1989 Round of 64 | EP Sétif | 4–0 | AB Barika | Annaba |
| 14:30 | Gharib 27'; A.Bendjaballah 43', 45', 73' | Report | | Stadium: 19 May 1956 Stadium |

| 24 February 1989 Round of 32 | EP Sétif | 3–3 (a.e.t.) (3–2 p) | USM Blida | Oran |
| : | Zorgane 8'; Gharib 40'; D.Bendjaballah 51' | | Kamel Zane 56'; Douadi 25'; Yahi 53' | Stadium: Habib Bouakeul Stadium |

| 6 April 1989 Round of 16 | ASO Chlef | 0–2 | EP Sétif | Algiers |
| 14:00 | | | Adjissa 53'; Ammar Doudou 83' | Stadium: Stade du 5 Juillet |

| 1 May 1989 Quarter-finals | USM Bel Abbès | 0–3 | EP Sétif | Algiers |
| : | | | Rahmouni 61', 70'; D.Bendjaballah 90' | Stadium: Stade du 5 Juillet |

| 25 June 1989 Semi-finals | EP Sétif | 3–1 | MP Oran | Algiers |
| 16:00 | A.Bendjaballah 2'; D.Bendjaballah 42'; Ouanes Mechkour 62' (o.g.) | | Meziane 29' | Stadium: Stade du 5 Juillet |

| 5 July 1989 Final | EP Sétif | 1–0 | MSP Batna | Algiers |
| 17:00 | Gharib 86' | Report | | Stadium: Stade du 5 Juillet; Attendance: 9,410; Referee: Abderrahmane Bergui; Assistant referees: Mimoun, Sendid; Fourth official: Zoubir Kaddouri |
Note: Lineup for EP Sétif - Antar Osmani, Djamel Nabti, Amar Bernaoui, Abdelhakim Serar, Senoussi, Rahmani, Abderahim bendjaballah, Derradji Bendjaballah (substituted off) 90' (Ahmed chadli, (substituted on) 90'), Malik Zorgane, Embarek Saci Mattem, Adjissa (substituted off) 83' (Mustapha Gharib, (substituted on) 83'). - Coach: Bouzid Cheniti

=== African Cup of Champions Clubs ===
==== Quarter-finals ====
| 11 September 1988 first leg | FC 105 Libreville (Gabon) | 3–1 | (Algeria) EP Sétif | Libreville, Gabon |
| 16:00 UTC+1 | Al-Hassan 40'; Quarshie 72'; Manon 89' (pen.) | Report | Abderrahim Bendjaballah 32' | Referee: Abovi (Ghana) |
Note: Lineup for EP Sétif - Osmani, Bouzid Raïs, Nabti, Bernaoui, Serrar (Bourahlia), Boulahdjilet, Rahmani, Adjissa, Bendjaballah, Gharib (Doudou), Rahmouni

| 23 September 1988 Second leg | EP Sétif (Algeria) | 3–0 | (Gabon) FC 105 Libreville | Sétif, Algeria |
| | Rahmouni 9'; Zorgane 37'; Gharib 57' | Report | | Stadium: 8 May 1945 Stadium; Referee: Saré Idrissa (Mauritania) |
Note: Lineup for EP Sétif - Osmani, Nabti, Adjas, Bernaoui, Serrar, Boulahdjilet, Gharib (Bendjaballah.D), Zorgane, Rahmani, Adjissa, Rahmouni

==== Semi-finals ====
| 23 October 1988 first leg | EP Sétif (Algeria) | 2–0 | (Egypt) Al Ahly SC | Sétif, Algeria |
| 19:00 UTC+1 | Rahmouni 14'; Gharib 78' | Report | | Stadium: 8 May 1945 Stadium; Referee: Karim Camara (Guinea) |
Note: Lineup for EP Sétif - Osmani, Djamal Nabti, Adjas, Bernaoui, Serrar, Boulahdjilet, Bendjaballah.A, Bouzid Raïs, Rahmani (Gharib), Adjissa, Rahmouni (Bendjaballah.D).

| 6 November 1988 Second leg | Al Ahly SC (Egypt) | 2–0 (2–4 p) | (Algeria) EP Sétif | Nasr City, Cairo |
| 18:00 UTC+2 | Alaa Mayhoub 48' (pen.); Rabie Yassin 52' | Report | | Stadium: Nasser Stadium; Referee: Idrissa Sarr (Mauritania) |
Note: Lineup for EP Sétif - Osmani, Nabti, Adjas, Bernaoui, Serrar; Boulahdjilaet, Zorgane, Adjissa, Derradji Bendjaballah (Rais), Rahmani, Doudou.

==== Final ====
| 26 November 1988 first leg | Iwuanyanwu Nationale (Nigeria) | 1–0 | (Algeria) Entente de Sétif | Ibadan |
| 16:00 UTC+1 | Ozogula 29' | Report | | Stadium: Liberty Stadium; Referee: Idrissa Traoré (Mali) |
Note: Lineup for EP Sétif - Osmani, Nabti, Adjas, Bernaoui, Serrar (c), Boulehdjilet, Bouzid Raïs (substituted off) 71' (Bendjaballah D. (substituted on) 71'), Zorgane, Rahmani Adjissa, Doudou (substituted off) 46' (Bendjaballah A., (substituted on) 46'). - Coach: Mokhtar Aribi

| 9 December 1988 Second leg | Entente de Sétif (Algeria) | 4–0 | (Nigeria) Iwuanyanwu Nationale | Constantine |
| 16:00 UTC+1 | Zorgane 50'; A.Rahmani 52'; Uwe 85' (o.g.); A.Bendjaballah 87' | Report | | Stadium: Stade 17 Juin; Referee: Badara Sène (Senegal) |
Note: Lineup for EP Sétif - Osmani, Nabti, Adjas, Bernaoui, Serrar (c), Boulehdjilet (substituted off) 46' (Doudou, (substituted on) 46'), Gharib, Zorgane (substituted off) 72' (Bouzid Raïs, (substituted on) 72'), Bendjaballah A., Adjissa, Rahmani. - Coach: Mokhtar Aribi

== Squad information ==
=== Playing statistics ===
| Pos | Player | Nat | Division 2 | | | Algerian Cup | | | African Cup of Champions Clubs | | | Total | | |
| Pos | Player | Nat | App | St | G | App | St | G | App | St | G | App | St | G |
|---|---|---|---|---|---|---|---|---|---|---|---|---|---|---|
Goalkeepers
| GK | Fayçal Kessai | (Algeria) | 0 | 0 | 0 | 0 | 0 | 0 | 0 | 0 | 0 | 0 | 0 | 0 |
| GK | Antar Osmani | (Algeria) | 0 | 0 | 0 | 1 | 1 | 0 | 5 | 5 | 0 | 0 | 0 | 0 |
Defenders
| DF | Abdelhakim Serrar | (Algeria) | 0 | 0 | 0 | 1 | 1 | 0 | 5 | 5 | 0 | 0 | 0 | 0 |
| DF | Kamel Adjas | (Algeria) | 0 | 0 | 0 | 0 | 0 | 0 | 5 | 5 | 0 | 0 | 0 | 0 |
| DF | Djamel Nabti | (Algeria) | 0 | 0 | 0 | 1 | 1 | 0 | 5 | 5 | 0 | 0 | 0 | 0 |
| DF | Ammar Bernaoui | (Algeria) | 0 | 0 | 0 | 1 | 1 | 0 | 5 | 5 | 0 | 0 | 0 | 0 |
| DF | Bouzid Raïs | (Algeria) | 0 | 0 | 0 | 0 | 0 | 0 | 4 | 2 | 0 | 0 | 0 | 0 |
| DF | Senoussi | (Algeria) | 0 | 0 | 0 | 1 | 1 | 0 | 0 | 0 | 0 | 0 | 0 | 0 |
Midfielders
| MF | Malik Zorgane | (Algeria) | 0 | 0 | 0 | 1 | 1 | 0 | 4 | 4 | 2 | 0 | 0 | 0 |
| MF | Dhia Eddine Djihad Boulahdjilet | (Algeria) | 0 | 0 | 0 | 0 | 0 | 0 | 5 | 5 | 0 | 0 | 0 | 0 |
| MF | Nacer Adjissa | (Algeria) | 0 | 0 | 0 | 1 | 1 | 0 | 5 | 5 | 0 | 0 | 0 | 0 |
| MF | Embarek Saci Mattem | (Algeria) | 0 | 0 | 0 | 1 | 1 | 0 | 0 | 0 | 0 | 0 | 0 | 0 |
| MF | Ahmed chadli | (Algeria) | 0 | 0 | 0 | 1 | 0 | 0 | 0 | 0 | 0 | 0 | 0 | 0 |
Forwards
| FW | Chawki Raïs | (Algeria) | 0 | 0 | 0 | 0 | 0 | 0 | 0 | 0 | 0 | 0 | 0 | 0 |
| FW | Abderrazak Rahmani | (Algeria) | 0 | 0 | 0 | 1 | 1 | 0 | 5 | 5 | 1 | 0 | 0 | 0 |
| FW | Ammar Doudou | (Algeria) | 0 | 0 | 0 | 0 | 0 | 0 | 3 | 2 | 0 | 0 | 0 | 0 |
| FW | Derradji Bendjaballah | (Algeria) | 0 | 0 | 0 | 1 | 1 | 0 | 4 | 1 | 0 | 0 | 0 | 0 |
| FW | Abderrahim Bendjaballah | (Algeria) | 0 | 0 | 0 | 1 | 1 | 0 | 3 | 2 | 2 | 0 | 0 | 0 |
| FW | Hamid Rahmouni | (Algeria) | 0 | 0 | 0 | 0 | 0 | 0 | 2 | 2 | 2 | 0 | 0 | 0 |
| FW | Mustapha Gharib | (Algeria) | 0 | 0 | 0 | 1 | 0 | 1 | 3 | 2 | 2 | 0 | 0 | 0 |
| FW | Salah Bourahla | (Algeria) | 0 | 0 | 0 | 0 | 0 | 0 | 0 | 0 | 0 | 0 | 0 | 0 |
| Total | | | 32 | | 58 | 6 | | 16 | 6 | | 10 | 44 | | 84 |

=== Goalscorers ===
Includes all competitive matches. The list is sorted alphabetically by surname when total goals are equal.

| Nat. | Player | Pos. | D2 | AC | CL1 | TOTAL |
|---|---|---|---|---|---|---|
| (Algeria) | Abderrahim Bendjaballah | FW | 15 | 4 | 2 | 21 |
| (Algeria) | Hamid Rahmouni | FW | 7 | 2 | 2 | 9 |
| (Algeria) | Mustapha Gharib | FW | 4 | 3 | 2 | 9 |
| (Algeria) | Abderrazak Rahmani | | 6 | 0 | 1 | 7 |
| (Algeria) | Nacer Adjissa | MF | 4 | 1 | 0 | 5 |
| (Algeria) | Derradji Bendjaballah | FW | 0 | 3 | 0 | 3 |
| (Algeria) | Malik Zorgane | MF | 0 | 1 | 2 | 3 |
| (Algeria) | Ammar Doudou | FW | 0 | 1 | 0 | 1 |
| (Algeria) | | | 0 | 0 | 0 | 0 |
| Own Goals | | | 0 | 1 | 1 | 2 |
| Totals | | | 58 | 16 | 10 | 84 |
