= List of foreign Ligue 1 players: S =

This is a list of foreign players in the French Ligue 1, which commenced play in 1932. The following players must meet both of the following two criteria:

1. Have played at least one Ligue 1 game. Players who were signed by Ligue 1 clubs, but only played in lower league, cup and/or European games, or did not play in any competitive games at all, are not included.
2. Are considered foreign, i.e., outside France and its dependencies (Guadeloupe, Martinique, Reunion Island or French Polynesia), determined by the following:

A player is considered foreign if he is not eligible to play for the national teams of France.

More specifically,

- If a player has been capped on international level, the national team is used; if he has been capped by more than one country, the highest level (or the most recent) team is used. These include French players with dual citizenship. Players who played for France but came as foreign players (such as Miguel Ángel Lauri) are also listed.
- If a player has not been capped on international level, his country of birth is used, except those who were born abroad from French parents or moved to France at a young age, and those who clearly indicated to have switched his nationality to another nation.

Clubs listed are those that the player has played at least one Ligue 1 game for.

Seasons listed are those that the player has played at least one Ligue 1 game in. Note that seasons, not calendar years, are used. For example, "1992–95" indicates that the player has played in every season from 1992–93 to 1994–95, but not necessarily every calendar year from 1992 to 1995.

In bold: players still active in Ligue 1 and their respective teams in current season.

== Saudi Arabia ==
- **Saud Abdulhamid** – **Lens** – 2025–

== Scotland ==
- Seton Airlie – Cannes – 1947–48
- William Aitken – Cannes, Antibes – 1932–34, 1937–39
- Robert Allison – RC Roubaix – 1936–39
- John Baker Muir – Excelsior Roubaix – 1933–35
- Eric Black – Metz – 1986–91
- John Blane – Cannes – 1947–48
- Alec Cheyne – SC Nîmes – 1932–34
- John Collins – AS Monaco – 1996–98
- Siriki Dembélé – Auxerre – 2022–23
- John Donoghue – Excelsior Roubaix – 1932–35
- Peter Dougall – Sète – 1932–33
- Willie Dowall – Red Star – 1937–38
- Thomas Dunsmore – Sète – 1946–47
- Edward Edmunds – Red Star – 1932–33
- Steven Fletcher – Marseille – 2015–16
- Jamie Fullarton – Bastia – 1996–97
- Fraser Hornby – Reims – 2020–22
- Allan Hutton – Cannes – 1947–48
- Allan Johnston – Rennes – 1996–97
- Mo Johnston – Nantes – 1987–89
- James Keenan – Red Star – 1937–38
- Jeremiah Kelly – Rennes – 1933–34
- John MacGowan – Olympique Lillois – 1932–34
- Malcom MacLaren – Cannes – 1947–48
- Alexander MacLennan – Excelsior Roubaix – 1934–37
- Phillip McCloy – Rennes – 1933–34
- Derek McInnes – Toulouse – 1999–2000
- George Mills – Cannes – 1933–34
- Bill Murray – RC Roubaix – 1937–38
- George Nicol – RC Roubaix – 1935–37
- Denis O'Hare – CA Paris – 1932–34
- Harold O'Neill – Red Star – 1935–36
- Thomas Francis Pritchard – Marseille – 1932–33
- John Renwick – Excelsior Roubaix – 1935–36
- Alexander Patterson Sherry – Marseille – 1932–33
- Gary Smith – Rennes – 1996–97
- George Alexander Smoker – Alès – 1932–33, 1934–36
- Ray Stephen – AS Nancy – 1986–87, 1990–91
- Ian Wallace – Brest – 1984–85
- Andrew Wilson – SC Nîmes – 1932–34

== Senegal ==
=== B ===
- Abasse Ba – Le Havre – 2008–09
- Issa Ba – Auxerre – 2006–09
- Khalifa Ba – Marseille – 2003–04
- Youssouph Badji – Brest – 2021–22
- Keita Baldé – Monaco – 2017–18, 2019–20
- Fodé Ballo-Touré – Lille, Monaco, Le Havre, Metz – 2017–21, 2024–26
- Rahmane Barry – Marseille, Lorient – 2003–05, 2006–07
- Moustapha Bayal Sall – Saint-Étienne, Nancy – 2006–16
- Habib Beye – Strasbourg, Marseille – 1998–2001, 2002–07
- Jules Bocandé – Metz, Paris SG, Nice, Lens – 1984–92
- Sarr Boubacar – Marseille, Paris SG – 1975–76, 1977–83, 1984–86

=== C ===
- Alcaly Camara – Sedan – 2002–03
- François Camara – Nîmes Olympique – 1968–69
- Henri Camara – Sedan – 2001–03
- **Lamine Camara** – Metz, **Monaco** – 2023–
- Souleymane Camara – Laval, Reims – 1975–79
- Souleymane Camara – Monaco, Guingamp, Nice, Montpellier – 2001–07, 2009–20
- Saliou Ciss – Valenciennes, Angers – 2013–14, 2017–18
- Adama Cissé – Lille – 1994–95
- Aliou Cissé – Lille, Paris SG, Montpellier, Sedan – 1994–95, 1999–2002, 2006–07
- Pape Abou Cissé – Saint-Étienne – 2020–21
- Papiss Cissé – Metz – 2007–08
- Issa Cissokho – Nantes, Angers, Amiens – 2013–15, 2016–18
- Ferdinand Coly – Châteauroux, Lens – 1997–98, 1999–2002
- Racine Coly – Nice – 2017–21
- Abdoulaye Coulibaly – Saint-Étienne – 2008–09

=== D ===
- Omar Daf – Sochaux, Brest – 1998–99, 2001–09, 2010–13
- **Boulaye Dia** – Reims, **Rennes** – 2018–21, 2026–
- Issiar Dia – AS Nancy, Gazélec Ajaccio – 2006–10, 2015–17
- Lamine Diack – Nantes – 2023–24
- Fallou Diagne – Rennes, Metz – 2014–18
- Modou Diagne – AS Nancy – 2016–17
- Pape Diakhaté – AS Nancy, Saint-Étienne, Lyon – 2005–07, 2009–11
- Mamadou Diakhon – Reims – 2022–25
- Abdou Diallo – Monaco, Paris SG – 2014–15, 2016–17, 2019–22
- Abdoulaye Diallo – Marseille – 1984–90
- Abdoulaye Diallo – Rennes – 2009–10, 2011–12, 2015–16, 2017–19
- Baïla Diallo – Clermont – 2022–23
- **Habib Diallo** – Metz, Strasbourg, **Le Mans** – 2016–18, 2019–23, 2025–
- Lamana Diallo – Sochaux – 2013–14
- Moustapha Diallo – Guingamp, Nîmes – 2013–19
- Papa Amadou Diallo – Metz – 2023–24
- Zakaria Diallo – Dijon, Lens – 2011–12, 2020–21
- Salif Diao – Monaco, Sedan – 1998–99, 2000–2002
- Habib Diarra – Strasbourg – 2021–25
- Krépin Diatta – Monaco – 2020–26
- Lamine Diatta – Toulouse, Rennes, Lyon, Saint-Étienne – 1998–2007
- Elhadji Pape Diaw – Angers – 2018–19
- Mory Diaw – Clermont, Le Havre – 2022–24, 2025–26
- Djibril Diawara – Le Havre, AS Monaco – 1994–99
- Souleymane Diawara – Le Havre, Sochaux, Bordeaux, Marseille, Nice – 1998–2000, 2002–06, 2007–15
- Famara Diédhiou – Angers – 2016–17
- **Yaya Diémé** – **Strasbourg** – 2025–
- Bamba Dieng – Marseille, Lorient, Angers – 2020–26
- El Hadji Dieye – Saint-Étienne – 2021–22
- Pape Daouda Diong – Strasbourg – 2024–25
- Mohamed Diongue – Nîmes Olympique – 1969–70
- Alioune Diop – Nîmes Olympique – 1960–61
- **Mouhamed Diop** – **Troyes** – 2026–
- Moustapha Papa Diop – Marseille – 2005–06
- Papa Bouba Diop – Lens – 2002–04
- Papa Malick Diop – Strasbourg, Lorient, Metz – 1999–2002, 2007–08
- Papakouli Diop – Rennes – 2006–07
- Pape Cheikh Diop – Lyon, Dijon – 2017–19, 2020–21
- **Pape Demba Diop** – Toulouse, **Strasbourg** – 2025–
- Pape Seydou Diop – Lens – 1998–99
- Saliou Diop – Brest – 2024–26
- El Hadji Diouf – Rennes, Lens – 1999–2002
- **Yehvann Diouf** – Reims, **Nice** – 2020–21, 2022–
- **Assane Dioussé** – Saint-Étienne, **Auxerre** – 2017–22, 2024–
- Dino Djiba – Metz – 2003–06, 2007–08
- Papy Djilobodji – Nantes, Dijon, Guingamp – 2013–15, 2017–19
- Moussa Djitté – Ajaccio – 2022–23
- Boukary Dramé – Paris SG, Sochaux – 2005–11

=== F ===
- Khalilou Fadiga – Auxerre – 2000–03
- Noah Fadiga – Brest – 2022–23
- Fallou Fall – Reims – 2022–23
- Pape Abdoulaye Fall – Marseille, Caen – 1987–90
- Jacques Faty – Rennes, Marseille, Sochaux – 2002–11
- Ricardo Faty – Strasbourg, Nantes, AC Ajaccio – 2005–06, 2008–09, 2012–14
- Abdoulaye Faye – Lens, Istres – 2002–05
- Abdoulaye Faye – Lorient – 2025–26
- Amdy Faye – Auxerre – 1999–2003
- Ibrahima Faye – Caen, Troyes – 2004–07
- Mamadou Faye – Bastia – 1994–98
- Maodomalick Faye – Saint-Étienne – 2006–08, 2009–10
- Mikayil Faye – Rennes – 2024–26
- Sérigné Faye – Montpellier – 2022–23
- **Souleymane Faye** – **Lorient** – 2026–
- Joachim Fernandez – Bordeaux, Caen – 1995–97

=== G ===
- Lamine Gassama – Lyon, Lorient – 2008–16
- Alfred Gomis – Dijon, Rennes – 2019–22
- **Georges Gomis** – **Le Havre** – 2025–
- Rémi Gomis – Caen, Valenciennes, Nantes – 2007–16
- Bernus Goram – AS Nancy – 1980–82
- Lemouya Goudiaby – Metz – 2017–18
- Abdoulaye Gueye – Sochaux, Brest – 1977–80, 1981–83
- Babacar Gueye – Metz – 2003–06, 2007–08
- Babacar Guèye – Troyes – 2015–16
- Cheikh Gueye – Metz – 2007–08
- **Dame Gueye** – **Le Mans** – 2026–
- Idrissa Gueye – Metz – 2025–26
- Idrissa Gana Gueye – Lille, Paris SG – 2010–15, 2019–22
- Lamine Gueye – Metz – 2020–22
- Magaye Gueye – Brest – 2012–13
- Makhtar Gueye – Saint-Étienne – 2018–19
- Moussa Gueye – Metz – 2014–15
- Pape Gueye – Marseille – 2020–24

=== J ===
- Ismail Jakobs – Monaco – 2021–25

=== K ===
- **Bingourou Kamara** – Strasbourg, Montpellier, **Lorient** – 2017–18, 2020–21, 2022–23, 2025–
- Mamadou Kambell-Seck – Strasbourg – 1988–89
- Mamadou Kane – Lille OSC – 1991–92
- Racine Amadou Kane – Metz, Brest – 1987–88, 1989–90
- Serigne Kara Mbodji – Nantes – 2018–19
- Abdoulaye Khouma Keita – AS Nancy – 2005–07
- Moussa Konaté – Amiens, Dijon – 2017–21
- Moussa Koné – Nîmes – 2019–21

=== L ===
- Alboury Lah – Paris SG – 1990–91
- Aboubacar Lô – Metz – 2023–24
- Dion Lopy – Reims – 2020–23
- Joseph Lopy – Sochaux – 2011–14

=== M ===
- Cheikh M'Bengue – Toulouse, Rennes, Saint-Étienne – 2007–19
- David Papys M'Bodji – Marseille, Lorient – 2002–03, 2006–07
- Pape M'Bow – Marseille – 2007–08, 2009–10
- Kader Mangane – Lens, Rennes, Gazélec Ajaccio, Strasbourg – 2007–12, 2015–16, 2017–18
- Boubacar Mansaly – Saint-Étienne – 2009–10
- Ibrahim Mbaye – Paris SG – 2024–26
- Malick Mbaye – Metz – 2023–24, 2025–26
- Adama Mbengue – Caen – 2017–19
- Amadou Mbengue – Metz – 2021–22
- **Pathé Mboup** – **Brest** – 2025–
- **Moustapha Mbow** – Reims, **Paris FC** – 2021–22, 2025–
- **Antoine Mendy** – **Nice** – 2022–
- Arial Mendy – Clermont – 2021–23
- Edouard Mendy – Reims, Rennes – 2018–21
- Formose Mendy – Lorient – 2023–24, 2025–26
- Frédéric Mendy – Saint-Étienne – 2004–06
- Nampalys Mendy – Monaco, Nice, Lens – 2010–11, 2013–16, 2017–18, 2023–25
- Roger Mendy – Toulon, Monaco – 1985–92

=== N ===
- Guirane N'Daw – Sochaux, Nantes, Saint-Étienne, Metz – 2002–11, 2014–15
- Alfred N'Diaye – Nancy – 2008–11
- Bassirou N'Diaye – Lorient – 2023–24
- Cheikh N'Diaye – Rennes – 2008–09
- Deme N'Diaye – Arles-Avignon, Lens – 2010–11, 2014–15
- Ismaïla N'Diaye – Caen – 2008–09, 2010–11
- Lamine N'Diaye – Mulhouse – 1989–90
- Leyti N'Diaye – Marseille, AC Ajaccio – 2004–05, 2007–08, 2010–13
- Makhtar N'Diaye – Rennes – 1999–2003
- Mamadou N'Diaye – Montpellier – 2014–17
- Mame N'Diaye – Marseille, Boulogne – 2005–06, 2009–10
- Momar N'Diaye – Metz – 2004–06, 2007–08
- Moussa N'Diaye – AS Monaco, Sedan, Istres, Ajaccio, Auxerre – 1998–03, 2004–07
- **Mouhamed Lamine Ndiaye** – **Le Havre** – 2026–
- Samba N'Diaye – Lille, Metz, Nantes – 1992–96, 1997–98
- Sylvain N'Diaye – Bordeaux, Lille, Marseille – 1996–97, 2000–05
- Cheikh N'Doye – Angers – 2015–17, 2018–19
- Mayoro N'Doye – Metz – 2014–15
- Ousmane N'Doye – Toulouse FC – 2003–04
- Saar N'Gor – Laval – 1988–89
- Abdoulaye Ndiaye – Brest – 2024–25
- Iliman Ndiaye – Marseille – 2023–24
- Massamba Ndiaye – Clermont – 2023–24
- **Rassoul Ndiaye** – **Le Havre** – 2023–
- Abdallah Ndour – Strasbourg – 2017–20
- Djime Ngom – Marseille – 2005–06
- Santy Ngom – Nantes – 2017–18
- Opa Nguette – Valenciennes, Metz – 2012–14, 2016–18, 2019–22
- **Moussa Niakhaté** – Metz, **Lyon** – 2017–18, 2024–
- Ibrahima Niane – Metz, Angers – 2017–18, 2019–23, 2024–25
- M'Baye Niang – Caen, Montpellier, Rennes, Bordeaux, Auxerre – 2010–12, 2013–14, 2018–23
- Mamadou Niang – Troyes, Metz, Strasbourg, Marseille – 2000–11
- Cheikh Niasse – Lille – 2019–20, 2021–22

=== P ===
- Ferdinand Pordié – Rennes, Troyes – 1946–49, 1954–55
- Oumar Pouye – Metz – 2007–08

=== S ===
- Cheikh Sabaly – Metz – 2020–22, 2023–24, 2025–26
- Youssouf Sabaly – Evian, Nantes, Bordeaux – 2013–21
- Jean-Christophe Sagna – Laval – 1977–82
- Lamine Sagna – Bordeaux – 1990–91
- Henri Saivet – Bordeaux, Saint-Étienne – 2007–17
- Diafra Sakho – Rennes – 2017–19
- Lamine Sakho – Lens, Marseille, Saint-Étienne – 1999–2003, 2004–06
- Massamba Sambou – Monaco, Le Havre – 2006–09
- Ibou Sané – Metz – 2023–24, 2025–26
- Lamine Sané – Bordeaux – 2009–16
- Oumar Sané – Le Havre, Metz – 1998–99, 2001–02
- Pape Sané – Caen – 2016–17
- **Sadibou Sané** – Metz, **Monaco** – 2023–24, 2025–
- Salif Sané – Bordeaux, AS Nancy – 2010–13
- Arouna Sangante – Le Havre – 2023–26
- Younousse Sankharé – Paris SG, Dijon, Valenciennes, Guingamp, Lille, Bordeaux – 2007–10, 2011–19
- Bouna Sarr – Metz, Marseille – 2014–21, 2025–26
- Ismaïla Sarr – Metz, Rennes, Marseille – 2016–19, 2023–24
- Kor Sarr – Caen – 2004–05
- Malang Sarr – Lyon, Strasbourg – 2016–20, 2022–23, 2024–26
- Mamadou Sarr – Nice, Monaco, Lens – 2022–26
- Mouhamadou-Naby Sarr – Lyon – 2013–14
- Pape Sarr – Saint-Étienne, Lens – 1999–2004
- Pape Matar Sarr – Metz – 2020–22
- Sidy Sarr – Nîmes – 2019–21
- Malick Seck – Lens – 2014–15
- Mamadou Seck – Ajaccio – 2002–05
- Badara Sène – Sochaux, Le Mans – 2005–08, 2009–10
- Oumar Sène – Laval, Paris SG – 1981–92
- Moussa Seydi – Metz – 2016–17
- **Abdallah Sima** – Angers, Brest, **Lens** – 2022–23, 2024–
- Pape Souaré – Lille, Reims – 2010–15
- Modou Sougou – Marseille, Evian – 2012–15
- Sambou Soumano – Lorient – 2021–22, 2025–26
- **Issa Soumaré** – Le Havre, **Rennes** – 2023–
- Ansou Sow – Lens – 2020–21
- Moussa Sow – Rennes, Lille OSC – 2004–12
- Pape Habib Sow – Sochaux – 2005–06
- **Lamine Sy** – **Auxerre** – 2025–
- Pape Sy – Metz – 2025–26
- Seydou Sy – Monaco – 2016–19
- Tony Sylva – Monaco, Lille – 1999–2008

=== T ===
- Hamadin Tall – RC Paris – 1961–62
- Ibrahim Tall – Sochaux, Nantes – 2002–05, 2008–09
- Pape Thiaw – Metz – 2003–04
- Sada Thioub – Nice, Nîmes, Angers, Saint-Étienne – 2014–15, 2018–22
- Alpha Touré – Metz – 2025–26
- Demba Touré – Lyon – 2002–03
- Zargo Touré – Boulogne, Lorient – 2009–10, 2015–17
- Amara Traoré – Gueugnon, Metz, Châteauroux – 1995–99

=== W ===
- Amadou Wade – Stade Français – 1959–62
- Omar Wade – Lille – 2010–11
- Ibrahima Wadji – Saint-Étienne – 2024–25
- Moussa Wagué – Nice – 2019–20

=== Y ===
- Thierno Youm – Laval, Nantes – 1984–92

== Serbia ==
=== A ===
- Branislav Aćimović – Sète – 1935–36
- Rajko Aleksić – Lyon – 1977–79
- Veljko Aleksić – AS Angoulême – 1969–70
- Komnen Andrić – Clermont – 2022–24
- Slobodan Antić – Nancy – 1979–80
- Aleksandar Aranđelović – RC Paris – 1951–52

=== B ===
- Stefan Babović – Nantes – 2008–09
- Mane Bajić – Lille – 1971–72
- Bojan Banjac – Lille – 1996–97
- Veljko Birmančević – Toulouse FC – 2022–23
- Milan Biševac – Lens, Valenciennes, Paris SG, Lyon, Metz – 2006–18
- Nenad Bjeković – Nice – 1976–81
- Nenad Bjeković – Nantes, Châteauroux – 1996–98
- Zdravko Borovnica – Bastia – 1982–83
- Miroslav Bošković – Angers – 1976–77
- Miloš Bursać – Toulon, Lyon – 1989–92

=== C ===
- Ivan Ćurković – Saint-Étienne – 1972–81
- Dragan Cvetković – Bastia – 1984–85

=== D ===
- Zoran Dakić – Reims, AC Ajaccio – 1970–72
- Milan Damjanović – Angers – 1971–75, 1976–77
- Miloš Ðelmaš – Nice – 1987–91
- Miloš Dimitrijević – Nantes, Grenoble – 2004–07, 2008–09
- Filip Đorđević – Nantes – 2008–09, 2013–14
- Slađan Đukić – Troyes – 1999–2001
- Vladimir Durković – Saint-Étienne – 1967–71
- Dragan Džajić – Bastia – 1975–77
- Nenad Džodić – Montpellier, Ajaccio – 1997–2006, 2009–10
- Stefan Džodić – Montpellier – 2024–25

=== G ===
- Milan Gajić – Bordeaux – 2015–19
- Milan Galić – Reims – 1970–73
- Svetislav Glišović – Stade Français – 1946–47
- Nenad Grozdić – Lens – 2000–01
- Dragan Gugleta – Strasbourg – 1967–69
- Ivan Gvozdenović – Metz – 2004–05

=== I ===
- Andrej Ilić – Lille – 2023–24
- Dejan Ilić – Istres – 2004–05
- Zvonko Ivezić – Sochaux – 1976–82

=== J ===
- Slobodan Janković – Lens – 1975–77
- Nenad Jestrović – Bastia, Metz – 1997–2000
- Vukašin Jovanović – Bordeaux – 2016–20
- Zoran Jovičić – Caen – 2004–05
- Vladimir Jugović – AS Monaco – 2001–02

=== K ===
- Stanislav Karasi – Lille OSC – 1974–77
- Mateja Kežman – Paris SG – 2008–11
- Branislav Kostić – Laval – 1976–77
- Nenad Kovačević – Lens – 2006–08, 2009–11
- Vladica Kovačević – Nantes – 1966–67
- Miloš Krasić – Bastia – 2013–14
- Petar Krivokuća – Rouen – 1977–78
- Dobrosav Krstić – Sochaux – 1964–66
- Nebojša Krupniković – Bastia – 1999

=== L ===
- Branko Lazarević – Caen – 2010–11
- Danijel Ljuboja – Sochaux, Strasbourg, Paris SG, Grenoble, Nice – 1998–99, 2000–01, 2002–05, 2009–11
- Ilija Lukić – Rennes – 1969–71
- Vladan Lukić – Metz – 1997–99
- Miloš Luković – Strasbourg – 2024–25

=== M ===
- Nikola Maksimović – Montpellier – 2024–25
- Milan Martinović – Ajaccio – 2003–04
- Igor Matić – Caen – 2004–05
- Nemanja Matić – Rennes, Lyon – 2023–25
- Stjepan Matić – Rennes – 1976–77
- Vojislav Melić – Sochaux – 1967–74
- Ljubomir Mihajlović – Lyon – 1970–77
- Igor Miladinović – Saint-Étienne – 2024–25
- Zoran Milinković – Nice – 1996–97
- Goran Milojević – Brest – 1990–91
- Slobodan Milosavljević – Valenciennes – 1970–71, 1972–73
- Selemir Milošević – Red Star – 1968–71
- Dejan Milovanović – Lens – 2009–10
- Bora Milutinović – Monaco, Nice – 1967–69, 1970–71
- Miloš Milutinović – RC Paris, Stade Français – 1961–65
- Dalibor Mitrović – Ajaccio – 2003–04
- Milorad Mitrović – Sète – 1933–34
- Stefan Mitrović – Strasbourg – 2018–21
- Slavoljub Muslin – Lille, Brest – 1981–86

=== N ===
- Velimir Naumović – Rennes – 1969–71
- Pavle Ninkov – Toulouse – 2011–17
- Miloš Ninković – Evian – 2012–13, 2014–15

=== O ===
- Predrag Ocokoljić – Toulouse FC – 2003–05
- Žarko Olarević – Lille – 1978–81

=== P ===
- Goran Pandurović – Rennes – 1995–98
- Dragan Pantelić – Bordeaux – 1981–83
- Ilija Pantelić – Marseille, Bastia, Paris SG – 1970–77
- Marko Pantelić – Paris SG – 1996–97
- Milinko Pantić – Le Havre – 1998–99
- Strahinja Pavlović – Monaco – 2020–21
- Nemanja Pejčinović – Nice – 2010–14
- Aleksandar Pešić – Toulouse – 2014–16
- Ilija Petković – Troyes – 1973–76
- Đorđe Petrović – Strasbourg – 2024–25
- Ognjen Petrović – Bastia – 1976–78
- Vladimir Petrović "Pižon" – Brest – 1985–86
- Josip Pirmajer – Nîmes Olympique – 1972–75

=== R ===
- Uroš Radaković – Nantes – 2025–26
- Nemanja Radonjić – Marseille – 2018–22
- Aleksandar Radovanović – Lens – 2020–21
- Milan Radović – Brest – 1981–84
- Ljubiša Rajković – Bastia – 1979–81
- Predrag Rajković – Reims – 2019–22
- Zevan Rakić – Bastia – 1970–71
- Ljubiša Ranković – Caen – 2004–05
- Zoran Rendulić – Grenoble – 2008–10
- Mihailo Ristić – Montpellier – 2018–22

=== S ===
- Spasoje Samardžic – Saint-Étienne – 1969–72
- Dušan Savić – Lille, Cannes – 1983–85, 1987–89
- Vujadin Savić – Bordeaux – 2010–11
- Stevan Sekereš – Nantes – 1967–68
- Laslo Seleš – Sochaux – 1969–78
- Milovan Sikimić – Guingamp – 2002–04
- Slobodan Škrbić – Lille – 1971–72
- Petar Škuletić – Montpellier – 2018–21
- Živko Slijepčević – Valenciennes – 1992–93
- Uroš Spajić – Toulouse FC – 2013–16
- Zlatko Spleit – Nîmes Olympique – 1960–61
- Jovan Stanković – Marseille – 2000–01
- Ivan Stevanović – Sochaux – 2009–10
- Ljubiša Stevanović – SC Nîmes – 1932–33
- Dragan Stojković – Marseille – 1990–94
- Nenad Stojković – Monaco, Montpellier, AS Nancy – 1984–86, 1987–88, 1990–91
- Vladimir Stojković – Nantes – 2006–07
- Neven Subotić – Saint-Étienne – 2017–19

=== T ===
- Silvester Takač – Rennes – 1967–69
- Đorđe Tomić – Guingamp – 1995–96
- Slobodan Topalović – Lyon – 1981–83
- Duško Tošić – Sochaux – 2005–07
- Dobrivoje Trivić – Lyon – 1971–73
- Bogdan Turudija – Troyes – 1976–78

=== V ===
- Dušan Veškovac – Toulouse, Troyes – 2013–17
- Milivoje Vitakić – Lille, Grenoble – 2004–07, 2008–10
- Nebojša Vučićević – Metz – 1989–90
- Ivan Vukomanović – Bordeaux – 1998–99
- Momčilo Vukotić – Bordeaux – 1978–79

=== Z ===
- Miodrag Živaljević – Lyon – 1979–80
- Nebojša Zlatarić – Marseille, Paris FC, Valenciennes – 1975–77, 1978–79, 1980–81

== Sierra Leone ==
- Juma Bah – Lens, Nice – 2024–26
- Mohamed Kallon – AS Monaco – 2004–05, 2006–08

== Slovakia ==
- János Chawko – Metz – 1951–52
- Ferdinand Faczinek – Sochaux – 1937–39
- Miloš Glonek – Caen – 1994–95, 1996–97
- **Dominik Greif** – **Lyon** – 2025–
- Tomáš Hubočan – Marseille – 2016–17
- Viliam Hýravý – Toulouse – 1991–92
- Milan Luhový – Saint-Étienne – 1992–93
- Ľubomír Moravčík – Saint-Étienne, Bastia – 1990–98
- Szilárd Németh – Strasbourg – 2005–06
- Carlo Pintér – Mulhouse – 1936–37
- Ján Popluhár – Lyon – 1968–70
- Mário Sauer – Toulouse – 2025–26
- Adolf Scherer – Nîmes Olympique – 1969–72
- Filip Šebo – Valenciennes – 2007–10
- Milan Škriniar – Paris SG – 2023–25
- Dušan Tittel – Nîmes Olympique – 1991–93
- Alexander Vencel – Strasbourg, Le Havre – 1994–2000, 2002–03
- Róbert Vittek – Lille – 2008–10

== Slovenia ==
- Milenko Ačimovič – Lille – 2004–06
- Vili Ameršek – Angers – 1976–79
- Robert Berić – Saint-Étienne – 2015–20
- Valter Birsa – Sochaux, Auxerre – 2006–09, 2008–11
- Miha Blažič – Angers – 2022–23
- Boštjan Cesar – Marseille, Grenoble – 2005–07, 2008–10
- Marko Elsner – Nice – 1987–90
- Adriano Fegic – AS Nancy – 1985–86
- Bojan Jokić – Sochaux – 2007–10
- Ažbe Jug – Bordeaux – 2013–15
- Rene Krhin – Nantes – 2017–20
- Tony Kurbos – Metz, Nice, Monaco – 1982–85, 1987–88, 1989
- **Srđan Kuzmić** – **Lorient** – 2026–
- Džoni Novak – Le Havre, Sedan – 1996–2000
- Milan Osterc – Le Havre – 2003
- Denis Petrić – Troyes, Angers, Nantes – 2015–17, 2019–20, 2023–24
- Jan Repas – Caen – 2017–19
- Ermin Šiljak – Bastia – 1996–97
- Vinko Trskan – Marseille – 1947–48
- Miha Zajc – Toulouse – 2024–25
- Luka Žinko – Istres – 2004–05

== South Africa ==
- Keagan Dolly – Montpellier – 2016–21
- Kermit Erasmus – Rennes – 2015–17
- Lyle Foster – Monaco – 2019–20
- Pierre Issa – Marseille – 1996–2000
- Thabang Molefe – Le Mans – 2003–04
- Lebo Mothiba – Lille, Strasbourg, Troyes – 2017–20, 2021–24
- Katlego Mphela – Strasbourg – 2003–05
- Anele Ngcongca – Troyes – 2015–16
- Lebogang Phiri – Guingamp – 2017–19
- Bongani Zungu – Amiens – 2017–20

== South Korea ==
- Ahn Jung-hwan – Metz – 2005–06
- Hong Hyun-seok – Nantes – 2025–26
- Hwang Ui-jo – Bordeaux – 2019–22
- Jung Jo-gook – Auxerre, Nancy – 2010–12
- Kang Jin-wook – Metz – 2005–06
- Kwon Chang-hoon – Dijon – 2016–19
- Kwon Hyeok-kyu – Nantes – 2025–26
- Lee Kang-in – Paris SG – 2023–26
- Lee Sang-yoon – Lorient – 1998–99
- Nam Tae-hee – Valenciennes – 2008–11
- Ou Kyoung-jun – Metz – 2007–08
- Park Chu-young – Monaco – 2008–11
- Seo Jung-won – Strasbourg – 1998–99
- Suk Hyun-jun – Troyes, Reims – 2017–20, 2021–22
- Yun Il-lok – Montpellier – 2019–21

== Spain ==
- Antonio Abenoza – Reims – 1947–52
- Sergio Akieme – Reims – 2023–25
- José Arana Gorrostegui – Excelsior Roubaix – 1938–39
- Mikel Arteta – Paris SG – 2000–02
- Salvador Artigas – Rennes – 1945–49, 1952–53
- Marco Asensio – Paris SG – 2023–25
- César Azpilicueta – Marseille – 2010–12
- Antonio Ballesteros – Angers – 1962–63
- Domènec Balmanya – Sète – 1937–39
- José Javier Barkero – Toulouse FC – 2000–01
- Yuri Berchiche – Paris SG – 2017–18
- Juan Bernat – Paris SG – 2018–23
- Rubén Blanco – Marseille – 2022–24
- Oriol Busquets – Clermont – 2021–22
- Mario Cabanes Sabat – Metz – 1937–38
- José Caeiro – Rennes – 1956–57
- Kevin Carlos – Nice – 2025–26
- Francisco José Carrasco – Sochaux – 1989–92
- Albert Celades – Bordeaux – 2003–04
- Pedro Chirivella – Nantes – 2020–25
- Esteban Cifuentes – Strasbourg – 1937–38
- Marc Crosas – Lyon – 2007–08
- Diego Cuenca – Sedan – 1955–57
- Sergi Darder – Lyon – 2015–17
- Iván de la Peña – Marseille – 1999–00
- Enrique de Lucas – Paris SG – 2000–01
- Heliodoro Delgado – Toulouse FC (1937), RC Paris, Metz – 1946–53
- Álex Domínguez – Toulouse – 2024–25
- Patrico Equizadu – Rennes – 1952–53
- Josep Escolà – Sète – 1937–39
- Francesc Fàbregas – Monaco – 2018–22
- Jesus Fandino – Metz – 1972–73
- **Ansu Fati** – **Monaco** – 2025–
- Christian Fernandez – Marseille – 1977–78
- **Dro Fernández** – **Paris SG** – 2025–
- Lorenzo Fernández – Nîmes Olympique – 1954–55
- Alfonso Fernandez Leal – Lyon – 1991–93
- José Manuel Galdames – Toulouse FC – 1997–99
- Antonio García – Le Havre, Lille – 1945–48
- Lazare Garcia – Sète – 1947–48
- Manu García – Toulouse FC – 2018–19
- Javier Garrido – Saint-Étienne – 2004–05
- César Gelabert – Toulouse FC – 2023–24
- Esteban Gómez – Strasbourg, Toulouse FC (1937), Rennes – 1945–47, 1948–51
- Álvaro González – Marseille – 2019–22
- Juan José González Tacoronte – FC Nancy – 1953–54
- Ander Herrera – Paris SG – 2019–22
- Francisco Iriondo Orozco – Sète – 1935–36
- Jesé – Paris SG – 2016–17, 2019–21
- Koke – Marseille – 2003–05
- Pol Lirola – Marseille – 2020–22, 2024–26
- Borja López – Monaco – 2013–14
- Cristian López – Angers – 2018–19
- Gerard López – Monaco – 2005–07
- Pau López – Marseille – 2021–24
- José Mandaluniz Ealo – Stade Français – 1946–47
- Javier Manquillo – Marseille – 2015–16
- Valentin Martín – Stade Français – 1950–52
- Rafael Martín Vázquez – Marseille – 1992
- Paco Mateo – Strasbourg – 1945–50
- **Eliezer Mayenda** – **Rennes** – 2026–
- Alfredo Megido – Bordeaux – 1977–78
- Álvaro Mejía – Arles-Avignon – 2010–11
- José Luis Molinuevo – RC Paris – 1945–47
- Fernando Morientes – AS Monaco, Marseille – 2003–04, 2009–10
- Francisco Navarro – Bordeaux – 1962–66
- Justo Nuevo – Red Star, Lille OSC, Le Havre, Rennes – 1945–53
- **Jacobo Ortega** – **Strasbourg** – 2026–
- **Oso** – **Strasbourg** – 2026–
- Luis Osoro – Montpellier – 1947–48
- José Padrón Martín – Alès, Cannes, Sochaux – 1935–38
- Sinforiano José Padrón Martín – FC Nancy – 1953–54
- Sergi Palencia – Bordeaux, Saint-Étienne – 2018–20
- Rubén Pardo – Bordeaux – 2019–22
- Cristóbal Parralo – Paris SG – 2001–03
- Secundo Pascual – Strasbourg, Stade Français – 1945–51
- Francisco Pavón – Arles-Avignon – 2010–11
- Ignacio Pavon – Marseille – 1962–63
- Alfonso Pérez – Marseille – 2001–02
- Manuel Pérez – Alès – 1947–48
- Iván Pérez Muñoz – Bordeaux – 1998–99
- Josep Raich Garriga – Sète – 1937–38
- Sergio Ramos – Paris SG – 2021–23
- Luis Regueiro – RC Paris – 1937–38
- Sergio Rico – Paris SG – 2019–22
- Albert Riera – Bordeaux – 2003–05
- Alberto Rivera Pizarro – Marseille – 2001–02
- **Fabián Ruiz** – **Paris SG** – 2022–
- Emilio Salaber – Nîmes Olympique, Sedan, Strasbourg – 1956–65, 1966–69
- José Sanchez – Sochaux – 1965–71
- Pablo Sarabia – Paris SG – 2019–23
- Angel Segurola – Bordeaux – 1962–63
- Jaime Solas – Lyon – 1959–61
- Carlos Soler – Paris SG – 2022–24
- Daniel Solsona – Bastia – 1983–86
- Arnau Tenas – Paris SG – 2023–25
- Brandon Thomas – Rennes – 2017–18
- **Raúl Torrente** – **Le Mans** – 2026–
- **Ferran Torres** – **Paris SG** – 2026–
- Víctor Torres Mestre – Bordeaux – 1998–2000
- Santiago Urtizberea – Bordeaux – 1945–47
- Miguel Valls – Ajaccio – 1970–71
- Julian Vaquero – Toulouse FC (1937) – 1950–51
- Juan Vila – Marseille, SO Montpellier – 1945–48
- Ramón Zabalo – RC Paris – 1937–39

== Sweden ==
- Jeremy Agbonifo – Lens – 2024–25
- Gunnar Andersson – Marseille, Bordeaux – 1950–58, 1959–60
- Kennet Andersson – Lille, Caen – 1993–95
- **Genesis Antwi** – **Strasbourg** – 2026–
- Joel Asoro – Metz – 2023–24, 2025–26
- Pär Bengtsson – Nice – 1950–52
- Pierre Bengtsson – Bastia – 2016–17
- Henrik Bertilsson – Martigues – 1994–96
- Yngve Brodd – Toulouse FC (1937), Sochaux – 1953–62
- Jens Cajuste – Reims – 2021–23
- Patrik Carlgren – Nantes – 2024–26
- Henry Carlsson – RC Paris – 1948–49
- Mikael Dorsin – Strasbourg – 2003–04
- Jimmy Durmaz – Toulouse – 2016–19
- Erik Edman – Rennes – 2005–08
- Ralf Edström – AS Monaco – 1981–83
- Ove Eklund – Reims – 1974–75
- Dan Ekner – Marseille – 1950–51
- Johnny Ekström – Cannes – 1989–91
- Niclas Eliasson – Nîmes – 2020–21
- Johan Elmander – Toulouse – 2006–08
- Lars Eriksson – Sète, Toulouse FC (1937) – 1953–55
- Leif Eriksson – Nice – 1970–75
- Alexander Farnerud – Strasbourg – 2003–06
- Pontus Farnerud – AS Monaco, Strasbourg – 1998–2006
- Amar Fatah – Troyes – 2022–23
- Gabriel Gudmundsson – Lille – 2021–25
- Petter Hansson – Rennes, AS Monaco – 2007–11
- Åke Hjalmarsson – Nice, Lyon, Troyes – 1950–51, 1952–53, 1954–56
- Niklas Hult – Nice – 2014–16
- Zlatan Ibrahimović – Paris SG – 2012–16
- Klas Ingesson – Marseille – 2000–01
- Andreas Isaksson – Rennes – 2004–06
- **Isak Jansson** – **Nice** – 2025–
- Malcolm Jeng – Reims – 2024–25
- Gunnar Johansson – Marseille – 1950–58
- Jakob Johansson – Rennes – 2018–19
- Egon Johnsson – Stade Français, Lens, Toulon – 1950–51, 1952–57, 1959–60
- Karl-Johan Johnsson – Guingamp, Strasbourg – 2016–19, 2024–26
- Jon Jönsson – Toulouse – 2007–08
- Alexander Kačaniklić – Nantes – 2016–18
- Kim Källström – Rennes, Lyon – 2003–12
- Isaac Kiese Thelin – Bordeaux – 2015–17
- Emil Krafth – Amiens – 2018–19
- Mayckel Lahdo – Nantes – 2025–26
- Johan Larsson – Guingamp – 2018–19
- Anders Linderoth – Marseille – 1977–80
- Arne Lundqvist – Reims – 1953–55
- Roger Magnusson – Marseille, Red Star – 1968–75
- Bror Mellberg – Sochaux – 1956–57
- **Sebastian Nanasi** – **Strasbourg** – 2024–
- Lasse Nilsson – Saint-Étienne – 2007–08
- Stellan Nilsson – Marseille – 1953–54
- **Sion Oppong** – **Toulouse** – 2026–
- Yksel Osmanovski – Bordeaux – 2001–02
- Lennart Samuelsson – Nice – 1950–51
- Amin Sarr – Lyon – 2022–24
- Karl Svensson – Caen – 2007–09
- Michael Svensson – Troyes – 2001–02
- Emra Tahirović – Lille – 2007–08
- Ola Toivonen – Rennes, Toulouse – 2013–18
- Christian Wilhelmsson – Nantes – 2006–07
- Oliver Zandén – Toulouse FC – 2022–23

== Switzerland ==
- Almen Abdi – Le Mans – 2009–10
- André Abegglen – Sochaux – 1934–38
- Claude Andrey – Mulhouse – 1982–83
- **Zachary Athekame** – **Lyon** – 2026–
- Umberto Barberis – Monaco – 1980–83
- Gabriel Barès – Montpellier – 2024–25
- Pierre Beetschen – Lyon – 1956–60, 1961–64
- Diego Benaglio – Monaco – 2017–19
- Loris Benito – Bordeaux – 2019–21
- Kurt Bertsch – Saint-Étienne – 1946–47
- Ferdinand Bruhin – Marseille – 1933–42
- Arnaud Bühler – Sochaux – 2005–06
- Alexandre Bürger – Cannes, Toulouse FC (1937) – 1945–48
- Ricardo Cabanas – Guingamp – 2003–04
- Fabio Celestini – Troyes, Marseille – 2000–04
- Pierre-Albert Chapuisat – Paris FC – 1972–73
- Davide Chiumiento – Le Mans – 2005–06
- Eray Cömert – Nantes – 2023–24
- Alexandre Comisetti – Auxerre – 1999–2001
- Joël Corminbœuf – Strasbourg – 1993–94
- Michel Decastel – Strasbourg – 1979–81
- Breel Embolo – Monaco, Rennes – 2022–26
- Innocent Emeghara – Lorient – 2011–13
- Norbert Eschmann – Marseille, Stade Français – 1958–60, 1960–63
- Julián Estéban – Rennes – 2006–09
- Jacques Fatton – Lyon – 1954–57
- Lucien Favre – Toulouse – 1983–84
- Edimilson Fernandes – Brest – 2024–25
- Gelson Fernandes – Saint-Étienne, Rennes – 2009–10, 2014–17
- Alexander Frei – Rennes – 2002–05
- Michael Frey – Lille – 2014–15
- Alessandro Frigerio – Le Havre – 1938–39
- Philippe Fuchs – Saint-Étienne, Lyon – 1939, 1945–46
- **Ulisses Garcia** – **Marseille** – 2023–
- Alain Geiger – Saint-Étienne – 1988–90
- Gaetano Giallanza – Nantes – 1997–98
- Dylan Gissi – Montpellier – 2014–15
- Albert Gougain – Sochaux, Red Star, Le Havre – 1933–39
- Marco Grassi – Rennes, AS Monaco, Cannes, Lyon – 1994–99
- Stéphane Grichting – Auxerre – 2002–12
- Daniel Gygax – Lille, Metz – 2005–06, 2007–08
- Bernt Haas – Bastia – 2004–05
- Silvan Hefti – Montpellier – 2023–24
- Alfred Jäck – Olympique Lillois – 1936–37
- Daniel Jeandupeux – Bordeaux – 1975–78
- Goran Karanović – Angers – 2015–16
- **Philipp Köhn** – **Monaco** – 2023–
- Edmond Kramer – SC Nîmes, Nice – 1932–34
- Dereck Kutesa – Reims – 2019–22
- Jean-Pierre La Placa – Toulouse FC – 1997–98
- Léo Lacroix – Saint-Étienne – 2016–18
- Stephan Lichtsteiner – Lille – 2005–08
- Johann Lonfat – Sochaux – 2002–06
- Jordan Lotomba – Nice – 2020–25
- Badile Lubamba – Troyes – 2002–03
- **Felix Mambimbi** – **Le Havre** – 2025–
- Jean-Claude Milani – Nantes – 1988–90
- François Moubandje – Toulouse – 2013–19
- Patrick Müller – Lyon, Monaco – 2000–04, 2006–09
- **Yvon Mvogo** – **Lorient** – 2022–24, 2025–
- Dan Ndoye – Nice – 2020–22
- Christophe Ohrel – Rennes, Saint-Étienne – 1994–96
- **Bryan Okoh** – **Auxerre** – 2025–
- Bećir Omeragić – Montpellier – 2023–25
- Jonas Omlin – Montpellier – 2020–23
- Roger Pasquini – Saint-Étienne – 1938–39, 1946–47
- Raimondo Ponte – Bastia – 1981–82
- Philippe Pottier – Stade Français, Angers – 1961–67
- Anthony Racioppi – Dijon – 2020–21
- Joseph Rich – Saint-Étienne, FC Nancy – 1938–39, 1945–48
- Fabian Rieder – Rennes – 2023–24, 2025–26
- Alain Rochat – Rennes – 2005–06
- Jean-Pierre Rochat – Alès – 1947–48
- Vincent Rüfli – Dijon – 2016–18
- Xherdan Shaqiri – Lyon – 2021–22
- Vincent Sierro – Toulouse – 2022–25
- Kevin Spadanuda – Ajaccio – 2022–23
- Jacques Spagnoli – Olympique Lillois – 1937–38
- Nestor Subiat – Mulhouse, Saint-Étienne – 1989–90, 1999–2000
- Jean Tamini – Saint-Étienne – 1950–52
- Sébastien Wüthrich – Montpellier – 2014–16
- **Denis Zakaria** – **Monaco** – 2023–

== References and notes ==
=== Books ===
- Barreaud, Marc (1998). Dictionnaire des footballeurs étrangers du championnat professionnel français (1932-1997). L'Harmattan, Paris. ISBN 2-7384-6608-7.
- Tamás Dénes; Pál Peterdi; Zoltán Rochy; József Selmeci (1999). Kalandozó magyar labdarúgók. ISBN 963-85967-0-8.

=== Club pages ===
- AJ Auxerre former players
- AJ Auxerre former players
- Girondins de Bordeaux former players
- Girondins de Bordeaux former players
- Les ex-Tangos (joueurs), Stade Lavallois former players
- Olympique Lyonnais former players
- Olympique de Marseille former players
- FC Metz former players
- AS Monaco FC former players
- Ils ont porté les couleurs de la Paillade... Montpellier HSC Former players
- AS Nancy former players
- FC Nantes former players
- Paris SG former players
- Red Star Former players
- Red Star former players
- Stade de Reims former players
- Stade Rennais former players
- CO Roubaix-Tourcoing former players
- AS Saint-Étienne former players
- Sporting Toulon Var former players

=== Others ===
- stat2foot
- footballenfrance
- French Clubs' Players in European Cups 1955-1995, RSSSF
- Finnish players abroad, RSSSF
- Italian players abroad, RSSSF
- Romanians who played in foreign championships
- Swiss players in France, RSSSF
- EURO 2008 CONNECTIONS: FRANCE, Stephen Byrne Bristol Rovers official site

== Notes ==
1. Born in Argentina
2. Born in Austria
3. Born in Belgium
4. Born in Bosnia and Herzegovina
5. Born in Bosnia and Herzegovina (then part of Independent State of Croatia)
6. Born in Bosnia and Herzegovina (then part of SFR Yugoslavia)
7. Born in Cameroon
8. Born in Canada
9. Born in Cape Verde
10. Born in Colombia
11. Born in Croatia
12. Born in Croatia (then part of Independent State of Croatia)
13. Born in Croatia (then part of Kingdom of Yugoslavia)
14. Born in Croatia (then part of SFR Yugoslavia)
15. Born in the Democratic Republic of Congo (then Zaïre)
16. Born in England
17. Born in France
18. Born in Germany
19. Born in Italy
20. Born in Ivory Coast
21. Born in Kosovo (then part of Kingdom of Yugoslavia)
22. Born in Kosovo (then part of SFR Yugoslavia)
23. Born in Montenegro (then part of SFR Yugoslavia)
24. Born in Nigeria
25. Born in Portugal
26. Born in Serbia (then part of SFR Yugoslavia)
27. Born in Slovenia (then part of Nazi Germany)
28. Born in Spain
29. Born in the United States
30. Born in Zambia
31. Capped for the Basque Country national football team
32. Capped for the Catalonia national football team
33. Capped for the Galicia national football team
34. Capped for the France national under-21 football team
35. Capped for the France national under-20 football team
36. Capped for the France national under-19 football team
37. Capped for the France national under-18 football team
38. Capped for the France national under-17 football team
39. Capped for the France national under-16 football team
40. Capped for the Germany national under-21 football team
41. Capped for the Italy national B team
42. Capped for the Italy national under-21 football team
43. Capped for the Slovenia national under-21 football team
44. Capped for the Slovenia national under-20 football team
45. Capped for the Slovenia national under-19 football team
46. Capped for the Slovenia national under-18 football team
47. Capped for the Slovenia national under-17 football team
48. Capped for the Spain national under-21 football team
49. Capped for the Spain national under-19 football team
50. Capped for the Spain national under-18 football team
51. Capped for the United States national under-20 football team
52. Capped for the United States national under-17 football team
