= 1988 African Cup of Champions Clubs final =

1988 African Champions Cup final
Iwuanyanwu Nationale	Entente de Sétif
(Nigeria)	(Algeria)
1	4

First leg
Iwuanyanwu Nationale	Entente de Sétif
1	0
- Date: 26 November 1988
- Venue: Liberty Stadium, Ibadan
- Referee: Idrissa Traoré (Mali)
- Attendance: 25,000

Second leg
Entente de Sétif	Iwuanyanwu Nationale
4	0
- Date: 9 December 1988
- Venue: Stade 17 Juin (Note: Stade 17 Juin 1962 changed the name to Stade Mohamed Hamlaoui in 1992.It was renamed by the president Mohamed Boudiaf.), Constantine
- Referee: Badara Sène (Senegal)
- Attendance: 55,000

The 1988 African Cup of Champions Clubs final was a football tie held over two legs in November and December 1988 between eventual winners Entente de Sétif of Algeria, (Note: Entente de Sétif was the name of ES Sétif from 1987 to 1989.) and Nigeria's Iwuanyanwu Nationale FC. (Note: Iwuanyanwu Nationale FC is called Heartland FC since 2006.)

== Road to the final ==
(Algeria) Entente de Sétif				Round	(Nigeria) Iwuanyanwu Nationale FC			
Opponent	Agg.	1st leg	2nd leg	Round	Opponent	Agg.	1st leg	2nd leg
Bye				Preliminary round	Bye			
(Mali) Stade Malien	5–1	1–1 (away)	4–0 (home)	First round	(Benin) Requins de l'Atlantique FC	3–0	2–0 (home)	1–0 (away)
(Tunisia) ES Sahel	3–2	1–2 (away)	2–0 (home)	Second round	(Cameroon) Tonnerre Yaoundé	4–3	2–0 (home)	2–3 (away)
(Gabon) FC 105 Libreville	4–3	1–3 (away)	3–0 (home)	Quarter-finals	(Ivory Coast) Africa Sports	3–2	2–0 (home)	1–2 (away)
(Egypt) Al Ahly SC	2–2 (4–2p)	2–0 (home)	0–2 (away)	Semi-finals	(Morocco) FAR Rabat	5–5 (5–3p)	4–1 (home)	1–4 (away)

== First leg ==
=== Match details ===
26 November 1988
--:-- UTC+1

Iwuanyanwu Nationale (Nigeria)	1–0	(Algeria) Entente de Sétif
Ozogula 29'

Liberty Stadium, Ibadan
Attendance: 25,000
Referee: Idrissa Traoré (Mali)

Iwuanyanwu Nationale:
GK	–	(Ghana) Edward Ansah
DF	–	(Nigeria) Ramson Madu
DF	–	(Nigeria) Godwin Eke
DF	–	(Nigeria) Andrew Uwe
MF	–	(Nigeria) Uwakwe Eke
MF	–	(Nigeria) Friday Ekpo
MF	–	(Nigeria) Thompson Oliha
FW	–	(Nigeria) Paul Uzokwe
MF	–	(Nigeria) Lawrence Ukaegbu
FW	–	(Nigeria) Michael Obiku
DF	–	(Nigeria) Samson Ozogula
Substitutes:
GK	–	(Nigeria) Wahab Haruna
Manager:
(Greece) Dimitris Theofanis

Entente de Sétif:
GK	1	(Algeria) Antar Osmani
DF	2	(Algeria) Djamel Nabti
DF	3	(Algeria) Kamel Adjas
DF	4	(Algeria) Ammar Bernaoui
DF	5	(Algeria) Abdelhakim Serrar (c)
MF	6	(Algeria) Dhia Eddine Djihad Boulahdjilet
FW	–	(Algeria) Chawki Raïs	Substituted off
MF	8	(Algeria) Malik Zorgane
FW	9	(Algeria) Abderrazak Rahmani
MF	10	(Algeria) Nacer Adjissa
FW	–	(Algeria) Ammar Doudou	Substituted off
Substitutes:
GK	–	(Algeria) Fayçal Kessai
FW	–	(Algeria) Derradji Bendjaballah	Substituted on
FW	–	(Algeria) Abderrahim Bendjaballah	Substituted on
Manager:
(Algeria) Abdelkrim Khelfa
Technical Director:
(Algeria) Mokhtar Aribi

== Second leg ==
=== Match details ===
9 December 1988
--:-- UTC+1

Entente de Sétif (Algeria)	4–0	(Nigeria) Iwuanyanwu Nationale
Zorgane 50'; Rahmani 52'; Uwe 85' (o.g.); A. Bendjaballah 87'

Stade 17 Juin, Constantine
Attendance: 55,000
Referee: Badara Sène (Senegal)

Entente de Sétif:
GK	1	(Algeria) Antar Osmani
DF	2	(Algeria) Djamel Nabti
DF	3	(Algeria) Kamel Adjas
DF	4	(Algeria) Ammar Bernaoui
MF	6	(Algeria) Dhia Eddine Djihad Boulahdjilet	Substituted off
FW	7	(Algeria) Abderrahim Bendjaballah
MF	8	(Algeria) Malik Zorgane	Substituted off
FW	9	(Algeria) Mustapha Gharib
MF	10	(Algeria) Nacer Adjissa
FW	11	(Algeria) Hamid Rahmouni
DF	14	(Algeria) Abdelhakim Serrar (c)
Substitutes:
GK	–	(Algeria) Fayçal Kessai
MF	–	(Algeria) Chawki Raïs	Substituted on
MF	–	(Algeria) Ammar Doudou	Substituted on
FW	–	(Algeria) Derradji Bendjaballah
FW	–	(Algeria) Salah Bourahla
Absents:
FW	–	(Algeria) Abderrazak Rahmani
Manager:
(Algeria) Abdelkrim Khelfa
Technical Director:
(Algeria) Mokhtar Aribi

Iwuanyanwu Nationale:
GK	1	(Ghana) Edward Ansah
DF	3	(Nigeria) Godwin Eke
DF	4	(Nigeria) Cyril Levi (c)
DF	5	(Nigeria) Toyin Ayinla
MF	6	(Nigeria) Andrew Uwe
FW	7	(Nigeria) Uwem Ekarika
MF	8	(Nigeria) Samson Ozogula
FW	9	(Nigeria) Uwakwe Eke
MF	10	(Nigeria) Friday Ekpo
FW	11	(Nigeria) Lawrence Ukaegbu
DF	14	(Nigeria) John Benson
Substitutes:
MF	13	(Nigeria) Peter Nieketien
FW	15	(Nigeria) Paul Uzokwe
GK	–	(Nigeria) Wahab Haruna
DF	–	(Nigeria) Ramson Madu
MF	–	(Nigeria) Thompson Oliha
Absents:
FW	–	(Nigeria) Michael Obiku
Manager:
(Greece) Dimitris Theofanis
