= List of ES Sétif international footballers =

This is a list of players, past and present, who have been capped by their country in international football whilst playing for Entente Sportive de Sétif. a further 2 nations have fielded ES Sétif players in their international sides.

== Players ==
Key
^{+}	Players participated in the African Cup of Nations
GK	Goalkeeper
DF	Defender
MF	Midfielder
FW	Forward
Bold	Still playing competitive football

=== Algerien players ===
ES Sétif Algerian international footballers
Name	Position	Date of first cap	Debut against	Date of last cap	Final match against	Caps	Ref
Laid Belhamel	MF	4 Sep 2003	Qatar	26 Sep 2003	Burkina Faso	3	
Isâad Bourahli	FW	21 Apr 2000	Cape Verde	4 May 2001	Morocco	13	
**Faouzi Chaouchi**	GK	12 Aug 2009	Uruguay	13 Jun 2010	Slovenia	10	
**Abdelmoumene Djabou**	MF	17 Nov 2010	Luxembourg	14 Nov 2017	Central African Republic	3	
Lamouri Djediat	MF	31 May 2008	Senegal	11 Feb 2009	Benin	9	
Farès Fellahi	FW	29 Mar 2003	Angola	3 Feb 2004	Zimbabwe	8	
**Abderahmane Hachoud**	DF	12 Nov 2011	Tunisia	2 Jun 2012	Rwanda	3	
Lazhar Hadj Aïssa	MF	8 Oct 2005	Gabon	27 Mar 2011	Morocco	8	
Samir Hadjaoui	GK	2 Jun 2007	Cape Verde	16 Jun 2007	Guinea	3	
Nabil Hemani	FW	20 Aug 2008	United Arab Emirates	18 Nov 2008	Mali	3	
Abdelkader Laïfaoui	DF	12 Aug 2009	Uruguay	28 Dec 2010	Chad	7	
Khaled Lemmouchia	MF	31 May 2008	Senegal	4 Jun 2011	Morocco	19	
Hocine Metref	MF	17 Nov 2010	Luxembourg	28 Dec 2010	Chad	2	
Slimane Raho	DF	31 May 2008	Senegal	3 Mar 2010	Serbia	14	
Antar Osmani	GK	20 Jan 1989	Ivory Coast	13 Jan 1992	Ivory Coast	17	
Abdelhakim Serrar	DF	10 Jun 1983	Uganda	7 Apr 1991	Tunisia	15	
Kamel Adjas	DF	13 Nov 1988	Mali	13 Jan 1992	Ivory Coast	25	
Hamid Rahmouni	FW	4 Feb 1990	Romania	4 Feb 1990	Romania	1	
Nacereddine Adjissa	MF	30 Jul 1989	Qatar	30 Jul 1989	Qatar	1	
Abdelhamid Salhi	MF	19 Jul 1965	Ivory Coast	23 Mar 1975	Tunisia	29	
Adel Maïza	DF	11 Feb 2009	Benin	11 Feb 2009	Benin	1	

=== Foreign players ===
ES Sétif Foreign international footballers
Name	Position	Date of first cap	Debut against	Date of last cap	Final match against	Caps	Ref
(Gabon) **Benjamin Zé Ondo**	DF	7 Sep 2013	Burkina Faso	14 Jun 2015	Ivory Coast	8	
(Central African Republic) **Eudes Dagoulou**	MF	9 Oct 2014	Morocco	28 Mar 2016	Madagascar	4	
(Gabon) **Franck Obambou**	DF	11 Nov 2017	Mali	14 Nov 2017	Botswana	2	

== Players in international competitions ==
=== African Cup Players ===
(Algeria) 1990 African Cup

- (Algeria) Antar Osmani
- (Algeria) Kamel Adjas
- (Algeria) Abdelhakim Serrar
- (Algeria) Hamid Rahmouni

(Senegal) 1992 African Cup

- (Algeria) Antar Osmani
- (Algeria) Kamel Adjas
- (Algeria) Mohamed Tribèche

(Tunisia) 2004 African Cup

- (Algeria) Farès Fellahi

(Angola) 2010 African Cup

- (Algeria) Khaled Lemmouchia
- (Algeria) Slimane Raho
- (Algeria) Abdelkader Laïfaoui
- (Algeria) Faouzi Chaouchi

(South Africa) 2013 African Cup

- (Algeria) Mohamed Amine Aoudia

(Equatorial Guinea) 2015 African Cup

- (Gabon) Benjamin Zé Ondo

=== World Cup Players ===
(South Africa) World Cup 2010

- (Algeria) Abdelkader Laïfaoui
- (Algeria) Faouzi Chaouchi

=== Olympic Players ===
(Soviet Union) 1980 Summer Olympics

- (Algeria) Mohamed Rahmani

(Brazil) 2016 Summer Olympics

- (Algeria) Miloud Rebiaï
- (Algeria) Ryad Kenniche
- (Algeria) Zakaria Haddouche
