= 1982–83 MP Oran season =

MC Oran
1982–83 season
- Chairman: Ghalem Chaouch
- Head coach: Habib Draoua & Abdellah Kechra
- Stadium: Stade 19 juin 1965
- National 1: 5th
- Algerian Cup: Quarter-finals
- Top goalscorer: League: Sami Bendjahene (6 goals); All: Sami Bendjahene (6 goals)
- Highest home attendance: 29,253 vs. GCR Mascara (15 October 1982)
- Lowest home attendance: 4,249 vs. ASC Oran (15 April 1983)
- Average home league attendance: 9,643

In the 1982–83 season, MC Oran is competing in the National for the 19th time, as well as the Algerian Cup. It is their 19th consecutive season in the top flight of Algerian football. They will be competing in National 1 and the Algerian Cup.

== Squad list ==
Players and squad numbers last updated on 18 November 1976.
Note: Flags indicate national team as has been defined under FIFA eligibility rules. Players may hold more than one non-FIFA nationality.

No.	Nat.	Position	Name	Date of birth (age)	Signed from
Goalkeepers
Defenders
Midfielders
Forwards

== Competitions ==
=== Overview ===
Competition	Record								Started round	Final position / round	First match	Last match
Competition	G	W	D	L	GF	GA	GD	Win %	Started round	Final position / round	First match	Last match
National	30	9	12	9	29	26	+3	30.00	—N/a	5th	17 September 1982	17 June 1983
Algerian Cup	3	2	0	1	5	3	+2	66.67	Round of 32	Quarter-finals	4 February 1983	1 April 1983
Total	33	11	12	10	34	30	+4	33.33				

=== Championnat National ===
==== League table ====
Pos	Team	Pld	W	D	L	GF	GA	GD	Pts	Qualification or relegation
3	ESM Bel-Abbès	30	9	14	7	22	32	−10	62	
4	MP Alger	30	10	10	10	35	33	+2	60	Algerian Cup Winner, qualified for Cup Winners' Cup
5	MP Oran	30	9	12	9	29	26	+3	59 (Note: 1 point deducted?)	
6	USM El Harrach	30	9	12	9	25	25	0	59 (Note: 1 point deducted?)	
7	CM Belcourt	30	8	13	9	23	26	−3	59	

Source: rsssf.com

=== Results by round ===
Round	1	2	3	4	5	6	7	8	9	10	11	12	13	14	15	16	17	18	19	20	21	22	23	24	25	26	27	28	29	30
Ground	H	A	H	A	H	A	H	A	H	A	H	A	H	A	H	A	H	A	H	A	H	A	H	A	H	A	H	A	H	A
Result	D	L	W	W	W	D	D	D	L	L	D	L	W	L	W	L	D	L	D	L	W	D	W	D	D	D	D	L	W	W
Position	6	14	9	8	6	5	6	5	6	9	7	10	8	9	10	8	10	10	12	12	13	12	7	10	8	9	9	13	9	5

Source: Competitive matches
A = Away; H = Home; W = Win; D = Draw; L = Loss

=== Matches ===
17 September 1982 Round 1	MP Oran	1–1	USM El Harrach	Oran
	Benmimoun 90'		Baya 81'	Stadium: Ahmed Zabana Stadium; Attendance: 16,551; Referee: Othmane

24 September 1982 Round 2	EP Sétif	3–0	MP Oran	Sétif
				Stadium: Stade 8 Mai 1945

1 October 1982 Round 3	MP Oran	3–0	MA Hussein Dey	Oran
				Stadium: Ahmed Zabana Stadium

8 October 1982 Round 4	ESM Bel-Abbès	1–2	MP Oran	Sidi Bel Abbes
	Bellatoui 68'		Bendjahene 1', 18'	Stadium: Stade 24 Fevrier 1956; Referee: Sayeh

15 October 1982 Round 5	MP Oran	4–1	GCR Mascara	Oran
	Bendjahene 21', 52'; Benmimoun 34', 49'		Belloumi 72'	Stadium: Ahmed Zabana Stadium; Attendance: 29,253; Referee: Bergui

29 October 1982 Round 6	WKF Collo	1–1	MP Oran	Collo
				Stadium: Stade Benjamâa Amar

5 November 1982 Round 7	MP Oran	1–1	MP Alger	Oran
	Bendjehane 51'		5' Bousri	Stadium: Ahmed Zabana Stadium

12 November 1982 Round 8	ASC Oran	2–2	MP Oran	Oran
	Boukar 39'; Belkhira 55'		Medahi 9'; Ouanes 63'	Stadium: Ahmed Zabana Stadium; Attendance: 13,715; Referee: Rachid Medjiba

26 November 1982 Round 9	MP Oran	0–1	ESM Guelma	Oran
			Harid 89'	Stadium: Ahmed Zabana Stadium; Attendance: 6,817; Referee: Bouzareg

3 December 1982 Round 10	CM Belcourt	1–0	MP Oran	Belouizdad
	Zaghzi 71'			Stadium: Stade 20 Août 1955; Attendance: 3,254; Referee: Amar Ghotari

10 December 1982 Round 11	MP Oran	0–0	ISM Aïn Béïda	Oran
				Stadium: Ahmed Zabana Stadium; Attendance: 6,814; Referee: Garoui

24 December 1982 Round 12	JE Tizi-Ouzou	2–0	MP Oran	Tizi Ouzou
	Aouis ?'; Baris ?'			Stadium: Stade 1er Novembre 1954

31 December 1982 Round 13	MP Oran	1–0	WO Boufarik	Oran
	Baroudi 39' (pen.)			Stadium: Ahmed Zabana Stadium; Attendance: 7,583; Referee: Othmane

7 January 1983 Round 14	RS Kouba	4–1	MP Oran	Kouba
	Kebboul 22'; Ouidir 43'; Hamada 57'; Sabki 60'		Sebah 72'	Stadium: Stade Omar Benhaddad; Attendance: 1,887; Referee: Morgsi

21 January 1983 Round 15	MP Oran	2–1	USK Alger	Oran
	Bendjahene 64'; Benmimoun 85'		80' Boutamine	Stadium: Ahmed Zabana Stadium; Attendance: 8.713; Referee: Belaïd Lacarne

28 January 1983 Round 16	USM El Harrach	2–1	MP Oran	El Harrach
	Meziani 61', ?'		Belhachemi 7'	Stadium: Stade 1er Novembre 1954; Attendance: 4,700; Referee: Keddouri

11 February 1983 Round 17	MP Oran	0–0	EP Sétif	Oran
				Stadium: Ahmed Zabana Stadium; Attendance: 4,862; Referee: Bergui

18 February 1983 Round 18	MA Hussein Dey	1–0	MP Oran
	M Merzekane 73'			Attendance: 4,000; Referee: Amar Ghotari

11 March 1983 Round 19	MP Oran	0–0	ESM Bel-Abbès	Oran
				Stadium: Ahmed Zabana Stadium; Attendance: 7,510; Referee: Bounaga

18 March 1983 Round 20	GCR Mascara	2–1	MP Oran	Mascara
	Khelili 6'; Chibani 16'		Ouanes 32'	Stadium: Stade Meftah Aouad; Attendance: 12,000; Referee: Bouzareg

25 March 1983 Round 21	MP Oran	3–0	WKF Collo	Oran
	Bensaoula 31', 81'; Ouanes 43'			Stadium: Ahmed Zabana Stadium; Attendance: 5,898; Referee: Roumani

8 April 1983 Round 22	MP Alger	1–1	MP Oran	Algiers
	Zenir 44'		88' Ouanes	Stadium: July 5, 1962 Stadium; Attendance: 6,000; Referee: Morgsli

15 April 1983 Round 23	MP Oran	2–0	ASC Oran	Oran
	Baroudi 45' (pen.); Bensaoula 47'			Stadium: Ahmed Zabana Stadium; Attendance: 4,249; Referee: Tighilt

25 April 1983 Round 24	ESM Guelma	0–0	MP Oran	Guelma
				Referee: Rachid Medjiba

29 April 1983 Round 25	MP Oran	0–0	CM Belcourt	Oran
				Stadium: Ahmed Zabana Stadium; Attendance: 10,074; Referee: Amar Ghotari

27 May 1983 Round 26	ISM Aïn Béïda	0–0	MP Oran	Aïn Beïda
				Stadium: Stade 24 avril

3 June 1983 Round 27	MP Oran	0–0	JE Tizi-Ouzou	Oran
				Stadium: Ahmed Zabana Stadium; Attendance: 7,045; Referee: Mohamed Mimoun

10 June 1983 Round 28	WO Boufarik	2–1	MP Oran	Boufarik
				Stadium: Stade Mohamed Reggaz

13 June 1983 Round 29	MP Oran	2–0	RS Kouba	Oran
				Stadium: Ahmed Zabana Stadium

17 June 1983 Round 30	USK Alger	0–1	MP Oran	Bologhine
			37' (pen.) Baroudi	Stadium: Omar Hamadi Stadium; Attendance: 10,000; Referee: Amar Ghotari

== Algerian Cup ==
4 February 1983 Round of 32	MP Oran	2–0	JS Djijel

3 March 1983 Round of 16	MP Oran	3–1	ISM Aïn Béïda

1 April 1983 Quarter-finals	RS Kouba	2–0	MP Oran

== Squad information ==
=== Appearances and goals ===
Only 23 games from 30 in National appearances

No.	Pos	Nat	Player	Total		National		Algerian Cup	
No.	Pos	Nat	Player	Apps	Goals	Apps	Goals	Apps	Goals
Goalkeepers
-	GK	(Algeria) ALG	Bachir Sebaâ	23	0	23	0	0	0
Defenders
-	DF	(Algeria) ALG	Lahouari Abdad	10	0	10	0	0	0
-	DF	(Algeria) ALG	Baghdad Baroudi	20	3	20	3	0	0
-	DF	(Algeria) ALG	Abdelafid Bellabès	13	0	13	0	0	0
-	DF	(Algeria) ALG	Rabah Bentis	13	0	13	0	0	0
-	DF	(Algeria) ALG	Saïd Belouakli	20	0	20	0	0	0
-	DF	(Algeria) ALG	Lahouari Chaïb	20	0	20	0	0	0
Midfielders
-	MF	(Algeria) ALG	Boutkhil Benyoucef	21	0	21	0	0	0
-	MF	(Algeria) ALG	Benyagoub Sebbah	22	1	22	1	0	0
-	MF	(Algeria) ALG	Lakhdar Benmahi	10	0	10	0	0	0
-	MF	(Algeria) ALG	Habib Benmimoun	19	4	19	4	0	0
-	MF	(Algeria) ALG	Mohamed Chikh	8	0	8	0	0	0
-	MF	(Algeria) ALG	Abdelhamid Youcef	5	0	5	0	0	0
-	MF	(Algeria) ALG	Sami Bendjahene	18	6	18	6	0	0
-	MF	(Algeria) ALG	Ouanes Mechkour	14	4	14	4	0	0
Forwards
-	FW	(Algeria) ALG	Tedj Bensaoula	14	3	14	3	0	0
-	FW	(Algeria) ALG	Rachid Itim	8	0	8	0	0	0
-	FW	(Algeria) ALG	Lahouari Lakhal	9	0	9	0	0	0
-	FW	(Algeria) ALG	Medahi	8	1	8	1	0	0
-	FW	(Algeria) ALG	Sellini	5	0	5	0	0	0
-	FW	(Algeria) ALG	Belhachemi	5	1	5	1	0	0

Last updated: 25 November 2017
Source: footballvintage.net

=== Goalscorers ===
Includes all competitive matches. The list is sorted alphabetically by surname when total goals are equal.

No.	Nat.	Player	Pos.	National 1	Cup	TOTAL
?	(Algeria)	Sami Bendjahene	MF	6	?	?
?	(Algeria)	Ouanes Mechkour	MF	4	?	?
?	(Algeria)	Habib Benmimoun	MF	4	?	?
?	(Algeria)	Baghdad Baroudi	DF	3	?	?
?	(Algeria)	Tedj Bensaoula	FW	3	?	?
?	(Algeria)	Medahi	FW	1	?	?
?	(Algeria)	Belhachemi	FW	1	?	?
?	(Algeria)	Benyagoub Sebbah	MF	1	?	?
Own Goals				0	0	0
Totals				29	5	34
