= Obou Macaire =

Ivorian footballer (born 1970)

Personal information
- Date of birth: 28 December 1970 (age 55)
- Position: Goalkeeper

International career
Years	Team	Apps	(Gls)
1995–1996	Ivory Coast	8	(0)

Obou Macaire (born 28 December 1970) is an Ivorian former footballer who played as a goalkeeper. He made eight appearances for the Ivory Coast national team in 1995 and 1996. He was also named in Ivory Coast's squad for the 1994 African Cup of Nations tournament.
