= Mohamed Saad Shehata =

Egyptian footballer (born 1961)

Personal information
- Date of birth: 8 February 1961 (age 65)

Senior career*
Years	Team	Apps	(Gls)
- Al Mokawloon Al Arab SC

International career
1990	Egypt	3	(0)
- * Club domestic league appearances and goals

Mohamed Saad Shehata (born 8 February 1961) is an Egyptian footballer. He played in three matches for the Egypt national football team in 1990. He was also named in Egypt's squad for the 1990 African Cup of Nations tournament.
