= Adolphe Mendy =

Senegalese footballer

Personal information
- Date of birth: 16 January 1960 (age 66)

International career
Years	Team	Apps	(Gls)
1986–1997	Senegal	65	(1)

Adolphe Mendy (born 16 January 1960) is a Senegalese former footballer. He played in 21 matches for the Senegal national football team from 1985 to 1997. He was also named in Senegal's squad for the 1990 African Cup of Nations tournament.
