= Talaat Mansour =

Egyptian footballer (born 1967)

Personal information
- Date of birth: 26 February 1967 (age 59)

Senior career*
Years	Team	Apps	(Gls)
- Zamalek SC

International career
1990–1994	Egypt	17	(0)
- * Club domestic league appearances and goals

Talaat Mansour (born 26 February 1967) is an Egyptian footballer. He played in 17 matches for the Egypt national football team from 1990 to 1994. He was also named in Egypt's squad for the 1990 African Cup of Nations tournament.
