= Mamadou Diarra (footballer, born 1970) =

Senegalese footballer

Personal information
- Date of birth: 18 October 1970 (age 56)
- Position: Striker

International career
Years	Team	Apps	(Gls)
1989–1994	Senegal	14	(3)

Mamadou Diarra (born 18 October 1970) is a Senegalese footballer who plays as a striker. He played in eleven matches for the Senegal national football team from 1992 to 1994. He was also named in Senegal's squad for the 1990 African Cup of Nations tournament.
