= John Odie =

Kenyan footballer (born 1964)

Personal information
- Date of birth: 5 July 1964 (age 62)

International career
Years	Team	Apps	(Gls)
1993	Kenya	2	(0)

John Odie (born 5 July 1964) is a Kenyan footballer. He played in two matches for the Kenya national football team in 1993. He was also named in Kenya's squad for the 1990 African Cup of Nations tournament.
