= Tajudeen Oyekanmi =

Nigerian footballer

Personal information
- Date of birth: 23 February 1969 (age 57)

International career
Years	Team	Apps	(Gls)
1990	Nigeria	2	(0)

Tajudeen Oyekanmi (born 23 February 1969) is a Nigerian footballer. He played in two matches for the Nigeria national football team in 1990. He was also named in Nigeria's squad for the 1990 African Cup of Nations tournament.
