= Abdul Aminu =

Nigerian footballer

Personal information
- Date of birth: 21 February 1965 (age 61)

International career
Years	Team	Apps	(Gls)
1990–1992	Nigeria	10	(1)

Abdul Aminu (born 21 February 1965) is a Nigerian footballer. He played in ten matches for the Nigeria national football team from 1990 to 1992. He was also named in Nigeria's squad for the 1990 African Cup of Nations tournament.
