= Fawzi Gamal =

Egyptian footballer (born 1966)

Personal information
- Full name: Fawzi Gamal
- Date of birth: 23 October 1966 (age 60)
- Place of birth: Ismailia, Egypt
- Height: 1.80 m (5 ft 11 in)
- Position: Defender

Senior career*
Years	Team	Apps	(Gls)
1987–1998	Ismaily		
1998–1999	Al-Qanah		

International career
1989–1996	Egypt	58	(1)
- * Club domestic league appearances and goals

Fawzi Gamal (Arabic: فوزي جمال) is an Egyptian retired footballer.

== Career ==
Fawzi played club football for Ismaily.

He was also part of the Egypt national football team at 4 successive African Cup of Nations, 1990, 1992, 1994 and 1996. He also played in 1994 FIFA World Cup qualification.
