= John Busolo =

Kenyan footballer (born 1965)

Personal information
- Date of birth: 13 March 1965 (age 61)
- Position: Goalkeeper

International career
Years	Team	Apps	(Gls)
1990–1996	Kenya	5	(0)

John Busolo (born 13 March 1965) is a Kenyan footballer. He played in five matches for the Kenya national football team from 1990 to 1996. He was also named in Kenya's squad for the 1990 African Cup of Nations tournament.
