= Henry Nyandoro =

Kenyan footballer (1969–1998)

Henry Nyandoro (20 October 1969 – 28 August 1998) was an international Kenyan football midfielder. He played for AFC Leopards from 1987 to 1990 and for Shabana Kisii from 1990 to 1996.

== International career ==
Nyandoro played for the Kenya national team, participating in the 1992 African Cup of Nations.
