= Roger Mendy =

Senegalese footballer

Personal information
- Date of birth: 8 February 1960 (age 66)
- Place of birth: Dakar, Senegal
- Height: 1.84 m (6 ft 0 in)
- Position: Defender

Senior career*
Years	Team	Apps	(Gls)
1978–1986	ASC Jeanne d'Arc		
1986–1989	Toulon	105	(6)
1989–1992	Monaco	85	(4)
1992–1994	Pescara	27	(2)

International career
1979–1995	Senegal	87	(3)
- * Club domestic league appearances and goals

Roger Mendy (born 8 February 1960) is a Senegalese former professional footballer who played as a defender. He spent three years playing for AS Monaco, with whom he reached the 1992 UEFA Cup Winners' Cup Final. He previously had spells with ASC Jeanne d'Arc and Sporting Club Toulon. He finished his career in Italy with Pescara Calcio.

== Honours ==
Monaco

- Coupe de France: 1990–91
