= Lamine Sagna =

Senegalese footballer (born 1969)

Personal information
- Date of birth: 17 November 1969 (age 56)
- Place of birth: Dakar, Senegal
- Position: Midfielder

Senior career*
Years	Team	Apps	(Gls)
1989–1990	ASC Jaraaf		
1990–1991	Bordeaux	1	(0)
1991–1994	ASC Jaraaf		

International career
1989–1996	Senegal	15	(0)
- * Club domestic league appearances and goals

Lamine Sagna (born 17 November 1969) is a Senegalese former professional footballer who played as a midfielder for ASC Jaraaf and French club Bordeaux. He made 15 appearances for the Senegal national team from 1992 to 1996. He was also named in Senegal's squad for the 1990 African Cup of Nations tournament.
