= 1982–83 Algerian Championnat National =

Algerian Championnat National
- Season: 1982–83
- Champions: JE Tizi-Ouzou
- Relegated: ISM Aïn Béïda; USK Alger
- Matches: 240
- Goals: 463 (1.93 per match)
- Top goalscorer: Abdesslem Bousri (19 goals)

The 1982–83 Algerian Championnat National was the 21st season of the Algerian Championnat National since its establishment in 1962. A total of 16 teams contested the league, with JE Tizi-Ouzou as the defending champions, The Championnat started on September 17, 1982. and ended on June 17, 1983.

== Team summaries ==
=== Promotion and relegation ===
Teams promoted from Algerian Division 2 1982–1983

- Chlef SO
- JS Bordj Ménaïel

Teams relegated to Algerian Division 2 1983–1984

- ISM Aïn Béïda
- USK Alger

== League table ==
Pos	Team	Pld	W	D	L	GF	GA	GD	Pts	Qualification or relegation
1	JE Tizi-Ouzou	30	17	7	6	41	22	+19	71	League Champions, qualified for African Cup
2	EP Sétif	30	14	10	6	40	19	+21	68	
3	ESM Bel-Abbès	30	9	14	7	22	32	−10	62	
4	MP Alger	30	10	10	10	35	33	+2	60	Algerian Cup Winner, qualified for Cup Winners' Cup
5	MP Oran	30	9	12	9	29	26	+3	59 (Note: 1 point deducted?)	
6	USM El Harrach	30	9	12	9	25	25	0	59 (Note: 1 point deducted?)	
7	CM Belcourt	30	8	13	9	23	26	−3	59	
8	ESM Guelma	30	10	9	11	30	38	−8	59	
9	ASC Oran	30	8	13	9	27	25	+2	58 (Note: 1 point deducted?)	
10	MA Hussein Dey	30	11	8	11	32	31	+1	58 (Note: 2 points deducted?)	
11	WKF Collo	30	7	14	9	27	26	+1	58	
12	GCR Mascara	30	11	6	13	29	32	−3	58	
13	WO Boufarik	30	11	6	13	31	38	−7	58	
14	RS Kouba	30	10	7	13	30	34	−4	57	
15	ISM Aïn Béïda	30	10	7	13	25	33	−8	57	Relegated
16	USK Alger	30	8	10	12	21	31	−10	56	Relegated

Source: rsssf.com

== Statistics ==
=== Hat-tricks ===
Player	For	Against	Result	Date	Ref
(Algeria) Abdesslem Bousri^{4}	MP Alger	ESM Guelma	4–3	21 January 1983	
(Algeria) Boulouh	ESM Guelma	MP Alger	3–4	21 January 1983	
(Algeria) Nacer Adjissa^{4}	EP Sétif	MP Alger	5–1	14 April 1983	

Note

^{4} Player scored 4 goals
