= Thompson Oliha =

Nigerian footballer

Personal information
- Full name: Thompson Oliha
- Date of birth: 4 October 1968
- Place of birth: Benin City, Nigeria
- Date of death: 30 June 2013 (aged 44)
- Place of death: Ilorin, Nigeria
- Position: Midfielder

Senior career*
| Years | Team | Apps | (Gls) |
| 1985–1987 | Bendel Insurance | | |
| 1988–1991 | Iwuanyanwu Nationale | | |
| 1992–1994 | Africa Sports | | |
| 1994–1995 | Maccabi Ironi Ashdod | 21 | (1) |
| 1995–1996 | Antalyaspor | 20 | (4) |

International career
| 1988–1994 | Nigeria | 31 | (2) |
- * Club domestic league appearances and goals

Thompson Oliha (4 October 1968 – 30 June 2013) was a Nigerian professional footballer who played as a midfielder for clubs in Africa and Europe during an injury-shortened career.

== Club career ==
Oliha played for Bendel Insurance (1985–1987), Iwuanyanwu Nationale (1988–1991), Africa Sports (1992–1993), Maccabi Ironi Ashdod (1993–1994) and Antalyaspor (1994–1995). As a player, he was known for his powerful shots and abilities in the air. Oliha retired at the age of 27, as a result of a serious knee injury.

== International career ==
Oliha made a total of 31 appearances for the full Nigeria national team, scoring two goals. He made his international debut in 1988, in a game against Cameroon and made his last appearance at the 1994 FIFA World Cup, as a late substitute against Italy.

Oliha also played at the 1987 FIFA World Youth Championship.

== Death ==
Oliha died due to complications from malaria on 30 June 2013. At the time of his death he was an assistant coach for the Kwara Football Academy.
