= Adama Cissé =

Senegalese footballer

Personal information
- Date of birth: 21 March 1967 (age 59)
- Position: Midfielder

International career
Years	Team	Apps	(Gls)
1992–1995	Senegal	6	(0)

Adama Cissé (born 21 March 1967) is a Senegalese footballer. He played in six matches for the Senegal national football team from 1992 to 1995. He was also named in Senegal's squad for the 1990 African Cup of Nations tournament.
