= Kamel Adjas =

Algerian footballer (born 1963)

Personal information
- Date of birth: 3 January 1963 (age 63)
- Place of birth: Sétif, Algeria
- Position: Defender

Youth career
- ES Sétif

Senior career*
Years	Team	Apps	(Gls)
1980–1993	ES Sétif		

International career
1988–1992	Algeria	23	(0)
- * Club domestic league appearances and goals

Kamel Adjas (born 3 January 1963) is an Algerian former footballer who played as a defender.

== Honours ==
ES Sétif

- Algerian Championship: 1987; runner-up 1983, 1986
- Algerian Cup: 1989
- African Cup of Champions Clubs: 1988
- Afro-Asian Club Championship: 1989

Algeria

- Africa Cup of Nations: 1990
- Afro-Asian Cup of Nations: 1991
