= 1982–83 Algerian Cup =

كأس الجزائر

Tournament details
- Country: Algeria

Final positions
- Champions: MP Alger (4)
- Runners-up: ASC Oran

The 1982–83 Algerian Cup was the 21st edition of the Algerian Cup. MP Alger defeated ASC Oran in the final, 4-3. The winning goal was scored in the 110th minute.

DNC Alger, the defending champions, did not reach the National Stage of the Cup.

== Quarter-finals ==
1 April 1983	MP Alger	1 – 0	CR Belcourt	Stade 5 Juillet 1962, Algiers

1 April 1983	RS Kouba	2 – 0	MP Oran

1 April 1983	ASC Oran	1 – 0	GCR Mascara

1 April 1983	USM El Harrach	2 – 0	EP Sétif	Stade du 1er Novembre 1954, Tizi Ouzou

== Semi-finals ==
6 May 1983	MP Alger	1 – 0	RS Kouba	Stade 5 Juillet 1962, Algiers

6 May 1983	ASC Oran	2 – 1	USM El Harrach	17 June Stadium, Constantine
	Lefdjah; Belkheïra		Loucif

== Final ==
=== Match ===
20 May 1983
19:00

MP Alger	4 - 3	ASC Oran
Bousri 16', 46'; Bencheikh 58'; Bellemou 111'	Report (in French)	57' (pen.) Tasfaout; 10', 87' Lefdjah

Stade 5 Juillet 1962, Algiers
Attendance: 80.000
Referee: Ghotari
