= Antar Osmani =

Algerian footballer (born 1960)

Personal information
- Full name: Antar Osmani
- Date of birth: 22 February 1960 (age 66)
- Place of birth: Sétif
- Position: Goalkeeper

Youth career
- USM Sétif
- 1976–1978: ES Sétif

Senior career*
| Years | Team | Apps | (Gls) |
| 1978–1986 | ES Sétif | - | (-) |
| 1986 | USM Bel Abbès | - | (-) |
| 1986–1995 | ES Sétif | - | (-) |

International career
| 1979 | Algeria U20 | 2 | (0) |
| 1989–1992 | Algeria | 18 | (0) |
- * Club domestic league appearances and goals

Antar Osmani (born 22 February 1960) is a former Algerian football goalkeeper.

An Algerian international from 1989 to 1992, he was a member of the Algeria national football team that won the 1990 African Cup of Nations and the 1991 Afro-Asian Cup of Nations. He was also a member of the Algeria under-20 national team that won the 1979 African Youth Championship.

== Honours ==
=== Club ===
- ES Sétif
  - Algerian Championnat National: 1986–87
  - African Cup of Champions Clubs: 1988
  - Afro-Asian Club Championship: 1989
  - Algerian Cup: 1989

=== Country ===
- Algeria U20
  - African Youth Championship: 1979
- Algeria
  - Africa Cup of Nations: 1990
  - Afro-Asian Cup of Nations: 1991

== Individual ==
- Africa Cup of Nations Team of the Tournament:1990
