= Abdelhakim Serrar =

Algerian footballer (born 1961)

Personal information
- Full name: Abdelhakim Serrar
- Date of birth: 24 April 1961 (age 65)
- Place of birth: Sétif, Algeria
- Position: Defender

Senior career*
Years	Team	Apps	(Gls)
1985–1991	ES Sétif		

International career
1983	Algeria Olympic	1	(0)
1983–1991	Algeria	15	(2)
- * Club domestic league appearances and goals

Abdelhakim Serrar (born 24 April 1961) is an Algerian former professional football player who won the African Nations Cup in 1990 and is one of only a handful of players that won the Afro-Asian Cup for both club and country. Serrar played as a central defender throughout his career for Entente sportive de Sétif. He is currently the president of ES Sétif, and since his presidency the club has been arguably one of the best teams in the division. He retired from football on 1 July 1991 at the age of 30.

== Presidency ==
He sacked coach Azzedine Aït Djoudi immediately after the end of the game between ES Sétif and ES Tunis due to the elimination of the club in the second leg of the semi-final of the Arab Champions League played in Rades Stadium.

Zekri was sacked from his managerial position at ES Sétif on 18 August 2010, due to the poor results gained at the 2010 CAF Champions League group stage. The 1–0 loss against Zimbabwe side Dynamos was the final straw for Abdelhakim Serrar.

On 19 August 2010, Abdelhakim Serrar mentioned that former Italian physical trainer Gianni Solinas is likely to become head coach of ES Sétif.

== Honours ==
As a player:

- Champion from Algeria in 1987
- Vice Champion of Algeria in 1986
- Winner of the Cup of Algeria in 1989
- Winner of the Champions League CAF in 1988
- Winner of the Afro-Asian Cup in 1989
- Won the African Cup of Nations in 1990
- Winner of the Afro-Asian Cup in 1991

As president of ES Setif :

- Champion from Algeria in 2007 and 2009
- Winner Cup of Algeria in 2010 and 2012
- Runners Supercup Algeria in 2007
- Won the Arab Champions League in 2007 and 2008
- Finalist in the CAF Cup in 2009
- Winner of the Coupe North African club champions in 2009
