= 1972 African Cup of Nations squads =

Below is a list of squads used in the 1972 African Cup of Nations.

== Group A ==
=== Cameroon ===
Coach: (Germany) Peter Schnittger

No.	Pos.	Player	Date of birth (age)	Caps	Goals	Club
	GK	Zacharie "Jean-Parade" Egoué				
	GK	Bernard M'Bengalack				(Cameroonian Football Federation) Diamant Yaoundé
	GK	Moïse Essombé				
	DF	Norbert Owona	1951			(Cameroonian Football Federation) Union Douala
	DF	Apollin Simo				
	DF	Paul N'Lend				
	DF	Jean-Paul Akono	1 January 1952 (aged 20)			
	DF	Michel Kaham	1 June 1952 (aged 19)			(Cameroonian Football Federation) Aigle Nkongsamba
	DF	Gustave Evou Boulon				
	DF	François Bekombo Kwedi				(Cameroonian Football Federation) Caïman Douala
	MF	Jean-Marie Tsébo	31 December 1945 (aged 26)			(Cameroonian Football Federation) Aigle Nkongsamba
	MF	Jean Moutassié				
6	MF	Emmanuel Mve Elemva	6 January 1946 (aged 26)			(Cameroonian Football Federation) Canon Yaoundé
8	MF	Paul-Gaston Ndongo				
	MF	Emmanuel Eteme				
9	FW	Charles Léa	16 January 1951 (aged 21)			(Cameroonian Football Federation) Canon Yaoundé
	FW	Philippe Mouthé				
	FW	Jean Manga Onguéné	12 June 1946 (aged 25)			(Cameroonian Football Federation) Canon Yaoundé
18	FW	Jean-Pierre Tokoto	26 January 1948 (aged 24)			(French Football Federation) Olympique de Marseille
15	FW	Joseph Yegba Maya	8 April 1944 (aged 27)			(French Football Federation) US Valenciennes
11	FW	Jean-Baptiste Ndoga	1945			(Cameroonian Football Federation) Union Douala
	FW	Dieudonné Bassanguen				

=== Kenya ===
Coach/Player: Jonathan Niva

No.	Pos.	Player	Date of birth (age)	Caps	Goals	Club
	GK	James Siang'a	1949 (aged 22 or 23)			(Football Kenya Federation) Gor Mahia
	DF	Jonathan Niva	16 May 1942 (aged 29)			(Football Kenya Federation) Gor Mahia
	DF	John Oduor				
	DF	Samson Odore				(Football Kenya Federation) Kenya Breweries
	DF	Charles Makunda				
	DF	Daniel Anyanzwa				
	MF	Peter "Pelé" Ouma				
	MF	Allan Thigo				(Football Kenya Federation) Gor Mahia
	MF	Jackson Aluko				(Football Kenya Federation) Gor Mahia
	MF	Livingstone Madegwa				(Football Kenya Federation) Abaluhya United
	FW	John Nyawanga				(Football Kenya Federation) Kenya Breweries
	FW	William Ouma	1945			(Football Kenya Federation) Luon Union
	FW	Daniel Nicodemus				(Football Kenya Federation) Gor Mahia

=== Mali ===
Coach: (Germany) Karl-Heinz Weigang

No.	Pos.	Player	Date of birth (age)	Caps	Goals	Club
	GK	Séydou Traoré				(Malian Football Federation) Real Bamako
	GK	Bassirou Diamoutèné				(Malian Football Federation) Djoliba AC
1	GK	Mamadou Keïta	20 October 1947 (aged 24)			(Malian Football Federation) Stade Malien
	DF	Talibé Diané				
4	DF	Kidian Diallo	1944			(Malian Football Federation) Real Bamako
12	DF	Moctar Maïga				
	DF	Idrissa Maiga				
	DF	Checkna Traoré				
	DF	Idrissa Coulibaly				
3	DF	Cheick Sangaré				
18	MF	Adama Traoré				
6	MF	Boubacar Traoré				
8	MF	Ousmane Traoré				
14	FW	Bako Touré	7 December 1939 (aged 32)			(French Football Federation) Blois
	FW	Issa Yatayasse				
10	FW	Salif Keïta	8 December 1946 (aged 25)			(French Football Federation) Saint-Étienne
19	FW	Moussa Traoré	2 December 1952 (aged 19)			(Malian Football Federation) Stade Malien
20	FW	Sadia Cissé	15 April 1944 (aged 27)			(Malian Football Federation) Djoliba AC
17	FW	Moussa Diakhité				
11	FW	Fantamady Keita	25 September 1949 (aged 22)			(Malian Football Federation) Real Bamako
	FW	Cheikh Diallo	12 April 1951 (aged 20)			(Malian Football Federation) Stade Malien
	FW	Idrissa Kanté				

=== Togo ===
Coach: (Germany) Gottlieb Göller

No.	Pos.	Player	Date of birth (age)	Caps	Goals	Club
	GK	Tommy Sylvestre	31 August 1946 (aged 25)			(Togolese Football Federation) Étoile Filante de Lomé
	DF	Damawuzan Ayitégan				
	DF	Ohin Anyaku				
	DF	Hermann Hunkpati (C)	1945 (aged 26 or 27)			(Togolese Football Federation) Modèle de Lomé
	DF	Sanni Kponton				
	MF	Emmanuel Atsou				
	MF	Luc Agbala	23 September 1947 (aged 24)			(Togolese Football Federation) Dynamic Togolais
	MF	Michel Sokpo				
	MF	Arnold Nyémébuéo				
	FW	Omer Sadji				
	FW	Edmond Apéti Kaolo	1946 (aged 25 or 26)			(Togolese Football Federation) Étoile Filante de Lomé
	FW	Covi Adé				
	FW	Clément Kpadé				
	FW	Pindra Sawoè				

== Group B ==
=== Congo ===
Coach: (Republic of the Congo) Adolphe "Amoyen" Bibandzoulou

No.	Pos.	Player	Date of birth (age)	Caps	Goals	Club
1	GK	Maxime Matsima	18 November 1940 (aged 31)			(Congolese Football Federation) Diables Noirs
	GK	Emmanuel Mboungou				(Congolese Football Federation) CARA Brazzaville
	GK	Paul Tandou				(Congolese Football Federation) Diables Noirs
	DF	Serge Samuel Boukaka	1942 (aged 29 or 30)			(Congolese Football Federation) Étoile du Congo
2	DF	Gabriel Dengaki	7 November 1952 (aged 19)			(Congolese Football Federation) Étoile du Congo
5	DF	Jacques Yvon Ndolou (Captain)	3 May 1944 (aged 27)			(Congolese Football Federation) Inter Club Brazzaville
4	DF	Joseph Ngassaki	8 November 1941 (aged 30)			(Congolese Football Federation) CARA Brazzaville
3	DF	Alphonse Niangou				(Congolese Football Federation) Diables Noirs
8	DF	Gabriel Samba	1942 (aged 29 or 30)			(Congolese Football Federation) Diables Noirs
18	MF	Jean-Bertrand Balékita	6 January 1948 (aged 24)			(French Football Federation) SC Toulon
12	MF	Joseph Matongo				(Congolese Football Federation) Diables Noirs
	MF	Emmanuel Mayanda	18 February 1950 (aged 22)			(Congolese Football Federation) CARA Brazzaville
	MF	Paul Mbemba				(Congolese Football Federation) Inter Club Brazzaville
	MF	Félix Mfoutou				(Congolese Football Federation) Avenir du Rail Ouenzé
6	MF	Noël Minga	12 July 1947 (aged 24)			(Congolese Football Federation) Inter Club Brazzaville
20	FW	François M'Pelé	13 July 1947 (aged 24)			(French Football Federation) AC Ajaccio
7	FW	Jonas Bahamboula	2 February 1949 (aged 23)			(Congolese Football Federation) Diables Noirs
10	FW	Paul Moukila	6 June 1950 (aged 21)			(Congolese Football Federation) CARA Brazzaville
19	FW	Jean-Michel M'Bono	27 January 1946 (aged 26)			(Congolese Football Federation) Étoile du Congo
	FW	Augustin Ndouli				(Congolese Football Federation) Patronage Sainte-Anne
11	FW	Jean-Michel Ongagna				(Congolese Football Federation) Étoile du Congo
	FW	Gilbert Poaty				(Congolese Football Federation) Vita Club Mokanda

=== Morocco ===
Coach: (Spain) Sabino Barinaga

No.	Pos.	Player	Date of birth (age)	Caps	Goals	Club
	GK	Allal Benkassou	11 November 1941 (aged 30)			(Royal Moroccan Football Federation) FAR Rabat
	DF	Ahmed Najah	1947			(Royal Moroccan Football Federation) Raja Beni Mellal
	DF	Larbi Ihardane	6 June 1954 (aged 17)			(Royal Moroccan Football Federation) Wydad
	DF	Abdallah Lamrani	1946			(Royal Moroccan Football Federation) FAR Rabat
	DF	Boujemaa Benkhrif	1947			(Royal Moroccan Football Federation) Kénitra AC
	DF	Abdelkader El Khiati	1945			(Royal Moroccan Football Federation) FAR Rabat
	DF	Khalifa El-Bakhti	1950			(Royal Moroccan Football Federation) FAR Rabat
	MF	Larbi Chebbak	1946			(Royal Moroccan Football Federation) US Sidi Kacem
	MF	Mohamed Maaroufi	1 May 1949 (aged 22)			(French Football Federation) Nîmes
	MF	Maouhoub Ghazouani	1948			(Royal Moroccan Football Federation) FAR Rabat
	MF	Mustapha Choukri	1945			(Royal Moroccan Football Federation) Raja Casablanca
	FW	Abdallah Tazi	30 November 1944 (aged 27)			(Royal Moroccan Football Federation) Maghreb AS
	FW	Ahmed Faras	7 December 1946 (aged 25)			(Royal Moroccan Football Federation) Chabab Mohammedia
	FW	Mohamed El Filali	9 July 1945 (aged 26)			(Royal Moroccan Football Federation) MC Oujda
	FW	Redouane El Guezzar	1950			(Royal Moroccan Football Federation) Maghreb AS
		Abdelkader Ben Bouali				
		Khaled Khalifa				

=== Sudan ===
Coach: Abdel-Fattah Hamad Abu-Zeid

No.	Pos.	Player	Date of birth (age)	Caps	Goals	Club
	GK	Muhamed Abdelfatah Zughbir	1949			(Sudan Football Association) Al-Hilal Club
	GK	Sayed Amasri				(Sudan Football Association) Al-Merrikh SC
	DF	Alser Kaunda	1949			(Sudan Football Association) Al-Merreikh SC
	DF	Awad Koka	1947			(Sudan Football Association) Al-Hilal Club
	DF	Mahmoud James	1947			(Sudan Football Association) Al-Tahrir SC (Bahri)
	DF	Abdelgader Murjan				(Sudan Football Association) Al-Merrikh SC
	DF	Najmeldin Hassan (C)	1945			(Sudan Football Association) Al Neel SC (Khartoum)
	MF	Bushra Wahba	1 January 1943 (aged 29)			(Sudan Football Association) Al-Merreikh SC
	FW	Muhamed Hamouri				(Sudan Football Association) Al-Merreikh SC
	MF	Bushara Abdel-Nadief	1947			(Sudan Football Association) Al-Merreikh SC
	MF	Abdelkafi Abuelgasem				(Sudan Football Association) Burri
	FW	Muhsen Ataa	1948			(Sudan Football Association) Al-Merrikh SC
	FW	Hasabu El-Sagheer	1 July 1947 (aged 24)			(Sudan Football Association) Burri SC
	FW	Jadallah Kheirelseid				(Sudan Football Association) Al-Merreikh SC
	MF	Kamal Abdelwahab				(Sudan Football Association) Al-Merreikh SC
	FW	Muhamed Hussein Kassala				(Sudan Football Association) Al-Hilal Club

=== Zaire ===
Coach: Blagoje Vidinić (Socialist Federal Republic of Yugoslavia)

No.	Pos.	Player	Date of birth (age)	Caps	Goals	Club
	GK	Pombi Litinda				(Congolese Association Football Federation) AS Vita
	GK	Kazadi Mwamba	6 March 1947 (aged 24)			(Congolese Association Football Federation) TP Mazembe
	DF	Joseph Lungwila				
	DF	Bwanga Tshimen	4 January 1949 (aged 23)			(Congolese Association Football Federation) TP Mazembe
	DF	Mwanza Mukombo	17 December 1945 (aged 26)			(Congolese Association Football Federation) TP Mazembe
	DF	Julien Kialunda	24 April 1940 (aged 31)			(Royal Belgian Football Association) Anderlecht
	MF	Kidumu Mantantu	17 November 1946 (aged 25)			(Congolese Association Football Federation) CS Imana
	MF	Kilasu Massamba	22 December 1950 (aged 21)			(Congolese Association Football Federation) CS Imana
	MF	Léonard Saïdi	24 November 1941 (aged 30)			(Congolese Association Football Federation) TP Mazembe
	MF	Tshinabu Wa Munda	8 May 1946 (aged 25)			(Congolese Association Football Federation) TP Mazembe
	MF	Kafula Ngoie	11 November 1945 (aged 26)			(Congolese Association Football Federation) TP Mazembe
	MF	Benjamin Mutombo				
	FW	Mayanga Maku	31 October 1948 (aged 23)			(Congolese Association Football Federation) AS Vita
	FW	Kakoko Etepe	22 November 1950 (aged 21)			(Congolese Association Football Federation) CS Imana
	FW	Jean Kalala N'Tumba	7 January 1949 (aged 23)			(Congolese Association Football Federation) TV Tshipepele
