= Cameroon at the Africa Cup of Nations =

Cameroon's AFCON history, achievements, and memorable moments

Cameroon are one of Africa's major forces in the Africa Cup of Nations. Cameroon won its first tournament in 1984, Cameroon emerged and became a fearsome power of the tournament, winning the tournament again in 2000 and 2002.

The 2017 tournament was the last tournament to date Cameroon has won.

== Overall record ==
Africa Cup of Nations record
Year	Round	Position	Pld	W	D*	L	GF	GA
(Sudan) 1957	Part of France							
(United Arab Republic) 1959	Part of France							
(Ethiopia) 1962	Not affiliated to CAF							
(Ghana) 1963	Not affiliated to CAF							
(Tunisia) 1965	Did not enter							
(Ethiopia) 1968	Did not qualify							
(Sudan) 1970	Group stage	5th	3	2	0	1	7	5
(Cameroon) 1972	Third place	3rd	5	3	1	1	10	5
(Egypt) 1974	Did not qualify							
(Ethiopia) 1976	Did not qualify							
(Ghana) 1978	Did not qualify							
(Nigeria) 1980	Did not qualify							
(Libya) 1982	Group stage	5th	3	0	3	0	1	1
(Ivory Coast) 1984	Champions	1st	5	3	1	1	9	3
(Egypt) 1986	Runners-up	2nd	5	3	2	0	8	5
(Morocco) 1988	Champions	1st	5	3	2	0	4	1
(Algeria) 1990	Group stage	5th	3	1	0	2	2	3
(Senegal) 1992	Fourth place	4th	5	2	2	1	4	3
(Tunisia) 1994	Did not qualify							
(South Africa) 1996	Group stage	9th	3	1	1	1	5	7
(Burkina Faso) 1998	Quarter-finals	8th	4	2	1	1	5	4
(Ghana) (Nigeria) 2000	Champions	1st	6	3	2	1	11	5
(Mali) 2002	Champions	1st	6	5	1	0	9	0
(Tunisia) 2004	Quarter-finals	6th	4	1	2	1	7	6
(Egypt) 2006	Quarter-finals	5th	4	3	1	0	8	2
(Ghana) 2008	Runners-up	2nd	6	4	0	2	14	8
(Angola) 2010	Quarter-finals	7th	4	1	1	2	6	8
(Equatorial Guinea) (Gabon) 2012	Did not qualify							
(South Africa) 2013	Did not qualify							
(Equatorial Guinea) 2015	Group stage	13th	3	0	2	1	2	3
(Gabon) 2017	Champions	1st	6	3	3	0	7	3
(Egypt) 2019	Round of 16	13th	4	1	2	1	4	3
(Cameroon) 2021	Third place	3rd	7	4	3	0	14	7
(Ivory Coast) 2023	Round of 16	14th	4	1	1	2	5	8
(Morocco) 2025	Quarter-Finals	7th	5	3	1	1	6	5
(Kenya) (Tanzania) (Uganda) 2027	To be determined							
Total	5 Titles	22/35	100	49	32	19	148	95

*Denotes draws including knockout matches decided via penalty shoot-out.
**Red border colour indicates tournament was held on home soil.

== Participation history ==
=== Cameroon at the 1970 African Cup of Nations ===
Group A

Team	Pld	W	D	L	GF	GA	GD	Pts
Ivory Coast	3	2	0	1	9	4	+5	4
Sudan	3	2	0	1	5	2	+3	4
Cameroon	3	2	0	1	7	6	+1	4
Ethiopia	3	0	0	3	3	12	−9	0

6 February 1970

Cameroon	3–2	Ivory Coast
Koum 57', 66'; N'Doga 60'		Pokou 25', 45'

Municipal Stadium, Khartoum
Attendance: 14,464
Referee: Mahmoud (Egypt)
6 February 1970

Sudan	3–0	Ethiopia
Gagarin 43'; Hasabu El-Sagheer 47'; Jaksa 85'

Municipal Stadium, Khartoum
Attendance: 14,464
Referee: Faber (Guinea)

8 February 1970

Cameroon	3–2	Ethiopia
Tsébo 21'; Manga-Onguéné 43'; N'Doga 70'		Mengistu 12', 75'

Municipal Stadium, Khartoum
Attendance: 9,864
Referee: Quarshie (Ghana)
8 February 1970

Ivory Coast	1–0	Sudan
Tahi 89'

Municipal Stadium, Khartoum
Attendance: 9,864
Referee: Mahombé (Congo-Kinshasa)

10 February 1970

Ivory Coast	6–1	Ethiopia
Losseni 16'; Pokou 21', 60', 71', 80', 87'		Mengistu 33'

Municipal Stadium, Khartoum
Attendance: 9,770
Referee: Boukili (Morocco)
10 February 1970

Sudan	2–1	Cameroon
Jaksa 20'; Hasabu El-Sagheer 60'		Tsébo 34'

Municipal Stadium, Khartoum
Attendance: 9,770
Referee: Ngom (Senegal)

=== Cameroon at the 1972 African Cup of Nations ===
Group A

Team	Pld	W	D	L	GF	GA	GD	Pts
Cameroon	3	2	1	0	5	2	+3	5
Mali	3	0	3	0	5	5	0	3
Kenya	3	0	2	1	3	4	−1	2
Togo	3	0	2	1	4	6	−2	2

23 February 1972

Cameroon	2–1	Kenya
N'Doga 7'; N'Dongo 20'		Niva 44'

Stade Omnisports, Yaoundé
Referee: Abdelkader Ben Jelloun (Morocco)
24 February 1972

Mali	3–3	Togo
B Traoré 10'; F. Keita 46'; B. Touré 49'		Kaolo 45' (pen.), 60'; Adé 81'

Stade Omnisports, Yaoundé
Referee: Andre Bernard Ickias (Congo)

26 February 1972

Mali	1–1	Kenya
F. Keita 45'		Nicodémus 60'

Stade Omnisports, Yaoundé
Referee: Pierre Mutombo (Zaire)
26 February 1972

Cameroon	2–0	Togo
Maya 64'; Mvé 79'

Stade Omnisports, Yaoundé
Referee: Babikr Eissa (Sudan)

28 February 1972

Togo	1–1	Kenya
Kaolo 60'		Pelé Ouma 30'

Stade Omnisports, Yaoundé
Referee: Abdelkader Aouissi (Algeria)
28 February 1972

Cameroon	1–1	Mali
N'Doumbé 67'		F. Keita 43'

Stade Omnisports, Yaoundé
Referee: Mostafa Kamel (Egypt)

Semi-finals

2 March 1972

Cameroon	0–1	Congo
		Minga 31'

Stade Omnisports, Yaoundé
Referee: Mostafa Kamel (Egypt)

Third place match

4 March 1972

Cameroon	5–2	Zaire
Akono 4' (pen.); N'Dongo 31'; Owona 32'; Mouthé 34'; N'Doga 42'		Etepé 13'; Mayanga 17'

Stade Omnisports, Yaoundé
Referee: George Lamptey (Ghana)

=== Cameroon at the 1982 African Cup of Nations ===
Group A

Team	Pld	W	D	L	GF	GA	GD	Pts
Libya	3	1	2	0	4	2	+2	4
Ghana	3	1	2	0	3	2	+1	4
Cameroon	3	0	3	0	1	1	0	3
Tunisia	3	0	1	2	1	4	−3	1

5 March 1982

Libya	2–2	Ghana
Jaranah 58'; Al-Issawi 76'	Report	Alhassan 28'; Opoku Nti 89'

11 June Stadium, Tripoli
Attendance: 45,200
Referee: Sohan Ramlochun (Mauritius)

5 March 1982

Cameroon	1–1	Tunisia
M'Bida 61'	Report	Gabsi 60'

11 June Stadium, Tripoli
Attendance: 45,000
Referee: Bakary Sarr (Senegal)

9 March 1982

Cameroon	0–0	Ghana
	Report

11 June Stadium, Tripoli
Attendance: 40,000
Referee: Mohamed Larache (Morocco)

9 March 1982

Libya	2–0	Tunisia
Seddik 42' (o.g.); Al-Bor'osi 89'	Report

11 June Stadium, Tripoli
Attendance: 40,000
Referee: Kambaji Kabongo (Zaire)

12 March 1982

Ghana	1–0	Tunisia
John Ebow Essien 28'	Report

11 June Stadium, Tripoli
Attendance: 40,000
Referee: Idrissa Traoré (Mali)

12 March 1982

Libya	0–0	Cameroon
	Report

11 June Stadium, Tripoli
Attendance: 40,000
Referee: Babacar Fall (Senegal)

=== Cameroon at the 1984 African Cup of Nations ===
Group A

Team	Pld	W	D	L	GF	GA	GD	Pts
Egypt	3	2	1	0	3	1	+2	5
Cameroon	3	2	0	1	6	2	+4	4
Ivory Coast	3	1	0	2	4	4	0	2
Togo	3	0	1	2	1	7	−6	1

4 March 1984

Ivory Coast	3–0	Togo
Koffi 27'; Fofana 62'; Goba 75'	Report

Stade Félix Houphouët-Boigny, Abidjan
Attendance: 50,000
Referee: Ali Bennaceur (Tunisia)

4 March 1984

Egypt	1–0	Cameroon
Abouzaid 78'	Report

Stade Félix Houphouët-Boigny, Abidjan
Attendance: 50,000
Referee: Gebreyesus Tesfaye (Ethiopia)

7 March 1984

Cameroon	4–1	Togo
Djonkep 7'; Abega 21', 61'; Aoudou 45'	Report	Moutairou 56'

Stade Félix Houphouët-Boigny, Abidjan
Attendance: 15,000
Referee: Mulenga Rezzin (Zambia)

7 March 1984

Ivory Coast	1–2	Egypt
Miézan 53'	Report	Abouzaid 66', 72'

Stade Félix Houphouët-Boigny, Abidjan
Attendance: 40,000
Referee: Edwin Picon-Ackong (Mauritius)

10 March 1984

Egypt	0–0	Togo
	Report

Stade Félix Houphouët-Boigny, Abidjan
Attendance: 40,000
Referee: Frank Valdemarca (Zimbabwe)

10 March 1984

Ivory Coast	0–2	Cameroon
	Report	Milla 42'; Djonkep 61'

Stade Félix Houphouët-Boigny, Abidjan
Attendance: 40,000
Referee: Mohamed Larache (Morocco)

Semi-finals

14 March 1984

Algeria	0–0 (a.e.t.)	Cameroon
	Report
Penalties
Belloumi (penalty scored); Yahi (penalty scored); Kaci-Saïd (penalty scored); Guendouz (penalty missed); Madjer (penalty scored)	4–5	(penalty scored) Kundé; (penalty scored) Ebongué; (penalty scored) Aoudou; (penalty scored) Bell; (penalty scored) Ndoumbé

Stade Bouaké, Bouaké
Attendance: 15,000
Referee: Edwin Picon-Ackong (Mauritius)

Final

18 March 1984

Cameroon	3–1	Nigeria
N'Djeya 32'; Abega 79'; Ebongué 84'	Report	Lawal 10'

Stade Félix Houphouët-Boigny, Abidjan
Attendance: 27,456
Referee: Ali Bennaceur (Tunisia)

=== Cameroon at the 1986 African Cup of Nations ===
Group B

Team	Pld	W	D	L	GF	GA	GD	Pts
Cameroon	3	2	1	0	7	5	+2	5
Morocco	3	1	2	0	2	1	+1	4
Algeria	3	0	2	1	2	3	−1	2
Zambia	3	0	1	2	2	4	−2	1

8 March 1986

Algeria	0–0	Morocco
	Report

Alexandria Stadium, Alexandria
Attendance: 12,000
Referee: Ali Bennaceur (Tunisia)

8 March 1986

Cameroon	3–2	Zambia
Milla 46'; M'Fédé 67', 82' (pen.)	Report	Chabala 65'; Bwalya 77' (pen.)

Alexandria Stadium, Alexandria
Attendance: 20,000
Referee: Idrissa Traoré (Mali)

11 March 1986

Algeria	0–0	Zambia
	Report

Alexandria Stadium, Alexandria
Attendance: 4,000
Referee: Karim Camara (Guinea)

11 March 1986

Cameroon	1–1	Morocco
Milla 89'	Report	Krimau 63'

Alexandria Stadium, Alexandria
Attendance: 8,000
Referee: Frank Valdemarca (Zimbabwe)

14 March 1986

Morocco	1–0	Zambia
Chilengi 18' (o.g.)	Report

Alexandria Stadium, Alexandria
Attendance: 5,000
Referee: Simon Bantsimba (Congo)

14 March 1986

Cameroon	3–2	Algeria
Kana-Biyik 66', 70'; Milla 72'	Report	Madjer 61'; Maroc 73'

Alexandria Stadium, Alexandria
Attendance: 10,000
Referee: Badou Jasseh (Gambia)

Semi-finals

17 March 1986

Cameroon	1–0	Ivory Coast
Milla 46'	Report

Alexandria Stadium, Alexandria
Attendance: 12,000
Referee: Edwin Picon-Ackong (Mauritius)

Final

21 March 1986

Egypt	0–0	Cameroon
	Report
Penalties
Yehia (penalty scored); Abdelghani (penalty scored); Abdou (penalty missed); Mayhoub (penalty scored); Shehata (penalty scored); Kassem (penalty scored)	5–4	(penalty scored) M'Fédé; (penalty scored) Kundé; (penalty missed) M'Bida; (penalty scored) Milla; (penalty scored) Aoudou; (penalty missed) Kana-Biyik

Cairo International Stadium, Cairo
Attendance: 120,000
Referee: Ali Bennaceur (Tunisia)

=== Cameroon at the 1988 African Cup of Nations ===
Group B

Team	Pld	W	D	L	GF	GA	GD	Pts
Nigeria	3	1	2	0	4	1	+3	4
Cameroon	3	1	2	0	2	1	+1	4
Egypt	3	1	1	1	3	1	+2	3
Kenya	3	0	1	2	0	6	−6	1

14 March 1988

Cameroon	1–0	Egypt
Milla 5'	Report

Stade Moulay Abdellah, Rabat
Attendance: 5,000
Referee: Idrissa Traoré (Mali)

14 March 1988

Nigeria	3–0	Kenya
Yekini 6'; Edobor 13'; Okosieme 33'	Report

Stade Moulay Abdellah, Rabat
Attendance: 4,000
Referee: Badara Sène (Senegal)

17 March 1988

Cameroon	1–1	Nigeria
Milla 21'	Report	Okwaraji 2'

Stade Moulay Abdellah, Rabat
Attendance: 13,000
Referee: Bester Kalombo (Malawi)

17 March 1988

Egypt	3–0	Kenya
Abdelhamid 2', 65'; Younes 58'	Report

Stade Moulay Abdellah, Rabat
Attendance: 12,000
Referee: Simon Bantsimba (Congo)

20 March 1988

Cameroon	0–0	Kenya
	Report

Stade Moulay Abdellah, Rabat
Attendance: 25,000
Referee: Badou Jasseh (Gambia)

20 March 1988

Nigeria	0–0	Egypt
	Report

Stade Moulay Abdellah, Rabat
Attendance: 30,000
Referee: Ali Bangoura (Guinea)

Semi-finals

23 March 1988

Morocco	0–1	Cameroon
	Report	Makanaky 78'

Stade Mohamed V, Casablanca
Attendance: 45,000
Referee: Eganaden Cadressen (Mauritius)

Final

27 March 1988

Cameroon	1–0	Nigeria
Kundé 55' (pen.)	Report

Stade Mohamed V, Casablanca
Attendance: 50,000
Referee: Idrissa Sarr (Mauritania)

=== Cameroon at the 1990 African Cup of Nations ===
Group B

Team	Pld	W	D	L	GF	GA	GD	Pts
Zambia	3	2	1	0	2	0	+2	5
Senegal	3	1	2	0	2	0	+2	4
Cameroon	3	1	0	2	2	3	−1	2
Kenya	3	0	1	2	0	3	−3	1

3 March 1990

Zambia	1–0	Cameroon
Chikabala 58'	Report

Stade 19 Mai 1956, Annaba
Attendance: 8,000
Referee: Naji Jouini (Tunisia)

3 March 1990

Senegal	0–0	Kenya
	Report

Stade 19 Mai 1956, Annaba
Attendance: 13,000
Referee: Idrissa Traoré (Mali)

6 March 1990

Zambia	1–0	Kenya
Makwaza 40'	Report

Stade 19 Mai 1956, Annaba
Attendance: 6,000
Referee: Mawukpona Hounnake-Kouassi (Togo)

6 March 1990

Senegal	2–0	Cameroon
Diallo 45'; N'Dao 56'	Report

Stade 19 Mai 1956, Annaba
Attendance: 12,000
Referee: Jamal Al Sharif (Syria)

9 March 1990

Zambia	0–0	Senegal
	Report

Stade 19 Mai 1956, Annaba
Attendance: 10,000
Referee: Mohamed Hussam El-Dine (Egypt)

9 March 1990

Cameroon	2–0	Kenya
Maboang 28', 69'	Report

Stade 19 Mai 1956, Annaba
Attendance: 6,000
Referee: Badou Jasseh (Gambia)

=== Cameroon at the 1992 African Cup of Nations ===
Group B

Team	Pld	W	D	L	GF	GA	GD	Pts
Cameroon	2	1	1	0	2	1	+1	3
Zaire	2	0	2	0	2	2	0	2
Morocco	2	0	1	1	1	2	−1	1

12 January 1992

Cameroon	1–0	Morocco
Kana-Biyik 23'

Stade de l'Amitié, Dakar
Attendance: 60,000

14 January 1992

Morocco	1–1	Zaire
Rokbi 89'		Kona 90'

Stade de l'Amitié, Dakar
Attendance: 5,000

16 January 1992

Cameroon	1–1	Zaire
Omam-Biyik 15'		Tueba 1'

Stade de l'Amitié, Dakar
Attendance: 10,000

Quarter-finals

19 January 1992

Cameroon	1–0	Senegal
Ebongué 89'

Stade de l'Amitié, Dakar
Attendance: 35,000
Referee: Kiichiro Tachi (Japan)

Semi-finals

23 January 1992

Cameroon	0–0 (a.e.t.)	Ivory Coast
	Report
Penalties
Makanaky (penalty missed); Ebwelle (penalty scored); Omam-Biyik (penalty missed); Bell (penalty missed)	1–3	(penalty scored) Diaby; (penalty scored) M. Traoré; (penalty missed) Yago; (penalty scored) A. Traoré

Stade de l'Amitié, Dakar
Attendance: 35,000
Referee: Lim Kee Chong (Mauritius)

Third place play-off

25 January 1992

Nigeria	2–1	Cameroon
Ekpo 75'; Yekini 88'		Maboang 85'

Stade de l'Amitié, Dakar
Attendance: 2,000
Referee: Sinko Zeli (Ivory Coast)

=== Cameroon at the 1996 African Cup of Nations ===
Group A

Team	Pld	W	D	L	GF	GA	GD	Pts
South Africa	3	2	0	1	4	1	+3	6
Egypt	3	2	0	1	4	3	+1	6
Cameroon	3	1	1	1	5	7	−2	4
Angola	3	0	1	2	4	6	−2	1

13 January 1996

South Africa	3–0	Cameroon
Masinga 15'; Williams 37'; Moshoeu 55'

FNB Stadium, Johannesburg
Attendance: 75,000
Referee: Said Belqola (Morocco)

15 January 1996

Egypt	2–1	Angola
El-Kass 30', 33'		Quinzinho 77'

FNB Stadium, Johannesburg
Attendance: 6,000
Referee: Sidi Bekaye Magassa (Mali)

18 January 1996

Cameroon	2–1	Egypt
Omam-Biyik 36' (pen.); Tchami 59'		Maher 48'

FNB Stadium, Johannesburg
Attendance: 4,000
Referee: Lim Kee Chong (Mauritius)

20 January 1996

South Africa	1–0	Angola
Williams 57'

FNB Stadium, Johannesburg
Attendance: 28,000
Referee: Fethi Boucetta (Tunisia)

24 January 1996

South Africa	0–1	Egypt
		El-Kass 7'

FNB Stadium, Johannesburg
Attendance: 20,000
Referee: Lucien Bouchardeau (Niger)

24 January 1996

Angola	3–3	Cameroon
Joni 38' (pen.); Paulão 57'; Quinzinho 80'		Omam-Biyik 25'; Mouyeme 82'; Vicente 90' (o.g.)

Kings Park Stadium, Durban
Attendance: 6,000
Referee: Mohamed Kouradji (Algeria)

=== Cameroon at the 1998 African Cup of Nations ===
Group A

Team	Pld	W	D	L	GF	GA	GD	Pts
Cameroon	3	2	1	0	5	3	+2	7
Burkina Faso	3	2	0	1	3	2	+1	6
Guinea	3	1	1	1	3	3	0	4
Algeria	3	0	0	3	2	5	−3	0

7 February 1998
16:00

Burkina Faso	0–1	Cameroon
		Tchami 20'

Stade du 4 Août, Ouagadougou
Attendance: 30,000
Referee: Gamal Al-Ghandour (Egypt)

8 February 1998
20:30

Algeria	0–1	Guinea
		Oularé 19'

Stade Municipal, Ouagadougou
Attendance: 3,000
Referee: Lim Kee Chong (Mauritius)

11 February 1998
15:00

Cameroon	2–2	Guinea
Tchami 9'; Womé 44'		Oularé 46', 77'

Stade Municipal, Ouagadougou
Attendance: 2,000
Referee: Young-Joo Kim (South Korea)

11 February 1998
20:00

Burkina Faso	2–1	Algeria
K. Ouédraogo 65' (pen.); Traoré 77'		Saïb 82' (pen.)

Stade du 4 Août, Ouagadougou
Attendance: 35,000
Referee: Pierre Mounguegui (Gabon)

15 February 1998
16:00

Burkina Faso	1–0	Guinea
Kambou 85'

Stade du 4 Août, Ouagadougou
Attendance: 40,000
Referee: Omer Yengo (Congo)

15 February 1998
16:00

Cameroon	2–1	Algeria
Job 47'; Tchami 65'		Dziri 40'

Stade Municipal, Ouagadougou
Attendance: 1,000
Referee: Kine Tibebu (Ethiopia)

Quarter-finals

20 February 1998
16:00

Cameroon	0–1	DR Congo
	Report	Tondelua 30'

Stade Municipal, Bobo-Dioulasso
Attendance: 5,000
Referee: Abdul Rahman Al-Zaid (Saudi Arabia)

=== Cameroon at the 2000 African Cup of Nations ===
Group A

Group A of the 2000 AFCON remains as the only group stage that all four teams to achieve four points out of three matches.

Team	Pld	W	D	L	GF	GA	GD	Pts
Cameroon	3	1	1	1	4	2	+2	4
Ghana	3	1	1	1	3	3	0	4
Ivory Coast	3	1	1	1	3	4	−1	4
Togo	3	1	1	1	2	3	−1	4

22 January 2000
16:00

Ghana	1–1	Cameroon
Ayew 57'		Foé 19'

Accra Sports Stadium, Accra
Attendance: 45,000
Referee: Ali Bujsaim (United Arab Emirates)

24 January 2000
16:00

Ivory Coast	1–1	Togo
Guel 38' (pen.)		Ouadja 19'

Accra Sports Stadium, Accra
Attendance: 13,000
Referee: Tessema Hailemalak (Ethiopia)

27 January 2000
16:00

Ghana	2–0	Togo
Ayew 28'; Addo 37'

Accra Sports Stadium, Accra
Attendance: 30,000
Referee: Abderrahim Al-Arjoune (Morocco)

28 January 2000
19:45

Cameroon	3–0	Ivory Coast
Kalla 29'; Eto'o 45'; M'Boma 90'

Accra Sports Stadium, Accra
Attendance: 5,000
Referee: Mourad Daami (Tunisia)

31 January 2000
16:00

Ghana	0–2	Ivory Coast
		Kalou 45'; Sie 84'

Accra Sports Stadium, Accra
Attendance: 40,000
Referee: Gamal Al-Ghandour (Egypt)

31 January 2000
16:00

Cameroon	0–1	Togo
		Tchangai 18'

Baba Yara Stadium, Kumasi
Attendance: 2,000
Referee: Olufunmi Olaniyan (Nigeria)

Quarter-finals

6 February 2000
16:00

Cameroon	2–1	Algeria
Eto'o 7'; Foé 24'		Tasfaout 79'

Accra Sports Stadium, Accra
Attendance: 15,000
Referee: Falla N'Doye (Senegal)

Semi-finals

10 February 2000
18:30

Cameroon	3–0	Tunisia
M'Boma 49', 85'; Eto'o 81'

Accra Sports Stadium, Accra
Attendance: 6,000
Referee: Ali Bujsaim (United Arab Emirates)

Final

13 February 2000
16:00

Nigeria	2–2 (a.e.t.)	Cameroon
Chukwu 45'; Okocha 47'	Report	Eto'o 26'; M'Boma 31'
Penalties
Okocha (penalty scored); Okpara (penalty scored); Kanu (penalty missed); Ikpeba (penalty missed); Oliseh (penalty scored)	3–4	(penalty scored) M'Boma; (penalty scored) Wome; (penalty scored) Geremi; (penalty missed) Foé; (penalty scored) Song

National Stadium, Lagos
Attendance: 60,000
Referee: Mourad Daami (Tunisia)

=== Cameroon at the 2002 African Cup of Nations ===
Group C

Team	Pld	W	D	L	GF	GA	GD	Pts
Cameroon	3	3	0	0	5	0	+5	9
DR Congo	3	1	1	1	3	2	+1	4
Togo	3	0	2	1	0	3	−3	2
Ivory Coast	3	0	1	2	1	4	−3	1

20 January 2002
17:30

Cameroon	1–0	DR Congo
M'Boma 40'

Stade Babemba Traoré, Sikasso
Attendance: 15,000
Referee: Coffi Codjia (Benin)

21 January 2002
18:00

Togo	0–0	Ivory Coast

Stade Babemba Traoré, Sikasso
Attendance: 15,000
Referee: Chukwudi Chukwujekwu (Nigeria)

25 January 2002
17:30

Cameroon	1–0	Ivory Coast
M'Boma 85'

Stade Babemba Traoré, Sikasso
Attendance: 15,000
Referee: Gamal Al-Ghandour (Egypt)

26 January 2002
17:30

DR Congo	0–0	Togo

Stade Babemba Traoré, Sikasso
Attendance: 7,000
Referee: Hailemalak Tessema (Ethiopia)

29 January 2002
16:00

Cameroon	3–0	Togo
Mettomo 52'; Eto'o 80'; Olembé 89'

Stade Babemba Traoré, Sikasso
Attendance: 6,000
Referee: Petros Mathabela (South Africa)

29 January 2002
16:00

DR Congo	3–1	Ivory Coast
Yuvuladio 28'; Nonda 66'; Kimoto 81' (pen.)		Traoré 86'

Stade Abdoulaye Nakoro Cissoko, Kayes
Attendance: 12,000
Referee: Felix Tangawarima (Zimbabwe)

Quarter-finals

4 February 2002
16:00

Cameroon	1–0	Egypt
M'Boma 62'

Stade Babemba Traoré, Sikasso
Attendance: 15,000
Referee: Mourad Daami (Tunisia)

Semi-finals

7 February 2002
19:00

Mali	0–3	Cameroon
		Olembé 39', 45+1'; Foé 84'

Stade du 26 Mars, Bamako
Attendance: 50,000
Referee: Lim Kee Chong (Mauritius)

Final

10 February 2002
16:00

Senegal	0–0 (a.e.t.)	Cameroon
	Report
Penalties
Coly (penalty scored); Fadiga (penalty scored); Faye (penalty missed); Diouf (penalty missed); Cissé (penalty missed)	2–3	(penalty missed) Wome; (penalty scored) Suffo; (penalty scored) Lauren; (penalty scored) Geremi; (penalty missed) Song

Stade du 26 Mars, Bamako
Attendance: 50,000
Referee: Gamal Al-Ghandour (Egypt)

=== Cameroon at the 2004 African Cup of Nations ===
Group C

Pos	Team	Pld	W	D	L	GF	GA	GD	Pts	Qualification
1	Cameroon	3	1	2	0	6	4	+2	5	Advance to knockout stage
2	Algeria	3	1	1	1	4	4	0	4	Advance to knockout stage
3	Egypt	3	1	1	1	3	3	0	4	
4	Zimbabwe	3	1	0	2	6	8	−2	3	

25 January 2004
16:30

Zimbabwe	1–2	Egypt
P. Ndlovu 46'		T. Abdel Hamid 58'; Barakat 63'

Stade Taïeb El Mhiri, Sfax
Attendance: 22,000
Referee: Lassina Paré (Burkina Faso)

25 January 2004
19:00

Cameroon	1–1	Algeria
M'Boma 43'		Zafour 52'

Stade Olympique de Sousse, Sousse
Attendance: 20,000
Referee: Coffi Codjia (Benin)

29 January 2004
16:30

Cameroon	5–3	Zimbabwe
M'Boma 31', 44', 65'; M'Bami 40', 67'		P. Ndlovu 8', 47' (pen.); Nyandoro 89'

Stade Taïeb El Mhiri, Sfax
Attendance: 15,000
Referee: Abubakar Sharaf (Ivory Coast)

29 January 2004
19:00

Algeria	2–1	Egypt
Mamouni 13'; Achiou 86'		Belal 25'

Stade Olympique de Sousse, Sousse
Attendance: 15,000
Referee: Alain Hamer (Luxembourg)

3 February 2004
14:00

Cameroon	0–0	Egypt

Stade Mustapha Ben Jannet, Monastir
Attendance: 20,000
Referee: Ali Bujsaim (United Arab Emirates)

3 February 2004
14:00

Algeria	1–2	Zimbabwe
Achiou 73'		A. Ndlovu 65'; Lupahla 71'

Stade Olympique de Sousse, Sousse
Attendance: 10,000
Referee: Eddy Maillet (Seychelles)

Quarter-finals

8 February 2004
14:00

Cameroon	1–2	Nigeria
Eto'o 42'		Okocha 45'; Utaka 73'

Stade Mustapha Ben Jannet, Monastir
Attendance: 14,750
Referee: Mohamed Guezzaz (Morocco)

=== Cameroon at the 2006 African Cup of Nations ===
Group B

Team	Pld	W	D	L	GF	GA	GD	Pts
Cameroon	3	3	0	0	7	1	+6	9
DR Congo	3	1	1	1	2	2	0	4
Angola	3	1	1	1	4	5	−1	4
Togo	3	0	0	3	2	7	−5	0

21 January 2006
17:15

Cameroon	3–1	Angola
Eto'o 20', 39', 78'		Flávio 31' (pen.)

Cairo Military Academy Stadium, Cairo
Attendance: 8,000
Referee: Mohamed Guezzaz (Morocco)

21 January 2006
20:00

Togo	0–2	DR Congo
		Mputu 45'; LuaLua 64'

Cairo Military Academy Stadium, Cairo
Attendance: 6,000
Referee: Mourad Daami (Tunisia)

25 January 2006
17:15

Angola	0–0	DR Congo

Cairo Military Academy Stadium, Cairo
Attendance: 2,000
Referee: Badara Diatta (Senegal)

25 January 2006
20:00

Cameroon	2–0	Togo
Eto'o 68'; Meyong 85'

Cairo Military Academy Stadium, Cairo
Attendance: 3,000
Referee: Modou Sowe (Gambia)

29 January 2006
19:00

Angola	3–2	Togo
Flávio 9', 38'; Maurito 86'		Kader 24'; Mamam 67'

Cairo International Stadium, Cairo
Attendance: 4,000
Referee: Abderrahim Al-Arjoune (Morocco)

29 January 2006
19:00

Cameroon	2–0	DR Congo
Geremi 31'; Eto'o 33'

Cairo Military Academy Stadium, Cairo
Attendance: 5,000
Referee: Koman Coulibaly (Mali)

Quarter-finals

4 February 2006
19:00

Cameroon	1–1 (a.e.t.)	Ivory Coast
Meyong 95'	Report	B. Koné 92'
Penalties
Eto'o (penalty scored); Geremi (penalty scored); Atouba (penalty scored); Kome (penalty scored); Meyong (penalty scored); Makoun (penalty scored); Song (penalty scored); Saidou (penalty scored); Douala (penalty scored); Bikey (penalty scored); Hamidou (penalty scored); Eto'o (penalty missed)	11–12	(penalty scored) Drogba; (penalty scored) K. Touré; (penalty scored) B. Koné; (penalty scored) Faé; (penalty scored) A. Koné; (penalty scored) Kouassi; (penalty scored) Romaric; (penalty scored) Boka; (penalty scored) Zokora; (penalty scored) Zoro; (penalty scored) Tizié; (penalty scored) Drogba

Cairo Military Academy Stadium, Cairo
Attendance: 4,000
Referee: Mohamed Guezzaz (Morocco)

=== Cameroon at the 2008 African Cup of Nations ===
Group C

Team	Pld	W	D	L	GF	GA	GD	Pts	Qualification
Egypt	3	2	1	0	8	3	+5	7	Advanced to the quarter-finals
Cameroon	3	2	0	1	10	5	+5	6	Advanced to the quarter-finals
Zambia	3	1	1	1	5	6	−1	4	
Sudan	3	0	0	3	0	9	−9	0	

22 January 2008
17:00

Egypt	4–2	Cameroon
Hosny 14' (pen.), 82'; Zidan 17', 45'	Report	Eto'o 51', 90' (pen.)

Baba Yara Stadium, Kumasi
Attendance: 42,000
Referee: Modou Sowe (Gambia)

22 January 2008
19:30

Sudan	0–3	Zambia
	Report	Chamanga 2'; J. Mulenga 50'; F. Katongo 59'

Baba Yara Stadium, Kumasi
Attendance: 35,000
Referee: Badara Diatta (Senegal)

26 January 2008
17:00

Cameroon	5–1	Zambia
Geremi 28'; Job 32', 82'; Emana 44'; Eto'o 66' (pen.)	Report	C. Katongo 90'

Baba Yara Stadium, Kumasi
Attendance: 10,000
Referee: Yuichi Nishimura (Japan)

26 January 2008
19:30

Egypt	3–0	Sudan
Hosny 29' (pen.); Aboutrika 78', 83'	Report

Baba Yara Stadium, Kumasi
Attendance: 15,000
Referee: Coffi Codjia (Benin)

30 January 2008
17:00

Cameroon	3–0	Sudan
Eto'o 27' (pen.), 90'; El Khider 33' (o.g.)	Report

Tamale Stadium, Tamale
Attendance: 10,000
Referee: Kokou Djaoupe (Togo)

30 January 2008
17:00

Egypt	1–1	Zambia
Zaki 15'	Report	C. Katongo 88'

Baba Yara Stadium, Kumasi
Attendance: 2,000
Referee: Koman Coulibaly (Mali)

Quarter-finals

4 February 2008
20:30

Tunisia	2–3 (a.e.t.)	Cameroon
Ben Saada 34'; Chikhaoui 81'	Report	Mbia 18', 93'; Geremi 27'

Tamale Stadium, Tamale
Attendance: 15,000
Referee: Koman Coulibaly (Mali)

Semi-finals

7 February 2008
17:00

Ghana	0–1	Cameroon
	Report	N'Kong 72'

Ohene Djan Stadium, Accra
Attendance: 40,000
Referee: Abderahim El Arjoune (Morocco)

Final

10 February 2008
17:00

Cameroon	0–1	Egypt
		Aboutrika 76'

Ohene Djan Stadium, Accra
Attendance: 35,500
Referee: Coffi Codjia (Benin)

=== Cameroon at the 2010 African Cup of Nations ===
Group D

Pos	Team	Pld	W	D	L	GF	GA	GD	Pts	Qualification
1	Zambia	3	1	1	1	5	5	0	4 (Note: The tie-breaking criteria for teams level on points consider only the results of matches between those teams (in this case, this excludes their results against Tunisia). All three teams were level on points and goal difference, and were ranked based on goals scored: Zambia 4, Cameroon 3, Gabon 2.)	Advance to knockout stage
2	Cameroon	3	1	1	1	5	5	0	4	Advance to knockout stage
3	Gabon	3	1	1	1	2	2	0	4	
4	Tunisia	3	0	3	0	3	3	0	3	

Source: CAF
Notes:
13 January 2010
17:00

Cameroon	0–1	Gabon
	Report	Cousin 17'

Estádio Alto da Chela, Lubango
Attendance: 15,000
Referee: Daniel Bennett (South Africa)
13 January 2010
19:30

Zambia	1–1	Tunisia
J. Mulenga 19'	Report	Dhaouadi 40'

Estádio Alto da Chela, Lubango
Attendance: 17,000
Referee: Koman Coulibaly (Mali)
17 January 2010
17:00

Gabon	0–0	Tunisia
	Report

Estádio Alto da Chela, Lubango
Attendance: 16,000
Referee: Coffi Codjia (Benin)
17 January 2010
19:30

Cameroon	3–2	Zambia
Geremi 68'; Eto'o 72'; Idrissou 86'	Report	J. Mulenga 8'; C. Katongo 81' (pen.)

Estádio Alto da Chela, Lubango
Attendance: 15,000
Referee: Khalil Al Ghamdi (Saudi Arabia)
21 January 2010
17:00

Gabon	1–2	Zambia
F. Do Marcolino 83'	Report	Kalaba 28'; Chamanga 62'

Complexo da Sr. da Graça, Benguela
Attendance: 5,000
Referee: Mohamed Benouza (Algeria)
21 January 2010
17:00

Cameroon	2–2	Tunisia
Eto'o 47'; N'Guémo 64'	Report	Chermiti 1'; Chedjou 63' (o.g.)

Estádio Alto da Chela, Lubango
Attendance: 19,000
Referee: Noumandiez Désiré Doué (Ivory Coast)
13 January 2010
17:00

Cameroon	0–1	Gabon
	Report	Cousin 17'

Estádio Nacional da Tundavala, Lubango
Attendance: 15,000
Referee: Daniel Bennett (South Africa)

13 January 2010
19:30

Zambia	1–1	Tunisia
J. Mulenga 19'	Report	Dhaouadi 40'

Estádio Nacional da Tundavala, Lubango
Attendance: 17,000
Referee: Koman Coulibaly (Mali)

17 January 2010
17:00

Gabon	0–0	Tunisia
	Report

Estádio Nacional da Tundavala, Lubango
Attendance: 16,000
Referee: Coffi Codjia (Benin)

17 January 2010
19:30

Cameroon	3–2	Zambia
Geremi 68'; Eto'o 72'; Idrissou 86'	Report	J. Mulenga 8'; C. Katongo 81' (pen.)

Estádio Nacional da Tundavala, Lubango
Attendance: 15,000
Referee: Khalil Al Ghamdi (Saudi Arabia)

21 January 2010
17:00

Gabon	1–2	Zambia
F. Do Marcolino 83'	Report	Kalaba 28'; Chamanga 62'

Estádio Nacional de Ombaka, Benguela
Attendance: 11,065
Referee: Mohamed Benouza (Algeria)

21 January 2010
17:00

Cameroon	2–2	Tunisia
Eto'o 47'; N'Guémo 64'	Report	Chermiti 1'; Chedjou 63' (o.g.)

Estádio Nacional da Tundavala, Lubango
Attendance: 19,000
Referee: Noumandiez Doué (Ivory Coast)

Quarter-finals

25 January 2010
17:00

Egypt	3–1 (a.e.t.)	Cameroon
Hassan 37', 104'; Gedo 92'	Report	Emaná 25'

Estádio Nacional de Ombaka, Benguela
Attendance: 12,000
Referee: Jerome Damon (South Africa)

=== Cameroon at the 2015 African Cup of Nations ===
Group D

Guinea and Mali finished level on the second spot after the group stage, making the first drawing of lots needed at the tournament since 1988. Unlike some other international tournaments, 2015 Africa Cup of Nations tournament regulations would not use fair-play criteria or a penalty shoot-out after the teams met on the last match day to determine the final group ranking. Both head coaches have openly criticised the regulations.

Pos	Team	Pld	W	D	L	GF	GA	GD	Pts	Qualification
1	Ivory Coast	3	1	2	0	3	2	+1	5	Advance to knockout stage
2	Guinea	3	0	3	0	3	3	0	3 (Note: Guinea and Mali were tied on head-to-head record, overall goal difference, and overall goals scored. A drawing of lots took place on 29 January 2015, 16:00 local time at the Hilton Malabo. Guinea selected the lot for 2nd place and advanced to the quarter-finals as the group runner-up.)	Advance to knockout stage
3	Mali	3	0	3	0	3	3	0	3	
4	Cameroon	3	0	2	1	2	3	−1	2	

Source: CAF
Rules for classification: Tiebreakers
Notes:
20 January 2015
17:00

Ivory Coast	1–1	Guinea
Doumbia 72'	Report	M. Yattara 36'

Estadio de Malabo, Malabo
Attendance: 14,875
Referee: Mehdi Abid Charef (Algeria)
20 January 2015
20:00

Mali	1–1	Cameroon
S. Yatabaré 71'	Report	Oyongo 84'

Estadio de Malabo, Malabo
Attendance: 15,000
Referee: Janny Sikazwe (Zambia)
24 January 2015
17:00

Ivory Coast	1–1	Mali
Gradel 86'	Report	Sako 7'

Estadio de Malabo, Malabo
Attendance: 14,890
Referee: Bouchaïb El Ahrach (Morocco)
24 January 2015
20:00

Cameroon	1–1	Guinea
Moukandjo 13'	Report	Traoré 42'

Estadio de Malabo, Malabo
Attendance: 15,000
Referee: Tessema Bamlak (Ethiopia)
28 January 2015
19:00

Cameroon	0–1	Ivory Coast
	Report	Gradel 35'

Estadio de Malabo, Malabo
Attendance: 15,230
Referee: Eric Otogo-Castane (Gabon)
28 January 2015
19:00

Guinea	1–1	Mali
Constant 15' (pen.)	Report	Maïga 47'

Estadio de Mongomo, Mongomo
Attendance: 13,470
Referee: Mohamed Said Kordi (Tunisia)

20 January 2015
Ivory Coast	1–1	Guinea	Estadio de Malabo, Malabo
Mali	1–1	Cameroon	Estadio de Malabo, Malabo
24 January 2015
Ivory Coast	1–1	Mali	Estadio de Malabo, Malabo
Cameroon	1–1	Guinea	Estadio de Malabo, Malabo
28 January 2015
Cameroon	0–1	Ivory Coast	Estadio de Malabo, Malabo
Guinea	1–1	Mali	Estadio de Mongomo, Mongomo

=== Cameroon at the 2017 African Cup of Nations ===
Group A

Pos	Team	Pld	W	D	L	GF	GA	GD	Pts	Qualification
1	Burkina Faso	3	1	2	0	4	2	+2	5	Advance to knockout stage
2	Cameroon	3	1	2	0	3	2	+1	5	Advance to knockout stage
3	Gabon (H)	3	0	3	0	2	2	0	3	
4	Guinea-Bissau	3	0	1	2	2	5	−3	1	

Source: CAF
(H) Hosts
14 January 2017
17:00

Gabon	1–1	Guinea-Bissau
Aubameyang 52'	Report	Juary 90+1'

Stade de l'Amitié, Libreville
Attendance: 39,230
Referee: Gehad Grisha (Egypt)
14 January 2017
20:00

Burkina Faso	1–1	Cameroon
Dayo 75'	Report	Moukandjo 35'

Stade de l'Amitié, Libreville
Referee: Janny Sikazwe (Zambia)

18 January 2017
17:00

Gabon	1–1	Burkina Faso
Aubameyang 38' (pen.)	Report	Nakoulma 23'

Stade de l'Amitié, Libreville
Referee: Bakary Gassama (Gambia)
18 January 2017
20:00

Cameroon	2–1	Guinea-Bissau
Siani 61'; Ngadeu-Ngadjui 78'	Report	Piqueti 13'

Stade de l'Amitié, Libreville
Referee: Youssef Essrayri (Tunisia)

22 January 2017
20:00

Cameroon	0–0	Gabon
	Report

Stade de l'Amitié, Libreville
Referee: Daniel Bennett (South Africa)
22 January 2017
20:00

Guinea-Bissau	0–2	Burkina Faso
	Report	Rudinilson 12' (o.g.); B. Traoré 58'

Stade de Franceville, Franceville
Referee: Bamlak Tessema Weyesa (Ethiopia)

Quarter-finals

28 January 2017
20:00

Senegal	0–0 (a.e.t.)	Cameroon
	Report
Penalties
Koulibaly (penalty scored); Mbodji (penalty scored); Sow (penalty scored); Saivet (penalty scored); Mané (penalty missed)	4–5	(penalty scored) Moukandjo; (penalty scored) Oyongo; (penalty scored) Teikeu; (penalty scored) Zoua; (penalty scored) Aboubakar

Stade de Franceville, Franceville
Referee: Janny Sikazwe (Zambia)

Semi-finals

2 February 2017
20:00

Cameroon	2–0	Ghana
Ngadeu-Ngadjui 72'; Bassogog 90+3'	Report

Stade de Franceville, Franceville
Referee: Bakary Gassama (Gambia)

Final

5 February 2017
20:00

Egypt	1–2	Cameroon
Elneny 22'	Report	Nkoulou 59'; Aboubakar 88'

Stade de l'Amitié, Libreville
Attendance: 38,250
Referee: Janny Sikazwe (Zambia)

=== Cameroon at the 2019 African Cup of Nations ===
Group F

Pos	Team	Pld	W	D	L	GF	GA	GD	Pts	Qualification
1	Ghana	3	1	2	0	4	2	+2	5	Advance to knockout stage
2	Cameroon	3	1	2	0	2	0	+2	5	Advance to knockout stage
3	Benin	3	0	3	0	2	2	0	3	Advance to knockout stage
4	Guinea-Bissau	3	0	1	2	0	4	−4	1	

Source: CAF
25 June 2019
19:00

Cameroon	2–0	Guinea-Bissau
Yaya 66'; Bahoken 69'	Report

Ismailia Stadium, Ismailia
Attendance: 5,983
Referee: Noureddine El Jaafari (Morocco)
25 June 2019
22:00

Ghana	2–2	Benin
A. Ayew 9'; J. Ayew 42'	Report	Poté 2', 63'

Ismailia Stadium, Ismailia
Attendance: 8,094
Referee: Youssef Essrayri (Tunisia)

29 June 2019
19:00

Cameroon	0–0	Ghana
	Report

Ismailia Stadium, Ismailia
Attendance: 16,724
Referee: Bamlak Tessema Weyesa (Ethiopia)
29 June 2019
22:00

Benin	0–0	Guinea-Bissau
	Report

Ismailia Stadium, Ismailia
Attendance: 9,212
Referee: Pacifique Ndabihawenimana (Burundi)

2 July 2019
18:00

Benin	0–0	Cameroon
	Report

Ismailia Stadium, Ismailia
Attendance: 14,120
Referee: Sadok Selmi (Tunisia)
2 July 2019
18:00

Guinea-Bissau	0–2	Ghana
	Report	J. Ayew 46'; Partey 72'

Suez Stadium, Suez
Attendance: 6,905
Referee: Eric Otogo-Castane (Gabon)

Round of 16

6 July 2019
18:00

Nigeria	3–2	Cameroon
Ighalo 19', 63'; Iwobi 66'	Report	Bahoken 41'; N'Jie 44'

Alexandria Stadium, Alexandria
Attendance: 10,000
Referee: Joshua Bondo (Botswana)

=== Cameroon at the 2021 African Cup of Nations ===
Group A

Pos	Team	Pld	W	D	L	GF	GA	GD	Pts	Qualification
1	Cameroon (H)	3	2	1	0	7	3	+4	7	Advance to knockout stage
2	Burkina Faso	3	1	1	1	3	3	0	4 (Note: Head-to-head result: Cape Verde 0–1 Burkina Faso.)	Advance to knockout stage
3	Cape Verde	3	1	1	1	2	2	0	4	Advance to knockout stage
4	Ethiopia	3	0	1	2	2	6	−4	1	

Source: CAF
(H) Hosts
Notes:
9 January 2022
17:00

Cameroon	2–1	Burkina Faso
Aboubakar 40' (pen.), 45+3' (pen.)	Report	Sangaré 24'

Olembe Stadium, Yaoundé
Referee: Mustapha Ghorbal (Algeria)

13 January 2022
17:00

Cameroon	4–1	Ethiopia
Toko Ekambi 8', 68'; Aboubakar 53', 55'	Report	Hotessa 4'

Olembe Stadium, Yaoundé
Referee: Jean-Jacques Ndala (DR Congo)

17 January 2022
17:00

Cape Verde	1–1	Cameroon
Rodrigues 53'	Report	Aboubakar 39'

Olembe Stadium, Yaoundé
Referee: Sadok Selmi (Tunisia)

Round of 16

24 January 2022
20:00

Cameroon	2–1	Comoros
Toko Ekambi 29'; Aboubakar 70'	Report	Y. M'Changama 81'

Olembe Stadium, Yaoundé
Referee: Bamlak Tessema Weyesa (Ethiopia)

Quarter-finals

29 January 2022
17:00

Gambia	0–2	Cameroon
	Report	Toko Ekambi 50', 57'

Japoma Stadium, Douala
Attendance: 36,259
Referee: Pacifique Ndabihawenimana (Burundi)

Semi-finals

3 February 2022
20:00

Cameroon	0–0 (a.e.t.)	Egypt
	Report
Penalties
Aboubakar (penalty scored); Moukoudi (penalty missed); Léa Siliki (penalty missed); N'Jie (penalty missed)	1–3	(penalty scored) Zizo; (penalty scored) Abdelmonem; (penalty scored) Lasheen

Olembe Stadium, Yaoundé
Attendance: 24,371
Referee: Bakary Gassama (Gambia)

Third place play-off

5 February 2022
20:00 (Note: The match was originally due to be held on 6 February 2022 at 17:00, but was rescheduled due to security and convenience reasons.)

Burkina Faso	3–3	Cameroon
Yago 24'; A. Onana 43' (o.g.); Dj. Ouattara 49'	Report	Bahoken 71'; Aboubakar 85', 87'
Penalties
Kaboré (penalty scored); S. Ouattara (penalty scored); Touré (penalty missed); Yago (penalty scored)	3–5	(penalty scored) Aboubakar; (penalty scored) Ngamaleu; (penalty scored) Toko Ekambi; (penalty scored) Kunde; (penalty scored) Oyongo

Ahmadou Ahidjo Stadium, Yaoundé
Referee: Redouane Jiyed (Morocco)

=== Cameroon at the 2023 African Cup of Nations ===
Group C

Pos	Team	Pld	W	D	L	GF	GA	GD	Pts	Qualification
1	Senegal	3	3	0	0	8	1	+7	9	Advance to knockout stage
2	Cameroon	3	1	1	1	5	6	−1	4 (Note: Tied on head-to-head points and overall goal difference. Overall goals scored: Cameroon 5, Guinea 2.)	Advance to knockout stage
3	Guinea	3	1	1	1	2	3	−1	4	Advance to knockout stage
4	Gambia	3	0	0	3	2	7	−5	0	

Source: CAF
Notes:
15 January 2024
17:00

Cameroon	1–1	Guinea
Magri 51'	Report	Bayo 10'

Charles Konan Banny Stadium, Yamoussoukro
Attendance: 11,271
Referee: Ibrahim Mutaz (Libya)

19 January 2024
17:00

Senegal	3–1	Cameroon
I. Sarr 16'; H. Diallo 71'; Mané 90+5'	Report	Castelletto 83'

Charles Konan Banny Stadium, Yamoussoukro
Attendance: 19,176
Referee: Mahmood Ismail (Sudan)

23 January 2024
17:00

Gambia	2–3	Cameroon
Jallow 72'; E. Colley 85'	Report	Toko Ekambi 56'; Gomez 87' (o.g.); Wooh 90+1'

Stade de la Paix, Bouaké
Attendance: 24,172
Referee: Bamlak Tessema Weyesa (Ethiopia)

Round of 16

27 January 2024
20:00

Nigeria	2–0	Cameroon
Lookman 36', 90'	Report

Felix Houphouet Boigny Stadium, Abidjan
Attendance: 22,085
Referee: Redouane Jiyed (Morocco)

=== Cameroon at the 2025 African Cup of Nations ===
Group A

Pos	Team	Pld	W	D	L	GF	GA	GD	Pts	Qualification
1	Ivory Coast	3	2	1	0	5	3	+2	7	Advance to knockout stage
2	Cameroon	3	2	1	0	4	2	+2	7	Advance to knockout stage
3	Mozambique	3	1	0	2	4	5	−1	3	Advance to knockout stage
4	Gabon	3	0	0	3	4	7	−3	0	

Source: CAF
24 December 2025
21:00

Cameroon	1–0	Gabon
Etta Eyong 6'	Report

Adrar Stadium, Agadir
Attendance: 35,200
Referee: Amin Mohamed Omar (Egypt)

28 December 2025
21:00

Ivory Coast	1–1	Cameroon
Diallo 51'	Report	Konan 56' (o.g.)

Marrakesh Stadium, Marrakesh
Attendance: 35,165
Referee: Mustapha Ghorbal (Algeria)

4

31 December 2025
20:00

Mozambique	1–2	Cameroon
Catamo 23'	Report	Nené 28' (o.g.); Kofane 55'

Adrar Stadium, Agadir
Attendance: 13,093
Referee: Jalal Jayed (Morocco)

Round of 16

4 January 2026
20:00

South Africa	1–2	Cameroon
Makgopa 88'	Report	Tchamadeu 34'; Kofane 47'

Al Medina Stadium, Rabat
Attendance: 14,127
Referee: Peter Waweru (Kenya)

Quarter-finals

9 January 2026
20:00

Cameroon	0–2	Morocco
	Report	Brahim 26'; Saibari 74'

Prince Moulay Abdellah Stadium, Rabat
Attendance: 64,178
Referee: Dahane Beida (Mauritania)

== See also ==
- Cameroon at the FIFA Confederations Cup
- Cameroon at the FIFA World Cup
