= 1972 African Cup of Nations final =

- Event: 1972 African Cup of Nations
Congo	Mali
(Republic of the Congo)	(Mali)
3	2
- Date: 5 March 1972
- Venue: Stade Omnisports, Yaoundé
- Referee: Abdelkader Aouissi (Algeria)
- Attendance: 40,000

The 1972 African Cup of Nations final was a football match that took place on 5 March 1972, at the Stade Omnisports in Yaoundé, Cameroon, to determine the winner of the 1972 African Cup of Nations. Congo defeated Mali 3–2 with two goals from M'Bono and a goal from M'Pelé, against one goal from Diakhité and another from M. Traoré to win their first African Cup.

== Road to the final ==
Congo		Mali	
Opponents	Results	Opponents	Results
Group stage
Morocco	1–1	Togo	3–3
Zaire	0–2	Kenya	1–1
Sudan	4–2	Cameroon	1–1
Semi-finals
Cameroon	1–0	Zaire	4–3 (a.e.t.)

== Match ==
=== Details ===
5 March 1972
--:-- UTC+1

Congo	3–2	Mali
M'Bono 57', 59'; M'Pelé 63'	Report	Diakhité 42'; M. Traoré 75'

Stade Omnisports, Yaoundé
Attendance: 40,000
Referee: Abdelkader Aouissi (Algeria)

Congo	Mali

GK	1	Maxime Matsima
DF	2	Gabriel Dengaki
DF	3	Alphonse Niangou
DF	4	Joseph Ngassaki
DF	5	Jacques Yvon Ndolou (c)
MF	18	Jean-Bertrand Balékita
MF	6	Noël Minga-Tchibinda
MF	12	Joseph Matongo	(substituted off) 77'
MF	9	Paul Mbemba
FW	10	Paul Moukila	(substituted off) 48'
FW	20	François M'Pelé
Substitutions:
FW	19	Jean-Michel M'Bono	(substituted on) 48'
FW	11	Jean-Michel Ongagna	(substituted on) 77'
Manager:
(Republic of the Congo) Adolphe "Amoyen" Bibandzoulou

GK	1	Mamadou Keïta
DF	4	Kidian Diallo
DF	12	Moctar Maïga
DF	3	Cheick Sangaré
DF	5	Checkna Traoré (c)
MF	6	Boubacar Traoré
MF	8	Ousmane Traoré
MF		Cheickna Traoré
MF		Boubacar Traoré
FW	10	Salif Keïta	(substituted off) 71'
FW	16	Bako Touré	(substituted off) 46'
Substitutions:
FW	19	Moussa Traoré	(substituted on) 46'
MF	18	Adama Traoré	(substituted on) 71'
Manager:
(Germany) Karl-Heinz Weigang

Assistant referees:
...
...
