= Sudan at the Africa Cup of Nations =

Sudan is one of the first countries to participate in the Africa Cup of Nations, and was also the first host country, when Sudan hosted it in 1957. During 1950s to 1970s, Sudan was one of Africa's best teams, and had won the tournament in the 1970 also held at home just after Gaafar Nimeiry's coup, with its greatest striker being Mustafa Azhari Alawad. However, after 1970, with Mustafa's retirement, the Sudanese team began to suffer a long decline and Sudan would lose status as a major African power to the hand of other African teams. Overall, Sudan had to wait for 32 years after qualifying to the 1976 Africa Cup of Nations to make its return in the 2008 Africa Cup of Nations, where it finished bottom with three straight 0–3 losses. Sudan would soon manage its best performance up to date in 2012 Africa Cup of Nations, reaching the quarter-finals in modern era, before suffers tremendous crisis that continue to hinder the growth of Sudanese football.

== Overall record ==
Africa Cup of Nations record
Appearances: 10
| Year | Round | Position | Pld | W | D | L | GF | GA |
|---|---|---|---|---|---|---|---|---|
| (Sudan) 1957 | Third place | 3rd | 1 | 0 | 0 | 1 | 1 | 2 |
| (United Arab Republic) 1959 | Runners-up | 2nd | 2 | 1 | 0 | 1 | 2 | 2 |
| (Ethiopia) 1962 | Did not qualify | | | | | | | |
| (Ghana) 1963 | Runners-up | 2nd | 3 | 1 | 1 | 1 | 6 | 5 |
| (Tunisia) 1965 | Did not qualify | | | | | | | |
| (Ethiopia) 1968 | Did not qualify | | | | | | | |
| (Sudan) 1970 | Champions | 1st | 5 | 4 | 0 | 1 | 8 | 3 |
| (Cameroon) 1972 | Group stage | 7th | 3 | 0 | 2 | 1 | 4 | 6 |
| (Egypt) 1974 | Did not qualify | | | | | | | |
| (Ethiopia) 1976 | Group stage | 7th | 3 | 0 | 2 | 1 | 3 | 4 |
| (Ghana) 1978 | Withdrew | | | | | | | |
| (Nigeria) 1980 | Did not qualify | | | | | | | |
| (Libya) 1982 | Did not enter | | | | | | | |
| (Ivory Coast) 1984 | Did not qualify | | | | | | | |
| (Egypt) 1986 | Withdrew | | | | | | | |
| (Morocco) 1988 | Did not qualify | | | | | | | |
| (Algeria) 1990 | Did not qualify | | | | | | | |
| (Senegal) 1992 | Did not qualify | | | | | | | |
| (Tunisia) 1994 | Did not qualify | | | | | | | |
| (South Africa) 1996 | Did not qualify | | | | | | | |
| (Burkina Faso) 1998 | Withdrew during qualifying | | | | | | | |
| (Ghana) (Nigeria) 2000 | Did not enter | | | | | | | |
| (Mali) 2002 | Did not qualify | | | | | | | |
| (Tunisia) 2004 | Did not qualify | | | | | | | |
| (Egypt) 2006 | Did not qualify | | | | | | | |
| (Ghana) 2008 | Group stage | 16th | 3 | 0 | 0 | 3 | 0 | 9 |
| (Angola) 2010 | Did not qualify | | | | | | | |
| (Gabon) (Equatorial Guinea) 2012 | Quarter-finals | 8th | 4 | 1 | 1 | 2 | 4 | 7 |
| (South Africa) 2013 | Did not qualify | | | | | | | |
| (Equatorial Guinea) 2015 | Did not qualify | | | | | | | |
| (Gabon) 2017 | Did not qualify | | | | | | | |
| (Egypt) 2019 | Did not qualify | | | | | | | |
| (Cameroon) 2021 | Group stage | 20th | 3 | 0 | 1 | 2 | 1 | 4 |
| (Ivory Coast) 2023 | Did not qualify | | | | | | | |
| (Morocco) 2025 | Qualified | | | | | | | |
| (Kenya) (Tanzania) (Uganda) 2027 | To be determined | | | | | | | |
| Total | 1 Title | 10/35 | 27 | 7 | 7 | 13 | 29 | 42 |

== Tournaments ==
| AFCON edition | Date | Location | Stage | Opponent | Result | Sudan scorers | Opponent scorers |
| (Sudan) 1957 | 10 February 1957 | Khartoum | Semi-finals | Egypt | 1–2 | Boraî Bashir | Raafat Attia; Ad-Diba |
| (United Arab Republic) 1959 | 25 May 1959 | Cairo | Final tournament | Ethiopia | 1–0 | Abdul Muttalib Naser |
| (United Arab Republic) 1959 | 29 May 1959 | Cairo | Final tournament | United Arab Republic | 1–2 | Siddiq Manzul | Essam Baheeg (x2) |
| (Ghana) 1963 | 26 November 1963 | Kumasi | Group stage | United Arab Republic | 2–2 | Nasr El-Din Abbas (x2) | Hassan El-Shazly; Mohamed Morsi Hussein |
| (Ghana) 1963 | 28 November 1963 | Kumasi | Group stage | Nigeria | 4–0 | Nasr El-Din Abbas (x2); Ibrahim Yahia El-Kuwarti; Abdel-Aziz Ibrahim |
| (Ghana) 1963 | 1 December 1963 | Accra | Final | Ghana | 0–3 | | Edward Aggrey-Fynn; Edward Acquah (x2) |
| (Sudan) 1970 | 6 February 1970 | Khartoum | Group stage | Ethiopia | 3–0 | Ali Gagarin; Omar Ali Hasab El-Rasoul; Nasr El-Din Abbas |
| (Sudan) 1970 | 8 February 1970 | Khartoum | Group stage | Ivory Coast | 0–1 | | François Tahi |
| (Sudan) 1970 | 10 February 1970 | Khartoum | Group stage | Cameroon | 2–1 | Nasr El-Din Abbas; Omar Ali Hasab El-Rasoul | Jean-Marie Tsébo |
| (Sudan) 1970 | 14 February 1970 | Khartoum | Semi-finals | United Arab Republic | 2–1 (a.e.t.) | Ahmed Mohamed El-Bashir (x2) | Hassan El-Shazly |
| (Sudan) 1970 | 16 February 1970 | Khartoum | Final | Ghana | 1–0 | Omar Ali Hasab El-Rasoul |
| (Cameroon) 1972 | 25 February 1972 | Douala | Group stage | Zaire | 1–1 | Hasab El-Rasoul Omar | Mayanga Maku |
| (Cameroon) 1972 | 27 February 1972 | Douala | Group stage | Morocco | 1–1 | Bushara Abdel-Nadief | Ahmed Faras |
| (Cameroon) 1972 | 29 February 1972 | Douala | Group stage | Congo | 2–4 | Kamal Abdel Wahab; Ahmed Bushara Wahba | Jean-Michel M'Bono (x2); François M'Pelé; Jonas Bahamboula |
| (Ethiopia) 1976 | 1 March 1976 | Dire Dawa | Group stage | Morocco | 2–2 | Ali Gagarin (x2) (p) | Mustapha Fetoui; Ahmed Abouali |
| (Ethiopia) 1976 | 4 March 1976 | Dire Dawa | Group stage | Nigeria | 0–1 | | Thompson Usiyan |
| (Ethiopia) 1976 | 6 March 1976 | Dire Dawa | Group stage | Zaire | 1–1 | Ali Gagarin | Ndaye Mulamba |
| (Ghana) 2008 | 22 January 2008 | Kumasi | Group stage | Zambia | 0–3 | | James Chamanga; Jacob Mulenga; Felix Katongo |
| (Ghana) 2008 | 26 January 2008 | Kumasi | Group stage | Egypt | 0–3 | | Hosny Abd Rabo; Mohamed Aboutrika (x2) |
| (Ghana) 2008 | 30 January 2008 | Tamale | Group stage | Cameroon | 0–3 | | Samuel Eto'o (x2) (p); Mohammed Ali El Khider (o.g.) |
| (Gabon) (Equatorial Guinea) 2012 | 22 January 2012 | Malabo | Group stage | Ivory Coast | 0–1 | | Didier Drogba |
| (Gabon) (Equatorial Guinea) 2012 | 26 January 2012 | Malabo | Group stage | Angola | 2–2 | Mohamed Ahmed Bashir (x2) | Manucho (x2) (p) |
| (Gabon) (Equatorial Guinea) 2012 | 30 January 2012 | Bata | Group stage | Burkina Faso | 2–1 | Mudather El Tahir (x2) | Issiaka Ouédraogo |
| (Gabon) (Equatorial Guinea) 2012 | 30 January 2012 | Bata | Quarter-finals | Zambia | 0–3 | | Stophira Sunzu; Christopher Katongo; James Chamanga |
| (Cameroon) 2021 | 11 January 2022 | Garoua | Group stage | Guinea-Bissau | 0–0 |
| (Cameroon) 2021 | 15 January 2022 | Garoua | Group stage | Nigeria | 1–3 | Walieldin Khedr (p) | Samuel Chukwueze; Taiwo Awoniyi; Moses Simon |
| (Cameroon) 2021 | 15 January 2022 | Yaoundé | Group stage | Egypt | 0–1 | | Mohamed Abdelmonem |
