= Football at the 1972 Summer Olympics – Men's African Qualifiers =

1972 Summer Olympics – Men's Football African Qualifiers
- Dates: 7 March 1971 – 28 May 1972

== Participating teams ==
- Algeria
- Cameroon
- United Arab Republic
- Ethiopia
- Gabon
- Ghana
- Guinea
- Libya
- Madagascar
- Morocco
- Mali
- Malawi
- Nigeria
- Niger
- Senegal
- Sudan
- Togo
- Tunisia
- Uganda
- Zambia

== First round ==
=== Group 1 ===
Team 1	Agg.	Team 2	1st leg	2nd leg
Tunisia	3–2	United Arab Republic	3–0	0–2
Mali	3–2	Algeria	1–0	2–2
Morocco	8–3	Niger	5–2	3–1

7 March 1971

Tunisia	3–0	United Arab Republic
Zouaoui 18' (pen.); Chaïbi 20'; Chakroun 50'

Stade El Menzah, Tunis
2 April 1971

United Arab Republic	2–0	Tunisia
Aboul-Ezz 42'; Khalil 73'

Cairo International Stadium, Cairo

14 March 1971

Mali	1–0	Algeria
K. Diallo 88'

Stade Municipal, Bamako
11 April 1971

Algeria	2–2 (a.e.t.)	Mali
Banus 8'; Fréha 66'		F. Keita 64', 117'

El-Annasser Stadium, Algiers
Attendance: 22 000
Referee: Georges Ulhen (France)

28 March 1971

Morocco	5–2	Niger
Faras 3', 79'; Bamous 18', 85'; Pitchou 20'		Garba 47', 62'

Casablanca
25 April 1971

Niger	1–3	Morocco
Boulay 44'		Faras 8'; Maâti 58'; Slimani 63'

Niamey

=== Group 2 ===
Team 1	Agg.	Team 2	1st leg	2nd leg
Togo	1–1 (5–3 p)	Guinea	1–1	0–0
Gabon	2–5	Cameroon	2–3	0–2
Nigeria	2–3	Senegal	1–1	1–2
Ghana	3–1	Liberia	2–1	1–0

7 February 1971

Togo	1–1	Guinea
Doctor Kaolo 50'		Maxime

Lomé
28 February 1971

Guinea	0–0	Togo
Penalties
	3–5

Conakry

30 May 1971

Gabon	2–3	Cameroon
Grande 19', 30'		Tsébo 12'; Akono 75' (pen.); Ndoga 80'

Libreville
13 June 1971

Cameroon	2–0^{1}	Gabon

Yaoundé

^{1} Gabon failed to appear for the match; Cameroon were awarded a 2–0 victory and advanced.

3 April 1971

Nigeria	1–1	Senegal
Hamilton 44'		Diarra 87'

Ibadan
18 April 1971

Senegal	2–1	Nigeria
Camara 43', 85'		Dombraye 23'

Dakar

21 March 1971

Ghana	2–1	Liberia
Kofi Bruce 19', 26'		Gaye 86'

Accra
17 April 1971

Liberia	0–1	Ghana
		Jabir

Monrovia

=== Group 3 ===
Team 1	Agg.	Team 2	1st leg	2nd leg
Ethiopia	7–3	Zambia	6–3	1–0
Malawi	3–6	Madagascar	1–2	2–4
Sudan	5–1	Uganda	4–0	1–1

16 May 1971

Ethiopia	6–3	Zambia
Vassalo 19' (pen.), 43'; Sebeta 34', 87'; Abate 70'; Zergaw 80'		Katiwa 14'; Mapulanga 22', 48'

Addis Ababa
30 May 1971

Zambia	0–1	Ethiopia
		Zergaw 21'

Lusaka

11 April 1971

Malawi	1–2	Madagascar
Osman 30'		Randria 1'; Andriamiharinosy 65'

Blantyre
9 May 1971

Madagascar	4–2	Malawi
Andriamiharinosy 12'; Randria 20'; Ravelojaona 53', 74'		Chikafa 7'; Griffin 33'

Antananarivo

4 June 1971

Sudan	4–0	Uganda
Ezzeldin Osman; Elfadil Santo

Khartoum
19 June 1971

Uganda	1–1	Sudan
Obua 32' (pen.)		Ezzeldin Osman 65'

Kampala

== Second round ==
=== Group 1 ===
Pos	Team	Pld	W	D	L	GF	GA	GD	Pts	Qualification
1	Morocco (Q)	4	2	2	0	9	5	+4	6	1972 Summer Olympics
2	Tunisia	4	1	2	1	7	5	+2	4	
3	Mali	4	1	0	3	4	10	−6	2	

(Q) Qualified for the phase indicated
23 April 1972

Tunisia	3–3	Morocco
Chakroun 8'; Lahzami 39'; Akid 88'		Zahraoui 20'; Faras 25'; Yaghcha 82'

Stade El Menzah, Tunis
30 April 1972

Morocco	2–1	Mali
Faras 2'; Yaghcha 35'		C. Diallo 13'

Casablanca
7 May 1972

Mali	2–0	Tunisia
Yatassaye 69'; Diakhité 85'

Bamako

14 May 1972

Morocco	0–0	Tunisia

Casablanca
21 May 1972

Mali	1–4	Morocco
Maiga 20'		? 44' (o.g.); Faras 65'; Kala 83'; Tazi 89'

Bamako
28 May 1972

Tunisia	4–0	Mali
Chakroun 2'; Khouini 27'; Ben Mrad 32'; Chemam 81'

Stade El Menzah, Tunis

=== Group 2 ===
Pos	Team	Pld	W	D	L	GF	GA	GD	Pts	Qualification
1	Ghana (Q)	6	3	2	1	7	3	+4	8	1972 Summer Olympics
2	Cameroon	6	3	2	1	7	7	0	8	
3	Senegal	6	2	2	2	8	6	+2	6	
4	Togo	6	0	2	4	3	9	−6	2	

(Q) Qualified for the phase indicated
23 April 1972

Senegal	1–1	Cameroon
Locotte 72'		Guèye 21' (o.g.)

Dakar
23 April 1972

Ghana	1–1	Togo
Jabir 80'		Ayitégan 30'

Accra

30 April 1972

Cameroon	0–3	Ghana
		Jabir 42', 55'; Owusu 89'

Yaoundé
30 April 1972

Togo	1–3	Senegal
Doctor Kaolo 19'		Diarra 60'; Petit 75'; Touré 88'

Lomé

7 May 1972

Togo	1–2	Cameroon
Geraldo 70' (pen.)		Nlend 67'; Manga Onguéné 77'

Lomé
7 May 1972

Ghana	1–0	Senegal
Jabir 82'

Accra

14 May 1972

Togo	0–2	Ghana
		J. K. Mensah 12'; Jabir 48'

Lomé
14 May 1972

Cameroon	3–2	Senegal
Léa 39'; Mouthé 57'; Ndoga 88'		Farhat 80', 86'

Douala

21 May 1972

Ghana	0–0	Cameroon

Accra
21 May 1972

Senegal	0–0	Togo

Dakar

28 May 1972

Cameroon	1–0	Togo
Ndoga 29'

Douala
28 May 1972

Senegal	2–0	Ghana
Eusebio 9'; Sy 28'

Dakar

=== Group 3 ===
Pos	Team	Pld	W	D	L	GF	GA	GD	Pts	Qualification
1	Sudan (Q)	4	3	1	0	8	2	+6	7	1972 Summer Olympics
2	Ethiopia	4	2	1	1	7	6	+1	5	
3	Madagascar	4	0	0	4	3	10	−7	0	

(Q) Qualified for the phase indicated
23 April 1972

Madagascar	1–2	Ethiopia
Andriamiharinosy 76'		Yosef 42'; Teka 50'

Antananarivo
2 May 1972

Ethiopia	2–2	Sudan
Sebeta 7'; Zergaw 50'		Hasabu El Sagheir 5'; Kamal Abdelwahab 87'

Addis Ababa
7 May 1972

Sudan	3–0	Madagascar
Hasabu El Sagheir; Ezzeldin Osman; Kamal Abdelwahab

Khartoum

14 May 1972

Ethiopia	3–2	Madagascar
Zerihun 8'; Zergaw 40'; Dessie 52'		Andriamiharinosy 2'; Kira 22'

Addis Ababa
21 May 1972

Sudan	1–0	Ethiopia
Kamal Abdelwahab 12'

Khartoum
28 May 1972

Madagascar	0–2^{1}	Sudan

Antananarivo

^{1} The match was abandoned after Magalasy immigration officials refused the Sudanese team entry into the country following mass protests; Sudan were awarded the match 2–0.
