= Mali at the Africa Cup of Nations =

Mali's AFCON history

Mali has a long and historical tradition of participating in the Africa Cup of Nations.

Even though Mali's participation in the AFCON prior to 21st century was sporadic, they managed a number of notable achievements, but are yet to win the tournament. In their debut at 1972 Africa Cup of Nations, Mali finished runners-up behind Congo, a great feat up to date. Prior to 2008, each time Mali qualified, they reached the knockout stage, having only qualified four times before then. Mali hosted the 2002 Africa Cup of Nations; it is the only time Mali have hosted the tournament thus far. In 2015, Mali was eliminated with controversy because of drawing of lots to Guinea.

== Overall record ==
Africa Cup of Nations record									Qualification record					
Year	Result	Position	Pld	W	D	L	GF	GA	Pld	W	D	L	GF	GA
(Sudan) 1957	Part of France								Part of France					
(United Arab Republic) 1959	Part of France								Part of France					
(Ethiopia) 1962	Did not enter								Did not enter					
(Ghana) 1963	Did not enter								Did not enter					
(Tunisia) 1965	Did not qualify								Did not qualify					
(Ethiopia) 1968	Did not qualify								Did not qualify					
(Sudan) 1970	Did not qualify								Did not qualify					
(Cameroon) 1972	Runners-up	2nd	5	1	3	1	11	11	4	3	1	0	7	2
(Egypt) 1974	Did not qualify								4	1	3	0	8	6
(Ethiopia) 1976	Did not qualify								2	1	0	1	5	3
(Ghana) 1978	Did not qualify								2	1	0	1	1	2
(Nigeria) 1980	Did not qualify								Did not enter					
(Libya) 1982	Did not qualify								4	2	0	2	7	7
(Ivory Coast) 1984	Did not qualify								4	2	0	2	5	6
(Egypt) 1986	Did not qualify								4	1	2	1	4	9
(Morocco) 1988	Did not qualify								Withdrew					
(Algeria) 1990	Did not qualify								6	2	3	1	8	7
(Senegal) 1992	Did not qualify								6	0	3	3	2	7
(Tunisia) 1994	Fourth place	4th	5	2	0	3	4	8	6	3	1	2	8	7
(South Africa) 1996	Did not qualify								10	5	1	4	15	10
(Burkina Faso) 1998	Did not qualify								6	3	0	3	9	9
(Ghana) (Nigeria) 2000	Did not qualify								8	3	4	1	8	3
(Mali) 2002	Fourth place	4th	6	2	2	2	5	5	Qualified as hosts					
(Tunisia) 2004	Fourth place	4th	6	3	1	2	10	10	6	4	1	1	9	2
(Egypt) 2006	Did not qualify								12	4	2	6	15	15
(Ghana) 2008	Group stage	10th	3	1	1	1	1	3	6	3	3	0	10	1
(Angola) 2010	Group stage	9th	3	1	1	1	7	6	12	6	3	3	21	15
(Gabon) (Equatorial Guinea) 2012	Third place	3rd	6	3	1	2	6	5	6	3	1	2	9	6
(South Africa) 2013	Third place	3rd	6	2	2	2	7	8	2	2	0	0	7	1
(Equatorial Guinea) 2015	Group stage	10th	3	0	3	0	3	3	6	3	0	3	8	6
(Gabon) 2017	Group stage	12th	3	0	2	1	1	2	6	5	1	0	13	3
(Egypt) 2019	Round of 16	11th	4	2	1	1	6	3	6	4	2	0	10	2
(Cameroon) 2021	Round of 16	11th	4	2	2	0	4	1	6	4	1	1	10	4
(Ivory Coast) 2023	Quarter-finals	7th	5	2	2	1	6	4	6	5	0	1	15	2
(Morocco) 2025	Qualified								6	4	2	0	10	1
(Kenya) (Tanzania) (Uganda) 2027	To be determined								To be determined					
Total	Runners-up	14/35	59	21	21	17	71	69	146	74	34	38	224	136

== Tournaments and squads ==
Year	Date	Location	Opponent	Score	Mali scorers	Round
(Cameroon) 1972	24 February 1972	(Cameroon) Yaoundé	Togo	3–3	Bakary Traoré 10'; Fantamady Keita 46'; Bako Touré 49'	Group stage
(Cameroon) 1972	26 February 1972	(Cameroon) Yaoundé	Kenya	1–1	Fantamady Keita 45'	Group stage
(Cameroon) 1972	28 February 1972	(Cameroon) Yaoundé	Cameroon	1–1	Fantamady Keita 43'	Group stage
(Cameroon) 1972	2 March 1972	(Cameroon) Douala	Zaire	4–3 (a.e.t.)	Adama Traoré 17'; Fantamady Keita 48', 92'; Bako Touré 68'	Semi-finals
(Cameroon) 1972	5 March 1972	(Cameroon) Yaoundé	Congo	2–3	Moussa Diakhité 42'; Moussa Traoré 75'	Final
(Tunisia) 1994	26 March 1994	(Tunisia) Tunis	Tunisia	2–0	Fernand Coulibaly 25'; Modibo Sidibé 34'	Group stage
(Tunisia) 1994	28 March 1994	(Tunisia) Tunis	Zaire	0–1		Group stage
(Tunisia) 1994	2 April 1994	(Tunisia) Tunis	Egypt	1–0	Soumaila Traoré 64'	Quarter-finals
(Tunisia) 1994	6 April 1994	(Tunisia) Tunis	Zambia	0–4		Semi-finals
(Tunisia) 1994	10 April 1994	(Tunisia) Tunis	Ivory Coast	1–3	Amadou Diallo 46'	Third place play-off
(Mali) 2002	19 January 2002	(Mali) Bamako	Liberia	1–1	Seydou Keita 87'	Group stage
(Mali) 2002	24 January 2002	(Mali) Bamako	Nigeria	0–0		Group stage
(Mali) 2002	28 January 2002	(Mali) Bamako	Algeria	2–0	Mamadou Bagayoko 18'; Bassala Touré 24'	Group stage
(Mali) 2002	3 February 2002	(Mali) Kayes	South Africa	2–0	Bassala Touré 69'; Dramane Coulibaly 90+2'	Quarter-finals
(Mali) 2002	7 February 2002	(Mali) Bamako	Cameroon	0–3		Semi-finals
(Mali) 2002	9 February 2002	(Mali) Mopti	Nigeria	0–1		Third place play-off
(Tunisia) 2004	26 January 2004	(Tunisia) Bizerte	Kenya	3–1	Mohamed Sissoko 28'; Frédéric Kanouté 63', 81'	Group stage
(Tunisia) 2004	30 January 2004	(Tunisia) Tunis	Burkina Faso	3–1	Frédéric Kanouté 34'; Mahamadou Diarra 37'; Soumaila Coulibaly 78'	Group stage
(Tunisia) 2004	2 February 2004	(Tunisia) Tunis	Senegal	1–1	Dramane Traoré 34'	Group stage
(Tunisia) 2004	7 February 2004	(Tunisia) Tunis	Guinea	2–1	Frédéric Kanouté 45'; Mahamadou Diarra 90'	Quarter-finals
(Tunisia) 2004	11 February 2004	(Tunisia) Sousse	Morocco	0–4		Semi-finals
(Tunisia) 2004	13 February 2004	(Tunisia) Monastir	Nigeria	1–2	Sédonoudé Abouta 70'	Third place play-off
(Ghana) 2008	21 January 2008	(Ghana) Sekondi-Takoradi	Benin	1–0	Frédéric Kanouté 49' (pen.)	Group stage
(Ghana) 2008	25 January 2008	(Ghana) Sekondi-Takoradi	Nigeria	0–0		Group stage
(Ghana) 2008	29 January 2008	(Ghana) Accra	Ivory Coast	0–3		Group stage
(Angola) 2010	10 January 2010	(Angola) Luanda	Angola	4–4	Seydou Keita 79', 90+3'; Frédéric Kanouté 88'; Mustapha Yatabaré 90+4'	Group stage
(Angola) 2010	14 January 2010	(Angola) Luanda	Algeria	0–1		Group stage
(Angola) 2010	18 January 2010	(Angola) Cabinda	Malawi	3–1	Frédéric Kanouté 1'; Seydou Keita 3'; Mamadou Bagayoko 85'	Group stage
(Gabon) (Equatorial Guinea) 2012	24 January 2012	(Gabon) Franceville	Guinea	1–0	Bakaye Traoré 30'	Group stage
(Gabon) (Equatorial Guinea) 2012	28 January 2012	(Gabon) Franceville	Ghana	0–2		Group stage
(Gabon) (Equatorial Guinea) 2012	1 February 2012	(Gabon) Franceville	Botswana	2–1	Garra Dembélé 56'; Seydou Keita 75'	Group stage
(Gabon) (Equatorial Guinea) 2012	5 February 2012	(Gabon) Libreville	Gabon	1–1 (5–4 p)	Cheick Diabaté 85'	Quarter-finals
(Gabon) (Equatorial Guinea) 2012	8 February 2012	(Gabon) Libreville	Ivory Coast	0–1		Semi-finals
(Gabon) (Equatorial Guinea) 2012	11 February 2012	(Equatorial Guinea) Malabo	Ghana	2–0	Cheick Diabaté 23', 80'	Third place play-off
(South Africa) 2013	20 January 2013	(South Africa) Port Elizabeth	Niger	1–0	Seydou Keita 84'	Group stage
(South Africa) 2013	24 January 2013	(South Africa) Port Elizabeth	Ghana	0–1		Group stage
(South Africa) 2013	28 January 2013	(South Africa) Durban	DR Congo	1–1	Mamadou Samassa 15'	Group stage
(South Africa) 2013	2 February 2013	(South Africa) Durban	South Africa	1–1 (3–1 p)	Seydou Keita 58'	Quarter-finals
(South Africa) 2013	6 February 2013	(South Africa) Durban	Nigeria	1–4	Cheick Fantamady Diarra 75'	Semi-finals
(South Africa) 2013	9 February 2013	(South Africa) Port Elizabeth	Ghana	3–1	Mamadou Samassa 21'; Seydou Keita 48'; Sigamary Diarra 90+4'	Third place play-off
(Equatorial Guinea) 2015	20 January 2015	(Equatorial Guinea) Malabo	Cameroon	1–1	Sambou Yatabaré 71'	Group stage
(Equatorial Guinea) 2015	24 January 2015	(Equatorial Guinea) Malabo	Ivory Coast	1–1	Bakary Sako 7'	Group stage
(Equatorial Guinea) 2015	28 January 2015	(Equatorial Guinea) Mongomo	Guinea	1–1	Modibo Maïga 47'	Group stage
(Gabon) 2017	17 January 2017	(Gabon) Port-Gentil	Egypt	0–0		Group stage
(Gabon) 2017	21 January 2017	(Gabon) Port-Gentil	Ghana	0–1		Group stage
(Gabon) 2017	25 January 2017	(Gabon) Oyem	Uganda	1–1	Yves Bissouma 73'	Group stage
(Egypt) 2019	24 June 2019	(Egypt) Suez	Mauritania	4–1	Abdoulay Diaby 37'; Moussa Marega 45' (pen.); Adama Traoré II 55'; Adama Traoré I 74'	Group stage
(Egypt) 2019	28 June 2019	(Egypt) Suez	Tunisia	1–1	Diadie Samassékou 60'	Group stage
(Egypt) 2019	2 July 2019	(Egypt) Ismaila	Angola	1–0	Amadou Haidara 37'	Group stage
(Egypt) 2019	8 July 2019	(Egypt) Suez	Ivory Coast	0–1		Round of 16
(Cameroon) 2021	12 January 2022	(Cameroon) Limbe	Tunisia	1–0	Ibrahima Koné 48' (pen.)	Group stage
(Cameroon) 2021	16 January 2022	(Cameroon) Limbe	Gambia	1–1	Ibrahima Koné 79' (pen.)	Group stage
(Cameroon) 2021	20 January 2022	(Cameroon) Douala	Mauritania	2–0	Massadio Haïdara 2'; Ibrahima Koné 49' (pen.)	Group stage
(Cameroon) 2021	26 January 2022	(Cameroon) Limbe	Equatorial Guinea	0–0 (5–6 p)		Round of 16
(Ivory Coast) 2023	16 January 2024	(Ivory Coast) Korhogo	South Africa	2–0	Hamari Traoré 60'; Lassine Sinayoko 66'	Group stage
(Ivory Coast) 2023	20 January 2024	(Ivory Coast) Korhogo	Tunisia	1–1	Lassine Sinayoko 10'	Group stage
(Ivory Coast) 2023	24 January 2024	(Ivory Coast) San-Pédro	Namibia	0–0		Group stage
(Ivory Coast) 2023	30 January 2024	(Ivory Coast) Korhogo	Burkina Faso	2–1	Edmond Tapsoba 3' (o.g.); Lassine Sinayoko 47'	Round of 16
(Ivory Coast) 2023	3 February 2024	(Ivory Coast) Bouaké	Ivory Coast	1–2 (a.e.t.)	Dorgeles Nene 71'	Quarter-finals
