= Mohamed Abdel Fattah =

Mohamed Abdel Fattah or Mohamed Abdel Fatah may refer to:

- Mohamed Abdel Fattah (cyclist), Egyptian cyclist
- Mohamed Abdelfatah (wrestler), Egyptian wrestler
- Mohamed Abdel Fatah (footballer), Sudanese footballer
