= Jean-Bertrand Balékita =

Congolese footballer (born 1948)

Personal information
- Full name: Jean-Bertrand Balékita
- Date of birth: 6 January 1948 (age 78)
- Place of birth: Brazzaville, Congo–Brazzaville
- Height: 1.68 m (5 ft 6 in)
- Position: Right winger

Senior career*
Years	Team	Apps	(Gls)
1967–1968	Patronage Sainte-Anne		
1969–1971	Ajaccio	13	(1)
1971–1972	Toulon	46	(3)
1974–1975	Montpellier	9	(3)
Total		77	(7)

International career
1972–1974	Congo		
Medal record
Men's football
Representing Congo
Africa Cup of Nations
Winner	1972 Cameroon
- * Club domestic league appearances and goals

Jean-Bertrand Balékita (born 6 January 1948) is a retired Congolese footballer. Nicknamed "Claise-Zézé", he primarily played in France throughout his career, playing for Ajaccio, Toulon and Montpellier throughout his career. He also represented his home country of Congo-Brazzaville internationally, being a part of the winning squad of the 1972 African Cup of Nations.

== Club career ==
Balékita began his career with Patronage Sainte-Anne in 1967 after being inspired by fellow Congolese international Bernard Foundoux Mulélé. He spent the 1971–72 French Division 2 playing for Toulon where the club narrowly missed promotion. Following that, he played for Montpelier in their inaugural 1974–75 season where despite making just nine appearances, he scored three goals.

== International career ==
Balékita was selected to represent his home country of Congo for the 1972 African Cup of Nations. Due to limitations by the CAF, he and fellow Congolese forward François M'Pelé would be the only two players allowed to represent their home country whilst playing in a foreign league. In spite of this, he contributed to the club's only title in the tournament as of 2026, playing in the final. He later returned for the 1974 African Cup of Nations where the club would narrowly be eliminated from the tournament following an extra goal scored by Zambian forward Bernard Chanda.

== Personal life ==
Jean-Betrand's older brothers Serge-Simon Balékita-Nzaba and Ferdinand Balékita were also professional footballers. Following his football career, he joined the army and became a colonel and held the position of military attaché at the Congolese embassy in Cuba. Despite his service in both football as well as in the military, neither he nor M'Pelé had enjoyed suitable retirements.
