= Tommy Sylvestre =

Footballer (born 1946)

Personal information
- Full name: Tommy Geraldo Sylvestre
- Date of birth: 31 August 1946 (age 80)
- Place of birth: Leopoldville, Belgian Congo
- Height: 1.75 m (5 ft 9 in)
- Position: Goalkeeper

Senior career*
Years	Team	Apps	(Gls)
1964–1974	Étoile Filante de Lomé		
1974–1979	Stade d'Abidjan		
1979–1982	Stella Club d'Adjamé		

International career
1971–1975	Togo	21	(0)
- * Club domestic league appearances and goals

Tommy Sylvestre (born 31 August 1946) is a former footballer who played as a goalkeeper. Born in Congo, he represented the Togo national team at international level.

== Career ==
Born in Kinshasa, Sylvestre moved to Lomé and began playing club football for local side Étoile Filante de Lomé. He enjoyed success with Étoile Filante, helping the club reach the finals of the 1968 African Cup of Champions Clubs. In 1974, Sylvestre moved to Côte d'Ivoire to finish his career with Stade d'Abidjan and Stella Club d'Adjamé.

Sylvestre made several appearances for the senior Togo national team. He made a penalty save against Ghana that helped Togo reach its first 1972 African Cup of Nations finals, where he would be named the best goalkeeper in the tournament.

In 2006, he was selected by CAF as one of the best 200 African football players of the last 50 years.
