= Paul Tandou =

Congolese footballer (1947–2023)

Personal information
- Date of birth: 13 July 1947
- Date of death: 15 November 2023 (aged 76)
- Position: Goalkeeper

Senior career*
Years	Team	Apps	(Gls)
- CSMD Diables Noirs
- CARA Brazzaville

International career
1968–1974	Congo		
Medal record
Men's football
Representing Congo
Africa Cup of Nations
Winner	1972 Cameroon
- * Club domestic league appearances and goals

Paul Tandou (13 July 1947 – 15 November 2023) was a Congolese footballer who played as a goalkeeper. He won the 1972 African Cup of Nations with the Congo national team and the CAF Champions League in 1974 with CARA Brazzaville. Tandou died on 15 November 2023, at the age of 76.

== Honours ==
People's Republic of the Congo

- African Cup of Nations: 1972
