= Burundu =

Village in Western Province, Kenya

- Rural village
- Interactive map of Burundu
- Coordinates: 0°26′30.39″N 34°45′18.57″E
- Country: Kenya
- County: Kakamega

Burundu is a rural village in Kakamega County of the former Western Province in Kenya.

== Geography ==
It is part of the West Kabras ward of Malava Constituency and Kakamega County Council.

The village is known for traditional medicine and traditionalists, including Murunga Joseph Mulambula, who is also a teacher. Some old herbs species exist on the banks of Lusumu River, bordering Burundu to the south.

== Demography ==
The people of Burundu are Kabras, a subgroup of the Luhya.

== Economy ==
The main economic activity is sugar cane farming as a cash crop. Maize and sweet potatoes are grown for subsistence. Cattle, sheep, goats, chicken and ducks are reared on small scale.

An extra high voltage (132 kV) transmission line from Owen Falls, Jinja, Uganda crosses Burundu on its way to Nairobi. The village is, however, not supplied with electricity.

Road coverage is good, but trailers transporting sugar cane damage them during sugar cane harvest.

Phone coverage is provided by Zain, Yu and Safaricom that have base stations in Nambacha and Muhuni.

== Schools ==
One public school operates there: Burundu Primary School. most children attend neighbouring villages' schools. The village is sparsely populated, with most people literate.

== Notables ==
Prominent Burundu people include:

- Dr Shikuku Musima Mulambula, a senior lecturer at Moi University, Department of Educational Psychology
- Dr. Chemuku Wekesa, a Landscape Ecologist at Kenya Forestry Research Institute (KEFRI), Coast Eco-Region Research Programme
- Former Kenyan footballer Jonathan Niva
