= Jean-Michel Ongagna =

Congolese footballer (1945–2021)

Personal information
- Full name: Jean-Michel Ongagna
- Date of birth: 11 July 1945
- Place of birth: Brazzaville, Congo, French Equatorial Africa
- Date of death: 6 July 2021 (aged 75)
- Place of death: Ouenzé, Brazzaville, Congo–Brazzaville
- Position: Forward

Youth career
- Pergola de Cognac François

Senior career*
Years	Team	Apps	(Gls)
1963–1972	Étoile du Congo		

International career
1965–1972	Congo–Brazzaville		
Medal record
Men's football
Representing Congo
Africa Cup of Nations
Winner	1972 Cameroon
- * Club domestic league appearances and goals

Jean-Michel Ongagna (11 July 1945 – 6 July 2021) was a Congolese footballer. Nicknamed "Excellent", he played as a forward for Étoile du Congo throughout the 1960s and the 1970s. He also represented his home country of Congo–Brazzaville, being a part of the winning squad for the 1972 African Cup of Nations.

== Club career ==
Ongagna began his youth career by playing for Pergola de Cognac François in Poto-Poto within the Grande École there alongside other players such as Massembo Yako, Loumeto and Maloumbi. He then spent his senior career playing for Étoile du Congo on a club level. He was a part of the winning squad for the 1968 Congo Ligue 1 as he was named the best Congolese footballer the year prior. He was primarily characterized by the use of his left foot to score goals, serving as one of the main goalscorers for the club.

== International career ==
Ongagna was first called up to represent at the 1965 All-Africa Games where he won the gold medal at the football tournament held there. He later played in the 1968 Africa Cup of Nations where the club ended up in the group stage. He found far greater success upon the next Congolese qualification for the tournament through the 1972 Africa Cup of Nations as the club would win their only title in the tournament as of 2026.

== Personal life ==
Ongagna died on 6 July 2021 at Ouenzé, Brazzaville at his home by Makoua Street.
