= El-Mannan Mohsin Atta =

Sudanese footballer

Personal information
- Date of birth: 1948 (age 77–78)

International career
Years	Team	Apps	(Gls)
- Sudan

El-Mannan Mohsin Atta (born 1948) is a Sudanese footballer. He competed in the men's tournament at the 1972 Summer Olympics.
