= 1968 African Cup of Champions Clubs =

Tournament details
- Dates: April 1968 – 30 March 1969
- Teams: 20 (from 1 confederation)

Final positions
- Champions: (Democratic Republic of the Congo) TP Englebert (2nd title)
- Runners-up: (Togo) Étoile Filante (Lomé)

Tournament statistics
- Matches played: 30
- Goals scored: 102 (3.4 per match)
- Top scorer: (Democratic Republic of the Congo) Pierre Kalala (7 goals)

The African Cup of Champions Clubs 1968 was the 4th edition of the annual international club football competition held in the CAF region (Africa), the African Cup of Champions Clubs. It determined that year's club champion of association football in Africa.

The tournament was played by 20 teams and used a knock-out format with ties played home and away. TP Englebert from Congo-Kinshasa won the final, and became CAF club champion for the second time in a row for the first time this makes the record holders for the number of titles won.

== Preliminary round ==
Team 1	Agg.	Team 2	1st leg	2nd leg
Etoile du Congo (Republic of the Congo)	w/o^{1}	(Sierra Leone) Mighty Blackpool	—	—
FAR Rabat (Morocco)	w/o^{1}	(The Gambia) Augustinians FC	—	—
Police (Mogadishu) (Somalia)	w/o^{1}	(Tanzania) Cosmopolitans FC	—	—
Secteur 6 (Niger)	2–4	(Republic of Upper Volta) US Ouagadougou	1–1	1–3

^{1} Mighty Blackpool, Augustinians FC and Cosmopolitans FC all withdrew.

== First round ==
Team 1	Agg.	Team 2	1st leg	2nd leg
Abaluhya United (Kenya)	4–2	(Ethiopia) Saint-George SA	1–1	3–1
Africa Sports (Ivory Coast)	6–4^{1}	(Democratic Republic of the Congo) TP Englebert	2–0	4–4
Etoile du Congo (Republic of the Congo)	4–6	(Cameroon) Oryx Douala	1–2	3–4
FAR Rabat (Morocco)	3–0	(Senegal) Foyer France	2–0	1–0
Mighty Barrolle (Liberia)	1–2^{2}	(Guinea) Conakry II	1–2	n/p^{2}
Police (Mogadishu) (Somalia)	2–4	(Sudan) Al-Mourada	1–1	1–3
Stationery Stores (Nigeria)	4–4^{3}	(Ghana) Cape Coast Dwarfs	3–2	1–2
US Ouagadougou (Republic of Upper Volta)	1–6	(Togo) Étoile Filante (Lomé)	1–4	0–2

^{1} Africa Sports were ejected from the competition for fielding three ineligible players.
^{2} Mighty Barolle were disqualified after Liberia was suspended by FIFA.
^{3} Stationery Stores won after drawing of lots.

== Quarter-finals ==
Team 1	Agg.	Team 2	1st leg	2nd leg
Abaluhya United (Kenya)	4–3	(Sudan) Al-Mourada	3–0	1–3
Étoile Filante (Lomé) (Togo)	3–0	(Guinea) Conakry II	3–0^{1}	n/p^{1}
FAR Rabat (Morocco)	2–2^{2}	(Nigeria) Stationery Stores	1–0	1–2
TP Englebert (Democratic Republic of the Congo)	5–0	(Cameroon) Oryx Douala	3–0	2–0

^{1} The 1st leg was abandoned at 72' with Étoile Filante leading 3–0 after Conakry II walked off to protest the officiating and withdrew from the tournament; the 2nd leg was scratched and Étoile Filante advanced.
^{2} A third match was played in Dakar by mutual agreement: after this match finished 2–2 when extra time expired, FAR Rabat won after a drawing of lots.

== Semi-finals ==
Team 1	Agg.	Team 2	1st leg	2nd leg
Abaluhya United (Kenya)	2–4	(Togo) Étoile Filante (Lomé)	2–0	0–4
TP Englebert (Democratic Republic of the Congo)	4–2	(Morocco) FAR Rabat	1–1	3–1

== Final ==
16 March 1969
--:-- UTC+1

TP Englebert (Democratic Republic of the Congo)	5–0	(Togo) Étoile Filante (Lomé)
Kalala 3', 75'; Kalonzo 40'; Tshinabu 46', 57'

20 May Stadium, Kinshasa
30 March 1969
--:-- UTC+0

Étoile Filante (Lomé) (Togo)	4–1	(Democratic Republic of the Congo) TP Englebert
Docteur Kaolo; Ananou		Kalonzo

Stade Général Eyadema, Lomé

TP Englebert won 6–4 on aggregate.

== Champion ==
1968 African Cup of Champions Clubs

TP Englebert
Second Title

== Top scorers ==
The top scorers from the 1968 African Cup of Champions Clubs are as follows:

Rank	Name	Team	Goals
1	(Democratic Republic of the Congo) Pierre Kalala	(Democratic Republic of the Congo) TP Englebert	7
2	(Democratic Republic of the Congo) Kamunda Tshinabu	(Democratic Republic of the Congo) TP Englebert	5
3	(Kenya) Joe Kadenge	(Kenya) Abaluhya United	3
3	(Kenya) John Nyawanga	(Kenya) Abaluhya United	3
3	(Morocco) Driss Bamous	(Morocco) FAR Rabat	3
6	(Democratic Republic of the Congo) André Kalonzo	(Democratic Republic of the Congo) TP Englebert	2
6	(Democratic Republic of the Congo) ... Nyembo "Toyota"	(Democratic Republic of the Congo) TP Englebert	2
6	(Kenya) John Ambani	(Kenya) Abaluhya United	2
6	(Morocco) Moulay Driss Cherika	(Morocco) FAR Rabat	2
6	(Togo) Désiré Ananou	(Togo) Étoile Filante	2
6	(Togo) Docteur Kaolo	(Togo) Étoile Filante	2
