= Charles Léa Eyoum =

Cameroonian footballer

Personal information
- Date of birth: 16 January 1951 (age 75)
- Place of birth: Douala, Cameroon
- Height: 1.82 m (6 ft 0 in)
- Position: Forward

Senior career*
| Years | Team | Apps | (Gls) |
| 1968–1969 | Aigle Nkongsamba | | |
| 1969–1971 | Diamant Yaoundé | | |
| 1971–1972 | Canon Yaoundé | | |
| 1972–1973 | Toulouse | | |
| 1973–1974 | Quevilly | | |
| 1974–1976 | Rennes | | |
| 1976–1977 | Amicale de Lucé | | |
| 1977–1978 | Caen | | |
| 1978–1979 | Villemomble | | |

International career
| 1969–1972 | Cameroon | 52 | (?) |
Medal record
Men's football
Representing Cameroon
Africa Cup of Nations
| Third place | 1972 Cameroon |
- * Club domestic league appearances and goals

Charles Léa Eyoum (born 16 January 1951) is a Cameroonian retired professional football player and manager. A forward, he competed for the Cameroon national football team at the 1972 African Cup of Nations.

== Club career ==
Born in Douala, Léa Eyoum began playing football as a center forward with local side Aigle Nkongsamba. Soon after, he joined Diamant Yaoundé and Canon Yaoundé. He won the 1971 Cameroonian Cup with Diamant Yaoundé and the 1971 African Cup of Champions Clubs title with Canon.

Léa Eyoum made 52 appearances for the Cameroon national football team from 1969 to 1972.

In 2006, Léa Eyoum was selected by CAF as one of the best 200 African football players of the last 50 years.

== Coaching career ==
After retiring from playing, Léa Eyoum became a football manager. He received a coaching license in France and began as a player-manager with D3 side Villemomble Sports in 1978. Next, he returned to Cameroon where he would lead local clubs AS Babimbi, Léopards Douala, Dynamo Douala and Union Douala.

== Honours ==
Cameroon

- African Cup of Nations: 3rd place, 1972
