= Maxime Matsima =

Congolese footballer

Personal information
- Date of birth: November 18, 1940
- Place of birth: Brazzaville, Middle Congo
- Date of death: January 19, 2003 (aged 62)
- Position: Goalkeeper

Senior career*
Years	Team	Apps	(Gls)
1961-1978	Diables Noirs		

International career
1966-1978	People's Republic of the Congo		
Medal record
Men's football
Representing Congo
Africa Cup of Nations
Winner	1972 Cameroon
- * Club domestic league appearances and goals

Maxime Matsima (born 18 November 1940) was a Congolese football goalkeeper who played for People's Republic of the Congo in the 1972 African Cup of Nations.

== Honours ==
People's Republic of the Congo

- African Cup of Nations: 1972
