= Khalifa El-Bakhti =

Moroccan footballer (1950–2009)

Personal information
- Date of birth: 1950
- Date of death: 25 March 2009 (aged 58–59)
- Place of death: Rabat, Morocco
- Position: Defender

Senior career*
| Years | Team | Apps | (Gls) |
- FAR Rabat

International career
- Morocco
- * Club domestic league appearances and goals

Khalifa El-Bakhti (1950 – 25 March 2009) was a Moroccan footballer. He competed in the men's tournament at the 1972 Summer Olympics.
