= Mamadou Keïta =

Malian footballer

Personal information
- Date of birth: 20 October 1947
- Place of birth: Bamako, Mali
- Date of death: 9 April 2008 (aged 60)
- Place of death: Mali
- Position: Goalkeeper

Senior career*
Years	Team	Apps	(Gls)
196?–197?	Stade Malien		

International career
19??–197?	Mali		

Managerial career
- 1983–1984: Mali U-17
- 1993–1997: Mali
- Gonfreville Alliance Club (Bouaké)
- ASC Bouaké
- Africa Sports d'Abidjan
- AS Denguélé
- Stade Malien
- AS Biton
- Jeunesse Athletic Club (Port-Gentil)
- Club Sport Batavéa (Libreville)
- 2004–2005: Mali
- * Club domestic league appearances and goals

Mamadou Keïta (born 20 October 1947 in Bamako, death 9 April 2008) was a Malian professional football player and manager.

== Career ==
After primary studies in Bagadadji and secondary studies in the Technical School and Secondary Normal School in Bamako, Mamadou Keïta studied at the College of Sports in Cologne (Germany) where he obtained a Sport Teacher Certificate, Diploma for Football 1974/1975.

Mamadou Keïta played for the Stade Malien in Bamako. He was a player of the Mali national football team and played in particular during the 1972 Africa Cup of Nations in Yaoundé, where he was named best goalkeeper.

Mamadou Keïta has coached several Ivorian clubs (Gonfreville Alliance Club (GAC) in Bouaké, ASC Bouaké, Africa Sports d'Abidjan, AS Denguélé in Odienné), Malian clubs (Stade Malien, AS Biton in Segou) and Gabonese club (Jeunesse Athletic Club in Port-Gentil, Club Sport Batavéa (CBS) in Libreville).

In 1983–1984, he led the junior national team of Mali (the "eagles"). In 1993, he became coach of the Mali national football team for the 1994 African Cup of Nations.

Since August 2004 until February 2005 he again coached the Mali national football team.

== Death ==
Mamadou Keïta died on 9 April 2008.
