= Joseph Yegba Maya =

Cameroonian footballer (1944–2026)

Personal information
- Date of birth: 8 April 1944
- Place of birth: Otele, French Cameroon
- Date of death: 4 October 2026 (aged 82)
- Height: 1.82 m (6 ft 0 in)
- Position: Forward

Senior career*
Years	Team	Apps	(Gls)
1962–1970	Marseille	202	(103)
1970–1973	Valenciennes	104	(63)
1973–1975	Strasbourg	31	(12)
1975–1976	AS Béziers	23	(13)

International career
1964–1974	Cameroon		
Medal record
Men's football
Representing Cameroon
Africa Cup of Nations
Third place	1972 Cameroon
- * Club domestic league appearances and goals

Joseph Yegba Maya (8 April 1944 – 4 October 2026) was a Cameroonian professional footballer who played as a forward. He spent most of his career with French clubs and represented the Cameroon national team at international level. Yegba Maya died on 4 October 2026, at the age of 82. His younger brother, Martin Maya also represented Cameroon.

== Honours ==
Cameroon

- African Cup of Nations third place: 1972
