= Jean Manga Onguéné =

Cameroonian footballer (1946–2026)

Personal information
- Date of birth: 12 June 1946
- Place of birth: Ngoulemekong, French Cameroon
- Date of death: 6 October 2026 (aged 80)
- Height: 1.80 m (5 ft 11 in)
- Position: Forward

Senior career*
Years	Team	Apps	(Gls)
1966–1982	Canon Yaoundé		

International career
1967–1981	Cameroon	12+	(16+)

Managerial career
- 1997–1998: Cameroon
Medal record
Men's football
Representing Cameroon
Africa Cup of Nations
Third place	1972 Cameroon
- * Club domestic league appearances and goals

Jean Manga Onguéné (12 June 1946 – 6 October 2026) was a Cameroonian footballer who played as forward. He was the 1980 African Footballer of the Year.

== Club career ==
Manga Onguéné spent his whole career at Canon Yaoundé in Cameroon.

== International career ==
Manga Onguéné made several appearances for the senior Cameroon national team, including in two Africa Cup of Nations in 1970 and 1972. He also played in four FIFA World Cup qualifying matches.

In 2006, he was selected by CAF as one of the best 200 African football players of the last 50 years.

== Death ==
Manga Onguéné died on 6 October 2026, at the age of 80.

== Honours ==
=== Player ===
Canon Yaoundé

- Cameroon Première Division: 1970, 1974, 1977, 1979, 1980, 1982
- Cameroon Cup: 1967, 1973, 1975, 1976, 1977, 1978
- African Cup of Champions Clubs: 1971, 1978, 1980
- African Cup Winners' Cup: 1979

Cameroon

- African Cup of Nations: 3rd place, 1972

=== Individual ===
- African Footballer of the Year: 1980
