= Jonas Bahamboula =

Congolese footballer

Jonas "Tostao" Bahamboula
Personal information
- Full name: Jonas Bahamboula Mbemba
- Date of birth: 2 February 1949 (age 77)
- Place of birth: Brazzaville, Middle Congo
- Position: Winger

Senior career*
| Years | Team | Apps | (Gls) |
| 1968–1987 | Diables Noirs | | |

International career
| 1969–1982 | People's Republic of the Congo | 56 | (13) |
Medal record
Men's football
Representing Congo
Africa Cup of Nations
| Winner | 1972 Cameroon |
- * Club domestic league appearances and goals

Jonas Bahamboula Mbemba (born 2 February 1949), nicknamed Tostao, is a former Congolese international football winger.

== Career ==
Born in Brazzaville, Bahamboula spent his entire career playing club football for local side Diables Noirs.

With the Congo national football team, Bahamboula won the 1972 African Cup of Nations. He also played at the 1974 and 1978 African Cup of Nations finals.

In 2006, he was selected by CAF as one of the best 200 African football players of the last 50 years.

== Honours ==
People's Republic of the Congo

- African Cup of Nations: 1972
