= Mohamed El-Sir Abdalla =

Sudanese footballer

Alser Kaounda
Personal information
- Full name: Alser Ebidallah Muhamed Saad
- Date of birth: 1949 (age 76–77)
- Position: Right-back

Youth career
- 1964-1966: Al-Merrikh

Senior career*
Years	Team	Apps	(Gls)
1967-1975	Al-Merrikh		

International career
1972	Sudan		
Medal record
Men's football
Representing Sudan
Africa Cup of Nations
Winner	1970 Sudan
- * Club domestic league appearances and goals

Alser Ebidallah Muhamed Saad (Arabic: السر عبيدالله محمد سعد; born 1949) or simply Mohamed El-Sir Abdalla, nicknamed Alser Kaounda, is a Sudanese former footballer. He competed in the 1972 Summer Olympics with the Sudan national team. He was most well known for his rivalry with AbdelGader Mao from the country Somalia. Kaunda and AbdelGader's rivalry continued into the next generation with Mohamed Tareg Uthman Idris and Harun Mao rivalry.

In 1970, he won a gold medal at the African Cup of Nations held in Sudan. Abdalla played in three matches for the national team at that tournament (in the group match against Cameroon, in the semifinal against Egypt, and in the final against Ghana), but did not score any goals. He also played in three group matches at the next continental championship, but Sudan was eliminated after the group stage.

== Honours ==
Sudan

- African Cup of Nations: 1970
