= Mohamed Abdel Fatah (footballer) =

Sudanese footballer

Zaghbir
Personal information
- Full name: Mohamed Abdel Fatah
- Date of birth: 1949 (age 76–77)
- Place of birth: Atbara, Sudan
- Height: 1.70 m (5 ft 7 in)
- Position: Goalkeeper

Youth career
- –1966: Al-Shate SC (Atbara)

Senior career*
Years	Team	Apps	(Gls)
1966–1967	Al-Shate SC (Atbara)	–	(–)
1967–1976	Al Hilal	–	(–)

International career
–	Sudan	–	(–)
Medal record
Men's football
Representing Sudan
Africa Cup of Nations
Winner	1970 Sudan
- * Club domestic league appearances and goals

Mohamed Abdel Fatah nicknamed Zaghbir (born 1949) is a Sudanese footballer who played as a goalkeeper. He competed in the 1972 Summer Olympics.

== Honours ==
Sudan

- African Cup of Nations: 1970
