= Paul Moukila =

Congolese footballer (1950–1992)

Personal information
- Date of birth: 6 June 1950
- Place of birth: Souanké, Middle Congo
- Date of death: 23 May 1992 (aged 41)
- Place of death: Meaux, France
- Height: 1.68 m (5 ft 6 in)
- Position: Attacking midfielder

Senior career*
Years	Team	Apps	(Gls)
1971–1975	CARA Brazzaville		
1975–1976	Strasbourg	4	(1)
1976–1978	CARA Brazzaville		
1981–1983	Stade Français		
1983–1985	CS Fontainebleau		
1985–1986	USM Malakoff		

International career
1970–1978	Republic of the Congo	31	(11)
Medal record
Men's football
Representing Congo
Africa Cup of Nations
Winner	1972 Cameroon
- * Club domestic league appearances and goals

Paul Moukila (6 June 1950 – 23 May 1992), nicknamed Sayal, was a footballer who played as an attacking midfielder. A Congolese international, he was winner of the 1974 African Footballer of the Year award.

== Career ==
Born in Souanké, Moukila began playing football for local side CARA Brazzaville. He played for the club from 1971 to 1975 and then from 1976 to 1978, after returning from a short spell abroad, at French club Strasbourg (1975–1976).

With the Congo national team, Moukila won the African Cup of Nations in 1972. He was later voted African Footballer of the Year in 1974.

In 2006, he was selected by CAF as one of the best 200 African football players of the last 50 years. Moukila was voted the IFFHS Player of the Century for the Republic of the Congo in 2000.

== Personal life ==
Moukila died in Meaux, France, from a bout of malaria on 23 May 1992.

His son Noël is also a former professional footballer and made two appearances for the Congo national team in 2007.

== Honours ==
People's Republic of the Congo

- African Cup of Nations: 1972
