= Norbert Owona =

Cameroonian footballer (1951–2021)

Personal information
- Date of birth: 1951
- Date of death: 3 February 2021 (aged 70)
- Place of death: Douala, Cameroon
- Position: Midfielder

Senior career*
Years	Team	Apps	(Gls)
- Union Douala

International career
196?–1972	Cameroon		
Medal record
Men's football
Representing Cameroon
Africa Cup of Nations
Third place	1972 Cameroon
- * Club domestic league appearances and goals

Norbert Owona (1951 – 3 February 2021) was a Cameroonian footballer who played as a midfielder for the Cameroon national team.

== Career ==
Owona scored against Nigeria during the 1970 FIFA World Cup qualification campaign. Owona was part of the team that finished in third place at the 1972 Africa Cup of Nations, scoring in third-place playoff against Zaire.

In August 2018, Owona featured in a television documentary showing that he was homeless and suffering from an inguinal hernia. Following the documentary, it was reported that Samuel Eto'o had arranged for Owona to have somewhere to live. Owona was found dead on a street in Douala, on 3 February 2021, a few days after his birthday. He was aged 70.

== Honours ==
Cameroon

- African Cup of Nations: 3rd place, 1972
