= François N'Doumbé =

Cameroonian footballer (born 1954)

Personal information
- Full name: François N'Doumbé Léa
- Date of birth: 30 January 1954 (age 72)
- Place of birth: Cameroon
- Position: Defender

Senior career*
Years	Team	Apps	(Gls)
1977–1982	Union Douala		

International career
1972–1985	Cameroon	49	(4)
Medal record
Men's football
Representing Cameroon
Africa Cup of Nations
Winner	1984 Ivory Coast
- * Club domestic league appearances and goals

François N'Doumbé Léa (born 30 January 1954) is a Cameroonian professional footballer who played as a defender. He was a non-playing squad member for the Cameroon national team at the 1982 FIFA World Cup. He also was part of the side that won the 1984 African Cup of Nations. At a club level he played for Union Douala in Cameroon.

== Honours ==
Cameroon

- African Cup of Nations: 1984

== See also ==
- 1982 FIFA World Cup squads
