= Mohammed Ali El Khider =

Sudanese footballer

Muhammed Safari
Personal information
- Full name: Muhamed Ali Alkhedr
- Date of birth: February 10, 1985 (age 41)
- Place of birth: Khartoum, Sudan
- Height: 1.82 m (6 ft 0 in)
- Position: Centre back

Senior career*
Years	Team	Apps	(Gls)
2002–2003	Ombada SC		
2003–2012	Al-Merrikh SC		
2013–2017	Al-Ahly Shendi		
2018	Hay Al Wadi SC		
2018	Al-Merrikh SC (Kosti)		

International career
2004–2015	Sudan	49	(2)
Medal record
Men's football
Representing Sudan
African Nations Championship
Third place	2011 Sudan
- * Club domestic league appearances and goals

Mohammed Ali El Khider (born 10 February 1985, in Khartoum) (known as Mohammed Safari) is a Sudanese footballer who plays for Al-Ahly Shendi.

== Career ==
The defender is known for his rough slide tackling and he plays at the heart of the defence.

== International career ==
He also plays for the Sudan National Team, usually wearing the number four shirt. He represented his country at multiple youth levels.

== Honours ==
Sudan

- African Nations Championship: 3rd place, 2011
