= Bushara Abdel-Nadief =

Sudanese footballer

Personal information
- Full name: Sanad Bushara Abdel-Nadief Abdalla
- Date of birth: 1947 (age 78–79)
- Place of birth: Kassala

Youth career
- 1963–1964: Faruk Omdurman

Senior career*
Years	Team	Apps	(Gls)
1964–1978	Al-Merrikh	–	(–)

International career
1967–1976	Sudan	–	(–)
Medal record
Men's football
Representing Sudan
Africa Cup of Nations
Winner	1970 Sudan
- * Club domestic league appearances and goals

Sanad Bushara Abdel-Nadief Abdalla (born 1947 in Kassala) is a Sudanese footballer who played as a midfielder. He competed in the 1972 Summer Olympics.

== Honours ==
Sudan

- African Cup of Nations: 1970
