= Ahmed Bushara Wahba =

Sudanese footballer

Bushra Wahba
Personal information
- Full name: Bushra Wahba Abadi Ahmed
- Date of birth: 23 July 1943 (age 83)
- Place of birth: Omdurman, Sudan
- Position: Midfielder

Team information
- Current team: VVA

Senior career*
Years	Team	Apps	(Gls)
1961	Al-Watan SC (Omdurman)		
1962	Al-Nil SC (Wad Madani)		
1963–1975	Al-Merrikh SC		

International career
1968-1972	Sudan		
Medal record
Men's football
Representing Sudan
Africa Cup of Nations
Winner	1970 Sudan
- * Club domestic league appearances and goals

Ahmed Bushara Wahba (born 1943) is a Sudanese footballer. He competed in the men's tournament at the 1972 Summer Olympics.

== Honours ==
Sudan

- African Cup of Nations: 1970
