= Hasabu El-Sagheir =

Sudanese footballer

Personal information
- Full name: Hasab El-Rasoul Omer Ali
- Date of birth: 1 July 1947 (age 79)
- Place of birth: Khartoum, Khartoum State, Sudan
- Position: Left winger

Senior career*
Years	Team	Apps	(Gls)
1964-1974	Burri SC		

International career
1965-1972	Sudan	40	(11)
Medal record
Men's football
Representing Sudan
Africa Cup of Nations
Winner	1970 Sudan
Arab Games
Silver medal – second place	1965 Cairo
- * Club domestic league appearances and goals

Hasab El-Rasoul Omer Ali nicknamed Hasabu El-Sagheir (born 1 July 1947) is a Sudanese footballer. He competed in the men's tournament at the 1972 Summer Olympics.

== Honours ==
Burri SC

- Sudan Premier League
- Champion: 1968

Sudan

- African Cup of Nations: 1970
- Arab Games: silver medalist: 1965

== International goals ==
#	Date	Venue	Opponent	Score	Result	Competition
1.2.3	4 September 1965	Cairo, Egypt	Muscat and Oman	15-0	Won	Football at the 1965 Pan Arab Games
4	12 January 1969	Addis Ababa, Ethiopia	Ethiopia	1-0	Won	Friendly
5	4 May 1969	Addis Ababa, Ethiopia	Ethiopia	1-1	Draw	1970 FIFA World Cup qualification (CAF)
6	6 February 1970	Khartoum, Sudan	Ethiopia	3-0	Won	1970 African Cup of Nations
7	10 February 1970	Khartoum, Sudan	Cameroon	2-1	Won	1970 African Cup of Nations
8	16 February 1970	Khartoum, Sudan	Ghana	1-0	Won	1970 African Cup of Nations
9	25 February 1972	Douala, Cameroon	Zaire	1-1	Draw	1972 African Cup of Nations
10	2 May 1972	Addis Ababa, Ethiopia	Ethiopia	2-2	Draw	Football at the 1972 Summer Olympics - Men's African Qualifiers
11	7 May 1972	Khartoum, Sudan	Madagascar	3-0	Won	Football at the 1972 Summer Olympics - Men's African Qualifiers
