= Kidian Diallo =

Malian footballer and manager

Personal information
- Date of birth: January 1, 1944 (age 82)
- Place of birth: Niéna, French Sudan
- Height: 1.75 m (5 ft 9 in)
- Position: Midfielder

Senior career*
Years	Team	Apps	(Gls)
1963–1966	Djoliba		
1966–1972	Bamako		

International career
1965–1973	Mali	33	(0)

Managerial career
- 1982–1989: Mali
- * Club domestic league appearances and goals as of 21:33, 26 March 2021 (UTC)

Kidian Diallo (born 1 January 1944) is a Malian former professional football manager, and player who played as a midfielder. As a player, he represented the Mali national team, and he managed them from 1982 to 1989.
