= Jean-Paul Akono =

Cameroonian footballer and coach

Personal information
- Date of birth: 1 January 1952 (age 74)
- Place of birth: Yaoundé, Cameroon
- Position: Midfielder

Senior career*
Years	Team	Apps	(Gls)
1979–1980	Canon Yaoundé		

International career
1972–1973	Cameroon		

Managerial career
- 2000: Cameroon Olympics
- 2001: Cameroon
- 2002–2003: Chad
- 2012–2013: Cameroon
Medal record
Men's football
Representing Cameroon
Africa Cup of Nations
Third place	1972 Cameroon
- * Club domestic league appearances and goals

Jean-Paul Akono (born 1 January 1952) is a Cameroonian football coach and former player.

== Early and personal life ==
Akono was born on 1 January 1952 in Yaoundé.

== Playing career ==
Akono played for Cameroon at international level, participating in the 1972 African Cup of Nations, and appearing in one FIFA World Cup qualifying match in 1973. He played club football for Canon Yaoundé between 1979 and 1980.

== Coaching career ==
Akono was in charge of Cameroon at the 2000 Summer Olympics.

He was appointed to manage the Cameroon national team on an interim basis in September 2012. In April 2013 it was announced that the Cameroonian Football Federation had begun the process of finding a permanent replacement for Akono. Akono later stated he was "shocked and embarrassed" that they were replacing him, and that he would not be applying for the job on a permanent basis. The Cameroonian Football Federation later announced that Akono would remain in charge for forthcoming World Cup qualifying matches in June 2013, although they would continue their search for a replacement due to Akono's illness; he was replaced by German Volker Finke a few days later.

== Honours ==
Cameroon

- African Cup of Nations: 3rd place, 1972
