= Edmond Apéti Kaolo =

Togolese footballer

Docteur Kaolo
Personal information
- Full name: Edmond Kossivi Apéti
- Date of birth: c.1946
- Place of birth: Tsévié, Togo
- Date of death: 2 July 1972
- Place of death: Lomé, Togo
- Position: Forward

Senior career*
Years	Team	Apps	(Gls)
–1972	Étoile Filante du Togo		

International career
- Togo
- * Club domestic league appearances and goals

Edmond Kossivi Apéti nicknamed Docteur Kaolo, was an international Togolese football player.

During his time with Étoile Filante, he reached the final of the African Cup of Champions Clubs in 1968. He played in the 1972 African Cup of Nations, scoring twice against Mali in their opening game and once more against Kenya. He died in a motorcycle collision in July 1972.

A tournament was held in his name during August 2014.
