= Jonathan Niva =

Kenyan footballer (1942–2001)

Personal information
- Date of birth: 16 May 1942
- Place of birth: Burundu, Kenya
- Date of death: 12 May 2001 (aged 58)
- Position: Defender

Senior career*
| Years | Team | Apps | (Gls) |
| 1966–1970 | Abaluhya United | | |
| 1972 | Gor Mahia | | |
| 1973–1977 | Abaluhya United | | |

International career
| 1965–1976 | Kenya | 88 | (10) |

Managerial career
- 1972: Kenya
- * Club domestic league appearances and goals

Jonathan Niva (16 May 1942 – 12 May 2001) was a Kenyan international footballer who played as a defender. He made 88 appearances for the Kenya national football team, scoring twice. He had a spell as player-manager of the Kenya national football team in 1972. He retired as a player in 1978. He is the grandfather of Rwandan footballer Yves Rubasha.
