= Jean-Michel M'Bono =

Congolese footballer (born 1946)

Personal information
- Full name: Jean-Michel M'Bono
- Date of birth: 27 January 1946 (age 80)
- Place of birth: Brazzaville, Middle Congo
- Position: Forward

Senior career*
Years	Team	Apps	(Gls)
1960–1962	Caïman Brazzaville		
1962–1963	AS Dragons Pointe-Noire		
1963–?	Étoile du Congo		

International career
1968-1975	Congo	8+	(11+)
Medal record
Men's football
Representing Congo
Africa Cup of Nations
Winner	1972 Cameroon
- * Club domestic league appearances and goals

Jean-Paul M'Bono (born 27 January 1946) is a former Congo international football forward.

== Career ==
Born in Brazzaville, M'Bono began playing club football for local side Caïman Brazzaville. After a brief spell with AS Dragons, he joined Étoile du Congo where he would spend the rest of his club career. He won the African Golden Boot in 1972.

M'Bono made several appearances for the senior Congo national football team, including FIFA World Cup qualifying matches, and he played at the 1972 African Cup of Nations finals, where he would score four goals as Congo won the championship.

After retiring from playing, M'Bono went into football administration, eventually becoming the President of the Congolese Football Federation in 2010.

== Honours ==
People's Republic of the Congo

- African Cup of Nations: 1972
