= Fantamady Keita =

Malian footballer

Personal information
- Full name: Cheick Fantamady Keita
- Date of birth: 25 September 1949
- Place of birth: Bamako, Mali
- Height: 1.83 m (6 ft 0 in)
- Position: Striker

Senior career*
| Years | Team | Apps | (Gls) |
| 1969–1972 | Real Bamako | | |
| 1972–1975 | Rennes | 52 | (15) |
| 1975–1976 | Angoulême | 12 | (4) |
| 1976–1977 | Pontevedra | 17 | (7) |
| 1979–1982 | Chaumont | | |

International career
- Mali
- * Club domestic league appearances and goals

Fantamady Keita (born 25 September 1949) is a Malian former professional footballer who played as a striker. A Malian international, he was the leading scorer in the 1972 African Cup of Nations, scoring five goals as Mali reached the final.

== Career ==
Keita began his playing career with AS Real Bamako, before he went on to spend three years (1972–1975) in France with Stade Rennais. He also had a spells with AS Angoulême and ECAC Chaumont.

In 2006, he was selected by CAF as one of the best 200 African football players of the last 50 years.
