= Bako Touré =

Malian footballer

Personal information
- Full name: Bassidiki Touré
- Date of birth: 7 December 1939
- Place of birth: Bamako, Mali
- Date of death: 28 April 2001 (aged 61)
- Place of death: Bamako, Mali]
- Height: 1.80 m (5 ft 11 in)
- Position: Forward

Youth career
- –1956: ASPTT Bamako
- 1956–1957: Jeanne d'Arc de Bamako

Senior career*
Years	Team	Apps	(Gls)
1957–1958	ASPTT Nice		
1958–1959	Marseille	31	(8)
1959–1960	Toulouse	22	(9)
1960–1961	Nancy	17	(1)
1961–1962	Toulon	30	(12)
1962–1963	Limoges	26	(15)
1963–1964	Nancy		
1964–1966	Nantes		
1966–1968	Ajaccio	52	(17)
1968–1975	Blois		

International career
1960–1972	Mali	?	(?)
- * Club domestic league appearances and goals

Bassidiki Touré (7 December 1939 – 28 April 2001), commonly known as Bako Touré, was a Mali international football forward who played for clubs in Mali and France.

== Playing career ==
Born in Bamako, Touré began playing club football for local sides ASPTT Bamako and Jeanne d'Arc de Bamako.

In 1957, Touré moved to France and joined ASPTT Nice. He would soon play for Ligue 1 sides Olympique de Marseille, Toulouse FC and AS Nancy.

After a spell playing in Ligue 2, he joined FC Nantes and would win Ligue 1 during 1965.

Touré made several appearances for the senior Mali national football team and participated in the 1972 African Cup of Nations finals, where Mali placed second.

== Personal life ==
Touré is the father of French international and Olympic footballer José Touré. Touré died at age 61 on 28 April 2001.
