= François M'Pelé =

Congolese footballer

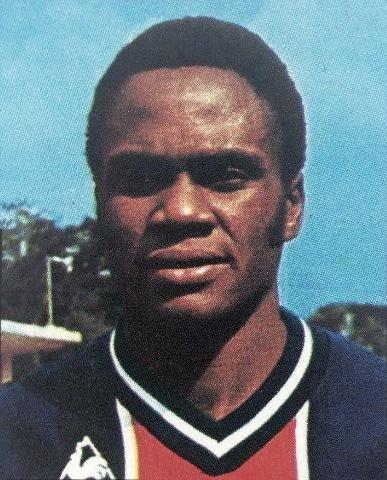
- M'Pelé with Paris Saint-Germain in 1978

Personal information
- Date of birth: 13 July 1947 (age 79)
- Place of birth: Brazzaville, Middle Congo
- Height: 1.78 m (5 ft 10 in)
- Position: Forward

Senior career*
Years	Team	Apps	(Gls)
1966–1968	Standard de Brazzaville	56	(63)
1968–1973	Ajaccio	149	(71)
1973–1979	Paris Saint-Germain	217	(97)
1979–1981	Lens	65	(16)
1981–1982	Rennes	34	(16)
Total		521	(263)

International career
1971–1978	Congo	29	(12)
Medal record
Men's football
Representing Congo
Africa Cup of Nations
Winner	1972 Cameroon
- * Club domestic league appearances and goals

François M'Pelé (born 13 July 1947) is a Congolese former professional footballer who played as a forward. In 2006, he was selected by CAF as one of the best 200 African football players of the last 50 years.

== Career ==
M'Pelé played professional football in Ligue 1 with Paris Saint-Germain, Lens and Rennes. He played for PSG from 1973 to 1979, and as of 2014, was the club's eighth-highest goalscorer with 95 in all competitions. M'Pelé was also PSG's all-time leading goalscorer in the Coupe de France with 28 goals, until Kylian Mbappé surpassed him in January 2024.

== Honours ==
People's Republic of the Congo

- African Cup of Nations: 1972
