= 1972 African Cup of Nations =

8th edition of the Africa Cup of Nations

Coupe d'Afrique des Nations 1972

Tournament details
- Host country: Cameroon
- Dates: 23 February – 5 March
- Teams: 8
- Venues: 2 (in 2 host cities)

Final positions
- Champions: Congo (1st title)
- Runners-up: Mali
- Third place: Cameroon
- Fourth place: Zaire

Tournament statistics
- Matches played: 16
- Goals scored: 53 (3.31 per match)
- Attendance: 425,000 (26,563 per match)
- Top scorer(s): (Mali) Fantamady Keita (5 goals)
- Best player: (Republic of the Congo) François M'Pelé

The 1972 African Cup of Nations was the eighth edition of the African Cup of Nations, the international football championship run by the Confederation of African Football (CAF). It was hosted by Cameroon, in the cities of Yaoundé and Douala. Just like in 1970, the field of eight teams was split into two groups of four. The People's Republic of the Congo won its first championship, beating Mali in the final 3−2.

== Qualified teams ==
For the first time, Ethiopia did not compete. The 8 qualified teams are:

Team	Qualified as	Qualified on	Previous appearances in tournament (Note: Bold indicates champion for that year, Italic indicates host.)
Cameroon	Hosts		1 (1970)
Sudan	Holders	16 February 1970	4 (1957, 1959, 1963, **1970**)
Morocco	2nd round winners	16 April 1971	0 (debut)
Togo	2nd round winners	20 June 1971	0 (debut)
Mali	2nd round winners	27 June 1971	0 (debut)
Congo	2nd round winners	18 July 1971	1 (1968)
Kenya	2nd round winners	18 July 1971	0 (debut)
Zaire	2nd round winners	27 October 1971	3 (1965, **1968**, 1970)

== Venues ==
The competition was played in two venues in Yaoundé and Douala.

Yaoundé	1972 African Cup of Nations is located in Cameroon
Stade Omnisports	1972 African Cup of Nations is located in Cameroon
Capacity: **38,720**	1972 African Cup of Nations is located in Cameroon
Douala	1972 African Cup of Nations is located in Cameroon
Stade de la Réunification	1972 African Cup of Nations is located in Cameroon
Capacity: **30,000**	1972 African Cup of Nations is located in Cameroon

== Group stage ==
=== Tiebreakers ===
If two or more teams finished level on points after completion of the group matches, the following tie-breakers were used to determine the final ranking:

1. Goal difference in all group matches
2. Greater number of goals scored in all group matches
3. Drawing of lots

=== Group A ===
Pos	Team	Pld	W	D	L	GF	GA	GD	Pts	Qualification
1	Cameroon (H)	3	2	1	0	5	2	+3	**5**	Advance to knockout stage
2	Mali	3	0	3	0	5	5	0	**3**	Advance to knockout stage
3	Kenya	3	0	2	1	3	4	−1	**2**	
4	Togo	3	0	2	1	4	6	−2	**2**	

Rules for classification: Group stage tiebreakers
(H) Hosts
23 February 1972

Cameroon	2–1	Kenya
N'Doga 7'; N'Dongo 20'		Niva 44'

Stade Omnisports, Yaoundé
Attendance: 40,000
Referee: Abdelkader Ben Jelloun (Morocco)
24 February 1972

Mali	3–3	Togo
B Traoré 10'; F. Keita 46'; B. Touré 49'		Kaolo 45' (pen.), 60'; Adé 81'

Stade Omnisports, Yaoundé
Attendance: 45,000
Referee: Andre Bernard Ickias (Congo)

26 February 1972

Mali	1–1	Kenya
F. Keita 45'		Nicodémus 60'

Stade Omnisports, Yaoundé
Attendance: 45,000
Referee: Pierre Mutombo (Zaire)
26 February 1972

Cameroon	2–0	Togo
Maya 64'; Mvé 79'

Stade Omnisports, Yaoundé
Attendance: 45,000
Referee: Babikr Eissa (Sudan)

28 February 1972

Togo	1–1	Kenya
Kaolo 60'		Pelé Ouma 30'

Stade Omnisports, Yaoundé
Attendance: 45,000
Referee: Abdelkader Aouissi (Algeria)
28 February 1972

Cameroon	1–1	Mali
N'Doumbé 67'		F. Keita 43'

Stade Omnisports, Yaoundé
Attendance: 45,000
Referee: Mostafa Kamel (Egypt)

=== Group B ===
Pos	Team	Pld	W	D	L	GF	GA	GD	Pts	Qualification
1	Zaire	3	1	2	0	4	2	+2	**4**	Advance to knockout stage
2	Congo	3	1	1	1	5	5	0	**3**	Advance to knockout stage
3	Morocco	3	0	3	0	3	3	0	**3**	
4	Sudan	3	0	2	1	4	6	−2	**2**	

Rules for classification: Group stage tiebreakers
25 February 1972

Congo	1–1	Morocco
Moukila 45'		Faras 34'

Stade de la Réunification, Douala
Attendance: 15,000
Referee: Alfred Olimba (Kenya)
25 February 1972

Zaire	1–1	Sudan
Mayanga 53'		Hasabu El-Sagheer 55'

Stade de la Réunification, Douala
Attendance: 5,000
Referee: Sané Mady Diallo (Mali)

27 February 1972

Morocco	1–1	Sudan
Faras 32'		Abdel-Nadief 49'

Stade de la Réunification, Douala
Attendance: 7,000
Referee: Michael Wacka (Cameroon)
27 February 1972

Zaire	2–0	Congo
N'Tumba 16', 59'

Stade de la Réunification, Douala
Attendance: 7,000
Referee: Théodore Laclé (Togo)

29 February 1972

Morocco	1–1	Zaire
Faras 36'		Mayanga 3'

Stade de la Réunification, Douala
Attendance: 20,000
Referee: Robert Foiret (Mauritius)
29 February 1972

Congo	4–2	Sudan
M'Bono 8', 55'; M'Pelé 32'; Bahamboula 46'		Kamal 37'; Wahba 44'

Stade de la Réunification, Douala
Attendance: 20,000
Referee: George Lamptey (Ghana)

== Knockout stage ==
=== Bracket ===
Semi-finals
2 March – Yaoundé
Cameroon	0
**Congo**	**1**
2 March – Douala
Zaire	3
**Mali (a.e.t.)**	**4**

Final
5 March – Yaoundé
**Congo**	**3**
Mali	2
Third place
4 March – Yaoundé
**Cameroon**	**5**
Zaire	2

=== Semi-finals ===
2 March 1972

Cameroon	0–1	Congo
		Minga 31'

Stade Omnisports, Yaoundé
Attendance: 40,000
Referee: Mostafa Kamel (Egypt)

2 March 1972

Zaire	3–4 (a.e.t.)	Mali
N'Tumba 6'; Etepé 61'; Ngassebe 78'		A. Traoré 17'; F. Keita 48', 92'; B. Touré 68'

Stade de la Réunification, Douala
Attendance: 2,000
Referee: George Lamptey (Ghana)

=== Third place match ===
4 March 1972

Cameroon	5–2	Zaire
Akono 4' (pen.); N'Dongo 31'; Owona 32'; Mouthé 34'; N'Doga 42'		Etepé 13'; Mayanga 17'

Stade Omnisports, Yaoundé
Attendance: 4,000
Referee: George Lamptey (Ghana)

=== Final ===
5 March 1972

Congo	3–2	Mali
M'Bono 57', 59'; M'Pelé 63'		Diakhité 42'; M. Traoré 75'

Stade Omnisports, Yaoundé
Attendance: 40,000
Referee: Abdelkader Aouissi (Algeria)

== Goalscorers ==
There were 53 goals scored in 16 matches, for an average of 3.31 goals per match.

5 goals

- (Mali) Fantamady Keita

4 goals

- (Republic of the Congo) Jean-Michel M'Bono

3 goals

- (Morocco) Ahmed Faras
- (Togo) Edmond Apéti Kaolo
- (Zaire) Mayanga Maku
- (Zaire) Jean Kalala N'Tumba

2 goals

- (Cameroon) Jean-Baptiste N'Doga
- (Cameroon) Paul-Gaston N'Dongo
- (Republic of the Congo) François M'Pelé
- (Mali) Bako Touré
- (Zaire) Kakoko Etepé

1 goal

- (Cameroon) Jean Paul Akono
- (Cameroon) Simo Emmanuel Mvé
- (Cameroon) François N'Doumbe
- (Cameroon) Joseph Yegba Maya
- (Cameroon) Philippe Michel Mouthé
- (Cameroon) Norbert Owona
- (Republic of the Congo) Jonas Bahamboula
- (Republic of the Congo) Noël Minga
- (Republic of the Congo) Paul Moukila
- (Kenya) Daniel Arudhi Nicodémus
- (Kenya) Jonathan Niva
- (Kenya) Peter "Pelé" Ouma
- (Mali) Adama Traoré
- (Mali) Bakary Traoré
- (Mali) Moussa Diakhité
- (Mali) Moussa Traoré
- (Sudan) Bushara Abdel-Nadief
- (Sudan) Kamal Abdel Wahab
- (Sudan) Hasabu El-Sagheer
- (Sudan) Ahmed Bushara Wahba
- (Togo) Covi Adé
- (Zaire) Gary Ngassebe

== Team of the Tournament ==
Goalkeeper	Defenders	Midfielders	Forwards
(Morocco) Allal Ben Kassou	(Sudan) Mohamed El-Sir Abdalla (Zaire) Bwanga Tshimen (Cameroon) Paul N'lend (Morocco) Boujemaa Benkhrif	(Zaire) Mayanga Maku (Republic of the Congo) Noël Minga-Tchibinda (Cameroon) Paul-Gaston N'Dongo (Cameroon) Jean-Pierre Tokoto	(Zaire) Kakoko Etepé (Republic of the Congo) François M'Pelé
