= 1974 African Cup of Nations squads =

This is a list of the squads which played in the 1974 African Cup of Nations.

== Group A ==
=== Egypt ===
Trainer: (West Germany) Dettmar Cramer

No.	Pos.	Player	Date of birth (age)	Caps	Goals	Club
	GK	Hassan Ali	29 December 1949 (aged 24)			(Egyptian Football Association) Tersana SC
22	GK	Hassan Orabi	21 October 1947 (aged 26)			(Egyptian Football Association) Al Ittihad Alexandria
	GK	Ekramy El-Shahat	14 October 1954 (aged 19)			(Egyptian Football Association) Al Ahly
	DF	Mohamed Aboul Ezz	1945			(Egyptian Football Association) Tersana SC
	DF	Mohamed El-Seyagy	20 January 1949 (aged 25)			(Egyptian Football Association) Ghazl El Mahalla
	DF	Abdel-Karim El-Gohary	1947			(Egyptian Football Association) Zamalek
	DF	Hany Moustafa	27 October 1947 (aged 26)			(Egyptian Football Association) Al Ahly
	DF	Hassan Darwish	5 August 1951 (aged 22)			(Egyptian Football Association) Ismaily SC
	DF	Mohamed Tawfik				(Egyptian Football Association) Zamalek
	DF	Mohamed Abou Amin	22 August 1950 (aged 23)			(Egyptian Football Association) Ismaily SC
	MF	Raafat Mekki	13 January 1949 (aged 25)			(Egyptian Football Association) Tersana SC
	MF	Taha Basry	2 October 1946 (aged 27)			(Kuwait Football Association) Al-Arabi SC
	MF	Gamal Abdel-Azim	13 April 1949 (aged 24)			(Egyptian Football Association) Canal SC
	MF	Shehta El Iskandarani				
	MF	Hassan Shehata	19 June 1947 (aged 26)			(Egyptian Football Association) Zamalek
	MF	Farouk Gaafar	29 October 1952 (aged 21)			(Egyptian Football Association) Zamalek
	FW	Hassan El-Shazly	13 November 1943 (aged 30)			(Egyptian Football Association) Tersana SC
	FW	Sayed Abdelrazek	1946			(Egyptian Football Association) Ismaily SC
	FW	Ali Abo Gresha	29 November 1947 (aged 26)			(Egyptian Football Association) Ismaily SC
	FW	Ali Khalil	28 November 1952 (aged 21)			(Egyptian Football Association) Zamalek
	FW	Mahmoud El Khatib	30 October 1954 (aged 19)			(Egyptian Football Association) Al Ahly
	FW	Moustafa Abdou	10 June 1953 (aged 20)			(Egyptian Football Association) Al Ahly
	FW	Ossama Khalil	5 February 1954 (aged 20)			(Egyptian Football Association) Ismaily SC

=== Uganda ===
Trainer: (West Germany) Otto Westerhoff

No.	Pos.	Player	Date of birth (age)	Caps	Goals	Club
	GK	Patrick Nathan				(Federation of Uganda Football Associations)
	GK	Joseph Masajjage				(Federation of Uganda Football Associations) Express
	DF	Ahmed Doka	1951			(Federation of Uganda Football Associations) Simba
	DF	Jimmy Kirunda	1950			(Federation of Uganda Football Associations) Kampala City Council
	DF	Ashe Mukasa	April 1952			(Federation of Uganda Football Associations) Express
	DF	Wilson Nsobya				(Federation of Uganda Football Associations) Police
	DF	Edward Semwanga				(Federation of Uganda Football Associations)
	MF	Denis Obua	13 June 1947 (aged 26)			(Federation of Uganda Football Associations) Police
	MF	Timothy Ayiekho	1954			(Federation of Uganda Football Associations) Express
	MF	Peter Kirumira				(Federation of Uganda Football Associations) Express
	FW	Abbey Nasur	1952			(Federation of Uganda Football Associations) Prisons
	FW	Francis Kulabigwo	1944			(Federation of Uganda Football Associations) Simba
	FW	Stanley Mubiru				(Federation of Uganda Football Associations) Express
	FW	Phillip Omondi	1957			(Federation of Uganda Football Associations) Kampala City Council

=== Zambia ===
Trainer: (Socialist Federal Republic of Yugoslavia) Ante Bušelić

No.	Pos.	Player	Date of birth (age)	Caps	Goals	Club
	GK	Emmanuel Mwape	1 January 1950 (aged 24)			(Football Association of Zambia) Roan United
	DF	Dick Chama	11 February 1946 (aged 28)			(Football Association of Zambia) Zambian Army FC
	DF	Kaiser Kalambo	6 July 1953 (aged 20)			(Football Association of Zambia) Ndola United
	DF	Dickson Makwaza	15 July 1942 (aged 31)			(Football Association of Zambia) Mufulira Wanderers
	DF	Edwin Mbaso	1953			(Football Association of Zambia) Ndola United
	DF	Ackim Musenge	6 October 1949 (aged 24)			(Football Association of Zambia) Mufulira Wanderers
	MF	Bernard Chanda	1 January 1952 (aged 22)			(Football Association of Zambia) Rokana United
	MF	Freddie Mwila	6 July 1946 (aged 27)			(Football Association of Zambia) Ndola United
	MF	Patrick Nkole	1 January 1900 (aged 74)			(Football Association of Zambia) Mufulira Wanderers
	MF	Willy Phiri	1 January 1900 (aged 74)			(Football Association of Zambia) Nchanga Rangers
	MF	Stone Chibwe	12 June 1949 (aged 24)			(Football Association of Zambia) Rokana United
	MF	Richard Stephenson	2 August 1949 (aged 24)			(Football Association of Zambia) Kabwe Warriors
	MF	Jan Simulambo	1 January 1900 (aged 74)			(Football Association of Zambia) Zambian Army FC
	MF	Boniface Simutowe	13 October 1949 (aged 24)			(Football Association of Zambia) Kabwe Warriors
	FW	Godfrey Chitalu	22 October 1947 (aged 26)			(Football Association of Zambia) Kabwe Warriors
	FW	Simon Kaushi	2 October 1950 (aged 23)			(Football Association of Zambia) Mufulira Blackpool
	FW	Joseph Mapulanga				(Football Association of Zambia) Roan United
	FW	Brighton Sinyangwe				(Football Association of Zambia) Rokana United
	FW	Obby Kapita	1 January 1952 (aged 22)			(Football Association of Zambia) Zambian Army FC

=== Ivory Coast ===
Trainer: (Brazil) William Kepler Santa Rosa

No.	Pos.	Player	Date of birth (age)	Caps	Goals	Club
	GK	Marc Gohi				(Ivorian Football Federation) ASEC Mimosas
	DF	Denis Gnégnéry	1946			(Ivorian Football Federation)
	DF	André Obrou				(Ivorian Football Federation)
	DF	Adama Doumbia				(Ivorian Football Federation) Stade d'Abidjan
	DF	Mama Ouattara	22 June 1951 (aged 22)			(French Football Federation) Montpellier
	DF	Jean-Baptiste Akassou Akran				(Ivorian Football Federation)
	MF	Alphonse Yoro	1945			(Ivorian Football Federation)
	MF	Kobenan Kouman				(Ivorian Football Federation) ASC Bouaké
	MF	Emmanuel Moh	14 April 1949 (aged 24)			(Ivorian Football Federation) Africa Sports
	MF	Soma Sagnaba				(Ivorian Football Federation) Stade d'Abidjan
	FW	François Tahi	28 May 1950 (aged 23)			(Ivorian Football Federation)
	FW	Noel Kouamé				(Ivorian Football Federation)
	FW	Irié Bi Gohi				(Ivorian Football Federation)
	FW	Laurent Pokou	10 August 1947 (aged 26)			(French Football Federation) Stade Rennais
	FW	Valentin Bouazo				(Ivorian Football Federation) ASEC Mimosas
	FW	Bernard Nguéssan				(Ivorian Football Federation) ASEC Mimosas

== Group B ==
=== Zaire ===
Trainer: (Socialist Federal Republic of Yugoslavia) Blagoje Vidinić

No.	Pos.	Player	Date of birth (age)	Caps	Goals	Club
1	GK	Mwamba Kazadi	6 March 1947 (aged 26)			(Congolese Association Football Federation) TP Mazembe
12	GK	Tubilandu Ndimbi	15 March 1948 (aged 25)			(Congolese Association Football Federation) AS Vita Club
5	DF	Lobilo Boba	10 April 1950 (aged 23)			(Congolese Association Football Federation) AS Vita Club
4	DF	Bwanga Tshimen	4 January 1949 (aged 25)			(Congolese Association Football Federation) TP Mazembe
2	DF	Mwepu Ilunga	22 August 1949 (aged 24)			(Congolese Association Football Federation) TP Mazembe
9	MF	Kembo Uba Kembo	27 November 1947 (aged 26)			(Congolese Association Football Federation) AS Vita Club
3	MF	Kafula Ngoie	11 November 1945 (aged 28)			(Congolese Association Football Federation) TP Mazembe
7	MF	Kibonge Mafu	12 February 1945 (aged 29)			(Congolese Association Football Federation) AS Vita Club
8	MF	Mavuba Mafuila	15 December 1949 (aged 24)			(Congolese Association Football Federation) AS Vita Club
14	MF	Mayanga Maku	31 October 1948 (aged 25)			(Congolese Association Football Federation) AS Vita Club
10	MF	Kidumu Mantantu	17 November 1946 (aged 27)			(Congolese Association Football Federation) SC Imana
	DF	Mwanza Mukombo	17 November 1945 (aged 28)			(Congolese Association Football Federation) TP Mazembe
	MF	Kamunda Tshinabu	8 May 1946 (aged 27)			(Congolese Association Football Federation) TP Mazembe
	MF	Taty Mbungu	1 October 1954 (aged 19)			(Congolese Association Football Federation) AS Vita Club
	FW	Mbungu Ekofa	24 November 1948 (aged 25)			(Congolese Association Football Federation) SC Imana
11	FW	Kakoko Etepé	22 November 1950 (aged 23)			(Congolese Association Football Federation) SC Imana
6	MF	Mana Mamuwene	10 October 1947 (aged 26)			(Congolese Association Football Federation) SC Imana
13	FW	Ndaye Mulamba	4 November 1948 (aged 25)			(Congolese Association Football Federation) AS Vita Club

=== Guinea ===
Trainer: (Hungary) László Budai

No.	Pos.	Player	Date of birth (age)	Caps	Goals	Club
	GK	Abdoulaye Camara				(Guinean Football Federation)
	DF	Jacob Bangoura	1945			(Guinean Football Federation) Hafia
	DF	Sékou Condé	1943			(Guinean Football Federation)
	DF	Ali Badara Keita				(Guinean Football Federation)
	MF	Mamadou Camara	1952			(Guinean Football Federation)
	MF	Ousmane Thiam				(Guinean Football Federation)
	MF	Naby Laye Camara	1952			(Guinean Football Federation) Hafia
	MF	Mamadou Aliou Keïta	1952			(Guinean Football Federation) Hafia
	FW	Soriba Soumah	1946			(Guinean Football Federation) Hafia
	FW	Ibrahima Kéita	1945			(Guinean Football Federation) Hafia
	FW	Bangaly Sylla	1951			(Guinean Football Federation) Hafia
	FW	Chérif Souleymane	20 October 1944 (aged 29)			(Guinean Football Federation) Hafia

=== Congo ===
Coach: (Republic of the Congo) Robert Ndoudi

No.	Pos.	Player	Date of birth (age)	Caps	Goals	Club
1	GK	Paul Tandou	13 July 1947 (aged 26)			(Congolese Football Federation) CARA Brazzaville
	GK	Maxime Matsima	18 November 1940 (aged 33)			(Congolese Football Federation) Diables Noirs
2	DF	Gabriel Dengaki	7 November 1952 (aged 21)			(Congolese Football Federation) CARA Brazzaville
16	DF	François Yamba				(Congolese Football Federation)
	DF	Marcel Koko				(Congolese Football Federation)
3	DF	Gaston N'Ganga-Muivi				(Congolese Football Federation) CARA Brazzaville
4	DF	Jacques-Yvon Ndolou	3 May 1944 (aged 29)			(Congolese Football Federation) Inter Club Brazzaville
5	DF	Joseph Ngassaki	8 November 1941 (aged 32)			(Congolese Football Federation) CARA Brazzaville
	MF	André Mbouta-Bella				(Congolese Football Federation) CARA Brazzaville
13	MF	Jonas Bahamboula	2 February 1949 (aged 25)			(Congolese Football Federation) Diables Noirs
	MF	Noël Minga	12 July 1947 (aged 26)			(Congolese Football Federation) Inter Club Brazzaville
	MF	Felix Ondono				(Congolese Football Federation)
14	MF	Jean-Jacques N'Domba	1953 or 1954			(Congolese Football Federation) Étoile du Congo
	FW	Jean-Michel M'Bono	27 January 1946 (aged 28)			(Congolese Football Federation) Étoile du Congo
10	FW	Paul Moukila	6 June 1950 (aged 23)			(Congolese Football Federation) CARA Brazzaville
	FW	François M'Pelé	13 July 1947 (aged 26)			(French Football Federation) Paris Saint-Germain
11	FW	Sébastien Lakou	1946 or 1947			(Congolese Football Federation) CARA Brazzaville
	FW	Jean-Bertrand Balékita	6 January 1948 (aged 26)			(French Football Federation) Montpellier HSC
	FW	Augustin Ndouli				(Congolese Football Federation)
8	FW	Gilbert Poaty	1947			(Congolese Football Federation) CARA Brazzaville

=== Mauritius ===
Trainer: Mohammad Anwar Elahee

No.	Pos.	Player	Date of birth (age)	Caps	Goals	Club
1	GK	Lucien Leste	1952			(Mauritius Football Association) Police Club
3	DF	Jean Florine	1949	13	0	(Mauritius Football Association) Fire Brigade
	DF	Jean-Sylvio Jatha				(Mauritius Football Association) Police Club
4	DF	Raoul Maurel		8	0	(Mauritius Football Association) FC Dodo
6	DF	Louis-Roland Augustin				(Mauritius Football Association) Police Club
5	DF	Parmanand Ramchurn				(Mauritius Football Association) Hindu Cadets
21	MF	Chow Chinsung				
	MF	Anwar Jackaria				(Mauritius Football Association) Muslim Scouts Club
16	MF	David Bathfield	25 November 1953 (aged 20)			(Mauritius Football Association) FC Dodo
2	MF	Robert Espitalier Noël	1944	11	0	(Mauritius Football Association) FC Dodo
	MF	Cassam Mooniaruck				(Mauritius Football Association) Muslim Scouts Club
7	MF	Shyam Oodunt				(Mauritius Football Association) Hindu Cadets
	MF	France-Michel Moutou	1951	14	1	(Mauritius Football Association) Police Club
	FW	Patrice-Alain Perdrau	25 June 1951 (aged 22)			(Mauritius Football Association) Racing Club
9	FW	Daniel Imbert	17 December 1952 (aged 21)	16	7	(Mauritius Football Association) Racing Club
10	FW	Serge-René Munso	1942			(Mauritius Football Association) Police Club
