= DR Congo at the FIFA World Cup =

International football delegation

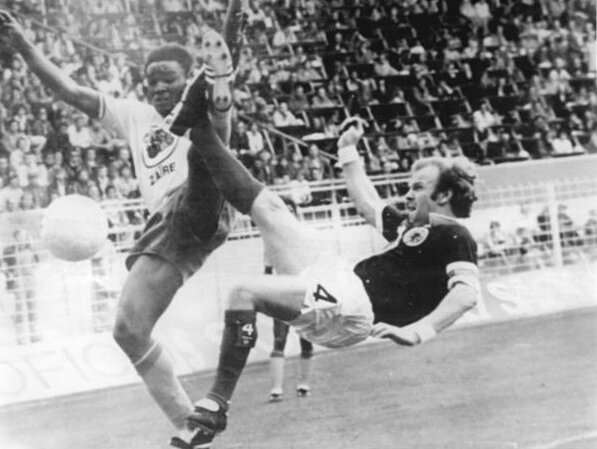
Zaire's first ever FIFA World Cup match against Scotland

DR Congo national football team (formerly the Zaire national football team) have appeared in the FIFA World Cup on two occasions. They first appeared in 1974 when they were known as Zaire. They were the first Sub-Saharan African team to participate in a World Cup. Despite respectable performances against Scotland and Brazil they were defeated in all three matches with a total goal difference of 0–14.

After 52 years, DR Congo competed in their second tournament, the 2026 FIFA World Cup. They enjoyed more success than they did in 1974, reaching the round of 32.

== Context ==
In the late 1960s and early 1970s, Zairian dictator Mobutu Sese Seko invested heavily in the national football team. It led to continental success, with Zaire winning the African Cup of Nations in 1968 and in March 1974, just three months before their World Cup appearance. After qualifying for the 1974 FIFA World Cup in December 1973, the players were each given a car and a house by Mobutu.

The disastrous displays of the Zaire national team were put into a new light in a notable 2002 interview with defender Mwepu Ilunga. According to him, they were informed they would not be paid after their initial 0-2 defeat against Scotland. This led to the Zairian players refusing to play. Even though they were persuaded to show up against Yugoslavia, they were unmotivated and lost 0-9, one of the highest defeats in FIFA World Cup history.

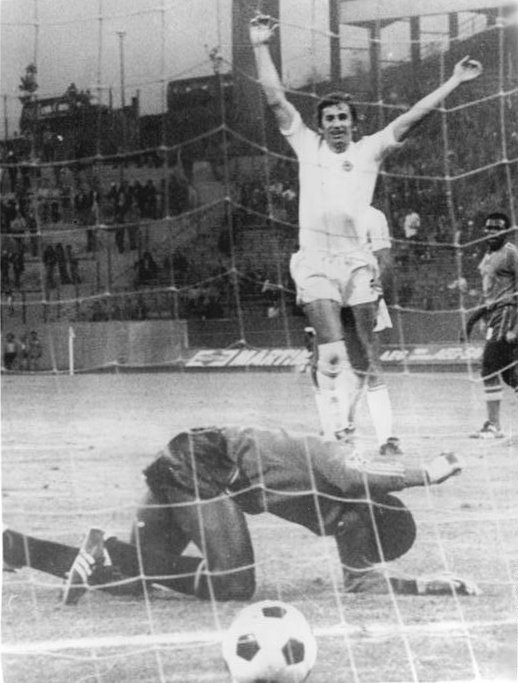
Tubilandu Ndimbi laments as Josip Katalinski scores Yugoslavia's fourth of nine goals against Zaire

"After the match, he (Mobutu) sent his presidential guards to threaten us. They closed the hotel to all journalists and said that if we lost 0-4 to Brazil, none of us would be able to return home", Ilunga is quoted.

They lost their final match 0–3.

In an interview in 2018, the captain Raoul Kidumu affirmed the reason for the defeat against Yugoslavia.

"We were aware that every team received a big qualification bonus [From FIFA, and partially passed on to the players] of half a million dollars. That was our money. We'd been asking for days. We shared the same hotel with the players of Haiti and every day we saw them arrive back with bags full of presents: jewellery, radios, clothes. Bought with their bonus. Meanwhile our Minister of Sport was running around with his bum bag. He was arranging the financial matters with FIFA. On the eve of the game with Yugoslavia he called us together for a meeting. We thought: "Finally!" Until he said he had to share something with us. "Regarding the money, it'll be sent straight to Zaire." That's when we knew we wouldn't see a penny of it. All the players were angry, including myself. We wouldn't play against Yugoslavia. A team at the world championships had never forfeited before. We were determined to be the first."

Of course this angered the dictator Mobutu and half an hour later a further team meeting was called. The president was on the line and Kidumu as the team captain had to pick up the phone. "The president was angry. A strike? He said he would be watching the match the next day on TV. He told me he would be watching whether or not we entered the pitch. It sounded like a threat so we gave in. We were afraid of the consequences. Not even for ourselves, but our families back in Zaire. So we showed up for the match. But you have to understand that our morale was gone."

The captain also affirmed the threats made by the president about losing the next match against Brazil by more than 3 goals. “We started the match with the intention to show the world we could play football. At half time it was only 1–0. But the coach deceived everyone. Together with the goal keeper he falsified the game. Kazadi, our goalkeeper, later confessed it. Brazil had to win by at least three goals to qualify and they arranged it. You should rewatch those last two goals. A blind wench could have stopped those balls."

== The Free Kick Incident ==
Late in their third match, a free kick was given to Zairian opponents Brazil at a central position just outside the penalty box. Before Brazil's free kick specialist Rivellino could take it, however, Zaire defender Mwepu Ilunga darted out of the defending wall and kicked the ball away as hard as he could. At the time, some thought of it as "a bizarre moment of African innocence" as quoted by BBC reporter John Motson. Ever since, it is regularly listed among the most hilarious and memorable moments of World Cup history.

Only decades later did Ilunga explain that he was fully aware of the rules and had hoped to be sent off in an act of protest, but referee Nicolae Rainea only showed him a yellow card.

== Aftermath ==
The Yugoslav coach Vidinić did not return to Zaire after the championships but went straight back to his home country.

The players, rather than being received by luxurious coach as had been the case after their Africa Cup triumph, had an empty army truck waiting for them. They were driven straight to the presidential palace, where Mobutu was waiting for them.

The captain said "There he gave us an ear full. He looked at us over the rim of his glasses, like an angry dad to his children: "So you thought you would rebel? I gave you all a house and a car!". He was furious. Not one player dared to speak. It was deathly quiet. In the end I softly asked to have the word and I apologised for what happened. It's the only thing I could have done. He finished with "Next time I'll throw you all in jail.""

As punishment none of the players could leave the country. A list in the port and the airport of their names was displayed with "Forbidden to leave the country". This scuppered the players prospects of moves to European clubs with the offers that came in after the World cup.

After the World Cup, Mobutu lost interest in football and stopped actively using the Zaire national team as a political tool for promoting his regime. One of the players ended up being homeless. In 2012 a charity raised money for the surviving players to receive a small pension every month of a couple of hundred dollars.

== Record at the FIFA World Cup ==
Year	Round	Position	Pld	W	D*	L	GF	GA
(Uruguay) 1930	Did not enter							
(Italy) 1934	Did not enter							
(France) 1938	Did not enter							
(Brazil) 1950	Did not enter							
(Switzerland) 1954	Did not enter							
(Sweden) 1958	Did not enter							
(Chile) 1962	Did not enter							
(England) 1966	Did not enter							
(Mexico) 1970	Did not enter							
as Zaire
(West Germany) 1974	Group stage	16th	3	0	0	3	0	14
(Argentina) 1978	Did not qualify							
(Spain) 1982	Did not qualify							
(Mexico) 1986	Did not enter							
(Italy) 1990	Did not qualify							
(United States) 1994	Did not qualify							
as DR Congo
(France) 1998	Did not qualify							
(South Korea) (Japan) 2002	Did not qualify							
(Germany) 2006	Did not qualify							
(South Africa) 2010	Did not qualify							
(Brazil) 2014	Did not qualify							
(Russia) 2018	Did not qualify							
(Qatar) 2022	Did not qualify							
(Canada) (Mexico) (United States) 2026	Round of 32	23rd	4	1	1	2	5	5
(Morocco) (Portugal) (Spain) 2030	To be determined							
(Saudi Arabia) 2034	To be determined							
Total	Round of 32	2/22	7	1	1	5	5	19

*Draws include knockout matches decided via penalty shoot-out

=== By Match ===
World Cup	Round	Opponent	Score	Result	Venue	Scorers
1974	Group stage	Scotland	0–2	L	Dortmund	—
1974	Group stage	Yugoslavia	0–9	L	Gelsenkirchen	—
1974	Group stage	Brazil	0–3	L	Gelsenkirchen	—
2026	Group stage	Portugal	1–1	D	Houston	Wissa
2026	Group stage	Colombia	0–1	L	Zapopan	—
2026	Group stage	Uzbekistan	3–1	W	Atlanta	Wissa (2), Mayele
2026	Round of 32	England	1–2	L	Atlanta	Cipenga

=== Record by Opponent ===
FIFA World Cup matches (by team)
Opponent	Wins	Draws	Losses	Total	Goals Scored	Goals Conceded
Brazil	0	0	1	1	0	3
Colombia	0	0	1	1	0	1
England	0	0	1	1	1	2
Portugal	0	1	0	1	1	1
Scotland	0	0	1	1	0	2
Uzbekistan	1	0	0	1	3	1
Yugoslavia	0	0	1	1	0	9

== Zaire at West Germany 1974 ==
=== Squad ===
Zaire Head coach: (Socialist Federal Republic of Yugoslavia) Blagoje Vidinić

No.	Pos.	Player	Date of birth (age)	Caps	Club
1	GK	Mwamba Kazadi	6 March 1947 (aged 27)		(Zaire) TP Mazembe
2	DF	Mwepu Ilunga	22 August 1949 (aged 24)		(Zaire) TP Mazembe
3	DF	Mwanza Mukombo	17 December 1945 (aged 28)		(Zaire) TP Mazembe
4	DF	Tshimen Bwanga	4 January 1949 (aged 25)		(Zaire) TP Mazembe
5	DF	Boba Lobilo	10 April 1950 (aged 24)		(Zaire) AS Vita Club
6	MF	Massamba Kilasu	22 December 1950 (aged 23)		(Zaire) AS Bilima
7	MF	Kamunda Tshinabu	8 May 1946 (aged 28)		(Zaire) TP Mazembe
8	MF	Mambwene Mana	10 October 1947 (aged 26)		(Zaire) CS Imana
9	MF	Uba Kembo Kembo	27 December 1947 (aged 26)		(Zaire) AS Vita Club
10	MF	Mantantu Kidumu	17 November 1946 (aged 27)		(Zaire) CS Imana
11	DF	Babo Kabasu	4 March 1950 (aged 24)		(Zaire) AS Bilima
12	GK	Dimbi Tubilandu	15 March 1948 (aged 26)		(Zaire) AS Vita Club
13	MF	Mulamba Ndaye	4 November 1948 (aged 25)		(Zaire) AS Vita Club
14	FW	Adelard Mayanga Maku	31 October 1948 (aged 25)		(Zaire) AS Vita Club
15	MF	Mafu Kibonge	12 February 1945 (aged 29)		(Zaire) AS Vita Club
16	DF	Mialo Mwape	30 December 1951 (aged 22)		(Zaire) Nyiki Lubumbashi
17	MF	Kafula Ngoie	11 November 1945 (aged 28)		(Zaire) TP Mazembe
18	FW	Mafuila Mavuba	15 December 1949 (aged 24)		(Zaire) AS Vita Club
19	FW	Ekofa Mbungu	24 November 1948 (aged 25)		(Zaire) CS Imana
20	FW	Kalala Ntumba	7 January 1949 (aged 25)		(Zaire) AS Vita Club
21	FW	Etepe Kakoko	22 November 1950 (aged 23)		(Zaire) CS Imana
22	GK	Otepa Kalambay	12 November 1948 (aged 25)		(Zaire) TP Mazembe

=== Group 2 ===
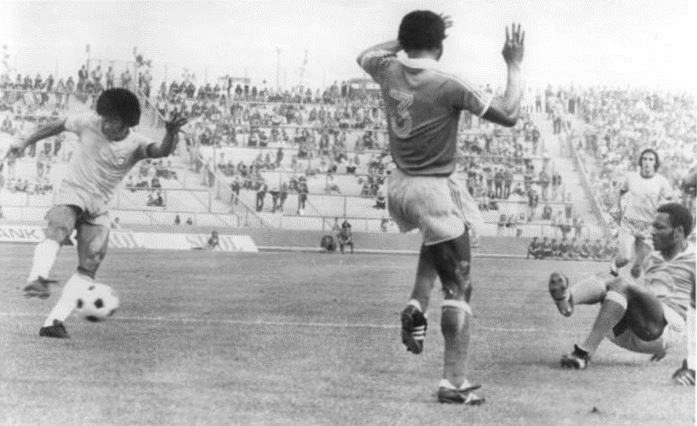
Zaire's final matchday against Brazil

Team	Pld	W	D	L	GF	GA	GD	Pts
Yugoslavia	3	1	2	0	10	1	+9	4
Brazil	3	1	2	0	3	0	+3	4
Scotland	3	1	2	0	3	1	+2	4
Zaire	3	0	0	3	0	14	−14	0

- Yugoslavia finished above Brazil, who in turn finished above Scotland, on goal difference
14 June 1974
19:30 CET

Zaire	0 – 2	Scotland
	Report	Lorimer 26'; Jordan 34'

Westfalenstadion, Dortmund
Attendance: 25,000
Referee: Gerhard Schulenburg (West Germany)

18 June 1974
19:30 CET

Yugoslavia	9 – 0	Zaire
Bajević 8', 30', 81'; Džajić 14'; Šurjak 18'; Katalinski 22'; Bogićević 35'; Oblak 61'; Petković 65'	Report

Parkstadion, Gelsenkirchen
Attendance: 20,000
Referee: Omar Delgado Gómez (Colombia)

22 June 1974
16:00 CET

Zaire	0 – 3	Brazil
	Report	Jairzinho 12'; Rivellino 66'; Valdomiro 79'

Parkstadion, Gelsenkirchen
Attendance: 35,000
Referee: Nicolae Rainea (Romania)

== DR Congo at 2026 ==
=== Group stage ===
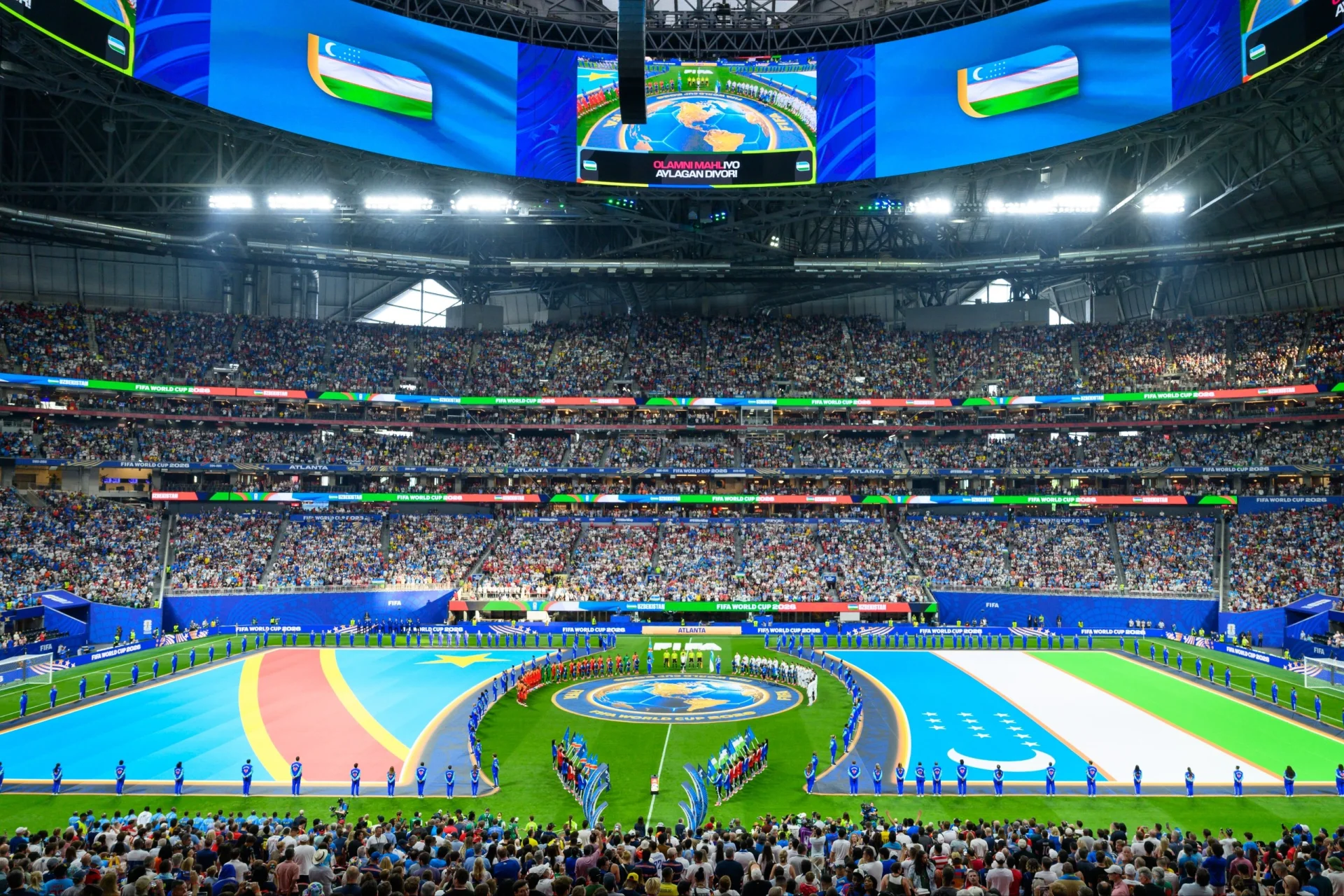
DR Congo vs Uzbekistan

Pos	Team	Pld	W	D	L	GF	GA	GD	Pts	Qualification
1	Colombia	3	2	1	0	4	1	+3	7	Advance to knockout stage
2	Portugal	3	1	2	0	6	1	+5	5	Advance to knockout stage
3	DR Congo	3	1	1	1	4	3	+1	4	Advance to knockout stage
4	Uzbekistan	3	0	0	3	2	11	−9	0	

Source: FIFA
Rules for classification: Group stage tiebreakers
June 17, 2026
12:00 p.m. UTC−5

Portugal	1–1	DR Congo
J. Neves 6'	(Note: "Portugal vs Congo DR | First Stage | FIFA World Cup 2026". FIFA. Retrieved June 17, 2026.; "Match Report – Group K – Portugal v. Congo DR". FIFA. June 17, 2026. Retrieved June 17, 2026.; "Post match summary report – Group K – Portugal v. Congo DR". FIFA. June 17, 2026. Retrieved June 19, 2026.)	Wissa 45+5'

NRG Stadium, Houston
Attendance: 68,777
Referee: Abdulrahman Al-Jassim (Qatar)

June 23, 2026
8:00 p.m. UTC−6

Colombia	1–0	DR Congo
Muñoz 76'	(Note: "Colombia vs Congo DR | First Stage | FIFA World Cup 2026". FIFA. Retrieved June 24, 2026.; "Match Report – Group K – Colombia v. Congo DR". FIFA. June 24, 2026. Retrieved June 24, 2026.; "Post match summary report – Group K – Colombia v. Congo DR". FIFA. June 24, 2026. Retrieved June 25, 2026.)

Estadio Akron, Zapopan
Attendance: 45,358
Referee: Maurizio Mariani (Italy)

June 27, 2026
7:30 p.m. UTC−4

DR Congo	3–1	Uzbekistan
Wissa 68' (pen.), 90+1'; Mayele 78'	(Note: "Congo DR vs Uzbekistan | First Stage | FIFA World Cup 2026". FIFA. Retrieved June 28, 2026.; "Match Report – Group K – Congo DR v. Uzbekistan". FIFA. June 28, 2026. Retrieved June 28, 2026.; "Post match summary report – Group K – Congo DR v. Uzbekistan". FIFA. June 28, 2026. Retrieved June 28, 2026.)	Shomurodov 10'

Mercedes-Benz Stadium, Atlanta
Attendance: 68,239
Referee: Felix Zwayer (Germany)

=== Knockout stage ===
Round of 32

July 1, 2026
12:00 p.m. UTC−4

England	2–1	DR Congo
Kane 75', 86'	(Note: "England vs Congo DR | Round of 32 | FIFA World Cup 2026". FIFA. Retrieved July 1, 2026.; "Match Report – Round of 32 – England v. Congo DR". FIFA. July 1, 2026. Retrieved July 1, 2026.; "Post match summary report – Round of 32 – England v. Congo DR". FIFA. July 1, 2026. Retrieved July 3, 2026.)	Cipenga 7'

Mercedes-Benz Stadium, Atlanta
Attendance: 68,239
Referee: Adham Makhadmeh (Jordan)

== Player records ==
=== Most appearances ===
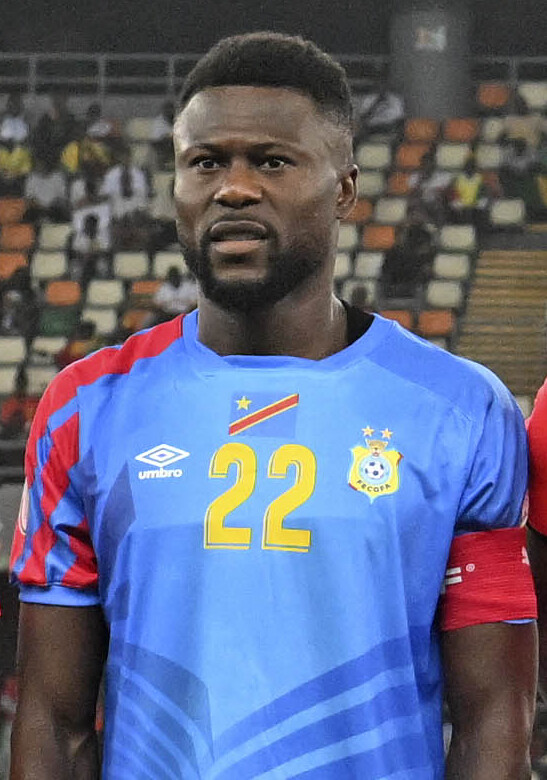
Chancel Mbemba captained DR Congo at the 2026 FIFA World Cup

Nine players were fielded by head coach Sébastien Desabre in all four of DR Congo's matches at the 2026 FIFA World Cup, making them record players for their country.

Rank	Player	Matches	World Cups
1	Arthur Masuaku	4	2026
1	Chancel Mbemba	4	2026
1	Samuel Moutoussamy	4	2026
1	Lionel Mpasi	4	2026
1	Ngal'ayel Mukau	4	2026
1	Noah Sadiki	4	2026
1	Axel Tuanzebe	4	2026
1	Aaron Wan-Bissaka	4	2026
1	Yoane Wissa	4	2026
10	Fourteen players	3	1974 (10 players), 2026 (4 players)

=== Goalscorers ===
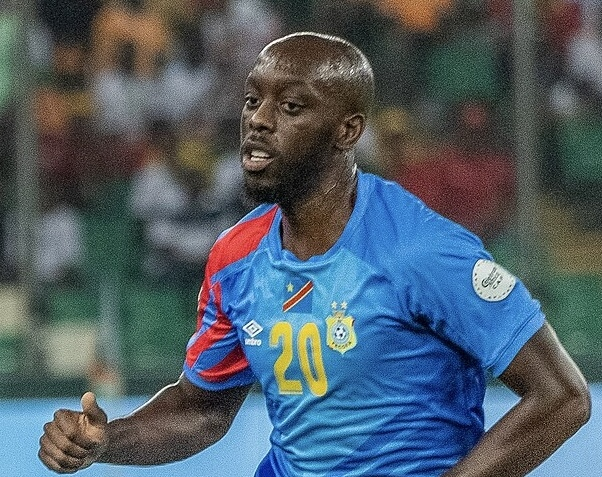
DR Congo's top World Cup scorer Yoane Wissa

On 17 June 2026, Yoane Wissa scored DR Congo's first-ever FIFA World Cup goal, doing so in their opening match against Portugal in Houston.

Player	Goals	1974	2026
Yoane Wissa	3		3
Fiston Mayele	1		1
Brian Cipenga	1		1
Total	5	0	5

== See also ==
- African nations at the FIFA World Cup
- DR Congo at the Africa Cup of Nations
