= 1974 FIFA World Cup Group 2 =

Football tournament group stage

Group 2 of the 1974 FIFA World Cup was contested between 13 and 22 June 1974, with matches played in three cities: Dortmund, Gelsenkirchen and Frankfurt.

The group consisted of defending champions Brazil, Scotland, Yugoslavia and African Cup of Nations winner Zaire.

== Standings ==
| Pos | Team | Pld | W | D | L | GF | GA | GD | Pts | Qualification |
|---|---|---|---|---|---|---|---|---|---|---|
| 1 | Yugoslavia | 3 | 1 | 2 | 0 | 10 | 1 | +9 | 4 | Advance to second round |
| 2 | Brazil | 3 | 1 | 2 | 0 | 3 | 0 | +3 | 4 | Advance to second round |
| 3 | Scotland | 3 | 1 | 2 | 0 | 3 | 1 | +2 | 4 | |
| 4 | Zaire | 3 | 0 | 0 | 3 | 0 | 14 | −14 | 0 | |

Source: FIFA

== Matches ==
All times listed are local (CET)

=== Brazil vs Yugoslavia ===
13 June 1974
17:00 CET

| Brazil | 0–0 | Yugoslavia |

Waldstadion, Frankfurt
Attendance: 62,000
Referee: Rudolf Scheurer (Switzerland)

| Brazil | Yugoslavia |

| GK | 1 | Émerson Leão |
| RB | 14 | Nelinho |
| CB | 2 | Luís Pereira |
| CB | 3 | Marinho Peres |
| LB | 6 | Marinho Chagas |
| CM | 5 | Piazza (c) |
| CM | 10 | Rivellino |
| AM | 8 | Leivinha |
| RW | 13 | Valdomiro |
| LW | 11 | Caju |
| CF | 7 | Jairzinho |
Manager:
Mário Zagallo

| GK | 1 | Enver Marić |
| SW | 2 | Ivan Buljan |
| RB | 4 | Dražen Mužinić |
| CB | 5 | Josip Katalinski |
| LB | 3 | Enver Hadžiabdić |
| CM | 8 | Branko Oblak | (yellow card) 17' |
| CM | 10 | Jovan Aćimović | (yellow card) 49' |
| CM | 6 | Vladislav Bogićević |
| RW | 7 | Ilija Petković |
| LW | 11 | Dragan Džajić (c) |
| CF | 9 | Ivica Šurjak |
Manager:
Miljan Miljanić

Linesmen:
Vital Loraux (Belgium)
Luis Pestarino (Argentina)

=== Zaire vs Scotland ===
14 June 1974
19:30 CET

| Zaire | 0–2 | Scotland |
|---|---|---|
| | | Lorimer 26'; Jordan 34' |

Westfalenstadion, Dortmund
Attendance: 27,000
Referee: Gerhard Schulenburg (West Germany)

| Zaire | Scotland |

| GK | 1 | Kazadi Mwamba |
| RB | 2 | Mwepu Ilunga |
| CB | 5 | Lobilo Boba |
| CB | 4 | Bwanga Tshimen |
| LB | 3 | Mwanza Mukombo |
| CM | 6 | Kilasu Massamba |
| CM | 8 | Mana Mamuwene |
| AM | 10 | Kidumu Mantantu (c) | (yellow card) 40' | (substituted off) 78' |
| RF | 14 | Mayanga Maku | | (substituted off) 64' |
| CF | 13 | Ndaye Mulamba |
| LF | 21 | Kakoko Etepé |
Substitutions:
| MF | 9 | Kembo Uba Kembo | | (substituted on) 64' |
| MF | 15 | Kibonge Mafu | | (substituted on) 78' |
Manager:
(Socialist Federal Republic of Yugoslavia) Blagoje Vidinić

| GK | 1 | David Harvey |
| RB | 2 | Sandy Jardine |
| CB | 5 | Jim Holton | (yellow card) 48' |
| CB | 6 | John Blackley |
| LB | 3 | Danny McGrain |
| CM | 8 | Kenny Dalglish | | (substituted off) 75' |
| CM | 4 | Billy Bremner (c) |
| CM | 10 | David Hay |
| RW | 11 | Peter Lorimer |
| CF | 19 | Denis Law |
| CF | 9 | Joe Jordan |
Substitutions:
| CM | 18 | Tommy Hutchison | | (substituted on) 75' |
Manager:
Willie Ormond

Linesmen:
Tony Boskovic (Australia)
Hans-Joachim Weyland (Germany)

=== Yugoslavia vs Zaire ===
18 June 1974
19:30 CET

| Yugoslavia | 9–0 | Zaire |
|---|---|---|
| Bajević 8', 30', 81'; Džajić 14'; Šurjak 18'; Katalinski 22'; Bogićević 35'; Oblak 61'; Petković 65' |

Parkstadion, Gelsenkirchen
Attendance: 31,700
Referee: Omar Delgado Gómez (Colombia)

| Yugoslavia | Zaire |

| GK | 1 | Enver Marić |
| SW | 6 | Vladislav Bogićević |
| RB | 2 | Ivan Buljan |
| CB | 5 | Josip Katalinski |
| LB | 3 | Enver Hadžiabdić | (yellow card) 54' |
| CM | 8 | Branko Oblak |
| CM | 10 | Jovan Aćimović |
| AM | 9 | Ivica Šurjak |
| RW | 7 | Ilija Petković |
| LW | 11 | Dragan Džajić (c) |
| CF | 19 | Dušan Bajević |
Manager:
Miljan Miljanić

| GK | 1 | Kazadi Mwamba | | (substituted off) 21' |
| RB | 2 | Mwepu Ilunga |
| CB | 5 | Lobilo Boba |
| CB | 4 | Bwanga Tshimen |
| LB | 3 | Mwanza Mukombo |
| MF | 6 | Kilasu Massamba |
| MF | 8 | Mana Mamuwene |
| MF | 10 | Kidumu Mantantu (c) |
| RF | 13 | Ndaye Mulamba | (red card) 22' |
| CF | 9 | Kembo Uba Kembo |
| LF | 21 | Kakoko Etepé | | (substituted off) 45' |
Substitutions:
| GK | 12 | Tubilandu Ndimbi | | (substituted on) 21' |
| FW | 14 | Mayanga Maku | | (substituted on) 45' |
Manager:
(Socialist Federal Republic of Yugoslavia) Blagoje Vidinić

Assistant referees:
Vincente Llobregat (Venezuela)
Ramón Barreto (Uruguay)

=== Scotland vs Brazil ===
18 June 1974
19:30 CET

| Scotland | 0–0 | Brazil |

Waldstadion, Frankfurt
Attendance: 62,000
Referee: Arie van Gemert (Netherlands)

| Scotland | Brazil |

| GK | 1 | David Harvey |
| RB | 2 | Sandy Jardine |
| CB | 5 | Jim Holton |
| CB | 14 | Martin Buchan |
| LB | 3 | Danny McGrain |
| CM | 8 | Kenny Dalglish |
| CM | 4 | Billy Bremner (c) |
| CM | 10 | David Hay |
| RW | 20 | Willie Morgan |
| SS | 11 | Peter Lorimer |
| CF | 9 | Joe Jordan |
Manager:
Willie Ormond

| GK | 1 | Émerson Leão |
| RB | 14 | Nelinho |
| CB | 2 | Luís Pereira |
| CB | 3 | Marinho Peres | (yellow card) 87' |
| LB | 6 | Marinho Chagas | (yellow card) 81' |
| CM | 5 | Piazza (c) |
| CM | 10 | Rivellino | (yellow card) 35' |
| AM | 8 | Leivinha | | (substituted off) 65' |
| RW | 7 | Jairzinho |
| LW | 11 | Caju |
| CF | 19 | Mirandinha |
Substitutions:
| AM | 17 | Carpegiani | | (substituted on) 65' |
Manager:
Mário Zagallo

Linesmen:
Károly Palotai (Hungary)
Erich Linemayr (Austria)

=== Scotland vs Yugoslavia ===
22 June 1974
16:00 CET

| Scotland | 1–1 | Yugoslavia |
|---|---|---|
| Jordan 88' | | Karasi 81' |

Waldstadion, Frankfurt
Attendance: 56,000
Referee: Alfonso González Archundía (Mexico)

| Scotland | Yugoslavia |

| GK | 1 | David Harvey |
| RB | 2 | Sandy Jardine |
| CB | 5 | Jim Holton |
| CB | 14 | Martin Buchan |
| LB | 3 | Danny McGrain |
| CM | 8 | Kenny Dalglish | | (substituted off) 65' |
| CM | 4 | Billy Bremner (c) |
| CM | 10 | David Hay | (yellow card) 70' |
| RW | 20 | Willie Morgan |
| SS | 11 | Peter Lorimer |
| CF | 9 | Joe Jordan | (yellow card) 60' |
Substitutions:
| CM | 18 | Tommy Hutchison | | (substituted on) 65' |
Manager:
Willie Ormond

| GK | 1 | Enver Marić |
| SW | 6 | Vladislav Bogićević |
| RB | 2 | Ivan Buljan |
| CB | 5 | Josip Katalinski | (yellow card) 55' |
| LB | 3 | Enver Hadžiabdić |
| CM | 8 | Branko Oblak | (yellow card) 21' |
| CM | 10 | Jovan Aćimović |
| AM | 9 | Ivica Šurjak |
| RW | 7 | Ilija Petković |
| LW | 11 | Dragan Džajić (c) |
| CF | 19 | Dušan Bajević | (yellow card) 70' | (substituted off) 70' |
Substitutions:
| AM | 18 | Stanislav Karasi | | (substituted on) 70' |
Manager:
Miljan Miljanić

Linesmen:
Kurt Tschenscher (West Germany)
Rudi Glöckner (East Germany)

=== Zaire vs Brazil ===
22 June 1974
16:00 CET

| Zaire | 0–3 | Brazil |
|---|---|---|
| | | Jairzinho 12'; Rivellino 66'; Valdomiro 79' |

Parkstadion, Gelsenkirchen
Attendance: 36,200
Referee: Nicolae Rainea (Romania)

| Zaire | Brazil |

| GK | 1 | Kazadi Mwamba |
| DF | 2 | Mwepu Ilunga | (yellow card) 78' |
| DF | 3 | Mwanza Mukombo |
| DF | 4 | Bwanga Tshimen |
| DF | 5 | Lobilo Boba |
| MF | 7 | Tshinabu Wa Munda | | (substituted off) 81' |
| MF | 8 | Mana Mamuwene |
| MF | 10 | Kidumu Mantantu (c) | | (substituted off) 62' |
| MF | 15 | Kibonge Mafu |
| FW | 14 | Mayanga Maku |
| FW | 20 | Jean Kalala N'Tumba |
Substitutions:
| MF | 6 | Kilasu Massamba | | (substituted on) 62' |
| MF | 9 | Kembo Uba Kembo | | (substituted on) 81' |
Manager:
(Socialist Federal Republic of Yugoslavia) Blagoje Vidinić

| GK | 1 | Leão |
| RB | 14 | Nelinho |
| CB | 2 | Luís Pereira |
| CB | 3 | Marinho Peres |
| LB | 6 | Marinho Chagas |
| CM | 5 | Piazza (c) | | (substituted off) 61' |
| CM | 10 | Rivellino |
| AM | 17 | Carpegiani |
| RW | 7 | Jairzinho |
| LW | 20 | Edu |
| CF | 8 | Leivinha | | (substituted off) 12' |
Substitutions:
| RW | 13 | Valdomiro | | (substituted on) 12' |
| CF | 19 | Mirandinha | (yellow card) 77' | (substituted on) 61' |
Manager:
Mário Zagallo

Linesmen:
Aurelio Angonese (Italy)
Klaus Ohmsen (West Germany)

== See also ==
- Brazil at the FIFA World Cup
- DR Congo at the FIFA World Cup
- Scotland at the FIFA World Cup
- Yugoslavia at the FIFA World Cup
