= 1974 African Cup of Nations final =

Football match held in Egypt

- Event: 1974 African Cup of Nations
Zaire	Zambia
(Zaire)	(Zambia)
- Zaire won after a replay

Final
Zaire	Zambia
2	2
- After extra time
- Date: 12 March 1974
- Venue: Nasser Stadium, Cairo
- Referee: Gamar Gamar (Libya)
- Attendance: 55,000

Replay
Zaire	Zambia
2	0
- Date: 14 March 1974
- Venue: Nasser Stadium, Cairo
- Referee: Gamar Gamar (Libya)
- Attendance: 1,000

The 1974 African Cup of Nations final was an association football match between Zaire and Zambia at the Nasser Stadium in Cairo to determine the winner of the 1974 African Cup of Nations, the ninth edition of the African Cup of Nations. The final was drawn 2–2 on 12 March 1974, before Zaire won the replay 2–0 two days later. It was the first African Cup of Nations final that failed to produce a winner after both normal time and extra time.

== Details ==
=== Final ===
12 March 1974
--:-- UTC+2

Zaire	2–2 (a.e.t.)	Zambia
Mulamba 65', 117'	Report	Kaushi 40'; Sinyangwe 120'

Cairo International Stadium, Cairo
Attendance: 55,000
Referee: Saad Gamar (Libya)

Zaire	Zambia

GK	1	Mwamba Kazadi
DF	4	Bwanga Tshimen
DF	5	Lobilo Boba
DF	2	Mwepu Ilunga
DF	3	Mwanza Mukombo
MF	14	Mayanga Maku
MF	6	Mavuba Mafuila
MF	10	Kidumu Mantantu
MF	8	Mana Mamuwene
FW	13	Ndaye Mulamba
FW	11	Kakoko Etepé
Substitutions:
Manager:
(Socialist Federal Republic of Yugoslavia) Blagoje Vidinić

GK	Emmanuel Mwape
DF	Dick Chama
DF	Dickson Makwaza
DF	Edwin Mbaso
DF	Ackim Musenge
MF	Bernard Chanda
MF	Jan Simulambo
MF	Boniface Simutowe
FW	Simon Kaushi
FW	Joseph Mapulanga
FW	Brighton Sinyangwe
Substitutions:
Manager:
(Socialist Federal Republic of Yugoslavia) Ante Bušelić

Assistant referees:
...
...

=== Replay ===
14 March 1974
--:-- UTC+2

Zaire	2–0	Zambia
Mulamba 30', 76'	Report

Cairo International Stadium, Cairo
Attendance: 1,000
Referee: Saad Gamar (Libya)

Zaire	Zambia

GK	1	Mwamba Kazadi
DF	4	Bwanga Tshimen
DF	5	Lobilo Boba
DF	2	Mwepu Ilunga
DF	3	Mwanza Mukombo
MF	14	Mayanga Maku
MF	6	Mavuba Mafuila
MF	10	Kidumu Mantantu
MF	8	Mana Mamuwene
FW	13	Ndaye Mulamba
FW	11	Kakoko Etepé
Substitutions:
Manager:
(Socialist Federal Republic of Yugoslavia) Blagoje Vidinić

GK	Emmanuel Mwape
DF	Dick Chama
DF	Dickson Makwaza
DF	Edwin Mbaso
DF	Ackim Musenge
MF	Bernard Chanda
MF	Jan Simulambo
MF	Boniface Simutowe
FW	Simon Kaushi
FW	Joseph Mapulanga
FW	Brighton Sinyangwe
Substitutions:
Manager:
(Socialist Federal Republic of Yugoslavia) Ante Bušelić

Assistant referees:
...
...
