= DR Congo at the Africa Cup of Nations =

DR Congo is one of the major participants at the Africa Cup of Nations, having appeared at twenty editions of all AFCON tournaments. They are also one of the most successful teams in Africa, having won the title twice, once in 1968 as Congo-Kinshasa, and again in 1974 as Zaire. However, since then, successes have been elusively fading for the national side of DR Congo, in spite of their frequent participation in the tournament aftermath. Their best result since 1974 was third place in 1998 and 2015.

== Overall record ==
Africa Cup of Nations record
Titles: 2 Appearances: 21
Year	Position	Year	Position	Year	Position	Year	Position
(Sudan) 1957	Did not enter	(Ethiopia) 1976	Round 1	(Tunisia) 1994	Quarter-finals	(Equatorial Guinea) (Gabon) 2012	Did not qualify
(Egypt) 1959	Did not enter	(Ghana) 1978	Did not enter	(South Africa) 1996	Quarter-finals	(South Africa) 2013	Round 1
(Ethiopia) 1962	Did not enter	(Nigeria) 1980	Did not qualify	(Burkina Faso) 1998	Third place	(Equatorial Guinea) 2015	Third place
(Ghana) 1963	Did not enter	(Libya) 1982	Did not qualify	(Ghana) (Nigeria) 2000	Round 1	(Gabon) 2017	Quarter-finals
(Tunisia) 1965	Round 1	(Ivory Coast) 1984	Withdrew	(Mali) 2002	Quarter-finals	(Egypt) 2019	Round of 16
(Ethiopia) 1968	Champions	(Egypt) 1986	Did not qualify	(Tunisia) 2004	Round 1	(Cameroon) 2021	Did not qualify
(Sudan) 1970	Round 1	(Morocco) 1988	Round 1	(Egypt) 2006	Quarter-finals	(Ivory Coast) 2023	Fourth place
(Cameroon) 1972	Fourth place	(Algeria) 1990	Did not qualify	(Ghana) 2008	Did not qualify	(Morocco) 2025	Qualified
(Egypt) 1974	Champions	(Senegal) 1992	Quarter-finals	(Angola) 2010	Did not qualify	(Kenya) (Tanzania) (Uganda) 2027	To be determined

== Matches ==
By match
Tournament	Opponent	Score	Result	DR Congo scorers
(Tunisia) 1965	Ghana	2–5	L	Pierre Kalala 43', 45' (pen.)
(Tunisia) 1965	Ivory Coast	0–3	L	
(Ethiopia) 1968	Congo-Brazzaville	3–0	W	Ignace Muwawa 19'; Nicodème Kabamba 27' (pen.), 51'
(Ethiopia) 1968	Ghana	1–2	L	Saio Ernest Mokili 42'
(Ethiopia) 1968	Senegal	2–1	W	Kidumu Mantantu (-); Elias Tshimanga (-)
(Ethiopia) 1968	Ethiopia	3–2 (a.e.t.)	W	Kidumu Mantantu 3'; Léon Mungamuni 16', 100'
(Ethiopia) 1968	Ghana	1–0	W	Pierre Kalala 66'
(Sudan) 1970	Ghana	0–2	L	
(Sudan) 1970	Guinea	2–2	D	André Kalonzo 70'; Léon Mungamuni 72'
(Sudan) 1970	United Arab Republic	0–1	L	
(Cameroon) 1972	Sudan	1–1	D	Mayanga Maku 53'
(Cameroon) 1972	Congo	2–0	W	Jean Kalala N'Tumba 16', 59'
(Cameroon) 1972	Morocco	1–1	D	Mayanga Maku 3'
(Cameroon) 1972	Mali	3–4 (a.e.t.)	L	Jean Kalala N'Tumba 6'; Kakoko Etepé 61'; Gary Ngassebe 78'
(Cameroon) 1972	Cameroon	2–5	L	Kakoko Etepé 13'; Mayanga Maku 17'
(Egypt) 1974	Guinea	2–1	W	Ndaye Mulamba 18', 65'
(Egypt) 1974	Congo	1–2	L	Mayanga Maku 25'
(Egypt) 1974	Mauritius	4–1	W	Ndaye Mulamba 15'; Mayanga Maku 19', 76'; Kakoko Etepé 38'
(Egypt) 1974	Egypt	3–2	W	Ndaye Mulamba 55', 72'; Kidumu Mantantu 61'
(Egypt) 1974	Zambia	2–2 (a.e.t.)	D	Ndaye Mulamba 65', 117'
(Egypt) 1974	Zambia	2–0	W	Ndaye Mulamba 30', 76'
(Ethiopia) 1976	Nigeria	2–4	L	Kabasu Babo 51'; Mbungu Ekofa 58'
(Ethiopia) 1976	Morocco	0–1	L	
(Ethiopia) 1976	Sudan	1–1	D	Ndaye Mulamba 41'
(Morocco) 1988	Morocco	1–1	D	Vita Lutonadio 88'
(Morocco) 1988	Ivory Coast	1–1	D	Eugène Kabongo 37'
(Morocco) 1988	Algeria	0–1	L	
(Senegal) 1992	Morocco	1–1	D	Andre Kona N'Gole 89'
(Senegal) 1992	Cameroon	1–1	D	Tueba Menayame 1'
(Senegal) 1992	Nigeria	0–1	L	
(Tunisia) 1994	Mali	1–0	W	Basaula Lemba 48'
(Tunisia) 1994	Tunisia	1–1	D	Nsumba Ngoy 55'
(Tunisia) 1994	Nigeria	0–2	L	
(South Africa) 1996	Gabon	0–2	L	
(South Africa) 1996	Liberia	2–0	W	Roger Lukaku 5' (pen.); Liombi Essende 72'
(South Africa) 1996	Ghana	0–1	L	
(Burkina Faso) 1998	Togo	2–1	W	Jerry Tondelua 57' (pen.), 73' (pen.)
(Burkina Faso) 1998	Tunisia	1–2	L	Papi Kimoto 36'
(Burkina Faso) 1998	Ghana	1–0	W	Mundaba Kisombe 77'
(Burkina Faso) 1998	Cameroon	1–0	W	Jerry Tondelua 30'
(Burkina Faso) 1998	South Africa	1–2 (a.e.t.)	L	Eddy Bembuana-Keve 48'
(Burkina Faso) 1998	Burkina Faso	4–4 (4–1 p)	D	Lokenge Mungongo 76', 90'; Jean-Kasongo Banza 88'; Jerry Tondelua 89'
(Ghana) (Nigeria) 2000	Algeria	0–0	D	
(Ghana) (Nigeria) 2000	South Africa	0–1	L	
(Ghana) (Nigeria) 2000	Gabon	0–0	D	
(Mali) 2002	Cameroon	0–1	L	
(Mali) 2002	Togo	0–0	D	
(Mali) 2002	Ivory Coast	3–1	W	Yves Yuvuladio 28'; Shabani Nonda 66'; Papi Kimoto 81' (pen.)
(Mali) 2002	Senegal	0–2	L	
(Tunisia) 2004	Guinea	1–2	L	Alain Masudi 35'
(Tunisia) 2004	Tunisia	0–3	L	
(Tunisia) 2004	Rwanda	0–1	L	
(Egypt) 2006	Togo	2–0	W	Trésor Mputu 45'; Lomana LuaLua 64'
(Egypt) 2006	Angola	0–0	D	
(Egypt) 2006	Cameroon	0–2	L	
(Egypt) 2006	Egypt	1–4	L	Abdel-Zaher El-Saqqa 45+2' (o.g.)
(South Africa) 2013	Ghana	2–2	D	Trésor Mputu 53'; Dieumerci Mbokani 69' (pen.)
(South Africa) 2013	Niger	0–0	D	
(South Africa) 2013	Mali	1–1	D	Dieumerci Mbokani 3' (pen.)
(Equatorial Guinea) 2015	Zambia	1–1	D	Yannick Bolasie 66'
(Equatorial Guinea) 2015	Cape Verde	0–0	D	
(Equatorial Guinea) 2015	Tunisia	1–1	D	Jeremy Bokila 66'
(Equatorial Guinea) 2015	Congo	4–2	W	Dieumerci Mbokani 65', 90+1'; Jeremy Bokila 75'; Joël Kimwaki 81'
(Equatorial Guinea) 2015	Ivory Coast	1–3	L	Dieumerci Mbokani 24' (pen.)
(Equatorial Guinea) 2015	Equatorial Guinea	0–0 (4–2 p)	D	
(Gabon) 2017	Morocco	1–0	W	Junior Kabananga 55'
(Gabon) 2017	Ivory Coast	2–2	D	Neeskens Kebano 10'; Junior Kabananga 28'
(Gabon) 2017	Togo	3–1	W	Junior Kabananga 29'; Ndombe Mubele 54'; Paul-José M'Poku 80'
(Gabon) 2017	Ghana	1–2	L	Paul-José M'Poku 68'
(Egypt) 2019	Uganda	0–2	L	
(Egypt) 2019	Egypt	0–2	L	
(Egypt) 2019	Zimbabwe	4–0	W	Jonathan Bolingi 4'; Cédric Bakambu 34', 65'; Britt Assombalonga 78'
(Egypt) 2019	Madagascar	2–2 (2–4 p)	D	Cédric Bakambu 21'; Chancel Mbemba 90'
(Ivory Coast) 2023	Zambia	1–1	D	Yoane Wissa 27'
(Ivory Coast) 2023	Morocco	1–1	D	Silas Katompa Mvumpa 76'
(Ivory Coast) 2023	Zimbabwe	0–0	D	
(Ivory Coast) 2023	Egypt	1–1 (8–7 p)	D	Meschak Elia 37'
(Ivory Coast) 2023	Guinea	3–1	W	Chancel Mbemba 27'; Yoane Wissa 65' (pen.); Arthur Masuaku 82'
(Ivory Coast) 2023	Ivory Coast	0–1	L	
(Ivory Coast) 2023	South Africa	0–0 (5–6 p)	D	

== See also ==
- DR Congo at the FIFA World Cup
