= Mauritius at the Africa Cup of Nations =

Iraqptc.wiki/org

Mauritius has only qualified for one Africa Cup of Nations, which was the 1974 edition held in Egypt. The team lost all three matches and went out in the group stage.

== Overall record ==
Africa Cup of Nations record
Year	Round	Position	Pld	W	D*	L	GF	GA
(Sudan) 1957	Did not enter							
(United Arab Republic) 1959	Did not enter							
(Ethiopia) 1962	Did not enter							
(Ghana) 1963	Did not enter							
(Tunisia) 1965	Did not enter							
(Ethiopia) 1968	Did not qualify							
(Sudan) 1970	Did not qualify							
(Cameroon) 1972	Did not qualify							
(Egypt) 1974	Group stage	8th	3	0	0	3	2	8
(Ethiopia) 1976	Did not qualify							
(Ethiopia) 1976	Did not qualify							
(Nigeria) 1980	Did not qualify							
(Libya) 1982	Did not qualify							
(Ivory Coast) 1984	Did not qualify							
(Egypt) 1986	Did not qualify							
(Morocco) 1988	Withdrew							
(Algeria) 1990	Did not qualify							
(Senegal) 1992	Did not qualify							
(Tunisia) 1994	Did not qualify							
(South Africa) 1996	Did not qualify							
(Burkina Faso) 1998	Did not qualify							
(Ghana) (Nigeria) 2000	Did not qualify							
(Mali) 2002	Did not qualify							
(Tunisia) 2004	Did not qualify							
(Egypt) 2006	Did not qualify							
(Ghana) 2008	Did not qualify							
(Angola) 2010	Did not qualify							
(Gabon) (Equatorial Guinea) 2012	Did not qualify							
(South Africa) 2013	Did not enter							
(Equatorial Guinea) 2015	Did not qualify							
(Gabon) 2017	Did not qualify							
(Egypt) 2019	Did not qualify							
(Cameroon) 2021	Did not qualify							
(Ivory Coast) 2023	Did not qualify							
(Morocco) 2025	Did not qualify							
(Kenya) (Tanzania) (Uganda) 2027	To be determined							
Total	Round 1	1/35	3	0	0	3	2	8

== Competitive performance and squads ==
=== Egypt 1974 ===
Group B

Team	Pld	W	D	L	GF	GA	GD	Pts
Congo	3	2	1	0	5	2	+3	5
Zaire	3	2	0	1	7	4	+3	4
Guinea	3	1	1	1	4	4	0	3
Mauritius	3	0	0	3	2	8	−6	0

3 March 1974

Congo	2–0	Mauritius
Moukila; Lakou

Alexandria Stadium, Alexandria
5 March 1974

Guinea	2–1	Mauritius
M. Sylla 52', 64'		Imbert 88'

Ala'ab Damanhour Stadium, Damanhour
Referee: Ahmed Gindil (Sudan)
7 March 1974

Zaire	4–1	Mauritius
Mulamba 15'; Mayanga 19', 76'; Etepé 38'		Imbert 61'

Ala'ab Damanhour Stadium, Damanhour
Referee: Wallace Johnson (Sierra Leone)
