= 1974 African Cup of Nations qualification =

Football tournament

This page details the process of qualifying for the 1974 African Cup of Nations which was held in Egypt in March 1974. Eight teams qualified for the finals, including Egypt as hosts and Congo as the holders of the title, having won the 1972 tournament in Cameroon.

Qualification followed a knock-out model, with teams playing two-legged ties with another, one match being played at a home venue for each team. After a preliminary round, 24 teams competed in the first round of qualification. The winners went on to the second round with the winning teams from those ties qualifying for the finals. Matches were held between March and July 1973. A number of teams withdrew at the preliminary or first round stages of the tournament with their scheduled opponents automatically progressing to the next round. After winning their first round match the Central African Republic were disqualified and their opponents, Ivory Coast progressed to the second round, eventually reaching the finals.

Alongside Ivory Coast, Guinea, Mauritius, Uganda, Zaire and Zambia reached the finals, Uganda having taken part in the preliminary round of the qualification process.

== Qualifying tournament ==
=== Preliminary round ===
Team 1	Agg.	Team 2	1st leg	2nd leg
Somalia	2–5	Uganda	2–0	0–5
Central African Republic	w/o	Gabon	—	—
Sierra Leone	w/o	Dahomey	—	—

10 March 1973

Somalia	2–0	Uganda

Mogadishu Stadium, Mogadishu
24 March 1973

Uganda	5–0	Somalia

Nakivubo Stadium, Kampala

Uganda won 5–2 on aggregate.

Central African Republic	Cancelled	Gabon
		Withdrew

Central African Republic progress, Gabon withdrew.

Sierra Leone	Cancelled	Dahomey
		Withdrew

Sierra Leone progress, Dahomey withdrew.

=== First round ===
Team 1	Agg.	Team 2	1st leg	2nd leg
Sierra Leone	3–5	Mali	1–1	2–4
Ghana	3–3 (5–3 p)	Senegal	3–2	0–1
Central African Republic	5–7	Ivory Coast	4–2	1–5
Ethiopia	2–4	Tanzania	2–1	0–3
Lesotho	1–5	Mauritius	0–0	1–5
Sudan	2–3	Nigeria	1–1	1–2
Upper Volta	1–9	Zaire	0–5	1–4
Uganda	3–1	Kenya	1–0	2–1
Zambia	4–3	Madagascar	3–1	1–2
Algeria	w/o	Libya	—	—
Cameroon	w/o	Niger	—	—
Guinea	w/o	Togo	—	—

31 March 1973

Sierra Leone	1–1	Mali
Goal		Bocoum 39'

Freetown
28 April 1973

Mali	4–2	Sierra Leone

Stade Mamadou Konaté, Bamako

Mali won 5–3 on aggregate.

8 April 1973

Ghana	3–2	Senegal

Accra Sports Stadium, Accra
21 April 1973

Senegal	1–0	Ghana
Penalties
	3–5

Stade Demba Diop, Dakar

Ghana won 5–3 on penalties after 3–3 on aggregate.

8 April 1973

Central African Republic	4–2	Ivory Coast

Bangui
22 April 1973

Ivory Coast	2–1 Abandoned	Central African Republic

Stade Félix Houphouët-Boigny, Abidjan
29 July 1973

Ivory Coast	5–1	Central African Republic

Surulere Stadium, Lagos

Ivory Coast won 7–5 on aggregate.

8 April 1973

Ethiopia	2–1	Tanzania

Haile Selassie Stadium, Addis Ababa
22 April 1973

Tanzania	3–0	Ethiopia

National Stadium, Dar es Salaam

Tanzania won 4–2 on aggregate.

8 April 1973

Lesotho	0–0	Mauritius

Maseru
22 April 1973

Mauritius	5–1	Lesotho

Port Louis

Mauritius won 5–1 on aggregate.

13 April 1973

Sudan	1–1	Nigeria

Khartoum Stadium, Khartoum
21 April 1973

Nigeria	2–1	Sudan

Surulere Stadium, Lagos

Nigeria won 3–2 on aggregate.

15 April 1973

Upper Volta	0–5	Zaire
		Kembo Uba Kembo

Ouagadougou
22 April 1973

Zaire	4–1	Upper Volta
Kembo Uba Kembo

Stade du 20 Mai, Kinshasa

Zaire won 9–1 on aggregate.

15 April 1973

Uganda	1–0	Kenya
Mukasa 3'

Nakivubo Stadium, Kampala
28 April 1973

Kenya	1–2	Uganda
Chitechi 20'		Mukasa 30'; Semwanga 50' (pen.)

Nairobi City Stadium, Nairobi

Uganda won 3–1 on aggregate.

22 April 1973

Zambia	3–1	Madagascar
Mugala 4', 58'; Chitalu 65'		Goal

Dag Hammarskjöld Stadium, Ndola
5 June 1973

Madagascar	2–1	Zambia
Goal		Chitalu 43'

Antananarivo

Zambia won 4–3 on aggregate.

Algeria	Cancelled	Libya
		Withdrew

Algeria progress, Libya withdrew.

Cameroon	Cancelled	Niger
		Withdrew

Cameroon progress, Niger withdrew.

Guinea	Cancelled	Togo
		Withdrew

Guinea progress, Togo withdrew.

=== Second round ===
Team 1	Agg.	Team 2	1st leg	2nd leg
Cameroon	2–3	Zaire	2–1	0–2
Mali	3–3 (6–7 p)	Guinea	2–2	1–1
Uganda	3–2	Algeria	2–1	1–1
Tanzania	1–1 (3–4 p)	Mauritius	1–1	0–0
Ghana	0–4	Ivory Coast	0–3	0–1
Zambia	7–4	Nigeria	5–1	2–3

27 May 1973

Cameroon	2–1	Zaire
		Kembo Uba Kembo

Ahmadou Ahidjo Stadium, Yaoundé
14 June 1973

Zaire	2–0	Cameroon
Kembo Uba Kembo

Stade du 20 Mai, Kinshasa

Zaire won 3–2 on aggregate.

27 May 1973

Mali	2–2	Guinea

Stade Mamadou Konaté, Bamako
14 June 1973

Guinea	1–1	Mali
Penalties
	7–6

Conakry

Guinea won 7–6 on penalties after 3–3 on aggregate.

27 May 1973

Uganda	2–1	Algeria
Mukasa; Obua		Gamouh 33'

Nakivubo Stadium, Kampala
Attendance: 30,000
14 June 1973

Algeria	1–1	Uganda
Hadefi 52' (pen.)		Ouma 66'

5 July Stadium, Algiers
Attendance: 13,481
Referee: ... (Egypt)

Uganda won 3–2 on aggregate.

27 May 1973

Tanzania	1–1	Mauritius

National Stadium, Dar es Salaam
14 June 1973

Mauritius	0–0	Tanzania
Penalties
	4–3

Port Louis

Mauritius won 4–3 on penalties after 1–1 on aggregate.

9 September 1973

Ghana	0–3	Ivory Coast
		Pokou ? ?

Accra Sports Stadium, Accra
23 September 1973

Ivory Coast	1–0	Ghana

Stade Félix Houphouët-Boigny, Abidjan

Ivory Coast won 4–0 on aggregate.

15 July 1973

Zambia	5–1	Nigeria
Chanda 31'; Kaushi 58', 70'; Sinyangwe 60', 75' (pen.)		Iziebige 20'

Independence Stadium, Lusaka
Referee: ... (Lesotho)
29 July 1973

Nigeria	3–2	Zambia
Goal		Kaushi; Chanda

Surulere Stadium, Lagos

Zambia won 7–4 on aggregate.

== Qualified teams ==
The 8 qualified teams are:

- Congo (holders)
- Egypt (hosts)
- Guinea
- Ivory Coast
- Mauritius
- Uganda
- Zaire
- Zambia
