= Mbungu =

Mbungu is a Kikongo surname and given name. Notable people with the surname include:

- Mbungu Ekofa (born 1948), Congolese footballer
- Serge Mputu Mbungu (born 1980), Congolese footballer
- Taty Mbungu, Congolese footballer
