= Edwin Mbaso =

Zambian footballer (1953-1979)

Personal information
- Date of birth: 1953
- Place of birth: Ndola, Northern Rhodesia
- Date of death: 28 January 1979 (aged 25–26)
- Place of death: Ndola, Zambia
- Position: Right back

Youth career
- 1969–1970: Ndola Wolves

Senior career*
Years	Team	Apps	(Gls)
1970–1979	Ndola United		

International career
1973–1977	Zambia	24	(1)
- * Club domestic league appearances and goals

Edwin Maso (1953 – 28 January 1979) was a Zambian footballer who featured for his country during their first ever African Cup of Nations appearance in Egypt in 1974. A full-back for Ndola United, Mbaso was crowned Zambian Footballer of the Year in 1975.

== Playing career ==
Mbaso was born in Ndola and according to a profile published when he won the 1975 Zambian Footballer of the Year award, he never played football in primary school and only took up the game when he was about 15 years old.

He attended Masala Secondary School in Ndola where he played football for the first time in 1968. He joined amateur side Ndola Wolves as a right winger in 1969 and the following year, got a transfer to Kansenshi Secondary School and signed for Division I side Ndola United in the same year. Halfway through the season, Mbaso opted to go back to Wolves for the rest of the year as he missed his friends who had remained at the amateur club. He returned to United in 1971 and after completing school, continued his football career and developed in leaps and bounds leading to his crowning as the club's Footballer of the Year for 1973 and his appointment as Ndola United captain despite his tender age.

After representing Zambia at CAN 1974, he got further recognition when he was named Zambian Footballer of the Year for 1975, only the second defender to do achieve that after Dickson Makwaza in 1973.

He continued featuring as a right fullback for a strong Ndola team which also featured Kaiser Kalambo and Gibbon Chewe and finished third in the league in 1976. Ndola were thus picked to represent Zambia in the 1977 African Cup Winners Cup though their campaign was short-lived as they were eliminated in the first round by Rangers International of Tanzania when they lost 2–1 at home and drew the second leg 1–1 in Dar Es Salaam. Mbaso however missed the second leg after the club revealed that he had skipped camp and turned up when the rest of the team were already at the airport so it was decided to leave him behind. He later apologized, but got a reprimand and a fine for his transgression.

Mbaso continued featuring for Ndola but was on the verge of switching to FAZ Division III outfit Zambia Eagles early in 1979 when he met his death. His younger brother Philip also played for Ndola in the late 1970s.

== National team ==
Mbaso was first selected for the ‘B’ side during Zambia's first foray in the East and Central Africa (ECA) tournament in Uganda in September 1973. Zambia and Uganda national football team ended up with identical records in Group 1 so they were involved in a play-off to see who would participate in the semi-finals.

Zambia lost the play-off 2–1 with Mbaso featuring in all the three matches and he made his full international debut on 12 December 1973 in a 3-1 Jamhuri Cup defeat to Kenya. He made enough of an impression to be included in the Zambian contingent at CAN 1974 in Egypt.

Unlike other players like Ackim Musenge, Peter M’hango, Edward Musonda and Nelson Musumali who filled the fullback positions but were actually central defenders or midfielders at their clubs, Mbaso's defensive qualities were noticed by Zambian coach Ante Buselic while playing as a right winger for Ndola United and he was converted into a fullback who could attack as well. After M'hango got injured, Mbaso started Zambia's first game at the Cup of Nations tournament against Côte d'Ivoire national football team which they won 1–0. The 21 year old Mbaso impressed and ended up featuring in all six games as Zambia went all the way to the final which they lost to Congo DR national football team after a replay.

Mbaso featured for Zambia when the country hosted the East and Central Africa Tournament in 1975 only to make an early exit after losing both games at the group stage. He was then left out of the team that was picked to represent Zambia at the Montreal Olympic Games along with Boniface Simutowe, Brighton Sinyangwe, Evans Katebe and Beawell Chibwe for reportedly being unfit but he made a comeback in February 1977 when Zambia defeated Uganda 4–3 on aggregate in a 1978 World Cup qualifier. He scored his only goal for Zambia, a penalty, when they beat Malawi 8–1 in a friendly in Lusaka in March 1977.

Mbaso was also part of the team that defeated Algeria 6–5 on penalties to qualify to CAN 1978 later that same year. His last game for Zambia turned out to be a goalless draw with Egypt on 31 July 1977 as Zambia failed to overturn a 2-0 first leg deficit in a 1978 World Cup qualifier and he was left out of that year's ECA tournament and subsequently, missed out on CAN 1978 in Ghana.

== Death ==
In early January 1979, Mbaso left his employment with Ndola United's sponsors Ndola City Council to join Zambia Airways, and was preparing to join the airline's FAZ Division III outfit Zambia Eagles when tragedy struck. Around midnight on 27 January 1979, Mbaso and his brother Philip were riding in the back of a truck in Ndola and Mbaso fell out when the truck made a turn and he sustained injuries to the head. Although he was rushed to Ndola Central Hospital, he died the following afternoon at the age of 26.

No foul play was suspected in his death and according to the official police report of the accident, Mbaso and his younger brother Philip were sitting on the shunting horse of the truck and when it turned to join another road, Mbaso fell off. The driver of the truck stopped and found Mbaso bleeding profusely from the nose and mouth and rushed him to Ndola Central Hospital where he died the following day, leaving behind a wife and two children. He was put to rest on 30 January 1979.

== Aftermath ==
Events after Mbaso's death led to one of the biggest hits in Zambian music history Mukamfwilwa (widow) by a group called The Five Revolutions which tells the story of a Ndola woman who soon after her husband's death, starts frequenting bars and night clubs. Although the song's composer band member John Mwansa denied that the song was directed at any one, Mbaso's widow Barbara Chibulu Mbaso felt that the lyrics of the song were aimed at her and sued for libel and slander. The courts however dismissed the case because the song did not mention anyone by name.

Shortly after the court's ruling, another band called the Mulemena Boys released a song entitled Teiwe Bembile, which translates into “They were not singing about you,” and contained lyrics asking a widow if she was the only one who had lost a husband. Once again there was no reference to anyone by name and this time Barbara took no action.

Barbara would go on to become a very successful businesswoman and years later, she joined politics and contested the Bwana Mkubwa seat in the 2006 Parliamentary Elections on the Movement for Multi-party Democracy (MMD) ticket but lost to the Patriotic Front (PF)’s Joseph Zulu. She petitioned the results claiming she lost due to character assassination by PF cadres who played the Mukamfwilwa song every morning during campaigns in an apparent attack on her. Once again, the courts did not rule in her favour. Barbara Mbaso died in 2010.

== Honours ==
- Zambian Footballer of the Year: 1975
