= Tubilandu Ndimbi =

Congolese footballer (1948–2021)

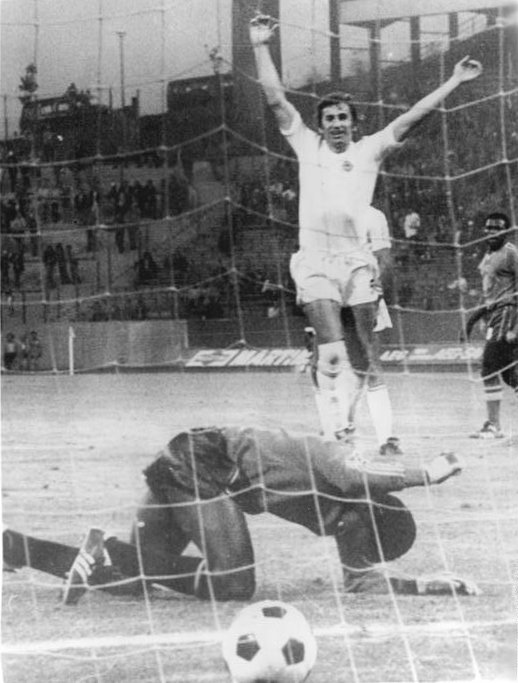
- Tubilandu (front)

Personal information
- Full name: Albert Tubilandu Ndimbi
- Date of birth: 15 March 1948
- Place of birth: Léopoldville, Belgian Congo
- Date of death: 17 June 2021 (aged 73)
- Place of death: Kinshasa, Democratic Republic of the Congo
- Height: 1.68 m (5 ft 6 in)
- Position: Goalkeeper

Senior career*
Years	Team	Apps	(Gls)
- AS Vita Club

International career
1974–1985	Zaire		
Medal record
Men's Football
Representing Zaire
Africa Cup of Nations
Winner	1974 Egypt
- * Club domestic league appearances and goals

Albert Tubilandu Ndimbi (15 March 1948 – 17 June 2021) was a Congolese football goalkeeper who played for Zaire in the 1974 FIFA World Cup. He also played for AS Vita Club.

== Career ==
Born in Léopoldville, Ndimbi appeared in his team's second match in the 1974 World Cup against Yugoslavia. Zaire was 3–0 down, and they substituted goalkeeper Kazadi with Tubilandu in the 21st minute. This was the first instance of a goalkeeper substitution in the World Cup for any other reason than injury. Unfortunately, Tubilandu's first task was to pick the ball out the net after Ivan Buljan's free kick was headed in by Josip Katalinski. Yugoslavia were 6–0 up by half time, and they eventually won 9–0.

As late as 1985, Tubilandu was still playing for Zaire, appearing in a 1986 African Cup of Nations qualifying match versus the Republic of the Congo in Brazzaville.

Tubilandu hailed from the Kinshasa commune of Matete. He retired from football in 1989. He died in the Clinique Ngaliema in Kinshasa on 17 June 2021, after a long period of illness.

== Honours ==
Zaire

- African Cup of Nations: 1974
