= Taty Mbungu =

Congolese footballer (born 1954)

Personal information
- Date of birth: 1 October 1954 (age 72)
- Place of birth: Léopoldville, Belgian Congo
- Position: Midfielder

Senior career*
Years	Team	Apps	(Gls)
- AS Vita Club

International career
1974–1985	Zaire		
Medal record
Men's Football
Representing Zaire
Africa Cup of Nations
Winner	1974 Egypt
- * Club domestic league appearances and goals

Taty Mbungu (born 1 October 1954) is a Congolese former footballer who played as a midfielder. At international level, he represented the Zaire national team, participating in the 1974 Africa Cup of Nations competition. As late as 1985, Mbungu was still playing for Zaire, appearing in a 1986 African Cup of Nations qualifying match versus the Republic of the Congo in Brazzaville.

He also featured in a documentary to commemorate the victory.

In 2006, he was temporarily the sporting director of AS Vita Club.

== Honours ==
Zaire

- African Cup of Nations: 1974
