= Kafula Ngoie =

Congolese footballer

Personal information
- Date of birth: 11 November 1945 (age 80)
- Place of birth: Belgian Congo
- Position: Midfielder

Senior career*
| Years | Team | Apps | (Gls) |
- TP Mazembe

International career
- Zaire
Medal record
Men's Football
Representing Zaire
Africa Cup of Nations
| Winner | 1974 Egypt |
- * Club domestic league appearances and goals

Kafula Ngoie (born 11 November 1945) is a Congolese football midfielder who played for Zaire in the 1974 FIFA World Cup. He also played for TP Mazembe.

== Honours ==
Zaire

- African Cup of Nations: 1974
