= Soriba Soumah =

Guinean footballer

Personal information
- Full name: Soriba Soumah
- Date of birth: 1946
- Place of birth: Conakry, French Guinea
- Date of death: 11 June 2004 (aged 57)
- Place of death: Conakry, Guinea
- Height: 1.77 m (5 ft 9 1/2 in)
- Position: Forward

Senior career*
| Years | Team | Apps | (Gls) |
| 1967–1985 | Hafia | | |

International career
| 1968 | Guinea U23 | 3 | (0) |
| 1966–1975 | Guinea | 26 | (7) |
- * Club domestic league appearances and goals

Soriba Soumah (1946 – 11 June 2004), also known as Edenté, was a Guinea international football forward.

== Career ==
Born in Conakry, Soumah played club football for local side Hafia F.C.

Soumah represented Guinea at the 1968 Summer Olympics in Mexico City. He also made several appearances for the senior Guinea national football team, including six FIFA World Cup qualifying matches, and played at the 1970 and 1974 African Cup of Nations finals.

== Personal ==
Soumah died at age 57 on 11 June 2004.
