= Kaiser Kalambo =

Zambian footballer and coach (1953-2014)

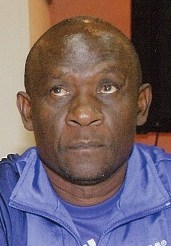

Personal information
- Date of birth: 6 July 1953
- Place of birth: Luanshya, Northern Rhodesia
- Date of death: 18 March 2014 (aged 60)
- Place of death: Lusaka
- Positions: Defender; midfielder

Senior career*
Years	Team	Apps	(Gls)
1970–1973	Roan United		
1973–1983	Ndola United		
1984–1986	Ndola Lime FC		

International career
1973–1982	Zambia		

Managerial career
- 1984–1986: Ndola Lime F.C.
- 1987: Vitafoam United F.C.
- 1989–1991: Township Rollers
- 1992–1996: Blue Diamonds F.C.
- 1996–1998: BMC
- 1999–2009: Blue Diamonds F.C.
- 2009–2010: Konkola Blades F.C.
- 2011: National Assembly F.C
- * Club domestic league appearances and goals

Kaiser Kalambo (6 July 1953 – 18 March 2014) was a Zambian coach and former footballer. He represented Zambia in three African Cup of Nations tournaments and was named Zambian captain in 1980, the same year in which he was voted Zambian footballer of the year. He later coached several club sides in Zambia and Botswana.

== Early life ==
Kalambo was born in Luanshya to January and Namwiba Kalambo. His father was a miner and he had seven siblings, three of which were girls. He attended Luanshya Central School and Luanshya Boys Secondary School and joined Luanshya side Roan United in 1970 as a defensive midfielder. He later completed his secondary school education at Masala Secondary School in Ndola after joining Ndola United.

== Playing career ==
In his first season with Roan, he helped the club reach the final of the Shell Challenge Cup which they narrowly lost 3–2 to Kabwe Warriors. The following year, he played for Zambia Schools and did not miss a game for the three years that he played in the team.

He crossed over to Ndola United in August 1973 and made his debut in a Chibuku Cup second round tie against his old club Roan United, scoring the winning goal in a 2–1 win. This however proved costly to Ndola as the Zambian National Football League ruled that Kalambo was still registered with Roan as the transaction between the two clubs had not been finalised, and Ndola were kicked out of the competition.

Short in stature but very strong on the ball with terrier like qualities, Kalambo was nicknamed 'KK' and was very reliable. He regularly appeared on the score sheet and scored quite a few from free-kicks. He was a regular in Ndola's line-up as they finished third in the league in 1975 and 1976. Ndola's reward was being entered as Zambia's representatives in the Africa Cup Winners Cup in 1977. Their campaign was however short-lived as they were eliminated in the first round by Rangers International of Tanzania when they lost 2–1 at home and drew the second leg in Tanzania 1–1.

He inspired his team to an Independence Cup final appearance where they lost to Division I newcomers Power Dynamos 7–6 on post-match penalties in October 1979. The following season, Ndola were again in another final, this time in the Challenge Cup and a decade after his first disappointment, Kalambo struck gold as United gunned down Green Buffaloes 3–2 after extra-time in Lusaka with the odds heavily stacked against them, Harrison Bwalya setting them on their way with two goals. Eyebrows were raised when Kalambo, who was captain and player-coach of the side was substituted soon after half time but the club later clarified that he had had severe flu three days before the game but had pledged to put in some effort in the first half. At the end of the season, Kalambo was rewarded with the Footballer of the Year award.

In 1984, he joined Ndola Lime FC as player-coach and stayed with the team for two seasons after which he quit playing to concentrate on coaching.

== National team ==
Kalambo first played for Zambia Schools from 1971 to 1973 before making his debut in a World Cup qualifier against Ethiopia on 15 April 1973 when he replaced Ackim Musenge in midfield. When left-back Edward Musonda was shown a red-card, coach Ante Buselic delegated Kalambo to cover the left-back position. The diminutive player accounted for himself well with his tackling, overlapping and accurate crossing and ended up occupying the position permanently.

He was part of Zambia's team at their first ever CAN outing at Egypt 1974 and played in the group phase match against Uganda which Zambia won 1–0, making a vital block of a goal-bound shot and helped Zambia qualify to the semi-finals. Afterwards, Kalambo said Buselic gave him the starting berth because he knew the Ugandans as he had played them during his time with Zambia Schools.

In 1977, Kalambo was left out of the team by the FAZ for asking for money for the players after a World Cup qualifier against Egypt. Anon. "Four veterans remain behind" Times of Zambia, 22 November 1977, p. 8 As a result, he missed that year's CECAFA tournament but was reinstated due to a noticeable weakness in the left-back position and fans demanded his return. Kalambo said he was looking forward to playing for Zambia again and said that differences with the FAZ had been ironed out. He was therefore a member of the Ghana '78 contingent that was knocked out in the first round.

In 1980, Kalambo was in the side that reached the final of the Zimbabwe Independence Tournament, after which he was made captain. Zambia was knocked out of the Olympics race by Egypt 5–2 on aggregate, but when Egypt pulled out for political reasons Zambia took their place and Kalambo led his country to Moscow 1980 where Zambia were knocked out in the group stage with three defeats to Cuba, the USSR and Venezuela.

Although he led Zambia to CAN 1982 he was carrying an injury and after recovering, only featured once in the third and fourth play-off win over Algeria, due to the emergence of the impressive young left-back John Kalusa of Rhokana United. He was handed a midfield role but was substituted at half-time. This turned out to be his last game for Zambia.

== Coaching career ==
Kalambo was involved in coaching from as far back as 1978 when Coach Freddie Mwila left Ndola United. He was also United's chief scout and used his position as Community Development Officer at the council, Ndola's sponsors, to recruit the best players from the townships of the city. He coached Ndola Lime FC in 1984–86 and then moved to town-mates Vitafoam United but left after the 1987 season when they were relegated from the top league when they lost their last league game at home to champions Kabwe Warriors.

Kalambo left to join Township Rollers of Botswana in 1989, where he won the Gilbeys Cup and the Independence Cup. He then moved to Blue Diamonds 1992 and stayed there until 1996 after which he switched over to Botswana Meat Commission the following year. He returned to Blue Diamonds in 1999.

After 20 years in Botswana, he returned to Zambia and took charge of Konkola Blades in 2010 but was released after just seven games. He then moved to Lusaka and coached National Assembly Football Club in 2011 though he was dismissed after some poor results.

== Death ==
Kalambo died at the age of 60 at Lusaka's University Teaching Hospital after suffering from prostate cancer.
