= Gaston N'Ganga-Muivi =

Republic of Congo footballer

Personal information
- Place of birth: Congo
- Position: Defender

International career
Years	Team	Apps	(Gls)
1976–1978	People's Republic of the Congo	3	(0)

Gaston N'Ganga-Muivi was a Congolese football player who played for People's Republic of the Congo in the 1978 African Cup of Nations.
