= Marinho Peres =

Brazilian footballer (1947–2023)

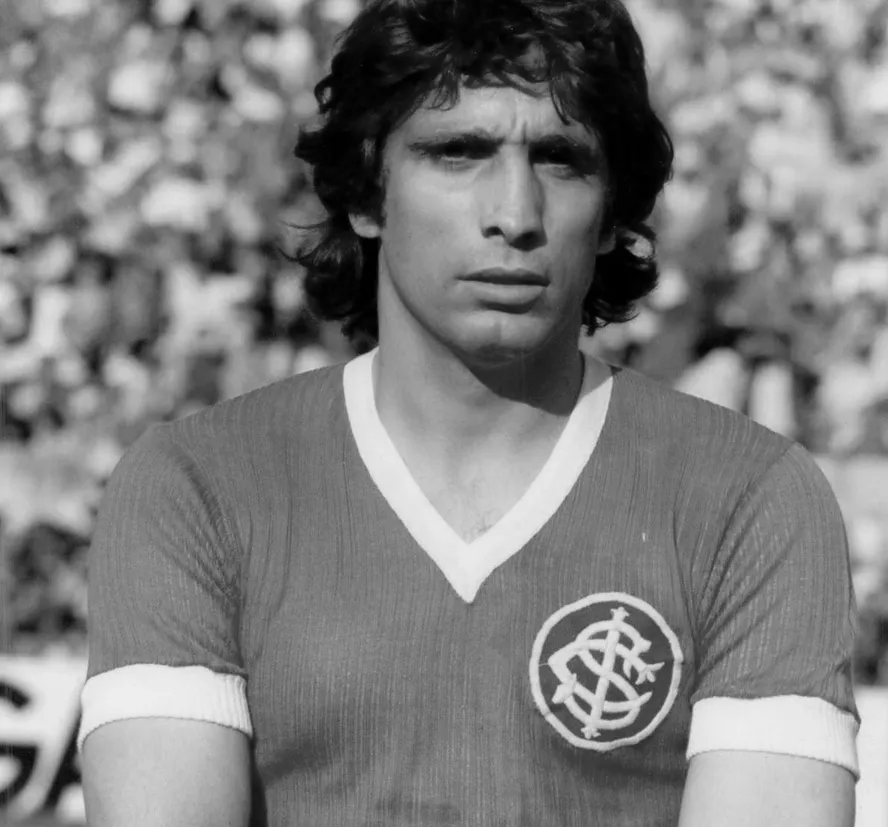
- Marinho Peres in 1976

Personal information
- Full name: Mário Peres Ulibarri
- Date of birth: 19 March 1947
- Place of birth: Sorocaba, São Paulo, Brazil
- Date of death: 18 September 2023 (aged 76)
- Place of death: Sorocaba, São Paulo, Brazil
- Position: Centre-back

Senior career*
Years	Team	Apps	(Gls)
1965–1967	São Bento		
1967–1971	Portuguesa		
1972–1974	Santos		
1974–1976	Barcelona		
1976–1977	Internacional		
1977–1980	Galícia		
1980–1981	América-RJ		

International career
1972–1974	Brazil	15	(1)

Managerial career
- 1981–1982: América-RJ
- 1986–1987: Vitória de Guimarães
- 1987–1988: Belenenses
- 1988: Santos
- 1988–1989: Belenenses
- 1990–1992: Sporting
- 1992–1993: Vitória de Guimarães
- 1995–1996: União São João
- 1996–1997: Botafogo
- 1997–1998: Marítimo
- 1998: El Salvador
- 2000–2003: Belenenses
- 2003: Juventude
- 2006: Paysandu
- 2008: Santos
- 2009: Aviação
- 2011: Belenenses
- * Club domestic league appearances and goals

Mário Peres Ulibarri (19 March 1947 – 18 September 2023), known as Marinho Peres, was a Brazilian footballer who played as a centre-back, in particular with Sport Club Internacional and the Brazil national team. He captained the Brazil team to fourth place at the World Cup 1974. He became a coach after retiring.

== International career ==
Peres earned 15 caps (3 non official) with the Brazil national team (one goal). He played during the 1974 FIFA World Cup (seven games, fourth place).

== Death ==
Marinho Peres died on 18 September 2023, at the age of 76.

== Honours ==
=== As a player ===
Santos

- Campeonato Paulista: 1973

Internacional

- Campeonato Brasileiro: 1976
- Campeonato Gaúcho: 1976

=== As a coach ===
Belenenses

- Taça de Portugal: 1989

Botafogo

- Taça Guanabara: 1997

Paysandu

- Campeonato Paraense: 2006
