= Bernard Chanda =

Zambian footballer (1952-1993)

- Chanda in 1975

Personal information
- Date of birth: 1952
- Place of birth: Luanshya, Northern Rhodesia
- Date of death: 16 May 1993 (aged 40–41)
- Place of death: Luanshya, Zambia
- Position: Forward

Senior career*
Years	Team	Apps	(Gls)
1966–1968	Buseko F.C.		
1969–1971	Roan United F.C.		(43+)
1971–1973	Mufulira Wanderers F.C.		
1974–1981	Rokana United F.C.	431	(231)
1982	Mutondo Stars F.C.		
Total		431+	(254+)

International career
1970–1980	Zambia	68	(29)

Managerial career
- 1983–1984: Mutondo Stars F.C.
- 1985: Gaborone United S.C.
- 1986–1988: Kafue Textiles F.C.
- 1988–1991: Roan United F.C.
- 1991–1993: Ndola Lime F.C.
- * Club domestic league appearances and goals

Bernard Chanda was one of Zambia's greatest strikers and was the league top scorer three times. Nicknamed 'Bomber,' he played for three of Zambia's biggest clubs – Roan United, Mufulira Wanderers and Rokana United, and is remembered for scoring a hat-trick in the 4–2 semi-final victory over Congo at the 1974 African Cup of Nations tournament. Chanda was voted Zambian Footballer of the Year in 1974 and is fourth on the list of all-time goal scorers for Zambia in international matches behind Godfrey Chitalu, Alex Chola and Kalusha Bwalya with 29 goals.

== Playing career ==
Chanda was born in Luanshya in 1952 and first turned out for amateur side Buseko United in the mid-sixties. He went to Roan Antelope Secondary School and later joined Roan United where he burst onto the scene as Roan's top scorer in 1969 and was selected to the Zambia Schools national team. He was still a schoolboy when he was called to the national team when Zambia faced off against visiting French side RC de Strasbourg in June 1970 and was again his club's top marksman that season, finishing as one of the country's leading goal-scorers in 4th place with 43 goals behind eventual winner Sandy Kaposa of Kabwe Warriors, his clubmate Boniface Simutowe and Kitwe United's Godfrey 'Ucar' Chitalu.

A born goal-scorer, Chanda was a striker in the classic mould with powerful shooting and great control. When he expressed his desire to leave Roan during the 1971 season, the club suspended him for six months to ward off interest from Wanderers and Rokana until the Football Association of Zambia (FAZ) moved in to pave the way for his transfer to Mufulira in August 1971 and within two months, had won his first piece of silverware when the 'Mighty' men coincidentally met Roan in the Castle Cup final at Dag Hammarskjoeld Stadium on 10 October 1971 in Ndola and prevailed 5–4 with Chanda sharing the goals with Samuel 'Zoom' Ndhlovu and Abraham Nkole who scored a hat-trick. That same month, he made his debut for Zambia a week later in a 2–0 defeat to Kenya at the same stadium, in the Peter Stuyvesant series of matches. He scored his first goal for Zambia in the next match in the series when Zambia turned the tables with a 3–1 victory in Kitwe before losing the deciding match 1–0 in Lusaka.

On 15 July 1973, Zambia met Nigeria in Lusaka in the final qualifying round for the 1974 Cup of Nations. Nigeria took a 20th-minute lead through Iziebige but Chanda equalised in the 31st minute and was brought down for a penalty in the second half which Brighton Sinyangwe converted. In the end, Nigeria were taught a footballing lesson by the mesmerising Zambians as Simon Kaushi and Sinyangwe each scored 2 goals for a 5–1 scoreline. In the return leg, Chanda and Kaushi were once again on the score-sheet as Nigeria edged Zambia 3–2 in Lagos which was enough to see Zambia through to her very first CAN tournament. He scored a fantastic volley when Zambia crushed Morocco 4–0 in a World Cup qualifier in Lusaka in October and won a second Castle Cup with Wanderers.

At the end of the season, he tied with Chitalu for the top scorer's award with 41 goals. Chanda would probably have finished the season as outright top scorer had he not decided to boycott matches to force through his transfer from Wanderers to Rhokana United. At first, the Mufulira side was reluctant to release him but they relented and he moved to Kitwe for the then record fee in Zambian football of K4,000. With his distinctive afro hair-style, he earned the nickname 'Bomber' due to his lethal finishing and the devastation he would wreak on many an opposing defence.

At the Cup of Nations, he led Zambia's attack playing every minute of every game and confining Chitalu to the bench in some of the matches. He scored a stunning hat-trick in the semi-final against defending champions Congo, after the two teams had been deadlocked 2–2 at full-time. No Zambian player would score a hat-trick at the CAN for 22 years. A panel of international journalists voted Chanda among the best players at the tournament together with Kaushi, Dick Chama and goalkeeper Emmanuel Mwape.

In December of that year, Chanda tormented his former club Wanderers and scored a hat-trick as Rhokana beat Wanderers 4–3 to win the Chibuku Cup, their first piece of silverware since 1969 and their last trophy for eight years. At the end of the season, he was named Footballer of the Year from a field which included other big names like Dickson Makwaza, Chitalu, Chama and Mwape.

In June 1975, the national team travelled to Mozambique for that country's independence sports festival and Chanda was kicked out of the team by the Team Manager Eliya Mwanza for alleged unruly behaviour when he told the coach Henry Kalimukwa that his family was suffering while he was playing soccer away from home and that he was prepared to go back to work rather than play football for the national team. However, he could not leave as flights were fully booked so he spent the rest of the trip with the basketball team and returned home with the rest of the contingent.

On 20 August 1975, Chanda and his Rokana United teammates Mark Masumbuko, Nelson Sapi and Roan United's Joseph Mapulanga were suspended from the national team for the rest of the season for not reporting to camp for an Olympic Games qualifier against Malawi. Chanda was also fined K50 for his conduct in Mozambique. His response was that he had written to coach Ante Buselic on 11 August informing him of his personal problems. "It's a great shock to me because I did not refuse to go to camp. In the letter I explained to the coach about my problems and I indicated I would join the team later." He further said that he and the other three suspended players were not called before the disciplinary committee to personally give their side of the story but only learnt about it in the press.

On his conduct in Mozambique, Chanda said "I was not called to defend myself. Honestly I don't think anything serious happened. It was mere talk between me and the coach and I cannot comment further about it." However, the punishment stood and Chanda missed that year's East and Central Africa (ECA) tournament which Zambia hosted and were knocked out in the group stages.

On his return the following season Chanda scored a late equaliser to rescue Zambia in a 2–2 draw with Sudan in an Olympic Games qualifier in Ndola. Zambia won the second leg 5–4 on penalties after a goalless deadlock, with Chanda scoring in the shootout. He featured for Zambia in the East and Central Africa Cup in Zanzibar where they went all the way to the final only to lose to Uganda 2–0. In November 1976, Chanda announced that he had decided not to play in his team's remaining three matches because he was tired and needed a rest. He also stated that there was too much bickering and criticism towards him. In spite of this, he still finished the season as top scorer with 38 goals, 7 ahead of Chitalu.

In Sept 1977, Chanda who was in the news again for disciplinary reasons and was stripped of the captain's armband and suspended for one year with shorter sentences for Brighton Sinyangwe, Sapi and two other players. Accused of refusing to travel to Lusaka for a league match against Green Buffaloes, Chanda said he would not appeal against the ban. "Each time I am selected to represent Zambia in any tournament, the club suspends me. Now I have been suspended because Zambia will be playing in the Africa Cup finals in Ghana. He added that he was fed up with the whole business and that an inquiry into the administration at Rhokana needed to be done which he felt 'left much to be desired.'

In December 1977, Chanda dispelled rumours that he had signed a contract with a Saudi Arabian club and also reports that he had been approached by former national team coach Ante Buselic to play in Yugoslavia. As a consequence of his suspension, he missed that year's ECA tournament and CAN 1978. Chanda did not feature for Zambia in 1979 but when Zambia crashed 4–1 to Egypt in an Olympic Games qualifier in February 1980 in Cairo and with Chitalu suspended for the second leg, he was recalled by coach Dick Chama but he failed to inspire the team in a 0–0 draw. His last appearance for Zambia came in April 1980 when he replaced Alex Chola in a game against Tanzania during a tournament to celebrate Zimbabwe's independence.

== Coaching career ==
After almost ten years with Rhokana, Chanda switched camp to Kitwe rivals Mutondo Stars at the end of the 1981 season though his best days seemed to be behind him. He took up coaching and in 1985, he crossed over to Botswana to coach Gaborone United. He came back to Zambia in 1986 and became coach for Kafue Textiles FC, leading them to promotion to the Premier League in 1987 and for this feat, was nominated for the Coach of the Year award which went to Bizwell Phiri of Premier League champions Kabwe Warriors.

In June 1988 he left Kafue to return to Roan as assistant coach to Dickson Makwaza saying "I am now in Luanshya and with Roan. I like it here. It is nice to be home and I am happy." He later became coach at Roan and later moved to FAZ Division II North side Ndola Lime in 1991.

== Death ==
Chanda died on 16 May 1993 in Luanshya Mine Hospital after poor health, which saw his legs swelling and causing him to be hospitalised for three weeks prior to his death. He was laid to rest at Ndola's Kansenshi Cemetery and was survived by a wife Milika and three children.
