= Ashe Mukasa =

Ugandan footballer (born 1952)

Personal information
- Date of birth: April 1952 (age 74)
- Place of birth: Lungujja, Uganda
- Position: Midfielder

Senior career*
Years	Team	Apps	(Gls)
1969	Coffee		
1970–1972	NIC		
1972–1977	Express		
1978	KCC		
1979	Express		

International career
1973–1978	Uganda	1	(0)
- * Club domestic league appearances and goals

Ashe Mukasa (born April 1952) is a former Ugandan football midfielder who played for Uganda in the 1978 African Cup of Nations.

== Career ==
Born in the Lungujja neighborhood of Kampala, Mukasa began his career playing with local youth sides Nateete Young Stars and Nakivubo Boys. In 1969, he joined Coffee F.C. of the first division for one season. The following season, he moved to NIC F.C. in the second division.

In 1972, Mukasa returned to the first division with Express F.C., the club where would win two league titles in five seasons.

Mukasa played for Uganda at the 1974, 1976 and 1978 African Cup of Nations finals.
