= Kilasu Massamba =

Congolese footballer (1950–2020)

Personal information
- Full name: Victor Kilasu Massamba
- Date of birth: 24 November 1948
- Date of death: 25 June 2020 (aged 71)
- Position: Midfielder

Senior career*
Years	Team	Apps	(Gls)
- AS Dragons

International career
- Zaire
- * Club domestic league appearances and goals

Victor Kilasu Massamba (24 November 1948 – 25 June 2020) was a Congolese football midfielder who played for Zaire in the 1974 FIFA World Cup. He also played for AS Dragons.
