= Obby Kapita =

Zambian footballer and coach (died 2002)

Personal information
- Date of death: 29 June 2002 (aged 50)
- Place of death: Lusaka, Zambia
- Position: Striker

Senior career*
Years	Team	Apps	(Gls)
- Green Buffaloes

International career
- Zambia

Managerial career
- 1997: Zambia
- 1998: Zambia
- * Club domestic league appearances and goals

Obby Kapita (died 29 June 2002) was a Zambian football player and coach.

== Career ==
He played as a striker for Green Buffaloes and the Zambian national team.

He later served as national team manager.
