= Mavuba Mafuila =

Congolese footballer (1949–1997)

Personal information
- Full name: Ricky Mafuila Mavuba Ku-Mbundu
- Date of birth: 15 December 1949
- Place of birth: Léopoldville, Belgian Congo
- Date of death: 30 November 1996 (aged 46)
- Position: Defensive midfielder

Senior career*
Years	Team	Apps	(Gls)
1968–1979	AS Vita Club		
1980	1º de Agosto		

International career
- Zaire
Medal record
Men's Football
Representing Zaire
Africa Cup of Nations
Winner	1974 Egypt
- * Club domestic league appearances and goals

Ricky Mafuila Mavuba Ku-Mbundu (15 December 1949 – 30 November 1996) was a football player from Zaire, nicknamed The Black Sorcerer. His son Rio Mavuba is a former French international footballer.

== Biography ==
Born in Léopoldville, he competed for Zaire at the 1974 FIFA World Cup in Germany and also won the 1974 African Cup of Nations in Egypt defeating Zambia in a second game by 2–0.

Mavuba is remembered for taking direct free kicks and penalty kicks. He is credited as the first Congolese footballer to score directly from a corner kick, a curved shot that went straight into the net without deflections.

Following his football career, Mavuba moved to Angola. He fled the country with his family at the onset of the civil war in 1984 and lived as a refugee in France until his death in November 1996.

== Club career ==
Mavuba represented AS Vita Club of Kinshasa from 1968 to 1979, winning six league titles and the CAF Champions League in 1973.

== Honours ==
Zaire

- African Cup of Nations: 1974

== See also ==
- 1974 FIFA World Cup squads
