= Valdomiro (footballer, born 1946) =

Brazilian footballer

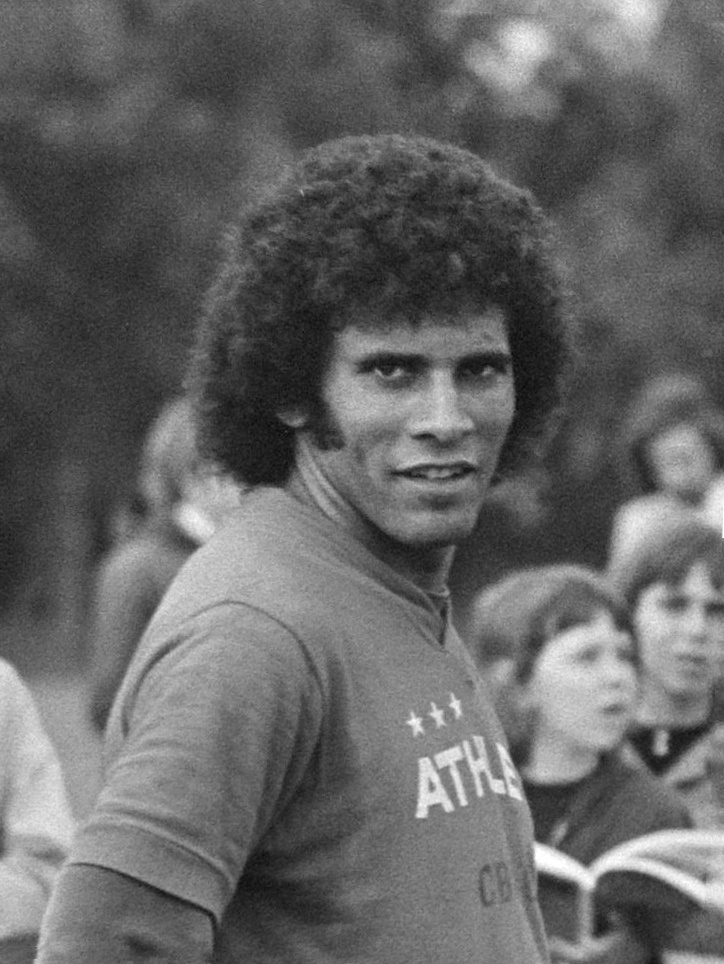
- Valdomiro in 1974

Personal information
- Full name: Valdomiro Vaz Franco
- Date of birth: 17 February 1946 (age 80)
- Place of birth: Criciúma, Brazil
- Height: 1.76 m (5 ft 9 1/2 in)
- Positions: Winger; striker

Senior career*
Years	Team	Apps	(Gls)
1965–1967	Comerciário	0	(3)
1968	Perdigão	0	(0)
1968–1980	Internacional	853	(192)
1980–1981	Millionarios	86	(20)
1982	Internacional	12	(1)
Total		951	(216)

International career
1973–1977	Brazil	23	(5)
- * Club domestic league appearances and goals

Valdomiro Vaz Franco, better known as Valdomiro (born 17 February 1946), is a former Brazilian footballer who played as a forward.

He played 17 matches For the Brazilian team between 1973 and 1977, and scored 5 goals. Valdomiro also participated at the 1974 FIFA World Cup, playing in 6 games and scoring one goal.

He scored for Internacional in their 1976 Campeonato Brasileiro Série A final victory over Corinthians, and Valdomiro put in a man of the match performance.

He played for the following clubs:

- Comerciário: 1965–1967
- Perdigão: 1968
- Internacional: 1968–1979
- Millionarios: 1980–1981
- Internacional: 1982

== Honours ==
Comerciário

- Campeonato Catarinense: 1968

Internacional

- Campeonato Gaúcho: 1969, 1970, 1971, 1972, 1973, 1974, 1975, 1976, 1978, 1982
- Campeonato Brasileiro Série A: 1975, 1976, 1979

Individual

- Bola de Prata: 1976
