= Jean Kalala N'Tumba =

Congolese footballer (1949–2021)

Personal information
- Full name: Jean Kalala N'Tumba
- Date of birth: 7 January 1949
- Place of birth: Luluabourg, Belgian Congo
- Date of death: 11 January 2021 (aged 72)
- Place of death: Orleans, France
- Position: Forward

Senior career*
Years	Team	Apps	(Gls)
1966-1968	Union Tshioto Saint Gilloise		
1968-1970	Rekas SC		
1971	Union Sud-Kasaïenne		
1971-1972	TV Tshipepele		
1972-1973	TP Mazembe		
1973-1975	AS Vita Club		

International career
1972–1974	Zaire	20	(7)
- * Club domestic league appearances and goals

Jean Kalala N'Tumba (7 January 1949 – 11 January 2021) was a Congolese football forward who played for Zaire in the 1974 FIFA World Cup. He also played for AS Vita Club.
