= Kembo Uba Kembo =

Congolese footballer (1947–2007)

Personal information
- Full name: Jean Pépé Kembo Uba-Kembo
- Date of birth: 27 December 1947
- Place of birth: Matete, Belgian Congo
- Date of death: 26 March 2007 (aged 59)
- Place of death: Kinshasa, Democratic Republic of the Congo
- Position: Midfielder

Senior career*
| Years | Team | Apps | (Gls) |
| 1967-1978 | AS Vita Club | | |

International career
| 1968–1976 | Congo-Kinshasa / Zaire | | |
Medal record
Men's Football
Representing Congo-Kinshasa
Africa Cup of Nations
| Winner | 1968 Ethiopia |
Men's Football
Representing Zaire
Africa Cup of Nations
| Winner | 1974 Egypt |
- * Club domestic league appearances and goals

Jean Kembo Uba-Kembo (27 December 1947 – 26 March 2007) was a Congolese football midfielder who played for Zaire in the 1974 FIFA World Cup.

== Early life ==
Born in Matete, Kembo played club football for AS Vita Club.

== Career ==
He made several appearances for Zaire, including appearances at the 1968 and 1974 African Cup of Nations finals. Kembo scored two goals in the decisive qualifier versus Morocco in a 3–0 win that clinched Zaire's place in the 1974 World Cup.

== Personal life ==
Kembo's son, Jirès Kembo Ekoko, was a professional footballer who played for Rennes.

== Honours ==
=== Player ===
AS Vita

- Linafoot: 1970, 1971, 1972, 1973, 1975, 1977
- Coupe du Congo (DR Congo): 1971, 1972, 1973, 1975, 1977
- African Cup of Champions Clubs: 1973

Congo-Kinshasa

- African Cup of Nations: 1968

Zaire

- African Cup of Nations: 1974

=== Individual ===
- CAF FIFA World Cup qualification top scorer: 1974 (6 goals)
- African Cup of Nations qualification top scorer: 1972 (8 goals), 1974 (12 goals),
