= Mbungu Ekofa =

Congolese football forward

Personal information
- Date of birth: 24 November 1947 (age 78)
- Place of birth: Belgian Congo
- Position: Forward

Senior career*
| Years | Team | Apps | (Gls) |
- SC Imana

International career
- Zaire
Medal record
Men's Football
Representing Zaire
Africa Cup of Nations
| Winner | 1974 Egypt |
- * Club domestic league appearances and goals

Mbungu Ekofa (born 24 November 1948) is a Congolese football forward who played for Zaire in the 1974 FIFA World Cup. He also played for SC Imana.

== Honours ==
Zaire

- African Cup of Nations: 1974
