= Bwanga Tshimen =

Congolese footballer

Personal information
- Full name: Raymond Bwanga Tshimenu
- Date of birth: 4 January 1949 (age 77)
- Place of birth: Élisabethville, Belgian Congo
- Position: Defender

Senior career*
Years	Team	Apps	(Gls)
1965-1981	TP Mazembe		

International career
1970–1976	Congo-Kinshasa/Zaire	28	(2)
Medal record
Men's Football
Representing Zaire
Africa Cup of Nations
Winner	1974 Egypt
- * Club domestic league appearances and goals

Raymond Bwanga Tshimenu (born 4 January 1949 in Élisabethville, Belgian Congo) is a former footballer from the Democratic Republic of the Congo. Bwanga won the 1973 African Footballer of the Year while with TP Mazembe in Lubumbashi. During his playing days in the early and mid 1970s he was nicknamed "Black Beckenbauer" by the African and French press due to his playing style.

Bwanga was voted the IFFHS Player of the Century for the Democratic Republic of the Congo in 2000. In 2006, he was selected by CAF as one of the best 200 African football players of the last 50 years.

He is the cousin of fellow footballer Kazadi Mwamba.

== Honours ==
Zaire

- African Cup of Nations: 1974
