= Kibonge Mafu =

Congolese footballer

Kibongé Mafu
Personal information
- Full name: Joseph Kibongé Mafu
- Date of birth: 12 February 1945 (age 81)
- Place of birth: Léopoldville, Belgian Congo
- Height: 1.76 m (5 ft 9 in)
- Position: Midfielder

Senior career*
Years	Team	Apps	(Gls)
1965–1972	CS Imana		
1973–1980	AS Vita Club		

International career
1965–1974	Congo-Kinshasa/Zaire	24	(0)
Medal record
Men's Football
Representing Congo-Kinshasa
Africa Cup of Nations
Winner	1968 Ethiopia
- * Club domestic league appearances and goals

Joseph Kibongé Mafu (born 12 February 1945) is a Congolese football midfielder who played for Zaire in the 1974 FIFA World Cup. He also played for AS Vita Club. In 1967, he appeared for the national team in two friendlies versus Pelé and his club Santos FC in Kinshasa.

== Honours ==
Congo-Kinshasa

- African Cup of Nations: 1968
