= Josip Katalinski =

Bosnian footballer and manager (1948–2011)

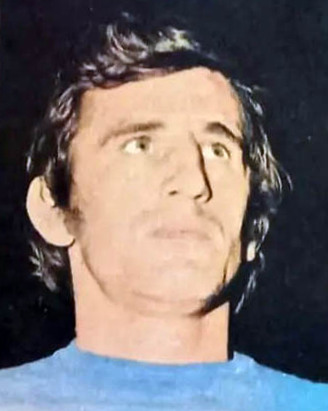
- Katalinski with Yugoslavia in 1974

Personal information
- Date of birth: 12 May 1948
- Place of birth: Sarajevo, PR Bosnia and Herzegovina, FPR Yugoslavia
- Date of death: 9 June 2011 (aged 63)
- Place of death: Sarajevo, Bosnia and Herzegovina
- Height: 1.81 m (5 ft 11 in)
- Position: Defender

Youth career
- –1964: Igman Ilidža
- 1964–1965: Željezničar

Senior career*
Years	Team	Apps	(Gls)
1965–1975	Željezničar	230	(32)
1975–1979	Nice	103	(28)
Total		333	(60)

International career
1972–1977	Yugoslavia	41	(10)

Managerial career
- 1998: Čelik Zenica
- * Club domestic league appearances and goals

Josip "Škija" Katalinski (12 May 1948 – 9 June 2011) was a Bosnian and Yugoslav professional football player and manager. He is of Bosnian Croat descent.

== Club career ==
Katalinski's career began in a small club Igman based in Ilidža, a suburb of Sarajevo. In 1964, when he was 15 years old, he was spotted by Željezničar coaches who offered him to join their club's youth system. He accepted the offer and a year later made his debut for the first team. Katalinski stayed with Željezničar for 11 seasons, during which he made 230 league appearances and scored 32 league goals. In total, he played more than 350 games for Željezničar, scoring more than 100 goals. He was a crucial player on the team that won the Yugoslav First League in the 1971–72 season.

In 1975, Katalinski signed a contract with French Ligue 1 club Nice where he played over 100 league matches before his career was abruptly cut short in 1978 due to a severe injury.

== International career ==
As a youngster, Katalinski played for the junior team of SR Bosnia and Herzegovina, and later for the Yugoslav junior national team (12 caps), as well as the Under-21 national team (18 caps). In 1972, he made his debut for the senior Yugoslavia national team. Over the next five years, he collected 41 caps and scored 10 goals.

One of the most famous moments of his career came during the play-off match of the 1974 World Cup qualifiers against Spain at Waldstadion in Frankfurt. Katalinski scored the only goal of the game and secured Yugoslavia's appearance at the 1974 FIFA World Cup, after the team had failed to qualify for the 1966 and 1970 editions. This goal propelled Katalinski to new heights, as he was proclaimed a 'national hero'. He was a member of the Yugoslav squads at the 1974 FIFA World Cup and the UEFA Euro 1976. His final international was a May 1977 FIFA World Cup qualification match against Romania.

== Managerial career ==
Katalinski worked as a youth coordinator for the Football Association of Bosnia and Herzegovina. He also worked as a fitness coach at several clubs, and, at one time, was the vice president at his favourite club Željezničar.

In 1998, he was, briefly, the head coach of Čelik Zenica.

== Death and memorial ==
On 9 June 2011, Katalinski died in Sarajevo, aged 63, after a long illness. In his memory, the Football Association of Bosnia and Herzegovina has been organizing the Josip Katalinski-Škija Memorial Tournament for youth teams since June 2012. In May 2024, the 12th edition of this memorial tournament was held in Sarajevo.

== Honours ==
=== Player ===
Željezničar

- Yugoslav First League: 1971–72

Individual

- Yugoslav Footballer of the Year: 1974
- Sport Ideal European XI: 1974, 1975
