= Mana Mamuwene =

Congolese footballer

Mana Mamuwené
Personal information
- Full name: Jean Mana Mamuwené
- Date of birth: 10 October 1947 (age 79)
- Place of birth: Belgian Congo
- Height: 1.67 m (5 ft 6 in)
- Position: Midfielder

Senior career*
Years	Team	Apps	(Gls)
1965-1973	SM Sanga Balende		
1974-1980	SC Imana		

International career
1973–1974	Zaire	20	(0)
Medal record
Men's Football
Representing Zaire
Africa Cup of Nations
Winner	1974 Egypt
- * Club domestic league appearances and goals

Jean Mana Mamuwené (born 10 October 1947) is a Congolese football midfielder who played for Zaire in the 1974 FIFA World Cup. He also played for SC Imana.

== Honours ==
Zaire

- African Cup of Nations: 1974
