= Sébastien Lakou =

Congolese footballer (1946 or 1947 – 2025)

Personal information
- Date of birth: 1946 or 1947
- Place of birth: French Congo
- Date of death: 28 September 2025 (aged 78)
- Position: Forward

International career
Years	Team	Apps	(Gls)
1974–1978	Congo	24	(3)

Sébastien Lakou (1946 or 1947 – 28 September 2025) was a Congolese football Forward who played for People's Republic of the Congo in the 1978 African Cup of Nations. Lakou died on 28 September 2025, at the age of 78.
