= Lobilo Boba =

Congolese football defender (born 1950)

Personal information
- Full name: Florian Lobilo Boba
- Date of birth: 10 April 1950 (age 76)
- Place of birth: Brazzaville, Congo
- Position: Defender

Senior career*
Years	Team	Apps	(Gls)
- AS Vita Club

International career
1973–1980	Zaire	21	(0)
Medal record
Men's Football
Representing Zaire
Africa Cup of Nations
Winner	1974 Egypt
- * Club domestic league appearances and goals

Florian Lobilo Boba (born 10 April 1950) is a Congolese football defender who played for Zaire in the 1974 FIFA World Cup.

== Career ==
Lobilo played for AS Vita Club, where he would win the 1973 African Cup of Champions Clubs.

He was in the Zaire squad that won the 1974 African Cup of Nations finals.

He made several appearances for Zaire in 1974 World Cup qualifying and appeared in one 1982 World Cup qualifying match; a 5–2 win over Mozambique on 13 July 1980.

In 2006, he was selected by CAF as one of the best 200 African football players of the last 50 years.

== Honours ==
Zaire

- African Cup of Nations: 1974
