= Mwanza Mukombo =

Congolese footballer (1945–2001)

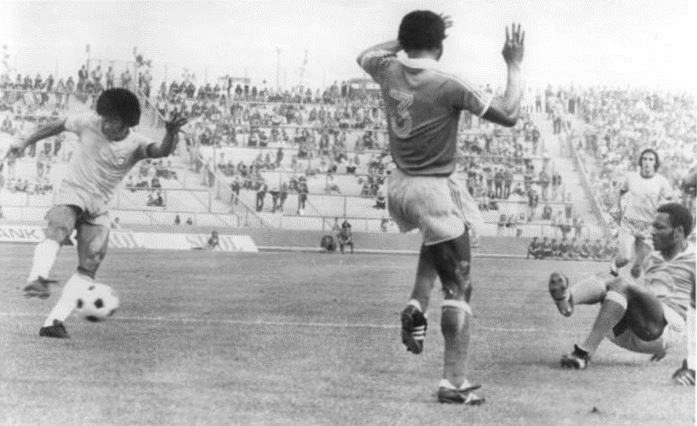
- Mwanza Mukombo (number 3) playing in the Zaire vs. Brazil match at the 1974 FIFA World Cup

Personal information
- Full name: Albert Mwanza Mukombo
- Date of birth: 17 December 1945
- Place of birth: Belgian Congo
- Date of death: 13 October 2001 (aged 55)
- Place of death: Kinshasa, DR Congo
- Height: 1.64 m (5 ft 5 in)
- Position: Defender

Senior career*
| Years | Team | Apps | (Gls) |
| 1963–1976 | TP Mazembe | | |

International career
| 1968–1976 | Congo-Kinshasa/Zaire | 31 | (0) |
Medal record
Men's Football
Representing Congo-Kinshasa
Africa Cup of Nations
| Winner | 1968 Ethiopia |
- * Club domestic league appearances and goals

Albert Mwanza Mukombo (17 December 1945 – 13 October 2001) was a Congolese footballer who played for Zaire in the 1974 FIFA World Cup. He also played for TP Mazembe.

He is well known among Argentine sticker collectors due to his sticker for the 1974 World Cup Album by FKS (not Panini) being near-impossible to collect due to its rarity.

== Honours ==
Congo-Kinshasa

- African Cup of Nations: 1968
