= Blagoje Vidinić =

Macedonian footballer

Personal information
- Full name: Blagoje Vidinić
- Date of birth: 11 June 1934
- Place of birth: Skopje, Kingdom of Yugoslavia
- Date of death: 29 December 2006 (aged 72)
- Place of death: Strasbourg, France
- Height: 1.98 m (6 ft 6 in)
- Position: Goalkeeper

Youth career
- Vardar

Senior career*
Years	Team	Apps	(Gls)
1951–1955	Vardar	144	(0)
1955–1961	Radnički Beograd	123	(0)
1962–1964	OFK Beograd	33	(0)
1964–1966	FC Sion	52	(0)
1967	Los Angeles Toros	20	(0)
1968	San Diego Toros	4	(0)
1968	St. Louis Stars	23	(0)
Total		338	(0)

International career
1956–1960	Yugoslavia	8	(0)

Managerial career
- 1970–1971: Morocco
- 1971–1972: FAR Rabat
- 1971–1974: Zaire
- 1976–1979: Colombia
Medal record
Men's Football
Representing Yugoslavia (as player)
Olympic Games
Silver medal – second place	1956 Melbourne	Team
Gold medal – first place	1960 Rome	Team
European Championship
Silver medal – second place	1960 France	Team
Representing Zaire (as manager)
Africa Cup of Nations
Winner	1974 Egypt
- * Club domestic league appearances and goals

Blagoje Vidinić (Macedonian: Благоја Видиниќ, Serbian: Благоје Видинић; 11 June 1934 – 29 December 2006) was a professional football coach, player, and Olympic participant.

Born in present-day North Macedonia to a Serb family, he represented Yugoslavia internationally. He also managed the national football teams of Morocco, Zaire, and Colombia.

== Playing career ==
=== Club ===
Born in Skopje, he played his club football for FK Vardar, Radnički Beograd and OFK Beograd in Yugoslavia, and then with FC Sion of Switzerland. In 1967, he moved to the US to join the Los Angeles Toros of the National Professional Soccer League, making 20 appearances that season. He started the 1968 season with the relocated successor team San Diego Toros in the newly formed NASL, before moving to St. Louis Stars.

=== International ===
He played for Yugoslavia as a goalkeeper in the 1956 and 1960 Olympics, winning silver in the former and gold in the latter. He also played in the 1960 UEFA European Football Championship when Yugoslavia finished second. He earned 8 caps and his final international was an October 1960 friendly match against Hungary.

== Managerial career ==
After retiring from playing, he became a coach, and managed two African teams in the FIFA World Cup: Morocco in 1970 and Zaire in 1974.

== Honours ==
=== Player ===
FC Sion

- Swiss Cup: 1964–65

Yugoslavia

- Olympic Gold Medal: 1960

=== Manager ===
FAR Rabat

- Moroccan Throne Cup: 1971

Zaire

- African Cup of Nations: 1974
