= Kazadi Mwamba =

DR Congolese footballer (1947–1996)

Personal information
- Full name: Robert Kazadi Mwamba
- Date of birth: 6 March 1947
- Place of birth: Élisabethville, Belgian Congo
- Date of death: 1998
- Height: 1.75 m (5 ft 9 in)
- Position: Goalkeeper

Senior career*
Years	Team	Apps	(Gls)
1966–1985	TP Mazembe		

International career
1968–1980	Congo-Kinshasa/Zaire	40	(0)
Medal record
Men's Football
Representing Congo-Kinshasa
Africa Cup of Nations
Winner	1968 Ethiopia
Men's Football
Representing Zaire
Africa Cup of Nations
Winner	1974 Egypt
- * Club domestic league appearances and goals

Robert Kazadi Mwamba (6 March 1947 – 1998) was a goalkeeper who played for TP Mazembe and Zaire.

== Career ==
Mwamba played for DR Congo giants TP Mazembe and the Zaire national team (now DR Congo).

He was named the Player of the Tournament when Congo won the 1968 African Cup of Nations and followed this up with another victory in the 1974 African Cup of Nations where he was named to the Team of the Tournament.

At the 1974 FIFA World Cup, in a group game involving the Leopards and Yugoslavia, Kazadi conceded three goals in the first 20 minutes and was substituted by his Yugoslavian coach, Blagoje Vidinić.

He appeared in two 1982 World Cup qualifying matches; a 5–2 win over Mozambique on 13 July 1980 and a 3–2 win over Madagascar on 21 December 1980.

Kazadi was voted the IFFHS Keeper of the Century for the Democratic Republic of the Congo in 2000.

He was the cousin of fellow footballer Bwanga Tshimen.

== Honours ==
TP Mazembe

- Linafoot: 1967, 1969, 1976
- Congo Cup: 1967, 1979
- African Cup of Champions Clubs: 1967, 1968
- African Cup Winners' Cup: 1980

Congo-Kinshasa

- African Cup of Nations: 1968

Zaire

- African Cup of Nations: 1974

Individual

- Africa Cup of Nations Player of the Tournament: 1968

== See also ==
- 1974 FIFA World Cup squads
