= Mwepu Ilunga =

DR Congolese footballer (1949–2015)

Personal information
- Full name: Joseph Mwepu Ilunga
- Date of birth: 22 August 1949
- Place of birth: Belgian Congo
- Date of death: 8 May 2015 (aged 65)
- Place of death: Kinshasa, DR Congo
- Position: Defender

Senior career*
Years	Team	Apps	(Gls)
- TP Mazembe

International career
1971–1975	Zaïre	21	(0)
Medal record
Men's Football
Representing Zaire
Africa Cup of Nations
Winner	1974 Egypt
- * Club domestic league appearances and goals

Joseph Mwepu Ilunga (22 August 1949 – 8 May 2015) was a football defender from Zaire (now the Democratic Republic of the Congo). His name is also written as Alunga Mwepu.

== Club career ==
Mwepu played club football for Englebert TP Mazembe in his native Zaire, with whom he won the 1967 African Cup of Champions and 1968 African Cup of Champions.

== International career ==
Mwepu played for his country, then called Zaire, during the 1974 FIFA World Cup. Zaire were then the first sub-Saharan African team to qualify for the World Cup finals. During their group match against Brazil, he ran out of his team's defensive wall and kicked away a free kick before the ball was in play. He was subsequently cautioned, but some commentators felt that he seemed oblivious as to what he had done wrong. However, Mwepu claimed that he was quite aware of the rules – as would be expected from an experienced player in a successful side – and was hoping that the referee would send him off. The intended red card would have been a protest against his country's authorities, who were alleged to be depriving the players of their rightful earnings. The 1974 World Cup did not mark the end of Mwepu's international career, as he was included in Zaire's squad at the 1975 Iran International Tournament.

== Death ==
Mwepu Ilunga died in May 2015 after a long illness in the Saint-Joseph de Limete Hospital, Kinshasa.

== Honours ==
Zaire

- African Cup of Nations: 1974
