= Brighton Sinyangwe =

Zambian footballer

Personal information
- Place of birth: Zambia
- Position: Forward

Senior career*
Years	Team	Apps	(Gls)
- Mindola United
- Rhokana United

International career
1972–1978	Zambia	20	(4)
- * Club domestic league appearances and goals

Brighton Sinyangwe was a Zambian footballer who plays as a forward. He played for Zambia in the Africa Cup of Nations in 1974 and 1978.

He played club football for Mindola United and Rhokana United.
