= Kidumu Mantantu =

Congolese football midfielder

Personal information
- Full name: Raoul Albert Kidumu Mantantu
- Date of birth: 17 November 1946 (age 79)
- Place of birth: Mbanza-Ngungu, Belgian Congo
- Position: Midfielder

Senior career*
Years	Team	Apps	(Gls)
- Diables Rouges de Thysville
- SC Imana

International career
- Zaire
Medal record
Men's Football
Representing Congo-Kinshasa
Africa Cup of Nations
Winner	1968 Ethiopia
Men's Football
Representing Zaire
Africa Cup of Nations
Winner	1974 Egypt
- * Club domestic league appearances and goals

Raoul Albert Kidumu Mantantu (born 17 November 1946) is a former Congolese football midfielder who played for Zaire in the 1974 FIFA World Cup. He played for Diables Rouges de Thysville and SC Imana.

On 14 June 1976, Mantantu would become the first African player to receive a yellow card at the FIFA World Cup during his match against Scotland.

== Honours ==
Congo-Kinshasa

- African Cup of Nations: 1968

Zaire

- African Cup of Nations: 1974
