= Ndaye Mulamba =

DR Congolese footballer (1948–2019)

Personal information
- Full name: Pierre Ndaye Mulamba
- Date of birth: 4 November 1948
- Place of birth: Luluabourg, Belgian Congo
- Date of death: 26 January 2019 (aged 70)
- Place of death: Johannesburg, South Africa
- Position: Forward

Youth career
- 1962–1964: Renaissance du Kasaï

Senior career*
Years	Team	Apps	(Gls)
1964–1971	Renaissance du Kasaï		
1971–1972	AS Bantous		
1972–1988	AS Vita Club	224	(116)

International career
1967–1976	Congo-Kinshasa/Zaire	20	(10)
Medal record
Representing Zaire
Men's football
Africa Cup of Nations
Winner	1974 Egypt
- * Club domestic league appearances and goals

Pierre Ndaye Mulamba (4 November 1948 – 26 January 2019) was a footballer from the Democratic Republic of the Congo, formerly Zaire, who played as a forward. He was nicknamed "Mutumbula" ("assassin") and "Volvo".

== Football career ==
Mulamba was born in Luluabourg (now Kananga) in 1948. In 1973, he starred for AS Vita Club of Kinshasa, who won the African Cup of Champions Clubs. He was a second-half substitute for the Zaire national team against Morocco in the decisive match in qualification for the 1974 World Cup. In 1974 Mulamba played for Zaire in both the African Cup of Nations in Egypt and the FIFA World Cup in West Germany. In Egypt he scored nine goals, still a record, as Zaire won the tournament. Mulamba was named Player of the Tournament and was awarded the National Order of the Leopard by President Mobutu Sese Seko. In Germany, he captained the team, and played in the 2–0 defeat by Scotland, but was sent off after 22 minutes against Yugoslavia. Zaire were already losing 4–0 by then, and finally lost 9–0. Mulamba said later that the team had underperformed, either in protest or from loss of morale, after not receiving a promised $45,000 match bonus.

== Later life ==
In 1994, Mulamba was honoured at the 1994 African Cup of Nations in Tunisia. On returning to Zaire, he was shot in the leg by robbers who mistakenly assumed a former sports star would be a wealthy target. He was sheltered by Emmanuel Paye-Paye for eight months' recuperation. During the First Congo War, Mulamba's eldest son was killed and in 1996 he fled to South Africa as a refugee, alone and destitute. He went to Johannesburg and then Cape Town, where he was taken in by a family in a township. In 1998, a minute's silence was held at the African Cup of Nations in Burkina Faso after an erroneous report that Mulamba had died in a diamond mining accident in Angola. By then Mulamba was unemployed and drinking heavily.

By 2010 Mulamba was working as a coach of local amateur teams and had married a local woman. Forgotten Gold, a documentary filmed in 2008–09, follows him in South Africa and on a visit back to Congo. He also met with Danny Jordaan, head of the organising committee for the 2010 FIFA World Cup.

Mulamba suffered from heart, kidney and knee problems in later life and was a wheelchair user. He lived in poverty and without recognition in the Khayelitsha township of Cape Town. He died in Johannesburg on 26 January 2019.

== Honours ==
AS Vita Club

- African Cup of Champions Clubs: 1973
- Zaire / DR Congo League (6): 1972, 1973, 1975, 1977, 1980, 1988
- Congo Cup (7): 1972, 1973, 1975, 1977, 1981, 1982, 1983

Zaire

- African Cup of Nations: 1974
