= Mayanga Maku =

Congolese footballer (born 1948)

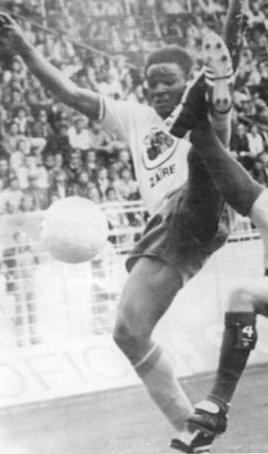
- Maku in 1974

Personal information
- Full name: Jean Adelard Mayanga Maku
- Date of birth: 31 October 1948 (age 78)
- Place of birth: Léopoldville, Belgian Congo
- Position: Forward

Senior career*
| Years | Team | Apps | (Gls) |
- AS Vita Club

International career
| 1967–1974 | Congo-Kinshasa/Zaire | 23 | (8) |
Medal record
Men's Football
Representing Zaire
Africa Cup of Nations
| Winner | 1974 Egypt |
- * Club domestic league appearances and goals

Jean Adelard Mayanga Maku (born 31 October 1948) is a Congolese former footballer who played as a forward for Zaire in the 1974 FIFA World Cup. He also played for AS Vita Club.

== Career ==
Mayanga scored three goals for Zaire at the 1972 African Cup of Nations finals. He represented Zaire in international competition as late as 1979, appearing in a 1980 African Cup of Nations qualifying match versus Guinea in Kinshasa.

In 2006, he was selected by CAF as one of the best 200 African football players of the last 50 years.

== Honours ==
Zaire

- African Cup of Nations: 1974
