= Kakoko Etepé =

Congolese footballer (born 1950)

Personal information
- Full name: Emmanuel Kakoko Etepé
- Date of birth: 22 November 1950 (age 75)
- Place of birth: Léopoldville, Belgian Congo
- Height: 1.75 m (5 ft 9 in)
- Position: Forward

Senior career*
Years	Team	Apps	(Gls)
1968–1981	Imana Kinshasa		
1981–1982	VfB Stuttgart	1	(0)
1982–1984	1. FC Saarbrücken	49	(23)
1984–1985	Borussia Neunkirchen	0	(0)

International career
1970–1976	Congo-Kinshasa/Zaire	31	(9)
Medal record
Men's Football
Representing Zaire
Africa Cup of Nations
Winner	1974 Egypt
- * Club domestic league appearances and goals

Emmanuel Kakoko Etepé (born 22 November 1950) is a Congolese former professional footballer who played as a forward. He represented Zaire in the 1974 FIFA World Cup.

== Career ==
Kakoko played for Imana Kinshasa, VfB Stuttgart (1981–82) and 1. FC Saarbrücken. Kakoko finished fourth in the voting for France Football's 1973 African Player of the Year. In 2006, he was selected by CAF as one of the best 200 African football players of the last 50 years.

== Personal life ==
Some time after his World Cup stint, Kakoko settled in West Germany and worked at a Mercedes factory in Stuttgart. His son Yannick is also a footballer and currently manages FC Differdange 03 in Luxembourg.

== Honours ==
Zaire

- African Cup of Nations: 1974

== See also ==
- 1974 FIFA World Cup squads
