= 1974 African Cup of Nations =

9th edition of the Africa Cup of Nations

1974 كأس أمم أفريقيا

Tournament details
- Host country: Egypt
- Dates: 1–14 March
- Teams: 8
- Venues: 4 (in 4 host cities)

Final positions
- Champions: Zaire (2nd title)
- Runners-up: Zambia
- Third place: Egypt
- Fourth place: Congo

Tournament statistics
- Matches played: 17
- Goals scored: 54 (3.18 per match)
- Top scorer(s): (Zaire) Ndaye Mulamba (9 goals)
- Best player: (Egypt) Hassan Shehata

The 1974 African Cup of Nations was the ninth edition of the African Cup of Nations, the international football championship run by the Confederation of African Football (CAF). It was hosted by Egypt. Just like in 1972, the field of eight teams was split into two groups of four.

Zaire won a second championship (their first title came as Congo-Kinshasa), drawing with Zambia 2−2 in the final before beating them 2−0 in the replay.

Zaire went on to compete in the 1974 FIFA World Cup later that year; the African Cup finalists were also the two best performing teams in African qualification for that year's World Cup.

== Qualified teams ==
The 8 qualified teams are:

Team	Qualified as	Qualified on	Previous appearances in tournament (Note: Bold indicates champion for that year, Italic indicates host.)
Egypt	Hosts		5 (**1957**, **1959**, 1962, 1963, 1970)
Congo	Holders	5 March 1972	2 (1968 **1972**)
Guinea	2nd round winners	14 June 1973	1 (1970)
Mauritius	2nd round winners	14 June 1973	0 (debut)
Uganda	2nd round winners	14 June 1973	2 (1962, 1968)
Zaire	2nd round winners	14 June 1973	4 (1965, **1968**, 1970, 1972)
Zambia	2nd round winners	29 July 1973	0 (debut)
Ivory Coast	2nd round winners	23 September 1973	3 (1965, 1968, 1970)

== Venues ==
Cairo	1974 African Cup of Nations is located in Egypt	Alexandria
Cairo International Stadium	1974 African Cup of Nations is located in Egypt	Alexandria Stadium
Capacity: **95,000**	1974 African Cup of Nations is located in Egypt	Capacity: **13,660**
El-Mahalla El-Kubra	1974 African Cup of Nations is located in Egypt	Damanhour
El Mahalla Stadium	1974 African Cup of Nations is located in Egypt	Ala'ab Damanhour Stadium
Capacity: **29,000**	1974 African Cup of Nations is located in Egypt	Capacity: **8,000**

== Group stage ==
=== Tiebreakers ===
If two or more teams finished level on points after completion of the group matches, the following tie-breakers were used to determine the final ranking:

1. Goal difference in all group matches
2. Greater number of goals scored in all group matches
3. Drawing of lots

=== Group A ===
Pos	Team	Pld	W	D	L	GF	GA	GD	Pts	Qualification
1	Egypt (H)	3	3	0	0	7	2	+5	**6**	Advance to knockout stage
2	Zambia	3	2	0	1	3	3	0	**4**	Advance to knockout stage
3	Uganda	3	0	1	2	3	5	−2	**1 (Note: Tied on head-to-head points. Overall goal difference: Uganda –2, Ivory Coast −3.)**	
4	Ivory Coast	3	0	1	2	2	5	−3	**1**	

Rules for classification: Group stage tiebreakers
(H) Hosts
Notes:
1 March 1974

Egypt	2–1	Uganda
Abo Greisha 6'; Khalil 52'		Mubiru 28'

Cairo International Stadium, Cairo
Referee: Youssouf Ndiaye (Senegal)
2 March 1974

Zambia	1–0	Ivory Coast
Kaushi 2'

El Mahalla Stadium, El-Mahalla El-Kubra
Referee: Abdelkader Aouissi (Algeria)

4 March 1974

Egypt	3–1	Zambia
Abdel Azim 4'; Basri 18'; Abo Greisha 52'		Chitalu 10'

Cairo International Stadium, Cairo
Referee: Sunny Olufemi Woghiren (Nigeria)
4 March 1974

Ivory Coast	2–2	Uganda
Kouman 37', 78'		Mubiru 53', 60'

El Mahalla Stadium, El-Mahalla El-Kubra
Referee: Gebreysus Tesfaye (Ethiopia)

6 March 1974

Egypt	2–0	Ivory Coast
El-Shazly 1'; Khalil 44'

Cairo International Stadium, Cairo
6 March 1974

Zambia	1–0	Uganda
Kapita 60'

El Mahalla Stadium, El-Mahalla El-Kubra

=== Group B ===
Pos	Team	Pld	W	D	L	GF	GA	GD	Pts	Qualification
1	Congo	3	2	1	0	5	2	+3	**5**	Advance to knockout stage
2	Zaire	3	2	0	1	7	4	+3	**4**	Advance to knockout stage
3	Guinea	3	1	1	1	4	4	0	**3**	
4	Mauritius	3	0	0	3	2	8	−6	**0**	

Rules for classification: Group stage tiebreakers
3 March 1974

Zaire	2–1	Guinea
Mulamba 18', 65'		B. Sylla 25'

Ala'ab Damanhour Stadium, Damanhour
Referee: Saad Gamar (Libya)
3 March 1974

Congo	2–0	Mauritius
Moukila 46'; Lakou 47'

Alexandria Stadium, Alexandria

5 March 1974

Guinea	2–1	Mauritius
M. Sylla 52', 64'		Imbert 88'

Ala'ab Damanhour Stadium, Damanhour
Referee: Ahmed Gindil (Sudan)
5 March 1974

Congo	2–1	Zaire
M'Bono 70'; Minga 81'		Mayanga 25'

Alexandria Stadium, Alexandria
Referee: Abdelkrim Benghezal (Algeria)

7 March 1974

Congo	1–1	Guinea
Ndomba 65'		Edenté 60' (pen.)

Alexandria Stadium, Alexandria
7 March 1974

Zaire	4–1	Mauritius
Mulamba 15'; Mayanga 19', 76'; Etepé 38'		Imbert 61'

Ala'ab Damanhour Stadium, Damanhour
Referee: Wallace Johnson (Sierra Leone)

== Knockout stage ==
=== Bracket ===
Semi-finals
9 March – Cairo
Egypt	2
**Zaire**	**3**
9 March – Alexandria
Congo	2
**Zambia (a.e.t.)**	**4**

Final
12 & 14 March – Cairo
**Zaire (replay)**	**2 (2)**
Zambia	2 (0)
Third place
11 March – Cairo
**Egypt**	**4**
Congo	0

=== Semi-finals ===
9 March 1974

Egypt	2–3	Zaire
Mwepu 41' (o.g.); Abo Greisha 54'		Mulamba 55', 72'; Mantantu 61'

Cairo International Stadium, Cairo
Referee: Abdelkader Aouissi (Algeria)

9 March 1974

Congo	2–4 (a.e.t.)	Zambia
M'Pelé 76'; Mbouta 81'		Mapulanga 49'; Chanda 70', 97', 111'

Alexandria Stadium, Alexandria
Referee: Gratian Matovu (Tanzania)

=== Third place match ===
11 March 1974

Congo	0–4	Egypt
		Abdou 5'; Shehata 18', 80'; Abo Greisha 62'

Cairo International Stadium, Cairo
Referee: Gebreysus Tesfaye (Ethiopia)

=== Final ===
12 March 1974

Zaire	2–2 (a.e.t.)	Zambia
Mulamba 65', 117'		Kaushi 40'; Sinyangwe 120'

Cairo International Stadium, Cairo
Attendance: 55,000
Referee: Saad Gamar (Libya)

Replay

14 March 1974

Zaire	2–0	Zambia
Mulamba 30', 76'

Cairo International Stadium, Cairo
Attendance: 1,000
Referee: Saad Gamar (Libya)

== Goalscorers ==
There were 54 goals scored in 17 matches, for an average of 3.18 goals per match.

9 goals

- (Zaire) Ndaye Mulamba

4 goals

- (Egypt) Ali Abo Greisha

3 goals

- (Uganda) Stanley Mubiru
- (Zaire) Mayanga Maku
- (Zambia) Bernard Chanda

2 goals

- (Republic of the Congo) Jean-Jacques N'Domba
- (Egypt) Ali Khalil
- (Zambia) Simon Kaushi
- (Egypt) Hassan Shehata
- (Guinea) Morciré Sylla
- (Ivory Coast) Kobinan Kouman
- (Mauritius) Daniel Imbert

1 goal

- (Republic of the Congo) Sebastien Lakou
- (Republic of the Congo) Jean-Michel M'Bono
- (Republic of the Congo) Noël Minga
- (Republic of the Congo) Paul Moukila
- (Republic of the Congo) François M'Pelé
- (Egypt) Gamal Abdel Azim
- (Egypt) Hassan El-Shazly
- (Egypt) Moustafa Abdou
- (Egypt) Taha Basry
- (Guinea) Bengally Sylla
- (Zaire) Kakoko Etepé
- (Zambia) Joseph Mapulanga
- (Guinea) Edenté
- (Zaire) Kidumu Mantantu
- (Zambia) Godfrey Chitalu
- (Zambia) Obby Kapita
- (Zambia) Brighton Sinyangwe

1 own goal

- (Zaire) Ilunga Mwepu (against Egypt)

== Team of the Tournament ==
Goalkeeper

- (Zaire) Kazadi Mwamba

Defenders

- (Republic of the Congo) Gabriel Dengaki
- (Zambia) Dick Chama
- (Zaire) Lobilo Boba
- (Egypt) Hany Moustafa

Midfielders

- (Zaire) Ndaye Mulamba
- (Egypt) Farouk Gaafar
- (Egypt) Hassan Shehata
- (Zaire) Mayanga Maku

Forwards

- (Zaire) Kakoko Etepé
- (Egypt) Ali Abo Greisha
