= 1973 African Cup of Champions Clubs final =

- Event: 1973 African Cup of Champions Clubs
Asante Kotoko	AS Vita Club
(Ghana)	(Zaire)
4	5
- Vita Club won 5 – 3 on aggregate

First leg
Asante Kotoko	AS Vita Club
4	2
- Date: 25 November 1973
- Venue: Kumasi Stadium, Kumasi
- Weather: 38°C

Second leg
AS Vita Club	Asante Kotoko
3	0
- Date: 16 December 1973
- Venue: 20 May Stadium, Kinshasa

The 1973 African Cup of Champions Clubs final was the final of the 1973 African Cup of Champions Clubs.

It was a football tie held over two legs in November 1973 and December 1973 between Asante Kotoko of Ghana, and AS Vita Club of Zaïre.

Vita Club won the final with aggregate 5–4, became the 2nd Zaïrian club to win the cup. · ·

== Teams ==
In the following table, finals until 1996 were in the African Cup of Champions Club era, since 1997 were in the CAF Champions League era.

Team	Previous finals appearances (bold indicates winners)
(Ghana) Asante Kotoko	3 (1967,**1970**, 1971)
(Egypt) Al Ahly	

== Venues ==
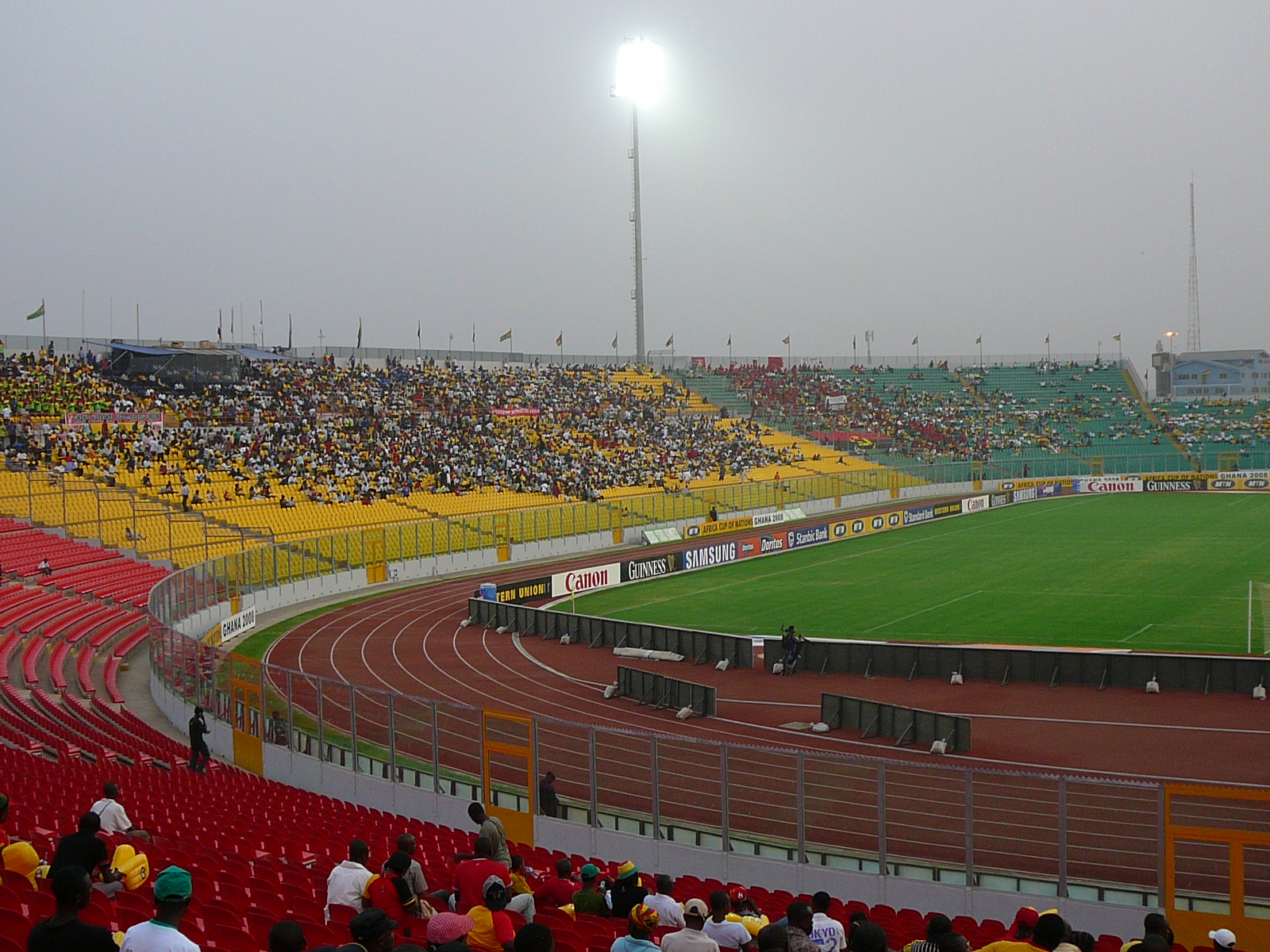
Kumasi Stadium in Kumasi, Ghana, hosted the first leg.

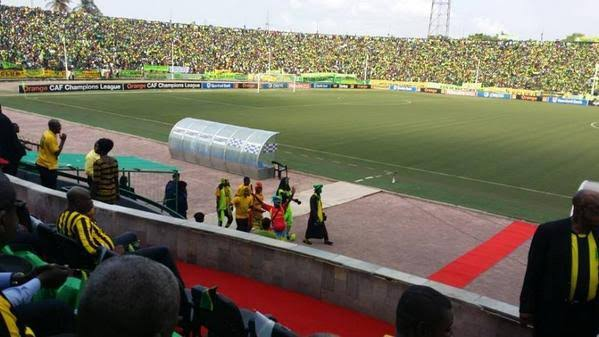
20 may Stadium in Kinshasa, Zaïre, hosted the second leg.

== Road to the final ==
Note: In all results below, the score of the finalist is given first (H: home; A: away).

(Ghana) Asante Kotoko				Round	(Zaire) AS Vita Club			
Opponent	Agg	1st leg	2nd leg	Qualifying rounds	Opponent	Agg	1st leg	2nd leg
Bye				First round	Bye			
(Sudan) Al Merrikh	4–1	1–1 (A)	3–0 (H)	Second round	(Nigeria) Mighty Jets	w/o^{1}	— (A)	— (H)
Opponent	Agg	1st leg	2nd leg	Knockout stage	Opponent	Agg	1st leg	2nd leg
(Zambia) Kabwe Warriors	3–2	1–2 (A)	2–0 (H)	Quarter-finals	(Mali) Stade Malien	7–1	3–0 (A)	4–1 (H)
Kenya Breweries	4–1	2–0 (A)	2–1 (H)	Semi-finals	(Cameroon) Léopard Douala	4–3	3–0 (H)	1–3 (A)

^{1} Mighty Jets were forced to withdraw as they could not afford the cost of travel to Zaire for the first leg.

== Format ==
The final was played on a home-and-away two-legged basis. If the sides were level on aggregate after the second leg, the away goals rule was applied, and if still level, the tie proceeded directly to a penalty shoot-out (no extra time was played).

== Matches ==
=== First leg ===
25 November 1973
--:-- UTC+0

Asante Kotoko (Ghana)	4–2	(Zaire) AS Vita Club
Jabir 8'; Sam 52', 57'; Acquah 59'		Mayanga 26'; Mavuba 65' (pen.)

Kumasi Stadium, Kumasi
Attendance: 40 000

**Asante Kotoko**	**AS Vita Club**

GK	(Ghana) John Botwe
DF	(Ghana) Dadzie
DF	(Ghana) Dan Oppong
DF	(Ghana) Brenya
DF	(Ghana) Oliver Acquah
MF	(Ghana) Samuel Yaw
MF	(Ghana) Kwame Nti
FW	(Ghana) Joe Sam
FW	(Ghana) Essien	Substituted off
FW	(Ghana) Gordon	Substituted off
FW	(Ghana) Malik Jabir
Substitutes:
GK	(Ghana)
DF	(Ghana)
DF	(Ghana)
MF	(Ghana) Ibrahim Sunday
MF	(Ghana) Lawal	Substituted on
FW	(Ghana) Abukari Gariba
FW	(Ghana) Osei Kofi	Substituted on
Manager:
(Ghana) Boakye

GK
DF
DF
DF
DF
MF
MF
MF
FW
FW
FW
Substitutes:
GK
DF
DF
MF
FW
FW
FW
FW
Manager:
(Zaire) Yvon Kalambayi Ngoie

(Zaire) Louis Pombi
(Zaire) Joseph Lungwila
(Zaire) Nestor Luyeye
(Zaire) Matondo Matudi
(Zaire) Florian Lobilo
(Zaire) Kondi Affa Luvu	Substituted off
(Zaire) Léon Mungamuni
(Zaire) Joseph Kibonge	(c)
(Zaire) Pierre Ndaye
(Zaire) Jean Kembo
(Zaire) Adélard Mayanga
(Zaire) Albert Tubilandu
(Zaire) Musungu wa Musungu
(Zaire) Mambwena
(Zaire) Ngoie
(Zaire) Ricky Mavuba	Substituted on
(Zaire) Nsangu
(Zaire) Gary Ngassebe
(Zaire) Jean Kalala

=== Second leg ===
16 December 1973
--:-- UTC+1

AS Vita Club (Zaire)	3–0	(Ghana) Asante Kotoko
Mayanga 55', 77'; Kembo ?'

20 May Stadium, Kinshasa
Referee: Matuvo (Tanzania)

**AS Vita Club**	**Asante Kotoko**

GK
DF
DF
DF
DF
MF
MF
MF
FW
FW
FW
Substitutes:
GK
DF
DF
MF
FW
FW
FW
FW
Manager:
(Zaire) Yvon Kalambayi Ngoie

(Zaire) Albert Tubilandu
(Zaire) Joseph Lungwila
(Zaire) Nestor Luyeye
(Zaire) Musungu wa Musungu
(Zaire) Florian Lobilo
(Zaire) Kondi Affa Luvu
(Zaire) Ricky Mavuba
(Zaire) Joseph Kibonge	(c)
(Zaire) Pierre Ndaye	Substituted off
(Zaire) Jean Kembo
(Zaire) Adélard Mayanga
(Zaire) Louis Pmbi
(Zaire) Matondo Matudi
(Zaire) Mambwena
(Zaire) Ngoie
(Zaire) Léon Mungamuni
(Zaire) Nsangu
(Zaire) Gary Ngassebe	Substituted on
(Zaire) Jean Kalala

GK	(Ghana) John Botwe
DF	(Ghana) Dadzie
DF	(Ghana) Dan Oppong
DF	(Ghana) Brenya
DF	(Ghana) Oliver Acquah
MF	(Ghana) Samuel Yaw
MF	(Ghana) Kwame Nti
MF	(Ghana) Essien
FW	(Ghana) Joe Sam
FW	(Ghana) Gordon	Substituted off
FW	(Ghana) Malik Jabir
Substitutes:
GK	(Ghana)
DF	(Ghana)
DF	(Ghana)
MF	(Ghana) Ibrahim Sunday
MF	(Ghana) Lawal
FW	(Ghana) Abukari Gariba
FW	(Ghana) Osei Kofi	Substituted on
Manager:
(Ghana) Boakye
