= Ivory Coast at the Africa Cup of Nations =

Ivory Coast is one of Africa's major forces in the Africa Cup of Nations. Ivory Coast has won the tournament three times, most recently as hosts in 2023. They previously won in 1992 and 2015. Ivory Coast has also finished as runner up twice, in 2006 and 2012.

== Overall record ==
Africa Cup of Nations record
Year	Round	Position	Pld	W	D*	L	GF	GA
(Sudan) 1957	Part of France							
(United Arab Republic) 1959	Part of France							
(Ethiopia) 1962	Not affiliated to CAF							
(Ghana) 1963	Not affiliated to CAF							
(Tunisia) 1965	Third place	3rd	3	2	0	1	5	4
(Ethiopia) 1968	Third place	3rd	5	3	1	1	9	6
(Sudan) 1970	Fourth place	4th	5	2	1	2	11	9
(Cameroon) 1972	Did not qualify							
(Egypt) 1974	Group stage	7th	3	0	1	2	2	5
(Ethiopia) 1976	Did not qualify							
(Ghana) 1978	Banned							
(Nigeria) 1980	Group stage	6th	3	0	2	1	2	3
(Libya) 1982	Did not enter							
(Ivory Coast) 1984	Group stage	5th	3	1	0	2	4	4
(Egypt) 1986	Third place	3rd	5	3	0	2	7	5
(Morocco) 1988	Group stage	6th	3	0	3	0	2	2
(Algeria) 1990	Group stage	6th	3	1	0	2	3	5
(Senegal) 1992	Champions	1st	5	2	3	0	4	0
(Tunisia) 1994	Third place	3rd	5	3	1	1	11	5
(South Africa) 1996	Group stage	11th	3	1	0	2	2	5
(Burkina Faso) 1998	Quarter-finals	5th	4	2	2	0	10	6
(Ghana) (Nigeria) 2000	Group stage	9th	3	1	1	1	3	4
(Mali) 2002	Group stage	16th	3	0	1	2	1	4
(Tunisia) 2004	Did not qualify							
(Egypt) 2006	Runners-up	2nd	6	3	2	1	6	5
(Ghana) 2008	Fourth place	4th	6	4	0	2	16	9
(Angola) 2010	Quarter-finals	8th	3	1	1	1	5	4
(Gabon) (Equatorial Guinea) 2012	Runners-up	2nd	6	5	1	0	9	0
(South Africa) 2013	Quarter-finals	5th	4	2	1	1	8	5
(Equatorial Guinea) 2015	Champions	1st	6	3	3	0	9	4
(Gabon) 2017	Group stage	11th	3	0	2	1	2	3
(Egypt) 2019	Quarter-finals	5th	5	3	1	1	7	3
(Cameroon) 2021	Round of 16	10th	4	2	2	0	6	3
(Ivory Coast) 2023	Champions	1st	7	4	1	2	8	8
(Morocco) 2025	Qualified							
(Kenya) (Tanzania) (Uganda) 2027	To be determined							
Total	3 Titles	26/35	106	48	30	28	152	111

*Denotes draws include knockout matches decided via penalty shoot-out.
**Gold background colour indicates that the tournament was won.
***Red border colour indicates tournament was held on home soil.

== Participation history ==
=== Côte d'Ivoire at the 1965 African Cup of Nations ===
Group B

Team	Pld	W	D	L	GF	GA	GD	Pts
Ghana	2	2	0	0	9	3	+6	4
Ivory Coast	2	1	0	1	4	4	0	2
Congo-Léopoldville	2	0	0	2	2	8	−6	0

12 November 1965

Ghana	5–2	Congo-Léopoldville
Kofi 13'; Acheampong 18', 59'; Attuquayefio 84', 89'		Kalala Mukendi 43', 45' (pen.)

Stade Bou Ali Lahouar, Sousse

14 November 1965

Ivory Coast	3–0	Congo-Léopoldville
Manglé 14', 59', 80'

Stade Taïeb Mhiri, Sfax

19 November 1965

Ghana	4–1	Ivory Coast
Acheampong 20'; Nti 43'; Lutterodt 52'; Kofi 70'		Bléziri 66'

Stade Ahmed Bsiri, Bizerte

Third place match

21 November 1965

Senegal	0–1	Ivory Coast
		Yoboué 35'

Stade Chedli Zouiten, Tunis
Referee: Mohamed Mezahi (Algeria)

=== Côte d'Ivoire at the 1968 African Cup of Nations ===
Group A

Team	Pld	W	D	L	GF	GA	GD	Pts
Ethiopia	3	3	0	0	6	2	+4	6
Ivory Coast	3	2	0	1	5	2	+3	4
Algeria	3	1	0	2	5	6	−1	2
Uganda	3	0	0	3	2	8	−6	0

12 January 1968

Ethiopia	2–1	Uganda
Asmerom; Vassalo (pen.)		Ouma

Hailé Sélassié Stadium, Addis Ababa
Attendance: 20,000
Referee: Kandil (Egypt)
12 January 1968

Ivory Coast	3–0	Algeria
Bozon 15'; Pokou 25', 65'

Hailé Sélassié Stadium, Addis Ababa
Attendance: 20,000
Referee: Guèye (Senegal)

14 January 1968

Ethiopia	1–0	Ivory Coast
Bekuretsion 86'

Hailé Sélassié Stadium, Addis Ababa
Attendance: 25,000
Referee: Saleh (Sudan)
14 January 1968

Algeria	4–0	Uganda
Lalmas 15', 25', 70'; Khalem 60'

Hailé Sélassié Stadium, Addis Ababa
Attendance: 25,000
Referee: Mahombé (Congo-Kinshasa)

16 January 1968

Ivory Coast	2–1	Uganda
Pokou; Manglé		Obua

Hailé Sélassié Stadium, Addis Ababa
Attendance: 15,000
Referee: Lamptey (Ghana)
16 January 1968

Ethiopia	3–1	Algeria
Worku 16'; Shewangizaw 19'; Vassalo 27' (pen.)		Amirouche 68'

Hailé Sélassié Stadium, Addis Ababa
Attendance: 20,000
Referee: Angaud (Congo-Brazzaville)

Semi-final

19 January 1968

Ghana	4–3	Ivory Coast
Mfum; Sunday; Odoi	Report	Pokou; Konan (pen.)

Cicero Stadium, Asmara
Attendance: 5,000
Referee: El Attar (Egypt)

Third place match

21 January 1968

Ivory Coast	1–0	Ethiopia
Pokou 28'

Hailé Sélassié Stadium, Addis Ababa
Attendance: 10,000
Referee: Khelifi (Algeria)

=== Côte d'Ivoire at the 1970 African Cup of Nations ===
Group A

Team	Pld	W	D	L	GF	GA	GD	Pts
Ivory Coast	3	2	0	1	9	4	+5	4
Sudan	3	2	0	1	5	2	+3	4
Cameroon	3	2	0	1	7	6	+1	4
Ethiopia	3	0	0	3	3	12	−9	0

6 February 1970

Cameroon	3–2	Ivory Coast
Koum 57', 66'; N'Doga 60'		Pokou 25', 45'

Municipal Stadium, Khartoum
Attendance: 14,464
Referee: Mahmoud (Egypt)
6 February 1970

Sudan	3–0	Ethiopia
Gagarin 43'; Hasabu El-Sagheer 47'; Jaksa 85'

Municipal Stadium, Khartoum
Attendance: 14,464
Referee: Faber (Guinea)

8 February 1970

Cameroon	3–2	Ethiopia
Tsébo 21'; Manga-Onguéné 43'; N'Doga 70'		Mengistu 12', 75'

Municipal Stadium, Khartoum
Attendance: 9,864
Referee: Quarshie (Ghana)
8 February 1970

Ivory Coast	1–0	Sudan
Tahi 89'

Municipal Stadium, Khartoum
Attendance: 9,864
Referee: Mahombé (Congo-Kinshasa)

10 February 1970

Ivory Coast	6–1	Ethiopia
Losseni 16'; Pokou 21', 60', 71', 80', 87'		Mengistu 33'

Municipal Stadium, Khartoum
Attendance: 9,770
Referee: Boukili (Morocco)
10 February 1970

Sudan	2–1	Cameroon
Jaksa 20'; Hasabu El-Sagheer 60'		Tsébo 34'

Municipal Stadium, Khartoum
Attendance: 9,770
Referee: Ngom (Senegal)

Semifinal

14 February 1970

Ivory Coast	1–2 (a.e.t.)	Ghana
Losseni 78'		Sunday 21'; Jabir 100'

Municipal Stadium, Khartoum
Attendance: 12,350

Third place match

16 February 1970

United Arab Rep.	3–1	Ivory Coast
El-Shazly 3', 14', 50'		Pokou 72'

Municipal Stadium, Khartoum
Attendance: 12,187
Referee: Salih Mohamed Boukkili (Morocco)

=== Côte d'Ivoire at the 1974 African Cup of Nations ===
Group A

Team	Pld	W	D	L	GF	GA	GD	Pts
Egypt	3	3	0	0	7	2	+5	6
Zambia	3	2	0	1	3	3	0	4
Uganda	3	0	1	2	3	5	−2	1
Ivory Coast	3	0	1	2	2	5	−3	1

1 March 1974

Egypt	2–1	Uganda
Abo Greisha 6'; Khalil 52'		Mubiru 28'

Cairo International Stadium, Cairo
Referee: Youssouf Ndiaye (Senegal)
2 March 1974

Zambia	1–0	Ivory Coast
Kaushi 2'

El Mahalla Stadium, El-Mahalla El-Kubra
Referee: Abdelkader Aouissi (Algeria)

4 March 1974

Egypt	3–1	Zambia
Abdel Azim 4'; Basri 18'; Abo Greisha 52'		Chitalu 10'

Cairo International Stadium, Cairo
Referee: Sunny Olufemi Woghiren (Nigeria)
4 March 1974

Ivory Coast	2–2	Uganda
Kouman 37', 78'		Mubiru 53', 60'

El Mahalla Stadium, El-Mahalla El-Kubra
Referee: Gebreysus Tesfaye (Ethiopia)

6 March 1974

Egypt	2–0	Ivory Coast
El-Shazly 1'; Khalil 44'

Cairo International Stadium, Cairo
6 March 1974

Zambia	1–0	Uganda
Kapita 60'

El Mahalla Stadium, El-Mahalla El-Kubra

=== Côte d'Ivoire at the 1980 African Cup of Nations ===
Group A

Team	Pld	W	D	L	GF	GA	GD	Pts
Nigeria	3	2	1	0	4	1	+3	5
Egypt	3	2	0	1	4	3	+1	4
Ivory Coast	3	0	2	1	2	3	−1	2
Tanzania	3	0	1	2	3	6	−3	1

8 March 1980

Nigeria	3–1	Tanzania
Lawal 11'; Onyedika 35'; Odegbami 85'	Report	Mkambi 54'

Surulere Stadium, Lagos
Attendance: 80,000
Referee: Suleiman El Naim (Sudan)
8 March 1980

Egypt	2–1	Ivory Coast
Hammam 8'; Mokhtar 20'	Report	Gome 7'

Surulere Stadium, Lagos
Attendance: 80,000
Referee: Joel Mondoka (Zambia)

12 March 1980

Egypt	2–1	Tanzania
Shehata 32'; Nour 38'	Report	Waziri 86'

Surulere Stadium, Lagos
Attendance: 55,000
Referee: Sohan Ramlochun (Mauritius)
12 March 1980

Nigeria	0–0	Ivory Coast
	Report

Surulere Stadium, Lagos
Attendance: 55,000
Referee: Théophile Lawson-Hétchéli (Togo)

15 March 1980

Ivory Coast	1–1	Tanzania
Koma 7'	Report	Waziri 59'

Surulere Stadium, Lagos
Attendance: 70,000
Referee: Diallo Bakaï (Cameroon)
15 March 1980

Nigeria	1–0	Egypt
Isima 15'	Report

Surulere Stadium, Lagos
Attendance: 70,000
Referee: Tesfaye Gebreyesus (Ethiopia)

=== Côte d'Ivoire at the 1984 African Cup of Nations ===
Group A

Team	Pld	W	D	L	GF	GA	GD	Pts
Egypt	3	2	1	0	3	1	+2	5
Cameroon	3	2	0	1	6	2	+4	4
Ivory Coast	3	1	0	2	4	4	0	2
Togo	3	0	1	2	1	7	−6	1

4 March 1984

Ivory Coast	3–0	Togo
Koffi 27'; Fofana 62'; Goba 75'	Report

Stade Félix Houphouët-Boigny, Abidjan
Attendance: 50,000
Referee: Ali Bennaceur (Tunisia)

4 March 1984

Egypt	1–0	Cameroon
Abouzaid 78'	Report

Stade Félix Houphouët-Boigny, Abidjan
Attendance: 50,000
Referee: Gebreyesus Tesfaye (Ethiopia)

7 March 1984

Cameroon	4–1	Togo
Djonkep 7'; Abega 21', 61'; Aoudou 45'	Report	Moutairou 56'

Stade Félix Houphouët-Boigny, Abidjan
Attendance: 15,000
Referee: Mulenga Rezzin (Zambia)

7 March 1984

Ivory Coast	1–2	Egypt
Miézan 53'	Report	Abouzaid 66', 72'

Stade Félix Houphouët-Boigny, Abidjan
Attendance: 40,000
Referee: Edwin Picon-Ackong (Mauritius)

10 March 1984

Egypt	0–0	Togo
	Report

Stade Félix Houphouët-Boigny, Abidjan
Attendance: 40,000
Referee: Frank Valdemarca (Zimbabwe)

10 March 1984

Ivory Coast	0–2	Cameroon
	Report	Milla 42'; Djonkep 61'

Stade Félix Houphouët-Boigny, Abidjan
Attendance: 40,000
Referee: Mohamed Larache (Morocco)

=== Côte d'Ivoire at the 1986 African Cup of Nations ===
Group A

Team	Pld	W	D	L	GF	GA	GD	Pts
Egypt	3	2	0	1	4	1	+3	4
Ivory Coast	3	2	0	1	4	2	+2	4
Senegal	3	2	0	1	3	1	+2	4
Mozambique	3	0	0	3	0	7	−7	0

7 March 1986

Senegal	1–0	Egypt
Youm 67'	Report

Cairo International Stadium, Cairo
Attendance: 45,000
Referee: Edwin Picon-Ackong (Mauritius)

7 March 1986

Ivory Coast	3–0	Mozambique
A. Traoré 25', 74'; N'Dri 86'	Report

Cairo International Stadium, Cairo
Attendance: 20,000
Referee: Gebreyesus Tesfaye (Ethiopia)

10 March 1986

Senegal	2–0	Mozambique
Fall 28'; Bocandé 83'	Report

Cairo International Stadium, Cairo
Attendance: 30,000
Referee: Festus Okubule (Nigeria)

10 March 1986

Egypt	2–0	Ivory Coast
Gharieb 73'; Abdelhamid 83'	Report

Cairo International Stadium, Cairo
Attendance: 50,000
Referee: Bester Kalombo (Malawi)

13 March 1986

Ivory Coast	1–0	Senegal
A. Traoré 71'	Report

Cairo International Stadium, Cairo
Attendance: 15,000
Referee: Jean-Fidele Diramba (Gabon)

13 March 1986

Egypt	2–0	Mozambique
Abouzaid 13', 15'	Report

Cairo International Stadium, Cairo
Attendance: 55,000
Referee: Ally Hafidhi (Tanzania)

Semifinal

17 March 1986

Cameroon	1–0	Ivory Coast
Milla 46'	Report

Alexandria Stadium, Alexandria
Attendance: 12,000
Referee: Edwin Picon-Ackong (Mauritius)

Third place match

20 March 1986

Ivory Coast	3–2	Morocco
Ben Salah 8'; Kassi-Kouadio 38', 68' (pen.)	Report	Rhiati 44'; Sahil 85'

Cairo International Stadium, Cairo
Attendance: 1,000
Referee: Frank Valdemarca (Zimbabwe)

=== Côte d'Ivoire at the 1988 African Cup of Nations ===
Group A

Team	Pld	W	D	L	GF	GA	GD	Pts
Morocco	3	1	2	0	2	1	+1	4
Algeria	3	1	1	1	2	2	0	3
Ivory Coast	3	0	3	0	2	2	0	3
Zaire	3	0	2	1	2	3	−1	2

13 March 1988

Morocco	1–1	Zaire
Merry 43' (pen.)	Report	Lutonadio 88'

Stade Mohamed V, Casablanca
Attendance: 80,000
Referee: Gebreyesus Tesfaye (Ethiopia)

13 March 1988

Ivory Coast	1–1	Algeria
A. Traoré 48'	Report	Belloumi 16'

Stade Mohamed V, Casablanca
Attendance: 40,000
Referee: Eganaden Cadressen (Mauritius)

16 March 1988

Ivory Coast	1–1	Zaire
A. Traoré 74'	Report	Kabongo 37'

Stade Mohamed V, Casablanca
Attendance: 45,000
Referee: Ali Bennaceur (Tunisia)

16 March 1988

Morocco	1–0	Algeria
El Haddaoui 52'	Report

Stade Mohamed V, Casablanca
Attendance: 78,000
Referee: Idrissa Sarr (Mauritania)

19 March 1988

Algeria	1–0	Zaire
Ferhaoui 36'	Report

Stade Mohamed V, Casablanca
Attendance: 75,000
Referee: Hugues Joseph Mongbo (Benin)

19 March 1988

Morocco	0–0	Ivory Coast
	Report

Stade Mohamed V, Casablanca
Attendance: 80,000
Referee: Ally Hafidhi (Tanzania)

Note: Algeria qualified by drawing of lots.

=== Côte d'Ivoire at the 1990 African Cup of Nations ===
Group A

Team	Pld	W	D	L	GF	GA	GD	Pts
Algeria	3	3	0	0	10	1	+9	6
Nigeria	3	2	0	1	3	5	−2	4
Ivory Coast	3	1	0	2	3	5	−2	2
Egypt	3	0	0	3	1	6	−5	0

2 March 1990

Algeria	5–1	Nigeria
Madjer 36', 58'; Menad 69', 72'; Amani 88'	Report	Okocha 82'

Stade 5 Juillet 1962, Algiers
Attendance: 65,000
Referee: Shizuo Takada (Japan)

2 March 1990

Ivory Coast	3–1	Egypt
A. Traoré 53', 60'; Maguy 73'	Report	Abdelrahman 75'

Stade 5 Juillet 1962, Algiers
Attendance: 7,000
Referee: Ally Hafidhi (Tanzania)

5 March 1990

Nigeria	1–0	Egypt
Yekini 8'	Report

Stade 5 Juillet 1962, Algiers
Attendance: 47,000
Referee: Laurent Petcha (Cameroon)

5 March 1990

Algeria	3–0	Ivory Coast
Menad 23'; Chérif El-Ouazzani 81'; Oudjani 82'	Report

Stade 5 Juillet 1962, Algiers
Attendance: 75,000
Referee: Idrissa Sarr (Mauritania)

8 March 1990

Nigeria	1–0	Ivory Coast
Yekini 3'	Report

Stade 5 Juillet 1962, Algiers
Attendance: 80,000
Referee: Abdellali Naciri (Morocco)

8 March 1990

Algeria	2–0	Egypt
Amani 39'; Saïb 43'	Report

Stade 5 Juillet 1962, Algiers
Attendance: 86,000
Referee: Eganaden Cadressen (Mauritius)

=== Côte d'Ivoire at the 1992 African Cup of Nations ===
Group C

Team	Pld	W	D	L	GF	GA	GD	Pts
Ivory Coast	2	1	1	0	3	0	+3	3
Congo	2	0	2	0	1	1	0	2
Algeria	2	0	1	1	1	4	−3	1

January 13, 1992

Ivory Coast	3–0	Algeria
A. Traoré 14'; Fofana 25'; Tiéhi 89'	Report

Stade Aline Sitoe Diatta, Ziguinchor
Attendance: 5,000
Referee: Mohamed Hounnake-Kouassi (Togo)

January 15, 1992

Ivory Coast	0–0	Congo

Stade Aline Sitoe Diatta, Ziguinchor
Attendance: 5,000
Referee: Rafhidi Ali (Tanzania)

January 17, 1992

Algeria	1–1	Congo
Bouiche 44'	Report	Tchibota 6'

Stade Aline Sitoe Diatta, Ziguinchor
Attendance: 5,000
Referee: Christopher Musaabi (Uganda)

Quarter-final

January 20, 1992

Ivory Coast	1–0 (a.e.t.)	Zambia
Sié 94'

Stade de l'Amitié, Dakar
Attendance: 3,000
Referee: Pierre Mounguegui (Gabon)

Semi-final

January 23, 1992

Cameroon	0–0 (a.e.t.)	Ivory Coast
	Report
Penalties
Makanaky (penalty missed); Ebwelle (penalty scored); Omam-Biyik (penalty missed); Bell (penalty missed)	1–3	(penalty scored) Diaby; (penalty scored) M. Traoré; (penalty missed) Yago; (penalty scored) A. Traoré

Stade de l'Amitié, Dakar
Attendance: 35,000
Referee: Lim Kee Chong (Mauritius)

Final

January 26, 1992

Ivory Coast	0–0 (a.e.t.)	Ghana
	Report
Penalties
Aka (penalty scored); Hobou (penalty scored); Sekana (penalty scored); M. Traoré (penalty scored); Tiéhi (penalty missed); Gadji-Celi (penalty scored); Kouadio (penalty scored); Abouo (penalty scored); Maguy (penalty scored); Sie (penalty scored); Gouamené (penalty scored); Aka (penalty scored)	11–10	(penalty scored) Baffoe; (penalty scored) Lamptey; (penalty scored) Naawu; (penalty missed) Asare; (penalty scored) Yeboah; (penalty scored) Manso; (penalty scored) Armah; (penalty scored) Abroah; (penalty scored) Ampeah; (penalty scored) Opoku; (penalty scored) Ansah; (penalty missed) Baffoe

Stade de l'Amitié, Dakar
Attendance: 47,500
Referee: Badara Sène (Senegal)

The penalty shootout was significant in that it was the first in the final of a major international tournament that every player on the pitch took a penalty.

=== Côte d'Ivoire at the 1994 African Cup of Nations ===
Group C

Team	Pld	W	D	L	GF	GA	GD	Pts
Zambia	2	1	1	0	1	0	+1	3
Ivory Coast	2	1	0	1	4	1	+3	2
Sierra Leone	2	0	1	1	0	4	−4	1

27 March 1994

Ivory Coast	4–0	Sierra Leone
Tiéhi 19', 63', 70'; Guel 35'

Stade Olympique de Sousse, Sousse
Attendance: 10,000
Referee: Jamal Al-Sharif (Syria)

29 March 1994

Zambia	0–0	Sierra Leone

Stade Olympique de Sousse, Sousse
Attendance: 6,000
Referee: Omer Yengo (Congo)

31 March 1994

Zambia	1–0	Ivory Coast
Malitoli 79'

Stade Olympique de Sousse, Sousse
Attendance: 6,000
Referee: Petros Mathabela (South Africa)

Quarterfinal

3 April 1994

Ghana	1–2	Ivory Coast
Akonnor 77'		Tiéhi 30'; A. Traoré 81'

Stade Olympique de Sousse, Sousse
Attendance: 8,000
Referee: Ali Bujsaim (United Arab Emirates)

Semifinal

6 April 1994

Nigeria	2–2 (a.e.t.)	Ivory Coast
Iroha 26'; Yekini 40'	Report	Bassolé 19', 31'
Penalties
Finidi (penalty scored); Siasia (penalty missed); Amokachi (penalty scored); Iroha (penalty scored); Yekini (penalty scored)	4–2	(penalty scored) Kouamé; (penalty scored) Fallet; (penalty missed) Bassolé; (penalty missed) Amani

Stade El Menzah, Tunis
Attendance: 2,000
Referee: Ali Bujsaim (United Arab Emirates)

Third place match

10 April 1994

Ivory Coast	3–1	Mali
Koné 2'; Ouattara 67'; Sie 70'		Diallo 46'

Stade El Menzah, Tunis
Attendance: 15,000
Referee: Petros Mathabela (South Africa)

=== Côte d'Ivoire at the 1996 African Cup of Nations ===
Group D

Team	Pld	W	D	L	GF	GA	GD	Pts
Ghana	3	3	0	0	6	1	+5	9
Tunisia	3	1	1	1	5	4	+1	4
Ivory Coast	3	1	0	2	2	5	−3	3
Mozambique	3	0	1	2	1	4	−3	1

14 January 1996

Ghana	2–0	Ivory Coast
Yeboah 20'; Pelé 70'

EPRU Stadium, Port Elizabeth
Attendance: 8,000
Referee: Masayoshi Okada (Japan)

16 January 1996

Tunisia	1–1	Mozambique
Berkhissa 24'		Bucuane 4'

EPRU Stadium, Port Elizabeth
Attendance: 1,000
Referee: Charles Masembe (Uganda)

19 January 1996

Ghana	2–1	Tunisia
Pelé 50'; Akonnor 77'		Ben Younes 72'

EPRU Stadium, Port Elizabeth
Attendance: 1,000
Referee: Petros Mathabela (South Africa)

21 January 1996

Ivory Coast	1–0	Mozambique
Tiéhi 32'

EPRU Stadium, Port Elizabeth
Attendance: 500
Referee: Gamal Al-Ghandour (Egypt)

25 January 1996

Tunisia	3–1	Ivory Coast
Ben Younes 32', 38'; Ben Hassen 48'		M. Traoré 84'

EPRU Stadium, Port Elizabeth
Attendance: 1,000
Referee: Sidi Bekaye Magassa (Mali)

25 January 1996

Ghana	2–0	Mozambique
Pelé 42'; Aboagye 68'

Free State Stadium, Bloemfontein
Attendance: 3,500
Referee: Ali Bujsaim (United Arab Emirates)

=== Côte d'Ivoire at the 1998 African Cup of Nations ===
Group C

Team	Pld	W	D	L	GF	GA	GD	Pts
Ivory Coast	3	2	1	0	10	6	+4	7
South Africa	3	1	2	0	5	2	+3	5
Angola	3	0	2	1	5	8	−3	2
Namibia	3	0	1	2	7	11	−4	1

8 February 1998
15:00

South Africa	0–0	Angola

Stade Municipal, Bobo-Dioulasso
Attendance: 20,000
Referee: Sidi Bekaye Magassa (Mali)

8 February 1998
18:00

Ivory Coast	4–3	Namibia
Tiéhi 2', 39'; Bakayoko 34'; Diabaté 83'		Shivute 46', 73'; Mannetti 70'

Stade Municipal, Bobo-Dioulasso
Attendance: 20,000
Referee: Karim Dahou (Algeria)

11 February 1998
17:15

Ivory Coast	1–1	South Africa
Ouattara 88'		Mkhalele 8' (pen.)

Stade Municipal, Bobo-Dioulasso
Attendance: 10,000
Referee: Charles Masembe (Uganda)

12 February 1998
18:15

Angola	3–3	Namibia
Lázaro 46'; Paulo Silva 67' (pen.); Miguel Pereira 86'		Uri Khob 20', 51'; Nauseb 33'

Stade Municipal, Bobo-Dioulasso
Attendance: 2,000
Referee: Falla N'Doye (Senegal)

16 February 1998
20:00

Ivory Coast	5–2	Angola
Guel 8', 23'; Tiéhi 43', 81' (pen.); Bakayoko 56'		Paulo Silva 27'; Quinzinho 52'

Stade Municipal, Ouagadougou
Attendance: 4,000
Referee: Maxime Camara (Guinea)

16 February 1998
20:00

South Africa	4–1	Namibia
McCarthy 8', 11', 19', 21'		Uutoni 68'

Stade Municipal, Bobo-Dioulasso
Attendance: 9,500
Referee: Karim Dahou (Algeria)

Quarterfinal

21 February 1998
20:00

Ivory Coast	0–0 (a.e.t.)	Egypt
	Report
Penalties
Domoraud (penalty scored); Guel (penalty scored); Diomandé (penalty missed); Bakayoko (penalty scored); Ouattara (penalty scored)	4–5	(penalty scored) Ramzy; (penalty scored) Radwan; (penalty scored) Kamouna; (penalty scored) Mostafa; (penalty scored) Imam

Stade Municipal, Ouagadougou
Attendance: 20,000
Referee: Ian McLeod (South Africa)

=== Côte d'Ivoire at the 2000 African Cup of Nations ===
Group A

Group A of the 2000 AFCON remains as the only group stage that all four teams to achieve four points out of three matches.

Team	Pld	W	D	L	GF	GA	GD	Pts
Cameroon	3	1	1	1	4	2	+2	4
Ghana	3	1	1	1	3	3	0	4
Ivory Coast	3	1	1	1	3	4	−1	4
Togo	3	1	1	1	2	3	−1	4

22 January 2000
16:00

Ghana	1–1	Cameroon
Ayew 57'		Foé 19'

Accra Sports Stadium, Accra
Attendance: 45,000
Referee: Ali Bujsaim (United Arab Emirates)

24 January 2000
16:00

Ivory Coast	1–1	Togo
Guel 38' (pen.)		Ouadja 19'

Accra Sports Stadium, Accra
Attendance: 13,000
Referee: Tessema Hailemalak (Ethiopia)

27 January 2000
16:00

Ghana	2–0	Togo
Ayew 28'; Addo 37'

Accra Sports Stadium, Accra
Attendance: 30,000
Referee: Abderrahim Al-Arjoune (Morocco)

28 January 2000
19:45

Cameroon	3–0	Ivory Coast
Kalla 29'; Eto'o 45'; M'Boma 90'

Accra Sports Stadium, Accra
Attendance: 5,000
Referee: Mourad Daami (Tunisia)

31 January 2000
16:00

Ghana	0–2	Ivory Coast
		Kalou 45'; Sie 84'

Accra Sports Stadium, Accra
Attendance: 40,000
Referee: Gamal Al-Ghandour (Egypt)

31 January 2000
16:00

Cameroon	0–1	Togo
		Tchangai 18'

Baba Yara Stadium, Kumasi
Attendance: 2,000
Referee: Olufunmi Olaniyan (Nigeria)

=== Côte d'Ivoire at the 2002 African Cup of Nations ===
Group C

Team	Pld	W	D	L	GF	GA	GD	Pts
Cameroon	3	3	0	0	5	0	+5	9
DR Congo	3	1	1	1	3	2	+1	4
Togo	3	0	2	1	0	3	−3	2
Ivory Coast	3	0	1	2	1	4	−3	1

20 January 2002
17:30

Cameroon	1–0	DR Congo
M'Boma 40'

Stade Babemba Traoré, Sikasso
Attendance: 15,000
Referee: Coffi Codjia (Benin)

21 January 2002
18:00

Togo	0–0	Ivory Coast

Stade Babemba Traoré, Sikasso
Attendance: 15,000
Referee: Chukwudi Chukwujekwu (Nigeria)

25 January 2002
17:30

Cameroon	1–0	Ivory Coast
M'Boma 85'

Stade Babemba Traoré, Sikasso
Attendance: 15,000
Referee: Gamal Al-Ghandour (Egypt)

26 January 2002
17:30

DR Congo	0–0	Togo

Stade Babemba Traoré, Sikasso
Attendance: 7,000
Referee: Hailemalak Tessema (Ethiopia)

29 January 2002
16:00

Cameroon	3–0	Togo
Mettomo 52'; Eto'o 80'; Olembé 89'

Stade Babemba Traoré, Sikasso
Attendance: 6,000
Referee: Petros Mathabela (South Africa)

29 January 2002
16:00

DR Congo	3–1	Ivory Coast
Yuvuladio 28'; Nonda 66'; Kimoto 81' (pen.)		Traoré 86'

Stade Abdoulaye Nakoro Cissoko, Kayes
Attendance: 12,000
Referee: Felix Tangawarima (Zimbabwe)

=== Côte d'Ivoire at the 2006 African Cup of Nations ===
Group A

Team	Pld	W	D	L	GF	GA	GD	Pts
Egypt	3	2	1	0	6	1	+5	7
Ivory Coast	3	2	0	1	4	4	0	6
Morocco	3	0	2	1	0	1	−1	2
Libya	3	0	1	2	1	5	−4	1

20 January 2006
19:00

Egypt	3–0	Libya
Mido 18'; Aboutrika 22'; A. Hassan 78'

Cairo International Stadium, Cairo
Attendance: 65,000
Referee: Lassina Paré (Burkina Faso)

21 January 2006
14:00

Morocco	0–1	Ivory Coast
		Drogba 39' (pen.)

Cairo International Stadium, Cairo
Attendance: 8,000
Referee: Jérôme Damon (South Africa)

24 January 2006
17:15

Libya	1–2	Ivory Coast
Kames 42'		Drogba 10'; Y. Touré 74'

Cairo International Stadium, Cairo
Attendance: 42,000
Referee: Shamsul Maidin (Singapore)

24 January 2006
20:00

Egypt	0–0	Morocco

Cairo International Stadium, Cairo
Attendance: 67,000
Referee: Coffi Codjia (Benin)

28 January 2006
19:00

Egypt	3–1	Ivory Coast
Moteab 8', 69'; Aboutrika 61'		A. Koné 43'

Cairo International Stadium, Cairo
Attendance: 74,000
Referee: Eddy Maillet (Seychelles)

28 January 2006
19:00

Libya	0–0	Morocco

Cairo Military Academy Stadium, Cairo
Attendance: 5,000
Referee: Mourad Daami (Tunisia)

Quarter-final

4 February 2006
19:00

Cameroon	1–1 (a.e.t.)	Ivory Coast
Meyong 95'	Report	B. Koné 92'
Penalties
Eto'o (penalty scored); Geremi (penalty scored); Atouba (penalty scored); Kome (penalty scored); Meyong (penalty scored); Makoun (penalty scored); Song (penalty scored); Saidou (penalty scored); Douala (penalty scored); Bikey (penalty scored); Hamidou (penalty scored); Eto'o (penalty missed)	11–12	(penalty scored) Drogba; (penalty scored) K. Touré; (penalty scored) B. Koné; (penalty scored) Faé; (penalty scored) A. Koné; (penalty scored) Kouassi; (penalty scored) Romaric; (penalty scored) Boka; (penalty scored) Zokora; (penalty scored) Zoro; (penalty scored) Tizié; (penalty scored) Drogba

Cairo Military Academy Stadium, Cairo
Attendance: 4,000
Referee: Mohamed Guezzaz (Morocco)

Semi-final

7 February 2006
15:00

Nigeria	0–1	Ivory Coast
		Drogba 47'

Harras El-Hedoud Stadium, Alexandria
Attendance: 20,000
Referee: Jérôme Damon (South Africa)

Final

10 February 2006
18:00

Egypt	0–0 (a.e.t.)	Ivory Coast
	Report
Penalties
A. Hassan (penalty scored); Abdelwahab (penalty scored); A.H. Ali (penalty missed); Zaki (penalty scored); Aboutrika (penalty scored)	4–2	(penalty missed) Drogba; (penalty scored) K. Touré; (penalty missed) B. Koné; (penalty scored) Eboué

Cairo International Stadium, Cairo
Attendance: 74,100
Referee: Mourad Daami (Tunisia)

=== Côte d'Ivoire at the 2008 African Cup of Nations ===
Group B

Team	Pld	W	D	L	GF	GA	GD	Pts	Qualification
Ivory Coast	3	3	0	0	8	1	+7	9	Advanced to the quarter-finals
Nigeria	3	1	1	1	2	1	+1	4	Advanced to the quarter-finals
Mali	3	1	1	1	1	3	−2	4	
Benin	3	0	0	3	1	7	−6	0	

21 January 2008
17:00

Nigeria	0–1	Ivory Coast
	Report	Kalou 66'

Sekondi Stadium, Sekondi-Takoradi
Attendance: 20,088
Referee: Mohamed Benouza (Algeria)

21 January 2008
19:45

Mali	1–0	Benin
Kanouté 49' (pen.)	Report

Sekondi Stadium, Sekondi-Takoradi
Attendance: 11,000
Referee: Jerome Damon (South Africa)

25 January 2008
17:00

Ivory Coast	4–1	Benin
Drogba 40'; Y. Touré 44'; Keïta 53'; Dindane 63'	Report	Omotoyossi 90'

Sekondi Stadium, Sekondi-Takoradi
Attendance: 13,000
Referee: Kenias Marange (Zimbabwe)

25 January 2008
19:30

Nigeria	0–0	Mali
	Report

Sekondi Stadium, Sekondi-Takoradi
Attendance: 16,000
Referee: Abderrahim El Arjoun (Morocco)

29 January 2008
17:00

Nigeria	2–0	Benin
Mikel 53'; Yakubu 86'	Report

Sekondi Stadium, Sekondi-Takoradi
Attendance: 4,000
Referee: Kacem Bennaceur (Tunisia)

29 January 2008
17:00

Ivory Coast	3–0	Mali
Drogba 9'; Zoro 54'; Sanogo 86'	Report

Ohene Djan Stadium, Accra
Attendance: 20,000
Referee: Eddy Maillet (Seychelles)

Quarter-final

3 February 2008
20:30

Ivory Coast	5–0	Guinea
Keïta 25'; Drogba 70'; Kalou 72', 81'; B. Koné 85'	Report

Sekondi Stadium, Sekondi
Attendance: 14,000
Referee: Djamel Haimoudi (Algeria)

Semi-final

7 February 2008
20:30

Ivory Coast	1–4	Egypt
Keita 63'	Report	Fathy 12'; Zaki 61', 67'; Aboutrika 90+1'

Baba Yara Stadium, Kumasi
Attendance: 30,000
Referee: Eddy Maillet (Seychelles)

Third place match

9 February 2008
17:00

Ghana	4–2	Ivory Coast
Muntari 10'; Owusu-Abeyie 70'; Agogo 80'; Draman 84'	Report	Sanogo 24', 32'

Baba Yara Stadium, Kumasi
Attendance: 40,000
Referee: Jerome Damon (South Africa)

=== Côte d'Ivoire at the 2010 African Cup of Nations ===
Group B

Pos	Team	Pld	W	D	L	GF	GA	GD	Pts	Qualification
1	Ivory Coast	2	1	1	0	3	1	+2	4	Advance to knockout stage
2	Ghana	2	1	0	1	2	3	−1	3	Advance to knockout stage
3	Burkina Faso	2	0	1	1	0	1	−1	1	
4	Togo (D)	0	0	0	0	0	0	0	0 (Note: Togo withdrew from the tournament due to the attack on their team bus while traveling to their opening match against Ghana, thus they were officially disqualified. Group B became a three-team group.)	

Source: CAF
(D) Disqualified
Notes:
11 January 2010
17:00

Ivory Coast	0–0	Burkina Faso
	Report

Estádio Nacional do Chiazi, Cabinda
Attendance: 5,000
Referee: Kacem Bennaceur (Tunisia)
11 January 2010
19:30

Ghana	Cancelled	Togo

Estádio do Chiazi, Cabinda
15 January 2010
17:00

Burkina Faso	Cancelled	Togo

Estádio do Chiazi, Cabinda
15 January 2010
19:30

Ivory Coast	3–1	Ghana
Gervinho 23'; Tiéné 66'; Drogba 90'	Report	Gyan 90+3' (pen.)

Estádio Nacional do Chiazi, Cabinda
Attendance: 23,000
Referee: Jerome Damon (South Africa)
19 January 2010
17:00

Burkina Faso	0–1	Ghana
	Report	A. Ayew 30'

Estádio 11 de Novembro, Luanda
Attendance: 8,000
Referee: Eddy Maillet (Seychelles)
19 January 2010
17:00

Ivory Coast	Cancelled	Togo

Estádio do Chiazi, Cabinda
11 January 2010
17:00

Ivory Coast	0–0	Burkina Faso
	Report

Estádio do Chiazi, Cabinda
Attendance: 5,000
Referee: Kacem Bennaceur (Tunisia)

11 January 2010
19:30

Ghana	Cancelled	Togo

Estádio do Chiazi, Cabinda

15 January 2010
17:00

Burkina Faso	Cancelled	Togo

Estádio do Chiazi, Cabinda

15 January 2010
19:30

Ivory Coast	3–1	Ghana
Gervinho 23'; Tiéné 66'; Drogba 90'	Report	Gyan 90+3' (pen.)

Estádio do Chiazi, Cabinda
Attendance: 23,000
Referee: Jerome Damon (South Africa)

19 January 2010
17:00

Burkina Faso	0–1	Ghana
	Report	A. Ayew 30'

Estádio 11 de Novembro, Luanda
Attendance: 8,000
Referee: Eddy Maillet (Seychelles)

19 January 2010
17:00

Ivory Coast	Cancelled	Togo

Estádio do Chiazi, Cabinda

Quarter-final

24 January 2010
20:30

Ivory Coast	2–3 (a.e.t.)	Algeria
Kalou 4'; Keïta 89'	Report	Matmour 39'; Bougherra 90+2'; Bouazza 92'

Estádio do Chiazi, Cabinda
Attendance: 10,000
Referee: Eddy Maillet (Seychelles)

=== Côte d'Ivoire at the 2012 African Cup of Nations ===
Group B

Pos	Team	Pld	W	D	L	GF	GA	GD	Pts	Qualification
1	Ivory Coast	3	3	0	0	5	0	+5	9	Advance to knockout stage
2	Sudan	3	1	1	1	4	4	0	4	Advance to knockout stage
3	Angola	3	1	1	1	4	5	−1	4	
4	Burkina Faso	3	0	0	3	2	6	−4	0	

Source: CAF
22 January 2012
17:00

Ivory Coast	1–0	Sudan
Drogba 39'	Report

Estadio de Malabo, Malabo
Attendance: 5,000
Referee: Rajindraparsad Seechurn (Mauritius)
22 January 2012
20:00

Burkina Faso	1–2	Angola
A. Traoré 58'	Report	Mateus Galiano 48'; Manucho 68'

Estadio de Malabo, Malabo
Attendance: 17,000
Referee: Mohamed Benouza (Algeria)
26 January 2012
17:00

Sudan	2–2	Angola
Bashir 32', 74'	Report	Manucho 4', 50' (pen.)

Estadio de Malabo, Malabo
Attendance: 2,500
Referee: Ali Lemghaifry (Mauritania)
26 January 2012
20:00

Ivory Coast	2–0	Burkina Faso
Kalou 16'; B. Koné 82' (o.g.)	Report

Estadio de Malabo, Malabo
Attendance: 4,000
Referee: Gehad Grisha (Egypt)
30 January 2012
19:00

Sudan	2–1	Burkina Faso
Karika 33', 79'	Report	Ouédraogo 90+5'

Estadio de Bata, Bata
Attendance: 132
Referee: Eric Otogo-Castane (Gabon)
30 January 2012
19:00

Ivory Coast	2–0	Angola
Eboué 33'; Bony 64'	Report

Estadio de Malabo, Malabo
Attendance: 1,500
Referee: Slim Jedidi (Tunisia)

22 January 2012
Ivory Coast	1–0	Sudan	Estadio de Malabo, Malabo
Burkina Faso	1–2	Angola	Estadio de Malabo, Malabo
26 January 2012
Sudan	2–2	Angola	Estadio de Malabo, Malabo
Ivory Coast	2–0	Burkina Faso	Estadio de Malabo, Malabo
30 January 2012
Sudan	2–1	Burkina Faso	Estadio de Bata, Bata
Ivory Coast	2–0	Angola	Estadio de Malabo, Malabo

Quarterfinal

4 February 2012
20:00

Ivory Coast	3–0	Equatorial Guinea
Drogba 35', 69'; Y. Touré 81'	Report

Estadio de Malabo, Malabo
Attendance: 12,500
Referee: Eddy Maillet (Seychelles)

Semifinal

8 February 2012
20:00

Mali	0–1	Ivory Coast
	Report	Gervinho 45'

Stade d'Angondjé, Libreville
Attendance: 32,000
Referee: Daniel Bennett (South Africa)

Final

12 February 2012
20:30 (Note: Original kick-off at 20:00 but CAF announced on 9 February 2012 that the final would be delayed by half an hour due to "technical and logistical reasons".)

Zambia	0–0 (a.e.t.)	Ivory Coast
	Report
Penalties
C. Katongo (penalty scored); Mayuka (penalty scored); Chansa (penalty scored); F. Katongo (penalty scored); Mweene (penalty scored); Sinkala (penalty scored); Chisamba (penalty scored); Kalaba (penalty missed); Sunzu (penalty scored)	8–7	(penalty scored) Tioté; (penalty scored) Bony; (penalty scored) Bamba; (penalty scored) Gradel; (penalty scored) Drogba; (penalty scored) Tiéné; (penalty scored) Ya Konan; (penalty missed) K. Touré; (penalty missed) Gervinho

Stade d'Angondjé, Libreville
Attendance: 40,000
Referee: Badara Diatta (Senegal)

=== Côte d'Ivoire at the 2013 African Cup of Nations ===
Group D

Pos	Team	Pld	W	D	L	GF	GA	GD	Pts	Qualification
1	Ivory Coast	3	2	1	0	7	3	+4	7	Advance to knockout stage
2	Togo	3	1	1	1	4	3	+1	4	Advance to knockout stage
3	Tunisia	3	1	1	1	2	4	−2	4	
4	Algeria	3	0	1	2	2	5	−3	1	

Source: CAF
22 January 2013
17:00

Ivory Coast	2–1	Togo
Y. Touré 8'; Gervinho 88'	Report	J. Ayité 45+2'

Royal Bafokeng Stadium, Rustenburg
Attendance: 2,000
Referee: Sidi Alioum (Cameroon)
22 January 2013
20:00

Tunisia	1–0	Algeria
Msakni 90+1'	Report

Royal Bafokeng Stadium, Rustenburg
Attendance: 10,000
Referee: Bakary Gassama (Gambia)
26 January 2013
17:00

Ivory Coast	3–0	Tunisia
Gervinho 21'; Y. Touré 87'; Ya Konan 90'	Report

Royal Bafokeng Stadium, Rustenburg
Attendance: 20,000
Referee: Rajindraparsad Seechurn (Mauritius)
26 January 2013
20:00

Algeria	0–2	Togo
	Report	Adebayor 31'; Womé 90+5'

Royal Bafokeng Stadium, Rustenburg
Attendance: 35,000
Referee: Hamada Nampiandraza (Madagascar)
30 January 2013
19:00

Algeria	2–2	Ivory Coast
Feghouli 64' (pen.); Soudani 70'	Report	Drogba 77'; Bony 81'

Royal Bafokeng Stadium, Rustenburg
Attendance: 5,000
Referee: Eric Otogo-Castane (Gabon)
30 January 2013
19:00

Togo	1–1	Tunisia
Gakpé 13'	Report	Mouelhi 30' (pen.)

Mbombela Stadium, Nelspruit
Attendance: 7,500
Referee: Daniel Bennett (South Africa)

22 January 2013
Ivory Coast	2–1	Togo	Royal Bafokeng Stadium, Rustenburg
Tunisia	1–0	Algeria	Royal Bafokeng Stadium, Rustenburg
26 January 2013
Ivory Coast	3–0	Tunisia	Royal Bafokeng Stadium, Rustenburg
Algeria	0–2	Togo	Royal Bafokeng Stadium, Rustenburg
30 January 2013
Algeria	2–2	Ivory Coast	Royal Bafokeng Stadium, Rustenburg
Togo	1–1	Tunisia	Mbombela Stadium, Nelspruit

Quarter-final

3 February 2013
17:00

Ivory Coast	1–2	Nigeria
Tioté 50'	Report	Emenike 43'; Mba 78'

Royal Bafokeng Stadium, Rustenburg
Attendance: 25,000
Referee: Djamel Haimoudi (Algeria)

=== Côte d'Ivoire at the 2015 African Cup of Nations ===
Group D

Guinea and Mali finished level on the second spot after the group stage, making the first drawing of lots needed at the tournament since 1988. Unlike some other international tournaments, 2015 Africa Cup of Nations tournament regulations would not use fair-play criteria or a penalty shoot-out after the teams met on the last match day to determine the final group ranking. Both head coaches have openly criticised the regulations.

Pos	Team	Pld	W	D	L	GF	GA	GD	Pts	Qualification
1	Ivory Coast	3	1	2	0	3	2	+1	5	Advance to knockout stage
2	Guinea	3	0	3	0	3	3	0	3 (Note: Guinea and Mali were tied on head-to-head record, overall goal difference, and overall goals scored. A drawing of lots took place on 29 January 2015, 16:00 local time at the Hilton Malabo. Guinea selected the lot for 2nd place and advanced to the quarter-finals as the group runner-up.)	Advance to knockout stage
3	Mali	3	0	3	0	3	3	0	3	
4	Cameroon	3	0	2	1	2	3	−1	2	

Source: CAF
Rules for classification: Tiebreakers
Notes:
20 January 2015
17:00

Ivory Coast	1–1	Guinea
Doumbia 72'	Report	M. Yattara 36'

Estadio de Malabo, Malabo
Attendance: 14,875
Referee: Mehdi Abid Charef (Algeria)
20 January 2015
20:00

Mali	1–1	Cameroon
S. Yatabaré 71'	Report	Oyongo 84'

Estadio de Malabo, Malabo
Attendance: 15,000
Referee: Janny Sikazwe (Zambia)
24 January 2015
17:00

Ivory Coast	1–1	Mali
Gradel 86'	Report	Sako 7'

Estadio de Malabo, Malabo
Attendance: 14,890
Referee: Bouchaïb El Ahrach (Morocco)
24 January 2015
20:00

Cameroon	1–1	Guinea
Moukandjo 13'	Report	Traoré 42'

Estadio de Malabo, Malabo
Attendance: 15,000
Referee: Tessema Bamlak (Ethiopia)
28 January 2015
19:00

Cameroon	0–1	Ivory Coast
	Report	Gradel 35'

Estadio de Malabo, Malabo
Attendance: 15,230
Referee: Eric Otogo-Castane (Gabon)
28 January 2015
19:00

Guinea	1–1	Mali
Constant 15' (pen.)	Report	Maïga 47'

Estadio de Mongomo, Mongomo
Attendance: 13,470
Referee: Mohamed Said Kordi (Tunisia)

Quarter-final

1 February 2015
20:30

Ivory Coast	3–1	Algeria
Bony 26', 68'; Gervinho 90+4'	Report	Soudani 51'

Estadio de Malabo, Malabo
Attendance: 15,000
Referee: Bakary Gassama (Gambia)

Semi-final

4 February 2015
20:00

DR Congo	1–3	Ivory Coast
Mbokani 24' (pen.)	Report	Y. Touré 20'; Gervinho 41'; Kanon 68'

Estadio de Bata, Bata
Attendance: 30,000
Referee: Sidi Alioum (Cameroon)

Final

8 February 2015
20:00

Ivory Coast	0–0 (a.e.t.)	Ghana
	Report
Penalties
Bony (penalty missed); Tallo (penalty missed); Aurier (penalty scored); Doumbia (penalty scored); Y. Touré (penalty scored); Kalou (penalty scored); K. Touré (penalty scored); Kanon (penalty scored); Bailly (penalty scored); Die (penalty scored); Barry (penalty scored)	9–8	(penalty scored) Wakaso; (penalty scored) J. Ayew; (penalty missed) Acquah; (penalty missed) Acheampong; (penalty scored) A. Ayew; (penalty scored) Mensah; (penalty scored) Badu; (penalty scored) Afful; (penalty scored) Baba; (penalty scored) Boye; (penalty missed) Razak

Estadio de Bata, Bata
Attendance: 32,857
Referee: Bakary Gassama (Gambia)

=== Côte d'Ivoire at the 2017 African Cup of Nations ===
Group C

Pos	Team	Pld	W	D	L	GF	GA	GD	Pts	Qualification
1	DR Congo	3	2	1	0	6	3	+3	7	Advance to knockout stage
2	Morocco	3	2	0	1	4	2	+2	6	Advance to knockout stage
3	Ivory Coast	3	0	2	1	2	3	−1	2	
4	Togo	3	0	1	2	2	6	−4	1	

Source: CAF
16 January 2017
17:00

Ivory Coast	0–0	Togo
	Report

Stade d'Oyem, Oyem
Referee: Eric Otogo-Castane (Gabon)
16 January 2017
20:00

DR Congo	1–0	Morocco
Kabananga 55'	Report

Stade d'Oyem, Oyem
Referee: Hamada Nampiandraza (Madagascar)

20 January 2017
17:00

Ivory Coast	2–2	DR Congo
Bony 25'; Dié 67'	Report	Kebano 10'; Kabananga 28'

Stade d'Oyem, Oyem
Referee: Janny Sikazwe (Zambia)
20 January 2017
20:00

Morocco	3–1	Togo
Bouhaddouz 14'; Saïss 21'; En-Nesyri 72'	Report	Dossevi 5'

Stade d'Oyem, Oyem
Referee: Mahamadou Keita (Mali)

24 January 2017
20:00

Morocco	1–0	Ivory Coast
Alioui 64'	Report

Stade d'Oyem, Oyem
Referee: Sidi Alioum (Cameroon)
24 January 2017
20:00

Togo	1–3	DR Congo
Laba 69'	Report	Kabananga 29'; Mubele 54'; M'Poku 80'

Stade de Port-Gentil, Port-Gentil
Referee: Malang Diedhiou (Senegal)

=== Côte d'Ivoire at the 2019 African Cup of Nations ===
Group D

Pos	Team	Pld	W	D	L	GF	GA	GD	Pts	Qualification
1	Morocco	3	3	0	0	3	0	+3	9	Advance to knockout stage
2	Ivory Coast	3	2	0	1	5	2	+3	6	Advance to knockout stage
3	South Africa	3	1	0	2	1	2	−1	3	Advance to knockout stage
4	Namibia	3	0	0	3	1	6	−5	0	

Source: CAF
23 June 2019
16:30

Morocco	1–0	Namibia
Keimuine 89' (o.g.)	Report

Al Salam Stadium, Cairo
Attendance: 6,857
Referee: Louis Hakizimana (Rwanda)
24 June 2019
16:30

Ivory Coast	1–0	South Africa
Kodjia 64'	Report

Al Salam Stadium, Cairo
Attendance: 4,961
Referee: Mustapha Ghorbal (Algeria)

28 June 2019
19:00

Morocco	1–0	Ivory Coast
En-Nesyri 23'	Report

Al Salam Stadium, Cairo
Attendance: 27,500
Referee: Sidi Alioum (Cameroon)
28 June 2019
22:00

South Africa	1–0	Namibia
Zungu 68'	Report

Al Salam Stadium, Cairo
Attendance: 16,090
Referee: Issa Sy (Senegal)

1 July 2019
18:00

South Africa	0–1	Morocco
	Report	Boussoufa 90'

Al Salam Stadium, Cairo
Attendance: 12,098
Referee: Jean-Jacques Ndala (DR Congo)
1 July 2019
18:00

Namibia	1–4	Ivory Coast
Kamatuka 71'	Report	Gradel 39'; Dié 58'; Zaha 84'; Cornet 89'

30 June Stadium, Cairo
Attendance: 7,530
Referee: Peter Waweru (Kenya)

Round of 16

8 July 2019
18:00

Mali	0–1	Ivory Coast
	Report	Zaha 76'

Suez Stadium, Suez
Attendance: 7,672
Referee: Janny Sikazwe (Zambia)

Quarter-final

11 July 2019
18:00

Ivory Coast	1–1 (a.e.t.)	Algeria
Kodjia 62'	Report	Feghouli 20'
Penalties
Kessié (penalty scored); Cornet (penalty scored); Bony (penalty missed); Gradel (penalty scored); Dié (penalty missed)	3–4	(penalty scored) Bensebaini; (penalty scored) Slimani; (penalty scored) Delort; (penalty scored) Ounas; (penalty missed) Belaïli

Suez Stadium, Suez
Attendance: 8,233
Referee: Bamlak Tessema Weyesa (Ethiopia)

=== Côte d'Ivoire at the 2021 African Cup of Nations ===
Group E

Pos	Team	Pld	W	D	L	GF	GA	GD	Pts	Qualification
1	Ivory Coast	3	2	1	0	6	3	+3	7	Advance to knockout stage
2	Equatorial Guinea	3	2	0	1	2	1	+1	6	Advance to knockout stage
3	Sierra Leone	3	0	2	1	2	3	−1	2	
4	Algeria	3	0	1	2	1	4	−3	1	

Source: CAF
11 January 2022
14:00

Algeria	0–0	Sierra Leone
	Report

Japoma Stadium, Douala
Referee: Ahmad Imetehaz Heeralall (Mauritius)
12 January 2022
20:00

Equatorial Guinea	0–1	Ivory Coast
	Report	Gradel 5'

Japoma Stadium, Douala
Referee: Redouane Jiyed (Morocco)

16 January 2022
17:00

Ivory Coast	2–2	Sierra Leone
Haller 25'; Pépé 65'	Report	Mu. Kamara 55'; A. Kamara 90+3'

Japoma Stadium, Douala
Referee: Maguette N'Diaye (Senegal)
16 January 2022
20:00

Algeria	0–1	Equatorial Guinea
	Report	Esteban 70'

Japoma Stadium, Douala
Referee: Mario Escobar (Guatemala)

20 January 2022
17:00

Ivory Coast	3–1	Algeria
Kessié 22'; I. Sangaré 39'; Pépé 54'	Report	Bendebka 73'

Japoma Stadium, Douala
Referee: Victor Gomes (South Africa)
20 January 2022
17:00

Sierra Leone	0–1	Equatorial Guinea
	Report	Ganet 38'

Limbe Stadium, Limbe
Referee: Mohamed Marouf Eid Mansour (Egypt)

Round of 16

26 January 2022
17:00

Ivory Coast	0–0 (a.e.t.)	Egypt
	Report
Penalties
Pépé (penalty scored); I. Sangaré (penalty scored); Bailly (penalty missed); Cornet (penalty scored); Zaha (penalty scored)	4–5	(penalty scored) Zizo; (penalty scored) El Solia; (penalty scored) Kamal; (penalty scored) Abdelmonem; (penalty scored) Salah

Japoma Stadium, Douala
Referee: Jean-Jacques Ndala (DR Congo)

=== Côte d'Ivoire at the 2023 African Cup of Nations ===
Group A

Pos	Team	Pld	W	D	L	GF	GA	GD	Pts	Qualification
1	Equatorial Guinea	3	2	1	0	9	3	+6	7 (Note: Tied on head-to-head points. Overall goal difference: Equatorial Guinea +6, Nigeria +2.)	Advance to knockout stage
2	Nigeria	3	2	1	0	3	1	+2	7	Advance to knockout stage
3	Ivory Coast (H)	3	1	0	2	2	5	−3	3	Advance to knockout stage
4	Guinea-Bissau	3	0	0	3	2	7	−5	0	

Source: CAF
(H) Hosts
Notes:
13 January 2024
20:00

Ivory Coast	2–0	Guinea-Bissau
S. Fofana 4'; Krasso 58'	Report

Alassane Ouattara Stadium, Abidjan
Attendance: 36,858
Referee: Amin Omar (Egypt)
14 January 2024
14:00

Nigeria	1–1	Equatorial Guinea
Osimhen 38'	Report	Salvador 36'

Alassane Ouattara Stadium, Abidjan
Attendance: 8,500
Referee: Abongile Tom (South Africa)

18 January 2024
14:00

Equatorial Guinea	4–2	Guinea-Bissau
Nsue 21', 51', 61'; Miranda 46'	Report	Esteban 37' (o.g.); Zé Turbo 90+3'

Alassane Ouattara Stadium, Abidjan
Attendance: 13,888
Referee: Samuel Uwikunda (Rwanda)
18 January 2024
17:00

Ivory Coast	0–1	Nigeria
	Report	Troost-Ekong 55' (pen.)

Alassane Ouattara Stadium, Abidjan
Attendance: 49,517
Referee: Mustapha Ghorbal (Algeria)

22 January 2024
17:00

Equatorial Guinea	4–0	Ivory Coast
Nsue 42', 75'; Ganet 73'; Buyla 88'	Report

Alassane Ouattara Stadium, Abidjan
Attendance: 42,550
Referee: Mahmood Ismail (Sudan)
22 January 2024
17:00

Guinea-Bissau	0–1	Nigeria
	Report	Sanganté 36' (o.g.)

Felix Houphouet Boigny Stadium, Abidjan
Attendance: 15,650
Referee: Bouchra Karboubi (Morocco)

Round of 16

29 January 2024
20:00

Senegal	1–1 (a.e.t.)	Ivory Coast
H. Diallo 4'	Report	Kessié 86' (pen.)
Penalties
Koulibaly (penalty scored); P. Sarr (penalty scored); Niakhaté (penalty missed); Dieng (penalty scored); Mané (penalty scored)	4–5	(penalty scored) Pépé; (penalty scored) Kouamé; (penalty scored) Haller; (penalty scored) Aurier; (penalty scored) Kessié

Charles Konan Banny Stadium, Yamoussoukro
Attendance: 19,948
Referee: Pierre Atcho (Gabon)

Semi-finals

7 February 2024
20:00

Ivory Coast	1–0	DR Congo
Haller 65'	Report

Alassane Ouattara Stadium, Abidjan
Attendance: 51,020
Referee: Mutaz Ibrahim (Libya)

Final

11 February 2024
20:00

Nigeria	1–2	Ivory Coast
Troost-Ekong 38'	Report	Kessié 62'; Haller 81'

Alassane Ouattara Stadium, Abidjan
Attendance: 57,094
Referee: Dahane Beida (Mauritania)

== By opponent ==
List accurate as of the 2023 tournament.

A * indicates the national team is now defunct.

Legend
Won more than lost
Won equals lost
Lost more than won

Opponent	Pld	W	D	L	GF	GA	GD	Win %
Ghana	10	3	2	5	14	18	-4	33,33%
Egypt	10	1	3	6	7	16	-9	10,00%
Algeria	9	4	3	2	18	12	+6	44,44%
Cameroon	8	1	2	5	4	11	-7	12,50%
Nigeria	8	3	2	3	7	7	0	37,50%
Mali	6	5	1	0	11	3	+8	83,33%
DR Congo	6	3	2	1	11	7	+4	50,00%
Morocco	5	2	1	2	4	4	0	40,00%
Togo	5	2	3	0	6	2	4	40,00%
Zambia	4	1	1	2	1	2	-1	25,00%
Ethiopia	3	2	0	1	7	2	5	66,67%
Equatorial Guinea	3	2	0	1	4	4	0	66,67%
Senegal	3	2	1	0	3	1	+2	66,67%
Uganda	2	1	1	0	4	3	+1	50,00%
Sudan	2	2	0	0	2	0	+2	100,00%
Mozambique	2	2	0	0	4	0	+4	100,00%
Sierra Leone	2	1	1	0	6	2	+4	50,00%
Tunisia	2	1	0	1	4	3	+1	50,00%
Namibia	2	2	0	0	8	4	+4	100,00%
South Africa	2	1	1	0	2	1	+1	50,00%
Angola	2	2	0	0	7	2	+5	100,00%
Guinea	2	1	1	0	6	1	+5	50,00%
Burkina Faso	2	1	1	0	2	0	+2	50,00%
Libya	1	1	0	0	2	1	+1	100,00%
Benin	1	1	0	0	4	1	+3	100,00%
Congo	1	0	1	0	0	0	0	0,00%
United Arab Rep.*	1	0	0	1	1	3	-2	0,00%
Tanzania	1	0	1	0	1	1	0	0,00%
Guinea-Bissau	1	1	0	0	2	0	2	100,00%
Total (29)	106	48	28	30	151	112	+39	45,28%

== See also ==
- Ivory Coast at the FIFA World Cup
