= Eustache Manglé =

Ivorian footballer (born 1946)

Personal information
- Full name: Eustache Miessan Manglé
- Date of birth: 20 September 1946 (age 80)
- Position: Forward

Senior career*
Years	Team	Apps	(Gls)
- ASEC Mimosas

International career
1965–1968	Ivory Coast	30	(7)

Managerial career
- 1992–1993: ASEC Mimosas
Medal record
Men's football
Representing Ivory Coast
Africa Cup of Nations
Third place	1965 Tunisia
Third place	1968 Ethiopia
- * Club domestic league appearances and goals

Eustache Miessan Manglé (born 20 September 1946) is an Ivorian former footballer who played as a forward.

== Early life and career ==
When Manglé was young, he grew up with Ivorian international footballer Laurent Pokou. During the 1960s, he played for ASEC Mimosas, where he spent his entire playing career.

Manglé made 30 appearances for the Ivory Coast national team between 1965 and 1968, scoring 7 goals. At the 1965 African Cup of Nations, he scored the country's first ever goal at the tournament, and was the joint-top goalscorer alongside Ghana's Ben Acheampong and Osei Kofi. Manglé also played for the Ivory Coast at the 1968 African Cup of Nations.

== Managerial career ==
Manglé coached ASEC Mimosas between 1992 and 1993, where he won two Ivorian Ligue 1 titles.

== Later life ==
As of 2025, Manglé lives in Bingerville.
