= Oladipupo =

Oladipupo is both a given name and a surname. Notable people with the name include:

- Oladipupo Olatunde Adebutu (born 1962), Nigerian politician
- Oladipupo Babalola (born 1968), Nigerian footballer
- Oladipupo Martins (1983–2011), Nigerian footballer
- Adebukola Oladipupo (born 1994), Nigerian actress
- Lawal Murtadah Oladipupo (born 1995), Nigerian footballer
- Wassiou Oladipupo (born 1983), Beninese footballer
