= Azy =

Azy may refer to:

== Places ==
- Al-'Azy, also transliterated Al-'Azi, Israel
- Azy, Cher, commune in the Cher department in the Centre-Val de Loire region of France
- Azy (fr), a hamlet of the municipality of Florenville, Wallonia
- Azy-le-Vif, commune in the Nièvre department in central France
- Azy-sur-Marne, commune in the department of Aisne in the Hauts-de-France region of northern France
- Saint-Benin-d'Azy, commune in the Nièvre department in central France

== Other ==
- AZY, the ICAO code for Arizona Airways (1993–1996)
- Azy (orangutan), male orangutan

== See also ==
- Azie, a surname
