= Lawal (given name) =

Lawal is a given name. Notable people with the name include:

- Lawal Bilbis (born 1961), Nigerian biochemist and educator
- Lawal Musa Daura (born 1953), Nigerian security official
- Lawal Yahaya Gumau (1968–2025), Nigerian politician
- Lawal Haruna (born 1957), Nigerian Governor of Borno State
- Lawal Jafaru Isa, Nigerian Army Brigadier General and Military Administrator of Kaduna State
- Lawal Ismail (born 1991), Nigerian footballer
- Lawal Kaita (1932–2018), Nigerian politician
- Lawal Murtadah Oladipupo (born 1995), Nigerian footballer
- Lawal Shehu (born 1985), Nigerian tennis player

== See also ==
- Lawal
