= 1973 African Cup of Champions Clubs =

Tournament details
- Dates: April - 16 December 1973
- Teams: 24 (from 1 confederation)

Final positions
- Champions: (Zaire) AS Vita Club (1st title)
- Runners-up: (Ghana) Asante Kotoko

Tournament statistics
- Matches played: 44
- Goals scored: 142 (3.23 per match)
- Top scorer(s): (Guinea) Chérif Souleymane (5 goals)

The African Cup of Champions Clubs 1973 was the 9th edition of the annual international club football competition held in the CAF region (Africa), the African Cup of Champions Clubs. It determined that year's club champion of association football in Africa.

The tournament was played by 24 teams and used a knock-out format with ties played home and away. AS Vita Club from Zaire won the final, and became CAF club champion for the first time.

== First round ==
Team 1	Agg.	Team 2	1st leg	2nd leg
ASEC Mimosas (Ivory Coast)	5–2	(Liberia) Mighty Barrolle	2–1	3–1
Kenya Breweries	2–2 (5–4 p)	(Ethiopia) Tele SC Asmara	1–1	1–1
CARA Brazzaville (Republic of the Congo)	3–2	(Burundi) Sports Dynamic	1–0	2–2
AS Forces Armées (Dakar) (Senegal)	4–6	(Togo) Modèle Lomé	2–2	2–4
Fortior Mahajanga (Madagascar)	6–3	(Lesotho) Police FC	5–1	1–2
Horseed FC (Somalia)	3–6	(Egypt) Ismaily	3–1	0–5
Mighty Jets (Nigeria)	2–2^{1}	(Republic of Upper Volta) AS Jeanne d'Arc	2–1	0–1
Young Africans (Tanzania)	2–3	(Sudan) Al-Merrikh	1–2	1–1

^{1} AS Jeanne d'Arc withdrew after the 2nd leg.

== Second round ==
Team 1	Agg.	Team 2	1st leg	2nd leg
Al-Merrikh (Sudan)	1–4	(Ghana) Asante Kotoko	1–1	0–3
Kenya Breweries	4–3	(Uganda) Simba FC	3–1	1–2
Hafia FC (Guinea)	5–5 (3–2 p)	(Ivory Coast) ASEC Mimosas	2–1	3–4
Ismaily (Egypt)	5–1	(Libya) Al-Ahly Benghazi	4–1	1–0
Kabwe Warriors (Zambia)	7–0	(Madagascar) Fortior Mahajanga	4–0	3–0
Léopard Douala (Cameroon)	2–1	(Republic of the Congo) CARA Brazzaville	2–0	0–1
Stade Malien (Mali)	2–1	(Togo) Modèle Lomé	2–1	0–0
AS Vita Club (Zaire)	w/o^{1}	(Nigeria) Mighty Jets	—	—

^{1} Mighty Jets were forced to withdraw as they could not afford the cost of travel to Zaire for the first leg.

== Quarter-finals ==
Team 1	Agg.	Team 2	1st leg	2nd leg
Kenya Breweries	1–2^{1}	(Egypt) Ismaily	0–0	1–2
Hafia FC (Guinea)	5–6	(Cameroon) Léopard Douala	2–4	3–2
Kabwe Warriors (Zambia)	2–3	(Ghana) Asante Kotoko	2–1	0–2
Stade Malien (Mali)	1–7	(Zaire) AS Vita Club	0–3	1–4

^{1} Ismaily SC withdrew after the 2nd leg.

== Semi-finals ==
Team 1	Agg.	Team 2	1st leg	2nd leg
Kenya Breweries	1–4	(Ghana) Asante Kotoko	0–2	1–2
AS Vita Club (Zaire)	4–3	(Cameroon) Léopard Douala	3–0	1–3

== Final ==
25 November 1973
--:-- UTC+0

Asante Kotoko (Ghana)	4–2	(Zaire) AS Vita Club
Jabir 8'; Sam 52', 57'; Acquah 59'		Mayanga 26'; Mavuba 65' (pen.)

Kumasi Stadium, Kumasi
16 December 1973
--:-- UTC+1

AS Vita Club (Zaire)	3–0	(Ghana) Asante Kotoko
Mayanga 55', 77'; Kembo ?'

20 May Stadium, Kinshasa

== Champion ==
African Cup of Champions Clubs
1973 Winners

AS Vita Club
First Title

== Top scorers ==
The top scorers from the 1973 African Cup of Champions Clubs are as follows:

Rank	Name	Team	Goals
1	(Guinea) Chérif Souleymane	(Guinea) Hafia FC	5
2	(Ivory Coast) Laurent Pokou	(Ivory Coast) ASEC Mimosas	4
3	(Egypt) Ismail Hefny	(Egypt) Ismaily	3
3	(Egypt) Ossama Khalil	(Egypt) Ismaily	3
3	(Zaire) Mayanga Maku	(Zaire) AS Vita Club	3
6	(Cameroon) Roger Milla	(Cameroon) Léopard Douala	2
6	(Egypt) Sayed Abdel Razek	(Egypt) Ismaily	2
6	(Egypt) Ali Abo Greisha	(Egypt) Ismaily	2
6	(Guinea) Petit Sory	(Guinea) Hafia FC	2
6	(Ivory Coast) Bernard N'Guessan	(Ivory Coast) ASEC Mimosas	2
6	(Zaire) Ndaye Mulamba	(Zaire) AS Vita Club	2
6	(Ghana) Joe Sam	(Ghana) Asante Kotoko	2
6	(Zambia) Godfrey Chitalu	(Zambia) Kabwe Warriors	2
