= Moses Orkuma =

Nigerian footballer (born 1994)

Personal information
- Full name: Moses Orkuma
- Date of birth: 19 July 1994 (age 32)
- Place of birth: Gboko, Nigeria
- Height: 1.71 m (5 ft 7 in)
- Position: Midfielder

Team information
- Current team: Al-Quwa Al-Jawiya
- Number: 16

Youth career
- 2002–2005: Abaya Academy
- 2005–2007: BCC Lions F.C.
- 2007–2009: Abaya Academy
- 2009–2011: Babanawa F.C.

Senior career*
Years	Team	Apps	(Gls)
2011–2013	Lobi Stars		
2013–2014	Al-Ahly Benghazi		
2014–2017	Étoile Sportive du Sahel	1	(0)
2016–2017	→ Al Ahli Tripol (loan)		
2017–2019	Stade Gabèsien	50	(1)
2019–2020	US Monastir	24	(0)
2020–2022	Umm Salal	45	(0)
2022–2023	Al-Tadamon	22	(0)
2023–2025	US Monastir	54	(0)
2025–2026	Raja CA	4	(0)
2026–	Al-Quwa Al-Jawiya	4	(0)

International career
2013–2015	Nigeria U20	14	(1)
- * Club domestic league appearances and goals as of 15 November 2025

Moses Orkuma (born 19 July 1994) is a Nigerian footballer who plays as a midfielder for Iraq Stars League club Al-Quwa Al-Jawiya.

== Club career ==
Moses Orkuma was born on 19 July 1994 in Gboko and started playing football when he was six years old.

In his secondary school days at Government Secondary School Gboko, he joined Abaya Babes Football Academy before joining the juniors of BCC Lions. When he was promoted to the senior team, he went back to Abaya. In 2009, he joined Babanawa FC, a National League division one side. In 2011, he was signed by Lobi Stars FC.

In September 2013, Orkuma joined Al-Ahly Benghazi from Lobi Stars, citing that "the offer was better than those from Europe". He joined the Libyan club on a one-year deal. He made his debut against Olympic Azzaweya in a 1-1 home draw.

In June 2014 Orkuma joined Tunisian club Étoile Sportive du Sahel on a free transfer, signing a four-year contract.

In 2016, Orkuma signed for Libyan side Al Ahli SC on loan until the endo of the season. He scored his first goal in a friendly match against Olympique Sidi Bouzid in January 2016. At the end of the season Al Ahli and Etoile du Sahel extended his loan at the Libyan club.

On 20 July 2017, Orkuma joined Stade Gabèsien in Tunisia, on a two-year contract.

On 19 June 2019, Orkuma joined US Monastir on a two-year deal. He helped Monastir classify to the CAF Confederation Cup for the first time, by winning the Tunisian Cup. His club finished third in the league and he made the team of the season.

In 2020, he signed for Qatari club Umm Salal SC, on a reported fee of $500,000, signing a two-year contract.

On 5 June 2025, he signed a two-year contract with Raja CA, under Lassaad Chabbi who coached him in Monastir back in 2020.

== International career ==
Orkuma has described playing for the Nigeria national under-20 team as the highlight of his career. He took part in the 2013 FIFA U-20 World Cup and te 2013 African U-20 Championship.

== Honours ==
Al Ahli Tripoli

- Libyan Premier League: 2015–16

US Monastir

- Tunisian Cup: 2019–20
