= Dadzie =

Dadzie is a surname. Notable people with the surname include:

- Ebenezer Dadzie (born 1975), Ghanaian football striker
- Emmanuel Kodjoe Dadzie (1916–1983), Ghanaian diplomat
- Francis Dadzie, Ghanaian professional footballer
- Gifty Afenyi-Dadzie (born 1957), Ghanaian female journalist and businesswoman
- Ken Dadzie, Ghanaian soldier
- Kenneth Dadzie (1930–1995), Ghanaian diplomat
- Stella Dadzie (born 1952), British educationalist, activist, writer and historian

== See also ==
- John Dadzie, better known by his musical aliases 12th Planet and Infiltrata
- Adze
- Azie
