= Ivory Coast at the FIFA World Cup =

International football delegation

Ivory Coast, recognized by FIFA as Côte d'Ivoire, have appeared in the FIFA World Cup on four occasions in 2006, 2010, 2014, and 2026.

== FIFA World Cup record ==
Year	Round	Position	Pld	W	D	L	GF	GA
(Uruguay) 1930	Part of France							
(Italy) 1934	Part of France							
(France) 1938	Part of France							
(Brazil) 1950	Part of France							
(Switzerland) 1954	Part of France							
(Sweden) 1958	Part of France							
(Chile) 1962	Not a FIFA member							
(England) 1966	Did not enter							
(Mexico) 1970	Did not enter							
(West Germany) 1974	Did not qualify							
(Argentina) 1978	Did not qualify							
(Spain) 1982	Did not enter							
(Mexico) 1986	Did not qualify							
(Italy) 1990	Did not qualify							
(United States) 1994	Did not qualify							
(France) 1998	Did not qualify							
(South Korea) (Japan) 2002	Did not qualify							
(Germany) 2006	Group stage	19th	3	1	0	2	5	6
(South Africa) 2010	Group stage	17th	3	1	1	1	4	3
(Brazil) 2014	Group stage	21st	3	1	0	2	4	5
(Russia) 2018	Did not qualify							
(Qatar) 2022	Did not qualify							
(Canada) (Mexico) (United States) 2026	Round of 32	19th	4	2	0	2	5	4
(Morocco) (Portugal) (Spain) 2030								
(Saudi Arabia) 2034
Total	Round of 32	4/23	13	5	1	7	18	18

== Participation history ==
=== Côte d'Ivoire at the 2006 FIFA World Cup ===
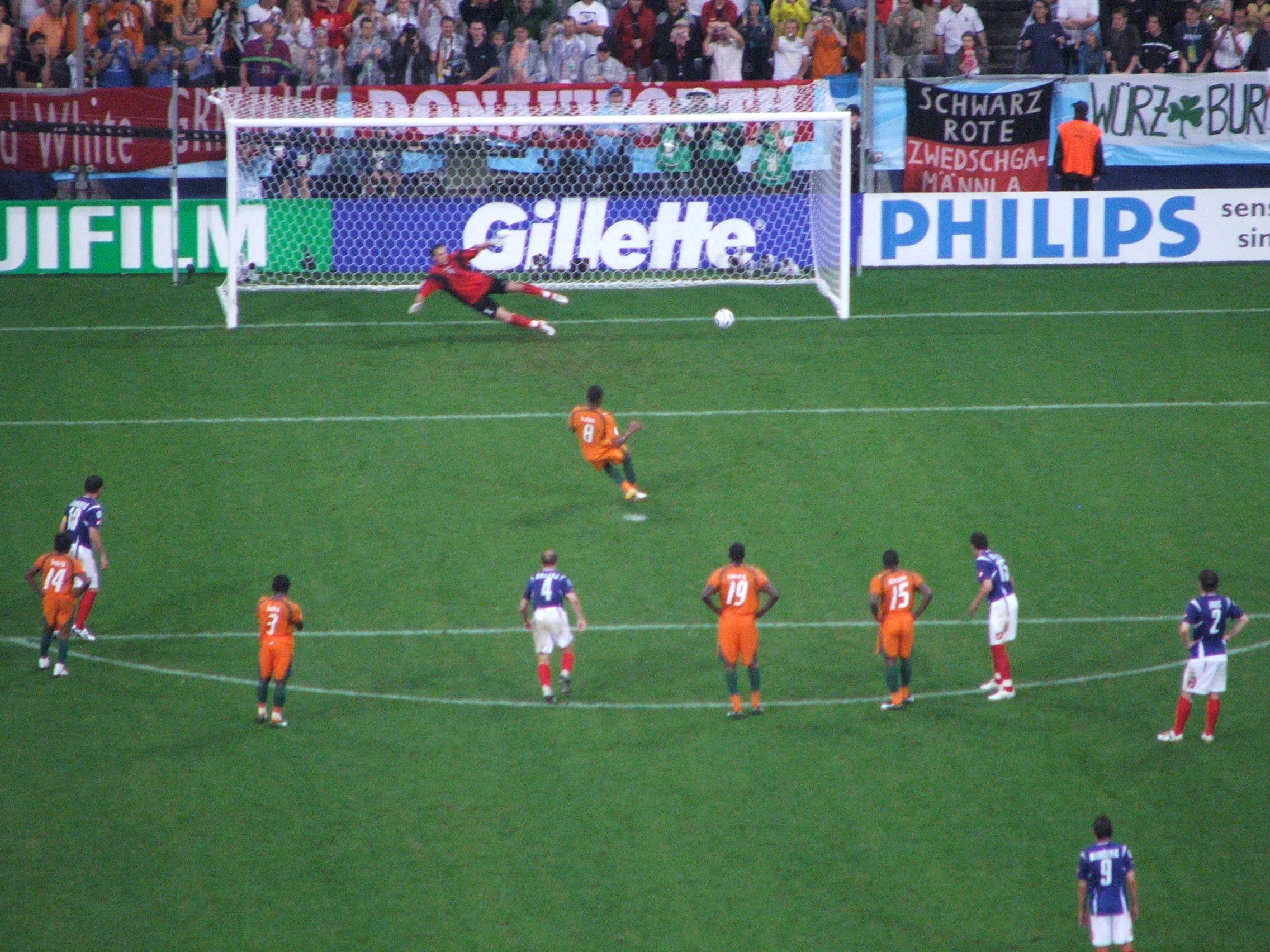
Bonaventure Kalou scores a penalty kick against Serbia and Montenegro to seal Ivory Coast's first-ever victory

Group C

Team	Pld	W	D	L	GF	GA	GD	Pts
Argentina	3	2	1	0	8	1	+7	7
Netherlands	3	2	1	0	3	1	+2	7
Ivory Coast	3	1	0	2	5	6	−1	3
Serbia and Montenegro	3	0	0	3	2	10	−8	0

10 June 2006
21:00

Argentina	2–1	Ivory Coast
Crespo 24'; Saviola 38'	(Report)	Drogba 82'

FIFA WM Stadion Hamburg, Hamburg
Attendance: 49,480
Referee: Frank De Bleeckere (Belgium)

16 June 2006
18:00

Netherlands	2–1	Ivory Coast
van Persie 23' van Nistelrooy 27'	(Report)	B. Koné 39'

Gottlieb-Daimler-Stadion, Stuttgart
Attendance: 52,000
Referee: Óscar Ruiz (Colombia)

21 June 2006
21:00

Ivory Coast	3–2	Serbia and Montenegro
Dindane 37' (pen.), 67'; Kalou 86' (pen.)	(Report)	Žigić 10'; Ilić 20'

FIFA WM Stadion München, Munich
Attendance: 66,000
Referee: Marco Rodríguez (Mexico)

=== Côte d'Ivoire at the 2010 FIFA World Cup ===
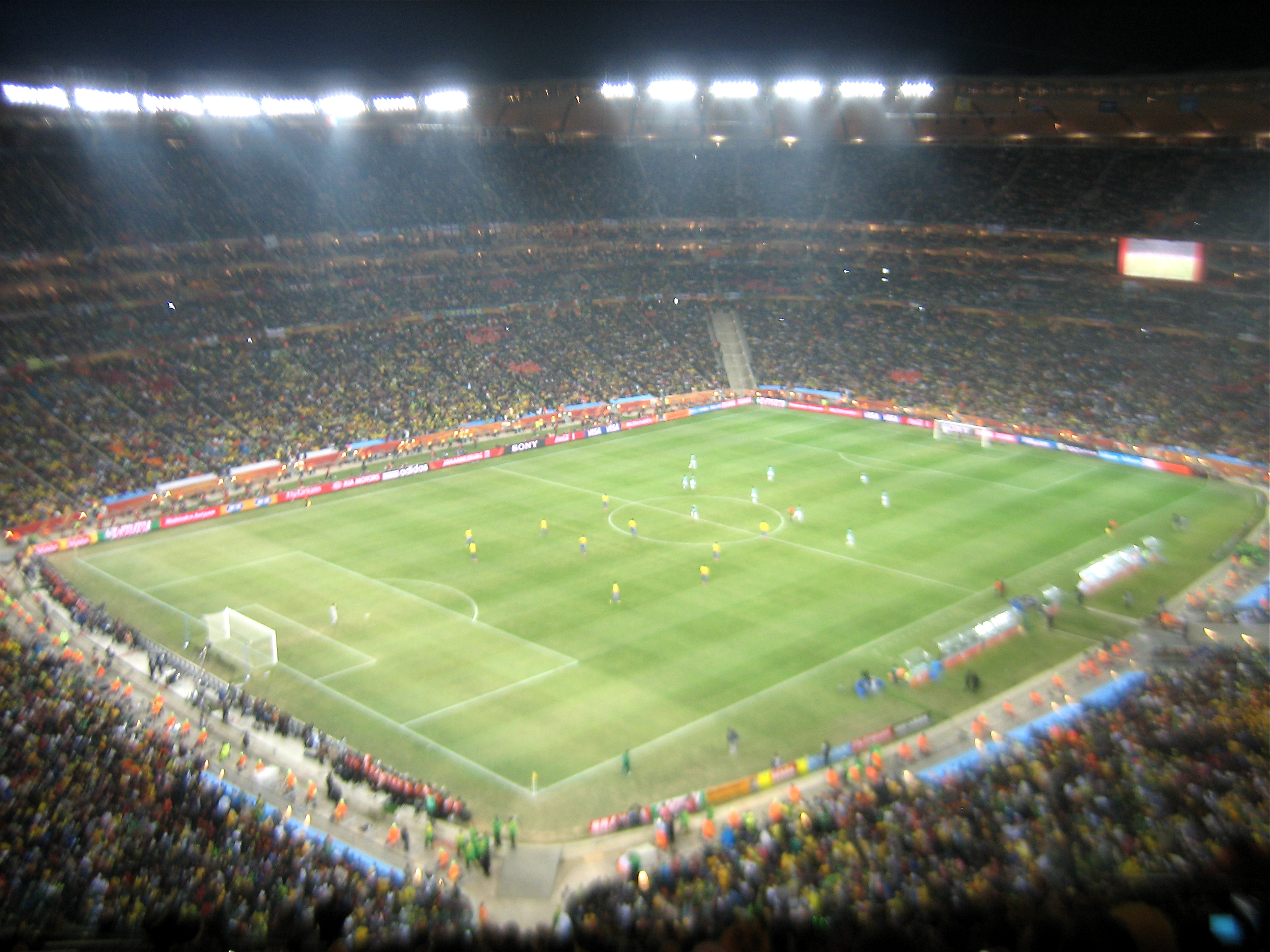
Ivory Coast facing Brazil

Group G

Pos	Team	Pld	W	D	L	GF	GA	GD	Pts	Qualification
1	Brazil	3	2	1	0	5	2	+3	7	Advance to knockout stage
2	Portugal	3	1	2	0	7	0	+7	5	Advance to knockout stage
3	Ivory Coast	3	1	1	1	4	3	+1	4	
4	North Korea	3	0	0	3	1	12	−11	0	

Source: FIFA
Rules for classification: Tie-breaking criteria
15 June 2010
16:00

Ivory Coast	0–0	Portugal
	Report

Nelson Mandela Bay Stadium, Port Elizabeth
Attendance: 37,034
Referee: Jorge Larrionda (Uruguay)

20 June 2010
20:30

Brazil	3–1	Ivory Coast
Luís Fabiano 25', 50'; Elano 62'	Report	Drogba 79'

Soccer City, Johannesburg
Attendance: 84,455
Referee: Stéphane Lannoy (France)

25 June 2010
16:00

North Korea	0–3	Ivory Coast
	Report	Y. Touré 14'; Romaric 20'; Kalou 82'

Mbombela Stadium, Nelspruit
Attendance: 34,763
Referee: Alberto Undiano Mallenco (Spain)

=== Côte d'Ivoire at the 2014 FIFA World Cup ===
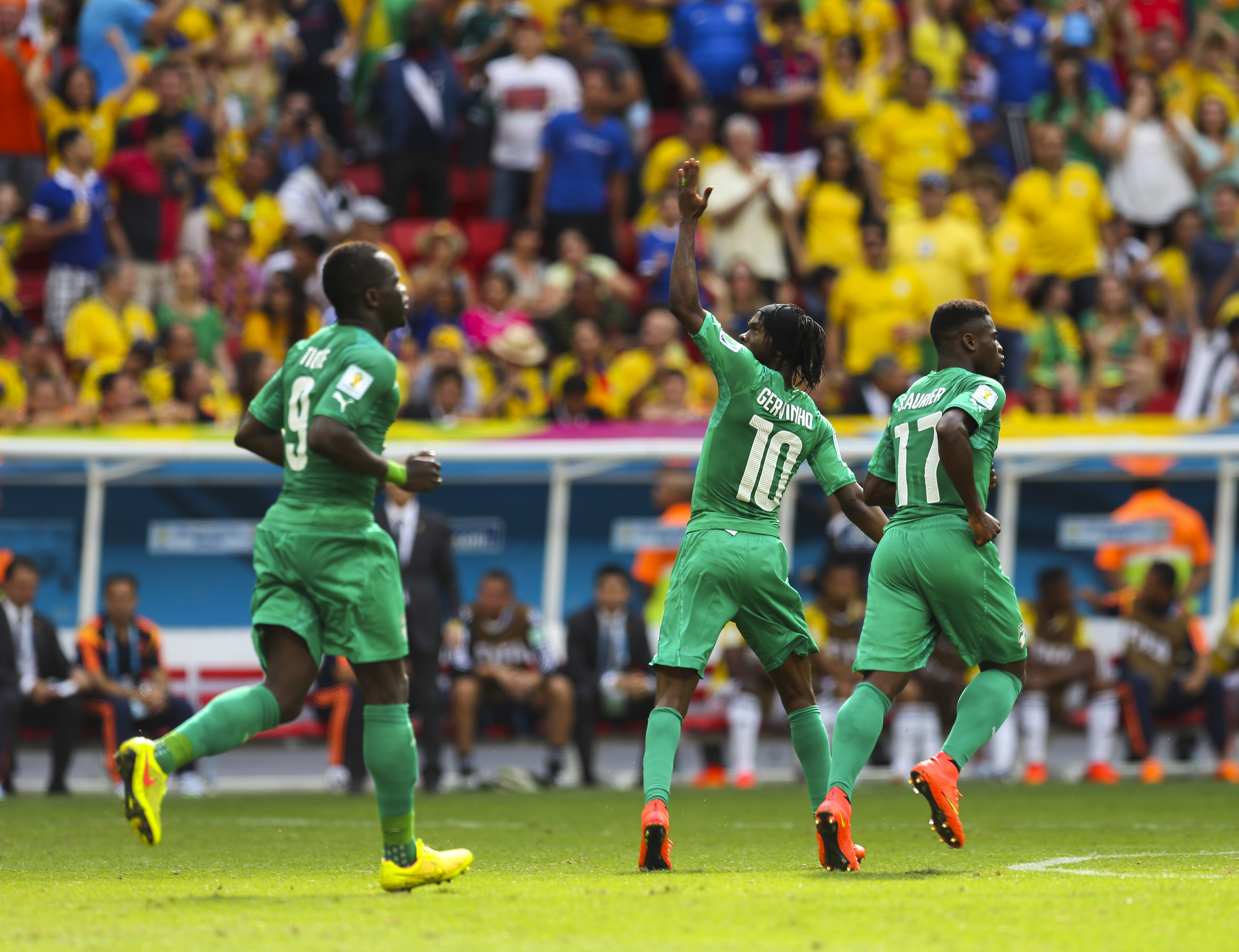
Ivorian players after Gervinho (center) scored against Colombia

Group C

Pos	Team	Pld	W	D	L	GF	GA	GD	Pts	Qualification
1	Colombia	3	3	0	0	9	2	+7	9	Advance to knockout stage
2	Greece	3	1	1	1	2	4	−2	4	Advance to knockout stage
3	Ivory Coast	3	1	0	2	4	5	−1	3	
4	Japan	3	0	1	2	2	6	−4	1	

Source: FIFA
Rules for classification: Tie-breaking criteria
14 June 2014
22:00 UTC−3

Ivory Coast	2–1	Japan
Bony 64'; Gervinho 66'	Report	Honda 16'

Arena Pernambuco, Recife
Attendance: 40,267
Referee: Enrique Osses (Chile)

19 June 2014
13:00 UTC−3

Colombia	2–1	Ivory Coast
Rodríguez 64'; Quintero 70'	Report	Gervinho 73'

Estádio Nacional Mané Garrincha, Brasília
Attendance: 68,748
Referee: Howard Webb (England)

24 June 2014
17:00 UTC−3

Greece	2–1	Ivory Coast
Samaris 42'; Samaras 90+3' (pen.)	Report	Bony 74'

Estádio Castelão, Fortaleza
Attendance: 59,095
Referee: Carlos Vera (Ecuador)

=== Côte d'Ivoire at the 2026 FIFA World Cup ===
Group E

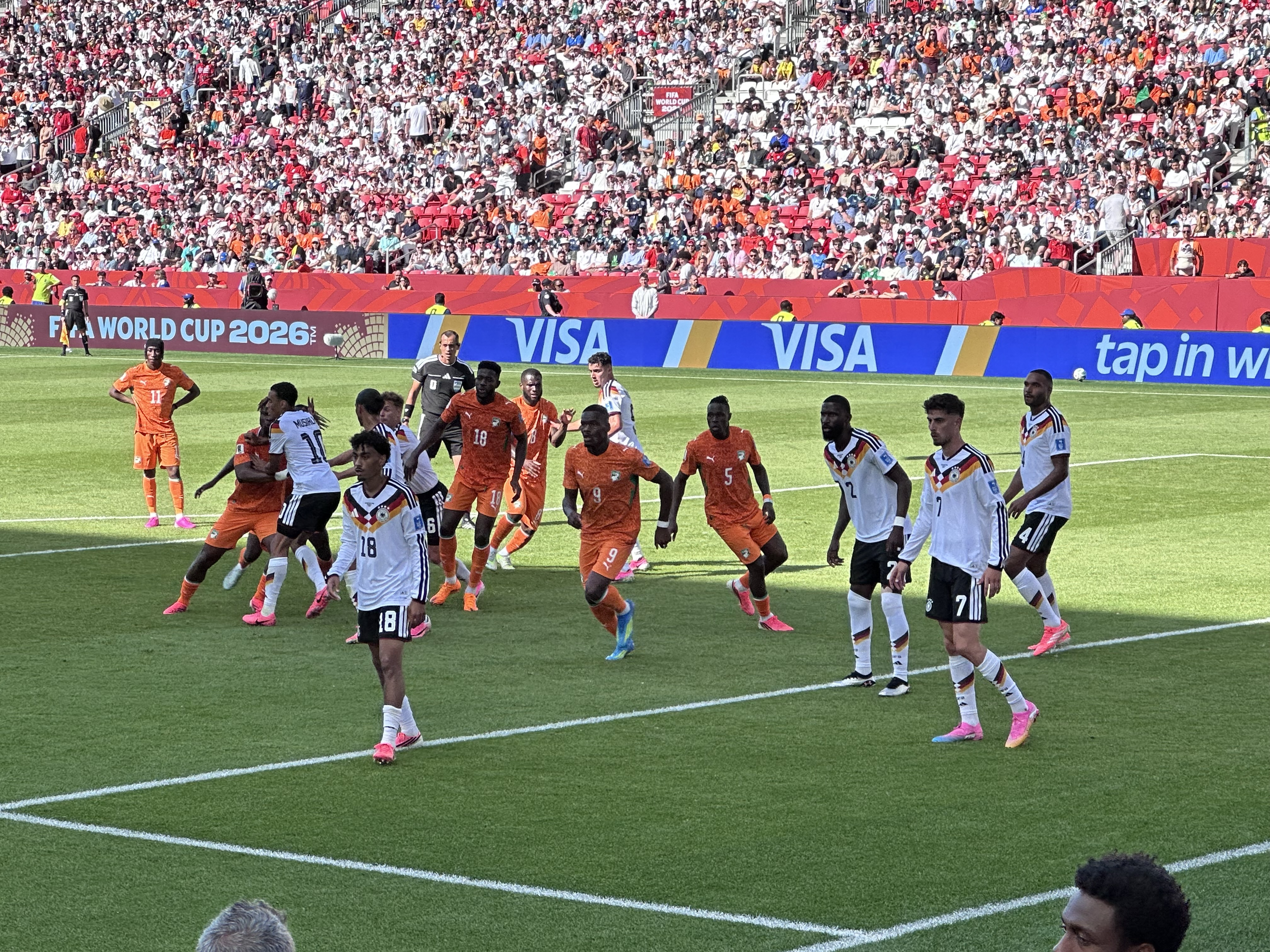
Germany vs Ivory Coast

Pos	Team	Pld	W	D	L	GF	GA	GD	Pts	Qualification
1	Germany	3	2	0	1	10	4	+6	6 (Note: Head-to-head result: Germany 2–1 Ivory Coast.)	Advance to knockout stage
2	Ivory Coast	3	2	0	1	4	2	+2	6	Advance to knockout stage
3	Ecuador	3	1	1	1	2	2	0	4	Advance to knockout stage
4	Curaçao	3	0	1	2	1	9	−8	1	

Source: FIFA
Notes:
June 14, 2026
7:00 p.m. UTC−4

Ivory Coast	1–0	Ecuador
Diallo 90'	(Note: "Côte d'Ivoire vs Ecuador | First Stage | FIFA World Cup 2026". FIFA. Retrieved June 14, 2026.; "Match Report – Group E – Côte d'Ivoire v. Ecuador". FIFA. June 15, 2026. Retrieved June 15, 2026.; "Post match summary report – Group E – Côte d'Ivoire v. Ecuador". FIFA. June 14, 2026. Retrieved June 15, 2026.)

Lincoln Financial Field, Philadelphia
Attendance: 68,274
Referee: François Letexier (France) (Note: Michael Oliver (England) was originally appointed to the Ivory Coast vs Ecuador match, but he pulled out due to a minor injury.)

June 20, 2026
4:00 p.m. UTC−4

Germany	2–1	Ivory Coast
Undav 68', 90+4'	(Note: "Germany vs Côte d'Ivoire | First Stage | FIFA World Cup 2026". FIFA. Retrieved June 20, 2026.; "Match Report – Group E – Germany v. Côte d'Ivoire". FIFA. June 20, 2026. Retrieved June 20, 2026.; "Post match summary report – Group E – Germany v. Côte d'Ivoire". FIFA. June 20, 2026. Retrieved June 20, 2026.)	Kessié 30'

BMO Field, Toronto
Attendance: 43,036
Referee: Juan Gabriel Benítez (Paraguay)

June 25, 2026
4:00 p.m. UTC−4

Curaçao	0–2	Ivory Coast
	(Note: "Curaçao vs Côte d'Ivoire | First Stage | FIFA World Cup 2026". FIFA. Retrieved June 25, 2026.; "Match Report – Group E – Curaçao v. Côte d'Ivoire". FIFA. June 25, 2026. Retrieved June 25, 2026.; "Post match summary report – Group E – Curaçao v. Côte d'Ivoire". FIFA. June 25, 2026. Retrieved June 27, 2026.)	Pépé 7', 64'

Lincoln Financial Field, Philadelphia
Attendance: 68,324
Referee: Glenn Nyberg (Sweden)

Knockout stage

Round of 32

June 30, 2026
12:00 p.m. UTC−5

Ivory Coast	1–2	Norway
Diallo 74'	(Note: "Côte d'Ivoire vs Norway | Round of 32 | FIFA World Cup 2026". FIFA. Retrieved June 30, 2026.; "Match Report – Round of 32 – Côte d'Ivoire v. Norway". FIFA. June 30, 2026. Retrieved June 30, 2026.; "Post match summary report – Round of 32 – Côte d'Ivoire vs. Norway". FIFA. July 1, 2026. Retrieved July 1, 2026.)	Nusa 39'; Haaland 86'

AT&T Stadium, Arlington
Attendance: 69,665
Referee: Jesús Valenzuela (Venezuela)

== Head-to-head record ==
Opponent	Pld	W	D	L	GF	GA	GD	Win %
Argentina	1	0	0	1	1	2	−1	0.00
Brazil	1	0	0	1	1	3	−2	0.00
Colombia	1	0	0	1	1	2	−1	0.00
Curaçao	1	1	0	0	2	0	+2	100.00
Ecuador	1	1	0	0	1	0	+1	100.00
Greece	1	0	0	1	1	2	−1	0.00
Germany	1	0	0	1	1	2	−1	0.00
Japan	1	1	0	0	2	1	+1	100.00
Netherlands	1	0	0	1	1	2	−1	0.00
North Korea	1	1	0	0	3	0	+3	100.00
Norway	1	0	0	1	1	2	−1	0.00
Portugal	1	0	1	0	0	0	+0	0.00
Serbia and Montenegro	1	1	0	0	3	2	+1	100.00
Total	12	5	1	6	17	16	+1	41.67

== Player records ==
=== Most appearances ===
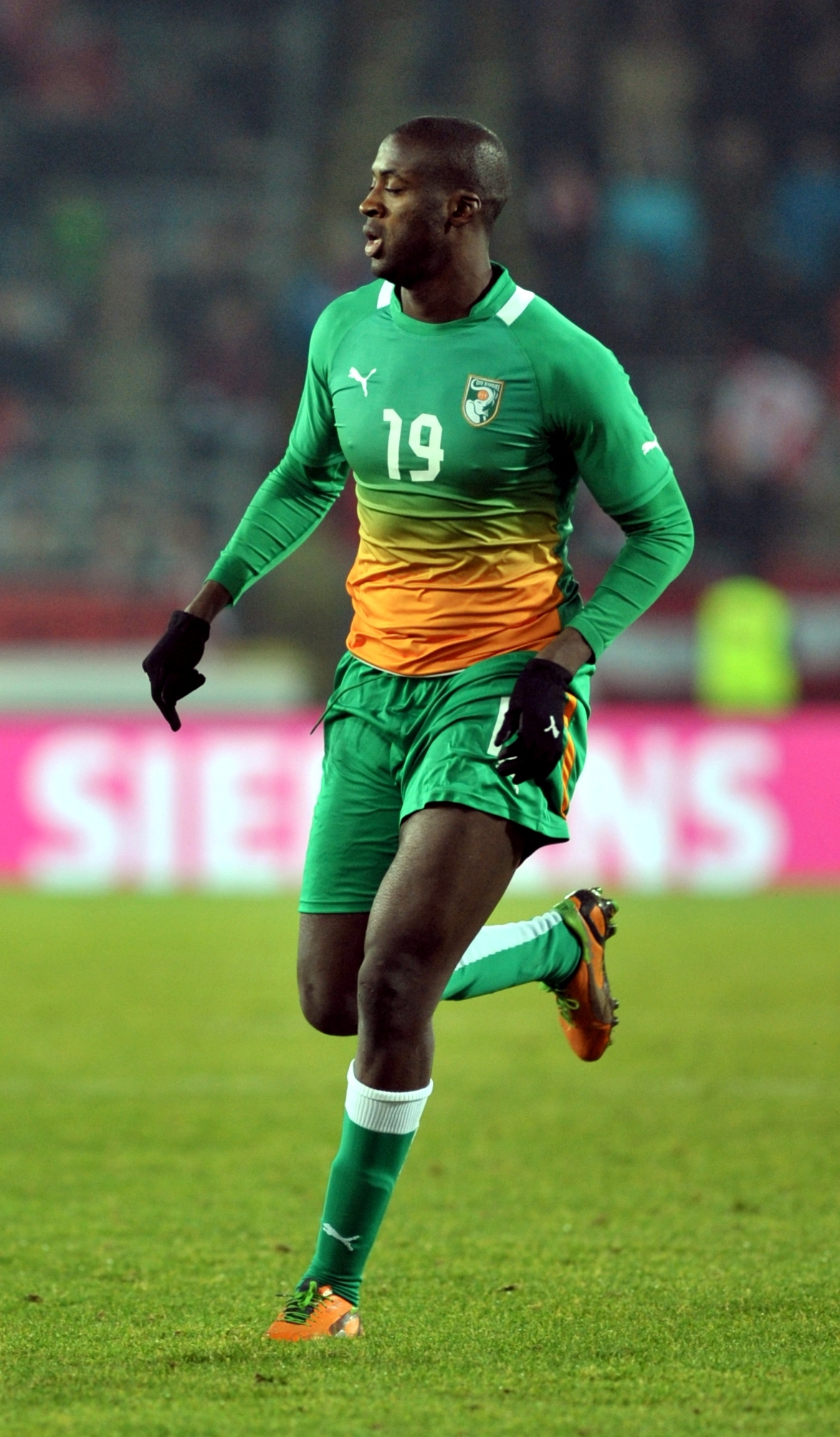
Yaya Touré holds the national record for most FIFA World Cup matches played

Yaya Touré was the only Ivorian player to feature in all nine of the nation's World Cup matches from 2006 to 2014, giving him the sole appearance record at the tournament for his country.

Rank	Player	Matches	World Cups
1	Yaya Touré	9	2006, 2010 and 2014
2	Didier Drogba	8	2006, 2010 and 2014
2	Didier Zokora	8	2006, 2010 and 2014
4	Boubacar Barry	7	2006, 2010 and 2014
4	Arthur Boka	7	2006, 2010 and 2014
6	Aruna Dindane	6	2006 and 2010
6	Emmanuel Eboué	6	2006 and 2010
6	Kolo Touré	6	2006, 2010 and 2014
6	Gervinho	6	2010 and 2014
6	Salomon Kalou	6	2010 and 2014
6	Cheick Tioté	6	2010 and 2014

=== Goalscorers ===
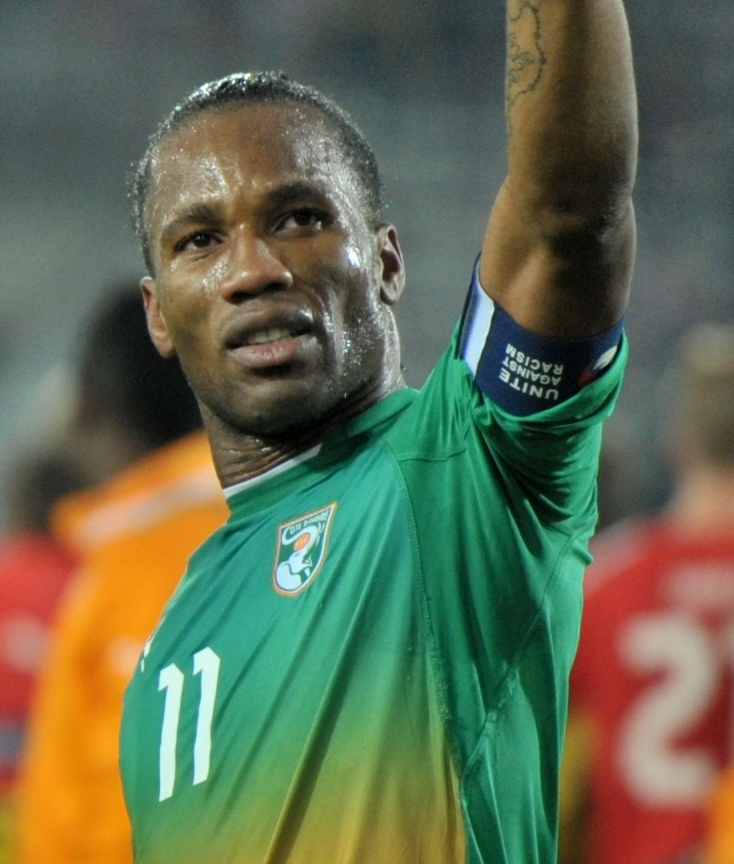
Didier Drogba

On June 10th 2006, during the opening group stage match against Argentina, Didier Drogba made history by scoring Ivory Coast's first-ever FIFA World Cup goal in Hamburg.

Player	Goals	2006	2010	2014	2026
Aruna Dindane	2	2			
Didier Drogba	2	1	1		
Gervinho	2			2	
Wilfried Bony	2			2	
Nicolas Pépé	2				2
Amad Diallo	2				2
Bakari Koné	1	1			
Bonaventure Kalou	1	1			
Yaya Touré	1		1		
Romaric	1		1		
Salomon Kalou	1		1		
Franck Kessié	1				1
Total	18	5	4	4	5

== See also ==
- African nations at the FIFA World Cup
- Ivory Coast at the Africa Cup of Nations
