= 1965 African Cup of Nations =

5th edition of the Africa Cup of Nations

كأس الأمم الإفريقية 1965 Coupe d'Afrique des Nations 1965

Tournament details
- Host country: Tunisia
- Dates: 12–21 November
- Teams: 6
- Venues: 4 (in 4 host cities)

Final positions
- Champions: Ghana (2nd title)
- Runners-up: Tunisia
- Third place: Ivory Coast
- Fourth place: Senegal

Tournament statistics
- Matches played: 8
- Goals scored: 31 (3.88 per match)
- Top scorer(s): (Ghana) Ben Acheampong (Ghana) Osei Kofi (Ivory Coast) Eustache Manglé (3 goals each)
- Best player: (Ghana) Osei Kofi

The 1965 African Cup of Nations was the fifth edition of the African Cup of Nations, the biennial African association football tournament organised by the Confederation of African Football (CAF). It was hosted by Tunisia from 12 to 21 November 1965. This was the final edition of the tournament to be held in an odd-numbered year until 2013.

The growing enthusiasm for the competition and the increasing number of participating teams led to an increase in the number of participants in the tournament, which rose from four to six teams. Two sides qualified automatically: the host country Tunisia and the defending champions Ghana. A first round was determined by two groups of three teams, then the final (for the top teams in each group) and a third-place match for the teams that finished second.

Ethiopia was the only team to have participated in every edition of the African Cup of Nations since its inception. Egypt (twice winner in 1957 and 1959) refused to participate due to the diplomatic crisis with Tunisia. Sudan also failed to qualify after stumbling in the qualifiers. Congo-Léopoldville, Senegal and Ivory Coast participated in the finals for the first time.

Ghana retained its title, beating hosts Tunisia in the final 3–2 after extra time. This was Ghana's second African title in two participations.

== Teams ==
Four places were available to the thirteen countries participating in these qualifications. Tunisia, the tournament organizer, and Ghana, the defending champion, qualified automatically. Egypt qualified from Zone 1 after Morocco and Nigeria withdrew before the start of the qualifiers, but later withdrew due to the deterioration of its diplomatic relations with Tunisia after a speech given by Tunisian President Habib Bourguiba in Jericho in which he called on Arab countries to recognize Israel.

Sudan, called upon to take Egypt's place, declined the invitation: a single playoff match was then scheduled in Accra on 31 October between Congo-Léopoldville and Guinea. However, Guinea withdrew shortly before this date; therefore, the playoff was scratched and Congo-Léopoldville qualified.

=== Qualified teams ===
Team	Method of qualification	Date of qualification	Finals appearance	Last appearance	Previous appearances in tournament (Note: Bold indicates champion for that year, Italic indicates host.)
Tunisia	Hosts		3rd	1963	2 (1962, 1963)
Ghana	Holders	1 December 1963	2nd	1963	1 (**1963**)
Ethiopia	1st round winners	18 April 1965	5th	1963	4 (1957, 1959, **1962**, 1963)
Senegal	1st round winners	5 May 1965	1st	None	0 (debut)
Ivory Coast	1st round winners	5 September 1965	1st	None	0 (debut)
Congo-Léopoldville	1st round winners	31 October 1965	1st	None	0 (debut)

== Venues ==
Tunis	1965 African Cup of Nations is located in Tunisia	Sfax
Chedly Zouiten Stadium	1965 African Cup of Nations is located in Tunisia	Taieb Mhiri Stadium
Capacity: 20,000	1965 African Cup of Nations is located in Tunisia	Capacity: 11,000
Sousse	1965 African Cup of Nations is located in Tunisia	Bizerte
Bou Ali Lahouar Stadium	1965 African Cup of Nations is located in Tunisia	Stade Ahmed Bsiri
Capacity: 6,500	1965 African Cup of Nations is located in Tunisia	Capacity: 2,000

== Group stage ==
=== Tiebreakers ===
If two or more teams finished level on points after completion of the group matches, the following tie-breakers were used to determine the final ranking:

1. Goal average in all group matches
2. Drawing of lots

=== Group A ===
Pos	Team	Pld	W	D	L	GF	GA	GAv	Pts	Qualification
1	Tunisia (H)	2	1	1	0	4	0	—	3 (Note: Tunisia progress on goal average.)	Advance to final
2	Senegal	2	1	1	0	5	1	5.000	3	Advance to third place play-off
3	Ethiopia	2	0	0	2	1	9	0.111	0	

Rules for classification: Group stage tiebreakers
(H) Hosts
Notes:
12 November 1965

Tunisia	4–0	Ethiopia
Chaïbi 32'; Jedidi 62'; Delhoum 80'; Lahmar 84'

Chedly Zouiten Stadium, Tunis

14 November 1965

Senegal	0–0	Tunisia

Chedly Zouiten Stadium, Tunis

19 November 1965

Senegal	5–1	Ethiopia
Camara 3', 52'; Guèye 37'; Niang 48', 53'		Vassallo 12' (pen.)

Chedly Zouiten Stadium, Tunis

=== Group B ===
Pos	Team	Pld	W	D	L	GF	GA	GAv	Pts	Qualification
1	Ghana	2	2	0	0	9	3	3.000	4	Advance to final
2	Ivory Coast	2	1	0	1	4	4	1.000	2	Advance to third place play-off
3	Congo-Léopoldville	2	0	0	2	2	8	0.250	0	

Rules for classification: Group stage tiebreakers
12 November 1965

Ghana	5–2	Congo-Léopoldville
Kofi 13'; Acheampong 18', 59'; Attuquayefio 84', 89'		Kalala Mukendi 43', 45' (pen.)

Bou Ali Lahouar Stadium, Sousse

14 November 1965

Ivory Coast	3–0	Congo-Léopoldville
Manglé 14', 59', 80'

Taieb Mhiri Stadium, Sfax

19 November 1965

Ghana	4–1	Ivory Coast
Acheampong 20'; Nti 43'; Lutterodt 52'; Kofi 70'		Bléziri 66'

Stade Ahmed Bsiri, Bizerte

== Knockout stage ==
=== Third place match ===
21 November 1965

Senegal	0–1	Ivory Coast
		Yoboué 35'

Chedly Zouiten Stadium, Tunis
Referee: Mohamed Mezahi (Algeria)

=== Final ===
21 November 1965

Ghana	3–2 (a.e.t.)	Tunisia
Odoi 37', 96'; Kofi 79'		Chetali 47'; Chaïbi 67'

Chedly Zouiten Stadium, Tunis
Attendance: 16,000
Referee: Abdelaziz Chekaïmi (Algeria)

GK	1	John Bortey Naawu
DF	6	Willie Evans
DF	3	Charles Addo Odametey (c)
DF	8	Sam Acquah
DF	16	Ben Kusi
MF	7	Oman Mensah
MF	11	Kofi Pare
MF	17	Kwame Nti
FW	10	Cecil Jones Attuquayefio
FW	14	Osei Kofi
MF	15	Frank Odoi
Substitutions:
	–
Manager:
Charles Gyamfi

GK	1	Sadok Sassi
DF	2	Mahfoudh Benzarti
DF	3	Hédi Douiri
DF	4	Mohsen Habacha
MF	5	Ahmed Lamine
MF	6	Abdelmajid Chetali (c)
MF	8	Tahar Chaïbi
MF	16	Moncef Ajel
FW	7	Aleya Sassi
FW	9	Rachid Gribaâ	Substituted off
FW	12	Salah Jedidi
Substitutions:
FW	–	Abdelwahab Lahmar	Substituted on
Manager:
Mokhtar Ben Nacef

== Goalscorers ==
There were 31 goals scored in 8 matches, for an average of 3.88 goals per match.

3 goals

- (Ivory Coast) Eustache Manglé
- (Ghana) Ben Acheampong
- (Ghana) Osei Kofi

2 goals

- (Democratic Republic of the Congo) Pierre Kalala Mukendi
- (Ghana) Cecil Jones Attuquayefio
- (Ghana) Frank Odoi
- (Senegal) Louis Camara
- (Senegal) Matar Niang
- (Tunisia) Tahar Chaïbi

1 goal

- (Ivory Coast) Joseph Bléziri
- (Ivory Coast) Konan Yoboué
- (Ethiopia) Luciano Vassallo
- (Ghana) Paa Nii Lutterodt
- (Ghana) Kwame Nti
- (Senegal) Oumar Samb Guèye
- (Tunisia) Abdelmajid Chetali
- (Tunisia) Mongi Delhoum
- (Tunisia) Mohamed Salah Jedidi
- (Tunisia) Abdelwahab Lahmar

== Tournament rankings ==
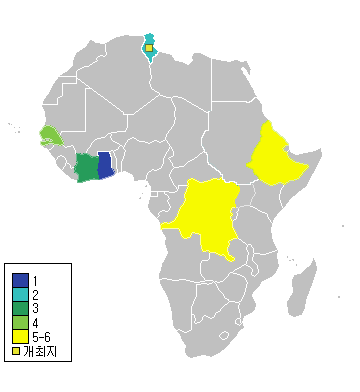
Result of teams participating in 1965 Africa Cup of Nations: Champion Runner-up Third place / Fourth place Group stage

Pos	Team	Pld	W	D	L	GF	GA	GD	Pts	Final result
1	Ghana	3	3	0	0	12	5	+7	9	Champions
2	Tunisia (H)	3	1	1	1	6	3	+3	4	Runners-up
3	Ivory Coast	3	2	0	1	5	4	+1	6	Third place
4	Senegal	3	1	1	1	5	2	+3	4	Fourth place
5	Congo-Léopoldville	2	0	0	2	2	8	−6	0	Eliminated in the group stage
6	Ethiopia	2	0	0	2	1	3	−2	0	Eliminated in the group stage

Source: RSSSF
(H) Hosts
