= Ngoie =

Ngoie is a surname. Notable people with the surname include:

- Enoch Numbi Ngoie (fl. from 2007), Congolese major general
- Kafula Ngoie (born 1945), Congolese football player
