= Cecil Jones Attuquayefio =

Ghanaian football player and manager (1944–2015)

Personal information
- Full name: Cecil Jones Attuquayefio
- Date of birth: 18 October 1944
- Place of birth: Accra, Ghana
- Date of death: 12 May 2015 (aged 70)
- Place of death: Korle Bu Teaching Hospital, Accra, Ghana
- Height: 1.67 m (5 ft 6 in)
- Position: Forward

Youth career
- 1962–1965: Ghana Academicals

Senior career*
Years	Team	Apps	(Gls)
1962–1963	Accra Standfast F.C.		
1963–1965	Real Republicans		
1966–1974	Great Olympics		

International career
1965–1974	Ghana		

Managerial career
- 1974–1984: Great Olympics
- 1982–1984: GFA (Vice-President)
- 1985–1987: Ghana (assistant coach)
- 1988–1989: Okwawu United
- 1989–1990: Stade Abidjan
- 1990–1993: Goldfields Obuasi
- 1993–1995: Goldfields Academy
- 1995–1997: GFA (General Secretary)
- 1996: Ghana U-23 (assistant coach)
- 1998–1999: Ghana U-17
- 1998–2001: Hearts of Oak
- 2000–2001: Ghana
- 2002: Liberty Professionals F.C.
- 2003–2004: Benin
- 2004–: Liberty Professionals F.C. (Technical Director)
- 2006–2015: Ghana (scout)
- 2007–2009: Ghana (Ministry of Sport)
- * Club domestic league appearances and goals

Cecil Jones Attuquayefio (18 October 1944 – 12 May 2015) was a Ghanaian football player and coach.

== International career ==
Attuquayefio played many times for the Ghana national team and helped the team win the 1965 African Nations Cup.

== Coaching career ==
Attuquayefio managed the Benin national team to the 2004 African Nations Cup, Hearts of Oak to the 2000 African Champions League title and the 2004 CAF Confederation Cup. He also managed Ghana's national team. In 2008–09 Attuquayefio coached Liberty Professionals F.C. and became the title coach of the Century.

Attuquayefio was named African coach of the year in 2000 after his club Accra Hearts of Oak of Ghana won the African Champions league with only one loss throughout the entire tournament (to DC Motema Pembe).

In 2015, Jones Attuquayefio died in the early hours of 12 May 2015 at the Korle Bu Teaching Hospital in Accra, Ghana's capital, from throat cancer.
