= Samuel Yaw =

Ghanaian footballer

Personal information
- Date of birth: 2 February 1945 (age 81)
- Position: Midfielder

International career
Years	Team	Apps	(Gls)
- Ghana

Samuel Yaw (born 2 February 1945) is a Ghanaian footballer. He competed in the men's tournament at the 1972 Summer Olympics.
