= Pombi Litinda =

Congolese footballer

Personal information
- Full name: Louis Pombi Litinda
- Place of birth: Belgian Congo
- Position: Goalkeeper

Senior career*
Years	Team	Apps	(Gls)
197?-	AS Vita Club		

International career
?–1979	Zaire		
- * Club domestic league appearances and goals

Louis Pombi Litinda is a Congolese retired footballer. A goalkeeper, he represented Zaire in international competition, including at the 1972 Africa Cup of Nations in Cameroon. He appeared in one match in the tournament, a 5–2 loss to Cameroon in the third place match. He was also a member of the Zairian squad in a 1971 tour of the Netherlands and Belgium.

In the 1970s, Pombi played for AS Vita Club.

Pombi represented Zaire in international competition as late as 1979, appearing in a 1980 African Cup of Nations qualifying match versus Guinea in Kinshasa.
