= Ahmed Bsiri Stadium =

Sports venue in Bizerte, Tunisia

Coordinates: 37°16′24″N 9°52′01″E

- Interactive map of Ahmed Bsiri Stadium
- Full name: Stade Ahmed Bsiri
- Location: Bizerte, Tunisia
- Capacity: 2,000
- Surface: Grass

Tenant
- CA Bizertin (until 1985)

Ahmed Bsiri Stadium is a stadium in Bizerte, Tunisia. It has a capacity of 2,000 spectators. It was the home of Club Athlétique Bizertin of the Tunisian Ligue Professionnelle 1 until Stade 15 Octobre opened in 1985. During the 1965 Africa Cup of Nations, it hosted one match.
