= Paa Nii Lutterodt =

Ghanaian footballer

Personal information
- Full name: Nicholas Halm-Lutterodt
- Date of birth: 1937–38
- Date of death: 18 July 2006
- Place of death: Newark, New Jersey
- Position: Defender

Senior career*
Years	Team	Apps	(Gls)
- Great Olympics
- Kumasi Asante Kotoko

International career
- Ghana
- * Club domestic league appearances and goals

Nicholas Halm-Lutterodt, better known as Paa Nii Lutterodt (1937/38 – 18 July 2006) is a former Ghanaian international football player. He was nicknamed "The Fox".

He won the 1965 Africa Cup of Nations title with Ghana, and scored in the group match against Ivory Coast.

He died after a short illness in the Beth Israel Medical Center in Newark, New Jersey. He was buried in Osu, Ghana.
