= Lawal Murtadah Oladipupo =

Nigerian footballer

Personal information
- Full name: Lawal Murtadah Oladipupo
- Date of birth: 15 March 1995
- Place of birth: Lagos, Nigeria
- Height: 1.86 m (6 ft 1 in)
- Position: Centre back

Team information
- Current team: Attack Energy
- Number: 2

Youth career
- 2011–2012: Babanawa
- 2012–2013: Patrick Ovie
- 2013: New Generation Football Academy

Senior career*
Years	Team	Apps	(Gls)
2014–2015	Taraba	8	(2)
2015–2016	Çetinkaya	19	(3)
2016–2019	Baf Ülkü Yurdu	64	(3)
2019–2020	Göcmenköy IYSK	33	(1)
2022	Sunshine Stars	1	
- * Club domestic league appearances and goals

Lawal Murtadah Oladipupo (born 15 March 1995) is a Nigerian footballer who currently play as centre back for Attack Energy in Afghanistan.

== Club career ==
Oladipupoh has played for no less than four Nigerian clubs, he started with Babanawa, Patrick Ovie and later New Generation Football Academy, in the summer of 2014 he joined to Jalingo-based Nigeria Professional League club Taraba

He moved to Northern Cyprus where he played at Çetinkaya 2015–2016, Baf Ülkü Yurdu 2016-2017 and Göcmenköy IYSK 2019.
