= Lawal =

- Gender: Male
- Language: Hausa

Origin
- Origin: Nigerian
- Meaning: First
- Region of origin: Northern-Nigerian and Yorubaland

Other names
- Related names: Awwal
- See also: Lawali

Lawal is a Nigerian masculine name of Hausa and Yoruba origin, derived from the Arabic word أوّل (ʾawwal) meaning "first". It is sometimes added to the name of the first of multiple siblings who share the same given name. Lawali is a diminutive form of the name. Notable people with the surname include:

- Abass Lawal (born 1980), Nigerian footballer
- Adekunle Lawal (1934–1980), Nigerian politician
- Adeshina Lawal (born 1984), Nigerian footballer
- Bosun Lawal
- Amina Lawal (born 1972), Nigerian woman sentenced to death
- Dauda Lawal (born 1965), Nigerian politician and banker
- Gani Lawal (born 1988), American basketball player
- Garba Lawal (born 1974), Nigerian footballer
- Hassan Muhammed Lawal (1954–2018), Nigerian politician
- Mudashiru Lawal (1954–1991), Nigerian footballer
- Muhammed Lawal (born 1981), American mixed martial artist and wrestler
- Tobi Lawal (born 2003), English basketball player
- Tobias Lawal (born 2000), Austrian footballer

== See also ==
- Lawal (given name)
