= Oliver Acquah =

Ghanaian footballer

Personal information
- Nationality: Ghanaian
- Born: 22 March 1946 (age 79); Accra, Ghana
- Height: 1.77 m (5 ft 10 in)
- Weight: 82 kg (181 lb)

Sport
- Sport: Football

Oliver Acquah (born 22 March 1946) is a Ghanaian footballer. He competed in the 1968 and 1972 Summer Olympics.
