= Azie =

Azie is an American unisex given name. Notable people with the name include:

- Azie Faison (born 1964), American drug dealer
- Azie Taylor Morton (1936–2003), Treasurer of the United States
