= Babanawa F.C. =

Nigerian football club

- Dissolved: 2011
- Ground: Onikan Stadium
- Capacity: 10,000
- Owner: Col. Ahmadu Usman Suleiman
- League: Nigeria National League

Babanawa FC was a Nigerian National Division One football club, based in Anyigba, Kogi State and play their home games in Lokoja.

== Overview ==
They were owned by Col. Ahmadu Usman Suleiman (rtd), making them one of the few Nigerian teams not run by a state government. In 2003, they were relegated to the amateur league under "suspicious" circumstances involving player ineligibility, and took the NFL to court to protest, ultimately losing. The team was resurrected in 2005 after acquiring Globe Stars FC and elected to play their games at Onikan Stadium. In 2006 they played their home games in Gboko and Makurdi before returning to Kogi State for the 2007 season. They withdrew from the League in the 2011 season after not making their first three games.
