= Laurent Pokou =

Ivorian footballer

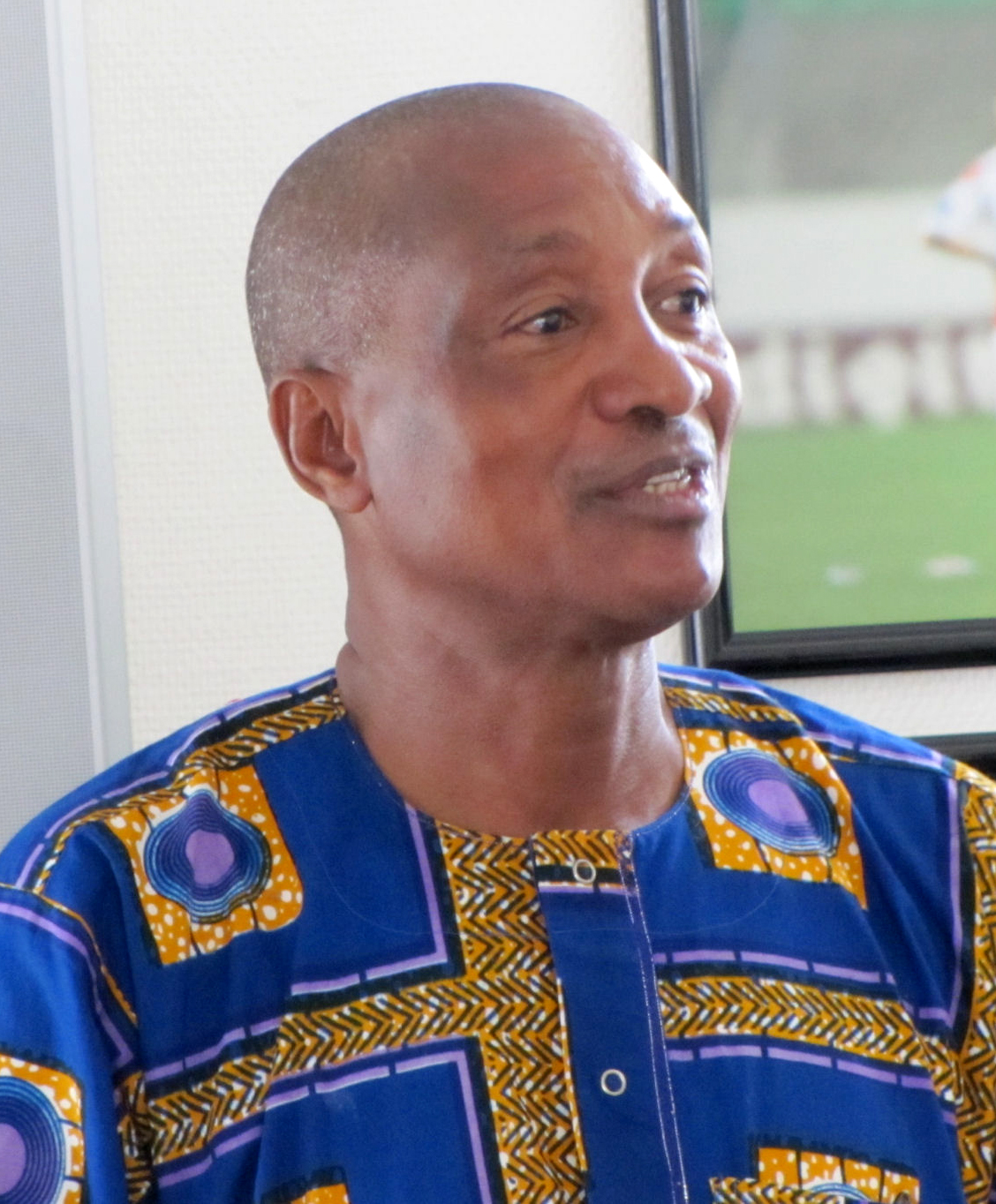
- Pokou in 2011

Personal information
- Full name: Laurent N'Dri Pokou
- Date of birth: 10 August 1947
- Place of birth: Abidjan, Ivory Coast
- Date of death: 13 November 2016 (aged 69)
- Place of death: Abidjan, Ivory Coast
- Height: 1.78 m (5 ft 10 in)
- Position: Striker

Senior career*
Years	Team	Apps	(Gls)
1966–1973	ASEC Abidjan		
1974–1977	Rennes	63	(44)
1977–1978	Nancy	19	(3)
1978–1979	Rennes	12	(6)
1979–1982	ASEC Abidjan		
1982–1983	RS Anyama		

International career
1967–1980	Ivory Coast	30	(21)
- * Club domestic league appearances and goals

Laurent N'Dri Pokou (10 August 1947 – 13 November 2016) was an Ivorian footballer who played as a striker. He notably played for French club Stade Rennais F.C.

== International career ==
Pokou was a member of the Ivory Coast national team, who was twice the highest goalscorer of the Africa Cup of Nations, scoring six goals in the 1968 tournament in Ethiopia and eight in the 1970 edition in Sudan, including five in one match against Ethiopia, which Ivory Coast won 6–1. This performance gave him his nickname L'homme d'Asmara (the man of Asmara). With 14 total goals, he is also the tournament's second highest overall goalscorer, behind Cameroon's Samuel Eto'o, who eclipsed Pokou's record in the 2008 ACN tournament.

On 23 October 2023, CAF and PUMA announced the official match ball for the 2023 Africa Cup of Nations, named "POKOU" in honor of Laurent Pokou. The ball, which features the colors of the Cote d'Ivoire flag and incorporates advanced technology, celebrates Pokou's legacy, including his record-breaking performance in the 1970 Africa Cup of Nations. Laurent Pokou's son, Erwan, presented the ball, expressing the family's honor and gratitude for this tribute to his late father's contributions to Ivorian football.

== Post-playing career ==
After retiring, Pokou briefly worked as a coach at ASEC Mimosas. He later went into the textile business and also worked at the Ivorian Football Federation.

After a long illness, he died on 13 November 2016, aged 69.

== Lauren Pokou Stadium ==
On 8 September 2023, the Laurent Pokou Stadium was officially inaugurated in San-Pédro. This new stadium was named in honor of Laurent Pokou. The inauguration ceremony was led by the Minister of Sport, Claude Paulin Danho, and was attended by the Chinese ambassador, representatives from the construction companies, members of the Laurent Pokou family, the organizing committee of the 2023 Africa Cup of Nations, and other senior officials.

On 9 September 2023, following its inauguration, the Laurent Pokou stadium hosted its first official game. This historic match was part of the 2023 Africa Cup of Nations qualification and witnessed the Ivory Coast national football team securing a 1–0 victory against Lesotho. This game was significant as it was the first national team match ever played in San-Pédro.
