= Osei Kofi =

Ghanaian footballer and priest

Personal information
- Full name: Nana Osei Kofi
- Date of birth: 3 June 1940 (age 86)
- Height: 1.71 m (5 ft 7 1/2 in)
- Position: Forward

Youth career
- 1954–1961: Asante Kotoko

Senior career*
| Years | Team | Apps | (Gls) |
| 1961–1962 | Hearts of Oak | 50 | (22) |
| 1962–1975 | Asante Kotoko | 340 | (151) |
| Total | | 390 | (173) |

International career
| 1964–1973 | Ghana | 25 | (19) |
- * Club domestic league appearances and goals

Osei Kofi (born 3 June 1940) is a retired Ghanaian footballer. He played for Asante Kotoko S.C. and the Ghana national football team. He was a joint top scorer in the 1965 Africa Cup of Nations tournament held in Tunis, Tunisia leading to Ghana winning the tournament for a second time. He was joint top goalscorer in 1965 Africa Cup of Nations and he was the third highest scorer in the 1968 Africa Cup of Nations. Osei Kofi was called the 'wizard dribbler' because of his ball dribbling skills.

Osei Kofi apparently turned down a financial incentive to play in Europe at his prime in 1969. He later became a priest.

He has also worked as the National Coordinator for National Games.

== Honours ==
Ghana

- Africa Cup of Nations winner: 1963, 1965

Asante Kotoko

- Ghana Premier League winner: 1964, 1965, 1967
