= 1974 FIFA World Cup qualification (CAF) =

Tournament statistics
- Top scorer(s): (Kenya) William Ouma (Zaire) Kembo Uba Kembo (6 goals)

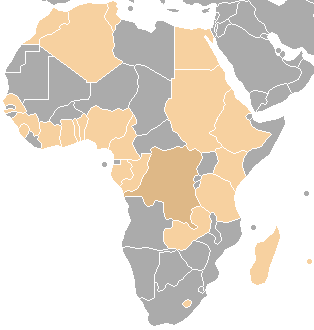
1974 FIFA World Cup qualification/Africa on a world map

Listed below are the dates and results for the 1974 FIFA World Cup qualification rounds for the African zone (CAF). For an overview of the qualification rounds, see the article 1974 FIFA World Cup qualification.

A total of 22 CAF teams entered the competition (two withdrew). The African Zone was allocated 1 place (out of 16) in the final tournament.

== Format ==
There would be four rounds of play:

- First Round, Second Round and Third Round: In each of these rounds, the teams were paired up to play knockout matches on a home-and-away basis. The winners would advance to the next round, until there would be 3 teams left.
- Final Round: The 3 teams would play against each other on a home-and-away basis. The group winner would qualify.

== First round ==
| Team 1 | Agg. | Team 2 | 1st leg | 2nd leg | 3rd leg |
|---|---|---|---|---|---|
| Morocco | 2–1 | Senegal | 0–0 | 2–1 | |
| Algeria | 2–5 | Guinea | 1–0 | 1–5 | |
| Egypt | 2–3 | Tunisia | 2–1 | 0–2 | |
| Sierra Leone | 0–3 | Ivory Coast | 0–1 | 0–2 | |
| Kenya | 2–1 | Sudan | 2–0 | 0–1 | |
| Tanzania | 1–4 | Ethiopia | 1–1 | 0–0 | 0–3 |
| Lesotho | 1–6 | Zambia | 0–0 | 1–6 | |
| Nigeria | 3–2 | Congo-Brazzaville | 2–1 | 1–1 | |
| Dahomey | 1–10 | Ghana | 0–5 | 1–5 | |
| Togo | 0–4 | Zaire | 0–0 | 0–4 | |
| Mauritius | w/o | Madagascar | — | — | |
| Cameroon | w/o | Gabon | — | — | |

19 November 1972

| Morocco | 0 – 0 | Senegal |

Stade Al Inbiaâte, Agadir, Morocco
Attendance: 10,650
Referee: Antonio Camacho Jiménez (Spain)
3 December 1972

| Senegal | 1 – 2 | Morocco |
|---|---|---|
| Diop 2' | | Ghazouani 26'; Choukri 72' |

Stade Demba Diop, Dakar, Senegal
Attendance: 9,860
Referee: Major George Lamptey (Ghana)

Morocco won 2–1 on agg. and advanced to the Second Round.

2 March 1972

| Algeria | 1 – 0 | Guinea |
|---|---|---|
| Kalem 65' |

Stade du 5 Juillet, Algiers, Algeria
Attendance: 15,267
Referee: Robert Héliès (France)
12 March 1972

| Guinea | 5 – 1 | Algeria |
|---|---|---|
| Camara 28'; Petit Sory 36'; Soumah 54' (pen.); Souleymane 78'; Samuel 82' | | Gamouh 62' |

Stade du 28 Septembre, Conakry, Guinea
Attendance: 18,000
Referee: Mamadou Mabel Ba (Mali)

Guinea won 5–2 on agg. and advanced to the Second Round.

8 December 1972

| Egypt | 2 – 1 | Tunisia |
|---|---|---|
| Khalil 10'; Abdelrazak 69' | | Chakroun 61' |

Nasser Stadium, Cairo, Egypt
Attendance: 11,707
Referee: Nikolaos Zlatanos (Greece)
17 December 1972

| Tunisia | 2 – 0 | Egypt |
|---|---|---|
| Chakroun 16'; Habita 71' |

Stade El Menzah, Tunis, Tunisia
Attendance: 32,178
Referee: Babaçan (Turkey)

Tunisia won 3–2 on agg. and advanced to the Second Round.

15 October 1972

| Sierra Leone | 0 – 1 | Ivory Coast |
|---|---|---|
| | | Ouattara 32' |

Reckrie Stadium, Freetown, Sierra Leone
Attendance: 9,200
Referee: Jean-Louis Faber (Guinea)
29 October 1972

| Ivory Coast | 2 – 0 | Sierra Leone |
|---|---|---|
| Kouamé 42'; Ouattara 72' |

Stade Félix Houphouët-Boigny, Abidjan, Ivory Coast
Attendance: 4,135
Referee: Moustapha N'Gom (Senegal)

Ivory Coast won 3–0 on agg. and advanced to the Second Round.

16 July 1972

| Kenya | 2 – 0 | Sudan |
|---|---|---|
| Anyanzwa 44'; W. Ouma 65' |

Nairobi City Stadium, Nairobi, Kenya
Attendance: 11,057
Referee: Ayele Tessema (Ethiopia)
23 July 1972

| Sudan | 1 – 0 | Kenya |
|---|---|---|
| Al-Dehish 40' |

Khartoum Stadium, Khartoum, Sudan
Attendance: 10,470
Referee: Mahmoud Moustapha Kamel (Egypt)

Kenya won 2–1 on agg. and advanced to the Second Round.

25 November 1972

| Tanzania | 1 – 1 | Ethiopia |
|---|---|---|
| Mashoto 58' | | Gebremedhin 30' |

Tanzania National Stadium, Dar es Salaam, Tanzania
Attendance: 14,255
Referee: Alfred John Olimba (Kenya)
3 December 1972

| Ethiopia | 0 – 0 | Tanzania |

Haile Selassie Stadium, Addis Ababa, Ethiopia
Attendance: 19,430
Referee: Abdel Rahman El-Khider Ali (Sudan)

The aggregate score was tied 1–1, and a play-off was played to decide who would advance to the Second Round.

10 December 1972

| Ethiopia | 3 – 0 | Tanzania |
|---|---|---|
| Ingdawerk 5', 12'; Tesfaye 44' |

Haile Selassie Stadium, Addis Ababa, Ethiopia
Attendance: 7,201
Referee: Ahmed Gindil Saleh (Sudan)

Ethiopia advanced to the Second Round, via the play-off.

30 April 1972

| Lesotho | 0 – 0 | Zambia |

Setsoto Stadium, Maseru, Lesotho
Referee: Manyoto Ndimbo (Tanzania)
4 June 1972

| Zambia | 6 – 1 | Lesotho |
|---|---|---|
| Mapulanga 25'; Chitalu 35', 80'; Mwila 40', 67', 72' | | Thietsi 30' |

Dag Hammarskjöld Stadium, Ndola, Zambia
Attendance: 11,457
Referee: Jules Ratsitohara (Madagascar)

Zambia won 6–1 on agg. and advanced to the Second Round.

5 August 1972

| Nigeria | 2 – 1 | Congo-Brazzaville |
|---|---|---|
| Olayombo 66'; Mambo 77' | | M'Bono 2' |

Liberty Stadium, Ibadan, Nigeria
Attendance: 20,056
Referee: Louis de Gonzague Atangana (Cameroon)
15 August 1972

| Congo-Brazzaville | 1 – 1 | Nigeria |
|---|---|---|
| Minga 88' | | Oyarekhua 28' |

Stade de la Revolution, Brazzaville, Congo
Attendance: 11,100
Referee: Jules Onwanlele (Gabon)

Nigeria won 3–2 on agg. and advanced to the Second Round.

18 June 1972

| Dahomey | 0 – 5 | Ghana |
|---|---|---|
| | | Sunday 21'; Owusu 26'; Ghartey 40'; Gariba 65', 75' |

Stade de l'Amitié, Cotonou, Dahomey
Attendance: 10,150
Referee: Thomas Attiogbe (Togo)
2 July 1972

| Ghana | 5 – 1 | Dahomey |
|---|---|---|
| Kofi 20', 44'; Sunday 64'; Owusu 66'; Odame 72' (pen.) | | Kamilou |

Kumasi Sports Stadium, Kumasi, Ghana
Attendance: 8,700
Referee: Poll Koudou (Ivory Coast)

Ghana won 10–1 on agg. and advanced to the Second Round.

6 June 1972

| Togo | 0 – 0 | Zaire |

Stade Général Eyadema, Lomé, Togo
Attendance: 5,719
Referee: Sunny Olufemi Woghiren (Nigeria)
20 June 1972

| Zaire | 4 – 0 | Togo |
|---|---|---|
| Kembo 27'; N'Tumba 37', 73'; Etepé 79' |

Stade Tata Raphaël, Kinshasa, Zaire
Attendance: 24,025
Referee: Stanislas Kamdem (Cameroon)

Zaire won 4–0 on agg. and advanced to the Second Round.

| Mauritius | w/o | Madagascar |
|---|---|---|
| | | Withdrew |

Madagascar withdrew, so Mauritius advanced to the Second Round automatically.

| Cameroon | w/o | Gabon |
|---|---|---|
| | | withdrew |

Gabon withdrew, so Cameroon advanced to the Second Round automatically.

== Second round ==
| Team 1 | Agg. | Team 2 | 1st leg | 2nd leg | 3rd leg |
|---|---|---|---|---|---|
| Guinea | 1–3 | Morocco | 1–1 | 0–2 | |
| Tunisia | 2–3 | Ivory Coast | 1–1 | 1–2 | |
| Mauritius | 3–5 | Kenya | 1–3 | 2–2 | |
| Ethiopia | 2–4 | Zambia | 0–0 | 2–4 | |
| Nigeria | 0–2 | Ghana | 0–2 | 0–0 | |
| Cameroon | 1–3 | Zaire | 0–1 | 1–0 | 0–2 |

11 February 1973

| Guinea | 1 – 1 | Morocco |
|---|---|---|
| Souleymane 38' | | Choukri 22' |

Stade du 28 Septembre, Conakry, Guinea
Attendance: 2,200
Referee: Pierre Mutombo (Zaire)
25 February 1973

| Morocco | 2 – 0 | Guinea |
|---|---|---|
| Faras 60', 68' |

Stade Saniat Rmel, Tetouan, Morocco
Attendance: 13,122
Referee: Marcel Edgar Bertin (Liberia)

Morocco won 3–1 on agg. and advanced to the Third Round.

11 February 1973

| Tunisia | 1 – 1 | Ivory Coast |
|---|---|---|
| Habita 48' (pen.) | | Kouamé 17' |

Stade El Menzah, Tunis, Tunisia
Attendance: 15,282
Referee: Salem Mohamed Adal (Libya)
25 February 1973

| Ivory Coast | 2 – 1 | Tunisia |
|---|---|---|
| N'Guessan 44', 85' (pen.) | | Adhouma 15' |

Stade Félix Houphouët-Boigny, Abidjan, Ivory Coast
Attendance: 52,586
Referee: Major George Lamptey (Ghana)

Ivory Coast won 3–2 on agg. and advanced to the Third Round.

10 December 1972

| Mauritius | 1 – 3 | Kenya |
|---|---|---|
| Imbert 37' | | W. Ouma 42', 84'; Shore 82' |

Stade George V, Curepipe, Mauritius
Attendance: 43,500
Referee: David Morton Galloway (Zambia)
17 December 1972

| Kenya | 2 – 2 | Mauritius |
|---|---|---|
| W. Ouma 56', 65' | | Jackaria 17'; Imbert 42' |

Nairobi City Stadium, Nairobi, Kenya
Attendance: 5,560
Referee: Williams Ngaah (Kenya)

Kenya won 5–3 on agg. and advanced to the Third Round.

1 April 1973

| Ethiopia | 0 – 0 | Zambia |

Haile Selassie Stadium, Addis Ababa, Ethiopia
Attendance: 12,708
Referee: Mahmoud Moustapha Kamel (Egypt)
15 April 1973

| Zambia | 4 – 2 | Ethiopia |
|---|---|---|
| Mugala 47'; Simutowe 62' (pen.); Simwala 71'; Mapulanga 83' | | Ingdawerk 43'; Teka 79' (pen.) |

7 April Stadium, Lusaka, Zambia
Attendance: 20,015
Referee: Ahmed Gindil Salih (Sudan)

Zambia won 4–2 on agg. and advanced to the Third Round.

10 February 1973

| Nigeria | 0 – 2 Awarded (2 – 3 85') | Ghana |
|---|---|---|
| Olayombo 15'; Mambo 23' | | Owusu 18' (pen.), 55', 82' |

Surulere Stadium, Lagos, Nigeria
Attendance: 31,362
Referee: Paul Nkounkou (Congo)
25 February 1973

| Ghana | 0 – 0 | Nigeria |

Accra Sports Stadium, Accra, Ghana
Attendance: 40,000
Referee: Moustapha N'Gom (Senegal)

Ghana won 2–0 on agg. and advanced to the Third Round.

4 February 1973

| Cameroon | 0 – 1 | Zaire |
|---|---|---|
| | | N'Tumba 2' |

Stade de la Réunification, Douala, Cameroon
Attendance: 21,752
Referee: Moise Kante Kangni (Dahomey)
25 February 1973

| Zaire | 0 – 1 | Cameroon |
|---|---|---|
| | | Ndongo 43' |

Stade du 20 Mai, Kinshasa, Zaire
Attendance: 46,916
Referee: Francis Wolbert Anguiley (Gabon)

The aggregate score was tied 1–1, and a play-off was played to decide who would advance to the Third Round.

27 February 1973

| Zaire | 2 – 0 | Cameroon |
|---|---|---|
| Etepé 3'; Tshinabu 88' (pen.) |

Stade du 20 Mai, Kinshasa, Zaire
Attendance: 16,271
Referee: Francis Wolbert Anguiley (Gabon)

Zaire advanced to the Third Round.

== Third round ==
| Team 1 | Agg. | Team 2 | 1st leg | 2nd leg |
|---|---|---|---|---|
| Ivory Coast | 2–5 | Morocco | 1–1 | 1–4 |
| Zambia | 4–2 | Kenya | 2–0 | 2–2 |
| Ghana | 2–4 | Zaire | 1–0 | 1–4 |

20 May 1973

| Ivory Coast | 1 – 1 | Morocco |
|---|---|---|
| Kobinam 75' | | Acila 30' |

Stade Félix Houphouët-Boigny, Abidjan, Ivory Coast
Attendance: 25,000
Referee: Badara N'Diaye (Senegal)
3 June 1973

| Morocco | 4 – 1 | Ivory Coast |
|---|---|---|
| Faras 24', 34'; Fetoui 60'; Choukri 85' | | Pokou 61' |

Stade Saniat Rmel, Tetouan, Morocco
Attendance: 11,000
Referee: Ahmed Khelifi (Algeria)

Morocco won 5–2 on agg. and advanced to the Final Round.

12 August 1973

| Zambia | 2 – 0 | Kenya |
|---|---|---|
| Chanda 34'; Sinyangwe 72' |

7 April Stadium, Ndola, Zambia
Attendance: 17,960
Referee: Gratian Hemans Matovu (Tanzania)
19 August 1973

| Kenya | 2 – 2 | Zambia |
|---|---|---|
| W. Ouma 65'; P. Ouma 70' | | Simwala; Kaushi 56' |

Nairobi City Stadium, Nairobi, Kenya
Attendance: 7,435
Referee: Farah Weheliye Addo (Somalia)

Zambia won 4–2 on agg. and advanced to the Final Round.

5 August 1973

| Ghana | 1 – 0 | Zaire |
|---|---|---|
| Armah 35' (pen.) |

Accra Sports Stadium, Accra, Ghana
Attendance: 28,700
Referee: Gebreyesus Tesfaye (Ethiopia)
19 August 1973

| Zaire | 4 – 1 | Ghana |
|---|---|---|
| Kembo 10', 65'; Mafuila 89' (pen.); N'Tumba 90' | | Sam 51' |

Stade du 20 Mai, Kinshasa, Zaire
Attendance: 80,869
Referee: Marc-Emile N'Difo (Cameroon)

Zaire won 4–2 on agg. and advanced to the Final Round.

== Final round ==
| Rank | Team | Pts | Pld | W | D | L | GF | GA | GD |
|---|---|---|---|---|---|---|---|---|---|
| 1 | Zaire | 8 | 4 | 4 | 0 | 0 | 9 | 1 | +8 |
| 2 | Zambia | 2 | 4 | 1 | 0 | 3 | 5 | 6 | −1 |
| 3 | Morocco | 2 | 4 | 1 | 0 | 3 | 2 | 9 | −7 |

21 October 1973

| Zambia | 4–0 | Morocco |
|---|---|---|
| Sinyangwe 17', 90'; Simwala 43'; Chanda 61' |

7 April Stadium, Lusaka
Attendance: 37,239
Referee: Gebreyesus Tesfaye (Ethiopia)

4 November 1973

| Zambia | 0–2 | Zaire |
|---|---|---|
| | | Mayanga 22'; Etepé 33' |

7 April Stadium, Lusaka
Attendance: 33,793
Referee: Farah Weheliye Addo (Somalia)

18 November 1973

| Zaire | 2–1 | Zambia |
|---|---|---|
| Kembo 32'; Etepé 82' | | Kapita 33' |

Stade du 20 Mai, Kinshasa
Attendance: 6,050
Referee: Badara N'Diaye (Senegal)

25 November 1973

| Morocco | 2–0 | Zambia |
|---|---|---|
| Maghfour 14'; Faras 70' |

Stade Saniat Rmel, Tétouan
Attendance: 5,456
Referee: Mohamed Diab Al-Attar (Egypt)

9 December 1973

| Zaire | 3–0 | Morocco |
|---|---|---|
| Kembo 58', 61'; Ekofa 79' |

Stade du 20 Mai, Kinshasa
Attendance: 70,750
Referee: Major George Lamptey (Ghana)

23 December 1973

| Morocco | 0–2 (w/o) | Zaire |

Stade El Bachir, Mohammedia

Zaire qualified.

== Qualified teams ==
| Team | Qualified as | Qualified on | Previous appearances in FIFA World Cup^{1} |
|---|---|---|---|
| Zaire | Final Round winners | 9 December 1973 | 0 (debut) |

^{1} Bold indicates champions for that year. Italic indicates hosts for that year.

== Goalscorers ==
6 goals

- (Kenya) William Ouma
- (Zaire) Kembo Uba Kembo

5 goals

- (Ghana) Kwasi Owusu
- (Morocco) Ahmed Faras

4 goals

- (Zaire) Kakoko Etepé
- (Zaire) Jean-Kalala N'Tumba

3 goals

- (Ethiopia) Tariku Ingdawerk
- (Morocco) Moustapha Choukri
- (Zambia) Freddie Mwila
- (Zambia) Moses Simwala
- (Zambia) Brighton Sinyangwe

2 goals

- (Ivory Coast) Noël Kouamé
- (Ivory Coast) Bernard N'Guessan
- (Ivory Coast) Mama Ouattara
- (Ghana) Abwcari Gariba
- (Ghana) Osei Kofi
- (Ghana) Ibrahim Sunday
- (Guinea) Chérif Souleymane
- (Mauritius) Daniel Jean Robert Imbert
- (Nigeria) Yakubu Mambo
- (Nigeria) Kenneth Olayombo
- (Tunisia) Ezzedine Chakroun
- (Tunisia) Mohieddine Habita
- (Zambia) Bernard Chanda
- (Zambia) Godfrey Chitalu
- (Zambia) Joseph Mapulanga

1 goal

- (Algeria) Rabah Gamouh
- (Algeria) Mokhtar Kalem
- (Cameroon) Paul-Gaston Ndongo
- (People's Republic of the Congo) Jean-Michel M'Bono
- (People's Republic of the Congo) Noël Minga
- (Ivory Coast) Kouman Kobinam
- (Ivory Coast) Laurent Pokou
- (Republic of Dahomey) Damien Kamilou
- (Egypt) Sayed Abdelrazak
- (Egypt) Ali Khalil
- (Ethiopia) Tekeste Gebremedhin
- (Ethiopia) Kassahun Teka
- (Ethiopia) Seyoum Tesfaye
- (Ghana) Akuetteh Armah
- (Ghana) Joseph Ghartey
- (Ghana) Clifford Odame
- (Ghana) Joseph Sam
- (Guinea) Maxime Camara
- (Guinea) Smith Samuel
- (Guinea) Petit Sory
- (Guinea) Soriba Soumah
- (Kenya) Daniel Anyanzwa
- (Kenya) Peter Ouma
- (Kenya) John Shore
- (Lesotho) Ramoseli Thietsi
- (Mauritius) Anwar Jackaria
- (Morocco) Hassan Amcharrat
- (Morocco) Chérif Fetoui
- (Morocco) Maouhoub Ghazouani
- (Morocco) Mohamed Maghfour
- (Nigeria) Sunday Oyarekhua
- (Senegal) Louis Gomis Diop
- (Sudan) Izzeldin Osman
- (Tanzania) Nassoro Mashoto
- (Tunisia) Abdesselam Adhouma
- (Zaire) Mbungu Ekofa
- (Zaire) Mavuba Mafuila
- (Zaire) Mayanga Maku
- (Zaire) Kamunda Tshinabu
- (Zambia) Obby Kapita
- (Zambia) Simon Kaushi
- (Zambia) Burton Mugala
- (Zambia) Boniface Simutowe

== See also ==
- 1974 FIFA World Cup qualification
- 1974 FIFA World Cup qualification (UEFA)
- 1974 FIFA World Cup qualification (CONCACAF)
- 1974 FIFA World Cup qualification (CONMEBOL)
- 1974 FIFA World Cup qualification (AFC and OFC)
