= 1974 FIFA World Cup qualification =

1974 FIFA World Cup Qualification
Tournament details
- Dates: 14 November 1971 – 13 February 1974
- Teams: 99 (from 6 confederations)

Tournament statistics
- Matches played: 226
- Goals scored: 619 (2.74 per match)
- Top scorer: (Trinidad and Tobago) Steve David (12 goals)

99 teams entered the 1974 FIFA World Cup qualification rounds, competing for 16 places in the final tournament. West Germany, as the hosts, and Brazil, as the defending champions, qualified automatically, leaving 14 spots open for competition.

The 16 spots available in the 1974 World Cup would be distributed among the continental zones as follows:

- Europe (UEFA): 9.5 places, 1 of them went to automatic qualifier West Germany, while the other 8.5 places were contested by 32 teams. The winner of the 0.5 place would advance to the Intercontinental Play-offs (against a team from CONMEBOL).
- South America (CONMEBOL): 3.5 places, 1 of them went to automatic qualifier Brazil, while the other 2.5 places were contested by 9 teams. The winner of the 0.5 place would advance to the Intercontinental Play-offs (against a team from UEFA).
- North, Central America and Caribbean (CONCACAF): 1 place, contested by 14 teams.
- Africa (CAF): 1 place, contested by 24 teams.
- Asia (AFC) and Oceania (OFC): 1 place, contested by 18 teams.

90 teams played at least one qualifying match. 226 qualifying matches were played, and 619 goals were scored (an average of 2.74 per match).

== Confederation qualification ==
=== AFC and OFC ===
Final Round

Team	Pld	W	D	L	GF	GA	GD	Pts	Qualification
Australia	2	0	2	0	2	2	0	2*	Final Tournament
South Korea	2	0	2	0	2	2	0	2*	

*As Australia and South Korea were tied on points, a playoff was organised. Australia won 1-0.

Australia qualified.

=== CAF ===
Team	Pld	W	D	L	GF	GA	GD	Pts	Qualification
Zaire	4	4	0	0	9	1	8	8	Final Tournament
Zambia	4	1	0	3	5	6	-1	2	
Morocco	4	1	0	3	2	9	-7	2	

Zaire qualified.

=== CONCACAF ===
Pos	Team	Pld	W	D	L	GF	GA	GD	Pts	Qualification
1	Haiti	5	4	0	1	8	3	+5	8	Final Tournament
2	Trinidad and Tobago	5	3	0	2	11	4	+7	6	
3	Mexico	5	2	2	1	10	5	+5	6	
4	Honduras	5	1	3	1	6	6	0	5	
5	Guatemala	5	0	3	2	4	6	−2	3	
6	Netherlands Antilles	5	0	2	3	4	19	−15	2	

Haiti qualified.

=== CONMEBOL ===
==== Group 1 ====
Rank	Team	Pld	W	D	L	GF	GA	GD	Pts	Qualification
1	Uruguay	4	2	1	1	6	2	+4	5	Final Tournament
2	Colombia	4	1	3	0	3	2	+1	5	
3	Ecuador	4	0	2	2	3	8	−5	2	

==== Group 2 ====
Rank	Team	Pld	W	D	L	GF	GA	GD	Pts	Qualification
1	Argentina	4	3	1	0	9	2	+7	7	Final Tournament
2	Paraguay	4	2	1	1	8	5	+3	5	
3	Bolivia	4	0	0	4	1	11	−10	0	

==== Group 3 ====
Rank	Team	Pld	W	D	L	GF	GA	GD	Pts	Qualification
1=	Chile	2	1	0	1	2	2	0	2*	Intercontinental Playoffs
1=	Peru	2	1	0	1	2	2	0	2*	
—	Venezuela	withdrew								

*Chile and Peru finished with the same record, so a playoff was organised. Chile won 2-1.

Group 1 – Uruguay qualified.
Group 2 – Argentina qualified.
Group 3 – Chile advanced to the UEFA / CONMEBOL Intercontinental Play-off.

=== UEFA ===
==== Group 1 ====
Rank	Team	Pld	W	D	L	GF	GA	GD	Pts	Qualification
1=	Sweden	6	3	2	1	15	8	+7	8*	Final Tournament
1=	Austria	6	3	2	1	14	7	+7	8*	
3	Hungary	6	2	4	0	12	7	+5	8	
4	Malta	6	0	0	6	1	20	−19	0	

*Sweden and Austria finished with the same record so a playoff was organised. Sweden won 2-1.

==== Group 2 ====
Rank	Team	Pld	W	D	L	GF	GA	GD	Pts	Qualification
1	Italy	6	4	2	0	12	0	+12	10	Final Tournament
2	Turkey	6	2	2	2	5	3	+2	6	
3	Switzerland	6	2	2	2	2	4	−2	6	
4	Luxembourg	6	1	0	5	2	14	−12	2	

==== Group 3 ====
Rank	Team	Pld	W	D	L	GF	GA	GD	Pts	Qualification
1	Netherlands	6	4	2	0	24	2	+22	10	Final Tournament
2	Belgium	6	4	2	0	12	0	+12	10	
3	Norway	6	2	0	4	9	16	−7	4	
4	Iceland	6	0	0	6	2	29	−27	0	

==== Group 4 ====
Rank	Team	Pld	W	D	L	GF	GA	GD	Pts	Qualification
1	East Germany	6	5	0	1	18	3	+15	10	Final Tournament
2	Romania	6	4	1	1	17	4	+13	9	
3	Finland	6	1	1	4	3	21	−18	3	
4	Albania	6	1	0	5	3	13	−10	2	

==== Group 5 ====
Rank	Team	Pld	W	D	L	GF	GA	GD	Pts	Qualification
1	Poland	4	2	1	1	6	3	+3	5	Final Tournament
2	England	4	1	2	1	3	4	−1	4	
3	Wales	4	1	1	2	3	5	−2	3	

==== Group 6 ====
Rank	Team	Pld	W	D	L	GF	GA	GD	Pts	Qualification
1	Bulgaria	6	4	2	0	13	3	+10	10	Final Tournament
2	Portugal	6	2	3	1	10	6	+4	7	
3	Northern Ireland	6	1	3	2	5	6	−1	5	
4	Cyprus	6	1	0	5	1	14	−13	2	

==== Group 7 ====
Rank	Team	Pld	W	D	L	GF	GA	GD	Pts	Qualification
1=	Yugoslavia	4	2	2	0	7	4	+3	6*	Final Tournament
1=	Spain	4	2	2	0	8	5	+3	6*	
3	Greece	4	0	0	4	5	11	−6	0	

*Yugoslavia and Spain finished with the same record so a playoff was organised. Yugoslavia won 1-0.

==== Group 8 ====
Rank	Team	Pld	W	D	L	GF	GA	GD	Pts	Qualification
1	Scotland	4	3	0	1	8	3	+5	6	Final Tournament
2	Czechoslovakia	4	2	1	1	9	3	+6	5	
3	Denmark	4	0	1	3	2	13	−11	1	

==== Group 9 ====
ank	Team	Pld	W	D	L	GF	GA	GD	Pts	Qualification
1	Soviet Union	4	3	0	1	5	2	+3	6	Intercontinental Playoffs
2	Republic of Ireland	4	1	1	2	4	5	−1	3	
3	France	4	1	1	2	3	5	−2	3	

Group 1 – Sweden qualified.
Group 2 – Italy qualified.
Group 3 – Netherlands qualified.
Group 4 – East Germany qualified.
Group 5 – Poland qualified.
Group 6 – Bulgaria qualified.
Group 7 – Yugoslavia qualified.
Group 8 – Scotland qualified.
Group 9 – Soviet Union advanced to the UEFA / CONMEBOL Intercontinental Play-off.

== Inter-confederation play-offs: UEFA v CONMEBOL ==
The teams would play against each other on a home-and-away basis, with the winner qualifying to the finals.

The second leg was scratched as the Soviet Union were disqualified after they refused to travel to Santiago for the return leg due to the 1973 Chilean coup d'état and the executions of left-wing prisoners in the Santiago stadium. The match did "go ahead" with the eleven Chilean players facing zero Soviet players before thousands of bemused spectators, and half a dozen Chilean players slowly passed the ball to each other in mock play until the captain walked the ball into the net.

Team 1	Agg.	Team 2	1st leg	2nd leg
Soviet Union	w.o. (Note: The Soviet Union refused to play in Chile for the second leg, so Chile were awarded a 2–0 walkover victory.)	Chile	0–0	0–2

== Qualified teams ==
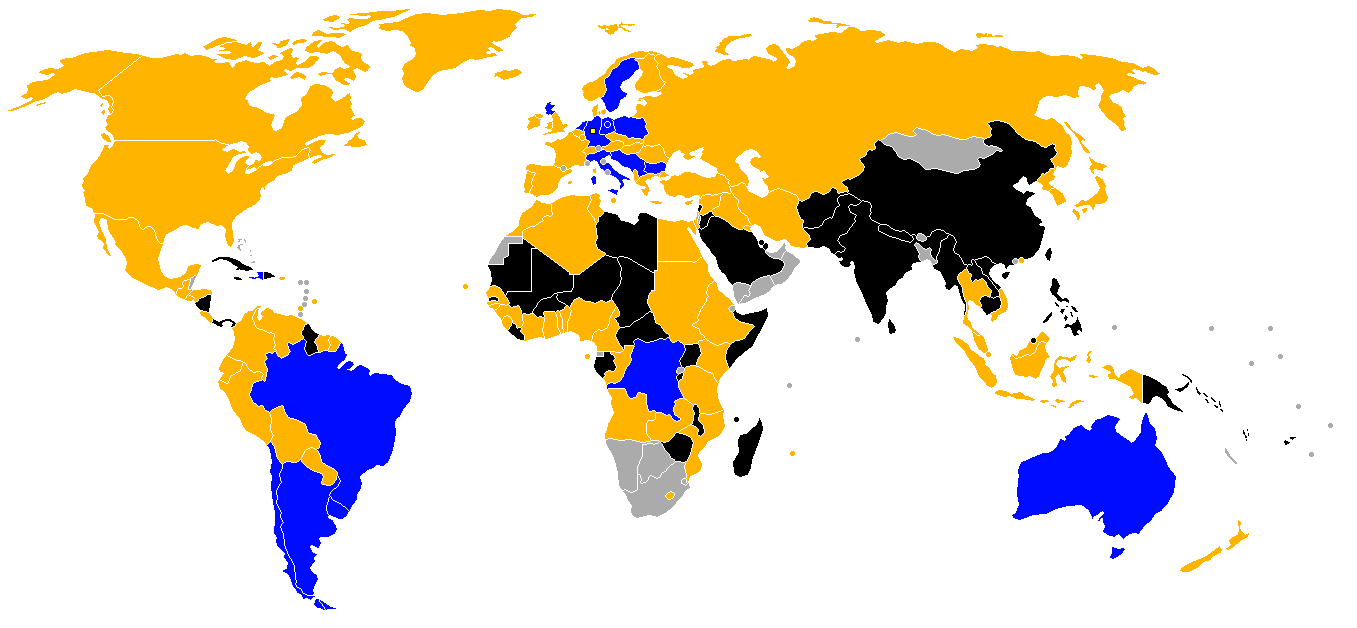
Final qualification status Country qualified for World Cup Country failed to qualify Country did not enter World Cup Country not a FIFA member

The following 16 teams qualified for the 1974 FIFA World Cup:

Team	Date of qualification	Finals appearance	Streak	Last appearance
Argentina	7 October 1973	6th	1	1966
Australia	13 November 1973	1st	1	—
Brazil (defending champions)	21 June 1970	10th	10	1970
Bulgaria	14 November 1973	4th	4	1970
Chile	21 November 1973	5th	1	1966
East Germany	13 November 1973	1st	1	—
Haiti	14 December 1973	1st	1	—
Italy	20 October 1973	8th	4	1970
Netherlands	18 November 1973	3rd	1	1938
Poland	17 October 1973	2nd	1	1938
Scotland	26 September 1973	3rd	1	1958
Sweden	27 November 1973	6th	2	1970
Uruguay	8 July 1973	7th	4	1970
West Germany (hosts)	6 July 1966	8th	6	1970
Yugoslavia	13 February 1974	6th	1	1962
Zaire	9 December 1973	1st	1	—

== Goalscorers ==
12 goals

- (Trinidad and Tobago) Steve David

11 goals

- (Haiti) Emmanuel Sanon

7 goals

- (Bulgaria) Hristo Bonev
- (East Germany) Joachim Streich
- (Italy) Luigi Riva
- (Netherlands) Johan Cruyff

6 goals

- (Kenya) William Ouma
- (Zaire) Kembo Uba Kembo

5 goals

- (Argentina) Rubén Ayala
- (Ghana) Kwasi Owusu
- (Iraq) Sabah Hatim
- (Israel) Moshe Onana
- (Morocco) Ahmed Faras
- (Netherlands) Willy Brokamp
- (Romania) Florea Dumitrache
- (Sweden) Roland Sandberg

4 goals

- (Australia) Adrian Alston
- (Belgium) Raoul Lambert
- (East Germany) Jürgen Sparwasser
- (Mexico) Octavio Muciño
- (Netherlands) Johan Neeskens
- (Suriname (Kingdom of the Netherlands)) Arnold Robert Zebeda
- (Sweden) Ralf Edström
- (Sweden) Bo Larsson
- (Trinidad and Tobago) Sammy Llewellyn
- (Zaire) Kakoko Etepé
- (Zaire) Jean-Kalala N'Tumba

3 goals

- (Austria) Josef Hickersberger
- (Austria) Kurt Jara
- (Australia) Attila Abonyi
- (Australia) Ray Baartz
- (Australia) Jimmy Mackay
- (Bulgaria) Georgi Denev
- (Colombia) Willington Ortiz
- (Czechoslovakia) Zdeněk Nehoda
- (Czechoslovakia) Bohumil Veselý
- (Ethiopia) Tariku Ingdawerk
- (Haiti) Jean-Claude Désir
- (Honduras) Rigoberto Gómez
- (Honduras) Rubén Guifarro
- (Hungary) Ferenc Bene
- (Iran) Parviz Ghelichkhani
- (Mexico) Horacio López Salgado
- (Morocco) Moustapha Choukri
- (Norway) Tor Egil Johansen
- (South Korea) Chung Kyu-poong
- (South Korea) Kim Jae-han
- (Syria) Joseph Chahrestan
- (Trinidad and Tobago) Raymond Roberts
- (Uruguay) Fernando Morena
- (United States) Willy Roy
- (Socialist Federal Republic of Yugoslavia) Dušan Bajević
- (Zambia) Freddie Mwila
- (Zambia) Moses Simwala
- (Zambia) Brighton Sinyangwe

2 goals

- (Argentina) Miguel Ángel Brindisi
- (Antigua and Barbuda) Patrick Morris
- (Austria) August Starek
- (Australia) Branko Buljevic
- (Australia) Ernie Campbell
- (Australia) Ray Richards
- (Belgium) Léon Dolmans
- (Belgium) Odilon Polleunis
- (Bulgaria) Bozhil Kolev
- (Ivory Coast) Noël Kouamé
- (Ivory Coast) Bernard N'Guessan
- (Ivory Coast) Mama Ouattara
- (East Germany) Bernd Bransch
- (East Germany) Hans-Jürgen Kreische
- (East Germany) Wolfram Löwe
- (Ecuador) Washington Muñoz
- (Ghana) Abwcari Gariba
- (Ghana) Osei Kofi
- (Ghana) Ibrahim Sunday
- (Guatemala) Nelson Melgar
- (Guinea) Chérif Souleymane
- (Hong Kong) Yuen Kuen-Chu
- (Honduras) Jorge Bran
- (Hungary) Lajos Kocsis
- (Hungary) Sándor Zámbó
- (Indonesia) Iswadi Idris
- (Indonesia) Sarman Panggabean
- (Republic of Ireland) Terry Conroy
- (Iraq) Ali Kadhim
- (Israel) Zvi Rozen
- (Israel) Itzhak Shum
- (Italy) Gianni Rivera
- (Japan) Kunishige Kamamoto
- (Kuwait) Hamad Bo Hamad
- (Mauritius) Daniel Imbert
- (Mexico) Juan Manuel Borbolla
- (Mexico) Enrique Borja
- (Mexico) Fernando Bustos
- (Mexico) Cesário Victorino
- (Netherlands) Willem van Hanegem
- (Nigeria) Yakubu Mambo
- (Nigeria) Kenneth Olayombo
- (New Zealand) Alan Vest
- (North Korea) Ma Jung-U
- (Northern Ireland) Trevor Anderson
- (Norway) Harry Hestad
- (Paraguay) Adalberto Escobar
- (Paraguay) Saturnino Arrúa
- (Paraguay) Jorge Insfran
- (Peru) Hugo Sotil
- (Poland) Jan Domarski
- (Poland) Robert Gadocha
- (Portugal) Rui Jordão
- (Portugal) Nené
- (Romania) Ion Dumitru
- (Romania) Dumitru Marcu
- (Romania) Mircea Sandu
- (South Korea) Cha Bum-kun
- (Soviet Union) Volodymyr Onyshchenko
- (Spain) José Claramunt
- (Spain) Rubén Óscar Valdez
- (Suriname (Kingdom of the Netherlands)) Armand Doesburg
- (Suriname (Kingdom of the Netherlands)) Arnold Miller
- (Suriname (Kingdom of the Netherlands)) Edwin Schalf
- (Sweden) Ove Kindvall
- (Trinidad and Tobago) Leo Brewster
- (Trinidad and Tobago) Everald Cummings
- (Trinidad and Tobago) Leroy Spann
- (Tunisia) Ezzedine Chakroun
- (Tunisia) Mohieddine Habita
- (Turkey) Osman Arpacıoğlu
- (Uruguay) Luis Cubilla
- (United States) Gene Geimer
- (Socialist Federal Republic of Yugoslavia) Stanislav Karasi
- (Zambia) Bernard Chanda
- (Zambia) Godfrey Chitalu
- (Zambia) Joseph Mapulanga

1 goal

- (Albania) Sabah Bizi
- (Albania) Mihal Gjika
- (Albania) Ramazan Rragami
- (Algeria) Rabah Gamouh
- (Algeria) Mokhtar Kalem
- (Antigua and Barbuda) Veron Edwards
- (Argentina) Oscar Fornari
- (Argentina) Carlos Guerini
- (Australia) Doug Utjesenovic
- (Australia) Peter Wilson
- (Austria) Franz Hasil
- (Austria) Roland Hattenberger
- (Austria) Norbert Hof
- (Austria) Helmut Köglberger
- (Austria) Thomas Parits
- (Austria) Peter Pumm
- (Belgium) Jean Dockx
- (Belgium) Paul Van Himst
- (Belgium) Frans Janssens
- (Bolivia) Raúl Morales
- (Bulgaria) Atanas Mihaylov
- (Canada) Jimmy Douglas
- (Canada) Glen Johnson
- (Canada) Ike MacKay
- (Canada) Buzz Parsons
- (Canada) Brian Robinson
- (Canada) Bruce Twamley
- (Cameroon) Paul-Gaston Ndongo
- (Chile) Sergio Ahumada
- (Chile) Julio Crisosto
- (Chile) Rogelio Farias
- (Chile) Francisco Valdés
- (People's Republic of the Congo) Jean-Michel M'Bono
- (People's Republic of the Congo) Noël Minga
- (Costa Rica) Selvin Cárcamo
- (Costa Rica) Wálter Elizondo
- (Costa Rica) Asdrúbal Paniagua
- (Costa Rica) Roy Sáenz
- (Ivory Coast) Kouman Kobinam
- (Ivory Coast) Laurent Pokou
- (Cyprus) Kokos Antoniou
- (Czechoslovakia) Přemysl Bičovský
- (Czechoslovakia) Vladimír Hagara
- (Czechoslovakia) Ladislav Petráš
- (Republic of Dahomey) Damien Kamilou
- (Denmark) Ole Bjørnmose
- (Denmark) Finn Laudrup
- (East Germany) Peter Ducke
- (Ecuador) Ítalo Estupiñán
- (England) Colin Bell
- (England) Allan Clarke
- (England) Norman Hunter
- (Egypt) Sayed Abdelrazak
- (Egypt) Ali Khalil
- (Ethiopia) Tekeste Gebremedhin
- (Ethiopia) Kassahun Teka
- (Ethiopia) Seyoum Tesfaye
- (Finland) Jarmo Manninen
- (Finland) Olavi Rissanen
- (Finland) Miikka Toivola
- (France) Georges Bereta
- (France) Serge Chiesa
- (France) Jean-Michel Larqué
- (Ghana) Akuetteh Armah
- (Ghana) Joseph Ghartey
- (Ghana) Clifford Odame
- (Ghana) Joseph Sam
- (Greece) Antonis Antoniadis
- (Greece) Mimis Domazos
- (Greece) Kostas Eleftherakis
- (Greece) Giorgos Koudas
- (Guinea) Maxime Camara
- (Guinea) Smith Samuel
- (Guinea) Petit Sory
- (Guinea) Soriba Soumah
- (Guatemala) Juan Banegas
- (Guatemala) Benjamín Monterroso
- (Guatemala) René Morales
- (Guatemala) Jorge Roldán
- (Haiti) Claude Barthélemy
- (Haiti) Pierre Bayonne
- (Haiti) Guy François
- (Haiti) Guy Saint-Vil
- (Haiti) Roger Saint-Vil
- (Haiti) Philippe Vorbe
- (Honduras) Óscar Rolando Hernández
- (Honduras) Rigoberto Sosa
- (Honduras) Jorge Urquía
- (Hong Kong) Kwok Ka-Ming
- (Hong Kong) Lo Hung-Hoi
- (Hungary) László Bálint
- (Hungary) Antal Dunai
- (Hungary) István Juhász
- (Hungary) Mihály Kozma
- (Hungary) Csaba Vidáts
- (Iceland) Elmar Geirsson
- (Iceland) Örn Óskarsson
- (Indonesia) Andjas Asmara
- (Iran) Ali Jabbari
- (Iran) Akbar Kargarjam
- (Iran) Mehdi Monajati
- (Iran) Ali Parvin
- (Iran) Mohammad Sadeghi
- (Iran) Gholam Vafakhah
- (Iraq) Douglas Aziz
- (Iraq) Riyadh Nouri
- (Iraq) Bashar Rashid
- (Iraq) Salah Obeid
- (Republic of Ireland) Mick Martin
- (Republic of Ireland) Ray Treacy
- (Israel) George Borba
- (Israel) Zvi Farkash
- (Israel) Mordechai Spiegler
- (Italy) Pietro Anastasi
- (Italy) Fabio Capello
- (Italy) Giorgio Chinaglia
- (Japan) Shusaku Hirasawa
- (Japan) Takaji Mori
- (Kenya) Daniel Anyanzwa
- (Kenya) Peter Ouma
- (Kenya) John Shore
- (Kuwait) Ibrahim Al Duraihem
- (Kuwait) Fathi Kameel
- (Lesotho) Ramoseli Thietsi
- (Luxembourg) Nico Braun
- (Luxembourg) Gilbert Dussier
- (Malaysia) Shaharuddin Abdullah
- (Malaysia) Harun Jusoh
- (Malta) Anton Camilleri
- (Mauritius) Anwar Jackaria
- (Mexico) Manuel Lapuente
- (Mexico) Héctor Pulido
- (Mexico) Sergio Ceballos Aldape
- (Morocco) Hassan Amcharrat
- (Morocco) Chérif Fetoui
- (Morocco) Maouhoub Ghazouani
- (Morocco) Mohamed Maghfour
- (Netherlands) Arie Haan
- (Netherlands) Barry Hullshoff
- (Netherlands) Theo de Jong
- (Netherlands) Piet Keizer
- (Netherlands) René van de Kerkhof
- (Netherlands) Dick Schneider
- (Netherlands Antilles) Rignald Alfonso Clemencia
- (Netherlands Antilles) Adelbert Toppenberg
- (Netherlands Antilles) Siegfried Schoop
- (Netherlands Antilles) Erroll Maximino St. Jago
- (New Zealand) Dennis Tindall
- (New Zealand) Brian Turner
- (Nigeria) Sunday Oyarekhua
- (North Korea) An Se-Uk
- (North Korea) Kim Jong-Min
- (North Korea) Pak Sung-Jin
- (Northern Ireland) Sammy Morgan
- (Northern Ireland) Liam O'Kane
- (Northern Ireland) Martin O'Neill
- (Norway) Jan Fuglset
- (Norway) Tom Lund
- (Norway) Per Pettersen
- (Norway) Harald Sunde
- (Paraguay) Pedro Alcides Bareiro
- (Paraguay) Juvencio Osorio
- (Peru) Héctor Bailetti
- (Poland) Grzegorz Lato
- (Poland) Włodzimierz Lubański
- (Portugal) Humberto Coelho
- (Portugal) Eusébio
- (Portugal) Chico Faria
- (Portugal) Artur Jorge
- (Portugal) Alfredo Quaresma
- (Portugal) António Simões
- (Romania) Emerich Dembrovschi
- (Romania) Nicolae Dobrin
- (Romania) Dudu Georgescu
- (Romania) Radu Nunweiller
- (Romania) Nicolae Pantea
- (Romania) Teodor Tarălungă
- (Scotland) Jimmy Bone
- (Scotland) Kenny Dalglish
- (Scotland) Joe Harper
- (Scotland) Jim Holton
- (Scotland) Joe Jordan
- (Scotland) Peter Lorimer
- (Scotland) Lou Macari
- (Scotland) Willie Morgan
- (Senegal) Louis Gomis Diop
- (South Korea) Ko Jae-wook
- (South Korea) Park Lee-chun
- (Soviet Union) Oleh Blokhin
- (Soviet Union) Vladimir Fedotov
- (Soviet Union) Viktor Kolotov
- (Spain) Amancio Amaro
- (Spain) Juan Manuel Asensi
- (Spain) Roberto Juan Martínez
- (Spain) Juan Cruz Sol
- (Sudan) Izzeldin Osman
- (Suriname (Kingdom of the Netherlands)) Eugene Sordam
- (Sweden) Ove Grahn
- (Sweden) Dag Szepanski
- (Switzerland) Rolf Blättler
- (Switzerland) Karl Odermatt
- (Syria) Nabil Nano
- (Syria) Samir Said
- (Syria) Abdulghani Tatiche
- (Tanzania) Nassoro Mashoto
- (Trinidad and Tobago) Warren Archibald
- (Tunisia) Abdesselam Adhouma
- (Turkey) Köksal Mesçi
- (Turkey) Mehmet Türkkan
- (Turkey) Melih Atacan
- (Uruguay) Denís Milar
- (United States) Rudy Getzinger
- (Wales) Trevor Hockey
- (Wales) Leighton James
- (Wales) John Toshack
- (Socialist Federal Republic of Yugoslavia) Jovan Aćimović
- (Socialist Federal Republic of Yugoslavia) Josip Katalinski
- (Socialist Federal Republic of Yugoslavia) Ivica Šurjak
- (Zaire) Mbungu Ekofa
- (Zaire) Mavuba Mafuila
- (Zaire) Mayanga Maku
- (Zaire) Kamunda Tshinabu
- (Zambia) Obby Kapita
- (Zambia) Simon Kaushi
- (Zambia) Burton Mugala
- (Zambia) Boniface Simutowe

1 own goal

- (Australia) Bobby Hogg (playing against New Zealand)
- (Netherlands Antilles) Siegfried Brunken (playing against Trinidad and Tobago)
- (Iceland) Einar Gunnarsson (playing against Belgium)
- (Malta) Charles Spiteri (playing against Austria)
- (New Zealand) Maurice Tillotson (playing against Indonesia)
- (South Vietnam) Nguyễn Vinh Quang (playing against Japan)
- (Thailand) Supakit Meelarpkit (playing against South Vietnam)
- (Socialist Federal Republic of Yugoslavia) Josip Katalinski (playing against Greece)

== Notes ==
- For the first time in the qualifiers, goal difference was used as a tie-breaker for teams who finished level on points. Aggregate score was also used to determine the winners of two-legged ties.
