= Mauritius national football team results (1970–1979) =

These are a list of matches played by the Mauritius national football team from 1970 to 1979. These were the first games played by Mauritius as an independent nation.

== Key ==
Win Draw Loss

== Matches ==
=== 1970 ===
| 6 July 1970 Friendly | Malawi | 0–1 | Mauritius | Malawi |
| | | Report |

| 9 July 1970 Friendly | Malawi | 0–0 | Mauritius | Malawi |
| | | Report |

| 15 November 1970 1972 ACoN qual | Madagascar | 2–1 | Mauritius | Madagascar |
| | | Report |

| 29 November 1970 1972 ACoN qual | Mauritius | 4–1 | Madagascar | Mauritius |
| | | Report |

=== 1971 ===
| 28 March 1971 Friendly | Madagascar | 3–0 | Mauritius | Madagascar |
| | | Report |

| 27 June 1971 Friendly | Madagascar | 1–1 | Mauritius | Madagascar |
| | | Report |

| 4 July 1971 1972 ACoN qual | Kenya | 2–1 | Mauritius | Kenya |
| | | Report |

| 18 July 1971 1972 ACoN qual | Mauritius | 0–0 | Kenya | Mauritius |
| | | Report |

=== 1972 ===
| ??? 1972 Friendly | Tanzania | 4–1 | Mauritius | Tanzania |
| | | Report |

| 10 December 1972 1974 WC qual | Mauritius | 1–3 | Kenya | Port Louis, Mauritius |
| | | Report | | Referee: Galloway (Zambia) |

| 17 December 1972 1974 WC qual | Kenya | 2–2 | Mauritius | Nairobi, Kenya |
| | Aluko (?); Azibwa (?) | Report | Imbert (?) (?) | Referee: Ngaah (Kenya) |

=== 1973 ===
| 15 July 1973 Friendly | Mauritius | 1–1 | Réunion | Mauritius |
| | | Report |

| 16 September 1973 1974 ACoN qual | Lesotho | 0–0 | Mauritius | Lesotho |
| | | Report |

| 30 September 1973 1974 ACoN qual | Mauritius | 5–1 | Lesotho | Mauritius |
| | | Report |

| 28 October 1973 1974 ACoN qual | Tanzania | 1–1 | Mauritius | Tanzania |
| | | Report |

| 11 November 1973 1974 ACoN qual | Mauritius | 0–0 (4–2 p) | Tanzania | Mauritius |
| | | Report |
| | Penalties |
| | ? | | ? |

=== 1974 ===
| 3 March 1974 1974 ACoN | Congo-Brazzaville | 2–0 | Mauritius | Alexandria, Egypt |
| | Moukila (?); Lakou (?) | Report |

| 5 March 1974 1974 ACoN | Guinea | 2–1 | Mauritius | Damanhour, Egypt |
| | Sylla (?) (?) | Report | Imbert (?) |

| 7 March 1974 1974 ACoN | Zaire | 4–1 | Mauritius | Damanhour, Egypt |
| | Maku (?) (?); N'Daye (?); Etepe (?) | Report | Imbert (?) |

=== 1975 ===
| 4 May 1975 Friendly | Zambia | 5–0 | Mauritius | Zambia |
| | | Report |

| 18 May 1975 Friendly | Mauritius | 0–4 | Zambia | Mauritius |
| | | Report |

| 14 September 1975 1976 ACoN qual | Uganda | 4–0 | Mauritius | Uganda |
| | | Report |

| 28 September 1975 Friendly | Mauritius | 1–1 | Uganda | Mauritius |
| | | Report |

=== 1976 ===
| 2 July 1976 Friendly | Réunion | 0–2 | Mauritius | Réunion |
| | | Report |

| 24 October 1976 1978 ACoN qual | Malawi | 1–1 | Mauritius | Malawi |
| | | Report |

=== 1977 ===
| 28 January 1977 1978 ACoN qual | Mauritius | 3–2 | Malawi | Mauritius |
| | | Report |

| 18 September 1976 Friendly | Réunion | 0–2 | Mauritius | Réunion |
| | | Report |

| 28 September 1977 1978 ACoN qual | Mauritius | 2–3 | Ethiopia | Mauritius |
| | | Report |

| 12 October 1977 1978 ACoN qual | Ethiopia | 1–0 | Mauritius | Ethiopia |
| | | Report |

=== 1978 ===
| 24 January 1978 Friendly | Malawi | 2–1 | Mauritius | Malawi |
| | | Report |

| 23 September 1978 Friendly | Réunion | 0–2 | Mauritius | Réunion |
| | | Report |

| 3 December 1978 1980 ACoN qual | Mauritius | 0–1 | Lesotho | Mauritius |
| | | Report |

| 17 December 1978 1980 ACoN qual | Lesotho | 1–2 | Mauritius | Lesotho |
| | | Report |

=== 1979 ===
| 6 May 1979 1980 ACoN qual | Lesotho | 4–1 | Mauritius | Lesotho |
| | | Report |

| 13 May 1979 1980 ACoN qual | Mauritius | 2–3 | Lesotho | Mauritius |
| | | Report |

| 26 August 1979 1979 IOIG | Mauritius | 3–0 | Comoros | Réunion |
| | | Report |

| 28 August 1979 1979 IOIG | Comoros | 1–3 | Mauritius | Réunion |
| | | Report |

| 31 August 1979 1979 IOIG semis | Seychelles | 1–1 (4–2 p) | Mauritius | Réunion |
| | | Report |
| | Penalties |
| | ? | | ? |

| 1 September 1979 1979 IOIG 3rd | Comoros | w/o | Mauritius | Réunion |

Mauritius withdrew from the match due to transport problems. Comoros was awarded 3rd place.

| 16 September 1979 1980 ACoN qual | Mauritius | 3–2 | Tanzania | Mauritius |
| | | Report |

| 30 September 1979 1980 ACoN qual | Tanzania | 4–0 | Mauritius | Tanzania |
| | | Report |
