= 1974 FIFA World Cup qualification (AFC and OFC) =

Tournament details
- Dates: 4 March – 13 November 1973
- Teams: 15 (from 2 confederations)

Tournament statistics
- Matches played: 44
- Goals scored: 101 (2.3 per match)
- Attendance: 634,884 (14,429 per match)
- Top scorer(s): (Iraq) Sabah Hatim (Israel) Moshe Onana (5 goals each)

The Asian and Oceanian (AFC and OFC) qualification rounds for the 1974 FIFA World Cup took place between 4 March and 13 November 1973. In total, 15 teams – 13 from Asia and two from Oceania – entered the competition for one place at the finals in West Germany.

Following multiple rounds of qualifying in two zones, Australia qualified for the FIFA World Cup for the first time, becoming the first team from Oceania to do so, after defeating South Korea in the final round.

== Background ==
Teams from Asia first took part in qualification for the FIFA World Cup in 1934 when Mandatory Palestine entered. In 1938, the Dutch East Indies became the first team from Asia to qualify after their opponents Japan and the United States both withdrew. Asian teams had limited experience at the World Cup after only the Dutch East Indies in 1938, India in 1950, (Note: India qualified without playing a match but withdrew from the 1950 FIFA World Cup.) South Korea in 1954, North Korea in 1966 and Israel in 1970 had qualified for the finals.

Australia became the first team from Oceania to enter qualification for the FIFA World Cup in 1966. No team team from Oceania had qualified for the World Cup before.

== Format ==
Originally, the format was to be a single-elimination tournament. India, Sri Lanka and the Philippines withdrew after the initial seeding and, instead, a zonal qualification system was used.

Zone A included six teams from East Asia plus Israel. All teams other than South Korea would play a preliminary match to decide which group they would enter in the first round. The seven teams then contested two single round robin groups – one of three teams and one of four teams. The group winners and runners-up would contest a semi-final and final round to determine the winner of Zone A.

Zone B included the remaining eight teams. They were drawn into two double round robin groups of four teams. The two group winners would contest a two-legged tie to decide the winner of Zone B.

The two zone winners would contest a two-legged tie to decide which team qualified for the finals.

=== Participants ===
AFC

- Hong Kong
- Indonesia
- Iran
- Iraq
- Israel
- Japan
- Kuwait
- Malaysia
- North Korea
- South Korea
- Thailand
- South Vietnam
- Syria

OFC

- Australia
- New Zealand

== Zone A ==
All matches were played in Seoul, South Korea.

=== Preliminary matches ===
In the preliminary matches, the winners of pairs two and three and the loser of pair one would be allocated to Group A. The other teams were allocated to Group B.

Preliminary matches
Team 1	Score	Team 2
South Vietnam	1–0	Thailand
Israel	2–1	Japan
Hong Kong	1–0	Malaysia

==== Matches ====
16 May 1973

South Vietnam	1–0	Thailand
Meelarpkit 83' (o.g.)

Dongdaemun Stadium, Seoul
Attendance: 4,091
Referee: Les Coffman (New Zealand)

16 May 1973

Israel	2–1	Japan
Onana 5', 61'		Hirasawa 28'

Dongdaemun Stadium, Seoul
Attendance: 4,091
Referee: Tony Boskovic (Australia)

17 May 1973

Hong Kong	1–0	Malaysia
Lo Hung Hoi 53'

Dongdaemun Stadium, Seoul
Attendance: 188
Referee: Mahomed Azam (India)

=== Group stage ===
==== Group A ====
Hong Kong and Japan advanced to the Zone A semi-finals.

===== Table =====
Pos	Team	Pld	W	D	L	GF	GA	GD	Pts	Qualification	Hong Kong 1959	Japan	South Vietnam
1	Hong Kong	2	2	0	0	2	0	+2	4	Advance to Zone A semi-finals	—	1–0	1–0
2	Japan	2	1	0	1	4	1	+3	2	Advance to Zone A semi-finals	—	—	4–0
3	South Vietnam	2	0	0	2	0	5	−5	0		—	—	—

Rules for classification: Tiebreakers

===== Matches =====
20 May 1973

Japan	4–0	South Vietnam
Kamamoto 6', 86'; Mori 19'; Quang 54' (o.g.)

Dongdaemun Stadium, Seoul
Attendance: 6,352
Referee: Les Coffman (New Zealand)

22 May 1973

Hong Kong	1–0	Japan
Kwok Ka Ming 83'

Dongdaemun Stadium, Seoul
Attendance: 10,871
Referee: Tony Boskovic (Australia)

24 May 1973

Hong Kong	1–0	South Vietnam
Yuen Kuen Chu 68'

Dongdaemun Stadium, Seoul
Attendance: 6,352
Referee: Aing Kim Ean (Khmer Republic)

==== Group B ====
Israel and South Korea advanced to the Zone A semi-finals.

===== Table =====
Pos	Team	Pld	W	D	L	GF	GA	GD	Pts	Qualification	Israel	South Korea	Malaysia	Thailand
1	Israel	3	2	1	0	9	0	+9	5	Advance to Zone A semi-finals	—	—	3–0	6–0
2	South Korea	3	1	2	0	4	0	+4	4	Advance to Zone A semi-finals	0–0	—	0–0	4–0
3	Malaysia	3	1	1	1	2	3	−1	3		—	—	—	2–0
4	Thailand	3	0	0	3	0	12	−12	0		—	—	—	—

Rules for classification: Tiebreakers

===== Matches =====
19 May 1973

Israel	3–0	Malaysia
Farkash 50'; Shum 62'; Onana 82'

Dongdaemun Stadium, Seoul
Attendance: 6,352
Referee: Aing Kim Ean (Khmer Republic)
19 May 1973

South Korea	4–0	Thailand
Kim Jae-han 52'; Cha Bum-kun 60'; Chung Kyu-poong 79', 84'

Dongdaemun Stadium, Seoul
Attendance: 6,352
Referee: Ruslan Hatta (Indonesia)

21 May 1973

South Korea	0–0	Malaysia

Dongdaemun Stadium, Seoul
Attendance: 5,554
Referee: U Tin Thut (Burma)
21 May 1973

Israel	6–0	Thailand
Borba 12'; Spiegler 62'; Shum 69'; Rozen 73', 84'; Onana 78'

Dongdaemun Stadium, Seoul
Attendance: 5,554
Referee: H. D. Dhillon (Singapore)

23 May 1973

South Korea	0–0	Israel

Dongdaemun Stadium, Seoul
Attendance: 35,000
Referee: U Tin Thut (Burma)
23 May 1973

Malaysia	2–0	Thailand
Abdullah 70'; Jusoh 89'

Dongdaemun Stadium, Seoul
Attendance: 6,222
Referee: Mahomed Azam (India)

=== Semi-finals ===
South Korea defeated Hong Kong 3–1 and Moshe Onana scored the only goal as Israel defeated Japan to advance to the Zone A final.

Zone A semi-finals
Team 1	Score	Team 2
Hong Kong	1–3	South Korea
Israel	1–0	Japan

==== Matches ====
26 May 1973

Hong Kong	1–3	South Korea
Yuen Kuen Chu 5'		Kim Jae-han 45'; Park Yi-chun 52'; Chung Kyu-poong 72'

Dongdaemun Stadium, Seoul
Attendance: 35,000
Referee: Ruslan Hatta (Indonesia)

26 May 1973

Israel	1–0 (a.e.t.)	Japan
Onana 110'

Dongdaemun Stadium, Seoul
Attendance: 6,008
Referee: H. D. Dhillon (Singapore)

=== Final ===
After a goalless draw in 90 minutes, Cha Bum-kun scored the only goal in extra time as South Korea defeated Israel to advance to the final round.

Zone A final
Team 1	Score	Team 2
South Korea	1–0 (a.e.t.)	Israel

==== Match ====
28 May 1973

South Korea	1–0 (a.e.t.)	Israel
Cha Bum-kun 109'

Dongdaemun Stadium, Seoul
Attendance: 6,213
Referee: U Tin Thut (Burma)

== Zone B ==
=== Group Stage ===
==== Group C ====
All matches were played in Tehran, Iran. Iran advanced to the Zone B final.

===== Table =====
Pos	Team	Pld	W	D	L	GF	GA	GD	Pts	Qualification		Syria	North Korea	Kuwait
1	Iran	6	4	1	1	7	3	+4	9	Advance to Zone B final	—	1–0	0–0	2–1
2	Syria	6	3	1	2	6	6	0	7		1–0	—	0–3	2–1
3	North Korea	6	1	3	2	5	5	0	5		1–2	1–1	—	0–0
4	Kuwait	6	1	1	4	4	8	−4	3		0–2	0–2	1–0	—

Rules for classification: Tiebreakers

===== Matches =====
4 May 1973
16:00 UTC+3:30

Syria	2–1	Kuwait
Chahrestan 62'; Nano 65'		Al Duraihem 57'

Aryamehr Stadium,Tehran
Attendance: 63,366
Referee: Hamza Ali Mirza (Bahrain)
4 May 1973
18:00 UTC+3:30

Iran	0–0	North Korea

Aryamehr Stadium, Tehran
Attendance: 63,366
Referee: M. Ramalingam (Malaysia)

6 May 1973
16:00 UTC+3:30

Syria	1–1	North Korea
Chahrestan 71'		Kim Jong-min 53'

Amjadieh Stadium,Tehran
Attendance: 11,940
Referee: Vijit Getkaew (Thailand)
6 May 1973
18:00 UTC+3:30

Iran	2–1	Kuwait
Vafakhah 23'; Parvin 56'		Kameel 83'

Amjadieh Stadium, Tehran
Attendance: 11,940
Referee: Er Wee Kiam (Malaysia)

8 May 1973
16:00 UTC+3:30

Kuwait	0–0	North Korea

Amjadieh Stadium, Tehran
Attendance: 22,362
Referee: Alex Vaz (India)
8 May 1973
18:00 UTC+3:30

Iran	1–0	Syria
Kargarjam 85'

Amjadieh Stadium, Tehran
Attendance: 6,028
Referee: Manit Sridaranop (Thailand)

11 May 1973
16:00 UTC+3:30

Iran	2–1	North Korea
Monajati 19'; Sadeghi 89'		Pak Sung-jin 48'

Aryamehr Stadium, Tehran
Attendance: 53,829
Referee: Ong Eng Young (Singapore)
11 May 1973
18:00 UTC+3:30

Syria	2–0	Kuwait
Said 18'; Chahrestan 90'

Aryamehr Stadium, Tehran
Attendance: 53,829
Referee: Hamza Ali Mirza (Bahrain)

13 May 1973
16:00 UTC+3:30

North Korea	3–0	Syria
An Se-uk 30'; Ma Jung-u 39', 77'

Amjadieh Stadium, Tehran
Attendance: 11,940
Referee: Alex Vaz (India)
13 May 1973
18:00 UTC+3:30

Iran	2–0	Kuwait
Ghelichkhani 60' (pen.); Djabari 74'

Amjadieh Stadium, Tehran
Attendance: 18,154
Referee: Manit Sridaranop (Thailand)

15 May 1973

Syria	1–0	Iran
Tatiche 12'

Amjadieh Stadium, Tehran
Attendance: 22,362
Referee: Sarkis Demirdjian (Lebanon)
15 May 1973

Kuwait	2–0	North Korea
Bo Hamad 31', 51'

Amjadieh Stadium, Tehran
Attendance: 6,028
Referee: Vijit Getkaew (Thailand)

==== Group D ====
All matches were played in Sydney and Melbourne, Australia except the first New Zealand v Australia match which was played in Auckland, New Zealand. Australia advanced to the Zone B final.

===== Table =====
Pos	Team	Pld	W	D	L	GF	GA	GD	Pts	Qualification	Australia	Iraq	Indonesia	New Zealand
1	Australia	6	3	3	0	15	6	+9	9	Advance to Zone B final	—	3–1	2–1	3–3
2	Iraq	6	3	2	1	11	6	+5	8		0–0	—	1–1	2–0
3	Indonesia	6	1	2	3	6	13	−7	4		0–6	2–3	—	1–0
4	New Zealand	6	0	3	3	5	12	−7	3		1–1	0–4	1–1	—

Rules for classification: Tiebreakers

===== Matches =====
4 March 1973

New Zealand	1–1	Australia
Turner 57'		Campbell 85'

Newmarket Ground, Auckland
Attendance: 12,000
Referee: Luk Tat Sun (Hong Kong)

11 March 1973

Indonesia	1–1	New Zealand
Panggabean 13'		Vest 74'

Sydney Sports Ground, Sydney
Attendance: 28,514
Referee: K Mahendran (Malaysia)

11 March 1973

Australia	3–1	Iraq
Richards 49'; Alston 80', 85'		Nouri 89'

Sydney Sports Ground, Sydney
Attendance: 28,514
Referee: Govindasamy Suppiah (Singapore)
13 March 1973

Iraq	2–0	New Zealand
Rashid 10'; Hatim 40'

Sydney Sports Ground, Sydney
Attendance: 12,763
Referee: Fernando Alvarez (Philippines)
13 March 1973

Australia	2–1	Indonesia
Campbell 23'; Alston 42'		Iswadi Idris 36'

Sydney Sports Ground, Sydney
Attendance: 12,763
Referee: Dau Van Dzu (South Vietnam)

16 March 1973

Iraq	1–1	Indonesia
Kadhim 23'		Iswadi Idris 43'

Sydney Sports Ground, Sydney
Attendance: 3,013
Referee: Kim Joo-Wom (South Korea)
16 March 1973

Australia	3–3	New Zealand
Utjesenovic 11'; Baartz 19'; Buljevic 26'		Vest 10'; Tindall 50'; Hogg 86' (o.g.)

Sydney Sports Ground, Sydney
Attendance: 14,071
Referee: K Mahendran (Malaysia)

18 March 1973

Australia	0–0	Iraq

Olympic Park, Melbourne
Attendance: 10,684
Referee: Masatoshi Nagashima (Japan)
18 March 1973

Indonesia	1–0	New Zealand
Tillotson 7' (o.g.)

Olympic Park, Melbourne
Attendance: 10,684
Referee: Govindasamy Suppiah (Singapore)

21 March 1973

Iraq	3–2	Indonesia
Aziz 22' (pen.); Obeid 33'; Hatim 72'		Panggabean 25'; Asmara 58'

Sydney Sports Ground, Sydney
Attendance: 11,730
Referee: Luk Tat Sun (Hong Kong)

24 March 1973

Iraq	4–0	New Zealand
Hatim 4', 15', 67'; Kadhim 23'

Sydney Sports Ground, Sydney
Attendance: 12,390
Referee: Kim Joo-Won (South Korea)
24 March 1973

Australia	6–0	Indonesia
Mackay 3', 40'; Abonyi 23', 54'; Richards 72'; Baartz 78'

Sydney Sports Ground, Sydney
Attendance: 12,390
Referee: Masatoshi Nagashima (Japan)

=== Final ===
Australia recorded a comfortable 3–0 win in the first leg in Sydney. Iran fought back in the second leg in Tehran but a brace from Parviz Ghelichkhani ultimately wasn't enough as Australia won 3–2 on aggregate.

Zone B final
Team 1	Agg.	Team 2	1st leg	2nd leg
Australia	3–2	Iran	3–0	0–2

==== First leg ====
18 August 1973

Australia	3–0	Iran
Alston 43'; Abonyi 45'; Wilson 83'

Sydney Sports Ground, Sydney
Attendance: 30,881
Referee: Rudolf Scheurer (Switzerland)

==== Second leg ====
24 August 1973

Iran	2–0	Australia
Ghelichkhani 14', 32'

Aryamehr Stadium, Tehran
Attendance: 55,997
Referee: Pavel Kazakov (Soviet Union)

== Final round ==
After both legs ended in draws, a play-off was organised on neutral ground in Hong Kong to determine which team would qualify. Jimmy Mackay scored the only goal of the play-off as Australia defeated South Korea 1–0 to qualify for the 1974 FIFA World Cup.

Final round
Team 1	Agg.	Team 2	1st leg	2nd leg	Play-off
Australia	2–2	South Korea	0–0	2–2	1–0

=== First leg ===
28 October 1973

Australia	0–0	South Korea

Sydney Sports Ground, Sydney
Attendance: 32,005
Referee: Loraux (Belgium)

=== Second leg ===
10 November 1973

South Korea	2–2	Australia
Kim Jae-han 15'; Ko Jae-wook 27'		Buljevic 29'; Baartz 48'

Dongdaemun Stadium, Seoul
Attendance: 32,000
Referee: Van Gemert (Netherlands)

=== Play-off ===
13 November 1973

Australia	1–0	South Korea
Mackay 70'

Government Stadium, Hong Kong
Attendance: 27,284
Referee: Van Gemert (Netherlands)

== Qualified teams ==
Australia qualified for the first time, becoming the first team from Oceania to do so.

Team	Qualified as	Qualified on	Previous appearances in FIFA World Cup
Australia	Final round winners	13 November 1973	0 (debut)

== Goalscorers ==
There were 101 goals scored in 44 matches, for an average of 2.3 goals per match.

5 goals

- (Iraq) Sabah Hatim
- (Israel) Moshe Onana

4 goals

- (Australia) Adrian Alston

3 goals

- (Australia) Attila Abonyi
- (Australia) Ray Baartz
- (Australia) Jimmy Mackay
- (Iran) Parviz Ghelichkhani
- (South Korea) Chung Kyu-poong
- (South Korea) Kim Jae-han
- (Syria) Joseph Chahrestan

2 goals

- (Australia) Branko Buljevic
- (Australia) Ernie Campbell
- (Australia) Ray Richards
- (Hong Kong) Yuen Kuen Chu
- (Indonesia) Iswadi Idris
- (Indonesia) Sarman Panggabean
- (Iraq) Ali Kadhim
- (Israel) Zvi Rozen
- (Israel) Itzhak Shum
- (Japan) Kunishige Kamamoto
- (Kuwait) Hamad Bo Hamad
- (New Zealand) Alan Vest
- (North Korea) Ma Jung-u
- (South Korea) Cha Bum-kun

1 goal

- (Australia) Doug Utjesenovic
- (Australia) Peter Wilson
- (Hong Kong) Kwok Ka Ming
- (Hong Kong) Lo Hung Hoi
- (Indonesia) Andjas Asmara
- (Iran) Ali Jabbari
- (Iran) Akbar Kargarjam
- (Iran) Mehdi Monajati
- (Iran) Ali Parvin
- (Iran) Mohammad Sadeghi
- (Iran) Gholam Vafakhah
- (Iraq) Douglas Aziz
- (Iraq) Riyadh Nouri
- (Iraq) Bashar Rashid
- (Iraq) Salah Obeid
- (Israel) George Borba
- (Israel) Zvi Farkash
- (Israel) Mordechai Spiegler
- (Japan) Shusaku Hirasawa
- (Japan) Koji Mori
- (Kuwait) Ibrahim Al Duraihem
- (Kuwait) Fathi Kameel
- (Malaysia) Shaharuddin Abdullah
- (Malaysia) Harun Jusoh
- (New Zealand) Dennis Tindall
- (New Zealand) Brian Turner
- (North Korea) An Se-uk
- (North Korea) Kim Jong-min
- (North Korea) Pak Sung-jin
- (South Korea) Ko Jae-wook
- (South Korea) Park Yi-chun
- (Syria) Nabil Nano
- (Syria) Samir Said
- (Syria) Abdulghani Tatiche

1 own goal

- (Australia) Bobby Hogg (playing against New Zealand)
- (New Zealand) Maurice Tillotson (playing against Indonesia)
- (South Vietnam) Nguyễn Vinh Quang (playing against Japan)
- (Thailand) Supakit Meelarpkit (playing against South Vietnam)
