= List of leading goalscorers for the Nigeria national football team =

This List of leading goalscorers for the Nigeria national football team contains football players who have played for the Nigeria national team and is listed according to their number of goals scored. The Nigeria national football team represents the nation of Nigeria in international football. It is fielded by the Nigeria Football Federation and competes as a member of Confederation of African Football.

== Players ==
- Goals and appearances are composed of FIFA World Cup and Africa Cup of Nations matches, as well as numerous international friendly tournaments and matches. Players marked in **bold** are still active and eligible (meaning they have not retired) to play for the national team.

Statistics correct as of the Africa Cup of Nations qualifier against Sao Tome and Principe on 13 June 2022 Position key: GK – Goalkeeper; DF – Defender; MF – Midfielder; FW – Forward

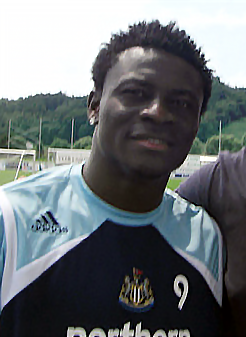
Obafemi Martins (18 goals) played his last match for the national team in a 2-0 victory in a World Cup Qualifier against Swaziland on November 17, 2015.

#	Name	Position	National team career	Goals	Caps	Average
1	Rashidi Yekini	FW	1984–1998	37	62	0.60
2	**Victor Osimhen**	FW	2017-	35	46	0.76
3	Segun Odegbami	FW	1976–1982	23	46	0.50
4	Yakubu	FW	2000– 2012	21	57	0.36
5	Ikechukwu Uche	FW	2007–2015	19	46	0.41
6	Obafemi Martins	FW	2004–2015	18	48	0.37
7	Sunday Oyarekhua	FW	1971–1976	17	28	0.60
8	Samson Siasia	FW	1984–1999	16	51	0.31
9	Odion Ighalo	FW	2015–2022	16	37	0.31
9	Ahmed Musa	FW	2010–	16	107	0.15
11	Julius Aghahowa	FW	2000–2007	14	32	0.43
12	Jay Jay Okocha	MF	1993–2006	14	75	0.18
13	Daniel Amokachi	FW	1990–1999	13	44	0.29
14	**Kelechi Iheanacho**	FW	2015-	13	43	0.28
15	Victor Obinna	FW	2005–2014	12	48	0.25
16	Mudashiru Lawal	MF	1975–1985	12	86	0.14
17	Nwankwo Kanu	FW/MF	1994–2011	12	87	0.13
18	**Ademola Lookman**	FW/MF	2019-	11	37	0.29
19	Victor Moses	FW	2012-	12	28	0.36
20	**Alex Iwobi**	MF	2015-	10	59	0.17
21	Peter Odemwingie	FW	2002–2014	10	63	0.15
22	Emmanuel Amunike	FW	1993–2001	9	27	0.33
23	Emmanuel Emenike	FW	2011–2015	9	37	0.24
24	Stephen Keshi	DF	1981–1995	9	64	0.14
25	Benedict Akwuegbu	FW	2000–2005	8	30	0.27
26	Victor Ikpeba	FW	1992–2002	7	31	0.22
27	Joseph Yobo	DF	2001–2014	7	101	0.07
28	Humphrey Edobor	FW	1984–1989	7		
29	John Utaka	FW	2002–2014	6	43	0.14
30	Mutiu Adepoju	MF	1990–2002	6	48	0.13
31	Finidi George	FW	1991–2002	6	62	0.09

== See also ==
- Nigeria national football team#Players
