= 1970 African Cup of Champions Clubs =

Tournament details
- Dates: April 1970 - 24 January 1971
- Teams: 23 (from 1 confederation)

Final positions
- Champions: (Ghana) Asante Kotoko (1st title)
- Runners-up: (Democratic Republic of the Congo) TP Englebert

Tournament statistics
- Matches played: 42
- Goals scored: 145 (3.45 per match)
- Top scorer: (Democratic Republic of the Congo) Pierre Kalala (4 goals)

The African Cup of Champions Clubs 1970 was the 6th edition of the annual international club football competition held in the CAF region (Africa), the African Cup of Champions Clubs. It determined that year's club champion of association football in Africa.

The tournament was played by 23 teams and used a knock-out format with ties played home and away. Asante Kotoko from Ghana won the final, and became CAF club champion for the first time.

== First round ==
Team 1	Agg.	Team 2	1st leg	2nd leg
Aigle Royal (Gabon)	5–5^{1}	(Republic of the Congo) CARA Brazzaville	0–3	5–2
CR Belcourt (Algeria)	5–5^{2}	(Senegal) ASC Jeanne d'Arc	5–3	0–2^{2}
Lavori Publici (Somalia)	4–5	(Uganda) Prisons FC Kampala	2–1	2–4
AS Real Bamako (Mali)	5–2	(Republic of Upper Volta) AS Fonctionnaires	3–0	2–2
Secteur 6 FC (Niger)	2–3	(Cameroon) Union Douala	0–2	2–1
Stationery Stores (Nigeria)	6–3	(Republic of Dahomey) Forces Armées	3–1	3–2
Young Africans (Tanzania)	6–4	(Madagascar) US Fonctionnaires	4–0	2–4

^{1} CARA Brazzaville won after drawing of lots.
^{2} CR Belcourt withdrew after the first leg.

== Second round ==
Team 1	Agg.	Team 2	1st leg	2nd leg
AS Real Bamako (Mali)	4–9	(Ivory Coast) Stade d'Abidjan	2–3	2–6
TP Englebert (Democratic Republic of the Congo)	5–2	(Republic of the Congo) CARA Brazzaville	3–0	2–2
AS Kaloum Star (Guinea)	4–3	(Senegal) ASC Jeanne d'Arc	3–1	1–2
Ismaily (United Arab Republic)	1–0	(Sudan) Al-Hilal Club	1–0	0–0
Nakuru All Stars (Kenya)	2–3	(Tanzania) Young Africans	1–0	1–3
Prisons FC Kampala (Uganda)	4–4^{1}	(Ethiopia) Tele SC Asmara	3–2	1–2
Union Douala (Cameroon)	1–1^{1}	(Togo) Modèle Lomé	0–0	1–1
Stationery Stores (Nigeria)	3–3	(Ghana) Asante Kotoko	3–2	0–1^{2}

^{1} Prisons FC Kampala and Modèle Lomé won after drawing of lots.
^{2} Leading 1-0 in the second half of extra time, Asante Kotoko were awarded a penalty. Stationery Stores refused to let the penalty be taken and the match was abandoned. CAF ruled that Asante Kotoko should be considered the winners of the tie.

== Quarter-finals ==
Team 1	Agg.	Team 2	1st leg	2nd leg
Stade d'Abidjan (Ivory Coast)	4–5	(Guinea) AS Kaloum Star	1–1	3–4
Modèle Lomé (Togo)	1–3	(Democratic Republic of the Congo) TP Englebert	0–0	1–3
Ismaily (United Arab Republic)	6–2	(Uganda) Prisons FC Kampala	4–1	2–1
Young Africans (Tanzania)	1–3	(Ghana) Asante Kotoko	1–1	0–2

== Semi-finals ==
Team 1	Agg.	Team 2	1st leg	2nd leg
AS Kaloum Star (Guinea)	2–5	(Democratic Republic of the Congo) TP Englebert	1–2	1–3
Ismaily (United Arab Republic)	0–2	(Ghana) Asante Kotoko	0–0	0–2

== Final ==
10 January 1971
--:-- UTC+0

Asante Kotoko (Ghana)	1–1	(Democratic Republic of the Congo) TP Englebert
Gariba 34'		Kalala 50'

Kumasi Stadium, Kumasi
24 January 1971
--:-- UTC+1

TP Englebert (Democratic Republic of the Congo)	1–2	(Ghana) Asante Kotoko
Tshinabu 19'		Gariba 12'; Jabir 80'

20 May Stadium, Kinshasa

TP Englebert	Asante Kotoko

== Champion ==
African Cup of Champions Clubs
1970 Winners

Asante Kotoko
First Title

== Top scorers ==
The top scorers from the 1970 African Cup of Champions Clubs are as follows:

Rank	Name	Team	Goals
1	(Democratic Republic of the Congo) Pierre Kalala	(Democratic Republic of the Congo) TP Englebert	4
2	(Algeria) Hacène Lalmas	(Algeria) CR Belcourt	3
2	(Democratic Republic of the Congo) Kamunda Tshinabu	(Democratic Republic of the Congo) TP Englebert	3
2	(United Arab Republic) Abdou El-Hamalawi	(United Arab Republic) Ismaily	3
5	(Democratic Republic of the Congo) André Kalonzo	(Democratic Republic of the Congo) TP Englebert	2
5	(Ghana) Abukari Gariba	(Ghana) Asante Kotoko	2
5	(Ghana) Malik Jabir	(Ghana) Asante Kotoko	2
5	(United Arab Republic) Ali Abo Greisha	(United Arab Republic) Ismaily	2
