= Mehdi Monajati =

Iranian footballer and coach

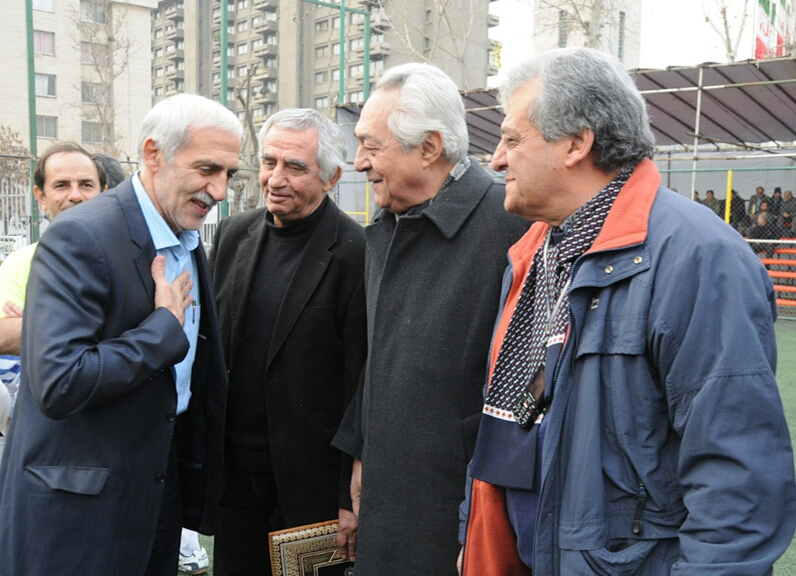
- Right: Homayoun Behzadi - Faramarz Zelli - Mehdi Monajati - Mohammad Dadkan in 2012

Personal information
- Full name: Mehdi Monajati
- Date of birth: 29 June 1947 (age 79)
- Place of birth: Tehran, Iran
- Height: 1.78 m (5 ft 10 in)
- Position: Defender

Senior career*
Years	Team	Apps	(Gls)
1966–1981	Pas		

International career
1969–1974	Iran	15	(1)

Managerial career
- 1989: Iran
- 1999–2002: Iran U-23
- * Club domestic league appearances and goals

Mehdi Monajati (Persian: مهدی مناجاتی, born 29 June 1947) is a retired Iranian footballer and Coach.

== Club career ==
Monajati started his professional football career with Pas Tehran in his homeland in Tehran. He played his whole football career with Pas Tehran playing with the team for 15 years. In five of his career with Pas he played was a Team meli player.

== International career ==
Monajati debuted for the Iran national football team on 13 September 1969 in a friendly match against Pakistan which ended 4-2 victory for Iran. He played his next two games against Turkey. Monajati then debuted his first FIFA tournament by competing against Denmark in 1972 Summer Olympics which ended a 0-4 loss. He also played three 1974 FIFA World cup qualifying matches which two of them was a win for Iran, in those three matches he did manage to score a goal against North Korea. His 15th and last match was a friendly match against Czechoslovakia which ended a 0-1 loss.

== Management career ==
Monajati was appointed as Team meli Head Coach in 1989, the job last only months after he just managed 3 matches, his side beat Thailand 3-0 but losing to China 0-2 in Shenyang but they later beat them 3-2 in Tehran. He left the Iranian national team after he failed to qualify Iran for the 1990 FIFA World Cup.

== Career statistics ==
As of 22 July 1989.

Team	From	To								
Team	From	To	G	W	D	L	Win %	GF	GA	GD
Iran	30 May 1989	22 July 1989	3	2	0	1	66.67	6	4	+2

=== International goals ===
#	Date	Venue	Opponent	Score	Result	Competition
1	11 May 1973	Tehran, Iran	North Korea	2–1	Win	1974 FIFA World Cup qualification
