= Salah Obeid =

Iraqi footballer

Personal information
- Full name: Salah Obeid
- Place of birth: Iraq
- Position: Forward

Senior career*
Years	Team	Apps	(Gls)
- Al-Quwa Al-Jawiya

International career
1971–1974	Iraq		
- * Club domestic league appearances and goals

Salah Obeid (Arabic: صَلَاح عُبَيْد) is a former Iraqi football forward who played for Iraq in the 1974 FIFA World Cup qualification.

== Career statistics ==
=== International goals ===
Scores and results list Iraq's goal tally first.

No	Date	Venue	Opponent	Score	Result	Competition
1.	21 March 1973	Sydney Sports Ground, Sydney	Indonesia	2–1	3–2	1974 FIFA World Cup qualification
