= Daniel Imbert =

Mauritian footballer (1952–2016)

Dany Imbert
- Dany Imbert at the 1978 Indian Ocean Cup

Personal information
- Full name: Daniel Jean Robert Imbert
- Date of birth: December 17, 1952
- Place of birth: Mauritius
- Date of death: 15 March 2016 (aged 63)
- Place of death: Quatre Bornes, Mauritius
- Height: 5 ft 3 in (1.60 m)
- Position: Forward

Youth career
- Collège du Saint-Esprit

Senior career*
Years	Team	Apps	(Gls)
1974–1983	Racing Club		

International career^{‡}
1972–1983	Mauritius	53	(17)
- * Club domestic league appearances and goals ‡ National team caps and goals as of 10 February 2017

Daniel "Dany" Imbert (December 17, 1952 – March 15, 2016) was a Mauritian football player who played as a forward for Racing Club and the Mauritius national football team.

== Early life ==
Dany's father, a nurse, moved to London taking Dany with him where he was noticed by his school coach and encouraged to join Chelsea's junior team however he was not allowed to remain in England, returning to Mauritius in 1969, reluctantly.

== International career ==
Dany is the only Mauritian international to have scored at the African Cup of Nations, as part of the 1974 squad nicknamed the "Elahee Boys" after their manager Mohammad Anwar Elahee. He is Mauritius' all-time top goal scorer with 17 goals in 53 matches.

== After football ==
Upon retirement he worked at Mauritius Commercial Bank.

He died of a stroke on March 15, 2016, at 63 years old at a hospital near Quatre Bornes in Mauritius.

== Career statistics ==
=== International goals ===
Scores and results list Mauritius' goal tally first.

No	Date	Venue	Opponent	Score	Result	Competition
1.	21 May 1972	Stade George V, Curepipe, Mauritius	Uganda	1–2	1–2	Friendly
2.	25 May 1972	Stade George V, Curepipe, Mauritius	Uganda	1–2	1–2	Friendly
3.	10 December 1972	Stade George V, Curepipe, Mauritius	Kenya	1–0	1–3	1974 FIFA World Cup qualification
4.	17 December 1972	Nairobi City Stadium, Nairobi, Kenya	Kenya	2–2	2–2	1974 FIFA World Cup qualification
5.	13 January 1974	Stade George V, Curepipe, Mauritius	Malawi	4–1	4–1	Friendly
6.	20 January 1974	Stade George V, Curepipe, Mauritius	Malawi	4–1	4–1	Friendly
7.	20 January 1974	Stade George V, Curepipe, Mauritius	Malawi	4–1	4–1	Friendly
8.	5 March 1974	Ala'ab Damanhour Stadium, Damanhur, Egypt	Guinea	1–2	1–2	1974 African Cup of Nations
9.	7 March 1974	Ala'ab Damanhour Stadium, Damanhur, Egypt	Zaire	1–3	1–4	1974 African Cup of Nations
10.	1 July 1976	Stade Linité, Victoria, Seychelles	Kenya	3–4	3–4	Friendly
11.	2 July 1976	Stade Linité, Victoria, Seychelles	Réunion	2–0	2–0	Friendly
12.	31 October 1976	Stade George V, Curepipe, Mauritius	Malawi	3–2	3–2	1978 African Cup of Nations qualification
13.	24 January 1978	Stade George V, Curepipe, Mauritius	Malawi	1–2	1–2	1978 All-Africa Games qualification
14.	24 September 1978	Stade Jean-Ivoula, Saint-Denis, Réunion	Réunion	2–0	2–0	1978 Indian Ocean Cup
15.	24 September 1978	Stade Jean-Ivoula, Saint-Denis, Réunion	Réunion	3–2	2–0	1978 Indian Ocean Cup
16.	5 September 1982	Stade Jean-Ivoula, Saint-Denis, Réunion	Réunion	1–1	1–1	1982 Indian Ocean Tournament
17.	24 April 1983	Stade George V, Curepipe, Mauritius	Ethiopia	1–0	1–0	1984 African Cup of Nations qualification
