= US Fonctionnaires =

Malagasy football club

- Full name: Union Sportive des Fonctionnaires
- Ground: Mahamasina Stadium; Antananarivo, Madagascar
- Capacity: 22,000
- Manager: Sander Robson
- League: Malagasy Second Division

Union Sportive des Fonctionnaires is a Malagasy football club based in Antananarivo, Madagascar. The team has won the THB Champions League in 1969, qualifying them for the 1970 African Cup of Champions Clubs.

The team currently plays in the Malagasy Second Division.

== Achievements ==
- THB Champions League

Champion (1): 1969

== Performance in CAF competitions ==
- CAF Champions League: 1 appearance

1970 – first round
