= Obby =

Obby (/ˈɒb.i/) may refer to:

- Hobby horses, as in the slang phrase "'obby 'oss" (e.g., the 'Obby 'Oss festival)
- Obby Khan, Canadian football player
- Obby Kapita (died 2002), Zambian football player and coach
- An obstacle course, especially in videogames
- Obsidian, especially in videogames
