= Kamunda Tshinabu =

Congolese footballer (1948–2002)

Personal information
- Full name: Martin Kamunda Tshinabu
- Date of birth: 8 May 1946
- Place of birth: Belgian Congo
- Date of death: 2 May 2002 (aged 55)
- Position: Midfielder

Senior career*
Years	Team	Apps	(Gls)
1963–1965	CS Benfica de Kolwezi		
1965–1979	TP Mazembe		

International career
1970–1974	Zaire	9	(1)

Managerial career
- 1983: TP Mazembe
Medal record
Men's Football
Representing Zaire
Africa Cup of Nations
Winner	1974 Egypt
- * Club domestic league appearances and goals

Martin "Brinch" Kamunda Tshinabu (8 May 1946 – 2 May 2002) was a Congolese football midfielder and manager who played for Zaire in the 1974 FIFA World Cup. He also played for TP Mazembe.

== Career statistics ==
=== International ===
Appearances and goals by national team and year
National team	Year	Apps	Goals
Zaire	1970	1	0
Zaire	1972	5	0
Zaire	1973	1	1
Zaire	1974	2	0
Total		9	1

Scores and results list Zaire's goal tally first, score column indicates score after each Tshinabu goal.

List of international goals scored by Kamunda Tshinabu
No.	Date	Venue	Cap	Opponent	Score	Result	Competition	Ref.
1.	27 February 1973	Stade Tata Raphaël, Kinshasa, Zaire	5	Cameroon	2–0	2–0	1974 FIFA World Cup qualification	

== Honours ==
TP Mazembe

- Linafoot/Coupe du Congo (DR Congo): 1966, 1967, 1969, 1976; runner-up 1972, 1978
- African Cup of Champions Clubs: 1967, 1968; runner-up 1969, 1970
- LIFKAT (Katanga Province): 1966
- EUFLU (Lubumbashi): 1966, 1968, 1971, 1973, 1975, 1976, 1977, 1978

Zaire

- African Cup of Nations: 1974
