= Ala'ab Damanhour Stadium =

Stadium in Damanhour, Egypt

Coordinates: 31°02′15″N 30°27′25″E

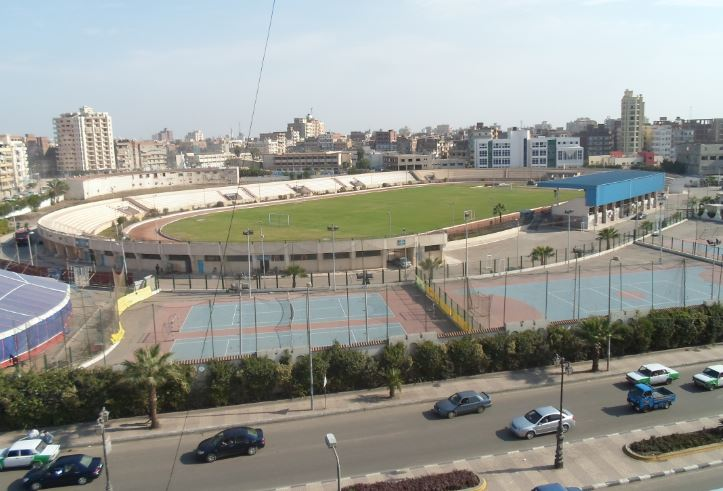
- Interactive map of Ala'ab Damanhour Stadium
- Full name: Ala'ab Damanhour Stadium
- Location: Damanhour, Egypt
- Capacity: 8,000

Construction
- Opened: 1961

Tenant
- Ala'ab Damanhour

Ala'ab Damanhour Stadium (Arabic: ستاد ألعاب دمنهور) is a multi-use stadium in Damanhour, Egypt. It is mostly used for football matches and is the home stadium of Ala'ab Damanhour. The stadium has a capacity of 8,000 spectators.

During the 1974 African Cup of Nations, the stadium hosted three group stage matches.
