= Metelis (Kom el-Ahmer) =

Coordinates: 31.161723°N 30.448791°E

Metelis (Kom el-Ahmer) (Ancient Greek: Μέτηλις, Egyptian:Mtlꜣ, Per-Ha-neb-Imenti) was a city in ancient Egypt. Its archaeological site is located in the Beheira Governorate of the Western Nile Delta, about 44 km southeast of Alexandria, and 7 km west of El Mahmoudiyah. It belonged to the Metelite nome (the 7th nome of Lower Egypt), of which it was the capital.

The city was located between the Canopic and the Bolbitine (later the Rosetta) estuaries of the Nile in the northwestern part of the delta.

Starting in 2012, a joint mission under the direction of the Università di Siena and the CAIE (Italian Egyptian Archaeological Centre) have investigated this area. Recent excavations in collaboration with different Egyptian institutions have uncovered rich multi-period remains spanning from the Late Dynastic and Hellenistic eras through the Roman and early Islamic periods.

The Kom al-Ahmer/Kom Wasit Archaeological Project currently investigates two inter-connected archaeological sites in this area.

The Kom al-Ahmer site yielded Roman bath remnants, storage buildings for amphorae, hundreds of ancient coins, and an early Islamic cemetery.

== Kom Wasit ==
The older site of Kom Wasit is located about 2km northwest from el-Ahmer. It features a massive mudbrick enclosure wall containing Hellenistic houses, and Greek pottery dating back to the 7th century BC. A large temple precinct was identified there by ongoing excavations.

Around 1st century AD, Kom Wasit was mostly abandoned, with the population moving to al-Ahmer.

The shores of Lake Idku (Edkou) kept shifting over the centuries and, in ancient times, probably reached both sites. The waters of the lake provided communications, and linked with nearby waterways; the other settlements, including Rosetta on the Mediterranean sea were thus reachable by ship.

The course of the nearby Rosetta branch of the Nile also frequently kept shifting over the centuries. The scholars theorize that this shifting landscape was responsible for the abandonment of Kom Wasit around 1st century AD, with the population moving to al-Ahmer.

The site of Kom al-Ghoraf is located about 6km north from the al-Ahmer area, and it is believed that it was also related to al-Ahmer and Wasit.

Coptic records show bishops of Metelis from AD 325 to 743; the Arabic records also indicate occupation into the 14th century AD.

== See also ==
- Nome (Egypt)

== Bibliography ==
- Ilaria Rossetti 2013, Kom al-Ahmer I (Antica Metelis?). Rapporto preliminare sulle missioni 2008-2012. - archive.org
- López, Ariel G. (2023-08-01). "The Western Delta in Late Antiquity". Studies in Late Antiquity. 7 (3): 445–473. doi:10.1525/sla.2023.7.3.445. ISSN 2470-2048.
- Michele Asolati 2016, Coin finds from Kom al-Ahmer & Kom Wasit, near Alexandria, Egypt (2012-2015). - researchgate.net
- Mohamed Kenawi 2019 (ed), Kom al-Ahmer – Kom Wasit I Excavations in the Metelite Nome, Egypt ca. 700 BC – AD 1000. www.archaeopress.com - academia.edu
- Adam Jones 2025, A Window Into an Ancient Delta Powerhouse: New Discoveries at Kom El-Ahmar and Kom Wasit. - medium.com
