= Damanhur =

Damanhur دمنهور
- City
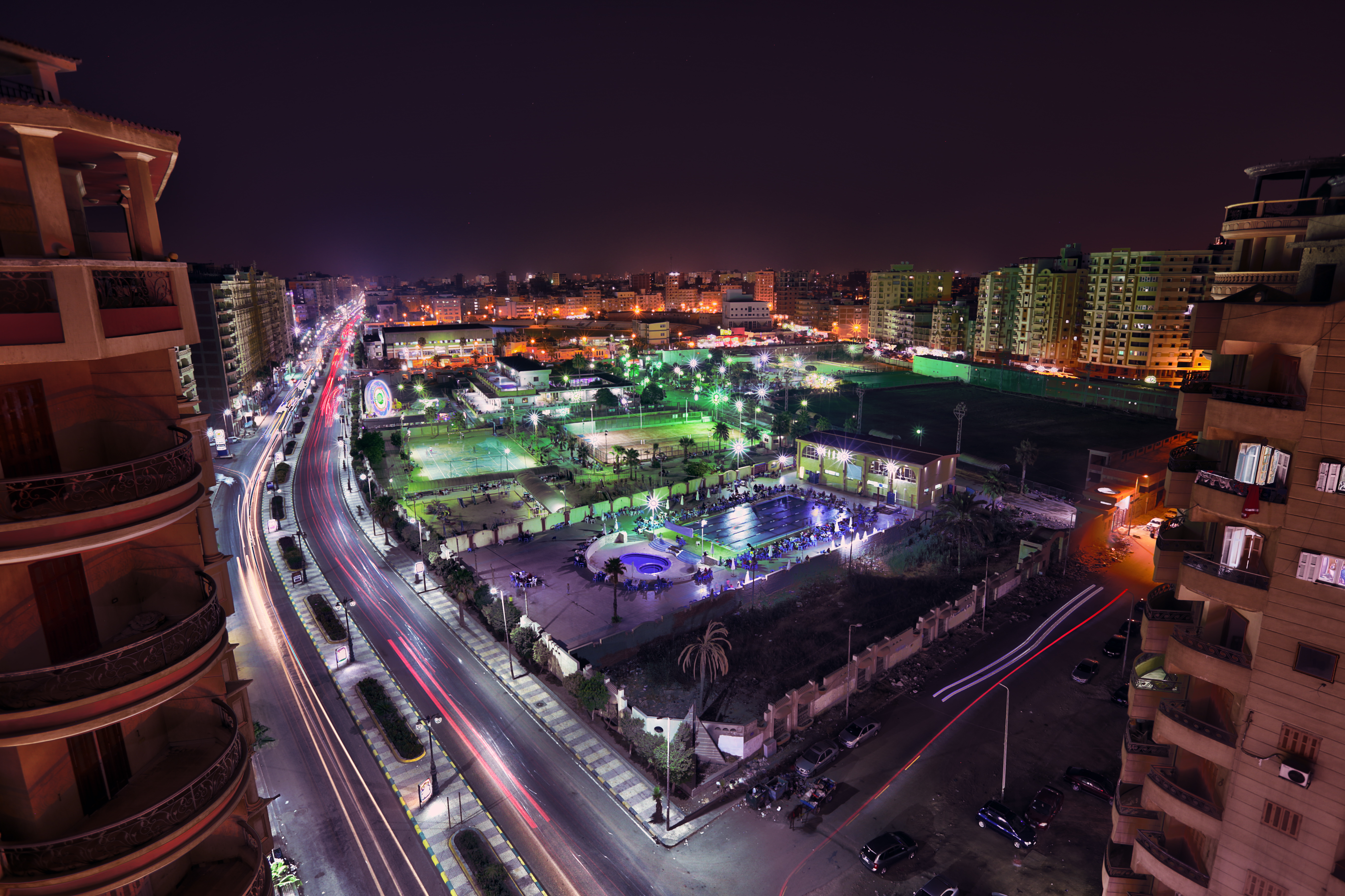
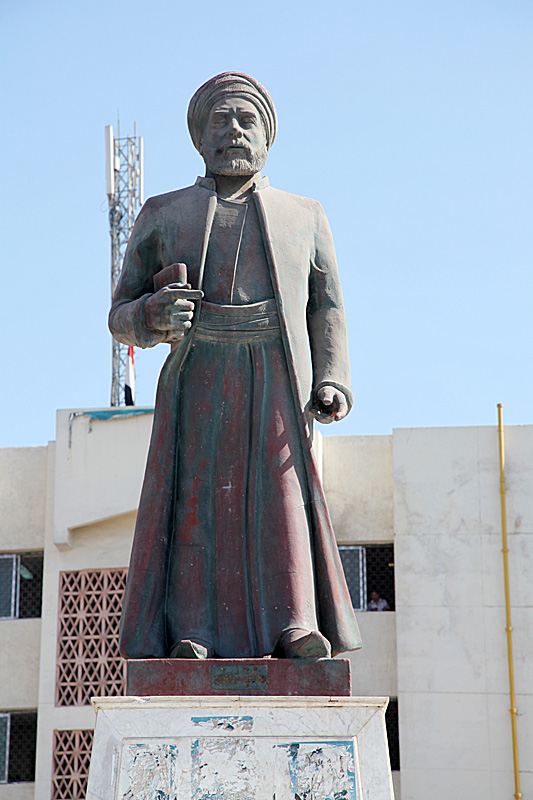
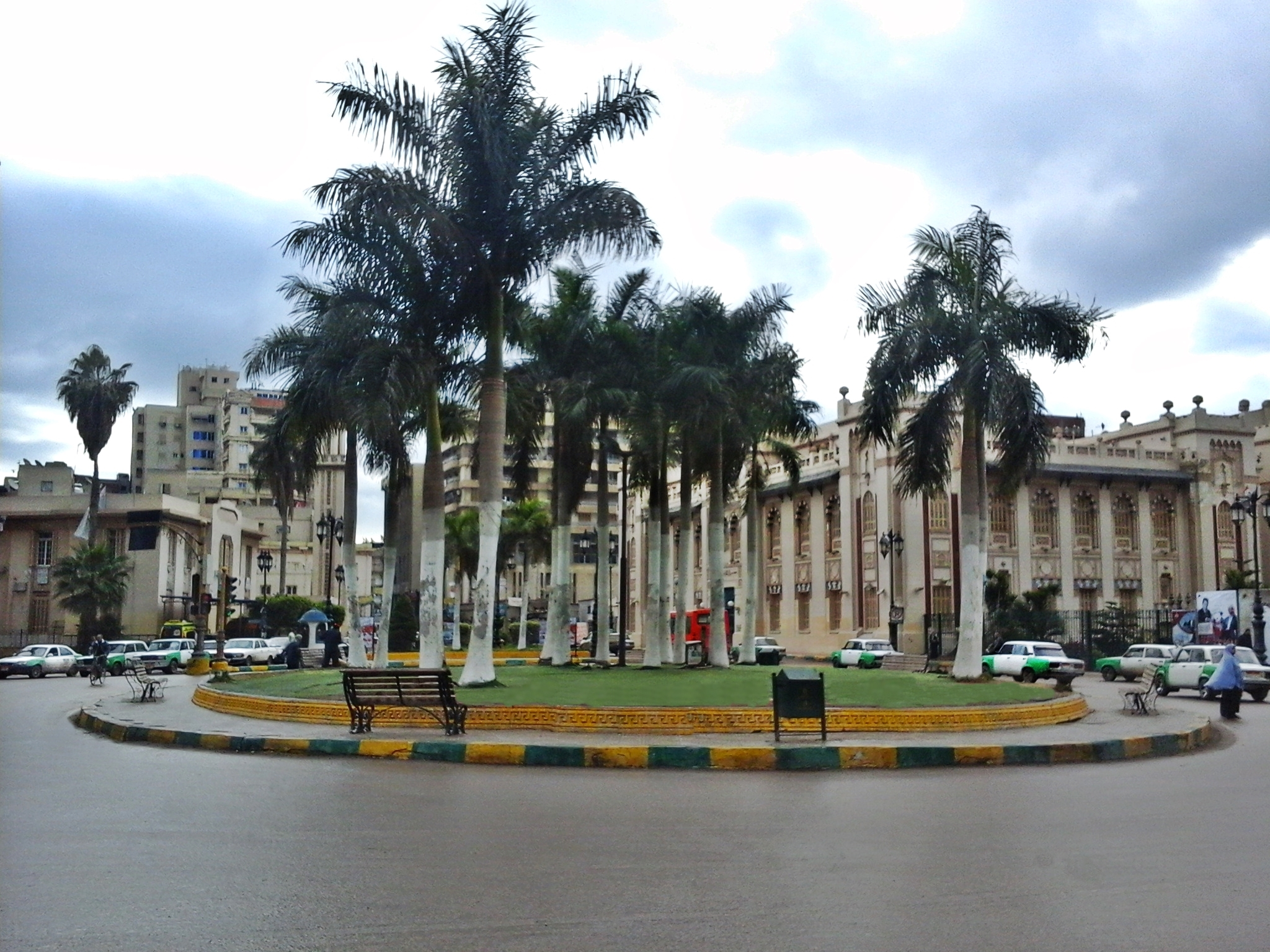
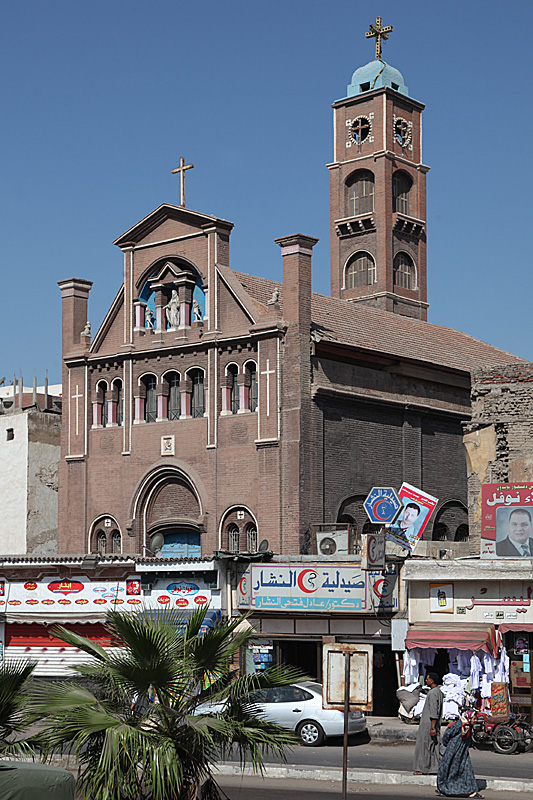
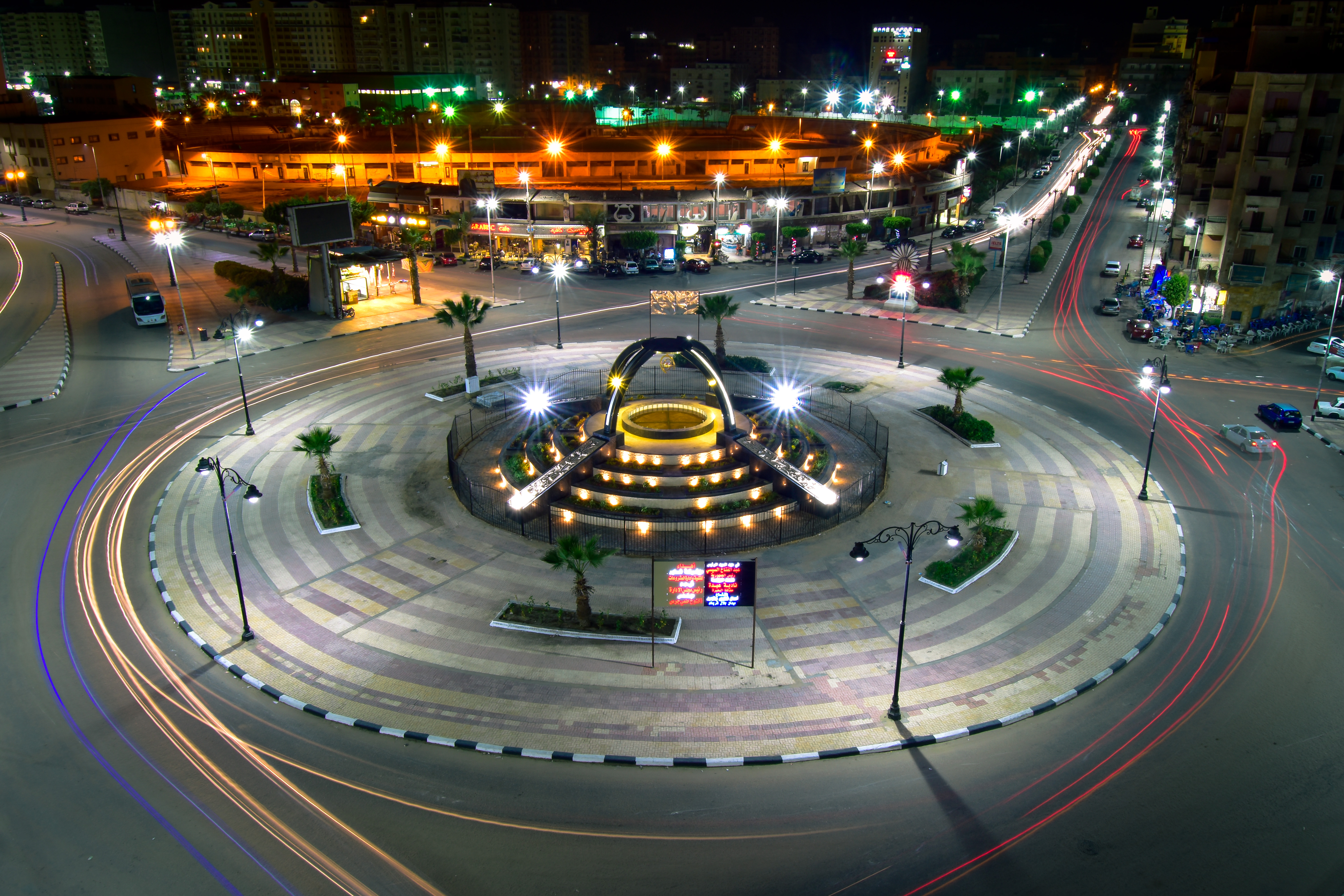
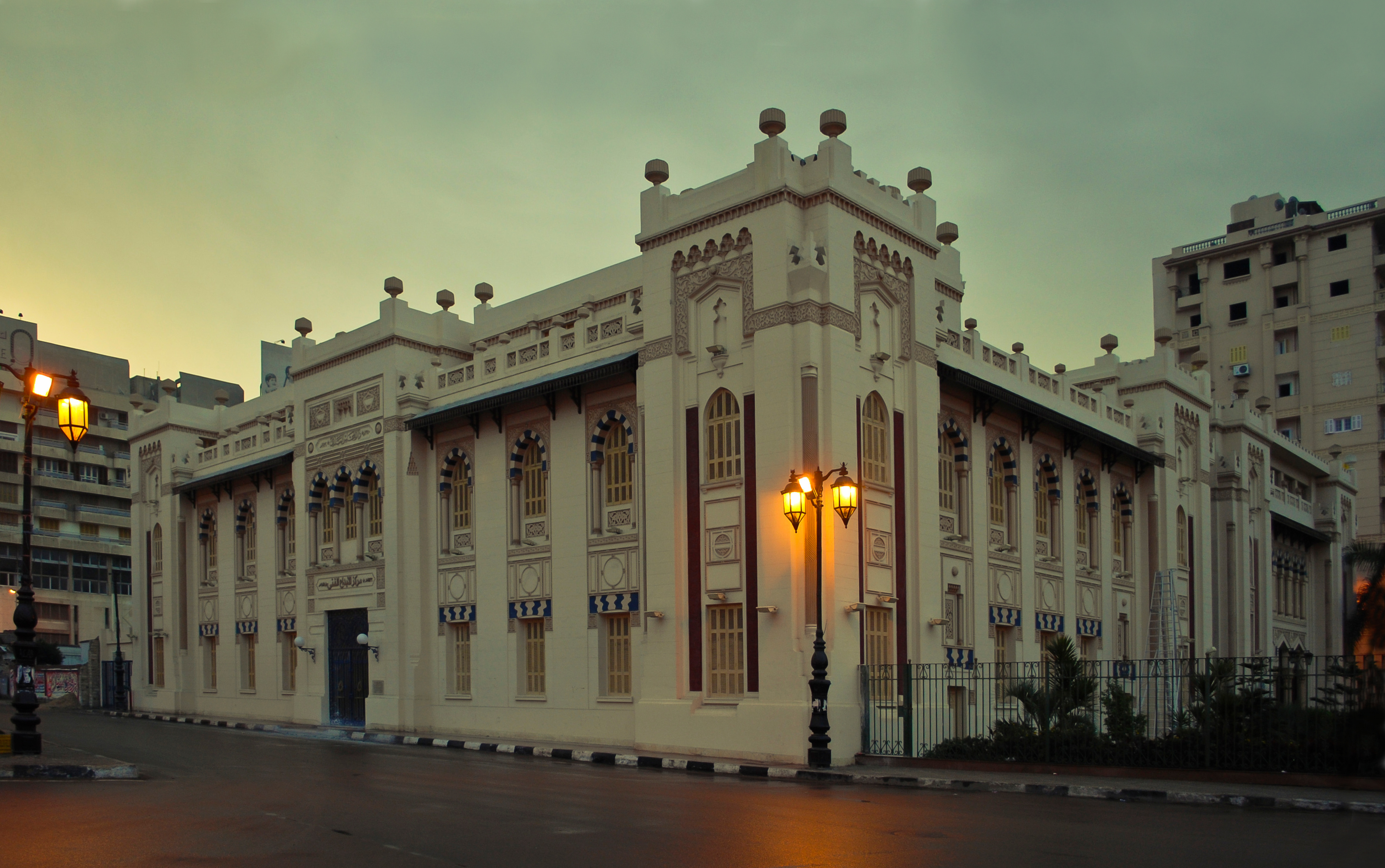
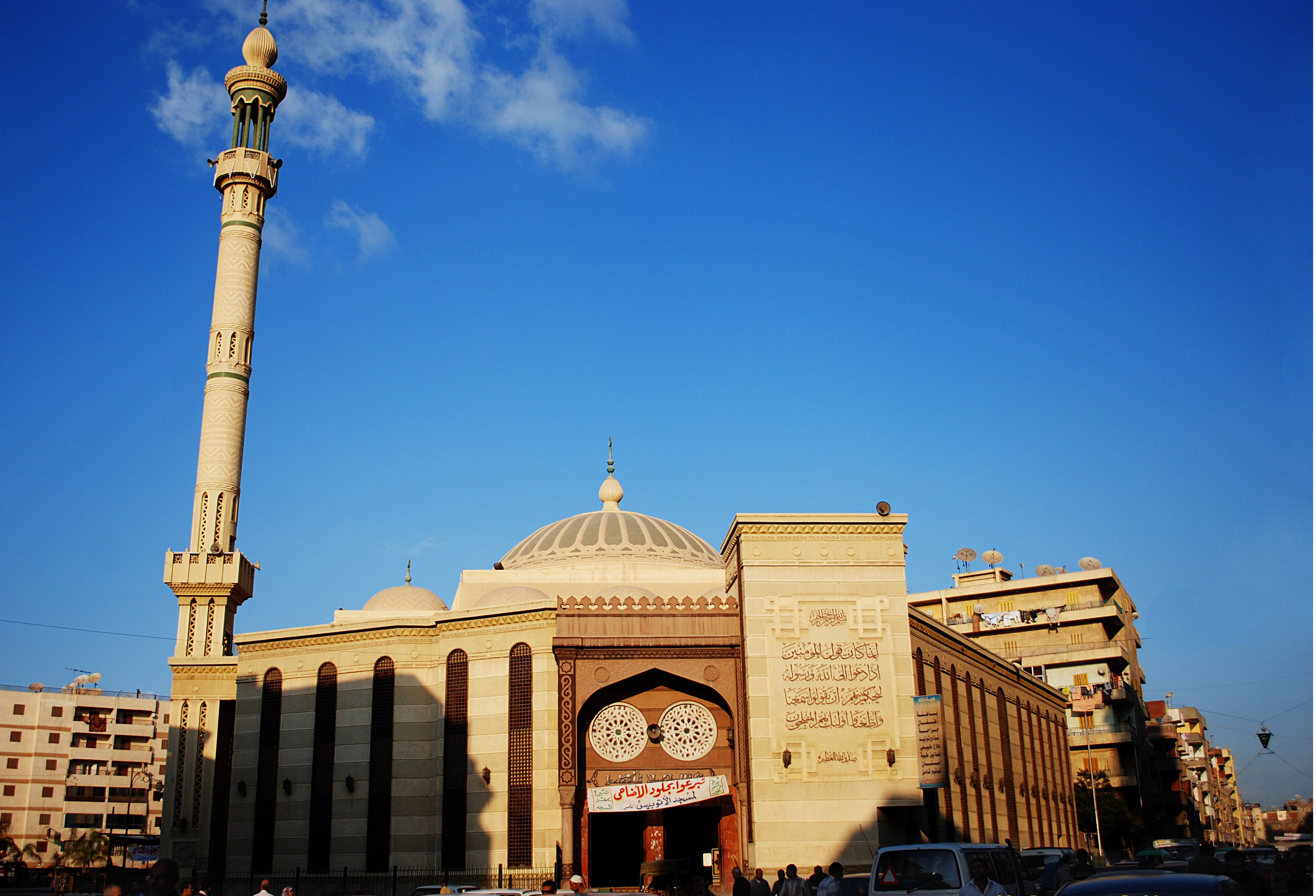
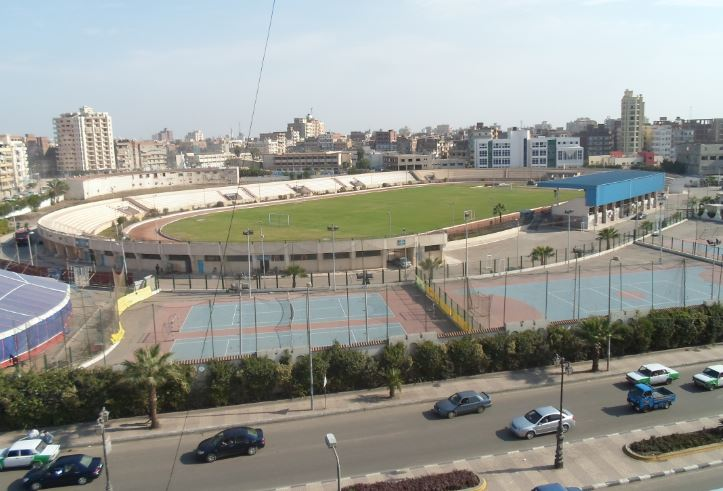
- Downtown Damanhur Mohamed Abdu Statue Opera Square Terra Santa Church Galal Keraitam Square Damanhur Opera House Autobus Mosque Ala'ab Damanhour Stadium

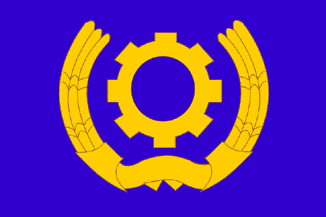
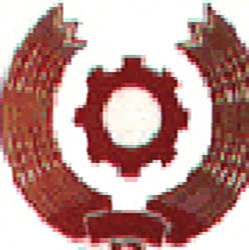
- Flag Seal

- Location within Egypt
- Coordinates: 31°02′26″N 30°28′12″E
- Country: Egypt
- Governorate: Beheira

Area
  - Total: 6.840 km^{2} (2.641 sq mi)
- Elevation: 9 m (30 ft)

Population (2023)
  - Total: 329,572
  - Density: 48,180/km^{2} (124,800/sq mi)
- Time zone: UTC+2 (EET)
  - Summer (DST): UTC+3 (EEST)
- Area code: (+20) 45

Damanhur (Egyptian Arabic: دمنهور Damanhūr, IPA: [dɑmɑnˈhuːɾ]) is a city in Lower Egypt, and the capital of the Beheira Governorate. It is located 160 km (99 mi) northwest of Cairo, and 70 km (43 mi) ESE of Alexandria, in the middle of the western Nile Delta. Damanhur is a historic city, whose history can be dated back to the Old Kingdom of Egypt. The modern city has also absorbed the ancient villages Shubra al-Jadida (Egyptian Arabic: شبرا الجديدة, Coptic: ϫⲉⲃⲣⲟ ⲙⲃⲉⲣⲓ), Tāmus (Egyptian Arabic: طاموس‌), Askanida (Egyptian Arabic: اسكنيدة) and Chortaso (Egyptian Arabic: قرطسا, Ancient Greek: Χορτασω).

== Etymology ==
D46 W19 M17 M17 O49 W24 G5 Z1orD46 Aa15 W19 M17 M17 X1 O49 S3 G6 X1 O49
Țemāi en Ḥeru
in hieroglyphs

The city's modern Arabic name comes from Coptic p-Timinhor (Coptic: ⲡϯⲙⲓⲛ̀ϩⲱⲣ, Coptic pronunciation: [ptəmənhoːr]), which in turn is derived from Ancient Egyptian: pꜣ-dmỉ-n-Ḥr.w, lit. 'the settlement of Horus', also attested in Aramaic (Imperial Aramaic: תמנחור, romanized: Temenkhūr).

The Greeks called the city Hermopolis Mikra (Ancient Greek: Ἑρμοῦ πόλις μικρά).

The name of the city suggests that Horus, whom Greeks equated with Apollo, was worshipped as the chief deity. However, the Greek name for the town, Hermopolis Mikra, suggests that Hermes/Thoth was the local god. This discrepancy is possibly due to a misinterpretation that persisted even after the Greeks had gained a better understanding of Egypt.

== History ==
In ancient Egypt, the city was the capital of Lower Egypt's 7th Nome of A-ment. It stood on the banks of a canal known as the Butic Canal, which connected the lake Mareotis with the Canopic or most westerly arm of the Nile. Damanhur was at the westernmost end of the canal.

The ancient city of Metelis, the capital of the old Metelite nome, was also located in this area. The exact location of Metelis was debated for a long time. Some older sources located Metelis at Fuwwah or some other town nearby, but recent research indicates that it was at Metelis (Kom el-Ahmer).

The city attracted the notice of numerous ancient geographers, including Stephanus of Byzantium s. v., Strabo (xvii. p. 802), Ptolemy (iv. 5. § 46), and the author of the Antonine Itinerary (p. 154). Damanhur is a Roman Catholic titular see.

It was first made a provincial capital under Fatimid rule in 11th century, and in the Middle Ages it prospered as a caravan town on the post road from Cairo to Alexandria. It was severely damaged in 1302 by an earthquake, but in the late 14th century the Mamluk sultan Barquq restored its fortifications to protect the city from Bedouins.

In 1799, the city revolted against the French, who cruelly crushed the rebels, killing 1,500.

In 1986, the population of Damanhur was 188,939. The richly cultivated Beheira province gives rise to mainly agricultural industries which include cotton ginning, potato processing, and date picking. It also has a market for cotton and rice.

On the 10th of February 2023, six people, including three boys, were killed and at least 20 injured when an apartment building collapsed.

== Notable people ==
- Cyril VI
- Ahmed H. Zewail

== Climate ==
Being located close to the Nile Delta and the northern coast of Egypt, that give Damanhur a hot desert climate (Köppen: BWh), moderated by blowing winds coming from the Mediterranean Sea, typical to the coast. The city gets average precipitation during winter, and rare rain during other seasons. Hail and frost are not unknown specifically during winter.

Climate data for Damanhur
Month	Jan	Feb	Mar	Apr	May	Jun	Jul	Aug	Sep	Oct	Nov	Dec	Year
Mean daily maximum °C (°F)	20.0 (68.0)	20.0 (68.0)	22.8 (73.0)	27.2 (81.0)	30.0 (86.0)	32.2 (90.0)	32.8 (91.0)	32.8 (91.0)	31.1 (88.0)	30.0 (86.0)	26.1 (79.0)	21.1 (70.0)	27.2 (80.9)
Daily mean °C (°F)	13.9 (57.0)	13.9 (57.0)	17.2 (63.0)	18.9 (66.0)	22.8 (73.0)	25.0 (77.0)	26.1 (79.0)	27.2 (81.0)	25.0 (77.0)	22.8 (73.0)	20.0 (68.0)	16.1 (61.0)	20.7 (69.3)
Mean daily minimum °C (°F)	7.5 (45.5)	7.9 (46.2)	9.6 (49.3)	12.1 (53.8)	15.5 (59.9)	18.2 (64.8)	20.0 (68.0)	20.4 (68.7)	18.9 (66.0)	17.0 (62.6)	13.9 (57.0)	9.6 (49.3)	14.2 (57.6)
Average rainfall mm (inches)	25 (1.0)	21 (0.8)	9 (0.4)	2 (0.1)	2 (0.1)	0 (0)	0 (0)	0 (0)	0 (0)	5 (0.2)	9 (0.4)	23 (0.9)	96 (3.9)
Average relative humidity (%)	81	78	76	67	62	63	67	71	75	77	79	80	73
Source: Arab Meteorology Book
