= Seyoum Tesfaye =

Ethiopian footballer (born 1989)

Personal information
- Date of birth: 19 December 1989 (age 36)
- Place of birth: Bishoftu, Oromia, Ethiopia
- Height: 1.76 m (5 ft 9 in)
- Position: Defender

Team information
- Current team: Ethiopian Coffee
- Number: 17

Senior career*
Years	Team	Apps	(Gls)
2013–	Dedebit		

International career^{‡}
2007–2017	Ethiopia	41	(4)
- * Club domestic league appearances and goals ‡ National team caps and goals as of 4 April 2017

Seyoum Tesfaye is an Ethiopian professional footballer who plays as a defender for Ethiopian Premier League club Ethiopian Coffee.

== International career ==
In January 2014, coach Sewnet Bishaw, invited him to be a part of the Ethiopia squad for the 2014 African Nations Championship. The team was eliminated in the group stages after losing to Congo, Libya and Ghana.

=== International goals ===
Scores and results list Ethiopia's goal tally first.

No	Date	Venue	Opponent	Score	Result	Competition
1.	8 September 2012	Al-Merrikh Stadium, Omdurman, Sudan	Sudan	3–3	3–5	2013 Africa Cup of Nations qualification
2.	5 September 2015	Stade Linité, Victoria, Seychelles	Seychelles	1–1	1–1	2017 Africa Cup of Nations qualification
3.	25 October 2015	Addis Ababa Stadium, Addis Ababa, Ethiopia	Burundi	1–0	3–0	2016 African Nations Championship qualification
4.	25 January 2016	Amahoro Stadium, Kigali, Rwanda	Angola	2–2	1–2	2016 African Nations Championship
