= Akbar Kargarjam =

Iranian footballer (1944–2025)

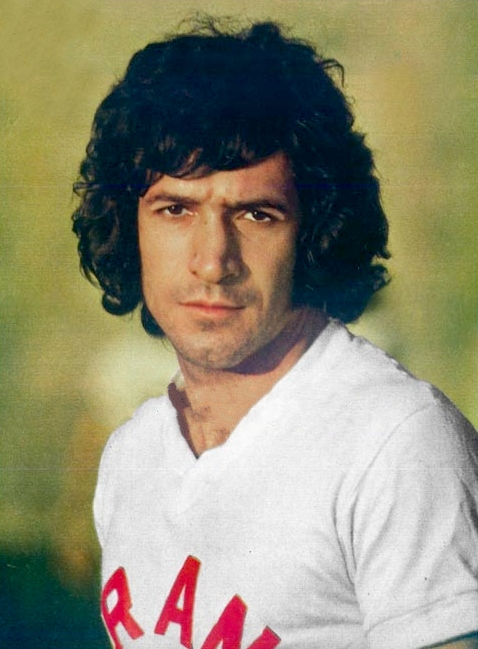

Personal information
- Date of birth: 26 December 1944
- Place of birth: Tehran, Iran
- Date of death: 26 October 2025 (aged 80)
- Place of death: Tehran, Iran
- Height: 1.76 m (5 ft 9 in)
- Position: Defender

Youth career
- Taj SC

Senior career*
Years	Team	Apps	(Gls)
1967–1969	Rah Ahan		
1969–1976	Taj SC		

International career
1971–1974	Iran	30	(1)
Medal record
Representing Iran
AFC Asian Cup
Winner	1972
- * Club domestic league appearances and goals

Akbar Kargarjam (Persian: اکبر کارگرجم; 26 December 1944 – 26 October 2025) was an Iranian association football defender who played for the Iran national team at the 1972 Summer Olympics. He also played for Rah Ahan and Taj SC.

Kargarjam died from cancer at the Jam Hospital in Tehran, on 26 October 2025, at the age of 80.

== Honours ==
Taj

- Iran Football League: 1970, 1975
- Tehran Football League: 1972
- AFC Champions League: 1970

Iran

- AFC Asian Cup: 1972

Individuals

- Iran Footballer of the Year: 1973
