= Mama Ouattara =

Ivorian footballer (1951–2004)

Mama Ouattara (22 June 1951 – 12 June 2004) was an Ivorian professional footballer who played as a defender for Stade d'Abidjan and for French clubs Nïmes, Montpellier, and Olympique Avignonnais. He also represented the Ivory Coast national team at international level.

== Career ==
Ouattara played for Montpellier from 1974 to 1983.

Following his playing career he pursued a career in coaching, being assigned a job in the Ivory Coast national team in 2002. He took the Ivorian junior team to second place at the 2003 African Youth Championship in Burkina Faso and subsequently led the team to the World Youth Championship in the United Arab Emirates. He became the right-hand man to former national team coach Henri Michel.

He died of a suspected heart attack at the age of 52, following a training session before the Ivory Coast v Egypt World Cup qualifying game.
