= Clifford Odame =

Ghanaian footballer

Personal information
- Date of birth: 1946 (age 79–80)
- Position: Defender

International career
Years	Team	Apps	(Gls)
- Ghana

Clifford Odame (born 1946) is a Ghanaian former footballer. He competed in the men's tournament at the 1972 Summer Olympics.
