= Armah Akuetteh =

Ghanaian footballer

Personal information
- Date of birth: 27 January 1946 (age 80)
- Position: Defender

International career
Years	Team	Apps	(Gls)
- Ghana

Armah Akuetteh (born 27 January 1946) is a Ghanaian footballer. He competed in the men's tournament at the 1972 Summer Olympics.
