= Rabah Gamouh =

Algerian footballer (born 1952)

Personal information
- Date of birth: 21 January 1952 (age 74)
- Place of birth: Annaba, Algeria
- Height: 1.68 m (5 ft 6 in)
- Positions: Midfielder; forward

Youth career
- 1966–1970: Red Star Annaba

Senior career*
Years	Team	Apps	(Gls)
1970–1977	MO Constantine		
1977–1982	Nîmes	122	(17)
1982–1983	Grenoble	32	(9)
1983–1984	Guingamp	20	(6)
1984–1985	La Roche VF		
1985–1986	ESGC Uzès		
1986–1988	UA Cognac		

International career
1969	Algeria U17		
1970–1971	Algeria U20		
1971–1982	Algeria		
- * Club domestic league appearances and goals

Rabah Gamouh (born 21 October 1952) is an Algerian former professional footballer who played as a midfielder and forward.

== International career ==
Gamouh was a member of the Algeria national team that qualified for the 1982 FIFA World Cup, playing in the decisive final qualifiers against Nigeria. However, he was not selected in the squad for the final tournament.

== Honours ==
- Algerian Championnat National top scorer: 1970–71 (25 goals), 1971–72 (24 goals)
