= Abukari Gariba =

Ghanaian footballer (1939–2021)

Personal information
- Date of birth: 13 June 1939
- Place of birth: Yamale, Ghana
- Date of death: 23 January 2021 (aged 81)
- Place of death: Kumasi, Ghana
- Position: Forward

Senior career*
Years	Team	Apps	(Gls)
1962–1974	Asante Kotoko		(53)

International career
1968–1972	Ghana	4	(0)
- * Club domestic league appearances and goals

Abukari Gariba (13 June 1939 – 23 January 2021) was a Ghanaian footballer born in Yamale. He competed at the 1968 Summer Olympics and the 1972 Summer Olympics. He died at the age of 81 in Kumasi on 23 January 2021.
