= Adam Mohamed Izz El-Din =

Sudanese footballer

Personal information
- Date of birth: 1949 (age 76–77)

International career
Years	Team	Apps	(Gls)
- Sudan

Adam Mohamed Izz El-Din (born 1949) is a Sudanese footballer. He competed in the men's tournament at the 1972 Summer Olympics.
