= Bobby Hogg (soccer, born 1947) =

Australian soccer player

Personal information
- Date of birth: 4 April 1947 (age 79)
- Positions: Midfielder; defender

Youth career
- Sauchie

Senior career*
| Years | Team | Apps | (Gls) |
| 1964–1967 | Hibernian | 1 | (0) |
| 1967–1969 | Motherwell | 5 | (2) |
| 1969–1971 | Stenhousemuir | 55 | (1) |
- St. George-Budapest
- Auburn

International career
| 1972–1973 | Australia | 13 | (0) |
- * Club domestic league appearances and goals

Bobby Hogg (born 4 April 1947) is a former soccer player who represented Australia during the 1970s.

== Playing career ==
=== Club career ===
After short stints at Hibernian and Motherwell he joined Stenhousemuir.

After 55 matches with Stenhousemuir, Hogg played club football for St. George-Budapest and Auburn in the New South Wales State League.

=== International career ===
In 1972 and 1973 Hogg made a total of 17 appearances for Australia, including 13 full international matches.
