= Joseph Ghartey =

Ghanaian footballer

Personal information
- Date of birth: 27 June 1943 (age 83)
- Position: Midfielder

International career
Years	Team	Apps	(Gls)
- Ghana

Joseph Ghartey (born 27 June 1943) is a Ghanaian footballer. He competed in the men's tournament at the 1972 Summer Olympics.
