= Sunday Oyarekhua =

Nigerian footballer and policeman

Sunday ("Sunny") Oyarekhua (died 2021) was a Nigerian international football forward.

== Football career ==
A career policeman, Oyarekhua was discovered by the national team's coaches while playing for the Police F.C. of Lagos.

Oyarekhua scored 13 times in 30 appearances for Nigeria between 1971 and 1976. He scored on his debut, a friendly match against the Upper Volta in 1971. He was the leading scorer on Nigeria's 1973 All-Africa Games winning squad. Oyarekhua also played for Nigeria at the 1976 African Cup of Nations finals in Ethiopia.

He retired as the Assistant Commissioner of the Osun State Police.
