= 2009–10 Malian Première Division =

Malian Première Division
- Season: 2009–10
- Champions: Stade Malien (Bamako)
- Relegated: AS Sigui; Stade Malien (Sikasso)
- 2011 CAF Champions League: Stade Malien (Bamako); Djoliba AC
- 2011 CAF Confederation Cup: Centre Salif Keita; AS Real Bamako (cup winner)

The 2009–10 Malian Première Division is the 45th season and current championship of the Highest-Level of Professional Soccer in Mali.

== Overview ==
Though the competition's structure has varied over time, the size of the league remained the same from the previous season. The championship is once again contested by 14 teams between December 2009 and September 2010. The league will be conducted over 26 rounds as well with all teams playing against each other twice on a home and away basis. The defending champions are Djoliba AC who won their second consecutive and 21st overall league championship.

The structure by which promoted clubs are chosen has changed over time, but as of 2008, the two promoted teams are chosen from regional league tournaments. One club comes from Malian Groupe B league soccer tournament (for teams near Bamako and the west) and the other is the Malian Groupe A league which is a tournament for clubs outside Bamako. AS Sigui were promoted from Group A and AS Police were promoted from Group B.

== Malian Premiere Division Club Information ==
Club	Status	Founded	Stadium
Djoliba AC (Bamako)	2008–09 Première Division Champions CAF Champions League Participant	1960	Complex Sportif Hérémakono
Cercle Olympique	CAF Confederation Cup Participant	1960	Stade du 26 Mars
Stade Malien (Bamako)	3rd in 2008–09	1960	Stade du 26 Mars
USFAS Bamako	4th in 2008–09	1965	Stade Municipal de USFAS
AS Real Bamako	5th in 2008–09	1978	Stade Modibo Keïta
Centre Salif Keita (Bamako)	6th in 2008–09	1995	Stade Centre Salif Keita
AS Korofina (Bamako)	7th in 2008–09	1977	Stade Centre Salif Keita
CS Duguwolofila (Koulikoro)	8th in 2008–09		
Stade Malien (Sikasso)	9th in 2008–09		Stade Omnisports
Jeanne D'Arc	10th in 2008–09	2007	
AS Bakaridjan de Barouéli (Ségou)	11th in 2008–09	1989	Stade de Barouéli
Onze Créateurs de Niaréla (Bamako)	12th in 2008–09		
AS Police	Promoted from Malian Groupe B league		
AS Sigui	Promoted from Malian Groupe A league		

== Table ==
Pos	Team	Pld	W	D	L	GF	GA	GD	Pts	Qualification or relegation
1	Stade Malien (Bamako) (C)	26	20	2	4	48	17	+31	62	Qualification for 2011 CAF Champions League
2	Djoliba AC	26	17	8	1	34	9	+25	59	Qualification for 2011 CAF Champions League
3	Centre Salif Keita	26	14	5	7	31	21	+10	47	Qualification for 2011 CAF Confederation Cup
4	Cercle Olympique	26	12	4	10	33	29	+4	40	
5	Jeanne D'Arc	26	11	5	10	32	29	+3	38	
6	AS Real Bamako	26	8	12	6	28	23	+5	36	Qualification for 2011 CAF Confederation Cup
7	AS Police	26	8	9	9	23	34	−11	33	
8	AS Korofina	26	8	7	11	24	26	−2	31	
9	Onze Créateurs de Niaréla	26	8	4	14	31	40	−9	28	
10	CS Duguwolofila	26	7	8	11	20	30	−10	29	
11	USFAS Bamako	26	6	9	11	21	31	−10	27	
12	AS Bakaridjan de Barouéli	26	6	8	12	25	31	−6	26	
13	AS Sigui (R)	26	5	7	14	19	45	−26	22	Relegation to Malian Regional Leagues
14	Stade Malien (Sikasso) (R)	26	5	6	15	21	45	−24	21	Relegation to Malian Regional Leagues

Updated to match(es) played on 29 August 2010. Source: FIFA.com
Rules for classification: 1) points; 2) goal difference; 3) number of goals scored.
(C) Champions; (R) Relegated
