= 2008–09 Malian Première Division =

Malien Première Division
- Season: 2008–09
- Champions: Djoliba AC
- Relegated: AS Bamako; Al-Farouk
- Champions League: Djoliba AC
- Confederation Cup: CO Bamako

The 2008–09 Malian Première Division was the 44th season of the Highest-Level of Professional Soccer in Mali.

== Overview ==
Though the competition's structure has varied over time, the size of the league remained the same from the previous season. The championship was once again contested by fourteen teams between December 2008 and September 2009. The league was conducted over 26 rounds as well with all teams playing against each other twice on a home and away basis.

The structure by which promoted clubs are chosen has changed over time, but as of 2008, the two promoted teams are chosen from regional league tournaments. One club comes from Malian Groupe B league soccer tournament (for teams near Bamako and the west) and the other is the Malian Groupe A league which is a tournament for clubs outside Bamako. Al Farouk were promoted from Group A and Jeanne d'Arc FC were promoted from Group B.

The season featured 183 matches, a total of 421 goals were scored, more than last season

Djoliba AC qualified into the 2010 CAF Champions League while CO Bamako qualified into the 2010 CAF Confederation Cup.

== Club information ==
| Club (with 2007/08 final standing) | Status at beginning of season | Stadium |
|---|---|---|
| 1. Djoliba AC (Bamako) | 2007–08 Champions | Complex Sportif Hérémakono |
| 2. Stade Malien (Bamako) | | Stade du 26 Mars |
| 3. AS Bakaridjan de Barouéli (Ségou) | | Stade de Barouéli |
| 4. Cercle Olympique de Bamako | | Stade du 26 Mars |
| 5. AS Real Bamako | | Stade Modibo Keïta |
| 6. Centre Salif Keita (Bamako) | | Stade Centre Salif Keita |
| 7. AS Bamako (Bamako) | | Stade Municipal de Bamako |
| 8. AS Korofina (Bamako) | | Stade Centre Salif Keita |
| 9. CS Duguwolofila(Koulikoro) | | |
| 10. Onze Créateurs de Niaréla (Bamako) | | |
| 11. USFAS Bamako | | Stade Municipal de USFAS |
| 12. Stade Malien de Sikasso | | Stade Omnisports |
| P. Jeanne d'Arc FC Bamako | Promoted from League B | |
| P. Al Farouk de Tombouctou | Promoted from League A. | |

== League table ==
| Pos | Team | Pld | W | D | L | GF | GA | GD | Pts | Qualification or relegation |
|---|---|---|---|---|---|---|---|---|---|---|
| 1 | Djoliba AC (C, P) | 26 | 16 | 7 | 3 | 43 | 15 | +28 | 55 | Qualification to CAF Champions League |
| 2 | CO Bamako (P) | 26 | 14 | 7 | 5 | 37 | 20 | +17 | 49 | Qualification to both CAF Champions League and the Confederations Cup |
| 3 | Stade Malien | 26 | 14 | 6 | 6 | 35 | 17 | +18 | 48 | Qualification to CAF Confederations Cup |
| 4 | USFAS Bamako | 26 | 10 | 10 | 6 | 33 | 26 | +7 | 40 | |
| 5 | AS Réal | 26 | 10 | 10 | 6 | 31 | 27 | +4 | 40 | |
| 6 | CSK Bamako | 26 | 10 | 8 | 8 | 34 | 26 | +8 | 38 | |
| 7 | AS Korofina | 26 | 9 | 8 | 9 | 32 | 23 | +9 | 35 | |
| 8 | CS Duguwolofila | 26 | 7 | 12 | 7 | 32 | 28 | +4 | 33 | |
| 9 | SM Sikasso | 26 | 9 | 6 | 11 | 25 | 30 | −5 | 33 | |
| 10 | Jeanne d'Arc FC | 26 | 9 | 5 | 12 | 27 | 30 | −3 | 32 | |
| 11 | AS Bakaridjan | 26 | 6 | 11 | 9 | 26 | 30 | −4 | 29 | |
| 12 | Onze Créateurs | 26 | 7 | 6 | 13 | 27 | 41 | −14 | 27 | |
| 13 | AS Bamako (R) | 26 | 5 | 10 | 11 | 28 | 38 | −10 | 25 | Relegation to Malian Regional Leagues |
| 14 | Al-Farouk (R) | 26 | 1 | 4 | 21 | 11 | 70 | −59 | 7 | Relegation to Malian Regional Leagues |

(C) Champions; (P) Promoted; (R) Relegated

== Topscorers ==
| Rank | Player | Team | Goals |
|---|---|---|---|
| 1 | (Mali) Ousmane Ben Goïta | | |
| 2 | (Mali) Mamadou Coulibaly | | 13 |
