= 2010–11 Malian Première Division =

Malian Première Division
- Season: 2010–11
- Champions: Stade Malien
- Relegated: USFAS Bamako; CAS de Sévaré
- 2012 CAF Champions League: Stade Malien; Djoliba AC
- 2012 CAF Confederation Cup: AS Real Bamako; Cercle Olympique de Bamako (cup winner)

The 2010–11 Malian Première Division is the 46th season of the highest level of professional football in Mali. The championship is once again contested by 14 teams between December 2010 and September 2011. The defending champions are Stade Malien (Bamako).

== Teams ==
AS Sigui and Stade Malien de Sikasso were relegated at the end of last season after finishing in the bottom two places of the table. The relegated teams were replaced by the champions of the two Malian second-level league groups, AS Bamako and CAS de Sévaré.

Club	Location	Stadium	2009–10 pos
AS Bakaridjan de Barouéli	Ségou	Stade de Barouéli	12th
AS Bamako	Bamako	Stade Municipal de Bamako	D2 B 1st
CAS de Sévaré	Sévaré		D2 A 1st
Centre Salif Keita	Bamako	Stade Centre Salif Keita	3rd
Cercle Olympique	Bamako	Stade du 26 Mars	4th
Djoliba AC	Bamako	Complex Sportif Hérémakono	2nd
CS Duguwolofila	Koulikoro		10th
Jeanne d'Arc	Bamako		5th
AS Korofina	Bamako	Stade Modibo Keïta	8th
Onze Créateurs de Niaréla	Bamako		9th
AS Police	Bamako		7th
AS Real Bamako	Bamako	Stade Modibo Keïta	6th
Stade Malien	Bamako	Stade du 26 Mars	1st
USFAS Bamako	Bamako	Stade Municipal de USFAS	11th

== League table ==
Pos	Team	Pld	W	D	L	GF	GA	GD	Pts	Qualification or relegation
1	Stade Malien	26	18	5	3	46	12	+34	59	Qualification for both 2012 CAF Champions League and 2012 CAF Confederation Cup
2	Djoliba AC	26	14	7	5	37	19	+18	49	Qualification for both 2012 CAF Champions League and 2012 CAF Confederation Cup
3	AS Real Bamako	26	12	9	5	35	20	+15	45	Qualification for 2012 CAF Confederation Cup
4	AS Korofina	26	11	8	7	24	21	+3	41	
5	Cercle Olympique	26	9	11	6	29	23	+6	38	Qualification for 2012 CAF Confederation Cup
6	Jeanne d'Arc	26	10	6	10	32	32	0	36	
7	CS Duguwolofila	26	8	12	6	31	31	0	36	
8	Onze Créateurs de Niaréla	26	9	5	12	40	39	+1	32	
9	AS Bakaridjan de Barouéli	26	8	7	11	28	35	−7	31	
10	Centre Salif Keita	26	9	4	13	29	40	−11	31	
11	AS Bamako	26	8	7	11	27	38	−11	31	
12	AS Police	26	8	6	12	34	35	−1	30	
13	USFAS Bamako	26	6	8	12	34	44	−10	26	Relegation to Malian Regional Leagues
14	CAS de Sévaré	26	2	5	19	13	50	−37	11	Relegation to Malian Regional Leagues

Updated to match(es) played on 17 July 2011. Source: FIFA.com, Soccerway.com
Rules for classification: 1) points; 2) goal difference; 3) number of goals scored.
