= 2020–21 Malian Première Division =

Malian Première Division
- Season: 2020–21
- Dates: 20 February – 19 July 2021
- Champions: Stade Malien
- Matches: 192
- Goals: 414 (2.16 per match)
- Highest scoring: LC Bamako 6-1 US Bougouni (27th March 2021)
- All statistics correct as of 18 July 2021.

The 2020–21 Malian Première Division is the 54th season of the highest level of professional football in Mali. The championship was contested by 20 teams, starting in February 2021 and finishing in July 2021. Stade Malien were the holders going into the season following their 22nd title in the 2019-20 season, and successfully defended their title by winning the Carré d'As.

== Overview ==
Following the expansion from 18 teams in 2017 to 23 in 2019-20, the league was reduced to 20 teams for the 2020–21 season. This involved 6 teams being relegated from the Première Division (AS Performance, AS Sabana, AS Avenir, AS Bamako, JS Centre Salif Keita, and Mamahira AC) and only 3 teams being promoted from the second tier (CAS Sévaré, AS Douanes and AS Korofina). Like the previous season, the league was divided into two round-robin pools. The top two teams in each pool qualify for the Championship Play-Off (Carré d'As in French), a further round-robin to determine the league champion, while the bottom two in each pool get relegated.

== Main Stage ==
=== Pool A ===
Pos	Team	Pld	W	D	L	GF	GA	GD	Pts	Qualification or relegation
1	Stade Malien (Q)	18	9	8	1	28	12	+16	35	Advance to Championship Play-off
2	AS Real Bamako (Q)	18	9	5	4	27	12	+15	32	Advance to Championship Play-off
3	CS Duguwolofila	18	6	8	4	21	17	+4	26	
4	Lafia Club de Bamako	18	6	7	5	29	21	+8	25 (Note: Head-to-head record: LC Bamako 4-2 USC Kita, USC Kita 1-0 LC Bamako;)	
5	USC Kita	18	6	7	5	16	15	+1	25	
6	AS Douanes de Sikasso	18	6	6	6	16	19	−3	24	
7	AS Olympique de Messira	18	6	5	7	19	23	−4	23	
8	AS Police de Bamako	18	4	8	6	19	23	−4	20	
9	US Bougouni (R)	18	5	4	9	14	27	−13	19	Relegation
10	CAS de Sévaré (R)	18	0	8	10	14	34	−20	8	Relegation

Updated to match(es) played on 18 July 2021. Source: Soccerway
Rules for classification: 1) Points; 2) Head-to-head points 3) Goal Difference
(Q) Qualified for the phase indicated; (R) Relegated

=== Pool B ===
Pos	Team	Pld	W	D	L	GF	GA	GD	Pts	Qualification or relegation
1	Djoliba AC (Q)	18	10	7	1	29	7	+22	37	Advance to Championship Play-off
2	Onze Créateurs de Niaréla (Q)	18	10	3	5	32	13	+19	33	Advance to Championship Play-off
3	AS Korofina	18	9	5	4	18	9	+9	32	
4	Yeelen Olympique	18	9	4	5	25	17	+8	31	
5	AS Bakaridjan	18	7	5	6	14	14	0	26	
6	AS Black Stars de Badalabougou	18	5	7	6	20	21	−1	22 (Note: Head-to-head record: Black Stars 2-1 CO Bamako, CO Bamako 1-1 Black Stars;)	
7	Cercle Olympique de Bamako	18	6	4	8	19	21	−2	22	
8	USFAS Bamako	18	4	5	9	12	24	−12	17	
9	AS Nianan (R)	18	2	7	9	11	28	−17	13	Relegation
10	Sonni AC (R)	18	2	5	11	11	37	−26	11	Relegation

Updated to match(es) played on 18 July 2021. Source: Soccerway
Rules for classification: 1) Points; 2) Head-to-head points 3) Goal Difference
(Q) Qualified for the phase indicated; (R) Relegated

== Play-Offs ==
=== Championship play-off ===
Pos	Team	Pld	W	D	L	GF	GA	GD	Pts	Qualification
1	Stade Malien (C)	6	3	3	0	8	2	+6	12	Qualification for 2021–22 CAF Champions League
2	Onze Créateurs de Niaréla	6	2	2	2	7	7	0	8	
3	Djoliba AC	6	1	3	2	3	4	−1	6	
4	AS Real Bamako	6	1	2	3	2	7	−5	5	

Updated to match(es) played on 18 July 2021. Source: Soccerway
(C) Champions

Stadiums:

Team	Location	Stadium	Capacity
Stade Malien	Bamako	Stade du 26 Mars	50,000
AS Onze Créateurs de Niaréla	Bamako	Stade du 26 Mars	50,000
Djoliba AC	Bamako	Stade du 26 Mars	50,000
AS Real Bamako	Bamako	Stade Modibo Kéïta	35,000
