= 2021–22 Malian Première Division =

Malian Première Division
- Season: 2021–22
- Dates: 13 November 2021 – 14 July 2022
- Champions: Djoliba AC (23rd title)
- Relegated: CS Duguwolofila; US Bougouba; AS Olympique de Messira; AS Douanes de Sikasso
- CAF Champions League: Djoliba AC
- CAF Confederation Cup: AS Real Bamako
- Top goalscorer: Moussa Koné (20 goals)
- All statistics correct as of 17 August 2022.

The 2021–22 Malian Première Division was the 55th season of the highest level of professional football in Mali. The championship was contested by 18 teams, starting in November 2021 and finishing in July 2022. Stade Malien were the holders going into the season following their 23nd title in the 2020-21 season, but lost the title to Djoliba AC, who won their 23rd title and drew level with Stade Malien in overall championships won.

== Overview ==
Unlike the 2020-21 season, which had two pools of 10 teams and a championship stage, the league went back to an 18 team home-and-away schedule for the 2021–22 season. The reduction from 20 clubs to 18 clubs meant that only two clubs (Afrique Football Elite and US Bougouba) were promoted from the second-tier to replace the four relegated teams from 2020 to 2021.

AS Bakaridjan, Djoliba AC, and USC Kita all mounted strong title challenges and remained towards the top of the table throughout the season, but Djoliba AC eventually accumulated an eight-point lead and won the title with two games left. Djoliba AC also beat AS Real Bamako in the Malian Cup final to complete the league-cup double. Despite finishing 5th, AS Real Bamako qualified for the 2022-23 CAF Confederation Cup by finishing runners-up in the cup. CS Duguwolofila, US Bougouba, AS Olympique de Messira and AS Douanes de Sikasso were relegated to the second-tier after finishing in the bottom four. They will be replaced by Binga FC and US Bougouni, who both won their respective Tournoi de Montée pools.

== League table ==
Pos	Team	Pld	W	D	L	GF	GA	GD	Pts	Qualification or relegation
1	Djoliba AC (C, Q)	34	17	11	6	44	20	+24	62	Qualification for 2022–23 CAF Champions League
2	AS Bakaridjan	34	14	12	8	39	29	+10	54	
3	USC Kita	34	12	18	4	34	28	+6	54	
4	Stade Malien	34	15	8	11	38	25	+13	53	
5	AS Real Bamako	34	11	15	8	25	16	+9	48	Qualification for the 2022–23 CAF Confederation Cup (Note: AS Real Bamako qualified for the CAF Confederation Cup as the 2021-22 Malian Cup runners-up)
6	AS Korofina	34	12	12	10	32	28	+4	48	
7	Afrique Football Élite	34	11	15	8	29	27	+2	48	
8	Onze Créateurs de Niaréla	34	10	16	8	32	23	+9	46	
9	Cercle Olympique de Bamako	34	11	13	10	27	25	+2	46	
10	USFAS Bamako	34	11	13	10	26	30	−4	46	
11	AS Police de Bamako	34	10	15	9	29	30	−1	45	
12	Yeelen Olympique	34	10	14	10	31	29	+2	44	
13	Lafia Club de Bamako	34	11	11	12	33	35	−2	44	
14	AS Black Stars de Badalabougou	34	12	8	14	24	29	−5	44	
15	CS Duguwolofila (R)	34	10	12	12	33	39	−6	42	Relegation
16	US Bougouba (R)	34	10	7	17	38	46	−8	37	Relegation
17	AS Olympique de Messira (R)	34	3	14	17	17	44	−27	23	Relegation
18	AS Douanes de Sikasso (R)	34	3	12	19	16	44	−28	21	Relegation

Updated to match(es) played on 17 August 2022. Source: Soccerway
Rules for classification: 1) Points; 2) Goal Difference
(C) Champions; (Q) Qualified for the phase indicated; (R) Relegated
