= 2007–08 Malian Première Division =

Malian Première Division
- Season: 2007–08
- Champions: Djoliba AC (20th title)
- Relegated: Débo Club de Mopti; AS Nianan
- Matches played: 183
- Goals scored: 373 (2.04 per match)

The 2007–08 Malian Première Division was the 43rd season of Malian top flight football. It took place over 26 rounds between 15 December 2007 and 1 September 2008, with fourteen clubs. The champion qualified for the 2009 CAF Champions League and the bottom two clubs were relegated to the lower division. Stade Malien started the season as the holders for the third time in a row, however Djoliba AC won their 20th title and qualified for the 2009 CAF Champions League. At the time in the number of titles, Djoliba had 20 titles and formed one of the most of any amateur championships in the world, overall it may be around the top ten range of any clubs who had 20+ championship titles in the world at the time.

The season featured 183 matches, a total of 373 goals were scored.

== League table ==
Pos	Team	Pld	W	D	L	GF	GA	GD	Pts	Qualification or relegation
1	Djoliba AC (Bamako)	26	20	3	3	44	13	+31	63	Champions
2	Stade Malien (Bamako)	26	17	4	5	37	9	+28	55	
3	AS Bakaridjan de Barouéli (Ségou)	26	12	6	8	33	24	+9	42	
4	Cercle Olympique de Bamako	26	12	6	8	33	27	+6	42	
5	AS Real Bamako	26	12	5	9	36	32	+4	41	
6	Centre Salif Keita (Bamako)	26	9	9	8	24	22	+2	36	
7	AS Bamako (Bamako)	26	9	8	9	23	20	+3	35	
8	AS Korofina (Bamako)	26	10	5	11	26	26	0	35	
9	CS Duguwolofila (Koulikoro)	26	9	6	11	23	29	−6	33	
10	Onze Créateurs de Niaréla (Bamako)	26	8	7	11	19	32	−13	31	
11	USFAS Bamako	26	6	8	12	22	34	−12	26	
12	Stade Malien de Sikasso	26	4	10	12	16	30	−14	22	
13	Débo Club de Mopti	26	4	9	13	17	31	−14	21	Relegated
14	AS Nianan (Koulikoro)	26	4	6	16	20	44	−24	18	Relegated

Source: RSSSF

== Champions ==
Club	City	Title
Djoliba AC	Bamako	Malien Cup 2008
Djoliba AC	Bamako	League 2008
