= 2019–20 Malian Première Division =

Malian Première Division
- Season: 2019–20
- Champions: Stade Malien (22nd title)
- Relegated: AS Performance; AS Sabana; AS Bamako; AS Avenir; Mamahira AC; Centre Salif Keita
- CAF Champions League: Stade Malien
- CAF Confederation Cup: Yeelen Olympique

The 2019–20 Malian Première Division was the 53rd season of the highest level of professional football in Mali, and the first complete season since the 2016 season. The championship was contested by 23 teams between August 2019 and September 2020. The championship was interrupted after 21 matchdays in March 2020 by the COVID-19 pandemic, and resumed in August 2020 with the 22nd and final matchday, along with the championship and relegation play-offs. Stade Malien won their 22nd title and equalled Djoliba AC's record.

== Overview ==
The league was expanded from the abandoned 2017 season, with the bottom four teams (JS Centre Salif Keita, CS Duguwolofila, AS Nianan and Sonni AC) getting a reprieve, two teams being promoted from the 2017-18 Tournoi de Montée (Yeelen Olympique and AS Performance) and three of the four teams relegated in 2016 season (AS Police, AS Avenir, and AS Sabana), leading to an increase from 18 teams to 23 teams. The league was divided into two pools to accommodate this increase, and within each pool every team played each other home and away. The top two in each pool qualified for the Championship Play-Off, while the bottom four were put into the Relegation Play-off.

Djoliba AC and Stade Malien took their respective pools by storm, with each team having a draw and no losses at the halfway point of the main stage. Stade Malien remained unbeaten for the remainder of this phase and only dropped six points in their twenty games, finishing 15 points clear of second-placed Yeelen Olympique and 18 ahead of Onze Créateurs in third. Yeelen Olympique defied the odds by qualifying for the Championship play-off in their first-ever season in the Malian top flight. In the other pool, 20-time champions Djoliba AC and 6-time champions AS Real Bamako finished the main phase in the top two and qualified for the play-off.

After a 5-month break due to the COVID-19 situation, several teams refused to participate on the final match day and any postseason competition. Moussa Konaté, president of Cercle Olympique de Bamako was reported to say "We objectively believe that Femafoot does not have the means to enforce the sanitary measures decreed by the Scientific Committee (...) Besides, this championship is marred by irregularities due to the lack of independent commissions. Playing the championship without these commissions, it's like playing a match without the referee." Djoliba AC, Mamahira AC, AS Avenir, JS Centre Salif Keita, CS Duguwolofila, AS Bamako and Cercle Olympique de Bamako were later fined 20,000 CFA francs each for refusing to play their final regular season matches.

The championship play-off (Carré d'As in French) was planned to be played between the top two teams in each pool. However, Djoliba AC forfeited the play-off before it started, leaving the other three to play a three-way 'home and away' round-robin, although every match was played at the Stade du 26 Mars in Bamako. Stade Malien won their first three games (1-0 and 3–0 against Yeelen, 1–0 against AS Real) and thus became champions with a game to spare. Yeelen Olympique beat AS Real Bamako 2-1 and 1–0 to secure second place and a berth in the 2020-21 CAF Confederation Cup in only their first season in the Premiere Division.

At the other end of the table, the four bottom teams in each pool were forced into the Relegation Play-Off. These were AS Bamako, AS Avenir, AS Performance and Mamahira AC from Pool A, and AS Olympique de Messira, JS Centre Salif Keita, AS Sabana and US Bougouni from Pool B. From these, AS Avenir, AS Bamako, JS Centre Salif Keita and Mamahira AC withdrew from the play-off, leaving four teams to fight for two survival spots. US Bougouni reversed their fortunes from the main phase and won all three matches without conceding a goal, and AS Olympique de Messira beat AS Sabana and AS Performance to grab the second spot, condemning the latter to relegation together with the previously withdrawn teams.

== Main Stage ==
=== Pool A ===
Pos	Team	Pld	W	D	L	GF	GA	GD	Pts	Qualification or relegation
1	Djoliba AC	22	15	6	1	37	12	+25	51	Championship Play-off
2	AS Real Bamako	22	12	4	6	42	19	+23	40	Championship Play-off
3	AS Police de Bamako	22	10	7	5	25	15	+10	37	
4	CS Duguwolofila	22	10	5	7	26	16	+10	35	
5	Lafia Club de Bamako	22	10	4	8	28	29	−1	34	
6	AS Bakaridjan	22	8	8	6	20	16	+4	32	
7	AS Nianan	22	7	7	8	23	34	−11	28	
8	Sonni AC	22	6	8	8	19	25	−6	26	
9	AS Bamako	22	5	9	8	19	17	+2	24	Relegation Play-off
10	AS Avenir	22	4	7	11	13	37	−24	19	Relegation Play-off
11	AS Performance	22	3	7	12	19	34	−15	16	Relegation Play-off
12	Mamahira AC de Kati	22	3	6	13	13	30	−17	15	Relegation Play-off

Source: Soccerway
Rules for classification: 1) Points; 2) Head-to-head points

=== Pool B ===
Pos	Team	Pld	W	D	L	GF	GA	GD	Pts	Qualification or relegation
1	Stade Malien	20	17	3	0	37	7	+30	54	Championship Play-off
2	Yeelen Olympique	20	12	3	5	39	22	+17	39	Championship Play-off
3	Onze Créateurs de Niaréla	20	10	6	4	16	9	+7	36 (Note: Head-to-head record: Onze Créateurs 1–0 Cercle Olympique, Cercle Olympique 0–1 Onze Créateurs.)	
4	Cercle Olympique de Bamako	20	11	3	6	27	15	+12	36	
5	USC Kita	20	10	4	6	17	12	+5	34	
6	AS Black Stars de Badalabougou	20	6	6	8	24	30	−6	24 (Note: Head-to-head record: USFAS 0-0 AS Black Stars, AS Black Stars 2-0 USFAS.)	
7	USFAS Bamako	20	7	3	10	21	22	−1	24	
8	AS Olympique de Messira	20	6	5	9	16	26	−10	23	Relegation Play-off
9	JS Centre Salif Keita	20	4	5	11	21	23	−2	17	Relegation Play-off
10	AS Sabana	20	3	2	15	15	41	−26	11	Relegation Play-off
11	US Bougouni	20	2	4	14	10	36	−26	10	Relegation Play-off

Source: Soccerway
Rules for classification: 1) Points; 2) Head-to-head points

== Play-Offs ==
=== Championship play-off ===
Pos	Team	Pld	W	D	L	GF	GA	GD	Pts	Qualification
1	Stade Malien (C)	4	3	1	0	6	1	+5	10	Qualification for 2020-21 CAF Champions League
2	Yeelen Olympique	4	2	0	2	3	5	−2	6	Qualification for 2020-21 CAF Confederation Cup
3	AS Real Bamako	4	0	1	3	2	5	−3	1	
4	Djoliba AC	0	0	0	0	0	0	0	0	Withdrew

Source: Soccerway
(C) Champions

=== Relegation play-off ===
Pos	Team	Pld	W	D	L	GF	GA	GD	Pts	Relegation
1	US Bougouni	3	3	0	0	4	0	+4	9	
2	AS Olympique de Messira	3	2	0	1	6	2	+4	6	
3	AS Performance (R)	3	1	0	2	4	4	0	3	Relegated to Malian Regional Leagues
4	AS Sabana (R)	3	0	0	3	2	10	−8	0	Relegated to Malian Regional Leagues
5	AS Avenir (R)	0	0	0	0	0	0	0	0	Withdrew and Relegated to Malian Regional Leagues
6	AS Bamako (R)	0	0	0	0	0	0	0	0	Withdrew and Relegated to Malian Regional Leagues
7	JS Centre Salif Keita (R)	0	0	0	0	0	0	0	0	Withdrew and Relegated to Malian Regional Leagues
8	Mamahira AC de Kati (R)	0	0	0	0	0	0	0	0	Withdrew and Relegated to Malian Regional Leagues

Source: Soccerway
(R) Relegated
