= 2023–24 Malian Première Division =

Malian Première Division
- Season: 2023–24
- Dates: 1 November 2023 – May 2024
- Champions: Djoliba
- All statistics correct as of 30 November 2023.

The 2023–24 Malian Première Division is the 57th season of the highest level of professional football in Mali. The season began in November 2023 and it finished in May 2024.

The winners qualified for the 2024–25 CAF Champions League. The 2023–24 Malian Cup winners qualified for the 2024–25 CAF Confederation Cup. The bottom four teams were relegated to the 2024–25 Malian Division 1.

== Overview ==
The league consisted of sixteen teams; the top fourteen teams from the previous season, and two teams promoted from Malian Division 1 (US Bougouba and ATS Koro, replacing Lafia Club de Bamako and Yeelen Olympique). AS Real Bamako entered the season as defending champions.

Unlike previous years, there was no reduction in the number of teams in the league, meaning the league remained at 16 teams for this season. However, the Malian Football Federation (Fémafoot) announced that ahead of planned professionalisation in the 2024–25 season, the league will be reduced to 14 teams, meaning the bottom four teams are relegated at the end of the season, with only two being promoted from Division 1.

Due to the refurbishments of the major stadiums in Bamako, namely Stade 26 Mars, Stade Modibo Kéïta and Stade Mamadou Konaté, the league's start was postponed twice from the initial start date of 7 October. The league eventually started on 1 November, with most games taking place at the sports facilities of Bamako-based clubs, rather than the bigger stadiums.

== League table ==
Pos	Team	Pld	W	D	L	GF	GA	GD	Pts	Qualification or relegation
1	Djoliba AC (C)	30	22	3	5	48	18	+30	69	Qualification for 2024–25 CAF Champions League
2	Stade Malien	30	16	10	4	42	17	+25	58	Qualification for the 2024–25 CAF Confederation Cup (Note: Stade Malien qualified for the CAF Confederation Cup as the 2023-24 Malian Cup winner)
3	AS Real Bamako	30	14	9	7	38	26	+12	51	
4	AS Bakaridjan	30	12	11	7	42	27	+15	47	
5	US Bougouba	30	14	5	11	36	26	+10	47	
6	Afrique Football Élite	30	11	9	10	29	27	+2	42	
7	AS Korofina	30	10	11	9	23	24	−1	41	
8	Binga FC	30	10	10	10	25	27	−2	40	
9	USFAS Bamako	30	10	9	11	29	30	−1	39	
10	Onze Créateurs de Niaréla	30	10	8	12	34	36	−2	38	
11	US Bougouni	30	8	14	8	28	29	−1	38	
12	AS Police de Bamako	30	9	8	13	26	34	−8	35	
13	ATS Koro (R)	30	7	9	14	26	39	−13	30	Relegation to Malian Division 1
14	CO Bamako (R)	30	8	5	17	27	47	−20	29	Relegation to Malian Division 1
15	USC Kita (R)	30	4	12	14	20	39	−19	24	Relegation to Malian Division 1
16	Black Stars (R)	30	4	9	17	26	53	−27	21	Relegation to Malian Division 1

Source: Soccerway
Rules for classification: 1) Points; 2) Goal difference.
(C) Champions; (R) Relegated

== Attendances ==
#	Football club	Average attendance
1	Stade Malien	2,711
2	Djoliba AC	2,573
3	Onze Créateurs de Niaréla	501
4	USFAS Bamako	423
5	AFE	420
6	Binga FC	416
7	AS Black Stars	380
8	AS Police de Bamako	327
9	AS Korofina	284
10	AS Real Bamako	273
11	AS Bakaridjan	227
12	USC Kita	176
13	ATS Koro	160
14	US Bougouba	124
15	US Bougouni	118
16	COB	108
