= 2017 Malian Première Division =

Malian Première Division
- Season: 2017

The 2017 Malian Première Division, started on 4 February 2017, is the 52nd edition of the highest club level football competition in Mali.

The championship was abandoned in December. No title was awarded and no clubs were relegated.

== Standings at abandonment ==
Pos	Team	Pld	W	D	L	GF	GA	GD	Pts
1	Stade Malien (Bamako) (Q)	21	17	4	0	47	5	+42	55
2	USC Kita	21	12	5	4	24	16	+8	41
3	Djoliba Athlétic Club (Bamako)	20	12	4	4	29	8	+21	40
4	Cercle Olympique Bamako	20	10	6	4	24	14	+10	36
5	Lafia Club de Bamako	21	10	5	6	38	19	+19	35
6	Onze Créateurs de Niaréla (Bamako)	21	8	9	4	26	17	+9	33
7	AS Olympique de Messira (Bamako)	21	9	4	8	22	25	−3	31
8	AS Bakaridjan de Barouéli (Ségou)	20	8	5	7	24	18	+6	29
9	AS Réal (Bamako)	21	8	5	8	21	17	+4	29
10	USFAS (Bamako)	21	7	5	9	18	19	−1	26
11	AS Black Stars de Badalabougou (Bamako)	21	7	5	9	24	29	−5	26
12	AS Bamako	20	6	6	8	14	18	−4	24
13	US Bougouni	21	6	5	10	17	31	−14	23
14	Mamahira AC de Kati (Koulikoro)	21	4	8	9	20	33	−13	20
15	JS Centre Salif Kéïta (Bamako) (R)	20	6	1	13	20	32	−12	19
16	CS Duguwolofila de Babanba (Koulikoro) (R)	20	4	5	11	13	25	−12	17
17	AS Nianan de Koulikoro (R)	20	4	5	11	19	37	−18	17
18	Sonni AC (Gao) (R)	20	2	3	15	11	48	−37	9

Updated to match(es) played on unknown. Source:
(Q) Qualified for the phase indicated; (R) Relegated
