= 2024–25 Malian Première Division =

Malian Première Division
- Season: 2024–25
- Dates: 23 November 2024 – May 2025
- Matches: 11
- Goals: 23 (2.09 per match)
- All statistics correct as of 3 December 2024.

The 2024–25 Malian Première Division is the 58th season of the highest level of professional football in Mali. The season began in November 2024 and will finish in May 2025.

The winners qualify for the 2025–26 CAF Champions League. The 2024–25 Malian Cup winners qualify for the 2025–26 CAF Confederation Cup. The bottom Two teams are relegated to the 2025–26 Malian Division 1.

== Overview ==
The league consisted of fourteen teams; the top twelve teams from the previous season, and two teams promoted from Malian Division 1 (Étoiles Mandé and FC Diarra, replacing USC Kita, ATS Koro, CO Bamako and Black Stars). Djoliba AC entered the season as defending champions.

== League table ==
Pos	Team	Pld	W	D	L	GF	GA	GD	Pts	Qualification or relegation
1	Stade Malien (C, Q)	22	16	4	2	43	10	+33	52	Qualification for 2025–26 CAF Champions League
2	Djoliba AC	22	12	8	2	32	9	+23	44	
3	USFAS Bamako	22	10	8	4	23	16	+7	38	
4	Onze Créateurs de Niaréla	22	10	4	8	24	25	−1	34	
5	AS Real Bamako	22	9	7	6	28	20	+8	34	
6	Afrique Football Élite	22	7	8	7	22	19	+3	29	
7	AS Bakaridjan	22	7	8	7	15	18	−3	29	
8	Binga FC	22	6	9	7	26	29	−3	27	
9	US Bougouba	22	7	5	10	28	31	−3	26	
10	AS Police de Bamako	22	6	5	11	18	30	−12	23	
11	US Bougouni	22	6	5	11	12	26	−14	23	
12	AS Korofina	22	5	5	12	13	25	−12	20	
13	FC Diarra (R)	22	3	10	9	20	28	−8	19	Relegation to Malian Division 1
14	Étoiles Mandé (R)	22	5	4	13	16	34	−18	19	Relegation to Malian Division 1

Source: Soccerway
Rules for classification: 1) Points; 2) Goal difference.
(C) Champions; (Q) Qualified for the phase indicated; (R) Relegated
