= 2014–15 Malian Première Division =

Malian Première Division
- Season: 2014–15
- Matches played: 110
- Goals scored: 222 (2.02 per match)
- Biggest home win: Mamahira 5-0 Nianan (14 March 2015)
- Biggest away win: Bakaridjan 0-3 COB (20 February 2015); Mamahira 0-3 Onze Créateurs (20 February 2015); Nianan 1-4 Djoliba (29 March 2015)
- Highest scoring: Nianan 4-3 Avenir (21 February 2015)
- Longest winning run: Nianan (5)
- Longest unbeaten run: Onze Créateurs (14)
- Longest winless run: Sabana (7)
- Longest losing run: Avenir (5)

The 2014–15 Malian Première Division was the 50th edition of the highest club level football competition in Mali.

== Standings ==
Pos	Team	Pld	W	D	L	GF	GA	GD	Pts	Qualification or relegation
1	Stade Malien	14	8	4	2	24	9	+15	28	2016 CAF Champions League
2	Onze Créateurs	14	6	8	0	20	9	+11	26	2016 CAF Champions League
3	AS Réal	14	7	5	2	19	9	+10	26	2016 CAF Confederation Cup
4	Duguwolofila	14	8	2	4	17	11	+6	26	
5	Bakaridjan	14	6	4	4	13	11	+2	22	
6	COB	14	5	8	1	11	12	−1	23	
7	Djoliba	14	6	3	5	14	17	−3	21	
8	Centre Salif Keita	12	4	2	6	11	13	−2	14	
9	Nianan	14	6	1	7	16	23	−7	19	
10	USFAS	14	5	3	6	12	13	−1	18	
11	Mamahira	13	4	4	5	17	13	+4	16	
12	ASB	14	4	3	7	12	12	0	15	
13	AS Police	14	3	5	6	11	16	−5	14	
14	ASOM	13	3	3	7	9	11	−2	12	Relegation to Regional Leagues
15	Sabana	14	2	6	6	9	22	−13	12	Relegation to Regional Leagues
16	Avenir	14	1	3	10	7	28	−21	6	Relegation to Regional Leagues

Updated to match(es) played on 7 May 2015. Source: FIFA.com
Rules for classification: 1) points; 2) goal difference; 3) number of goals scored.
