= Sadio Kanouté =

Malian footballer (born 1996)

Personal information
- Full name: Sadio Kanouté
- Date of birth: 21 October 1996 (age 30)
- Place of birth: Bamako, Mali
- Height: 1.86 m (6 ft 1 in)
- Position: Central midfielder

Senior career*
Years	Team	Apps	(Gls)
2012–2021	Stade Malien		
2021	Al-Ahly Benghazi		
2021–2024	Simba	39+	(4+)
2024–2025	JS Kabylie	13	(1)
2025–	Azam		

International career^{‡}
2019–2021	Mali A'	7	(0)
Medal record
Men's football
Representing Mali
African Nations Championship
Silver medal – second place	2020 Cameroon	Team
- * Club domestic league appearances and goals as of 20:12, 3 February 2025 (UTC) ‡ National team caps and goals as of 23:15, 24 March 2021 (UTC)

Sadio Kanouté (born 21 October 1996) is a Malian professional footballer who plays as a central midfielder for Tanzanian Premier League club Azam.

== Career ==
In July 2024, Kanouté signed a two-year contract, with JS Kabylie. In February 2025, he was released by JSK.

== International career ==
Kanouté made his debut, with the Mali national team, in a 0–0 2020 African Nations Championship qualification tie, against Mauritania, on 21 September 2019.

== Honours ==
=== Club ===
Stade Malien

- Malian Première Division: 2012–13, 2013–14, 2014–15, 2016, 2019–20, 2020–21
- Malian Cup: 2013, 2015, 2018, 2021
- Malian Super Cup: 2014, 2015
- Malian Super Cup runner-up: 2013, 2016

Simba

- Tanzanian Super Cup: 2023
- Mapinduzi Cup: 2022
- Muungano Cup: 2024
- Tanzanian Super Cup runner-up: 2021

=== International ===
Mali A'

- African Nations Championship runner-up: 2020

=== Individual ===
- African Nations Championship team of the tournament: 2020
- Top scorer in African Football League: 2023 (2 goals)
