= Djigui Diarra =

Malian footballer (born 1995)

Personal information
- Date of birth: 27 February 1995 (age 31)
- Place of birth: Bamako, Mali
- Height: 1.79 m (5 ft 10 in)
- Position: Goalkeeper

Team information
- Current team: Young Africans
- Number: 39

Senior career*
Years	Team	Apps	(Gls)
2011–2021	Stade Malien		
2021–	Young Africans	72	(0)

International career^{‡}
2015	Mali U20	7	(0)
2015	Mali U23	3	(0)
2015–	Mali	80	(0)
- * Club domestic league appearances and goals as of 31 March 2024 (UTC) ‡ National team caps and goals as of 21:03, 29 September 2026 (UTC)

Djigui Diarra (born 27 February 1995) is a Malian professional footballer who plays as a goalkeeper for Tanzanian Premier League club Young Africans and the Mali national team. He also represented his country at the 2015 FIFA U-20 World Cup, where they achieved a third-place finish.

== Club career ==
Diarra joined Tanzanian club Young Africans in August 2021.

== International career ==
=== Youth ===
Diarra was set to represent his country at the 2015 African U-20 Championship, but broke his hand during a CAF Champions League match against AS GNN, and was ultimately not selected for the squad.

In May 2015, he was named in Mali's squad to represent the national under-20 team at the 2015 FIFA U-20 World Cup in New Zealand. Diarra, the team captain, blocked nine shots, including a penalty, in their quarterfinal match against Germany. They eventually won by penalty shootout, by a score of 4–3. They were eliminated in the semifinals by Serbia, but defeated Senegal in the third-place match.

Additionally, he earned three caps with the Mali under-23 national team during the 2015 Africa U-23 Cup of Nations in late 2015, recording one shutout.

=== Senior ===
Diarra was called up to the Mali national team for the 2016 African Nations Championship qualification, and made his senior international debut during the preliminary round, in a 3–1 victory against Guinea-Bissau on 5 July 2015. He also appeared in a 2–1 victory against Mauritania on 18 October. With these victories, Mali qualified for the 2016 African Nations Championship, held in Rwanda. Diarra was once again named to the 23-man squad, and recorded three shutouts in six matches while Mali reached the finals, where they lost 3–0 to DR Congo. Diarra was named to the Tournament XI as a substitute.

On 11 December 2025, Diarra was called up to the Mali squad for the 2025 Africa Cup of Nations.

== Career statistics ==
As of matches played on 29 September 2026

Appearances and goals by national team and year
National team	Year	Apps	Goals
Mali	2015	2	0
Mali	2016	10	0
Mali	2017	7	0
Mali	2018	5	0
Mali	2019	14	0
Mali	2020	2	0
Mali	2021	8	0
Mali	2022	1	0
Mali	2023	4	0
Mali	2024	13	0
Mali	2025	9	0
Mali	2026	5	0
Total		80	0

== Honours ==
Stade Malien

- Malian Première Division: 2012–13, 2013–14, 2014–15, 2016, 2019–20, 2020–21
- Malian Cup: 2013, 2015, 2018
- Malian Super Cup: 2014, 2015
- Tanzania Premier League: 2021, 2022

Mali

- African Nations Championship runners-up: 2016

Mali U20

- FIFA U-20 World Cup third place: 2015

Individual

- CAF Team of the Year: 2015 (as a substitute)
- African Nations Championship Best XI: 2016 (as a substitute)
- Malian Première Division Player of the Year: 2014–15
- Best goalkeeper of Tanzania Premier League (NBC): 2021–22
