= Mamadou Soro =

Ivorian footballer (born 1993)

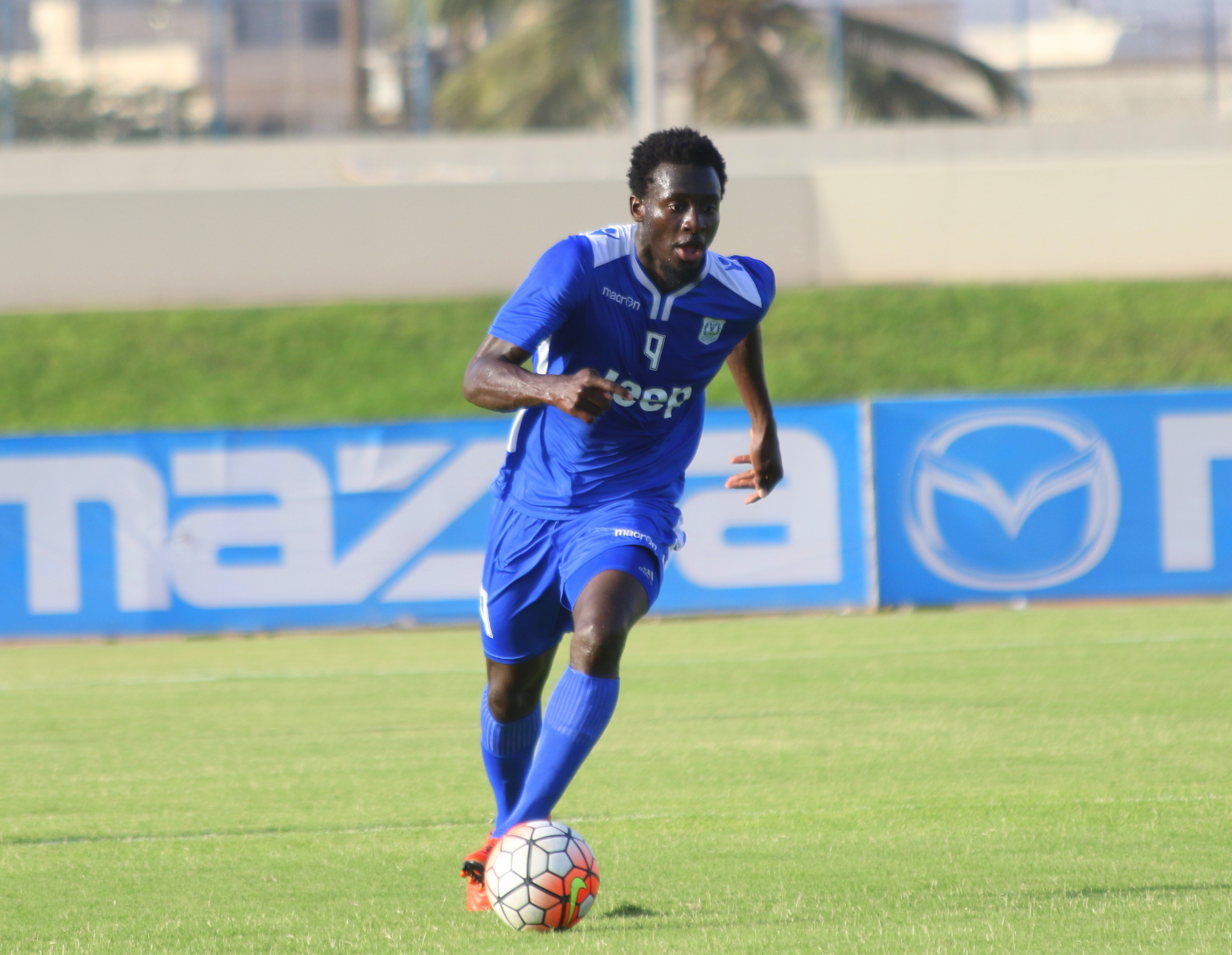
- Soro in action with Al-Nasr Salalah in 2016

Personal information
- Date of birth: 20 April 1993 (age 33)
- Place of birth: Tioro, Ivory Coast
- Height: 1.90 m (6 ft 3 in)
- Position: Forward

Team information
- Current team: Al-Zawraa

Youth career
- 2010: OSA

Senior career*
Years	Team	Apps	(Gls)
2010–2012	Onze Créateurs	42	(20)
2012–2013	AFAD Djékanou	18	(10)
2013–2014	RS Berkane	25	(8)
2015–2016	Al-Nasr	20	(11)
2016–2017	FC Fredericia	20	(2)
2017–2019	Le Mans	62	(20)
2019–2020	Al-Shoulla	35	(16)
2020–2021	Al-Bukayriyah	35	(15)
2021–2022	Al-Khaleej	37	(16)
2022–2023	Qadsia	15	(4)
2023–2024	Al-Batin		
2024–2025	Al-Zawraa		

International career
2010	Ivory Coast U23		
- * Club domestic league appearances and goals as of 08:17, 10 March 2023 (UTC)

Mamadou Soro Nanga (born 20 April 1993) is an Ivorian professional footballer who plays as a forward for Al-Zawraa.

== Club career ==
=== Youth career ===
Born and raised in Tioro, Ivory Coast, Mamadou began his footballing career in 2010 at the age of 17 with one of Ivory Coast's renown football schools, Olympic Sport d'Abobo (commonly known as OSA).

=== Onze Créateurs ===
Mamadou first moved out of Ivory Coast in 2010 to Mali where he signed a two-year contract with Malian Première Division club, Onze Créateurs de Niaréla. He scored 8 goals in 18 appearances in the 2010–11 Malian Première Division and 12 goals in 24 appearances in the 2011–12 Malian Première Division.

=== AFAD Djékanou ===
In October 2012, he moved back to Ivory Coast where he signed a one-year contract Ligue 1 club, Academie de Foot Amadou Diallo, also known as AFAD Djékanou. He scored 10 goals in 18 appearances in the 2012–13 Ligue 1 and helped his side secure the 2nd position in the championship and also helped the Abidjan-based club enter the 2013 CAF Champions League. He made his CAF Champions League debut on 17 February 2013 in a 5–1 win over Sierra Leonean side, Diamond Stars F.C., in a match where Mamdou created history by scoring all the five goals for his side. Later in the first round of the qualifiers, he was again on target in the second leg in a 2–1 loss against Cameroonian side, Coton Sport FC de Garoua.

=== RS Berkane ===
In 2013, he again moved out of Ivory Coast, this time to Morocco, where he signed a one-year contract with Botola club, Nahdat Berkane, also known as RS Berkane. He made his Botola debut on 25 August 2013 in a 1–0 loss against Moghreb Tétouan and scored his first goal on 30 August 2013 in a 1–0 win over Olympic Safi. He scored 3 goals in 25 appearances in the 2013–14 Botola.

=== Al-Nasr ===
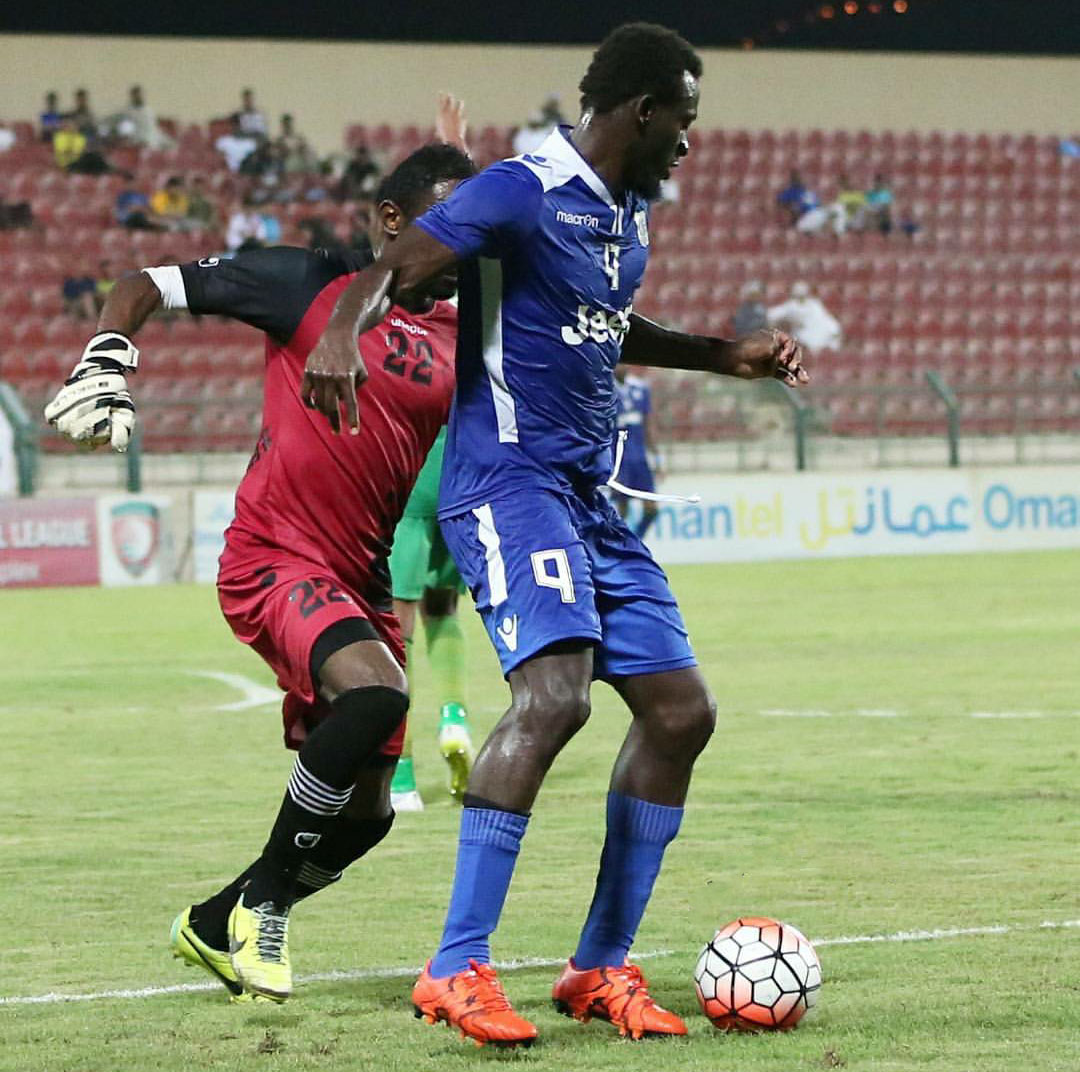
Mamadou Soro FNanga - Al-Nasr S.C.S.C.

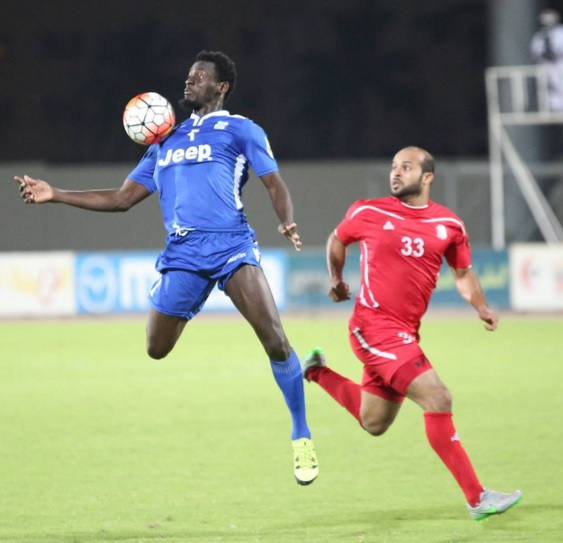
Mamadou Soro Nanga - Oman Professional League

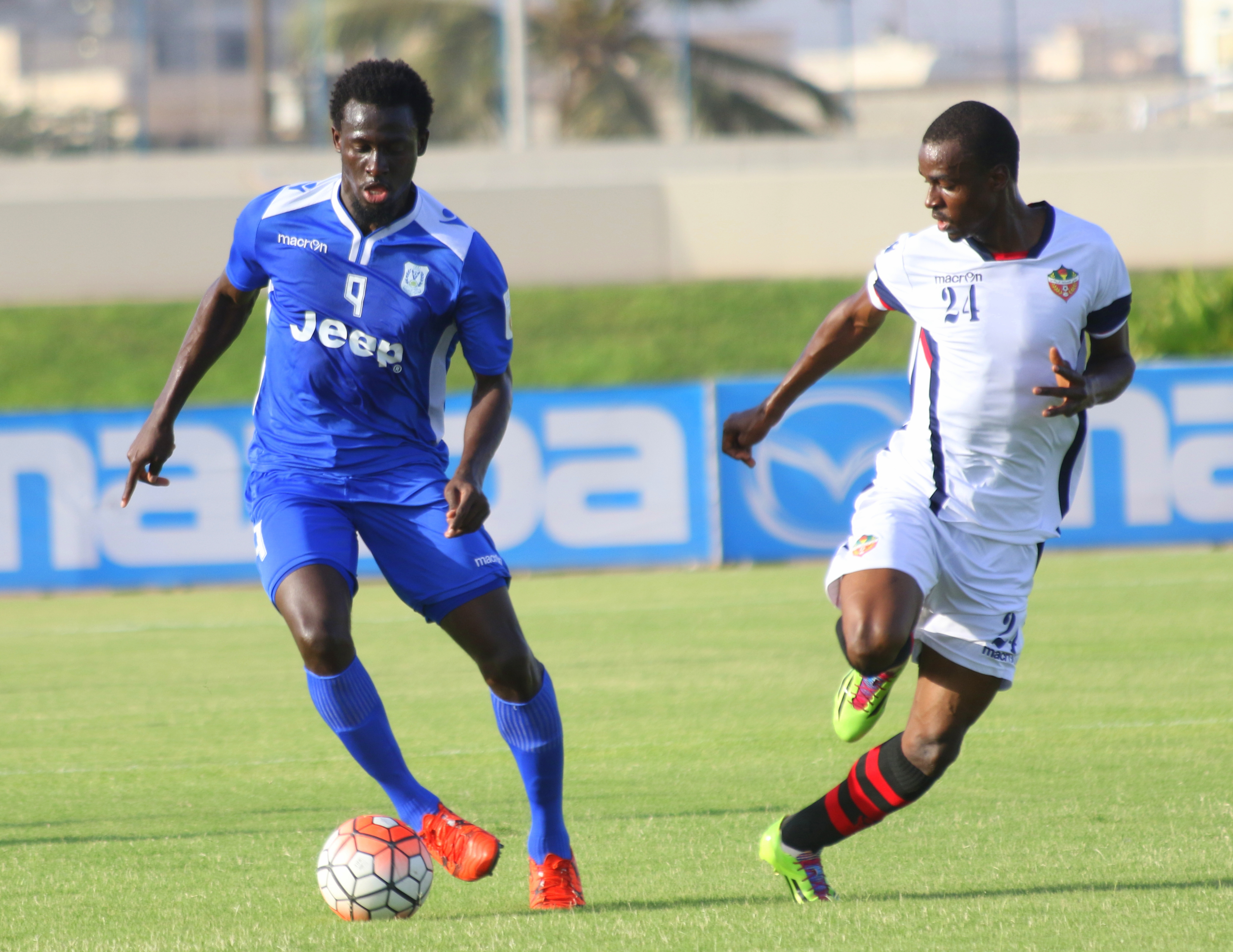
Mamadou Soro Nanga - Oman Professional League Cup

In 2015, he again moved out of Ivory Coast, this time to Oman, where on 12 September 2015, he signed a one-year contract with Salalah-based, Oman Professional League club, Al-Nasr S.C.S.C. He made his Oman Professional League and scored his first goal on 13 September 2015 in the first game of the 2015–16 Oman Professional League in a 2–1 loss against Al-Suwaiq Club and thus also became the first goal-scorer of the 2015–16 Oman Professional League season.

=== FC Fredericia ===
He first moved to Europe in August 2016 to Denmark, where he signed a one-year contract with Danish 1st Division club FC Fredericia. He left the club at the end of the season.

=== Le Mans ===
Soro signed a contract with Championnat National 2 side Le Mans in the summer of 2017. He scored the winning goal in their promotion playoff match against Ajaccio earning Le Mans promotion to Ligue 2.

=== Al-Shoulla ===
In August 2019, Soro signed a two-year contract with Al-Shoulla of the Prince Mohammad bin Salman League (Saudi second tier).

=== Al-Bukayriyah ===
In September 2020, Soro signed a one-year contract with Al-Bukayriyah of the Prince Mohammad bin Salman League (Saudi second tier).

=== Al-Khaleej ===
On 23 August 2021, Soro signed a one-year contract with Al-Khaleej of the Prince Mohammad bin Salman League (Saudi second tier).

=== Qadsia ===
On 22 June 2022, Soro joined Kuwaiti club Qadsia.

=== Al-Batin ===
On 4 August 2023, Soro returned to Saudi Arabia and joined Al-Batin.

== Career statistics ==
Appearances and goals by club, season and competition
Club	Season	League			Cup		Continental		Other		Total	
Club	Season	Division	Apps	Goals	Apps	Goals	Apps	Goals	Apps	Goals	Apps	Goals
Onze Créateurs	2010–11	Malian Première Division	18	8	0	0	0	0	0	0	18	8
Onze Créateurs	2011–12	Malian Première Division	24	12	0	0	0	0	0	0	24	12
Onze Créateurs	Total		42	20	0	0	0	0	0	0	42	20
AFAD Djékanou	2012–13	Ligue 1 (Ivory Coast)	18	10	0	0	4	6	0	0	22	16
RS Berkane	2013–14	Botola	25	8	0	0	0	0	0	0	25	8
Al-Nasr	2015–16	Oman Professional League	17	8	4	3	0	0	0	0	21	11
Fredericia	2016–17	Danish 1st Division	20	2	0	0	0	0	0	0	20	2
Le Mans	2017-18	Championnat National 2	28	16	2	1	0	0	0	0	30	17
Le Mans	2018–19	Championnat National	34	4	1	0	0	0	0	0	35	4
Le Mans	Total		62	20	3	1	0	0	0	0	65	21
Le Mans II	2018–19	Championnat National 3	1	1	0	0	0	0	0	0	1	1
Al-Shoulla	2019–20	Prince Mohammad bin Salman League	22	13	1	0	0	0	0	0	23	13
Career total			207	82	8	4	4	6	0	0	219	92

== Honours ==
Al-Nasr S.C.S.C.

- Oman Professional League Cup: 2015–16

Al-Khaleej

- First Division: 2021–22
