= Ousmane Farota =

Malian footballer (died 2023)

Personal information
- Date of birth: 6 December 1964
- Date of death: 26 March 2023 (aged 58)
- Position: Goalkeeper

Senior career*
Years	Team	Apps	(Gls)
1982–1986	AS Real Bamako		
1990–1998	Stade Malien		

International career
1988–1997	Mali MNT	20	(0)
- * Club domestic league appearances and goals

Ousmane Farota (6 December 1964 – 26 March 2023) was a Malian footballer who played as a goalkeeper. He played primarily for Stade Malien. Farota was a stalwart of the Mali national team in the late 1980s and early 1990s and played in the 1994 African Cup of Nations. His performances earned him considerable praise and he was voted the tournament's outstanding goalkeeper.
