= Avenir Club Tombouctou =

Malian football club

Avenir AC
- Full name: Avenir Club Tombouctou
- Founded: 24 February 2011; 15 years ago
- Ground: Timbuktu Municipal Stadium; Timbuktu, Mali
- Chairman: Modibo Koibara
- Coach: Diadji Toure
- League: Malian Second Division
- 2025–2026: 1st
Home colours	Away colours

L'Avenir Club de Tombouctou, better known as Avenir AC, is a Malian football club based in Timbuktu. It plays at the Timbuktu Municipal Stadium.

The club participated in the Malian Première Division Football Championship during the 2014-2015 season. At the end of that season, it finished in last place and was relegated.

== History ==
Avenir AC represents the city of Timbuktu in competitions organized by the Malian Football Federation.

The club played in the Malian Première Division during the 2014-2015 season. After a difficult season, it was relegated to the second division. This relegation was the subject of proceedings before the relevant authorities.

In 2023, the club won the Timbuktu regional championship and then the regional final tournament, thus qualifying for the promotion tournament to Ligue 2.

== Stadium ==
Avenir AC plays its home matches at the Municipal Stadium of Tombouctou.

== Rankings ==
- Timbuktu Regional Champion: 2023
