= Stade Municipal de Koulikoro =

Football stadium in Koulikoro, Mali

Coordinates: 12°52′30″N 7°32′56″W

Stade Municipal de Koulikoro is located in Koulikoro, Mali. It is used mostly for football and serves as the home stadium of AS Nianan. The stadium has a capacity of 8,000 people.
