= Mohamed Djila =

Malian footballer

Mohamed Djila is a former Malian international footballer of the 1980s and 1990s.

Djila spent much of his career with Stade Malien.
