= Yeelen Olympique =

Malian association football club based in Bamako

- Full name: Centre Yeelen Olympique
- Nickname: Yeelenitos
- Founded: 2003
- Ground: Stade du 26 Mars; Stade Mamadou Konaté
- Capacity: 50,000; 1,000
- Chairman: (Mali) Khalilou Camara
- League: Malien Première Division
- 2022–23: 16th (Relegated)

Yeelen Olympique is a Malian association football club based in Bamako, Mali. It was founded in August 2003 as a platform for young aspiring footballers to develop while receiving academic support. The club played in the top-flight of Malian football between 2019–20, when it finished 2nd, until 2022–23 when they were relegated after finishing bottom.

== History ==
The club was founded in August 2003 in Bamako and played its first match in February 2004. The club first won silverware in November 2016 by winning the Coupe Acefoot, before winning the third tier and gaining promotion to the second tier in June 2007. After winning the 2017-18 Tournoi de Montée, Yeelen gained promotion into the Malian Première Division for the first time in their history for the 2019-20 season.

In the club's inaugural top flight season, Yeelen Olympique exceeded all expectations and finished 2nd in Pool B, thus qualifying for the Carré d'As, the Championship Play-Off. Following 2-1 and 1-0 wins against AS Real Bamako, and 0-1 and 0-3 losses against eventual champions Stade Malien, Yeelen secured second place and a spot in the 2020-21 CAF Confederation Cup.

Yeelen were drawn against US GN of Niger in the preliminary round of the 2020–21 CAF Confederation Cup. They lost the first leg at home 0–1, before managing a 1–1 draw in the second leg in Niamey, which culminated in a 2–1 loss on aggregate and their elimination from the competition.

== Honours ==
- Malian Première Division
  - Runners-up (1): 2019–20
- Malian Championnat D2
  - Winners (1): 2017–18
- Malian Championnat D3
  - Winners (1): 2006–07

== Performance in CAF competitions ==
As of March 2021

Season	Competition	Round	Club	Home	Away	Aggregate
2020-21	CAF Confederation Cup	Preliminary round	(Niger) US GN	0–1	1–1	1–2

== Notable players ==
Below are the notable former players who have played top flight football in Europe or have represented the Mali national team.

- (Mali) Mamadou Sangare
- (Mali) Moussa Djenepo
- (Mali) Adama Niane
- (Mali) Youba Diarra
- (Mali) Amadou Dante
- (Mali) Ousmane Diakite
- (Mali) Falaye Sacko
