= Stade Malien =

Association football club in Mali

- Full name: Stade Malien de Bamako
- Nicknames: les Blancs le Stade les Stadiens
- Founded: 1960; 66 years ago
- Ground: Stade 26 Mars, Bamako, Mali
- Capacity: 50,000
- Chairman: Boukari Sidibé
- Manager: Pascal Janin
- League: Malien Première Division
- 2023–24: 2nd of 16
Home colours	Away colours

Stade Malien is a Malian professional football and sports club based in Bamako. One of the two dominant clubs of Malian football, their eastern Bamako training grounds host other sports as well, including a successful basketball club.

== Football club ==
Stade Malien de Bamako was founded in 1960 as a result of a fusion between Jeanne d'Arc and Espérance de Bamako. Second only to Djoliba AC of Bamako in success, Stade Malien are their primary rivals. Stade plays its matches in the Stade 26 mars in the city centre, but is based in the eastern industrial outskirts of the city in the Sotuba neighborhood. In 2006, it built a large training facility there, where a full stadium is being constructed. This is also the base for Stade Malien's youth and development clubs. The U-17 in particular has been successful internationally, having competed in the Under 17 Club Championships in Spain in 2007.

=== Shield and colors ===
The emblem of the club is based on the city seal of Bamako, featuring three crocodiles. The team plays in white (from which it earns the nickname "les Blancs") and blue.

=== History ===
Stade Malien has inherited much of the history of Jeanne d'Arc du Soudan, founded in 1938 by two French-Africans and the missionary Révérend Père Bouvier. The name was borrowed from Jeanne d'Arc Dakar, and the white uniforms from the White Fathers, which Stade retain. JA du Soudan was one of the most successful clubs of the pre-independence period, winning the AOF Cup in 1953 and 1956 and reaching the finals in 1951 and 1959 (the last played). They reached the "coupe du Soudan" finals 6 times, winning four years (1950, 1951, 1952, 1955) and losing 2 (1947, 1948). Among their biggest rivals was "Africa Sport" of Bamako, who became Djoliba AC in 1960. JA's most famous players were Mamadou "Coulou" Coulibaly, Seydou Ndaw, Seydou Thiam, Cheick Oumar Diallo, Bacoroba "Baco" Touré, and Oumar Sy.

Espérance de Bamako was founded in 1958 as a student youth club, overseen by Fernand Diarra and captained by the young Bakary Samaké.

At independence, the two Bamako clubs fused, to become Stade Malian de Bamako in 1960. In the first Coupe du Mali, Stade and Djoliba reached the two match final in 1961. Tied 3–3 after the first match, Stade carried the cup 2–1 in the second.

Stade reached the first final of the African Cup of Champions Clubs in 1964–65. On 7 February 1965, Stade lost 2–1 to Oryx Douala played at Kumassi Ghana, but is remembered for the great play of star defender Souleymane "Solo" Coulibaly. Other famous early players for the Blancs were Yacouba Samabaly, Bakary Samaké, Sama Bass and Coach Oumar Sy. The great Salif Keita briefly appeared for the club.

During the 1968–91 military dictatorship of Moussa Traoré, many fans of Stade Malien felt that the government unfairly favored Djoliba AC. Heroes of this era include Mamadou Kéita "Capi", Issa Yatassaye, Osumane Farota, Drissa Coulibaly, Abdoulaye Kaloga, Moussa "Gigla" Traoré.

Stade Malien participated in the 1970 cup final and won their third title after defeating Kayésienne (now part of AS Sigui) 10-0 and is the highest cup final result to date.

=== 1990s – 2000s ===
Stade's fortunes have been mixed since then, but are always near the top of the Malian league. The highpoints of the 1990s were their 1992 winning of the "Eyadéma Cup" in the UFOA Championship and their 1993–95 three-in-a-row league championships. The club enjoyed a spell of dominance under two periods under the management of Ghanaian football legend Karim Abdul Razak. He coached Stade for two seasons in the early 2000s, was lured back for a season to Asante Kotoko, and then returned for two more seasons to Bamako, fired by the Ghana side despite having brought them their first championship in ten years. During the 2000–01 season, Razak led Stade to not only a cup and league double, but guided the club to their first season ever unbeaten in every league and cup match.

Recent players of note have included Modibo Maïga (2000–04), Mohamed Kabore (2002) Boucader Diallo, Mohamed Djila, Bassala Toure, Djélimory Kané, Rafan Sidibé, Mohammed Muyei, and coach Karim Abdul Razak. Recent players capped to the Mali national football team include Lassine Diarra, Dramane Traoré (1999–01), Adama Diakité, Souleymane Dembele (2003–04) Harouna Diarra, Boucader Diallo, and Soumbeyla Diakité (2003–05).

==== Jeanne d'Arc FC ====
At the end of the 2006–07 season, a group of Stade supporters broke away to form their own football club, taking the "Jeanne d'Arc" name with them. They formed Jeanne d'Arc FC, which competed in lower division football. In September 2008, Jeanne d'Arc became champions of the Groupe B league soccer tournament, one of two regional tournaments which promotes teams to the Malien Première Division, and competed against their former counterparts during the 2008–09 season.

==== Malien Première Division 2007/08 ====
Reigning champions from the 2007 Malien Première Division, Stade and rivals Djoliba sat atop the standings the entire season, with Djoliba leading in the run up to the final games. Their 7 July derby match was postponed to August, and although they beat their rivals, Stade finished the season 9 points behind champions Djoliba. The only other meeting between the two rivals in the season was in the Semi-finals of the Malien Cup, where Stade faced the humiliation of a 5–0 drubbing by Djoliba. Stade were eliminated from the CAF Champions League 2008 by Primeiro de Agosto of Angola in the early stages. In the league, their biggest win was a 5–0 defeat of USFAS Bamako on 14 July at home, with scorers Lassana Diallo, Karim Sogoba, Lassine Diarra, and Bakary Coulibaly scoring two. In June, eight points behind the leaders, Stade replaced manager Cheick Diallo with Cheick Oumar Koné from Malian Army club Scorpions de Bamako. Despite winning eight of their nine last matches (they lost 1–0 away to JS Centre Salif Keita on 14 August), Djoliba handily took the cup and league double. While other reasons were given, the removal of the Club Director Mahamadou Samaké at the beginning of September, after eight years at the helm, was reported in the press as a result of this disappointing season. His resignation was subsequently withdrawn.

===== Bamako District Mayor's Cup =====
Stade's highpoint came at the end of the season, winning the "Coupe du Maire du District": the Bamako District Mayor's Cup. But while Stade made it to the final, its victory over arch-rival Djoliba came from legal, rather than on the field factors. In the 44th minute of the match, Djoliba supporters rioted, attacking officials, other fans, and journalists. The match was called off, and several days later, awarded to Stade. Djoliba were fined 500,000 FCFA, all payments for previous matches were withdrawn, and they were excluded from the 2009 competition. Stade received the trophy and a 750,000 F Cfa award from the Mayor of Bamako Adama Sangaré on 23 September.

Earlier in the season, the club brought in two Burkinabé players, goalkeeper Rachid Abdoulaye Compaoré (to supplement national squad keeper Soumaila Diakité who was suspended from CAF play) and striker Moctar Ouédraogo (who has become a starter). They said goodbye to defender Amadou "Docteur" Diallo and longtime central defender and Captain Boucader Diallo.

==== 2008/09 season ====
Stade Malien competed in 2008–09 Malian Première Division, beginning 12 December 2008. By the end of January 2009, with six matches played, Stade had slumped to one of their worst starts, winning only one match, and drawing only one. That draw came on the home leg of their derby match with Djoliba, holding them 1–1 with a 60-minute equaliser from Stade's Adama Touré. They stood at 11th of 14 clubs in the standings. Following a particularly poor result, a group of Stade fans attacked the home of a match official, and incurred a one million FCFA fine from FEMIFOOT. Standing just nine points off relegation on 10 February, the board sacked three players and manager Cheick Oumar Koné, replacing him with goalkeeping coach and former Malian international Yatouma Diop on an interim basis. On 12 February, the club's board announced Djibril Dramé, formerly of the Malian national team would become manager of the club.

==== The 2009 African Confederation Cup Winner ====
Stade Malien won the Confederation Cup for the year 2009 in a hard-fought battle against the Algerian giant Entente Sétif. Stade had initially suffered a 2–0 defeat to ES Sétif in the first leg of the cup's final, with its key players blaming the defeat on an unfriendly whether in Sétif. However, in the second leg, which was played on 5 December 2009 before 20–50.000 spectators at Modibo Keita Stadium in the Malian capital, the Bamako-based team stunningly overcame the Algerian side 3–2 on penalties after the regular 90 min. ended in favor of "Les Blancs" 2–0, which had tied the games of the two legs overall. This conclusive victory of Stade Malien was first of its kind in the history of Malian football as the country had never before won a real continental cup. Stade Malien and AS Real de Bamako as well as the country's national team, les Aigles du Mali, had been high value continental runner-up in the years of 1964, 1966, and 1972. But it is Stade Malien that finally received a continental trophy for the satisfaction of the Malian football fans.

=== Directorship ===
The club is a membership organisation, supported by subscription, with elected leadership. The organisation is advised by a General Assembly (L’assemblée générale du Stade malien) and run by an executive committee ("Le comité exécutif du Stade malien de Bamako") chosen by the Assembly. As the Assembly meets every few years, the business and supporters committees (comité de gestion and comité des supporters) elect directors (the supporters "central bureau" elect a president – Mamadou Diané in 2005) who, in the Assembly, choose an executive board. The president of the executive board runs the club. The system is not without controversy, primarily over funds and choice of players. A previous manager claims he was removed when he did not make squad choices dictated by the executive board.

From 2000 Stade Malien's president has been Bamako businessman Mahamadou Samaké (known as "SAM"). In September 2006 Samaké was elected to his third consecutive three year mandate as president. In August 2008, he announced he was stepping down nominally to accept a promotion in his business work, it is rumored his resignation had more to do with more than a season of disappointing on field results. Within two weeks, Samaké's resignation was rescinded: Samaké announced he would finish his third three-year term as President of the club, scheduled to end in September 2009. Samaké is also Mali director for Randgold mining in Mali, and a former professor of Business law at the University of Bamako. Samaké succeeded Mamadou Samabaly in 2000. In 2008, the Executive Vice President of the club was Youssouf Coulibaly. In 2007, the board named three men Honorary Presidents for Life: Dioncounda Samabaly, Mody Sylla, and Amadou Beydi Wane.

=== Recent history ===
Stade Malien would go on to win four straight titles. In 2013, they finished with 79 points which became a club record and still stands into the present day. In 2015, they won their 20th champ title and became listed in the top 15 world clubs with the most championship titles. Stade Malien, along with Djoliba, Real Bamako and Onze Createurs qualified into the final phase and won their 21st and fourth straight national championship with 14 points, double than second placed Djoliba and have a title less in its championship title totals in Mali, the club later qualified into the continental championships in the following season.

Another Super Cup successes were made in 2009 and 2010 as they got their doubles, the first qualified as a cup runner up as they Djoliba won both the championship and the cup title and the second as champion. In 2011, Stade Malien walked out of the Malian super cup which they lost the title to Cercle Olympique (COB). They came back to the 2013 Super Cup as champion and as the match ended in a scoreless draw, they lost the penalty shootouts do Djoliba 4–2. In 2014, they got two straight Super Cup titles, first in 2014 where they qualified as champion and second was their triple title after winning 4–2 in penalties over Onze Créateurs as the match ended in a scoreless draw.

Stade Malien appeared in the 2017 CAF Champions League. The club faced Liberia's BYC FC, they won the first leg but lost the second leg. As each club had a goal draw, it went into penalty kicks and lost 6–7 to BYC FC. The matches occurred before the Malian Football Federation was dissolved on 10 March due to increased funding from the country's sports ministry amidst a poor Malian economy and later the ban of Malian clubs' appearances at the continentals on 17 March. In early May, all Malian competitions resumed after two months of suspension. Their next match was a goal draw with Real Bamako.

== Sponsors ==
Stade Malien the logo of sponsors Siemens during the 2007–08 seasons, with football kits manufactured by Adidas. At the beginning of the 2007 season, Siemens signed a 50,000 Euro sponsorship deal with the club, and provided an estimated 20,000 Euros in additional services. In August 2008, Stade Malian signed a deal with SOTELMA, the Malian State Telecommunications company, for two seasons at 20 million FCFA a season.

== Honours ==
- CAF Champions League: 1 appearances
  2025–26 – Quarter Final
- CAF Confederation Cup: 2 appearances
  2009 – Champions
  2024–25 – Group stage

=== National ===
- Malien Première Division:
  - Winners (24): 1970, 1972, 1983–84, 1986–87, 1988–89, 1992–93, 1993–94, 1994–95, 1999–2000, 2000–01, 2001–02, 2002–03, 2004–05, 2005–06, 2006–07, 2009–10, 2010–11, 2012–13, 2013–14, 2014–15, 2016, 2019–20, 2020–21, 2024–25
- Malien Cup:
  - Winners (24): 1961, 1963, 1970, 1972, 1982, 1984, 1985, 1986, 1988, 1990, 1992, 1994, 1995, 1997, 1999, 2001, 2006, 2013, 2015, 2018, 2021, 2023, 2024, 2025
- Super Coupe National du Mali:
  - Winners (12): 1987, 1998, 2000, 2001, 2005, 2006, 2007, 2009, 2010, 2014, 2015, 2025

=== Regional ===
- West African Club Championship (UFOA Cup):
  - Winners (1): 1992
- French West African Cup:
  - Winners (2): 1953, 1956 (as Jeanne d'Arc)

== League and cup history ==
=== Performance in CAF competitions ===
As of March 2021

Competition	Matches	W	D	L	GF	GA
African Cup of Champions Clubs / CAF Champions League	89	30	20	39	97	114
CAF Confederation Cup	44	14	16	14	47	45
CAF Cup Winners' Cup	20	6	3	11	17	24
CAF Super Cup	1	0	0	1	0	2
Total	154	50	39	65	161	185

Season	Competition	Round	Country	Club	Home	Away	Aggregate	Replay
1964–65	African Cup of Champions Clubs	R1	(Senegal)	Espoir de Saint-Louis	4–1	1–1	5–2	
1964–65	African Cup of Champions Clubs	R2	(Guinea)	Sily Club de Kindia	2–0	2–4	4–4	3–2
1964–65	African Cup of Champions Clubs	R2	(Ivory Coast)	ASEC Mimosas	3–3	6–4	9–7	
1964–65	African Cup of Champions Clubs	SF	(Ethiopia)	Cotton Factory Club	3–1			
1964–65	African Cup of Champions Clubs	F	(Cameroon)	Oryx Douala	1–2			
1971	African Cup of Champions Clubs	R1	(Senegal)	ASC Diaraf	4–0	0–3	4–3	
1971	African Cup of Champions Clubs	R2	(Ivory Coast)	ASEC Mimosas	2–2	1–2	3–4	
1973	African Cup of Champions Clubs	R2	(Togo)	Modèle de Lomé	2–1	0–0	2–1	
1973	African Cup of Champions Clubs	QF	(Zaire)	AS Vita Club	0–3	1–4	1–7	
1983	CAF Cup Winners' Cup	R1	(Algeria)	JHD Alger	2–1	2–0	2–3	
1985	African Cup of Champions Clubs	R2	(Liberia)	Invincible Eleven	1–1	0–3	1–4^{1}	
1985	African Cup of Champions Clubs	QF	(Algeria)	GCR Mascara	2–0	0–3	2–3	
1987	CAF Cup Winners' Cup	R1	(Morocco)	FAR Rabat	0–1	0–5	0–6	
1988	African Cup of Champions Clubs	R1	(Algeria)	ES Sétif	1–1	0–4	1–5	
1989	CAF Cup Winners' Cup	R1	(Tunisia)	CO Transports	3–0	0–0	3–0	
1989	CAF Cup Winners' Cup	R2	(Algeria)	USL Alger	1–0	0–1	1–1 (3–4 p)	
1990	African Cup of Champions Clubs	R1	(Tunisia)	Espérance	0–1	0–2	0–3	
1991	CAF Cup Winners' Cup	R1	(Ivory Coast)	SC Gagnoa	1–0	0–1	1–1 (4–5 p)	
1993	CAF Cup Winners' Cup	PR	(Guinea)	Hafia FC	1–0	0–2	1–2	
1994	African Cup of Champions Clubs	R1	(Sierra Leone)	East End Lions	2–0	0–2	2–2 (2–3 p)	
1994	African Cup of Champions Clubs	R2	(Tunisia)	Espérance	0–1	0–3	0–4	
1995	African Cup of Champions Clubs	R1	(Guinea)	Horoya AC	1–0	1–1	2–1	
1995	African Cup of Champions Clubs	R2	(Ghana)	Goldfields Obuasi	0–0	0–1	0–1	
1997	CAF Cup	R1	(Algeria)	USM Aïn Beïda	0–1	1–1	1–2	
1998	CAF Cup Winners' Cup		(Tunisia)	Espérance Tunis	1–2	0–1	1–3	
1999	CAF Cup Winners' Cup	R1	(Ivory Coast)	Africa Sports	1–1	0–2	1–3	
2000	CAF Cup Winners' Cup	R1	(Democratic Republic of the Congo)	AmS Dragons	3–0	2–3	2–6	
2000	CAF Cup Winners' Cup	R2	(Niger)	JS du Ténéré	1–1	0–1	1–2	
2001	CAF Champions League	R1	(Ivory Coast)	ASEC Mimosas	2–0	0–2	2–2	
2002	CAF Champions League	R1	(Ghana)	Hearts of Oak	3–1	1–1	4–2	
2002	CAF Champions League	R2	(Senegal)	Jeanne d'Arc	0–3	1–2	1–5	
2003	CAF Champions League	R1	(Republic of the Congo)	AS Police	1–0	1–2	2–2 (a)	
2003	CAF Champions League	R2	(Algeria)	USM Alger	1–1	0–2	1–3	
2004	CAF Champions League	PR	(Ghana)	Hearts of Oak	0–0	0–2	0–2	
2006	CAF Champions League	R1	(Guinea)	Satellite FC	3–0	2–2	5–2	
2006	CAF Champions League	R2	(Equatorial Guinea)	Renacimiento	2–1	0–1	2–2 (a)	
2007	CAF Champions League	R1	(Senegal)	AS Douanes	1–2	0–2	1–4^{2}	
2007	CAF Champions League	R2	(Morocco)	Wydad Casablanca	0–0	1–3	1–3	
2008	CAF Champions League	PR	(Angola)	Primeiro de Agosto	1–2	0–0	1–2	
2009	CAF Confederation Cup	R1	(Tunisia)	Stade Tunisien	2–0	0–0	2–0	
2009	CAF Confederation Cup	1R16	(Algeria)	JSM Béjaïa	1–0	0–1	1–1 (13–12 p)	
2009	CAF Confederation Cup	2R16	(Morocco)	Ittihad Khemisset	3–1	1–1	4–2	
2009	CAF Confederation Cup	GS	(Nigeria)	Bayelsa United	0–1	2–1	1st	
2009	CAF Confederation Cup	GS	(Egypt)	Haras El-Hodood	2–0	1–1	1st	
2009	CAF Confederation Cup	GS	(Angola)	Primeiro de Agosto	0–0	0–0	1st	
2009	CAF Confederation Cup	SF	(Egypt)	ENPPI	4–2	2–2	6–4	
2009	CAF Confederation Cup	F	(Algeria)	ES Sétif	2–0	0–2	2–2 (3–2 p)	
2010	CAF Super Cup		(Democratic Republic of the Congo)	TP Mazembe	0–2			
2010	CAF Confederation Cup	R1	(Ivory Coast)	Séwé Sport	2–0	0–2	2–2 (4–3 p)	
2010	CAF Confederation Cup	1R16	(Morocco)	FUS Rabat	0–0	0–2	0–2	
2011	CAF Champions League	R1	(Morocco)	Raja Casablanca	2–1	0–1	2–2 (a)	
2012	CAF Champions League	R1	(Benin)	Tonnerre	5–2	0–0	5–2	
2012	CAF Champions League	R2	(Egypt)	Al Ahly	1–0	1–3	2–3	
2012	CAF Confederation Cup	PL	(Morocco)	COD Meknès	3–0	1–1	4–1	
2012	CAF Confederation Cup	GS	(Mali)	Djoliba	0–2	1–2	4th	
2012	CAF Confederation Cup	GS	(Republic of the Congo)	AC Léopards	1–1	0–1	4th	
2012	CAF Confederation Cup	GS	(Morocco)	Wydad Casablanca	3–3	1–1	4th	
2013	CAF Champions League	R1	(Senegal)	Casa Sports	2–0	2–1	4–1	
2013	CAF Champions League	R2	(Cameroon)	Coton Sport	0–0	0–3	0–3	
2013	CAF Confederation Cup	PL	(Burundi)	LLB Académic	5–0	1–0	4–1	
2013	CAF Confederation Cup	GS	(Tunisia)	CS Sfaxien	1–2	0–0	2nd	
2013	CAF Confederation Cup	GS	(Tunisia)	Étoile du Sahel	0–0	1–0	2nd	
2013	CAF Confederation Cup	GS	(Ethiopia)	Saint George	1–0	0–2	2nd	
2013	CAF Confederation Cup	SF	(Democratic Republic of the Congo)	TP Mazembe	1–2	0–1	1–3	
2014	CAF Champions League	PR	(São Tomé and Príncipe)	Sporting Praia Cruz	5–0	2–3	7–3	
2014	CAF Champions League	R1	(Sudan)	Al-Hilal	0–0	0–2	0–2	
2015	CAF Champions League	PR	(Niger)	AS GNN	0–0	1–1	1–1 (a)	
2015	CAF Champions League	R1	(Gabon)	AS Mangasport	2–1	3–1	5–2	
2015	CAF Champions League	R2	(Democratic Republic of the Congo)	TP Mazembe	2–2	1–2	3–4	
2016	CAF Champions League	PR	(Burkina Faso)	RC Bobo-Dioulasso	3–1	1–0	4–1	
2016	CAF Champions League	R1	(Cameroon)	Cotonsport Garoua	2–0	0–1	2–1	
2016	CAF Champions League	R2	(Zambia)	ZESCO United	1–3	1–2	2–5	
2016	CAF Confederation Cup	PL	(Morocco)	FUS Rabat	0–0	0–4	0–4	
2017	CAF Champions League	R1	(Liberia)	Barrack Young Controllers FC	1–0	0–1	1–1 (6–7 p)	
2018	CAF Champions League	PR	(Ivory Coast)	Williamsville AC	1–1	0–1	1–2	
2018–19	CAF Champions League	PR	(Central African Republic)	Stade Centrafricaine	1–0	4–0	5–0	
2018–19	CAF Champions League	1R	(Ivory Coast)	ASEC Mimosas	0–1	0–1	0–2	
2018–19	CAF Confederation Cup	PO	(Angola)	Petro de Luanda	1–1	1–2	2–3	
2019–20	CAF Champions League	PR	(Guinea)	Horoya AC	1–1	0–1	1–2	
2020–21	CAF Champions League	PR	(Guinea)	Ashanti de Siguiri	2–0 (awd.)	2–1	4–1	
2020–21	CAF Champions League	1R	(Morocco)	Wydad AC	1–0	0–3	1–3	
2020–21	CAF Confederation Cup	PO	(Algeria)	JS Kabylie	2–1	0–1	2–2(a)	

^{1} Invincible Eleven were ejected from the competition for fielding an ineligible player.
^{2} AS Douanes were ejected from the competition for fielding an ineligible player.

=== National level ===
Season	Tier	Pos.	Pl.	W	D	L	GS	GA	GD	P	Cup	Notes
2007–08	1	2	26	17	4	5	37	9	+28	55		
2008–09	1	3	26	14	6	6	35	17	+18	48	Finalist	
2009–10	1	1	26	20	2	4	48	17	+31	62		
2010–11	1	1	26	18	5	3	46	12	+34	59	Finalist	
2012–13	1	1	30	25	4	1	56	14	+42	79	Winner	

== Statistics ==
- Best position: Finalist (Continental)
- Best position at a cup competition: 1st, Champions (Continental)
- Highest number of points in a season: 79, in 2013

== Current squad ==
As of 14 November 2021

Note: Flags indicate national team as defined under FIFA eligibility rules; some limited exceptions apply. Players may hold more than one non-FIFA nationality.

No.	Pos.	Nation	Player
1	GK	MLI	Mohamed Niare
2	DF	MLI	Ismaila Simpara
3	DF	MLI	Oumar Koné
4	DF	MLI	Babou Fofana
5	DF	MLI	Yacouba Doumbia
6	DF	MLI	Adama Diawara
7	FW	MLI	Moussa Koné
8	MF	MLI	Sekou Konaté
10	FW	MLI	Mamadou Coulibaly
11	FW	MLI	Moussakoye Diallo
12	MF	MLI	Aly Desse Sissoko
13	MF	MLI	Mahamadou Mady Fofana
14	DF	CIV	Seyo Yao
15	DF	MLI	Mamadou Doumbia

No.	Pos.	Nation	Player
16	GK	MLI	Soumbeïla Diakité
17	MF	IRN	Saeid Tajmiri
18	MF	MLI	Sadio Kanouté
19	MF	MLI	Cheick Keita
21	MF	MLI	Mahamadou Diakite
22	FW	MLI	Mamadou Diakité
23	MF	MLI	Bana Diawara
24	FW	MLI	Abdramane Traoré
25	FW	MLI	Bakary Samake
26	MF	MLI	Moussa Diakité
27	MF	MLI	Modibo Camara
29	MF	MLI	Youssouf Togola
30	GK	MLI	Drissa Kouyaté

== Managers ==
Name	Nationality	From	To
Oumar Sy	Mali	1960s	
Modibo Diawara	Mali	1990's	
Karim Abdul Razak	Ghana	late 2000	November 2002
Mohammed Ahmed Polo	Ghana	November 2002	May 2003
Cheikh Fantamady Diallo (Interim)	Mali	2003	
Christian Zermatten	Switzerland	2003	February 2004
Karim Abdul Razak	Ghana	4 February 2004	December 2006
Mohamed Magassouba	Mali	2007, 14 matches	
Cheikh Fantamady Diallo	Mali	2007	5 May 2008
Cheick Oumar Koné	Mali	26 June 2008	February 2009
Yatouma Diop	Mali	February, 2009	12 February 2009 (Interim)
Djibril Dramé	Mali	12 February 2009	November 2010
Kamel Djabour	France; Algeria	24 November 2010	3 September 2011
Karim Abdul Razak	Ghana	9 September 2011	29 May 2012
Cheikh Fantamady Diallo	Mali	29 May 2012	August 2012
Emmanuel Souloy	France	August 2012	November 2012
Pascal Janin	France	November 2012	Unknown

== Notable players ==
- (Togo) Ouro-Nimini Tchagnirou

== Basketball club ==
As with many West African clubs, Stade Malien fields teams in a number of sports, most notably their successful Men's and Women's Basketball teams. Stade Malien men play in Division 1 in the 2008 season. Historically, they have been Mali League Champion in 2003 and 2004 and were Mali Cup Finalist in 2003.

== Other sports ==
Stade Malien de Bamako is an "Omnisports" club: as well as Football and Basketball, Stade Malien currently fields Athletics and Rugby teams, although the Rugby team remains unassociated with the National Federation.
