= Al Farouk de Tombouctou =

Malian football club

- Ground: Timbuktu, Mali
- League: Malien Premiere Division
Home colours

Al Farouk de Tombouctou is a football and basketball club based in the Malian city of Timbuktu.

== Football ==
Al Farouk were promoted for the first time to the Malian Premiere Division in September 2008, after winning the Division 2, group A tournament, based in their home city of Timbuktu. They had never previously played in the nation's top division, although they competed in the promotion championship in the 2003–2006 seasons.

=== Achievements ===
- Malien second division: Group A champions (2008)

== Basketball ==
Al Farouk has also fielded successful men's and women's basketball teams, with their men's team being invited to the Top Eight Malian championship in 2008.
