= Jeanne d'Arc FC =

Malian football club

- Full name: Jeanne d'Arc FC de Bamako
- Founded: 2007
- Ground: Stade Municipal de Bamako
- Capacity: 5,000
- Manager: Guéladio Nango
- League: Malien Premiere Division
- 2009–10: 5th
Home colours

Jeanne d'Arc FC is a Malian football club based in Bamako.

== History ==
They will play in the 2008–09 Malian Première Division, the top division in Malian football. They are owned by former supporters of the Bamako club Stade Malien.

=== Creation ===
At the end of the 2006–07 season, a group of Stade supporters broke away to form their own football club, taking the "Jeanne d'Arc" name with them. The name is a reference to one of two defunct clubs which combined to form Stade Malien, Jeanne d'Arc du Soudan (founded 1938) in 1960. In late 2007 this group formed Jeanne d'Arc FC Bamako, which competed in lower division football during the 2007–08 season.

=== Promotion ===
In September 2008, Jeanne d'Arc became champions of the Malian Groupe B league soccer tournament, one of two regional tournaments which promotes teams to the Malien Première Division, and will compete against their former counterparts during the 2008–09 season.

== Achievements ==
- Malian Groupe B League
  - Champions (1): 2008
