= Yatouma Diop =

Malian footballer

Personal information
- Date of birth: 25 September 1972 (age 54)
- Position: Defender

International career
Years	Team	Apps	(Gls)
1993–1996	Mali	14	(1)

Yatouma Diop (born 25 September 1972) is a Malian footballer. He played in 14 matches for the Mali national football team from 1993 to 1996. He was also named in Mali's squad for the 1994 African Cup of Nations tournament.
