= Malian Cup =

Malian Cup Coupe du Mali Orange
- Founded: 1960
- Region: Mali
- Teams: c. 50
- Current champions: Stade Malien (23rd time) (2024)
- Most championships: Stade Malien (23)
- 2025 Malian Cup

The Malian Cup, known as the Coupe du Mali Orange for sponsorship reasons, is the top knockout tournament of the Malian football.

The competition is the only one where some of the clubs who won titles are based outside Bamako, the Malian capital.

== Winners ==
Season	Winner	Score	Runner-up
1961	Stade Malien (Bamako)	3-3; 2-1	Djoliba AC (Bamako)
1962	AS Real (Bamako)	7-1	Sonni AC (Gao)
1963	Stade Malien (Bamako)	6-3	Avenir (Ségou)
1964	AS Real (Bamako)	4-3	Djoliba AC (Bamako)
1965	Djoliba AC (Bamako)	5-1	Kayésienne
1966	AS Real (Bamako)	0-0; 2-0	Avenir (Ségou)
1967	AS Real (Bamako)	4-1	US Sevaré
1968	AS Real (Bamako)	1-0	Stade Malien (Bamako)
1969	AS Real (Bamako)	8-2	Africa Sports (Gao)
1970	Stade Malien (Bamako)	10-0	Kayésienne
1971	Djoliba AC (Bamako)	4-0	Jeunesse Sportive (Ségou)
1972	Stade Malien (Bamako)	5-1	Avenir (Ségou)
1973	Djoliba AC (Bamako)	1-1; 1-0	AS Real (Bamako)
1974	Djoliba AC (Bamako)	2-0	Cercle Olympique (Bamako)
1975	Djoliba AC (Bamako)	1-1; 1-0	Stade Malien (Bamako)
1976	Djoliba AC (Bamako)	0-0; 3-0	Avenir (Ségou)
1977	Djoliba AC (Bamako)	6-1	Tibo Club (Mopti)
1978	Djoliba AC (Bamako)	1-1; 2-1	AS Real (Bamako)
1979	Djoliba AC (Bamako)	3-1	Stade Malien (Bamako)
1980	AS Real (Bamako)	1-0	Djoliba AC (Bamako)
1981	Djoliba AC (Bamako)	1-0	AS Real (Bamako)
1982	Stade Malien (Bamako)	4-2	AS Biton (Ségou)
1983	Djoliba AC (Bamako)	1-0	Stade Malien (Bamako)
1984	Stade Malien (Bamako)	3-1	Djoliba AC (Bamako)
1985	Stade Malien (Bamako)	4-2	Djoliba AC (Bamako)
1986	Stade Malien (Bamako)	1-1; 2-1	Djoliba AC (Bamako)
1987	AS Sigui (Kayès)	2-1	AS Real (Bamako)
1988	Stade Malien (Bamako)	3-1	Djoliba AC (Bamako)
1989	AS Real (Bamako)	2-0	Djoliba AC (Bamako)
1990	Stade Malien (Bamako)	1-0	Djoliba AC (Bamako)
1991	AS Real (Bamako)	2-1	AS Mandé (Bamako)
1992	Stade Malien (Bamako)	1-1; 1-0	AS Real (Bamako)
1993	Djoliba AC (Bamako)	4-0	USFAS Bamako
1994	Stade Malien (Bamako)	2-0 (aet)	AS Nianan (Koulikoro)
1995	Stade Malien (Bamako)	1-0	USFAS Bamako
1996	Djoliba AC (Bamako)	2-1	AS Real (Bamako)
1997	Stade Malien (Bamako)	2-1	AS Real (Bamako)
1998	Djoliba AC (Bamako)	1-0 (aet)	Stade Malien (Bamako)
1999	Stade Malien (Bamako)	1-0	AS Nianan (Koulikoro)
2000	Cercle Olympique (Bamako)	1-0	Stade Malien (Bamako)
2001	Stade Malien (Bamako)	5-0	Mamahira AC (Kati)
2002	Cercle Olympique (Bamako)	2-1	Stade Malien (Bamako)
2003	Djoliba AC (Bamako)	2-1 (aet)	AS Tata National (Sikasso)
2004	Djoliba AC (Bamako)	2-0	AS Nianan (Koulikoro)
2005	AS Bamako	1-1 (5-4 aet)	Djoliba AC (Bamako)
2006	Stade Malien (Bamako)	2-1	AS Bamako
2007	Djoliba AC (Bamako)	2-0	AS Bakaridjan de Barouéli
2008	Djoliba AC (Bamako)	2-0	Cercle Olympique (Bamako)
2009	Djoliba AC (Bamako)	1-0	Stade Malien
2010	AS Real (Bamako)	2-1	Centre Salif Keita
2011	Cercle Olympique (Bamako)	2-1 (aet)	Stade Malien (Bamako)
2012	US Bougouni (Bougouni)	2-1	Onze Créateurs de Niaréla (Bamako)
2013	Stade Malien (Bamako)	1-0	Djoliba AC (Bamako)
2014	Onze Créateurs de Niaréla (Bamako)	1-0	Djoliba AC (Bamako)
2015	Stade Malien (Bamako)	2-1	Onze Créateurs de Niaréla
2016	AS Onze Créateurs (Bamako)	0-0 (7-6 p)	USFAS Bamako (Bamako)
2017	not finished; final between Stade Malien and Djoliba AC not played (may be played in 2018)		
2018	Stade Malien (Bamako)	2-1	Djoliba AC (Bamako)
2019	Not held		
2020	Abandoned		
2021	Stade Malien (Bamako)	3-2	Binga FC (Bamako)
2022	Djoliba AC (Bamako)	2-0	AS Real (Bamako)
2023	Stade Malien (Bamako)	1-0	Onze Créateurs de Niaréla
2024	Stade Malien (Bamako)	4-0	Afrique Football Élite
