= AS Nianan =

Malian football club

- Full name: Association Sportive Nianan
- Founded: 1979
- Ground: Stade Municipal de Koulikoro; Koulikoro, Mali
- Capacity: 8,000
- League: Malien Première Division
- 2013–14: 13th
Away colours

AS Nianan is a Malian football club based in Koulikoro. They play in the top division in Malian football. Their home stadium is Stade Municipal de Koulikoro. The club was founded in 1979 as a merger of three clubs from Koulikoro: Meguétan, Soundiata FC and Société Sportive de Koulikoro (SSK). They last played in the Malien Première Division in the 2007–08 season, at the end of which they were relegated.

Cheick Oumar Koné played for and coached the club from 1984 to 2000, apart from 1987/88, when he played for AS Real Bamako.

== Performance in CAF competitions ==
- CAF Confederation Cup: 1 appearance

2005 – Preliminary Round

- CAF Cup: 1 appearance

1994 – Second Round

- CAF Cup Winners' Cup: 1 appearance

1995 – Second Round
