= Stade Malien de Sikasso =

Malian football club

- Full name: AS Stade Malien de Sikasso
- Ground: Sikasso, Mali
- League: Malien Premiere Division
Home colours	Away colours

Stade Malien de Sikasso is a Malian football club. The team is based in the city of Sikasso.
