= Stade Municipal de USFAS =

Football stadium in Bamako, Mali

Stade Municipal de USFAS is a stadium in Bamako, Mali. It is used mostly for football and serves as the home stadium of USFAS Bamako. The stadium has a capacity of 5,000 people.
