= 2016 Malian Première Division =

Malian Première Division
- Season: 2016
- Champions: Stade Malien

The 2016 Malian Première Division was the 51st edition of the highest club level football competition in Mali. It started on 12 March and concluded on 2 October 2016.

== First round ==
=== Poule A ===
Pos	Team	Pld	W	D	L	GF	GA	GD	Pts	Qualification or relegation
1	Stade Malien (Bamako)	16	10	5	1	24	8	+16	35	Qualified
2	Onze Créateurs de Niaréla (Bamako)	16	9	4	3	19	12	+7	31	Qualified
3	Cercle Olympique Bamako	16	8	3	5	22	14	+8	27	
4	Lafia Club de Bamako	16	7	3	6	17	15	+2	24	
5	CS Duguwolofila de Babanba (Koulikoro)	16	5	5	6	19	17	+2	20	
6	AS Olympique de Messira (Bamako)	16	5	3	8	9	12	−3	18	
7	AS Nianan de Koulikoro	16	5	3	8	11	21	−10	18	
8	US Bougouni	16	5	2	9	13	19	−6	17	
9	AS Sabana (Mopti)	16	2	4	10	10	26	−16	10	Relegated

- AC Tombouctou were excluded

=== Poule B ===
Pos	Team	Pld	W	D	L	GF	GA	GD	Pts	Qualification or relegation
1	AS Réal (Bamako)	18	11	3	4	32	14	+18	36	Qualified
2	Djoliba Athlétic Club (Bamako)	18	9	7	2	30	11	+19	34	Qualified
3	AS Bamako	18	8	5	5	15	13	+2	29	
4	USFAS (Bamako)	18	7	3	8	20	20	0	24	
5	AS Bakaridjan de Barouéli (Ségou)	18	7	3	8	14	22	−8	24	
6	USC Kita	18	5	8	5	15	13	+2	23	
7	JS Centre Salif Kéïta (Bamako)	18	6	3	9	16	30	−14	21	
8	Mamahira AC de Kati (Koulikoro)	18	5	5	8	16	14	+2	20	
9	AS Police (Bamako)	18	4	6	8	11	19	−8	18	Relegated
10	Débo Club (Mopti)	18	4	5	9	16	29	−13	17	Relegated

== Final round ==
Pos	Team	Pld	W	D	L	GF	GA	GD	Pts	Result
1	Stade Malien (Bamako)	6	4	2	0	6	1	+5	14	Champions
2	AS Réal (Bamako)	6	2	1	3	3	4	−1	7	
3	Djoliba Athlétic Club (Bamako)	6	1	3	2	3	4	−1	6	
4	Onze Créateurs de Niaréla (Bamako)	6	1	2	3	2	5	−3	5	
