= US Bougouni =

Malian football club

US Bougouni is a Malian football club. The team is based in the city of Bougouni.

They are the first second-division team to win the Malian Cup.

== Achievements ==
- Malien Cup: 1

2012

== Performance in CAF competitions ==
- CAF Confederation Cup: 1 appearance

2013 –
