= Malian Première Division =

Ligue 1 Orange Mali
- Founded: 1966; 60 years ago
- Country: Mali
- Confederation: CAF
- Number of clubs: 18
- Level on pyramid: 1
- Domestic cup(s): Malian Cup; Super Coupe National du Mali
- International cup(s): Champions League; Confederation Cup
- Current champions: Djoliba (2025–26)
- Most championships: Djoliba (25)
- Current: 2025–26 Malian Première Division

Malian Première Division (French: Première division malienne) is the top division of football in Mali. Having been created in 1966, it is governed by the Malian Football Federation. The league has been professional since 2004. The official name is Ligue 1 Orange Mali for sponsorship reasons.

The season usually runs from December to late August. The league currently consists of twenty clubs split into two pools and features a round-robin home-and-away schedule within each pool. The top two in each pool qualify for the Championship Play-Off (Carré d'As), which involves a round-robin between the four teams. The winners of the play-off are crowned champions and qualify for the CAF Champions League.

In the 2017 season, the competition started in early January, but in the 6th round, the government dissolved the football association on 9 March and the remaining matches of the round were abandoned. The league did not take place in 2018 but resumed for the 2019–20 season.

== Teams (2021–22) ==
| Team | Location | Stadium | Capacity |
|---|---|---|---|
| Afrique Élite | Bamako | Stade Modibo Kéïta | 35,000 |
| AS Bakaridjan | Ségou | Stade Amari Daou | 30,000 |
| AS Black Stars | Bamako | Stade Modibo Kéïta | 35,000 |
| AS Douanes | Sikasso | Stade Babemba Traoré de Sikasso | 30,000 |
| AS Korofina | Bamako | Stade Modibo Kéïta | 35,000 |
| AS Olympique de Messira | Bamako | Stade du 26 Mars | 50,000 |
| AS Police | Bamako | Stade du 26 Mars | 50,000 |
| AS Real Bamako | Bamako | Stade Modibo Kéïta | 35,000 |
| CO Bamako | Bamako | Stade Modibo Kéïta | 35,000 |
| CS Duguwolofila | Koulikoro | Stade Mamadou Diarra H. de Koulikoro | 8,000 |
| Djoliba AC | Bamako | Stade du 26 Mars | 50,000 |
| LC Bamako | Bamako | Stade Modibo Kéïta | 35,000 |
| Stade Malien | Bamako | Stade du 26 Mars | 50,000 |
| AS Onze Créateurs de Niaréla | Bamako | Stade du 26 Mars | 50,000 |
| US Bougouba | Bougouba | Stade du 26 Mars | 50,000 |
| USC Kita | Kita | Stade du 26 Mars | 50,000 |
| USFAS Bamako | Bamako | Stade Municipal de USFAS | 5,000 |
| Yeelen Olympique | Bamako | Stade du 26 Mars | 50,000 |

== Previous winners ==
| Years | Champions |
|---|---|
| 1966 | Djoliba (1) |
| 1967 | Djoliba (2) |
| 1968 | Djoliba (3) |
| 1969 | Real Bamako (1) |
| 1970 | Stade Malien (1) |
| 1971 | Djoliba (4) |
| 1972 | Stade Malien (2) |
| 1973 | Djoliba (5) |
| 1974 | Djoliba (6) |
| 1975 | Djoliba (7) |
| 1976 | Djoliba (8) |
| 1977–1978 | Not held |
| 1979 | Djoliba (9) |
| 1980 | Real Bamako (2) |
| 1980–81 | Real Bamako (3) |
| 1981–82 | Djoliba (10) |
| 1982–83 | Real Bamako (4) |
| 1983–84 | Stade Malien (3) |
| 1984–85 | Djoliba (11) |
| 1985–86 | Real Bamako (5) |
| 1986–87 | Stade Malien (4) |
| 1987–88 | Djoliba (12) |
| 1988–89 | Stade Malien (5) |
| 1989–90 | Djoliba (13) |
| 1990–91 | Real Bamako (6) |
| 1991–92 | Djoliba (14) |
| 1992–93 | Stade Malien (6) |
| 1993–94 | Stade Malien (7) |
| 1994–95 | Stade Malien (8) |
| 1995–96 | Djoliba (15) |
| 1996–97 | Djoliba (16) |
| 1997–98 | Djoliba (17) |
| 1998–99 | Djoliba(18) |
| 1999–2000 | Stade Malien (9) |
| 2000–01 | Stade Malien (10) |
| 2001–02 | Stade Malien (11) |
| 2002–03 | Stade Malien (12) |
| 2003–04 | Djoliba (19) |
| 2004–05 | Stade Malien (13) |
| 2005–06 | Stade Malien (14) |
| 2006–07 | Stade Malien (15) |
| 2007–08 | Djoliba (20) |
| 2008–09 | Djoliba (21) |
| 2009–10 | Stade Malien (16) |
| 2010–11 | Stade Malien (17) |
| 2011–12 | Djoliba (22) |
| 2012–13 | Stade Malien (18) |
| 2013–14 | Stade Malien (19) |
| 2014–15 | Stade Malien (20) |
| 2016 | Stade Malien (21) |
| 2017 | Abandoned (Note: Stade Malien was top of the table.) |
| 2017–18 | Not held |
| 2018–19 | Not held |
| 2019–20 | Stade Malien (22) |
| 2020–21 | Stade Malien (23) |
| 2021–22 | Djoliba (23) |
| 2022–23 | Real Bamako (7) |
| 2023–24 | Djoliba (24) |
| 2024–25 | Stade Malien (24) |
| 2025–26 | Djoliba (25) |

== Performance by club ==
| Club | Titles | Years |
|---|---|---|
| Djoliba AC | 25 | 1966, 1967, 1968, 1971, 1973, 1974, 1975, 1976, 1979, 1981–82, 1984–85, 1987–88, 1989–90, 1991–92, 1995–96, 1996–97, 1997–98, 1998–99, 2003–04, 2007–08, 2008–09, 2011–12, 2021–22, 2023–24, 2025–26 |
| Stade Malien | 24 | 1970, 1972, 1983–84, 1986–87, 1988–89, 1992–93, 1993–94, 1994–95, 1999–2000, 2000–01, 2001–02, 2002–03, 2004–05, 2005–06, 2006–07, 2009–10, 2010–11, 2012–13, 2013–14, 2014–15, 2016, 2019–20, 2020–21, 2024–25 |
| AS Real Bamako | 7 | 1969, 1980, 1980–81, 1982–83, 1985–86, 1990–91, 2022–23 |

== Qualification for CAF competitions ==
=== Association ranking for the 2025–26 CAF club season ===
The association ranking for the 2025–26 CAF Champions League and the 2025–26 CAF Confederation Cup will be based on results from each CAF club competition from 2020–21 to the 2024–25 season.

Legend

- CL: CAF Champions League
- CC: CAF Confederation Cup
- ≥: Associations points might increase on basis of its clubs performance in 2024–25 CAF club competitions
- Associations ranked 1–12 are eligible to enter two teams in each CAF club competition.

| Rank | | | Association | 2020–21 (× 1) | | 2021–22 (× 2) | | 2022–23 (× 3) | | 2023–24 (× 4) | | 2024–25 (× 5) | | Total |
| 2025 | 2024 | Mvt | Association | CL | CC | CL | CC | CL | CC | CL | CC | CL | CC | Total |
|---|---|---|---|---|---|---|---|---|---|---|---|---|---|---|
| 1 | 1 | — | Egypt | 8 | 3 | 7 | 4 | 8 | 2.5 | 7 | 7 | 10 | 4 | 190.5 |
| 2 | 2 | — | Morocco | 4 | 6 | 9 | 5 | 8 | 2 | 2 | 4 | 5 | 5 | 142 |
| 3 | 4 | +1 | South Africa | 8 | 2 | 5 | 4 | 4 | 3 | 4 | 1.5 | 9 | 3 | 131 |
| 4 | 3 | -1 | Algeria | 6 | 5 | 7 | 1 | 6 | 5 | 2 | 3 | 5 | 5 | 130 |
| 5 | 6 | +1 | Tanzania | 3 | 0.5 | 0 | 2 | 3 | 4 | 6 | 0 | 2 | 4 | 82.5 |
| 6 | 5 | -1 | Tunisia | 4 | 3 | 5 | 1 | 4 | 2 | 6 | 1 | 3 | 0.5 | 82.5 |
| 7 | 8 | +1 | Angola | 1 | 0 | 5 | 0 | 2 | 0 | 3 | 1.5 | 2 | 2 | 55 |
| 8 | 7 | -1 | DR Congo | 4 | 0 | 0 | 3 | 1 | 2 | 4 | 0 | 2 | 0 | 45 |
| 9 | 9 | — | Sudan | 3 | 0 | 3 | 0 | 3 | 0 | 2 | 0 | 3 | 0 | 41 |
| 10 | 11 | +1 | Ivory Coast | 0 | 0 | 0 | 1 | 0 | 3 | 3 | 0 | 1 | 2 | 38 |
| 11 | 10 | -1 | Libya | 0 | 0.5 | 0 | 5 | 0 | 0.5 | 0 | 3 | 0 | 0 | 24 |
| 12 | 12 | — | Nigeria | 0 | 2 | 0 | 0 | 0 | 2 | 0 | 2 | 0 | 1 | 21 |
| 13 | 15 | +2 | Mali | 0 | 0 | 0 | 0 | 0 | 1 | 0 | 2 | 1 | 0.5 | 18.5 |
| 14 | 14 | — | Ghana | 0 | 0 | 0 | 0 | 0 | 0 | 1 | 3 | 0 | 0 | 16 |
| 15 | 13 | -2 | Guinea | 2 | 0 | 1 | 0 | 2 | 0 | 0 | 0.5 | 0 | 0 | 12 |
| 16 | 19 | +3 | Botswana | 0 | 0 | 1 | 0 | 0 | 0 | 1 | 0 | 0 | 0.5 | 8.5 |
| 17 | 21 | +4 | Senegal | 1 | 2 | 0 | 0 | 0 | 0 | 0 | 0 | 0 | 1 | 8 |
| 18 | 17 | -1 | Mauritania | 0 | 0 | 0 | 0 | 0 | 0 | 2 | 0 | 0 | 0 | 8 |
| 19 | 18 | -1 | Congo | 0 | 0 | 0 | 1 | 0 | 1 | 0 | 0.5 | 0 | 0 | 7 |
| 20 | 16 | -4 | Cameroon | 0 | 3 | 0 | 0.5 | 1 | 0 | 0 | 0 | 0 | 0 | 7 |
| 21 | 22 | +1 | Togo | 0 | 0 | 0 | 0 | 0 | 1 | 0 | 0 | 0 | 0 | 3 |
| 22 | 22 | — | Uganda | 0 | 0 | 0 | 0 | 1 | 0 | 0 | 0 | 0 | 0 | 3 |
| 23 | - | new | Mozambique | 0 | 0 | 0 | 0 | 0 | 0 | 0 | 0 | 0 | 0.5 | 2.5 |
| 24 | 20 | -4 | Zambia | 0 | 1.5 | 0 | 0.5 | 0 | 0 | 0 | 0 | 0 | 0 | 2.5 |
| 25 | 24 | -1 | Eswatini | 0 | 0 | 0 | 0.5 | 0 | 0 | 0 | 0 | 0 | 0 | 1 |
| 25 | 24 | -1 | Niger | 0 | 0 | 0 | 0.5 | 0 | 0 | 0 | 0 | 0 | 0 | 1 |
| 27 | 26 | -1 | Burkina Faso | 0 | 0.5 | 0 | 0 | 0 | 0 | 0 | 0 | 0 | 0 | 0.5 |

== Top goalscorers ==
| Season | Player | Club | Goals |
|---|---|---|---|
| 1998–99 | (Mali) Soumaila Toure | USFAS Bamako | 12 |
| 2000–01 | (Mali) Mamadou Kanté | Stade Malien | 23 |
| 2002 | (Mali) Soungalo Diakite | Stade Malien | 25 |
| 2002–03 | (Mali) Ousmane Coulibaly | Nianan | 13 |
| 2004 | (Mali) Mintou Doucouré | Centre Salif Keita | 14 |
| 2005 | (Ivory Coast) Jacques Koffi N'Guessan | Real Bamako | 18 |
| 2007 | (Mali) Bakary Coulibaly | Stade Malien | 16 |
| 2008–09 | (Mali) Ousmane Ben Goïta | USFAS Bamako | 13 |
| 2008–09 | (Mali) Mamadou Coulibaly | Stade Malien | 13 |
| 2021–22 | (Mali) Moussa Koné | Bougouba | 20 |
| 2023–24 | (Mali) Lamine Diakite | Onze Createurs | 15 |
| 2025–26 | (Mali) Ibrahim Doumbia | ASKO | 16 |
