= AS Bamako =

Association football club in Mali

- Full name: Association Sportive de Bamako
- Nickname(s): ASB
- Founded: 1999; 26 years ago
- Ground: Stade Municipal de Bamako; Bamako, Mali
- Capacity: 5,000
- League: Malien Premiere Division
- 2013–14: 9th
Home colours

AS Bamako is a Malian football club based in Bamako. They play in the top division in Malian football. Their home stadium is Stade Municipal de Bamako.

== Achievements ==
- Malien Cup: 1

2005

== Performance in CAF competitions ==
- CAF Confederation Cup: 2 appearances

2006 – Second Round
2007 – Preliminary Round

== Squad ==
Note: Flags indicate national team as defined under FIFA eligibility rules; some limited exceptions apply. Players may hold more than one non-FIFA nationality.

No.	Pos.	Nation	Player
1	GK	(Mali) MLI	Boubacar Keita
9	FW	(Mali) MLI	Gaoussou Diallo

No.	Pos.	Nation	Player
11	FW	(Guinea-Bissau) GNB	Agostinho Toni Soares
18	FW	(Mali) MLI	Baboucar Sissoko
