= Modibo Kéïta Stadium =

Football stadium in Mali

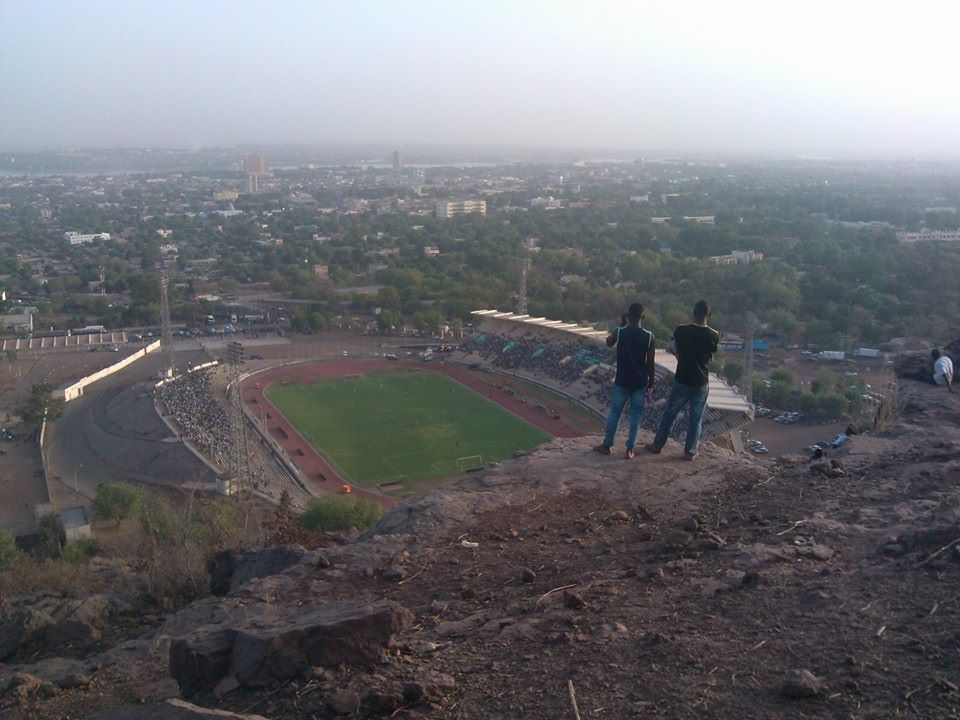
- Interactive map of Modibo Kéïta Stadium
- Former names: Stade Omnisports de Bamako
- Location: Bamako, Mali
- Coordinates: 12°39′35″N 7°59′35″W
- Capacity: 35,000
- Surface: Grass

Construction
- Built: 12 June 1963
- Opened: 2 December 1967
- Renovated: 2025–present
- Builder: Sovieto-Malian Cooperation

Tenants
- Mali national football team AS Korofina; AS Real Bamako

Modibo Kéïta Stadium is a multi-purpose stadium in Bamako, Mali. It is currently used mostly for football matches, serving as a home ground for AS Real Bamako and, occasionally, the national team. The stadium holds 35,000 people and is named after President Modibo Keïta.

A beautiful cliff overlooks the stadium

== History ==
The construction of the stadium started on 12 June 1963 by a Soviet-Malian cooperation under the order of the president Modibo Keïta. It was opened on 2 December 1967. The stadium change the name to Modibo Keïta Stadium on 4 July 1987.

== 2002 African Cup of Nations ==
The stadium played host to a total of seven matches during the 2002 African Cup of Nations. It was the primary venue for Group D, hosting five of the six matches from the group, as well as one quarterfinal game and one semifinal game.

Senegal, Egypt, Tunisia, and Zambia made up Group D and Stade Modibo Keïta saw a variety of attendance for the matches between these sides. Only 3,000 were on hand for the Egypt - Tunisia match on January 25, half as many as the January 21 encounter between Zambia and Tunisia which saw 6,000 in attendance. However, fans flocked to the stadium when neighbors Senegal played. 20,000 turned up for the opening match of the group on January 20 between Senegal and Egypt and attendance hit 20,000 again for the Senegal - Zambia match on January 26. 10,000 witnessed the final group game between Egypt and Zambia on January 31.

In the quarterfinals, the stadium was filled to capacity as Senegal defeat Congo DR. Three days later, Senegal returned in the semifinals to defeat Nigeria 2–1 in extra time in front of 20,000.

Date	Team #1	Result	Team #2	Round	Spectators
20/01/02	Senegal	1 – 0	Egypt	Group D	20,000
21/01/02	Zambia	0 – 0	Tunisia	Group D	6,000
25/01/02	Egypt	1 – 0	Tunisia	Group D	3,000
26/01/02	Senegal	1 – 0	Zambia	Group D	20,000
31/01/02	Egypt	2 – 1	Zambia	Group D	10,000
04/02/02	Senegal	2 – 0	DR Congo	Quarterfinals	25,000
07/02/02	Senegal	2 – 1 aet	Nigeria	Semifinals	20,000

== February 2011 Stampede ==
On 21 February 2011, 36 people were killed and more than 60 were injured in a stampede at the stadium, as people attempted to receive a blessing from the imam Osman Madani Haidara during the festival of Maouloud.
