= AS Korofina =

Malian football club

- Full name: Association Sportive Korofina
- Nickname: ASKO
- Ground: Stade Modibo Keïta; Bamako, Mali
- Capacity: 35,000
- Chairman: Makan Keïta
- Manager: Baye Bah
- League: Malien Premiere Division
- 2025–26: 7th
Home colours	Away colours

AS Korofina is a Malian football club. The team is based in the city of Bamako, in the Commune I neighborhood. Their home ground is Stade Modibo Keïta. They are also known by the acronym ASKO.

== History ==
ASKO were promoted to the Malien Premiere Division for the first time at the beginning of the 2006 season, finishing that season in 5th place. They finished 8th in 2007, led by Mali international goalkeeper Ibrahim Bosso Mounkoro.

At the beginning of the 2008–2009 season, club president Makan Keïta announce the team would change their traditional colours, opting for an all orange kit in place of their traditional sky blue and white stripes.

== Achievements ==
- Malien Premiere Division:

- Malien Cup:

- Mali SuperCup:
