= 26 March Stadium =

Football stadium in Bamako, Mali

- Location within Mali
- Full name: Stade du 26 mars
- Location: RN6 (Route Nationale 6); Bamako, Mali
- Coordinates: 12°36′16″N 7°55′18″W
- Owner: Malian Government
- Capacity: 50,000
- Surface: Grass

Construction
- Opened: 31 December 2001
- Cost: 30 million Euros
- Main contractor: China Overseas Engineering Group

Tenants
- Mali national football team AS Onze Créateurs de Niaréla; AS Police de Bamako; CO Bamako; Djoliba AC; Stade Malien; USC Kita; Elewidj FC

26 March Stadium is located in the southern neighborhoods of Bamako, Mali. It serves as a home ground for domestic football club Stade Malien and is the national stadium. It has a capacity of 50,000 as an all-seater stadium. Built in 2001, it is named for the date of Martyrs' Day, a national commemoration of 26 March 1991 Bamako uprising which overthrew the dictatorship of Moussa Traoré. The stadium, which is built by China Overseas Engineering Group, served as a venue for 2002 African Cup of Nations.

Preceded by National Stadium; Lagos	African Cup of Nations; Final Venue; 2002	Succeeded by Stade 7 November; Rades
