= CS Duguwolofila =

Malian football club

- Full name: Club Sportive Duguwolofila de Koulikoro
- Ground: Stade Mamadou Diarra H. de Koulikoro; Koulikoro, Mali
- Capacity: 8,000
- League: Malien Première Division
- 2013–14: 4th
Home colours

Club Sportive Duguwolofila de Koulikoro is a Malian football club. The team is based in the city of Koulikoro.

== Squad ==
Note: Flags indicate national team as defined under FIFA eligibility rules; some limited exceptions apply. Players may hold more than one non-FIFA nationality.

No.	Pos.	Nation	Player
2	DF	(Mali) MLI	Mahamane Mariko
7	MF	(Mali) MLI	Adama Coulibaly
