= AS Police de Bamako =

Malian football club

AS Police
- Full name: AS Police de Bamako
- Ground: Stade du 26 Mars; Bamako, Mali
- Capacity: 50,000
- League: Malien Première Division
- 2024–25: 9th
Home colours

AS Police is a Malian football club based in Bamako. They play in the Malien Première Division, the top division in Malian football.

== League participations ==
- Malien Première Division: 2009–
- Malien Second Division:

== Stadium ==
Currently, the team plays at the 55,000 capacity Stade du 26 Mars.
