= Koulikoro =

- Commune and town
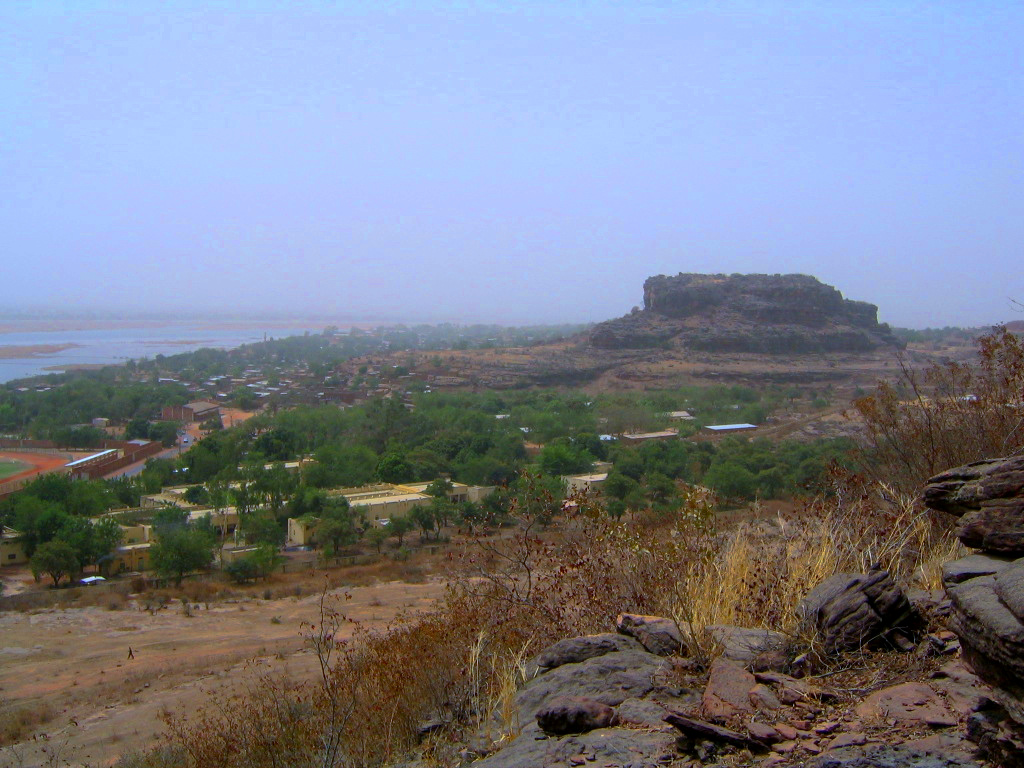
- View over Koulikoro

- Location within Mali
- Coordinates: 12°51′40″N 7°33′30″W
- Country: Mali
- Region: Koulikoro
- Cercle: Koulikoro Cercle
- Urban Commune: Koulikoro

Population (2023)
  - Total: 70,209
- Time zone: UTC+0 (GMT)

Koulikoro (Bambara: ߞߎ߬ߟߌ߬ߞߙߐ߫ tr. Kulikoro) is a town and urban commune in Mali. The capital of the Koulikoro Region, Koulikoro is located on banks of the Niger River, 59 kilometres (37 mi) downstream from Mali's capital Bamako.

Koulikoro is the terminus of the Dakar-Niger Railway which was completed in 1904. Between August and November, at the end of the rainy season, goods are transported down the Niger River to Ségou, Mopti, Tombouctou and Gao. Navigation is not possible upstream of Koulikoro because of the Sotuba Rapids near Bamako.

Koulikoro is also the location of a prison. The Koulikoro prison is noteworthy for housing a number of former Rwandan officers found guilty of having taken part in the Rwandan genocide.

== Gallery ==
Historical images of Koulikoro

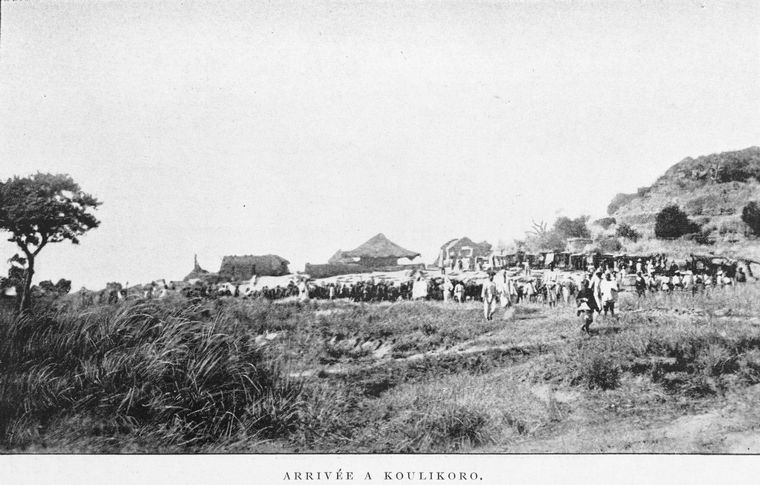
Arrival of the Hourst mission, 1898.

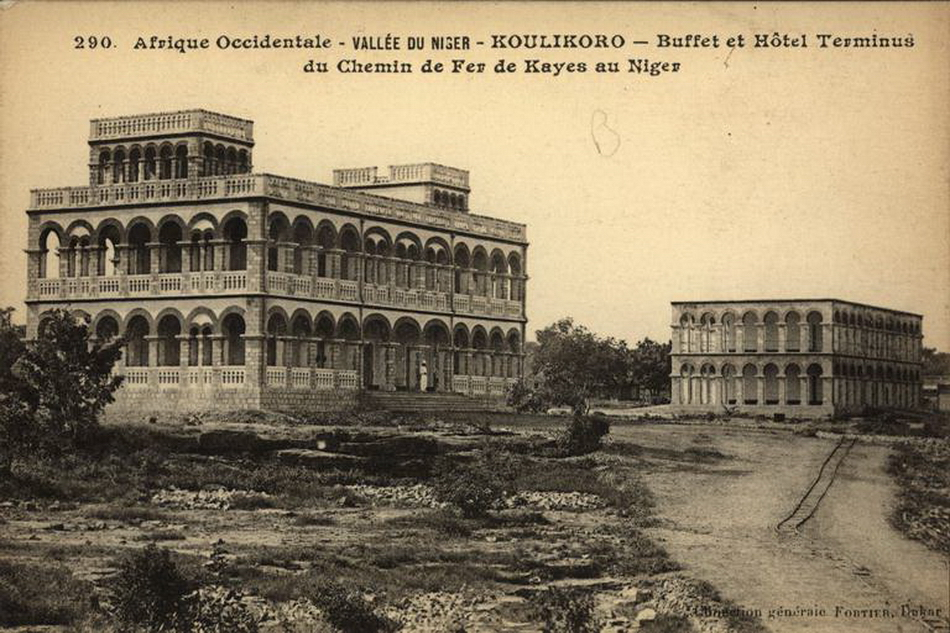
Hotel

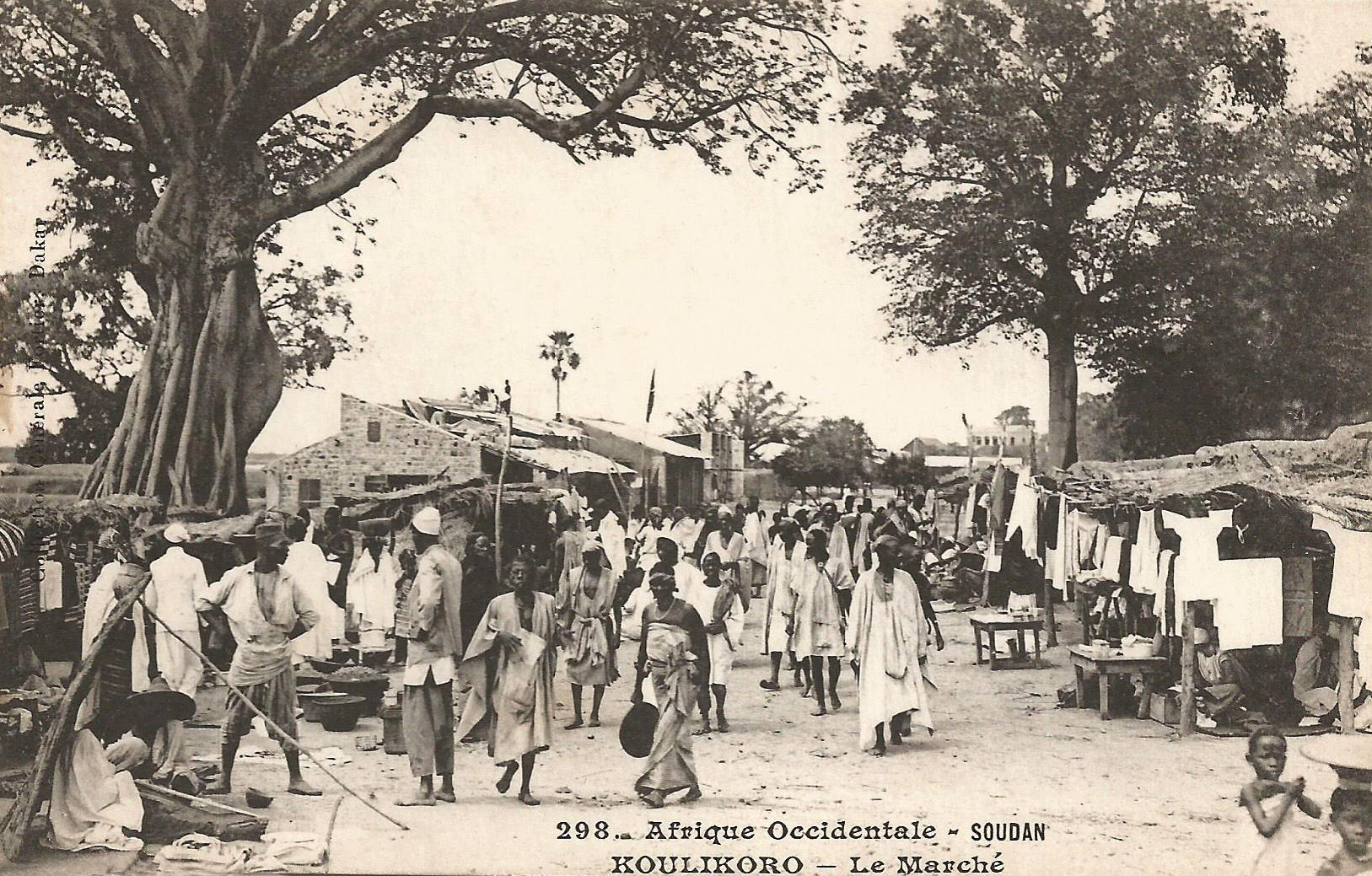
The town's market.

== Sister cities ==
- Bous, Germany
- Quétigny, France
