= JS Centre Salif Keita =

Malian football club

- Full name: Jeunesse Sportive Centre Setif Keita
- Nickname(s): CSK
- Founded: 1995
- Ground: Stade Centre Salif Keita; Bamako, Mali
- Capacity: 4,000
- Manager: Adama Keïta
- League: Malian Première Division
- 2013–14: 10th
Home colours

Jeunesse Sportive Centre Salif Keita (JS CSK) is a Malian professional football club based in Bamako.

== History ==
Founded in 1995, former players include Mahamadou Diarra, Cheick Diabaté and Seydou Keita. The club was founded by Malian football legend Salif Keita as a training centre for young Malian football players.

Playing in the top division in Malian football its home stadium is Stade Centre Salif Keita. The team's colours are blue and yellow.

== Performance in CAF competitions ==
- CAF Confederation Cup: 1 appearance

2011 – Preliminary Round

- CAF Cup: 1 appearance

1999 – First Round
