= AS Bakaridjan =

Football club in Mali

- Full name: Association Sportive Bakaridjan de Barouéli
- Nickname: ASB
- Founded: 1989
- Ground: Stade Amary Daou; Ségou, Mali
- Capacity: 30,000
- Chairman: Amadou kouma
- Manager: Lassana kouma
- League: Malien Premiere Division
- 2025–26: 10th
Home colours	Away colours

Association Sportive Bakaridjan de Barouéli is a Malian football club. The team is based in the city of Barouéli, Segou Region. Founded 23 May 1989, their colors are Red and Green, and their slogan is, "Travail – Discipline-Unité".

== Achievements ==
- Malien Cup: 0

2002–03 : Eliminated in group of sixteen by Renaissance AC of Ségou (1–0)
2003–04 : Eliminated in group of eight by Djoliba AC of Bamako (2–1)
2004–05 : Eliminated in group of eight by Débo Club de Mopti of Mopti (2–1)
2005–06 : Eliminated in Quarter-finals by JS Centre Salif Keita of Bamako (2–1)
2006–07 : Finalists in 47th cup by Djoliba AC of Bamako (2–0)

- Malian Première Division: 0

2004–05 : Promoted from D1
2005–06 : 12th in Première Division
2006–07 : 8th in Première Division
2007–08 : 4th in Première Division after 6 rounds with 11 points

- Mali Super Cup:

== Squad ==
Note: Flags indicate national team as defined under FIFA eligibility rules; some limited exceptions apply. Players may hold more than one non-FIFA nationality.

No.	Pos.	Nation	Player
—	MF		
