= CO Bamako =

Association football club in Mali

- Full name: Club Olympique de Bamako
- Founded: 1960
- Ground: Stade 26 Mars; Bamako, Mali
- Capacity: 50,000
- Chairman: Moussa Konaté
- Manager: Sékou Seck
- League: Ligue Régionale de Football de Bamako, Group B
- 2025–26: 5th of 8th
Away colours

Club Olympique de Bamako or COB is a Malian football club based in Bamako. They play in the Ligue Régionale de Football de Bamako, the second tier of Malian football following relegation from the Malian Première Division in the 2023–24 season. Their home stadium is Stade 26 Mars. As of the 2010 season, the club's president was Moussa Konaté.

== Achievements ==
- Malien Cup:

Winners (3): 2000, 2002, 2011
Runners-up (2): 1974, 2008

- Super Coupe National du Mali

Winners (1): 2011

== Performance in CAF competitions ==
- CAF Confederation Cup: 3 appearances

2010 – First Round
2012 – Play-off round
2014 – First Round

- CAF Cup Winners' Cup: 2 appearances

2001 – First Round
2003 – Second Round

== Crest ==
Former club crest

Current club crest
