= USFAS Bamako =

Malian football club

USFAS
- Full name: Union Sportive des Forces; Armées et Sécurité de Bamako
- Founded: 1965
- Ground: Stade Municipal de USFAS; Bamako, Mali
- Capacity: 5,000
- Manager: Xavier Kaboré
- League: Malien Premiere Division
- 2025–26: 6th
Home colours

USFAS Bamako is a Malian football club based in Bamako. They play in the top division of Malian football and are owned by the Malian Army. Their home stadium is Stade Municipal de USFAS.

== Achievements ==
- Malien Cup
  - Winners (1): 1995

== Performance in CAF competitions ==
- CAF Cup: 2 appearances

1998 – First Round
2000 – First Round

== Current squad ==
Note: Flags indicate national team as defined under FIFA eligibility rules; some limited exceptions apply. Players may hold more than one non-FIFA nationality.

| No. | Pos. | Nation | Player |
|---|---|---|---|
| 1 | GK | MLI | Issiaka Traoré |
| 2 | DF | MLI | Brice Bayala (Captain) |
| 3 | DF | MLI | Martin Kafando |
| 4 | DF | MLI | Ousséni Yéyé |
| 5 | DF | MLI | Saïbou Traoré |
| 7 | MF | MLI | Blaise Yaméogo |
| 8 | MF | MLI | Mikayoul Dramé |
| 9 | FW | MLI | Youssouf Yaméogo |
| 10 | MF | MLI | Désiré Sanou |
| 11 | FW | MLI | Abdoul Aziz Djelbéogo |
| 13 | DF | MLI | Mohamed Mariko |
| 14 | MF | MLI | Ibrahim Diabaté |

| No. | Pos. | Nation | Player |
|---|---|---|---|
| 15 | DF | MLI | Abdou Traoré |
| 16 | GK | MLI | Siaka Coulibaly |
| 17 | DF | MLI | Koman Mady Sidibé |
| 18 | FW | MLI | Boniface Zoundi |
| 20 | FW | MLI | Ousmane Ben Goïta |
| 21 | DF | MLI | Sékou Diawara |
| 22 | MF | MLI | Lassine Koné |
| 23 | DF | MLI | Bakaye Camara |
| 24 | MF | MLI | Boubacar Diarra |
| 26 | FW | MLI | Lassine Berthé |
| 28 | DF | MLI | Abdramane Dramé |
