= AS Real Bamako =

Malian football club

Real Bamako
- Full name: Association Sportive du Real Bamako
- Nicknames: The Scorpions; Le Réal
- Founded: 22 September 1960; 65 years ago
- Ground: Stade Modibo Keïta; Bamako, Mali
- Capacity: 35,000
- League: Malian Première Division
- 2025–26: 3rd of 16
Home colours	Away colours

Association Sportive du Real Bamako, commonly referred to as Real Bamako is a Malian professional football club based in Bamako. They compete in the Malian Première Division, top division of Malian football. Their home stadium is Stade Modibo Keïta.

Among Real Bamako's most successful players was Salif "Domingo" Keïta (1963–67), who went on to win three Championships and the Ballon d'Or Africain (1970) at Saint-Étienne in France.

== Achievements ==
- Malian Première Division: 7

1969, 1980, 1980–81, 1982–83, 1985–86, 1990–91, 2022–23

- Malian Cup: 10

1962, 1964, 1966, 1967, 1968, 1969, 1980, 1989, 1991, 2010

== Performance in CAF competitions ==
- African Cup of Champions Clubs/CAF Champions League: 10 appearances

1966 – Finalist
1970 – Second Round
1981 – First Round
1982 – Quarter-finals
1984 – First Round
1987 – First Round
1992 – First Round
2014 – Second Round
2017 – Preliminary Round
2018 – Preliminary Round

- CAF Confederation Cup: 3 appearances

2011 – Preliminary Round
2012 – Second Round
2014 – Group Stage (Top 8)

- CAF Cup Winners' Cup: 2 appearances

1990 – First Round
1997 – First Round

Real Bamako in CAF competitions
Season	Competition	Qualification method	Round	Opposition	Home	Away	Aggregate
1966	African Cup of Champions Clubs		First Round	(Liberia) Invincible Eleven	6–0	2–3	9–2
1966	African Cup of Champions Clubs		Quarterfinals	(Guinea) Conakry I	2–1	2–3	5–3
1966	African Cup of Champions Clubs		Semifinals	(Cameroon) Oryx Douala	3–2	2–4	7–4
1966	African Cup of Champions Clubs		Final	(Ivory Coast) Stade d'Abidjan	3–1	4–1	4–5
1970	African Cup of Champions Clubs	Malian champions	First Round	(Republic of Upper Volta) AS Fonctionnaires	3–0	2–2	5–2
1970	African Cup of Champions Clubs	Malian champions	Second Round	(Ivory Coast) Stade d'Abidjan	2–3	6–2	4–9
1981	African Cup of Champions Clubs	Malian champions	First Round	(Gabon) USM Nziami	1–0	1–0	1–1 (2–4 p)
1982	African Cup of Champions Clubs	Malian champions	First Round	(Republic of the Congo) Étoile du Congo	1–0	1–1	2–1
1982	African Cup of Champions Clubs	Malian champions	Second Round	(Gabon) USM Nziami	2–0	1–0	2–1
1982	African Cup of Champions Clubs	Malian champions	Quarter Finals	(Zaire) FC Lupopo	3–2	2–0	3–4
1984	African Cup of Champions Clubs	Malian champions	First Round	(Benin) Dragons de l'Ouémé	2–2	2–0	2–4
1987	African Cup of Champions Clubs	Malian champions	First Round	(Nigeria) Leventis United F.C.	0–0	4–0	0–4
1990	African Cup Winners' Cup	Malian Cup winners	First Round	(Ghana) Hearts of Oak	1–2	2–0	1–4
1992	African Cup of Champions Clubs	Malian champions	Preliminary Round	(Mauritania) ASC Police	1–1	1–1	2–2 (5-4p)
1992	African Cup of Champions Clubs	Malian champions	First Round	(Morocco) Wydad AC	2–1	2–0	2–3
1997	African Cup Winners' Cup	Malian Cup winners	First Round	(Morocco) FAR Rabat	1–0	4–1	2–4
2011	CAF Confederation Cup	Malian Cup winners	Preliminary Round	(Mauritania) FC Tevragh-Zeina	0–1	0–0	0–1
2012	CAF Confederation Cup	Malian Première Division third place	First Round	(The Gambia) Gamtel	3–1	1–0	3–2
2012	CAF Confederation Cup	Malian Première Division third place	Second Round	(Morocco) Wydad AC	1–0	3–0	1–3
2014	CAF Champions League	Malian Première Division runners-up	Preliminary Round	(Morocco) FAR Rabat	1–1	2–2	3–3(a)
2014	CAF Champions League	Malian Première Division runners-up	First Round	(Nigeria) Enyimba International F.C.	0–1	1–2	2–2(a)
2014	CAF Champions League	Malian Première Division runners-up	Second Round	(Tunisia) Espérance de Tunis	1–1	3–0	1–4
2014	CAF Confederation Cup	Malian Première Division runners-up	Group Stage	(Republic of the Congo) AC Léopards	1–2	1–2	3rd
2014	CAF Confederation Cup	Malian Première Division runners-up	Group Stage	(Cameroon) Coton Sport	1–1	2–1	3rd
2014	CAF Confederation Cup	Malian Première Division runners-up	Group Stage	(Ivory Coast) ASEC Mimosas	1–1	0–0	3rd
2017	CAF Champions League	Malian Première Division runners-up	Preliminary Round	(Nigeria) Rivers United	0–0	4–0	0–4
2018	CAF Champions League	Malian Première Division runners-up	Preliminary Round	(Nigeria) MFM F.C.	1–1	1–0	1–2
2022–23	CAF Confederation Cup	Malian Cup runners-up	First Round	(Burkina Faso) AS Douanes de Ouagadougou	0–0	0–0	0–0 (3–1p)
2022–23	CAF Confederation Cup	Malian Cup runners-up	Second Round	(Ghana) Hearts of Oak	3–0	1–0	3–1
2022–23	CAF Confederation Cup	Malian Cup runners-up	Play-Off Round	(Eswatini) Royal Leopards	3–1	1–1	4–2
2022–23	CAF Confederation Cup	Malian Cup runners-up	Group Stage	(Tanzania) Young Africans	1–1	2–0	3rd
2022–23	CAF Confederation Cup	Malian Cup runners-up	Group Stage	(Tunisia) Union Sportive Monastirienne	1–1	2–1	3rd
2022–23	CAF Confederation Cup	Malian Cup runners-up	Group Stage	(Democratic Republic of the Congo) TP Mazembe	2–1	3–1	3rd
2023–24	CAF Champions League	Malian Première Division champions	First Round	(Cameroon) Coton Sport	0–0	2–0	2–0
2023–24	CAF Champions League	Malian Première Division champions	Second Round	(Mauritania) FC Nouadhibou	0–3	1–1	1–4

Competition	Matches	W	D	L	GF	GA
African Cup of Champions Clubs / CAF Champions League	42	15	13	14	58	64
CAF Confederation Cup	24	6	9	9	23	26
CAF Cup Winners' Cup	4	1	0	3	3	8
Total	70	22	22	26	84	98

== Notable former players ==
- (Mali) Salif Keïta
- (Mali) Diadie Samassékou
- (Mali) Yves Bissouma
- (Mali) Mohamed Camara
- (Mali) Kévin Zohi
- (Mali) Cheick Doucouré
- (Mali) Moussa Doumbia
- (Mali) Mahamadou Sidibé
- (Mali) Kalilou Traoré
- (Mali) Boubacar Diarra
- (Mali) Ibourahima Sidibé
- (Mali) Boubacar Koné
- (Cameroon) Marc Mboua
- (Mali) Boubacar Koné
- (Mali) Kalifa Coulibaly
