= AS Onze Créateurs de Niaréla =

Malian football club

Onze Créateurs
- Full name: Association Sportive Onze Créateurs de Niaréla
- Ground: Stade 26 Mars; Bamako, Mali
- Capacity: 50,000
- Manager: Modibo Fall
- League: Malien Première Division
- 2025–26: 12th
Home colours

AS Onze Créateurs de Niaréla or simply Onze Créateurs is a Malian football club. The team is based in the city of Bamako.

== Achievements ==
- Malien Cup
  - Winners (2): 2014, 2016
- Super Coupe National du Mali
  - Winners (1): 2016
