= 2012 CAF Confederation Cup qualifying rounds =

- Dates: 17 February – 4 March 2012

The 2012 CAF Confederation Cup qualifying rounds decided the eight teams which played in the group stage.

The schedule for the international football tournament was released in October 2011, and the draw for the first three rounds was held in Cairo on 9 December 2011.

Qualification ties were decided over two legs, with aggregate goals used to determine the winner. If the sides were level on aggregate after the second leg, the away goals rule was applied, and if still level, the tie proceeded directly to a penalty shootout (no extra time was played).

== Preliminary round ==
This was a knock-out stage of the 32 teams that did not receive byes to the first round.

First legs: 17–19 February; Second legs: 2–4 March.

19 February 2012
16:00 UTC+01:00

Dragons (Benin)	1–0	(Burkina Faso) Étoile Filante
Zinaba 67'	Report

Stade Charles de Gaulle, Porto-Novo
Referee: William Agbovi (Ghana)
3 March 2012
14:00 UTC±00:00

Étoile Filante (Burkina Faso)	2–0	(Benin) Dragons
Sanfo 68'; Yédan 76'	Report

Stade du 4-Août, Ouagadougou
Referee: Mehdi Abid-Charef (Algeria)

Étoile Filante won 2–1 on aggregate and advanced to the first round.

Nania (Ghana)	w/o	(Guinea) FC Séquence

FC Séquence advanced to the first round after Nania withdrew.

18 February 2012
15:00 UTC+01:00

Union Douala (Cameroon)	1–0	(Sierra Leone) FC Kallon
Babanda 75'	Report

Stade de la Réunification, Douala
Referee: Mounir Mabrouk (Morocco)
3 March 2012
16:30 UTC±00:00

FC Kallon (Sierra Leone)	2–0	(Cameroon) Union Douala
Kallon 41'; Kamara 46'	Report

National Stadium, Freetown
Referee: Aboubacar Bangoura (Guinea)

FC Kallon won 2–1 on aggregate and advanced to the first round.

18 February 2012
15:00 UTC+02:00

Black Leopards (South Africa)	1–1	(Zimbabwe) Motor Action
Xakane 72'	Report	Moyo 84' (pen.)

Peter Mokaba Stadium, Polokwane
Referee: Bernard Chabala (Zambia)
4 March 2012
15:00 UTC+02:00

Motor Action (Zimbabwe)	0–2	(South Africa) Black Leopards
	Report	Mongalo 43', 49'

Rufaro Stadium, Harare
Referee: Simanga Nhleko (Swaziland)

Black Leopards won 3–1 on aggregate and advanced to the first round.

18 February 2012
16:00 UTC+02:00

Red Arrows (Zambia)	0–0	(Eswatini) Royal Leopards
	Report

Nkoloma Stadium, Lusaka
Referee: Norman Matemera (Zimbabwe)
3 March 2012
16:00 UTC+02:00

Royal Leopards (Eswatini)	1–0	(Zambia) Red Arrows
Steenkamp 61'	Report

Mavuso Sports Centre, Manzini
Referee: Sentso Mohau (Lesotho)

Royal Leopards won 1–0 on aggregate and advanced to the first round.

18 February 2012
15:00 UTC+01:00

AS Mangasport (Gabon)	0–1	(Ethiopia) Saint George SA
	Report	Adane 33'

Stade Henri Sylvoz, Moanda
Referee: Aurelio Leite (São Tomé and Príncipe)
3 March 2012
16:00 UTC+03:00

Saint George SA (Ethiopia)	4–0	(Gabon) AS Mangasport
Adane 10', 12', 89'; Yared 57'	Report

Addis Ababa Stadium, Addis Ababa

Saint George SA won 5–0 on aggregate and advanced to the first round.

18 February 2012
15:30 UTC+02:00

Kiyovu Sports (Rwanda)	1–1	(Tanzania) Simba
Ndayishmiye 12'	Report	Kazimoto 11'

Stade Régional Nyamirambo, Kigali
Referee: Thierry Nkurunziza (Burundi)
4 March 2012
16:00 UTC+03:00

Simba (Tanzania)	2–1	(Rwanda) Kiyovu Sports
Sunzu 19', 32'	Report	Mayanja 79'

Benjamin Mkapa National Stadium, Dar es Salaam
Referee: Wiish Yabarow (Somalia)

Simba won 3–2 on aggregate and advanced to the first round.

18 February 2012
19:00 UTC+02:00

Ferroviário de Maputo (Mozambique)	3–0	(Kenya) Gor Mahia
Baugue 4'; Nzili 59'; Diogo 85'	Report

Estádio do Zimpeto, Maputo
Referee: Kalyoto Ngosi (Malawi)
10 March 2012
16:00 UTC+03:00

Gor Mahia (Kenya)	0–1	(Mozambique) Ferroviário de Maputo
	Report	Pilale 30'

Nyayo National Stadium, Nairobi
Referee: Hubert Andriamiharisoa (Madagascar)

Note: Second leg postponed per request from Ferroviário de Maputo.

Ferroviário de Maputo won 4–0 on aggregate and advanced to the first round.

18 February 2012
15:30 UTC±00:00

Séwé Sports (Ivory Coast)	0–1	(Cameroon) Unisport Bafang
	Report	Nganou 45'

Stade Robert Champroux, Abidjan
Referee: Youssef Essrayri (Tunisia)
3 March 2012
15:00 UTC+01:00

Unisport Bafang (Cameroon)	0–0	(Ivory Coast) Séwé Sports
	Report

Stade de la Réunification, Douala
Referee: Ibrahim Mamane (Niger)

Unisport Bafang won 1–0 on aggregate and advanced to the first round.

19 February 2012
16:30 UTC+01:00

AC Léopards (Republic of the Congo)	2–0	(Central African Republic) AS Tempête Mocaf
Komara 10', 78' (pen.)	Report

Stade Denis Sassou Nguesso, Dolisie
Referee: Achille Madila (Congo DR)
4 March 2012
15:00 UTC+01:00

AS Tempête Mocaf (Central African Republic)	2–2	(Republic of the Congo) AC Léopards
Kelebona 36' (pen.); Grengou 43'	Report	Nyamba 38'; Makita 74'

Barthelemy Boganda Stadium, Bangui
Referee: Adam Cordier (Chad)

AC Léopards won 4–2 on aggregate and advanced to the first round.

19 February 2012
15:00 UTC+02:00

LLB Académic (Burundi)	3–0	(Equatorial Guinea) Atlético Semu
Fiston 65', 67', 81'	Report

Prince Louis Rwagasore Stadium, Bujumbura
3 March 2012
17:00 UTC+01:00

Atlético Semu (Equatorial Guinea)	0–2	(Burundi) LLB Académic
	Report	Fiston (?); Ndihokubwayo (?)

Estadio de Malabo, Malabo

LLB Académic won 5–0 on aggregate and advanced to the first round.

19 February 2012
15:00 UTC+01:00

Renaissance (Chad)	2–0	(Niger) Sahel SC
Arnaud 45+1'; Kazimir 48'	Report

Stade Omnisports Idriss Mahamat Ouya, N'Djamena
Referee: Kokou Djaoupe (Togo)
4 March 2012
15:00 UTC+01:00

Sahel SC (Niger)	2–2	(Chad) Renaissance
? (?) ? (?)	Report	? (?) ? (?)

Stade Général Seyni Kountché, Niamey
Referee: Bunmi Ogunkolade (Nigeria)

Renaissance won 4–2 on aggregate and advanced to the first round.

ADR Desportivo de Mansabá (Guinea-Bissau)	w/o	(Liberia) Invincible Eleven

Invincible Eleven advanced to the first round after ADR Desportivo de Mansabá withdrew.

19 February 2012
16:00 UTC±00:00

Gamtel (The Gambia)	1–0	(Senegal) Casa Sport
Sarr 72'	Report

Serekunda East Mini-Stadium, Serekunda
Referee: Fidel Gomes (Guinea-Bissau)
4 March 2012
17:00 UTC±00:00

Casa Sport (Senegal)	1–0	(The Gambia) Gamtel
Sané 70'	Report
Penalties
	3–4

Stade Demba Diop, Dakar
Referee: Antonio Manuel Fortes Rodrigues (Cape Verde)

1–1 on aggregate. Gamtel won the penalty shootout and advanced to the first round.

18 February 2012
19:00 UTC+02:00

Extension Gunners (Botswana)	2–1	(Madagascar) Tana Formation
Ditshupo 85'; Moalosi 87'	Report	Claudel 30'

University of Botswana Stadium, Gaborone
Referee: Antonio Muachihuissa Caxala (Angola)
4 March 2012
14:30 UTC+03:00

Tana Formation (Madagascar)	2–0	(Botswana) Extension Gunners
Rakotondrasoa 4'; Ralaynddimby 31'	Report

Mahamasina Municipal Stadium, Antananarivo
Referee: Victor Miguel de Freitas Gomes (South Africa)

Tana Formation won 3–2 on aggregate and advanced to the first round.

18 February 2012
21:00 UTC+03:00

Jamhuri (Zanzibar)	0–3	(Zimbabwe) Hwange
	Report	Chinyengetere 2'; Vimisai 32'; Mungadze 47'

Gombani Stadium, Chake-Chake
4 March 2012
15:00 UTC+02:00

Hwange (Zimbabwe)	4–1	(Zanzibar) Jamhuri
Tavarwisa 25'; Chinyengetere 45'; Mpofu 49', 73'	Report	Ali Nuhu 85'

Colliery Stadium, Hwange
Referee: Kutlwano Leso (Botswana)

Hwange won 7–1 on aggregate and advanced to the first round.

== First round ==
This was a knock-out stage of 32 teams; the 16 teams advancing from the preliminary round, and 16 teams that received byes into this round.

First legs: 23–25 March; Second legs: 6–9 April.

24 March 2012
16:00 UTC±00:00

Étoile Filante (Burkina Faso)	2–2	(Ivory Coast) ASEC Mimosas
Bambara 25'; Soulama 49'	Report	Seri 21'; Diabaté 69'

Stade du 4-Août, Ouagadougou
Referee: Ousmane Fall (Senegal)
6 April 2012
15:30 UTC±00:00

ASEC Mimosas (Ivory Coast)	2–0	(Burkina Faso) Étoile Filante
Seri 35', 43'	Report

Stade Félix Houphouët-Boigny, Abidjan
Referee: Crespin Aguidissou (Benin)

ASEC Mimosas won 4–2 on aggregate and advanced to the second round.

23 March 2012
16:30 UTC±00:00

FC Séquence (Guinea)	0–2	(Morocco) CODM Meknès
	Report	Camara 27'; Khlifi 76'

Stade du 28 Septembre, Conakry
8 April 2012
16:00 UTC±00:00

CODM Meknès (Morocco)	3–0	(Guinea) FC Séquence
N'Diaye 5', 32'; Eddine 47' (pen.)	Report

Stade d'Honneur, Meknes
Referee: Abdel Alla Omar (Egypt)

CODM Meknès won 5–0 on aggregate and advanced to the second round.

24 March 2012
16:30 UTC±00:00

FC Kallon (Sierra Leone)	0–0	(Nigeria) Warri Wolves
	Report

National Stadium, Freetown
Referee: Mohamed Hamada (Mauritania)
6 April 2012
16:00 UTC+01:00

Warri Wolves (Nigeria)	2–0	(Sierra Leone) FC Kallon
Atulewa 53'; Okoyoh 85'	Report

Warri Township Stadium, Warri
Referee: Adam Cordier (Chad)

Warri Wolves won 2–0 on aggregate and advanced to the second round.

24 March 2012
15:00 UTC+02:00

Black Leopards (South Africa)	4–2	(Democratic Republic of the Congo) Saint Eloi Lupopo
Khoza 9', 43'; Obaje 45'; Madimba 52'	Report	Oprica 26'; Djunga 62'

Giyani Stadium, Giyani
Referee: Wellington Kaoma (Zambia)
6 April 2012
15:30 UTC+02:00

Saint Eloi Lupopo (Democratic Republic of the Congo)	2–2	(South Africa) Black Leopards
Ngomba 53'; Mpiana 66'	Report	Zulu 16'; Nkhatha 90'

Stade Frederic Kibassa Maliba, Lubumbashi
Referee: Romualdo Do Rasario Baltazar (Angola)

Black Leopards won 6–4 on aggregate and advanced to the second round.

24 March 2012
16:00 UTC+02:00

Royal Leopards (Eswatini)	1–1	(Democratic Republic of the Congo) US Tshinkunku
Gama 70'	Report	Lomboto 55'

Mavuso Sports Centre, Manzini
Referee: Jose Maria Rachide (Mozambique)
7 April 2012
15:30 UTC+02:00

US Tshinkunku (Democratic Republic of the Congo)	1–2	(Eswatini) Royal Leopards
Lomboto 76'	Report	Nxumalo 65'; Mthethwa 80'

Stade Frederic Kibassa Maliba, Lubumbashi
Referee: Sosthene Ngbokaye (Central African Republic)

Royal Leopards won 3–2 on aggregate and advanced to the second round.

24 March 2012
16:00 UTC+03:00

Saint George SA (Ethiopia)	1–1	(Tunisia) Club Africain
Shimelis 53'	Report	Messaadi 60'

Addis Ababa Stadium, Addis Ababa
Referee: Badr El Din Abdel Ghadir (Sudan)
7 April 2012
16:00 UTC+01:00

Club Africain (Tunisia)	2–0	(Ethiopia) Saint George SA
Bechikh 3'; Massaoued 29' (pen.)	Report

Stade El Menzah, Tunis
Referee: Rédouane Jiyed (Morocco)

Club Africain won 3–1 on aggregate and advanced to the second round.

25 March 2012
16:00 UTC+03:00

Simba (Tanzania)	2–0	(Algeria) ES Sétif
Okwi 77'; Sunzu 80'	Report

Benjamin Mkapa National Stadium, Dar es Salaam
Referee: Hudu Munyemana (Rwanda)
6 April 2012
18:00 UTC+01:00

ES Sétif (Algeria)	3–1	(Tanzania) Simba
Aoudia 34', 46'; Benmoussa 52'	Report	Okwi 90+3'

Stade 8 Mai 1945, Sétif
Referee: Mohamed Ben Hassana (Tunisia)

3–3 on aggregate. Simba won on the away goals rule and advanced to the second round.

24 March 2012
19:00 UTC+02:00

Ferroviário de Maputo (Mozambique)	0–1	(Sudan) Al-Ahly Shendi
	Report	Ikechukwu 64'

Estádio da Machava, Maputo
Referee: Joshua Bondo (Botswana)
8 April 2012
20:00 UTC+03:00

Al-Ahly Shendi (Sudan)	2–0	(Mozambique) Ferroviário de Maputo
Eltayeb 14', 60'	Report

Shendi Stadium, Shendi

Al-Ahly Shendi won 3–0 on aggregate and advanced to the second round.

24 March 2012
15:30 UTC+01:00

Unisport Bafang (Cameroon)	0–0	(Nigeria) Heartland
	Report

Stade de la Réunification, Douala
Referee: Fuengi Claude Ntuntu (Congo DR)
8 April 2012
16:00 UTC+01:00

Heartland (Nigeria)	2–1	(Cameroon) Unisport Bafang
Umar 50'; Ogbu 90+'	Report	Fardice 79'

Dan Anyiam Stadium, Owerri
Referee: Kokou Fagla (Togo)

Heartland won 2–1 on aggregate and advanced to the second round.

25 March 2012
15:30 UTC+01:00

AC Léopards (Republic of the Congo)	1–2	(Tunisia) CS Sfaxien
Komara 31'	Report	Haddad 10'; Soumah 14'

Stade Denis Sassou Nguesso, Dolisie
Referee: Waziri Sheha Waziri (Tanzania)
7 April 2012
17:00 UTC+01:00

CS Sfaxien (Tunisia)	0–2	(Republic of the Congo) AC Léopards
	Report	Nyamba 43', 78'

Stade Taïeb Mhiri, Sfax
Referee: Ousmane Karembe (Mali)

AC Léopards won 3–2 on aggregate and advanced to the second round.

24 March 2012
15:30 UTC+02:00

LLB Académic (Burundi)	1–1	(Egypt) ENPPI
Nasef 59' (o.g.)	Report	Mostafa 90'

Prince Louis Rwagasore Stadium, Bujumbura
Referee: Bernard Camille (Seychelles)
7 April 2012
19:00 UTC+02:00

ENPPI (Egypt)	4–1	(Burundi) LLB Académic
El-Zaher 7'; Raouf 37', 45', 75'	Report	Youssef 90'

Petro Sport Stadium, Cairo
Referee: Bamlak Tessema Weyesa (Ethiopia)

ENPPI won 5–2 on aggregate and advanced to the second round.

25 March 2012
15:00 UTC+01:00

Renaissance (Chad)	3–2	(Mali) Cercle Olympique de Bamako
Nadjipang 46'; Lambert 70', 90'	Report	Kébé 10'; Keita 66'

Stade Omnisports Idriss Mahamat Ouya, N'Djamena
Referee: Yves Roponat Mbourou (Gabon)
6 April 2012
17:00 UTC±00:00

Cercle Olympique de Bamako (Mali)	3–1	(Chad) Renaissance
Keita 12'; Diarra 15', 60'	Report	Alladjim 35'

Stade 26 mars, Bamako

Cercle Olympique won 5–4 on aggregate and advanced to the second round.

24 March 2012
16:00 UTC±00:00

Invincible Eleven (Liberia)	0–2	(Morocco) Wydad AC
	Report	Mouithys 68'; Iajour 77'

Antoinette Tubman Stadium, Monrovia
Referee: Raymond Coker (Sierra Leone)
7 April 2012
17:30 UTC±00:00

Wydad AC (Morocco)	4–1	(Liberia) Invincible Eleven
Iajour 28'; El Amrani 65'; Koné 76'; Houassi 88'	Report	Herron 53'

Stade Mohamed V, Casablanca
Referee: Boukari Ouédraogo (Burkina Faso)

Wydad AC won 6–1 on aggregate and advanced to the second round.

25 March 2012
16:30 UTC±00:00

Gamtel (The Gambia)	1–0	(Mali) AS Real Bamako
Suso 90+2'	Report

Independence Stadium, Bakau
9 April 2012
17:00 UTC±00:00

AS Real Bamako (Mali)	3–1	(The Gambia) Gamtel
Souso 18'; B. Coulibaly 57'; Kondé 63'	Report	Soîdé 72'

Stade 26 mars, Bamako
Referee: Yakhouba Keita (Guinea)

AS Real Bamako won 3–2 on aggregate and advanced to the second round.

25 March 2012
14:30 UTC+03:00

Tana Formation (Madagascar)	2–0	(Angola) Interclube
Bela 8', 75'	Report

Mahamasina Municipal Stadium, Antananarivo
Referee: Simanga Nhleko (Swaziland)
8 April 2012
15:30 UTC+01:00

Interclube (Angola)	2–0	(Madagascar) Tana Formation
Joél 44' (pen.); Moco 76'	Report
Penalties
	6–5

Estádio Joaquim Dinis, Luanda
Referee: Lazard Tsiba Kamba (Congo)

2–2 on aggregate. Interclube won the penalty shootout and advanced to the second round.

25 March 2012
15:00 UTC+02:00

Hwange (Zimbabwe)	1–1	(Sudan) Alamal Atbara
Chinyengetere 44'	Report	Mahbob 7'

Colliery Stadium, Hwange
Referee: Anthony Ramsy Raphael (Malawi)
8 April 2012
19:30 UTC+03:00

Alamal Atbara (Sudan)	0–0	(Zimbabwe) Hwange
	Report

Stade Al-Amal Atbara, Atbarah
Referee: Mensur Maeruf Kherseed (Eritrea)

1–1 on aggregate. Alamal Atbara won on the away goals rule and advanced to the second round.

== Second round ==
This was a knock-out stage of the 16 teams that advanced from the first round; winners advanced to the play-off round, where they were joined by the eight losers from the CAF Champions League second round.

First legs: 27–29 April; Second legs 11–13 May.

28 April 2012
15:30 UTC±00:00

ASEC Mimosas (Ivory Coast)	1–1	(Morocco) CODM Meknès
Okou 41'	Report	N'Diaye 60'

Stade Félix Houphouët-Boigny, Abidjan
Referee: Daniel Bennett (South Africa)
13 May 2012
18:00 UTC+01:00

CODM Meknès (Morocco)	0–0	(Ivory Coast) ASEC Mimosas
	Report

Stade d'Honneur, Meknes
Referee: William Agbovi (Ghana)

1–1 on aggregate. CODM Meknès won on the away goals rule and advanced to the play-off round.

29 April 2012
16:00 UTC+01:00

Warri Wolves (Nigeria)	3–1	(South Africa) Black Leopards
Amutu 25', 47'; Atulewa 55'	Report	Monama 20'

Warri Township Stadium, Warri
Referee: Ousmane Fall (Senegal)
13 May 2012
15:00 UTC+02:00

Black Leopards (South Africa)	2–0	(Nigeria) Warri Wolves
Nkhatha 25', 67'	Report

Peter Mokaba Stadium, Polokwane
Referee: Waziri Sheha Waziri (Tanzania)

3–3 on aggregate. Black Leopards won on the away goals rule and advanced to the play-off round.

28 April 2012
15:30 UTC+02:00

Royal Leopards (Eswatini)	0–1	(Tunisia) Club Africain
	Report	Ndouassel 14'

Mavuso Sports Centre, Manzini
Referee: Anthony Ramsy Raphael (Malawi)
12 May 2012
16:00 UTC+01:00

Club Africain (Tunisia)	4–2	(Eswatini) Royal Leopards
Ndouassel 15', 54', 62'; Agrebi 69' (pen.)	Report	Gama 6'; Nxumalo 30'

Stade Olympique de Radès, Tunis
Referee: Mal Souley Mohamadou (Cameroon)

Club Africain won 5–2 on aggregate and advanced to the play-off round.

29 April 2012
16:00 UTC+03:00

Simba (Tanzania)	3–0	(Sudan) Al-Ahly Shendi
Moshi 66'; Mafisango 81'; Okwi 90'	Report

Benjamin Mkapa National Stadium, Dar-es-Salaam
Referee: Simanga Nhleko (Swaziland)
13 May 2012
20:00 UTC+03:00

Al-Ahly Shendi (Sudan)	3–0	(Tanzania) Simba
Farid 46', 60'; Sadam 49'	Report
Penalties
	9–8

Shendi Stadium, Shendi
Referee: Mensur Maeruf Kherseed (Eritrea)

3–3 on aggregate. Al-Ahly Shendi won the penalty shootout and advanced to the play-off round.

29 April 2012
16:00 UTC+01:00

Heartland (Nigeria)	3–2	(Republic of the Congo) AC Léopards
Umar 27'; Ogbu 64'; Okoro 81'	Report	Kombo 24'; Bhebey Ndey 71'

Dan Anyiam Stadium, Owerri
Referee: Rajindraparsad Seechurn (Mauritius)
13 May 2012
15:30 UTC+01:00

AC Léopards (Republic of the Congo)	2–1	(Nigeria) Heartland
Bhebey Ndey 43'; Mombo 90' (pen.)	Report	Kabiru 80'

Stade Denis Sassou Nguesso, Dolisie
Referee: Hudu Munyemana (Rwanda)

4–4 on aggregate. AC Léopards won on the away goals rule and advanced to the play-off round.

27 April 2012
19:00 UTC+02:00

ENPPI (Egypt)	3–1	(Mali) Cercle Olympique de Bamako
El Halwani 2'; Die Foneye 28', 75'	Report	Diarra 77'

Cairo Military Academy Stadium, Cairo
Referee: Badr El Din Abdel Ghadir (Sudan)
13 May 2012
16:00 UTC±00:00

Cercle Olympique de Bamako (Mali)	3–0	(Egypt) ENPPI
Diarra 58', 70'; Traoré 81'	Report

Stade Modibo Kéïta, Bamako
Referee: Mohamed Ben Hassana (Tunisia)

Cercle Olympique de Bamako won 4–3 on aggregate and advanced to the play-off round.

29 April 2012
19:00 UTC+01:00

Wydad AC (Morocco)	3–0	(Mali) AS Real Bamako
Lakhal 9'; Fettah 53'; Houassi 67'	Report

Stade Mohamed V, Casablanca
Referee: Eric Otogo Castane (Gabon)
12 May 2012
16:00 UTC±00:00

AS Real Bamako (Mali)	1–0	(Morocco) Wydad AC
Traoré 72'	Report

Stade Modibo Kéïta, Bamako
Referee: Henry Ogunyamodi (Nigeria)

Wydad AC won 3–1 on aggregate and advanced to the play-off round.

29 April 2012
17:00 UTC+01:00

Interclube (Angola)	4–1	(Sudan) Alamal Atbara
Moco 31', 53'; Alex 72'; Amari 90' (o.g.)	Report	Sayed 34'

Estádio Joaquim Dinis, Luanda
Referee: Rainhold Shikongo (Namibia)
13 May 2012
19:30 UTC+03:00

Alamal Atbara (Sudan)	0–2	(Angola) Interclube
	Report	Kialunda 27'; Paty 73'

Stade Al-Amal Atbara, Atbarah
Referee: Adam Cordier (Chad)

Interclube won 6–1 on aggregate and advanced to the play-off round.

== Play-off round ==
This was a knock-out stage of 16 teams: the eight teams that advanced from the second round, and the eight teams that were eliminated in the CAF Champions League second round. In each tie, a winner from the Confederation Cup second round played against a loser from the Champions League second round, with the Confederation Cup winner hosting the second leg at home. Winners advanced to the group stage.

The draw for the play-off round and group stage was held on 15 May 2012, 14:00 UTC+02:00, at the CAF Headquarters in Cairo. For the play-off round draw, two teams were seeded (using their individual 2007–2011 5-Year team Ranking).

Winners from Confederation Cup second round

- (Morocco) Wydad AC 20 pts
- (Tunisia) Club Africain 17 pts
- (Angola) Interclube 12 pts
- (Morocco) CODM Meknès 0 pts
- (South Africa) Black Leopards 0 pts
- (Sudan) Al-Ahly Shendi 0 pts
- (Republic of the Congo) AC Léopards 0 pts
- (Mali) Cercle Olympique de Bamako 0 pts

Losers from Champions League second round

- (Sudan) Al-Hilal 37 pts (top seed)
- (Morocco) Maghreb de Fès 20 pts (top seed)
- (Cameroon) Coton Sport 18 pts
- (Mali) Stade Malien 12 pts
- (Sudan) Al-Merreikh 10 pts
- (Zimbabwe) Dynamos 10 pts
- (Mali) Djoliba 4 pts
- (Ivory Coast) AFAD Djékanou 0 pts

First legs: 29 June–1 July; Second legs: 13–15 July.

30 June 2012
20:00 UTC+01:00

Maghreb de Fès (Morocco)	1–0	(Republic of the Congo) AC Léopards
Abourazzouk 50'	Report

Fez Stadium, Fes
Referee: Aboubacar Bangoura (Guinea)
14 July 2012
15:30 UTC+01:00

AC Léopards (Republic of the Congo)	2–0	(Morocco) Maghreb de Fès
Kombo 40'; Guolelida 90+20' (pen.)	Report

Stade Denis Sassou Nguesso, Dolisie
Referee: Romualdo Do Rasario Baltazar (Angola)

AC Léopards won 2–1 on aggregate and advanced to the group stage.

29 June 2012
20:00 UTC+03:00

Al-Hilal (Sudan)	2–0	(Mali) Cercle Olympique de Bamako
Almadina 22'; Sadomba 66'	Report

Al-Hilal Stadium, Omdurman
Referee: Bernard Camille (Seychelles)
14 July 2012
16:00 UTC±00:00

Cercle Olympique de Bamako (Mali)	0–1	(Sudan) Al-Hilal
	Report	Mudather 28'

Stade Modibo Kéïta, Bamako
Referee: Ousmane Fall (Senegal)

Al-Hilal won 3–0 on aggregate and advanced to the group stage.

30 June 2012
15:30 UTC±00:00

AFAD Djékanou (Ivory Coast)	0–1	(Morocco) Wydad AC
	Report	Lakhal 34'

Stade Robert Champroux, Abidjan
Referee: Mehdi Abid-Charef (Algeria)
14 July 2012
20:00 UTC+01:00

Wydad AC (Morocco)	0–0	(Ivory Coast) AFAD Djékanou
	Report

Stade Mohamed V, Casablanca
Referee: Mohamed Kordi (Tunisia)

Wydad AC won 1–0 on aggregate and advanced to the group stage.

30 June 2012
20:00 UTC+03:00

Al-Merreikh (Sudan)	3–2	(South Africa) Black Leopards
El Shigail 41'; El-Basha 51', 57'	Report	Bobe 82'; Zulu 85'

Al-Merreikh Stadium, Omdurman
Referee: Mahmoud Ashour (Egypt)
14 July 2012
15:00 UTC+02:00

Black Leopards (South Africa)	0–0	(Sudan) Al-Merreikh
	Report

Ellis Park Stadium, Johannesburg
Referee: Rainhold Shikongo (Namibia)

Al-Merreikh won 3–2 on aggregate and advanced to the group stage.

2 July 2012
16:00 UTC±00:00

Djoliba (Mali)	2–0	(Tunisia) Club Africain
Traoré 6'; Abouta 45' (pen.)	Report

Stade Modibo Kéïta, Bamako
Referee: Henry Ogunyamodi (Nigeria)
14 July 2012
19:00 UTC+01:00

Club Africain (Tunisia)	2–0	(Mali) Djoliba
Agrebi 31'; Massaoued 90+7' (pen.)	Report
Penalties
	3–4

Stade Olympique de Radès, Tunis
Referee: Eric Otogo Castane (Gabon)

Note: First leg postponed due to heavy rains in Bamako.

2–2 on aggregate. Djoliba won the penalty shootout and advanced to the group stage.

1 July 2012
15:00 UTC+02:00

Dynamos (Zimbabwe)	0–0	(Angola) Interclube
	Report

Rufaro Stadium, Harare
Referee: Hamada Nampiandraza (Madagascar)
15 July 2012
17:00 UTC+01:00

Interclube (Angola)	1–0	(Zimbabwe) Dynamos
Manucho 36'	Report

Estádio Joaquim Dinis, Luanda
Referee: Joshua Bondo (Botswana)

Interclube won 1–0 on aggregate and advanced to the group stage.

30 June 2012
17:00 UTC±00:00

Stade Malien (Mali)	3–0	(Morocco) CODM Meknès
Diawara 45+1'; M. Coulibaly 62' (pen.); Cissé 90+1'	Report

Stade Modibo Kéïta, Bamako
Referee: Kokou Djaoupe (Togo)
14 July 2012
21:00 UTC+01:00

CODM Meknès (Morocco)	1–1	(Mali) Stade Malien
Semlali 22'	Report	Diawara 43'

Stade d'Honneur, Meknes
Referee: Aly Lemghaifry (Mauritania)

Stade Malien won 4–1 on aggregate and advanced to the group stage.

1 July 2012
15:30 UTC+01:00

Coton Sport (Cameroon)	1–0	(Sudan) Al-Ahly Shendi
Bapidi 8' (pen.)	Report

Roumdé Adjia Stadium, Garoua
Referee: Ousmane Karembe (Mali)
15 July 2012
20:00 UTC+03:00

Al-Ahly Shendi (Sudan)	2–0	(Cameroon) Coton Sport
Pathero 22'; Yakubu 50'	Report

Shendi Stadium, Shendi
Referee: Janny Sikazwe (Zambia)

Al-Ahly Shendi won 2–1 on aggregate and advanced to the group stage.
