= 2012 CAF Confederation Cup group stage =

- Dates: 4 August – 21 October 2012

Tournament statistics
- Matches played: 24
- Goals scored: 58 (2.42 per match)

The 2012 CAF Confederation Cup group stage matches took place between August and October 2012. The matchdays were 3–5 August, 17–19 August, 31 August–2 September, 14–16 September, 5–7 October, and 19–21 October.

The group stage featured the eight winners from the play-off round. They were divided into two groups of four, where they played each other home-and-away in a round-robin format. The top two teams in each group advanced to the semifinals.

== Seeding ==
The draw for the play-off round and group stage was held on 15 May 2012, 14:00 UTC+02:00, at the CAF Headquarters in Cairo. For the group stage draw, the winners of the play-off round ties involving the two teams seeded in the play-off round (using their individual 2007–2011 5-Year team Ranking) were seeded into Pot 1, and the winners of the remaining ties were seeded into Pot 2. Each group contained one team from Pot 1 and three teams from Pot 2.

	Play-off round ties		
	Team 1 (CL 2nd round losers)	v	Team 2 (CC 2nd round winners)
Pot 1	(top seed) Maghreb de Fès (Morocco)	v	(Republic of the Congo) **AC Léopards**
Pot 1	(top seed) **Al-Hilal** (Sudan)	v	(Mali) Cercle Olympique de Bamako
Pot 2	AFAD Djékanou (Ivory Coast)	v	(Morocco) **Wydad AC**
Pot 2	**Al-Merreikh** (Sudan)	v	(South Africa) Black Leopards
Pot 2	**Djoliba** (Mali)	v	(Tunisia) Club Africain
Pot 2	Dynamos (Zimbabwe)	v	(Angola) **Interclube**
Pot 2	**Stade Malien** (Mali)	v	(Morocco) CODM Meknès
Pot 2	Coton Sport (Cameroon)	v	(Sudan) **Al-Ahly Shendi**

Notes

- Winners of each tie shown in **bold**

== Tiebreakers ==
The order of tie-breakers used when two or more teams have equal number of points is:

1. Number of points obtained in games between the teams concerned
2. Goal difference in games between the teams concerned
3. Away goals scored in games between the teams concerned
4. Goal difference in all games
5. Goals scored in all games

== Groups ==
=== Group A ===
Team	Pld	W	D	L	GF	GA	GD	Pts
(Sudan) Al-Merreikh	6	4	2	0	8	3	+5	**14**
(Sudan) Al-Hilal	6	3	2	1	11	6	+5	**11**
(Angola) Interclube	6	1	2	3	3	7	−4	**5**
(Sudan) Al-Ahly Shendi	6	1	0	5	3	9	−6	**3**

4 August 2012
22:00 UTC+03:00

Al-Merreikh (Sudan)	1–0	(Angola) Interclube
El-Basha 86'	Report

Al-Merreikh Stadium, Omdurman
Referee: Mehdi Abid-Charef (Algeria)
5 August 2012
22:00 UTC+03:00

Al-Ahly Shendi (Sudan)	1–2	(Sudan) Al-Hilal
Hamouda 55'	Report	Mudather 45'; Sané 68'

Shendi Stadium, Shendi
Referee: Rajindraparsad Seechurn (Mauritius)

18 August 2012
22:00 UTC+03:00

Al-Hilal (Sudan)	1–1	(Sudan) Al-Merreikh
Sadomba 46'	Report	Osunwa 45+1'

Al-Hilal Stadium, Omdurman
Referee: Hamada Nampiandraza (Madagascar)
19 August 2012
17:00 UTC+01:00

Interclube (Angola)	0–1	(Sudan) Al-Ahly Shendi
	Report	Yakubu 84'

Estádio Joaquim Dinis, Luanda
Referee: Rainhold Shikongo (Namibia)

31 August 2012
19:00 UTC+03:00

Al-Merreikh (Sudan)	2–0	(Sudan) Al-Ahly Shendi
Osunwa 70'; El-Basha 82'	Report

Al-Merreikh Stadium, Omdurman
Referee: Ghead Grisha (Egypt)
1 September 2012
17:00 UTC+01:00

Interclube (Angola)	1–1	(Sudan) Al-Hilal
Kialunda 35'	Report	Sadomba 71'

Estádio Joaquim Dinis, Luanda
Referee: Anthony Ramsy Raphael (Malawi)

14 September 2012
20:30 UTC+03:00

Al-Hilal (Sudan)	3–0	(Angola) Interclube
Sané 13'; Mudather 32'; Muhannad 42'	Report

Al-Hilal Stadium, Omdurman
Referee: Hudu Munyemana (Rwanda)
16 September 2012
21:00 UTC+03:00

Al-Ahly Shendi (Sudan)	0–1	(Sudan) Al-Merreikh
	Report	Eder Lima 75'

Shendi Stadium, Shendi
Referee: Rédouane Jiyed (Morocco)

5 October 2012
19:00 UTC+03:00

Al-Hilal (Sudan)	2–0	(Sudan) Al-Ahly Shendi
Sadomba 42', 70'	Report

Al-Hilal Stadium, Omdurman
Referee: Sylvester Kirwa (Kenya)
6 October 2012
15:30 UTC+01:00

Interclube (Angola)	0–0	(Sudan) Al-Merreikh
	Report

Estádio Joaquim Dinis, Luanda
Referee: Ruzive Ruzive (Zimbabwe)

20 October 2012
19:00 UTC+03:00

Al-Ahly Shendi (Sudan)	1–2	(Angola) Interclube
Sadam 8' (pen.)	Report	Joél Mpongo 5' (pen.); Moco 64'

Shendi Stadium, Shendi
Referee: Bamlak Tessema Weyesa (Ethiopia)
20 October 2012
19:00 UTC+03:00

Al-Merreikh (Sudan)	3–2	(Sudan) Al-Hilal
Abdalla 10'; Sakuwaha 15' (pen.), 83'	Report	Muhannad 40', 90+2'

Al-Merreikh Stadium, Omdurman
Referee: Janny Sikazwe (Zambia)

=== Group B ===
Team	Pld	W	D	L	GF	GA	GD	Pts
(Mali) Djoliba	6	4	1	1	9	7	+2	**13**
(Republic of the Congo) AC Léopards	6	2	3	1	8	6	+2	**9**
(Morocco) Wydad AC	6	1	3	2	10	10	0	**6**
(Mali) Stade Malien	6	0	3	3	6	10	−4	**3**

4 August 2012
15:30 UTC+01:00

AC Léopards (Republic of the Congo)	1–1	(Morocco) Wydad AC
Moukassa 10'	Report	El Mnassfi 60'

Stade Denis Sassou Nguesso, Dolisie
Referee: Janny Sikazwe (Zambia)
5 August 2012
16:00 UTC±00:00

Stade Malien (Mali)	0–2	(Mali) Djoliba
	Report	Y. Coulibaly 4'; Cissé 70'

Stade 26 mars, Bamako
Referee: Aboubacar Bangoura (Guinea)

18 August 2012
16:30 UTC±00:00

Djoliba (Mali)	1–1	(Republic of the Congo) AC Léopards
Bagayoko 65'	Report	Bhebey Ndey 4'

Stade Modibo Kéïta, Bamako
Referee: William Agbovi (Ghana)
18 August 2012
22:00 UTC±00:00

Wydad AC (Morocco)	1–1	(Mali) Stade Malien
Lakhal 43'	Report	M. Coulibaly 87'

Stade Mohamed V, Casablanca
Referee: Mohammed Farouk (Egypt)

1 September 2012
16:30 UTC±00:00

Stade Malien (Mali)	1–1	(Republic of the Congo) AC Léopards
Cissé 35'	Report	Lakolo 41'

Stade Modibo Kéïta, Bamako
Referee: Ali Kalyango (Uganda)
2 September 2012
16:00 UTC±00:00

Djoliba (Mali)	2–1	(Morocco) Wydad AC
Bagayoko 76'; Sidibé 90+4' (pen.)	Report	Houassi 38'

Stade Modibo Kéïta, Bamako
Referee: Ousmane Fall (Senegal)

15 September 2012
20:30 UTC+01:00

Wydad AC (Morocco)	1–2	(Mali) Djoliba
El Mnassfi 25'	Report	Bagayoko 11'; A. Bangoura 90+2'

Stade Mohamed V, Casablanca
Referee: Ali Lemghaifry (Mauritania)
16 September 2012
15:30 UTC+01:00

AC Léopards (Republic of the Congo)	1–0	(Mali) Stade Malien
Gandzé 25'	Report

Stade Denis Sassou Nguesso, Dolisie
Referee: Bernard Camille (Seychelles)

6 October 2012
19:30 UTC±00:00

Wydad AC (Morocco)	3–1	(Republic of the Congo) AC Léopards
Koné 21'; El Hillali 53'; El Mnassfi 90+1'	Report	Bhebey Ndey 73'

Stade Mohamed V, Casablanca
Referee: Ousmane Fall (Senegal)
7 October 2012
15:30 UTC±00:00

Djoliba (Mali)	2–1	(Mali) Stade Malien
Traoré 44' (pen.); I. Bangoura 72' (pen.)	Report	Diarra 66'

Stade Modibo Kéïta, Bamako
Referee: Said Kordi (Tunisia)

21 October 2012
17:00 UTC+01:00

AC Léopards (Republic of the Congo)	3–0	(Mali) Djoliba
Kombo 8'; Lakolo 66'; Kivouri 78'	Report

Stade Denis Sassou Nguesso, Dolisie
Referee: Joshua Bondo (Botswana)
21 October 2012
16:00 UTC±00:00

Stade Malien (Mali)	3–3	(Morocco) Wydad AC
Bo. Coulibaly 7'; Ba. Coulibaly 30'; Diawara 90'	Report	El Hillali 18'; Mouithys 64'; Benkajjane 90+3'

Stade Modibo Kéïta, Bamako
Referee: Denis Dembélé (Ivory Coast)
