= 2012 CAF Confederation Cup final =

- Event: 2012 CAF Confederation Cup
Djoliba	AC Léopards
(Mali)	(Republic of the Congo)
3	4
- on aggregate

First leg
Djoliba	AC Léopards
2	2
- Date: 18 November 2012
- Venue: Stade 26 mars, Bamako
- Referee: Daniel Bennett (South Africa)

Second Leg
AC Léopards	Djoliba
2	1
- Date: 25 November 2012
- Venue: Stade Denis Sassou Nguesso, Dolisie
- Referee: Néant Alioum (Cameroon)

The 2012 CAF Confederation Cup final was the final of 2012 CAF Confederation Cup, the 9th edition of the CAF Confederation Cup, Africa's secondary club football competition organized by the Confederation of African Football (CAF).

The final was played between Djoliba from Mali and AC Léopards from the Republic of the Congo. AC Léopards won 4–3 on aggregate (first leg: 2–2; second leg: 2–1) to win their first title. As the winner of the 2012 CAF Confederation Cup, they qualified to participate in the 2013 CAF Super Cup against the winner of the 2012 CAF Champions League.

== Road to final ==
(Mali) Djoliba				Round	(Republic of the Congo) AC Léopards			
Champions League					Confederation Cup			
Opponent	Agg.	1st leg	2nd leg	Qualifying rounds	Opponent	Agg.	1st leg	2nd leg
Bye				Preliminary round	(Central African Republic) AS Tempête Mocaf	4–2	2–0 (H)	2–2 (A)
(Uganda) URA	w/o^{†}	2–0 (A)	—	First round	(Tunisia) CS Sfaxien	3–2	1–2 (H)	2–0 (A)
(Nigeria) Sunshine Stars	1–2	1–1 (H)	0–1 (A)	Second round	(Nigeria) Heartland	4–4 (a)	2–3 (A)	2–1 (H)
Confederation Cup
(Tunisia) Club Africain	2–2 (4–3 p)	2–0 (H)	0–2 (A)	Play-off round	(Morocco) Maghreb de Fès	2–1	0–1 (A)	2–0 (H)
Opponent	Result			Group stage	Opponent	Result		
(Mali) Stade Malien	2–0 (A)			Matchday 1	(Morocco) Wydad Casablanca	1–1 (H)		
(Republic of the Congo) AC Léopards	1–1 (H)			Matchday 2	(Mali) Djoliba	1–1 (A)		
(Morocco) Wydad Casablanca	2–1 (H)			Matchday 3	(Mali) Stade Malien	1–1 (A)		
(Morocco) Wydad Casablanca	2–1 (A)			Matchday 4	(Mali) Stade Malien	1–0 (H)		
(Mali) Stade Malien	2–1 (H)			Matchday 5	(Morocco) Wydad Casablanca	1–3 (A)		
(Republic of the Congo) AC Léopards	0–3 (A)			Matchday 6	(Mali) Djoliba	3–0 (H)		
Group B winner: Team / Pld / W / D / L / GF / GA / GD / Pts; (Mali) Djoliba / 6 / 4 / 1 / 1 / 9 / 7 / +2 / 13; (Republic of the Congo) AC Léopards / 6 / 2 / 3 / 1 / 8 / 6 / +2 / 9; (Morocco) Wydad Casablanca / 6 / 1 / 3 / 2 / 10 / 10 / 0 / 6; (Mali) Stade Malien / 6 / 0 / 3 / 3 / 6 / 10 / −4 / 3				Final standings	Group B runner-up: Team / Pld / W / D / L / GF / GA / GD / Pts; (Mali) Djoliba / 6 / 4 / 1 / 1 / 9 / 7 / +2 / 13; (Republic of the Congo) AC Léopards / 6 / 2 / 3 / 1 / 8 / 6 / +2 / 9; (Morocco) Wydad Casablanca / 6 / 1 / 3 / 2 / 10 / 10 / 0 / 6; (Mali) Stade Malien / 6 / 0 / 3 / 3 / 6 / 10 / −4 / 3			
Opponent	Agg.	1st leg	2nd leg	Knock-out stage	Opponent	Agg.	1st leg	2nd leg
(Sudan) Al-Hilal	2–2 (7–6 p)	0–2 (A)	2–0 (H)	Semifinals	(Sudan) Al-Merreikh	2–1	2–1 (H)	0–0 (A)

Notes

^{†} Djoliba advanced to the second round after being awarded the tie by CAF, as URA did not travel to Mali for the second leg due to the Malian crisis.

== Rules ==
The final was decided over two legs, with aggregate goals used to determine the winner. If the sides were level on aggregate after the second leg, the away goals rule would have been applied, and if still level, the tie would have proceeded directly to a penalty shootout (no extra time is played).

== First leg ==
18 November 2012
20:00 UTC±00:00

Djoliba (Mali)	2–2	(Republic of the Congo) AC Léopards
Bagayoko 36' (pen.); S. Coulibaly 74'	Report	Kivouri 22'; Ngouelou 87'

Stade Modibo Kéïta, Bamako
Referee: Daniel Bennett (South Africa)

== Second leg ==
25 November 2012
15:30 UTC+01:00

AC Léopards (Republic of the Congo)	2–1	(Mali) Djoliba
Gandzé 24'; Bhebey Ndey 45'	Report	S. Coulibaly 34'

Stade Denis Sassou Nguesso, Dolisie
Referee: Néant Alioum (Cameroon)
