= 2012 CAF Confederation Cup knockout stage =

The 2012 CAF Confederation Cup knock-out stage matches took place in November 2012. The matchdays were: 2–4 November (semifinals first leg), 9–11 November (semifinals second leg), 16–18 November (final first leg), 23–25 December (final second leg).

All knock-out ties were decided over two legs, with aggregate goals used to determine the winner. If the sides were level on aggregate after the second leg, the away goals rule applied, and if still level, the tie proceeded directly to a penalty shootout (no extra time is played).

== Qualified teams ==
The knock-out stage featured four teams: the two group winners and the two group runners-up from the group stage. In the semi-finals, the group A winners played the group B runners-up, and the group B winners played the group A runners-up. In both ties, the group winners hosted the second leg at home.

Group	Winners	Runners-up
A	(Sudan) Al-Merreikh	(Sudan) Al-Hilal
B	(Mali) Djoliba	(Republic of the Congo) AC Léopards

== Semifinals ==
4 November 2012
15:30 UTC+01:00

AC Léopards (Republic of the Congo)	2–1	(Sudan) Al-Merreikh
Gandzé 49'; Dramé 83'	Report	Osunwa 55'

Stade Denis Sassou Nguesso, Dolisie
Referee: Bakary Gassama (Gambia)
10 November 2012
19:00 UTC+03:00

Al-Merreikh (Sudan)	0–0	(Republic of the Congo) AC Léopards
	Report

Al-Merreikh Stadium, Omdurman
Referee: Mohamed Benouza (Algeria)

AC Léopards won 2–1 on aggregate and advanced to the 2012 CAF Confederation Cup Final.

2 November 2012
20:00 UTC+03:00

Al-Hilal (Sudan)	2–0	(Mali) Djoliba
Sané 44'; Mudather 48'	Report

Al-Hilal Stadium, Omdurman
Referee: Gehad Grisha (Egypt)
11 November 2012
15:30 UTC±00:00

Djoliba (Mali)	2–0	(Sudan) Al-Hilal
Traoré 53'; Abouta 81' (pen.)	Report
Penalties
	7–6

Stade Modibo Kéïta, Bamako
Referee: Badara Diatta (Senegal)

2–2 on aggregate. Djoliba won the penalty shootout and advanced to the 2012 CAF Confederation Cup Final.

== Final ==
18 November 2012
20:00 UTC±00:00

Djoliba (Mali)	2–2	(Republic of the Congo) AC Léopards
Bagayoko 36' (pen.); S. Coulibaly 74'	Report	Kivouri 22'; Ngouelou 87'

Stade Modibo Kéïta, Bamako
Referee: Daniel Bennett (South Africa)
25 November 2012
15:30 UTC+01:00

AC Léopards (Republic of the Congo)	2–1	(Mali) Djoliba
Gandzé 24'; Bhebey Ndey 45'	Report	S. Coulibaly 34'

Stade Denis Sassou Nguesso, Dolisie
Referee: Néant Alioum (Cameroon)

AC Léopards won 4–3 on aggregate.
