= List of CAF Confederation Cup finals =

- Founded: 2004
- Region: Africa (CAF)
- Teams: 16 (group stage) from 59; 2 (finalists)
- Current champions: (Algeria) USM Alger (2nd title)
- Most championships: (Morocco) RS Berkane (Tunisia) CS Sfaxien (3 titles each)
- 2025–26 CAF Confederation Cup

This article details the records and statistics of the CAF Confederation Cup, a seasonal football club competition run by the Confederation of African Football and established from a merger of the African Cup Winners' Cup and the CAF Cup in 2004.

== List of finals ==
Key
Match was won on an away goals
Match was won on a penalty shoot-out

- The "Year" column refers to the season the competition was held, and wikilinks to the article about that season.
- Finals are listed in the order they were played.

List of CAF Confederation Cup finals
Two-legged format
Season	Home		Score	Away		Venue	Attendance
Season	Nation	Club	Score	Club	Nation	Venue	Attendance
2004	Ghana	Hearts of Oak	1–1	Asante Kotoko	Ghana	Ohene Djan Stadium, Accra	
2004	Ghana	Hearts of Oak	1–1	Asante Kotoko	Ghana	Baba Yara Stadium, Kumasi	
2004	Hearts of Oak won 8–7 on penalties (2–2 on aggregate)						
2005	Nigeria	Dolphins FC	1–0	FAR Rabat	Morocco	Liberation Stadium, Port Harcourt	12,000
2005	Nigeria	Dolphins FC	0–3	FAR Rabat	Morocco	Moulay Abdellah Stadium, Rabat	52,000
2005	FAR Rabat won 3–1 on aggregate						
2006	Morocco	FAR Rabat	1–1	ES Sahel	Tunisia	Moulay Abdellah Stadium, Rabat	52,000
2006	Morocco	FAR Rabat	0–0	ES Sahel	Tunisia	Stade Olympique de Sousse, Sousse	
2006	ES Sahel won on away goals (1–1 on aggregate)						
2007	Sudan	Al-Merrikh	2–4	CS Sfaxien	Tunisia	Al-Merrikh Stadium, Omdurman	
2007	Sudan	Al-Merrikh	0–1	CS Sfaxien	Tunisia	Stade Taïeb Mhiri, Sfax	
2007	CS Sfaxien won 5–2 on aggregate						
2008	Tunisia	CS Sfaxien	0–0	ES Sahel	Tunisia	Stade Taïeb Mhiri, Sfax	
2008	Tunisia	CS Sfaxien	2–2	ES Sahel	Tunisia	Stade Olympique de Sousse, Sousse	
2008	CS Sfaxien won on away goals (2–2 on aggregate)						
2009	Algeria	ES Setif	2–0	Stade Malien	Mali	Stade 8 Mai 1945, Setif	25,000
2009	Algeria	ES Setif	0–2	Stade Malien	Mali	Stade Modibo Kéïta, Bamako	35,000
2009	Stade Malien won 3–2 on penalties (2–2 on aggregate)						
2010	Morocco	FUS de Rabat	0–0	CS Sfaxien	Tunisia	Moulay Abdellah Stadium, Rabat	52,000
2010	Morocco	FUS de Rabat	3–2	CS Sfaxien	Tunisia	Stade Taïeb Mhiri, Sfax	
2010	FUS de Rabat won 3–2 on aggregate						
2011	Tunisia	Club Africain	1–0	MAS Fez	Morocco	Stade 14 January, Radès	65,000
2011	Tunisia	Club Africain	0–1	MAS Fez	Morocco	Fez Stadium, Fes	45,000
2011	MAS Fez won 6–5 on penalties (1–1 on aggregate)						
2012	Mali	Djoliba AC	2–2	AC Léopards	Congo	Stade 26 mars, Bamako	55,000
2012	Mali	Djoliba AC	1–2	AC Léopards	Congo	Stade Denis Sassou Nguesso, Dolisie	20,000
2012	AC Léopards won 4–3 on aggregate						
2013	Tunisia	CS Sfaxien	2–0	TP Mazembe	DR Congo	Stade Olympique de Radès, Tunis	
2013	Tunisia	CS Sfaxien	1–2	TP Mazembe	DR Congo	Stade TP Mazembe, Lubumbashi	18,000
2013	CS Sfaxien won 3–2 on aggregate						
2014	Ivory Coast	Séwé Sport	2–1	Al Ahly	Egypt	Stade Robert Champroux, Abidjan	5,000
2014	Ivory Coast	Séwé Sport	0–1	Al Ahly	Egypt	Cairo International Stadium, Cairo	40,000
2014	Al Ahly won on away goals (2–2 on aggregate)						
2015	South Africa	Orlando Pirates	1–1	ES Sahel	Tunisia	Orlando Stadium, Johannesburg	
2015	South Africa	Orlando Pirates	0–1	ES Sahel	Tunisia	Stade Olympique de Sousse, Sousse	
2015	ES Sahel won 2–1 on aggregate						
2016	Algeria	MO Béjaïa	1–1	TP Mazembe	DR Congo	Stade Mustapha Tchaker, Blida	30,000
2016	Algeria	MO Béjaïa	1–4	TP Mazembe	DR Congo	Stade TP Mazembe, Lubumbashi	18,000
2016	TP Mazembe won 5–2 on aggregate						
2017	DR Congo	TP Mazembe	2–1	SuperSport United	South Africa	Stade TP Mazembe, Lubumbashi	19,000
2017	DR Congo	TP Mazembe	0–0	SuperSport United	South Africa	Masterpieces, Pretoria	15,000
2017	TP Mazembe won 2–1 on aggregate						
2018	Morocco	Raja CA	3–0	AS Vita Club	DR Congo	Stade Mohammed V, Casablanca	45,000
2018	Morocco	Raja CA	1–3	AS Vita Club	DR Congo	Stade des Martyrs, Kinshasa	75,000
2018	Raja CA won 4–3 on aggregate						
2018–19	Morocco	RS Berkane	1–0	Zamalek SC	Egypt	Stade Municipal de Berkane, Berkane	13,000
2018–19	Morocco	RS Berkane	0–1	Zamalek SC	Egypt	Borg El Arab Stadium, Alexandria	70,000
2018–19	Zamalek won 5–3 on penalties (1–1 on aggregate)						
Single match format
Season	Winner		Score	Runner-up		Venue	Attendance
Season	Nation	Club	Score	Club	Nation	Venue	Attendance
2019–20	Morocco	RS Berkane	1–0	Pyramids	Egypt	Prince Moulay Abdellah Stadium, Rabat	0 (Note: The 2020 final match played behind closed doors due to the COVID-19 pandemic in Morocco.)
2020–21	Morocco	Raja CA	2–1	JS Kabylie	Algeria	Stade de l'Amitié, Cotonou	0 (Note: The 2021 final match played behind closed doors due to the COVID-19 pandemic in Benin.)
2021–22	Morocco	RS Berkane	1–1 (5–4 p)	Orlando Pirates	South Africa	Godswill Akpabio International Stadium, Uyo	—
Two-legged format
Season	Home		Score	Away		Venue	Attendance
Season	Nation	Club	Score	Club	Nation	Venue	Attendance
2022–23	Tanzania	Young Africans	1–2	USM Alger	Algeria	National Stadium, Dar es Salaam	60,000
2022–23	Tanzania	Young Africans	1–0	USM Alger	Algeria	Stade du 5 Juillet, Algiers	64,000
2022–23	USM Alger won on away goals (2–2 on aggregate)						
2023–24	Morocco	RS Berkane	2–1	Zamalek	Egypt	Stade Municipal de Berkane, Berkane	10,000
2023–24	Morocco	RS Berkane	0–1	Zamalek	Egypt	Cairo International Stadium, Cairo	52,000
2023–24	Zamalek won on away goals (2–2 on aggregate)						
2024–25	Morocco	RS Berkane	2–0	Simba	Tanzania	Stade Municipal de Berkane, Berkane	10,000
2024–25	Morocco	RS Berkane	1–1	Simba	Tanzania	Amaan Stadium, Zanzibar City	15,000
2024–25	Berkane won 3–1 on aggregate						
2025–26	Algeria	USM Alger	0–1	Zamalek	Egypt	Stade du 5 Juillet, Algiers	50,000
2025–26	Algeria	USM Alger	1–0	Zamalek	Egypt	Cairo International Stadium, Cairo	
2025–26	USM Alger won 8–7 on penalties (1–1 on aggregate)						

== Performances ==
=== By club ===
Performance in the CAF Confederation Cup by club
Club	Titles	Runners-up	Seasons won	Seasons runners-up
(Morocco) RS Berkane	3	2	2020, 2022, 2025	2019, 2024
(Tunisia) CS Sfaxien	3	1	2007, 2008, 2013	2010
(Tunisia) Étoile du Sahel	2	1	2006, 2015	2008
(Democratic Republic of the Congo) TP Mazembe	2	1	2016, 2017	2013
(Egypt) Zamalek	2	1	2019, 2024	2026
(Morocco) Raja CA	2	0	2018, 2021	
(Algeria) USM Alger	2	0	2023, 2026	
(Morocco) FAR Rabat	1	1	2005	2006
(Ghana) Hearts of Oak	1	0	2004	
(Mali) Stade Malien	1	0	2009	
(Morocco) FUS Rabat	1	0	2010	
(Morocco) MAS Fez	1	0	2011	
(Republic of the Congo) AC Léopards	1	0	2012	
(Egypt) Al Ahly	1	0	2014	
(South Africa) Orlando Pirates	0	2		2015, 2022
(Ghana) Asante Kotoko	0	1		2004
(Nigeria) Dolphins FC	0	1		2005
(Sudan) Al-Merrikh	0	1		2007
(Algeria) ES Sétif	0	1		2009
(Tunisia) Club Africain	0	1		2011
(Mali) Djoliba AC	0	1		2012
(Ivory Coast) Séwé Sport	0	1		2014
(Algeria) MO Béjaïa	0	1		2016
(South Africa) SuperSport United	0	1		2017
(Democratic Republic of the Congo) AS Vita Club	0	1		2018
(Egypt) Pyramids	0	1		2020
(Algeria) JS Kabylie	0	1		2021
(Tanzania) Young Africans	0	1		2023
(Tanzania) Simba	0	1		2025

=== By nation ===
Performance by nation
Nation	Winners	Runners-up
Morocco	8	3
Tunisia	5	3
Egypt	3	2
Algeria	2	3
DR Congo	2	2
Ghana	1	1
Mali	1	1
Congo	1	0
South Africa	0	3
Tanzania	0	2
Ivory Coast	0	1
Nigeria	0	1
Sudan	0	1
