= 2012 CAF Confederation Cup =

International football competition in Africa

Tournament details
- Dates: 18 February – 25 November 2012
- Teams: 48+8 (from 37 associations)

Final positions
- Champions: (Republic of the Congo) AC Léopards (1st title)
- Runners-up: (Mali) Djoliba

Tournament statistics
- Matches played: 124
- Goals scored: 285 (2.3 per match)
- Top scorer(s): (Republic of the Congo) Rudy Ndey (Mali) Ismaïla Diarra (Zimbabwe) Edward Sadomba (5 goals)

The 2012 CAF Confederation Cup (also known as the 2012 Orange CAF Confederation Cup for sponsorship reasons) was the 9th edition of the CAF Confederation Cup, Africa's secondary club football competition organized by the Confederation of African Football (CAF).

AC Léopards from the Republic of the Congo won their first title, defeating Djoliba from Mali with a 4–3 win on aggregate in the final. They earned the right to play in the 2013 CAF Super Cup.

== Association team allocation ==
Theoretically, up to 55 CAF member associations may enter the 2012 CAF Confederation Cup, with the 12 highest ranked associations according to CAF 5-year ranking eligible to enter 2 teams in the competition. For this year's competition, CAF used 2006-10 5-Year ranking. As a result, a maximum of 67 teams could enter the tournament – although this level has never been reached.

=== Ranking system ===
CAF calculates points for each entrant association based on their clubs’ performance over the last 5 years in the CAF Champions League and CAF Confederation Cup, not taking into considering the running year. The criteria for points are the following:

	CAF Champions League	CAF Confederation Cup
Winner	5 points	4 points
Runner-up	4 points	3 points
Losing semi-finalists	3 points	2 points
3rd place in groups	2 points	1 point
4th place in groups	1 point	1 point

The points are multiplied by a coefficient according to the year as follow:

- 2010 – 5
- 2009 – 4
- 2008 – 3
- 2007 – 2
- 2006 – 1

=== Entrants list ===
Below is the entrants list for the competition. Nations are shown according to their 2006–2010 CAF 5-year ranking – those with a ranking score have their rank and score indicated. Teams were also seeded using their individual 2007–2011 5-Year team Ranking. The top sixteen sides (shown in bold) received byes to the first qualifying round.

Association	Club	Qualifying method
Associations with two entrants (Ranked 1–12)
Tunisia (1st - 97 pts)	**CS Sfaxien**	2010–11 Tunisian Ligue Professionnelle 1 third place
Tunisia (1st - 97 pts)	**Club Africain**	2010–11 Tunisian Ligue Professionnelle 1 fourth place
Egypt (2nd - 81 pts)	**ENPPI** (one entrant only)	2010–11 Egypt Cup winner
(Democratic Republic of the Congo) Congo DR (3rd - 60 pts)	**Saint Eloi Lupopo**	2011 Linafoot third place
(Democratic Republic of the Congo) Congo DR (3rd - 60 pts)	**US Tshinkunku**	2011 Coupe du Congo winner
Nigeria (4th - 58 pts)	**Warri Wolves**	2010–11 Nigeria Premier League third place
Nigeria (4th - 58 pts)	**Heartland**	2011 Nigerian FA Cup winner
Sudan (5th - 47 pts)	**Alamal Atbara**	2011 Sudan Premier League third place
Sudan (5th - 47 pts)	**Al-Ahly Shendi**	2011 Sudan Premier League fourth place
Algeria (6th - 45 pts)	**ES Sétif** (one entrant only)	2010–11 Algerian Ligue Professionnelle 1 third place
Morocco (7th - 27 pts)	**Wydad AC**	2010–11 Botola third place
Morocco (7th - 27 pts)	**CODM Meknès**	2011 Coupe du Trône runner-up
Mali (8th - 21 pts)	**AS Real Bamako**	2010–11 Malian Première Division third place
Mali (8th - 21 pts)	**Cercle Olympique de Bamako**	2011 Malian Cup winner
Zimbabwe (9th - 18 pts)	Motor Action	2011 Zimbabwe Premier Soccer League third place
Zimbabwe (9th - 18 pts)	Hwange	2011 Zimbabwe Premier Soccer League fourth place
Cameroon (11th - 14 pts)	Union Douala	2010–11 Cameroonian Premier League third place
Cameroon (11th - 14 pts)	Unisport Bafang	2011 Cameroonian Cup runner-up
Ivory Coast (=12th - 13 pts)^{†}	Séwé Sports	2011 Côte d'Ivoire Premier Division third place
Ivory Coast (=12th - 13 pts)^{†}	**ASEC Mimosas**	2011 Coupe de Côte d'Ivoire de football winner
Associations with one entrant (Fewer ranking points than the 12th CAF association)
Angola (=12th - 13 pts)^{†}	**Interclube**	2011 Angola Cup winner
Zambia (=12th - 13 pts)^{†}	Red Arrows	2011 Zambian Premier League runner-up
Ghana (15th - 6 pts)	Nania	2010–11 Ghanaian FA Cup winner
Niger (=16th - 5 pts)	Sahel SC	2011 Niger Cup winner
South Africa (=16th - 5 pts)	Black Leopards	2011 Nedbank Cup runner-up
Equatorial Guinea (18th - 1 pt)	Atlético Semu	2011 Equatoguinean Cup winner
Benin	Dragons	2011 Benin Cup winner
Botswana	Extension Gunners	2011 Botswana FA Challenge Cup winner
Burkina Faso	Étoile Filante	2011 Coupe du Faso winner
Burundi	LLB Académic	2011 Burundian Cup winner
Central African Republic	AS Tempête Mocaf	2011 Central African Republic Coupe Nationale winner
Chad	Renaissance	2011 Coupe de Ligue de N'Djaména winner
(Republic of the Congo) Congo	AC Léopards	2011 Coupe du Congo winner
Ethiopia	Saint George SA	2010–11 Ethiopian Cup winner
Gabon	AS Mangasport	2011 Coupe du Gabon Interclubs winner
(The Gambia) Gambia	Gamtel	2011 Gambian Cup winner
Guinea	FC Séquence	2011 Guinée Coupe Nationale winner
Guinea-Bissau	ADR Desportivo de Mansabá	2011 Taça Nacional da Guiné Bissau winner
Kenya	Gor Mahia	2011 FKL Cup winner
Liberia	Invincible Eleven	2011 Liberian Cup winner
Madagascar	Tana Formation	2011 Coupe de Madagascar runner-up
Mozambique	Ferroviário de Maputo	2011 Taça de Moçambique winner
Rwanda	Kiyovu Sports	2010–11 Rwandan Premier League runner-up
Senegal	Casa Sport	2011 Senegal FA Cup winner
Sierra Leone	FC Kallon	2011 Sierra Leone National Premier League runner-up
(Eswatini) Swaziland	Royal Leopards	2011 Swazi Cup winner
Tanzania	Simba	2010–11 Tanzanian Premier League runner-up
Zanzibar	Jamhuri	2011 Zanzibar Premier League runner-up

Notes

- Associations that did not enter a team: Libya (seeded 10th with 16 ranking points and entitled to two entrants), Cape Verde, Comoros, Djibouti, Eritrea, Lesotho, Malawi, Mauritania, Mauritius, Namibia, Réunion, São Tomé and Príncipe, Seychelles, Somalia, Togo, Uganda
- ^{†} According to the formula for calculating the CAF 5-year ranking, Angola, Ivory Coast and Zambia are tied 12th place with 13 ranking points. As stated in local media reports, Ivory Coast have two entrants, while Angola and Zambia have one entrant.
- Unranked associations have no ranking points and hence are equal 19th.

Moreover, eight losers from the 2012 CAF Champions League second round entered the play-off round:

- (Cameroon) Coton Sport
- (Ivory Coast) AFAD Djékanou
- (Mali) Djoliba
- (Mali) Stade Malien
- (Morocco) Maghreb de Fès
- (Sudan) Al-Hilal
- (Sudan) Al-Merreikh
- (Zimbabwe) Dynamos

== Round and draw dates ==
Schedule of dates for 2012 competition.

Phase	Round	Draw date	First leg	Second leg
Qualifying	Preliminary round	9 December 2011 (Cairo, Egypt)	17–19 February	2–4 March
Qualifying	First round	9 December 2011 (Cairo, Egypt)	23–25 March	6–8 April
Qualifying	Second round (1st Round of 16)	9 December 2011 (Cairo, Egypt)	27–29 April	11–13 May
Qualifying	Play-off round (2nd Round of 16)	15 May 2012 (Cairo, Egypt)	29 June–1 July	13–15 July
Group stage	Matchday 1	15 May 2012 (Cairo, Egypt)	3–5 August	
Group stage	Matchday 2	15 May 2012 (Cairo, Egypt)	17–19 August	
Group stage	Matchday 3	15 May 2012 (Cairo, Egypt)	31 August–2 September	
Group stage	Matchday 4	15 May 2012 (Cairo, Egypt)	14–16 September	
Group stage	Matchday 5	15 May 2012 (Cairo, Egypt)	5–7 October	
Group stage	Matchday 6	15 May 2012 (Cairo, Egypt)	19–21 October	
Knock-out stage	Semifinals	15 May 2012 (Cairo, Egypt)	2–4 November	9–11 November
Knock-out stage	Final	15 May 2012 (Cairo, Egypt)	16–18 November	23–25 November

== Qualifying rounds ==
The fixtures for the preliminary, first and second qualifying rounds were announced on 9 December 2011.

Qualification ties were decided over two legs, with aggregate goals used to determine the winner. If the sides were level on aggregate after the second leg, the away goals rule was applied, and if still level, the tie proceeded directly to a penalty shootout (no extra time was played).

=== Preliminary round ===
Team 1	Agg.	Team 2	1st leg	2nd leg
Dragons (Benin)	1–2	(Burkina Faso) Étoile Filante	1–0	0–2
Nania (Ghana)	w/o^{1}	(Guinea) FC Séquence	—	—
Union Douala (Cameroon)	1–2	(Sierra Leone) FC Kallon	1–0	0–2
Black Leopards (South Africa)	3–1	(Zimbabwe) Motor Action	1–1	2–0
Red Arrows (Zambia)	0–1	(Eswatini) Royal Leopards	0–0	0–1
AS Mangasport (Gabon)	0–5	(Ethiopia) Saint George SA	0–1	0–4
Kiyovu Sports (Rwanda)	2–3	(Tanzania) Simba	1–1	1–2
Ferroviário de Maputo (Mozambique)	4–0	(Kenya) Gor Mahia	3–0	1–0
Séwé Sports (Ivory Coast)	0–1	(Cameroon) Unisport Bafang	0–1	0–0
AC Léopards (Republic of the Congo)	4–2	(Central African Republic) AS Tempête Mocaf	2–0	2–2
LLB Académic (Burundi)	5–0	(Equatorial Guinea) Atlético Semu	3–0	2–0
Renaissance (Chad)	4–2	(Niger) Sahel SC	2–0	2–2
ADR Desportivo de Mansabá (Guinea-Bissau)	w/o^{2}	(Liberia) Invincible Eleven	—	—
Gamtel (The Gambia)	1–1 (4–3 p)	(Senegal) Casa Sport	1–0	0–1
Extension Gunners (Botswana)	2–3	(Madagascar) Tana Formation	2–1	0–2
Jamhuri (Zanzibar)	1–7	(Zimbabwe) Hwange	0–3	1–4

Notes

- Note 1: FC Séquence advanced to the first round after Nania withdrew.
- Note 2: Invincible Eleven advanced to the first round after ADR Desportivo de Mansabá withdrew.

=== First round ===
Team 1	Agg.	Team 2	1st leg	2nd leg
Étoile Filante (Burkina Faso)	2–4	(Ivory Coast) ASEC Mimosas	2–2	0–2
FC Séquence (Guinea)	0–5	(Morocco) CODM Meknès	0–2	0–3
FC Kallon (Sierra Leone)	0–2	(Nigeria) Warri Wolves	0–0	0–2
Black Leopards (South Africa)	6–4	(Democratic Republic of the Congo) Saint Eloi Lupopo	4–2	2–2
Royal Leopards (Eswatini)	3–2	(Democratic Republic of the Congo) US Tshinkunku	1–1	2–1
Saint George SA (Ethiopia)	1–3	(Tunisia) Club Africain	1–1	0–2
Simba (Tanzania)	3–3 (a)	(Algeria) ES Sétif	2–0	1–3
Ferroviário de Maputo (Mozambique)	0–3	(Sudan) Al-Ahly Shendi	0–1	0–2
Unisport Bafang (Cameroon)	1–2	(Nigeria) Heartland	0–0	1–2
AC Léopards (Republic of the Congo)	3–2	(Tunisia) CS Sfaxien	1–2	2–0
LLB Académic (Burundi)	2–5	(Egypt) ENPPI	1–1	1–4
Renaissance (Chad)	4–5	(Mali) Cercle Olympique de Bamako	3–2	1–3
Invincible Eleven (Liberia)	1–6	(Morocco) Wydad AC	0–2	1–4
Gamtel (The Gambia)	2–3	(Mali) AS Real Bamako	1–0	1–3
Tana Formation (Madagascar)	2–2 (5–6 p)	(Angola) Interclube	2–0	0–2
Hwange (Zimbabwe)	1–1 (a)	(Sudan) Alamal Atbara	1–1	0–0

=== Second round ===
Team 1	Agg.	Team 2	1st leg	2nd leg
ASEC Mimosas (Ivory Coast)	1–1 (a)	(Morocco) CODM Meknès	1–1	0–0
Warri Wolves (Nigeria)	3–3 (a)	(South Africa) Black Leopards	3–1	0–2
Royal Leopards (Eswatini)	2–5	(Tunisia) Club Africain	0–1	2–4
Simba (Tanzania)	3–3 (8–9 p)	(Sudan) Al-Ahly Shendi	3–0	0–3
Heartland (Nigeria)	4–4 (a)	(Republic of the Congo) AC Léopards	3–2	1–2
ENPPI (Egypt)	3–4	(Mali) Cercle Olympique de Bamako	3–1	0–3
Wydad AC (Morocco)	3–1	(Mali) AS Real Bamako	3–0	0–1
Interclube (Angola)	6–1	(Sudan) Alamal Atbara	4–1	2–0

=== Play-off round ===
In the play-off round, the winners from the second round played against the losers from the 2012 CAF Champions League second round. The winners of the CAF Confederation Cup second round hosted the second leg at home.

The draw for the play-off round and group stage was held on 15 May 2012. For the play-off round draw, two teams were seeded (using their individual 2007–2011 5-Year team Ranking), and for the group stage draw, the winners of the play-off round ties involving them were seeded into Pot 1, and the winners of the remaining ties were seeded into Pot 2. Each group contained one team from Pot 1 and three teams from Pot 2.

Team 1	Agg.	Team 2	1st leg	2nd leg
Maghreb de Fès (Morocco)	1–2	(Republic of the Congo) AC Léopards	1–0	0–2
Al-Hilal (Sudan)	3–0	(Mali) Cercle Olympique de Bamako	2–0	1–0
AFAD Djékanou (Ivory Coast)	0–1	(Morocco) Wydad AC	0–1	0–0
Al-Merreikh (Sudan)	3–2	(South Africa) Black Leopards	3–2	0–0
Djoliba (Mali)	2–2 (4–3 p)	(Tunisia) Club Africain	2–0	0–2
Dynamos (Zimbabwe)	0–1	(Angola) Interclube	0–0	0–1
Stade Malien (Mali)	4–1	(Morocco) CODM Meknès	3–0	1–1
Coton Sport (Cameroon)	1–2	(Sudan) Al-Ahly Shendi	1–0	0–2

== Group stage ==
The matchdays were 3–5 August, 17–19 August, 31 August–2 September, 14–16 September, 5–7 October, and 19–21 October.

Key to colours in group tables
Group winners and runners-up advance to the Semifinals

=== Group A ===
Team	Pld	W	D	L	GF	GA	GD	Pts
(Sudan) Al-Merreikh	6	4	2	0	8	3	+5	14
(Sudan) Al-Hilal	6	3	2	1	11	6	+5	11
(Angola) Interclube	6	1	2	3	3	7	−4	5
(Sudan) Al-Ahly Shendi	6	1	0	5	3	9	−6	3

	AHL	HIL	MER	INT
Al-Ahly Shendi	—	1–2	0–1	1–2
Al-Hilal	2–0	—	1–1	3–0
Al-Merreikh	2–0	3–2	—	1–0
Interclube	0–1	1–1	0–0	—

=== Group B ===
Team	Pld	W	D	L	GF	GA	GD	Pts
(Mali) Djoliba	6	4	1	1	9	7	+2	13
(Republic of the Congo) AC Léopards	6	2	3	1	8	6	+2	9
(Morocco) Wydad AC	6	1	3	2	10	10	0	6
(Mali) Stade Malien	6	0	3	3	6	10	−4	3

	LEO	DJO	SMA	WAC
AC Léopards	—	3–0	1–0	1–1
Djoliba	1–1	—	2–1	2–1
Stade Malien	1–1	0–2	—	3–3
Wydad AC	3–1	1–2	1–1	—

== Knock-out stage ==
=== Bracket ===
Semi-Finals
1	(Sudan) Al-Hilal	2	0	2 (6)
4	(Mali) Djoliba (p)	0	2	2 (7)
3	(Republic of the Congo) AC Léopards	2	0	2
2	(Sudan) Al-Merrikh	1	0	1

Final
(Mali) Djoliba	2	1	3
(Republic of the Congo) AC Léopards	2	2	4

=== Semifinals ===
Team 1	Agg.	Team 2	1st leg	2nd leg
Al-Hilal (Sudan)	2–2 (6–7 p)	(Mali) Djoliba	2–0	0–2
AC Léopards (Republic of the Congo)	2–1	(Sudan) Al-Merrikh	2–1	0–0

=== Final ===
18 November 2012
20:00 UTC±00:00

Djoliba (Mali)	2–2	(Republic of the Congo) AC Léopards
Bagayoko 36' (pen.); S. Coulibaly 74'	Report	Kivouri 22'; Ngouelou 87'

Stade Modibo Kéïta, Bamako
Referee: Daniel Bennett (South Africa)
25 November 2012
15:30 UTC+01:00

AC Léopards (Republic of the Congo)	2–1	(Mali) Djoliba
Gandzé 24'; Ndey 45'	Report	S. Coulibaly 34'

Stade Denis Sassou Nguesso, Dolisie
Referee: Néant Alioum (Cameroon)

AC Léopards won 4–3 on aggregate.

== Top scorers ==
Rank	Player	Club	Goals
1	(Republic of the Congo) Rudy Ndey	(Republic of the Congo) AC Léopards	5
1	(Mali) Ismaïla Diarra	(Mali) Cercle Olympique de Bamako	5
1	(Zimbabwe) Edward Sadomba	(Sudan) Al-Hilal	5
4	(Angola) Moco	(Angola) Interclube	4
4	(Burundi) Abdul Razak Fiston	(Burundi) LLB Académic	4
4	(Ethiopia) Adane Girma	(Ethiopia) Saint George SA	4
4	(Mali) Alou Bagayoko	(Mali) Djoliba	4
4	(Sudan) Mudather El Tahir	(Sudan) Al-Hilal	4
4	(Sudan) Ahmed El-Basha	(Sudan) Al-Merreikh	4
4	(Chad) Ezechiel Ndouassel	(Tunisia) Club Africain	4

== See also ==
- 2012 CAF Champions League
- 2013 CAF Super Cup
