= 2013 CAF Super Cup =

2013 Orange CAF Super Cup
Al-Ahly	AC Léopards
(Egypt)	(Republic of the Congo)
2	1
- Date: 23 February 2013
- Venue: Borg El Arab Stadium, Alexandria
- Referee: Bakary Gassama (Gambia)

The 2013 CAF Super Cup (also known as the 2013 Orange CAF Super Cup for sponsorship reasons) was the 21st CAF Super Cup, an annual football match in Africa organized by the Confederation of African Football (CAF), between the winners of the previous season's two CAF club competitions, the CAF Champions League and the CAF Confederation Cup.

The match was contested between Al-Ahly of Egypt, the 2012 CAF Champions League winner, and AC Léopards of the Republic of the Congo, the 2012 CAF Confederation Cup winner. It was hosted by Al-Ahly at the Borg El Arab Stadium in Alexandria on 23 February 2013.

Al-Ahly won the match 2–1 to claim their 5th CAF Super Cup.

== Teams ==
Team	Qualification	Previous participation (bold indicates winners)
(Egypt) Al-Ahly	2012 CAF Champions League winner	1994, **2002**, **2006**, **2007**, **2009**
(Republic of the Congo) AC Léopards	2012 CAF Confederation Cup winner	None

== Rules ==
The CAF Super Cup was played as a single match, with the CAF Champions League winner hosting the match. If the score was tied at the end of regulation, the penalty shoot-out was used to determine the winner (no extra time was played).

== Match ==
23 February 2013
18:30 UTC+2

Al-Ahly (Egypt)	2–1	(Republic of the Congo) AC Léopards
Rabia 55'; Barakat 70'	Report	Ndey 77'

Borg El Arab Stadium, Alexandria
Attendance: 10,000
Referee: Bakary Gassama (Gambia)

**Al-Ahly**	**AC Léopards**

GK	1	(Egypt) Sherif Ekramy
DF	4	(Egypt) Sherif Abdel-Fadil
DF	6	(Egypt) Wael Gomaa (c)
DF	23	(Egypt) Mohamed Nagieb
DF	12	(Egypt) Ahmad Shedid Qinawi
MF	8	(Egypt) Mohamed Barakat	(yellow card) 15'	(substituted off) 88'
MF	25	(Egypt) Hossam Ashour
MF	3	(Egypt) Ramy Rabia
MF	19	(Egypt) Abdallah El-Said
FW	18	(Egypt) Elsayed Hamdi		(substituted off) 80'
FW	21	(Egypt) Ahmed Abd El-Zaher		(substituted off) 59'
Substitutes:
FW	9	(Egypt) Emad Moteab	(yellow card) 90'	(substituted on) 59'
MF	27	(Egypt) Mahmoud Trézéguet		(substituted on) 80'
DF	2	(Egypt) Saad Samir		(substituted on) 88'
GK	13	(Egypt) Ahmed Adel Abdel Moneam
MF	10	(Egypt) Ahmed Shoukry
FW	26	(Mauritania) Dominique Da Silva
DF	30	(Egypt) Shehab El-Din Ahmed
Manager:
(Egypt) Hossam El-Badry

GK	22	(Republic of the Congo) Gildas Kiwoko Mouyabi
DF	4	(Republic of the Congo) Chancel Gombessa
DF	5	(Republic of the Congo) Boris Moubhio Ngonga
DF	15	(Republic of the Congo) Childran Djodjo Miangounina
DF	6	(Republic of the Congo) Dimitri Bissiki
MF	14	(Republic of the Congo) Chardin Madila Mfoutou		(substituted off) 68'
MF	18	(Republic of the Congo) Prestone Lakolo
MF	8	(Republic of the Congo) Rochel Kivouri	(yellow card) 32'	(substituted off) 56'
MF	10	(Democratic Republic of the Congo) Tychique Ntela Kalema
MF	17	(Republic of the Congo) Bienvenue Kombo	(yellow card) 42'	(substituted off) 71'
FW	7	(Republic of the Congo) Rudy Ndey
Substitutes:
MF	28	(Republic of the Congo) Junior Makiese Mouzita		(substituted on) 56'
DF	12	(Republic of the Congo) Césaire Gandzé		(substituted on) 68'
FW	19	(Republic of the Congo) Héritier Ngouelou		(substituted on) 71'
GK	16	(Republic of the Congo) Chancel Massa
DF	2	(Republic of the Congo) Ulrich Nzamba Mombo
MF	26	(Republic of the Congo) Carof Bakoua
MF	24	(Republic of the Congo) Charlin Bouetoutelahio
Manager:
(Cameroon) Joseph Marius Omog

Assistant referees:
Angesom Ogbamariam (Eritrea)
Félicien Kabanda (Rwanda)
Fourth official:
Maudo Jallow (Gambia)
