= Bobe =

Bobe may refer to:

- Bobè, Benin
- Bubi people or Bobe, a Bantu ethnic group of Central Africa
- Bube language or Bobe, a Bantu language spoken by the Bubi people
- Nickname of Robert Cannon

== People with the surname ==
- T. O. Bobe (born 1969), Romanian poet
- Mongezi Bobe (born 1981), South African footballer
