= Zargo Touré =

Senegalese footballer (born 1989)

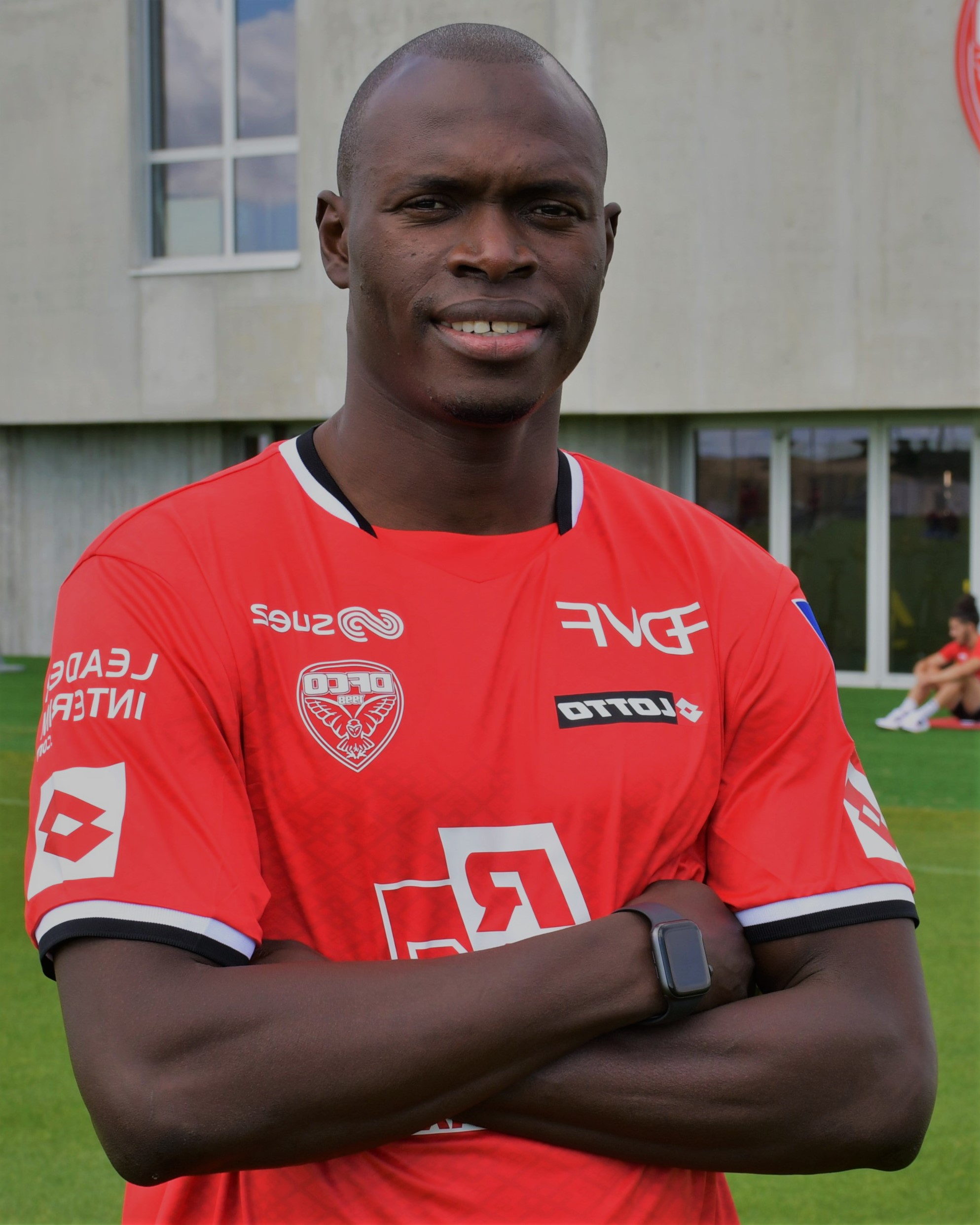
- Touré with Dijon in 2022

Personal information
- Date of birth: 11 November 1989 (age 37)
- Place of birth: Pikine, Senegal
- Height: 1.85 m (6 ft 1 in)
- Position: Midfielder

Team information
- Current team: Çorum
- Number: 5

Youth career
- Sporting Dakar

Senior career*
Years	Team	Apps	(Gls)
2008–2013	Boulogne	111	(2)
2012–2013	→ Le Havre (loan)	36	(0)
2013–2015	Le Havre	73	(0)
2015–2018	Lorient	76	(5)
2018–2019	Trabzonspor	27	(0)
2019–2021	Gençlerbirliği	55	(0)
2021–2023	Dijon	38	(2)
2023–	Çorum	67	(1)

International career^{‡}
2012	Senegal U23	4	(0)
2012–2017	Senegal	18	(0)
- * Club domestic league appearances and goals as of 15 June 2025 ‡ National team caps and goals as of 23 January 2017

Zargo Touré (born 11 November 1989) is a Senegalese professional footballer who plays as a midfielder for Turkish club Çorum.

== Club career ==
Touré was born in Pikine, Senegal. He began his career at homeland club Sporting Dakar in the Senegalese capital.

Touré joined US Boulogne in 2008, after interest from Olympique Marseille and En Avant Guingamp. He was assigned the number 29 shirt. He plays alongside compatriots Ibrahima Sané – whom he lived with, and Mame N'Diaye, who is on loan from Marseille.

On 31 August 2015, Touré joined the French Ligue 1 side Lorient from Le Havre. On 30 January 2016, he scored two goals against Reims in Lorient's 2–0 win . He was also the man of the match.

On 30 July 2018, Touré signed a three-year, 350.000 Euro to Turkey club Trabzonspor.

On 28 July 2021, he returned to France and signed a two-year contract with Dijon.

== International career ==
Zargo was named to the Senegalese Olympic team for the 2012 Summer Olympics in London. He made all four appearances in the tournament, reaching the quarterfinals.

Touré made his debut for Senegal in the 2013 Africa Cup of Nations qualification match against Ivory Coast.

== Personal life ==
Touré holds Senegalese and French nationalities.
