= Tsiba Moukassa =

Congolese footballer

Personal information
- Date of birth: 18 April 1992 (age 34)
- Place of birth: Congo
- Position: Midfielder

Team information
- Current team: AC Léopards

Senior career*
| Years | Team | Apps | (Gls) |
- AC Léopards
- * Club domestic league appearances and goals

Tsiba Moukassa is a Congolese professional footballer who plays as a midfielder for AC Léopards.

== International career ==
In January 2014, coach Claude Leroy, invited him to be a part of the Congo squad for the 2014 African Nations Championship. The team was eliminated in the group stages after losing to Ghana, drawing with Libya and defeating Ethiopia.
