= Chancel Massa =

Congolese footballer

Personal information
- Date of birth: 24 January 1985 (age 41)
- Place of birth: Congo
- Position: Goalkeeper

Team information
- Current team: AC Léopards

Senior career*
Years	Team	Apps	(Gls)
- AC Léopards
- * Club domestic league appearances and goals

Chancel Massa is a Congolese professional footballer, who plays as a goalkeeper for AC Léopards.

== International career ==
In January 2014, coach Claude Leroy invited him to be a part of the Congo squad for the 2014 African Nations Championship. The team was eliminated in the group stages after losing to Ghana, drawing with Libya and defeating Ethiopia.
