= 1990 WAFU Club Championship =

Tournament details
- Teams: 14 (from 1 confederation)

Final positions
- Champions: (Ivory Coast) ASEC Abidjan (1st title)
- Runners-up: (Mali) Djoliba AC

Tournament statistics
- Matches played: 18
- Goals scored: 41 (2.28 per match)

The 1990 WAFU Club Championship was the fourteenth football club tournament season that took place for the runners-up or third place of each West African country's domestic league, the West African Club Championship. It was won by Ivory Coast's ASEC Abidjan after defeating Djoliba AC in the first match 1–0 as the second had a goal draw. A total of about 45 goals were scored. Originally a 26 match season, it was reduced to a 22 match season as the Invincible Eleven withdrew during the quarterfinals and then Ranchers Bees during the semis, neither club from the Gambia nor Mauritania participated. Sporting Bissau was the only club who abandoned the tournament during the second match.

== Preliminary round ==
Team 1	Agg.	Team 2	1st leg	2nd leg
Ranchers Bees (Nigeria)	3–1	(Guinea) Horoya AC	3–0	1–0
Sporting Bissau (Guinea-Bissau)	1–4	(Ivory Coast) ASEC Abidjan	1–4	— (Note: Sporting Bissau abandoned the second match)
Okwahu United (Ghana)	3–2	(Nigeria) Plateau United	3–0	2–0
Sahel SC (Niger)	2–5	(Burkina Faso) EF Ouagadougou	1–3	2–1
ETICS Thiès (Senegal)	2–6	(Mali) Djoliba AC	0–3	3–2
Real Republicans (Sierra Leone)	0–0 (3–5 p)	(Liberia) Invincible Eleven	0–0	0–0

== Quarterfinals ==
Team 1	Agg.	Team 2	1st leg	2nd leg
Ifodje Atakpamé (Togo)	0–2	(Nigeria) Ranchers Bees	0–0	2–0
ASEC Abidjan (Ivory Coast)	5–0	(Burkina Faso) EF Ouagadougou	4–0	0–1
Okwahu United (Ghana)	(Note: The results of the two matches are unknown, but it ended in a penalty shootout as two clubs had the same goal totals)	(Mali) Djoliba AC	N/A	N/A

The match between Mogas 90 of Benin and the Invincible Eleven were not held as the Invincible Eleven withdrew.

== Semifinals ==
Team 1	Agg.	Team 2	1st leg	2nd leg
Mogas 90 (Benin)	0–2	(Ivory Coast) ASEC Abidjan	0–0	2–0

The matches between Djoliba AC and Ranchers Bees were cancelled as Ranchers Bees withdrew

== Finals ==
Team 1	Agg.	Team 2	1st leg	2nd leg
ASEC Abidjan (Ivory Coast)	2–0	(Mali) Djoliba AC	1–0	1–1

== Winners ==
1990 WAFU Club Championship
(Ivory Coast)
ASEC Abidjan
First title

== See also ==
- 1990 African Cup of Champions Clubs
- 1990 CAF Cup Winners' Cup
