= Gildas Kiwoko Mouyabi =

Congolese footballer

Gildas Mouyabi
Personal information
- Full name: Gildas Kiwoko Mouyabi
- Date of birth: 29 October 1986 (age 40)
- Place of birth: Congo
- Position: Goalkeeper

Team information
- Current team: AC Léopards
- Number: 22

Gildas Kiwoko Mouyabi is a Congolese professional footballer who plays as a goalkeeper for AC Léopards.

== International career ==
In January 2014, coach Claude Leroy, invited him to be a part of the Congo squad for the 2014 African Nations Championship. The team was eliminated in the group stages after losing to Ghana, drawing with Libya and defeating Ethiopia.
