= Eric Asamoah-Frimpong =

Ghanaian footballer

Kari Kari
Personal information
- Full name: Eric Asamoah-Frimpong Karikari
- Date of birth: February 14, 1990 (age 36)
- Place of birth: Mampong Nsuta, Ashanti, Ghana
- Position: Midfielder

Team information
- Current team: Bayelsa United
- Number: 11

Youth career
- Enyimba

Senior career*
Years	Team	Apps	(Gls)
2008	Enyimba		
2009–2012	Étoile du Sahel	10	(1)
2010–2012	→ CS Hammam-Lif (loan)	18	(5)
2013	CS Hammam-Lif	6	(0)
2013–2014	Bayelsa United		
2016–2017	Al-Nassr FC		
2017–	Niger Tornadoes	4	(3)
- * Club domestic league appearances and goals

Eric Asamoah-Frimpong Karikari (born 14 February 1990 in Mampong Nsuta) is a Ghanaian professional footballer who plays for Nigerian side Niger Tornadoes.

== Career ==
Asamoah joined in November 2009 from Nigeria Premier League club Enyimba to Tunisian top club Étoile du Sahel and made short time later on 22 November 2009 his debut against Club Africain, in which he scored his first goal for his new club.

== Personal life ==
He is the younger brother of Joetex Asamoah Frimpong.
