= Mxolisi Mthethwa =

Liswati footballer

Personal information
- Full name: Mxolisi Mthethwa
- Date of birth: 18 September 1978 (age 48)
- Place of birth: Swaziland
- Position: Midfielder

Senior career*
Years	Team	Apps	(Gls)
2000–2004	Manzini Wanderers		
2004–	Royal Leopards		

International career
2000–	Swaziland	39	(1)
- * Club domestic league appearances and goals

Mxolisi Mthethwa (born 18 September 1978) is a Liswati former footballer who played as a midfielder.
