= Lansana Kamara =

Sierra Leonean footballer (born 1992)

Personal information
- Date of birth: 10 June 1992 (age 34)
- Place of birth: Freetown, Sierra Leone
- Height: 1.70 m (5 ft 7 in)
- Position: Midfielder

Senior career*
Years	Team	Apps	(Gls)
2009–2010	F.C. Kallon		
2011–2012	Eskilstuna City		
2013	Vimmerby		
2014	Umeå	21	(2)

International career^{‡}
2014–2015	Sierra Leone	3	(0)
- * Club domestic league appearances and goals as of 16:55, 23 April 2017 (UTC) ‡ National team caps and goals as of 16:55, 23 April 2017 (UTC)

Lansana Kamara (born 10 June 1992) is a Sierra Leonean international footballer who plays as a midfielder.

== Career ==
Born in Freetown, Kamara has played for F.C. Kallon, Eskilstuna City, Vimmerby and Umeå.

He made his international debut for Sierra Leone in 2014.
