= Ibrahima Sané =

Senegalese footballer

Personal information
- Full name: Ibrahima Simang Sané
- Date of birth: 11 November 1989 (age 37)
- Place of birth: Dakar, Senegal
- Height: 1.83 m (6 ft 0 in)
- Position: Forward

Youth career
- 2006–2008: SC Dakar

Senior career*
Years	Team	Apps	(Gls)
2008–2010	Boulogne	5	(1)
2009–2010	→ Toulon (loan)	2	(0)
2010–2012	Rodez	45	(2)
2012–2013	Al Hilal		
2014–2016	Roye-Noyon	13	(1)

International career
2007–2008	Senegal U19	8	(1)
- * Club domestic league appearances and goals

Ibrahima Simang Sané (born 11 November 1989) is a Senegalese former professional footballer who played as a forward.

== Career ==
Born in the Senegalese capital Dakar, Sané began to play in with Sporting Club de Dakar and moved in summer 2008 to France, who signed for Ligue 1 side US Boulogne and was loaned out to SC Toulon. He played alongside compatriots Zargo Touré - whom he lives with, and Mame N'Diaye, who was on loan from Marseille.
