= Gift Atulewa =

Nigerian footballer (1986–2024)

Personal information
- Date of birth: 1 April 1986
- Place of birth: Nigeria
- Date of death: 12 November 2024 (aged 38)
- Height: 1.83 m (6 ft 0 in)
- Position: Forward

Senior career*
Years	Team	Apps	(Gls)
2004–2006	Bayelsa United		
2006–2007	Ocean Boys		
2008–2016	Warri Wolves		

International career
2005	Nigeria U20	3	(0)
- * Club domestic league appearances and goals

Gift Atulewa (1 April 1986 – 12 November 2024) was a Nigerian footballer who played as a forward for Bayelsa United, Ocean Boys, and Warri Wolves.

== Club career ==
Atulewa began his career with Bayelsa United before moving in 2006 to Ocean Boys. After one season, he moved in July 2008 to Warri Wolves.

== International career ==
Atulewa was a member of the Nigeria U20 national team that took part in the 2005 FIFA World Youth Championship in Netherlands in which it was eliminated in the final by Argentina.

== Death ==
Atulewa died on 12 November 2024, at the age of 38, after suffering from hypertension. His wife died after an illness a month prior.

== Honours ==
- FIFA U-20 World Cup runner-up: 2005
