= Pape Seydou N'Diaye =

Senegalese footballer

Personal information
- Full name: Pape Seydou N'Diaye
- Date of birth: 11 February 1993 (age 33)
- Place of birth: Dakar, Senegal
- Height: 1.93 m (6 ft 4 in)
- Position: Goalkeeper

Team information
- Current team: Jammerbugt
- Number: 1

Youth career
- Yakaar
- Jokko
- AS Douanes
- Niarry Tally

Senior career*
Years	Team	Apps	(Gls)
2015–2018	Niarry Tally		
2018	Jaraaf		
2018–2019	Génération Foot		
2019–2021	Jaraaf		
2021–	Jammerbugt	14	(0)

International career^{‡}
2015	Senegal U23	5	(0)
2017–	Senegal	19	(0)
- * Club domestic league appearances and goals as of 20:15, 2 August 2022 (UTC) ‡ National team caps and goals as of 18:55, 7 November 2021 (UTC)

Pape Seydou N'Diaye (born 11 February 1993) is a Senegalese professional footballer who currently plays as a goalkeeper for Danish 2nd Division club Jammerbugt FC.

== Career ==
=== Club ===
Since 2012 N'Diaye has played in ASC Niarry Tally.

On 3 November 2021, N'Diaye joined Danish 1st Division club Jammerbugt FC on a deal until June 2023.

=== International ===
Following his selection for the Olympic Games, N'Diaye took part 2015 Africa U-23 Cup of Nations in his native country. Senegal came fourth in the tournament after losing the semifinals to Nigeria and the final for third place to South Africa.

N'Diaye played his first match for Senegal's senior team on 10 February 2016, in a friendly 2–0 defeat against Mexico in Miami. He took part in the 2017 Africa Cup of Nations which took place in Gabon.
