= Colliery Stadium =

Stadium in Birsinghpur, Madhya Pradesh, India

- Colliery Stadium
- Full name: Colliery Stadium
- Former names: Vinay Stadium
- Location: Birsinghpur, Madhya Pradesh, India
- Capacity: 5,000

Construction
- Groundbreaking: 1967
- Opened: 1967

Website
- ESPNcricinfo

Colliery Stadium is a multi purpose stadium in Birsinghpur, Madhya Pradesh, India. The ground is mainly used for organizing matches of football, cricket and other sports.

The stadium hosted four first-class matches from 1967 when Madhya Pradesh cricket team played against Vidarbha cricket team. until 1987 but since then the stadium has hosted non first-class cricket matches.
