= T. O. Bobe =

Romanian writer

- Born: February 13, 1969 (age 57); Romania
- Occupations: Poet, screenwriter
- Writing career
- Language: Romanian

T.O. Bobe (February 13, 1969, in Constanţa) is a Romanian poet and screenwriter for film and television.

== Life and career ==
He graduated in 1995 after studying literature at the University of Bucharest.

Between 1995 and 2003 he worked at the Teatrul Mic din București, where he began his work as a scriptwriter

He debuted with a poetry collection called Tablou de familie, published along with the poems of Mihai Ignat, Sorin Gherguţ, Răzvan Rădulescu, Svetlana Cârstean and Cezar Paul-Bădescu.

He also published the prose Darul lui Moş Crăciun in 2003 and Cum mi-am petrecut vacanţa de vară, in 2004.
