= Godfrey Moyo =

Zimbabwean footballer (born 1985)

Personal information
- Date of birth: 5 December 1985 (age 40)
- Position: Defender

Senior career*
Years	Team	Apps	(Gls)
2013–2015	Lengthens		
2012–2014	Motor Action		

International career^{‡}
2012–2013	Zimbabwe	3	(0)
- * Club domestic league appearances and goals as of 1 September 2020 ‡ National team caps and goals as of 1 September 2020

Godfrey Moyo (born 5 December 1985) is a retired Zimbabwean football defender.
