= Francis Ikechukwu =

Nigerian footballer

Personal information
- Full name: Francis Ikechukwu
- Date of birth: 26 September 1989 (age 37)
- Place of birth: Jos, Nigeria
- Height: 1.85 m (6 ft 1 in)
- Positions: Striker; winger

Team information
- Current team: Al-Ahly Shendi

Youth career
- Ecwa Development

Senior career*
Years	Team	Apps	(Gls)
2003–2007	Delta Force		
2007–2010	Khartoum FC		
2010–2011	→ Al-Ahly Shendi		
2014–2015	ASO Chilef		
2015–2016	Issa Town FC		

International career
2010–2012	Nigeria U-23	1	(0)
- * Club domestic league appearances and goals

Francis Ikechukwu (born 26 September 1989), is a Nigerian footballer who played for Al-Ahly Shendi as a striker.

== Club career ==
Born in Jos, Nigeria, Francis Ikechukwu grew up with well-known players from Jos such as John Obi Mikel and Obinna Nsofor. He began his career some local amateur sides Ecwa Development FC and Delta Force (both based in Delta State in Nigeria). He then went on trials in Sudan with other Nigerian players such as Malikh Isaac, for Khartoum FC, who were then playing in the Sudanese Second Division.

In 2008, he led Khartoum FC to the Sudanese Premier league and emerged as one of the top players in Sudan. His exploits drew the attention of another Sudanese club, Al-Ahly Shendi, who signed him after paying a transfer fee to Khartoum FC.

Francis led both teams into the African Confederations Cup, appearing 4 times successively. He is one of many Nigerian players who has played in Sudan over the years (other players from Nigeria were the late Endurance Idahor, Kelechi Osunwua, Stephen Worgu and Malik Isaac).

== International career ==
Francis Ikechukwu was a member of the Nigeria U-23 selection during the buildup to the 2012 Olympic Qualifiers, but was dropped from the squad.
