= Hamza Agrebi =

Tunisian footballer (born 1991)

Personal information
- Date of birth: 21 March 1991 (age 35)
- Place of birth: Tunis, Tunisia
- Height: 1.79 m (5 ft 10 in)
- Position: Defender

Team information
- Current team: Club Africain

Senior career*
| Years | Team | Apps | (Gls) |
| 2010– | Club Africain | 178 | (7) |

International career
| 2015 | Tunisia | 2 | (0) |
- * Club domestic league appearances and goals

Hamza Agrebi (born 21 March 1991) is a Tunisian footballer who plays as a defender.
