= Mongezi Bobe =

South African footballer

Personal information
- Date of birth: 16 May 1981 (age 45)
- Place of birth: Carletonville, South Africa
- Position: Midfielder

Team information
- Current team: Black Leopards

Youth career
- Kagiso Porto FC

Senior career*
Years	Team	Apps	(Gls)
2003–2004	Silver Stars	0	(0)
2003–2004	→ Mabopane Young Masters (loan)	?	(?)
2004–2006	Mabopane Young Masters	?	(?)
2006–2007	City Pillars	?	(?)
2007–2008	Mpumalanga Black Aces	?	(?)
2008–2013	Black Leopards	?	(?)
2013–2014	Free State Stars	?	(?)
2014–	Black Leopards	0	(0)
- * Club domestic league appearances and goals as of 8 July 2013 ‡ National team caps and goals as of 22 June 2012

Mongezi Bobe (born 16 May 1981 in Carletonville, Gauteng) is a South African soccer player who currently plays for Black Leopards in the Premier Soccer League.

He was a captain of Black Leopards, for which he played for five seasons. On 19 August 2014, he returned to the club after a difficult season at Free State Stars.
