= Yassine Lakhal =

Moroccan footballer

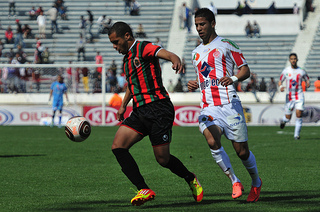
- Yassine Lakhal playing for Moghreb Tétouan

Personal information
- Date of birth: 5 May 1989 (age 37)
- Height: 1.80 m (5 ft 11 in)
- Position: Forward

Senior career*
Years	Team	Apps	(Gls)
2007–2011	Moghreb Tétouan	?	(?)
2011–2015	Wydad Casablanca	85	(11)
2015–2017	Moghreb Tétouan	42	(8)
2017	FAR Rabat	3	(0)
2018	Al Ahli Tripoli		
2018–2019	Chabab Rif Al Hoceima		
2019–2020	Al-Ain	8	(0)
2020–	Al-Arabi		

International career
2012	Morocco U23	15	(11)
- * Club domestic league appearances and goals

Yassine Lakhal is a Moroccan footballer who plays as a forward. He also played for the Moroccan Olympic national team.
