= Césaire Gandzé =

Congolese footballer

Personal information
- Full name: Césaire Dorlich Sydney Gandzé
- Date of birth: 6 March 1989 (age 37)
- Place of birth: Brazzaville, Congo
- Height: 1.81 m (5 ft 11 in)
- Position: Midfielder

Team information
- Current team: Étoile du Congo

Senior career*
Years	Team	Apps	(Gls)
2012–2018	AC Léopards		
2018–2019	Free State Stars	8	(1)
2019–2020	AS Otohô		
2020–	Étoile du Congo		

International career^{‡}
2011–2018	Congo	34	(1)
- * Club domestic league appearances and goals as of 1 April 2019 ‡ National team caps and goals as of 13:32, 26 December 2019 (UTC)

Césaire Dorlich Sydney Gandzé (born 6 March 1989) is a Congolese professional footballer who currently plays as a midfielder for Étoile du Congo.

== Club career ==
Gandzé joined South African club Free State Stars in the summer 2018. He was released by the club on 10 January 2019.

== International career ==
=== International goals ===
Scores and results list Congo's goal tally first.

No	Date	Venue	Opponent	Score	Result	Competition
1.	20 July 2014	Stade Municipal, Pointe-Noire, Congo	Rwanda	1–0	2–0	2015 Africa Cup of Nations qualification

== Honours ==
AC Léopards

- Congo Premier League: 2012, 2013, 2014
- CAF Confederation Cup: 2012
- CAF Super Cup runner-up: 2013
