= Estádio Joaquim Dinis =

Multi-use stadium in Angola

- Interactive map of Estádio Joaquim Dinis
- Address: Luanda; Angola
- Coordinates: 8°52′8″S 13°12′32″E
- Capacity: 7,800
- Type: Mulit-use
- Surface: Grass

Construction
- Built: 2003
- Renovated: 2005

Estádio Joaquim Dinis is a multi-use stadium in Luanda, Angola. It is currently used mostly for football matches and is the home ground of Atlético Sport Aviação. The stadium holds 7,800 people and was built in 2003.
