= Mame N'Diaye =

Senegalese footballer

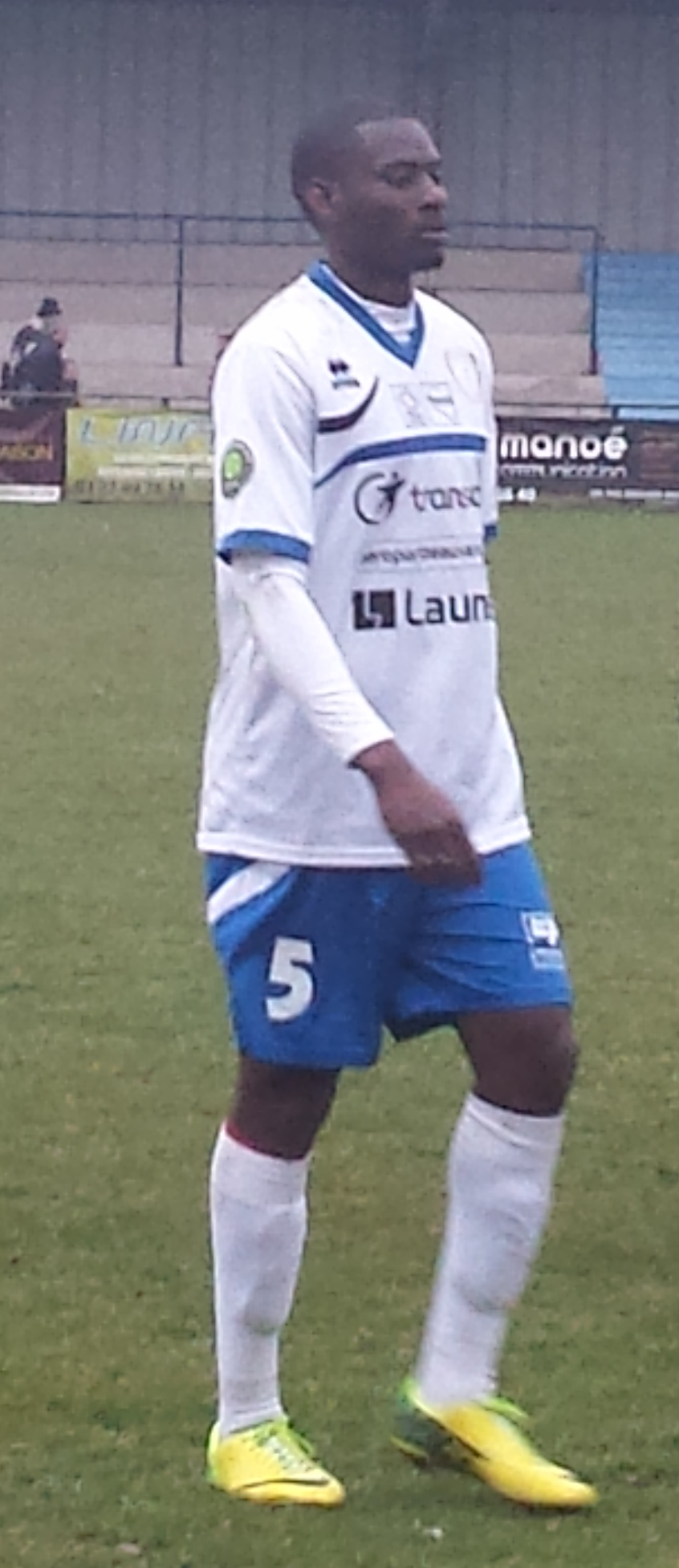
- N'Diaye in 2015

Personal information
- Full name: Mame Mamadou Mbengue N'Diaye
- Date of birth: 30 December 1986 (age 39)
- Place of birth: Thiès, Senegal
- Height: 1.77 m (5 ft 10 in)
- Position: Left-back

Youth career
- 2004–2005: Marseille

Senior career*
Years	Team	Apps	(Gls)
2005–2008	Marseille	1	(0)
2008	→ Libourne (loan)	16	(0)
2008–2010	Boulogne	22	(1)
2011–2012	Bayonne	0	(0)
2012–2013	AC Amiens	15	(2)
2013–2015	Beauvais	50	(0)
2015–2017	Roye-Noyon	13	(0)
Total		117	(3)
- * Club domestic league appearances and goals

Mame Mamadou Mbengue N'Diaye (born 30 December 1986) is a Senegalese former professional footballer who played as a left-back. He spent the entirety of his playing career in France, representing Marseille, Libourne, Boulogne, AC Amiens, Beauvais, and Roye-Noyon.
