= Salif Coulibaly =

Malian footballer

Personal information
- Full name: Salif Coulibaly
- Date of birth: 13 May 1988 (age 38)
- Place of birth: Bamako, Mali
- Height: 1.90 m (6 ft 3 in)
- Position: Central defender

Team information
- Current team: Horoya AC

Senior career*
Years	Team	Apps	(Gls)
2008–2012	Djoliba		
2012–2013	Esteghlal Khuzestan	27	(2)
2013–2018	TP Mazembe		
2018–2019	Al Ahly	9	(1)
2019	Raja CA	0	(0)
2020–	Horoya AC		

International career^{‡}
2012–	Mali	29	(1)
- * Club domestic league appearances and goals as of 21 May 2019 ‡ National team caps and goals as of 08:33, 17 June 2019 (UTC)

Salif Coulibaly (born 13 May 1988) is a Malian footballer who plays for Horoya AC, as a central defender.

== Club career ==
Born in Bamako, Coulibaly has played for Djoliba, Esteghlal Khuzestan, TP Mazembe and Al Ahly. In January he was set to move to Iraqi club Al-Shorta, but the move was called off.

== International career ==
Coulibaly made his international debut for Mali in 2012.
