= Ahmed El-Basha =

Sudanese football defender

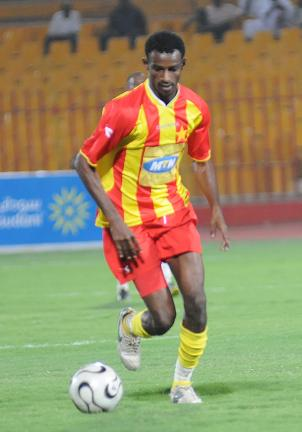

Personal information
- Full name: Ahmed El-Basha Mohamed Adam
- Date of birth: January 2, 1982 (age 44)
- Place of birth: Omdurman, Khartoum State, Sudan
- Position: Defensive midfielder

Senior career*
Years	Team	Apps	(Gls)
2000–2003	Al-Hurya SC (Omdurman)		
2003–2004	Al-Hilal Club		
2005–2007	Hilal Alsahil SC		
2008–2015	Al-Merreikh SC		
2010	Al-Nasr SC (Benghazi) (Loan)		
2016	Busaiteen Club		
2016–2017	East Riffa Club		
2017	Al Rabita Kosti		

International career^{‡}
2007–2012	Sudan	34	(1)
Medal record
Men's football
Representing Sudan
African Nations Championship
Third place	2011 Sudan
CECAFA Cup
Winner	2007 Tanzania
- * Club domestic league appearances and goals as of 23:41, 13 February 2012 (UTC) ‡ National team caps and goals as of 23:41, 13 February 2012 (UTC)

Ahmed El Basha (born January 2, 1982) is a Sudanese football defender who plays for Al-Merreikh.

He is member of the Sudan National Football Team. He is a left back, he may also play as defensive midfielder or also as a winger. He was on loan to Libyan club Al-Nasr Benghazi and returned to El-Merreikh in June 2011.

He is known because of his run through the flank and his crosses.

== International goals ==
#	Date	Venue	Opponent	Score	Result	Competition
1.	19 August 2011	Asmara, Eritrea	Eritrea	3-0	Won	Friendly

== Honours ==
Sudan

- African Nations Championship: 3rd place, 2011
- CECAFA Cup: 2007
