= Djoliba AC =

Association football club in Mali

- Full name: Djoliba Athletic Club
- Founded: 1960
- Ground: Stade 26 Mars, Bamako
- Capacity: 50,000
- President: Oumarou Diabaté
- Manager: Mory Boudo
- League: Malien Première Division
- 2025–26: Champions
Home colours	Away colours

Djoliba Athletic Club is a Malian football club and one of the two biggest teams in Mali alongside Stade Malien. The team is based in the capital city of Bamako. It has its headquarters and three training stadia at Complex Sportif Hérémakono, in the Heremakono Quartier. The President of Djoliba AC, re-elected in 2009 to a four-year term, is Karounga Keita, a Vice President of the Malian Football Federation, former trainer at the club, who was a player at the founding of the club in 1960. Djoliba or Joliba is the name of the Niger River in the Bamana language. Not only a football club, Djoliba AC is an Omnisports club which fields teams in many sports, and is operated as a membership organisation with an elected board.

== History ==
The club was created in 1960 with the merger of "Africa Sport" Bamako and "Foyer du Soudan", two successful teams during French Colonial rule.

The team was helped a lot during the 1970s by officer Tiécoro Bagayoko, a prominent member of the ruling military dictatorship of president Moussa Traoré. Many critics of Djoliba AC, especially coming from the rival Stade Malien, claim that the strength of the club was built during that period.

However, Bagayoko was gone in 1978 after his arrest, yet Djoliba kept winning titles and cups. Today, it is reputed to be the biggest and the most organized soccer club in Mali.

=== Malien Première Division 2007/08 ===
2008 was a year of great success for Djoliba, having finished the year before in second place to their cross-town rivals, Djoliba handily took the cup and league double in 2008. Reigning champions from the 2007 Malien Première Division, Stade and Djoliba sat atop the standings the entire season, with Djoliba leading by a small but consistent margin in the run up to the final games. Their 7 July derby match was postponed to August, and although they lost this match, their rivals, Stade, faltered where Djoliba were consistent, finishing the season 9 points ahead of Stade. The only Cup meeting between the two rivals in the season was in the semi-finals of the Malien Cup, where Stade received a 5–0 drubbing at the hands of Djoliba.

==== Bamako District Mayor's Cup ====
Djoliba's one failure came at the end of the season, losing the "Coupe du Maire du District": the Bamako District Mayor's Cup to arch rivals Stade Malien. But while Stade made it to the final, its victory over Djoliba came from legal, rather than on the field factors. In the 44th minute of the match, Djoliba supporters rioted, attacking officials, other fans, and journalists. The match was called off, and several days later, awarded to Stade. Djoliba were fined 500.000 F cfa, all payments for previous matches were withdrawn, and they were excluded from the 2009 competition. Stade received the trophy and a 750,000 F Cfa award from the Mayor of Bamako Adama Sangaré on 23 September.

=== 2008/09 Season ===
Djoliba competed in 2008–09 Malian Première Division, beginning in December 2008. They began the season successfully, taking the Super Coupe National du Mali on 6 December against Club Olympique de Bamako 5–2. The Super Coupe launches the regular schedule by pitting the previous years' League and Cup winners. As Djoliba won both, they faced last years' Coupe du Mali runner up, COB.

=== Djoliba AC today ===
In 2010, Djoliba celebrated its 50th anniversary of the merger and foundation of the club.

Their last championship win was in 2012 and their last super cup win was in 2013.

Djoliba appeared at group stage in the 2012 CAF Confederation Cup, they challenged with AC Léopards of the Republic of the Congo, Morocco's WAC Casablanca and brought Mali's largest rivalry to the cup competition, Stade Malien, Djoliba defeat that club in two matches. Djoliba advanced to the semis and defeated a Sudanese club and challenged with AC Léopard's in the finals and lost to that club, there, they made the greatest position in the continental competitions for Djoliba.

In the 2017 season, Djoliba was 8th place and had two wins and a draw and had seven points before the abandonment as FEMAFOOT was dissolved by the government mainly by an undetermined reason on 9 March, over a week later, FIFA suspended the Malian Football Federation on 17 March which meant all Malian clubs competing at the continental level were banned until 7 May. The reason was that money that the Ministry of Sport gave to the clubs. The least problem of the

Djoliba appeared in the 2017 CAF Confederation Cup and faced Egypt's al-Masry. Djoliba defeated that club 2–0, as a result of the March 2017 dissolution by the government, al-Masry was awarded against Djoliba 0–3 in the away match somewhere on 18 March. The season was halted and in early May, the Federation was restored, their next challenge would be with Kita, that 6th round match is on hold. Their first challenge since the restoration was on 8 May, a 7th round match where the club defeated Black Stars 0–5 in Badalabougou.

== Stadium ==
Djoliba plays at Stade 26 Mars. The club trains at Complex Sportif Hérémakono, in the Heremakono Quartier.

== Rivalries ==
Its rivalry is with Stade Malien forming the nation's largest rivalry known as the Grand Derby. Real Bamako is Djoliba's other rivalry being called the Bamako Derby and the nation's second largest.

== Honours ==
=== League ===
- Malien Première Division
  - Winners (25): 1966, 1967, 1968, 1971, 1973, 1974, 1975, 1976, 1979, 1981–82, 1984–85, 1987–88, 1989–90, 1991–92, 1995–96, 1996–97, 1997–98, 1998–99, 2003–04, 2007–08, 2008–09, 2011–12, 2021–22, 2023–24, 2025–26

=== Cup ===
- Malien Cup
  - Winners (21): 1965, 1971, 1973, 1974, 1975, 1976, 1977, 1978, 1979, 1981, 1983, 1993, 1996, 1998, 2003, 2004, 2007, 2008, 2009, 2022, 2026
- Super Coupe National du Mali
  - Winners (8): 1993, 1994, 1997, 1999, 2008, 2012, 2013, 2024

== League and cup history ==
=== Performance in CAF competitions ===
Competition	Matches	W	D	L	GF	GA
African Cup of Champions Clubs / CAF Champions League	76	30	20	26		
CAF Confederation Cup	54	20	15	19		
CAF Cup Winners' Cup	22	9	8	6		
CAF Cup	16	6	1	7	17	16
Total	168	63	44	56		

Djoliba's results in CAF competition
Season	Competition	Qualification method	Round	Opposition	Home	Away	Aggregate
1967	African Cup of Champions Clubs	Malian champions	Second Round	(Liberia) Invincible Eleven			w/o^{1}
1967	African Cup of Champions Clubs	Malian champions	Quarterfinals	(Guinea) Hafia FC	2–1	0–0	2–1
1967	African Cup of Champions Clubs	Malian champions	Semifinals	(Ghana) Hearts of Oak	1–1	2–1	2–1
1972	African Cup of Champions Clubs	Malian champions	First Round	(Republic of Upper Volta) ASFA Ouagadougou	1–0	1–3	4–1
1972	African Cup of Champions Clubs	Malian champions	Second Round	(Senegal) ASFA Dakar	2–0	2–0	2–2 ^{2}
1972	African Cup of Champions Clubs	Malian champions	Quarterfinals	(Guinea) Hafia FC	2–1	3–0	2–4
1974	African Cup of Champions Clubs	Malian champions	Second Round	(Nigeria) Bendel Insurance	2–0	1–0	2–1
1974	African Cup of Champions Clubs	Malian champions	Quarterfinals	(Republic of the Congo) CARA Brazzaville	0–0	3–0	2–1
1975	African Cup of Champions Clubs	Malian champions	Second Round	(Sierra Leone) Mighty Blackpool	2–0	0–1	3–0
1975	African Cup of Champions Clubs	Malian champions	Quarterfinals	(Togo) Lomé	1–1	3–2	3–4
1976	African Cup of Champions Clubs	Malian champions	First Round	(The Gambia) Real de Banjul	2–0	0–2	4–0
1976	African Cup of Champions Clubs	Malian champions	Second Round	(Guinea) Hafia FC	2–1	2–0	2–3
1977	African Cup of Champions Clubs	Malian champions	First Round	(Guinea-Bissau) UDIB	5–0	0–1	6–0
1977	African Cup of Champions Clubs	Malian champions	Second Round	(Ivory Coast) SC Gagnoa	1–1	1–3	4–2
1977	African Cup of Champions Clubs	Malian champions	Quarter-Finals	(Togo) Lomé	2–0	1–0	2–1^{3}
1980	African Cup of Champions Clubs	Malian champions	First Round	(Niger) AS Niamey	2–0	0–1	3–0
1980	African Cup of Champions Clubs	Malian champions	Second Round	(Ghana) Hearts of Oak	1–1	1–0	1–2
1981	CAF Cup Winners' Cup	Malian Cup winners	First Round	(Ivory Coast) RC Daloa	1–0	2–1	2–2 (a)
1981	CAF Cup Winners' Cup	Malian Cup winners	Second Round	(Togo) AC Semassi	3–0	0–1	4–0
1981	CAF Cup Winners' Cup	Malian Cup winners	Quarterfinals	(Kenya) Gor Mahia FC	2–0	1–0	2–1
1981	CAF Cup Winners' Cup	Malian Cup winners	Semifinals	(Nigeria) Stationery Stores	0–0	1–0	0–1
1982	CAF Cup Winners' Cup	Malian Cup winners	First Round	(Benin) Requins de l'Atlantique FC	1–0	0–0	1–0
1982	CAF Cup Winners' Cup	Malian Cup winners	Second Round	(Cameroon) Union Douala	3–0	0–1	4–0
1982	CAF Cup Winners' Cup	Malian Cup winners	Quarterfinals	(Zaire) AS Vita Club	1–0	0–0	1–0
1982	CAF Cup Winners' Cup	Malian Cup winners	Semifinals	(Zambia) Power Dynamos FC	0–0	2–1	1–2
1983	African Cup of Champions Clubs	Malian champions	First Round	(Guinea) Hafia FC	0–0	1–0	0–1
1984	CAF Cup Winners' Cup	Malian Cup winners	First Round	(Ghana) Great Olympics	0–4	0–0	0–4
1985	CAF Cup Winners' Cup	Malian Cup winners	First Round	(Algeria) MP Oran	0–0	2–0	0–2
1989	African Cup of Champions Clubs	Malian champions	First Round	(Guinea) Horoya AC	1–0	0–0	1–0
1989	African Cup of Champions Clubs	Malian champions	Second Round	(Sierra Leone) Mighty Blackpool	0–0	1–2	1–2
1991	African Cup of Champions Clubs	Malian champions	Preliminary Round	(Senegal) ASC Port Autonome	1–0	0–0	1–0
1991	African Cup of Champions Clubs	Malian champions	First Round	(Tunisia) Club Africain	0–0	2–0	0–2
1992	CAF Cup		First Round	(Burkina Faso) USC Bobo Dioulasso	2–1	1–0	2–2 (a)
1993	African Cup of Champions Clubs	Malian champions	Preliminary Round	(Mauritania) ASC Sonader Ksar	1–0	1–1	2–1
1993	African Cup of Champions Clubs	Malian champions	First Round	(Ivory Coast) ASEC Mimosas	1–1	2–0	1–3
1994	CAF Cup Winners' Cup	Malian Cup winners	First Round	(Algeria) NA Hussein Dey	0–0	2–0	0–2
1995	CAF Cup		First Round	(Zaire) SM Sanga Balende	2–0	1–0	2–1
1995	CAF Cup		Second Round	(Nigeria) Shooting Stars	2–0	1–0	2–1
1995	CAF Cup		Quarterfinals	(Republic of the Congo) Inter Brazzaville	0–2	1–2	1–3
1997	CAF Champions League	Malian champions	First Round	(Tunisia) Club Africain	1–1	3–2	3–4
1998	CAF Champions League	Malian champions	First Round	(Ghana) Hearts of Oak	0–0	1–0	0–1
2000	CAF Champions League	Malian champions	First Round	(Cameroon) Cotonsport Garoua	2–0	3–1	3–3 (a)
2000	CAF Champions League	Malian champions	Second Round	(Morocco) Raja Casablanca	2–1	2–1	2–1 (2–4 p)
2002	CAF Cup		First Round	(Nigeria) NPA FC	3–0	2–1	4–2
2002	CAF Cup		Second Round	(Togo) Maranatha FC	1–0	2–1	2–2 (a)
2002	CAF Cup		Quarterfinals	(Algeria) JS Kabylie	0–0	2–1	1–2
2003	CAF Cup		First Round	(Gabon) FC 105 Libreville	3–1	3–0	3–4
2005	CAF Champions League	Malian champions	First Round	(Senegal) Douanes (Dakar)	1–1	1–0	1–2
2008	CAF Confederation Cup	Malian Cup winners	First Round	(Guinea) Satellite FC	2–0	1–0	2–1
2008	CAF Confederation Cup	Malian Cup winners	Second Round	(Gabon) AS Mangasport	3–1	1–2	5–2
2008	CAF Confederation Cup	Malian Cup winners	Third Round	(Tunisia) Club Africain	0–0	0–0	0–0 (3–5 p)
2010	CAF Champions League	Malian champions	Preliminary Round	(Libya) Al-Ahly Benghazi	1–0	0–0	1–0
2010	CAF Champions League	Malian champions	First Round	(Senegal) ASC Linguère	1–0	1–0	1–1 (4–3 p)
2010	CAF Champions League	Malian champions	Second Round	(Democratic Republic of the Congo) TP Mazembe	0–1	3–0	0–4
2010	CAF Confederation Cup	Malian Cup winners	Second Round	(Algeria) CR Belouizdad	0–0	1–1	1–1 (a)
2010	CAF Confederation Cup	Malian Cup winners	Group Stage^{4}	(Sudan) Al-Hilal Club	2–0	2–1	3rd
2010	CAF Confederation Cup	Malian Cup winners	Group Stage^{4}	(Niger) AS FAN	1–0	0–0	3rd
2010	CAF Confederation Cup	Malian Cup winners	Group Stage^{4}	(Libya) Al-Ittihad Tripoli	0–1	2–0	3rd
2011	CAF Champions League	Malian champions	First Round	(Sierra Leone) East End Lions	2–0	0–2	4–0
2011	CAF Champions League	Malian champions	Second Round	(Senegal) ASC Diaraf	1–1	3–0	1–4
2012	CAF Champions League	Premiere Division runner-up	First Round	(Uganda) URA SC	2–0	0–2	4–0
2012	CAF Champions League	Premiere Division runner-up	Second Round	(Nigeria) Sunshine Stars	1–1	1–0	1–2
2012	CAF Confederation Cup	Malian Cup winners	Round of 16	(Tunisia) Club Africain	2–0	2–0	2–2 (4–3 p)
2012	CAF Confederation Cup	Malian Cup winners	Group Stage^{4}	(Republic of the Congo) AC Léopards	1–1	3–0	1st
2012	CAF Confederation Cup	Malian Cup winners	Group Stage^{4}	(Mali) Stade Malien	2–1	2–0	1st
2012	CAF Confederation Cup	Malian Cup winners	Group Stage^{4}	(Morocco) WAC Casablanca	2–1	1–2	1st
2012	CAF Confederation Cup	Malian Cup winners	Semifinals	(Sudan) Al-Hilal Club	2–0	2–0	2–2 (7–6 p)
2012	CAF Confederation Cup	Malian Cup winners	Finals	(Republic of the Congo) AC Léopards	2–2	2–1	3–4
2013	CAF Champions League	Premier Division runner-up	First Round	(Ethiopia) Saint George SA	1–1	2–1	2–3
2015	CAF Confederation Cup	Malian Cup winners	First Round	(Egypt) Petrojet	2–2	1–2	4–3
2015	CAF Confederation Cup	Malian Cup winners	Second Round	(Ghana) Hearts of Oak	1–2	0–1	2–2 (a)
2017	CAF Confederation Cup	Malian Cup winners	Preliminary Round	(Egypt) al-Masry	2–0	3–0^{4}	2–3
2018	CAF Confederation Cup	Malian Cup winners	Preliminary Round	(Liberia) ELWA United			w/o^{5}
2018	CAF Confederation Cup	Malian Cup winners	First Round	(Rwanda) APR F.C.	1–0	2–1	2–2(a)
2018	CAF Confederation Cup	Malian Cup winners	Play-off Round	(Nigeria) MFM F.C.	0–0	0–1	1–0
2018	CAF Confederation Cup	Malian Cup winners	Group Stage	(Nigeria) Enyimba F.C.	0–1	2–0	4th
2018	CAF Confederation Cup	Malian Cup winners	Group Stage	(Republic of the Congo) CARA Brazzaville	2–0	1–0	4th
2018	CAF Confederation Cup	Malian Cup winners	Group Stage	(Ivory Coast) Williamsville AC	1–1	0–0	4th
2018–19	CAF Confederation Cup	Malian Cup runners-up	Preliminary Round	(Senegal) Génération Foot	0–1	0–0	0–1
2019–20	CAF Confederation Cup	Malian Cup runners-up	First Round	(Togo) Maranatha FC	1–1	1–2	3–2
2019–20	CAF Confederation Cup	Malian Cup runners-up	Play-off Round	(Chad) Elect-Sport FC	4–0	1–0	5–0
2019–20	CAF Confederation Cup	Malian Cup runners-up	Group Stage	(Guinea) Horoya	0–0	1–0	3rd
2019–20	CAF Confederation Cup	Malian Cup runners-up	Group Stage	(Libya) Al-Nasr	0–1	1–1	3rd
2019–20	CAF Confederation Cup	Malian Cup runners-up	Group Stage	(South Africa) Bidvest Wits	1–0	0–2	3rd
2022–23	CAF Champions League	Malian champions	First Round	(Equatorial Guinea) Deportivo Mongomo	5–0	2–0	5–2
2022–23	CAF Champions League	Malian champions	Second Round	(Algeria) CR Belouizdad	2–1	2–0	2–3

^{1}Invincible Eleven withdrew
^{2} The match was finished 2-0 in favour of Djoliba, ASFA refused to play the penalty shootout due to arbitration, they were to be banned from CAF competitions for three years, no ban was put as ASFA Dakar participated the following season after winning their second championship title
^{3}Djoliba was disqualified for not paying their debts to the CAF
^{4}FIFA suspended the Malian Football Federation on 17 March 2017 which meant all Malian clubs such as Djoliba were banned from participating in African football competitions, in early May, the suspension has been lifted.
^{5}Djoliba won on walkover after ELWA United withdrew.

=== WAFU Club Championship ===
Djoliba's results at the WAFU Club Championship
Season	Competition	Qualification method	Round	Opposition	Home	Away	Aggregate
1987	WAFU Club Championship		Preliminary Round	(Sierra Leone) Sierra Fisheries	1–0	1–1	2–1
1987	WAFU Club Championship		Quarterfinals	(Ivory Coast) Stella Club d'Adjamé	0–2	1–1	1–3
1990	WAFU Club Championship		Preliminary Round	(Senegal) ETICS Thiès	0–3	3–2	6–3
1990	WAFU Club Championship		Quarterfinals	(Ghana) Okwahu United	N/A	N/A	Qual.
1990	WAFU Club Championship		Semifinals	(Sierra Leone) Sierra Fisheries	1–0	1–1	2–1
1990	WAFU Club Championship		Finals	(Ivory Coast) ASEC Abidjan	0–1	1–1	2–1

=== National level ===
Season	Tier	Pos.	Pl.	W	D	L	GS	GA	GD	P	Cup	Notes
2007–08	1	1	26	20	3	3	44	13	+31	64	Winner	
2008–09	1	1	26	16	7	3	43	15	+28	55	Winner	
2009–10	1	2	26	17	8	1	34	9	+25	59		
2010–11	1	2	26	14	7	5	37	19	+18	49		
2011–12	1	1	26	-	-	-	-	-	-	-		
2012–13	1	3	30	15	10	5	47	19	+28	55	Finalist	

== Statistics ==
- Best position: Semifinals (continental)
- Best position at cup competitions: Finalist (continental)

== Notable players ==
- (Burkina Faso) Vincent Traoré
- (Ivory Coast) Koffi Pascal N'Guessan
- (Ivory Coast) Bourahama Sidibé
- (France) Issa Nabioul N’Diaye
- (France) Guillaume Traoré
- Ibrahima Bangoura Olyssé (eight caps for the Guinea national football team)
- (Guinea) Almamy Camara
- (Mali) Sedonoude Janvier Abouta
- (Mali) Salif Coulibaly
- (Mali) Moussa Nesta Diallo
- (Mali) Kalilou Doumbia
- (Mali) Mohamed Oumar Konaté (Ivorian born former Malian U-20 national football team player)
- (Mali) Boubacar Koné
- (Mali) Sékou Rafan Sidibé
- (Mali) Idrissa Traoré
- (Mali) Issa Traoré
- Mahamane Cissé (three caps for the Niger national football team and former Malian U-20 national team member)
- (Senegal) Ousmane Cissé
- (Senegal) Yahaya Coulibaly
- (Senegal) Bourahama Sidibé
- (Togo) Ouro-Nimini Tchagnirou

== Basketball team ==
Djoliba AC also fields both a men's and women's basketball team that play in the Ligue 1, the top national divisions. The men's team has won two Malian Cups (in 1965 and 1966).
