= Rudy Ndey =

Congolese former professional footballer (born 1990)

Personal information
- Full name: Rudy Guélord Bhebey-Ndey
- Date of birth: 9 March 1986 (age 40)
- Place of birth: Brazzaville, Republic of the Congo
- Positions: Forward; left winger

Senior career*
Years	Team	Apps	(Gls)
2003–2005	Étoile du Congo		
2005–2006	Delta Téléstar		
2006	Saint Michel d'Ouenzé		
2006–2007	Zorya Luhansk	3	(0)
2007–2008	Delta Téléstar		
2008	Diables Noirs		
2008–2009	CARA Brazzaville		
2009	Diables Noirs		
2009–2010	Étoile du Congo		
2010–2015	AC Léopards		

International career
2005–2015	Congo	13	(3)
- * Club domestic league appearances and goals

Rudy Guélord Bhebey-Ndey (born 9 March 1986) is a Congolese former professional footballer who played as a forward for AC Léopards.

== International career ==
In January 2014, coach Claude Leroy invited Ndey to be a part of the Congo national squad for the 2014 African Nations Championship. The Congo were eliminated in the group stage after losing to Ghana, drawing with Libya and defeating Ethiopia, with Ndey himself scoring the only goal in that match.

== Spinal cord injury ==
Ndey had a career-ending spinal cord injury on 26 July 2015 in a match against Zamalek SC at the 2015 CAF Confederation Cup. He arrived at the hospital with "serious damage to his spinal column between his fifth and sixth vertebra, a blow to the spinal cord, breathing difficulties and a cerebral hemorrhage".

After emergency surgery, he was sent to France to help speed up his recovery. The injury rendered him tetraplegic and put a stop to his career.
