= Stade Denis Sassou Nguesso =

Coordinates: 4°12′27″S 12°41′08″E

- Stade Denis Sassou Nguesso
- Interactive map of Stade Denis Sassou Nguesso
- Full name: Stade Denis Sassou Nguesso
- Location: Dolisie, Republic of the Congo
- Capacity: 5,000

Tenant
- AC Léopard

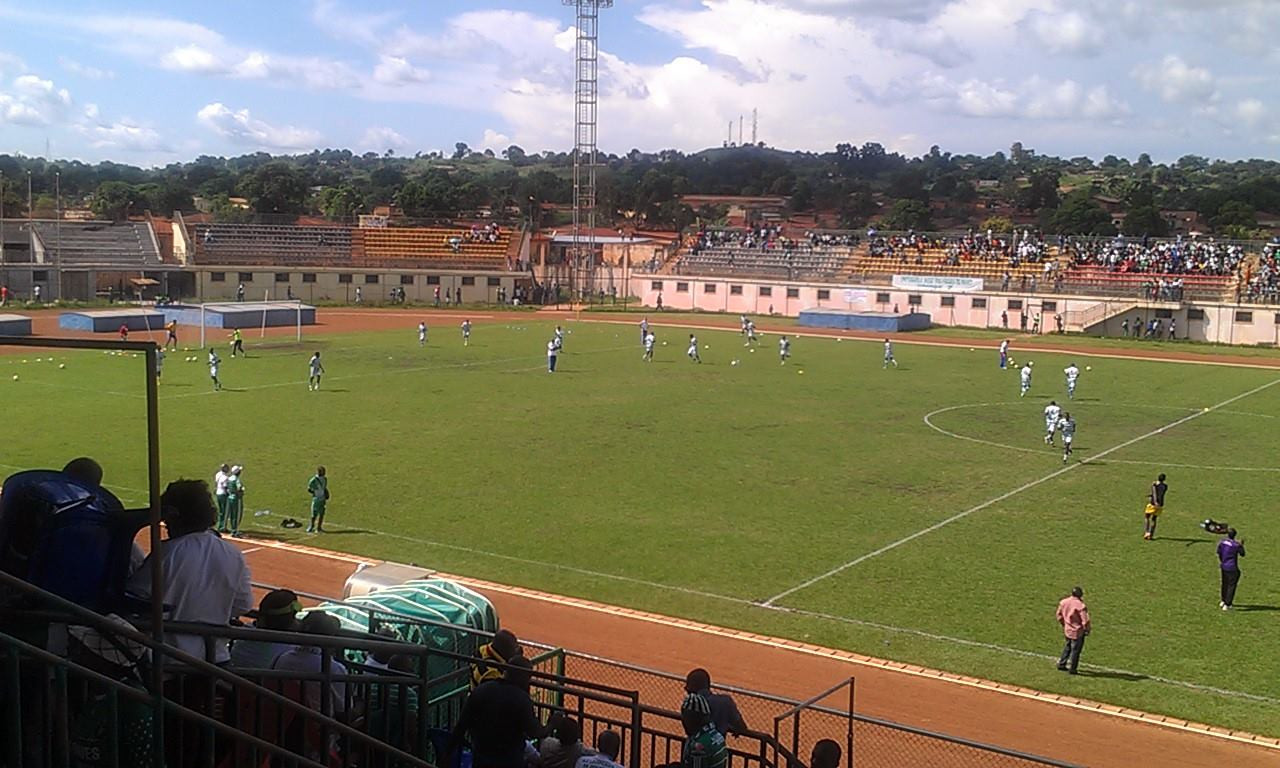
Stade dolisie.jpg

Stade Denis Sassou Nguesso is a multi-use stadium in Dolisie, Republic of the Congo. It is used for football matches and serves as the home of AC Léopard of the Congo Premier League. It holds 5,000 spectators.
