= AC Léopards =

Association football club

- Full name: Athlétic Club Léopards de Dolisie
- Nicknames: Les Fauves de Niari (The Beasts from Niari)
- Founded: 1953
- Ground: Stade Denis Sassou Nguesso, Dolisie
- Capacity: 5,000
- Chairman: Rémy Ayayos Ikounga
- League: Congo Premier League
- 2023–2024: Champions
Home colours	Away colours

Athlétic Club Léopards de Dolisie is a football (soccer) club from the Republic of Congo based in Dolisie, Niari Department.

== Honours ==
- Congo Premier League
  - Winner (5): 2012, 2013, 2016, 2017, 2024
  - Runners-up (3): 2009, 2010, 2011
- Coupe du Congo
  - Winner (5): 2009, 2011, 2013, 2016, 2017
  - Runners-up (2): 2012, 2015
- Super Coupe du Congo
  - Winner (2): 2009, 2011
- CAF Confederation Cup
  - Winner (1): 2012

== Performance in CAF competitions ==
As of 27 September 2025

Competition	Matches	W	D	L	GF	GA
CAF Champions League	34	11	8	15	30	38
CAF Confederation Cup	28	13	7	8	46	36
CAF Super Cup	1	0	0	1	1	2
Total	63	24	15	24	77	76

Season	Competition	Round	Country	Club	Home	Away	Aggregate
2010	CAF Confederation Cup	PR	(Equatorial Guinea)	Dragón	4–0	3–2	7–2
2010	CAF Confederation Cup	R1	(Cameroon)	Coton Sport FC	3–1	0–2	3–3
2011	CAF Confederation Cup	PR	(Rwanda)	Etincelles	1–1	2–0	3–1
2011	CAF Confederation Cup	R1	(Angola)	1º de Agosto	1–0	0–2	1–2
2012	CAF Confederation Cup	PR	(Central African Republic)	AS Tempête Mocaf	2–0	2–1	4–2
2012	CAF Confederation Cup	R1	(Tunisia)	CS Sfaxien	1–2	2–0	3–2
2012	CAF Confederation Cup	R2	(Nigeria)	Heartland	2–1	2–3	4–4
2012	CAF Confederation Cup	PL	(Morocco)	Maghreb de Fès	2–0	0–1	2–1
2012	CAF Confederation Cup	GS	(Mali)	Djoliba	3–0	1–1	2nd
2012	CAF Confederation Cup	GS	(Morocco)	Wydad Casablanca	1–1	1–3	2nd
2012	CAF Confederation Cup	GS	(Mali)	Stade Malien	1–0	1–1	2nd
2012	CAF Confederation Cup	SF	(Sudan)	Al-Merreikh	2–1	0–0	4–2
2012	CAF Confederation Cup	Final	(Mali)	Djoliba	2–1	2–2	4–3
2013	CAF Super Cup	PR	(Egypt)	Al-Ahly	1–2		
2013	CAF Champions League	PR	(Gabon)	CF Mounana	2–0	0–1	2–1
2013	CAF Champions League	R1	(Nigeria)	Kano Pillars	3–0	1–4	4–4
2013	CAF Champions League	R2	(Algeria)	ES Sétif	3–1	1–3	4–4
2013	CAF Champions League	GS	(Egypt)	Al-Ahly	0–1	1–2	4th
2013	CAF Champions League	GS	(South Africa)	Orlando Pirates	1–0	0–0	4th
2013	CAF Champions League	GS	(Egypt)	Zamalek	1–0	1–4	4th
2014	CAF Champions League	PR	(Rwanda)	Rayon Sports	0–0	2–2	2–2
2014	CAF Champions League	R1	(Angola)	Primeiro de Agosto	4–1	0–2	4–3
2014	CAF Champions League	R2	(Sudan)	Al-Hilal	1–1	0–0	1–1
2015	CAF Champions League	R1	(Kenya)	Gor Mahia	1–0	1–0	2–0
2015	CAF Champions League	R2	(Egypt)	Smouha	1–0	0–2	1–2
2015	CAF Confederation Cup	POR	(Nigeria)	Warri Wolves	3–0	1–3	4–3
2015	CAF Confederation Cup	GS	(South Africa)	Orlando Pirates	0–1	0–2	3rd
2015	CAF Confederation Cup	GS	(Tunisia)	CS Sfaxien	0–0	1–1	3rd
2015	CAF Confederation Cup	GS	(Egypt)	Zamalek	1–0	0–2	3rd
2016	CAF Champions League	R1	(South Africa)	Mamelodi Sundowns	0–2	1–1	1–3
2017	CAF Champions League	PR	(Cameroon)	UMS de Loum	1–0	1–2	2–2 (a)
2017	CAF Champions League	R1	(Ethiopia)	Saint George	0–1	0–2	0–3
2017	CAF Confederation Cup	POR	(Eswatini)	Mbabane Swallows	1–0	2–4	3–4
2018	CAF Champions League	PR	(Togo)	AS Togo-Port	2–1	1–2	3–3 (3–4 (p))
2024–25	CAF Champions League	R1	(Algeria)	CR Belouizdad	0–2	0–1	0–3
2025–26	CAF Champions League	R1	(Mozambique)	Black Bulls	0–0	0–0	0–0 (4–5 (p))
