= 2022–23 Stade Malien basketball season =

Stade Malien
2022–23 season
- Chairman: Mahamadou Samaké
- Head coach: Kaba Kanté
- Moustapha Touré: Moustapha Touré
- Arena: Palais des Sports Salamatou Maiga
- Ligue 1: Champions
- Basketball Africa League: Third place
- Scoring leader: Basketball Africa League: Aliou Diarra (18.0); Road to BAL: Souleymane Berthé (14.8)

The 2022–23 season was Stade Malien men's basketball team's 62nd season in existence. They played in their first-ever Basketball Africa League (BAL) season, as well as in the Ligue 1.

Stade Malien qualified for the 2023 BAL season following a third place in the qualifying tournament, and made their debut in the league. They surprisingly won the Sahara Conference title. After a successful playoff run, the Blancs de Bamako finished in third place, after defeating Petro de Luanda in the playoff. Aliou Diarra was named the BAL Defensive Player of the Year.

== Roster ==
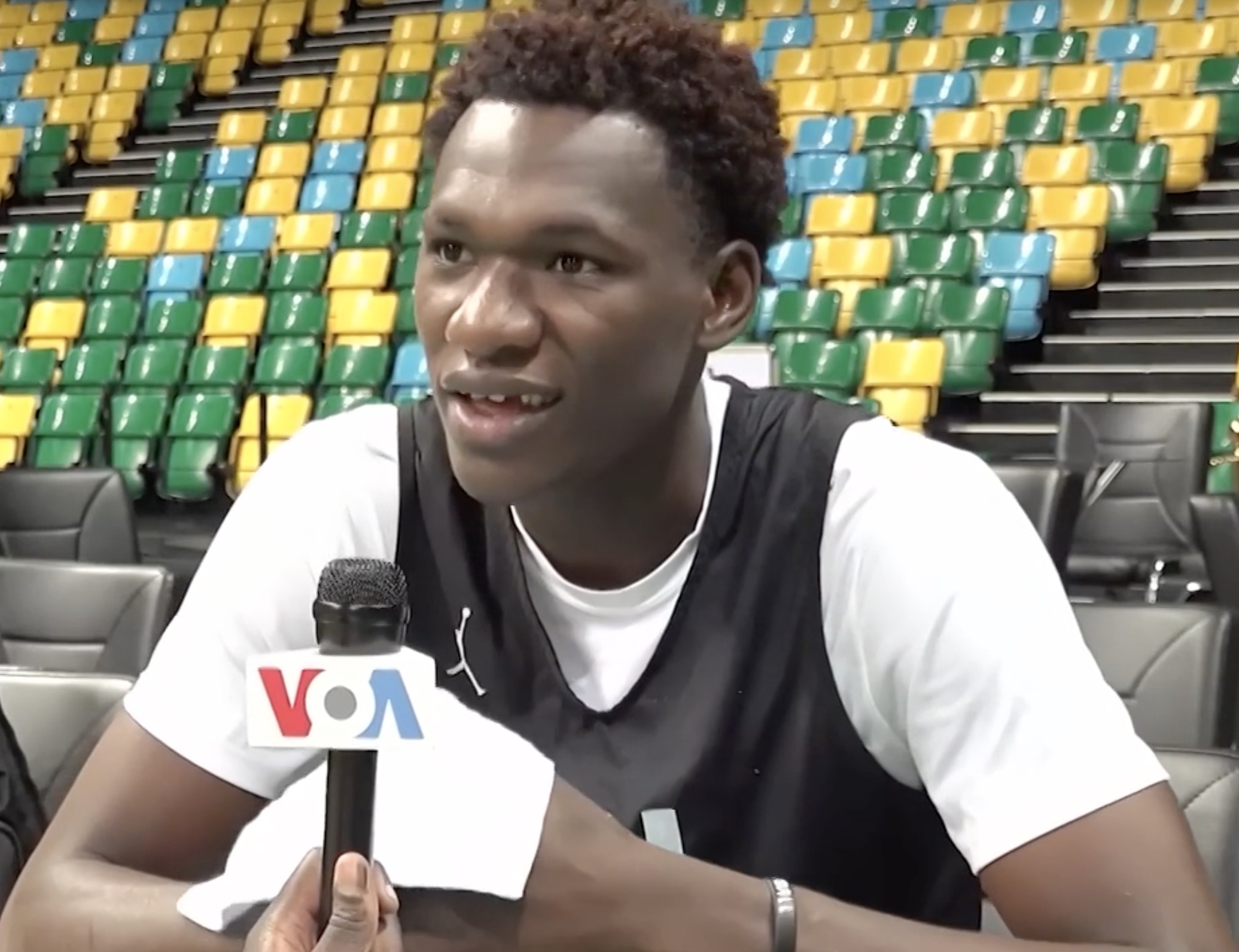
Aliou Diarra led Stade Malien to the third place medal

Note: Flags indicate national team eligibility at FIBA-sanctioned events. Players may hold other non-FIBA nationalities not displayed.

Stade Malien roster
Players
Coaches

Pos.	No.	Nat.	Name	Ht.	Age
PG	1	(Mali)	Keita, Makan (C)	1.83 m (6 ft 0 in)	27 – 8 May 1999
SG	2	(Mali)	Traoré, Namakan	1.93 m (6 ft 4 in)	28 – 16 April 1998
PF	5	(Mali)	Pare, Mohamed	1.98 m (6 ft 6 in)	29 – 1 November 1996
G	6	(Nigeria)	Amayo, Kelvin (I)	1.93 m (6 ft 4 in)	34 – 9 January 1992
G	7	(Mali)	Bagayoko, Oumar		33 – 11 March 1993
SG	10	(Mali)	Keita, Mamadou	1.92 m (6 ft 4 in)	33 – 1 February 1993
SF	12	(Mali)	Konate, Tamandjan	1.99 m (6 ft 6 in)	23 – 2 November 2002
F	13	(Mali)	Diallo, Ibrahima	2.06 m (6 ft 9 in)	28 – 8 May 1998
G	14	(Mali)	Sissouma, Soumaila	1.86 m (6 ft 1 in)	24 – 1 December 2001
C	15	(Mali)	Diarra, Aliou	2.06 m (6 ft 9 in)	24 – 31 December 2001
SF	23	(Mali)	Berthé, Souleymane	2.00 m (6 ft 7 in)	26 – 5 October 2000
C	24	(Nigeria)	Chinyelu, Rueben (E)	2.11 m (6 ft 11 in)	23 – 30 September 2003
PF	28	(United States)	Brigeforth, Brian (I)	2.08 m (6 ft 10 in)	32 – 3 June 1994
PF	34	(Morocco)	Wilkins, John (I)	2.08 m (6 ft 10 in)	37 – 13 July 1989
PG	45	(United States)	Foster, Gregory Clay (I)	1.90 m (6 ft 3 in)	37 – 8 June 1989

Head coach

- (Mali) Kaba Kanté

Assistant coach(es)

- (Mali) Boubacar Kanouté
- (Mali) Abdrahamane Maïga

Legend

- (C) Team captain
- Injured

- Roster
Updated: September 25, 2023

== Games ==
=== Road to BAL ===
==== First round ====
21 October 2022	Stade Malien (Mali)	54–66	(Ivory Coast) ABC Fighters	Palais du 29 Juillet, Niamey, Niger
15:00 (GMT+1)	Scoring by quarter: 19–8, 14–28, 11–15, 10–15
		Boxscore

22 October 2022	Elan Coton (Benin)	36–85	(Mali) Stade Malien	Palais du 29 Juillet, Niamey, Niger
14:00 (GMT+1)	Scoring by quarter: 2–25, 10–20, 15–19, 9–21
		Boxscore

23 October 2022	Nigelec (Niger)	55–82	(Mali) Stade Malien	Palais du 29 Juillet, Niamey, Niger
16:30 (GMT+1)	Scoring by quarter: 11–21, 16–26, 12–15, 16–20
		Boxscore

==== Elite 16 ====
===== Group stage =====
15 November	SLAC (Guinea)	76–82	(Mali) Stade Malien	Palais des Sports de Treichville, Abidjan
18:00	Scoring by quarter: 21–20, 18–23, 22–202, 15–19
	Pts: Miller Jr. 22; Rebs: Miller Jr. 10; Asts: Nwabuzor 5	Boxscore	Pts: Mamadou Keita 20; Rebs: Diarra 11; Asts: Makan Keita 4

14 November	FAP (Cameroon)	52–65	(Mali) Stade Malien	Palais des Sports de Treichville, Abidjan
18:00	Scoring by quarter: 10–17, 18–17, 13–14, 11–17
	Pts: Almeida 11; Rebs: Ngaransou 12; Asts: Tametong 6	Boxscore	Pts: Berthe 15; Rebs: Diarra 14; Asts: Berthe 5

16 November	Stade Malien (Mali)	91–64	(Equatorial Guinea) Nueva Era	Palais des Sports de Treichville, Abidjan
13:00	Scoring by quarter: 28–14, 18–18, 18–14, 27–18
	Pts: Berthe 13; Rebs: Three players 3 Asts: Mamadou Keita 4	Boxscore	Pts: Worthy 21; Rebs: Hinestrosa 10; Asts: Bobepari 5

===== Semifinal =====
18 November	Stade Malien (Mali)	63–80	(Ivory Coast) ABC Fighters	Palais des Sports de Treichville, Abidjan
21:00	Scoring by quarter: 10–21, 18–20, 13–22, 22–17
	Pts: Berthe 15; Rebs: Diarra 12; Asts: Three players 3	Boxscore	Pts: Konaté 17; Rebs: Kone 10; Asts: Pacheco Ortiz 4

==== Third place game ====
19 November	Bangui Sporting Club (Central African Republic)	59–62	(Mali) Stade Malien	Palais des Sports de Treichville, Abidjan
18:30	Scoring by quarter: 15–26, 18–24, 17–10, 9–12
	Pts: Gasana, Fula Nganga 15; Rebs: Gray 11; Asts: Nambaï 2	Report	Pts: Berthe 22; Rebs: Diarra 18; Asts: Makan 5

=== BAL ===
==== First phase ====
12 March 2023	Stade Malien (Mali)	68–78	(Tunisia) US Monastir	Dakar Arena, Dakar
17:30	Scoring by quarter: 15–23, 22–21, 12–16, 19–18
	Pts: Berthe 34; Rebs: Diarra 14; Asts: Keita 3	Boxscore	Pts: Randle 18; Rebs: Thomas 10; Asts: Randle 7	Attendance: 883; Referees: Nate Cearley, Yann Vezo Davidson, Erick Otieno

14 March 2023	Kwara Falcons (Nigeria)	74–78	(Mali) Stade Malien	Dakar Arena, Dakar
16:00	Scoring by quarter: 15–18, 16–18, 18–28, 25–14
	Pts: Wilson 19; Rebs: Mohammed 8 Asts: Mordi 5		Pts: Diarra 23; Rebs: Diarra 14; Asts: Three players 3	Attendance: 300; Referees: Biniam Maru, Kalume Tonton Banza, Dorothy Okatch

17 March 2023	AS Douanes (Senegal)	74–58	(Mali) Stade Malien	Dakar Arena, Dakar
19:30	Scoring by quarter: 21–17, 12–12, 14–13, 27–16
	Pts: Crawford 21; Rebs: Ndiaye 8 Asts: Ndour 5	Boxscore	Pts: Berthe 17; Rebs: Diarra 14; Asts: Mamadou Keita 4	Attendance: 3,059

18 March 2023	Stade Malien (Mali)	84–64	(Rwanda) REG	Dakar Arena, Dakar
14:00	Scoring by quarter: 22–12, 15–20, 23–17, 24–15
	Pts: Berthe 23; Rebs: Diarra 16; Asts: Amayo 6	Boxscore	Pts: Filer 19; Rebs: Chomche 9 Asts: Thomas 10	Attendance: 650; Referees: Biniam Maru, Aboolo Amr, Dorothy Okatch

21 March 2023	ABC Fighters (Ivory Coast)	71–90	(Mali) Stade Malien	Dakar Arena, Dakar
16:00	Scoring by quarter: 10–18, 18–25, 13–22, 30–25
	Pts: Konaté 19; Rebs: Robinson, Konaté 8 Asts: Robinson 8	Livestats	Pts: Diarra 22; Rebs: Chinyelu 13; Asts: Berthé 7	Attendance: 1,567; Referees: Stephanie Barksdale, Antonio Bernardo, Arnold Moseya

==== Playoffs ====
===== Quarterfinal =====
21 May 2023	Stade Malien (Mali)	78–69	(South Africa) Cape Town Tigers	BK Arena, Kigali
19:00	Scoring by quarter: 31–15, 17–15, 16–22, 14–17
	Pts: Diarra, Wilkins 18; Rebs: Diarra 13; Asts: Foster 7	Report	Pts: Prinsloo 19; Rebs: Gbinije 13; Asts: Gbinije 5	Attendance: 3,632; Referees: Hortencia Sanchez-Carrizales, Jean Sauveur Ruhamiriza, Leslie Cherubin

===== Semifinal =====
24 May 2023	Stade Malien (Mali)	73–78	(Egypt) Al Ahly	BK Arena, Kigali
20:30	Scoring by quarter: 17–17, 21–16, 15–25, 20–20
	Pts: Amayo 15; Rebs: Diarra 11; Asts: Foster 6	Livestats	Pts: Amin 21; Rebs: Amin 6 Asts: Thompson 4	Attendance: 6,102; Referees: Klyde Mulla, Jean Sauveur Ruhamiriza, Annie Joyce Muchenu

===== Third place game =====
26 May 2023	Petro de Luanda (Angola)	65–73	(Mali) Stade Malien	BK Arena, Kigali
18:00	Scoring by quarter: 15–20, 19–16, 20–14, 11–23
	Pts: Morais 15; Rebs: Morais 9 Asts: Morais, Diabate 4	Livestats	Pts: Diarra 25; Rebs: Diarra 12; Asts: Three players 5	Referees: Hortensia Sanchez-Carrizales, Marie Leslie Cherubin, Mbaye Seye
