= List of football clubs in Mali =

The following is an incomplete list of association football clubs based in Mali. For a complete list see Category:Football clubs in Mali

== A ==
- Africa Sports de Gao
- Atar Club
- Avenir (Ségou)
- Avenir AC (Timbuktu)

== B ==
- AS Bakaridjan de Barouéli (Ségou)
- AS Bamako (Bamako)
- AS Biton (Ségou)
- US Bougouni

== C ==
- CAS de Sévaré
- JS Centre Salif Keita (Bamako)
- Cercle Olympique de Bamako (Bamako) - abbreviation and common form: COB

== D ==
- Débo Club de Mopti
- Djoliba AC (Bamako)
- CS Duguwolofila de Babanba (Koulikoro)

== F ==
- al Farouk (Timbuktu)

== J ==
- Jeanne d'Arc FC
- Jeunesse Sportive (Ségou)

== K ==
- Kayésienne - now part of AS Sigui
- Association Sportive de Korofina (Bamako)

== M ==
- Mamahira AC (Kati)
- AS Mandé (Bamako)
- AS Mandé (women) (Bamako)

== N ==
- AS Nianan (Koulikoro)

== O ==
- Office du Niger Sports
- AS Olympique de Messira
- Onze Créateurs de Niaréla (Bamako)

== P ==
- AS Police (Bamako)

== R ==
- Real Bamako, Association Sportive (Bamako)

== S ==
- Sabana
- AS Sigui - Kayés
- Sonni AC (Gao)
- Stade Malien (Bamako)
- Stade Malien de Sikasso

== T ==
- AS Tata National (Sikasso)
- Tibo Club (Mopti)

== U ==
- Union Sportive des Forces Armées et Sécurité de Bamako

== Y ==
- Yeelen Olympique

== Women's clubs ==
- AS Mandé (women)
