= List of football stadiums in Mali =

This is a list of football venues in Mali: These are stadiums where professional and semi-professional association football clubs in Mali play. A minimum capacity of 5,000 is required.

== Current stadiums ==
#	Image	Stadium	Capacity	City	Home team(s)
1		Stade 26 mars	50,000	Bamako	CO Bamako, Djoliba AC, Stade Malien
2		Stade Modibo Kéïta	35,000	Bamako	AS Real Bamako
3		Stade Babemba Traoré	30,000	Sikasso	
4		Stade Abdoulaye Nakoro Cissoko	30,000	Kayes	
5		Stade Amari Daou	30,000	Ségou	
6		Stade Baréma Bocoum	30,000	Mopti	
7		Stade Municipal de Koulikoro	8,000	Koulikoro	Duguwolofila, AS Nianan, Mamahira Kati
8		Stade Taïkiri	6,000	Mopti	
9		Complex Sportif Hérémakono	5,000	Bamako	Djoliba AC^{1}
10		Stade Municipal de Bamako	5,000	Bamako	AS Bamako, Stade Malien
11		Stade Municipal de USFAS	5,000	Bamako	USFAS Bamako
12		Mano Dayak Stadium	5,000	Kidal	Elewidj FC, Atar Club Kidal

^{1}Used for training

== See also ==
- List of association football stadiums by capacity
- List of African stadiums by capacity
- Lists of stadiums
