= 2012–13 Malian Première Division =

Malian Première Division
- Season: 2012–13
- Champions: Stade Malien
- Promoted: Office du Niger Sports; Atar Club; USFAS Bamako
- Relegated: AS Korofina; Jeanne d'Arc FC; Atar Club
- 2014 CAF Champions League: Stade Malien; Djoliba AC
- 2014 CAF Confederation Cup: AS Real Bamako; CO Bamako
- Goals: 516

The 2012–13 Malian Première Division is the 48th edition of the highest club level football competition in Mali. Stade Malien won their 18th national title and qualified into the 2014 CAF Champions League the following season. Real Bamako also qualified into the CAF Champions League the following season. As Stade Malien were also cup winners, third place Djoliba qualified and also qualified CO Bamako.

== Overview ==
Djoliba AC was the defender of the title. It was the first season that featured 16 teams and had 30 rounds with a total of 240 matches, 516 goals were scored and its average goals per match was more than two.

== Standings ==
| Pos | Team | Pld | W | D | L | GF | GA | GD | Pts | Qualification or relegation |
|---|---|---|---|---|---|---|---|---|---|---|
| 1 | Stade Malien | 30 | 25 | 4 | 1 | 56 | 14 | +42 | 79 | 2014 CAF Champions League |
| 2 | AS Real Bamako | 30 | 17 | 8 | 5 | 51 | 28 | +23 | 59 | 2014 CAF Champions League |
| 3 | Djoliba AC | 30 | 15 | 10 | 5 | 47 | 19 | +28 | 55 | 2014 CAF Confederation Cup |
| 4 | Cercle Olympique de Bamako | 29 | 15 | 10 | 4 | 37 | 23 | +14 | 55 | 2014 CAF Confederation Cup |
| 5 | Onze Créateurs de Niaréla | 30 | 13 | 7 | 10 | 40 | 28 | +12 | 46 | |
| 6 | AS Nianan | 30 | 13 | 4 | 13 | 33 | 32 | +1 | 43 | |
| 7 | AS Bakaridjan | 30 | 11 | 8 | 11 | 23 | 22 | +1 | 41 | |
| 8 | CS Duguwolofila | 30 | 10 | 8 | 12 | 20 | 30 | −10 | 38 | |
| 9 | USFAS Bamako | 30 | 9 | 9 | 12 | 28 | 32 | −4 | 36 | |
| 10 | AS Olympique de Messira | 30 | 9 | 9 | 12 | 30 | 37 | −7 | 36 | |
| 11 | Centre Salif Kéïta | 30 | 9 | 7 | 14 | 25 | 30 | −5 | 34 | |
| 12 | Office du Niger Sports | 30 | 9 | 7 | 14 | 23 | 39 | −16 | 34 | |
| 13 | AS Bamako | 30 | 9 | 6 | 15 | 36 | 36 | 0 | 33 | |
| 14 | AS Korofina | 30 | 8 | 8 | 14 | 32 | 36 | −4 | 32 | |
| 15 | Jeanne d'Arc FC | 30 | 7 | 9 | 14 | 21 | 41 | −20 | 30 | |
| 16 | Atar Club | 30 | 2 | 4 | 24 | 14 | 69 | −55 | 10 | |

Updated to match(es) played on 10 August 2013. Source: Soccerway
Rules for classification: 1) points; 2) goal difference; 3) number of goals scored.
