= Football in Mali =

- Country: Mali
- Governing body: Malian Football Federation
- National team: men's national team
- Clubs: Malien Premiere Division

International competitions
- Champions League; CAF Confederation Cup; Super Cup; FIFA Club World Cup; FIFA World Cup (National Team); African Cup of Nations (National Team)

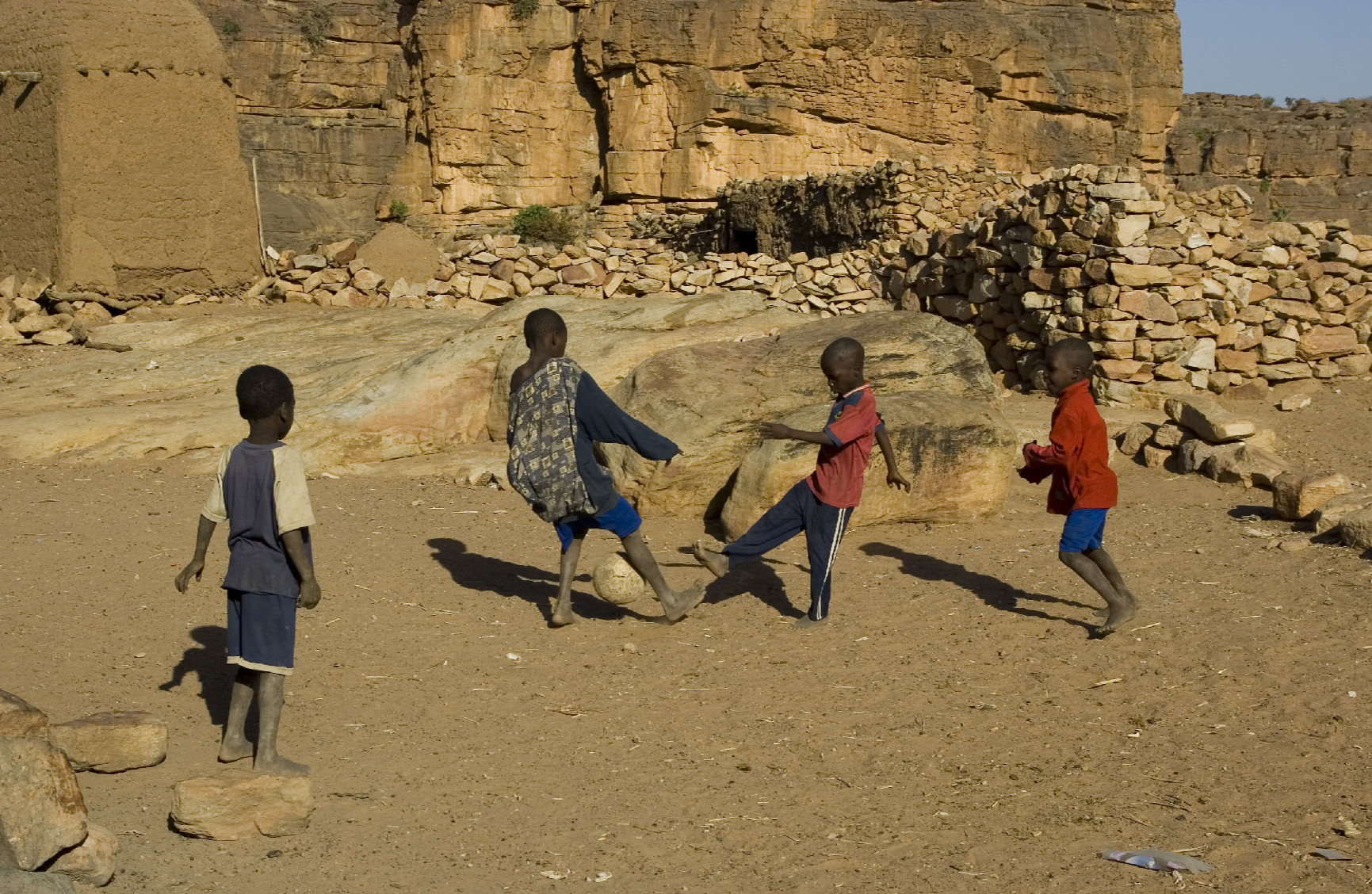
Malian children playing football.

Association football is the most popular sport in the country of Mali. Approximately 40% of the people in Mali are interested in football. Large professional clubs and international competitions draw much attention, and the sport is played as a pastime.

== Popularity ==
The most popular sport in Mali is football, which rose to the level of national obsession when Mali was chosen to host the 2002 African Cup of Nations. Most towns have professional or semi-professional men's clubs which play in one national (professional) league and two regional (semi professional) leagues. A majority of clubs are based in Bamako, the capital city, and the most popular teams nationally, Djoliba AC, Stade Malien, and Real Bamako, all play there.

People play football widely, with formal fields in almost every town of any size, and pickup games among children common in a country with few luxuries. Informal games are often played by youths using a bundle of rags as a ball.

== Professional game ==
Men's football has so far outpaced the women's game—or any other sport—as the focus of public attention as a spectator sport.

=== History ===
The French introduced the game to what was then French Soudan in the early 20th century, and the first organised leagues open to Africans appeared in the 1930s. Jeanne d'Arc du Soudan, founded in 1938 by two French-Africans and the missionary Révérend Père Bouvier, borrowed its name from the Senegalese club Jeanne d'Arc Dakar, and was originally a club of mixed race Bamako Metis playing against white colonials. A handful of African clubs developed after the Second World War, competing locally and against teams from around French West Africa, dominated by the clubs of Senegal. Foyer du Soudan (later Djoliba AC) and JA du Soudan competed in the French West African Cup from the late 1940s until 1959, as well as local leagues (Bamako League) and the "coupe du Soudan" (1947-1959).

=== Domestic league ===
At independence, the new government reorganised the sport leagues, combining a number of the larger teams with nearby clubs. Most notably, two Bamako clubs fused into teams which still dominate national sport, to become Djoliba Athletic Club and Stade Malien de Bamako in 1960. In the first Coupe du Mali, Stade and Djoliba reached the two match final in 1961. Tied 3-3 after the first match, Stade carried the cup 2-1 in the second.

Stade were also the first Malian club to reach the final of the African Cup of Champions Clubs in 1964/5, losing 2-1 to Oryx Douala.

The great Salif Keita brought AS Real Bamako dominance in his time there (1963-1967). He later moved on to France, becoming the first Malian star player in Europe while at AS Saint-Étienne and Olympique de Marseille. At Saint-Étienne, Keita won the African Footballer of the Year in 1970, the first Malian to win the award, and later played in Spain, Portugal, and the United States.

New clubs have appeared, but the three big Bamako clubs have maintained a strangle on Malian football. Every top division league title since 1966 has been won by one of these Stade, Djoliba, or Real, and all but five times since 1961 have these clubs won the Coupe du Mali.

=== Overseas players ===
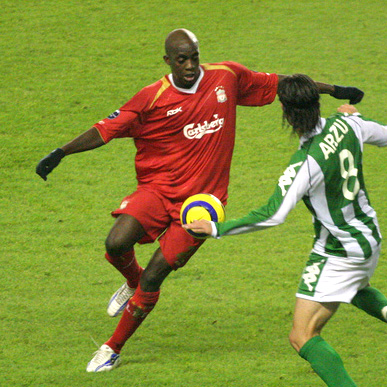
Mohamed Sissoko playing at Liverpool F.C., November 2005. The success of Malian players abroad encourages young men in one of the world's poorest nations to pursue football.

In a path blazed by Keita, the country has produced several other notable players for French teams, including Jean Tigana, and Frédéric "Fredi" Kanouté, named 2007 African Footballer of the Year, but latterly elected to play for Mali instead. Mahamadou Diarra, the captain of the Mali national team, played for Real Madrid for four seasons before moving to AS Monaco and Seydou Keita plays for AS Roma. Other notable players currently on European squads include, Drissa Diakité (SC Bastia), Modibo Maïga (West Ham United), Adama Coulibaly (Valenciennes FC), Cheick Diabaté (FC Girondins de Bordeaux), and Yacouba Sylla (Stade Rennais F.C.).

== Attendances ==
The average attendance per top-flight football league season and the club with the highest average attendance:

Season	League average	Best club	Best club average
2023-24	576	Stade Malien	2,711

Source: League page on Wikipedia

== See also ==
- List of Malian football clubs
- List of Malian football competitions
- List of Malian football referees
- List of Malian footballers
- List of Football venues in Mali
- 2002 African Cup of Nations: hosted by Mali
- Malian Football Federation
- Mali national football team
