= Mamadou Keita (basketball) =

Malian basketball player (born 1993)

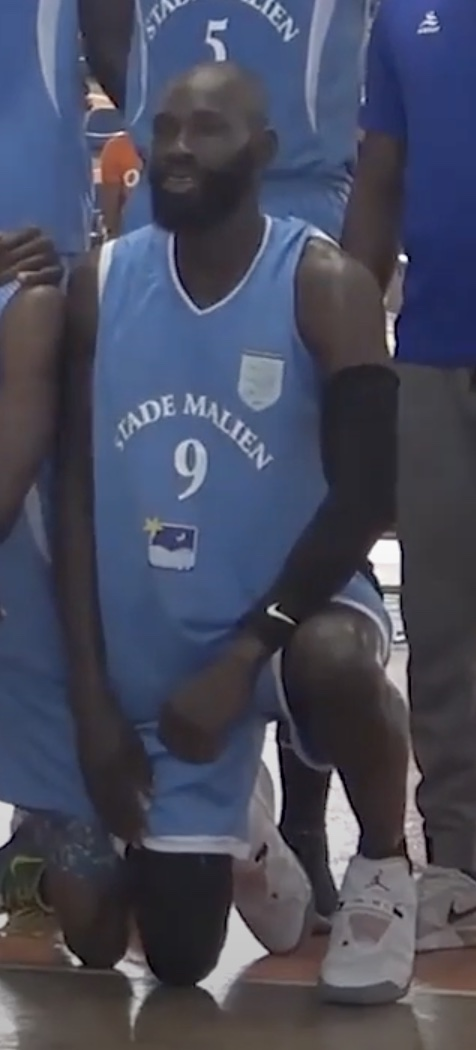
- Keita in 2023

No. 10 – Stade Malien
- Position: Shooting guard / point guard
- League: Road to BAL

Personal information
- Born: 1 February 1993 (age 33) Bamako, Mali
- Listed height: 1.93 m (6 ft 4 in)
- Listed weight: 94 kg (207 lb)

Career information
- NBA draft: 2015: undrafted

Career history
- USFAS Bamako
- 2018–2019: OS Bordj Bou Arréridj
- 2019–2021: AS Police
- 2021: SLAC
- 2022–present: Stade Malien

Career highlights
- Malian League MVP (2018); 4× Malian League champion (2019, 2020, 2022, 2023); Malian Cup champion (2020)

Mamadou Keita (born 1 February 1993) is a Malian basketball player who plays for Stade Malien of the Ligue 1 and plays for the Mali national basketball team. Standing at 1.93 m (6 ft 4 in), he plays as shooting guard or point guard.

== Professional career ==
Keita started his career with USFAS Bamako and was the MVP of the Malian Ligue 1 in the 2017–18 season.

In the 2018–19 season, Keita played in Algeria with OS Bordj Bou Arréridj.

In 2019, Keita joined the AS Police and helped them qualify for the inaugural season of the Basketball Africa League (BAL). He was also on the Police roster for the 2021 BAL season and average 14.3 points in three group stage games.

In October 2021, Keita was on the roster of Guinean champions SLAC to play in the 2022 BAL Qualifying Tournaments.

In 2022, he joined Stade Malien.

== National team career ==
Keita has been a member of the Mali national basketball team. He played at 2017 AfroBasket, 2019 FIBA AfroCan and 2021 AfroBasket.

== BAL career statistics ==
Legend
GP	Games played	GS	Games started	MPG	Minutes per game
FG%	Field goal percentage	3P%	3-point field goal percentage	FT%	Free throw percentage
RPG	Rebounds per game	APG	Assists per game	SPG	Steals per game
BPG	Blocks per game	PPG	Points per game	**Bold**	Career high

Year	Team	GP	GS	MPG	FG%	3P%	FT%	RPG	APG	SPG	BPG	PPG
2021	AS Police	3	3	27.7	.410	.400	1.000	3.0	1.3	1.7	.0	14.3
2023	Stade Malien	8	0	18.6	.276	.244	.667	2.3	1.3	1.6	.0	5.5

== Honours ==
AS Police

- Ligue 1: 2019, 2020
- Malian Cup: 2020

Stade Malien

- Ligue 1: 2022

Individual

- Ligue 1 Most Valuable Player: 2017
