= Souleymane Berthé =

Malian basketball player (born 2000)

Souleymane Berthe
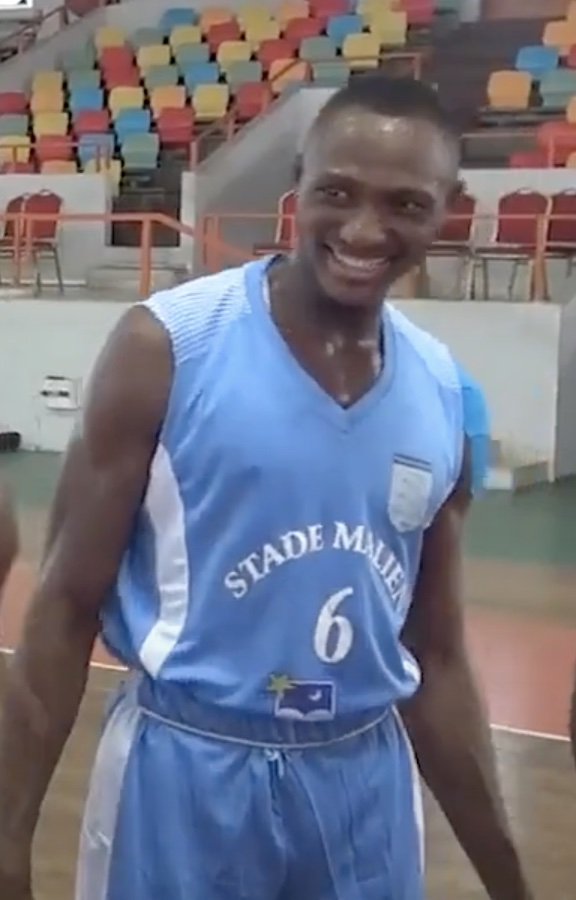
- Berthe with Stade Malien in 2023

CRB Tombouctou
- Position: Small forward
- League: Nationale 3

Personal information
- Born: 5 October 2000 (age 25)
- Listed height: 2.00 m (6 ft 7 in)

Career information
- Playing career: 2022–present

Career history
- 2022–2023: Stade Malien
- 2023–2025: Cherbourg
- 2025: AS Panazol Basket
- 2025: CRB Tombouctou

Career highlights
- Ligue 1 champion (2022); Malian Cup winner (2023); Malian Super Cup winner (2023)

Souleymane Berthé (born 5 October 2000) is a Malian professional basketball player who last played for CRB Tombouctou. He plays as small forward. He also plays for the Mali national team.

== Early life ==
Berthé grew up playing soccer but switched to basketball after he was inspired by a neighbour who played basketball. He then went on to play pick-up games at the courts of Bamako, where he was eventually recruited by coach Kaba Kanté of Stade Malien.

== Club career ==
Berthe played for Stade Malien and helped the team win the Ligue 1 championship in 2022. As a result, he played in the Road to BAL 2023 where he averaged 14.8 points and 5.3 rebounds, helping Stade qualify for their first-ever BAL season.

On 13 March 2023, Berthe made his BAL debut against the defending champions US Monastir and scored 34 points in the 68–78 loss, the second most points scored by a player in the league's three-year history behind Terrell Stoglin's 41 points. His debut performance received league wide attention. Stade Malien eventually finished in the third place, and Berthé averaged 16.4 points in eight games. Berthé left the team after the season.

On 13 July 2023, Berthé signed with Cherbourg of the Nationale 3, the fifth division of basketball in France.

In November 2025, he was on the roster of CRB Tombouctou in the Road to BAL 2026, but played a minor role, averaging 3.3 points per game.

== National team career ==
Berthé made his debut with the Mali national team on February 22, 2025, in the AfroBasket 2025 qualification games.

== Personal ==
Souleymane's sisters Saran, Dioume and Rokiatou Berthe have all played for Mali national youth teams.

== BAL career statistics ==
Legend
| GP | Games played | GS | Games started | MPG | Minutes per game |
| FG% | Field goal percentage | 3P% | 3-point field goal percentage | FT% | Free throw percentage |
| RPG | Rebounds per game | APG | Assists per game | SPG | Steals per game |
| BPG | Blocks per game | PPG | Points per game | **Bold** | Career high |

| Year | Team | GP | GS | MPG | FG% | 3P% | FT% | RPG | APG | SPG | BPG | PPG |
|---|---|---|---|---|---|---|---|---|---|---|---|---|
| 2023 | Stade Malien | 8 | 8 | 30.8 | .341 | .210 | .711 | 4.4 | 4.0 | 1.6 | .1 | 16.4 |
