= Taévaunn Prince =

Canadian-Jamaican basketball player (born 1991)

Personal information
- Born: July 6, 1991 (age 35) Toronto, Ontario, Canada
- Listed height: 6 ft 3 in (1.91 m)
- Listed weight: 210 lb (95 kg)

Career information
- High school: Father Henry Carr Catholic Secondary School; (Toronto, Ontario): St. Mary's Ryken (Leonardtown, Maryland); Proctor Academy (Andover, New Hampshire)
- College: South Dakota State (2011–2013); Missouri Southern (2014–2016)
- NBA draft: 2016: undrafted
- Playing career: 2016–present
- Position: Combo guard

Career history
- 2016–2017: Scanplus Baskets Elchingen
- 2018–2020: Clínica Ponferrada CDP
- 2021–2022: AS Police
- 2023-2024: Diablos de Miranda

Career highlights
- All Spanish Team (2019); All German Team (2017); NCAA Division II Scoring Leader (2016); NABC First-team All-American (2016); First-team All-MIAA (2016); Second-team All-MIAA (2015); NCAA Division 1 Summit League Champion (2013); NCAA Division 1 Summit League Champion (2012); McDonald's High School All-American Nominee (2010)

Taévaunn Prince (born July 6, 1991) is a former Canadian-Jamaican NCAA and overseas professional basketball player. Born and raised in Toronto, Prince began his high school career at Father Henry Carr Catholic Secondary School before moving to the United States. He spent his sophomore year at St. Mary’s Ryken High School in Maryland, competing in the Washington Catholic Athletic Conference (WCAC), one of the country’s most competitive high school basketball conferences. During that season, Prince was ranked among the Washington metropolitan area’s Top 25 players by DCSportsFan.com.

Prince transferred to Proctor Academy in New Hampshire for his junior and senior seasons. At Proctor, he competed in the New England Preparatory School Athletic Council (NEPSAC), a conference known for its high level of basketball and academically rigorous preparatory schools. He emerged as a standout player in New England and was nominated for the 2010 McDonald’s All-American Game, although he was not selected for the final roster.

Prince earned an NCAA Division I scholarship to South Dakota State University. During his freshman season, he was among the finalists for Summit League Freshman of the Year and contributed to the first of consecutive Summit League championship teams. He was a member of South Dakota State teams that reached the NCAA Division I men’s basketball tournament in consecutive seasons, including the program’s first March Madness appearance.

Following his sophomore season, Prince transferred to NCAA Division II Missouri Southern State University, where he developed into one of the leading players in the country. After redshirting his first season, he earned Second Team All-MIAA honours as a junior. Prince then produced a nationally recognized senior season in 2015–16, earning unanimous First Team All-MIAA, First Team All-Region and All-District honours. He received multiple All-American selections, including being named an NABC First Team All-American, and became one of 13 finalists for the Bevo Francis Award.

Prince led NCAA Division II in scoring at more than 26 points per game and finished his career holding Missouri Southern records for single-season scoring average, career scoring average and the most points scored by a two-year player. His collegiate career concluded with an appearance in the 2016 Reese’s NABC Division II College All-Star Game, where he represented the West team.

After completing his collegiate career, Prince played professionally across Europe, Africa and South America, including stops in Germany, Spain, Mali, Cameroon and Venezuela. He also represented Jamaica internationally in 3x3 basketball, helping the country advance beyond the preliminary round and finish sixth at the inaugural FIBA 3x3 AmeriCup in 2021. The result remains Jamaica’s highest finish in the history of the competition.

== Professional career ==
After going undrafted in the 2016 NBA draft, Prince began a seven-year international career by signing with ScanPlus Baskets Elchingen of Germany’s ProB. In his professional debut, he scored 24 points in a 105–74 victory over Würzburg.[1] He recorded his first professional double-double with 29 points and 10 rebounds in a 97–92 win over the Licher BasketBären.[2] Prince led Elchingen in scoring and helped the club reach the playoffs.

He later continued his career in Spain’s FEB leagues, where he led his team in scoring and efficiency. Prince also competed in Africa during the Basketball Africa League qualification stage before playing in Venezuela’s top professional league, where he contributed as an efficient scorer and helped his club secure a playoff berth.

== 3x3 career ==
Prince represented the Jamaica men’s national 3x3 team at the inaugural FIBA 3x3 AmeriCup in November 2021. Held at Bayfront Park in Miami, the tournament marked the first continental national-team championship for 3x3 basketball in the Americas. Jamaica advanced beyond the preliminary stage and finished sixth overall, drawing attention to the country’s emerging presence in international 3x3 basketball. The result remains Jamaica’s highest finish in the history of the competition.[1]

== Personal life ==
His motto in life is "My motto is do or die. Everything I approach is do or die; my contract is do or die. It's an underdog mentality, and I'm just trying to get to the top."
