= USFAS Bamako (basketball) =

- League: Ligue 1
- Founded: 1965
- Location: Bamako, Mali

Union Sportive des Forces Armées et Sécurité de Bamako, better known as USFAS Bamako is a Malian basketball club based in Bamako. Established in 1965, the team plays in the Ligue 1 and has won one national championship and two Malian Cups in its history.

== Honours ==
Ligue 1

- Champions (1): 2017–18

Malian Cup

- Winners (2): 1985, 2017

== Notable players ==
- Mamadou Keita
