= NABC Defensive Player of the Year =

College men's basketball defensive player of the year award

- Awarded for: the most outstanding men's defensive basketball player in NCAA Division I
- Country: United States
- Presented by: NABC

History
- First award: 1987
- Most recent: Rueben Chinyelu, Florida
- Website: Official website

The NABC Defensive Player of the Year is a college basketball award given annually by the National Association of Basketball Coaches (NABC) to recognize the top men's defensive player in NCAA Division I competition. It has been given since 1987 and was previously known as the Henry Iba Corinthian Award, named after Naismith Hall of Fame coach Henry Iba, who coached at Oklahoma State from 1934 to 1970.

Duke has dominated the award with six recipients who have won a total of nine awards. The only other schools with more than one recipient are UConn, with two recipients who combined for four awards, and Ohio State, Kentucky, and Virginia with two recipients who each won the award once. Three players have been named the NABC Defensive Player of the Year on three occasions—Stacey Augmon of UNLV (1989–1991), Tim Duncan of Wake Forest (1995–1997), and Shane Battier of Duke (1999–2001). Greg Oden (2007) and Anthony Davis (2012) are the only freshmen to have won the award.

Four winners of this award were born outside the main territory of the United States. Duncan was born in the United States Virgin Islands, an insular area of the U.S.; by U.S. law, all natives of the USVI are U.S. citizens by birth. Hasheem Thabeet, the 2008 and 2009 winner, is a native of Tanzania. Udoka Azubuike and Rueben Chinyelu, respectively the 2020 and 2026 recipients, were born in Nigeria.

== Key ==
†	Co-Players of the Year
*	Awarded a national player of the year award that same season: Sporting News; Oscar Robertson Trophy; Associated Press; NABC; UPI; Naismith; Wooden; Adolph Rupp Trophy
Player (X)	Denotes the number of times the player has been awarded the NABC DPOY award at that point

== Winners ==
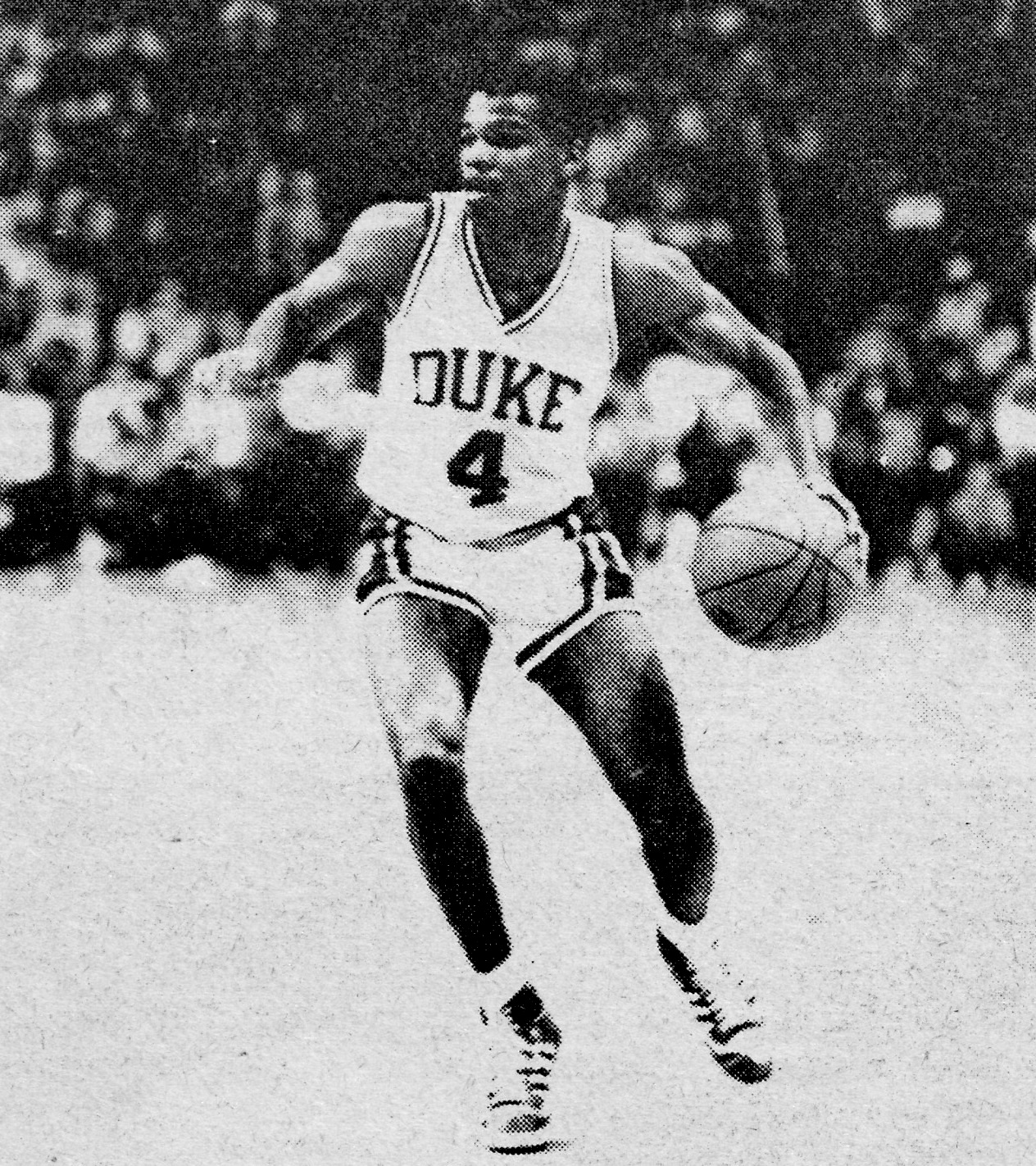
Tommy Amaker, Duke, 1987

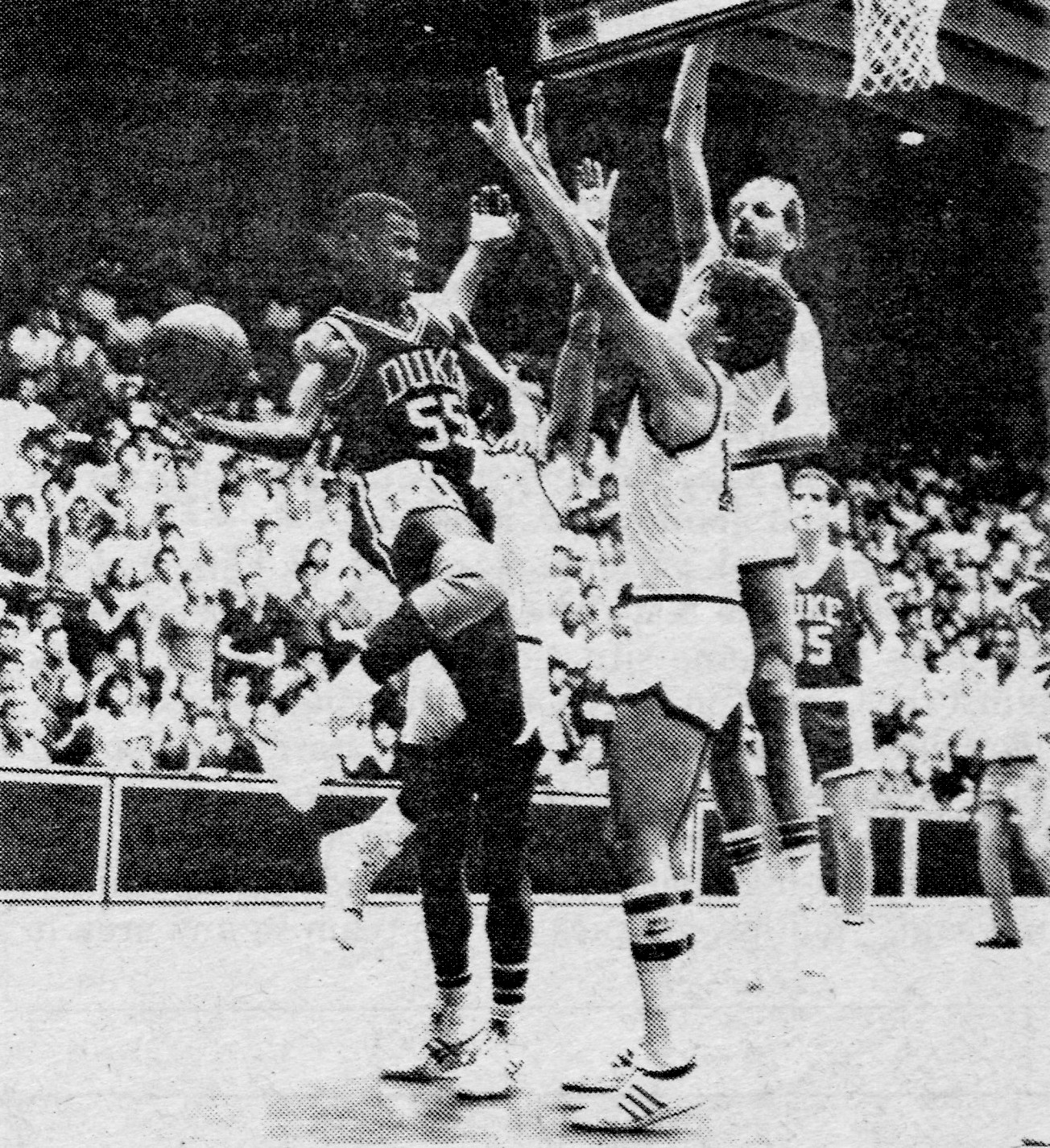
Billy King, Duke, 1988

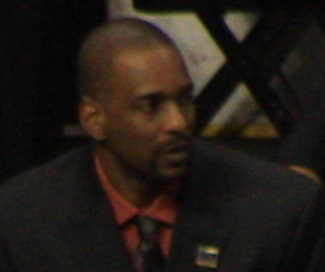
Stacey Augmon, UNLV, 1989 through 1991

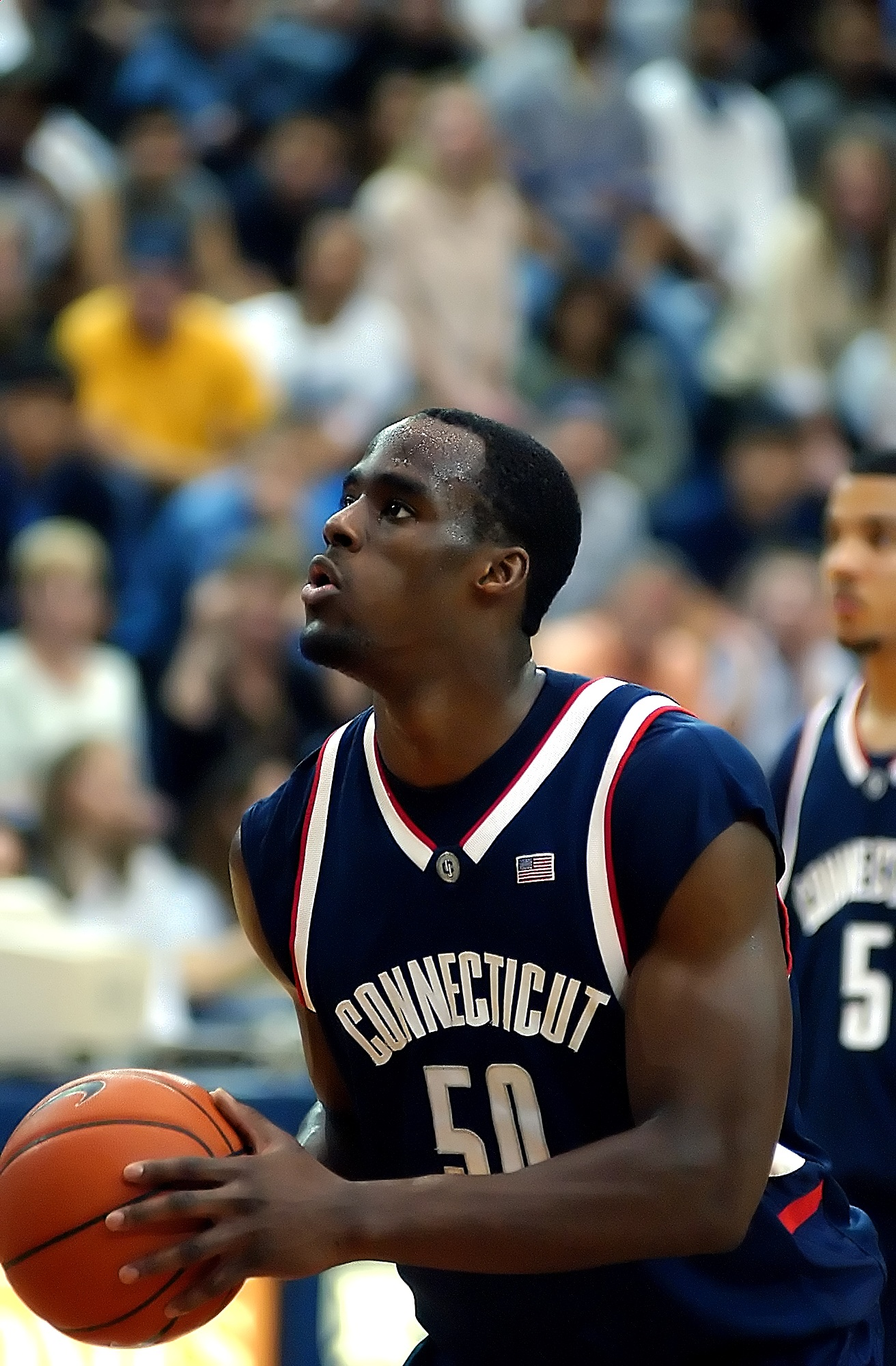
Emeka Okafor, UConn, 2003 and 2004

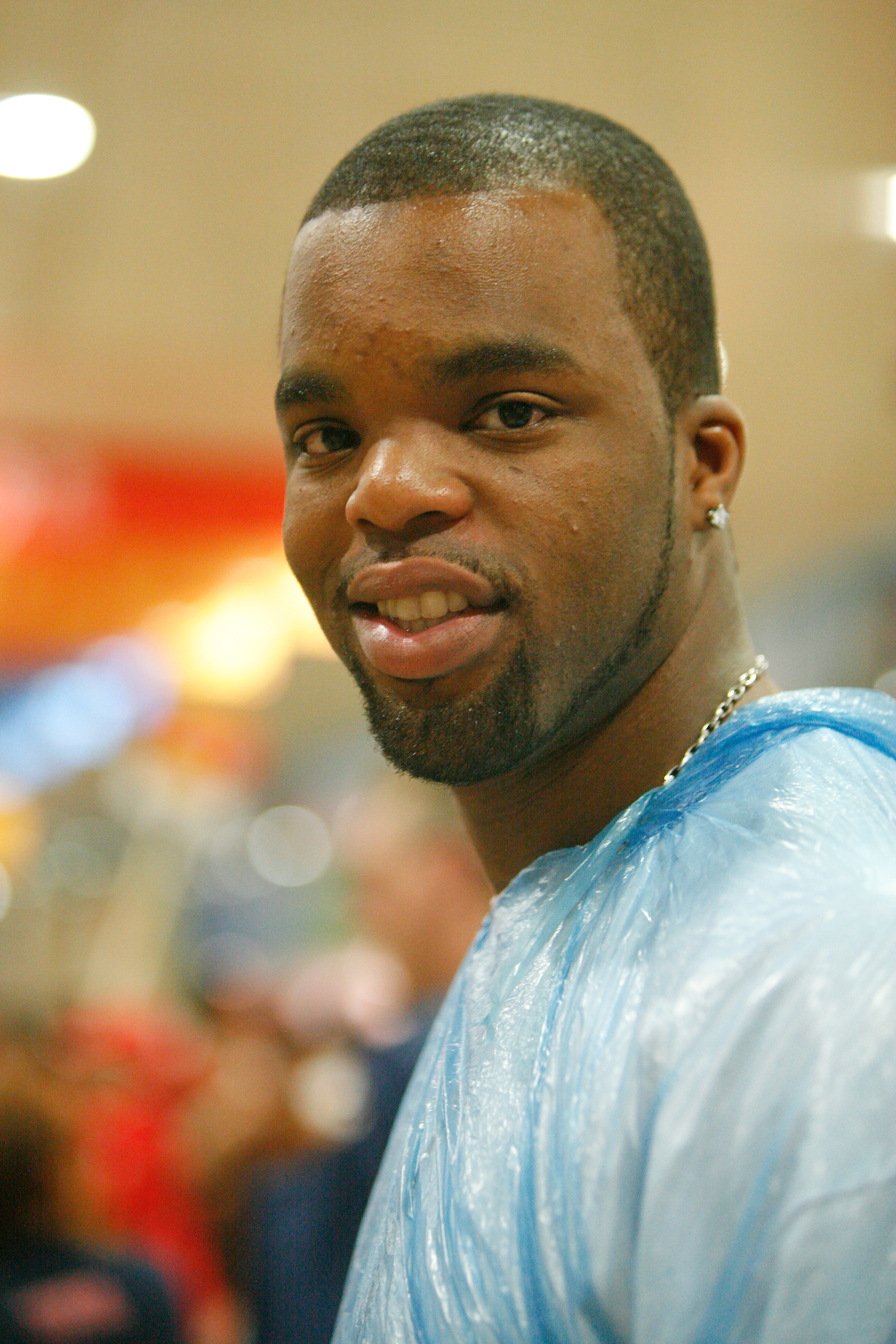
Sheldon Williams, Duke, 2005 and 2006

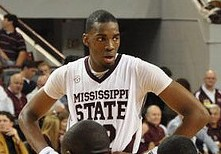
Jarvis Varnado, Mississippi State, 2010

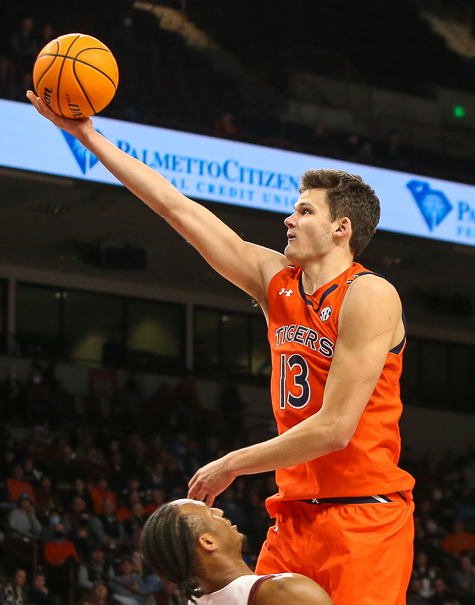
Walker Kessler, Auburn, 2022

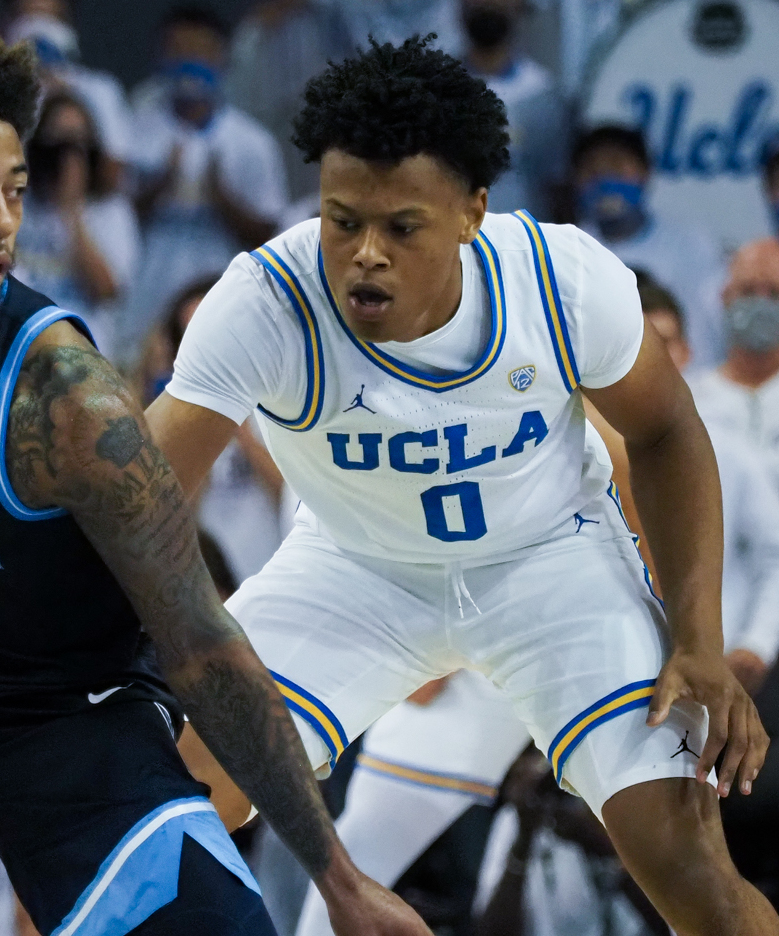
Jaylen Clark, UCLA, 2023

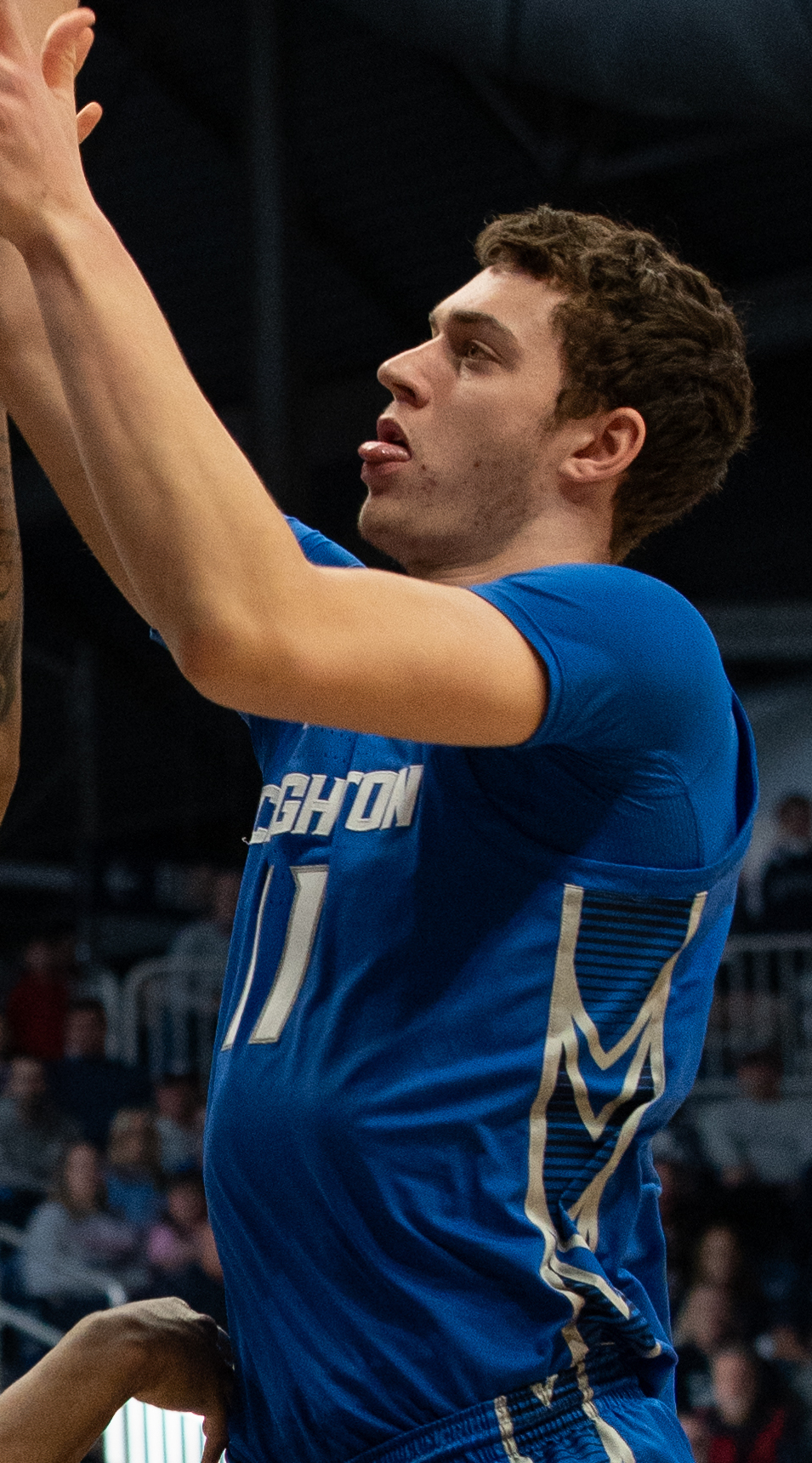
Ryan Kalkbrenner, Creighton, 2025

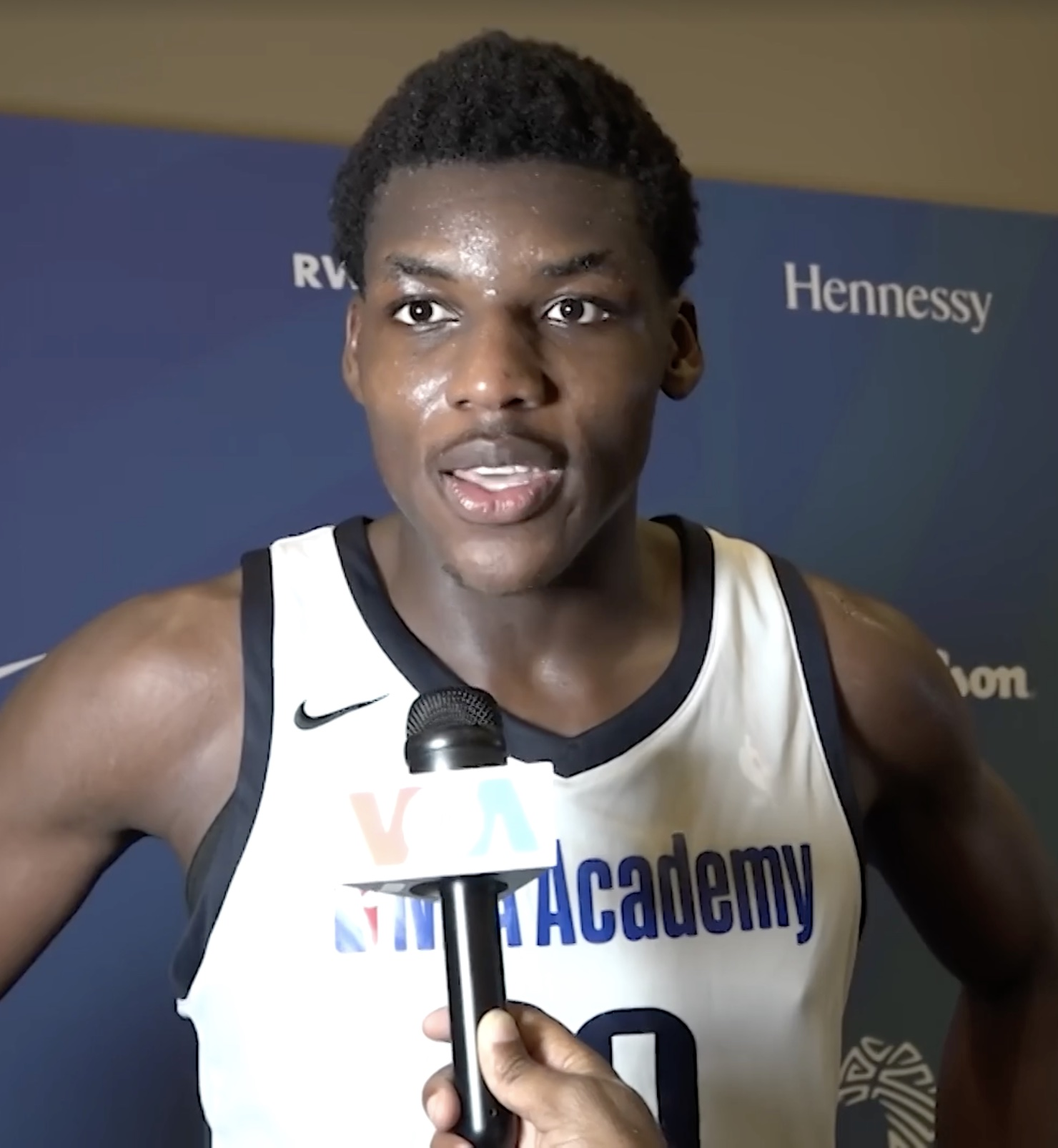
Rueben Chinyelu, Florida, 2026

Season	Player	School	Position	Class	Reference
1986–87	Tommy Amaker	Duke	PG	Senior	
1987–88	Billy King	Duke	F	Senior	
1988–89	Stacey Augmon	UNLV	SF	Sophomore	
1989–90	Stacey Augmon (2)	UNLV	SF	Junior	
1990–91	Stacey Augmon (3)	UNLV	SF	Senior	
1991–92	Alonzo Mourning	Georgetown	C	Senior	
1992–93	Grant Hill	Duke	SF	Junior	
1993–94	Jim McIlvaine	Marquette	C	Senior	
1994–95	Tim Duncan	Wake Forest	C	Sophomore	
1995–96	Tim Duncan (2)	Wake Forest	C	Junior	
1996–97	Tim Duncan* (3)	Wake Forest	C	Senior	
1997–98	Steve Wojciechowski	Duke	SG	Senior	
1998–99	Shane Battier	Duke	SF	Sophomore	
1999–00^{†}	Shane Battier (2)	Duke	SF	Junior	
1999–00^{†}	Kenyon Martin*	Cincinnati	C	Senior	
2000–01	Shane Battier* (3)	Duke	SF	Senior	
2001–02	John Linehan	Providence	PG	Senior	
2002–03	Emeka Okafor	UConn	C	Sophomore	
2003–04	Emeka Okafor* (2)	UConn	C	Junior	
2004–05	Shelden Williams	Duke	PF	Junior	
2005–06	Shelden Williams (2)	Duke	PF	Senior	
2006–07	Greg Oden	Ohio State	C	Freshman	
2007–08	Hasheem Thabeet	UConn	C	Sophomore	
2008–09	Hasheem Thabeet (2)	UConn	C	Junior	
2009–10	Jarvis Varnado	Mississippi State	C	Senior	
2010–11	Kenneth Faried	Morehead State	PF / C	Senior	
2011–12	Anthony Davis*	Kentucky	C	Freshman	
2012–13^{†}	Victor Oladipo*	Indiana	SG	Junior	
2012–13^{†}	Jeff Withey	Kansas	C	Senior	
2013–14	Aaron Craft	Ohio State	PG	Senior	
2014–15	Willie Cauley-Stein	Kentucky	PF / C	Junior	
2015–16	Malcolm Brogdon	Virginia	SG	Senior	
2016–17	Jevon Carter	West Virginia	PG	Junior	
2017–18	Jevon Carter (2)	West Virginia	PG	Senior	
2018–19	De'Andre Hunter	Virginia	SF	Sophomore	
2019–20	Udoka Azubuike	Kansas	C	Senior	
2020–21	Davion Mitchell	Baylor	PG	Junior	
2021–22	Walker Kessler	Auburn	C	Sophomore	
2022–23	Jaylen Clark	UCLA	SG	Junior	
2023–24	Jamal Shead	Houston	PG	Senior	
2024–25	Ryan Kalkbrenner	Creighton	C	Senior	
2025–26	Rueben Chinyelu	Florida	C	Junior	
