= Mano Dayak Stadium =

Football stadium in Kidal, Mali

Mano Dayak Stadium ⵎⴰⵏⵓ ⴹⴰⵢⴰⴾ
- Kidal Municipal Stadium
- Location within Mali
- Full name: Mano Dayak Stadium
- Location: RN18; Kidal, Mali
- Coordinates: 18°26′39″N 1°23′58″E
- Surface: Sand

Tenants
- Elewidj FC; Atar Club Kidal; Tarawant AC

Mano Dayak Stadium is located in the center of Kidal, Mali. It is the home stadium for AS Elewidj FC, Atar Club Kidal, and Tarawant AC.

== Name of the stadium ==
The stadium was nicknamed Kidal Municipal Stadium

The stadium is named after Mano Dayak in memory of a famous Tuareg freedom fighter, leader, activist, scholar and negotiator. He led the Tuareg Rebellion in Ténéré region, northern Niger during the 1990s.

The stadium has hosted various public and community events in Kidal. In February 2023, political movements from northern Mali held a fusion ceremony at the stadium.

In 2022, local football tournaments, including Ramadan competitions, were organized at the stadium.
