= Stade Malien (basketball) =

- Nickname: Blancs de Bamako (Whites of Bamako)
- League: Ligue 1 BAL
- Established: 28 August 1960; 65 years ago
- History: Stade Malien (1960–present)
- Arena: Palais des Sports Salamatou Maiga
- Capacity: 8,000
- Location: Bamako, Mali
- President: Mahamadou Samaké
- General manager: Moustapha Touré
- Head coach: Boubacar Kanouté
- Championships: 19 Ligue 1; 25 Malian Cups

Stade Malien is a Malian basketball team based in Bamako. It is part of the multi-sports club, which also has a football team and rugby team. Founded in 1960, Stade plays in the Ligue 1, the highest level of basketball in Mali.

The club is one of the most decorated teams in Mali, having won the Ligue 1 a record nineteen times and the Malian Cup a record twenty-five times. The Palais des Sports Salamatou Maiga is the home arena of the team.

Stade Malien were the third placed team in the 2023 season of the Basketball Africa League (BAL), and have qualified for the 2025 season as well. They were also runners-up in the FIBA Africa Club Champions Cup twice, in 1972 and 1989.

== History ==
The parent club of the basketball team was founded in 1960.

It took thirty-two years before Stade Malien won its first title, which was in 1992.

They also reached the FIBA Africa Club Champions Cup finals twice, in 1972 and 1989. Both finals were lost, to Red Star Ndongo and ASEC Mimosas respectively.

=== Recent years ===
After last appearing in international competitions in 2007, Stade Malien played in the 2023 season of the Basketball Africa League (BAL), after finishing third in the West Division of the Road to BAL. Stade Malien finished as winners of the 2023 Sahara Conference, after finishing with a 3–2 record. They were led by local young players, 22-year old Souleymane Berthé who averaged 20.4 points, and 21-year old Aliou Diarra who lead the conference in rebounding with 13.4 per game.

In the 2023 BAL Playoffs, Stade Malien continued its rise by defeating the Cape Town Tigers in the quarter-finals and thus becoming the first Malian team to reach the BAL semi-finals. In the semi-finals, the Malians narrowly lost to Al Ahly, before taking the third place game over Petro de Luanda. Aliou Diarra was named the BAL Defensive Player of the Year, and was given a spot in the All-BAL First Team.

After missing the 2024 season due to financial issues, Stade Malien was able to qualify for their second BAL season in the 2025 season, with their new head coach Boubacar Kanouté, and their core of local players, including Mahamane Coulibaly, Abdramane Kanouté and Ibrahim Djambo.

== Arena ==
Stade Malien plays its home games at the Palais des Sports Salamatou Maiga, a 8,000-capacity arena in Bamako.

== Honours ==
=== National ===
Ligue 1 (record)

- Champions (19): 1992, 1994, 1995, 1997, 1998, 1999, 2000, 2001, 2002, 2003, 2004, 2005, 2006, 2011, 2012, 2014, 2022, 2023, 2024

Malian Cup (record)

- Winners (25): 1961, 1967, 1968, 1969, 1979, 1980, 1981, 1989, 1989, 1990, 1991, 1992, 1993, 1995, 1996, 1997, 1998, 1999, 2000, 2001, 2002, 2004, 2005, 2013, 2014, 2022, 2023

Malian Super Cup

- Winners (2): 2012, 2023

=== International ===
Basketball Africa League (BAL)

- Third place (1): 2023

FIBA Africa Champions Cup

- Runners-up (2): 1972, 1989
- Third place (1): 1981
- Fourth place (1): 1996

Road to BAL

- Third place (1): 2023

== Players ==
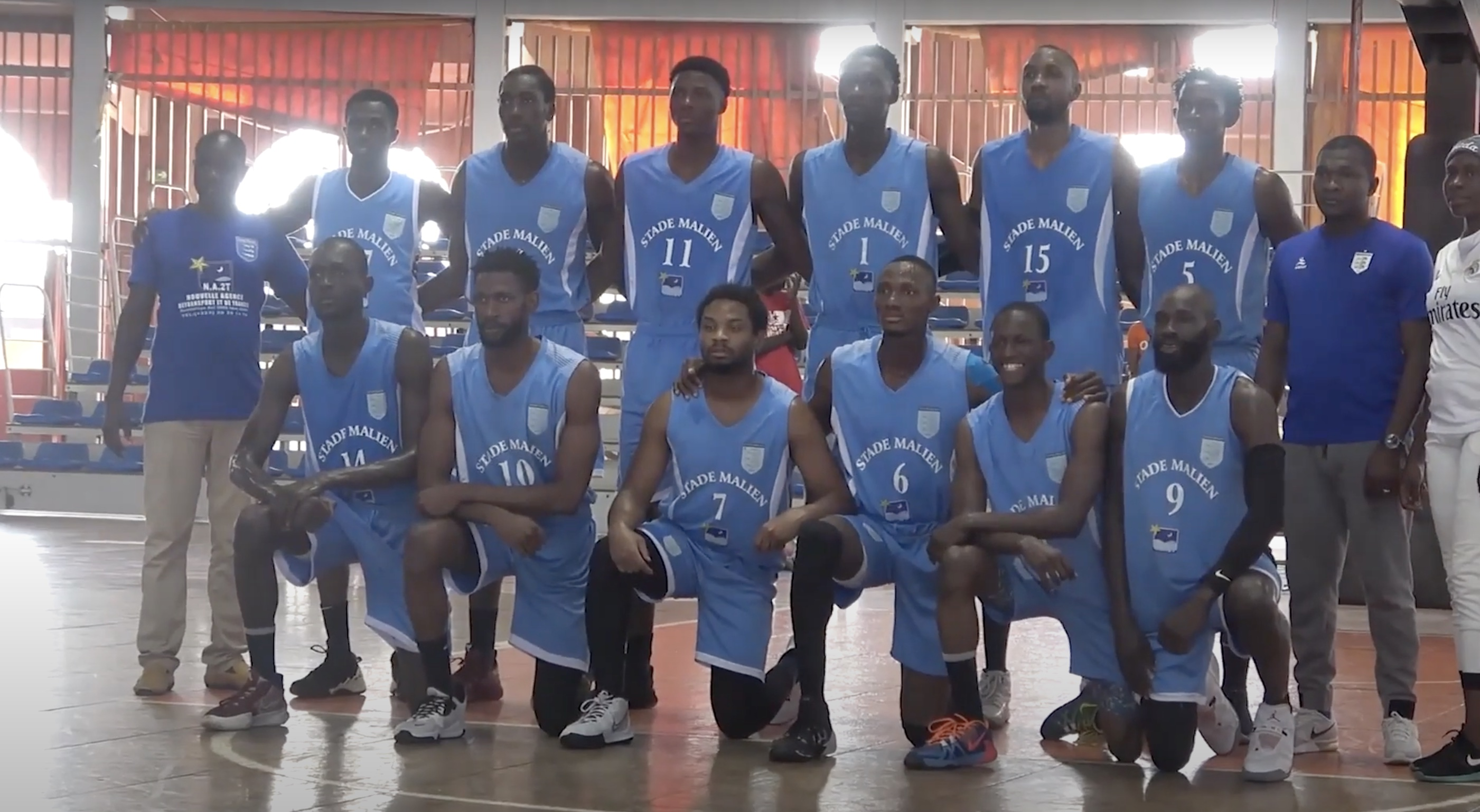
Stade Malien in 2023 during a friendly tournament ahead of the 2023 BAL season

=== 2023 roster ===
The following was the Stade Malien roster in the 2023 BAL season:

As of 22 May 2023.

Note: Flags indicate national team, as has been defined under FIBA eligibility rules. Players may hold more than one non-FIBA nationality.

No.	Pos.	Nat.	Player
1	PG	(Mali) MLI	Makan Keïta
2	SG	(Mali) MLI	Namakan Traoré
5	PF	(Mali) MLI	Mohamed Pare
6	G	(Nigeria) NGA	Kelvin Amayo
7	G	(Mali) MLI	Ouamr Bagayoko
10	G	(Mali) MLI	Mamadou Keita
12	SF	(Mali) MLI	Tamandjan Konate
14	PF	(Mali) MLI	Soumaila Sissouma
15	C	(Mali) MLI	Aliou Diarra
23	SF	(Mali) MLI	Souleymane Berthé
24	C	(Nigeria) NGA	Rueben Chinyelu
34	PF	(Morocco) MAR	John Wilkins
45	C	(United States) USA	Gregory Clay Foster

Head coach: (Mali) Kaba Kanté

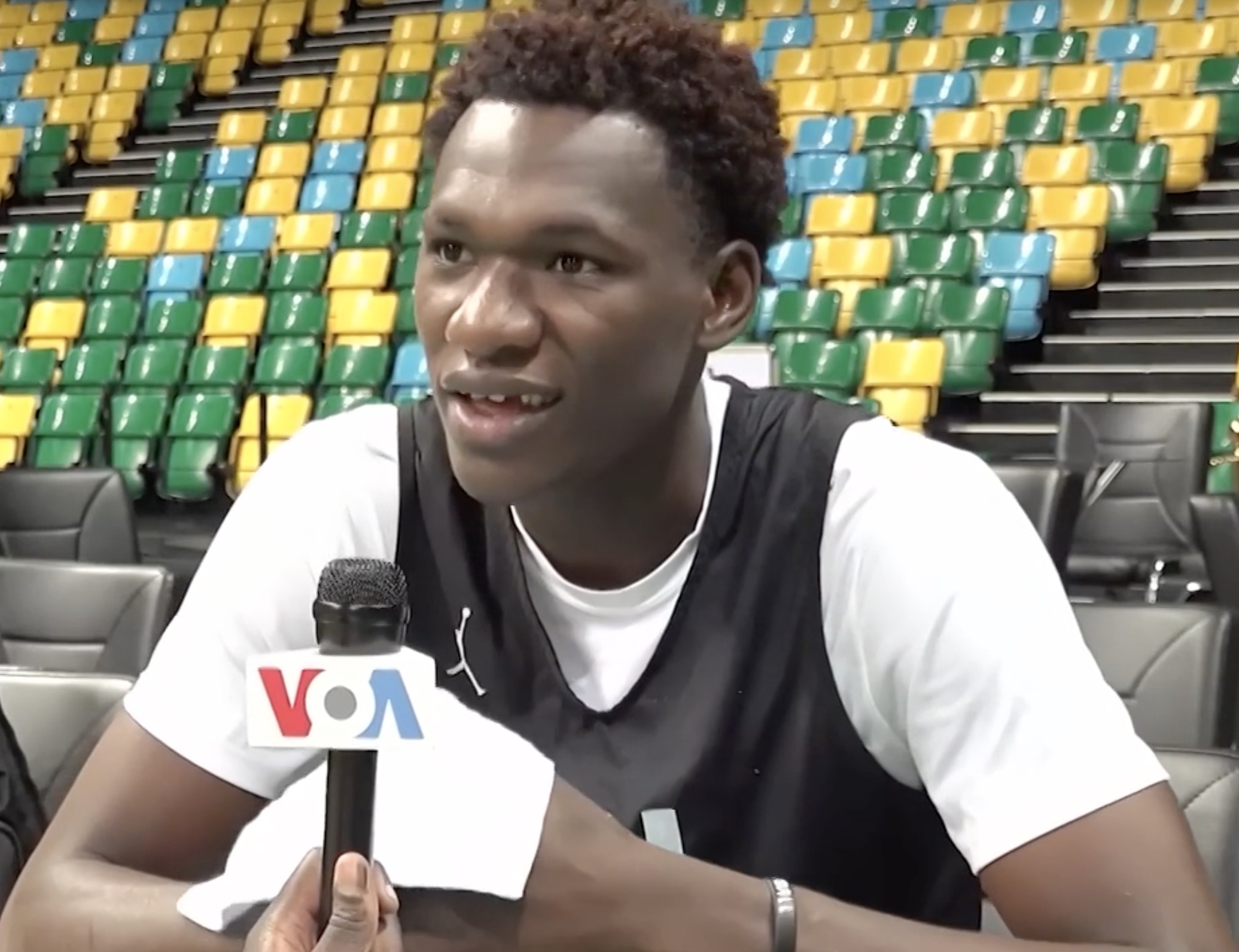
Aliou Diarra was the 2023 BAL Defensive Player of the Year

=== Notable players ===
Note: Flags indicate national team eligibility at FIBA-sanctioned events. Players may hold other non-FIBA nationalities not displayed.

Criteria

To appear in this section a player must have either:

- Set a club record or won an individual award while at the club
- Played at least one official international match for their national team at any time
- Played at least one official NBA match at any time.

- (Mali) Salimata Dembélé
- (Mali) Mamadou Keita
- (Mali) Aliou Diarra
- (Morocco) John Wilkins
- (Nigeria) Rueben Chinyelu
- (Mali) Souleymane Berthé

== In the Basketball Africa League ==
Season	Road to BAL				Main competition		
Season	W	L	Result	Qualified	W	L	Result
2023	6	2	Bronze	Yes	5	3	Bronze
2024	Withdrew due to financial issues				Did not qualify		
2025	5	2	Silver	Yes	0	6	4th (Kalahari Conference)
Total	11	4	2/2		5	9	

== Women's team ==
Stade Malien also has a women's team that plays in the highest division of Mali. The team has won the Malian championship three times (in 2001, 2011 and 2013) and the Malian Women's Cup eleven times (1981, 1991, 1992, 1993, 1994, 1995, 1996, 1998, 2001, 2016, 2022).
