= AS Police (basketball, Mali) =

Malinese basketball club

- Nickname: Policemen
- Leagues: Ligue 1
- Arena: Pavillon des Sports Modibo Keita
- Capacity: 1,100
- Location: Bamako, Mali
- Team colors: Blue, yellow, white
- Main sponsor: Orange
- President: Abdoulaye Cissé
- Head coach: Moussa Sogoré
- Championships: 4 Malian Leagues; 5 Malian Cups
Home	Away	BAL

Association Sportive Police, commonly known as AS Police, is a basketball club based in Bamako, Mali. The team plays in the Ligue 1. The roster mainly consists of civilians from N'Tomikorobougou, a neighborhood in Bamako, and police officers.

The team has known recent success, winning the national championship in 2017, 2019, 2020, 2021. The Police have also won five Malian Cups and were one of the twelve teams that played in the inaugural season of the Basketball Africa League (BAL) in 2021.

== History ==
In 2019, Police won its second Malian national championship. Under head coach Moussa Sogoré, the team went unbeaten (9–0) on its way to its maiden title. By winning this title, Police earned the right to play in the 2020 BAL qualifiers. In the first round, the team finished first in Group A and advanced to the second round after upsetting GS Pétroliers.

On 1 December 2019, the Police qualified for the inaugural Basketball Africa League (BAL) season after winning the third place game over ABC. The Police played the regular season of the tournament in Kigali and finished in the fourth and last place in Group B. Nigerian forward Jawachi Nzeakor led the team in scoring with 21 points per game. Center Ibrahima Thomas led the league in rebounding with 12 rebounds per game.

In the 2020–21 season, Police won its third consecutive Malian title after defeating Attar Club the finals.

== Players ==
=== Current roster ===
The following is the AS Police roster for the second round of the 2022 BAL qualification:

Note: Flags indicate national team eligibility at FIBA-sanctioned events. Players may hold other non-FIBA nationalities not displayed.

AS Police roster
Players
Coaches

Pos.	No.	Nat.	Name	Ht.	Age
PG	4	(Mali)	Kone, Hamma	1.88 m (6 ft 2 in)	27 – 31 October 1997
G/F	5	(Mali)	Pare, Mohamed	1.99 m (6 ft 6 in)	28 – 10 November 1996
SG	6	(Mali)	Kanoute, N'Faly	1.88 m (6 ft 2 in)	28 – 2 December 1996
SG	7	(Mali)	Traoré, Ousmane	1.90 m (6 ft 3 in)	26 – 18 August 1998
SG	8	(Ivory Coast)	Konaté, Stéphane (I)	1.92 m (6 ft 4 in)	44 – 23 August 1980
SG	9	(Mali)	Tandina, Papa	1.94 m (6 ft 4 in)	32 – 18 April 1993
SG	10	(Jamaica)	Prince, Taevaunn (I)	1.93 m (6 ft 4 in)	34 – 6 July 1991
PG	11	(Democratic Republic of the Congo)	Banza Kasongo, Jonathan (I)	1.87 m (6 ft 2 in)	28 – 26 July 1996
PF	12	(Mali)	Camara, Abdramane	2.05 m (6 ft 9 in)	25 – 11 April 2000
F	13	(Mali)	Diarouma, Benke	1.98 m (6 ft 6 in)	29 – 12 August 1995
C	14	(Mali)	Diallo, Ibrahima	2.08 m (6 ft 10 in)	27 – 8 May 1998
C	15	(Dominican Republic)	Gonzalez, Adonis (I)		30 – 20 October 1994

Head coach

- (Mali) Boubacar Kanoté

Assistant coach(es)

- (Mali) Kaba Kanté

Legend

- (C) Team captain
- (I) Import player
- Injured

- Roster
Updated: December 11, 2021

=== Past rosters ===
- 2021 BAL season

== Honours ==
Honours		No.	Years
Leagues
Ligue 1	Winner	4	2016–17, 2018–19, 2019–20, 2020–21
Ligue 1	Runners-up	1	2017–18
Malian Cup	Winner	5	2005, 2011, 2017, 2020, 2021
Malian Cup	Runners-up	2	2018, 2019
Malian Super Cup	Winner	3	2016–17, 2019–20, 2021–22
Malian Super Cup	Runners-up	3	2011–12, 2015–16, 2017–18

== In the Basketball Africa League ==
AS Police has played three games in the main Basketball Africa League tournaments, losing all three games in 2021.

Season	Tournament	Round	Club	Score
2021	BAL	Regular season	(Angola) Petro de Luanda	66–84
2021	BAL	Regular season	(Morocco) AS Salé	79–88
2021	BAL	Regular season	(Cameroon) FAP	65–87
