= Rueben Chinyelu =

Nigerian basketball player (born 2003)

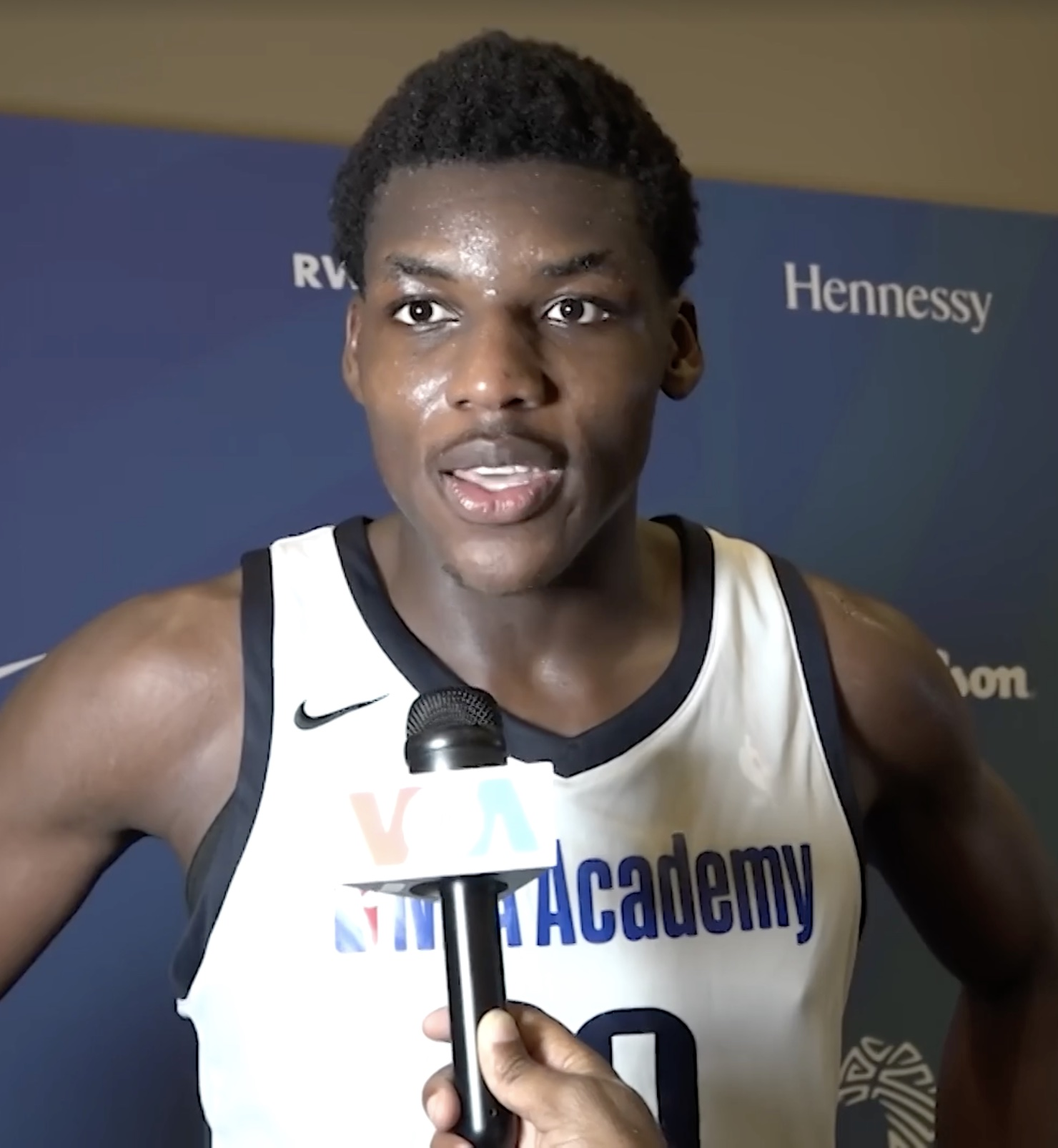
- Chinyelu in 2023

No. 9 – Florida Gators
- Position: Center
- Conference: Southeastern Conference

Personal information
- Born: 30 September 2003 (age 23) Enugwu-Agidi, Anambra State, Nigeria
- Listed height: 6 ft 10 in (2.08 m)
- Listed weight: 265 lb (120 kg)

Career information
- High school: NBA Academy Africa (Saly, Senegal)
- College: Washington State (2023–2024); Florida (2024–present)
- Playing career: 2022–present

Career history
- 2022: Ferroviário da Beira
- 2023: Stade Malien

Career highlights
- NCAA champion (2025); Naismith Defensive Player of the Year (2026); NABC Defensive Player of the Year (2026); SEC Defensive Player of the Year (2026); Second-team All-SEC (2026); SEC All-Defensive Team (2026)
Medals
Men's basketball
Representing Nigeria
FIBA U16 African Championship
Bronze medal – third place	Cape Verde 2019

Rueben Abuchi Chinyelu (born 30 September 2003) is a Nigerian college basketball player for the Florida Gators of the Southeastern Conference (SEC), and the Nigeria national team. He previously played for the Washington State Cougars.

== Early life and career ==
Born in Enugu Agidi, a village in Anambra State, Chinyelu picked up basketball in 2018 in Lagos when he joined Raptors Basketball Academy. He later joined the NBA Academy Africa in Saly, Senegal. Under the academy's agreement with the Basketball Africa League (BAL), he played in the 2022 season with Ferroviário da Beira, and in the 2023 season with Stade Malien. Chinyelu played an important role as back-up center for Stade Malien, averaging 7.9 rebounds off the bench to help the team take the third place.

At the 2022 NBA Academy Games in Atlanta, he won the championship and led the tournament in rebounding, leading to interest from American college scouts.

== College career ==
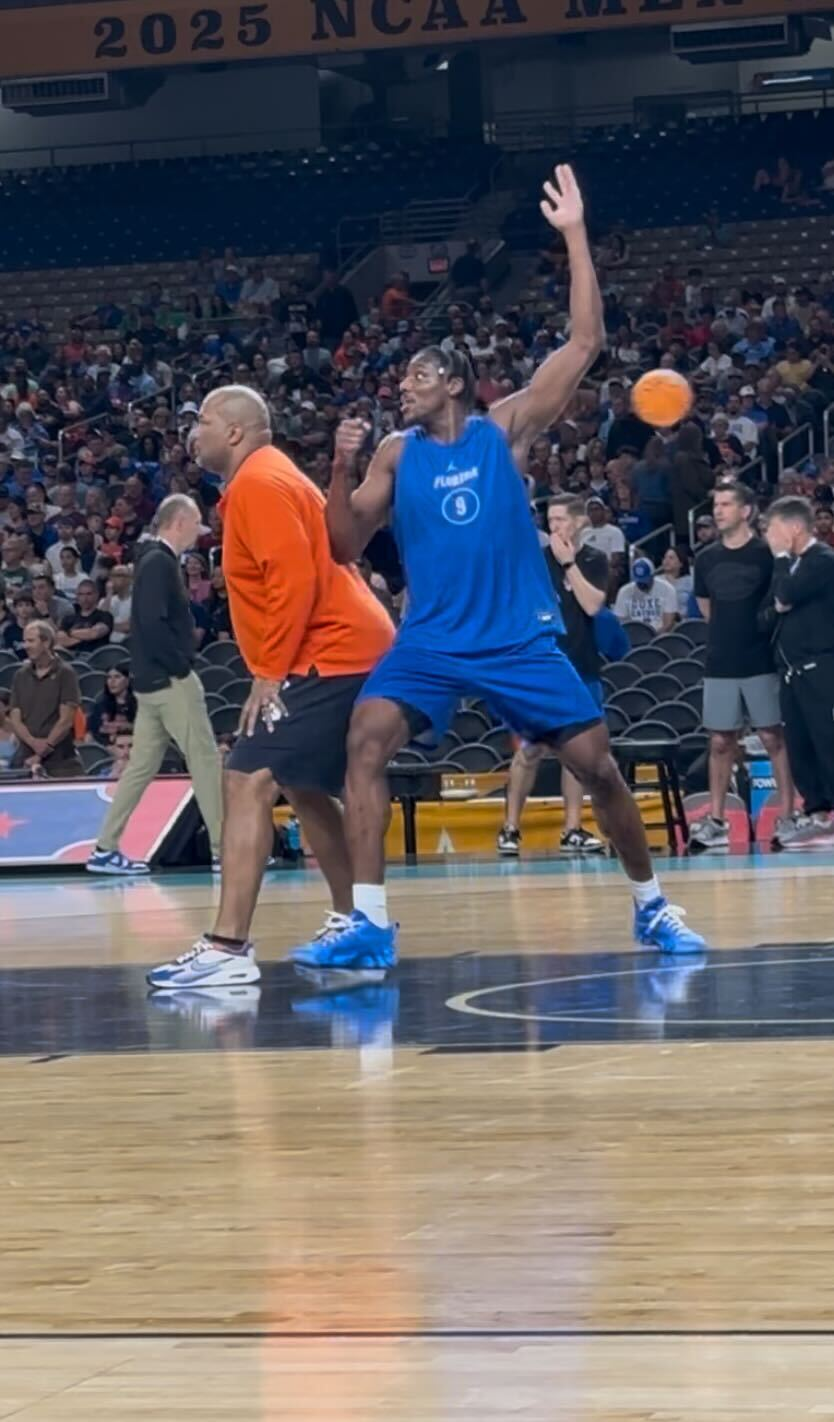
Rueben Chinyelu practicing at the 2025 Final Four in San Antonio

Chinyelu was considered one of the best international prospects in the Class of 2023, and received offers from Kansas, Tennessee and Florida, and at least six other schools.

In November 2022, Chinyelu committed to play for Washington State and joined the Cougars in 2023.

In April 2024, Chinyelu entered the transfer portal after one season at Washington State, and committed to Florida on 18 April 2024.

On April 7, 2025, Chinyelu won a national championship with Florida at the 2025 NCAA Tournament. He posted 3 points, 5 rebounds and 1 block in the national title game against Houston.

The following season, Chinyelu led the Gators to a number one seed in the 2026 NCAA tournament. On the season, he averaged 10.9 points and 11.2 rebounds per game and was named second-team All-SEC and the SEC Defensive Player of the Year. He was also recognized as the nation's top defensive player, winning the NABC Defensive Player of the Year on March 31, 2026. After spending his second year with the Gators, Chinyelu announced that he will be entering the 2026 NBA draft.

== National team career ==
Chinyelu played at the FIBA U16 African Championship in 2019, averaging 12.3 points and a tournament-leading 17.6 rebounds per game, helping his team to a bronze medal in Cape Verde.

On 27 August 2022, Chinyelu made his senior national team debut at age 18 in the qualifiers for the 2023 World Cup, scoring 3 points and grabbing 5 rebounds against Guinea.

== BAL career statistics ==
Legend
GP	Games played	GS	Games started	MPG	Minutes per game
FG%	Field goal percentage	3P%	3-point field goal percentage	FT%	Free throw percentage
RPG	Rebounds per game	APG	Assists per game	SPG	Steals per game
BPG	Blocks per game	PPG	Points per game	**Bold**	Career high

Year	Team	GP	GS	MPG	FG%	3P%	FT%	RPG	APG	SPG	BPG	PPG
2023	Ferroviário da Beira	3	0	9.7	.500	–	.000	3.3	.0	.3	.3	3.3
2023	Stade Malien	8	0	20.1	.429	.000	.636	8.8	.6	1.4	1.1	5.4
