= John Wilkins (basketball) =

French-American-Moroccan basketball player (born 1989)

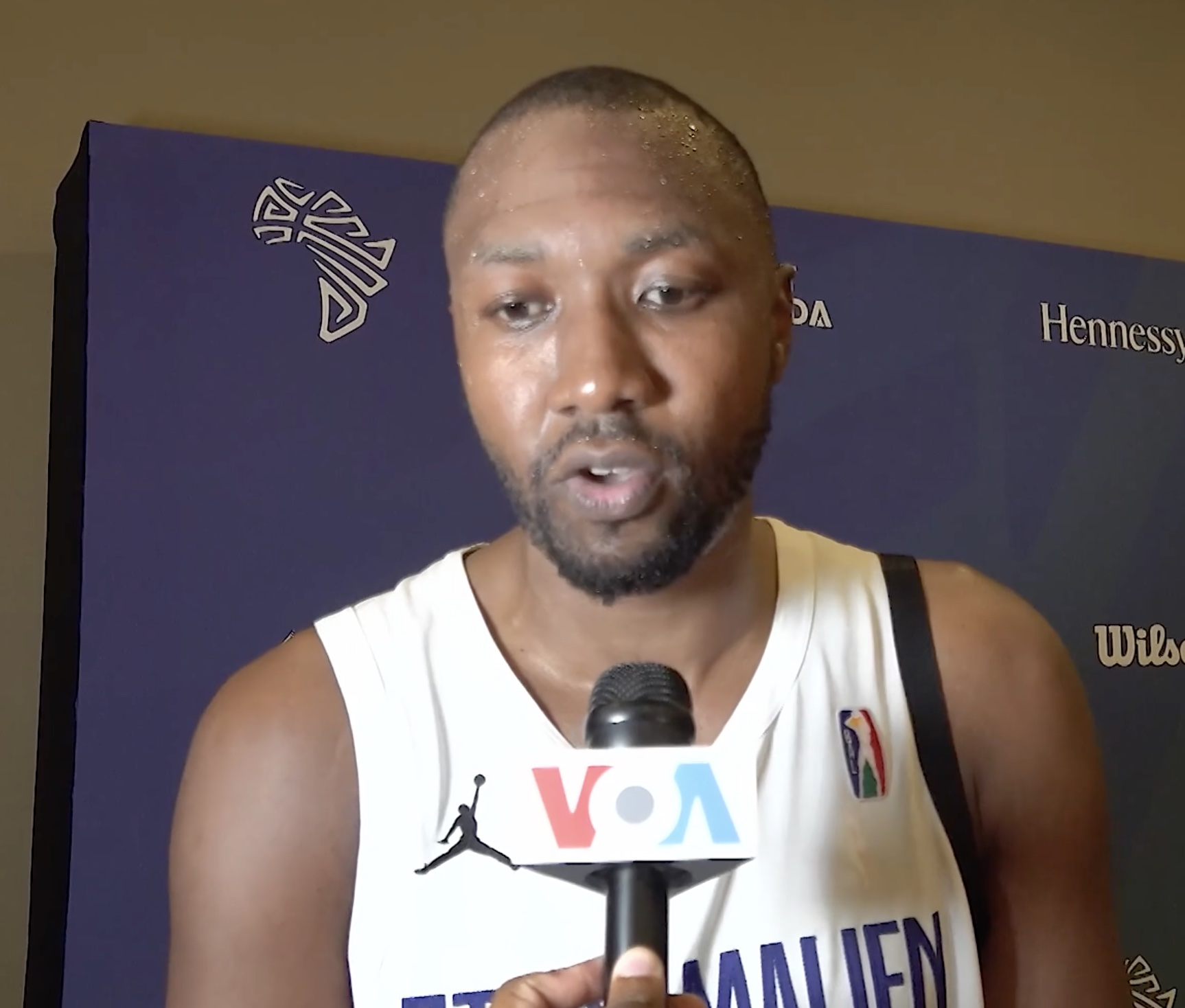
- Wilkins as a member of Stade Malien in 2023

Rivers Hoopers
- Position: Power forward / center
- League: BAL

Personal information
- Born: July 13, 1989 (age 37) Antibes, France
- Listed height: 6 ft 10 in (2.08 m)

Career information
- College: Illinois State (2010–2013)
- Playing career: 2013–present

Career history
- 2013–2015: Liège Basket
- 2015–2016: AS Salé
- 2016: ART Giants Düsseldorf
- 2016–2017: CRA Hoceima
- 2017–2019: Ittihad Tanger
- 2019–2020: ART Giants Düsseldorf
- 2020–2021: KACM
- 2021–2022: BC Liévinois
- 2023: Stade Malien
- 2024–present: Rivers Hoopers

John Walter Wilkins (born 13 July 1989) is a French-American-Moroccan professional basketball player who currently plays for Stade Malien. He is the son of former NBA player Jeff Wilkins.

== Professional career ==
Wilkins started his professional career in 2013 with Liège Basket in the Belgian Pro Basketball League.

After two seasons, Wilkins played three seasons in Morocco, one with CRA Hoceima and two with Ittihad Tanger. After one year with ART Giants Düsseldorf of the German third level ProB, he returned to Morocco to play for KACM.

In the 2021–22 season, Wilkins played in the French fourth division for BC Liévinois.

Wilkins played as an import player with Stade Malien in the 2023 BAL season.

In May 2024, Wilkins joined Rivers Hoopers for the 2024 BAL season.

== National team career ==
Wilkins played for Morocco's national team at the 2017 AfroBasket in Tunisia and Senegal.

== BAL career statistics ==
Legend
GP	Games played	GS	Games started	MPG	Minutes per game
FG%	Field goal percentage	3P%	3-point field goal percentage	FT%	Free throw percentage
RPG	Rebounds per game	APG	Assists per game	SPG	Steals per game
BPG	Blocks per game	PPG	Points per game	**Bold**	Career high

Year	Team	GP	GS	MPG	FG%	3P%	FT%	RPG	APG	SPG	BPG	PPG
2023	Stade Malien	8	8	16.5	.400	.346	.900	2.6	.5	.1	.3	6.4
