= Débo Club de Mopti =

Football team in Mali

- Full name: Association Sportive Débo Club de Mopti
- Ground: Stade Taïkiri; Mopti, Mali
- League: Malien Second Division
Away colours

Débo Club de Mopti is a football team based in the city of Mopti, in the African nation of Mali.

The team last played in the top Malian league, the Malien Premiere Division in the 2007/2008 season, after which they relegated.

== History ==
=== Achievements ===
- Malien Premiere Division' '

- Malien Cup:

- Mali SuperCup:
