= Atar Club Kidal =

Atar Club
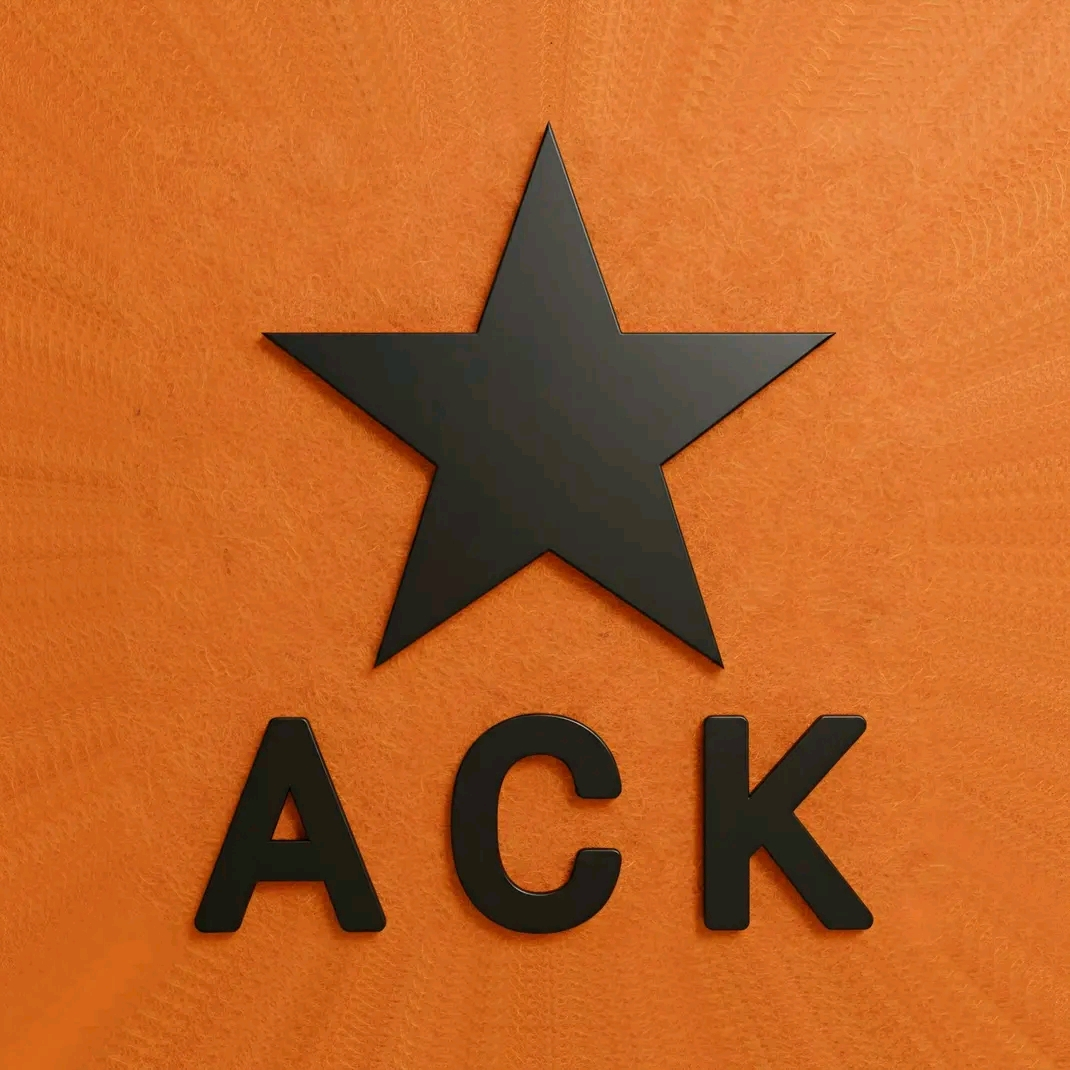
- League: Ligue 1
- Location: Kidal, Mali
- Championships: 1 Malian Cup (2019)

Atar Club de Kidal, better known as simply Atar Club, is a Malian basketball club from Kidal. The team plays in the Ligue 1, the highest national basketball league. In 2020 and 2021, Attar was the runner-up behind champions AS Police. They have won one trophy, as they were the Malian Cup winners in 2019.

== Honours ==
- Ligue 1
  - Runners-up (2): 2019–20, 2020–21
- Malian Cup
  - Champions (1): 2019
  - Runners-up (1): 2020
