= AS Elewidj FC =

Malian football club

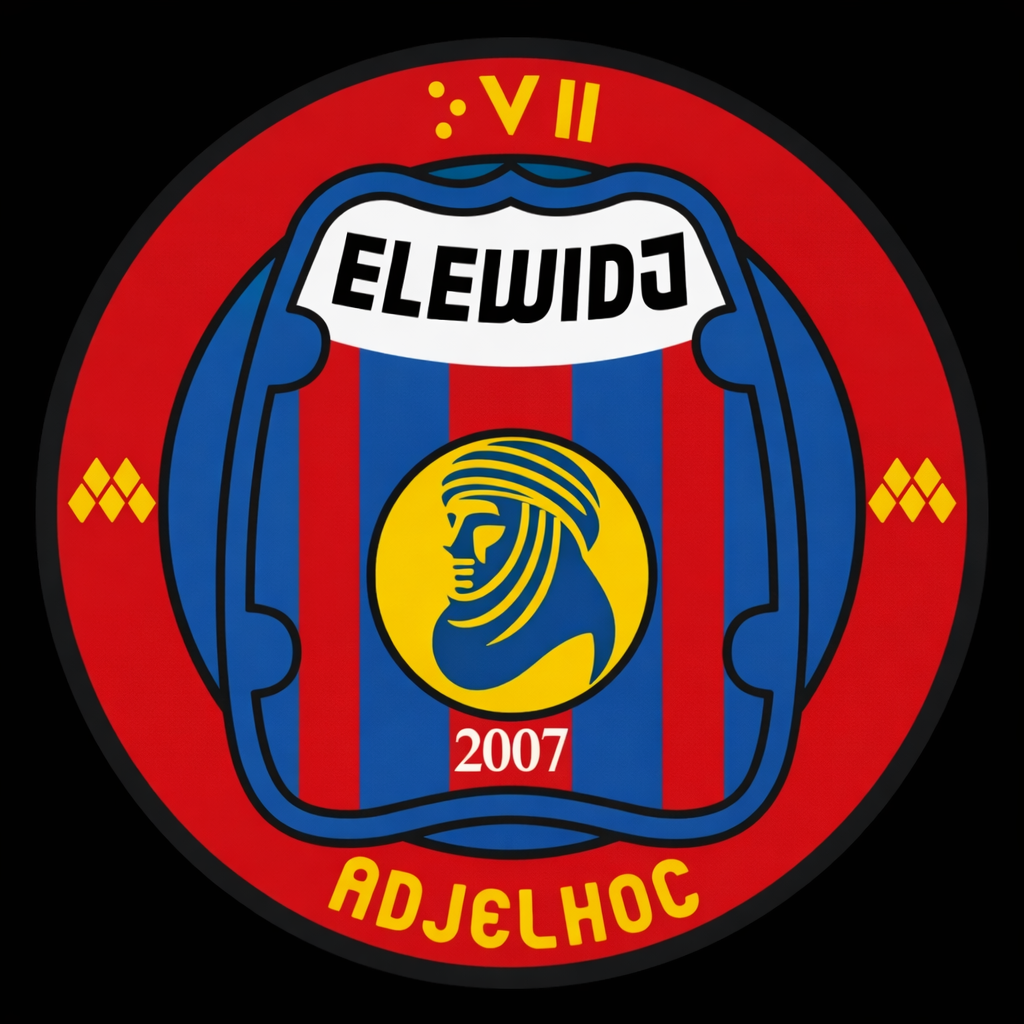
- Full name: Association Sportive Elewidj Football Club
- Nickname: Tuaregs
- Founded: 2007; 19 years ago
- Ground: Mano Dayak Stadium; Kidal, Mali
- Chairman: Rhissa ag Bahani
- Coach: Seydou Baba Coulibaly
- League: Malian Second Division
- 2025–2026: 1st
Home colours	Away colours

Association Sportive Elewidj FC is a Malian football club based in Aguelhok. They play in the Malien Second Division, Kidal Regional Football League.

== League participations ==
- Malien Second Division: 2007-2013
- Malien Premiere Division: 2013–2014
- Malien Second Division: 2014-2026

== Stadium ==
The team played before at Mano Dayak Stadium,Kidal. But since 2012 the team has moved to Bamako and currently plays at the Stade 26 Mars, Bamako.

== Current squad ==
As of 16 February, 2026. Note: Flags indicate national team as defined under FIFA eligibility rules; some limited exceptions apply. Players may hold more than one non-FIFA nationality.

No.	Pos.	Nation	Player
1	GK	MLI	Adama Doumbia
2	DF	MLI	Amadou Konate
3	MF	MLI	Ibrahim Diallo
4	DF	MLI	Karim Konaté
5	MF	MLI	Ousmane Ballo (captain)
6	MF	MLI	Salif Traoré
7	FW	MLI	Lamine Coulibaly
8	MF	MLI	Samba Sidibé
9	FW	MLI	Makan Samake
10	FW	MLI	Soumana Diarra
11	FW	MLI	Moussa Diakite
12	DF	MLI	Aboubacar.S Kourouma
13	DF	MLI	Amadou Coulibaly
14	DF	MLI	Modibo Daou
15	FW	MLI	Boubacar Guindo
16	GK	MLI	Yacouba Yarre
17	DF	MLI	Ousmane Bambera
18	MF	MLI	Alou Diallo
19	FW	MLI	Youssouf Bamba
20	MF	MLI	Adama Traoré
21	FW	MLI	Daouda Coulibaly
22	MF	MLI	Elbekaye Keita
23	DF	MLI	Dramane Diakité
24	FW	MLI	Mahamane Touré
25	FW	MLI	Abdoulaye Traore
26	FW	MLI	Djibril Banou
27	MF	MLI	Modibo Traore
28	GK	MLI	Aboubacar Traore
29	GK	MLI	Mahamadou Coulibaly
30	GK	MLI	Mahamadou Traore
—			
