= AS Tata National =

Malian football club

AS Tata National (Association Sportive Tata National Sikasso) is a Malian football club based in Sikasso. As of 2008, they last played in the top division in Malian football during the 2006/07 season. Their home stadium is Stade Omnisports.
