= Malian Cup (basketball) =

Malian Basketball Cup
- Sport: Basketball
- Founded: 1961
- First season: 1961
- Most recent champion: Stade Malien (25th title) (2023)
- Most titles: Stade Malien (25 titles)

The Malian Men's Basketball Cup (in French: Coupe du Mali du basket-ball) is the national cup competition for basketball teams in Mali. The first edition of the Cup was held in 1961. Stade Malien holds the record for most cup titles, with a total of 25 titles won.

== List of winners ==
The following is a list of all winners of the Malian Cup since 1961:

| Edition | Year | Winners |
|---|---|---|
| 1 | 1961 | Stade Malien |
| 2 | 1962 | Lycée Askia |
| 3 | 1963 | Lycée Askia |
| 4 | 1964 | Ecole des Travaux |
| 5 | 1965 | Djoliba |
| 6 | 1966 | Djoliba |
| 7 | 1967 | Stade Malien |
| 8 | 1968 | Stade Malien |
| 9 | 1969 | Stade Malien |
| – | 1970–1978 | Suspended |
| 10 | 1979 | Stade Malien |
| 11 | 1980 | Stade Malien |
| 12 | 1981 | Stade Malien |
| 13 | 1982 | Real Bamako |
| 14 | 1983 | Real Bamako |
| 15 | 1984 | Real Bamako |
| 16 | 1985 | USFAS |
| 17 | 1986 | Real Bamako |
| 18 | 1987 | Real Bamako |
| 19 | 1988 | Real Bamako |
| 20 | 1989 | Stade Malien |
| 21 | 1990 | Real Bamako |
| 22 | 1991 | Stade Malien |
| 23 | 1992 | Stade Malien |
| 24 | 1993 | Stade Malien |
| 25 | 1994 | AS Biao |
| 26 | 1995 | Stade Malien |
| 27 | 1996 | Stade Malien |
| 28 | 1997 | Stade Malien |
| 29 | 1998 | Stade Malien |
| 30 | 1999 | Stade Malien |
| 31 | 2000 | Stade Malien |
| 32 | 2001 | Stade Malien |
| 33 | 2002 | Stade Malien |
| 34 | 2003 | Real Bamako |
| 35 | 2004 | Real Bamako |
| 36 | 2005 | Real Bamako |
| 37 | 2006 | Stade Malien |
| 38 | 2007 | Real Bamako |
| 39 | 2008 | Real Bamako |
| 40 | 2009 | Real Bamako |
| 41 | 2010 | Real Bamako |
| 42 | 2011 | AS Police |
| – | 2012 | Suspended |
| 43 | 2013 | Stade Malien |
| 44 | 2014 | Stade Malien |
| 45 | 2015 | AS Police |
| 46 | 2016 | Stade Malien |
| 47 | 2017 | USFAS |
| 48 | 2018 | Real Bamako |
| 49 | 2019 | Atar Club |
| 50 | 2020 | AS Police |
| 51 | 2021 | AS Police |
| 52 | 2022 | Stade Malien |
| 53 | 2023 | Stade Malien |

== List of finals ==
Finals of the Malian Cup
| Season | Champions | Score | Runners-up | Ref. |
|---|---|---|---|---|
| 2014 | Stade Malien | 62–52 | Centre Bintou Dembélé | |
| 2015 | AS Police | 68–44 | Stade Malien | |
| 2016 | Stade Malien | 66–64 | AS Police | |
| 2017 | USFAS | 70–59 | AS Police | |
| 2018 | Real Bamako | 57–55 | AS Police | |
| 2019 | Atar Club | 79–78 | AS Police | |
| 2020 | AS Police | 78–75 | Atar Club | |
| 2021 | AS Police | 67–54 | AS Mandé | |
| 2022 | Stade Malien | 81–46 | AS Mandé | |
| 2023 | Stade Malien | 74–60 | Real Bamako | |

== Performance by club ==
Results by team
| Club | Wins | First final won | Last final won | Runners-up | Last final lost | Total final appearances |
|---|---|---|---|---|---|---|
| Stade Malien | 25 | 1961 | 2023 | 1 | 2017 | 25+ |
| AS Real Bamako | 15 | 1982 | 2023 | 0 | – | – |
| AS Police | 4 | 2011 | 2021 | 4 | 2019 | 7+ |
| Djoliba | 2 | 1965 | 1966 | 0 | – | 2 |
| Lycée Askia | 2 | 1962 | 1963 | 0 | – | 2 |
| USFAS | 2 | 1985 | 2017 | 0 | – | 2 |
| AS Biaou | 1 | 1994 | | 0 | – | 1 |
| Atar Club | 1 | 2019 | | 1 | 2020 | 1 |
| AS Mandé | 0 | | | 2 | 2022 | 2 |
| Centre Bintou Dembélé | 0 | | | 1 | 2014 | 1 |
