= Stade Taïkiri =

Football stadium in Mopti, Mali

Stade Taïkiri is located in Mopti, Mali. It is used mostly for football and serves as the home stadium of Débo Club de Mopti of the Malien Première Division. The stadium has a capacity of 6,000 spectators.
