= Office du Niger Sports =

Malian football club

- Full name: Office du Niger Sports
- Nickname: Le blanc de Ségou
- Founded: 2011
- Ground: Stade Amary Daou; Ségou, Mali
- Capacity: 15,000
- Chairman: Barrou Soumnou
- Manager: Moustapha Maiga
- League: Malien Premiere Division
- 2011-2012: Première

Office du Niger Sports is a Malian football club. They play in the Malien Premiere Division.
