= Ligue 1 (Mali) =

- Organising body: Mali Basketball Federation
- Country: Mali
- Number of teams: 8
- Level on pyramid: 1
- Domestic cup: Malian Cup
- International cup: Basketball Africa League (BAL)
- Current champions: Stade Malien (20th title) (2025–26)
- Most championships: Stade Malien (20 titles)

The Ligue 1 (for sponsorship reasons known as Ligue 1 Orange) is the premier basketball competition for clubs in Mali. The league consist out of ten teams. The most decorated team in the league is Stade Malien, who have won a record nineteen league championships.

The champions of the league are eligible to play in the qualifying rounds of the Basketball Africa League (BAL).

== Current teams ==
The following were the eight teams for the 2019 season:

- AS Police
- USFAS Bamako
- Atar Club
- AS Real Bamako
- Stade Malien
- AS Sigui
- Djoliba AC
- AS Mandé
- CBD
- KBC

== Champions ==
Season	Champions	Runners-up	Score	Ref.
1992	Stade Malien (1)			
1993				
1994	Stade Malien (2)			
1995	Stade Malien (3)			
1996				
1997	Stade Malien (4)			
1998	Stade Malien (5)			
1999	Stade Malien (6)			
2000	Stade Malien (7)			
2001	Stade Malien (8)			
2002	Stade Malien (9)			
2003	Stade Malien (10)			
2004	Stade Malien (11)			
2005	Stade Malien (12)			
2006	Stade Malien (13)			
2007				
2008				
2009	Real Bamako	AS Police		
2010	Real Bamako	Stade Malien	79–62	
2011	Stade Malien (14)			
2012	Stade Malien (15)			
2013	Real Bamako	USFAS	3–1	
2014	Stade Malien (16)	AS Police	3–1	
2014–15	Real Bamako	Centre Bintou Dembélé	3–2	
2015–16	AS Police (1)	Centre Bintou Dembélé		
2016–17				
2017–18	USFAS (1)	Stade Malien	3–0	
2018–19	AS Police (2)	USFAS		
2019–20	AS Police (3)	Attar Club	3–1	
2020–21	AS Police (4)	Attar Club	2–0	
2021–22	Stade Malien (17)	AS Mandé	3–0	
2022–23	Stade Malien (18)	USFAS	3–0	
2023–24	Stade Malien (19)	AS Police	3–1	
2024–25	CRB (1)	Stade Malien	3–2	
2025–26	Stade Malien (20)	Djoliba	3–1	

== Super Cup ==
Season	Champions	Runners-up	Finals score	Ref.
2011–12	Stade Malien	AS Police	57–47	
2015–16	Real Bamako	AS Police	64–54	
2016–17	AS Police	Stade Malien	71–65	
2017–18	USFAS Bamako	AS Police	52–48	
2018–19	USFAS Bamako	Real Bamako	74–64	
2019–20	AS Police	Atar Club	60–57	
2020–21	not held			
2021–22	AS Police	AS Mandé	75–72	
2022–23	Stade Malien	AS Mandé	80–36	

== In the Basketball Africa League ==
In the 2021 season, AS Police made its debut in the Basketball Africa League (BAL) as Malian representative. Two years later, Stade Malien became the second team from the country to qualify.

Ligue 1 teams in the Road to BAL and in the BAL
Season	Representative team	Road to BAL	Qualified	Main competition	Record
2021	AS Police	Third place	Yes	Group phase	0–3
2022	AS Police	Fourth place	No	DNQ	
2023	Stade Malien	Third place	Yes	Bronze	5–3
2025	Stade Malien	Second place	Yes	Group phase	0–6
2026	CRB	Third place	No	DNQ	
