= Atar Club =

Malian football club

Atar
- Full name: Atar Club
- Ground: Stade Municipal de Bamako; Bamako, Mali
- Capacity: 5,000
- League: Malien Second Division

Atar Club is a Malian football club based in Bamako. In 2012 they played in the top division in Malian football.

Currently they play in the Malien Second Division.

== Stadium ==
Their home stadium is Stade Municipal de Bamako.

== League participations ==
- Malian Première Division: 2012–2013
- Malien Second Division: ?-2012, 2013–
