= Senegal at the Africa Cup of Nations =

Senegal have played in seventeen editions of the Africa Cup of Nations.

Historically, Senegal was seen as a weaker side in the strong West African region. Although they finished in fourth place in two AFCON editions, Senegalese performance was overall still deemed as poor. Senegal remained under the shadow of much more successful West African giants Nigeria, Ivory Coast and Ghana for the majority of the 20th century.

In the 2000s, Senegal began to surge and became a more competitive opponent in the Africa Cup of Nations. Following a successful FIFA World Cup debut in 2002, in which the side reached the quarter-finals, Senegal officially established itself as a new powerhouse in Africa. The 2002 Africa Cup of Nations tournament marked the best ever result in Senegalese football history, with the team falling to Cameroon 2–3 on penalties after a goalless draw in the final. Senegal once again finished as runners-up in 2019, losing the final 0–1 to Algeria. The nation finally won their first AFCON title in 2021, defeating Egypt on penalties in the final.

On 18 January 2026, Senegal’s second-place finish in the 2025 edition of the Africa Cup of Nations sparked major controversy.

== Overall record ==
Africa Cup of Nations record
Year	Round	Position	Pld	W	D*	L	GF	GA
(Sudan) 1957	Did not enter							
(United Arab Republic) 1959	Did not enter							
(Ethiopia) 1962	Did not enter							
(Ghana) 1963	Did not enter							
(Tunisia) 1965	Fourth place	4th	3	1	1	1	5	2
(Ethiopia) 1968	Group stage	5th	3	1	1	1	5	5
(Sudan) 1970	Did not qualify							
(Cameroon) 1972	Did not qualify							
(Egypt) 1974	Did not qualify							
(Ethiopia) 1976	Did not qualify							
(Ghana) 1978	Did not qualify							
(Nigeria) 1980	Did not enter							
(Libya) 1982	Did not qualify							
(Ivory Coast) 1984	Did not qualify							
(Egypt) 1986	Group stage	5th	3	2	0	1	3	1
(Morocco) 1988	Did not qualify							
(Algeria) 1990	Fourth place	4th	5	1	2	2	3	3
(Senegal) 1992	Quarter-finals	5th	3	1	0	2	4	3
(Tunisia) 1994	Quarter-finals	8th	3	1	0	2	2	3
(South Africa) 1996	Did not qualify							
(Burkina Faso) 1998	Did not qualify							
(Ghana) (Nigeria) 2000	Quarter-finals	7th	4	1	1	2	6	6
(Mali) 2002	Runners-up	2nd	6	4	2	0	6	1
(Tunisia) 2004	Quarter-finals	6th	4	1	2	1	4	2
(Egypt) 2006	Fourth place	4th	6	2	0	4	7	8
(Ghana) 2008	Group stage	12th	3	0	2	1	4	6
(Angola) 2010	Did not qualify							
(Gabon) (Equatorial Guinea) 2012	Group stage	13th	3	0	0	3	3	6
(South Africa) 2013	Did not qualify							
(Equatorial Guinea) 2015	Group stage	9th	3	1	1	1	3	4
(Gabon) 2017	Quarter-finals	5th	4	2	2	0	6	2
(Egypt) 2019	Runners-up	2nd	7	5	0	2	8	2
(Cameroon) 2021	Champions	1st	7	5	2	0	9	2
(Ivory Coast) 2023	Round of 16	9th	4	3	1	0	9	2
(Morocco) 2025	Runners-up	2nd	7	5	1	1	12	5
(Kenya) (Tanzania) (Uganda) 2027	To be determined							
Total	1 Title	18/35	78	35	19	24	99	63

== Matches ==
Tournament	Date	Location	Round	Opponent	Score	Senegal scorers
(Tunisia) 1965	14 November 1965	(Tunisia) Tunis	Group stage	Tunisia	0–0	—
(Tunisia) 1965	19 November 1965	(Tunisia) Tunis	Group stage	Ethiopia	5–1	Louis Camara (2), Oumar Samb Guèye, Matar Niang (2)
(Tunisia) 1965	21 November 1965	(Tunisia) Tunis	Third place	Ivory Coast	0–1	—
(Ethiopia) 1968	12 January 1968	(Ethiopia) Asmara	Group stage	Ghana	2–2	Doudou Diongue, Yatma Diop
(Ethiopia) 1968	14 January 1968	(Ethiopia) Asmara	Group stage	Congo-Brazzaville	2–1	Yatma Diop, Yatma Diouck
(Ethiopia) 1968	16 January 1968	(Ethiopia) Asmara	Group stage	Congo-Kinshasa	1–2	Yatma Diouck
(Egypt) 1986	7 March 1986	(Egypt) Cairo	Group stage	Egypt	1–0	Thierno Youm
(Egypt) 1986	10 March 1986	(Egypt) Cairo	Group stage	Mozambique	2–0	Pape Fall, Jules Bocandé
(Egypt) 1986	13 March 1986	(Egypt) Cairo	Group stage	Ivory Coast	0–1	—
(Algeria) 1990	3 March 1990	(Algeria) Annaba	Group stage	Kenya	0–0	—
(Algeria) 1990	6 March 1990	(Algeria) Annaba	Group stage	Cameroon	2–0	Mamadou Diallo, Moussa N'Dao
(Algeria) 1990	9 March 1990	(Algeria) Annaba	Group stage	Zambia	0–0	—
(Algeria) 1990	12 March 1990	(Algeria) Algiers	Semi-finals	Algeria	1–2	Abdelhakim Serrar (o.g.)
(Algeria) 1990	15 March 1990	(Algeria) Algiers	Third place	Zambia	0–1	—
(Senegal) 1992	12 January 1992	(Senegal) Dakar	Group stage	Nigeria	1–2	Jules Bocandé
(Senegal) 1992	16 January 1992	(Senegal) Dakar	Group stage	Kenya	3–0	Souleymane Sané, Jules Bocandé, Victor Diagne
(Senegal) 1992	19 January 1992	(Senegal) Dakar	Quarter-finals	Cameroon	0–1	—
(Tunisia) 1994	29 March 1994	(Tunisia) Sousse	Group stage	Guinea	2–1	Momath Gueye, Athanas Tendeng
(Tunisia) 1994	31 March 1994	(Tunisia) Sousse	Group stage	Ghana	0–1	—
(Tunisia) 1994	3 April 1994	(Tunisia) Sousse	Quarter-finals	Zambia	0–1	—
(Ghana) (Nigeria) 2000	25 January 2000	(Nigeria) Kano	Group stage	Burkina Faso	3–1	Henri Camara, Pape Sarr, Salif Keita
(Ghana) (Nigeria) 2000	28 January 2000	(Nigeria) Kano	Group stage	Egypt	0–1	—
(Ghana) (Nigeria) 2000	2 February 2000	(Nigeria) Lagos	Group stage	Zambia	2–2	Henri Camara, Abdoulaye M'Baye
(Ghana) (Nigeria) 2000	7 February 2000	(Nigeria) Lagos	Quarter-finals	Nigeria	1–2 (a.e.t.)	Khalilou Fadiga
(Mali) 2002	20 January 2002	(Mali) Bamako	Group stage	Egypt	1–0	Lamine Diatta
(Mali) 2002	26 January 2002	(Mali) Bamako	Group stage	Zambia	1–0	Souleymane Camara
(Mali) 2002	31 January 2002	(Mali) Kayes	Group stage	Tunisia	0–0	—
(Mali) 2002	4 February 2002	(Mali) Bamako	Quarter-finals	DR Congo	2–0	Salif Diao, El Hadji Diouf
(Mali) 2002	7 February 2002	(Mali) Bamako	Semi-finals	Nigeria	2–1 (a.e.t.)	Papa Bouba Diop, Salif Diao
(Mali) 2002	10 February 2002	(Mali) Bamako	Final	Cameroon	0–0 (a.e.t.) (2–3 p)	—
(Tunisia) 2004	26 January 2004	(Tunisia) Tunis	Group stage	Burkina Faso	0–0	—
(Tunisia) 2004	30 January 2004	(Tunisia) Bizerte	Group stage	Kenya	3–0	Mamadou Niang (2), Papa Bouba Diop
(Tunisia) 2004	2 February 2004	(Tunisia) Tunis	Group stage	Mali	1–1	Habib Beye
(Tunisia) 2004	7 February 2004	(Tunisia) Radès	Quarter-finals	Tunisia	0–1	—
(Egypt) 2006	23 January 2006	(Egypt) Port Said	Group stage	Zimbabwe	2–0	Henri Camara, Issa Ba
(Egypt) 2006	27 January 2006	(Egypt) Port Said	Group stage	Ghana	0–1	—
(Egypt) 2006	31 January 2006	(Egypt) Port Said	Group stage	Nigeria	1–2	Souleymane Camara
(Egypt) 2006	3 February 2006	(Egypt) Alexandria	Quarter-finals	Guinea	3–2	Papa Bouba Diop, Mamadou Niang, Henri Camara
(Egypt) 2006	7 February 2006	(Egypt) Cairo	Semi-finals	Egypt	1–2	Mamadou Niang
(Egypt) 2006	9 February 2006	(Egypt) Cairo	Third place	Nigeria	0–1	—
(Ghana) 2008	23 January 2008	(Ghana) Tamale	Group stage	Tunisia	2–2	Moustapha Bayal Sall, Diomansy Kamara
(Ghana) 2008	27 January 2008	(Ghana) Tamale	Group stage	Angola	1–3	Abdoulaye Faye
(Ghana) 2008	31 January 2008	(Ghana) Kumasi	Group stage	South Africa	1–1	Henri Camara
(Gabon) (Equatorial Guinea) 2012	21 January 2012	(Equatorial Guinea) Bata	Group stage	Zambia	1–2	Dame N'Doye
(Gabon) (Equatorial Guinea) 2012	25 January 2012	(Equatorial Guinea) Bata	Group stage	Equatorial Guinea	1–2	Moussa Sow
(Gabon) (Equatorial Guinea) 2012	29 January 2012	(Equatorial Guinea) Bata	Group stage	Libya	1–2	Deme N'Diaye
(Equatorial Guinea) 2015	19 January 2015	(Equatorial Guinea) Mongomo	Group stage	Ghana	2–1	Mame Biram Diouf, Moussa Sow
(Equatorial Guinea) 2015	23 January 2015	(Equatorial Guinea) Mongomo	Group stage	South Africa	1–1	Kara Mbodji
(Equatorial Guinea) 2015	27 January 2015	(Equatorial Guinea) Malabo	Group stage	Algeria	0–2	—
(Gabon) 2017	15 January 2017	(Gabon) Franceville	Group stage	Tunisia	2–0	Sadio Mané, Kara Mbodji
(Gabon) 2017	19 January 2017	(Gabon) Franceville	Group stage	Zimbabwe	2–0	Sadio Mané, Henri Saivet
(Gabon) 2017	23 January 2017	(Gabon) Franceville	Group stage	Algeria	2–2	Papakouli Diop, Moussa Sow
(Gabon) 2017	28 January 2017	(Gabon) Franceville	Quarter-finals	Cameroon	0–0 (a.e.t.) (4–5 p)	—
(Egypt) 2019	23 June 2019	(Egypt) Cairo	Group stage	Tanzania	2–0	Keita Baldé, Krépin Diatta
(Egypt) 2019	27 June 2019	(Egypt) Cairo	Group stage	Algeria	0–1	—
(Egypt) 2019	1 July 2019	(Egypt) Cairo	Group stage	Kenya	3–0	Ismaïla Sarr, Sadio Mané (2)
(Egypt) 2019	5 July 2019	(Egypt) Cairo	Round of 16	Uganda	1–0	Sadio Mané
(Egypt) 2019	10 July 2019	(Egypt) Cairo	Quarter-finals	Benin	1–0	Idrissa Gueye
(Egypt) 2019	14 July 2019	(Egypt) Cairo	Semi-finals	Tunisia	1–0 (a.e.t.)	Dylan Bronn (o.g.)
(Egypt) 2019	19 July 2019	(Egypt) Cairo	Final	Algeria	0–1	—
(Cameroon) 2021	10 January 2022	(Cameroon) Bafoussam	Group stage	Zimbabwe	1–0	Sadio Mané
(Cameroon) 2021	14 January 2022	(Cameroon) Bafoussam	Group stage	Guinea	0–0	—
(Cameroon) 2021	18 January 2022	(Cameroon) Bafoussam	Group stage	Malawi	0–0	—
(Cameroon) 2021	25 January 2022	(Cameroon) Bafoussam	Round of 16	Cape Verde	2–0	Sadio Mané, Bamba Dieng
(Cameroon) 2021	30 January 2022	(Cameroon) Douala	Quarter-finals	Equatorial Guinea	3–1	Famara Diédhiou, Cheikhou Kouyaté, Ismaïla Sarr
(Cameroon) 2021	2 February 2022	(Cameroon) Yaoundé	Semi-finals	Burkina Faso	3–1	Abdou Diallo, Idrissa Gueye, Sadio Mané
(Cameroon) 2021	6 February 2022	(Cameroon) Yaoundé	Final	Egypt	0–0 (a.e.t.) (4–2 p)	—
(Ivory Coast) 2023	15 January 2024	(Ivory Coast) Yamoussoukro	Group stage	Gambia	3–0	Pape Gueye, Lamine Camara (2)
(Ivory Coast) 2023	19 January 2024	(Ivory Coast) Yamoussoukro	Group stage	Cameroon	3–1	Ismaïla Sarr, Habib Diallo, Sadio Mané
(Ivory Coast) 2023	23 January 2024	(Ivory Coast) Yamoussoukro	Group stage	Guinea	2–0	Abdoulaye Seck, Iliman Ndiaye
(Ivory Coast) 2023	29 January 2024	(Ivory Coast) Yamoussoukro	Round of 16	Ivory Coast	1–1 (a.e.t.) (4–5 p)	Habib Diallo
(Morocco) 2025	23 December 2025	(Morocco) Tangier	Group stage	Botswana	3–0	Nicolas Jackson (2), Cherif Ndiaye
(Morocco) 2025	27 December 2025	(Morocco) Tangier	Group stage	DR Congo	1–1	Sadio Mané
(Morocco) 2025	30 December 2025	(Morocco) Tangier	Group stage	Benin	3–0	Abdoulaye Seck, Habib Diallo, Cherif Ndiaye
(Morocco) 2025	3 January 2026	(Morocco) Tangier	Round of 16	Sudan	3–1	Pape Gueye (2), Ibrahim Mbaye
(Morocco) 2025	9 January 2026	(Morocco) Tangier	Quarter-finals	Mali	1–0	Iliman Ndiaye
(Morocco) 2025	14 January 2026	(Morocco) Tangier	Semi-finals	Egypt	1–0	Sadio Mané
(Morocco) 2025	18 January 2026	(Morocco) Rabat	Final	Morocco	0–3 (awarded)	~~Pape Gueye~~

== See also ==
- Senegal at the FIFA World Cup
