= Bassala Touré =

Malian footballer (born 1976)

Personal information
- Date of birth: 21 February 1976 (age 50)
- Place of birth: Bamako, Mali
- Height: 1.71 m (5 ft 7 in)
- Position: Midfielder

Senior career*
Years	Team	Apps	(Gls)
1992	Stade Malien		
1993–1994	Kawkab Marrakech		
1997–1998	Al-Arabi		
1998–2002	Athinaikos	86	(5)
2002–2004	Kerkyra	35	(2)
2004–2009	Levadiakos	93	(2)
2009–2010	Ilioupoli	8	(0)
Total		222	(9)

International career
1994–2008	Mali	69	(11)
- * Club domestic league appearances and goals

Bassala Touré (born 21 February 1976) is a Malian former footballer who played at both professional and international levels as a midfielder.

== Career ==
Born in Bamako, Touré began his career with hometown club Stade Malien, before moving to Morocco to play with Kawkab Marrakech. After a spell in Kuwait with Al-Arabi, Touré spent twelve seasons in Greece, playing for Athinaikos, Kerkyra, Levadiakos and Ilioupoli.

Touré earned 69 caps for Mali between 1994 and 2008, including in seven FIFA World Cup qualifying games. He was also a squad member for the Africa Cup of Nations in 1994, 2002, 2004 and 2008.

== International goals ==
Scores and results list Mali's goal tally first, score column indicates score after each Touré goal.

List of international goals scored by Bassala Touré
No.	Date	Venue	Opponent	Score	Result	Competition	Ref.
1	30 October 1994	Stade Modibo Kéïta, Bamako, Mali	Guinea	1–0	2–0	1996 African Cup of Nations qualification	
2	7 January 1995	Botswana National Stadium, Gaborone, Botswana	Botswana	1–0	3–1	1996 African Cup of Nations qualification	
3	6 October 1996	Stade de l'Amitié, Cotonou, Benin	Benin	1–1	2–1	1998 African Cup of Nations qualification	
4	26 January 1997	Stade Modibo Kéïta, Bamako, Mali	Algeria	1–0	1–0	1998 African Cup of Nations qualification	
5	6 June 1999	Stade Modibo Kéïta, Bamako, Mali	Congo	1–0	3–1	2000 African Cup of Nations qualification	
6	28 December 2001	Stade Amary Daou, Ségou, Mali	Burkina Faso	2–0	2–1	Friendly	
7	28 January 2002	Stade du 26 Mars, Bamako, Mali	Algeria	2–0	2–0	2002 African Cup of Nations	
8	3 February 2002	Stade Abdoulaye Makoro Cissoko, Kayes, Mali	South Africa	1–0	2–0	2002 African Cup of Nations	
9	27 April 2003	Stade Déjerine, Paris, France	Madagascar	1–0	2–0	Friendly	
10	15 January 2004	Stade du 5 Juillet, Algiers, Algeria	Algeria	2–0	2–0	Friendly	
11	17 June 2007	Stade du 26 Mars, Bamako, Mali	Sierra Leone	6–0	6–0	2008 African Cup of Nations qualification	
