= Senegal at the FIFA World Cup =

International football delegation

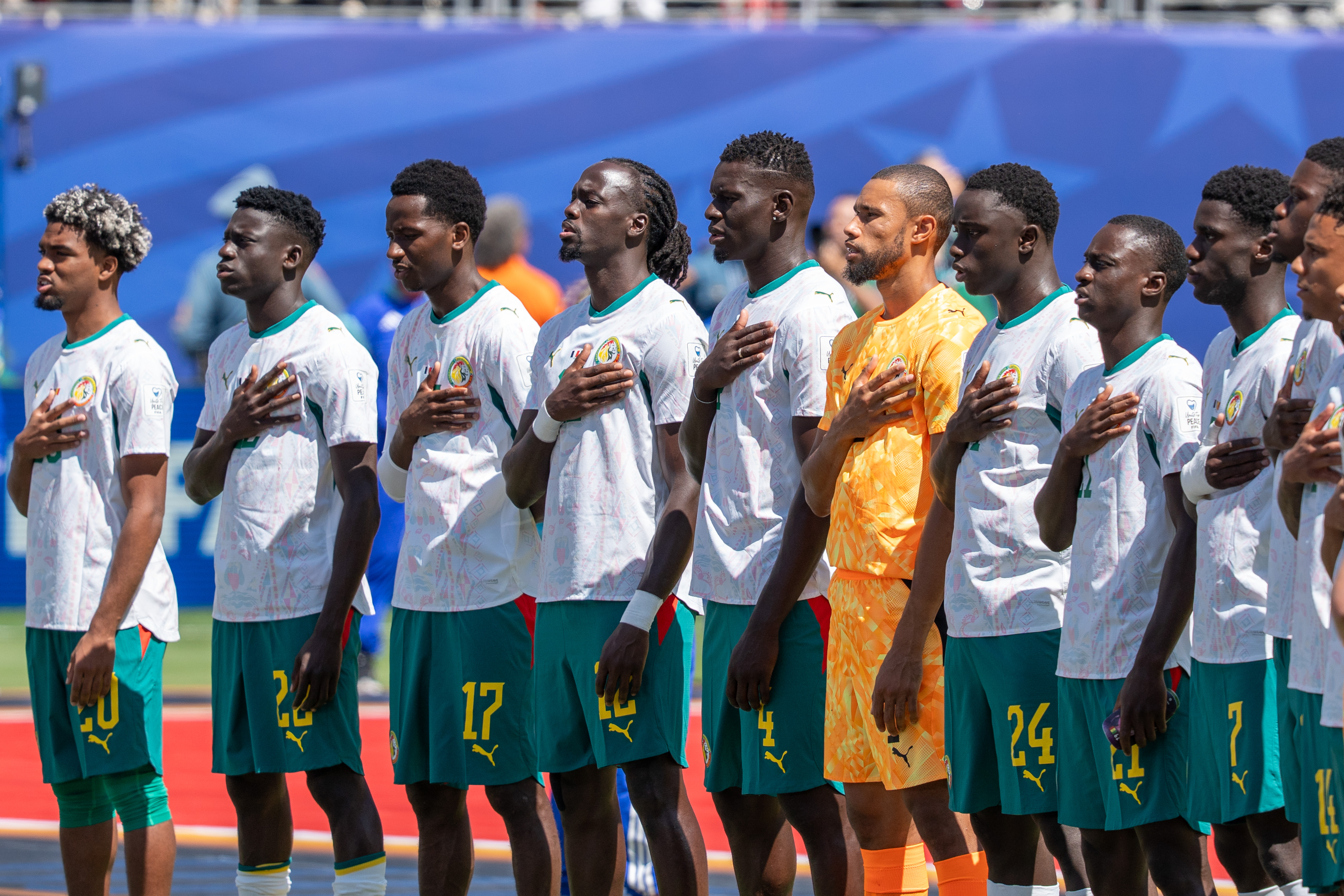
Senegalese players sing their national anthem ahead of their 2026 FIFA World Cup match against France

This is a record of Senegal's results at the FIFA World Cup. The FIFA World Cup, sometimes called the Football World Cup or the Soccer World Cup, but usually referred to simply as the World Cup, is an international association football competition contested by the men's national teams of the members of Fédération Internationale de Football Association (FIFA), the sport's global governing body. The championship has been awarded every four years since the first tournament in 1930, except in 1942 and 1946, due to World War II.

The tournament consists of two parts, the qualification phase and the final phase (officially called the World Cup Finals). The qualification phase, which currently take place over the three years preceding the Finals, is used to determine which teams qualify for the Finals. The current format of the Finals involves 48 teams competing for the title, at venues within the host nation (or nations) over a period of about a month. The World Cup final is the most widely viewed sporting event in the world, with an estimated 715.1 million people watching the 2006 tournament final.

Senegal have qualified for the World Cup on four occasions, in 2002, where they reached the quarter-finals, 2018, 2022, and 2026. At the 2018 World Cup, they were the first team in World Cup history to be eliminated using the fair play rule after being tied with Japan on the first six tiebreakers.

== FIFA World Cup record ==
FIFA World Cup record
Year	Round	Position	Pld	W	D	L	GF	GA
(Uruguay) 1930	Did not enter							
(Italy) 1934	Did not enter							
(France) 1938	Did not enter							
(Brazil) 1950	Did not enter							
(Switzerland) 1954	Did not enter							
(Sweden) 1958	Did not enter							
(Chile) 1962	Did not enter							
(England) 1966	Withdrew							
(Mexico) 1970	Did not qualify							
(West Germany) 1974	Did not qualify							
(Argentina) 1978	Did not qualify							
(Spain) 1982	Did not qualify							
(Mexico) 1986	Did not qualify							
(Italy) 1990	Withdrew							
(United States) 1994	Did not qualify							
(France) 1998	Did not qualify							
(South Korea) (Japan) 2002	Quarter-finals	7th	5	2	2	1	7	6
(Germany) 2006	Did not qualify							
(South Africa) 2010	Did not qualify							
(Brazil) 2014	Did not qualify							
(Russia) 2018	Group stage	17th	3	1	1	1	4	4
(Qatar) 2022	Round of 16	10th	4	2	0	2	5	7
(Canada) (Mexico) (United States) 2026	Round of 32	31st	4	1	0	3	10	9
(Morocco) (Portugal) (Spain) 2030	To be determined							
(Saudi Arabia) 2034	To be determined							
4/23	Quarter-finals	7th	16	6	3	7	26	26

== Senegal at the 2002 FIFA World Cup ==
=== Group A ===
Defending champions France were eliminated from Group A without scoring a goal after defeats to Denmark and debutants Senegal, who both progressed at the expense of two-time champions Uruguay.

Team	Pld	W	D	L	GF	GA	GD	Pts
Denmark	3	2	1	0	5	2	+3	7
Senegal	3	1	2	0	5	4	+1	5
Uruguay	3	0	2	1	4	5	−1	2
France	3	0	1	2	0	3	−3	1

31 May 2002
20:30

France	0–1	Senegal
	(Report)	Bouba Diop 30'

Seoul World Cup Stadium, Seoul
Attendance: 62,561
Referee: Ali Bujsaim (United Arab Emirates)

6 June 2002
15:30

Denmark	1–1	Senegal
Tomasson 16' (pen.)	(Report)	Diao 52'

Daegu World Cup Stadium, Daegu
Attendance: 43,500
Referee: Carlos Batres (Guatemala)

11 June 2002
15:30

Senegal	3–3	Uruguay
Fadiga 20' (pen.); Bouba Diop 26', 38'	(Report)	Morales 46'; Forlán 69'; Recoba 88' (pen.)

Suwon World Cup Stadium, Suwon
Attendance: 33,681
Referee: Jan Wegereef (Netherlands)

=== Round of 16 ===
16 June 2002
15:30

Sweden	1–2 (a.e.t.)	Senegal
Larsson 11'	(Report)	H. Camara 37' 104'

Oita Stadium, Ōita
Attendance: 39,747
Referee: Ubaldo Aquino (Paraguay)

=== Quarter-finals ===
22 June 2002
20:30

Senegal	0–1 (a.e.t.)	Turkey
	(Report)	İlhan 94'

Nagai Stadium, Osaka
Attendance: 44,233
Referee: Óscar Ruiz (Colombia)

== Senegal at the 2018 FIFA World Cup ==
=== Group H ===
Pos	Team	Pld	W	D	L	GF	GA	GD	Pts	Qualification
1	Colombia	3	2	0	1	5	2	+3	6	Advance to knockout stage
2	Japan	3	1	1	1	4	4	0	4 (Note: Fair play points: Japan −4, Senegal −6.)	Advance to knockout stage
3	Senegal	3	1	1	1	4	4	0	4	
4	Poland	3	1	0	2	2	5	−3	3	

Source: FIFA
Rules for classification: Group stage tiebreakers
Notes:
19 June 2018
18:00 MSK (UTC+3)

Poland	1–2	Senegal
Krychowiak 86'		Cionek 37' (o.g.); Niang 60'

Otkritie Arena, Moscow
Attendance: 44,190
Referee: Nawaf Shukralla (Bahrain)

24 June 2018
20:00 YEKT (UTC+5)

Japan	2–2	Senegal
Inui 34'; Honda 78'		Mané 11'; Wagué 71'

Central Stadium, Yekaterinburg
Attendance: 32,572
Referee: Gianluca Rocchi (Italy)

28 June 2018
18:00 SAMT (UTC+4)

Senegal	0–1	Colombia
		Mina 74'

Cosmos Arena, Samara
Attendance: 41,970
Referee: Milorad Mažić (Serbia)

== Senegal at the 2022 FIFA World Cup ==
=== Group stage ===
Pos	Team	Pld	W	D	L	GF	GA	GD	Pts	Qualification
1	Netherlands	3	2	1	0	5	1	+4	7	Advanced to knockout stage
2	Senegal	3	2	0	1	5	4	+1	6	Advanced to knockout stage
3	Ecuador	3	1	1	1	4	3	+1	4	
4	Qatar (H)	3	0	0	3	1	7	−6	0	

Source: FIFA
Rules for classification: Group stage tiebreakers
(H) Hosts
21 November 2022
19:00

Senegal	0–2	Netherlands
		Gakpo 84'; Klaassen 90+9'

Al Thumama Stadium, Doha
Attendance: 41,721
Referee: Wilton Sampaio (Brazil)

25 November 2022
16:00

Qatar	1–3	Senegal
Muntari 78'		Dia 41'; Diédhiou 48'; B. Dieng 84'

Al Thumama Stadium, Doha
Attendance: 41,797
Referee: Antonio Mateu Lahoz (Spain)

29 November 2022
18:00

Ecuador	1–2	Senegal
Caicedo 67'		I. Sarr 44' (pen.); Koulibaly 70'

Khalifa International Stadium, Al Rayyan
Attendance: 44,569
Referee: Clément Turpin (France)

=== Knockout stage ===
Round of 16

4 December 2022
22:00

England	3–0	Senegal
Henderson 38'; Kane 45+3'; Saka 57'

Al Bayt Stadium, Al Khor
Attendance: 65,985
Referee: Iván Barton (El Salvador)

== Senegal at the 2026 FIFA World Cup ==
=== Group stage ===
Pos	Team	Pld	W	D	L	GF	GA	GD	Pts	Qualification
1	France	3	3	0	0	10	2	+8	9	Advance to knockout stage
2	Norway	3	2	0	1	8	7	+1	6	Advance to knockout stage
3	Senegal	3	1	0	2	8	6	+2	3	Advance to knockout stage
4	Iraq	3	0	0	3	1	12	−11	0	

Source: FIFA
Rules for classification: Group stage tiebreakers
June 16, 2026
3:00 p.m. UTC−4

France	3–1	Senegal
Mbappé 66', 90+6'; Barcola 82'	(Note: "France vs Senegal | First Stage | FIFA World Cup 2026". FIFA. Retrieved June 16, 2026.; "Match Report – Group I – France v. Senegal". FIFA. Retrieved June 16, 2026.; "Post match summary report – Group I – France v. Senegal". FIFA. June 16, 2026. Retrieved June 17, 2026.)	Mbaye 90+5'

MetLife Stadium, East Rutherford
Attendance: 80,545
Referee: Alireza Faghani (Australia)

June 22, 2026
8:00 p.m. UTC−4

Norway	3–2	Senegal
Pedersen 43'; Haaland 48', 58'	(Note: "Norway vs Senegal | First Stage | FIFA World Cup 2026". FIFA. Retrieved June 23, 2026.; "Match Report – Group I – Norway v. Senegal". FIFA. June 23, 2026. Retrieved June 23, 2026.; "Post match summary report – Group I – Norway v. Senegal". FIFA. June 23, 2026. Retrieved June 23, 2026.)	I. Sarr 53', 90+3'

MetLife Stadium, East Rutherford
Attendance: 80,663
Referee: Wilton Sampaio (Brazil)

June 26, 2026
3:00 p.m. UTC−4

Senegal	5–0	Iraq
Diarra 4'; I. Sarr 56'; P. Gueye 59', 71'; I. Ndiaye 82'	(Note: "Senegal vs Iraq | First Stage | FIFA World Cup 2026". FIFA. Retrieved June 26, 2026.; "Match Report – Group I – Senegal v. Iraq". FIFA. June 26, 2026. Retrieved June 26, 2026.; "Post match summary report – Group I – Senegal v. Iraq". FIFA. June 26, 2026. Retrieved June 27, 2026.)

BMO Field, Toronto
Attendance: 43,036
Referee: Anthony Taylor (England)

=== Knockout stage ===
Round of 32

July 1, 2026
1:00 p.m. UTC−7

Belgium	3–2 (a.e.t.)	Senegal
Lukaku 86'; Tielemans 89', 120+5' (pen.)	(Note: "Belgium vs Senegal | Round of 32 | FIFA World Cup 2026". FIFA. Retrieved June 28, 2026.; "Match Report – Round of 32 – Belgium v. Senegal". FIFA. July 1, 2026. Retrieved July 1, 2026.; "Post match summary report – Round of 32 – Belgium v. Senegal". FIFA. July 1, 2026. Retrieved July 3, 2026.)	Diarra 25'; I. Sarr 51'

Lumen Field, Seattle
Attendance: 66,925
Referee: Saíd Martínez (Honduras)

== Head-to-head record ==
Opponent	Pld	W	D	L	GF	GA	GD	Win %
Belgium	1	0	0	1	2	3	−1	0.00
Colombia	1	0	0	1	0	1	−1	0.00
Denmark	1	0	1	0	1	1	+0	0.00
Ecuador	1	1	0	0	2	1	+1	100.00
England	1	0	0	1	0	3	−3	0.00
France	2	1	0	1	2	3	−1	50.00
Iraq	1	1	0	0	5	0	+5	100.00
Japan	1	0	1	0	2	2	+0	0.00
Netherlands	1	0	0	1	0	2	−2	0.00
Norway	1	0	0	1	2	3	−1	0.00
Poland	1	1	0	0	2	1	+1	100.00
Qatar	1	1	0	0	3	1	+2	100.00
Sweden	1	1	0	0	2	1	+1	100.00
Turkey	1	0	0	1	0	1	−1	0.00
Uruguay	1	0	1	0	3	3	+0	0.00
Total	15	6	3	6	24	23	+1	40.00

== Player records ==
=== Most appearances ===
Rank	Player	Matches	World Cups
1	Kalidou Koulibaly	9	2018, 2022 and 2026
1	Ismaïla Sarr	9	2018, 2022 and 2026
3	Idrissa Gueye	8	2018, 2022 and 2026
4	Youssouf Sabaly	7	2018 and 2022
5	Édouard Mendy	6	2022 and 2026
6	Pathé Ciss	5	2022 and 2026
6	Ferdinand Coly	5	2002
6	Omar Daf	5	2002
6	Krépin Diatta	5	2022 and 2026
6	Lamine Diatta	5	2002
6	Bamba Dieng	5	2022 and 2026
6	Papa Bouba Diop	5	2002
6	Papa Malick Diop	5	2002
6	El-Hadji Diouf	5	2002
6	Pape Gueye	5	2022 and 2026
6	Ismail Jakobs	5	2022 and 2026
6	Sadio Mané	5	2018 and 2026
6	Tony Sylva	5	2002

=== Goalscorers ===
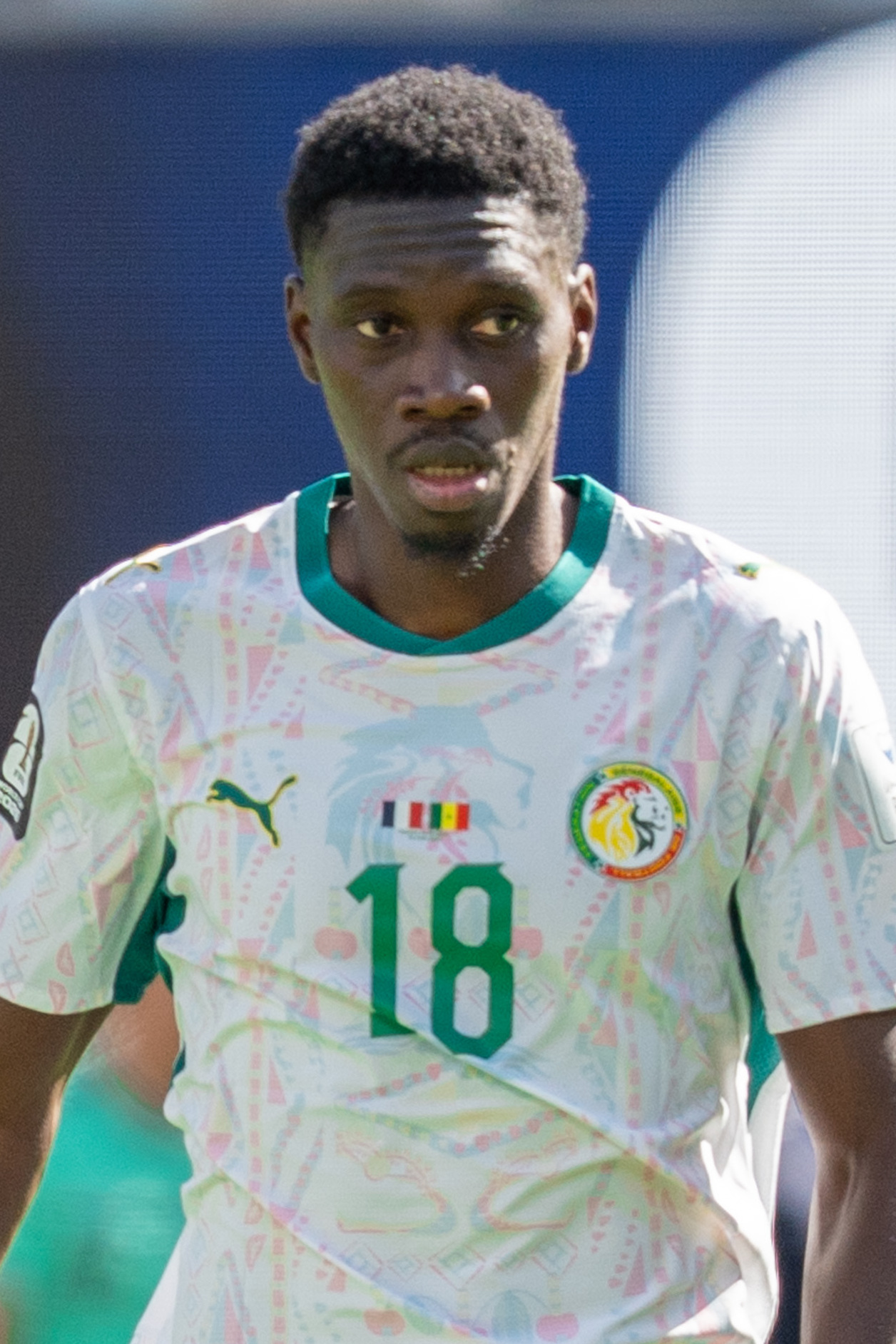
Ismaïla Sarr scored four goals at the 2026 World Cup, the most prolific Senegalese performance in World Cup history. He is also Senegal's overall top scorer at the tournament with five goals in total.

On 31st May 2002, Papa Bouba Diop made history by scoring Senegal's first-ever FIFA World Cup goal, doing so in their opening match against then-defending champions France in Seoul.

Player	Goals	2002	2018	2022	2026
Ismaïla Sarr	5			1	4
Papa Bouba Diop	3	3			
Henri Camara	2	2			
Pape Gueye	2				2
Habib Diarra	2				2
Salif Diao	1	1			
Khalilou Fadiga	1	1			
M'Baye Niang	1		1		
Sadio Mané	1		1		
Moussa Wagué	1		1		
Boulaye Dia	1			1	
Famara Diedhiou	1			1	
Bamba Dieng	1			1	
Kalidou Koulibaly	1			1	
Ibrahim Mbaye	1				1
Iliman Ndiaye	1				1
Total	25	7	3	5	10

== See also ==
- African nations at the FIFA World Cup
- Senegal at the Africa Cup of Nations
