= Mali national football team results (2000–2009) =

Intentionally left blank

This article provides details of international football games played by the Mali national football team from 2000 to 2009.

== Results ==
=== 2000 ===
9 April 2000 2002 World Cup qualification	Libya	3–0	Mali	Tripoli, Libya
				Stadium: June 11 Stadium

23 April 2000 2002 World Cup qualification	Mali	3–1	Libya	Bamako, Mali
				Stadium: Stade Modibo Kéïta

5 May 2000 2000 Amílcar Cabral Cup	Guinea	3–1	Mali	Cape Verde

7 May 2000 2000 Amílcar Cabral Cup	Mali	3–2	Guinea-Bissau	Cape Verde

9 May 2000 2000 Amílcar Cabral Cup	Mali	2–2	Mauritania	Cape Verde

11 May 2000 2000 Amílcar Cabral Cup	Mali	2–2	Senegal	Cape Verde

14 May 2000 2000 Amílcar Cabral Cup	Guinea	2–0	Mali	Cape Verde

=== 2001 ===
20 January 2001 Friendly	Mali	0–1	Guinea	Mali

23 January 2001 Friendly	Burkina Faso	0–2	Mali	Burkina Faso

4 February 2001 Friendly	Senegal	1–0	Mali	Senegal

18 March 2001 Friendly	Gabon	2–0	Mali	Gabon

14 October 2001 Friendly	Mali	2–1	Morocco	Mali

3 November 2001 2001 Amílcar Cabral Cup	Mali	3–2	Mauritania	Bamako, Mali

5 November 2001 2001 Amílcar Cabral Cup	Mali	2–0	Guinea-Bissau	Ségou, Mali

7 November 2001 2001 Amílcar Cabral Cup	Mali	0–0	Benin	Ségou, Mali

9 November 2001 2001 Amílcar Cabral Cup	Mali	0–1	Gambia	Mali

11 November 2001 2001 Amílcar Cabral Cup	Mali	2–1	Guinea-Bissau	Mali

5 December 2001 Friendly	Mali	0–3	Ivory Coast	Mali

12 December 2001 Friendly	Morocco	1–1	Mali	Morocco

25 December 2001 Friendly	Mali	1–1	Ghana	Mali

28 December 2001 Friendly	Mali	1–1	Burkina Faso	Mali

=== 2002 ===
6 January 2002 Friendly	Egypt	1–2	Mali	Egypt

10 January 2002 Friendly	Mali	1–1	Zambia	Mali

19 January 2002 2002 AFCON	Mali	1–1	Liberia	Bamako, Mali
				Stadium: Stade du 26 Mars

24 January 2002 2002 AFCON	Mali	0–0	Nigeria	Bamako, Mali
				Stadium: Stade du 26 Mars

28 January 2002 2002 AFCON	Mali	2–0	Algeria	Bamako, Mali
				Stadium: Stade du 26 Mars

3 February 2002 2002 AFCON	South Africa	0–2	Mali	Kayes, Mali
				Stadium: Stade Abdoulaye Makoro Cissoko

7 February 2002 2002 AFCON	Mali	0–3	Cameroon	Bamako, Mali
				Stadium: Stade du 26 Mars

9 February 2002 2002 AFCON	Nigeria	1–0	Mali	Mopti, Mali
				Stadium: Stade Barema Bocoum

8 September 2002 2004 AFCON Q	Zimbabwe	1–0	Mali

2 October 2002 Friendly	Mali	2–1	Mauritania

5 October 2002 Friendly	Mali	2–0	Mauritania

13 October 2002 2004 AFCON Q	Mali	3–0	Seychelles

20 November 2002 Friendly	Morocco	1–3	Mali

29 December 2002 Friendly	Niger	2–2	Mali

=== 2003 ===
12 February 2003 Friendly	Mali	1–0	Guinea	France

30 March 2003 2004 AFCON Q	Eritrea	0–2	Mali	Eritrea

27 April 2003 Friendly	Mali	2–0	Madagascar	France

7 June 2003 2004 AFCON Q	Mali	1–0	Eritrea	Mali

22 June 2003 2004 AFCON Q	Mali	0–0	Zimbabwe	Mali

5 July 2003 2004 AFCON Q	Seychelles	0–2	Mali	Seychelles

10 October 2003 2006 FIFA World Cup qualification – CAF first round	Guinea-Bissau	1–2	Mali	Guinea-Bissau

14 November 2003 2006 FIFA World Cup qualification – CAF first round	Mali	2–0	Guinea-Bissau	Mali

19 November 2003 Friendly	Morocco	0–1	Mali	Morocco

=== 2004 ===
15 January 2004 Friendly	Algeria	0–2	Mali	Algeria

26 January 2004 2004 AFCON	Kenya	1–3	Mali	Bizerte, Tunisia
				Stadium: Stade 15 Octobre

30 January 2004 2004 AFCON	Burkina Faso	1–3	Mali	Tunis, Tunisia
				Stadium: Stade El Menzah

2 February 2004 2004 AFCON	Senegal	1–1	Mali	Tunis, Tunisia
				Stadium: Stade El Menzah

7 February 2004 2004 AFCON	Mali	2–1	Guinea	Tunis, Tunisia
				Stadium: Stade El Menzah

11 February 2004 2004 AFCON	Morocco	4–0	Mali	Sousse, Tunisia
				Stadium: Stade Olympique de Sousse

13 February 2004 2004 AFCON	Nigeria	2–1	Mali	Monastir, Tunisia
				Stadium: Stade Mustapha Ben Jannet

28 April 2004 Friendly	Tunisia	1–0	Mali	Tunisia

28 May 2004 Friendly	Mali	0–0	Morocco	Mali

6 June 2004 2006 World Cup qualification	Liberia	1–0	Mali	Liberia

19 June 2004 2006 World Cup qualification	Mali	1–1	Zambia	Mali

4 July 2004 2006 World Cup qualification	Congo	1–0	Mali	Congo

18 August 2004 Friendly	Mali	3–0	DR Congo	France

5 September 2004 2006 World Cup qualification	Mali	2–2	Senegal	Mali

10 October 2004 2006 World Cup qualification	Togo	1–0	Mali	Togo

=== 2005 ===
9 February 2005 Friendly	Guinea	2–2	Mali	Guinea

27 March 2005 2006 World Cup qualification	Mali	1–2	Togo	Mali

9 April 2005 2005 Islamic Solidarity Games	Mali	0–0	Syria	Saudi Arabia

12 April 2005 2005 Islamic Solidarity Games	Chad	1–4	Mali	Saudi Arabia

15 April 2005 2005 Islamic Solidarity Games	Morocco	1–0	Mali	Saudi Arabia

5 June 2005 2006 World Cup qualification	Mali	4–1	Liberia	Mali

12 June 2005 Friendly	Mali	3–0	Algeria	France

18 June 2005 2006 World Cup qualification	Zambia	2–1	Mali	Zambia

3 September 2005 2006 World Cup qualification	Mali	2–0	Congo	Mali

8 October 2005 2006 World Cup qualification	Senegal	3–0	Mali	Senegal

=== 2006 ===
28 May 2006 Friendly	Mali	1–0	Morocco	France

16 August 2006 Friendly	Mali	1–0	Tunisia	France

3 September 2006 2008 AFCON Q	Sierra Leone	0–0	Mali	Sierra Leone

8 October 2006 2008 AFCON Q	Mali	1–0	Togo	Mali

14 November 2006 Friendly	Mali	1–0	Congo	France

=== 2007 ===
6 February 2007 Friendly	Mali	3–1	Lithuania	France

25 March 2007 2008 AFCON Q	Mali	1–1	Benin	Mali

3 June 2007 2008 AFCON Q	Benin	0–0	Mali	Benin

9 June 2007 Friendly	Burkina Faso	0–1	Mali	Burkina Faso

17 June 2007 2008 AFCON Q	Mali	6–0	Sierra Leone	Mali

22 August 2007 Friendly	Mali	3–2	Burkina Faso	France

12 October 2007 2008 AFCON Q	Togo	0–2	Mali	Togo

17 November 2007 Friendly	Senegal	3–2	Mali	France

20 November 2007 Friendly	Algeria	3–2	Mali	France

=== 2008 ===
10 January 2008 Friendly	Egypt	1–0	Mali	United Arab Emirates

21 January 2008 2008 AFCON	Mali	1–0	Benin	Sekondi-Takoradi, Ghana
				Stadium: Sekondi Stadium

25 January 2008 2008 AFCON	Nigeria	0–0	Mali	Sekondi-Takoradi, Ghana
				Stadium: Sekondi Stadium

29 January 2008 2008 AFCON	Ivory Coast	3–0	Mali	Accra, Ghana
				Stadium: Ohene Djan Stadium

1 June 2008 2010 World Cup qualification	Mali	4–2	Congo	Bamako, Mali
				Stadium: Stade du 26 Mars

7 June 2008 2010 World Cup qualification	Chad	1–2	Mali	Chad

14 June 2008 2010 World Cup qualification	Sudan	3–2	Mali	Sudan

22 June 2008 2010 World Cup qualification	Mali	3–0	Sudan	Bamako, Mali
				Stadium: Stade du 26 Mars

19 August 2008 Friendly	Gabon	1–0	Mali	France

7 September 2008 2010 World Cup qualification	Congo	1–0	Mali	Congo

11 October 2008 2010 World Cup qualification	Mali	2–1	Chad	Bamako, Mali
				Stadium: Stade du 26 Mars

18 November 2008 Friendly	Algeria	1–1	Mali	France

=== 2009 ===
11 February 2009 Friendly	Mali	4–0	Angola	France

28 March 2009 2010 World Cup qualification	Sudan	1–1	Mali	Omdurman, Sudan
				Stadium: Al-Merrikh Stadium

25 April 2009 Friendly	Mali	3–0	Equatorial Guinea	Mali

7 June 2009 2010 World Cup qualification	Mali	0–2	Ghana	Bamako, Mali
				Stadium: Stade du 26 Mars

21 June 2009 2010 World Cup qualification	Mali	3–1	Benin	Bamako, Mali
				Stadium: Stade du 26 Mars

12 August 2009 Friendly	Mali	3–0	Burkina Faso	France

6 September 2009 2010 World Cup qualification	Benin	1–1	Mali	Cotonou, Benin
				Stadium: Stade de l'Amitié

11 October 2009 2010 World Cup qualification	Mali	1–0	Sudan	Bamako, Mali
				Stadium: Stade du 26 Mars

15 November 2009 2010 World Cup qualification	Ghana	2–2	Mali	Kumasi, Ghana
				Stadium: Baba Yara Stadium

27 December 2009 9th International Friendship Tournament	North Korea	1–0	Mali	Qatar

30 December 2009 9th International Friendship Tournament	Mali	2–1	Iran	Qatar
