= Timeline of Malian football =

1930s – 1940s – 1950s – 1960s – 1970s – 1980s – 1990s – 2000s – 2010s

== 1930s ==
1938

=== 1938 ===
- Jeanne d'Arc du Soudan, later Bamako, the early club established

== 1940s ==
1945

=== 1945 ===
- Mamahira AC founded

== 1950s ==
1950 – 1951 – 1952 – 1953 – 1955 – 1956 – 1959

=== 1950 ===
- Jeanne d'Arc de Bamako won their first Coupe de Soudan

=== 1951 ===
- Jeanne d'Arc de Bamako won their second Coupe du Soudan

=== 1952 ===
- Jeanne d'Arc de Bamako won their third Coupe du Soudan

=== 1953 ===
- Jeanne d'Arc de Bamako won their first French West African Cup title

=== 1955 ===
- Jeanne d'Arc de Bamako won their fourth and final Coupe du Soudan

=== 1956 ===
- Jeanne d'Arc de Bamako won their second and last French West African Cup

=== 1959 ===
- The early Coupe du Mali held its last edition

== 1960s ==
1960 – 1961 – 1962 – 1963 – 1964 – 1965 – 1966 – 1967 – 1968 – 1969

=== 1960 ===
- Cercle Olympique de Bamako (COB) football club founded
- Djoliba AC founded after a merger with Africa Sport and Foyer du Soudan.
- AS Real Bamako sports club founded
- Stade Malien de Bamako founded after a merger of Jeanne d'Arc and Espérance de Bamako
- Mali declared independence from France

=== 1961 ===
- Stade Malien won their first national cup title

=== 1962 ===
- Real Bamako won their first national cup title

=== 1963 ===
- Stade Malien won their second national cup title

=== 1964 ===
- Real Bamako won their second national cup title

=== 1965 ===
- USFAS Bamako sports club founded
- Djoliba AC won their first national cup title
- The Malian Olympic team finishes 2nd in the All-Africa Games in Brazzaville

=== 1966 ===
- Malian Regional Championships established. It is now called the Premier Division
- Real Bamako won their third national cup title
- Djoliba AC became the first club to win a championship title

=== 1967 ===
- Real Bamako won their fourth national cup title
- Djoliba AC won their second championship title for Mali

=== 1968 ===
- Real Bamako won their fifth national cup title
- Djoliba AC won their third championship title for Mali

=== 1969 ===
- AS Real Bamako became the second Malian club to win a championship title. They also won their sixth national cup title

== 1970s ==
1970 – 1971 – 1972 – 1973 – 1974 – 1975 – 1976 – 1977 – 1978 – 1979

=== 1970 ===
- Stade Malien became the third and recent club in the nation to get a championship title
- Stade Malien won their third national cup title

=== 1971 ===
- Djoliba AC won their fourth national championship title
- Djoliba AC won their second national cup title

=== 1972 ===
- Stade Malien won their fourth national cup title
- Stade Malien won their second national championship title
- The national team of mali finishes 2nd the cup of africa of the nations which takes place in cameroon

=== 1973 ===
- Djoliba AC won their third national cup title
- Djoliba AC won their fifth national championship title

=== 1974 ===
- Djoliba AC won their fourth national cup title
- Djoliba AC won their sixth national championship title

=== 1975 ===
- Djoliba AC won their fifth national cup title
- Djoliba AC won their seventh national championship title

=== 1976 ===
- Djoliba AC won their sixth national cup title
- Djoliba AC won their eighth national championship title

=== 1977 ===
- Djoliba won their seventh national cup title
- No national championship took place for the next two seasons

=== 1978 ===
- Djoliba won their eighth national cup title

=== 1979 ===
- AS Nianan founded
- AS Sigui founded
- Djoliba won their ninth national cup title
- Djoliba AC won their ninth national championship title

== 1980s ==
1980 – 1981 – 1982 – 1983 – 1984 – 1985 – 1986 – 1987 – 1988 – 1989

=== 1980 ===
- Real Bamako won their seventh national cup title
- AS Real Bamako won their second national championship title

=== 1981 ===
- Djoliba won their tenth national cup title
- AS Real Bamako won their third national championship title

=== 1982 ===
- Stade Malien won their fifth national cup title
- Djoliba won their tenth national championship title

=== 1983 ===
- Djoliba AC won their 11th national cup title
- AS Real Bamako won their fourth national championship title

=== 1984 ===
- Stade Malien won their sixth national cup title
- Stade Malien won their third national championship title

=== 1985 ===
- Stade Malien won their seventh national cup title
- Djoliba AC won their eleventh national championship title

=== 1986 ===
- Stade Malien won their eighth national cup title
- AS Real Bamako won their fifth national championship title

=== 1987 ===
- AS Sigui won their only cup title, the fourth club to get an official football honour
- Stade Malien won their fourth national championship title

=== 1988 ===
- Stade Malien won their ninth national cup title
- Djoliba AC won their 12th national championship title

=== 1989 ===
- AS Bakaridjan sports club founded
- Real Bamako won their eighth national cup title
- Stade Malien won their fifth national championship title

== 1990s ==
1990 – 1991 – 1992 – 1993 – 1994 – 1995 – 1996 – 1997 – 1998 – 1999

=== 1990 ===
- Stade Malien won their 10th national cup title
- Djoliba AC won their 13th national championship title

=== 1991 ===
- Real Bamako won their ninth national cup title
- AS Real Bamako won their sixth and last national championship title

=== 1992 ===
- Stade Malien won their 11th national cup title
- Djoliba AC won their 14th national championship title
- Stade Malien won their only WAFU Club Championship title

=== 1993 ===
- Centre Salif Keita football club founded
- Djoliba won their 12th national cup title
- Stade Malien won their sixth national championship title
- Djoliba won their first national super cup title

=== 1994 ===
- Stade Malien won their 12th national cup title
- Stade Malien won their seventh national championship title
- Djoliba won their second national super cup title
- The national team of football finishes 4th at the cup of Africa of the nations in Tunisia

=== 1995 ===
- USFAS Bamako won their only national cup title and became the fifth club to get an official football honour
- Stade Malien won their eighth national championship title
- No Super Cup competitions taken place for the next two seasons

=== 1996 ===
- Djoliba won their 13th national cup title
- Djoliba AC won their 15th national championship title

=== 1997 ===
- Stade Malien won their 13th national cup title
- Djoliba AC won their 16th national championship title
- Djoliba AC won their third national super cup title

=== 1998 ===
- Djoliba won their 14th national cup title
- Djoliba AC won their 17th national championship title
- Stade Malien won their first national super cup title

=== 1999 ===
- AS Bamako football club founded
- Stade Malien won their 14th national cup title
- Djoliba AC won their 18th national championship title
- Djoliba AC won their fourth national super cup title
- The national team under 20 finishes at the 3rd place of the world cup held in Nigeria and the player Seydou Keita receives the prize of the best player of the tournament

== 2000s ==
2000 – 2001 – 2002 – 2003 – 2004 – 2005 – 2006 – 2007 – 2008 – 2009

=== 2000 ===
- Cercle Olympique de Bamako (COB) won their first national cup title and became the seventh club to get an official football honour
- Stade Malien won their ninth regional championship title
- Stade Malien won their second national super cup

=== 2001 ===
- Stade Malien won their 15th national cup title
- Stade Malien won their tenth regional championship title
- Stade Malien won their third national super cup

=== 2002 ===
- Cercle Olympique won their second national cup title
- Stade Malien won their 11th regional championship title
- The national football team finished 4th at the Africa Cup of Nations as host country
- No Super Cup competitions took place for the next three seasons

=== 2003 ===
- Djoliba won their 15th national cup title

Stade Malien won their 12th regional championship title

=== 2004 ===
- Djoliba won their 16th national cup title
- Djoliba AC won their 19th national championship title
- The Mali finishes fourth of the cup of Africa of the nations which is held in Tunisia

=== 2005 ===
- AS Bamako won their only national cup title and became the eighth club to get an official football honour
- Stade Malien won their 13th national championship title
- Stade Malien won their fourth national super cup title

=== 2006 ===
- Stade Malien won their 16th national cup title
- Stade Malien won their 14th national championship title
- Stade Malien won their fifth national super cup title

=== 2007 ===
- Djoliba won their 17th national cup title
- Stade Malien won their 15th national championship title
- Stade Malien won their sixth national super cup title

=== 2008 ===
- Djoliba won their 18th national cup title
- Djoliba AC won their 20th national championship title
- Djoliba AC won their fifth national super cup title
- Jeanne d'Arc de Bamako founded after a separation from Stade Malien
- In the 44th minute of the match of the Bamako District's Mayor Cup, Djoliba supporters rioted, attacking officials, other fans, and journalists. The match was called off, and several days later, awarded to Stade. Djoliba were fined 500,000 CFA frans, all payments for previous matches were withdrawn, and they were excluded form the 2009 competition. Stade received the trophy and a 750,000 CFA francs award from the Mayor of Bamako Adama Sangaré on 23 September.

=== 2009 ===
- US Bougouni sports club founded
- Djoliba won their 19th and recent national cup title
- Djoliba AC won their 21st national championship title
- Stade Malien became the only Malian club to have a CAF Confederation Cup title
- Stade Malien won their seventh national super cup title

== 2010s ==
2010 – 2011 – 2012 – 2013 – 2014 – 2015 – 2016 – 2017

=== 2010 ===
- Real Bamako won their seventh and recent national cup title
- Stade Malien won their 16th national championship title
- Stade Malien won their eighth national super cup title

=== 2011 ===
- Cercle Olympique won their third and recent national cup title
- Stade Malien won their 17th national championship title
- Cercle Olympique won their only national super cup title

=== 2012 ===
- US Bougouni won their only national cup title and became the ninth club to get an official football honour
- Djoilba AC won their 22nd and recent national championship title
- Djoliba AC won their sixth national super cup title
- The national football team finished in the 3rd place of the Africa Cup of Nations after beating Ghana in the match for the 3rd place (2-0).

=== 2013 ===
- Stade Malien won their 17th national cup title
- Stade Malien won their 18th national championship title
- Djoliba AC won their seventh and recent national super cup title
- The national football team finished in the 3rd place of the African Cup of Nations after beating Ghana in the match for the 3rd (3-1).

=== 2014 ===
- Onze Créateurs de Niaréla won their first national cup title and became the tenth and recent club to get an official football honour
- Stade Malien won their 19th national championship title
- Stade Malien won their ninth national super cup title

=== 2015 ===
- Stade Malien won their 18th and recent national cup title
- Stade Malien won their 20th national championship title
- Stade Malien won their tenth and recent super cup title
- The National Under-20 Team finished third in the World Cup in New Zealand after defeating Senegal (3-1) and Adama Traoré was awarded the Best Player of the Tournament award
- The national selection u17 becomes the first selection Mali any age categories confused to win a continental title after having disposed of South Africa by 2 goal to zero in final
- The U17 selection finishes 2nd in the World Cup held in Chile. The Malian Aly Malle finished 3rd best player of the tournament and the player Samuel Diarra obtains the reward of the best guardian of the tournament

=== 2016 ===
- Onze Créateurs de Niaréla won their second and recent national cup title
- Stade Malien won their 21st and recent national championship title
- Onze Créateus won their only national super cup title

=== 2017 ===
- the President of Mali dissolved the Malian Football Federation for two months, the Malien Premier Division went to a two month halt.
- FIFA banned the Malian Football Federation from competition from March 10 to early May which meant all clubs including Djoilba were banned from competing at the CAF Champions League and the CAF Confederation Cup
- the 2017 Malian Premier Division resumes in early May after nearly two months of cancellation
- The U17 selection retains its title of African champion by beating Ghana 1–0 in the final. Alassane Diaby is named best player of the competition
- October 29: Five clubs AS Bamako, Centre Salif Kéïta, Bamako, Djoliba and Duguwolofila refused to play in the 21st and 22nd rounds
- November 8: After the date, no further Premier Division matches were played
- December: Premier Division abandoned, no title awarded, no clubs relegated

== See also ==
- Timeline of association football
