= 2002 African Cup of Nations final =

- Event: 2002 African Cup of Nations
Senegal	Cameroon
(Senegal)	(Cameroon)
0	0
- After extra time Cameroon won 3–2 on penalties
- Date: 10 February 2002
- Venue: Stade du 26 Mars, Bamako
- Referee: Gamal Al-Ghandour (Egypt)
- Attendance: 50,000

The 2002 African Cup of Nations final was a football match that took place on 10 February 2002 at the Stade du 26 Mars in Bamako, Mali, to determine the winner of the 2002 African Cup of Nations, the football championship of Africa organized by the Confederation of African Football (CAF).

Cameroon won the title for the fourth time by beating Senegal 3–2 on penalties.

== Match details ==
=== Details ===
13 February 2002
15:00

Senegal	0–0 (a.e.t.)	Cameroon
	Report
Penalties
Coly (penalty scored); Fadiga (penalty scored); Faye (penalty missed); Diouf (penalty missed); Cissé (penalty missed)	2–3	(penalty missed) Womé; (penalty scored) Suffo; (penalty scored) Lauren; (penalty scored) Geremi; (penalty missed) Song

Stade du 26 Mars, Bamako
Attendance: 50,000
Referee: Gamal Al-Ghandour (Egypt)

Senegal	Cameroon

GK	1	Tony Sylva
RB	17	Ferdinand Coly	(yellow card) 95'
CB	13	Lamine Diatta
CB	19	Papa Bouba Diop		(substituted off) 91'
LB	2	Omar Daf
CM	22	Makhtar N'Diaye		(substituted off) 46'
CM	6	Aliou Cissé (c)
CM	15	Salif Diao
RF	11	El Hadji Diouf	(yellow card) 90'
CF	7	Henri Camara	(yellow card) 88'	(substituted off) 106'
LF	10	Khalilou Fadiga
Substitutions:
MF	14	Moussa N'Diaye		(substituted on) 46'
MF	12	Amdy Faye		(substituted on) 91'
FW	9	Souleymane Camara		(substituted on) 106'
Manager:
(France) Bruno Metsu

GK	1	Alioum Boukar
RB	12	Lauren
CB	5	Raymond Kalla
CB	4	Rigobert Song (c)
LB	2	Bill Tchato	(yellow card) 60'
DM	17	Marc-Vivien Foé	(yellow card) 23'
RM	8	Geremi
LM	3	Pierre Womé
AM	20	Salomon Olembé
CF	9	Samuel Eto'o	(yellow card) 62'
CF	11	Pius N'Diefi		(substituted off) 104'
Substitutions:
FW	18	Patrick Suffo		(substituted on) 104'
Manager:
(Germany) Winfried Schäfer
