= 1956 French Sudan by-election =

A by-election to the French National Assembly was held in French Sudan on 8 July 1956 following the death of Mamadou Konaté of the Sudanese Union – African Democratic Rally (US−RDA), one of the territory's four MPs. US−RDA candidate Baréma Bocoum was elected.

== Results ==
Candidate	Party	Votes	%
Baréma Bocoum	Sudanese Union – African Democratic Rally	159,441	62.37
Yalla Sidibé	Sudanese Progressive Party	88,719	34.71
Tidiani Faganda Traoré	Independent Progressive Action	7,461	2.92
Total		255,621	100.00
Valid votes		255,621	98.96
Invalid/blank votes		2,694	1.04
Total votes		258,315	100.00
Registered voters/turnout		1,072,957	24.08
Source: De Benoist, Sternberger et al.
