= 2018 FIFA World Cup Group H =

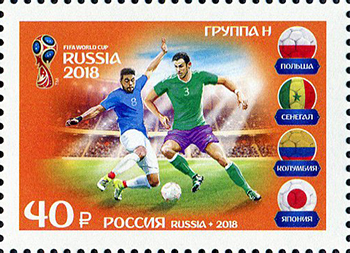
2018 postage stamp from Russia depicting Group H of the 2018 FIFA World Cup group stage.

Group H of the 2018 FIFA World Cup took place from 19 to 28 June 2018. The group consisted of Poland, Senegal, Colombia, and Japan. The top two teams, Colombia and Japan, advanced to the round of 16. For the first time in World Cup history, the "fair play" rule was invoked to break a tie. Japan and Senegal finished with identical scores and goal differences to tie for second behind Colombia. Japan were awarded the place in the round of 16 based on receiving fewer yellow cards in their three matches.

== Teams ==
Draw position	Team	Pot	Confederation	Method of qualification	Date of qualification	Finals appearance	Last appearance	Previous best performance	FIFA Rankings	
Draw position	Team	Pot	Confederation	Method of qualification	Date of qualification	Finals appearance	Last appearance	Previous best performance	October 2017 (Note: The rankings of October 2017 were used for seeding for the final draw.)	June 2018
H1	Poland	1	UEFA	UEFA Group E winners	8 October 2017	8th	2006	Third place (1974, 1982)	6	8
H2	Senegal	3	CAF	CAF third round group D winners	10 November 2017	2nd	2002	Quarter-finals (2002)	32	27
H3	Colombia	2	CONMEBOL	CONMEBOL Round Robin fourth place	10 October 2017	6th	2014	Quarter-finals (2014)	13	16
H4	Japan	4	AFC	AFC third round group B winners	31 August 2017	6th	2014	Round of 16 (2002, 2010)	44	61

== Standings ==
Pos	Team	Pld	W	D	L	GF	GA	GD	Pts	Qualification
1	Colombia	3	2	0	1	5	2	+3	6	Advance to knockout stage
2	Japan	3	1	1	1	4	4	0	4 (Note: Fair play points: Japan −4, Senegal −6.)	Advance to knockout stage
3	Senegal	3	1	1	1	4	4	0	4	
4	Poland	3	1	0	2	2	5	−3	3	

Source: FIFA
Rules for classification: Group stage tiebreakers
Notes:

In the round of 16:

- The winners of Group H, Colombia, advanced to play the runners-up of Group G, England.
- The runners-up of Group H, Japan, advanced to play the winners of Group G, Belgium.

== Matches ==
All times listed are local time.

=== Colombia vs Japan ===
The two teams had met in three previous matches, most recently in a 2014 FIFA World Cup group stage game, won by Colombia 4–1.

In the third minute, Carlos Sánchez blocked Shinji Kagawa's 20-yard shot with his arm, denying an obvious goal scoring opportunity and the referee pointed to the penalty spot before showing the midfielder a straight red card. After lengthy protests, Sánchez eventually left the field and Kagawa slotted the penalty into the bottom right corner of the net. José Pékerman then replaced Juan Cuadrado with Wílmar Barrios at the half-hour mark, and an equaliser arrived nine minutes later, from a Juan Fernando Quintero free kick, shot low under the jumping wall which the goalkeeper failed to keep out. In the second half, David Ospina dived full length to his left to stop Takashi Inui's curling 20-yard shot. Yuya Osako then headed the ball into the far corner of the net from a Keisuke Honda corner from the left. With 13 minutes left, James Rodríguez's strike from inside the box was turned over the crossbar by the outstretched leg of Osako.

Quintero became the first Colombian player in history to score at two World Cups. Japan became the first Asian team to beat a side from South America in the competition's history. Honda became the first player from an Asian nation to provide an assist in three different World Cup tournaments since 1966. Eiji Kawashima (35 years, 91 days) became the oldest player to appear for Japan in a World Cup finals match.

19 June 2018
15:00 MSK (UTC+3)

Colombia	1–2	Japan
Quintero 39'		Kagawa 6' (pen.); Osako 73'

Mordovia Arena, Saransk
Attendance: 40,842
Referee: Damir Skomina (Slovenia)

Colombia	Japan

GK	1	David Ospina
RB	4	Santiago Arias
CB	23	Davinson Sánchez
CB	3	Óscar Murillo
LB	17	Johan Mojica
CM	6	Carlos Sánchez	(red card) 3'
CM	16	Jefferson Lerma
RW	11	Juan Cuadrado		(substituted off) 31'
AM	20	Juan Fernando Quintero		(substituted off) 59'
LW	21	José Izquierdo		(substituted off) 70'
CF	9	Radamel Falcao (c)
Substitutions:
MF	5	Wílmar Barrios	(yellow card) 64'	(substituted on) 31'
MF	10	James Rodríguez	(yellow card) 86'	(substituted on) 59'
FW	7	Carlos Bacca		(substituted on) 70'
Manager:
(Argentina) José Pékerman

GK	1	Eiji Kawashima	(yellow card) 90+4'
RB	19	Hiroki Sakai
CB	22	Maya Yoshida
CB	3	Gen Shoji
LB	5	Yuto Nagatomo
CM	17	Makoto Hasebe (c)
CM	7	Gaku Shibasaki		(substituted off) 80'
RW	8	Genki Haraguchi
AM	10	Shinji Kagawa		(substituted off) 70'
LW	14	Takashi Inui
CF	15	Yuya Osako		(substituted off) 85'
Substitutions:
MF	4	Keisuke Honda		(substituted on) 70'
MF	16	Hotaru Yamaguchi		(substituted on) 80'
FW	9	Shinji Okazaki		(substituted on) 85'
Manager:
Akira Nishino

Man of the Match:
Yuya Osako (Japan)

Assistant referees:
Jure Praprotnik (Slovenia)
Robert Vukan (Slovenia)
Fourth official:
Mehdi Abid Charef (Algeria)
Reserve assistant referee:
Anouar Hmila (Tunisia)
Video assistant referee:
Danny Makkelie (Netherlands)
Assistant video assistant referees:
Bastian Dankert (Germany)
Sander van Roekel (Netherlands)
Felix Zwayer (Germany)

=== Poland vs Senegal ===
The two teams had never met before.

Senegal had the first clear chance in the 18th minute, M'Baye Niang dragging an effort wide after a break. Senegal took the lead when Idrissa Gueye's 20-yard shot took a huge deflection off Thiago Cionek to flick in Poland goalkeeper Wojciech Szczęsny's goal and give Senegal the lead. Robert Lewandowski stepped up to float a 25-yard free-kick over the wall, Khadim N'Diaye dived to turn the ball away. Grzegorz Krychowiak hooked a high ball back towards his own goal from inside the Senegal half and with Szczesny attempting to intercept by coming out of his penalty area, Niang knocked the ball past him before side footing into an unguarded goal. Arkadiusz Milik slotted a Łukasz Piszczek cross wide at the near post. Dawid Kownacki's headed attempt was saved late on by N'Diaye but the goalkeeper was beaten by Krychowiak's header with five minutes to go after a free kick from the right.

Cionek became the first Polish player to score an own goal in a World Cup match. Cionek's own goal was only the second time an African nation has benefited from an own goal in a World Cup match, after Andoni Zubizarreta for Spain against Nigeria in 1998. Senegal continued their impressive undefeated run in an opening World Cup match, having beaten France 1–0 in 2002.

19 June 2018
18:00 MSK (UTC+3)

Poland	1–2	Senegal
Krychowiak 86'		Cionek 37' (o.g.); Niang 60'

Otkritie Arena, Moscow
Attendance: 44,190
Referee: Nawaf Shukralla (Bahrain)

Poland	Senegal

GK	1	Wojciech Szczęsny
RB	20	Łukasz Piszczek		(substituted off) 83'
CB	4	Thiago Cionek
CB	2	Michał Pazdan
LB	13	Maciej Rybus
CM	10	Grzegorz Krychowiak	(yellow card) 12'
CM	19	Piotr Zieliński
RW	16	Jakub Błaszczykowski		(substituted off) 46'
AM	7	Arkadiusz Milik		(substituted off) 73'
LW	11	Kamil Grosicki
CF	9	Robert Lewandowski (c)
Substitutions:
DF	5	Jan Bednarek		(substituted on) 46'
FW	23	Dawid Kownacki		(substituted on) 73'
DF	18	Bartosz Bereszyński		(substituted on) 83'
Manager:
Adam Nawałka

GK	16	Khadim N'Diaye
RB	22	Moussa Wagué
CB	3	Kalidou Koulibaly
CB	6	Salif Sané	(yellow card) 49'
LB	12	Youssouf Sabaly
RM	10	Sadio Mané (c)
CM	13	Alfred N'Diaye		(substituted off) 87'
CM	5	Idrissa Gueye	(yellow card) 72'
LM	18	Ismaïla Sarr
CF	9	Mame Biram Diouf		(substituted off) 62'
CF	19	M'Baye Niang		(substituted off) 75'
Substitutions:
MF	11	Cheikh N'Doye		(substituted on) 62'
FW	14	Moussa Konaté		(substituted on) 75'
MF	8	Cheikhou Kouyaté		(substituted on) 87'
Manager:
Aliou Cissé

Man of the Match:
M'Baye Niang (Senegal)

Assistant referees:
Yaser Tulefat (Bahrain)
Taleb Al Maari (Qatar)
Fourth official:
Abdulrahman Al-Jassim (Qatar)
Reserve assistant referee:
Mohamed Al Hammadi (United Arab Emirates)
Video assistant referee:
Artur Soares Dias (Portugal)
Assistant video assistant referees:
Tiago Martins (Portugal)
Hernán Maidana (Argentina)
Wilton Sampaio (Brazil)

=== Japan vs Senegal ===
The two teams had faced each other three times, most recently in a friendly in 2003, won by Senegal 1–0.

Senegal took the lead in the 11th minute when Japanese goalkeeper Eiji Kawashima spilled a Youssouf Sabaly shot into the path of Sadio Mané, who hit the ball in from close range. Japan responded in the 34th minute when Yuto Nagatomo received a ball over the top and sent it to Takashi Inui, who curled a shot into the bottom corner past the Senegalese defenders. Yuya Osako missed a close chance in front of the Senegal net and Inui's shot struck the crossbar, before Senegal retook the lead in the 71st minute, when Moussa Wagué finished a low Sabaly cross into the top corner. Japan equalised again just seven minutes later, when Senegal goalkeeper Khadim N'Diaye failed to collect an Osako cross, leading to Inui sending the ball to Japanese substitute Keisuke Honda, who finished at the near post.

Wagué became the youngest African goalscorer at a World Cup, at the age of 19 years and 268 days. With his goal, Honda became the first Japanese player to score at three different World Cups, as well as the top scoring Asian player in World Cup history with four goals. Japan equalled their best points tally of four after two group games at a World Cup, just as they did as co-hosts in 2002.

24 June 2018
20:00 YEKT (UTC+5)

Japan	2–2	Senegal
Inui 34'; Honda 78'		Mané 11'; Wagué 71'

Central Stadium, Yekaterinburg
Attendance: 32,572
Referee: Gianluca Rocchi (Italy)

Japan	Senegal

GK	1	Eiji Kawashima
RB	19	Hiroki Sakai
CB	22	Maya Yoshida
CB	3	Gen Shoji
LB	5	Yuto Nagatomo
CM	17	Makoto Hasebe (c)	(yellow card) 90+4'
CM	7	Gaku Shibasaki
RW	8	Genki Haraguchi		(substituted off) 75'
AM	10	Shinji Kagawa		(substituted off) 72'
LW	14	Takashi Inui	(yellow card) 68'	(substituted off) 87'
CF	15	Yuya Osako
Substitutions:
MF	4	Keisuke Honda		(substituted on) 72'
FW	9	Shinji Okazaki		(substituted on) 75'
MF	11	Takashi Usami		(substituted on) 87'
Manager:
Akira Nishino

GK	16	Khadim N'Diaye
RB	12	Youssouf Sabaly	(yellow card) 90'
CB	3	Kalidou Koulibaly
CB	6	Salif Sané
LB	22	Moussa Wagué
CM	17	Badou Ndiaye		(substituted off) 81'
CM	13	Alfred N'Diaye		(substituted off) 65'
CM	5	Idrissa Gueye
RF	18	Ismaïla Sarr
CF	19	M'Baye Niang	(yellow card) 59'	(substituted off) 86'
LF	10	Sadio Mané (c)
Substitutions:
MF	8	Cheikhou Kouyaté		(substituted on) 65'
MF	11	Cheikh N'Doye	(yellow card) 90+1'	(substituted on) 81'
FW	9	Mame Biram Diouf		(substituted on) 86'
Manager:
Aliou Cissé

Man of the Match:
Sadio Mané (Senegal)

Assistant referees:
Elenito Di Liberatore (Italy)
Mauro Tonolini (Italy)
Fourth official:
Abdulrahman Al-Jassim (Qatar)
Reserve assistant referee:
Taleb Al Maari (Qatar)
Video assistant referee:
Massimiliano Irrati (Italy)
Assistant video assistant referees:
Tiago Martins (Portugal)
Hernán Maidana (Argentina)
Paolo Valeri (Italy)

=== Poland vs Colombia ===
The two teams had met in five matches, most recently in a 2006 friendly, won by Colombia 2–1.

Abel Aguilar was taken from the field on a stretcher in the 32nd minute and was replaced by Mateus Uribe. Shortly after, a cross by James Rodríguez from the right was met by the head of Yerry Mina, who lost his marker to head over Wojciech Szczęsny's outstretched arms and into the net. Juan Fernando Quintero fired wide from 25 yards at the start of the second half. Juan Cuadrado then squared to Radamel Falcao on the edge of the box who lifted his shot well over the crossbar. In the 58th minute, Robert Lewandowski controlled a long pass only to shoot straight into David Ospina's midriff as Poland attempted their first shot on target of the game. Quintero's slide-rule pass presented Falcao with a one-on-one situation and he guided the ball past Szczęsny with the outside of his right foot to double his side's lead. With 15 minutes left on the clock, James' pass from the left found Cuadrado in space through the middle and he took a touch before finishing it into the bottom-right corner of the net.

Poland were the first European nation to be eliminated from the 2018 World Cup. Including Colombia's victory against Poland, there were 14 World Cup goals scored on 24 June 2018 - the most on a single day of action in the competition (maximum 3 games) since 10 June 1990 (also 14).

24 June 2018
21:00 MSK (UTC+3)

Poland	0–3	Colombia
		Mina 40'; Falcao 70'; Ju. Cuadrado 75'

Kazan Arena, Kazan
Attendance: 42,873
Referee: César Arturo Ramos (Mexico)

Poland	Colombia

GK	1	Wojciech Szczęsny
CB	20	Łukasz Piszczek
CB	5	Jan Bednarek	(yellow card) 61'
CB	2	Michał Pazdan		(substituted off) 80'
RM	18	Bartosz Bereszyński		(substituted off) 72'
CM	10	Grzegorz Krychowiak
CM	6	Jacek Góralski	(yellow card) 85'
LM	13	Maciej Rybus
RF	19	Piotr Zieliński
CF	9	Robert Lewandowski (c)
LF	23	Dawid Kownacki		(substituted off) 57'
Substitutions:
MF	11	Kamil Grosicki		(substituted on) 57'
FW	14	Łukasz Teodorczyk		(substituted on) 72'
DF	15	Kamil Glik		(substituted on) 80'
Manager:
Adam Nawałka

GK	1	David Ospina
RB	4	Santiago Arias
CB	23	Davinson Sánchez
CB	13	Yerry Mina
LB	17	Johan Mojica
CM	8	Abel Aguilar	(substituted off) 32'
CM	5	Wílmar Barrios
RW	11	Juan Cuadrado
AM	20	Juan Fernando Quintero	(substituted off) 73'
LW	10	James Rodríguez
CF	9	Radamel Falcao (c)	(substituted off) 78'
Substitutions:
MF	15	Mateus Uribe	(substituted on) 32'
MF	16	Jefferson Lerma	(substituted on) 73'
FW	7	Carlos Bacca	(substituted on) 78'
Manager:
(Argentina) José Pékerman

Man of the Match:
James Rodríguez (Colombia)

Assistant referees:
Marvin Torrentera (Mexico)
Miguel Hernández (Mexico)
Fourth official:
Julio Bascuñán (Chile)
Reserve assistant referee:
Christian Schiemann (Chile)
Video assistant referee:
Mauro Vigliano (Argentina)
Assistant video assistant referees:
Gery Vargas (Bolivia)
Roberto Díaz Pérez (Spain)
Daniele Orsato (Italy)

=== Japan vs Poland ===
The two teams had met twice, most recently in a friendly game in 2002, won by Japan 2–0.

Yoshinori Muto's drive forced Łukasz Fabiański to parry, before the goalkeeper smothered a Gōtoku Sakai effort. Eiji Kawashima scooped Kamil Grosicki's header clear. With just over half an hour remaining, Rafał Kurzawa's free-kick from the left picked out Jan Bednarek, who volleyed it into the net from six yards out. Maya Yoshida headed well wide from a left-wing corner. Robert Lewandowski steered Grosicki's pin-point pass over the top.

Poland beat Japan for the first time in an official match, having defeated Japan in four unofficial matches. Poland won each of their 14 games in which they scored first in World Cup finals. Poland kept a clean sheet at the World Cup for the first time since winning 1–0 against Portugal in 1986. On another side, since the new millennium, Poland had repeated their poor performances in 2002 and 2006 World Cups, eliminated after losing two opening matches before grabbing a late victory in the final match.

There was some criticism of the final minutes in the game, as both sides appeared to settle for the 1–0 scoreline.

28 June 2018
17:00 MSK (UTC+3)

Japan	0–1	Poland
		Bednarek 59'

Volgograd Arena, Volgograd
Attendance: 42,189
Referee: Janny Sikazwe (Zambia)

Japan	Poland

GK	1	Eiji Kawashima (c)
RB	19	Hiroki Sakai
CB	22	Maya Yoshida
CB	20	Tomoaki Makino	(yellow card) 66'
LB	5	Yuto Nagatomo
CM	16	Hotaru Yamaguchi
CM	7	Gaku Shibasaki
RW	21	Gōtoku Sakai
AM	9	Shinji Okazaki		(substituted off) 47'
LW	11	Takashi Usami		(substituted off) 65'
CF	13	Yoshinori Muto		(substituted off) 82'
Substitutions:
FW	15	Yuya Osako		(substituted on) 47'
MF	14	Takashi Inui		(substituted on) 65'
MF	17	Makoto Hasebe		(substituted on) 82'
Manager:
Akira Nishino

GK	22	Łukasz Fabiański
CB	18	Bartosz Bereszyński
CB	15	Kamil Glik
CB	5	Jan Bednarek
RM	21	Rafał Kurzawa	(substituted off) 79'
CM	10	Grzegorz Krychowiak
CM	6	Jacek Góralski
LM	3	Artur Jędrzejczyk
RF	19	Piotr Zieliński	(substituted off) 79'
CF	9	Robert Lewandowski (c)
LF	11	Kamil Grosicki
Substitutions:
FW	14	Łukasz Teodorczyk	(substituted on) 79'
MF	17	Sławomir Peszko	(substituted on) 79'
Manager:
Adam Nawałka

Man of the Match:
Jan Bednarek (Poland)

Assistant referees:
Jerson Dos Santos (Angola)
Zakhele Siwela (South Africa)
Fourth official:
Ricardo Montero (Costa Rica)
Reserve assistant referee:
Juan Carlos Mora (Costa Rica)
Video assistant referee:
Daniele Orsato (Italy)
Assistant video assistant referees:
Gery Vargas (Bolivia)
Carlos Astroza (Chile)
Paolo Valeri (Italy)

=== Senegal vs Colombia ===
The two teams had met only once, a 2014 friendly game which ended in a 2–2 draw.

The referee awarded Senegal a penalty in the 17th minute. After consulting VAR, he judged that defender Davinson Sánchez had won the ball before making any contact with Sadio Mané. After half an hour, James Rodríguez was substituted with what appeared to be a recurrence of the injury that kept him out of Colombia's 2–1 loss to Japan. Mané took a free-kick in the 64th minute which he shot off-target. Kalidou Koulibaly got a touch on a Luis Muriel drive to deflect the ball narrowly wide. And in the 74th minute Colombia scored the decisive goal of the game, Juan Quintero's corner from the right found Yerry Mina who rose and crashed home a header that went through goalkeeper Khadim N'Diaye.

With Senegal being the last African team to be knocked out of Russia 2018, there were no teams from Africa in the round of 16 for the first time since the stage was introduced in 1986. Colombia were the only team to reach the knockout stage despite losing their opening match of the tournament. Senegal became the third team to be eliminated despite winning their opening game of the tournament (also Iran and Serbia); and even moreover, this was the first time Senegal got eliminated from the group stage, despite owning a huge advantage prior to the match against Colombia. The last time as many as three teams failed to get through the group stage despite winning their opener was in 2002 (Argentina, Costa Rica, and Russia).

28 June 2018
18:00 SAMT (UTC+4)

Senegal	0–1	Colombia
		Mina 74'

Cosmos Arena, Samara
Attendance: 41,970
Referee: Milorad Mažić (Serbia)

Senegal	Colombia

GK	16	Khadim N'Diaye
RB	21	Lamine Gassama
CB	6	Salif Sané
CB	3	Kalidou Koulibaly
LB	12	Youssouf Sabaly		(substituted off) 74'
RM	18	Ismaïla Sarr
CM	8	Cheikhou Kouyaté (c)
CM	5	Idrissa Gueye
LM	10	Sadio Mané
CF	20	Keita Baldé		(substituted off) 80'
CF	19	M'Baye Niang	(yellow card) 51'	(substituted off) 86'
Substitutions:
DF	22	Moussa Wagué		(substituted on) 74'
FW	14	Moussa Konaté		(substituted on) 80'
FW	15	Diafra Sakho		(substituted on) 86'
Manager:
Aliou Cissé

GK	1	David Ospina
RB	4	Santiago Arias
CB	23	Davinson Sánchez
CB	13	Yerry Mina
LB	17	Johan Mojica	(yellow card) 45'
CM	15	Mateus Uribe		(substituted off) 83'
CM	6	Carlos Sánchez
RW	11	Juan Cuadrado
AM	20	Juan Fernando Quintero
LW	10	James Rodríguez		(substituted off) 31'
CF	9	Radamel Falcao (c)		(substituted off) 89'
Substitutions:
FW	14	Luis Muriel		(substituted on) 31'
MF	16	Jefferson Lerma		(substituted on) 83'
FW	19	Miguel Borja		(substituted on) 89'
Manager:
(Argentina) José Pékerman

Man of the Match:
Yerry Mina (Colombia)

Assistant referees:
Milovan Ristić (Serbia)
Dalibor Đurđević (Serbia)
Fourth official:
Bamlak Tessema Weyesa (Ethiopia)
Reserve assistant referee:
Hasan Al Mahri (United Arab Emirates)
Video assistant referee:
Danny Makkelie (Netherlands)
Assistant video assistant referees:
Bastian Dankert (Germany)
Elenito Di Liberatore (Italy)
Gianluca Rocchi (Italy)

== Discipline ==
Fair play points were used as tiebreakers because the overall and head-to-head records of two teams were tied. These were calculated based on yellow and red cards received in all group matches as follows:

- first yellow card: minus 1 point;
- indirect red card (second yellow card): minus 3 points;
- direct red card: minus 4 points;
- yellow card and direct red card: minus 5 points;

Only one of the above deductions were applied to a player in a single match.

Team	Match 1				Match 2				Match 3				Points
Team	Yellow card	(yellow card) (yellow-red card)	Red card	(yellow card) (red card)	Yellow card	(yellow card) (yellow-red card)	Red card	(yellow card) (red card)	Yellow card	(yellow card) (yellow-red card)	Red card	(yellow card) (red card)	Points
Poland	1				2								−3
Japan	1				2				1				−4
Senegal	2				3				1				−6
Colombia	2		1						1				−7

== See also ==
- Colombia at the FIFA World Cup
- Japan at the FIFA World Cup
- Poland at the FIFA World Cup
- Senegal at the FIFA World Cup
