= AS Biton =

Malian football club

- Full name: AS Biton
- Founded: 1979
- Ground: Stade Amari Daou; Ségou, Mali
- Capacity: 30,000
- League: Malian Second Division

AS Biton is a Malian football club based in Ségou. They play in the Malian Second Division, with their last appearance in the Premiere Division coming in the 2006/07 season. Their home stadium is Stade Amari Daou.
