= Yves Yuvuladio =

Congolese footballer (born 1978)

Yvos Yuvuladio
Personal information
- Full name: Yvos Kitutele Yuvuladio
- Date of birth: 5 March 1978 (age 48)
- Place of birth: Kinshasa, Zaire
- Height: 1.70 m (5 ft 7 in)
- Position: Defender

Youth career
- 1988-1991: Tigre Sport
- 1990-1991: Africa Sport

Senior career*
Years	Team	Apps	(Gls)
1991-1996	AS Bilima		
1996-1998	Şekerspor	28	(2)
1998–2000	Motema Pembe		
2001–2002	Erzurumspor	25	(2)
2002–2003	Motema Pembe		
2003–2004	Espérance Sportive de Tunis		
2004–2006	Hapoel Haifa		
2006–2007	Ironi Kiryat Shmona	26	(1)
2007–2008	Hapoel Petah Tikva	25	(0)
2008–2009	Hapoel Bnei Lod	18	(1)

International career
1992–2002	DR Congo	13	(1)
- * Club domestic league appearances and goals

Yves Yuvuladio (born 5 March 1978) is a Congolese retired professional footballer who played as a defender. He was a member of the DR Congo squad for the 2000 and 2002 Africa Cup of Nations.

== Early life ==
Yvos, was born into a family of 7 childs.
