= Stade Babemba Traoré =

Sports venue in Sikasso, Mali

Coordinates: 11°18′49″N 5°41′58″W

- Interactive map of Stade Babemba Traoré
- Location: Sikasso, Mali
- Capacity: 15,000
- Surface: Grass

Construction
- Built: 2001
- Opened: 2002

Tenant
- Stade Malien de Sikasso

Stade Babemba Traoré is a multi-use stadium in Sikasso, Mali. It is currently used mostly for football matches. It serves as a home ground of Stade Malien de Sikasso. It also hosted some matches for the 2002 African Cup of Nations. The stadium holds 15,000 people and was opened in 2001.
