= 2002 African Cup of Nations =

23rd edition of the Africa Cup of Nations

Coupe d'Afrique des Nations 2002
- African Cup of Nations 2002 official logo

Tournament details
- Host country: Mali
- Dates: 19 January – 10 February
- Teams: 16
- Venues: 6 (in 5 host cities)

Final positions
- Champions: Cameroon (4th title)
- Runners-up: Senegal
- Third place: Nigeria
- Fourth place: Mali

Tournament statistics
- Matches played: 32
- Goals scored: 48 (1.5 per match)
- Attendance: 570,000 (17,813 per match)
- Top scorer(s): (Nigeria) Julius Aghahowa (Cameroon) Patrick Mboma (Cameroon) Salomon Olembé (3 goals each)
- Best player: (Senegal) El Hadji Diouf

The 2002 African Cup of Nations was the 23rd edition of the Africa Cup of Nations, the association football championship of Africa (CAF). It was hosted by Mali. Just like in 2000, the field of sixteen teams was split into four groups of four. Cameroon won its fourth championship (repeating as champions), beating Senegal on penalties 3–2 after a goalless draw in the final.

== Host selection ==
Bids:

- Algeria
- Botswana
- Egypt
- Ethiopia
- Mali (selected as hosts)

The organization of the 2002 Africa Cup of Nations was awarded to Mali on 5 February 1998 by the CAF Executive Committee meeting in Ouagadougou, Burkina Faso during the 1998 African Cup of Nations. Voters had a choice between five countries: Algeria, Botswana, Egypt, Ethiopia and Mali.

This was the first time that Mali had hosted the competition.

== Qualified teams ==
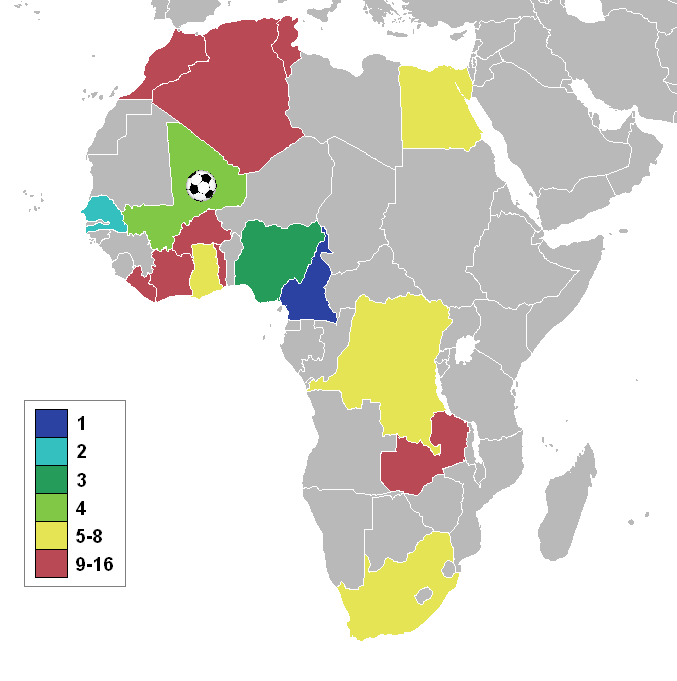
Participating countries

Team	Qualified as	Qualified on	Previous appearances in tournament (Note: Bold indicates champion for that year, Italic indicates host.)
Mali	Hosts		2 (1972, 1994)
Cameroon	Holders	13 February 2000	11 (1970, 1972, 1982, **1984**, 1986, **1988**, 1990, 1992, 1996, 1998, **2000**)
Liberia	Group 2 winners	16 June 2001	1 (1996)
Morocco	Group 3 winners	16 June 2001	9 (1972, **1976**, 1978, 1980, 1986, 1988, 1992, 1998, 2000)
Nigeria	Group 1 winners	16 June 2001	11 (1963, 1976, 1978, **1980**, 1982, 1984, 1988, 1990, 1992, **1994**, 2000)
Algeria	Group 4 winners	17 June 2001	11 (1968, 1980, 1982, 1984, 1986, 1988, **1990**, 1992, 1996, 1998, 2000)
Burkina Faso	Group 4 runners-up	17 June 2001	4 (1978, 1996, 1998, 2000)
DR Congo	Group 6 runners-up	17 June 2001	12 (1965, **1968**, 1970, 1972, **1974**, 1976, 1988, 1992, 1994, 1996, 1998, 2000)
Egypt	Group 7 winners	17 June 2001	17 (**1957**, **1959**, 1962, 1963, 1970, 1974, 1976, 1980, 1984, **1986**, 1988, 1990, 1992, 1994, 1996, **1998**, 2000)
Ghana	Group 6 winners	17 June 2001	13 (**1963**, **1965**, 1968, 1970, **1978**, 1980, **1982**, 1984, 1992, 1994, 1996, 1998, 2000)
Ivory Coast	Group 7 runners-up	17 June 2001	14 (1965, 1968, 1970, 1974, 1980, 1984, 1986, 1988, 1990, **1992**, 1994, 1996, 1998, 2000)
Senegal	Group 5 winners	17 June 2001	7 (1965, 1968, 1986, 1990, 1992, 1994, 2000)
South Africa	Group 2 runners-up	17 June 2001	3 (**1996**, 1998, 2000)
Togo	Group 5 winners	17 June 2001	4 (1972, 1984, 1998, 2000)
Tunisia	Group 3 runners-up	17 June 2001	9 (1962, 1963, 1965, 1978, 1982, 1994, 1996, 1998, 2000)
Zambia	Group 1 runners-up	16 June 2001	10 (1974, 1978, 1982, 1986, 1990, 1992, 1994, 1996, 1998, 2000)

== Venues ==
2002 African Cup of Nations is located in Mali			Bamako
2002 African Cup of Nations is located in Mali			Stade du 26 Mars
2002 African Cup of Nations is located in Mali			Capacity: 55,000
2002 African Cup of Nations is located in Mali			Bamako
2002 African Cup of Nations is located in Mali			Stade Modibo Keïta
2002 African Cup of Nations is located in Mali			Capacity: 25,000
Kayes	Mopti	Ségou	Sikasso
Stade Abdoulaye Makoro Cissoko	Stade Barema Bocoum	Stade Amary Daou	Stade Babemba Traoré
Capacity: 15,000	Capacity: 15,000	Capacity: 15,000	Capacity: 15,000

== Group stage ==
=== Group A ===
Pos	Team	Pld	W	D	L	GF	GA	GD	Pts	Qualification
1	Nigeria	3	2	1	0	2	0	+2	7	Advance to knockout stage
2	Mali (H)	3	1	2	0	3	1	+2	5	Advance to knockout stage
3	Liberia	3	0	2	1	3	4	−1	2	
4	Algeria	3	0	1	2	2	5	−3	1	

Source: CAF
(H) Hosts
19 January 2002
16:00

Mali	1–1	Liberia
Keita 87'		Weah 45'

Stade du 26 Mars, Bamako
Attendance: 50,000
Referee: Abdel Hakim Shelmani (Libya)
21 January 2002
16:00

Algeria	0–1	Nigeria
		Aghahowa 43'

Stade du 26 Mars, Bamako
Attendance: 10,000
Referee: Felix Tangawarima (Zimbabwe)

24 January 2002
19:00

Mali	0–0	Nigeria

Stade du 26 Mars, Bamako
Attendance: 50,000
Referee: Alex Quartey (Ghana)
25 January 2002
19:30

Liberia	2–2	Algeria
Daye 7'; K. Sebwe 72'		Akrour 45'; Kraouche 90+1'

Stade du 26 Mars, Bamako
Attendance: 4,000
Referee: Evehe Divine (Cameroon)

28 January 2002
18:00

Mali	2–0	Algeria
Bagayoko 18'; Touré 24'

Stade du 26 Mars, Bamako
Attendance: 50,000
Referee: Lim Kee Chong (Mauritius)
28 January 2002
18:00

Liberia	0–1	Nigeria
		Aghahowa 63'

Stade Barema Bocoum, Mopti
Attendance: 9,000
Referee: Falla Ndoye (Senegal)

=== Group B ===
Pos	Team	Pld	W	D	L	GF	GA	GD	Pts	Qualification
1	South Africa	3	1	2	0	3	1	+2	5	Advance to knockout stage
2	Ghana	3	1	2	0	2	1	+1	5	Advance to knockout stage
3	Morocco	3	1	1	1	3	4	−1	4	
4	Burkina Faso	3	0	1	2	2	4	−2	1	

Source: CAF
20 January 2002
19:30

South Africa	0–0	Burkina Faso

Stade Amare Daou, Ségou
Attendance: 12,000
Referee: Falla Ndoye (Senegal)
21 January 2002
16:00

Morocco	0–0	Ghana

Stade Amare Daou, Ségou
Attendance: 4,000
Referee: Domenico Messina (Italy)

24 January 2002
16:00

South Africa	0–0	Ghana

Stade Amare Daou, Ségou
Attendance: 5,000
Referee: Mourad Daami (Tunisia)
26 January 2002
15:30

Burkina Faso	1–2	Morocco
Dagano 58'		Zerouali 23', 85'

Stade Amare Daou, Ségou
Attendance: 6,000
Referee: Lim Kee Chong (Mauritius)

30 January 2002
16:00

South Africa	3–1	Morocco
Zuma 42'; Mngomeni 48'; Nomvethe 51'		Benmahmoud 77' (pen.)

Stade Amare Daou, Ségou
Attendance: 3,000
Referee: Gamal Al-Ghandour (Egypt)
30 January 2002
16:00

Burkina Faso	1–2	Ghana
A. Touré 81'		Boakye 90', 90+2'

Stade Barema Bocoum, Mopti
Attendance: 15,000
Referee: Chukwudi Chukwujekwu (Nigeria)

=== Group C ===
Pos	Team	Pld	W	D	L	GF	GA	GD	Pts	Qualification
1	Cameroon	3	3	0	0	5	0	+5	9	Advance to knockout stage
2	DR Congo	3	1	1	1	3	2	+1	4	Advance to knockout stage
3	Togo	3	0	2	1	0	3	−3	2	
4	Ivory Coast	3	0	1	2	1	4	−3	1	

Source: CAF
20 January 2002
17:30

Cameroon	1–0	DR Congo
Mboma 40'

Stade Babemba Traoré, Sikasso
Attendance: 15,000
Referee: Coffi Codjia (Benin)
21 January 2002
18:00

Togo	0–0	Ivory Coast

Stade Babemba Traoré, Sikasso
Attendance: 15,000
Referee: Chukwudi Chukwujekwu (Nigeria)

25 January 2002
17:30

Cameroon	1–0	Ivory Coast
Mboma 85'

Stade Babemba Traoré, Sikasso
Attendance: 15,000
Referee: Gamal Al-Ghandour (Egypt)
26 January 2002
17:30

DR Congo	0–0	Togo

Stade Babemba Traoré, Sikasso
Attendance: 7,000
Referee: Hailemalak Tessema (Ethiopia)

29 January 2002
16:00

Cameroon	3–0	Togo
Mettomo 52'; Eto'o 80'; Olembé 89'

Stade Babemba Traoré, Sikasso
Attendance: 6,000
Referee: Petros Mathabela (South Africa)
29 January 2002
16:00

DR Congo	3–1	Ivory Coast
Yuvuladio 28'; Nonda 66'; Kimoto 81' (pen.)		Traoré 86'

Stade Abdoulaye Makoro Cissoko, Kayes
Attendance: 12,000
Referee: Felix Tangawarima (Zimbabwe)

=== Group D ===
Pos	Team	Pld	W	D	L	GF	GA	GD	Pts	Qualification
1	Senegal	3	2	1	0	2	0	+2	7	Advance to knockout stage
2	Egypt	3	2	0	1	3	2	+1	6	Advance to knockout stage
3	Tunisia	3	0	2	1	0	1	−1	2	
4	Zambia	3	0	1	2	1	3	−2	1	

Source: CAF
20 January 2002
15:30

Egypt	0–1	Senegal
		Diatta 82'

Stade Modibo Kéïta, Bamako
Attendance: 20,000
Referee: Mohamed Guezzaz (Morocco)
21 January 2002
19:00

Zambia	0–0	Tunisia

Stade Modibo Kéïta, Bamako
Attendance: 6,000
Referee: Koman Coulibaly (Mali)

25 January 2002
15:30

Egypt	1–0	Tunisia
Emam 23'

Stade Modibo Kéïta, Bamako
Attendance: 3,000
Referee: Arturo Daudén Ibáñez (Spain)
26 January 2002
19:30

Senegal	1–0	Zambia
Camara 90'

Stade Modibo Kéïta, Bamako
Attendance: 20,000
Referee: Abdel Hakim Shelmani (Libya)

31 January 2002
16:00

Egypt	2–1	Zambia
Mido 35'; Emam 53'		Kampamba 89'

Stade Modibo Kéïta, Bamako
Attendance: 10,000
Referee: Coffi Codjia (Benin)
31 January 2002
16:00

Senegal	0–0	Tunisia

Stade Abdoulaye Nakoro Cissoko, Kayes
Attendance: 8,000
Referee: Domenico Messina (Italy)

== Knockout stage ==
Quarter-finals
3 February – Bamako
Nigeria	1
Ghana	0
4 February – Bamako
Senegal	2
DR Congo	0
3 February – Kayes
South Africa	0
Mali	2
4 February – Sikasso
Cameroon	1
Egypt	0

Semi-finals
7 February – Bamako
Nigeria	1
Senegal (a.e.t.)	2
7 February – Bamako
Mali	0
Cameroon	3

Final
10 February – Bamako
Senegal	0 (2)
Cameroon (p)	0 (3)
Third place
9 February – Mopti
Nigeria	1
Mali	0

=== Quarter-finals ===
3 February 2002
16:00

South Africa	0–2	Mali
		Touré 60'; Dr. Coulibaly 90+2'

Stade Abdoulaye Nakoro Cissoko, Kayes
Attendance: 15,000
Referee: Arturo Daudén Ibáñez (Spain)

3 February 2002
19:00

Nigeria	1–0	Ghana
Lawal 80'

Stade du 26 Mars, Bamako
Attendance: 25,000
Referee: Mohamed Guezzaz (Morocco)

4 February 2002
16:00

Cameroon	1–0	Egypt
Mboma 62'

Stade Babemba Traoré, Sikasso
Attendance: 15,000
Referee: Mourad Daami (Tunisia)

4 February 2002
19:00

Senegal	2–0	DR Congo
Diao 30'; Diouf 86'

Stade Modibo Keïta, Bamako
Attendance: 25,000
Referee: Domenico Messina (Italy)

=== Semi-finals ===
7 February 2002
16:00

Nigeria	1–2 (a.e.t.)	Senegal
Aghahowa 88'		Bouba Diop 54'; Diao 97'

Stade Modibo Keïta, Bamako
Attendance: 20,000
Referee: Coffi Codjia (Benin)

7 February 2002
19:00

Mali	0–3	Cameroon
		Olembé 39', 45+1'; Foé 84'

Stade du 26 Mars, Bamako
Attendance: 55,000
Referee: Lim Kee Chong (Mauritius)

=== Third place match ===
9 February 2002
16:00

Nigeria	1–0	Mali
Yakubu 29'

Stade Barema Bocoum, Mopti
Attendance: 15,000
Referee: Abdel Hakim Shelmani (Libya)

=== Final ===
10 February 2002
16:00

Senegal	0–0 (a.e.t.)	Cameroon
Penalties
Coly (penalty scored); Fadiga (penalty scored); Faye (penalty missed); Diouf (penalty missed); Cissé (penalty missed)	2–3	(penalty missed) Wome; (penalty scored) Suffo; (penalty scored) Lauren; (penalty scored) Geremi; (penalty missed) Song

Stade du 26 Mars, Bamako
Attendance: 50,000
Referee: Gamal Al-Ghandour (Egypt)

== Goalscorers ==
There were 48 goals scored in 32 matches, for an average of 1.5 goals per match.

3 goals

- (Cameroon) Patrick Mboma
- (Cameroon) Salomon Olembé
- (Nigeria) Julius Aghahowa

2 goals

- (Egypt) Hazem Emam
- (Ghana) Isaac Boakye
- (Mali) Bassala Touré
- (Morocco) Hicham Zerouali
- (Senegal) Salif Diao

1 goal

- (Algeria) Nassim Akrour
- (Algeria) Nasreddine Kraouche
- (Burkina Faso) Moumouni Dagano
- (Burkina Faso) Amadou Touré
- (Cameroon) Samuel Eto'o
- (Cameroon) Lucien Mettomo
- (Cameroon) Marc-Vivien Foé
- (Democratic Republic of the Congo) Papi Kimoto
- (Democratic Republic of the Congo) Shabani Nonda
- (Democratic Republic of the Congo) Yves Yuvuladio
- (Egypt) Mido
- (Ivory Coast) Kandia Traoré
- (Liberia) Prince Akim Daye
- (Liberia) Kelvin Sebwe
- (Liberia) George Weah
- (Mali) Mamadou Bagayoko
- (Mali) Dramane Coulibaly
- (Mali) Seydou Keita
- (Morocco) Rachid Benmahmoud
- (Nigeria) Yakubu
- (Nigeria) Garba Lawal
- (Senegal) Souleymane Camara
- (Senegal) Lamine Diatta
- (Senegal) Papa Bouba Diop
- (Senegal) El Hadji Diouf
- (South Africa) Thabo Mngomeni
- (South Africa) Siyabonga Nomvete
- (South Africa) Sibusiso Zuma
- (Zambia) Gift Kampamba

== CAF Team of the Tournament ==
Goalkeeper

- (Senegal) Tony Sylva

Defenders

- (Nigeria) Taribo West
- (Cameroon) Rigobert Song
- (Egypt) Hany Ramzy

Midfielders

- (Mali) Seydou Keita
- (Algeria) Rafik Saifi
- (Cameroon) Patrick Mboma
- (Nigeria) Ifeanyi Udeze
- (South Africa) Sibusiso Zuma

Forwards

- (Nigeria) Julius Aghahowa
- (Senegal) El Hadji Diouf
