= Stade Amary Daou =

Stadium in Ségou, Mali

Coordinates: 13°25′15″N 6°17′30″W

- Interactive map of Stade Amary Daou
- Location: Ségou, Mali
- Capacity: 30,000
- Surface: Grass

Construction
- Built: 2001
- Opened: 2002

Tenant
- AS Biton

Stade Amary Daou is a multi-use stadium in Ségou, Mali. It has a capacity of 30,000 and it opened in 2001. The venue is currently used mostly for football matches and it is the home of AS Biton. It also hosted matches for the 2002 African Cup of Nations.
