= Stade Baréma Bocoum =

Sports venue in Mopti, Mali

Coordinates: 14°28′54″N 4°11′3″W

- Interactive map of Stade Baréma Bocoum
- Location: Taïkiri quarter Mopti, Mali
- Capacity: 15,000
- Surface: Grass

Construction
- Built: 2001
- Opened: 2002

Tenant
- Débo Club

Stade Baréma Bocoum is a multi-use stadium in Mopti, Mali. It is currently used mostly for football matches. It serves as a home ground of Débo Club. It also hosted some matches for the 2002 African Cup of Nations. The stadium holds 15,000 people and was opened in 2001. It is named after a former foreign minister Baréma Bocoum.
