= AS Sigui =

Malian football club

- Full name: Association Sportive de Sigui
- Ground: Stade Abdoulaye Nakoro Cissoko; Kayes, Mali
- Capacity: 15,000
- League: Malien Second Division

AS Sigui is a Malian football club based in Kayes. At the end of the 2006/7 season, they were relegated from the Malien Premiere Division to the D1 (second division) in Malian football. Their home stadium is Stade Abdoulaye Nakoro Cissoko.

== Achievements ==
- Malien Cup: 1

1987

== Performance in CAF competitions ==
- CAF Cup: 1 appearance

1993 – Second Round

- CAF Cup Winners' Cup: 1 appearance

1988 – Preliminary Round
