= Baréma Bocoum =

Malian politician and diplomat

Minister of the Interior
- In office 1964–1966
- President: Modibo Keïta
- Prime Minister: Modibo Keïta

Minister of Foreign Affairs
- In office 1961–1964
- President: Modibo Keïta
- Prime Minister: Modibo Keïta
- Preceded by: Modibo Keïta
- Succeeded by: Ousmane Ba

Personal details
- Born: January 1, 1914 Mopti, French Sudan
- Died: March 3, 1973 (aged 59) Bamako, Mali
- Party: US-RDA

Baréma Bocoum (1 January 1914 – 3 March 1973) was a Malian politician and diplomat.

== Biography ==
Bocoum graduated from the École normale supérieure William Ponty in 1936. He held a number of political and administrative positions prior to and after Mali's independence from France in 1960, including as municipal counselor for Bamako in 1953, territorial counselor for Mopti from 1954 to 1957, and municipal counselor and mayor of Mopti from 1956 until 1968. Simultaneously, Bocoum served as a deputy for French Sudan in the National Assembly of France from 1956 to 1958, where he represented the Democratic and Socialist Union of the Resistance. He then served as a member of the Senate for the French Community from 1959 until 1961.

After Mali gained independence from France in 1960, Bocoum was elected to the country's National Assembly, representing the Sudanese Union – African Democratic Rally (US-RDA). He served as Minister of Foreign Affairs from 1961 to 1964, and as Minister of the Interior from 1964 until 1966. Initially an ally of President Modibo Keïta, he was criticized as bourgeois and an anti-socialist by the latter in 1967, and removed from his political offices early the following year.

Stade Baréma Bocoum in Mopti is named after him.

== Honours and awards ==
- (Czechoslovakia) Grand Cross of the Order of the White Lion (5 June 1962)

Preceded by Modibo Keita	Foreign Minister of Mali; 1961-1964	Succeeded by Ousmane Ba
