= Khadim N'Diaye =

Senegalese footballer

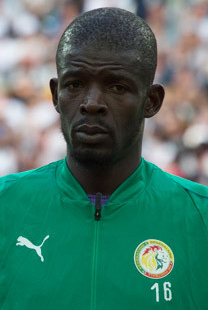
- N'Diaye lining up for Senegal at the 2018 FIFA World Cup

Personal information
- Full name: Serigne Khadim N'Diaye
- Date of birth: 5 April 1985 (age 41)
- Place of birth: Dakar, Senegal
- Height: 1.85 m (6 ft 1 in)
- Position: Goalkeeper

Youth career
- 1997–2006: Espoir Saint Louis

Senior career*
Years	Team	Apps	(Gls)
2007–2009	Casa Sport	39	(0)
2009–2012	ASC Linguère		
2012	→ Kalmar FF (loan)	0	(0)
2013	ASC Diaraf		
2014–2019	Horoya AC		
2019–2020	Génération Foot		
2020–2023	Horoya AC		

International career
2009–2018	Senegal	27	(0)
- * Club domestic league appearances and goals as of 24 March 2014

Serigne Khadim N'Diaye (born 5 April 1985) is a Senegalese former professional footballer who played as a goalkeeper.

== Club career ==
Born in Senegal's capital Dakar, N'Diaye began his career 1997 with Espoir Saint Louis and signed 2007 for Casa Sport. In two years with the club he earned 39 caps before joining Senegal Premier League rivals ASC Linguère in June 2010.

He later signed for Horoya AC. In April 2019 he broke both legs in a match, subsequently receiving a three-year contract extension with the club.

== International career ==
N'Diaye earned his first call-up for the Senegal national team in November 2009 and made his debut on 28 May 2010 against Denmark.

In May 2018 he was named in Senegal's 23-man squad for the 2018 FIFA World Cup in Russia.

== Career statistics ==
Appearances and goals by national team and year
National team	Year	Apps	Goals
Senegal	2010	6	0
Senegal	2011	2	0
Senegal	2012	1	0
Senegal	2013	2	0
Senegal	2014	0	0
Senegal	2015	1	0
Senegal	2016	4	0
Senegal	2017	6	0
Senegal	2018	5	0
Total		27	0
