= Stade Abdoulaye Makoro Cissoko =

Sports venue in Kayes, Mali

Coordinates: 14°26′7″N 11°26′24″W

- Interactive map of Stade Abdoulaye Makoro Cissoko
- Location: CHP6+43V; Kayes, Mali
- Capacity: 15,000
- Surface: Grass

Construction
- Built: 2001
- Opened: 2002

Tenant
- AS Sigui

Stade Abdoulaye Makoro Cissoko is a multi-use stadium in Kayes, Mali. It is currently used mostly for football matches. The venue serves as a home of AS Sigui. It also hosted some matches for the 2002 African Cup of Nations. The stadium has a capacity of 15,000 and it opened in 2001.
