= Khalilou Fadiga =

Senegalese footballer (born 1974)

Personal information
- Date of birth: 30 December 1974 (age 51)
- Place of birth: Dakar, Senegal
- Height: 1.88 m (6 ft 2 in)
- Position: Midfielder

Youth career
- 1989–1990: Paris Saint-Germain
- 1991–1992: Red Star
- 1992–1994: RFC Liège

Senior career*
Years	Team	Apps	(Gls)
1994–1995	RFC Liège	26	(5)
1995–1997	Lommel	48	(2)
1997–2001	Club Brugge	71	(13)
2000	→ Auxerre (loan)	21	(1)
2001–2003	Auxerre	61	(9)
2003–2004	Internazionale	0	(0)
2004–2006	Bolton Wanderers	13	(1)
2005	→ Derby County (loan)	4	(0)
2007	Coventry City	6	(0)
2008	Gent	17	(0)
2008	Germinal Beerschot	10	(0)
2011	KSV Temse	0	(0)
Total		277	(31)

International career
2000–2008	Senegal	37	(4)
- * Club domestic league appearances and goals

Khalilou Fadiga (born 30 December 1974) is a Senegalese former professional footballer who played as a midfielder.

He started his youth career at the Paris-based clubs Paris Saint Germain and Red Star before going to FC Liège in the Belgian League. He made his senior debut at FC Liège in the 1994–1995 season before playing for Lommel (KVSK United) and Club Brugge. After a loan spell with Auxerre in 2000, he signed permanently for the club in 2001.

In the summer of 2003, he was signed by Inter. At Inter, doctors discovered that he had heart problems and he never appeared for the team. He opted not to retire. After leaving Inter, he had brief stints at Bolton, Derby County, Coventry City, Gent, Germinal Beerschot and KSV Temse.

Throughout his eight year career with the Senegal national team, he earned 37 caps. He was part of the Senegal team that defeated reigning champions France in the opening fixture of the 2002 World Cup and made it to the quarter-finals. He was also part of the team that finished runner-up in the 2002 African Cup of Nations.

== Club career ==
=== Early career ===
Fadiga moved to France when he was six years old. Fadiga began his career at Paris Saint-Germain in France but failed to make an impression, and so was transferred to fellow Parisian club, Red Star, before moving to Belgian club RFC Liège.

=== Lommel ===
It was in Belgium that he found the profile that was to launch his international career. After one season he moved from FC Liège to Lommel, which is now KVSK United. He played two seasons at Lommel before he was spotted by Club Brugge.

=== Club Brugge ===
Fadiga quickly became a fan favorite. He scored nine goals in 67 appearances. In September 2000, the midfielder returned to France when he signed for Auxerre.

=== Auxerre ===
In all, he played in 82 league games for the French club, scoring 10 goals, as well as appearing in the Champions League and UEFA Cup during season 2002–03. In his final season at Auxerre, he helped them win the 2002–03 Coupe de France, playing in the final as they defeated Paris Saint-Germain.

=== Internazionale ===
Fadiga moved to Internazionale in the summer of 2003, but the discovery of heart problems did not allow him to feature for the Italian club, apart from appearing in a few friendly games during the summer. He was released from the San Siro side after just one season but decided against retirement despite his heart problems.

=== Bolton Wanderers ===
English club Bolton Wanderers signed Fadiga for the 2004–05 season after he passed a medical. However, before he made an appearance for Bolton, he collapsed prior to a match in the Carling Cup at home to Tottenham Hotspur F.C. in October, and had to be fitted with a defibrillator due to an irregular heartbeat. Despite stating his desire to return to the game, medical specialists urged him to retire, warning that if during a game his chest was knocked the defibrillator could fail, leading to instant death. However, following a period of rest and passing a medical, Fadiga returned to the Bolton squad in early 2005 and played in five games.

At the start of the 2005–06 campaign, Fadiga was loaned to Derby County of the Football League Championship, making four appearances. On his return to the Reebok Stadium, he took part in ten games, two of them in the UEFA Cup, before eventually being released in May 2006.

=== Coventry City ===
Without a club at the start of the 2006–07 season, he went on trial with Portsmouth and played for their reserve team. He also had trials at Watford and Hull City, before eventually signing a four-month contract with Coventry City on 23 February 2007. In April 2007, he suffered a serious achilles injury in the home game against Preston, and it ended his time at Coventry.

=== Return to Belgium ===
He returned to his wife's homeland, signing with AA Gent. After one year, he moved in June 2008 to Germinal Beerschot, but left Beerschot after short time in December 2008. He signed for Third Division club KSV Temse in 2011, before retiring from the game.

== Personal life ==
Fadiga is married to a Belgian woman and has two kids, Noah and Naoel. Noah followed in his footsteps in becoming a professional footballer. Fadiga also holds Belgian nationality.

== Career statistics ==
Scores and results list Senegal's goal tally first, score column indicates score after each Fadiga goal.

List of international goals scored by Khalilou Fadiga
No.	Date	Venue	Opponent	Score	Result	Competition
1	7 February 2000	National Stadium, Lagos, Nigeria	Nigeria	1–0	1–2 (a.e.t.)	2000 Africa Cup of Nations
2	21 July 2001	Sam Nujoma Stadium, Windhoek, Namibia	Namibia	4–0	5–0	2002 FIFA World Cup qualification
3	6 June 2002	Suwon World Cup Stadium, Suwon, South Korea	Uruguay	1–0	3–3	2002 FIFA World Cup
4	26 March 2005	Stade Léopold Sédar Senghor, Dakar, Senegal	Liberia	1–0	6–1	2006 FIFA World Cup qualification
