= Lamine Diatta =

Senegalese footballer (born 1975)

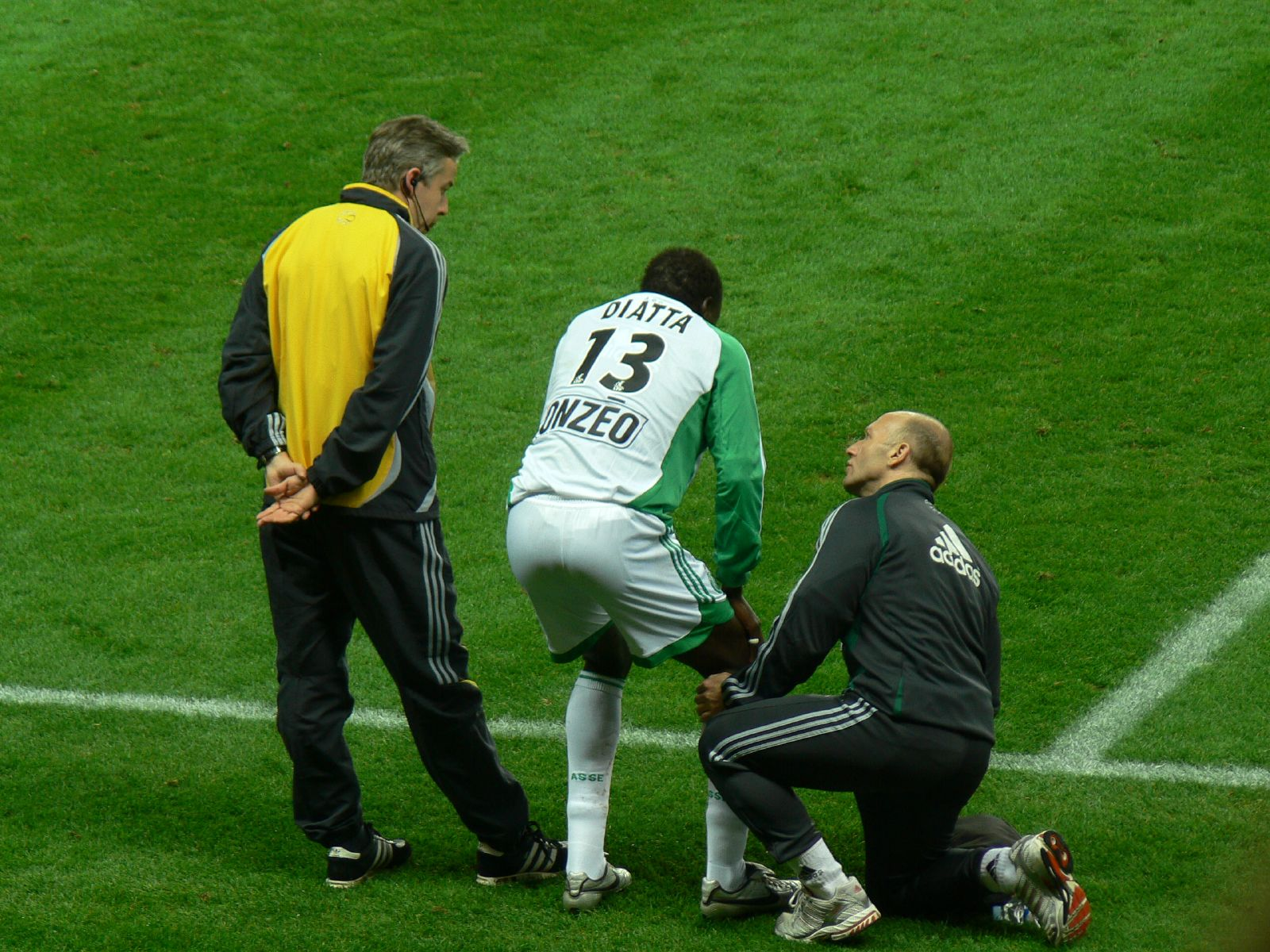
- Diatta with Saint-Étienne in 2006

Personal information
- Full name: Lamine Diatta
- Date of birth: 2 July 1975 (age 51)
- Place of birth: Dakar, Senegal
- Height: 1.87 m (6 ft 2 in)
- Position: Centre-back

Senior career*
Years	Team	Apps	(Gls)
1998–1999	Toulouse	25	(0)
1999	Marseille	0	(0)
1999–2004	Rennes	129	(11)
2004–2006	Lyon	30	(0)
2006–2007	Saint-Étienne	25	(1)
2007–2008	Beşiktaş	6	(0)
2008	Newcastle United	2	(0)
2009	Hamilton Academical	0	(0)
2009–2010	Al-Ahli	0	(0)
2011	Étoile Sportive du Sahel	12	(0)
2011–2012	Doncaster Rovers	0	(0)
Total		229	(12)

International career
2000–2008	Senegal	71	(4)
- * Club domestic league appearances and goals

Lamine Diatta (born 2 July 1975) is a Senegalese former professional footballer who played as a centre-back. He works as team coordinator of Senegal, appointed by head coach Aliou Cissé in 2015.

During his 14-year professional career, Diatta played for clubs in France, Turkey, England, Scotland, Qatar and Tunisia.

== Club career ==
Born in Dakar, Senegal, Diatta moved to France when he was only one year old.

Before moving to Lyon in 2004, Diatta played 142 games for Rennes, scoring nine goals in that time. Before his time at Rennes, he was at Marseille, but never actually played a game for them. Diatta's first club was Toulouse. He spent one season there and played 25 games without scoring. In his first year (2004–05) with Lyon he played 19 games. During his second year (2005–06) at Lyon, he was troubled with injury and only makes 13 appearances also without goals. In August 2006, he left Lyon on free transfer in search for regular team football, settling at AS Saint-Étienne.

On 7 March 2008, after a week's trial at Newcastle United, Diatta agreed to a short-term deal until the end of the season after buying out his contract at Beşiktaş The deal was finally confirmed by the club on 14 March after a week of confusion. He made his first team debut for Newcastle as a substitute in a Premier League match against Reading on 5 April but was released on 15 May.

Diatta joined Stoke City on trial in January 2009. On 20 March, however, he signed for Hamilton Academical on a short-term deal until the end of the season.

After just one month, on 25 April, the 33-year-old Senegalese defender left Hamilton to join Al Ahli Doha in Qatar.

Without a club since his release from Al Ahli he participated in trials in Singapore without being snapped up by a club.

He then joined Étoile Sportive du Sahel of the CLP-1 in Tunisia.

In December 2011 he signed a short-term deal with Championship team Doncaster Rovers, where fellow countrymen El Hadji Diouf and Habib Beye also played for the club.

== International career ==
Being the Senegal's captain, he has played 71 games for his national side, scoring four goals. He also played in all of Senegal's matches in the 2002 FIFA World Cup.

== Style of play ==
Diatta was the holding force in the centre of Senegal's defence, and is also tough in the air, which provides a threat in attacking set-pieces.

== Honours ==
Lyon

- Ligue 1: 2004–05, 2005–06
- Trophée des Champions: 2005

Senegal

- Africa Cup of Nations runner-up: 2002
