= List of Algerian football players in foreign leagues =

List of association football players

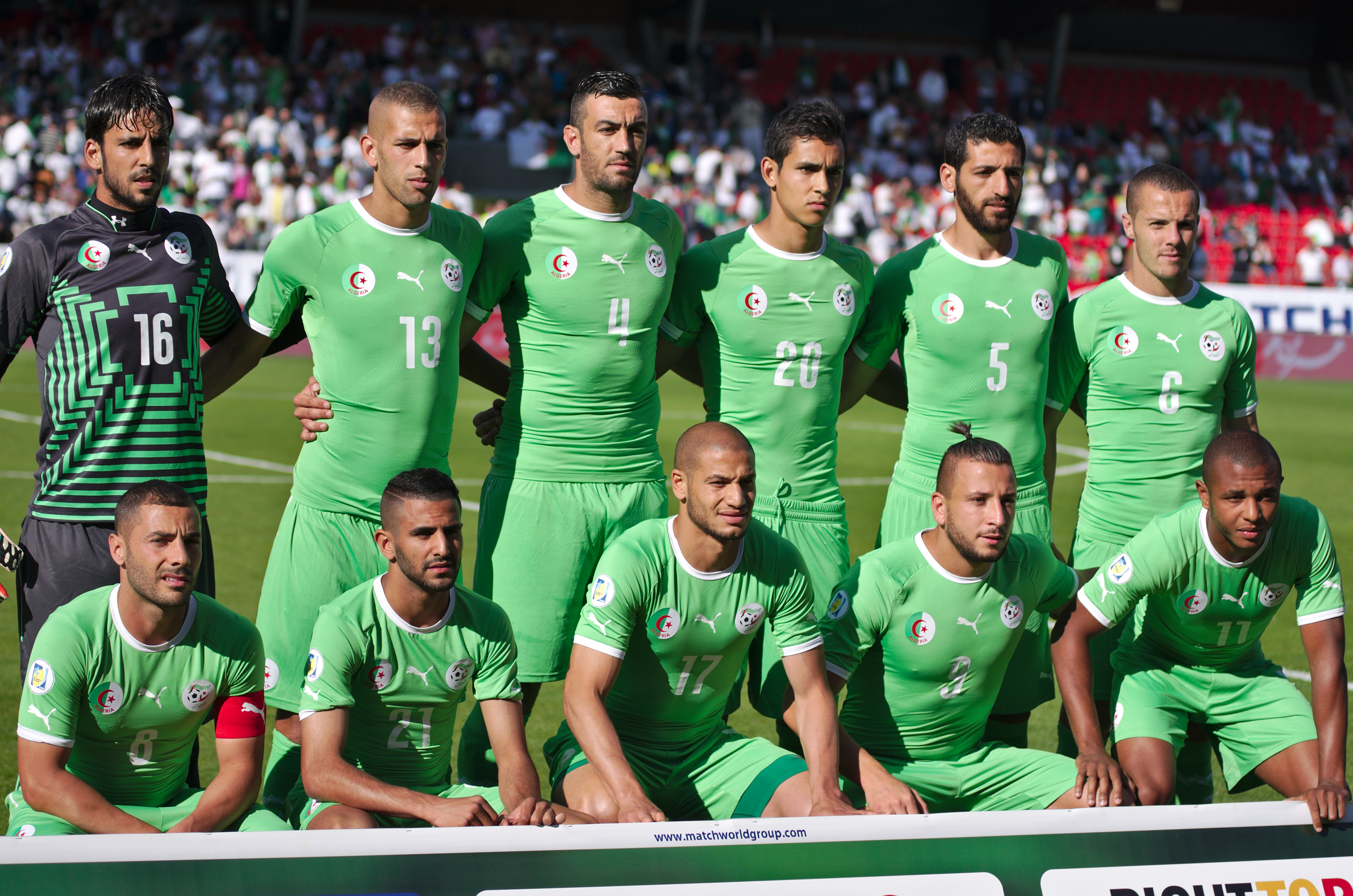
Algeria national football team in 2014 From Left to Right: Standing : Zemmamouche (USM Alger) – Slimani (Sporting CP) – Belkalem (Watford) – Mandi (Stade Reims) – Halliche (Académica Coimbra) – Mesbah (Livorno) Crouching Lacen (Getafe) (C) – Mahrez (Leicester City) – Guedioura (Crystal Palace) – Ghilas (Porto) – Brahimi (Granada).

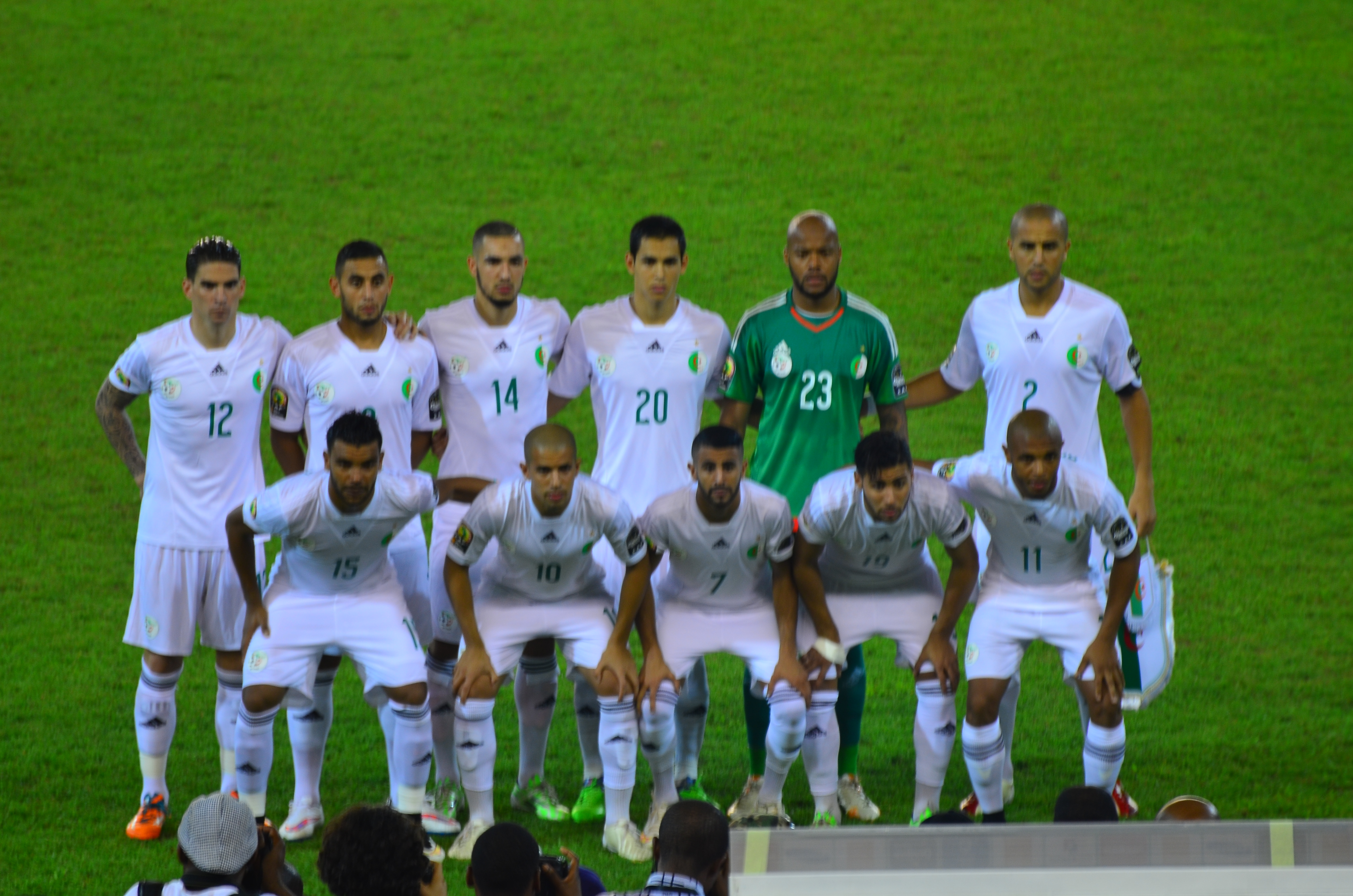
Algeria national football team in 2015 From Left to Right: Standing : Medjani (Trabzonspor) – Ghoulam (Napoli) – Bentaleb (Tottenham Hotspur) – Mandi (Stade Reims) – M'Bolhi (Philadelphia Union) – Bougherra (Al-Fujairah) (C) Crouching Soudani (Dinamo Zagreb) – Feghouli (Valencia) – Mahrez (Leicester City) – Taïder (Sassuolo) – Brahimi (Porto).

This is a complete list of Algerian football players in foreign leagues, i.e. association football players who have played in foreign leagues.

For most of the twentieth century, most Algeria internationals played in the native Algerian Ligue Professionnelle 1; however, the national team has included some players based abroad from the beginning. While some in the 1960s and 1970s played for Algerian clubs, for example Hacène Lalmas and Mokhtar Khalem at CR Belcourt, others played in France, such as Sadek Boukhalfa with Nantes or Mustapha Zitouni with AS Monaco. Seven players of the squad for the 1982 FIFA World Cup came from a foreign club: Abdelmajid Bourebbou (Stade Lavallois), Mustapha Dahleb (Paris SG), Djamel Tlemcani (Stade de Reims), Djamel Zidane (KV Kortrijk), Karim Maroc (FC Tours), Faouzi Mansouri (Montpellier HSC) and Nourredine Kourichi (Girondins Bordeaux). By the time of the 1986 World Cup that number had increased to 11 (50% of the squad), and at the 2010 and 2014 tournaments almost all were playing abroad (there were three and two home-based players respectively in the 23-man squads).

== The history of Algerian players in Europe ==
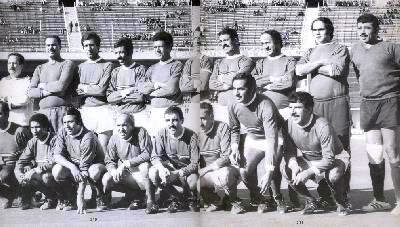
Founded in conditions of secrecy in 1958 during the French colonial period in Algeria, all of the members of the FLN team were professionals in France From Left to Right: Standing A.Sellami – Doudou – Zouba – Rouaï – Amara – Zitouni – M. Soukhane – Bouricha – Oudjani – Boubekeur Crouching Mazouz – Kerroum – Benfadah – Bouchouk – A. Soukhane – Kermali – Mekhloufi – Oualiken.

A large number of Algerian players have played in Europe, especially in France, the former colonial ruler of Algeria. The first Algerian player in Europe and first North African to play in France was Ali Benouna who joined Sète in 1930. He is the first Algerian player to win a European title, having won the French league and Coupe de France of the 1933–34 season with Sète. Benouna paved the way for more Algerians to soon taste the success of the French league. This was done by Abdelkader Ben Bouali in the colors of Olympique de Marseille in the 1936–37 season, then Mohamed Firoud and Abdelaziz Ben Tifour on two consecutive occasions with Nice in 1950–51 and 1951–52, in addition to Rachid Mekhloufi in 1956–57 with Saint Etienne and Mohamed Maouche in the next season with Stade de Reims; all these titles came in the colonial era. As for the first player to win a title outside France, Mekhloufi holds that accolade for winning the Swiss League in 1962.

In relation to statistics, the most prominent of these are Rachid Mekhloufi, star of AS Saint-Étienne who scored 150 goals and won the four league titles. There is also Mustapha Dahleb, former star for Paris Saint-Germain where he achieved two Coupe de France victories and is one of the most popular players in the history of the club (310 matches and 98 goals in 10 seasons). Rabah Madjer was perhaps the best Algerian player to turn professional in Europe; he claimed ten trophies with FC Porto: three League, two Cup and two Super Cup on the domestic level and two continental titles on the level, including the European Cup in 1987 becoming the first Algerian and an African player to achieve this feat, and the Intercontinental Cup in Japan against Peñarol from Uruguay in which he scored the winning goal. In the 1970s and 1980s, Algerian players were generally not allowed to play professionally until they were over 28 years old which deprived many of the stars of the Algerian team at the time of a top-level career, especially after the 1982 FIFA World Cup, including Mehdi Cerbah, Hocine Yahi, Chaabane Merzekane, Fodil Megharia, Hacène Lalmas, Mahmoud Guendouz, Ali Bencheikh, Ali Fergani, Lakhdar Belloumi, Djamel Menad, Tedj Bensaoula and Omar Betrouni; some of them did play professionally but did not achieve much success because of their advancing age. There were some players allowed to move abroad even though they had not reached the age of 28: Djamel Zidane, Rabah Madjer and Salah Assad.

Several other players have achieved prominent titles: Rafik Djebbour won eight titles, four League and 4 in the cu, followed by El Arbi Hillel Soudani with 7 titles including three league and three cup, then Madjid Bougherra who won six trophies with Glasgow Rangers. Ahmed Reda Madouni was the first Algerian Bundesliga champion in the colours of Borussia Dortmund in the 2001–02 season (subsequently his career involved a strange fluctuation). in Eastern Europe, Selim Bouadla was crowned Hungarian league winner with Debrecen twice in the 2011–12 and 2013–14 season, noting that La Liga and Serie A has not tasted the taste of any Algerian player so far and the nearest thing was the Runner-up in Serie A by Djamel Mesbah in 2012 and Faouzi Ghoulam in 2016. The English Premier League, was won by Riyad Mahrez with Leicester City. The 2012–13 season is considered the best for Algerian players, when they won 12 titles including three league, seven cups, three Super Cup and one league cup achieved by seven players are Djebbour, Soudani, Abdoun, Ghoulam, Rani, Sayoud and Benzia, In 2018–19, Riyad Mahrez achieved the English treble with Manchester City as the first Algerian to achieve this achievement. In the 2017–18 season, 161 Algerian players (including those of the diaspora who represent the national team) featured across all the leagues in Europe, and were present in 31 of the 55 leagues.

At the level of individual titles, Mahrez won the 2016 PFA Players' Player of the Year award. He was the first African to earn the accolade. Ali Benarbia also achieved the best player award in the French league with Girondins de Bordeaux. Sofiane Hanni also won the best player award in the Belgian league with Mechelen as the first Algerian player to achieve this award. El Arabi Hillel Soudani, with Dinamo Zagreb, also won his first trophy in Croatia as the best player in the Prva liga after a vote of all the captains of the Prva liga Croatian clubs. As for top scorers, only two Algerian players have achieved the title of top scorer of a league in Europe: Ahmed Oudjani in the French league and Jabbour in the Greek league. Madjer also won the title of top scorer in the European Cup in the 1987–88 season. Makhloufi is considered the best Algerian scorer in Europe with 170 goals, including 156 in the league, followed by Djebbour with 132 goals, of which 110 were in the league, and then Dahleb with 115 goals, including 102 in the league. For the most games played in leagues, there is Rachid Mekhloufi with 360 games, Abdelkader Ferhaoui with 343, Ryad Boudebouz with 328, Mustapha Dahleb with 321, and finally Mohamed Salem with 308 games. On the other hand, the record for most hat-tricks is held by Makhloufi with 9, all with Saint-Étienne, then Madjer with 5, and finally Ahmed Oudjani and El Arbi Hillel Soudani with 4 hat-tricks.

At the country level, Algerian players have won 61 titles in France: sixteen league, twenty-five cup, nine Coupe de la Ligue and eleven Trophée des Champions. After that comes Luxembourg with twenty titles: fourteen League and six cups, and finally Scotland with thirteen titles: five Premiership, four Cup and four League Cup. Other countries where Algerian players have won at least one title are the 17 states in the following figure: Azerbaijan, Belgium, Bulgaria, Croatia, Cyprus, England, Finland, Germany, Greece, Hungary, Italy, Northern Ireland, Portugal, Romania, Switzerland, Czechoslovak and Turkey. With the beginning of the Algeria national team's sparkling form in 2009, Algerian players' shares began to rise in Europe, such as El Arbi Hillel Soudani, who moved from ASO Chlef to Vitória Guimarães of Portugal. There are also Islam Slimani from CR Belouizdad to Sporting CP, who then moved to Leicester City in the most expensive transfer deal for an Algerian player in history. The transfer fee paid to Sporting was reported as £28 million, a club record for Leicester. There is also the Paradou AC/JMG "El Ankaoui" Academy, which graduated many players to Europe, including Ramy Bensebaini, Youcef Attal, Haithem Loucif, Farid El Mellali and Hicham Boudaoui, who became the most expensive Algerian player to move from an Algerian club to Europe, at €4,000,000.

== Gallery ==
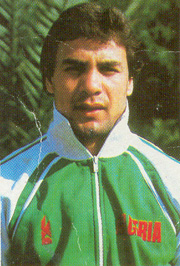
Rabah Madjer won 6 titles, all with FC Porto including the European Cup.

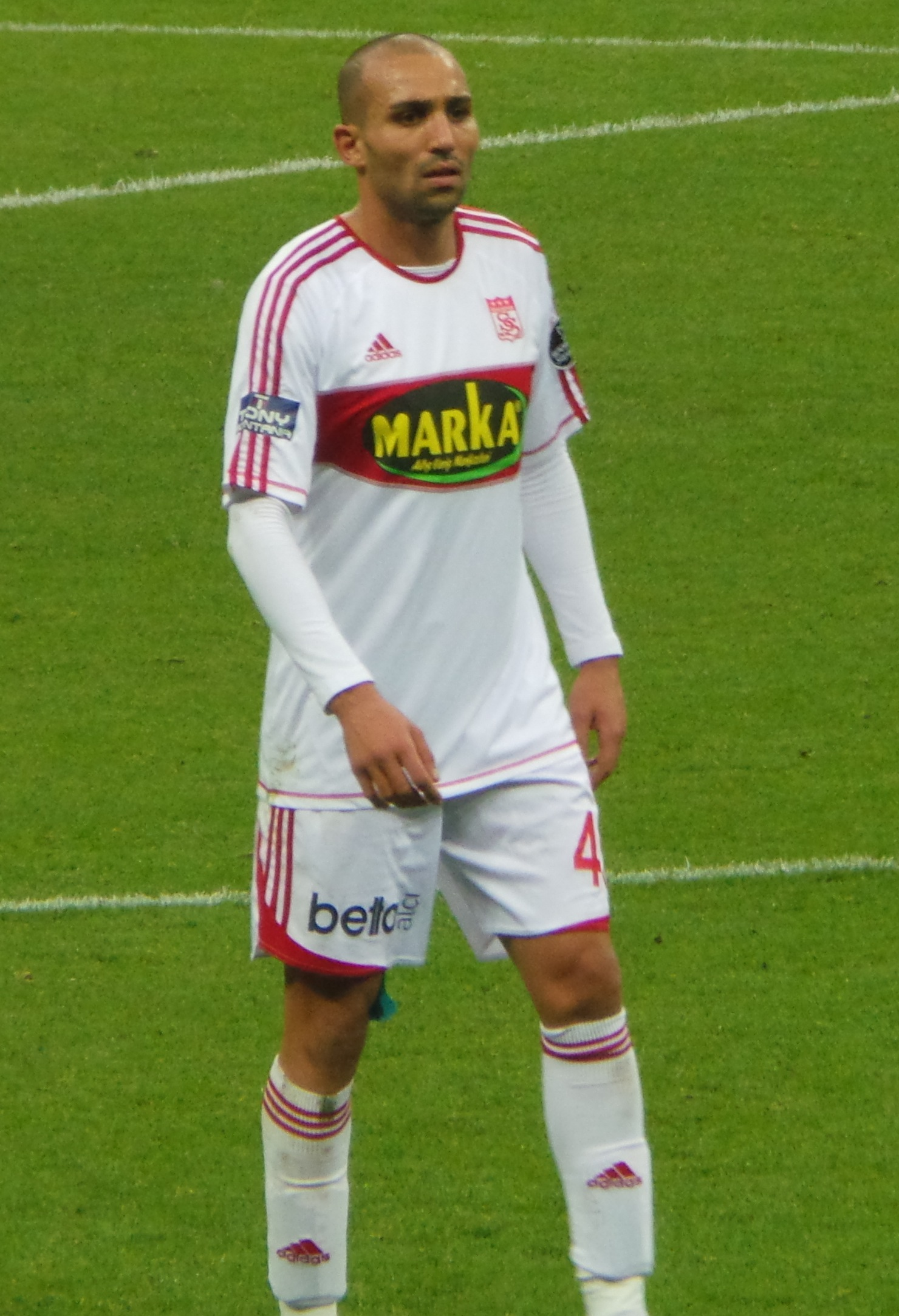
Rafik Djebbour won eight titles in two countries, Greece and Cyprus.

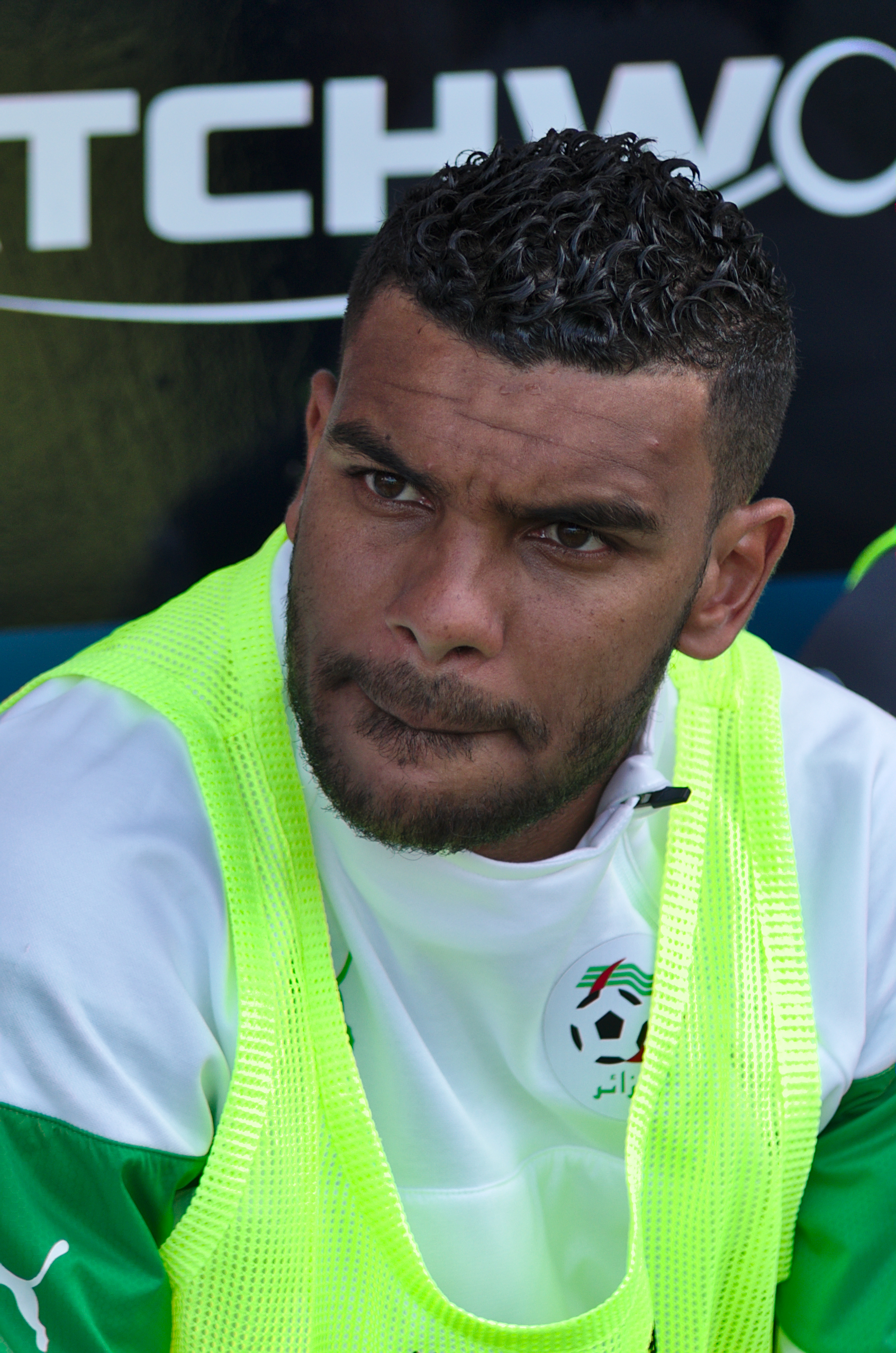
El Arabi Hillel Soudani won nine titles, eight of them with Dinamo Zagreb.

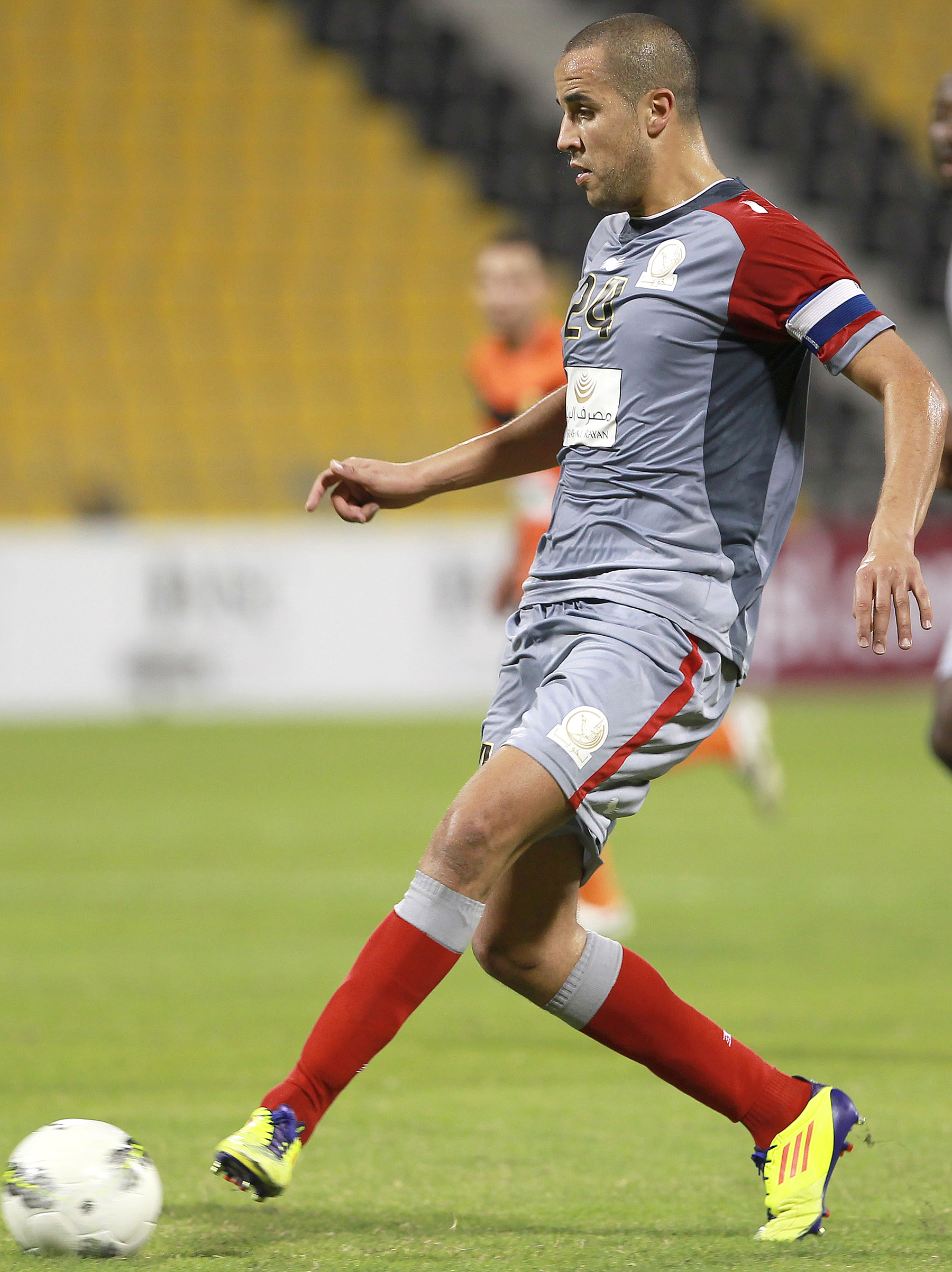
Madjid Bougherra Won six titles, all with Glasgow Rangers.

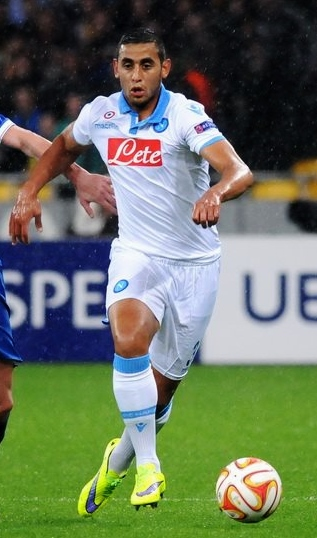
Faouzi Ghoulam won three titles, one with Saint-Étienne and two with Napoli.

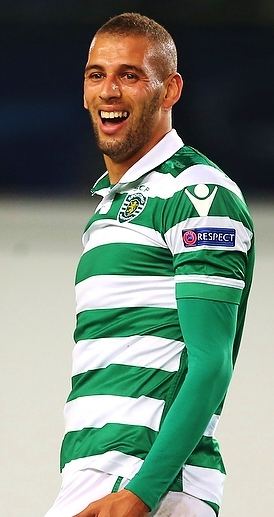
Islam Slimani won two titles with Sporting CP and is considered the most expensive Algerian player.
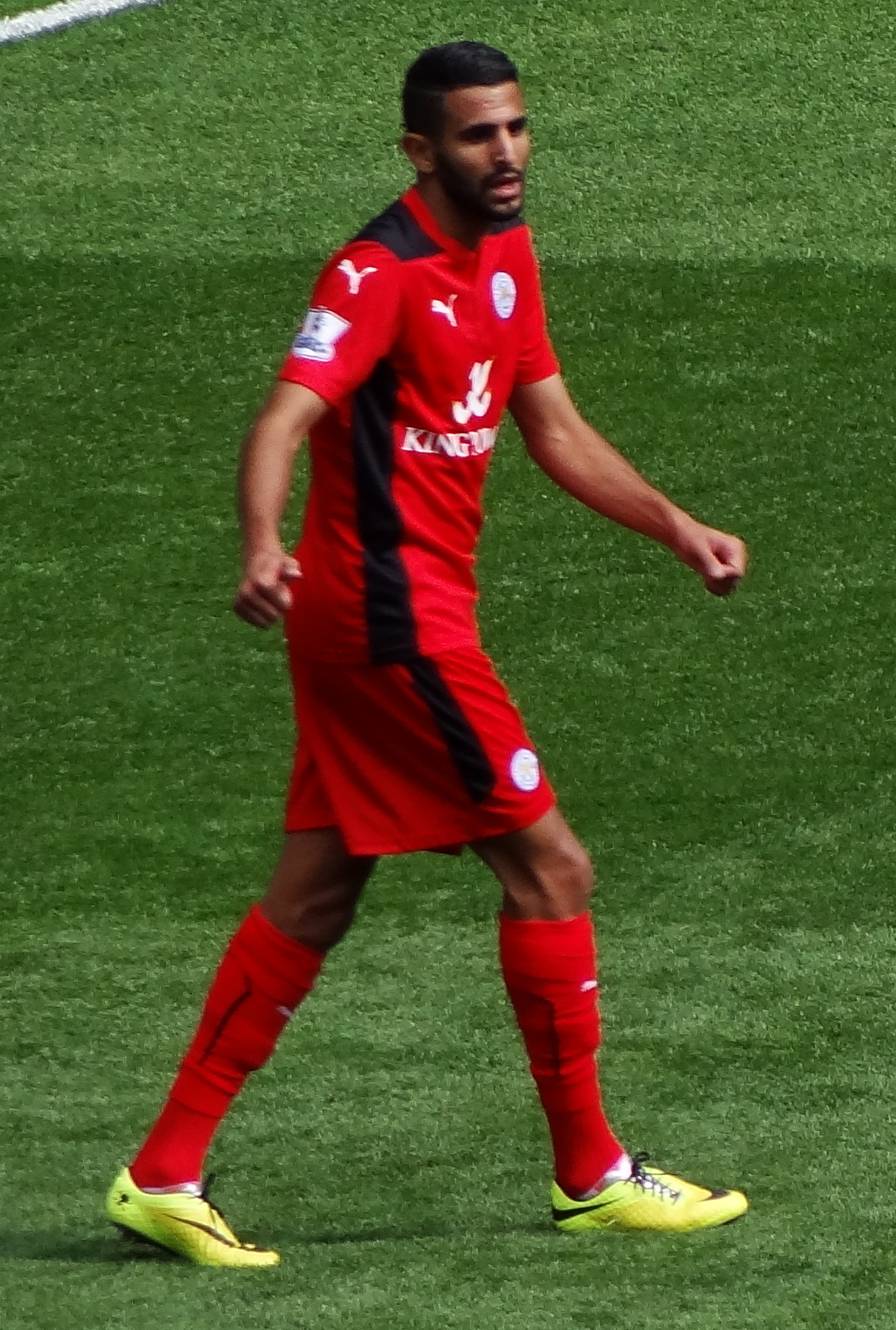
Riyad Mahrez won the Premier League title twice and the PFA Players' Player of the Year.

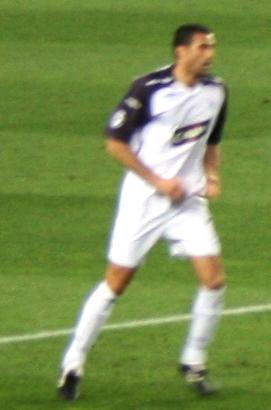
Brahim Hemdani won all four titles with Glasgow Rangers and reached twice the final of UEFA Cup in 2004 and 2008.

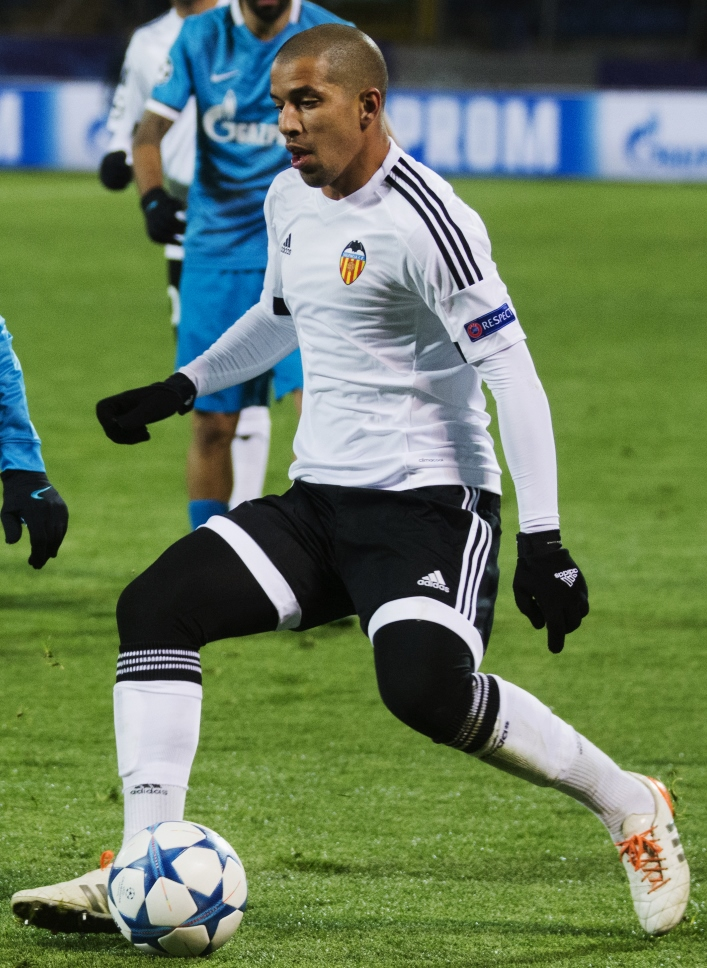
Sofiane Feghouli 243 Match play and scored 42 goals in six seasons with Valencia.

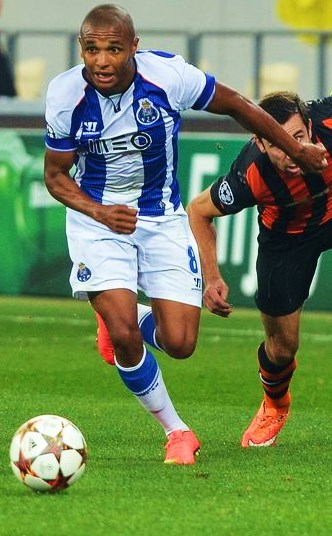
Yacine Brahimi The first Algerian player to score a hat-trick in the UEFA Champions League.

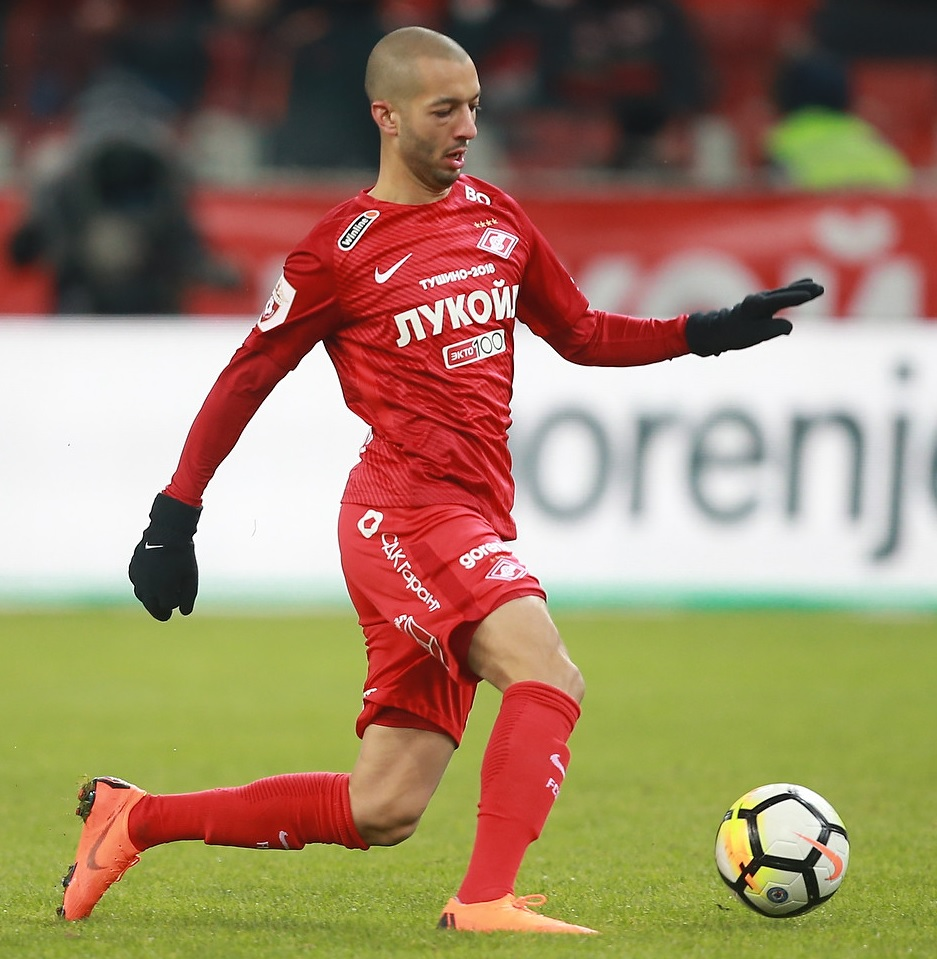
Sofiane Hanni won two titles with Anderlecht.

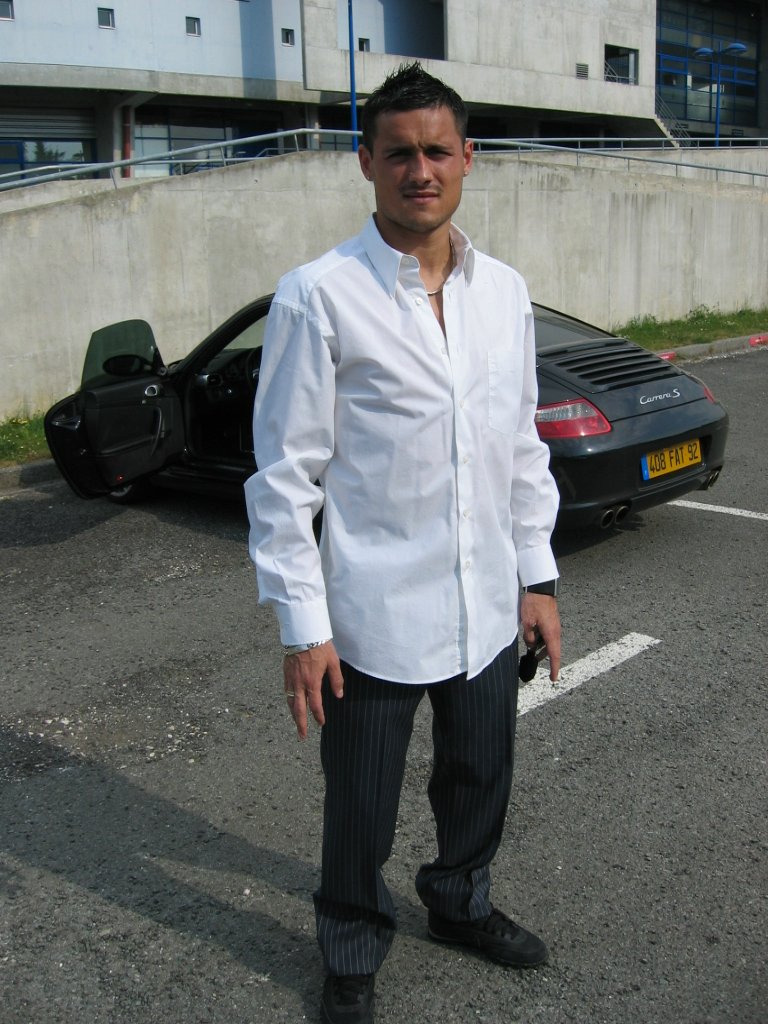
Karim Ziani The former star of the Algeria national team and Marseille won a single title with Sochaux.

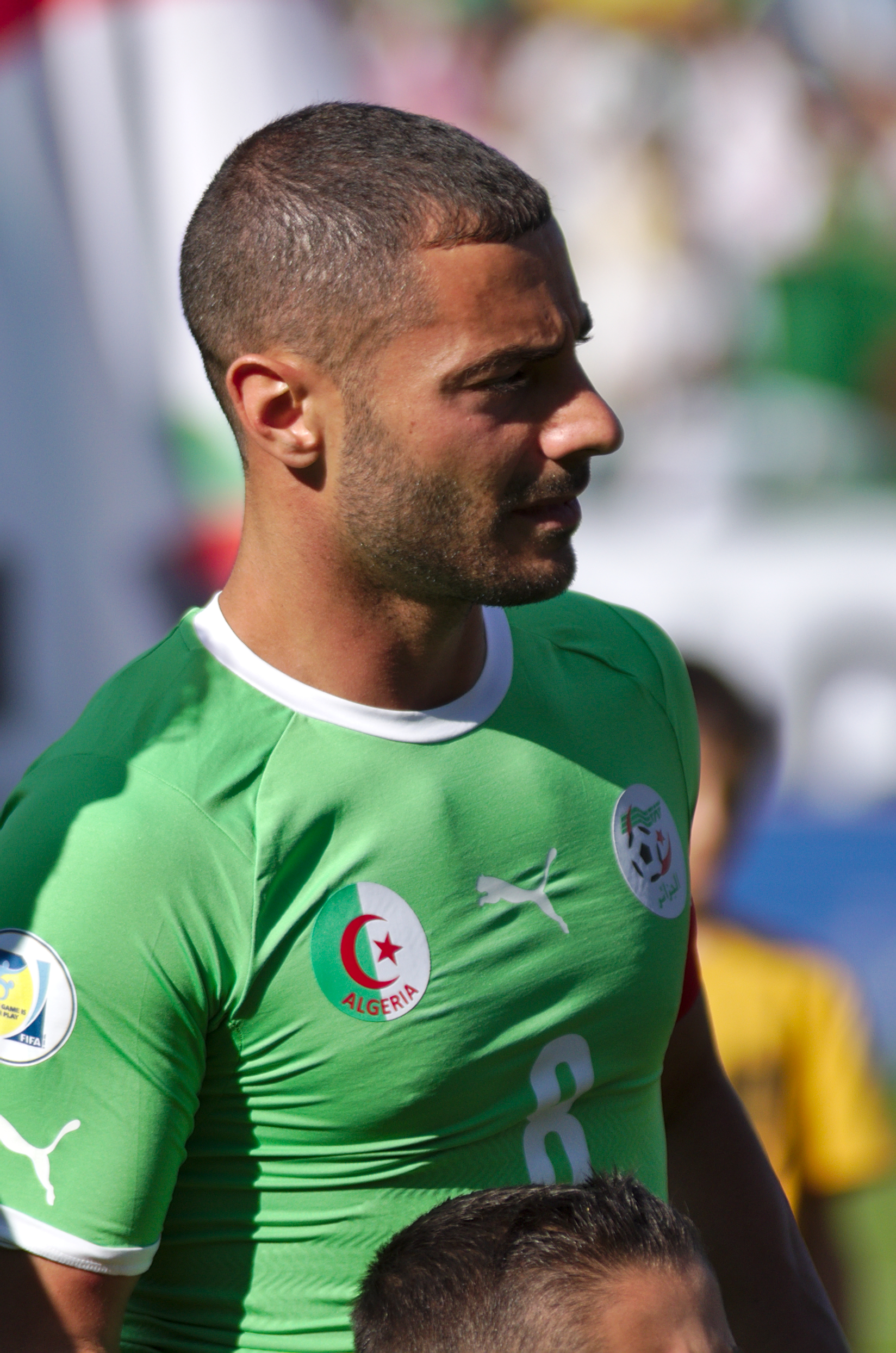
Medhi Lacen the most Algerian player to play in the Spanish league with 254 game in nine seasons.

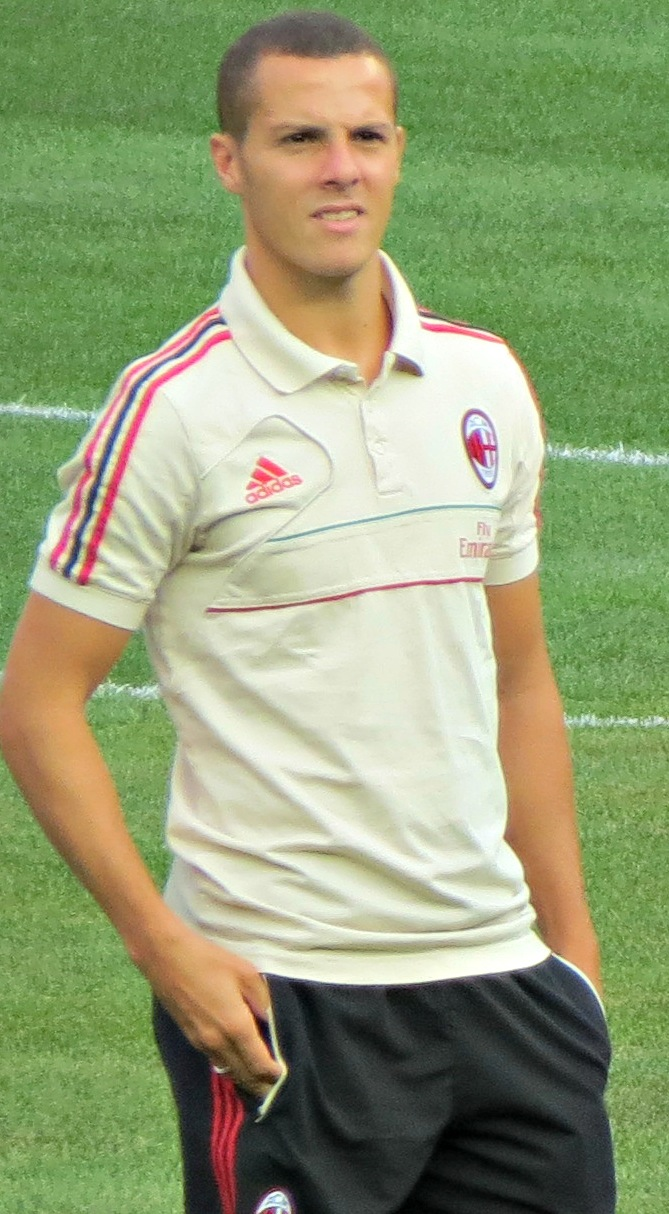
Djamel Mesbah won a single title with FC Basel and turn professional with Italian giant AC Milan.

=== Algerian descent players played for other national teams ===
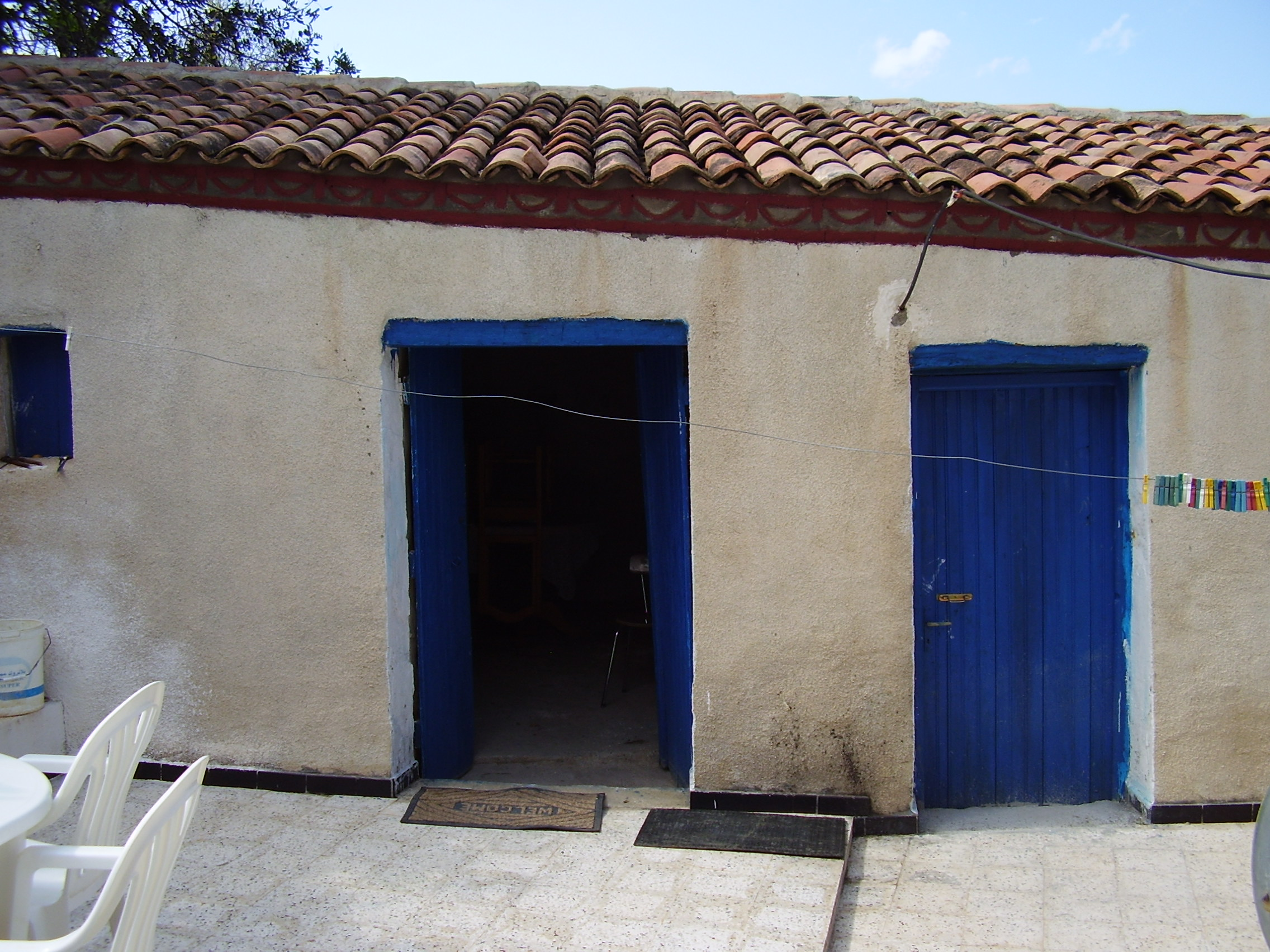
The home of Zidane's parents in the village of Aguemoune Ath Slimane in Algeria.

Due to Algeria's historic ties with France, there have been a number of Algerian players playing professionally in the French leagues, while the France national team has included players of Algerian heritage, most notably Zinedine Zidane, Karim Benzema and Samir Nasri.

- Zinedine Zidane (Arabic: زين الدين يزيد زيدان) was born on 23 June 1972 in La Castellane, Marseille, in Southern France. Zidane is of Algerian Kabyle descent. His parents, Smaïl and Malika, emigrated to Paris from the village of Aguemoune in the Berber-speaking region of Kabylie in northern Algeria in 1953 before the start of the Algerian War. The family, which had settled in the city's tough northern districts of Barbès and Saint-Denis, found little work in the region
- Karim Benzema was born in the city of Lyon, France, to French nationals of Algerian descent. As a practicing Muslim, he observes fasting during the Islamic holy month of Ramadan. His grandfather, Da Lakehal Benzema, lived in the village of Tigzirt, located in the northern town of Beni Djellil in Algeria before migrating to Lyon, where he eventually settled in the 1950s. Benzema's father, Hafid, was born in Tigzirt, while his mother, Wahida Djebbara, was born and raised in Lyon; her family originated from Oran. Benzema is the third youngest in the family and grew up with eight other siblings in Bron, an eastern suburb of Lyon. His younger brothers Gressy and Sabri are also footballers. The former currently plies his trade at the amateur level with Vaulx-le-Velin in the Division d'Honneur, the sixth division of French football, while the latter plays in the youth academy of a club in the family's hometown of Bron.
- Samir Nasri (Arabic: سمير نصري) was born in Septèmes-les-Vallons, a northern suburb of Marseille, to French nationals of Algerian descent. His mother, Ouassila Ben Saïd, and father, Abdelhafid Nasri, were both born in France; his father being born and raised in Marseille, while his mother being from nearby Salon-de-Provence. Nasri's grandparents emigrated to France from Algeria. His mother is a housewife and his father previously worked as a bus driver before becoming his son's personal manager. At the start of his football career, Nasri initially played under his mother's surname, Ben Saïd, before switching to Nasri, his father's surname, following his selection to the France under-16 team. He is the eldest of four children and is a non-practising Muslim.
- Nabil Fekir had earned one cap at the under-21 level for his native France. Fekir had been named in his ancestral Algeria's squad for friendlies against Oman and Qatar in March 2015. However, he withdrew to take part in the French squad for friendlies against Brazil and Denmark. He made his debut on 26 March against the former at the Stade de France, replacing Antoine Griezmann for the final 16 minutes of a 1–3 defeat. He scored his first goal on 7 June, concluding a 3–4 home friendly defeat to Belgium. On 4 September, in a 1–0 away friendly win over Portugal, he ruptured three ligaments in his right knee, putting him out for an estimated six months.
- Karim Boudiaf (Arabic: كريم بوضياف) was born in France, and is of Moroccan-Algerian descent. On December 22, 2009, Boudiaf was called up to the Algeria Under-23 national team for a training camp in Algiers. Boudiaf acquired Qatari nationality and was called up to the Qatar national football team on November 13, 2013. He was capped in an unofficial friendly exhibition match against Saudi club Al Hilal. He made his official debut for the team on 25 December in the 2014 WAFF Championship in a 1–0 win against Palestine.
- Boualem Khoukhi (Arabic: بوعلام خوخي) was born and raised in Algeria. On November 9, 2010, Khoukhi was called up for the first time to the Algeria under–23 national team for a pair of friendlies against Tunisia. The Qatar Football Association attempted to naturalize Khoukhi shortly after he arrived in Qatar, however, he refused and claimed that he would not be naturalized for any amount of money. He stated his desire was to play with the senior Algeria national team. Subsequently, he received Qatari citizenship in order to assist in his club's foreign player quota. Despite his call up to Algeria's olympic team, he was called up to the Qatar B team on November 13, 2013, by compatriot Djamel Belmadi. When questioned about Khoukhi's call-up to the squad, Belmadi claimed that Khoukhi was naturalized prior to his call-up in order for his team, Al Arabi, to overcome the foreign player quota. Belmadi stated he was surprised when the QFA revealed Khoukhi was eligible to be called up to the Qatar national team. He made his official debut for the team on December 25 in the 2014 WAFF Championship in a 1–0 win against Palestine.
- Houssem Aouar (Arabic: حسام عوار) is eligible to feature for Algeria despite playing for French youth teams at the U17 and U21 levels. In 2018, he was reported considering to represent Algeria at international level following a talk with former Lyon and current Al Hilal striker Karim Benzema. In January 2019, the then-manager of Algeria Djamel Belmadi confirmed that he would visit Aouar and present the vision and project of the Desert Foxes in hope of convincing him to play in the upcoming Africa Cup of Nations. On 26 August 2020, Aouar received his first call-up for France to prepare for 2020–21 UEFA Nations League matches against Sweden and Croatia in early September. He made his debut on 7 October 2020 in a friendly against Ukraine. After years of back and forth rumours on his nationality change. In March 2023, Aouar switched his international allegiance from his birth country of France to the country of his parents, Algeria. In an interview with the Algerian Football Federation, he said, "the president held out his hand to me and it seemed like it was just meant to be. I had a second chance and I jumped on it." He also added that he "regretted" having played for France, saying that he felt he "hadn't made the best choice".

== European League ==
=== Armenia ===
Player	Club(s)	Period
Hossin Lagoun	Ararat Yerevan	2019
Nagui Bouras	Ararat Yerevan	2015

=== Azerbaijan ===
Player	Club(s)	Period
Yacine Hima	Neftchi PFK	2011
Bilal Hamdi	Zira FK	2018–19
Yassine Benzia	Qarabağ FK	2023–

=== Belgium ===
Player	Club(s)	Period
Djamel Zidane	Kortrijk, Genk	1980–85, 1985–86
Zahir Zerdab	Zulte Waregem	2008–09
Sofiene Zaaboub	FC Brussels	2005–06
Zinou Chergui	Waasland-Beveren	2002–03
Badis Lebbihi	Zulte Waregem	2009–10
Boualem Merrir	Royal Antwerp FC	2001–02
Mohamed Salem	Daring de Bruxelles	1965–67
Idir Ouali	Mouscron, Kortrijk	2007–09, 2016–
Ishak Belfodil	Standard Liège	2016–18
Rachid Aït-Atmane	Waasland-Beveren	2018
Khaled Kharroubi	Dender	2008–09
Sofiane Hanni	KV Mechelen, Anderlecht	2014–16, 2016–18
Mourad Satli	KV Mechelen	2015–16
Ismael Abdellali	KV Mechelen	1989–90
Nordine Hameg	Harelbeke	1995–00
Djamel Abdoun	Lokeren	2014–15
Youcef Attal	Kortrijk	2017–18
Samy Kehli	Lokeren	2017
Mohamed Dahmane	Mons, Genk, Club Brugge	2006 and 2007–09, 2006–07, 2009–10
Fadel Brahami	Louviéroise, Mons	2004–06, 2006–09
Nasser Daineche	Louviéroise, Roeselare	2004–05, 2008–09
Mansour Boutabout	Kortrijk	2008–09
Ramy Bensebaini	Lierse	2014–15
Nadjem Lens Annab	Westerlo, Lierse	2009–12, 2012–13
Karim Bridji	Anderlecht, Eendracht Aalst	2000–01, 2001–02
Hemza Mihoubi	Charleroi	2006–07
Samir Beloufa	Germinal Beerschot, Mouscron, Westerlo	2000–02, 2003–05, 2005–07
Farid Belmellat	Liège	1992–93
Toufik Zerara	Germinal Beerschot	2007–08
Salah Bakour	Kortrijk	2008–10
Fayçal Lebbihi	Waasland-Beveren	2013–14
Zoubir Bachi	Charleroi	1979–80
Youssef Sofiane	La Louvière	2005–06
Mohamed Amroune	RAEC Mons	2007–09
Mohamed Chakouri	Charleroi	2008–11
Mehdi Guerrouad	La Louvière	2002–03
Djamel Amani	Royal Antwerp FC	1988–89
Karim Fellahi	Mouscron, FC Brussels	2005–2008, 2008–09
Rafik Djebbour	La Louvière	2004–05
Adlène Guedioura	Kortrijk, Charleroi	2008–09, 2009–10
Kamel Ghilas	Charleroi	2014
Mehdi Makhloufi	Beveren, KV Oostende	2000–01, 2004
Maamar Mamouni	Louviéroise, KAA Gent, Lierse SK	2003–04, 2004–06, 2006–07
Madjid Adjaoud	KAA Gent	2002–05
Nasreddine Kraouche	KAA Gent, Charleroi	1999–04, 2004–06
Yacine Hima	KAS Eupen	2010
Abdelmalek Cherrad	KAA Gent	2004
Ahmed Touba	Club Brugge, OH Leuven	2016–0, 209
Idriss Saadi	Kortrijk, Cercle Brugge	2016–17, 2019–20
Mehdi Terki	Lokeren	2016–19
Réda Halaïmia	K Beerschot VA	2020–22
Adem Zorgane	Charleroi	2021–
Billel Messaoudi	Kortrijk	2021–
Abdelkahar Kadri	Kortrijk	2021–
Mohamed Amoura	Union SG	2023–

=== Bulgaria ===
Player	Club(s)	Period
Farès Brahimi	Minyor Pernik, Montana	2011–2012, 2013
Sabri Boumelaha	Minyor Pernik	2011–13
Fadel Brahami	Minyor Pernik	2010–12
Jugurtha Hamroun	Chernomorets	2011–12
Raïs M'Bolhi	Slavia Sofia, CSKA Sofia	2009–10, 2010, 2011–12, 2013–14
Najib Ammari	Chernomorets, Levski Sofia	2013, 2014
Salim Kerkar	Beroe Stara Zagora, Vereya	2014–16, 2016–18
Ilias Hassani	Vereya, Cherno More	2016–17, 2017–19
Mehdi Fennouche	Lokomotiv Gorna, Vereya, Cherno More	2017, 2017–18, 2018–
Nassim Zitouni	Dunav	2018
Nabil Ejenavi	Montana	2016
Farid Benramdane	Minyor Pernik	2011–2013
Amir Sayoud	Beroe Stara Zagora	2013–14
Yanis Youcef	Chernomorets Burgas	2012–13

=== Czech Republic ===
Player	Club(s)	Period
Damien Boudjemaa	Slavia Prague	2014–2016
Faouzi Bourenane	Příbram	2016–2017
Nordine Assami	Příbram	2009

=== Croatia ===
Player	Club(s)	Period
El Arbi Hillel Soudani	Dinamo Zagreb	2013–18
Monsef Bakrar	Istra 1961	2022–23

=== Cyprus ===
Player	Club(s)	Period
Fadel Brahami	AEP Paphos F.C.	2009
Sofyane Cherfa	AC Omonia, Alki Oroklini	2011–14, 2018–19
Rafik Djebbour	APOEL FC	2014–15
Boussad Houche	APEP F.C.	2005–06
Karim Mouzaoui	Apollon Limassol	2003–05
Bilal Hamdi	Alki Oroklini	2017–18
Mehdi Mostefa	Pafos FC	2017–18
Nordine Sam	Nea Salamina	2008, 2009
Chafik Tigroudja	Alki Oroklini	2017–18
El Hedi Belameiri	Alki Oroklini	2018–19

=== Denmark ===
Player	Club(s)	Period
Mehdi Guerrouad	Viborg FF	2003–05 (4/0)
Adda Djeziri	Vejle Boldklub, HB Køge	2008–09 (6/0), 2011–12 (4/0)

=== England ===
Player	Club(s)	Period
Rachid Harkouk	Queens Park Rangers, Notts County	1978–79, 1981–84
Mehdi Abeid	Newcastle United	2014–15
Nadir Belhadj	Portsmouth	2008–10
Djamel Belmadi	Manchester City	2002–03
Ali Benarbia	Manchester City	2002–03
Nabil Bentaleb	Tottenham Hotspur, Newcastle United	2013–17, 2020
Hamer Bouazza	Watford, Fulham	2006–08
Madjid Bougherra	Charlton Athletic	2006–07
Kamel Ghilas	Hull City	2009–10
Adlène Guedioura	Wolverhampton Wanderers, Crystal Palace, Watford, Middlesbrough	2009–12, 2013–15, 2015–16, 2017
Rafik Halliche	Fulham	2010–11
Riyad Mahrez	Leicester City, Manchester City	2014–18, 2018–23
Rachid Ghezzal	Leicester City	2018–21
Saïd Benrahma	West Ham United	2020–
Moussa Saïb	Tottenham Hotspur	1997–99
Sofiane Feghouli	West Ham United	2016–17
Islam Slimani	Leicester City, Newcastle United	2016–21, 2018
Rayan Aït-Nouri	Wolverhampton	2020–
Hassan Yebda	Portsmouth	2009–10

=== Finland ===
Player	Club(s)	Period
Mehdi Boukassi	Haka	2023 (4/0)
Farid Ghazi	HJK	2006–2007 (29/14)
Mohamed Khazerouni	Atlantis FC	2001 (6/1)
Mohamed Medjoudj	HJK	2007 (4/0)
Yacine Slatni	AC Oulu	2007 (2/0)
Kheireddine Zarabi	TPS	2007–2008 (25/0)
Boussad Houche	IFK Mariehamn	2010 (7/0)
Olivier Boumelaha	IFK Mariehamn	2005 (4/0)
Virgile Boumelaha	HJK	2005 (1/0)
Billal Zouani	Atlantis FC	2001 (9/2)

=== France ===
Player	Club(s)	Period
Radhouane Abbes	Montpellier HSC	1987–88 & 1989–90
Djamel Abdoun	AC Ajaccio, FC Nantes	2003–06, 2008–09
Boumediene Abderahmane	FC Sète, Olympique de Marseille	1945–49 & 1953–54, 1949–52
Madjid Adjaoud	CS Sedan	1999–03
Nassim Akrour	Troyes AC, Grenoble Foot	2002–03, 2008–10
Ridha Ali Messaoud	Paris SG	1976–77
Abdelkader Amar	Boulogne, Saint-Étienne, Nice	1938–39, 1940–47, 1947–48
Said Amara	RC Strasbourg, Béziers, Girondins de Bordeaux	1956–57, 1957–58, 1962–64
Salim Arrache	RC Strasbourg, Olympique de Marseille, Toulouse FC	2003–06, 2006–08, 2008
Mokhtar Arribi	Sète, Lens	1946–51 and 1952–54, 1954–55
Salah Assad	Mulhouse, Paris SG	1982–83, 1983–84
Louardi Badjika	Bastia	1981–82
Salah Bakour	SM Caen	2004–05
Nadjib Baouia	Evian	2012–13
Kaddour Bekhloufi	AS Monaco	1957–58
Hamid Belabbes	Stade Français	1966–67
Jacky Belabde	Chamois Niortais	1987–88
Rachid Belaid	Toulouse FC (1937), FC Nancy, Nice	1950–51, 1952–53, 1953–54
Omar Belbey	Montpellier	2001–02
Nadir Belhadj	Sedan, Lyon, Lens	2006–07, 2007–08, 2008
Tahar Belhadj	Le Havre	1946–47
Youssef Belkebla	Saint-Étienne	1986–88
Habib Bellaïd	Strasbourg, Boulogne	2005–06 & 2007–08, 2009–10
Djamel Belmadi	Paris SG, Marseille, Valenciennes	1995–96, 1999–02, 2007–09
Nordine Ben Ali	Bordeaux, US Le Mans, Stade Français, Le Havre, Colmar, Strasbourg, Monaco, Niort	1938–44, 1944–45, 1945–47, 1947–1948, 1948–49, 1949–50, 1950–51, 1957–60
Said Ben Arab	Bordeaux, Marseille, FC Sète, EF Bordeaux, AS Aix-en-Provence, AS Avignon, US Le Mans, AS Châteaudun	1937–39 and 1972–43 and 1949–51, 1939–41, 1941–42, 1943–44, 1945–46, 1946–48, 1948–49, 1956–57
Abdelkader Ben Bouali	SO Montpellier, Sète, Marseille, RC Paris, Toulouse	1933–35, 1935–36, 1936–38, 1938–39, 1939–40
Madjid Ben Haddou	Nice	2002–04
Ali Benarbia	Martigues, AS Monaco, Bordeaux, Paris SG	1993–95, 1995–98, 1998–99, 1999–01
Ali Ben Fadah	Alès, Angers	1957–59, 1959–60
Alim Ben Mabrouk	RC Paris, Bordeaux, Lyon	1984–85 and 1986–90, 1990–91, 1991–92
Ali Benouna	Sète, Stade Rennais, Boulogne, Roubaix, SO Montpellier	1930–36, 1936–38, 1937, 1938–39, 1939–40
Houcine Ben Said	Mulhouse	1982–83
Ben Samed	Stade Français	1949–50
Tedj Bensaoula	Le Havre	1985–86
Madani Ben Tahar	Lens	1964–68
Abdelhaziz Ben Tifour	Nice, Troyes, AS Monaco	1948–53, 1954–55, 1955–58
Mohamed Bernou	Montpellier	1948–50
Bensaad Bettahar	AS Monaco	1994–95
Yacine Bezzaz	Ajaccio, Valenciennes	2002–05, 2006–09
Ali Bouafia	Marseille, Lyon, Strasbourg, Lorient	1987–88, 1989–92, 1992–95, 1998–99
Hameur Bouazza	Arles-Avignon	2010–11
Abderrhamane Boubekeur	AS Monaco	1954–58
Hocine Bouchache	Le Havre	1958–61
Abdelhamid Bouchouk	Sète, Marseille, Toulouse FC	1948–49, 1949–51, 1953–58
Fouad Bouguerra	Nantes	2004–05
Sadek Boukhalfa	Nantes, Metz	1963–65, 1967–69
Virgile Boumelaha	Sochaux	2002–03
Mohamed Boumezrag	Valenciennes, SR Colmar, OFC Charleville, Red Star, Girondins de Bordeaux, Le Mans	1936–37, 1937–38 and 1945–46, 1938–39, 1939–40, 1940–41, 1941–45
Abdelmajid Bourebbou	Rouen, Laval	1977–78, 1978–83
Brahim Bourras	Rennes	1961–63
Mohamed Bourricha	Nîmes Olympique	1959–60
Boudjema Bourtal	Alès	1958–59
Mansour Boutabout	Sedan	2006–07
Mohamed Bradja	Troyes	1999–03
Mohamed Brahami	Le Havre	1999–00 and 2002–03
Said Brahimi	Toulouse FC	1955–58
Hacène Chabri	AS Monaco	1956–57
Fathi Chebel	AS Nancy, Metz, RC Paris	1975–79 and 1985–86, 1979–80, 1984–85
Embarek Chenen	Rouen	1960–62
Abdelmalek Cherrad	Nice, Bastia	2002–04, 2004–05
Abdelkader Chibani	Le Havre, CA Paris, USA Perpignan	1937–38, 1939–..., ...–47
Mustapha Dahleb	Sedan, Paris SG	1969–71 and 1973–74, 1974–84
Kouider Daho	Fives, Troyes, Sète, Toulouse, EF Toulouse, RC Franc-Comtois	1936, 1936–1938, 1938–39 and 1947–48, 1939–43 and 1944–45 and 1946–47, 1943–44, 1945–46
Darman Defnoun	Alès, Angers	1957–59, 1959–60 and 1962–64
Abdel Djaadaoui	Sochaux	1972–82
Salah Djebaili	Nîmes Olympique	1957–66
Habib Draoua	Le Havre	1937–45
Billel Dziri	Sedan	1999–00
Assassi Fellahi	Saint-Étienne	1953–56
Karim Fellahi	Saint-Étienne	2000–01
Kader Ferhaoui	Montpellier, Cannes, Saint-Étienne	1987–93 and 1996–98, 1993–96, 1999–2000
Said Ferrad	Troyes	1954–56
Brahim Ferradj	Brest	2010–13
Ahmed Firoud	Rennes, Nice	1945–46, 1948–53
Kader Firoud	Saint-Étienne, Nîmes Olympique	1945–48, 1950–54
Aissa Fouka	Toulouse FC	1987–90 and 1991–94
Rabah Gamouh	Nîmes Olympique	1977–81
Farid Ghazi	Troyes	1999–03
Kamel Ghilas	Arles-Avignon, Stade de Reims	2010–11, 2012–14
Souilem Gnaoui	Marseille, SC Fives, Nice, Red Star Olympique	1936, 1936–37, 1937–38, 1938–39
Aïssa Mandi	Stade de Reims	2012–2016
Said Hadad	Sète, Marseille, Toulouse FC	1946–49, 1949–51, 1953–56
Fodil Hadjadj	Nantes	2003–05
Riad Hammadou	Lille OSC	2001–02
Ziri Hammar	AS Nancy	2010–13
Said Hamimi	Brest	1981–82
Salem Harcheche	Saint-Étienne	1991–96
Brahim Hemdani	Cannes, Strasbourg, Marseille	1997–98, 1998–01, 2001–05
Abderrahman Ibrir	Bordeaux, Toulouse FC, Marseille	1946–47, 1947–51, 1951–53
Kamel Kaci-Said	Cannes	1997–98
Foued Kadir	Valenciennes>, Marseille	2009–13, 2013–15
Karim Kerkar	Le Havre	1998–00
Abdelhamid Kermali	Lyon	1955–58
Abdelkrim Kerroum	Troyes	1960–61
Mahi Khennane	Rennes, Toulouse FC, Nîmes Olympique	1956–57 and 1958–62, 1962–65, 1965–66
Amar Kodja	Nantes	1955–56
Nourredine Kourichi	Valenciennes, Bordeaux, Lille OSC	1976–81, 1981–82, 1982–86
Nasreddine Kraouche	Metz	1998–99
Lamri Laachi	Paris FC, RC Paris	1973–74 and 1978–79, 1984–85
Kamel Larbi	Nice	2003–05 and 2006–2008
Mohammed Lekkak	Toulouse FC, Rouen, Lyon, Angoulême	1958–59 and 1962–63 and 1964–65, 1965–67, 1967–69, 1969–70
Abdallah Liegeon	AS Monaco, Strasbourg	1981–87, 1988–89
Amine Linganzi	Saint-Étienne	2008–09
Rabah Madjer	RC Paris	1984–85
Mamar Mamouni	Le Havre	1996–99
Faouzi Mansouri	Nîmes Olympique, Montpellier	1974–80, 1981–82
Yazid Mansouri	Le Havre, Lorient	1997–00 and 2002–03, 2006–2010
Mohamed Maouche	Reims	1956–58 and 1960–61
Karim Maroc	Lyon, Angers, Tours, Brest	1976–79 and 1980–81, 1979–80, 1981–82, 1982–85
Kader Mazzouz	Nîmes Olympique	1957–58
Mohamed Medehbi	Limoges	1960–61
Carl Medjani	Metz, Lorient, Ajaccio, Valenciennes	2005–06, 2006–07, 2011–13, 2014
Aoued Meflah	SC Fives, Olympique Alès, Stade Rennais UC, Olympique Antibes	1929–34, 1934–36, 1936–38 and 1940–47, 1938–40
Abderahmane Meftah	Toulouse FC, Toulon	1954–55, 1959–60
Mourad Meghni	Sochaux	2005–06
Rachid Mekhloufi	Saint-Étienne, Bastia	1954–58 and 1963–68, 1968–70
Mehdi Méniri	AS Nancy, Troyes, Metz	1997 and 1998–00, 2000–03, 2003–06
Mohamed Mezarra	Lille OSC	1964–68
Rafik Mezriche	Strasbourg	1997–02
Ahmed Mihoubi	Sète, Toulouse FC, Olympique Lyonnais	1946–53, 1953–54, 1954–55
Rachid Natouri	Metz	1970–72
Omar Nekkache	Marseille	1950–52
Mohamed "Ahmed" Nemeur	Le Havre, Bordeaux, EF Bordeaux, Saint-Étienne, Nice, Lens, Cannes	1936–39, 1942–43, 1943–44, 1944–45, 1945–46, 1946–47, 1947–48, 1948–49, 1949–50
Abdelhakim Omrani	RC Lens	2010–11
Abdelnacer Ouadah	AS Nancy, Ajaccio, FC Metz, CS Sedan	1998–00, 2002–05, 2005–06, 2006–07
Amokrane Oualiken	Nîmes Olympique	1958–60
Ahmed Oudjani	RC Lens, CS Sedan	1958–60 and 1962–65, 1966–67
Chérif Oudjani	RC Lens, Laval, FC Sochaux	1983–85 and 1986–89, 1985–86, 1989–90
Abderrahmane Rabiah	Le Havre, CA Paris, USA Perpignan	1937–...
Amar Rouaï	Angers	1957–58 and 1962–63
Hakim Saci	EA Guingamp, FC Metz	2001–03, 2003–04
Moussa Saïb	Auxerre, AS Monaco, FC Lorient	1992–97 and 2000–2001, 2001, 2001–02
Rafik Saïfi	Troyes AC, FC Istres, AC Ajaccio, FC Lorient	1999–03, 2004–05, 2005–06, 2006–09
Mohamed Salem	CS Sedan	1960–64 and 1967–71
Youssef Salimi	OGC Nice	1994–97
Nordine Sam	Strasbourg	2002–03
Liazid Sandjak	Paris SG, OGC Nice, Saint-Étienne	1986–92, 1994–95, 1995–96
Max Sellal	FC Nancy	1949–51
Abdelhamid Skander	FC Bordeaux	1954–56
Abderrahmane Soukhane	Toulouse FC, Red Star	1964–67, 1967–68
Abdelhafid Tasfaout	Auxerre, EA Guingamp	1995–97,1997–98 and 2000–02
Mohamed Tayeb	FC Bordeaux	1963–65 and 1966–67
Djamel Tlemçani	FC Rouen, Toulon	1982–84, 1984–85
Ali Sami Yachir	Montpellier	2003–04
Anthar Yahia	Bastia, OGC Nice	2001–05, 2005–06
Hassan Yebda	Le Mans	2006–08
Abderraouf Zarabi	Ajaccio	2003–04
Karim Ziani	Troyes, Sochaux, Marseille	2001–03, 2006–07, 2007–09
Mustapha Zitouni	AS Monaco	1954–58
Abdelhamid Zouba	Nîmes Olympique	1963–64
Mehdi Mostefa	Ajaccio, Lorient, Bastia	2011–14, 2014–15, 2015–17
Walid Mesloub	FC Lorient	2014–17
Raïs M'Bolhi	Stade Rennais	2017
Youcef Belaïli	Angers SCO	2017–18
Saïd Benrahma	OGC Nice, Angers SCO	2013–2017, 2016
Rachid Ghezzal	Olympique Lyonnais, AS Monaco	2012–17, 2017–18
Mehdi Tahrat	Angers SCO	2016–18
Fethi Harek	Bastia, Nîmes	2012–2014, 2018–19
Ramy Bensebaini	Montpellier HSC, Stade Rennais	2015–16, 2016–19
Ryad Boudebouz	Sochaux, Bastia, Montpellier, AS Saint-Étienne	2008–13, 2013–15, 2015–17, 2019–22
Idriss Saadi	Saint-Étienne, Strasbourg	2010–14, 2017–21
Mehdi Zeffane	Olympique Lyonnais, Stade Rennais	2012–15, 2015–19
Yassine Benzia	Olympique Lyonnais, Lille OSC, Dijon FCO	2012–15, 2015–20, 2020–
Mehdi Abeid	Dijon FCO, Nantes	2016–19, 2019–21
Zinedine Ferhat	Nîmes	2019–21
Farid Boulaya	Metz	2019–22
Haris Belkebla	Brest	2019–
Andy Delort	Ajaccio, Caen, Toulouse, Montpellier, Nice	2011–12 & 2012–13, 2015–16, 2016–18, 2018–21, 2021–
Youcef Attal	OGC Nice	2018–
Hicham Boudaoui	OGC Nice	2019–
Islam Slimani	AS Monaco, Olympique Lyonnais, Brest	2019–20, 2020–21, 2022–
Adam Ounas	FC Bordeaux, OGC Nice	2015–17, 2019–20
Alexandre Oukidja	Strasbourg, Metz	2017–18, 2019–22
Djamel Benlamri	Olympique Lyonnais	2020–21
Karim Aribi	Nîmes	2020–21
Yacine Brahimi	Rennes	2010–12
Mourad Meghni	FC Sochaux	2005–06
Rayan Aït-Nouri	Angers	2017–20
Yassine Benzia	Lyon, Lille	2011–15, 2015–18

=== Germany ===
Player	Club(s)	Period
Chadli Amri	Mainz 05, 1. FC Kaiserslautern	2006–07, 2009–11
Habib Bellaïd	Eintracht Frankfurt	2008–09
Abder Ramdane	Hansa Rostock, SC Freiburg	1998–02
Nabil Bentaleb	Schalke 04	2016–21
Ishak Belfodil	Werder Bremen, 1899 Hoffenheim	2017–18, 2018–21
Ramy Bensebaini	Borussia Mönchengladbach, Borussia Dortmund	2019–23, 2023–
Farès Chaïbi	Eintracht Frankfurt	2023–
Ahmed Reda Madouni	Borussia Dortmund, Bayer Leverkusen	2001–07
Karim Matmour	Borussia M'gladbach, Eintracht Frankfurt	2008–11, 2012–13
Idir Ouali	SC Paderborn	2014–15
Salim Djefaflia	Hannover 96	2003–04
Soufian Benyamina	VfB Stuttgart	2012–13
Antar Yahia	VfL Bochum, 1. FC Kaiserslautern	2006–10, 2011–12
Mounir Bouziane	Mainz 05	2016–17
Karim Ziani	VfL Wolfsburg	2009–11

=== Greece ===
Player	Club(s)	Period
Rafik Djebbour	Atromitos, Panionios, AEK Athens, Olympiacos	2005–06, 2007–08, 2008–10 and 2015–16, 2011–13
Karim Soltani	Iraklis, Skoda Xanthi, PAS Giannina	2010–12, 2013–17, 2017–18
Samy Frioui	AEL Larissa	2018
Aymen Tahar	Panetolikos	2019–
Gianni Seraf	Panionios	2018–
El Arbi Hillel Soudani	Olympiacos	2019–21
Yassine Benzia	Olympiacos	2019
Djamel Abdoun	Kavala, Olympiacos, Veria	2010–11, 2011–13, 2015–16
Karim Mouzaoui	Panionios, Apollon Kalamarias, Veria	2001–2003, 2004–2006, 2007–2008
Carl Medjani	Olympiacos	2013
Riad Hammadou	PAS Giannina	2002–2003
Yacine Hadji	Veria	2016–2017
Laurent Agouazi	Panthrakikos	2014–15
Mansour Boutabout	Ionikos	2000–2001
Youssef Salimi	Ethnikos Asteras	1999–2000
Mehdi Abeid	Panathinaikos	2013–14, 2015–16
Mohamed Chalali	Panionios	2010–11
Sofyane Cherfa	Panthrakikos	2008–12, 2014–15
Salim Arrache	PAS Giannina, Asteras Tripolis, AEL Kalloni	2010, 2010–11, 2015
Ismaël Bouzid	PAS Giannina	2010–11
Antar Yahia	Platanias	2014

=== Georgia ===
Player	Club(s)	Period
Abdel Jalil Medioub	Dinamo Tbilisi	2019

=== Hungary ===
Player	Club(s)	Period
Karim Benounes	Vasas SC	2009–11
Fouad Bouguerra	Nyíregyháza Spartacus, Győri ETO	2009–10, 2010–11
Nacim Abdelali	Nyíregyháza Spartacus	2010–12
Meziane Touati	Ferencváros, Budapest Honvéd	1996–1998
Naçer Bouiche	Ferencváros	1990–1991
Badis Lebbihi	Kaposvár	2013–14
Mohamed Mezghrani	Budapest Honvéd	2019–

=== Iceland ===
Player	Club(s)	Period
Yacine Si Salem	Knattspyrnudeild	2011–12

=== Italy ===
Player	Club(s)	Period
Ishak Belfodil	Bologna, Parma, Internazionale, Livorno	2012, 2012–13 and 2014–15, 2013–14, 2014, 2014–15
Samir Beloufa	Milan	1997–99
Abdelkader Ghezzal	Siena, Bari, Cesena, Parma	2008–10, 2010–11, 2011–12, 2014–15
Mohamed Fares	Verona, SPAL, Lazio	2014–16 & 2017–18, 2018–20, 2020–
Faouzi Ghoulam	Napoli	2013–
Ismaël Bennacer	Empoli, Milan	2018–19, 2019–
Mourad Meghni	Bologna, Lazio	2002–05, 2007–10
Djamel Mesbah	Lecce, Milan, Parma, Livorno, Sampdoria, Crotone	2010–12, 2012, 2013–14, 2014, 2014–16, 2016–17
Saphir Taïder	Bologna, Internazionale, Sassuolo	2011–13 and 2015–18, 2013–15, 2014–15
Adam Ounas	Napoli, Cagliari, Crotone	2017–, 2020, 2021
Hassan Yebda	Napoli, Udinese	2010–11, 2014

=== Kosovo ===
Player	Club(s)	Period
Yacine Si Salem	Besa Pejë	2017

=== Luxembourg ===
Player	Club(s)	Period
Ismaël Bouzid	Progrès Niederkorn	2014–17
Mehdi Ouamri	F91 Dudelange	2019–
Chadli Amri	FC Differdange 03	2017–18
Samir Louadj	F91 Dudelange, CS Grevenmacher	2007–09 & 2013–14, 2010–13
Salim Djefaflia	Racing FC	2002–03
Mehdi Makhloufi	CS Grevenmacher	2008–09
Malik Benachour	CS Grevenmacher, Swift Hesperange	2002–03 & 2006–07, 2007–08
Azouz Benlaouira	FC Avenir Beggen	2003–06
Fawzi Habili	FC Avenir Beggen	2003–06
Mehdi Amzal	FC Mamer 32	2006–07
Gaël Hug	F91 Dudelange, Racing FC, CS Grevenmacher	2003–09 & 2012–14, 2009–12
Mourad Boukellal	CS Pétange	2006–08 & 2010–12
Samir Sidi Mammar	Rumelange	2013–14
Rachid Ramdani	Racing FC	2017–18
Abdelghani Amrane	FC Jeunesse Canach	2010–11
Mustapha Cheriak	Wiltz	2015–16
Mounir Djaafri	Swift Hesperange	2009–10
Samir Meriem	CS Grevenmacher	2009–10
Cherit Hamza	CS Grevenmacher	2012–13
Hachem Mihoubi	Jeunesse Esch	2013–15
Joris Belgacem	RM Hamm Benfica	2016–17
Abdellah Bettahar	RM Hamm Benfica	2007–11
Mehdi Kirch	CS Fola Esch	2012–
Ahmed Benhemine	Mondorf-les-Bains	2015–
Sofiane Kheyari	CS Pétange	2017–
Mahédine Mouzaoui	US Hostert	2017–2018
Redha Boukharouba	Racing FC	2002–04
Mouloud Beltitane	US Hostert	2011–12
Aissam Hamdaoui	FC Avenir Beggen, Swift Hesperange	2002–04, 2004–05
Karim Zamoum	UN Käerjéng 97	2005–08
Omar Nekaa	FC Avenir Beggen	2003–05
Toufik Benslimane	US Esch	2017–
Amine Hammouni	Racing FC	2009–10
Kader Mekhtoub	Mondercange	2009–10
Karim Groune	CS Grevenmacher, FC Avenir Beggen, FC Differdange 03	2002–05, 2005–06, 2006–07
Rachid Benmerieme	Racing FC Union Luxembourg, CS Pétange	2004–05, 2007–08
Hakim Menaï	Progrès Niederkorn, Rodange	2012–17, 2017–
Laurent Agouazi	Racing FC	2018–
Djilali Kehal	RM Hamm Benfica	2007–2014
Mehdi Bousbaa	Racing FC	2013–14
Karim Djellal	Racing FC	2010–14
Ridha Lahoussine	Racing FC	2015–16
Mabrouk Dousen	Racing FC	2002–03
Slimane Birrou	FC Avenir Beggen	2005–06
Steven Hamdi	Mondorf-les-Bains	2014–15
Ahmed Rani	FC Avenir Beggen, Racing FC Union Luxembourg, CS Fola Esch, Mondorf-les-Bains, US Esch	2008, 2009–11, 2012–15 & 2015–16, 2016–17, 2017–18
Ilies Haddadji	F91 Dudelange, Mondorf-les-Bains	2012–14, 2014–
Ahmed Cherif	RM Hamm Benfica	2016–
Samir Imessad	UN Käerjéng	2009–10
Samy Sebaa	Sporting Club Steinfort	2008–09
Nouar Benlaribi	CS Grevenmacher	2006–08
Djillali Bekaddour	Rumelange	2005–06
Sifeddine Khemici	UN Käerjéng	2016–17
Idir Mokrani	Union 05 Kayl-Tétange, Racing FC, Rumelange, RM Hamm Benfica	2011–13, 2015–16, 2016–17, 2017–

=== Lithuania ===
Player	Club(s)	Period
Tayeb Meziani	Stumbras	2018
Walid Khadraoui	Atlantas	2012
Nasser Rahab	Kruoja	2013

=== Macedonia ===
Player	Club(s)	Period
Walid Hamidi	KF Shkupi	2021–
Zakaria Nimani	Metalurg Skopje	2015–16

=== Malta ===
Player	Club(s)	Period
Mohammed Belhadj	Naxxar Lions	2018
Djilali Belhadj	Naxxar Lions	2018

=== Netherlands ===
Player	Club(s)	Period
Paul Amara	DWS	1960–61
Karim Bridji	FC Volendam, Heracles, RKC Waalwijk	2003–04, 2006–09, 2011–12
Youssef Sofiane	Roda	2004–05
Rheda Djellal	Excelsior	2011–12
Oussama Darfalou	Vitesse, VVV-Venlo, PEC Zwolle	2018-, 2020, 2022
Ramiz Zerrouki	Twente, Feyenoord	2019–22, 2022–
Anis Hadj Moussa	Vitesse, Feyenoord	2024, 2024–
Ahmed Touba	RKC Waalwijk	2020-22
Karim Soltani	VVV, ADO	2007–08, 2008–10

=== Northern Ireland ===
Player	Club(s)	Period
Hocine Yahi	Linfield	1990–91
Gianni Seraf	Derry City	2019–

=== Norway ===
Player	Club(s)	Period
Habib Bellaïd	Sarpsborg 08	2015–16
Redouane Drici	Brann	1984, 1987–91

=== Poland ===
Player	Club(s)	Period
Mohammed Rahoui	Lechia Gdańsk	2013

=== Portugal ===
Player	Club(s)	Period
Yacine Brahimi	FC Porto	2014–19
Abdelmalek Cherrad	CS Marítimo	2009–11
Karim Fellahi	GD Estoril-Praia	2003–05
Kamel Ghilas	Vitória Guimarães	2006–08
Nabil Ghilas	Moreirense, FC Porto	2012–13, 2013–14
Rafik Halliche	CD Nacional, Académica, Estoril, Moreirense	2008–10, 2012–14, 2017–18, 2018–20
Youssef Haraoui	GD Chaves	1992–93
Mehdi Kerrouche	Naval	2009–10
Rabah Madjer	FC Porto	1985–91
Hakim Medane	FC Famalicão, SC Salgueiros	1991–94, 1995–96, 1994–95
Djamel Menad	FC Famalicão, Belenenses	1990–92, 1992–93
Islam Slimani	Sporting CP	2013–16 & 2022
Hillel Soudani	Vitória Guimarães	2011–13
Hassan Yebda	Benfica, Belenenses	2008–09, 2016–18
Kheireddine Zarabi	Belenenses, Vitória Setúbal	2008–09, 2009–11
Nassim Zitouni	Vitória Guimarães	2014–15
Aymen Tahar	Boavista	2016, 2017–19
Zakaria Naidji	Gil Vicente	2019–20
Hicham Belkaroui	Nacional, Moreirense	2016, 2017–18
Okacha Hamzaoui	Nacional	2016–17
Billal Sebaihi	Estoril, Tondela	2015–16, 2016
Bilel Aouacheria	Moreirense, Farense, Gil Vicente	2018–20, 2020–21, 2021–
Yanis Hamache	Boavista	2020–22

=== Romania ===
Player	Club(s)	Period
Najib Ammari	CFR Cluj, FC Dunărea Călărași, Viitorul Constanța	2014, 2019, 2019
Jugurtha Hamroun	Oţelul, Steaua	2015, 2015–17
Aymen Tahar	Gaz Metan Mediaş, Steaua	2012–15 & 2017–, 2015–16
Rachid Bouhenna	CFR Cluj, Steaua	2020–22, 2022
Billel Omrani	CFR Cluj, Steaua	2016–22, 2022–
Liassine Cadamuro	Concordia Chiajna	2019
Rachid Aït-Atmane	Dinamo București	2018–19
Aziz Tafer	FC Gloria Buzău	2008
Mourad Satli	FC Petrolul Ploiești	2014–15
Réda Rabeï	SC Juventus București	2017–
Karim Boutadjine	CS Pandurii Târgu Jiu, FC Universitatea Cluj	2013–15
Karim Ziani	FC Petrolul Ploiești	2016

=== Russia ===
Player	Club(s)	Period
Sofiane Hanni	Spartak Moscow	2018–19
Mehdi Zeffane	FC Krylia Sovetov Samara	2020
Raïs M'Bolhi	FC Krylia Sovetov Samara	2011

=== Scotland ===
Player	Club(s)	Period
Mehdi Abeid	St Johnstone	2013
Madjid Bougherra	Rangers	2008–11
Ismaël Bouzid	Heart of Midlothian, Kilmarnock	2009–11, 2013–14
Mohamed Chalali	Aberdeen	2011–12
Rachid Djebaili	St Johnstone	2001–02
Brahim Hemdani	Rangers	2005–09
Khaled Kemas	Dundee, Motherwell	2001–03
Karim Kerkar	Dundee United	2004–05
Abderraouf Zarabi	Hibernian	2008
Toufik Zerara	Falkirk	2009–2010

=== Slovenia ===
Player	Club(s)	Period
Hillal Soudani	NK Maribor	2023–

=== Slovakia ===
Player	Club(s)	Period
Samy Derras	FC Spartak Trnava	2012–13
Sofian El Moudane	FK Senica	2019–
Youssef Haraoui	ŠK Slovan Bratislava	1991–93

=== Spain ===
Player	Club(s)	Period
Rachid Aït-Atmane	Sporting	2015–17
Djamel Belmadi	Celta	1999–00
Yacine Brahimi	Granada	2012–14
Liassine Cadamuro-Bentaïba	Real Sociedad	2011–14
Sofiane Feghouli	Valencia, Almería	2010–16
Abdelkader Ghezzal	Levante	2011–12
Nabil Ghilas	Córdoba, Levante	2014–16
Foued Kadir	Betis	2015–16
Aïssa Mandi	Betis, Villarreal CF	2016–21, 2021–
Ryad Boudebouz	Betis, Celta'	2017–19, 2019
Mehdi Lacen	Alavés, Racing, Getafe, Malaga	2005–06, 2008–11, 2011–16 & 2017–18, 2018
Rabah Madjer	Valencia	1987–88
Icham Mouissi	Racing	2002–03
Moussa Saïb	Valencia	1997–98
Hassan Yebda	Granada	2011–14
Farid Boulaya	Girona	2017
Carl Medjani	Levante, Leganés	2016, 2016

=== Sweden ===
Player	Club(s)	Period
Dalil Benyahia	Brommapojkarna	2009, 2010
Samir Beloufa	Helsingborg	2007

=== Switzerland ===
Player	Club(s)	Period
Hocine Achiou	FC Aarau	2006–07
Lakhdar Adjali	FC Sion	1998–99
Kaled Gourmi	BSC Young Boys	2009–10
Olivier Boumelaha	FC St. Gallen	2000–01, 2002–03
Yacine Hima	FC Aarau, AC Bellinzona	2007, 2008–10
Liazid Sandjak	Neuchâtel Xamax	1996–98
Nordine Sam	FC Luzern	2006–07
Djamel Mesbah	Servette, Basel, FC Aarau, Luzern, Lausanne-Sport	2003–04, 2004–06, 2006–07, 2008–09, 2017
Rachid Mekhloufi	Servette	1961–62
Hemza Mihoubi	AC Bellinzona	2009–11
Jaouen Hadjam	Young Boys	2024–
Mohamed Amoura	FC Lugano	2021–23
Ayoub Abdellaoui	FC Sion	2018–21

=== Turkey ===
Player	Club(s)	Period
Djamel Amani	Aydınspor	1990–93
Khelifa Belaouchet	Aydınspor	1990–91
Tahar Cherif El Ouazani	Aydınspor	1990–92
Noureddine Negazzi	Aydınspor	1991–92
Kamel Kadri	Aydınspor	1992–93
Khaled Lounici	Aydınspor	1992–93
Youssef Haraoui	Karabükspor, Bursaspor, Karşıyaka	1993–94, 1994–95, 1995–96
Fayçal Badji	Erzurumspor	1998–99
Tarek Lazizi	Gençlerbirliği	1998–99
Hamid Merakchi	Gençlerbirliği	1998–00
Rachid Djebaili	Göztepe	2002–03
Ismaël Bouzid	Galatasaray, MKE Ankaragücü	2007–08, 2008–09
Mohamed Dahmane	Bucaspor	2010–11
Karim Ziani	Kayserispor	2011
Jugurtha Hamroun	Karabükspor	2012–14
Rafik Djebbour	Sivasspor	2013
Essaïd Belkalem	Trabzonspor	2014–15
Carl Medjani	Trabzonspor, Sivasspor	2014–15 & 2017, 2017–18
Nabil Ghilas	Gaziantep BB, Göztepe	2016–17, 2017–19
Sofiane Feghouli	Galatasaray	2017–22
Rachid Ghezzal	Beşiktaş	2020–
Houssam Ghacha	Antalyaspor	2021–
Ahmed Touba	İstanbul Başakşehir	2022-
Islam Slimani	Fenerbahçe	2018–19
Yassine Benzia	Fenerbahçe	2018–19
Raïs M'Bolhi	Antalyaspor	2015–16

=== Ukraine ===
Player	Club(s)	Period
Adel Gafaiti	FC Zirka Kropyvnytskyi	2018
Yanis Hamache	SC Dnipro-1	2022–

== List All-time top appearances in european League ==
List of Algerian players with 200 or more appearances in European League top level
R.	Player	European Club(s)	Apps (Note: Playoffs games don't count.)
1	Ryad Boudebouz	(France) Sochaux (164) – Bastia (66) – Montpellier (71) – Saint-Étienne (68) – Betis (35) – (Spain) Celta (11)	415
2	Aïssa Mandi	(France) Stade de Reims (123) – Lille (53) – (Spain) Real Betis (152) – Villarreal CF (54)	382
3	Sofiane Feghouli	(France) Grenoble (31) – (Spain) Almería (9) – Valencia (149) – (England) West Ham United (21) – (Turkey) Galatasaray (126) – Karagümrük (34)	370
4	Rachid Mekhloufi	(France) AS Saint-Étienne (274) – SC Bastia (67) – (Switzerland) Servette FC (19)	360
5	Abdelkader Ferhaoui	(France) Montpellier HSC (229) – AS Cannes (94) – AS Saint-Étienne (20)	343
6	Mustapha Dahleb	(France) CS Sedan (30) – Paris SG (291)	321
7	Mohamed Salem	(France) CS Sedan (237) – (Belgium) Daring de Bruxelles (71)	308
8	Abdel Djaadaoui	(France) FC Sochaux (307)	307
9	**Ramy Bensebaini**	(Belgium) Lierse (23) – (France) Montpellier (22) – Rennes (79) – (Germany) Mönchengladbach (95) – **Borussia Dortmund** (69)	288
10	Rachid Ghezzal	(France) Lyon (97) – Monaco (26) – (England) Leicester (19) – (Italy) Fiorentina (19) – (Turkey) Beşiktaş (104) – Çaykur Rizespor (23)	288
11	Riyad Mahrez	(England) Leicester City (139) – Manchester City (145)	284
12	Hillel Soudani	(Portugal) Vitória de Guimarães (37) – (Croatia) Dinamo Zagreb (132) – (Greece) Olympiacos (24) – (Slovenia) Maribor (85)	278
13	Medhi Lacen	(Spain) Deportivo Alavés (19) – Racing Santander (100) – Getafe CF (139) – Malaga CF (15)	273
14	Faouzi Ghoulam	(France) Saint-Étienne (87) – Angers (7) – (Italy) Napoli (168)} – (Turkey) Hatayspor (21)	272
15	Andy Delort	(France) Ajaccio (23) – Caen (36) – Toulouse (47) – Montpellier (104) – OGC Nice (46) – Nantes (12)	268
16	Rafik Saïfi	(France) Troyes AC (110) – FC Istres (35) – AC Ajaccio (26) – FC Lorient (95)	266
17	Islam Slimani	(Portugal) Sporting CP (91) – (England) Leicester City (35) – Newcastle United (4) – (Turkey) Fenerbahçe (15) – (France) Monaco (18) – Olympique Lyonnais (30) – Brest (16) – (Belgium) Anderlecht (10) – Mechelen (13) – Westerlo (18) – (Romania) CFR Cluj (14)	264
18	Karim Soltani	(Netherlands) VVV-Venlo (28) – ADO Den Haag (59) – (Greece) Iraklis (23) – Aris (15) – Skoda Xanthi (113) – PAS Giannina (15)	253
19	**Nabil Bentaleb**	(England) Tottenham Hotspur (46) – Newcastle United (11) – (Germany) Schalke 04 (82) – (France) Angers (48) – **Lille** (62)	249
19	Yacine Brahimi	(France) Stade rennais (39) – (Spain) Granada CF (62) – (Portugal) FC Porto (148)	249
20	Rafik Djebbour	(Greece) Louviéroise (21) – Atromitos (14) – Panionios (41) – AEK Athens (80) – Olympiacos (56) – (Turkey) Sivasspor (10) – (Cyprus) APOEL (26)	248
21	Brahim Hemdani	(France) AS Cannes (20) – RC Strasbourg (53) – Olympique de Marseille (95) – (Scotland) Rangers (67)	246
=	Abdelaziz Ben Tifour	(France) OGC Nice (129) – Troyes AC (31) – AS Monaco (86)	246
23	Ali Benarbia	(France) FC Martigues (65) – AS Monaco (90) – Girondins de Bordeaux (25) – Paris SG (42) – (England) Manchester City (33)	245
24	Ishak Belfodil	(France) Lyon (10) – (Italy) Bologna (8) – Parma (56) – Inter (8) – Livorno (17) – (Belgium) Liège (28) – (Germany) Bremen (26) – Hoffenheim (47) – Hertha (26) – (Azerbaijan) Sabah (18)	244
25	Mahi Khennane	(France) Stade Rennais (164) – Toulouse FC (61) – Nîmes Olympique (15)	240
26	Nourredine Kourichi	(France) US Valenciennes (109) – Girondins de Bordeaux (22) – Lille OSC (94)	225
27	Ali Bouafia	(France) Olympique de Marseille (12) – Olympique Lyonnais (94) – RC Strasbourg (92) – FC Lorient (25)	223
28	Antar Yahia	(France) SC Bastia (77) – OGC Nice (30) – (Germany) VfL Bochum (91) – 1. FC Kaiserslautern (11) – (Greece) Platanias (11)	220
29	Chérif Oudjani	(France) RC Lens (100) – Stade Lavallois (31) – FC Sochaux (69) – RC Paris (18)	218
30	Carl Medjani	(France) Metz (22) – Lorient (9) – Ajaccio (54) – Valenciennes (16) – (Greece) Olympiacos (4) – (Turkey) Trabzonspor (50) – Sivasspor (37) – (Spain) Levante (14) – Leganés (8)	214
31	Ahmed Rani	Avenir Beggen (10) – Union Luxembourg (63) – Fola Esch (86) – Mondorf-les-Bains (15) – Esch (21) – Blue Boys Muhlenbach (17)	212
=	Moussa Saïb	(France) AJ Auxerre (170) – AS Monaco (7) – FC Lorient (8) – (England) Tottenham Hotspur (13) – (Spain) Valencia CF (14)	212
33	Karim Maroc	(France) Olympique Lyonnais (54) – Angers SCO (32) – Tours FC (32) – Stade Brestois (88)	211
34	Mehdi Mostefa	(France) Ajaccio (101) – Lorient (24) – Bastia (56) – Pafos (26)	207
=	**Ismaël Bennacer**	(Italy) Empoli (37) – Milan (137) – (France) Marseille (12) – (France) **Dinamo Zagreb** (18)	204
36	Djamel Mesbah	(Switzerland) Servette (11) – Basel (11) – Aarau (60) – Luzern (6) – Lausanne (4) – (Italy) Lecce (46) – Milan (9) – Parma (10) – Livorno (14) – Sampdoria (23) – Crotone (10)	204
37	Billel Omrani	(France) Marseille (6) – (Romania) CFR Cluj (164) – FCSB (22) – Petrolul Ploiești (5) – FC Politehnica Iași (3) – (Poland) Wisła Kraków (2)	202
38	Fadel Brahami	(France) Le Havre AC (12) – (Belgium) Louviéroise (47) – Mons (86) – (Greece) AEP Paphos FC (14) – (Bulgaria) Minyor Pernik (42)	201
=	Mehdi Abeid	(Scotland) St Johnstone (12) – (Greece) Panathinaikos (61) – (England) Newcastle United (13) – (France) Dijon (73) – Nantes (43)	201
=	Aymen Tahar	(Romania) Gaz Metan Mediaș (104) – Steaua București (15) – (Portugal) Boavista (30) – (Greece) Panetolikos (51)	200
(Italics denotes players still playing professional football; **Bold** denotes players still playing in the European League)

Correct as of 1 June 2026 (UTC)

== List of all-time top goalscorers in european Leagues ==
List of Algerian players with 50 or more goals
R.	Player	European Leagues Club(s)	Goals
1	Rachid Mekhloufi	(France) AS Saint-Étienne (123) – SC Bastia (20) – (Switzerland) Servette FC (13)	156
2	Hillel Soudani	(Portugal) Vitória de Guimarães (13) – (Croatia) Dinamo Zagreb (68) – (Greece) Olympiacos (9) – (Slovenia) Maribor (32)	122
3	Rafik Djebbour	(Belgium) Louviéroise (6) – (Greece) Atromitos (6) – Panionios (19) – AEK Athens (24) – Olympiacos (39) – (Turkey) Sivasspor (2) – (Cyprus) APOEL (14)	110
4	Mohamed Salem	(France) CS Sedan (83) – (Belgium) Daring de Bruxelles (21)	104
5	Mustapha Dahleb	(France) CS Sedan (17) – Paris SG (85)	102
6	Mahi Khennane	(France) Stade Rennais (61) – Toulouse FC (31) – Nîmes Olympique (6)	98
7	Ahmed Oudjani	(France) RC Lens (94) – CS Sedan (1)	95
8	Islam Slimani	(Portugal) Sporting (52) – (England) Leicester (8) – (Turkey) Fenerbahçe (1) – (France) Monaco (9) – Lyon (4) – Brest (1) – (Belgium) Anderlecht (8) – Mechelen (3) – Westerlo (2) – (Romania) CFR Cluj (1)	89
9	Andy Delort	(France) Ajaccio (1) – Caen (12) – Toulouse (10) – Montpellier (40) – OGC Nice (22)	85
10	Riyad Mahrez	(England) Leicester City (39) – Manchester City (43)	82
11	Chérif Oudjani	(France) RC Lens (39) – Stade Lavallois (14) – FC Sochaux (13) – RC Paris (7)	73
12	Amine Gouiri	(France) OGC Nice (22) – Stade Rennais (25) – Marseille (24)	71
13	Rabah Madjer	(France) Racing Paris (3) – Tours FC (2) – (Portugal) FC Porto (50) – (Spain) Valencia CF (4)	59
14	Abdelaziz Ben Tifour	(France) OGC Nice (34) – Troyes AC (9) – AS Monaco (13)	56
15	Ryad Boudebouz	(France) FC Sochaux (24) – SC Bastia (8) – Montpellier HSC (13) – Saint-Étienne (4) – Betis (2) – (Spain) Celta (1)	52
16	Sofiane Feghouli	(Spain) Almería (2) – Valencia (20) – (England) West Ham United (3) – (Turkey) Galatasaray (25) – Fatih Karagümrük (2)	52
=	Yacine Brahimi	(France) Stade rennais (6) – (Spain) Granada CF (3) – (Portugal) FC Porto (41)	50
(Italics denotes players still playing professional football; **Bold** denotes players still playing in the European League)

As of 1 June 2026

== Algerian players and European Competitions ==
Bold Still playing competitive football in Europe

List of Algerian players with 25 or more appearances in European competitions
#	Name	Games					Date of debut	Debut against	Date of last match	Final match against
#	Name	C1	C2^{1}	C3	SC	TOTAL	Date of debut	Debut against	Date of last match	Final match against
1	Sofiane Feghouli	31	–	35	–	66	7 Dec 2010	Manchester United	10 Mar 2022	FC Barcelona
2	Riyad Mahrez	55	–	–	–	55	14 Sep 2016	Club Brugge	10 Jun 2023	Inter Milan
3	Hillel Soudani	36	1	16	–	53	25 Aug 2011	Atlético Madrid	11 Jul 2023	Botev Plovdiv
4	Brahim Hemdani	22	–	28	–	50	13 Aug 2003	Austria Wien	14 May 2008	Zenit Saint Petersburg
5	Faouzi Ghoulam	16	–	29	–	45	27 Feb 2014	Swansea City	24 Feb 2022	FC Barcelona
6	Yacine Brahimi	37	–	7	–	44	28 Jul 2011	Metalurgi Rustavi	17 Apr 2019	Liverpool
7	Houssem Aouar	15	–	28	–	43	16 Feb 2017	AZ	11 Apr 2024	AC Milan
8	Islam Slimani	15	6	19	–	40	17 Sep 2014	NK Maribor	20 Apr 2023	AZ
9	Billel Omrani	15	4	18	–	37	23 Aug 2012	Sheriff Tiraspol	9 Dec 2021	Jablonec
10	Yassine Benzia	10	2	23	–	35	4 Oct 2012	Ironi Kiryat Shmona	14 March 2024	Bayer Leverkusen
11	Rafik Djebbour	18	–	17	–	35	20 Sep 2007	FC Sochaux	24 Nov 2014	FC Barcelona
12	Rachid Ghezzal	18	2	12	–	32	4 Oct 2012	Hapoel Kiryat Shmona	26 Oct 2023	Bodø/Glimt
13	Ismaël Bennacer	16	–	14	–	30	7 Dec 2021	Liverpool	18 Apr 2024	AS Roma
14	Ali Benarbia	16	–	14	–	30	24 Sep 1996	Hutnik Kraków	13 Mar 2001	Galatasaray
=	Saïd Benrahma	–	13	17	–	30	30 Sep 2021	Rapid Wien	30 Nov 2023	FK TSC
16	Sofiane Hanni	8	–	20	–	28	26 Jul 2016	Rostov	13 Dec 2018	Villarreal
17	Nabil Bentaleb	6	–	21	–	27	20 Feb 2014	FC Dnipro	12 Mar 2019	Manchester City
18	Ramy Bensebaini	10	–	15	–	25	20 Sep 2018	Jablonec	13 Dec 2023	Paris Saint-Germain

^{1} ^{Includes the UEFA Cup Winners' Cup and UEFA Europa Conference League.}

Correct as of 1 June 2024 (UTC)

== List All-time top goalscorers for the Algerian players in european Competitions ==
Bold Still playing competitive football in Europe

List of Algerian players with 10 or more goals in European competitions
#	Name	Goals					Date of debut	Debut against	Date of last goal	Final goal against
#	Name	C1	C2^{1}	C3	SC	TOTAL	Date of debut	Debut against	Date of last goal	Final goal against
1	Riyad Mahrez	20	–	–	–	20	14 Sep 2016	Club Brugge	22 Feb 2023	RB Leipzig
2	Sofiane Feghouli	7	–	8	–	15	7 Nov 2012	BATE Borisov	25 Nov 2021	Marseille
3	Rabah Madjer	12	–	2	–	14	17 Sep 1986	Rabat Ajax	3 Oct 1990	Portadown
4	Hillel Soudani	7	–	6	–	13	16 Jul 2013	Fola Esch	24 Aug 2016	Red Bull Salzburg
5	Billel Omrani	8	–	4	–	12	16 Aug 2018	Alashkert	10 Aug 2021	Young Boys
=	Islam Slimani	4	1	7	–	12	5 Nov 2014	Schalke 04	16 Mar 2023	Villarreal

^{1} ^{Includes the UEFA Cup Winners' Cup and UEFA Europa Conference League.}

Correct as of 1 June 2024 (UTC)

== List of Algerian players hat-tricks in european League ==
Position key: GK – Goalkeeper; DF – Defender; MF – Midfielder; FW – Forward; ^{4} – Player scored four goals; ^{6} – Player scored six goals; * – The home team

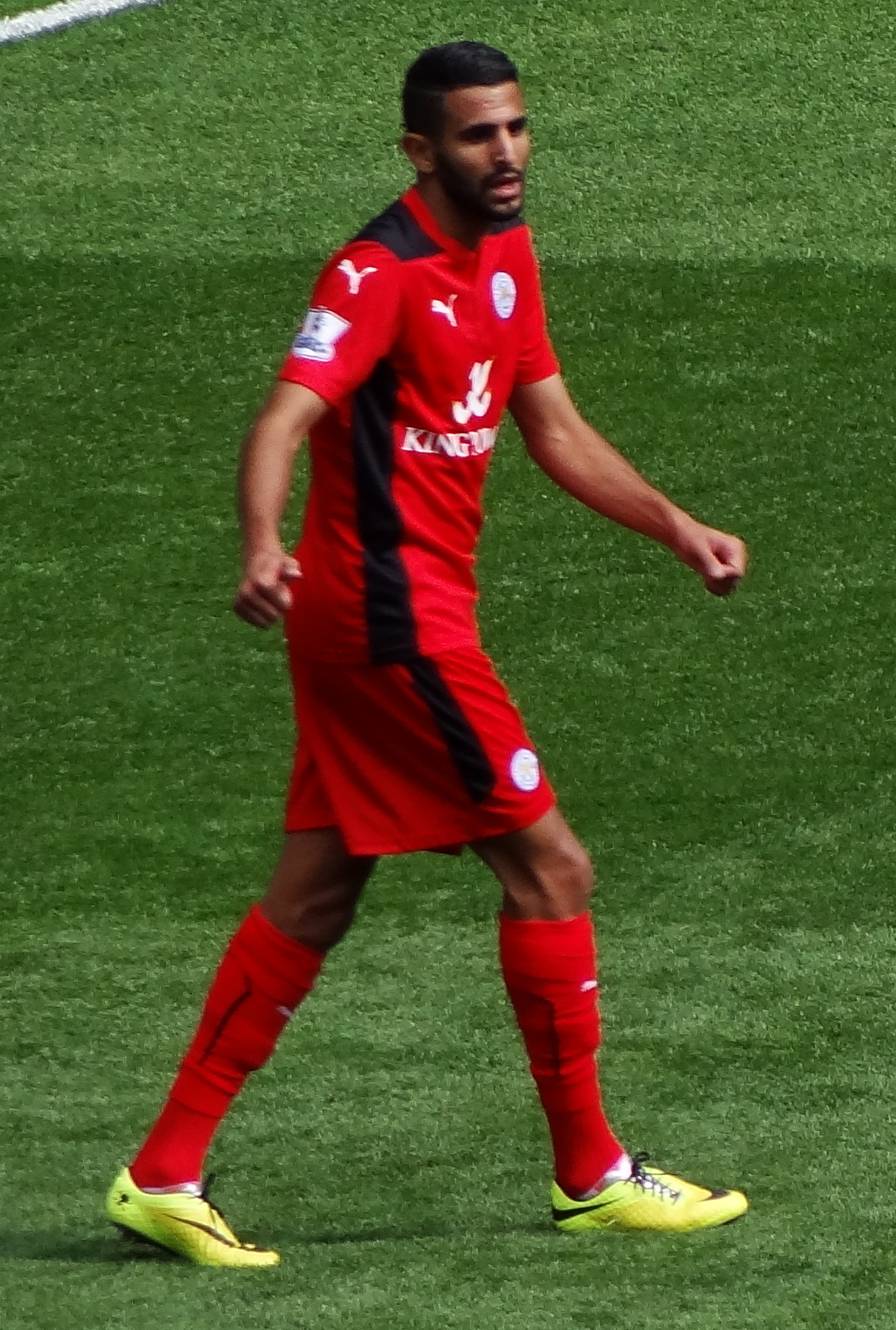
Riyad Mahrez the first Algerian to score a Premier League hat-trick. against Swansea City.

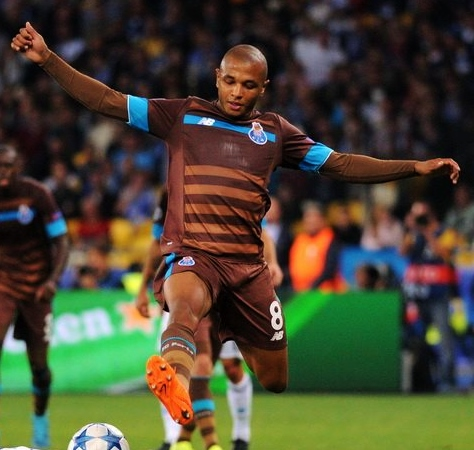
Yacine Brahimi the first Algerian player to score a hat-trick in the UEFA Champions League in its new version.

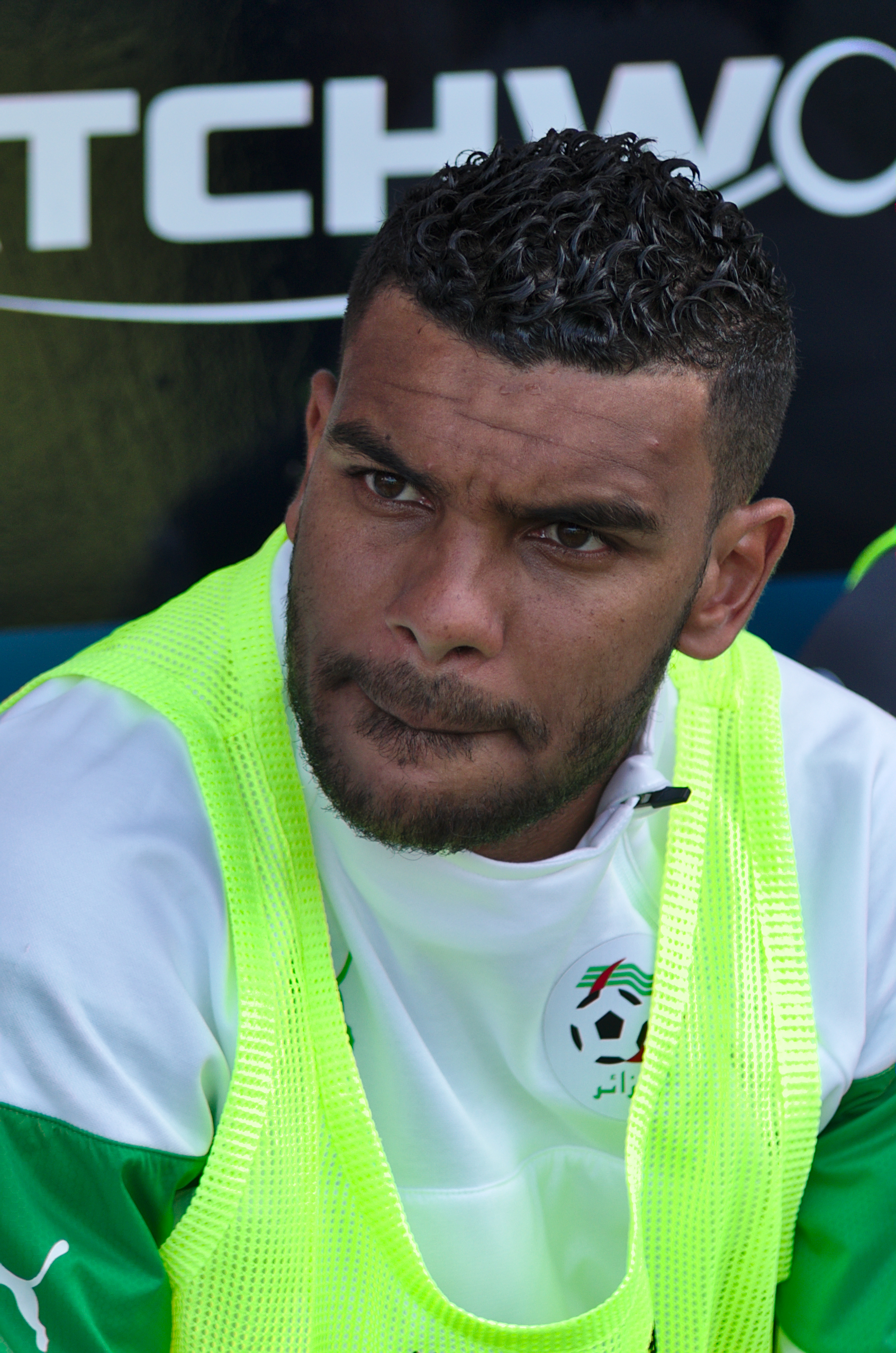
El Arabi Hillel Soudani the first Algerian to score a hat-trick in the UEFA Europa League he also has three hat-trick in the Prva HNL with Dinamo Zagreb.

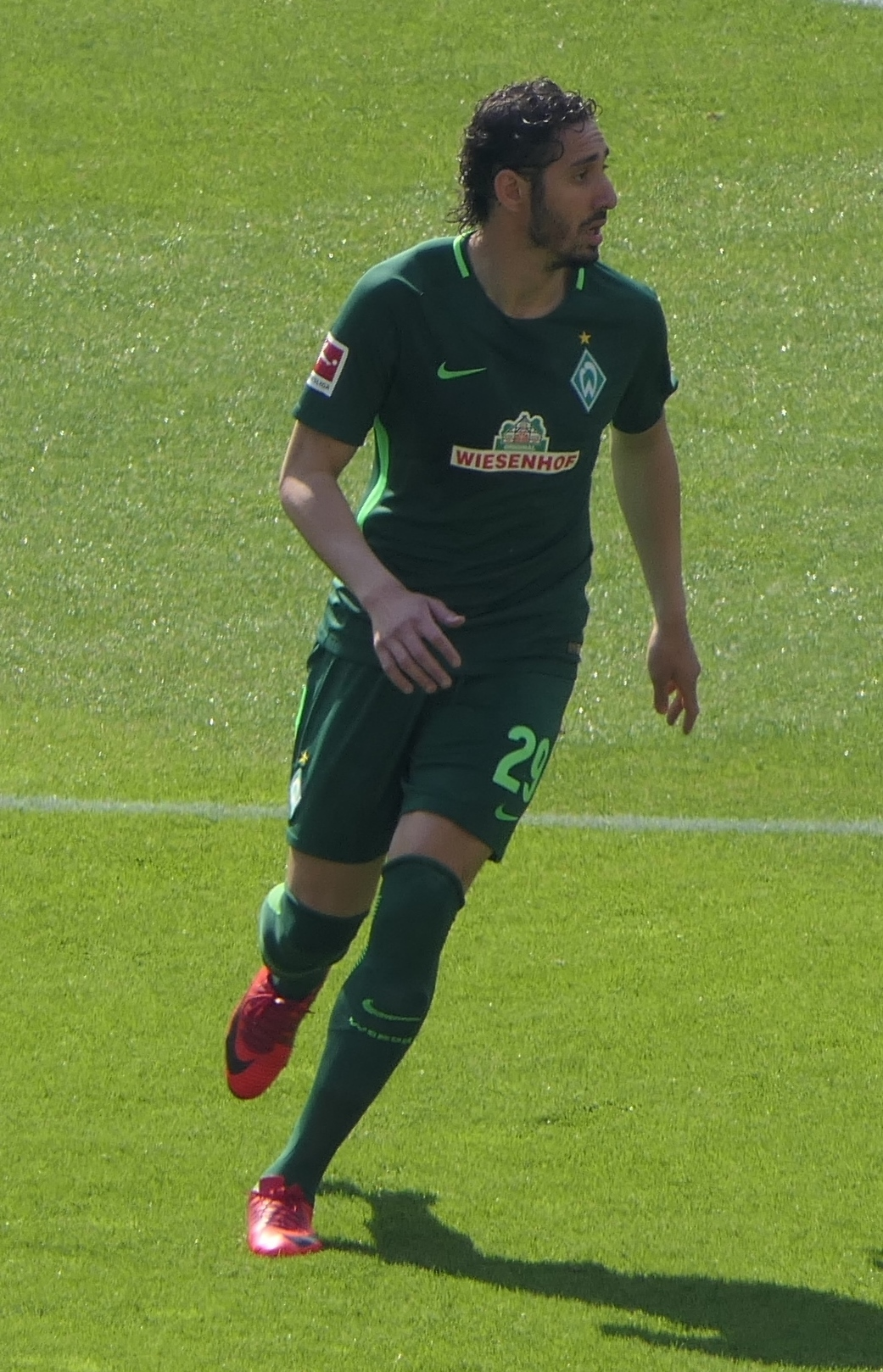
Ishak Belfodil the first Algerian to score a hat-trick in Bundesliga.

Player	Position	For	Against	Result	Date	League	Ref
Rachid Mekloufi	FW	AS Saint-Étienne	Bordeaux*	3–4	1 May 1956	Ligue 1	
Rachid Mekloufi	FW	AS Saint-Étienne*	Marseille	6–3	26 August 1956	Ligue 1	
Rachid Mekloufi	FW	AS Saint-Étienne	Stade de Reims*	5–4	30 September 1956	Ligue 1	
Abdelhamid Bouchouk	FW	Toulouse FC*	Stade Rennais	6–0	18 November 1956	Ligue 1	
Rachid Mekloufi	FW	AS Saint-Étienne*	FC Sochaux	6–0	25 November 1956	Ligue 1	
Rachid Mekloufi	FW	AS Saint-Étienne	Marseille*	3–4	17 March 1957	Ligue 1	
Abdelhamid Kermali	FW	Olympique Lyonnais	RC Paris*	4–2	29 December 1957	Ligue 1	
Mahi Khennane	FW	Stade Rennais*	CS Sedan	3–1	26 April 1959	Ligue 1	
Ahmed Oudjani	FW	RC Lens*	Bordeaux	3–1	7 February 1960	Ligue 1	
Mohamed Salem	FW	CS Sedan*	FC Rouen	4–0	27 August 1960	Ligue 1	
Mohamed Salem	FW	CS Sedan*	FC Grenoble	3–0	27 November 1960	Ligue 1	
Ahmed Oudjani	FW	RC Lens	Marseille*	3–3	14 October 1962	Ligue 1	
Rachid Mekloufi	FW	AS Saint-Étienne*	US Boulogne	4–3	10 February 1963	Ligue 1	
Mohamed Salem	FW	CS Sedan	RC Strasbourg*	5–1	24 March 1963	Ligue 1	
Rachid Mekloufi	FW	AS Saint-Étienne	CA Paris*	4–0	7 April 1963	Ligue 1	
Rachid Mekloufi	FW	AS Saint-Étienne*	SC Toulon	3–1	21 April 1963	Ligue 1	
Salah Djebaïli^{4}	MF	Nîmes Olympique*	OGC Nice	6–3	21 April 1963	Ligue 1	
Ahmed Oudjani	FW	RC Lens*	Marseille	8–1	28 April 1963	Ligue 1	
Mahi Khennane	FW	Toulouse FC*	US Valenciennes	5–1	25 May 1963	Ligue 1	
Ahmed Oudjani^{6}	FW	RC Lens*	RC Paris	10–2	8 December 1963	Ligue 1	
Salah Djebaïli	MF	Nîmes Olympique*	Stade rennais	3–1	15 March 1964	Ligue 1	
Rachid Mekloufi	FW	AS Saint-Étienne*	Lille OSC	7–4	24 October 1965	Ligue 1	
Mohamed Lekkak	FW	FC Rouen	CS Sedan*	4–4	11 November 1965	Ligue 1	
Mohamed Lekkak	FW	Olympique lyonnais*	FC Nantes	3–1	12 October 1968	Ligue 1	
Mustapha Dahleb	MF	CS Sedan*	AS Troyes	4–3	25 May 1974	Ligue 1	
Mustapha Dahleb	MF	Paris Saint-Germain	AS Nancy*	4–2	8 November 1975	Ligue 1	
Mustapha Dahleb	MF	Paris Saint-Germain*	AS Saint-Étienne	4–1	9 November 1977	Ligue 1	
Karim Maroc	FW	Olympique Lyonnais*	Angers SCO	5–1	11 October 1980	Ligue 1	
Chérif Oudjani	FW	RC Lens*	FC Tours	6–1	2 November 1984	Ligue 1	
Chérif Oudjani	FW	Stade lavallois*	Toulouse FC	3–2	11 October 1985	Ligue 1	
Rabah Madjer	MF	Porto*	Marítimo	4–2	1 December 1985	Primeira Liga	
Rabah Madjer	MF	Porto*	Belenenses	7–1	26 August 1987	Primeira Liga	
Rabah Madjer	FW	Porto	Feirense*	1–4	19 November 1989	Primeira Liga	
Rabah Madjer	MF	Porto*	Feirense	3–0	1 April 1989	Primeira Liga	
Farid Ghazi	FW	HJK Helsinki*	FC Inter	5–0	3 August 2006	Veikkausliiga	
Idir Ouali	FW	Mouscron*	Gent	4–2	13 September 2008	Belgian First Division	
Fouad Bouguerra	FW	Nyíregyháza*	Szombathelyi	3–3	19 May 2010	Nemzeti Bajnokság I	
Fouad Bouguerra	FW	Nyíregyháza	Zalaegerszegi*	3–4	22 May 2010	Nemzeti Bajnokság I	
Samir Louadj	MF	Grevenmacher	Swift Hesperange*	3–2	2 October 2010	National Division	
Hillel Soudani	FW	Dinamo Zagreb*	Slaven Koprivnica	3–0	3 May 2014	Croatian First League	
Islam Slimani	FW	Sporting CP*	Vitória de Guimarães	5–1	4 October 2015	Primeira Liga	
Riyad Mahrez	MF	Leicester City	Swansea City*	3–0	5 December 2015	Premier League	
Okacha Hamzaoui	FW	Nacional	Feirense*	3–0	24 September 2016	Primeira Liga	
Nabil Ghilas	FW	Gaziantepspor	Kayserispor*	4–3	18 March 2017	Süper Lig	
Hillel Soudani	FW	Dinamo Zagreb*	Rijeka	5–2	27 May 2017	Croatian First League	
Hillel Soudani	FW	Dinamo Zagreb	Lokomotiva*	3–0	27 August 2017	Croatian First League	
Sofiane Hanni	MF	Anderlecht	Standard Liège*	3–3	28 January 2018	Belgian First Division	
Sofiane Feghouli	MF	Galatasaray	Kasımpaşa*	4–1	17 February 2019	Süper Lig	
Ishak Belfodil	FW	1899 Hoffenheim	FC Augsburg*	4–0	7 April 2019	Bundesliga	
Youcef Atal	DF	Nice*	Guingamp	3–0	28 April 2019	Ligue 1	
Riyad Mahrez	MF	Manchester City*	Burnley	5–0	28 November 2020	Premier League	
Andy Delort	FW	Nice	Reims*	3–2	21 May 2022	Ligue 1	
Amine Gouiri	FW	Rennais	Ajaccio*	5–0	21 May 2023	Ligue 1	
Yassine Benzia	FW	Qarabağ FK*	Kapaz PFK	7–1	4 November 2023	Azerbaijan Premier League	
Amine Gouiri	FW	Marseille*	Brest	4–1	27 April 2025	Ligue 1	

List of Algerian players hat-tricks in UEFA competitions

Player	Position	For	Against	Result	Date	League	Ref
Rabah Madjer^{4}	MF	Porto	Portadown*	8–1	3 October 1990	European Cup	
Yacine Brahimi	MF	Porto*	BATE Borisov	6–0	17 September 2014	Champions League	
El Arbi Hillel Soudani	FW	Dinamo Zagreb*	Astra Giurgiu	5–1	18 September 2014	Europa League	
Billel Omrani	FW	CFR Cluj*	Astana	3–1	17 July 2019	Champions League	

=== Multiple hat-tricks ===
Rank	Player	Hat-tricks	Last hat-trick
1	Rachid Mekloufi	9	24 October 1965
2	Rabah Madjer	5	3 October 1990
3	Ahmed Oudjani	4	8 December 1963
3	El Arbi Hillel Soudani	4	27 August 2017
5	Mohamed Salem	3	24 March 1963
5	Mustapha Dahleb	3	9 November 1977
7	Salah Djebaïli	2	15 March 1964
7	Riyad Mahrez	2	28 November 2020
7	Mahi Khennane	2	25 May 1963
7	Mohamed Lekkak	2	12 October 1968
7	Chérif Oudjani	2	11 October 1985
7	Fouad Bouguerra	2	22 May 2010
7	Amine Gouiri	2	27 April 2025

=== By Leagues ===
R.	League	Hat-tricks	Last hat-trick
1	Ligue 1	34	27 April 2025
2	Primeira Liga	6	24 September 2016
3	Croatian First League	3	27 August 2017
=	UEFA Champions League	3	17 July 2019
5	Belgian First Division	2	28 January 2018
=	Premier League	2	28 November 2020
=	Nemzeti Bajnokság I	2	22 May 2010
=	Süper Lig	2	17 February 2019
9	Veikkausliiga	1	3 August 2006
=	Bundesliga	1	7 April 2019
=	National Division	1	2 October 2010
=	Azerbaijan Premier League	1	4 November 2023
=	UEFA Europa League	1	18 September 2014

== List All-time top goalscorers in All european Competitions ==
List of Algerian players with 100 or more goals (Note: Goals scored in the Cup, League Cup and the Super Cup, and players with second level clubs are not counted.)
R.	Player	League	Cup	LC	SC	Europe	TOTAL Goals
1	Rachid Mekhloufi	156	9	–	1	4	170
2	Rafik Djebbour	110	15	–	–	7	132
3	Riyad Mahrez	82	11	10	–	20	123
4	Mustapha Dahleb	102	13	–	–	–	115
5	Mohamed Salem	103	11	–	–	–	114
6	Hillel Soudani	91	9	–	–	13	113
7	Islam Slimani	83	8	4	–	12	107
8	Mahi Khennane	98	7	–	–	–	105
9	Ahmed Oudjani	95	8	–	–	–	103

As of 12 June 2023

== Algerian players Titles in European clubs ==
This statistics of Algerian players who won titles in Europe where the player must be Algerian whether he played for the Algeria national football team or from an Algerian father and mother. He has never been represent another country, but if he plays for another national team and then plays for the Algeria team he is considered an Algerian player, and the same thing if he played with teams Under-23, Under-20 and Under-17.

Bold Still playing competitive football in Europe

#	Name	League	Cup	Others	Europe	TOTAL
1	Riyad Mahrez	(England) 2016, 2019, 2021, 2022, 2023	(England) 2019, 2023	(England) 2018, 2019, 2020, 2021	(Europe) 2023	12
2	Hillel Soudani	(Croatia) 2014, 2015, 2016, 2018 (Greece) 2020	(Portugal) 2013 (Croatia) 2015, 2016, 2018 (Greece) 2020	(Croatia) 2013		11
3	Rafik Djebbour	(Greece) 2011, 2012, 2013 (Cyprus) 2015	(Greece) 2012, 2013, 2016 (Cyprus) 2015			8
=	Rachid Mekloufi	(France) 1957, 1964, 1967, 1968 (Switzerland) 1962	(France) 1968	(France) 1957, 1967		8
=	Billel Omrani	(Romania) 2018, 2019, 2020, 2021, 2022		(France) 2012 (Romania) 2018, 2020		8
6	Rabah Madjer	(Portugal) 1986, 1990	(Portugal) 1991	(Portugal) 1986, 1990	(Europe) 1987, 1987 (Note: Includes the Intercontinental Cup)	7
7	Madjid Bougherra	(Scotland) 2009, 2010, 2011	(Scotland) 2009	(Scotland) 2010, 2011		6
8	Moussa Saïb	(France) 1996	(France) 1994, 1996, 2002	(England) 1999		5
=	Yassine Benzia	(Azerbaijan) 2023, 2024, 2025	(Azerbaijan) 2024	(France) 2012		5
10	Samir Louadj	(Luxembourg) 2008, 2009, 2014	(Luxembourg) 2009			4
=	Djamel Abdoun	(Greece) 2012, 2013	(Greece) 2012, 2013			4
=	Sofiane Feghouli	(Turkey) 2018, 2019	(Turkey) 2019	(Turkey) 2019		4
=	Brahim Hemdani	(Scotland) 2009	(Scotland) 2008, 2009	(Scotland) 2008		4
=	Faouzi Ghoulam		(Italy) 2014, 2020	(France) 2013 (Italy) 2014		4
=	Bark Seghiri	(Cyprus) 2007, 2009	(Cyprus) 2008	(Cyprus) 2008		4
=	Samir Louadj	(Luxembourg) 2008, 2009, 2014	(Luxembourg) 2009			4
=	Ismaël Bennacer	(Italy) 2022 , (Croatia) 2026	(Croatia) 2026	(Italy) 2025		4
18	Abdelaziz Ben Tifour	(France) 1951, 1952	(France) 1952			3
=	Mohamed Firoud	(France) 1951, 1952	(France) 1952			3
=	Ali Benarbia	(France) 1997, 1999		(France) 1997		3
=	Rachid Ghezzal	(Turkey) 2021	(Turkey) 2021, 2024			3
=	Abdallah Liegeon	(France) 1982	(France) 1985	(France) 1985		3
=	Walid Hamidi	(North Macedonia) 2022, (Kosovo) 2024	(Kosovo) 2024			3
=	Mehdi Kirch	(Luxembourg) 2013, 2015, 2022				3
#	Name	League	Cup	Others	Europe	TOTAL
25	Monsef Bakrar	(Croatia) 2026	(Croatia) 2026			2
=	Abdelhafid Tasfaout	(France) 1996	(France) 1996			2
=	Karim Groune	(Luxembourg) 2003	(Luxembourg) 2003			2
=	Mohamed Maouche	(France) 1958	(France) 1958			2
=	Amin Chiakha	(Denmark) 2025	(Denmark) 2025			2
=	Sadek Boukhalfa	(France) 1965		(France) 1965		2
=	Yacine Brahimi	(Portugal) 2018		(Portugal) 2018		2
=	Sofiane Hanni	(Belgium) 2017		(Belgium) 2017		2
=	Mohamed Amoura		(Switzerland) 2022 (Belgium) 2024			2
=	Mustapha Dahleb		(France) 1982, 1983			2
=	Naçer Bouiche		(Hungary) 1991, 1994			2
=	Islam Slimani		(Portugal) 2015	(Portugal) 2015		2
=	Jugurtha Hamroun		(France) 2009	(Romania) 2016		2
=	Hocine Bouchache		(France) 1959	(France) 1959		2
=	Mourad Meghni		(Italy) 2009	(Italy) 2009		2
=	Amir Sayoud		(Bulgaria) 2013	(Bulgaria) 2013		2
=	Ramiz Zerrouki		(Netherlands) 2024	(Netherlands) 2024		2
=	Kader Ferhaoui		(France) 1990	(France) 1992		2
=	Rayan Aït-Nouri		(England) 2026	(England) 2026		2
=	Akim Zedadka	(Azerbaijan) 2026	(Azerbaijan) 2026			2
=	Zinédine Ould Khaled	(Azerbaijan) 2026	(Azerbaijan) 2026			2
#	Name	League	Cup	Others	Europe	TOTAL
46	Yacine Hima	(Azerbaijan) 2011				1
=	Karim Zedadka	(Italy) 2023				1
=	Jaouen Hadjam	(Switzerland) 2024				1
=	Abdeljalil Medioub	(Cyprus) 2023				1
=	Kevin Van Den Kerkhof	(Luxembourg) 2022				1
=	Toufik Zeghdane	(Luxembourg) 2023				1
=	Mehdi Terki	(Luxembourg) 2023				1
=	El Hedi Belameiri	(Luxembourg) 2023				1
=	Rachid Bouhenna	(Romania) 2022				1
=	Djamel Mesbah	(Switzerland) 2005				1
=	Ismaël Bouzid	(Turkey) 2008				1
=	Ahmed Reda Madouni	(Germany) 2002				1
=	Salim Kerkar	(Scotland) 2011				1
=	Karim Belhocine	(Belgium) 2015				1
=	Ahmed Touba	(Belgium) 2018				1
=	Youssef Haraoui	(Czechoslovakia) 1992				1
=	Ahmed Rani	(Luxembourg) 2013				1
=	Idir Boutrif	(Luxembourg) 2021				1
=	Mehdi Boudjemaa	(Hungary) 2023				1
=	Akram Bouras	(Bulgaria) 2026				1
=	Monsef Bakrar	(Croatia) 2026				1
=	Nadhir Benbouali	(Hungary) 2026				1
=	Sofyane Cherfa		(Cyprus) 2012			1
=	Mehdi Abeid		(Greece) 2014			1
=	Mehdi Zeffane		(France) 2019			1
=	Anis Hadj Moussa			(Netherlands) 2024		1
=	Ramy Bensebaini		(France) 2019			1
=	Farès Chaïbi		(France) 2023			1
=	Billal Zouani		(Finland) 2001			1
=	Farid Ghazi		(Finland) 2006			1
=	Mohamed Medjoudj		(Finland) 2006			1
=	Mohamed Boumezrag		(France) 1941			1
=	Rachid Belaid		(France) 1954			1
=	Saïd Brahimi		(France) 1957			1
=	Abdelhamid Bouchouk		(France) 1957			1
=	Mohamed Salem		(France) 1961			1
=	Fathi Chebel		(France) 1978			1
=	Radhouane Abbes		(France) 1990			1
=	Youssef Salimi		(France) 1997			1
=	Rafik Mezriche		(France) 2001			1
=	Karim Ziani		(France) 2007			1
=	Mehdi Guerrouad		(Belgium) 2003			1
=	Mourad Boukellal		(Luxembourg) 2005			1
=	Mehdi Léris		(Italy) 2017			1
=	Yassin Maouche		(Switzerland) 2018			1
=	Mohamed Mezghrani		(Hungary) 2020			1
=	Mohamed Brahimi		(Bulgaria) 2024			1
=	Adem Zorgane		(Belgium) 2026			1
=	Hassan Yebda			(Portugal) 2009		1
=	Nabil Ghilas			(Portugal) 2013		1
=	Abdelmajid Bourebbou			(France) 1982		1
=	Djamel Belmadi			(France) 1995		1
=	Rachid Benayen			(France) 2000		1
=	Salim Arrache			(France) 2005		1
=	Habib Bellaïd			(France) 2005		1
=	Nadir Belhadj			(France) 2007		1
=	Aymen Tahar			(Romania) 2016		1
=	Saïd Benrahma				(Europe) 2023	1
=	Yacine Titraoui			(France) 2026		1

== Summary UEFA ==
=== List by League UEFA ===
R.	League	Titles	Winning Years
1	(France) Ligue 1	15	1951 x2, 1952 x2, 1957, 1958, 1964, 1965, 1967, 1968, 1982, 1996 x2, 1997, 1999
2	(Luxembourg) National Division	10	2003, 2008, 2009, 2013, 2014, 2021, 2022, 2023 x3
3	(Romania) Liga I	7	2016, 2018, 2019, 2020, 2021, 2022 x2
4	(Croatia) First League	6	2014, 2015, 2016, 2018, 2026 x2
5	(Greece) Super League	6	2011, 2012 x2, 2013 x2, 2020
6	(England) Premier League	5	2016, 2019, 2021, 2022, 2023
7	(Turkey) Süper Lig	4	2008, 2018, 2019, 2021
=	(Scotland) Premiership	4	2009 x2, 2010, 2011
=	(Cyprus) Cyta Championship	4	2007, 2009, 2015, 2023
=	(Azerbaijan) Premier League	4	2011, 2023, 2024, 2025
11	(Portugal) Primeira Liga	3	1986, 1991, 2018
=	(Switzerland) Super League	3	1962, 2005, 2024
=	(Belgium) Pro League	3	2015, 2017, 2018
14	(Italy) Serie A	2	2022, 2023
15	(Czechoslovakia) Czechoslovak League ¤^{[m]}	1	1992
=	(Germany) Bundesliga	1	2002
=	(North Macedonia) First League	1	2022
=	(Kosovo) Superliga e Kosovës	1	2024
=	(Denmark) Danish Superliga	1	2025

=== List by Cup UEFA ===
R.	Cup	Titles	Winning Years
1	Coupe de France	27	1941, 1952 x2, 1954, 1957 x2, 1958, 1959, 1961, 1968, 1978, 1982, 1983, 1985, 1990 x2, 1994, 1996 x2, 1997, 2001, 2002, 2007, 2009, 2019 x2, 2023
2	(Greece) Kypello Elladas	7	2012 x2, 2013 x2, 2014, 2016, 2020
3	(Croatia) Hrvatski kup	4	2015, 2016, 2018, 2026
4	(Hungary) Magyar Kupa	3	1991, 1994, 2020
=	(Italy) Coppa Italia	3	2009, 2014, 2020
=	Taça de Portugal	3	1991, 2013, 2015
=	(Scotland) Scottish Cup	3	2008, 2009 x2
=	(Turkey) Türkiye Kupası	3	2019, 2021, 2024
=	(Finland) Finnish Cup	3	2001, 2006 x2
10	(Cyprus) Cypriot Cup	2	2012, 2015
=	Luxembourg Cup	2	2003, 2009
=	(England) FA Cup	2	2019, 2023
13	Kupa na Bulgaria	1	2013
=	(Netherlands) KNVB Cup	1	2024
=	(Belgium) Belgian Cup	1	2024
=	(Azerbaijan) Azərbaycan Kuboku	1	2024
=	(Kosovo) Kupa e Kosovës	1	2024
=	(Switzerland) Swiss Cup	1	2022
=	(Denmark) Danish Cup	1	2025

=== List by League Cup UEFA ===
R.	League Cup	Titles	Winning Years
1	(France) Coupe de la Ligue (defunct)	9	1965, 1982, 1992, 2000, 2005 x2, 2012 x2, 2013
2	(England) Football League Cup	4	1999, 2019, 2020, 2021
3	(Scotland) Scottish League Cup	3	2008, 2010, 2011
4	(Romania) Cupa Ligii (defunct)	1	2016
=	(Portugal) Taça da Liga	1	2009

=== List by Super Cup UEFA ===
R.	Super Cup	Titles	Winning Years
1	(France) Trophée des Champions	9	1957, 1959, 1967, 1985, 1995, 1997, 2007, 2012, 2026
2	(Portugal) Supertaça	5	1986, 1990, 2013, 2015, 2018
3	(Romania) Supercupa României	2	2018, 2020
=	(Italy) Supercoppa Italiana	2	2009, 2014
=	(Netherlands) Johan Cruyff Shield	2	2024 x2
6	(Croatia) Croatian Super Cup	1	2013
=	(England) FA Community Shield	1	2018
=	(Bulgaria) Bulgarian Supercup	1	2013
=	(Belgium) Belgian Super Cup	1	2017
=	(Turkey) Turkish Super Cup	1	2019

=== List by intercontinental Cup UEFA ===
R.	Intercontinental Cup	Titles	Winning Years
1	UEFA Champions League	2	1987, 2023
2	UEFA Europa Conference League	1	2023
=	Intercontinental Cup (defunct)	1	1987

== Individual honours ==
=== List Top goalscorers Algerian players in europe ===
R.	player	Titles	League Top goalscorers Years
1	Ahmed Oudjani	1	(France) 1964 (30 goals), (Lens)
=	Rafik Djebbour	1	(Greece) 2013 (20 goals), (Olympiacos)
=	El Arbi Hillel Soudani	1	(Croatia) 2018 (17 goals), (Dinamo Zagreb)

=== Algerian players of the Year in European Leagues ===
R.	player	Titles	League player of the Year
1	Rachid Mekhloufi	3	(France) 1964, 1966, 1967 (Saint-Étienne)
2	El Arabi Hillel Soudani	2	(Croatia) 2017, 2018 (Dinamo Zagreb)
3	Ali Benarbia	1	(France) 1999 (Bordeaux)
=	Mahi Khennane	1	(France) 1961 (Stade Rennais)
=	Mohamed Salem	1	(France) 1970 (RC Paris-Sedan)
=	Farid Ghazi	1	(Finland) 2006 (HJK Helsinki)
=	Djamel Abdoun	1	(Greece) 2013 (Olympiacos)
=	Riyad Mahrez	1	(England) 2016 (Leicester City)
=	Sofiane Hanni	1	(Belgium) 2016 (KV Mechelen)
=	Sofiane Feghouli	1	(Turkey) 2019 (Galatasaray)

== Most expensive transfers in the history of Algerian players ==
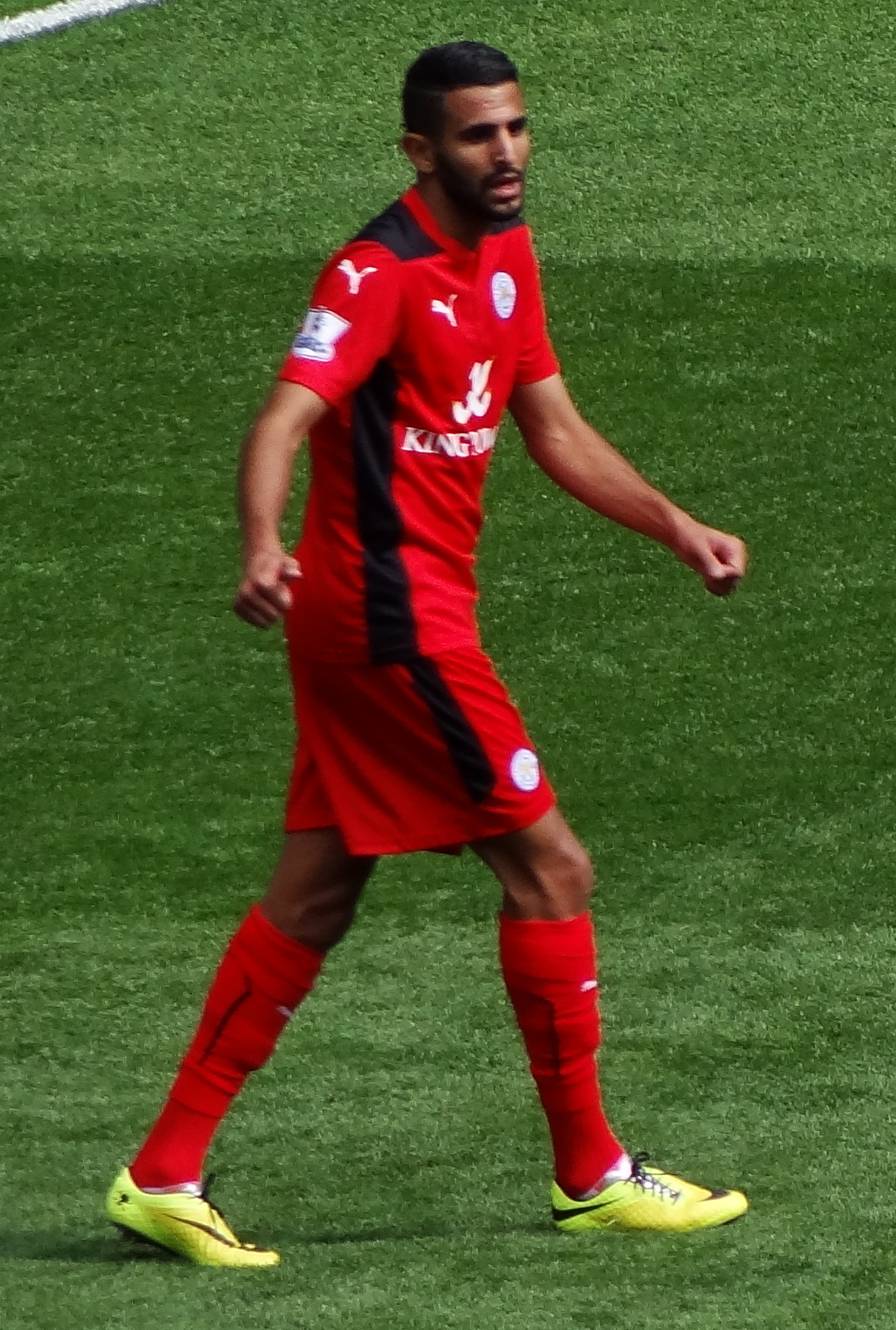
Riyad Mahrez owner of the most expensive transfer deal for African footballer and most expensive transfer deal for Manchester City until 2019 for 67.8 million euros.

Mustapha Dahleb arrived in Paris Saint Germain in 1974, coached by Just Fontaine, the president of the club Daniel Hechter recruited him for 1.35 million francs, record amount for a transfer to France at the time. there is also Moussa Saïb who moved from Auxerre to Valencia with 3,600,000 euros in 1997 in a historic deal for an Algerian player then. In 1998, he joined struggling English club Tottenham for £2.3 million, thus becoming the first Algerian to play in the Premier League. In 2016, Islam Slimani moved into a historic deal for English Premier League champions Leicester City for 28 million pounds to become the most expensive player in the history of Algeria. two years later Riyad Mahrez become the most expensive transfer deal for an Algerian player moved to English Premier League champions Manchester City for 60 million pounds. and also become the most expensive African footballer after he broke the record for Gabonese Pierre-Emerick Aubameyang with £56.1 in 2018 winter transfer window. in the same time most expensive transfer deal for Manchester City and a record transfer fee received by Leicester City. On 19 July 2023, it was reported by the BBC that Manchester City agreed a deal for Riyad Mahrez to join Saudi Pro League club Al Ahli for a transfer fee of £30 million, as the most expensive deal for an Algerian player who moves to a non-European club.

As of 4 August 2019; during the 2019 summer transfer window.

Fee broke the Algerian record at the time of the transfer
Fee broke the national club record
Fee broke the record for an African
Fee broke the record for an Algerian teenager at the time of the transfer (at most at the age of 21 years old)

List of Most expensive transfers in the history of Algerian players with more than 15 Million Euro.
R.	Player	Fee (M €)	From	To	Position	Year	Ref
1	Riyad Mahrez (Note: Fee broke the Algerian record and fee broke the national club record in the same time.)	€67.8	(England) Leicester City	(England) Manchester City	Midfielder	2018	
2	Rayan Aït-Nouri	£31.8 (Note: Converted to Euro 37,75 million, with potential £5.2 million in bonuses.)	(England) Wolverhampton	(England) Manchester City	Defender	2025	
3	Riyad Mahrez	€35	(England) Manchester City	(Saudi Arabia) Al Ahli	Midfielder	2023	
4	Saïd Benrahma	€30	(England) Brentford	(England) West Ham United	Forward	2021	
=	Islam Slimani (Note: Fee broke the Algerian record at the time of the transfer.)	€30	(Portugal) Sporting CP	(England) Leicester City	Forward	2016	
6	Nabil Bentaleb	€20	(England) Tottenham Hotspur	(Germany) Schalke 04	Midfielder	2017	
=	Badredine Bouanani	€20	(France) Nice	(Germany) Stuttgart	Midfielder	2025	
8	Mohamed Amoura	€18	(Belgium) Union SG	(Germany) VfL Wolfsburg	Striker	2024	
9	Ismaël Bennacer	€16	(Italy) Empoli	(Italy) Milan	Midfielder	2019	
10	Rachid Ghezzal	€15	(France) Monaco	(England) Leicester City	Midfielder	2018	

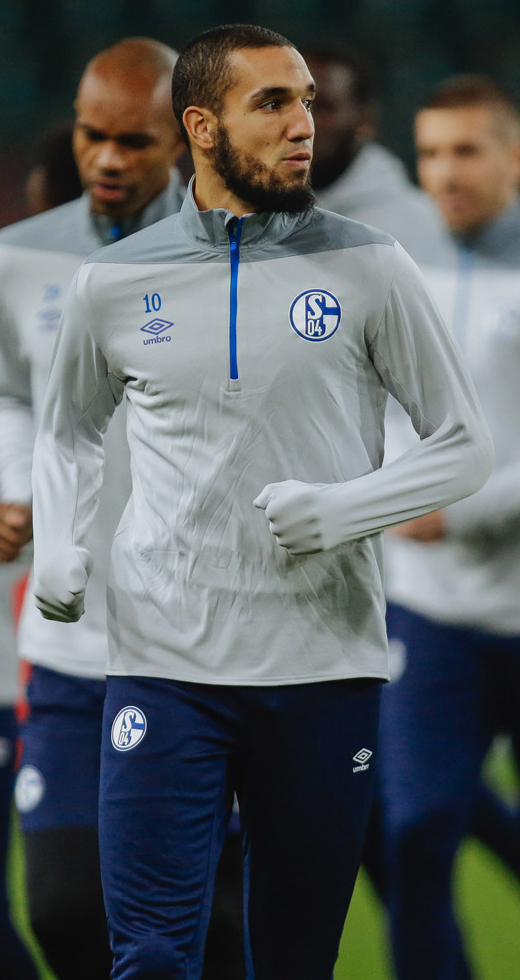
Nabil Bentaleb Fee broke the record for an Algerian teenager at the time of the transfer for 20 million euros at the age of 21.

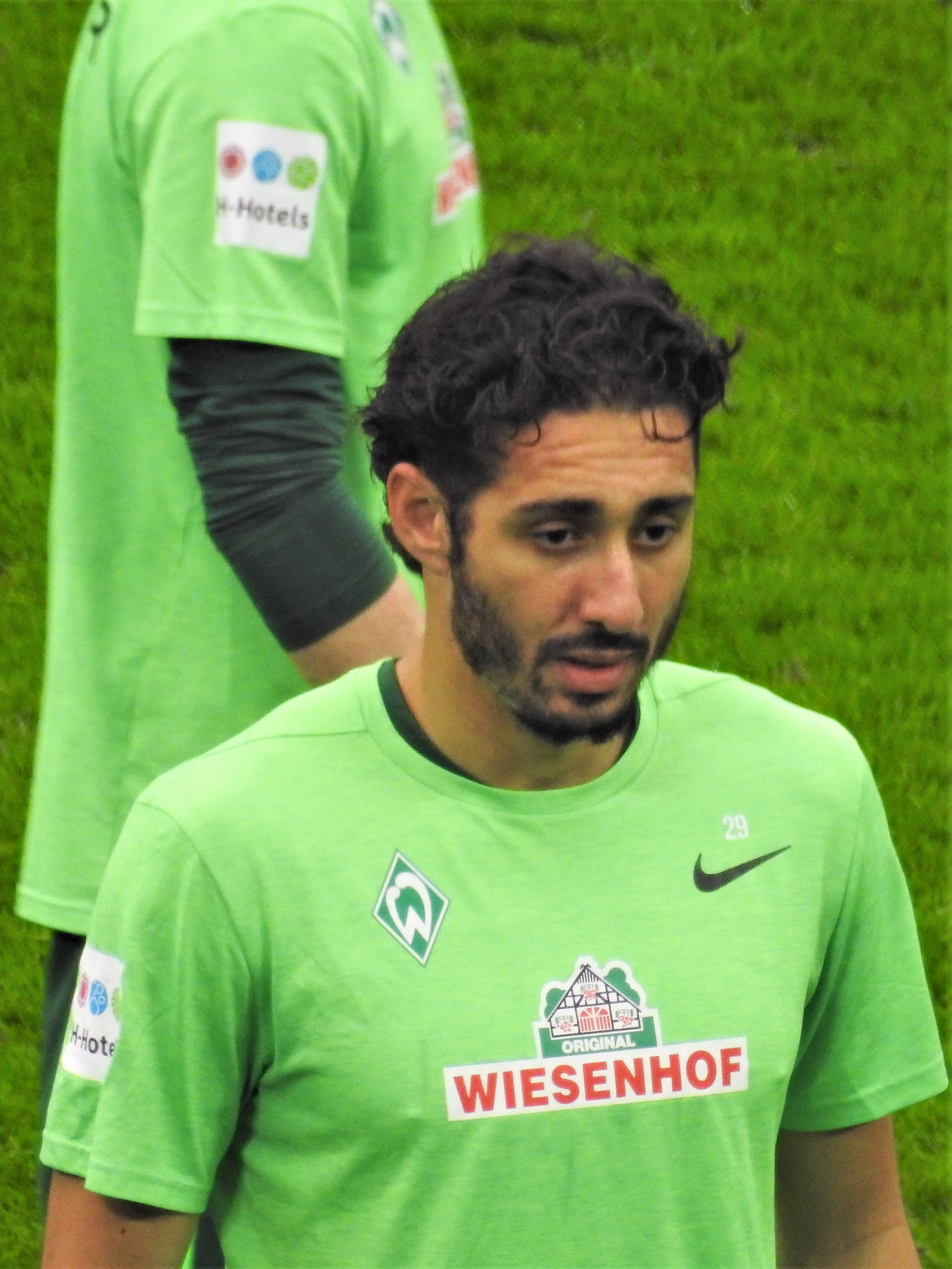
Ishak Belfodil the first Algerian to transfer more than 10 million euros from Parma to Internazionale.

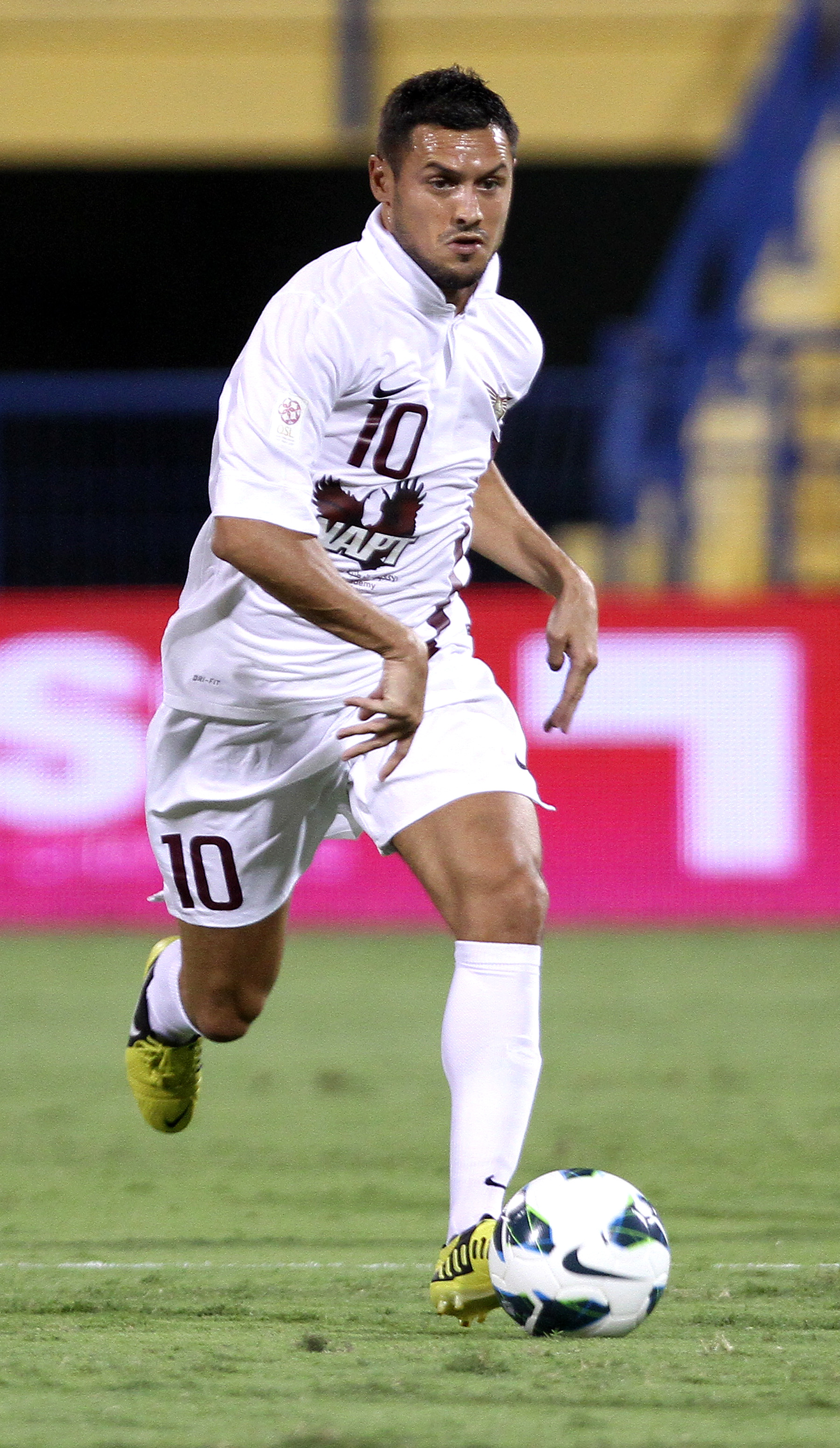
Karim Ziani moved in a historic deal then for an Algerian player from FC Sochaux to Olympique de Marseille worth 8 million euros.

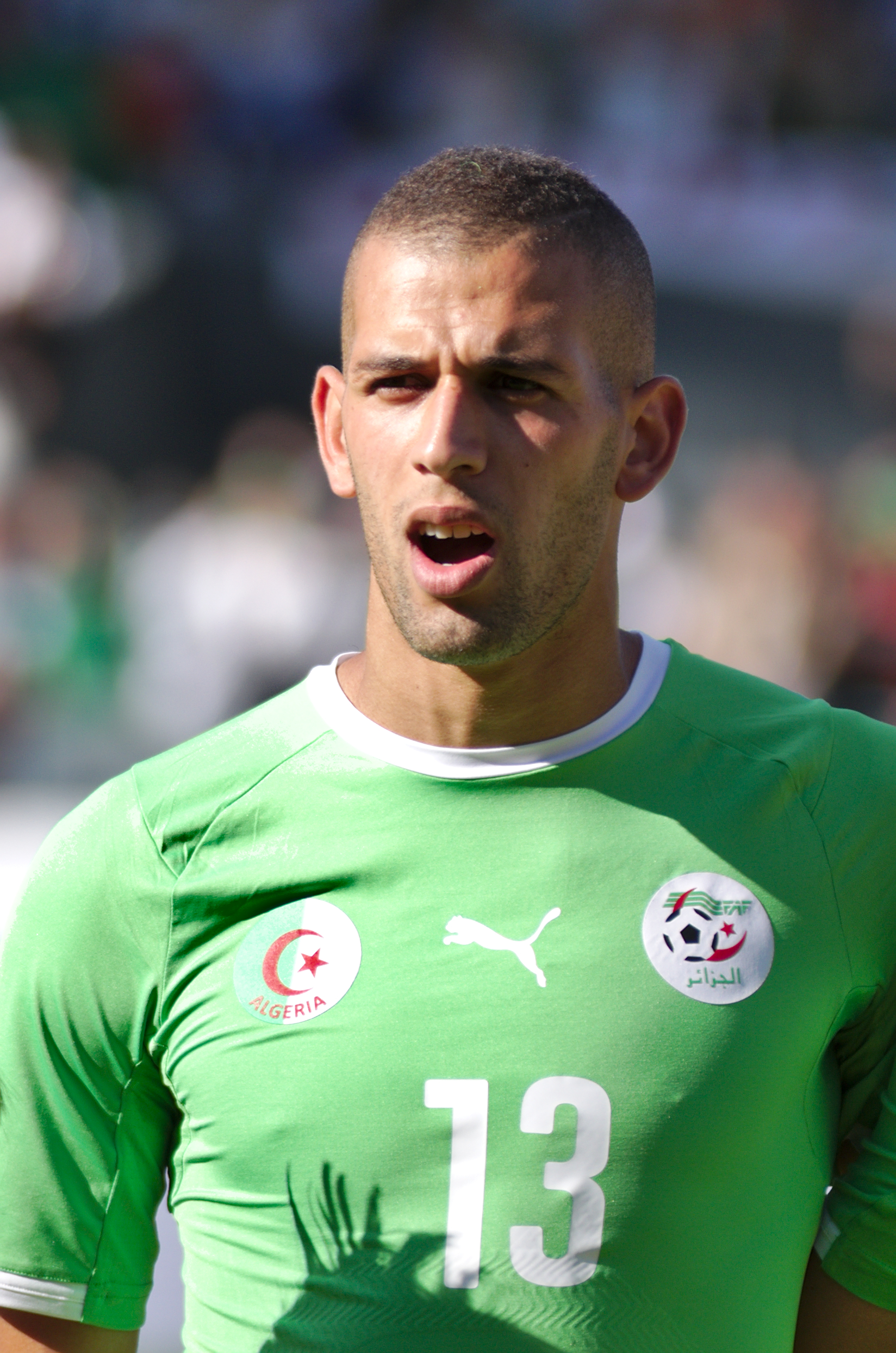
Islam Slimani he had the record for the highest expensive transfer deal for Algerian player until 2018 and owner of the most expensive transfer deal for Leicester City from Sporting CP for 30 million euros.

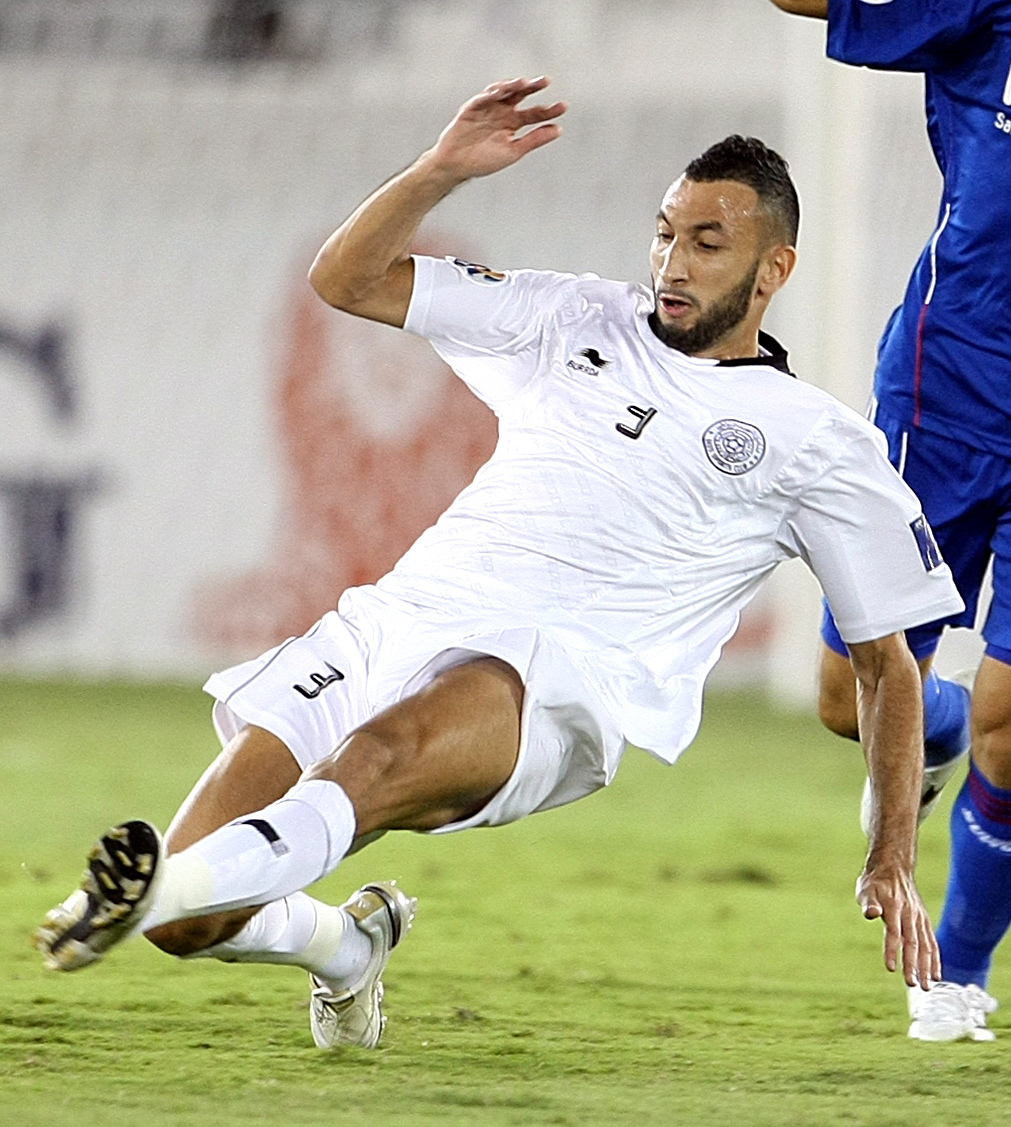
Nadir Belhadj the most expensive Algerian player has moved from a European club to a non-European club for 7,5 million euros from Portsmouth to Sadd Sports Club.

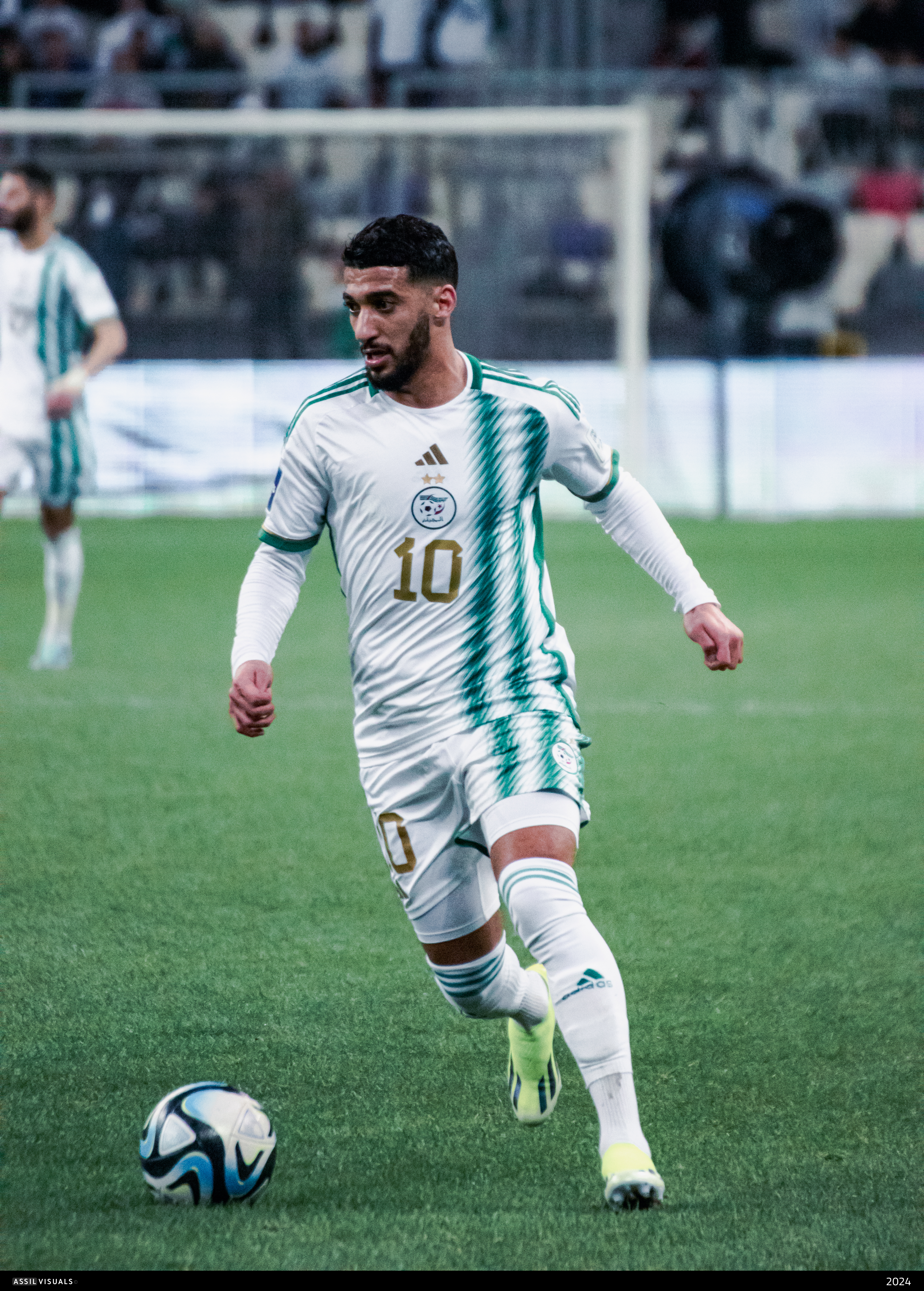
Saïd Benrahma moved from Brentford to West Ham United for 30 million euros.

== History of Algerian players in the rest of the world Leagues ==
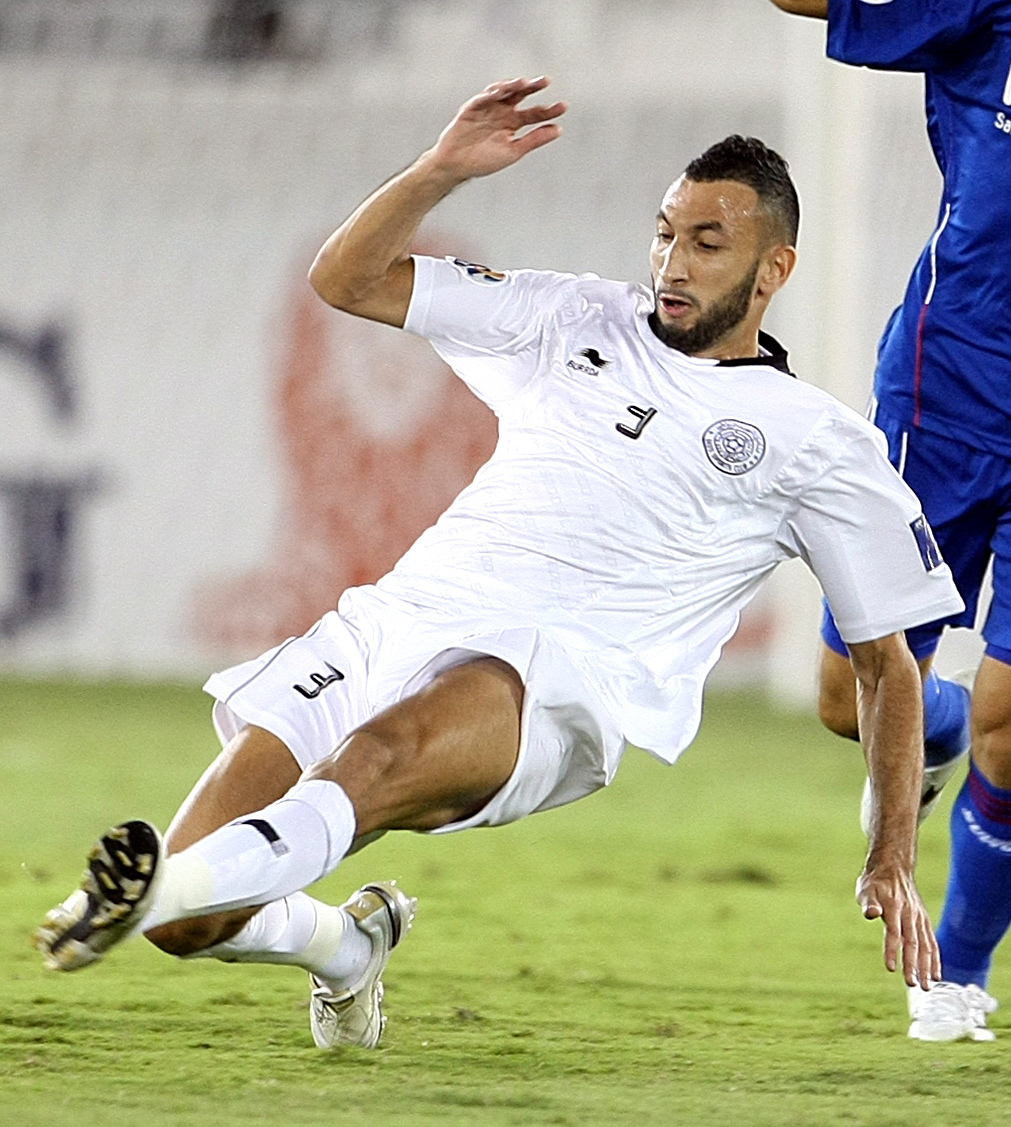
Nadir Belhadj the best Algerian professional player outside of Europe.

Algerian players have played in all continents, most of them in Arab leagues in Africa and Asia, especially in the Persian Gulf, and Nadir Belhadj is the most successful player. played 214 matches in six seasons with the Qatari club Al-Sadd, and 43 matches in two seasons with Al-Sailiya. during which he won 5 titles including the AFC Champions League and participated in the FIFA Club World Cup. the first Algerian to Participates in this competition is Moussa Saïb with Al-Nassr in 2000 and scored one goal, At the level of titles Algerian players won 90 titles in twelve countries, namely Bahrain, Canada, Egypt, Kuwait, Mexico, Morocco, Saudi Arabia, Singapore, Thailand, United Arab Emirates and Tunisia the country where Algerian players have won the highest number of titles with 36, followed by Qatar with 23 titles. and more player won titles is Baghdad Bounedjah with seven, On the level of local league, Youcef Belaïli won with Espérance ST four league championships more than any other Algerian player. in 2010 witnessed the achievement of four Algerian players S.League and League Cup in Singapore, they are Khaled Kharroubi, Karim Boudjema, Nordine Talhi and Mansour Lakehal which has never happened before, The two brothers Mustapha and Abdelaziz Ben Tifour, first who won title outside Algeria by winning the Tunisian Cup twice in 1947 and 1948.

At the level of continental titles and start in Africa, where the Algerian players won eight titles in CAF Champions League, CAF Confederation Cup and CAF Super Cup, mostly with Tunisian clubs and the first to win the continental title is the international goalkeeper Nacerdine Drid with Moroccan club Raja Casablanca in 1989 led by Algerian coach Rabah Saâdane. On 9 November 2018, Twenty-two years later, Youcef Belaïli won the CAF Champions League and for the first time in its new version after winning the final against Al-Ahly, he is the fourth Algerian player to win this title. On the level of Asia, Nadir Belhadj won the AFC Champions League title for the first time for an Algerian player in 2011 and scored the decisive penalty kick.

The transfers of Algerian players to the rest of the world's leagues and the most prominent, Khaled Kharroubi, is the first Algerian to play in South America and exactly in Brazil with Vitória, where he played for one season. Aymen Tahar is the first Algerian to play in the J1 League, but has played only one match. Also, Karim Matmour is the first Algerian to play in Australia's A-League, where he joined Adelaide United, but he left in December 2017, terminating his contract early after playing 11 games. Raïs M'Bolhi is also the first Algerian to play in Major League Soccer with the club Philadelphia Union. After playing in only 9 matches in the 2015 season, head coach Jim Curtin said that M'Bolhi would never play again for Philadelphia. M'Bohli is rated as one of the worst signings in club history. On 22 January 2018, Saphir Taïder signed a three-year deal at Major League Soccer franchise Montreal Impact, starting with a two-year loan and the option of a fourth year. He joined as a Designated Player. The first goal for an Algerian player in MLS was against Atlanta United FC in a 4–1 defeat away. In Africa, Farès Hachi is the first Algerian to play in South Africa, when he joined African champion Mamelodi Sundowns. but played only 21 games in the Premier Soccer League in a season and a half and then left South Africa.

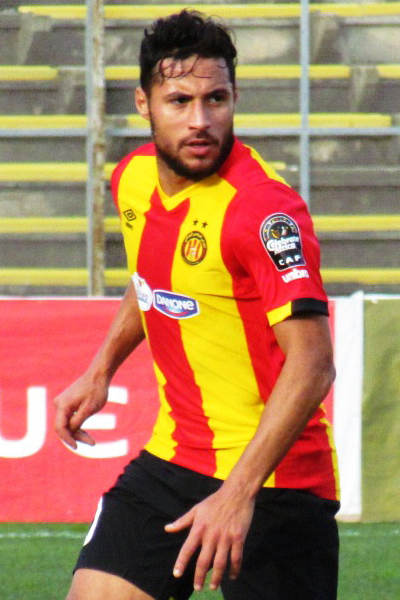
Youcef Belaïli achieved CAF Champions League two consecutive times and four league tournaments more than any other Algerian player.

Also there is the French-born Chaher Zarour who spent the Vietnam League 1 with Sanna Khánh Hòa as the first Algerian player to play there. The first player to play in South Asia was Hamid Berguiga, when he joined Brunei DPMM in Brunei, who plays in the Singapore league and won the League Cup in 2009 first in this region for an Algerian player. In North America, Andy Delort became the first Algerian to win a title there with Mexican club Tigres UANL where Delort won Liga MX Apertura in 2016, although he did not have Algerian citizenship until 2019. Also his transfer deal was the highest for an Algerian player outside Europe where he signed a four-year contract while the transfer fee paid to Caen was reported as €8 million. Three years after Saphir Taïder achieved the Canadian Championship with Montreal Impact after winning against Toronto FC in the final first for an Algerian player.

On the level of statistics and awards, Algerian players won the top scorer in eight times, most notably Bounedjah four times one in Tunisia with Etoile du Sahel and three with Al-Sadd and is considered the same player the most recorded hat-tricks with thirteen. Bounedjah also won the CAF Confederation Cup top scorer with Etoile du Sahel in 2015. On 12 August 2018, Bounedjah broke the Qatar Stars League single-game goal record, scoring 7 goals in a 10–1 win against Al Arabi., Bounedjah continued his success at the individual level by winning the top scorer of the 2018 AFC Champions League with 13 goals to become the first Algerian and the first player from a Qatari club to achieve this award, The Al-Sadd forward matched the all-time single tournament record held by Muriqui who netted the same tally by the conclusion of Guangzhou Evergrande's 2013 campaign. On 7 December 2018, Bounedjah beats Qatar goal record with 28 goals after just 14 matches, He broke the record held by Brazilian striker Clemerson de Araújo, who scored 27 goals in 2007–08. On 23 February 2019, Bounedjah scored in the Qatari classico against Al-Rayyan his 100 goal in all leagues competitions to become the first Algerian player to reach him With one club outside Europe. After changing the laws in Tunisia and considering the players from North Africa local a large number of Algerian players Join the Tunisian Ligue Professionnelle 1.

== Rest of the world Leagues ==
=== Australia ===
Player	Club(s)	Period
Karim Matmour	Adelaide United	2017

=== Bahrain ===
Player	Club(s)	Period
Olivier Boumelaha	Al-Ahli Club	2007–08
Rachid Djebaili	Riffa	2004
Icham Mouissi	Busaiteen Club	2011–012
Sofiane Kheyari	Riffa	2012–13
Karim Boutadjine	Al-Muharraq SC	2015–16
Walid Derrardja	Riffa	2022
Hacène Ogbi	Al-Muharraq SC	2022–23
Hichem Nekkache	Al-Muharraq SC	2022–23
Samy Frioui	Al-Khaldiya SC, Riffa	2022–24, 2024–
Malik Raiah	Al-Khaldiya SC	2023–
Tarek Bouabta	Al-Khaldiya SC	2023–24
Nasreddine Zaâlani	Al-Khaldiya SC	2024–
Oussama Bellatrèche	Al-Khaldiya SC	2024–

=== Brazil ===
Player	Club(s)	Period
Khaled Kharroubi	Bangu, Vitória	2003, 2003–04
Rayane Yanice Belaid	Tupi FC	2018
Islam Slimani	Coritiba FC	2023

=== Canada ===
Player	Club(s)	Period
Chakib Hocine	HFX Wanderers, Valour FC	2019, 2020
Mohamed Farsi	Cavalry	2020–21

=== Canada/United States ===
Player	Club(s)	Period
Raïs M'Bolhi	Philadelphia Union	2014–15
Saphir Taïder	Montreal Impact	2018–20
Monsef Bakrar	New York City	2023–
Mohamed Farsi	Columbus Crew	2022–

=== China PR ===
Player	Club(s)	Period
Karim Benounes	Zhejiang Lucheng	2008

=== Egypt ===
Player	Club(s)	Period
Mohamed Amine Aoudia	Zamalek	2011–12
Amir Sayoud	Al Ahly	2008–12
Boualem Bouferma	Tersana	2003, 2006–08
Kamel Kaci-Saïd	Zamalek	1994–97
Redouane Cherifi	Ismaily	2020–21
Rezki Hamroune	Pharco FC	2021–
Ahmed Kendouci	Al Ahly SC	2023–
Abderrahim Deghmoum	Al Masry SC	2022–
Mohammed Benkhemassa	Ismaily	2022

=== Iran ===
Player	Club(s)	Period
Okacha Hamzaoui	Tractor	2020
Alexis Guendouz	Persepolis	2024–

=== Iraq ===
Player	Club(s)	Period
Lahouari Touil	Al-Zawraa SC	2021–22

=== Kuwait ===
Player	Club(s)	Period
Rachid Amrane	Al Qadsia Kuwait	2002–03
Akram Djahnit	Al-Arabi SC	2015
Lazhar Hadj Aïssa	Al Qadsia Kuwait	2011–12
Karim Matmour	Al-Arabi SC	2015
Amir Sayoud	Al-Arabi SC	2010
Tarek Bouabta	Al-Arabi SC	2022–23
Ilyes Yaiche	Al Qadsia Kuwait	2022–23
Ahmed Khaldi	Al-Arabi SC	2023–24
Sofiane Bouchar	Al-Arabi SC	2023–

=== Libya ===
Player	Club(s)	Period
Abdelmadjid Tahraoui	Asswehly	2009–2010
Nordine Sam	Al-Nasr Benghazi	2010–2011

=== Mexico ===
Player	Club(s)	Period
Andy Delort	Tigres UANL	2016–17

=== Morocco ===
Player	Club(s)	Period
Nacerdine Drid	Raja Casablanca	1988–89
Benbella Benmiloud	FUS Rabat, Hassania Agadir	1988–90, 1990–94
Mokhtar Kechamli	Hassania US Agadir	1993–94
Tahar Chérif El-Ouazzani	Raja Casablanca	1993–95
Abdesslam Benabdellah	Wydad Casablanca	1997–99
Hamza Yacef	Wydad Casablanca	2007–08
Yassine Boukhari	KAC Kenitra	2008–09
Farès Mecheri	Wydad Casablanca	2009
Oussama Darfalou	Maghreb de Fès	2022
Aziz Benabdi	Hassania US Agadir	2022
Abdelraouf Benguit	Raja Casablanca	2022–23
Toufik Moussaoui	Olympique Khouribga	2022–23
Badreddine Souyed	Mouloudia Oujda	2021–22
Houcine Benayada	Wydad AC	2022–23
Abdellah El Moudene	Mouloudia Oujda, Ittihad Tanger	2020–21, 2021–
Walid Bencherifa	Olympique Khouribga, IR Tanger	2021–23, 2023–
Gaya Merbah	Raja Casablanca, IR Tanger	2022–, 2023–
Yousri Bouzok	Raja Casablanca	2022–
Zakaria Draoui	Wydad AC	2023–
Ilyes Chetti	Wydad AC	2023–

=== Oman ===
Player	Club(s)	Period
Karim Sadki	Al-Nasr SC (Salalah)	2010–011
Adel Bougueroua	Al-Nasr SC (Salalah)	2011–012
Yacine Kaboul	Al-Nasr SC (Salalah)	2011–012
Billel Bensaha	Al-Nahda	2023–
Oussama Aggar	Oman	2024
Yazid Rahmoun	Oman	2024

=== Qatar ===
Player	Club(s)	Period
Lakhdar Adjali	Al-Rayyan	2002–03
Samir Amirèche	Al-Gharafa	2007–08
Rachid Amrane	Al-Gharafa	2001–02
Adel Habib Beldi	Lekhwiya	2010–12
Ilias Hassani	Al Kharaitiyat	2019
Nadir Belhadj	Al Sadd, Al-Sailiya	2010–16, 2017–21
Sofiane Hanni	Al-Gharafa, Al Ahli SC	2019–22, 2022–23
Adlène Guedioura	Al-Gharafa	2019–21
Mehdi Tahrat	Al-Gharafa	2021–22
Ayoub Azzi	Umm Salal, Al-Arabi	2020, 2020–21
Youcef Belaïli	Qatar Club	2020–21
Djamel Benlamri	Qatar Club	2021–22
Boualem Mesmoudi	Al-Wakrah	2022
Walid Mesloub	Umm Salal	2020
Abdennour Belhocini	Umm Salal, Al-Wakrah	2020, 2021
Lakhdar Belloumi	Al-Arabi	1988
Djamel Belmadi	Al-Gharafa, Al Kharaitiyat	2003–04, 2004–05
Ali Benarbia	Al-Rayyan, Qatar Club	2003–05, 2005–06
Karim Benounes	Al Kharaitiyat	2004–05
Madjid Bougherra	Lekhwiya	2011–14
Noureddine Drioueche	Al-Arabi	2003–04
Billel Dziri	Al Sadd	2007
Kaled Gourmi	Al-Shahania	2016
Rafik Halliche	Qatar Club	2014–16
Jugurtha Hamroun	Al Sadd, Al Kharaitiyat, Qatar Club, Al-Markhiya	2016–19, 2018, 2019, 2022–23
Karim Kerkar	Al-Sailiya	2003–04
Rabah Madjer	Qatar Club	1991–92
Ahmed Reda Madouni	Al-Gharafa	2007–09
Yazid Mansouri	Al-Sailiya	2010–11
Mourad Meghni	Umm Salal, Al-Khor, Lekhwiya	2011–12, 2012, 2012
Mourad Satli	Umm Salal	2019
Mehdi Méniri	Al-Khor	2008
Hakim Saci	Umm Salal	2006–08
Rafik Saïfi	Al-Khor	2009
Abdelhafid Tasfaout	Al-Rayyan	2002–03
Mohamed Tiaïba	Al-Shahania	2016
Brahim Zafour	Al-Sailiya	2005–06
Karim Ziani	El Jaish, Al-Arabi	2011–13, 2013–14
Mohamed Benyettou	Al-Wakrah	2019–24
Farid Boulaya	Al-Gharafa	2022–24
Andy Delort	Umm Salal	2023–24
Baghdad Bounedjah	Al Sadd	2015–24
Yacine Brahimi	Al-Rayyan, Al-Gharafa	2019–22, 2022–
Victor Lekhal	Umm Salal	2023–

=== Japan ===
Player	Club(s)	Period
Aymen Tahar	Sagan Tosu	2016–17

=== Jordan ===
Player	Club(s)	Period
Adlen Griche	Shabab Al-Ordon Club	2009–10
Mohamed Yacine Si Keddour	Shabab Al-Ordon Club	2009–10
Billel Abdelkadous	Shabab Al-Ordon Club	2016–2017
Oussama Aggar	Shabab Al-Aqaba Club	2022
Abdelmalek Al-Saeedan	Al-Sareeh SC	2022
Abderraouf Alouaoui	Al-Sareeh SC	2022
Abdelmalek Meftahi	Ma'an SC, Shabab Al-Ordon SC	2023–24, 2024
Riyad Aidoudi	Shabab Al-Aqaba Club	2023
Walid Athmani	Ma'an SC	2023–24
Dhirar Bensaadallah	Ma'an SC	2023–24
Mounir Ait L'Hadi	Al-Salt SC	2024
Ziri Hammar	Al-Salt SC	2024

=== Saudi Arabia ===
Player	Club(s)	Period
Fathi Chebel	Al-Riyadh SC	1980–81
Mourad meziane	Al-Wehda	1992
Mokhtar Kechamli	Al-Wehda	1992–93
Tarek Hadj Adlane	Al-Wehda	1997–98
Ali Mezoued	Al-Qadisiyah	
Moussa Saïb	Al-Nassr	2000–01
Yacine Hima	Al-Watani	2007–08
Adel Maïza	Al-Ahli Jeddah	2008–09
Youcef Saïbi	Al-Ahli Jeddah	2009
Abdelmalek Ziaya	Ittihad Jeddah	2010–12
Antar Yahia	Al-Nassr	2011–12
Sofiane Harkat	Al-Qadisiyah	2011–12
Farid Cheklam	Najran	2011–15
Reda Benhadj Djillali	Najran	2012
Saïd Bouchouk	Al-Qadisiyah	2012
Ramzi Bourakba	Najran	2012
Hadj Bouguèche	Al-Qadisiyah, Al-Nassr, Al-Taawoun	2011–12, 2012, 2012–13
Mourad Delhoum	Al-Nassr	2014
Farid Mellouli	Al-Qadisiyah	2015
Sofiane Khelili	Ettifaq	2016
Mohamed Benyettou	Al-Shabab	2016–18
Azzedine Doukha	Ohod Club, Al-Raed	2017–18, 2018–21
Mohamed Boulaouidet	Ohod Club	2017–18
Nacereddine Khoualed	Ohod Club	2017–18
Ryad Kenniche	Al-Qadisiyah	2017
Bouazza Feham	Al-Wehda, Al-Hazem	2017, 2018
Abdelmoumene Djabou	Al-Nassr	2018
Mohamed Boulaouidet	Ohod Club	2018
Hicham Belkaroui	Al-Raed	2018–19
Ibrahim Chenihi	Al-Fateh, Damac	2018–19, 2020–21
Mohamed Namani	Al-Fateh	2018–19
Malik Asselah	Al-Hazem	2018–20, 2021–22
Raïs M'Bolhi	Ettifaq	2018–22
Youcef Belaïli	Al-Ahli Jeddah	2019–20
Mehdi Tahrat	Abha	2019–21
Zidane Mebarakou	Al-Wehda	2019
Mokhtar Belkhiter	Al-Qadsiah	2019
Abdelaziz Ali Guechi	Al-Adalah	2019
Carl Medjani	Ohod Club	2019
Chamseddine Rahmani	Damac	2019
Najib Ammari	Damac	2020
Salim Boukhanchouche	Abha	2020
Saphir Taïder	Al-Ain FC	2020–21
Ayoub Abdellaoui	Ettifaq	2021–22
Hillal Soudani	Al-Fateh, Damac	2021, 2021–23
Tayeb Meziani	Abha	2022–23
Djamel Benlamri	Al-Shabab, Khaleej FC	2016–20, 2022
Ryad Boudebouz	Al-Ahli	2023
Moustapha Zeghba	Al-Wehda, Damac	2019, 2020–24
Amir Sayoud	Al-Tai FC, Al-Raed	2021–23, 2023–
Farouk Chafaï	Damac	2020–
Sofiane Bendebka	Al-Fateh	2020–
Abdelkader Bedrane	Damac	2022–
Riyad Mahrez	Al-Ahli	2023–
Mehdi Abeid	Al-Raed	2024–
Houssem Aouar	Ittihad Jeddah	2024–

=== Singapore ===
Player	Club(s)	Period
Hamid Berguiga	Brunei DPMM	2009
Khaled Kharroubi	Étoile FC	2010
Ismael Benahmed	Tanjong Pagar United	2013

=== Sudan ===
Player	Club(s)	Period
Mohamed Boulaouidet	Al-Hilal Club	2019

=== Thailand ===
Player	Club(s)	Period
Khaled Kharroubi	Osotspa Saraburi, BEC Tero Sasana	2011, 2012
Otman Djellilahine	BEC Tero Sasana	2014
Jonathan Matijas	Songkhla United	2013

=== United Arab Emirates ===
Player	Club(s)	Period
Ishak Belfodil	Baniyas Club	2015–16
Mohamed El Amine Aouad	Hatta Club	2009
Yacine Bentalaa	Al Wasl Dubaï	1992–93
Olivier Boumelaha	Al-Ittihad Kalba	2004–05
Madjid Bougherra	Al-Fujairah	2014–16
Mohamed Benyettou	Al-Fujairah	2018–19
Rachid Aït-Atmane	Al-Fujairah	2021
Mehdi Abeid	Al-Nasr SC, Khor Fakkan	2021–22, 2022–
Oussama Amar	Al Wasl	2022–
Djamel Benlamri	Al Wasl	2023–
Abderrahmane Meziane	Al Ain	2019
Ismaël Bouzid	Baniyas Club	2012
Farid Ghazi	Baniyas Club	2001–02
Lazhar Hadj Aïssa	Al-Sharjah	2012–13
Karim Kerkar	Emirates Club, Ajman Club	2009–10, 2011–13
Mehdi Méniri	Al Dhafra	2010
Brahim Arafat Mezouar	Dubai	2004 & 2007
Moussa Saïb	Al Wasl Dubaï	2002–03
Toufik Zerara	Al Dhafra	2008–09
Hassan Yebda	Al-Fujairah	2014–15
Karim Ziani	Ajman Club, Al-Fujairah	2014–15, 2015

=== Réunion ===
Player	Club(s)	Period
Farid Kerkar	SS Dynamo, USS Tamponnaise, US Possession, FC Avirons, SS Gauloise	2000 & 2003, 2001, 2002, 2004, 2006
Mansour Boutabout	AS Excelsior	2011–12

=== Tunisia ===
Player	Club(s)	Period
Abdelaziz Ben Tifour	Espérance ST, CS Hammam-Lif	1945–46, 1946–48
Mustapha Ben Tifour	Espérance ST, CS Hammam-Lif	1945–46, 1946–48
Abdelkader Zerrar	CS Hammam-Lif	1952–57
Mokhtar Arribi	CS Hammam-Lif	1955–57
Abdelkader Ghalem	Club Africain	1957–63
Khaldi Hammadi	US Monastir, Stade Tunisien	1948–50, 1955–58
Hamid Zouba	US Monastir	1960–62
Mohamed Maouche	US Monastir	1961–62
Hassen Chabri	CS Hammam-Lif	1963–66
Malik Zorgane	US Monastir	1989–92
Fodil Megharia	Club Africain	1989–93
Abdelhakim Serrar	Etoile du Sahel, Olympique du Kef	1989–90, 1994–95
Amar Bernaoui	Olympique du Kef	1994–95
Larbi El Hadi	ES Zarzis	1991–94
Abdelhak Benchikha	ES Zarzis	1991–95
Kamel Kaci-Saïd	CS Hammam-Lif	1991–92
Kamel Adjas	US Monastir	1992–94
Amri Boujemâa	Olympique Béja	1992–93
Chérif Guettai	Olympique Béja	1992–93
Ahcène Medjbouri	EGS Gafsa	1992–93
Saïd Boutaleb	Club Africain, CA Bizertin	1993–94, 1994–95
Hakim Zane	Club Africain	1993–94
Abderrazak Djahnit	Etoile du Sahel	1993–94
Hamid Rahmouni	Stade Tunisien	1993–94
Mourad Djahmoune	CS Sfaxien	1993–95
Abderrazak Belgherbi	CS Sfaxien	1993–95
Hamid Bahloul	JS Kairouan, ES Jerba	1997–98, 1998–99
Fayçal Guettouche	ES Zarzis	1994–95
Salim Fennazi	AS Marsa	1995–96
Mohamed Brahimi	CS Sfaxien	1996–97
Sid Ahmed Zerrouki	CS Sfaxien	1996–97
Tarek Lazizi	Stade Tunisien	1996–98
Rezki Amrouche	Club Africain	1997–2000
Samir Amirèche	Etoile du Sahel	1998–99
Billel Dziri	Étoile du Sahel	1998–99
Omar Bouazza Krachai	Stade Tunisien, CS Hammam-Lif	1997–98, 1998–2000
Fares Djabelkheir	Stade Tunisien	2001–02
Farid Ghazi	Olympique Beja	2004–05
Abdelmalek Cherrad	Espérance ST	2004
Bouabdellah Daoud	Espérance ST	2004–05
Karim Ghazi	Espérance ST	2004–05
Fouad Bouguerra	Club Africain	2006–07
Sofiane Attaf	EGS Gafsa, Jendouba Sport	2007–08, 2008–09
Amine Dahar	Étoile du Sahel, ES Hammam-Sousse	2005–06, 2008–09
Laid Belhamel	EGS Gafsa	2010–11
Sofiane Bencharif	Olympique Béja, JS Kairouan	2010, 2010–11
Merouane Dahar	Étoile du Sahel	2010–12
Abdelmalek Ziaya	CA Bizertin	2012–13
Khaled Lemmouchia	Club Africain	2012–13
Antar Yahia	Espérance ST	2013
Abdelmoumene Djabou	Club Africain	2012–15
Baghdad Bounedjah	Étoile du Sahel	2013–15
Habib Bellaïd	CS Sfaxien	2014
Kaddour Beldjilali	Etoile du Sahel	2014–15
Hicham Belkaroui	Club Africain, Espérance ST	2014–16, 2016–17
Hamid Djaouchi	Club Africain	2015
Ibrahim Chenihi	Club Africain	2015–18
Mokhtar Belkhiter	Club Africain	2016–19
Mansour Benothmane	Club Africain	2016–18
Abdelaziz Ali Guechi	AS Gabès	2016–18
Hameur Bouazza	Etoile du Sahel	2017
Youcef Belaïli	Espérance ST	2012–14 & 2018–19
Karim Aribi	Etoile du Sahel	2018–20
Djilani Benchenane	US Tataouine	2019
Moulay Abdelaziz Abdelkader	US Tataouine	2019
Raouf Benguit	Espérance ST	2019–21
Billel Bensaha	Espérance ST	2019–21
Karim Aribi	Etoile du Sahel	2019–20
Salim Boukhenchouche	Etoile du Sahel	2019–20
Mohamed Islam Bakir	CS Sfaxien	2019–20
Rachid Aït-Atmane	CS Sfaxien	2019–20
Abdelkader Bedrane	Espérance ST	2019–22
Ilyes Chetti	Espérance ST	2019–22
Sofiane Khelili	US Ben Guerdane	2019–20
Abderrahmane Meziane	Espérance ST	2020–21
Anis Allali	Olympique Beja, ES Metlaoui	2020–21, 2021–22
Redouane Zerdoum	Etoile du Sahel, Club Africain	2020–21, 2021–22
Nadir Korichi	CS Sfaxien, US Tataouine	2019, 2020
Zakaria Benchaâ	CS Sfaxien	2020
Zakaria Mansouri	CS Sfaxien	2020–21
Sabri Cheraitia	CS Sfaxien	2020–21
Mohamed Attia	AS Soliman, US Tataouine	2019–20, 2020–21
Ryad Kenniche	US Tataouine	2020
Lyes Benyoucef	Etoile du Sahel	2021–22
Boualem Mesmoudi	Etoile du Sahel	2021–22
Malik Raiah	CS Sfaxien	2021–22
Abdennour Belhocini	Club Africain	2021–23
Nabil Lamara	Club Africain	2021–23
Hichem Nekkache	CS Sfaxien	2021–22
Mohamed Amine Tougai	Espérance ST	2020–
Riad Benayad	Espérance ST	2022–
Tayeb Meziani	Espérance ST, Étoile du Sahel, Club Africain	2018–21, 2021–22, 2023–
Toufik Cherifi	Club Africain	2022–
Houssam Ghacha	Espérance ST	2023–

=== South Africa ===
Player	Club(s)	Period
Farès Hachi	Mamelodi Sundowns, Chippa United, Maritzburg United	2017–18, 2018, 2020–22

== League statistics rest of the world ==
List of Algerian players with 100 or more appearances
R.	Player	Rest of the world Club(s)	Apps
1	Baghdad Bounedjah	(Tunisia) Étoile du Sahel (49) – (Qatar) Al Sadd (157) – Al-Shamal (36)	242
2	Nadir Belhadj	(Qatar) Al-Sadd (137) – Al-Sailiya (85)	222
3	Mohamed Benyettou	(Saudi Arabia) Al-Shabab (57) – (United Arab Emirates) Al-Fujairah (24) – (Qatar) Al-Wakrah (102)	183
4	Farouk Chafaï	(Saudi Arabia) Damac (155)	155
5	Abdelkader Bedrane	(Tunisia) Espérance de Tunis (44) – (Saudi Arabia) Damac (106)	150
6	Amir Sayoud	(Egypt) Al Ahly (12) – Ismaily (1) – (Kuwait) Al Arabi (6) – (Tunisia) CS Sfaxien (12) – (Saudi Arabia) Al-Tai (48) – Al-Raed (54) – Al-Hazem FC (19)	149
7	Sofiane Bendebka	(Saudi Arabia) Al-Fateh (145)	145
8	Mohamed Farsi	(Canada) Cavalry (36) – (United States) Columbus Crew (91)	127
9	Yacine Brahimi	(Qatar) Al-Rayyan (56) – Al-Gharafa (69)	125
10	Youcef Belaïli	(Tunisia) Espérance de Tunis (88) – (Saudi Arabia) Al Ahli Saudi (13) – Qatar SC (22)	123
11	Moustapha Zeghba	(Saudi Arabia) Al-Wehda (11) – Damac (111)	122
12	Ibrahim Chenihi	(Tunisia) Club Africain (52) – (Saudi Arabia) Al-Fateh (38) – Damac (25)	115
13	Raïs M'Bolhi	(United States) Philadelphia Union (9) – (Saudi Arabia) Al-Ettifaq (104)	113
14	Azzedine Doukha	(Saudi Arabia) Ohod Club (26) – Al-Raed (82)	108
15	Walid Bencherifa	(Morocco) Olympique Khouribga (55) – IR Tanger (48)	103
16	Djamel Benlamri	(Saudi Arabia) Al-Shabab (67) – Khaleej FC (9) – Qatar SC (16) – (United Arab Emirates) Al Wasl (9)	101
17	Mohamed Amine Tougai	(Tunisia) Espérance de Tunis (100) – (Libya) Al Ahli SC (0)	100

List of Algerian players with 50 or more goals
R.	Player	Rest of the world Club(s)	Goals
1	Baghdad Bounedjah	(Tunisia) Étoile du Sahel (26) – (Qatar) Al Sadd (150) – Al-Shamal (25)	201
2	Mohamed Benyettou	(Saudi Arabia) Al-Shabab (22) – (United Arab Emirates) Al-Fujairah (14) – (Qatar) Al-Wakrah (51)	87
3	Yacine Brahimi	(Qatar) Al-Rayyan (25) – Al-Gharafa (43) – (Saudi Arabia) Abha Club (0)	68
4	Farid Kerkar	(Réunion) SS Dynamo (16) – USS Tamponnaise (12) – US Possession (19) – FC Avirons (9) – SS Gauloise (1)	57

As of 22 July 2026

== Algerian players in the rest of the world intercontinental Competitions ==
Bold Still playing competitive football in the rest of the world

List of Algerian players with 20 or more appearances in the rest of the world intercontinental competitions
#	Name	Games				Date of debut	Debut against	Date of last match	Final match against
#	Name	C1^{1}	C3^{2}	C4^{3}	TOTAL	Date of debut	Debut against	Date of last match	Final match against
1	Baghdad Bounedjah	45	21	3	69	3 Aug 2013	(Ethiopia) Saint George	4 Dec 2023	(Uzbekistan) Nasaf
2	Youcef Belaïli	43	–	3	46	20 Jul 2012	(Algeria) ASO Chlef	17 Feb 2020	(Iran) Esteghlal
3	Mohamed Amine Tougai	33	2	–	44	13 Feb 2021	(Senegal) Teungueth	20 Apr 2024	(South Africa) Mamelodi Sundowns
4	Nadir Belhadj	36	–	3	39	12 Feb 2011	(Saudi Arabia) Al-Ittihad	28 Jan 2020	(Iran) Shahr Khodro
5	Ilyes Chetti	25	–	3	28	15 Sep 2019	(Chad) Elect-Sport	2 Mar 2024	(Ivory Coast) ASEC Mimosas
6	Abdelkader Bedrane	26	–	2	28	15 Sep 2019	(Chad) Elect-Sport	22 Apr 2022	(Algeria) ES Sétif
7	Raouf Benguit	24	–	3	27	15 Sep 2019	(Chad) Elect-Sport	7 March 2023	(Guinea) Horoya AC
8	Madjid Bougherra	21	–	–	21	7 Mar 2012	(Saudi Arabia) Al-Ahli FC	22 Apr 2014	(Iran) Tractor Sazi

List of Algerian players with 10 or more goals in the rest of the world intercontinental competitions
#	Name	Goals				Date of debut	Debut against	Date of last goal	Final goal against
#	Name	C1^{1}	C3^{2}	C4^{3}	TOTAL	Date of debut	Debut against	Date of last goal	Final goal against
1	Baghdad Bounedjah	27	13	3	43	3 Aug 2013	(Ethiopia) Saint George	4 Dec 2023	(Uzbekistan) Nasaf
2	Youcef Belaïli	12	–	2	14	3 Aug 2013	(Cameroon) Coton Sport	28 Jan 2020	(Tajikistan) Istiklol
3	Riyad Mahrez	12	–	–	12	30 Sep 2024	(United Arab Emirates) Al Wasl	4 Nov 2025	(Qatar) Al Sadd SC
3	Karim Aribi	11	1	–	12	23 Apr 2019	(Sudan) Al-Hilal	7 Mar 2020	(Morocco) Wydad Casablanca

^{1} ^{Includes the CAF Champions League, African Football League, CONCACAF Champions League and AFC Champions League.} ^{2} ^{Includes the CAF Confederation Cup and AFC Cup.} ^{3} ^{Includes the CAF Super Cup and FIFA Club World Cup.}

As of 26 April 2024

== List of Algerian players hat-tricks in the rest of the world Leagues ==
Position key: GK – Goalkeeper; DF – Defender; MF – Midfielder; FW – Forward; ^{4} – Player scored four goals; ^{5} – Player scored five goals; ^{7} – Player scored seven goals; * – The home team

Player	Position	For	Against	Result	Date	League	Ref
Farid Kerkar^{4}	FW	Stade Tamponnaise*	Jeanne d'Arc	6–1	25 March 2001	Réunion Premier League	
Farid Kerkar	FW	Stade Tamponnaise*	SS Dynamo	3–1	6 May 2001	Réunion Premier League	
Rachid Amrane	FW	Al-Ittihad	Al-Arabi*	3–1	25 April 2002	Qatar Stars League	
Hadj Bouguèche	FW	Al-Qadisiyah	Al-Fateh*	6–1	14 October 2011	Saudi Professional League	
Mansour Boutabout	FW	AS Excelsior*	US Bénédictine	4–0	22 October 2011	Réunion Premier League	
Ismaël Benahmed	FW	Tanjong Pagar United	Young Lions*	4–0	17 April 2013	S.League	
Baghdad Bounedjah	FW	Étoile Sportive du Sahel	EGS Gafsa*	3–0	25 September 2014	Tunisian Ligue 1	
Mohamed Benyettou	FW	Al-Shabab*	Al-Ahli	3–2	18 September 2016	Saudi Professional League	
Baghdad Bounedjah	FW	Al Sadd	Al-Rayyan*	5–0	7 December 2016	Qatar Stars League	
Baghdad Bounedjah^{5}	FW	Al Sadd*	Al-Arabi	7–0	16 February 2017	Qatar Stars League	
Baghdad Bounedjah^{4}	FW	Al Sadd*	Al-Ahli	5–0	25 February 2018	Qatar Stars League	
Baghdad Bounedjah	FW	Al Sadd	Al-Kharaitiyat*	6–0	5 August 2018	Qatar Stars League	
Baghdad Bounedjah^{7}	FW	Al Sadd*	Al-Arabi	10–1	12 August 2018	Qatar Stars League	
Baghdad Bounedjah	FW	Al Sadd*	Al-Kharaitiyat	7–1	8 November 2018	Qatar Stars League	
Baghdad Bounedjah	FW	Al Sadd	Al-Gharafa*	8–1	2 December 2018	Qatar Stars League	
Baghdad Bounedjah	FW	Al Sadd*	Qatar	8–1	28 February 2019	Qatar Stars League	
Baghdad Bounedjah	FW	Al Sadd*	Al-Ahli	7–2	4 April 2019	Qatar Stars League	
Mohamed Benyettou	FW	Al-Fujairah	Al Dhafra*	5–1	10 May 2019	UAE Pro-League	
Baghdad Bounedjah^{4}	FW	Al Sadd	Al-Shahania*	7–1	31 August 2019	Qatar Stars League	
Yacine Brahimi	MF	Al-Rayyan	Umm Salal*	4–0	3 January 2020	Qatar Stars League	
Youcef Belaïli	FW	Qatar SC	Al-Ahli*	4–1	23 December 2020	Qatar Stars League	
Baghdad Bounedjah^{4}	FW	Al Sadd*	Al-Sailiya	8–0	7 January 2021	Qatar Stars League	
Baghdad Bounedjah	FW	Al Sadd*	Al-Duhail	3–1	12 January 2021	Qatar Stars League	
Farouk Chafaï	DF	Damac	Abha*	4–3	21 March 2021	Saudi Professional League	
Tayeb Meziani	FW	Étoile Sportive du Sahel	US Tataouine*	3–1	21 March 2021	Tunisian Ligue 1	
Andy Delort	FW	Umm Salal	Muaither*	3–1	2 November 2023	Qatar Stars League	
Baghdad Bounedjah	FW	Al Sadd*	Al-Rayyan	4–0	9 December 2023	Qatar Stars League	
Yousri Bouzok	FW	Raja CA*	IR Tanger	6–1	28 December 2023	Botola	
Yacine Brahimi	MF	Al-Gharafa	Al-Duhail*	4–1	1 March 2024	Qatar Stars League	
Baghdad Bounedjah	FW	Al Sadd	Al-Ahli*	9–1	17 April 2024	Qatar Stars League	
Baghdad Bounedjah	FW	Al-Shamal*	Al-Arabi	5–2	19 October 2024	Qatar Stars League	

List of Algerian players hat-tricks in intercontinental competitions

Player	Position	For	Against	Result	Date	League	Ref
Ibrahim Chenihi^{4}	MF	Club Africain*	RSLAF FC	9–1	12 March 2017	CAF Confederation Cup	
Karim Aribi^{4}	FW	Étoile Sportive du Sahel*	Hafia	7–1	24 August 2019	CAF Champions League	
Baghdad Bounedjah	FW	Al Sadd*	Al-Faisaly	6–0	23 October 2023	AFC Champions League	
Youcef Belaïli	FW	Espérance de Tunis*	Dekedaha FC	8–0	21 September 2024	CAF Champions League	

=== Multiple hat-tricks ===
Rank	Player	Hat-tricks	Last hat-trick
1	Baghdad Bounedjah	17	19 October 2024
2	Mohamed Benyettou	2	10 May 2019
2	Farid Kerkar	2	6 May 2001
2	Yacine Brahimi	2	1 March 2024
2	Youcef Belaïli	2	21 September 2024
6	Hadj Bouguèche	1	14 October 2011
6	Rachid Amrane	1	25 April 2002
6	Mansour Boutabout	1	26 October 2011
6	Ibrahim Chenihi	1	12 March 2017
6	Karim Aribi	1	24 August 2019
6	Farouk Chafaï	1	21 March 2021
6	Tayeb Meziani	1	21 March 2021
6	Andy Delort	1	2 November 2023
6	Yousri Bouzok	1	28 December 2023

=== By Leagues ===
R.	League	Hat-tricks	Last hat-trick
1	Qatar Stars League	20	19 October 2024
2	Réunion Premier League	3	22 October 2011
=	Saudi Professional League	3	21 March 2021
4	Ligue 1	2	21 March 2021
=	CAF Champions League	2	21 September 2024
6	UAE Pro-League	1	10 May 2019
=	Botola	1	28 December 2023
=	CAF Confederation Cup	1	12 March 2017
=	AFC Champions League	1	23 October 2023

== List All-time top goalscorers in All the rest of the world Competitions ==
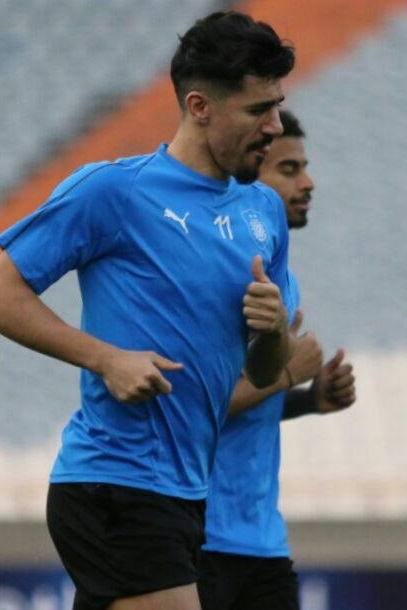
Baghdad Bounedjah best Algerian scorer in all competitions in the rest of the world with 284 goals.

List of Algerian players with 50 or more goals
R.	Player	League	Cup	Other	Continental	TOTAL
1	Baghdad Bounedjah	194	31	20	39	284
2	Mohamed Benyettou	87	6	19	–	112
3	Yacine Brahimi	60	9	5	4	78
4	Youcef Belaïli	37	8	1	21	67
5	Farid Kerkar	57	3	–	2	62
6	Sofiane Hanni	32	2	14	3	51

As of 1 June 2025

== Algerian players' titles in the rest of the world clubs ==
Bold Still playing competitive football In the rest of the world League

#	Name	League	Cup	Others	International	TOTAL
1	Baghdad Bounedjah	(Qatar) 2019, 2021, 2022, 2024	(Tunisia) 2013, 2014, 2015 (Qatar) 2017, 2020, 2021, 2024	(Qatar) 2017, 2017, 2020, 2021	(Tunisia) 2015	16
2	Youcef Belaïli	(Tunisia) 2012, 2014, 2018, 2019, 2025	(Tunisia) 2025	(Tunisia) 2019, 2024, 2025	(Tunisia) 2018, 2019	11
3	Mohamed Amine Tougai	(Tunisia) 2020, 2021, 2022, 2024, 2025	(Tunisia) 2025	(Tunisia) 2020, 2021, 2024, 2025		10
4	Nadir Belhadj	(Qatar) 2013	(Qatar) 2014, 2015	(Qatar) 2010, 2014, 2021, 2021	(Qatar) 2011	8
5	Abdelkader Zerrar	(Tunisia) 1954, 1955, 1956	(Tunisia) 1954, 1955			5
=	Abdelkader Bedrane	(Tunisia) 2020, 2021, 2022		(Tunisia) 2020, 2021		5
=	Ilyes Chetti	(Tunisia) 2020, 2021, 2022		(Tunisia) 2020, 2021		5
=	Fodil Megharia	(Tunisia) 1990, 1992	(Tunisia) 1992		(Tunisia) 1991, 1992 (Note: Includes the Afro-Asian Club Championship)	5
=	Samy Frioui	(Bahrain) 2023, 2024 , 2026	(Bahrain) 2026	(Bahrain) 2022		5
10	Rachid Amrane	(Qatar) 2002 (Kuwait) 2003	(Qatar) 2002 (Kuwait) 2003			4
=	Ahmed Kendouci	(Egypt) 2023	(Egypt) 2022	(Egypt) 2022	(Egypt) 2023	4
=	Tarek Bouabta	(Bahrain) 2024		(Kuwait) 2022, 2022, 2023		4
13	Khaldi Hammadi	(Tunisia) 1957	(Tunisia) 1956, 1958			3
=	Hicham Belkaroui	(Tunisia) 2015, 2017	(Tunisia) 2016			3
=	Raouf Benguit	(Tunisia) 2020, 2021		(Tunisia) 2020		3
=	Abderrahmane Meziane	(Tunisia) 2020, 2021		(Tunisia) 2020		3
=	Madjid Bougherra	(Qatar) 2012, 2014		(Qatar) 2013		3
=	Tayeb Meziani	(Tunisia) 2019		(Tunisia) 2019	(Tunisia) 2019	3
=	Jugurtha Hamroun		(Qatar) 2017	(Qatar) 2017, 2017		3
=	Billel Dziri		(Qatar) 2007	(Qatar) 2007	(Tunisia) 1998	3
=	Rachid Boumessous	(Bahrain) 2024	(Bahrain) 2025	(Bahrain) 2024		3
=	Rezki Amrouche		(Tunisia) 1998, 2000		(Tunisia) 1997	3
=	Ismaïl Belkacemi	(Libya) 2025	(Libya) 2025	(Libya) 2025		3
=	Riyad Mahrez			(Saudi Arabia) 2025	(Saudi Arabia) 2025 , 2026	3
25	Lazhar Hadj Aïssa	(Kuwait) 2012	(Kuwait) 2012			2
=	Billel Bensaha	(Tunisia) 2020		(Tunisia) 2020		2
=	Mourad Delhoum	(Saudi Arabia) 2014		(Saudi Arabia) 2014		2
=	Khaled Kharroubi	(Singapore) 2010		(Singapore) 2010		2
=	Youcef Atal	(Qatar) 2025		(Qatar) 2025		2
=	Abdessamed Bounacer	(Qatar) 2025		(Qatar) 2025		2
=	Karim Boudjema	(Singapore) 2010		(Singapore) 2010		2
=	Nordine Talhi	(Singapore) 2010		(Singapore) 2010		2
=	Mansour Lakehal	(Singapore) 2010		(Singapore) 2010		2
=	Yousri Bouzok	(Morocco) 2024	(Morocco) 2024			2
=	Houssem Aouar	(Saudi Arabia) 2025	(Saudi Arabia) 2025			2
=	Riad Benayad	(Morocco) 2024	(Morocco) 2024			2
=	Andy Delort	(Mexico) 2016		(Qatar) 2024		2
=	Mohamed Farsi	(United States) 2023			(United States) 2024	2
=	Ali Benarbia		(Qatar) 2001, 2004			2
=	Mokhtar Belkhiter		(Tunisia) 2017, 2018			2
=	Abdelaziz Ben Tifour		(Tunisia) 1947, 1948			2
=	Mustapha Ben Tifour		(Tunisia) 1947, 1948			2
=	Karim Kerkar		(United Arab Emirates) 2010	(United Arab Emirates) 2010		2
=	Kamel Kaci-Saïd				(Egypt) 1996, 1997	2
=	Fares Djabelkheir			(Tunisia) 2002	(Tunisia) 2001	2
=	Abbas Jabar	(Morocco) 1969	(Morocco) 1970			2
=	Mahmoud Tijani Ben Ammar	(Tunisia) 1964	(Tunisia) 1965.			2
=	Victor Lekhal			(Qatar) 2024, (Kuwait) 2026		2
=	Yacine Brahimi		(Qatar) 2025 , 2026			2
#	Name	League	Cup	Others	International	TOTAL
50	Nacerdine Drid				(Morocco) 1989	1
=	Karim Aribi				(Tunisia) 2019	1
=	Amir Sayoud	(Egypt) 2011				1
=	Ahmed Reda Madouni	(Qatar) 2008				1
=	Toufik Cherifi	(Tunisia) 2026				1
=	Houssam Ghacha	(Tunisia) 2024				1
=	Zineddine Boutmène	(Tunisia) 2023				1
=	Abdelmoumene Djabou	(Tunisia) 2015				1
=	Karim Ghazi	(Tunisia) 2004				1
=	Mokhtar Arribi	(Tunisia) 1956				1
=	Samir Amirèche	(Qatar) 2008				1
=	Djamel Belmadi	(Qatar) 2005				1
=	Idir Mokeddem	(Iraq) 2026				1
=	Mokhtar Brahim Adda		(Morocco) 1995			1
=	Abdesslam Benabdellah		(Morocco) 1998			1
=	Amri Boujemâa		(Tunisia) 1993			1
=	Chérif Guettai		(Tunisia) 1993			1
=	Zakaria Mansouri		(Tunisia) 2021			1
=	Sabri Cheraitia		(Tunisia) 2021			1
=	Imaddine Azzi		(Kuwait) 2022			1
=	Djamel Chettal		(Kuwait) 2022			1
=	Mansour Benothmane		(Tunisia) 2018			1
=	Mohamed Islam Bakir		(Tunisia) 2019			1
=	Saphir Taïder		(Canada) 2019			1
=	Abdelmalek Ziaya		(Saudi Arabia) 2010			1
=	Ibrahim Chenihi		(Tunisia) 2017			1
=	Kouceila Boualia		(Tunisia) 2026			1
=	Karim Ziani			(Qatar) 2013		1
=	Naïm Laidouni			(Qatar) 2024		1
=	Lahouari Touil			(Iraq) 2021		1
=	Abdelhakim Amokrane			(Tunisia) 2021		1
=	Otman Djellilahine			(Thailand) 2014		1
=	Hamid Berguiga			(Singapore) 2009		1
=	Hadj Bouguèche			(United Arab Emirates) 2010		1
=	Billel Abdelkadous			(Jordan) 2016		1
=	Nasreddine Zaâlani			(Bahrain) 2024		1
=	Oussama Bellatreche			(Bahrain) 2024		1
=	Sofiane Bouchar			(Kuwait) 2026		1
=	Abderrahim Deghmoum			(Egypt) 2026		1
=	Mounder Temine			(Egypt) 2026		1

== Summary ==
=== List by League ===
R.	League	Titles	Winning Years
1	(Tunisia) Ligue 1	34	1954, 1955, 1956 x2, 1990, 1992, 2004, 2012, 2014, 2015 x2, 2017, 2018, 2019 x2, 2020 x6, 2021 x5, 2022 x3, 2023, 2024 x2, 2025 x2
2	Qatar Stars League	11	2002, 2005, 2008 x2, 2012, 2013, 2014, 2019, 2021, 2022, 2024
3	(Kuwait) Premier League	2	2003, 2012
=	(Saudi Arabia) Saudi Professional League	2	2014, 2025
=	(Bahrain) Bahraini Premier League	2	2023, 2024
=	(Egypt) Premier League	2	2011, 2023
=	(Morocco) Botola	2	2024 x2
8	(Singapore) S.League	1	2010
=	(Mexico) Liga MX	1	2016
=	(United States) MLS Cup	1	2023

=== List by Cup ===
R.	Cup	Titles	Winning Years
1	(Tunisia) Tunisian Cup	22	1947 x2, 1948 x2, 1954, 1955, 1992, 1993, 1998, 2000, 2014, 2015, 2016, 2017 x2, 2018 x2, 2019, 2021 x2, 2025 x2
2	Emir of Qatar Cup	10	2002, 2007, 2014, 2015, 2017 x2, 2020, 2021, 2024, 2025
3	Kuwait Emir Cup	4	2003, 2012, 2022 x2
4	(Morocco) Coupe du Trône	3	1998, 2024 x2
5	(Saudi Arabia) King Cup of Champions	2	2010, 2025
6	(United Arab Emirates) UAE President's Cup	1	2010
=	(Canada) Canadian Championship	1	2019
=	Egypt Cup	1	2022

=== List by League Cup ===
R.	Cups	Titles	Winning Years
1	Qatar Crown Prince Cup	8	2007, 2013, 2017 x2, 2020, 2021, 2025 x2
2	Singapore League Cup	2	2009, 2010
=	Kuwait Crown Prince Cup	2	2022, 2023
4	(Saudi Arabia) Saudi Crown Prince Cup (defunct)	1	2014
=	(Tunisia) Tunisian Coupe de la Ligue (defunct)	1	2002
=	(Thailand) Thai League Cup	1	2014

=== List by Super Cup ===
R.	Super Cup	Titles	Winning Years
1	(Tunisia) Tunisian Super Cup	16	2019 x2, 2020 x6, 2021, 2021 x3, 2024 x2, 2025 x2
2	(Qatar) Qatari Super Cup	3	2014, 2017 x2
3	(United Arab Emirates) Arabian Gulf Super Cup	2	2010 x2
4	(Iraq) Iraqi Super Cup	1	2021
=	(Bahrain) Bahraini Super Cup	1	2022
=	Kuwait Super Cup	1	2022
=	(Egypt) Egyptian Super Cup	1	2022
=	(Saudi Arabia) Saudi Super Cup	1	2025

=== List by intercontinental Cup in rest of the world ===
R.	Intercontinental Cup	Titles	Winning Years
1	CAF Champions League	7	1989, 1991, 1996, 2018, 2019 x2, 2023
2	CAF Super Cup	2	1997, 1998
=	Arab Club Champions Cup	2	1997, 2019
=	AFC Champions League	2	2011, 2025
5	CAF Confederation Cup	1	2015
=	Afro-Asian Championship (defunct)	1	1992
=	Arab Cup Winners' Cup(defunct)	1	2001
=	Leagues Cup	1	2024

== List of top Algerian goalscorers in the rest of the world ==
Rank	player	Titles	League Top goalscorers Years
1	Baghdad Bounedjah	3	(Tunisia) 2014 (14 goals), (Etoile du Sahel), (Qatar) 2019 (39 goals), 2021 (21 goals), (Al Sadd)
2	Rachid Amrane	1	(Qatar) 2002 (16 goals), (Al Ittihad Doha)
=	Farid Kerkar	1	(Réunion) 2002 (19 goals), (US Possession)
=	Abdelmoumene Djabou	1	(Tunisia) 2013 (8 goals), (Club Africain)
=	Yacine Brahimi	1	(Qatar) 2020 (15 goals), (Al Rayyan)
=	Yousri Bouzok	1	(Morocco) 2024 (14 goals), (Raja CA)
=	Rabah Madjer	1	1992 (8 goals), (Qatar)

== See also ==
- Category:Algeria men's international footballers

== Notes ==
- ^{m} Czechoslovakia (TCH, 1918–1992) split into the Czech Republic (CZE, 1993–present) and Slovakia (SVK, 1993–present).
1. Born in France
2. Born in Netherlands
3. Capped for the France national under-18 football team
4. Capped for the France national under-19 football team
5. Capped for the France national under-20 football team
6. Capped for the France national under-21 football team
7. Capped for the France national under-17 football team
8. Capped for the France national under-16 football team
9. Born in Morocco
10. Capped for the France national football team
11. Capped for the Belgium national under-18 football team
12. Capped for the Belgium national under-19 football team
13. Capped for the Belgium national under-21 football team
