= 1990 African Cup of Nations final =

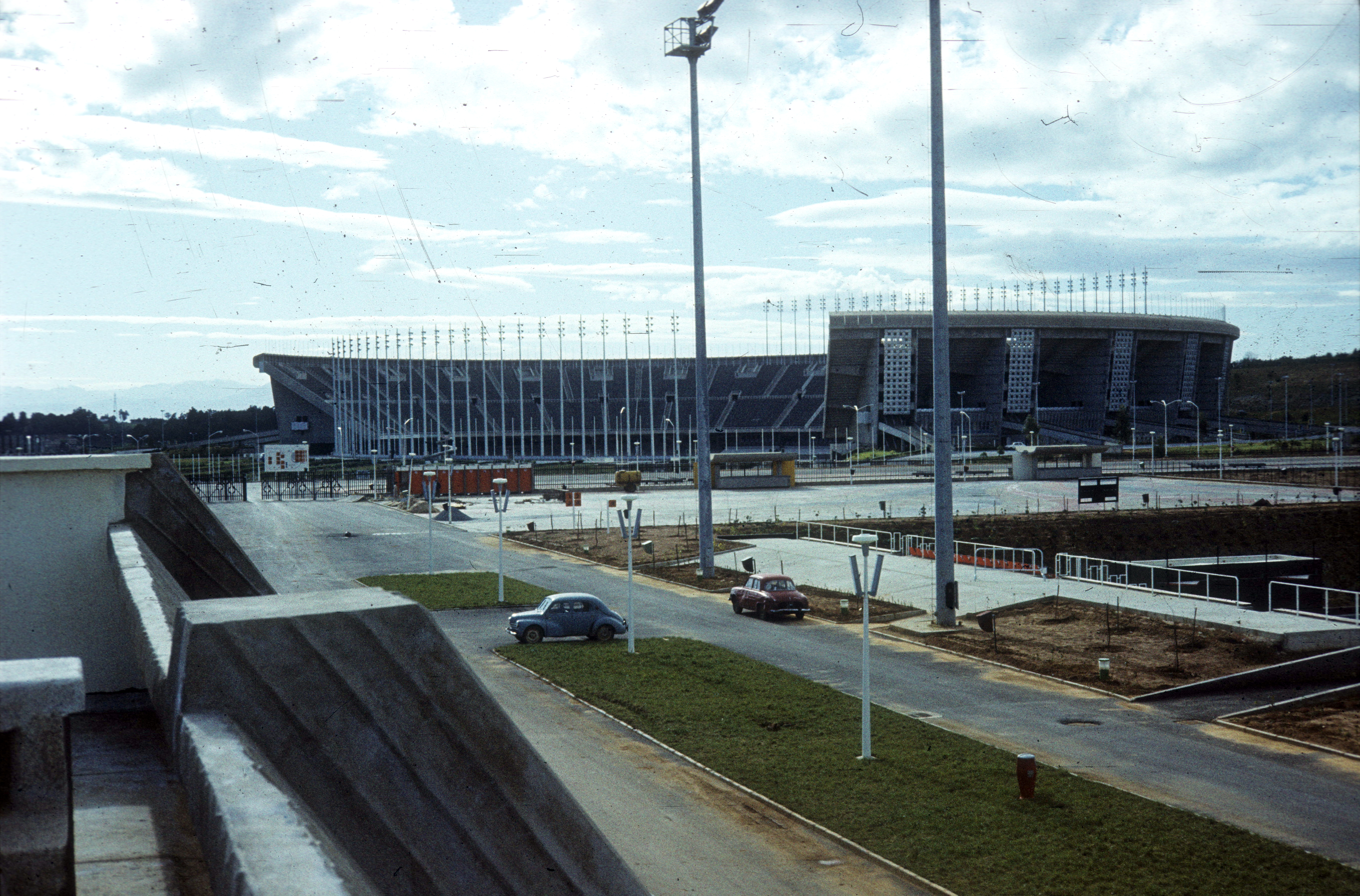
- Event: 1990 African Cup of Nations
Algeria	Nigeria
(Algeria)	(Nigeria)
1	0
- Date: 16 March 1990
- Venue: Stade 5 Juillet 1962, Algiers
- Referee: Jean-Fidèle Diramba (Gabon)
- Attendance: 105,032

The 1990 African Cup of Nations final was a football match that took place on 16 March 1990, at the Stade 5 Juillet 1962 in Algiers, Algeria, to determine the winner of the 1990 African Cup of Nations. Algeria defeated Nigeria 1–0 with a lone goal from Chérif Oudjani in the 38th minute to win their first African Cup. The final was a repeat of the 1980 final in Lagos, which Nigeria won 3–0.

== Road to the final ==
Algeria		Nigeria	
Opponents	Results	Opponents	Results
Group stage
Nigeria	5-1	Algeria	1–5
Ivory Coast	3–0	Egypt	1–0
Egypt	2–0	Ivory Coast	1–0
Semi-finals
Senegal	1–0	Zambia	2–0

== Match ==
=== Details ===
16 March 1990
16:00 UTC+1

Algeria	1–0	Nigeria
Oudjani 38'	Report

Stade du 5 Juillet, Algiers
Attendance: 105,032
Referee: Jean-Fidèle Diramba (Gabon)

Algeria	Nigeria

GK	22	Antar Osmani
RB	5	Messaoud Aït Abderrahmane
CB	4	Ali Benhalima
CB	20	Fodil Megharia
LB	15	Abdelhakim Serrar
CM	14	Tahar Chérif El-Ouazzani		(substituted off) 85'
CM	8	Djamel Amani	(yellow card) 62'
CM	18	Moussa Saïb
RW	11	Rabah Madjer (c)
CF	10	Chérif Oudjani		(substituted off) 90'
LW	9	Djamel Menad
Substitutions:
GK	16	Kamel Kadri
DF	19	Tarek Lazizi
MF	6	Mahieddine Meftah		(substituted on) 85'
FW	12	Nacer Bouiche
FW	17	Mohamed Rahim		(substituted on) 90'
Manager:
Abdelhamid Kermali

GK	1	Alloysius Agu (c)
RB	4	Uche Okechukwu
CB	19	Isaac Semitoje
CB	13	Herbert Anijekwu
LB	3	Andrew Uwe		(substituted off) 13'
CM	8	Moses Kpakor
CM	6	Thompson Oliha	(yellow card) 31'
CM	10	Emmanuel Okocha
RW	7	Ayodele Ogunlana		(substituted off) 69'
CF	9	Rashidi Yekini
LW	17	Friday Elahor	(yellow card) 44'
Substitutions:
GK	18	Christian Obi
DF	2	Aminu Abdul		(substituted on) 13'
MF	11	Ademola Adeshina
MF	20	Baldwin Bazuaye
FW	14	Daniel Amokachi		(substituted on) 69'
Manager:
(Netherlands) Clemens Westerhof

Assistant referees:
Abdelali Naciri (Morocco)
Idrissa Sarr (Mauritania)
