= Algeria at the Africa Cup of Nations =

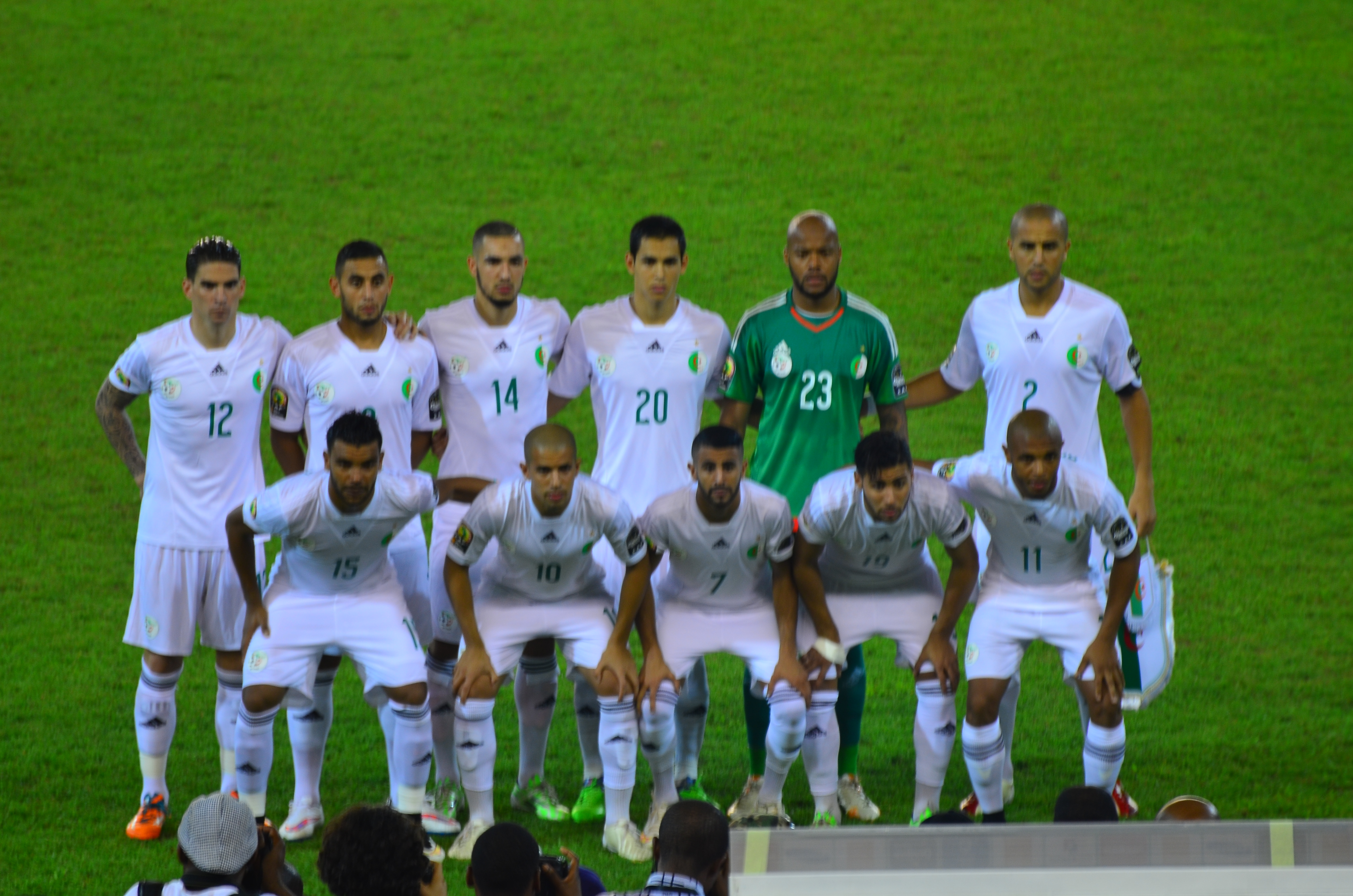
Algeria national football team In the Africa Cup of Nations 2015.

Algeria have appeared in the finals of the Africa Cup of Nations on twenty occasions. The side's first participation was in 1968 in Ethiopia. Algeria has won the cup twice: the first time was when they hosted the tournament in 1990, and they won a second title in the 2019 edition, held in Egypt. Algeria also finished second in the 1980 edition, held in Nigeria, and third in the 1984 and 1988 editions, held in Ivory Coast and Morocco respectively.

== Overall record ==
Africa Cup of Nations record										Africa Cup of Nations qualification record						
Appearances: 21										Appearances: 28						
Year	Round	Position	Pld	W	D	L	GF	GA	Squad	Result	Pld	W	D	L	GF	GA
(Sudan) 1957	Part of France									Part of France						
(United Arab Republic) 1959	Part of France									Part of France						
(Ethiopia) 1962	Part of France									Part of France						
(Ghana) 1963	Did not enter									Did not enter						
(Tunisia) 1965	Did not enter									Did not enter						
(Ethiopia) 1968	Group stage	6th	3	1	0	2	5	6	Squad	Round 1 (final)	4	4	0	0	9	2
(Sudan) 1970	Did not qualify									Round 2 (final)	4	1	1	2	3	3
(Cameroon) 1972	Did not qualify									Round 1	2	1	0	1	3	4
(Egypt) 1974	Did not qualify									Round 2 (final)	2	0	1	1	2	3
(Ethiopia) 1976	Did not qualify									Round 1	2	0	1	1	2	3
(Ghana) 1978	Did not qualify									Round 2 (final)	4	2	0	2	7	5
(Nigeria) 1980	Runners-up	2nd	5	2	2	1	6	7	Squad	Round 2 (final)	2	1	0	1	3	2
(Libya) 1982	Fourth place	4th	5	2	1	2	5	6	Squad	Round 2 (final)	4	2	1	1	13	5
(Ivory Coast) 1984	Third place	3rd	5	3	2	0	8	1	Squad	Round 2 (final)	4	2	2	0	10	4
(Egypt) 1986	Group stage	6th	3	0	2	1	2	3	Squad	Round 2 (final)	4	2	2	0	8	1
(Morocco) 1988	Third place	3rd	5	1	3	1	4	4	Squad	Round 2 (final)	2	1	1	0	2	1
(Algeria) 1990	Champions	1st	5	5	0	0	13	2	Squad	Qualified as hosts						
(Senegal) 1992	Group stage	10th	2	0	1	1	1	4	Squad	Qualified as holders						
(Tunisia) 1994	Disqualified after qualification									Round 1 (final)	6	4	1	1	13	4
(South Africa) 1996	Quarter-finals	5th	4	2	1	1	5	3	Squad	Round 1 (final)	10	4	5	1	12	7
(Burkina Faso) 1998	Group stage	15th	3	0	0	3	2	5	Squad	Round 1 (final)	6	3	1	2	9	5
(Ghana) (Nigeria) 2000	Quarter-finals	6th	4	1	2	1	5	4	Squad	Round 1 (final)	8	4	1	3	14	8
(Mali) 2002	Group stage	15th	3	0	1	2	2	5	Squad	Round 1 (final)	6	3	2	1	9	7
(Tunisia) 2004	Quarter-finals	8th	4	1	1	2	5	7	Squad	Round 1 (final)	4	3	1	0	6	1
(Egypt) 2006	Did not qualify									Round 2 (final)	14	3	5	4	15	15
(Ghana) 2008	Did not qualify									Round 1 (final)	6	2	2	2	6	6
(Angola) 2010	Fourth place	4th	6	2	1	3	4	10	Squad	Round 3 (final)	12	7	2	3	16	8
(Gabon) (Equatorial Guinea) 2012	Did not qualify									Round 1 (final)	6	2	2	2	5	8
(South Africa) 2013	Group stage	13th	3	0	1	2	2	5	Squad	Round 2 (final)	4	4	0	0	9	2
(Equatorial Guinea) 2015	Quarter-finals	6th	4	2	0	2	6	5	Squad	Round 3 (final)	6	5	0	1	11	4
(Gabon) 2017	Group stage	10th	3	0	2	1	5	6	Squad	Round 1 (final)	6	5	1	0	25	5
(Egypt) 2019	Champions	1st	7	6	1	0	13	2	Squad	Round 1 (final)	6	3	2	1	9	4
(Cameroon) 2021	Group stage	21st	3	0	1	2	1	4	Squad	Round 1 (final)	6	4	2	0	19	6
(Ivory Coast) 2023	Group stage	18th	3	0	2	1	3	4	Squad	Round 1 (final)	6	5	1	0	9	2
(Morocco) 2025	Quarter-finals	5th	5	4	0	1	8	3	Squad	Round 1 (final)	6	5	1	0	16	2
(Kenya) (Tanzania) (Uganda) 2027	To be determined									To be determined						
Total	2 Titles	21/35	85	32	24	29	105	96	—	28/35	150	82	38	30	265	127

== By match ==
By match
Tournament	Round	Opponent	Score	Result	Algeria scorers	Man of the match
1968	Group stage	Ivory Coast	0–3	L		
1968	Group stage	Uganda	4–0	W	Lalmas (3), Kalem	Lalmas
1968	Group stage	Ethiopia	1–3	L	Amirouche	
1980	Group stage	Ghana	0–0	D		
1980	Group stage	Morocco	1–0	W	Belloumi	
1980	Group stage	Guinea	3–2	W	Bensaoula (2), Belloumi	
1980	Semi-finals	Egypt	2–2 (4–2 p)	D	Assad, Benmiloudi	
1980	Final	Nigeria	0–3	L		
1982	Group stage	Zambia	1–0	W	Merzekane	
1982	Group stage	Nigeria	2–1	W	Isima 44' (o.g.), Assad	
1982	Group stage	Ethiopia	0–0	D		
1982	Semi-finals	Ghana	2–3 (a.e.t.)	L	Zidane, Assad	
1982	Third place match	Zambia	0–2	L		
1984	Group stage	Malawi	3–0	W	Bouiche, Belloumi, Fergani	Belloumi
1984	Group stage	Ghana	2–0	W	Menad, Bensaoula	
1984	Group stage	Nigeria	0–0	D		
1984	Semi-finals	Cameroon	0–0 (4–5 p)	D		
1984	Third place match	Egypt	3–1	W	Madjer, Belloumi, yahi	Belloumi
1986	Group stage	Morocco	0–0	D		
1986	Group stage	Zambia	0–0	D		
1986	Group stage	Cameroon	2–3	L	Madjer, Maroc	
1988	Group stage	Ivory Coast	1–1	D	Belloumi	
1988	Group stage	Morocco	0–1	L		
1988	Group stage	Zaire	1–0	W	Ferhaoui	
1988	Semi-finals	Nigeria	1–1 (8–9 p)	D	Maâtar	
1988	Third place match	Morocco	1–1 (4–3 p)	D	Belloumi	
1990	Group stage	Nigeria	5–1	W	Madjer (2), Menad (2), Amani	Madjer
1990	Group stage	Ivory Coast	3–0	W	Menad, Chérif El-Ouazzani, Oudjani	Chérif El-Ouazzani
1990	Group stage	Egypt	2–0	W	Amani, Saïb	
1990	Semi-finals	Senegal	2–1	W	Menad, Amani	
1990	Final	Nigeria	1–0	W	Oudjani	Chérif El-Ouazzani
1992	Group stage	Ivory Coast	0–3	L		
1992	Group stage	Congo	1–1	D	Bouiche	
1996	Group stage	Zambia	0–0	D		
1996	Group stage	Sierra Leone	2–0	W	Meçabih (2)	
1996	Group stage	Burkina Faso	2–1	W	Lounici, Dziri	
1996	Quarter-finals	South Africa	1–2	L	Lazizi	
1998	Group stage	Guinea	0–1	L		
1998	Group stage	Burkina Faso	1–2	L	Saïb	
1998	Group stage	Cameroon	1–2	L	Dziri	
2000	Group stage	DR Congo	0–0	D		
2000	Group stage	Gabon	3–1	W	Ghazi, Tasfaout, Dziri	
2000	Group stage	South Africa	1–1	D	Moussouni	
2000	Quarter-finals	Cameroon	1–2	L	Tasfaout	
2002	Group stage	Nigeria	0–1	L		
2002	Group stage	Liberia	2–2	D	Akrour, Kraouche	
2002	Group stage	Mali	0–2	L		
2004	Group stage	Cameroon	1–1	D	Zafour	
2004	Group stage	Egypt	2–1	W	Mamouni, Achiou	
2004	Group stage	Zimbabwe	1–2	L	Achiou	
2004	Quarter-finals	Morocco	1–3 (a.e.t.)	L	Cherrad	
2010	Group stage	Malawi	0–3	L		
2010	Group stage	Mali	1–0	W	Halliche	
2010	Group stage	Angola	0–0	D		
2010	Quarter-finals	Ivory Coast	3–2 (a.e.t.)	W	Matmour, Bougherra, Bouazza	
2010	Semi-finals	Egypt	0–4	L		
2010	Third place match	Nigeria	0–1	L		
2013	Group stage	Tunisia	0–1	L		
2013	Group stage	Togo	0–2	L		
2013	Group stage	Ivory Coast	2–2	D	Feghouli, Soudani	
2015	Group stage	South Africa	3–1	W	Hlatshwayo (o.g.), Ghoulam, Slimani	Ghoulam
2015	Group stage	Ghana	0–1	L		
2015	Group stage	Senegal	2–0	W	Mahrez, Bentaleb	Mahrez
2015	Quarter-finals	Ivory Coast	1–3	L	Soudani	
2017	Group stage	Zimbabwe	2–2	D	Mahrez (2)	Mahrez
2017	Group stage	Tunisia	1–2	L	Hanni	
2017	Group stage	Senegal	2–2	D	Slimani (2)	Slimani
2019	Group stage	Kenya	2–0	W	Bounedjah, Mahrez	Bennacer
2019	Group stage	Senegal	1–0	W	Belaïli	Bennacer
2019	Group stage	Tanzania	3–0	W	Ounas (2), Slimani	Ounas
2019	Round of 16	Guinea	3–0	W	Belaïli, Mahrez, Ounas	Mahrez
2019	Quarter-finals	Ivory Coast	1–1 (4–3 p)	D	Feghouli	
2019	Semi-finals	Nigeria	2–1	W	Troost-Ekong (o.g.), Mahrez	Mahrez
2019	Final	Senegal	1–0	W	Bounedjah	M'Bolhi
2021	Group stage	Sierra Leone	0–0	D		
2021	Group stage	Equatorial Guinea	0–1	L		
2021	Group stage	Ivory Coast	1–3	L	Bendebka	
2023	Group stage	Angola	1–1	D	Bounedjah	Chaïbi
2023	Group stage	Burkina Faso	2–2	D	Bounedjah (2)	Bounedjah
2023	Group stage	Mauritania	0–1	L		
2025	Group stage	Sudan	3–0	W	Mahrez (2), Maza	Mahrez
2025	Group stage	Burkina Faso	1–0	W	Mahrez	Maza
2025	Group stage	Equatorial Guinea	3–1	W	Belaïd, Chaïbi, Maza	Hadj Moussa
2025	Round of 16	DR Congo	1–0 (a.e.t.)	W	Boulbina	Boulbina
2025	Quarter-finals	Nigeria	0–2	L		

== Goalscorers ==
Rank	Player	1968	1980	1982	1984	1986	1988	1990	1992	1996	1998	2000	2002	2004	2010	2013	2015	2017	2019	2021	2023	2025	Goals
1	Riyad Mahrez																1	2	3	–	–	3	9
2	Lakhdar Belloumi		2	–	2		2																6
3	Baghdad Bounedjah																	–	2	–	3	–	5
3	Djamel Menad				1	–	–	4	–														5
5	Rabah Madjer		–	–	1	1		2	–														4
5	Islam Slimani															–	1	2	1	–	–		4
7	Djamel Amani							3															3
7	Salah Assad		1	2																			3
7	Tedj Bensaoula		2	–	1	–																	3
7	Billel Dziri									1	1	1	–										3
7	Hacène Lalmas	3																					3
7	Adam Ounas																		3	–	–		3
12	Hocine Achiou													2									2
12	Youcef Belaïli																		2	–	–		2
12	Sofiane Feghouli															1	–		1	–	–		2
12	Ibrahim Maza																					2	2
12	Ali Meçabih									2		–											2
12	Chérif Oudjani							2															2
12	Moussa Saïb							1	–	–	1	–											2
12	El Arbi Hillel Soudani															1	1	–					2
12	Abdelhafid Tasfaout								–	–	–	2	–										2
21	Nassim Akrour												1	–									1
21	Boualem Amirouche	1																					1
21	Zineddine Belaïd																					1	1
21	Sofiane Bendebka																			1			1
21	Hocine Benmiloudi		1																				1
21	Nabil Bentaleb																1	–			–		1
21	Hameur Bouazza														1	–							1
21	Madjid Bougherra														1		–						1
21	Nacer Bouiche					–		–	1														1
21	Nasser Bouiche				1	–																	1
21	Adil Boulbina																					1	1
21	Farès Chaïbi																				–	1	1
21	Tahar Chérif El-Ouazzani							1	–	–													1
21	Abdelmalek Cherrad													1									1
21	Ali Fergani		–	–	1	–																	1
21	Abdelkader Ferhaoui						1																1
21	Farid Ghazi											1	–										1
21	Faouzi Ghoulam																1	–					1
21	Rafik Halliche														1	–	–		–				1
21	Sofiane Hanni																	1					1
21	Mokhtar Kalem	1																					1
21	Nasreddine Kraouche												1	–									1
21	Tarek Lazizi							–		1													1
21	Khaled Lounici									1													1
21	Rachid Maâtar						1																1
21	Mamar Mamouni											–		1									1
21	Karim Maroc			–		1																	1
21	Karim Matmour														1								1
21	Chaâbane Merzekane		–	1		–	–																1
21	Fawzi Moussouni											1											1
21	Hocine Yahi			–	1	–	–																1
21	Brahim Zafour												–	1									1
21	Djamel Zidane			1																			1
Total		5	6	5*	8	2	4	13	1	5	2	5	2	5	4	2	6*	5	13*	1	3	8	105

– Best goalscorer(s) of the tournament
– Best goalscorer(s) of the team
* – Own goal

== Most appearances ==
Rank	Player	Matches	Years
1	Riyad Mahrez	24	2015, 2017, 2019, 2021, 2023, 2025
1	Aïssa Mandi	24	2015, 2017, 2019, 2021, 2023, 2025
3	Rabah Madjer	22	1980, 1982, 1984, 1986, 1990, 1992
4	Baghdad Bounedjah	19	2017, 2019, 2021, 2023, 2025
5	Rais M'Bohli	18	2013, 2015, 2017, 2019, 2021, 2023
5	Islam Slimani	18	2013, 2015, 2017, 2019, 2021, 2023
5	Lakhdar Belloumi	18	1980, 1982, 1984, 1988
8	Djamel Menad	17	1984, 1986, 1988, 1990, 1992
8	Moussa Saïb	17	1990, 1992, 1996, 1998, 2000
8	Ramy Bensebaini	17	2017, 2019, 2021, 2023, 2025
11	Mahieddine Meftah	16	1990, 1992, 1996, 1998, 2000, 2002
11	Sofiane Feghouli	16	2013, 2015 , 2019, 2021, 2023
11	Ali Fergani	16	1980, 1982, 1984, 1986
11	Hocine Yahi	16	1982, 1984, 1986, 1988
15	Billel Dziri	15	1996, 1998, 2000, 2002
16	Mehdi Cerbah	14	1980, 1982, 1984, 1986
16	Chaâbane Merzekane	14	1980, 1982, 1986, 1988
18	Fodil Megharia	13	1986, 1988, 1990, 1992
18	Ismaël Bennacer	13	2017, 2019, 2021, 2023, 2025
18	Adlène Guedioura	13	2013, 2017, 2019
21	Yacine Brahimi	12	2015, 2017, 2019, 2021
21	Youcef Belaïli	12	2019, 2021, 2023
23	Abdelhafid Tasfaout	11	1992, 1998, 2000, 2002
23	Youcef Atal	11	2019, 2021, 2023, 2025
23	Tedj Bensaoula	11	1980, 1984, 1986
23	Mahmoud Guendouz	11	1980, 1984, 1986
23	Tahar Chérif El-Ouazzani	11	1990, 1992, 1996

== See also ==
- Algeria at the FIFA World Cup
