= 1986 FIFA World Cup Group D =

Football tournament group stage

Group D of the 1986 FIFA World Cup was one of the groups of nations competing at the 1986 FIFA World Cup. The group's first round of matches began on 1 June and its last matches were played on 12 June. Most matches were played at the Estadio Jalisco and the Estadio Tres de Marzo in Guadalajara. Undefeated Brazil, with three clean slate shutouts, topped the group; Spain finished second. Both teams advanced to the second round. Northern Ireland and Algeria were the other two teams in the group.

== Standings ==
Pos	Team	Pld	W	D	L	GF	GA	GD	Pts	Qualification
1	Brazil	3	3	0	0	5	0	+5	6	Advance to knockout stage
2	Spain	3	2	0	1	5	2	+3	4	Advance to knockout stage
3	Northern Ireland	3	0	1	2	2	6	−4	1	
4	Algeria	3	0	1	2	1	5	−4	1	

Source: FIFA

== Matches ==
=== Spain vs Brazil ===
1 June 1986
12:00 CST

Spain	0–1	Brazil
		Sócrates 62'

Estadio Jalisco, Guadalajara
Attendance: 65,500 (Note: The FIFA technical report mistakenly interchanged the attendance data for the 1 June matches.)
Referee: Chris Bambridge (Australia)

Spain	Brazil

GK	1	Andoni Zubizarreta
RWB	2	Tomás
LWB	3	José Antonio Camacho (c)
DF	4	Antonio Maceda
DF	5	Víctor
DF	8	Andoni Goikoetxea
MF	11	Julio Alberto	(yellow card) 4'
MF	17	Francisco		(substituted off) 82'
MF	21	Míchel
FW	19	Julio Salinas
FW	9	Emilio Butragueño
Substitutions:
GK	13	Urruti
DF	6	Rafael Gordillo
MF	7	Juan Señor		(substituted on) 82'
DF	15	Chendo
FW	20	Eloy
Manager:
(Spain) Miguel Muñoz

GK	1	Carlos
RB	2	Édson
CB	14	Júlio César
CB	4	Edinho (c)
LB	17	Branco	(yellow card) 82'
DM	19	Elzo
CM	15	Alemão
CM	6	Júnior		(substituted off) 79'
AM	18	Sócrates
CF	8	Casagrande		(substituted off) 66'
CF	9	Careca
Substitutions:
GK	22	Leão
CB	3	Oscar
DM	5	Falcão		(substituted on) 79'
FW	7	Müller		(substituted on) 66'
AM	10	Zico
Manager:
(Brazil) Telê Santana

=== Algeria vs Northern Ireland ===
3 June 1986
12:00 CST

Algeria	1–1	Northern Ireland
Zidane 59'		Whiteside 6'

Estadio Tres de Marzo, Zapopan
Attendance: 22,000
Referee: Valeri Butenko (Soviet Union)

Algeria	Northern Ireland

GK	21	Larbi El Hadi
DF	2	Mahmoud Guendouz (c)
DF	4	Nourredine Kourichi
DF	5	Abdellah Liegeon
DF	16	Faouzi Mansouri	(yellow card) 36'
MF	6	Mohammed Kaci Said
MF	8	Karim Maroc
MF	18	Halim Benmabrouk
MF	14	Djamel Zidane		(substituted off) 71'
FW	7	Salah Assad
FW	11	Rabah Madjer		(substituted off) 33'
Substitutions:
GK	1	Nacerdine Drid
MF	10	Lakhdar Belloumi		(substituted on) 71'
FW	13	Rachid Harkouk		(substituted on) 33'
DF	19	Mohammed Chaib
DF	20	Fodil Megharia
Manager:
(Algeria) Rabah Saâdane

GK	1	Pat Jennings
DF	2	Jimmy Nicholl
DF	3	Mal Donaghy
DF	4	John O'Neill
DF	5	Alan McDonald
MF	15	Nigel Worthington	(yellow card) 58'
MF	6	David McCreery
MF	7	Steve Penney		(substituted off) 67'
MF	8	Sammy McIlroy (c)	(yellow card) 78'
MF	10	Norman Whiteside	(yellow card) 79'	(substituted off) 81'
FW	19	Billy Hamilton
Substitutions:
GK	12	Jim Platt
FW	11	Ian Stewart		(substituted on) 67'
MF	16	Paul Ramsey
FW	17	Colin Clarke		(substituted on) 81'
DF	18	John McClelland
Manager:
(Northern Ireland) Billy Bingham

=== Brazil vs Algeria ===
6 June 1986
12:00 CST

Brazil	1–0	Algeria
Careca 66'

Estadio Jalisco, Guadalajara
Attendance: 48,000
Referee: Rómulo Méndez (Guatemala)

Brazil	Algeria

GK	1	Carlos
RB	2	Édson	(substituted off) 10'
CB	14	Júlio César
CB	4	Edinho (c)
LB	17	Branco
DM	19	Elzo
CM	15	Alemão
CM	6	Júnior
AM	18	Sócrates
CF	8	Casagrande	(substituted off) 59'
CF	9	Careca
Substitutions:
GK	12	Paulo Vítor
CB	3	Oscar
DM	5	Falcão	(substituted on) 10'
FW	7	Müller	(substituted on) 59'
FW	11	Edivaldo
Manager:
(Brazil) Telê Santana

GK	1	Nacerdine Drid
DF	2	Mahmoud Guendouz (c)
DF	20	Fodil Megharia
DF	5	Abdellah Liegeon
DF	16	Faouzi Mansouri
MF	6	Mohammed Kaci Said
MF	18	Halim Benmabrouk
MF	10	Lakhdar Belloumi	(substituted off) 80'
FW	7	Salah Assad	(substituted off) 68'
FW	9	Djamel Menad
FW	11	Rabah Madjer
Substitutions:
GK	21	Larbi El Hadi
MF	8	Karim Maroc
FW	12	Tedj Bensaoula	(substituted on) 68'
MF	14	Djamel Zidane	(substituted on) 80'
DF	19	Mohammed Chaib
Manager:
(Algeria) Rabah Saâdane

=== Northern Ireland vs Spain ===
7 June 1986
12:00 CST

Northern Ireland	1–2	Spain
Clarke 46'		Butragueño 1'; Salinas 18'

Estadio Tres de Marzo, Zapopan
Attendance: 28,000
Referee: Horst Brummeier (Austria)

Northern Ireland	Spain

GK	1	Pat Jennings
DF	2	Jimmy Nicholl
DF	3	Mal Donaghy
DF	4	John O'Neill
DF	5	Alan McDonald
MF	15	Nigel Worthington		(substituted off) 70'
MF	6	David McCreery
MF	7	Steve Penney		(substituted off) 54'
MF	8	Sammy McIlroy (c)
MF	10	Norman Whiteside
FW	17	Colin Clarke
Substitutions:
FW	11	Ian Stewart		(substituted on) 54'
FW	19	Billy Hamilton	(yellow card) 85'	(substituted on) 70'
Manager:
(Northern Ireland) Billy Bingham

GK	1	Andoni Zubizarreta
DF	2	Tomás
DF	3	José Antonio Camacho (c)
DF	5	Víctor	(yellow card) 50'
DF	8	Andoni Goikoetxea
DF	14	Ricardo Gallego
MF	6	Rafael Gordillo		(substituted off) 54'
MF	17	Francisco
MF	21	Míchel
FW	19	Julio Salinas		(substituted off) 78'
FW	9	Emilio Butragueño
Substitutions:
MF	18	Ramón Calderé		(substituted on) 54'
MF	7	Juan Señor		(substituted on) 78'
Manager:
(Spain) Miguel Muñoz

=== Northern Ireland vs Brazil ===
12 June 1986
12:00 CST

Northern Ireland	0–3	Brazil
		Careca 15', 87'; Josimar 42'

Estadio Jalisco, Guadalajara
Attendance: 51,000
Referee: Siegfried Kirschen (East Germany)

Northern Ireland	Brazil

GK	1	Pat Jennings
DF	2	Jimmy Nicholl
DF	3	Mal Donaghy	(yellow card) 12'
DF	4	John O'Neill
DF	5	Alan McDonald
MF	21	David Campbell		(substituted off) 71'
MF	6	David McCreery
MF	8	Sammy McIlroy (c)
MF	10	Norman Whiteside		(substituted off) 67'
FW	11	Ian Stewart
FW	17	Colin Clarke
Substitutions:
GK	12	Jim Platt
FW	14	Gerry Armstrong		(substituted on) 71'
DF	15	Nigel Worthington
DF	18	John McClelland
FW	19	Billy Hamilton		(substituted on) 67'
Manager:
(Northern Ireland) Billy Bingham

GK	1	Carlos
RB	13	Josimar
CB	14	Júlio César
CB	4	Edinho (c)
LB	17	Branco
DM	19	Elzo
CM	15	Alemão
CM	6	Júnior
AM	18	Sócrates	(substituted off) 68'
SS	7	Müller	(substituted off) 27'
CF	9	Careca
Substitutions:
GK	22	Leão
CB	3	Oscar
CF	8	Casagrande	(substituted on) 27'
AM	10	Zico	(substituted on) 68'
AM	20	Silas
Manager:
(Brazil) Telê Santana

=== Algeria vs Spain ===
12 June 1986
12:00 CST

Algeria	0–3	Spain
		Calderé 15', 68'; Eloy 70'

Estadio Tecnológico, Monterrey
Attendance: 23,980
Referee: Shizuo Takada (Japan)

Algeria	Spain

GK	1	Nacerdine Drid		(substituted off) 20'
DF	2	Mahmoud Guendouz (c)
DF	20	Fodil Megharia
DF	4	Nourredine Kourichi
DF	16	Faouzi Mansouri
MF	6	Mohammed Kaci Said
MF	8	Karim Maroc
MF	10	Lakhdar Belloumi
MF	14	Djamel Zidane		(substituted off) 58'
FW	13	Rachid Harkouk
FW	11	Rabah Madjer	(yellow card) 33'
Substitutions:
GK	21	Larbi El Hadi		(substituted on) 20'
FW	9	Djamel Menad		(substituted on) 58'
Manager:
(Algeria) Rabah Saâdane

GK	1	Andoni Zubizarreta
DF	2	Tomás
DF	3	José Antonio Camacho (c)
DF	5	Víctor
DF	8	Andoni Goikoetxea	(yellow card) 89'
MF	14	Ricardo Gallego
MF	17	Francisco
MF	18	Ramón Calderé
MF	21	Míchel		(substituted off) 63'
FW	19	Julio Salinas
FW	9	Emilio Butragueño		(substituted off) 46'
Substitutions:
FW	20	Eloy		(substituted on) 46'
MF	7	Juan Señor		(substituted on) 63'
Manager:
(Spain) Miguel Muñoz

== See also ==
- Algeria at the FIFA World Cup
- Brazil at the FIFA World Cup
- Northern Ireland at the FIFA World Cup
- Spain at the FIFA World Cup
