= List of Algeria international footballers =

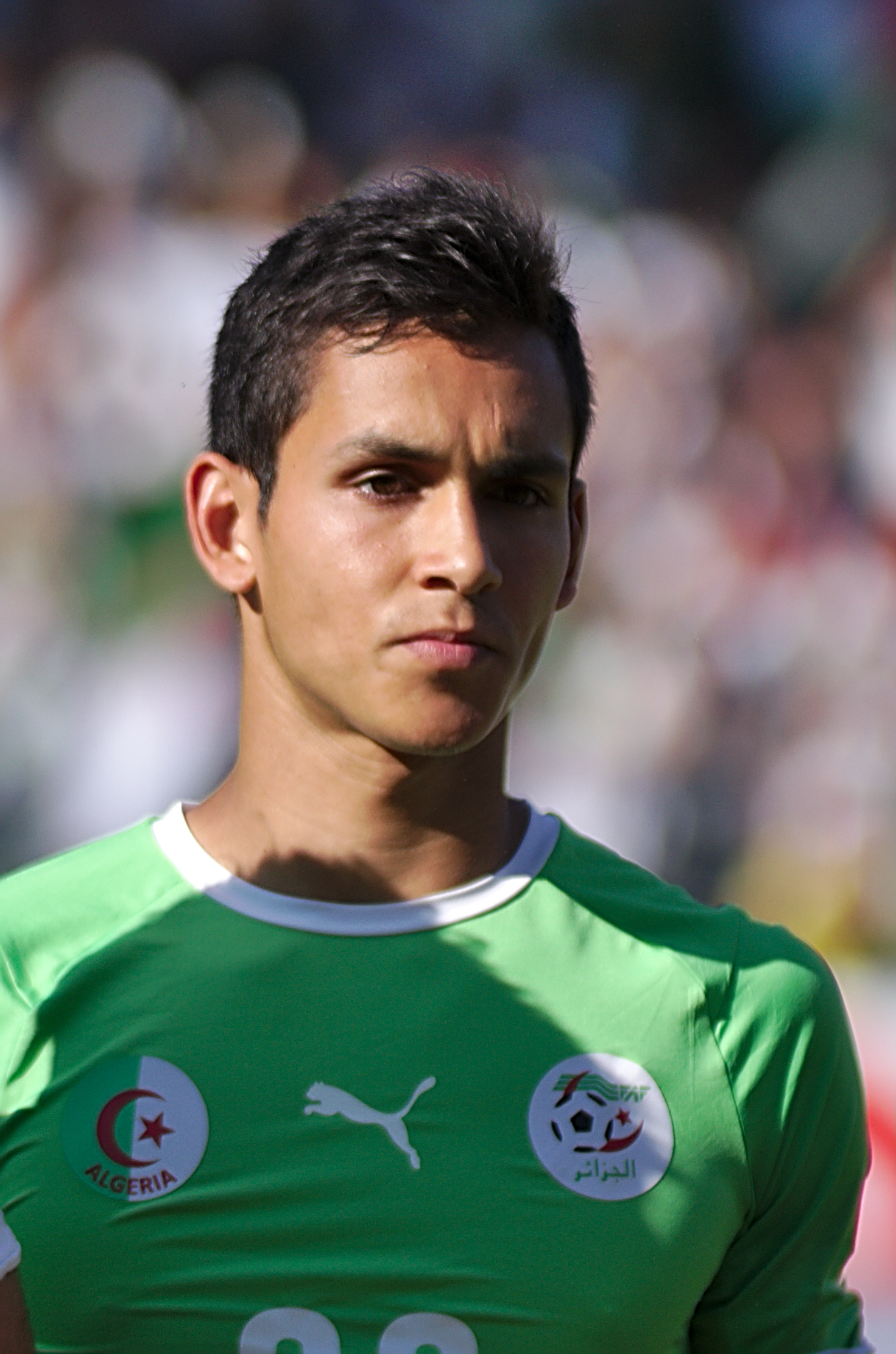
Aïssa Mandi is Algeria's most capped player.

The Algeria national football team represents the country of Algeria in international association football. It is fielded by Algerian Football Federation, the governing body of football in Algeria, and competes as a member of the Confederation of African Football (CAF), which encompasses the countries of Africa. Algeria competed in their first match on 6 January 1963, a 2–1 win with Bulgaria at Stade municipal. This table takes into account all official Algeria matches played up to and inclusion 2 July 2026 (Note: The friendly match between Algeria vs Togo A' January 5, 2024 are not official.).

Algeria have competed in numerous competitions, and all players who have played in 25 or more matches, either as a member of the starting eleven or as a substitute, are listed below. Each player's details include his playing position while with the team, the number of caps earned and goals scored in all international matches, and details of the first and most recent matches played in. The names are initially ordered by number of caps (in descending order), then by date of debut, then by alphabetical order. The Arab Cup has been organized since the 1960s, but it was not always held regularly nor under the direct supervision of FIFA. Starting from the Qatar 2021 edition, the tournament became official as it was fully organized by FIFA.

== Players ==
Key
§	Named to the national team in the past year (Note: Players considered active are the ones who have been called up for the national team in the last twelve months.)
^{+}	Played in team that won the Africa Cup of Nations
GK	Goalkeeper
DF	Defender
MF	Midfielder
FW	Forward
Bold	Still playing competitive football

Algeria national team football players with at least 25 appearances
Player	Position	Caps	Goals	Date of debut	Debut against	Date of last match	Final match against	Ref.
**Aïssa Mandi**	DF	122 +	8	5 Mar 2014	Slovenia	2 Jul 2026	Switzerland	
**Riyad Mahrez**	MF	119 +	40	31 May 2014	Armenia	2 Jul 2026	Switzerland	
Islam Slimani	FW	104 +	45	26 May 2012	Niger	9 Dec 2025	Iraq	
Lakhdar Belloumi	MF	100	27	22 Oct 1978	Malawi	17 Nov 1989	Egypt	
Raïs M'Bolhi	GK	96 +	0	28 May 2010	Republic of Ireland	19 Nov 2021	Sweden	
Abdelhafid Tasfaout	FW	87	36	15 Feb 1991	Cameroon	28 Jan 2002	Mali	
Billel Dziri	MF	87	9	23 Sep 1992	Tunisia	19 Jun 2005	Zimbabwe	
**Baghdad Bounedjah** ^{§}	FW	85 +	35	15 Nov 2014	Ethiopia	—	—	
**Ramy Bensebaini** ^{§}	DF	85 +	7	1 Jan 2017	Mauritania	—	—	
Sofiane Feghouli	MF	82 +	19	29 Feb 2012	Gambia	20 Jan 2024	Burkina Faso	
Rabah Madjer	FW	79 +	27	28 Oct 1978	Zambia	17 Jan 1992	Congo	
Mahieddine Meftah	DF	77 +	4	31 Dec 1989	Senegal	28 Jan 2002	Mali	
Djamel Menad	FW	75 +	25	31 May 1980	Sierra Leone	30 Jul 1995	Tanzania	
Mahmoud Guendouz	DF	74	4	17 Feb 1977	Kenya	12 Jun 1986	Spain	
**Yacine Brahimi**	MF	72 +	15	26 Mar 2013	Benin	6 June 2024	Guinea	
Madjid Bougherra	DF	70	4	20 Jun 2004	Zimbabwe	1 Feb 2015	Ivory Coast	
Salah Assad	FW	68	15	1 May 1977	Senegal	8 Feb 1989	Finland	
Fodil Megharia	DF	68 +	0	10 Oct 1984	East Germany	17 Jan 1992	Congo	
Yazid Mansouri	MF	67	0	6 Nov 2001	France	5 Jun 2010	United Arab Emirates	
Moussa Saïb	MF	65 +	7	7 Jan 1989	Zimbabwe	21 Apr 2001	Senegal	
Ali Fergani	MF	65	7	12 May 1973	Tunisia	25 Feb 1986	Mozambique	
**Nabil Bentaleb** ^{§}	MF	64	6	5 Mar 2014	Slovenia	—	—	
Rafik Saïfi	FW	64	18	5 Jun 1998	Bulgaria	23 Jun 2010	United States	
Mehdi Cerbah	GK	63	0	29 Aug 1975	Egypt	21 Feb 1986	Mauritania	
Karim Ziani	MF	62	5	12 Feb 2003	Belgium	3 Sep 2011	Tanzania	
Carl Medjani	DF	62	3	11 Aug 2010	Gabon	7 June 2018	Portugal	
Adlène Guedioura	MF	62 +	2	28 May 2010	Republic of Ireland	25 Mar 2022	Cameroon	
**Youcef Belaïli** ^{§}	MF	58 +	10	26 March 2015	Qatar	—	—	
**Hillel Soudani**	FW	56	24	4 Jun 2011	Morocco	25 Mar 2021	Zambia	
**Ismaël Bennacer** ^{§}	MF	56 +	3	4 Sep 2016	Lesotho	—	—	
Hocine Yahi	MF	56	8	7 Mar 1982	Zambia	26 Mar 1988	Morocco	
**Ramiz Zerrouki** ^{§}	MF	56	3	25 Mar 2021	Zambia	—	—	
**Youcef Atal** ^{§}	DF	54 +	2	6 Jun 2017	Guinea	—	—	
Nadir Belhadj	DF	54	4	28 Apr 2004	China	12 Nov 2011	Tunisia	
Tahar Chérif El-Ouazzani	MF	54 +	1	28 Dec 1984	Ghana	27 Jan 1996	South Africa	
Antar Yahia	DF	53	6	15 Jan 2004	Mali	29 Feb 2012	Gambia	
Mohamed Khedis	DF	52	0	4 Oct 1972	Turkey	27 Jul 1980	Yugoslavia	
Tedj Bensaoula	FW	51	20	9 Dec 1979	Morocco	6 Jun 1986	Brazil	
Mustapha Kouici	DF	49	3	8 Sep 1976	Libya	6 Jan 1984	Egypt	
Chaâbane Merzekane	DF	49	3	28 Oct 1978	Zambia	26 Mar 1988	Morocco	
Lounès Gaouaoui	GK	49	0	30 Dec 2001	Senegal	3 Mar 2010	Serbia	
Ali Bencheikh	MF	48	7	1 Nov 1976	Libya	1 May 1985	Tunisia	
Omar Betrouni	FW	48	4	26 Jun 1968	Guinea	28 Jul 1978	Nigeria	
Slimane Raho	DF	48	0	14 Aug 1998	Libya	3 Mar 2010	Serbia	
**Mohamed Amoura** ^{§}	FW	47	19	8 Oct 2021	Niger	—	—	
Mohamed Kaci-Said	MF	47	0	4 Dec 1980	China	16 Mar 1988	Morocco	
Saphir Taïder	MF	46	5	26 Mar 2013	Benin	26 Mar 2019	Tunisia	
Moulay Haddou	DF	46	1	4 Nov 1998	Bulgaria	29 Jan 2004	Egypt	
Miloud Hadefi	DF	46	1	17 Mar 1968	Morocco	22 Apr 1979	Mali	
Medhi Lacen	MF	44	0	3 Mar 2010	Serbia	26 Mar 2015	Qatar	
Nacerdine Drid	GK	44	0	19 Dec 1982	Tunisia	23 Mar 1988	Nigeria	
Hacène Lalmas	FW	42	14	6 Jan 1963	Bulgaria	31 Oct 1974	Morocco	
Rafik Halliche	DF	41 +	3	31 May 2008	Senegal	9 Sep 2019	Benin	
**Saïd Benrahma**	MF	40	4	13 Oct 2015	Senegal	8 Sep 2025	Guinea	
Tarek Lazizi	DF	39 +	2	5 Mar 1990	Ivory Coast	31 May 1997	Tunisia	
Nasreddine Kraouche	MF	38	3	6 Jun 1999	Tunisia	8 Oct 2005	Gabon	
Abdelmalek Ali Messaoud	DF	38	1	7 Apr 1974	Morocco	17 Nov 1978	Congo	
Mohamed Chaïb	DF	38	0	3 Apr 1981	Senegal	26 Mar 1988	Morocco	
Faouzi Ghoulam	DF	37	5	26 Mar 2013	Benin	5 Sep 2017	Zambia	
**Hicham Boudaoui** ^{§}	FW	36 +	0	27 Dec 2018	Qatar	—	—	
Djamel Mesbah	DF	35	1	28 May 2010	Republic of Ireland	1 Jan 2017	Mauritania	
**Farès Chaïbi** ^{§}	MF	34	3	23 Mar 2023	Niger	—	—	
Nasser Bouiche	MF	34	5	31 May 1981	Niger	14 Dec 1986	Ivory Coast	
Rezki Amrouche	DF	34	2	9 Oct 1992	Burundi	9 Jul 2000	Morocco	
Ali Attoui	FW	34	0	14 Mar 1965	Tunisia	11 Apr 1971	Mali	
**Rayan Aït-Nouri** ^{§}	DF	33	0	23 Mar 2023	Niger	—	—	
Rafik Djebbour	FW	33	5	15 Aug 2006	Gabon	5 Mar 2014	Slovenia	
Abdelaziz Safsafi	MF	33	3	16 Nov 1972	Tunisia	19 Nov 1980	Poland	
Bouzid Mahyouz	DF	33	0	24 Nov 1971	Libya	30 Oct 1981	Nigeria	
Djamel Benlamri	DF	32 +	2	17 Nov 2018	Togo	29 Mar 2022	Cameroon	
Abdelkader Horr	DF	31	2	2 Jul 1978	Iraq	18 Mar 1982	Zambia	
Karim Matmour	MF	31	2	7 Feb 2007	Libya	29 Feb 2012	Gambia	
Ali Dahleb	MF	31	2	26 Feb 1993	Ghana	24 Jan 1999	Tunisia	
Omar Belatoui	DF	31	1	10 Feb 1989	Malta	26 Nov 1995	Ivory Coast	
Abdelhamid Salhi	MF	31	1	19 Jul 1965	Ivory Coast	23 Mar 1975	Tunisia	
Mounir Zeghdoud	DF	31	0	26 Nov 1995	Ivory Coast	3 Jul 2004	Nigeria	
Hichem Mezaïr	GK	31	0	14 Aug 1998	Libya	28 Feb 2006	Burkina Faso	
**Mohamed Amine Tougai** ^{§}	FW	30	2	4 Dec 2021	Lebanon	—	—	
Nourredine Kourichi	DF	30	2	28 Dec 1980	Sudan	12 Jun 1986	Spain	
Sid Ahmed Zerrouki	MF	30	2	18 Jul 1993	Ivory Coast	20 Dec 1997	Egypt	
Maamar Mamouni	MF	30	2	6 Jun 1999	Tunisia	4 Sep 2005	Nigeria	
Tahar Benfarhat	MF	30	1	17 Mar 1968	Morocco	7 Apr 1974	Morocco	
Khaled Lounici	FW	29	3	17 Dec 1990	Senegal	24 Jan 1999	Tunisia	
Abdelkader Ighili	MF	28	6	29 Aug 1975	Egypt	17 Nov 1978	Congo	
Abdelkader Ghezzal	FW	28	3	18 Nov 2008	Mali	29 Feb 2012	Gambia	
Hassan Yebda	MF	28	2	11 Oct 2009	Rwanda	26 Jun 2014	Russia	
Brahim Zafour	DF	28	1	4 Nov 1998	Bulgaria	27 Mar 2005	Rwanda	
Hakim Medane	MF	28	1	28 Dec 1984	Ghana	14 Oct 1994	Sudan	
Salah Larbes	MF	28	0	13 Mar 1980	Morocco	24 Jun 1982	Chile	
Khaled Lemmouchia	MF	28	0	31 May 2008	Senegal	30 Jan 2013	Ivory Coast	
**Amine Gouiri** ^{§}	FW	27	11	12 Oct 2023	Cape Verde	—	—	
Ali Benhalima	DF	27 +	1	11 Dec 1986	Ivory Coast	17 Jan 1992	Congo	
Abdelhamid Sadmi	DF	27	0	11 Mar 1984	Nigeria	12 Apr 1987	Tunisia	
Kamel Adjas	DF	27 +	0	13 Nov 1988	Mali	13 Jan 1992	Ivory Coast	
Fayçal Hamdani	DF	27	0	3 Apr 1991	Morocco	9 Apr 1999	Liberia	
Hocine Achiou	MF	26	3	25 Jan 2003	Uganda	12 Aug 2009	Uruguay	
Djamel Djefdjef	MF	26	1	19 Dec 1982	Tunisia	14 Dec 1985	South Korea	
Yacine Slatni	DF	26	0	28 Feb 1999	Liberia	24 Sep 2003	Gabon	
**Ryad Boudebouz**	MF	25	2	28 May 2010	Republic of Ireland	6 Jun 2017	Guinea	
Djamel Keddou	DF	25	2	13 Aug 1973	United Arab Emirates	4 Jul 1978	Iraq	
Foued Kadir	MF	25	2	28 May 2010	Republic of Ireland	23 Jan 2015	Ghana	
Messaoud Belloucif	MF	25	0	1 Nov 1964	Soviet Union	29 Dec 1968	Tunisia	
Mehdi Mostefa	MF	25	0	17 Nov 2010	Luxembourg	30 Jun 2014	Germany	

== See also ==
- List of Algeria international footballers born outside Algeria
- Category:Algeria men's international footballers
