= Algeria at the FIFA World Cup =

International football delegation

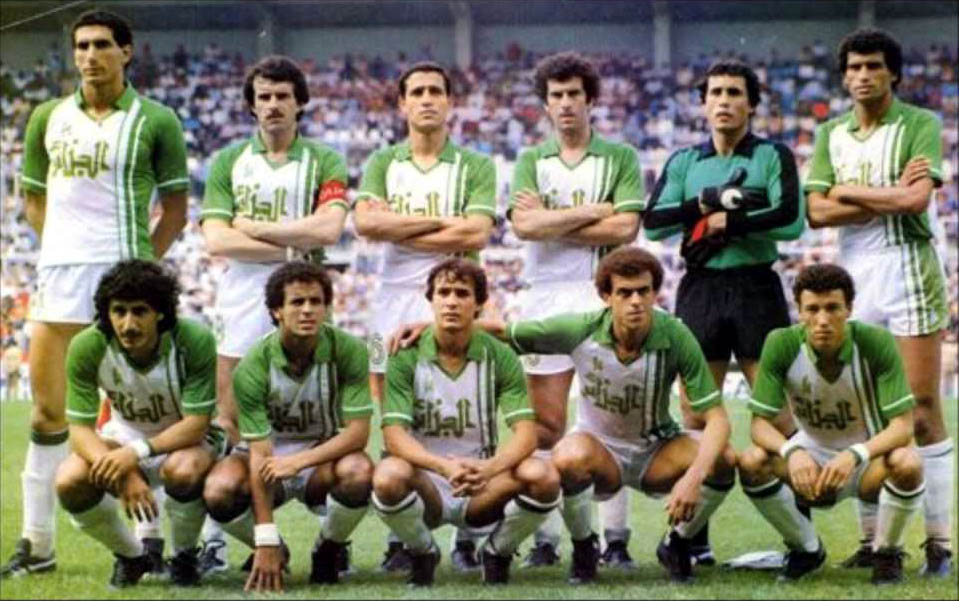
Algeria national team at the 1982 World Cup in Spain

Algeria has qualified to the FIFA World Cup on five occasions, in 1982, 1986, 2010, 2014 and 2026. They have twice qualified for the knockout stage, reaching the round of 16 in 2014 before losing to Germany, and the round of 32 in 2026 before losing to Switzerland. Algeria nearly qualified to the second round of the 1982 World Cup after beating both West Germany and Chile; however, a controversial match between West Germany and Austria wound up eliminating the Algerians.

== Overall record ==
Overall record
FIFA World Cup record										Qualification record								
Year	Result	Position	Pld	W	D	L	GF	GA	Squad	Result	Pld	W	D	L	GF	GA	Top scorer(s) (goals)	Manager(s)
(Uruguay) 1930	Part of France								–	Part of France								
(Italy) 1934	Part of France								–	Part of France								
(France) 1938	Part of France								–	Part of France								
(Brazil) 1950	Part of France								–	Part of France								
(Switzerland) 1954	Part of France								–	Part of France								
(Sweden) 1958	Part of France								–	Part of France								
(Chile) 1962	Part of France								–	Part of France								
(England) 1966	Withdrew								–	Withdrew							Withdrew	
(Mexico) 1970	Did not qualify								–	Round 1	2	0	1	1	1	2	Amirouche (1)	(France) Leduc
(West Germany) 1974	Did not qualify								–	Round 1	2	1	0	1	2	5	Gamouh, Kalem (1)	(Algeria) Mekhloufi
(Argentina) 1978	Did not qualify								–	Round 2	4	1	2	1	2	3	Betrouni, Guendouz (1)	(Algeria) Mekhloufi
(Spain) 1982	Group stage	13th	3	2	0	1	5	5	Squad	Round 4 (final)	8	5	2	1	16	6	Belloumi (5)	(Socialist Federal Republic of Yugoslavia) Rajkov, (Soviet Union) Rogov, (Algeria) Khalef
(Mexico) 1986	Group stage	22nd	3	0	1	2	1	5	Squad	Round 4 (final)	6	5	1	0	13	3	Menad (4)	(Algeria) Saâdane
(Italy) 1990	Did not qualify								–	Round 3 (final)	6	3	2	1	6	2	Madjer (3)	(Algeria) Lemoui, (Algeria) Kermali
(United States) 1994	Did not qualify								–	Round 2 (final)	8	2	3	3	8	11	Tasfaout (4)	(Algeria) Ighil
(France) 1998	Did not qualify								–	Round 1	2	1	0	1	2	3	Tasfaout, Zerrouki (1)	(Algeria) Fergani
(South Korea) (Japan) 2002	Did not qualify								–	Round 2 (final)	10	3	3	4	13	14	Meçabih, Tasfaout, Saïfi (2)	(Algeria) Sandjak, (Algeria) Djaadaoui, (Algeria) Zouba, (Algeria) Kermali
(Germany) 2006	Did not qualify								–	Round 2 (final)	12	3	5	4	15	15	Boutabout (6)	(Belgium) Waseige, (Algeria) Fergani & (Algeria) Belloumi, (Algeria) Ighil
(South Africa) 2010	Group stage	28th	3	0	1	2	0	2	Squad	Round 3 (final)	13	8	2	3	17	8	Saifi, Yahia, Ziani (3)	(Algeria) Saâdane
(Brazil) 2014	Round of 16	14th	4	1	1	2	7	7	Squad	Round 3 (final)	8	6	0	2	16	7	Slimani (5)	(Bosnia and Herzegovina) Halilhodžić
(Russia) 2018	Did not qualify								–	Round 3 (final)	8	2	2	4	15	12	Slimani (4)	(France) Gourcuff, (Serbia) Rajevac, (Belgium) Leekens, (Spain) Alcaraz, (Algeria) Madjer
(Qatar) 2022	Did not qualify								–	Round 3 (final)	8	5	2	1	27	6	Slimani (8)	(Algeria) Belmadi
(Canada) (Mexico) (United States) 2026	Round of 32	30th	4	1	1	2	5	9	Squad	Round 1 (final)	10	8	1	1	24	8	Amoura (10)	(Algeria) Belmadi, (Bosnia and Herzegovina) Petković
(Morocco) (Spain) (Portugal) 2030	To be determined									To be determined								
(Saudi Arabia) 2034	To be determined									To be determined								
Total: 5/23	Round of 16	14th	17	4	4	9	18	28	–	15/22	107	53	26	28	177	105	–	–

== By match ==
By match
World Cup	Round	Opponent	Score	Result	Algeria scorers	Man of the match (Algeria)	Venue
1982	Group 2	West Germany	2–1	W	Madjer, Belloumi	Merzekane	Gijón
1982	Group 2	Austria	0–2	L			Oviedo
1982	Group 2	Chile	3–2	W	Assad (2), Bensaoula	Assad	Oviedo
1986	Group D	Northern Ireland	1–1	D	Zidane		Guadalajara
1986	Group D	Brazil	0–1	L		Drid	Guadalajara
1986	Group D	Spain	0–3	L			Monterrey
2010	Group C	Slovenia	0–1	L			Polokwane
2010	Group C	England	0–0	D			Cape Town
2010	Group C	United States	0–1	L			Pretoria
2014	Group H	Belgium	1–2	L	Feghouli		Belo Horizonte
2014	Group H	South Korea	4–2	W	Slimani, Halliche, Djabou, Brahimi	Slimani	Porto Alegre
2014	Group H	Russia	1–1	D	Slimani	Slimani	Curitiba
2014	Round of 16	Germany	1–2 (a.e.t.)	L	Djabou	M'Bolhi	Porto Alegre
2026	Group J	Argentina	0–3	L			Kansas City
2026	Group J	Jordan	2–1	W	Benbouali, Gouiri	Maza	Santa Clara
2026	Group J	Austria	3–3	D	Belghali, Mahrez (2)	Mahrez	Kansas City
2026	Round of 32	Switzerland	0–2	L			Vancouver

== Head-to-head record ==
Legend
Won more than lost
Won equals lost
Lost more than won

Opponent	Pld	W	D	L	GF	GA	GD	Win %
Argentina	1	0	0	1	0	3	−3	0.00
Austria	2	0	1	1	3	5	−2	0.00
Belgium	1	0	0	1	1	2	−1	0.00
Brazil	1	0	0	1	0	1	−1	0.00
Chile	1	1	0	0	3	2	+1	100.00
England	1	0	1	0	0	0	+0	0.00
Germany	2	1	0	1	3	3	+0	50.00
Jordan	1	1	0	0	2	1	+1	100.00
Northern Ireland	1	0	1	0	1	1	+0	0.00
Russia	1	0	1	0	1	1	+0	0.00
Slovenia	1	0	0	1	0	1	−1	0.00
South Korea	1	1	0	0	4	2	+2	100.00
Spain	1	0	0	1	0	3	−3	0.00
Switzerland	1	0	0	1	0	2	−2	0.00
United States	1	0	0	1	0	1	−1	0.00
Total	17	4	4	9	18	28	−10	23.53

== Participations ==
=== Algeria at Spain 1982 ===
1982 FIFA World Cup

Group 2

Team	Pld	W	D	L	GF	GA	GD	Pts
West Germany	3	2	0	1	6	3	+3	4
Austria	3	2	0	1	3	1	+2	4
Algeria	3	2	0	1	5	5	0	4
Chile	3	0	0	3	3	8	−5	0

16 June 1982
17:15 CEST

West Germany	1–2	Algeria
Rummenigge 67'	Report	Madjer 54'; Belloumi 68'

El Molinón, Gijón
Attendance: 42,000
Referee: Enrique Labo Revoredo (Peru)

21 June 1982
17:15 CEST

Algeria	0–2	Austria
	Report	Schachner 55'; Krankl 67'

Estadio Carlos Tartiere, Oviedo
Attendance: 22,000
Referee: Tony Boskovic (Australia)

24 June 1982
17:15 CEST

Algeria	3–2	Chile
Assad 7', 31'; Bensaoula 35'	Report	Neira 59' (pen.); Letelier 73'

Estadio Carlos Tartiere, Oviedo
Attendance: 16,000
Referee: Rómulo Méndez (Guatemala)

=== Algeria at Mexico 1986 ===
1986 FIFA World Cup

Group D

Team	Pld	W	D	L	GF	GA	GD	Pts
Brazil	3	3	0	0	5	0	+5	6
Spain	3	2	0	1	5	2	+3	4
Northern Ireland	3	0	1	2	2	6	−4	1
Algeria	3	0	1	2	1	5	−4	1

3 June 1986
12:00 CST

Algeria	1–1	Northern Ireland
Zidane 59'	(Report)	Whiteside 6'

Estadio Tres de Marzo, Guadalajara
Attendance: 22,000
Referee: Valeri Butenko (Soviet Union)

6 June 1986
12:00 CST

Brazil	1–0	Algeria
Careca 66'	(Report)

Estadio Jalisco, Guadalajara
Attendance: 48,000
Referee: Rómulo Méndez (Guatemala)

12 June 1986
12:00 CST

Spain	3–0	Algeria
Calderé 15', 68'; Eloy 70'	(Report)

Estadio Tecnológico, Monterrey
Attendance: 20,000
Referee: Shizuo Takada (Japan)

=== Algeria at South Africa 2010 ===
2010 FIFA World Cup

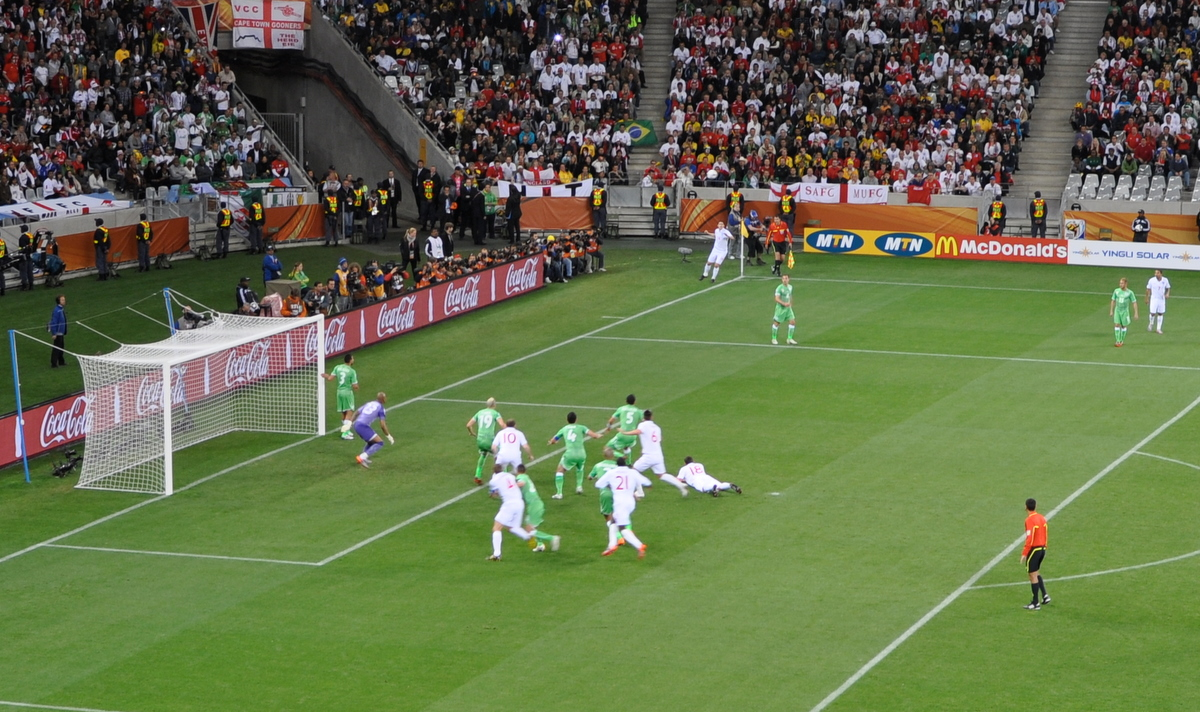
Algeria playing with England.

Group C

Pos	Team	Pld	W	D	L	GF	GA	GD	Pts	Qualification
1	United States	3	1	2	0	4	3	+1	5	Advance to knockout stage
2	England	3	1	2	0	2	1	+1	5	Advance to knockout stage
3	Slovenia	3	1	1	1	3	3	0	4	
4	Algeria	3	0	1	2	0	2	−2	1	

Source: FIFA
Rules for classification: Tie-breaking criteria

==== Algeria vs Slovenia ====
13 June 2010
13:30

Algeria	0–1	Slovenia
	Report	Koren 79'

Peter Mokaba Stadium, Polokwane
Attendance: 30,325
Referee: Carlos Batres (Guatemala)

Algeria	Slovenia

GK	16	Faouzi Chaouchi
RB	4	Antar Yahia (c)
CB	2	Madjid Bougherra
CB	5	Rafik Halliche
LB	3	Nadir Belhadj
RM	8	Mehdi Lacen
CM	15	Karim Ziani
LM	19	Hassan Yebda	(yellow card) 90+5'
RW	21	Foued Kadir		(substituted off) 82'
SS	13	Karim Matmour		(substituted off) 81'
CF	11	Rafik Djebbour		(substituted off) 58'
Substitutions:
FW	9	Abdelkader Ghezzal	(yellow card) 59' (yellow-red card) 73'	(substituted on) 58'
FW	10	Rafik Saïfi		(substituted on) 81'
MF	17	Adlène Guedioura		(substituted on) 82'
Manager:
Rabah Saâdane

GK	1	Samir Handanović
RB	2	Mišo Brečko
CB	4	Marko Šuler
CB	5	Boštjan Cesar
LB	13	Bojan Jokić
RM	17	Andraž Kirm
CM	8	Robert Koren (c)
CM	18	Aleksandar Radosavljević	(yellow card) 35'	(substituted off) 87'
LM	10	Valter Birsa		(substituted off) 84'
SS	14	Zlatko Dedič		(substituted off) 53'
CF	11	Milivoje Novakovič
Substitutions:
FW	9	Zlatan Ljubijankič		(substituted on) 53'
FW	7	Nejc Pečnik		(substituted on) 84'
MF	20	Andrej Komac	(yellow card) 90+3'	(substituted on) 87'
Manager:
Matjaž Kek

Man of the Match:
Robert Koren (Slovenia)

Assistant referees:
Leonel Leal (Costa Rica)
Carlos Pastrana (Honduras)
Fourth official:
Peter O'Leary (New Zealand)
Fifth official:
Brent Best (New Zealand)

==== England vs Algeria ====
18 June 2010
20:30

England	0–0	Algeria
	Report

Cape Town Stadium, Cape Town
Attendance: 64,100
Referee: Ravshan Irmatov (Uzbekistan)

England	Algeria

GK	1	David James
RB	2	Glen Johnson
CB	18	Jamie Carragher	(yellow card) 58'
CB	6	John Terry
LB	3	Ashley Cole
RM	7	Aaron Lennon		(substituted off) 63'
CM	14	Gareth Barry		(substituted off) 84'
CM	8	Frank Lampard
LM	4	Steven Gerrard (c)
SS	10	Wayne Rooney
CF	21	Emile Heskey		(substituted off) 74'
Substitutions:
MF	17	Shaun Wright-Phillips		(substituted on) 63'
FW	19	Jermain Defoe		(substituted on) 74'
FW	9	Peter Crouch		(substituted on) 84'
Manager:
(Italy) Fabio Capello

GK	23	Raïs M'Bolhi
CB	2	Madjid Bougherra
CB	5	Rafik Halliche
CB	4	Antar Yahia (c)
RM	21	Foued Kadir
CM	19	Hassan Yebda		(substituted off) 88'
CM	8	Mehdi Lacen	(yellow card) 85'
LM	3	Nadir Belhadj
AM	7	Ryad Boudebouz		(substituted off) 74'
AM	15	Karim Ziani		(substituted off) 81'
CF	13	Karim Matmour
Substitutions:
MF	22	Djamel Abdoun		(substituted on) 74'
MF	17	Adlène Guedioura		(substituted on) 81'
DF	20	Djamel Mesbah		(substituted on) 88'
Manager:
Rabah Saâdane

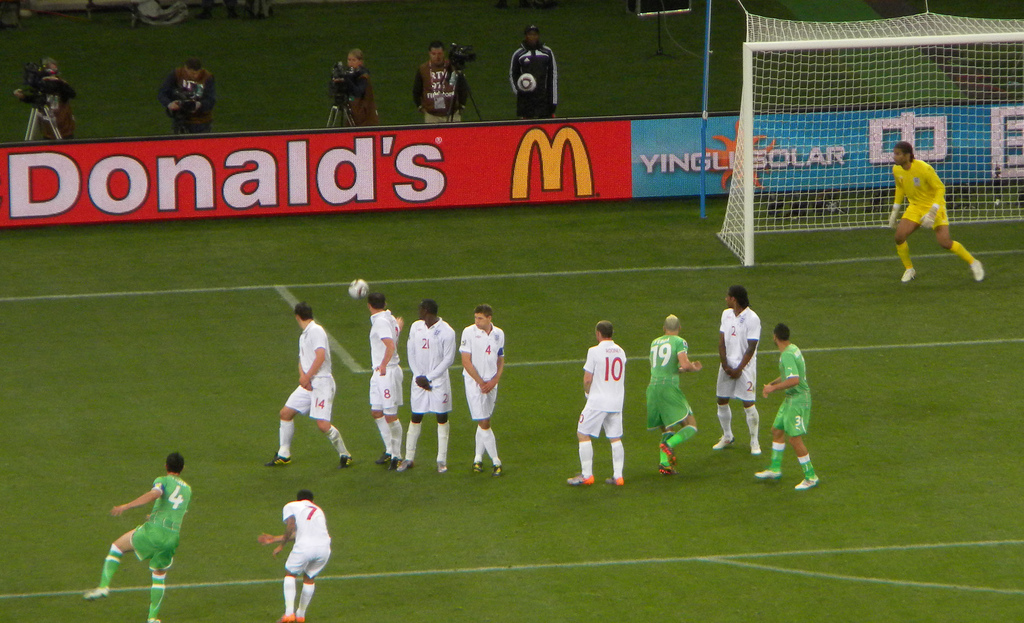
England vs Algeria

Man of the Match:
Ashley Cole (England)

Assistant referees:
Rafael Ilyasov (Uzbekistan)
Bakhadyr Kochkarov (Kyrgyzstan)
Fourth official:
Michael Hester (New Zealand)
Fifth official:
Jan Hendrik Hintz (New Zealand)

==== United States vs Algeria ====
23 June 2010
16:00

United States	1–0	Algeria
Donovan 90+1'	Report

Loftus Versfeld Stadium, Pretoria
Attendance: 35,827
Referee: Frank De Bleeckere (Belgium)

United States	Algeria

GK	1	Tim Howard
RB	12	Jonathan Bornstein		(substituted off) 80'
CB	15	Jay DeMerit
CB	3	Carlos Bocanegra (c)
LB	6	Steve Cherundolo
CM	4	Michael Bradley
CM	19	Maurice Edu		(substituted off) 64'
RW	8	Clint Dempsey
LW	10	Landon Donovan
SS	17	Jozy Altidore	(yellow card) 62'
CF	9	Herculez Gomez		(substituted off) 46'
Substitutions:
MF	22	Benny Feilhaber		(substituted on) 46'
FW	14	Edson Buddle		(substituted on) 64'
MF	7	DaMarcus Beasley	(yellow card) 90'	(substituted on) 80'
Manager:
Bob Bradley

GK	23	Raïs M'Bolhi
RB	2	Madjid Bougherra
CB	5	Rafik Halliche
LB	4	Antar Yahia (c)	(yellow card) 76' (yellow-red card) 90+3'
RM	21	Foued Kadir
CM	19	Hassan Yebda	(yellow card) 12'
CM	8	Mehdi Lacen	(yellow card) 83'
LM	3	Nadir Belhadj
AM	13	Karim Matmour		(substituted off) 84'
AM	15	Karim Ziani		(substituted off) 69'
CF	11	Rafik Djebbour		(substituted off) 65'
Substitutions:
FW	9	Abdelkader Ghezzal		(substituted on) 65'
MF	17	Adlène Guedioura		(substituted on) 69'
FW	10	Rafik Saïfi		(substituted on) 84'
Manager:
Rabah Saâdane

Man of the Match:
Landon Donovan (United States)

Assistant referees:
Peter Hermans (Belgium)
Walter Vromans (Belgium)
Fourth official:
Subkhiddin Mohd Salleh (Malaysia)
Fifth official:
Mu Yuxin (China)

=== Algeria at Brazil 2014 ===
2014 FIFA World Cup

Group H

Pos	Team	Pld	W	D	L	GF	GA	GD	Pts	Qualification
1	Belgium	3	3	0	0	4	1	+3	9	Advance to knockout stage
2	Algeria	3	1	1	1	6	5	+1	4	Advance to knockout stage
3	Russia	3	0	2	1	2	3	−1	2	
4	South Korea	3	0	1	2	3	6	−3	1	

Source: FIFA
Rules for classification: Tie-breaking criteria

==== Belgium vs Algeria ====
17 June 2014
13:00

Belgium	2–1	Algeria
Fellaini 70'; Mertens 80'	Report	Feghouli 24' (pen.)

Estádio Mineirão, Belo Horizonte
Attendance: 56,800
Referee: Marco Rodríguez (Mexico)

Belgium	Algeria

GK	1	Thibaut Courtois
RB	2	Toby Alderweireld
CB	15	Daniel Van Buyten
CB	4	Vincent Kompany (c)
LB	5	Jan Vertonghen	(yellow card) 24'
CM	6	Axel Witsel
CM	19	Mousa Dembélé		(substituted off) 65'
RW	22	Nacer Chadli		(substituted off) 46'
AM	7	Kevin De Bruyne
LW	10	Eden Hazard
CF	9	Romelu Lukaku		(substituted off) 58'
Substitutions:
FW	14	Dries Mertens		(substituted on) 46'
FW	17	Divock Origi		(substituted on) 58'
MF	8	Marouane Fellaini		(substituted on) 65'
Manager:
Marc Wilmots

GK	23	Raïs M'Bolhi
RB	22	Mehdi Mostefa
CB	2	Madjid Bougherra (c)
CB	5	Rafik Halliche
LB	3	Faouzi Ghoulam
RM	19	Saphir Taïder
CM	12	Carl Medjani		(substituted off) 84'
LM	14	Nabil Bentaleb	(yellow card) 34'
AM	10	Sofiane Feghouli
AM	21	Riyad Mahrez		(substituted off) 71'
CF	15	El Arbi Hillel Soudani		(substituted off) 66'
Substitutions:
FW	13	Islam Slimani		(substituted on) 66'
MF	8	Mehdi Lacen		(substituted on) 71'
FW	9	Nabil Ghilas		(substituted on) 84'
Manager:
(Bosnia and Herzegovina) Vahid Halilhodžić

Man of the Match:
Kevin De Bruyne (Belgium)

Assistant referees:
Marvin Torrentera (Mexico)
Marcos Quintero (Mexico)
Fourth official:
Alireza Faghani (Iran)
Fifth official:
Hassan Kamranifar (Iran)

==== South Korea vs Algeria ====
22 June 2014
16:00

South Korea	2–4	Algeria
Son Heung-min 50'; Koo Ja-cheol 72'	Report	Slimani 26'; Halliche 28'; Djabou 38'; Brahimi 62'

Estádio Beira-Rio, Porto Alegre
Attendance: 42,732
Referee: Wilmar Roldán (Colombia)

South Korea	Algeria

GK	1	Jung Sung-ryong
RB	12	Lee Yong	(yellow card) 54'
CB	20	Hong Jeong-ho
CB	5	Kim Young-gwon
LB	3	Yun Suk-young
CM	14	Han Kook-young	(yellow card) 69'	(substituted off) 78'
CM	16	Ki Sung-yueng
RW	17	Lee Chung-yong		(substituted off) 64'
AM	13	Koo Ja-cheol (c)
LW	9	Son Heung-min
CF	10	Park Chu-young		(substituted off) 57'
Substitutions:
FW	18	Kim Shin-wook		(substituted on) 57'
FW	11	Lee Keun-ho		(substituted on) 64'
FW	19	Ji Dong-won		(substituted on) 78'
Manager:
Hong Myung-bo

GK	23	Raïs M'Bolhi
CB	12	Carl Medjani
CB	2	Madjid Bougherra (c)	(yellow card) 67'	(substituted off) 89'
CB	5	Rafik Halliche
RWB	20	Aïssa Mandi
LWB	6	Djamel Mesbah
CM	11	Yacine Brahimi		(substituted off) 77'
CM	18	Abdelmoumene Djabou		(substituted off) 73'
RW	10	Sofiane Feghouli
LW	14	Nabil Bentaleb
CF	13	Islam Slimani
Substitutions:
FW	9	Nabil Ghilas		(substituted on) 73'
MF	8	Mehdi Lacen		(substituted on) 77'
DF	4	Essaïd Belkalem		(substituted on) 89'
Manager:
(Bosnia and Herzegovina) Vahid Halilhodžić

Man of the Match:
Islam Slimani (Algeria)

Assistant referees:
Eduardo Díaz (Colombia)
Christian Lescano (Ecuador)
Fourth official:
Alireza Faghani (Iran)
Fifth official:
Hassan Kamranifar (Iran)

==== Algeria vs Russia ====
26 June 2014
17:00 UTC−3

Algeria	1–1	Russia
Slimani 60'	Report	Kokorin 6'

Arena da Baixada, Curitiba
Attendance: 39,311
Referee: Cüneyt Çakır (Turkey)

Algeria	Russia

GK	23	Raïs M'Bolhi
RB	20	Aïssa Mandi
CB	4	Essaïd Belkalem
CB	5	Rafik Halliche (c)
LB	6	Djamel Mesbah	(yellow card) 39'
CM	12	Carl Medjani
CM	14	Nabil Bentaleb
RW	10	Sofiane Feghouli
AM	11	Yacine Brahimi		(substituted off) 71'
LW	18	Abdelmoumene Djabou		(substituted off) 77'
CF	13	Islam Slimani		(substituted off) 90+2'
Substitutions:
MF	7	Hassan Yebda		(substituted on) 71'
FW	9	Nabil Ghilas	(yellow card) 87'	(substituted on) 77'
FW	15	El Arbi Hillel Soudani		(substituted on) 90+2'
DF	17	Liassine Cadamuro	(yellow card) 90+2' (Note: Despite not playing, Cadamuro received a yellow card on the bench.)
Manager:
(Bosnia and Herzegovina) Vahid Halilhodžić

GK	1	Igor Akinfeev
RB	2	Aleksei Kozlov	(yellow card) 59'
CB	14	Vasili Berezutski (c)
CB	4	Sergei Ignashevich
LB	23	Dmitri Kombarov	(yellow card) 57'
CM	8	Denis Glushakov		(substituted off) 46'
CM	20	Viktor Fayzulin
RW	19	Aleksandr Samedov
AM	9	Aleksandr Kokorin
LW	17	Oleg Shatov		(substituted off) 67'
CF	11	Aleksandr Kerzhakov		(substituted off) 81'
Substitutions:
MF	7	Igor Denisov		(substituted on) 46'
MF	10	Alan Dzagoev		(substituted on) 67'
FW	6	Maksim Kanunnikov		(substituted on) 81'
Manager:
(Italy) Fabio Capello

Man of the Match:
Islam Slimani (Algeria)

Assistant referees:
Bahattin Duran (Turkey)
Tarık Ongun (Turkey)
Fourth official:
Joel Aguilar (El Salvador)
Fifth official:
Juan Zumba (El Salvador)

==== Germany vs Algeria ====
30 June 2014
17:00

Germany	2–1 (a.e.t.)	Algeria
Schürrle 92'; Özil 120'	Report	Djabou 120+1'

Estádio Beira-Rio, Porto Alegre
Attendance: 43,063
Referee: Sandro Ricci (Brazil)

Germany	Algeria

GK	1	Manuel Neuer
RB	21	Shkodran Mustafi		(substituted off) 70'
CB	17	Per Mertesacker
CB	20	Jérôme Boateng
LB	4	Benedikt Höwedes
DM	16	Philipp Lahm (c)	(yellow card) 107'
CM	7	Bastian Schweinsteiger		(substituted off) 109'
CM	18	Toni Kroos
RW	8	Mesut Özil
LW	19	Mario Götze		(substituted off) 46'
CF	13	Thomas Müller
Substitutes:
MF	9	André Schürrle		(substituted on) 46'
MF	6	Sami Khedira		(substituted on) 70'
MF	23	Christoph Kramer		(substituted on) 109'
Manager:
Joachim Löw

GK	23	Raïs M'Bolhi
CB	22	Mehdi Mostefa
CB	4	Essaïd Belkalem
CB	5	Rafik Halliche (c)	(yellow card) 42'	(substituted off) 97'
RWB	20	Aïssa Mandi
LWB	3	Faouzi Ghoulam
DM	8	Mehdi Lacen
RM	19	Saphir Taïder		(substituted off) 78'
CM	10	Sofiane Feghouli
LM	13	Islam Slimani
CF	15	El Arbi Hillel Soudani		(substituted off) 100'
Substitutes:
MF	11	Yacine Brahimi		(substituted on) 78'
DF	2	Madjid Bougherra		(substituted on) 97'
MF	18	Abdelmoumene Djabou		(substituted on) 100'
Manager:
(Bosnia and Herzegovina) Vahid Halilhodžić

Man of the Match:
Raïs M'Bolhi (Algeria)

Assistant referees:
Emerson de Carvalho (Brazil)
Marcelo Van Gasse (Brazil)
Fourth official:
Walter López (Guatemala)
Fifth official:
Leonel Leal (Costa Rica)

=== Algeria at United States/Canada/Mexico 2026 ===
2026 FIFA World Cup

==== Group stage ====
Pos	Team	Pld	W	D	L	GF	GA	GD	Pts	Qualification
1	Argentina	3	3	0	0	8	1	+7	9	Advance to knockout stage
2	Austria	3	1	1	1	6	6	0	4 (Note: Tied on head-to-head result (Algeria 3–3 Austria). Overall goal difference was used as the tiebreaker.)	Advance to knockout stage
3	Algeria	3	1	1	1	5	7	−2	4	Advance to knockout stage
4	Jordan	3	0	0	3	3	8	−5	0	

Source: FIFA
Notes:
June 16, 2026
8:00 p.m. UTC−5

Argentina	3–0	Algeria
Messi 17', 60', 76'	(Note: "Argentina vs Algeria | First Stage | FIFA World Cup 2026". FIFA. Retrieved June 16, 2026.; "Match Report – Group J – Argentina v. Algeria". FIFA. Retrieved June 17, 2026.; "Post match summary report – Group J – Argentina v. Algeria". FIFA. June 16, 2026. Retrieved June 17, 2026.)

Arrowhead Stadium, Kansas City
Attendance: 69,045
Referee: Szymon Marciniak (Poland)

June 22, 2026
8:00 p.m. UTC−7

Jordan	1–2	Algeria
Al-Rashdan 36'	(Note: "Jordan vs Algeria | First Stage | FIFA World Cup 2026". FIFA. Retrieved June 22, 2026.; "Match Report – Group J – Jordan v. Algeria". FIFA. June 23, 2026. Retrieved June 23, 2026.; "Post match summary report – Group J – Jordan v. Algeria". FIFA. June 23, 2026. Retrieved June 23, 2026.)	Benbouali 69'; Gouiri 82'

Levi's Stadium, Santa Clara
Attendance: 68,371
Referee: Slavko Vinčić (Slovenia)

June 27, 2026
9:00 p.m. UTC−5

Algeria	3–3	Austria
Belghali 45'; Mahrez 60', 90+3'	(Note: "Algeria vs Austria | First Stage | FIFA World Cup 2026". FIFA. Retrieved June 28, 2026.; "Match Report – Group J – Algeria v. Austria". FIFA. June 28, 2026. Retrieved June 28, 2026.; "Post match summary report – Group J – Algeria v. Austria". FIFA. June 28, 2026. Retrieved June 28, 2026.)	Arnautović 28'; Sabitzer 55'; Kalajdžić 90+6'

Arrowhead Stadium, Kansas City
Attendance: 69,045
Referee: Ilgiz Tantashev (Uzbekistan)

==== Knockout stage ====
Round of 32

July 2, 2026
8:00 p.m. UTC−7

Switzerland	2–0	Algeria
Embolo 10'; Ndoye 46'	(Note: "Switzerland vs Algeria | Round of 32 | FIFA World Cup 2026". FIFA. Retrieved July 3, 2026.; "Match Report – Round of 32 – Switzerland v. Algeria". FIFA. July 3, 2026. Retrieved July 3, 2026.; "Post match summary report – Round of 32 – Switzerland v. Algeria". FIFA. July 3, 2026. Retrieved July 3, 2026.)

BC Place, Vancouver
Attendance: 52,497
Referee: Yael Falcón (Argentina)

== Player records ==
As of 2 July 2026

=== Most appearances ===
Rank	Player	Matches	World Cups
1	Rafik Halliche	7	2010 and 2014
1	Nabil Bentaleb	7	2014 and 2026
1	Aïssa Mandi	7	2014 and 2026
4	Mahmoud Guendouz	6	1982 and 1986
4	Rabah Madjer	6	1982 and 1986
4	Faouzi Mansouri	6	1982 and 1986
4	Madjid Bougherra	6	2010 and 2014
4	Mehdi Lacen	6	2010 and 2014
4	Raïs M'Bolhi	6	2010 and 2014
10	Salah Assad	5	1982 and 1986
10	Lakhdar Belloumi	5	1982 and 1986
10	Noureddine Kourichi	5	1982 and 1986
10	Djamel Zidane	5	1982 and 1986
10	Riyad Mahrez	5	2014 and 2026

=== Goalscorers ===
On 16 June 1982, Rabah Madjer made history by scoring Algeria's first-ever FIFA World Cup goal, coming in their opening match against Germany in Gijón.

Salah Assad and Riyad Mahrez scored twice in a single match against Chile in 1982 and Austria in 2026, respectively.

Rank	Player	Goals	1982	1986	2010	2014	2026
1	Salah Assad	2	2				
1	Abdelmoumene Djabou	2				2	
1	Islam Slimani	2				2	
1	Riyad Mahrez	2					2
5	Lakhdar Belloumi	1	1				
5	Tedj Bensaoula	1	1				
5	Rabah Madjer	1	1				
5	Djamel Zidane	1		1			
5	Yacine Brahimi	1				1	
5	Sofiane Feghouli	1				1	
5	Rafik Halliche	1				1	
5	Rafik Belghali	1					1
5	Nadhir Benbouali	1					1
5	Amine Gouiri	1					1
Total		18	5	1	0	7	5

== Historical performances ==
The Algeria team had many records and facts which had done during its participations in the world cup.

- 1982: First African team to beat a European team (West Germany)
- 1982: First African team to win two games
- 1982: First team to win two games in the first round and not advance
- 1982: FIFA revised the group system for future tournaments, so that the final two games in each group would be played simultaneously because the controversial game between West Germany & Austria that causes the elimination of Algeria
- 1986: First African team to qualify consecutively for the second time
- 2014: First African team to score four goals in one game against South Korea
- 2014: First African team to reach the knockout stage simultaneously with another African team (Nigeria)

== See also ==
- African nations at the FIFA World Cup
- Algeria at the Africa Cup of Nations
