= Webster Chikabala =

Zambian footballer (1965–1997)

Personal information
- Date of birth: 27 March 1965
- Place of birth: Chambishi, Zambia
- Date of death: 27 December 1997 (aged 32)
- Place of death: Kwekwe, Zimbabwe
- Position: Striker

Youth career
- 1982–1984: Chambishi Blackburn

Senior career*
Years	Team	Apps	(Gls)
1984–1986	Mufulira Blackpool		
1986–1987	Vitafoam United		
1987–1990	Nchanga Rangers		
1990–1991	Maritimo	18	(2)
1991–1993	Eendracht Aalst		
1993	Chambishi FC		
1993–1995	Mhangura F.C.		

International career
1987–1992	Zambia	32	(9)

Managerial career
- 1993: Chambishi FC
- 1995–1997: Mhangura FC
- 1997: Lancashire Steel
- * Club domestic league appearances and goals

Webster "Webby" Chikabala (27 March 1965 – 27 December 1997) was a Zambian football player and coach. He represented Zambia at the African Cup of Nations in 1990 and 1992. Chikabala played as a forward. He played professional football in Portugal when he joined Maritimo in August 1990.

== Club career ==
Chikabala was born in Chambishi and spent his youth years with the local team Chambishi Blackburn (now called Chambishi FC), in FAZ Division I, before moving to Mufulira Blackpool in 1984, where he spent two seasons and thereafter joined Ndola side Vitafoam United in 1986. Later, he signed for the Nchanga Rangers in 1987. He was nicknamed Mukishi Joe. When Nyirenda left in mid-1987 to join Belgian club Harelbeke, Chikabala took over as the team's centre-forward.

Chikabala failed to win a trophy with Rangers, with their best-placed league finish being third in 1990, the year in which he left before the end of the season to join Maritimo in August 1990. A year later, Chikabala signed a two-year deal with Eendracht Aalst in Belgium and disclosed that he was owed US$13,000 in wages by Maritmo after the Portuguese side went bankrupt. In December 1992, he was suspended indefinitely by FIFA when it transpired that he had signed the Aalst deal while still under contract with Maritimo.

The ban was lifted in March 1993 when Maritmo withdrew their claim and he was allowed to resume his career with Aalst.

== International career ==
Chikabala first played for Zambia Schools for the 1987 CECAFA tournament. After Zambia lost 4–0 to Uganda in their opening game, he was named in the starting line-up in the next game against Uganda, and he scored a debut goal in a 2–2 draw.

He was featured at the 1988 Summer Olympics. When Zambia qualified to CAN 1990, he scored the only goal of the match. His team lost to Nigeria in the semi-finals, but they won third place when Zambia defeated Senegal 1–0. Two years later, Chikabala takes part in the 1992 African Nations Cup.

After he discovered that his wages were being pegged at the locals' rate, he was persuaded to stay by the coaching staff.

Zamalek star Mahmoud Abdul-Razek, better known as Shikabala, was nicknamed after him by Egyptian fans.

== Coaching career ==
Chikabala started coaching at his boyhood club, Chambishi FC, as player-coach in 1993, though he did not stay long. He later moved to Zimbabwe, where he joined Mangura FC as a player and later took over as coach. He led them to the BP Cup final in 1995, where they lost 4–0 to Dynamos. He left Mhangura in early 1997 and joined Lancashire Steel FC in Kwekwe and held the position of coach until his death later that year.

== Death ==
In late 1997, Chikabala became ill and, on 12 December, was admitted to Redcliff Medical Centre suffering from meningitis. He was moved to Kwekwe General Hospital when his condition deteriorated; he died on 27 December 1997. His body was transported to his home town of Chambishi, where he was put to rest three days later.
