= List of Algeria international footballers born outside Algeria =

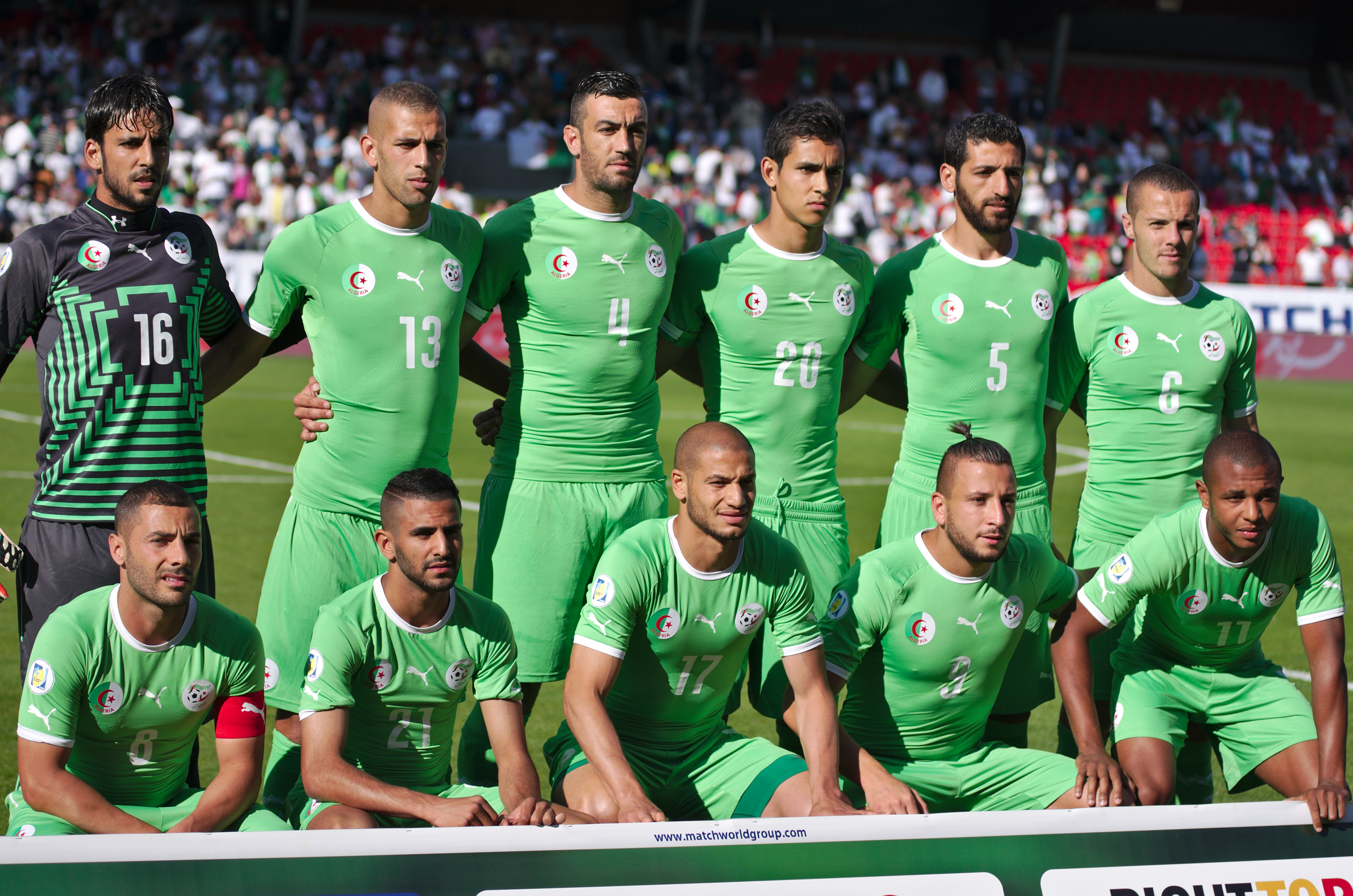
Algeria national football team in 2014, most of them were born in France before participating in the 2014 FIFA World Cup. From Left to Right: Standing : Zemmamouche – Slimani – Belkalem – Mandi – Halliche – Mesbah Crouching Lacen (C) – Mahrez – Guedioura – Ghilas – Brahimi.

This is a list of foreign players who have played international football for the Algerian national football team. Algeria boasts a diaspora of over two million people in Europe, allowing it to count on dual nationals to strengthen its team. However, in most cases, dual nationals face a choice play for their home country (very often in Europe) or their country of origin, Algeria. The turning point and the amplification of this issue of dual national players, however, came at the beginning of the 2000s, some like Farès Chaïbi or Riyad Mahrez chose their country of origin while others like Karim Benzema and Samir Nasri chose their country of birth, France.

In the 21st century, many selected players come from Algerian immigration in France. Thus of the 23 players who won the 2019 Africa Cup of Nations, 14 (or 60%), including Djamel Belmadi, are Franco-Algerians born in France and all have French nationality. Furthermore, they were all born and raised in metropolitan France but chose Algeria as their sporting nationality. In March 2023, during the qualifying matches for the CAN 2024, five of the six players joined the national team. These are Jaouen Hadjam, Farès Chaïbi, Rayan Aït-Nouri, Badredine Bouanani and Kevin Van Den Kerkhof. The coach declared during a press conference held at the National Technical Center of Sidi Moussa (CTN) in Algiers, concerning the call-up, for the first time, of several players, most of whom play abroad.

The following players:

1. have played at least one game for the full Algeria international team.
2. have not been born inside Algeria and qualify through the FIFA grand parent rules,

16 of the Algeria players selected for the 2014 FIFA World Cup squad had been born in France. This followed rule changes by FIFA which allowed players to switch nationality, so long as they had not played in a competitive senior international match. Eight players in the 2014 Algeria squad had played for France youth teams.

== Key ==
*	Current internationals. Statistics are correct as of 10 September 2024.
Caps	Appearances
Pos	Positions
GK	Goalkeeper
DF	Defender
MF	Midfielder
FW	Forward

== List of players ==
As of 14 November 2024

Place of birth	Player	Pos	Caps	Goals	First cap	Last cap	Notes
France (Ostricourt)	Noureddine Kourichi	DF	30	2	1980	1986	
France (Lyon)	Fathi Chebal	MF	1	0	1981	1981	
France (Nancy)	Rachid Maâtar	MF	9	1	1985	1988	
France (Lyon)	Halim Benmabrouk	MF	3	0	1986	1986	
France (Lens)	Chérif Oudjani	FW	21	2	1986	1992	
England (Chelsea)	Rachid Harkouk	FW	4	0	1986	1986	Born to an English mother
France (Mulhouse)	Ali Bouafia	MF	7	0	1987	1992	
France (Montreuil-sous-Bois)	Liazid Sandjak	MF	1	0	1992	1992	
France (Arles)	Youssef Salimi	DF	1	0	1997	1997	
France (Marseille)	Salem Harchèche	DF	13	0	1997	2001	
France (Givors)	Karim Kerkar	MF	4	0	1998	2004	
France (Thionville)	Nasreddine Kraouche	MF	37	3	1999	2005	
France (Tours)	Maamar Mamouni	MF	29	2	1999	2005	
France (Champigny-sur-Marne)	Djamel Belmadi	MF	20	5	2000	2004	
France (Metz)	Mehdi Méniri	DF	22	2	2000	2008	
France (Saint-Denis)	Hakim Saci	FW	2	0	2000	2002	
France (Revin)	Yazid Mansouri	MF	67	0	2001	2010	
France (Besançon)	Rachid Djebaili	FW	2	0	2001	2001	
France (Troyes)	Mohamed Bradja	DF	5	0	2001	2002	
France (Rognac)	Sabri Tabet	FW	2	0	2002	2002	
France (Mulhouse)	Malek Aït Alia	DF	2	0	2003	2004	
France (Marseille)	Salim Arrache	MF	13	1	2003	2008	
France (Sèvres)	Karim Ziani	MF	62	5	2003	2011	Born to a French mother
France (Bondy)	Fadel Brahami	MF	16	0	2003	2006	
France (Le Creusot)	Mansour Boutabout	FW	22	6	2003	2008	
France (La Tronche)	Abdelmalek Cherrad	FW	18	7	2003	2007	
France (Paris)	Mohamed Benhamou	GK	7	0	2004	2004	
France (Forbach)	Abdelnasser Ouadah	DF	1	0	2004	2004	
France (Lille)	Karim Benounes	MF	1	0	2004	2004	
France (Rouen)	Salah Bakour	DF	1	0	2004	2004	
France (Mulhouse)	Antar Yahia	DF	53	6	2004	2012	
France (Saint-Claude)	Nadir Belhadj	DF	55	4	2004	2012	
France (Longvic)	Madjid Bougherra	DF	70	4	2004	2015	
France (Melun)	Samir Beloufa	DF	9	0	2004	2006	
Morocco (Casablanca)	Ahmed Reda Madouni	DF	2	0	2005	2005	
Netherlands (Amsterdam)	Karim Bridji	MF	1	0	2006	2006	
France (Lyon)	Yacine Hima	MF	2	0	2006	2006	
France (Lyon)	Khaled Kharroubi	MF	1	0	2006	2006	
France (Antibes)	Kamel Larbi	MF	1	0	2006	2006	
France (Saint-Avold)	Chadli Amri	FW	10	0	2006	2010	
France (Grenoble)	Rafik Djebbour	FW	33	5	2006	2014	
France (Strasbourg)	Karim Matmour	MF	31	2	2007	2012	
France (Évry)	Hameur Bouazza	MF	21	3	2007	2013	
France (Nancy)	Ismaël Bouzid	DF	12	0	2007	2012	
France (Marseille)	Kamel Ghilas	FW	19	3	2007	2012	
France (Oullins)	Féthi Harek	DF	1	0	2008	2008	
France (Colombes)	Brahim Hemdani	MF	2	0	2008	2009	
France (Décines-Charpieu)	Abdelkader Ghezzal	FW	28	3	2008	2012	
France (Givors)	Khaled Lemmouchia	MF	27	0	2008	2013	
France (Saint-Maurice)	Hassan Yebda	MF	26	2	2009	2014	
France (Paris)	Mourad Meghni	MF	9	0	2009	2010	Born to an Algerian father and a Portuguese mother
France (Lyon)	Carl Medjani	DF	62	4	2010	2018	Born to a French mother
France (Paris)	Medhi Lacen	MF	46	0	2010	2015	Born to an Italian mother
France (Dijon)	Mehdi Mostefa	MF	25	0	2010	2014	Born to a French mother
France (Martigues)	Foued Kadir	MF	25	2	2010	2015	
France (Bobigny)	Habib Bellaïd	DF	1	0	2010	2010	Born to a Tunisian father and an Algerian mother
France (Colmar)	Ryad Boudebouz	MF	25	2	2010	2018	
France (Trappes)	Walid Mesloub	MF	7	0	2010	2016	
France (Amiens)	Zahir Zerdab	MF	1	0	2010	2010	
East Germany (Dresden)	Karim Benyamina	FW	2	0	2010	2010	Born to a German mother
France (Montreuil)	Djamel Abdoun	MF	11	0	2010	2010	
France (Montreuil-sous-Bois)	Mohamed Chalali	FW	1	0	2012	2012	
France (Roanne)	Cédric Si Mohamed	GK	1	0	2012	2012	Born to a French mother
France (Toulouse)	Liassine Cadamuro	DF	15	1	2012	2017	Born to Italian father and an Algerian mother
France (Marseille)	Nabil Ghilas	FW	8	2	2013	2014	
France (Amnéville)	Amir Karaoui	MF	1	0	2013	2013	
France (Castres)	Saphir Taïder	MF	46	5	2013	2018	Born to a Tunisian father and an Algerian mother
France (Saint-Priest-en-Jarez)	Faouzi Ghoulam	DF	37	5	2013	2018	
France (Langres)	Laurent Agouazi	MF	2	0	2013	2013	Born to a French mother
France (Lille)	Nabil Bentaleb	MF	52	5	2014	2024	
France (Aubervilliers)	Ahmed Kashi	MF	1	0	2015	2015	
France (Ivry-sur-Seine)	Sofiane Hanni	MF	12	4	2016	2018	
France (Saint-Aubin-lès-Elbeuf)	Yassine Benzia	FW	12	4	2016	2024*	
France (Valence)	Idriss Saadi	FW	2	0	2017	2017	
France (Cholet)	Ilias Hassani	DF	3	0	2017	2019	
France (Décines-Charpieu)	Rachid Ghezzal	MF	22	2	2015	2022*	
France (Chambray-lès-Tours)	Adam Ounas	MF	24	5	2017	2022*	
France (Meudon)	Mehdi Tahrat	MF	15	0	2015	2020	
France (Sainte-Foy-lès-Lyon)	Mehdi Zeffane	DF	19	1	2014	2021	
France (Paris)	Yacine Brahimi	MF	74	18	2013	2024*	
France (La Roche-sur-Yon)	Adlène Guedioura	MF	63	2	2010	2022	Born to a Spanish mother
France (Paris)	Raïs M'Bolhi	GK	96	0	2010	2022	Born to a Congolese father and an Algerian mother
France (Levallois-Perret)	Sofiane Feghouli	MF	82	20	2012	2024	
France (Châlons-en-Champagne)	Aïssa Mandi	DF	101	5	2014	2024*	
France (Sarcelles)	Riyad Mahrez	MF	98	31	2014	2024*	
France (Montreuil)	Mehdi Abeid	MF	19	1	2015	2021	
France (Arles)	Ismaël Bennacer	MF	50	2	2016	2024*	Born to a Moroccan father and an Algerian mother
France (Nevers)	Alexandre Oukidja	GK	7	0	2019	2024*	Born to a French mother
France (Aubervilliers)	Mohamed Fares	DF	12	0	2017	2021	
France (Sète)	Andy Delort	FW	15	2	2019	2023*	Born to a French father and an Algerian mother
France (La Courneuve)	Haris Belkebla	MF	11	0	2019	2023	
France (Vitrolles)	Farid Boulaya	MF	8	1	2020	2022	
France (Marseille)	Abdel Medioub	DF	1	0	2020	2020	
France (Clermont-Ferrand)	Mehdi Zerkane	DF	1	0	2020	2020	
Netherlands (Amsterdam)	Ramiz Zerrouki	MF	41	3	2021	2024*	
France (Roubaix)	Ahmed Touba	DF	13	1	2021	2024*	
France (Grasse)	Anthony Mandrea	GK	20	0	2022	2024*	Born to a French father and Algerian mother
France (Paris)	Jaouen Hadjam	DF	6	0	2023	2024*	
France (Montreuil)	Rayan Aït-Nouri	DF	16	0	2023	2024*	
Canada (Montreal)	Mohamed Farsi	DF	3	0	2024	2024*	
France (Lyon)	Houssem Aouar	MF	14	5	2023	2024*	
France (Bourgoin-Jallieu)	Amine Gouiri	FW	11	4	2023	2024*	
France (Paris)	Anis Hadj Moussa	FW	3	0	2024	2024*	
France (Maubeuge)	Kevin Van Den Kerkhof	DF	5	0	2023	2024*	
France (Lyon)	Farès Chaïbi	MF	10	2	2023	2023*	
France (Montivilliers)	Himad Abdelli	MF	3	0	2023	2023*	
France (Fécamp)	Victor Lekhal	MF	1	0	2019	2019	
France (Lille)	Badredine Bouanani	FW	5	0	2023	2023*	
Germany (Berlin)	Ibrahim Maza	FW	1	0	2024	2024*	Born to an algerian father and vietnamese mother
Denmark (Copenhagen)	Amin Chiakha	FW	1	0	2024	2024*	Born to an algerian father and a Danish mother

=== By country of birth ===
Country	Total
France	100
Netherlands	2
Morocco	1
England	1
East Germany	1
Canada	1
Germany	1
Denmark	1

== See also ==
- List of Algerian international footballers
