= Herbert Anijekwu =

Nigerian footballer (1964–2013)

Personal information
- Date of birth: 4 December 1964
- Date of death: 20 September 2013 (aged 48)
- Position: Defender

International career
Years	Team	Apps	(Gls)
1990–1991	Nigeria	6	(0)

Herbert Anijekwu (4 December 1964 – 20 September 2013) was a Nigerian footballer who played as a defender. He played in six matches for the Nigeria national football team in 1990 and 1991. He was also named in Nigeria's squad for the 1990 African Cup of Nations tournament.
