= Linos Makwaza =

Zambian footballer (born 1965)

Personal information
- Date of birth: 4 December 1965 (age 60)
- Position: Midfielder

International career
Years	Team	Apps	(Gls)
1988–1995	Zambia	34	(5)

Linos Makwaza (born 4 December 1965) is a Zambian former footballer who played as a midfielder. He made 34 appearances for the Zambia national team from 1988 to 1995. He was also named in Zambia's squad for the 1990 African Cup of Nations tournament.
