= Larbi El Hadi =

Algerian footballer (born 1961)

Personal information
- Date of birth: 27 May 1961 (age 65)
- Place of birth: Belouizdad, Algeria
- Height: 1.79 m (5 ft 10 1/2 in)
- Position: Goalkeeper

Senior career*
Years	Team	Apps	(Gls)
1980–1983	NA Hussein Dey		
- WA Boufarik
- JS Kabylie
- ES Zarzis

International career
1982–1989	Algeria	15	(0)
- * Club domestic league appearances and goals

Larbi El Hadi (born 27 May 1961) is an Algerian former footballer who played as a goalkeeper for the Algeria national team, most notably in the 1986 FIFA World Cup. In that edition of the World Cup, he played in Algeria's opening match versus Northern Ireland and came on in the 20th minute as a substitute in the third match versus Spain, replacing Nacerdine Drid. He also played for NA Hussein Dey, WA Boufarik, JS Kabylie and Tunisian club ES Zarzis.
