= Isaac Semitoje =

Nigerian footballer

Personal information
- Date of birth: 28 April 1968 (age 58)

International career
Years	Team	Apps	(Gls)
1990–1999	Nigeria	21	(0)

Isaac Semitoje (born 28 April 1968) is a Nigerian footballer. He played in 21 matches for the Nigeria national football team from 1990 to 1999. He was also named in Nigeria's squad for the 1990 African Cup of Nations tournament.
