= Mhangura F.C. =

Association football club in Zimbabwe

Mhangura Football Club was an association football club based in Mhangura, Zimbabwe.

== History ==
Mhangura F.C. competed in the Zimbabwean top flight.
