= Moses Kpakor =

Nigerian footballer

Personal information
- Date of birth: 6 January 1965 (age 61)
- Place of birth: Benué State, Nigeria
- Position: Midfielder

Senior career*
Years	Team	Apps	(Gls)
1982	Hawks	-	(-)
1983	Electricity	-	(-)
1984–1986	BCC Lions	-	(-)
1987	Abiola Babes	-	(-)
1988–1998	BCC Lions	-	(-)

International career
1989–1993	Nigeria	-	(-)
- * Club domestic league appearances and goals

Moses Kpakor (born 6 January 1965) is a retired Nigeria Professional football player, who played as a football midfielder for Nigeria at the 1990 African Cup of Nations in Algeria.

== Career ==
Born in Benué State, Kpakor began playing club football as a defensive midfielder for local side Hawks of Makurdi formerly known as BBL Hawks. He would play in the Nigerian Premier League with Electricity FC, BCC Lions FC and Abiola Babes during an 18-year career. He won the Nigerian FA Cup twice (with Abiola Babes in 1987 and with BCC Lions in 1989) and the African Cup Winners' Cup (with BCC Lions in 1990).

Kpakor made several appearances for the Nigeria senior national team, including a 1994 FIFA World Cup qualifier. He played in every match at the 1990 African Cup of Nations, helping Nigeria to a runners'-up finish.

After he retired from playing, Kpakor became a football coach. He managed his former club, BCC Lions.

== Personal ==
Kpakor's son, Kelvin, is also a professional footballer.
