= Emmanuel Okocha =

Nigerian footballer (born 1968)

Personal information
- Date of birth: 20 December 1968 (age 57)
- Position: Midfielder

Senior career*
Years	Team	Apps	(Gls)
1987–1992	Enugu Rangers		
1992–1993	VfB Marburg		
1993–1994	Eintracht Haiger		
1994–1995	SV Wehen	2	(0)

International career
1990–1994	Nigeria	7	(1)
- * Club domestic league appearances and goals

Emmanuel Okocha (born 20 December 1968) is a Nigerian former footballer who played as a midfielder for Enugu Rangers, VfB Marburg, Eintracht Haiger and SV Wehen, as well as the Nigeria national team. He competed at the 1990 African Cup of Nations, and is the older brother of Jay-Jay Okocha.
