= Jean-Fidèle Diramba =

Gabonese football referee

Jean-Fidèle Diramba (15 June 1952 – 4 January 2022) was a football referee from the African state of Gabon. He is known for officiating the 1988 Summer Olympics in Seoul, South Korea. Diramba officiated the 1990 Africa Cup of Nations Final in Algiers between Algeria and Nigeria.

Jean-Fidele Diramba was the referee in a World Cup USA '1994 qualifying match between Morocco and Zambia. Morocco won the match 1-0. The officiating created a lot of controversy from the Zambian side due to a number of decisions. Being from Gabon, off whose coast the Zambian team perished, increased the tensions since the Gabonese allegedly were impeding the progress of the investigation into the airplane crash. Protests were held in Lusaka the following day. FAZ (Football Association of Zambia) filed a protest with FIFA regarding the incident but complained about matters other than the refereeing. This action was not brought under scrutiny.

Diramba was an amateur golfer. He played in the 2008 Eisenhower Trophy.
