= Abdellah Liegeon =

Algerian footballer (1957–2025)

Personal information
- Full name: Abdellah Medjadi-Liégeon
- Date of birth: 13 December 1957
- Place of birth: Oran, French Algeria
- Date of death: 27 August 2025 (aged 67)
- Place of death: Lons-le-Saunier, France
- Position: Right-back

Youth career
- 1972–1975: Lons-le-Saunier

Senior career*
Years	Team	Apps	(Gls)
1975–1981	Besançon		
1981–1987	Monaco	136	(5)
1987–1989	Strasbourg	36	(1)

International career
1982–1986	Algeria	5	(0)
- * Club domestic league appearances and goals

Abdellah Medjadi-Liégeon (Arabic: عبد الله مجادي ليوجيون; 13 December 1957 – 27 August 2025) was an Algerian footballer who played as a right-back. He spent most of his club career in France with Racing Besançon and AS Monaco, winning the Ligue 1 title in 1982 and the Coupe de France in 1985 with Monaco. Internationally, he earned five caps for Algeria and appeared at the 1986 FIFA World Cup.

== Early life ==
Liégeon was born on 10 December 1957 in Oran. He moved to France a few years later. He was raised by his mother following his parents' divorce, and took the surname of his adoptive father on his mother's decision.

== Career ==
=== Club career ===
Liégeon played for RC Lons between 1972 and 1975. He began his professional career with Racing Besançon in 1975, following an unsuccessful trial at AS Saint-Étienne, and remained there until 1981, over 100 appearances. He then joined AS Monaco, where he made 136 appearances and scored five goals between 1981 and 1987, winning the French Division 1 title in 1982 and the Coupe de France in 1985.

Liégeon ended his playing career with RC Strasbourg, retiring in 1989 after helping the club win the Division 2 championship the year prior. After his retirement, he returned to the Jura prefecture town, where he remained active in local football.

=== International career ===
After winning the French Division 1 title with AS Monaco, Liégeon was approached by Michel Hidalgo, then coach of the France national football team, with an invitation to join the squad for the 1982 FIFA World Cup alongside teammate Manuel Amoros. He declined the opportunity and opted to represent Algeria instead. In an interview, Liégeon explained his decision in personal terms, stating:

The day I was contacted by the Algerian Football Federation, I thought only of making my mother proud. When I called her to ask what she thought, she broke down in tears on the phone. You cannot imagine the joy it gave her to learn that her son would represent the colors of his country of origin. For me, it was the heart that spoke, that's all.

Liégeon received his first call-up to the Algeria national football team in 1982. He appeared in two preparatory matches but was not selected for the 1982 FIFA World Cup in Spain by coach Mahieddine Khalef following disciplinary issues. He returned to the squad in 1985, earning five caps in total, including appearances in a qualifying fixture and two matches at the 1986 FIFA World Cup, among them the group-stage encounters with Brazil and Northern Ireland. During the match against Brazil, a miscommunication between Liégeon and the goalkeeper led to the only goal of the match. He was not recalled after the World Cup.

== Later life and death ==
After retiring from professional football, Liégeon suffered a stroke which temporarily impaired his speech. He underwent two and a half years of therapy before regaining normal speech.

In 2010, Liégeon returned to football as coach of CS Passenans, a district-level club in Jura. In August 2014, he was appointed coach of another Jura club, FC Macornay, which competed in the district second division. In September 2015, shortly before the start of the season, he stopped coaching the team.

Liégeon died on 27 August 2025, at the age of 67, after a long illness.

== Honours ==
Monaco

- Coupe de France: 1985
- Ligue 1 champion: 1982
