= Mohamed Kaci-Saïd =

Algerian footballer (born 1958)

Personal information
- Date of birth: 2 May 1958 (age 68)
- Place of birth: Algiers, Algeria
- Height: 1.74 m (5 ft 8 1/2 in)
- Position: Midfielder

Senior career*
Years	Team	Apps	(Gls)
1978–1987	RC Kouba		
1987–1988	USM Annaba		

International career
1980–1988	Algeria	57	(0)
- * Club domestic league appearances and goals

Mohamed Kaci-Saïd (born 2 May 1958) is an Algerian football midfielder who played for Algeria in the 1986 FIFA World Cup. He also played for RC Kouba.

== Doping mystery ==
In November 2011 Kaci-Saïd, who has a disabled daughter, and other of his World Cup Finals teammates called for an investigation into whether their children's disabilities had in any way to do with medication ordered to them by Algeria's Soviet coach Evgeni Rogov.

== Honours ==
=== With clubs ===
- Algerian League Champion in 1981 with RC Kouba

=== With the Algerian national team ===
- Participations in the 1986 FIFA World Cup in Mexico
- 3rd in the African Cup of Nations of 1984 in the Ivory Coast and 1988 in Morocco
