= Tahar Chérif El-Ouazzani =

Algerian footballer (born 1967)

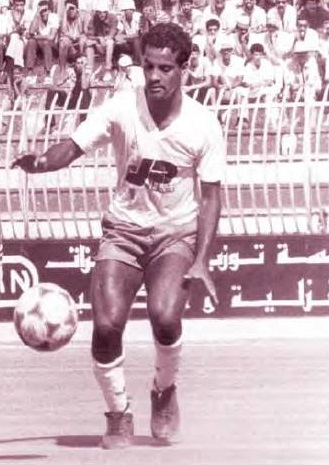
- TCO with MC Oran in 1985

Personal information
- Full name: Si-Tahar Chérif El-Ouazzani
- Date of birth: 10 July 1967 (age 59)
- Place of birth: Oran, Algeria
- Height: 1.70 m (5 ft 7 in)
- Position: Defensive midfielder

Team information
- Current team: MC Oran (head coach)

Youth career
- 1980–1983: MC Oran

Senior career*
Years	Team	Apps	(Gls)
1983–1990	MC Oran		
1990–1992	Aydınspor	37	(2)
1992–1993	MC Oran	33	(0)
1993–1995	Raja Casablanca		
1995–2002	MC Oran		

International career
1984–1996	Algeria	55	(2)

Managerial career
- 2003–2008: OM Arzew
- 2008: MC Oran
- 2009–2010: ASM Oran
- 2010–2011: MC Oran
- 2013–2014: RC Arbaâ
- 2015–2016: Paradou AC
- 2016–2018: USM Bel-Abbès
- 2018: CR Belouizdad
- 2019–2020: MC Oran
- 2020–2021: RC Relizane
- 2021–2022: Paradou AC
- 2024: JS Saoura
- 2024–25: US Biskra
- 2026–: MC Oran
- * Club domestic league appearances and goals

Si-Tahar Chérif El-Ouazzani (Arabic: سي الطاهر شريف الوزاني; born 10 July 1967) is an Algerian former professional footballer who played as a defensive midfielder.

== Career ==
Born in Oran, Chérif El-Ouazzani started his career with hometown MC Oran in 1983. In his first season, he would lead the club to its first league title in 17 years. The following season he led the team to the final of the African Cup of Champions Clubs where they lost a controversial match-up on penalties to Raja Casablanca. He would play one more season for MC Oran, winning the 1990 African Cup of Nations before signing his first professional contract with Turkish club Aydinspor, joining fellow Algerian Djamel Amani at the club. He played two season in Turkey before returning to Algeria. The following year he would lead MC Oran to the league title for a second time before leaving again, this time for Moroccan side Raja Casablanca. After two trophy-less years in Morocco, he returned for a third stint with MC Oran. He would lead the team to the Algerian Cup in 1996 as well as back-to-back Arab Cup Winners Cups in 1997 and 1998. The following year they also won the Arab Super Cup, defeating Syrian side Al Jaish in the final. He played with MC Oran until his retirement in 2002.

In 2003, he became coach of OM Arzew and was in control of the team until February 2008 when he was announced as the coach of MC Oran.

== Personal life ==
Chérif El-Ouazzani is one of seven siblings; his brother Abdennour Chérif El-Ouazzani is also a professional footballer. Chérif El-Ouazzani's son Hichem Chérif El-Ouazzani is also a professional footballer and international for Algeria.

== Honours ==
MC Oran

- Algerian Championship: 1988, 1993; runner-up 1987, 1990, 1996, 1997, 2000
- Algerian Cup: 1984, 1985, 1996; runner-up 1998, 2002
- Algerian League Cup: 1996; runner-up 2000
- Arab Cup Winners Cup: 1997, 1998
- Arab Super Cup: 1999
- African Cup of Champions Clubs runner-up: 1989
- Arab Club Champions Cup runner-up: 2001

USM Bel Abbès

- Algerian Cup: 2018 (as a manager)

Algeria

- Africa Cup of Nations: 1990
- Afro-Asian Cup of Nations: 1991

Individual

- African Footballer of the Year: Silver award 1990
- 1990 African Cup of Nations: 2nd best player
