= 1990 African Cup of Nations =

17th edition of the Africa Cup of Nations

1990 كأس أمم إفريقيا; Coupe d'Afrique des Nations 1990
- African Cup of Nations 1990 official logo

Tournament details
- Host country: Algeria
- Dates: 2–16 March
- Teams: 8
- Venues: 2 (in 2 host cities)

Final positions
- Champions: Algeria (1st title)
- Runners-up: Nigeria
- Third place: Zambia
- Fourth place: Senegal

Tournament statistics
- Matches played: 16
- Goals scored: 30 (1.88 per match)
- Attendance: 600,032 (37,502 per match)
- Top scorer: (Algeria) Djamel Menad (4 goals)
- Best player: (Algeria) Rabah Madjer

The 1990 African Cup of Nations was the 17th edition of the African Cup of Nations, the international football championship run by the Confederation of African Football (CAF). It was hosted by Algeria. Just like in 1988, the field of eight teams was split into two groups of four.

Hosts Algeria won a first championship, defeating Nigeria 1–0 in the final.

== Qualified teams ==
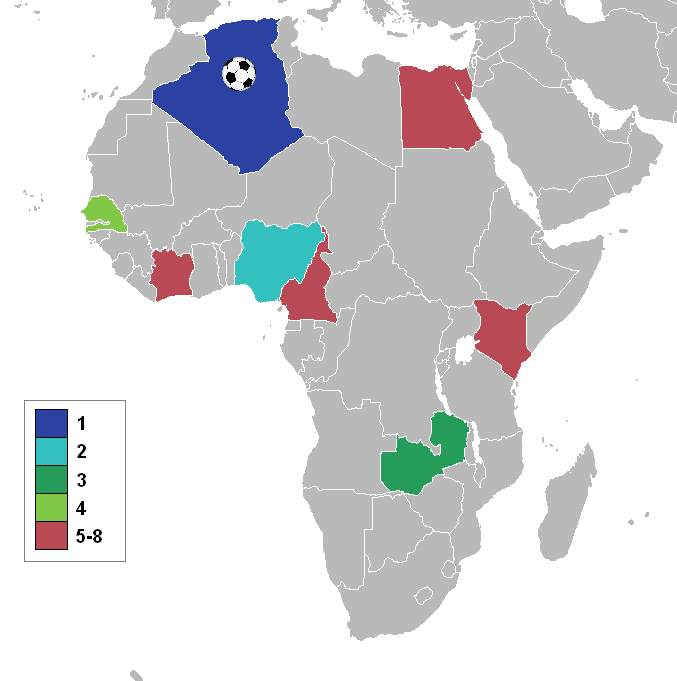
Participating nations

The 8 qualified teams are:

| Team | Qualified as | Qualified on | Previous appearances in tournament (Note: Bold indicates champion for that year, Italic indicates host.) |
|---|---|---|---|
| Algeria | Hosts | | 6 (1968, 1980, 1982, 1984, 1986, 1988) |
| Cameroon | Holders | 27 March 1988 | 6 (1970, 1972, 1982, **1984**, 1986, **1988**) |
| Senegal | 2nd round winners | 16 July 1989 | 3 (1965, 1968, 1986) |
| Kenya | 2nd round winners | 29 July 1989 | 2 (1972, 1988) |
| Egypt | 2nd round winners | 30 July 1989 | 11 (**1957**, **1959**, 1962, 1963, 1970, 1974, 1976, 1980, 1984, **1986**, 1988) |
| Ivory Coast | 2nd round winners | 30 July 1989 | 8 (1965, 1968, 1970, 1974, 1980, 1984, 1986, 1988) |
| Nigeria | 2nd round winners | 30 July 1989 | 7 (1963, 1976, 1978, **1980**, 1982, 1984, 1988) |
| Zambia | 2nd round winners | 30 July 1989 | 4 (1974, 1978, 1982, 1986) |

== Venues ==
The competition was played in two venues in Algiers and Annaba.

| Algiers | 1990 African Cup of Nations is located in Algeria |
| Stade du 5 Juillet | 1990 African Cup of Nations is located in Algeria |
| Capacity: 85,000 | 1990 African Cup of Nations is located in Algeria |
| Annaba | 1990 African Cup of Nations is located in Algeria |
| Stade du 19 Mai | 1990 African Cup of Nations is located in Algeria |
| Capacity: 56,000 | 1990 African Cup of Nations is located in Algeria |

== Match officials ==
Referees

- Laurent Petcha (Cameroon)
- Mohamed Hussam El-Dine (Egypt)
- Jean-Fidèle Diramba (Gabon)
- (The Gambia) Badou Jasseh (Gambia)
- Idrissa Traoré (Mali)
- Idrissa Sarr (Mauritania)
- Eganaden Cadressen (Mauritius)
- Abdellali Naciri (Morocco)
- Badara Sène (Senegal)
- Ally Hafidhi (Tanzania)
- Mawukpona Hounnake-Kouassi (Togo)
- Naji Jouini (Tunisia)

Invited referees

- Shizuo Takada (Japan)
- Jamal Al Sharif (Syria)

== Group stage ==
=== Tiebreakers ===
If two or more teams finished level on points after completion of the group matches, the following tie-breakers were used to determine the final ranking:

1. Greatest total goal difference in the three group matches
2. Greatest number of goals scored in the three group matches
3. Most points earned in matches against other teams in the tie
4. Greatest goal difference in matches against other teams in the tie
5. Greatest number of goals scored in matches against other teams in the tie
6. Drawing of lots

=== Group A ===
| Pos | Team | Pld | W | D | L | GF | GA | GD | Pts | Qualification |
|---|---|---|---|---|---|---|---|---|---|---|
| 1 | Algeria (H) | 3 | 3 | 0 | 0 | 10 | 1 | +9 | 6 | Advance to Knockout stage |
| 2 | Nigeria | 3 | 2 | 0 | 1 | 3 | 5 | −2 | 4 | Advance to Knockout stage |
| 3 | Ivory Coast | 3 | 1 | 0 | 2 | 3 | 5 | −2 | 2 | |
| 4 | Egypt | 3 | 0 | 0 | 3 | 1 | 6 | −5 | 0 | |

Rules for classification: Group stage tiebreakers
(H) Hosts
2 March 1990

| Algeria | 5–1 | Nigeria |
|---|---|---|
| Madjer 36', 58'; Menad 69', 72'; Amani 88' | Report | Okocha 82' |

Stade 5 Juillet 1962, Algiers
Attendance: 65,000
Referee: Shizuo Takada (Japan)

2 March 1990

| Ivory Coast | 3–1 | Egypt |
|---|---|---|
| A. Traoré 53', 60'; Maguy 73' | Report | Abdelrahman 75' |

Stade 5 Juillet 1962, Algiers
Attendance: 7,000
Referee: Ally Hafidhi (Tanzania)

5 March 1990

| Nigeria | 1–0 | Egypt |
|---|---|---|
| Yekini 8' | Report |

Stade 5 Juillet 1962, Algiers
Attendance: 47,000
Referee: Laurent Petcha (Cameroon)

5 March 1990

| Algeria | 3–0 | Ivory Coast |
|---|---|---|
| Menad 23'; El-Ouazzani 81'; Oudjani 82' | Report |

Stade 5 Juillet 1962, Algiers
Attendance: 75,000
Referee: Idrissa Sarr (Mauritania)

8 March 1990

| Nigeria | 1–0 | Ivory Coast |
|---|---|---|
| Yekini 3' | Report |

Stade 5 Juillet 1962, Algiers
Attendance: 80,000
Referee: Abdellali Naciri (Morocco)

8 March 1990

| Algeria | 2–0 | Egypt |
|---|---|---|
| Amani 39'; Saïb 43' | Report |

Stade 5 Juillet 1962, Algiers
Attendance: 86,000
Referee: Eganaden Cadressen (Mauritius)

=== Group B ===
| Pos | Team | Pld | W | D | L | GF | GA | GD | Pts | Qualification |
|---|---|---|---|---|---|---|---|---|---|---|
| 1 | Zambia | 3 | 2 | 1 | 0 | 2 | 0 | +2 | 5 | Advance to Knockout stage |
| 2 | Senegal | 3 | 1 | 2 | 0 | 2 | 0 | +2 | 4 | Advance to Knockout stage |
| 3 | Cameroon | 3 | 1 | 0 | 2 | 2 | 3 | −1 | 2 | |
| 4 | Kenya | 3 | 0 | 1 | 2 | 0 | 3 | −3 | 1 | |

Rules for classification: Group stage tiebreakers
3 March 1990

| Zambia | 1–0 | Cameroon |
|---|---|---|
| Chikabala 58' | Report |

Stade 19 Mai 1956, Annaba
Attendance: 8,000
Referee: Naji Jouini (Tunisia)

3 March 1990

| Senegal | 0–0 | Kenya |
|---|---|---|
| | Report |

Stade 19 Mai 1956, Annaba
Attendance: 13,000
Referee: Idrissa Traoré (Mali)

6 March 1990

| Zambia | 1–0 | Kenya |
|---|---|---|
| Makwaza 40' | Report |

Stade 19 Mai 1956, Annaba
Attendance: 6,000
Referee: Mawukpona Hounnake-Kouassi (Togo)

6 March 1990

| Senegal | 2–0 | Cameroon |
|---|---|---|
| Diallo 45'; N'Dao 56' | Report |

Stade 19 Mai 1956, Annaba
Attendance: 12,000
Referee: Jamal Al Sharif (Syria)

9 March 1990

| Zambia | 0–0 | Senegal |
|---|---|---|
| | Report |

Stade 19 Mai 1956, Annaba
Attendance: 10,000
Referee: Mohamed Hussam El-Dine (Egypt)

9 March 1990

| Cameroon | 2–0 | Kenya |
|---|---|---|
| Maboang 28', 69' | Report |

Stade 19 Mai 1956, Annaba
Attendance: 6,000
Referee: Badou Jasseh (Gambia)

== Knockout stage ==
=== Bracket ===
Semi-finals
12 March – Annaba
Zambia | 0
Nigeria | 2
12 March – Algiers
Algeria | 2
Senegal | 1

Final
16 March – Algiers
Nigeria | 0
Algeria | 1
Third place
15 March – Algiers
Zambia | 1
Senegal | 0

=== Semi-finals ===
12 March 1990

| Zambia | 0–2 | Nigeria |
|---|---|---|
| | Report | Okechukwu 18'; Yekini 77' |

Stade 19 Mai 1956, Annaba
Attendance: 12,000
Referee: Badara Sène (Senegal)

12 March 1990

| Algeria | 2–1 | Senegal |
|---|---|---|
| Menad 4'; Amani 62' | Report | Serrar 20' (o.g.) |

Stade 5 Juillet 1962, Algiers
Attendance: 65,000
Referee: Shizuo Takada (Japan)

=== Third place match ===
15 March 1990

| Zambia | 1–0 | Senegal |
|---|---|---|
| Chikabala 73' | Report |

Stade 5 Juillet 1962, Algiers
Attendance: 3,000
Referee: Naji Jouini (Tunisia)

=== Final ===
16 March 1990
16:00

| Algeria | 1–0 | Nigeria |
|---|---|---|
| Oudjani 38' | Report |

Stade 5 Juillet 1962, Algiers
Attendance: 105,032
Referee: Jean-Fidèle Diramba (Gabon)

== Statistics and awards ==
=== Goalscorers ===
There were 30 goals scored in 16 matches, for an average of 1.88 goals per match.

4 goals

- (Algeria) Djamel Menad

3 goals

- (Algeria) Djamel Amani
- (Nigeria) Rashidi Yekini

2 goals

- (Algeria) Rabah Madjer
- (Algeria) Chérif Oudjani
- (Cameroon) Emmanuel Maboang
- (Ivory Coast) Abdoulaye Traoré
- (Zambia) Webster Chikabala

1 goal

- (Algeria) Tahar Chérif El-Ouazzani
- (Algeria) Moussa Saïb
- (Ivory Coast) Serge Maguy
- (Egypt) Adel Abdel Rahman
- (Nigeria) Uche Okechukwu
- (Nigeria) Emmanuel Okocha
- (Senegal) Mamadou Diallo
- (Senegal) Moussa N'Dao
- (Zambia) Linos Makwaza

1 own goal

- (Algeria) Abdelhakim Serrar (against Senegal)

=== Player of the Tournament ===
1 (Algeria) Rabah Madjer (76 pts)
2 (Algeria) Tahar Chérif El-Ouazzani
3 (Algeria) Djamel Menad
– (Nigeria) Rashidi Yekini
– (Zambia) Webster Chikabala

=== Team of the Tournament ===
| Goalkeeper | Defenders | Midfielders | Forwards |
|---|---|---|---|
| (Algeria) Antar Osmani | (Algeria) Ali Benhalima (Cameroon) André Kana-Biyik (Ivory Coast) Arsène Hobou (Zambia) Samuel Chomba | (Algeria) Djamel Amani (Algeria) Rabah Madjer (Algeria) Tahar Chérif El-Ouazzani (Nigeria) Moses Kpakor | (Algeria) Djamel Menad (Zambia) Webster Chikabala |
