= Fodil Megharia =

Algerian footballer (born 1961)

Personal information
- Full name: Fodil Megharia
- Date of birth: 23 May 1961 (age 65)
- Place of birth: Chlef, Algeria
- Height: 1.85 m (6 ft 1 in)
- Position: Defender

Youth career
- 1979–1980: ASO Chlef

Senior career*
Years	Team	Apps	(Gls)
1980–1989	ASO Chlef	-	(-)
1989–1993	Club Africain	-	(-)
1993–1995	ASO Chlef	-	(-)

International career
1984–1992	Algeria	68	(0)
- * Club domestic league appearances and goals

Fodil Megharia (Arabic: فوضيل مغارية; born 23 May 1961) is an Algerian former footballer who played as a defender. He spent his entire club career with ASO Chlef (Algeria) and Club Africain (Tunisia), with whom he won the 1991 African Cup of Champions Clubs.

== Career ==
An Algerian international, Megharia had 68 caps for the Algeria National Team and represented the team at the 1986 FIFA World Cup in Mexico. He was also a member of the 1990 African Cup of Nations winning team. He also played for Algeria at the 1986, 1988 and 1992 African Cup of Nations.

== Honours ==
=== With clubs ===
- Tunisian Ligue 1 champion in 1990 and 1992 with Club Africain
- Tunisian Ligue 1 runners-up in 1989 and 1991 with Club Africain
- Tunisian Cup winner in 1992 with Club Africain
- Tunisian Cup runners-up in 1989 with Club Africain
- CAF Champions League winner in 1991 with Club Africain
- African Cup Winners' Cup runners-up in 1990 with Club Africain
- Afro-Asian Club Championship winner in 1992 with Club Africain

=== With the Algerian national team ===
- Won the 1990 Africa Cup of Nations once in Algeria
- Won the 1991 Afro-Asian Cup of Nations
- 1 participations in the 1986 FIFA World Cup in Mexico
