= Chérif Oudjani =

Algerian footballer (born 1964)

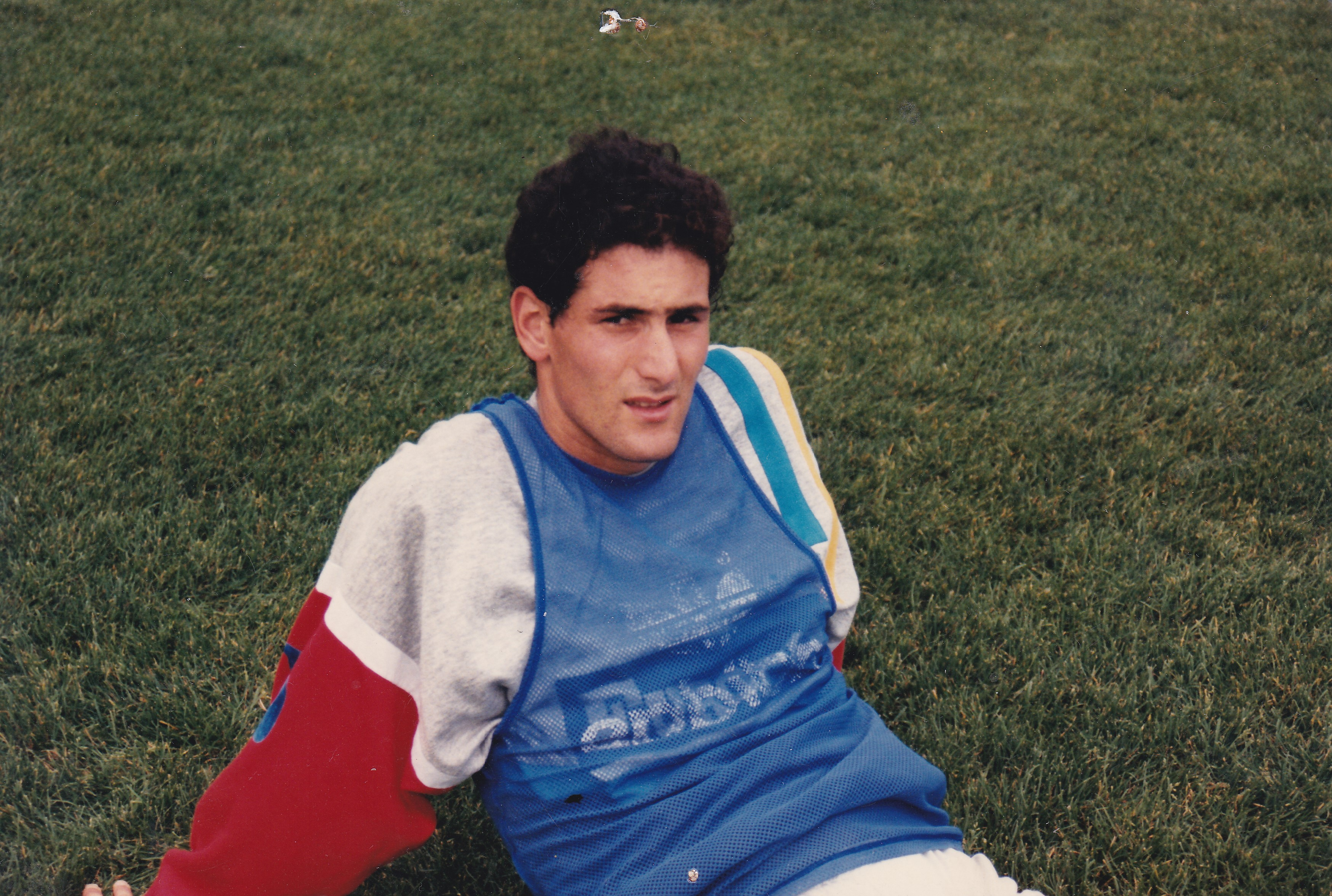
- Oudjani training with Lens

Personal information
- Date of birth: 9 December 1964 (age 61)
- Place of birth: Lens, France
- Height: 1.87 m (6 ft 2 in)
- Position: Striker

Senior career*
Years	Team	Apps	(Gls)
1983–1985	Lens	25	(8)
1985–1986	Laval	31	(14)
1986–1989	Lens	75	(31)
1989–1992	Sochaux	69	(13)
1992–1994	Beauvais	24	(9)
1994–1996	Charleville	71	(19)
1996–1997	Épinal	15	(0)
1997–1998	Gazélec Ajaccio	28	(14)
1998–1999	Wasquehal	23	(8)
1999–2000	Valenciennes	15	(6)
2000–2001	Pacy Vallée-d'Eure	17	(3)
2001–2002	Stade Béthunois		

International career
1986–1992	Algeria	8	(2)
- * Club domestic league appearances and goals

Chérif Oudjani (born 9 December 1964) is a former professional footballer who played as a striker, spending his career in France. Born in France, he played for the Algeria national team internationally, most notably winning the 1990 African Cup of Nations. He is the son of Algerian international footballer Ahmed Oudjani.
