= Nacerdine Drid =

Algerian footballer (born 1957)

Personal information
- Full name: Nacerdine Drid
- Date of birth: 22 January 1957 (age 69)
- Place of birth: Tébessa, Algeria
- Height: 1.80 m (5 ft 11 in)
- Position: Goalkeeper

Youth career
- 1973–1977: JSM Tébessa

Senior career*
Years	Team	Apps	(Gls)
1977–1978	JSM Tébessa		
1978–1980	USM El Harrach		
1980–1985	ESM Bel-Abbès		
1985–1988	MP Oran / M. Oran		
1988–1989	Raja Casablanca		
1989–1990	MC Oran		

International career
1982–1988	Algeria	44	(0)
- * Club domestic league appearances and goals

Nacerdine Drid known as Nasser Drid (born 22 January 1957) is a retired Algeria international footballer who played as a goalkeeper for the Algeria national team and Algerian club sides USM El-Harrach, USM Bel-Abbès and MC Oran.

He played with Morocco's Raja CA Casablanca in 1988 and 1989. He returned to Algeria and finished his career with MC Oran till 1990.

== Honours ==
=== With clubs ===
- Algerian League champion in 1988 with MC Oran
  - 2nd in the Algerian League in 1987, 1990 with MC Oran
- CAF Champions League winner in 1989 with Raja CA Casablanca

=== With the Algerian national team ===
- 3rd in the Africa Cup of Nations 1984 in Côte d'Ivoire and 1988 in Morocco
- Bronze medal in the Pan Arab Games 1985 in Casablanca
- Participation in FIFA World Cup of 1986 in Mexico
