= Djamel Amani =

Algerian footballer (born 1962)

Personal information
- Date of birth: 17 June 1962 (age 64)
- Place of birth: Larbaâ, Algeria
- Position: Midfielder

Youth career
- RC Arbaâ

Senior career*
Years	Team	Apps	(Gls)
1980–1983	RC Arbaâ	-	(-)
1983–1987	CR Belouizdad	-	(-)
1987–1988	USM Alger	-	(-)
1988–1989	Antwerp	-	(-)
1990–1995	Aydınspor	95	(6)

International career
1986–1990	Algeria	25	(5)
- * Club domestic league appearances and goals

Djamel Amani (Arabic: أماني جمال; born 17 June 1962) is an Algerian former professional footballer who played as a midfielder.

== Club career ==
He played for USM Alger in Algeria, Royal Antwerp FC in Belgium and Aydınspor in Turkey.

== International career ==
Amani was also part of the Algeria national football team, scoring 5 international goals in 25 games.
