= Djamel Menad =

Algerian footballer (1960–2025)

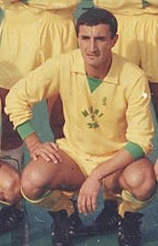
- Menad in 1986

Personal information
- Date of birth: 22 July 1960
- Place of birth: El Bayadh, Algeria
- Date of death: 22 March 2025 (aged 64)
- Place of death: Algiers, Algeria
- Height: 1.75 m (5 ft 9 in)
- Position: Forward

Youth career
- 1975–1977: JS El Biar

Senior career*
Years	Team	Apps	(Gls)
1977–1981	CR Belouizdad		
1981–1987	JS Kabylie		
1987–1990	Nîmes	78	(27)
1990–1992	Famalicão	58	(17)
1992–1993	Belenenses	26	(3)
1993–1994	Al-Najma		
1994–1996	JS Kabylie		
1996–1997	USM Alger		
Total		162	(47)

International career
1980–1995	Algeria	81	(25)

Managerial career
- 1995–1996: JS Kabylie (playing assistant)
- 2005: USM Alger
- 2005–2006: USM Annaba
- 2008–2009: JSM Béjaïa
- 2011–2012: CR Belouizdad
- 2012–2013: MC Alger
- 2014: Al-Wehda Club
- 2016: MC Alger
- 2017–2018: Algeria (assistant)
- 2020–2021: USM El Harrach
- 2023: JS Kabylie (director of sport)
- * Club domestic league appearances and goals

Djamel Menad (Arabic: جمال مناد; 22 July 1960 – 22 March 2025) was an Algerian professional footballer who played as a forward.

== Club career ==
Born in El Bayadh, Menad started his playing career with CR Belouizdad, before moving to JS Kabylie. In 1987, he signed with French side Nîmes, competing in three Ligue 2 seasons and appearing in nearly 100 official games. In 1989–90, he scored a career-best – in Europe – 12 goals in 27 games, but his team fell short of promotion after finishing in third position.

Menad spent the following three seasons in Portugal, appearing for Famalicão (two seasons) and Belenenses, always in the top division. Subsequently, aged 33, he returned to his country and retired four years later, after stints with former club Kabylie (where he won the African Cup Winners' Cup in 1995) and USM Alger.

In 2005, Menad started coaching, managing his last team as a player. On 14 May 2011, he was fired from his post at JSM Bejaia.

== International career ==
Menad gained the first of his 81 caps for Algeria in 1982. Previously, in 1980, he played Olympic football in Moscow, helping the national team to the quarterfinals.

Menad was selected to the squad for the 1986 FIFA World Cup. There, he appeared in group stage losses against Brazil and Spain. Menad finished third for the 1986 African Footballer of the Year award.

In 1990, he helped the hosts win the Africa Cup of Nations, finishing as the competition's top scorer with four goals.

== Doping mystery ==
In November 2011, Menad, who had a disabled daughter, and his other World Cup Finals teammates called for an investigation into whether their children's disabilities had anything to do with medication ordered to them by Algeria's Soviet coach Evgeni Rogov.

== Managerial career ==
Menad was appointed manager of USM El Harrach in October 2020.

== Death ==
Menad died on 22 March 2025, at the age of 64.

== Honours ==
CR Belouizdad

- Algerian Cup: 1977–78

JS Kabylie

- African Cup of champions clubs: 1981
- African Super Cup: 1982
- African Cup Winners' Cup: 1995
- Algerian League: 1981–82, 1982–83, 1984–85, 1985–86, 1994–95
- Algerian Cup: 1985–86

Algeria

- Africa Cup of Nations: 1990

Individual

- Africa Cup of Nations top scorer: 1990
- Africa Cup of Nations Team of the Tournament:1984, 1990
