= List of Algeria national football team managers =

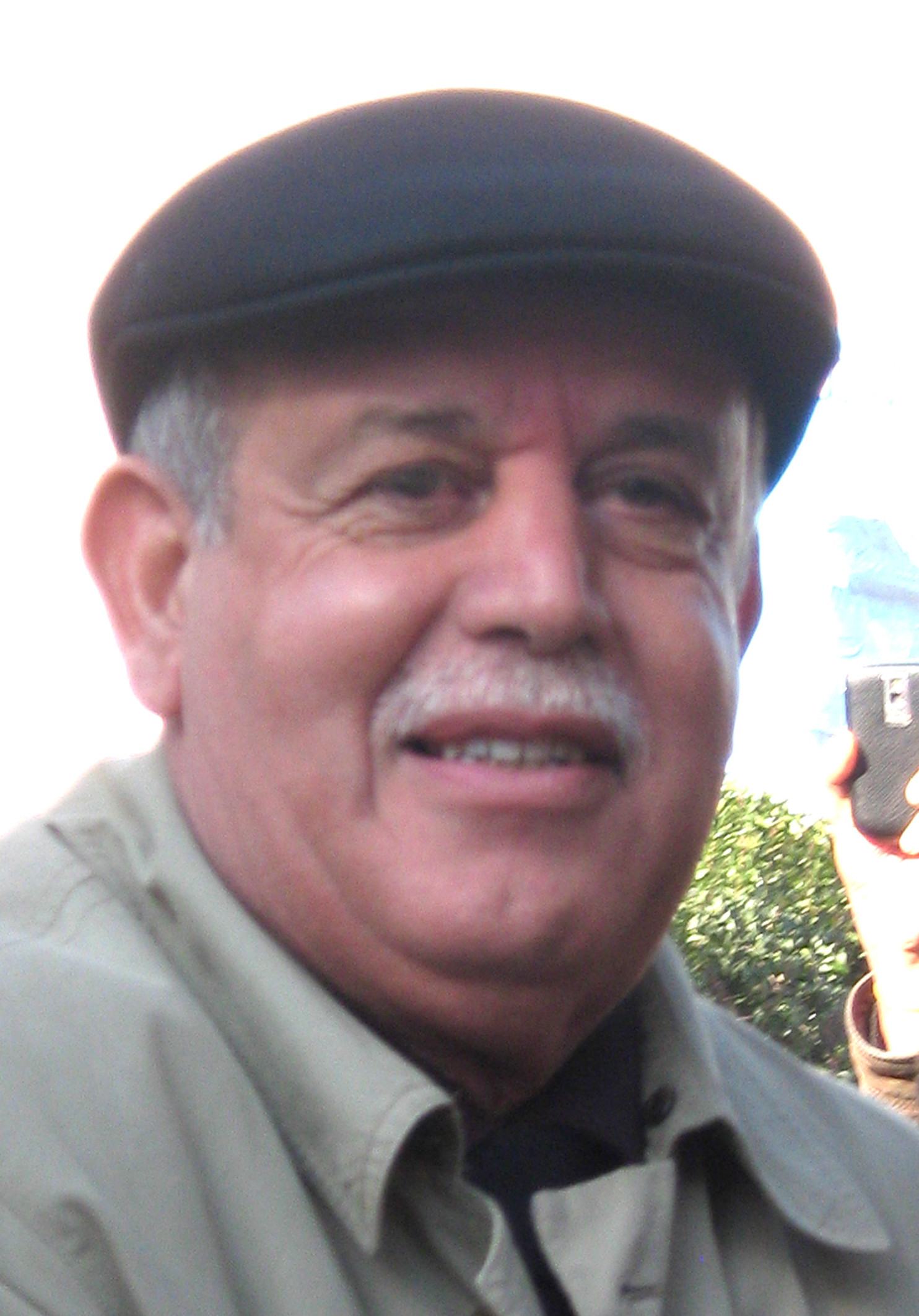
Rabah Saâdane the emblematic Algerian national team manager.

The Algeria national football team manager was first established on January 1st, 1963 following the appointment of the country's first national team manager Kader Firoud.

== Statistics ==
=== Official managers ===
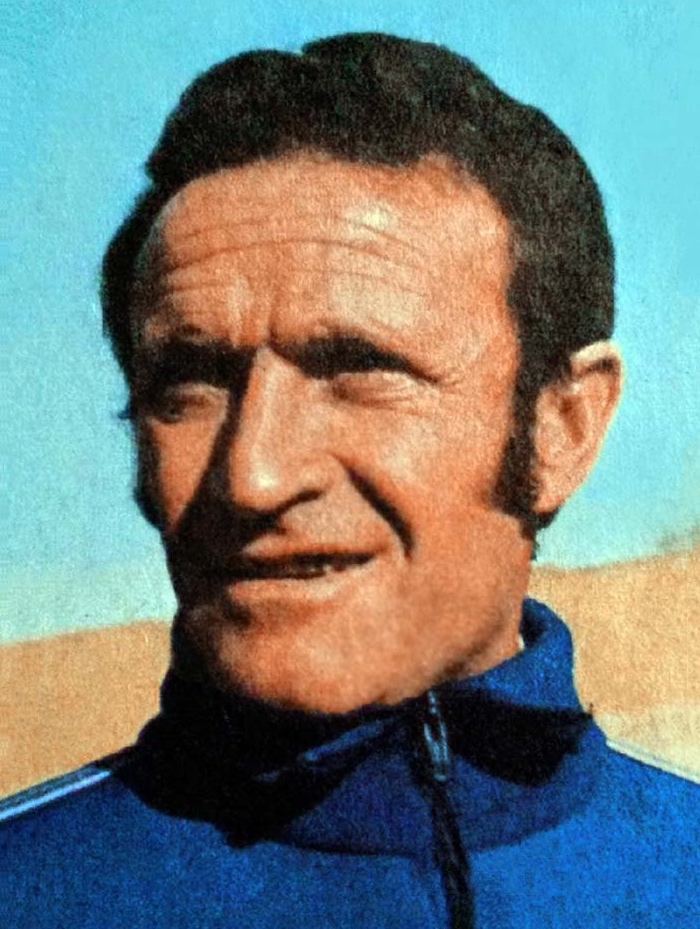
Zdravko Rajkov.

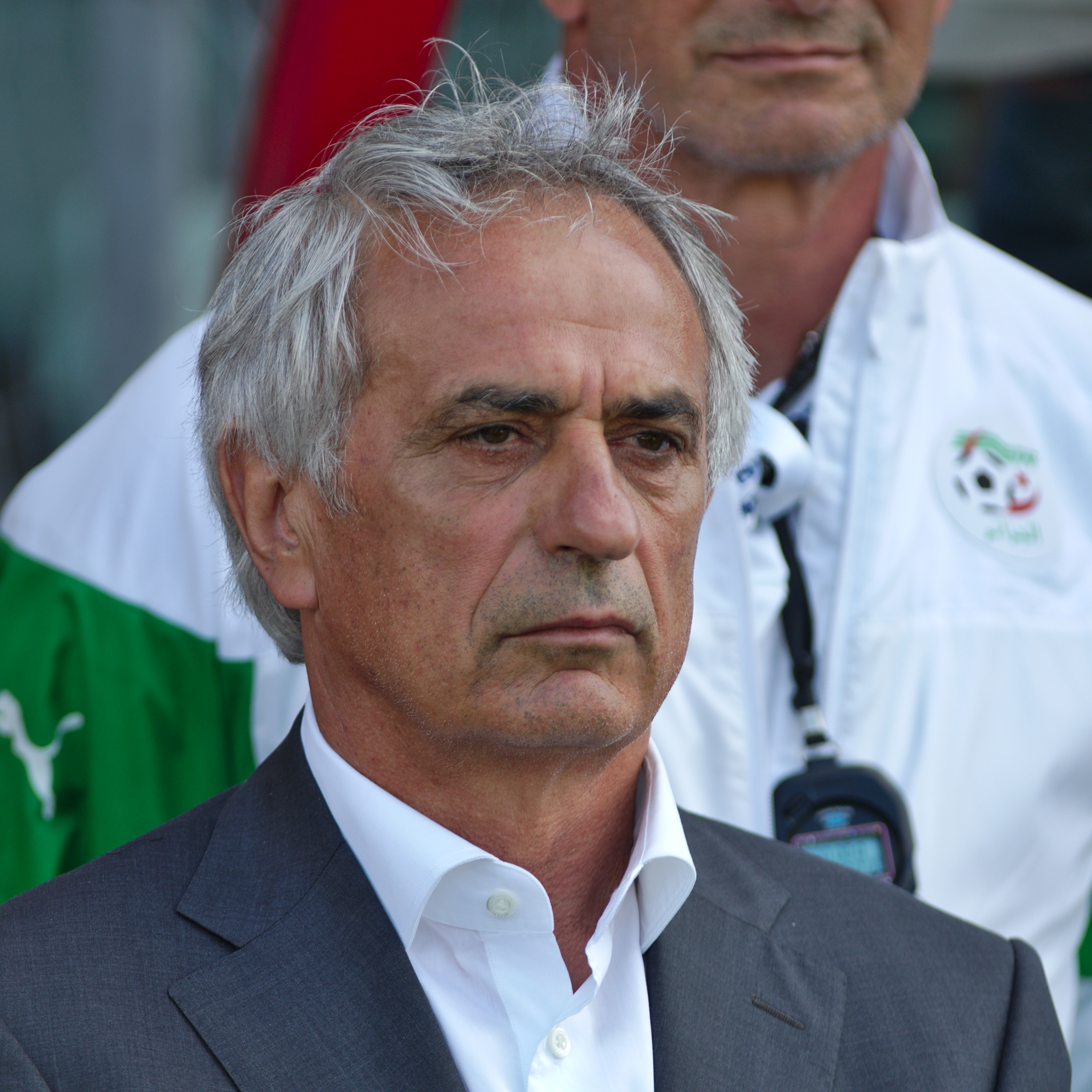
Vahid Halilhodžić.

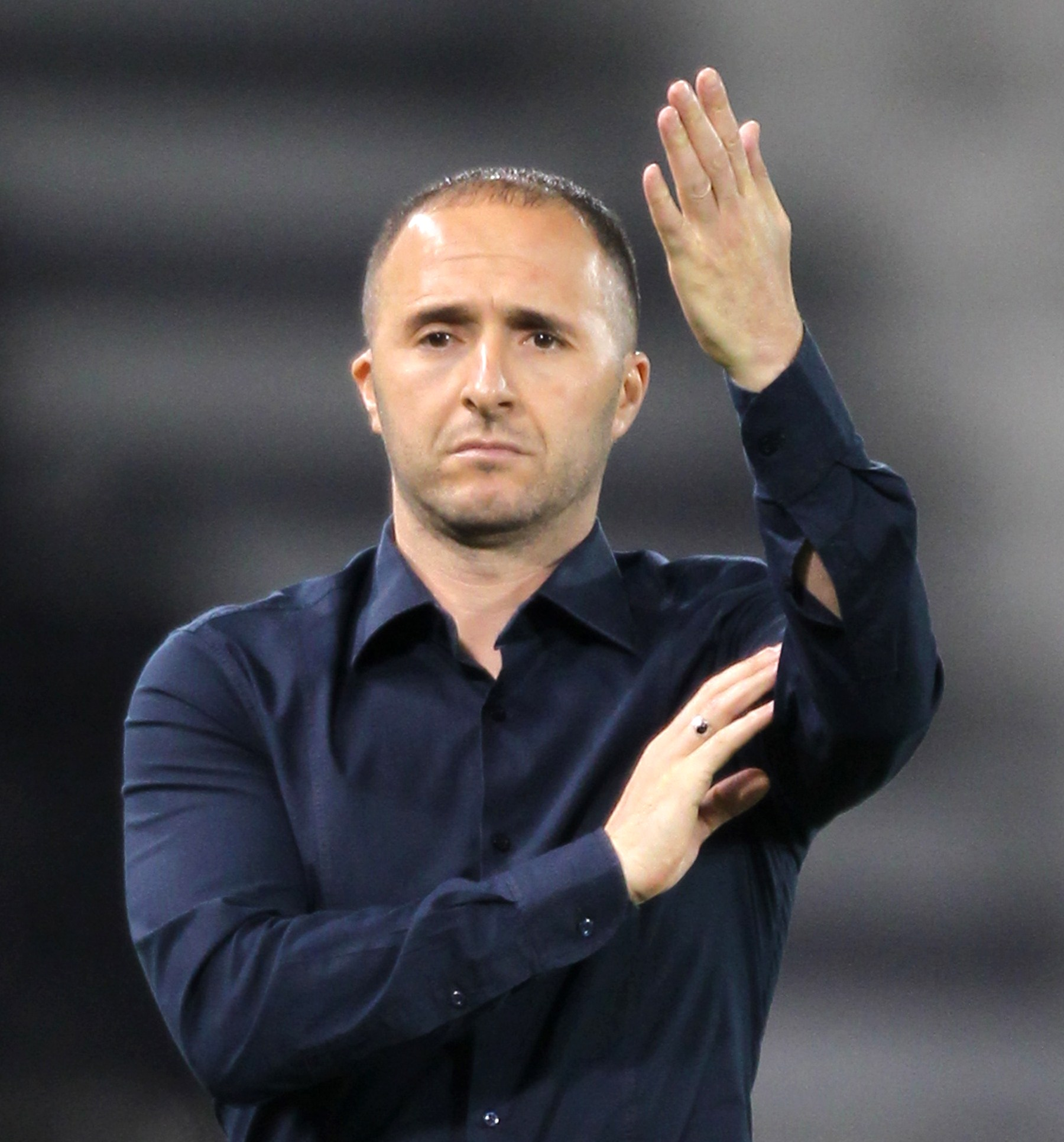
Djamel Belmadi.

Manager	Algeria career	Played	Won	Drawn	Lost	Win %	Competitions
(Algeria) Kader Firoud	1963	3	1	1	1	33.3	
(Algeria) Smaïl Khabatou	1963–1964	7	2	4	1	28.6	
(Algeria) Abderrahman Ibrir	1964–1965	4	2	1	1	50.0	
(Algeria) Smaïl Khabatou	1965–1966	3	0	2	1	0.0	
(France) Lucien Leduc	1966–1969	19	7	5	7	36.8	1968 African Cup – Group stage
(Algeria) Saïd Amara	1969	2	1	0	1	50.0	
(Algeria) Hamid Zouba (Algeria) Abdelaziz Ben Tifour	1969–1970						
(Algeria) Hamid Zouba	1970–1971						
(Algeria) Rachid Mekhloufi	1971–1972						
(Algeria) Mohamed El Kenz (Algeria) Abdelhamid Sellal	1972–1973	6	3	1	2	50.0	
(Algeria) Saïd Amara	1973						
(Romania) Dumitru Macri	1974–1975	11	0	3	8	0.0	
(Algeria) Rachid Mekhloufi	1975–1979						
(Algeria) Mahieddine Khalef	1979						
(Socialist Federal Republic of Yugoslavia) Zdravko Rajkov (Algeria) Mahieddine Khalef	1979–1980	18	8	6	4	44.4	1980 African Cup – Finalist
(Socialist Federal Republic of Yugoslavia) Zdravko Rajkov	1980–1981						
(Soviet Union) Evgeni Rogov (Algeria) Mohamed Maouche	1981–1982	5	4	1	0	80.0	
(Algeria) Mahieddine Khalef (Algeria) Rachid Mekhloufi	1982	5	2	1	2	40.0	1980 African Cup – 4th Place
(Algeria) Mahieddine Khalef	1982	2	1	1	0	50.0	
(Algeria) Rachid Mekhloufi	1982	3	2	0	1	66.7	1982 World Cup – Group stage
(Algeria) Hamid Zouba	1982–1983	13	6	2	5	46.2	
(Algeria) Hamid Zouba (Algeria) Smaïl Khabatou	1984	1	0	1	0	0.0	
(Algeria) Mahieddine Khalef	1984	10	4	3	3	40.0	1984 African Cup – 3rd Place
(Algeria) Rabah Saadane	1984–1986	28	9	10	9	32.1	1986 African Cup – Group stage 1986 World Cup – Group stage
(Soviet Union) Evgeni Rogov	1986–1988	17	8	6	3	47.1	1988 African Cup – 3rd Place
(Algeria) Kamel Lemoui	1988–1989	22	8	9	5	36.4	
(Algeria) Abdelhamid Kermali	1989–1992	24	10	10	4	41.7	1990 African Cup – Champions; 1991 Afro-Asian Cup – Champions; 1992 African Cup – Group stage
(Algeria) Meziane Ighil	1992–1994	21	7	10	4	33.3	
(Algeria) Rabah Madjer	1994–1995	9	2	4	3	22.2	
(Algeria) Ali Fergani (Algeria) Mourad Abdelouahab	1995–1996	19	10	3	6	52.6	1996 African Cup – Quarter-finals
(Algeria) Hamid Zouba	1996–1997	5	1	3	1	20.0	
(Algeria) Abderrahmane Mehdaoui	1997–1998	14	6	1	7	42.9	1998 African Cup – Group stage
(Romania) Marcel Pigulea	1998	2	2	0	0	100.0	
(Algeria) Meziane Ighil	1998–1999	4	0	1	3	0.0	
(Algeria) Rabah Saadane	1999	1	0	1	0	0.0	
(Algeria) Boualem Charef	1999	3	2	0	1	66.7	
(Algeria) Rabah Madjer (Algeria) Tedj Bensaoula	1999	0	0	0	0	—	
(Algeria) Nacer Sandjak	1999–2000	7	2	3	2	28.6	
(Romania) Mircea Rădulescu (Algeria) Abdel Djaadaoui	2000–2001	14	5	5	4	35.7	2000 African Cup – Quarter-finals
(Algeria) Hamid Zouba (Algeria) Abdelhamid Kermali	2001	5	2	0	3	40.0	
(Algeria) Hamid Zouba (Algeria) Abdelhamid Kermali (Algeria) Azzedine Aït Djoudi	2001	1	0	1	0	0.0	
(Algeria) Rabah Madjer	2001–2002	9	2	3	4	22.2	2002 African Cup – Group stage
(Algeria) Hamid Zouba	2002–2003	5	3	2	0	60.0	
(Belgium) Georges Leekens	2003	6	2	2	2	33.3	
(Algeria) Rabah Saadane	2003–2004	10	4	3	3	40.0	2004 African Cup – Quarter-finals
(Belgium) Robert Waseige	2004	6	0	4	2	0.0	
(Algeria) Ali Fergani (Algeria) Lakhdar Belloumi	2004–2005	7	2	2	3	28.6	
(Algeria) Meziane Ighil	2005–2006	3	0	1	2	0.0	
(France) Jean-Michel Cavalli	2006–2007	12	4	3	5	33.3	
(Algeria) Rabah Saadane	2007–2010	32	15	6	11	46.9	2010 African Cup – 4th Place; 2010 World Cup – Group stage
(Algeria) Abdelhak Benchikha	2010–2011	4	1	1	2	25.0	
(Bosnia and Herzegovina) Vahid Halilhodžić	2011–2014	31	19	5	7	61.3	2013 African Cup – Group stage 2014 World Cup – Round of 16
(France) Christian Gourcuff	2014–2016	21	13	3	5	61.9	2015 African Cup – Quarter-finals
(Algeria) Nabil Neghiz	2016	1	1	0	0	100.0	
(Serbia) Milovan Rajevac	2016	2	1	1	0	50.0	
(Belgium) Georges Leekens	2016–2017	4	1	2	1	25.0	2017 African Cup – Group stage
(Spain) Lucas Alcaraz	2017	7	2	1	4	28.6	
(Algeria) Rabah Madjer	2017–2018	6	3	0	3	50.0	
(Algeria) Djamel Belmadi	2018–2024	64	41	17	6	64.1	2019 African Cup – Champions; 2021 African Cup – Group stage 2023 African Cup – Group stage
(Bosnia and Herzegovina) Vladimir Petković	2024–	32	23	5	4	71.9	2025 African Cup — Quarter-finals; 2026 World Cup

Managers in italics were hired as caretakers

== Managers ==
List of Algeria national football team managers by games
#	Manager	Period	G	W	D	L	Win %	Honours
1	(Algeria) Rabah Saâdane	1984 – 1986; 1999; 2003 – 2004; 2007 – 2010	72	28	21	23	39.44	
2	(Algeria) Djamel Belmadi	2018 – 2022	64	41	17	6	66.67	1 Africa Cup of Nations
3	(Algeria) Rachid Mekhloufi	1971 – 1979	57	29	9	19	50.88	
4	(Algeria) Abderrahmane Mehdaoui	1992 – 1993; 1996 – 1998	38	13	13	12	34.21	
5	(Algeria) Meziane Ighil	1992 – 1993; 1998; 1998 – 1999; 2005 – 2006	31	9	11	11	29.03	
6	(Bosnia and Herzegovina) Vahid Halilhodžić	2011 – 2014	30	18	5	7	60	
7	(Algeria) Abdelhamid Kermali	1989 – 1992; 2001	28	11	10	7	39.29	1 Africa Cup of Nations; 1 Afro-Asian Cup of Nations
8	(Algeria) Hamid Zouba	1969 – 2001	23					
9	(France) Christian Gourcuff	2014 – 2016	21	13	3	5	61.9	
