= List of USM Blida international footballers =

This is a list of players, past and present, who have been capped by their country in international football whilst playing for USM Blida. a further 5 nations have fielded USM Blida players in their international sides.

== Players ==
Key
†	Players participated in the African Cup of Nations
GK	Goalkeeper
DF	Defender
MF	Midfielder
FW	Forward
Bold	Still playing competitive football

=== Algerien players ===
USM Blida Algerian international footballers
Name	Position	Date of first cap	Debut against	Date of last cap	Final match against	Caps	Goals	Coach	Ref
Ahmed Guerrache	FW	November 1, 1964	Soviet Union	November 1, 1964	Soviet Union	1	0	Ibrir	
El Hadi Benturki	FW	March 9, 1969	Morocco	December 5, 1969	North Korea	4	0	Ben Tifour & Zouba / Amara	
Mustapha Sellami	FW	March 12, 1972	Guinea	March 12, 1972	Guinea	1	0	Mekhloufi	
Nasreddine Akli	FW	October 4, 1972	Turkey	August 25, 1973	Iraq	6	6	El Kenz & Sellal / Amara	
Kamel Kaci-Saïd	FW	September 4, 1994	Ethiopia	July 30, 1995	Tanzania	12	2	Madjer	
Reda Zouani	MF	October 14, 1994	Sudan	December 16, 1994	Tunisia	3	1	Madjer	
Mohamed Haniched	GK	January 12, 1997	Lebanon	December 22, 1997	Togo	4	0	Mehdaoui	
Billal Zouani	FW	December 20, 1997	Egypt	April 21, 2001	Senegal	3	0	Mehdaoui / Zouba, Kermali	
Kamel Kherkhache	FW	April 9, 2000	Cape Verde	January 28, 2002	Mali	10	2	Madjer	
Samir Galoul	DF	December 5, 2000	Romania	January 25, 2003	Uganda	3	0	Rădulescu & Djaadaoui	
Mohamed Samadi	GK	January 15, 2001	Burkina Faso	September 24, 2002	Uganda	3	0	Madjer / Zouba	
Smaïl Diss	DF	December 5, 2001	Ghana	June 4, 2006	Sudan	11	0	Madjer / Zouba / Leekens / Fergani / Cavalli	
Kamel Maouche	FW	September 24, 2002	Uganda	July 6, 2003	Chad	7	0	Zouba / Leekens	
Benhalima Rouane	FW	May 29, 2003	Burkina Faso	July 6, 2003	Chad	3	0	Leekens	
Mohamed Badache	FW	May 30, 2004	Jordan	August 17, 2004	Burkina Faso	3	0	Waseige	
Hadj Bouguèche	FW	August 17, 2004	Burkina Faso	September 5, 2004	Gabon	2	0	Waseige	
Abdelmadjid Tahraoui	FW	August 17, 2004	Burkina Faso	August 17, 2004	Burkina Faso	1	0	Waseige	
Ali Moumen	FW	June 4, 2004	Sudan	June 4, 2004	Sudan	1	0	Cavalli	

=== Foreign players ===
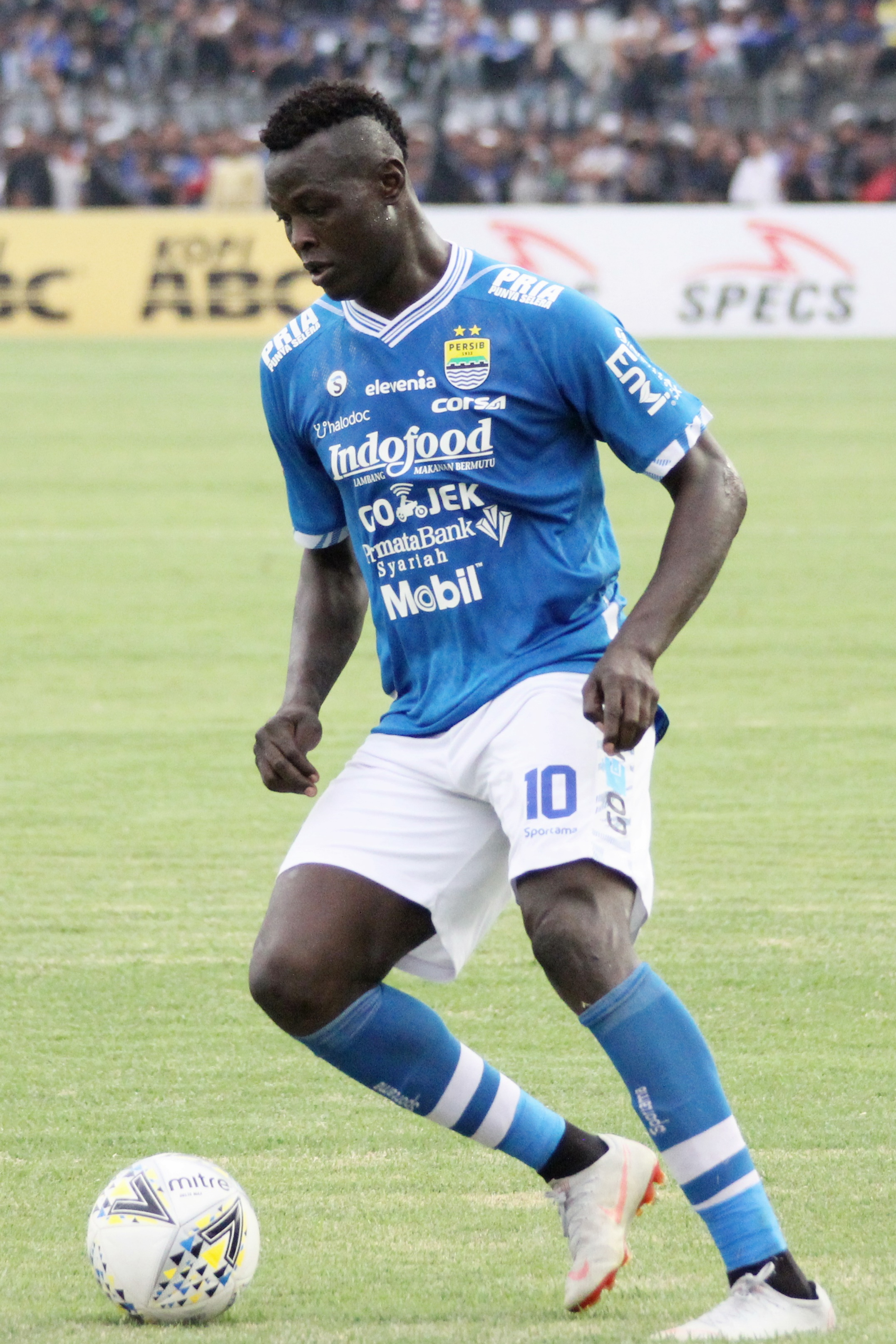
Ezechiel N'Douassel

USM Blida - Foreign international footballers
Name	Position	Date of first cap	Debut against	Date of last cap	Final match against	Caps	Goals	Ref
Moncef Kechiche	GB							
Amadou Tidiane Tall	MF	September 26, 2003	Algeria	February 2, 2004	Kenya	2	0	
Mamadou Tall	DF	February 9, 2005	Algeria	March 24, 2007	Mozambique	6	0	
Wilfried Urbain Elvis Endzanga	FW	June 1, 2008	Mali	June 22, 2008	Congo	4	1	
Ezechiel N'Douassel	FW	September 10, 2008	Sudan	September 10, 2008	Sudan	1	0	

== Players in international competitions ==
=== African Cup Players ===
(Burkina Faso) 1998 African Cup

- (Algeria) Billal Zouani

(Mali) 2002 African Cup

- (Algeria) Salah Samadi
- (Algeria) Smail Diss
- (Algeria) Kamel Kherkhache

(Tunisia) 2004 African Cup

- (Burkina Faso) Amadou Tidiane Tall
