= List of MC Alger managers =

Mouloudia Club d'Alger is a professional football club based in Algiers, Algeria, which plays in Algerian Ligue Professionnelle 1. This chronological list comprises all those who have held the position of manager of the first team of MC Alger from 1962, when the first professional manager was appointed, to the present day. Each manager's entry includes his dates of tenure and the club's overall competitive record (in terms of matches won, drawn and lost), honours won and significant achievements while under his care. Caretaker managers are included, where known. As of the start of the 2023–24 season, MC Alger have had 61 full-time managers.

== List of managers ==
Information correct as of 21 June 2025. Only competitive matches are counted.

Key
*	Caretaker manager

Name	From	To	Matches	Won	Drawn	Lost	Win%
(Algeria) Saïd Hadad	September 1962	December 1963	38	26	5	7	68.42
(Algeria) Mustapha El Kamal	December 1963	July 1965	48	22	11	15	45.83
(Algeria) Ali Benfadah	August 1965	July 1966	33	23	7	3	69.7
(France) Lucien Leduc (Note: After one match, Lucien Leduc left MC Alger to the Algeria national football team by decision of the Algerian Football Federation.)	September 1966	September 1966	1	0	0	1	0
(Algeria) Mustapha El Kamal	October 1966	May 1967	24	16	3	5	66.67
(Algeria) Omar Hahad	September 1967	June 1969	51	27	10	14	52.94
(Algeria) Smaïl Khabatou	August 1969	May 1971	48	23	15	10	47.92
(Algeria) Ali Benfadah	May 1971	June 1972	41	22	14	5	53.66
(Algeria) Smaïl Khabatou	August 1972	June 1974	72	35	17	20	48.61
(Algeria) Hamid Zouba	August 1974	June 1977	113	62	27	24	54.87
(Algeria) Kamel Lemoui	August 1977	May 1978	28	16	7	5	57.14
(Socialist Federal Republic of Yugoslavia) Velimir Naumović (Algeria) Abderrahman Ibrir	August 1978	June 1979	33	18	8	7	54.55
(Socialist Federal Republic of Yugoslavia) Velimir Naumović	July 1979	10 November 1979	5	1	2	2	20
(Algeria) Amar Boudissa	10 November 1979	June 1980	30	11	10	9	36.67
(Socialist Federal Republic of Yugoslavia) Velimir Naumović (Algeria) Abdelhamid Bacha	August 1980	November 1980	10	6	1	3	60
(Algeria) Abdelhamid Bacha	November 1980	June 1981	22	9	3	10	40.91
(Algeria) Mohamed Salem	August 1981	5 December 1981	14	3	4	7	21.43
(Algeria) Abdennour Kaoua	6 December 1981	June 1983	55	23	17	15	41.82
(Algeria) Abdelhamid Kermali	August 1983	June 1984	37	15	11	11	40.54
(Algeria) Ahmed Arab (Algeria) Abdellatif Bourayou	July 1984	28 September 1984	6	2	1	3	33.33
(Algeria) Abdellatif Bourayou	28 September 1984	June 1985	36	10	16	10	27.78
(Algeria) Kamel Lemoui (Algeria) Abdellatif Bourayou (Algeria) Abdelhamid Bacha	August 1985	June 1986	35	24	10	1	68.57
(Algeria) Abdellatif Bourayou	July 1986	June 1987	40	14	14	12	35
(Algeria) Hamid Zouba	July 1987	6 February 1988	20	7	7	6	35
(Algeria) Abdennour Kaoua (Algeria) Abdelwahab Zenir	15 February 1988	July 1988	17	6	5	6	35.29
(Algeria) Abdelhamid Kermali (Note: After the match against USM Annaba on December 14, 1989, Abdelhamid Kermali leaves MC Alger for the Algeria national football team.)	August 1988	14 December 1989	43	16	16	11	37.21
(Algeria) Abdelhamid Kermali	November 1998	July 1999	24	16	6	2	66.67
(France) Alain Michel	21 September 2008	22 November 2009	40	20	12	8	50
(France) François Bracci	29 November 2009	June 2010	26	14	9	3	53.85
(France) Alain Michel	June 2010	10 March 2011	20	6	8	6	30
(Algeria) Noureddine Zekri	11 March 2011	19 July 2011	20	7	10	3	35
(Algeria) Abdelhak Menguellati^{*}	June 2011	August 2011	4	0	2	2	0
(Algeria) Abdelhak Benchikha	4 September 2011	5 October 2011	6	2	1	3	33.33
(France) François Bracci	23 October 2011	9 February 2012	12	5	4	3	41.67
(Algeria) Kamel Bouhellal	10 February 2012	3 May 2012	10	5	2	3	50
(Algeria) Abdelkrim Bira	4 May 2012	30 June 2012	4	1	3	0	25
(France) Patrick Liewig	20 June 2012	18 August 2012	0	0	0	0	
(France) Jean-Paul Rabier	21 August 2012	22 September 2012	3	1	0	1	33.33
(Algeria) Djamel Menad	24 September 2012	9 May 2013	30	15	10	5	50
(Algeria) Farid Zemiti^{*}	10 May 2013	22 May 2013	2	1	0	1	50
(Switzerland) Alain Geiger	5 June 2013	10 November 2013	11	5	2	4	45.45
(Algeria) Fouad Bouali	18 November 2013	25 May 2014	25	12	6	7	48
(Algeria) Boualem Charef	27 May 2014	10 November 2014	9	2	3	4	22.22
(Portugal) Artur Jorge	3 January 2015	8 October 2015	24	11	7	6	45.83
(Algeria) Meziane Ighil	13 October 2015	6 February 2016	14	6	5	3	42.86
(Algeria) Lotfi Amrouche^{*}	6 February 2016	27 May 2016	15	5	7	3	33.33
(Algeria) Djamel Menad	28 May 2016	1 November 2016	9	4	2	3	44.44
(Algeria) Kamel Mouassa	2 November 2016	9 July 2017	39	19	9	11	28.21
(France) Bernard Casoni	10 August 2017	30 August 2018	50	22	12	16	44
(Algeria) Rafik Saifi^{*}	15 September 2018	23 October 2018	7	3	2	2	42.86
(Algeria) Adel Amrouche	24 October 2018	11 March 2019	17	7	6	4	41.18
(France) Bernard Casoni	4 May 2019	7 December 2019	20	9	6	5	45
(Algeria) Mohamed Mekhazni^{*}	7 December 2019	10 February 2020	8	3	2	3	37.5
(Algeria) Nabil Neghiz	11 February 2020	4 February 2021	20	10	6	4	50
(Algeria) Abdelkader Amrani	7 February 2021	12 April 2021	12	3	6	3	25
(Algeria) Nabil Neghiz	23 April 2021	12 August 2021	24	9	6	9	37.5
(Tunisia) Khaled Ben Yahia	1 September 2021	8 June 2022	34	13	12	9	38.24
(Bosnia and Herzegovina) Faruk Hadžibegić	16 July 2022	10 September 2022	3	0	2	1	0
(Tunisia) Faouzi Benzarti	25 September 2022	15 February 2023	14	6	4	4	42.86
(France) Patrice Beaumelle	3 March 2023	16 December 2024	65	36	19	10	55.38
(Tunisia) Khaled Ben Yahia	17 December 2024	21 June 2025	29	13	12	4	44.83
(South Africa) Rhulani Mokwena	21 July 2025	14 March 2026	34	20	8	6	58.82
(Tunisia) Khaled Ben Yahia	15 March 2026						

== Trophies ==
#	Name	L1	AC	SC	LC	CAF	UMF	Total
1	(Algeria) Hamid Zouba	2	1	-	-	1	-	4
1	(Tunisia) **Khaled Ben Yahia**	2	-	2	-	-	-	4
3	(France) François Bracci	1	1	1	-	-	-	3
3	(Algeria) Ali Benfadah	1	1	-	-	-	1	3
5	(Italy) Enrico Fabbro	-	1	1	-	-	-	2
5	(Algeria) Smaïl Khabatou	-	1	-	-	-	1	2
7	(Algeria) Abdelhamid Kermali	1	-	-	-	-	-	1
7	(France) Patrice Beaumelle	1	-	-	-	-	-	1
7	(Algeria) Abdennour Kaoua	-	1	-	-	-	-	1
7	(Algeria) Fouad Bouali	-	1	-	-	-	-	1
7	(Algeria) Kamel Amrouche	-	1	-	-	-	-	1
7	(Algeria) Boualem Charef	-	-	1	-	-	-	1
7	(Algeria) Abdelwahab Zenir	-	-	-	1	-	-	1
7	(Algeria) Kamel Lemoui	1	-	-	-	-	-	1
7	(Socialist Federal Republic of Yugoslavia) Velimir Naumović	1*	-	-	-	-	-	1
7	(Algeria) Abderrahman Ibrir	1*	-	-	-	-	-	1

Bold = current manager

== Managers ==
List of MC Alger managers by games
#	Manager	Period	G	W	D	L	Win %	Honours
1	(Algeria) Hamid Zouba	1974 – 1977, 1987 – 1988	133	69	34	30	54.87	2 Ligue Professionnelle 1; 1 Algerian Cup; 1 CAF Champions League
2	(Algeria) Smaïl Khabatou	1969 – 1971, 1972 – 1974	120	58	32	30	48.33	1 Algerian Cup; 1 Maghreb Cup Winners Cup
3	(Algeria) Abdelhamid Kermali	1983 – 1984, 1988 – 1989, 1998 – 1999	104	47	33	24	45.19	1 Ligue Professionnelle 1
4	(Algeria) Ali Benfadah	1965 – 1966, 1971 – 1972	74	45	21	8	60.81	1 Ligue Professionnelle 1; 1 Algerian Cup; 1 Maghreb Cup Winners Cup
5	(Algeria) Mustapha El Kamal	1963 – 1965, 1966 – 1967	72	38	14	20	52.78	
6	(Algeria) Abdennour Kaoua	1981 – 1983, 1988	72	29	22	21	40.28	1 Algerian Cup
7	(France) Bernard Casoni	2017 – 2018, 2019	70	31	18	21	44.29	
8	(France) Patrice Beaumelle	2023 – 2024	65	36	19	10	55.38	1 Ligue Professionnelle 1
9	(Tunisia) **Khaled Ben Yahia**	2021 – 2022, 2024 – 2025	63	26	24	13	41.27	2 Algerian Super Cup; 2 Ligue Professionnelle 1
10	(Algeria) Kamel Lemoui	1977 – 1978, 1985 – 1986	63	40	17	6	63.49	1 Ligue Professionnelle 1
11	(France) Alain Michel	2008 – 2009, 2010 – 2011	60	26	20	14	43.33	
12	(France) François Bracci	2006, 2009 – 2010, 2011 – 2012	57	28	20	9	49.12	1 Ligue Professionnelle 1; 1 Algerian Cup; 1 Algerian Super Cup
