= Abderrahmane Mehdaoui =

Algerian footballer and manager (1949–2022)

Personal information
- Date of birth: 7 October 1949
- Place of birth: Hussein Dey, French Algeria
- Date of death: 13 September 2022 (aged 72)
- Position: Centre-back

Youth career
- NA Hussein Dey

Senior career*
Years	Team	Apps	(Gls)
- NA Hussein Dey
- Omnisport d'Alger

Managerial career
- 1997–1998: Algeria
- 2015: WA Tlemcen
- 2016: AGS Mascara
- 2017: DRB Tadjenanet
- * Club domestic league appearances and goals

Abderrahmane Mehdaoui (7 October 1949 – 13 September 2022) was an Algerian football player and manager who managed the Algeria national team, as well as club sides WA Tlemcen, AGS Mascara and DRB Tadjenanet.

== Career ==
Born in Hussein Dey, Mehdaoui played for the youth teams of NA Hussein Dey before suffering a serious injury. After military service he returned to playing for the club, as a centre-back, later moving to Omnisport d'Alger and retiring at the age of 27.

== Death ==
Mehdaoui died on 13 September 2022, at the age of 72.
