= Rabah Saâdane =

Algerian footballer (born 1946)

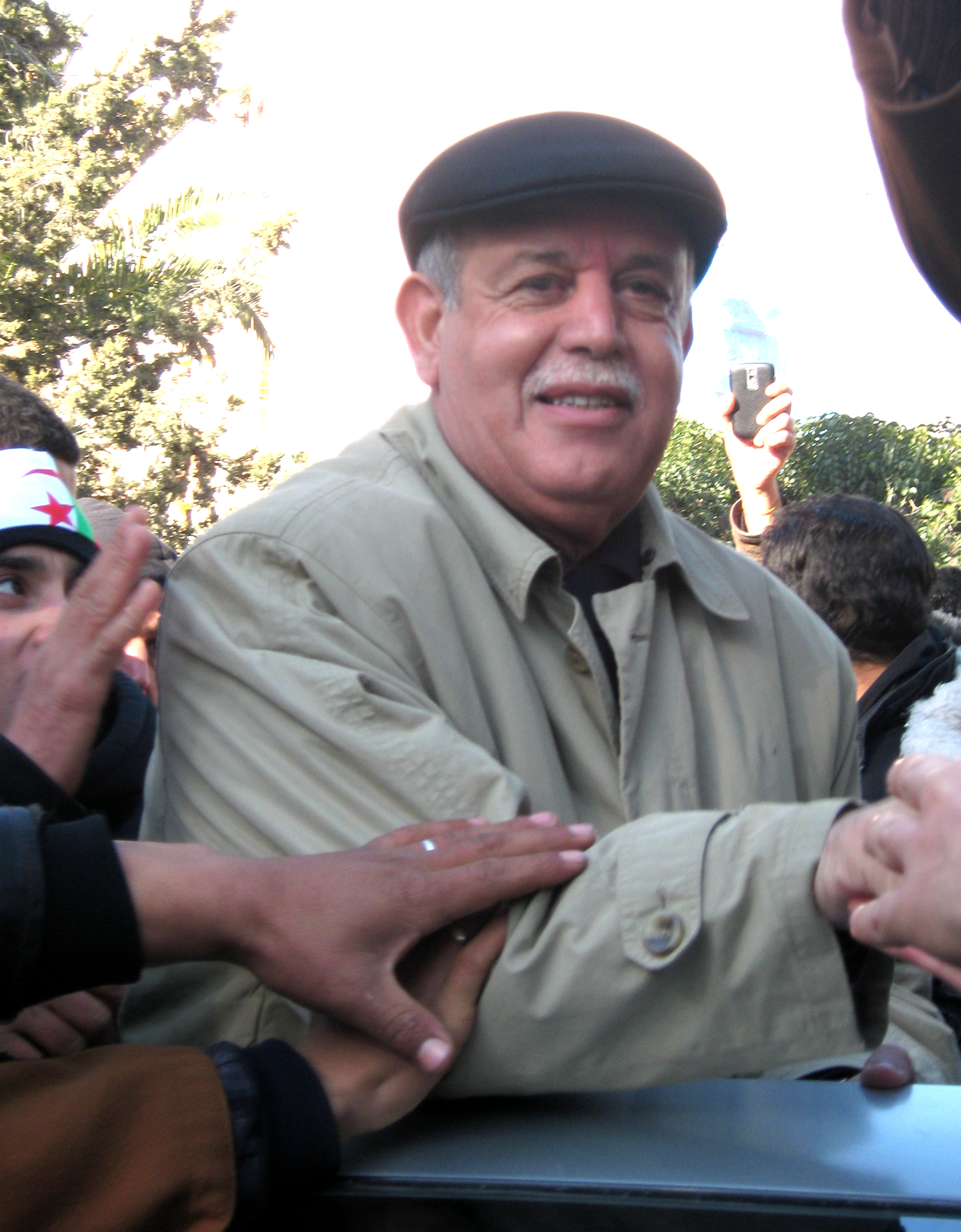
- Saâdane in 2009

Personal information
- Date of birth: 3 May 1946 (age 80)
- Place of birth: Batna, Algeria
- Height: 1.75 m (5 ft 9 in)
- Position: Defender

Senior career*
Years	Team	Apps	(Gls)
1964–1968	MSP Batna	150	(7)
1968–1969	MO Constantine	23	(0)
1969–1971	JS El Biar	45	(0)
1972–1973	USM Blida	12	(0)
Total		230	(7)

International career
1971	Algeria	1	(0)

Managerial career
- 1979–1981: Algeria U-20
- 1981–1982: Algeria
- 1985–1986: Algeria
- 1988–1989: Raja Casablanca
- 1989–1990: MC Alger
- 1991–1992: Al-Najma
- 1994–1995: ÉS Sahel
- 1999: Algeria
- 1999–2000: USM Alger
- 2002: Al Shabab
- 2003–2004: Algeria
- 2004–2005: Yemen
- 2006–2007: ES Sétif
- 2007–2010: Algeria
- * Club domestic league appearances and goals

Rabah Saâdane (Arabic: رابح سعدان; born 3 May 1946) is an Algerian football manager and retired professional player whose playing career was abruptly interrupted at the age of 27 by a car accident. His last management job was of the Algerian national team before resigning in September 2010.

It was his fifth separate spell in charge of the team after earlier stints between 1981 and 2004 and was arguably his most successful, given its arduous qualification process. He was in charge when the U-20s qualified for the 1979 FIFA World Youth Championship, Algeria's first participation in a major tournament. He was also part of the 1982 FIFA World Cup backroom staff and head coach in the 1986 FIFA World Cup.

Saâdane was designated as Africa's best coach by the Africa International Sport Convention (CISA) during its 6th edition held in Bamako, Mali. He was described by the convention as being the only coach in the world to have qualified a team to four Fifa World Cup finals, including one in the junior level.

== Playing career ==
Saâdane was born in Batna. In the mid-1960s, he was promoted to the senior team of the MSP Batna at the age of 16 when he was only a cadet at the time. He continued pursuing his education completing secondary school at the Lycée Ahmed Reda Houhou in Constantine where he had gained a certificate of baccalaureate. He then signed for MO Constantine, he continued pursuing his education in Constantine and gained a Ph.D. He signed for JS El Biar after his brief stint at MO Constantine. He later signed for USM Blida. Saâdane had played for all the youth teams for Algeria, before receiving his first call-up to the senior team by coach Rachid Mekhloufi, but he was forced to end his playing career at the age of 27 years because of an injury gained from a car accident. According to some sources, he would have played for Rennes. However, Saâdane personally confirmed he never played in France, where he attended coaching lessons given by Georges Boulogne.

== Managerial career ==
Saâdane was an assistant coach next to Abdelhamid Kermali who led the Algerian under-20 youth team in 1978, to the 1979 FIFA World Youth Championship. Which in turn was the country's first participation in a major tournament, since gaining its independence from France. He was replaced by Rachid Hanifi for the 1979 FIFA World Youth Championship, where they managed to reach the quarter-finals of the tournament with whom they eventually met Argentina with the young Diego Armando Maradona who played remarkably in the competition showing truly what an exceptional talent he was at the time.

He also coached Raja Casablanca, with whom he won the 1989 African Cup of Champions Clubs, Étoile Sportive du Sahel, the Yemen national team and ES Sétif.

On 4 September 2010, the Algerian Football Federation announced on their official website that Rabah Saâdane had resigned, a day after the team's disappointing 1–1 home draw against Tanzania in a 2012 African Cup of Nations qualifier. The Algerian Football Federation had said that Saâdane had tendered his resignation and that it had been accepted. Saâdane had ended his fifth spell with the national team having steered them to the semi-finals of the 2010 African Cup of Nations, for the first time since 1990, and the 2010 World Cup in South Africa, ending a 24-year wait.

On 1 January 2011, the general secretary of the Yemen Football Association, Hamid Chibani, announced that Saâdane had been appointed manager of Yemen until 2014. However, ten days later, it was announced that he would not become the manager because the Yemen Football Association could not meet his financial demands.
