= Abdelhamid Sellal =

Algerian footballer and manager

Managerial career
- Years: Team
- 1972–1973: Algeria

Abdelhamid Sellal is an Algerian former football player and manager who managed the national team.
