= Saïd Amara =

Algerian footballer (1933–2020)

Personal information
- Date of birth: 11 March 1933
- Place of birth: Saïda, French Algeria
- Date of death: 2 August 2020 (aged 87)
- Place of death: Saïda, Algeria
- Height: 1.69 m (5 ft 7 in)
- Position: Midfielder

Senior career*
Years	Team	Apps	(Gls)
1951–1953	GC Saida		
1953–1956	SC Bel Abbès		
1956–1957	Strasbourg	24	(3)
1957–1960	Béziers	89	(28)
1960–1964	Bordeaux	40	(9)
1964–1968	MC Saïda		
1968–1971	JSM Tiaret		
Total		151	(40)

International career
1960–1962	FLN	21	(11)
1963–1964	Algeria	5	(0)

Managerial career
- 1964–1968: MC Saïda
- 1968–1971: JSM Tiaret
- 1968–1969: Algeria
- 1973–1974: Algeria
- 1973–1974: ES Mostaganem
- 1976–1979: MC Oran
- 1983–1984: GC Mascara
- 1985–1986: MC Saïda
- 1996–1999: Al-Ahly Benghazi
- * Club domestic league appearances and goals

Saïd Amara (Arabic: سعيد عمارة; 11 March 1933 – 2 August 2020) was an Algerian football player and manager.

== Playing career ==
=== Club career ===
Born in Saïda, Amara started playing club football for Gaité Club Saida and SC Bel Abbès. In 1956, he moved to France to play for Strasbourg, Béziers and Bordeaux. He returned to Algeria, playing with MC Saïda and JSM Tiaret.

=== International career ===
He spent time with the FLN football team in 1960 to 1962, and received death threats upon his return to Bordeaux. He also earned five caps for the Algerian national team between 1963 and 1964.

== Coaching career ==
Amara had two spells as manager of the Algerian national team. He also managed many clubs, including MC Saïda, ES Mostaganem, MC Oran, GC Mascara and Al-Ahly Benghazi.
