= Mohamed El Kenz =

Algerian footballer

Managerial career
- Years: Team
- 1972–1973: Algeria

Mohamed El Kenz is an Algerian former football player and manager who managed the national team.
