= 1991 Afro-Asian Cup of Nations =

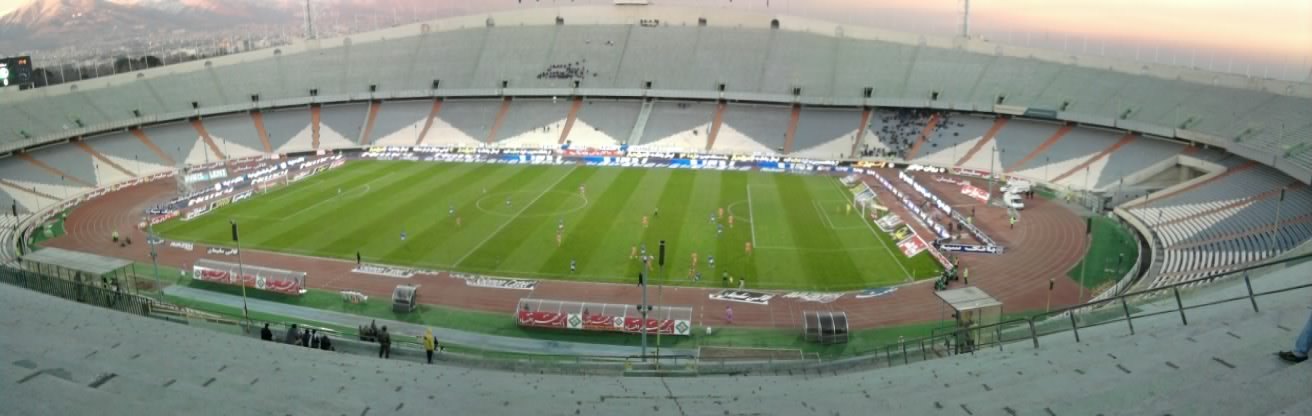
- Azadi Stadium & 5 July Stadium
Iran	Algeria
2	2
- 2–2 on aggregate; Algeria won on away goals

First leg
Iran	Algeria
2	1
- Date: 27 September 1991
- Venue: Azadi Stadium, Tehran
- Referee: Nizar Watti (Syria)
- Attendance: 100,000

Second leg
Algeria	Iran
1	0
- Date: 13 October 1991
- Venue: Stade du 5 Juillet, Algiers
- Referee: Naji Jouini (Tunisia)
- Attendance: 30,000

The 1991 Afro-Asian Cup of Nations was the fourth edition of the Afro-Asian Cup of Nations, it was contested by Algeria, winners of the 1990 African Cup of Nations, and Iran, winners of the 1990 Asian Games football tournament. Algeria won on away goal after a 2 - 2 draw on aggregate.

== Qualified teams ==
Country	Qualified as	Previous appearance in tournament
Algeria	1990 African Cup of Nations champions	Debut
Iran	1990 Asian Games champions	1 (1978)

== Match details ==
=== First leg ===
27 September 1991
--:-- UTC+3:30

Iran	2–1	Algeria
Marfavi 13', 78'	Report	23' Lazizi

Azadi Stadium, Tehran
Attendance: 100,000
Referee: Nizar Watti (Syria)

Iran	Algeria

Iran:
GK	1	Ahmadreza Abedzadeh
DF	2	Javad Zarincheh
DF	3	Mojtaba Moharrami
DF	4	Reza Hassanzadeh
DF	5	Mohammad Panjali (c)	(substituted off) 46'
MF	6	Morteza Fonounizadeh
MF	–	Majid Namjoo-Motlagh
MF	8	Hamid Derakhshan
MF	9	Mehdi Abtahi
FW	10	Samad Marfavi
FW	17	Ali Asghar Modir Roosta	(substituted off) 79'
Substitutes:
DF	–	Nader Mohammadkhani	(substituted on) 46'
FW	–	Nasser Mohammadkhani	(substituted on) 79'
Manager:
Ali Parvin

Algeria:
GK	1	Antar Osmani
DF	2	Mourad Rahmouni
DF	4	Tarek Lazizi
DF	5	Mahieddine Meftah
DF	6	Omar Belatoui
MF	8	Malik Zorgane	(substituted off) 79'
MF	9	Moussa Saïb
MF	10	Kader Ferhaoui
MF	14	Tahar Cherif El-Ouazzani
FW	11	Rabah Madjer (c)
FW	16	Liazid Sandjak	(substituted off) 86'
Substitutes:
MF	7	Abdelhafid Tasfaout	(substituted on) 79'
MF	–	Khaled Lounici	(substituted on) 86'
Manager:
Abdelhamid Kermali

Assistant referees:
... ... (...)
... ... (...)
Fourth official:
... ... (...)

Man of the Match:
Samad Marfavi (Iran)

=== Second leg ===
13 October 1991
--:-- UTC+1

Algeria	1–0	Iran
Benhalima 78'	Report

Stade du 5 Juillet, Algiers
Attendance: 30,000
Referee: Naji Jouini (Tunisia)

Algeria	Iran

Algeria:
GK	1	Antar Osmani
DF	3	Kamel Adjas
DF	4	Ali Benhalima
DF	12	Liazid Sandjak
DF	20	Fodil Megharia
MF	8	Malik Zorgane	Substituted off
MF	10	Kader Ferhaoui
MF	13	Moussa Saïb
MF	14	Tahar Cherif El-Ouazzani
FW	9	Djamel Menad
FW	11	Rabah Madjer (c)
Substitutes:
DF	5	Mahieddine Meftah
DF	6	Omar Belatoui
DF	–	Tarek Lazizi
MF	7	Abdelhafid Tasfaout
MF	–	Khaled Lounici	Substituted on
FW	–	Mohamed Rahem
Manager:
Abdelhamid Kermali

Iran:
GK	1	Ahmadreza Abedzadeh
DF	2	Javad Zarincheh
DF	3	Mojtaba Moharrami
DF	4	Reza Hassanzadeh
DF	5	Nader Mohammadkhani
MF	6	Morteza Fonounizadeh
MF	8	Hamid Derakhshan
MF	9	Mehdi Abtahi
MF	–	Majid Namjoo-Motlagh
FW	10	Samad Marfavi
FW	17	Farshad Pious
Substitutes:
DF	–	Mohammad Panjali
FW	–	Nasser Mohammadkhani
FW	–	Ali Asghar Modir Roosta
Manager:
Ali Parvin

Assistant referees:
Mohamed Salah Belagha (Tunisia)
Rachid Ben Khadija (Tunisia)
Fourth official:
Rachid Medjiba (Algeria)

Man of the Match:
... ... (Algeria)

== Winner ==
Algeria won on away goals after 2–2 on aggregate.

1991 Afro-Asian Cup of Nations

Algeria
1st title
