= Kamel Lemoui =

Algerian footballer and manager (1939–2022)

Personal information
- Date of birth: 28 February 1939
- Place of birth: Batna, French Algeria
- Date of death: 3 January 2022 (aged 82)
- Place of death: Paris, France
- Height: 1.76 m (5 ft 9 in)
- Position: Defender

Senior career*
Years	Team	Apps	(Gls)
1957–1959	RC Paris B		
1959–1962	Béziers	49	(5)
1962–1964	US Biskra		
1964–1966	MC Alger		
1966–1968	CR Belcourt		
1968–1970	Olympique de Médéa		
1970–1972	JS El Biar		

International career
1963–1968	Algeria	7	(0)

Managerial career
- 1988–1989: Algeria
- * Club domestic league appearances and goals

Kamel Lemoui (28 February 1939 – 3 January 2022) was an Algerian football player and manager.

== Playing career ==
Born in Batna, Lemoui played club football for RC Paris B, Béziers, US Biskra, MC Alger, CR Belcourt, Olympique de Médéa and JS El Biar. He also earned seven caps for the Algeria national team between 1963 and 1968.

== Coaching career ==
Lemoui managed the Algeria national team.

== Death ==
He died from COVID-19 on 3 January 2022, at the age of 82, during the COVID-19 pandemic in France.
