= Abderrahman Ibrir =

Footballer (1919–1988)

Personal information
- Date of birth: 10 November 1919
- Place of birth: Dellys, French Algeria
- Date of death: 18 February 1988 (aged 68)
- Place of death: Sidi Fredj, Algeria
- Height: 1.81 m (5 ft 11 in)
- Position: Goalkeeper

Senior career*
Years	Team	Apps	(Gls)
1946–1947	Bordeaux	19	(0)
1947–1951	Toulouse	133	(0)
1951–1953	Marseille	31	(0)
Total		183	(0)

International career
1949–1950	France	6	(0)
1959–1960	FLN		

Managerial career
- 1964–1965: Algeria
- 1978–1979: MP Alger
- * Club domestic league appearances and goals

Abderrahman Ibrir (10 November 1919 – 18 February 1988) was a professional football player and manager. Born in French Algeria, he represented both the France national team and the FLN team at international level.

== Playing career ==
Born in Dellys, Ibrir played club football in France for Bordeaux, Toulouse and Marseille. He also earned six caps for France national team the between 1949 and 1950, and later played for the FLN team between 1959 and 1960.

== Coaching career ==
Ibrir managed the Algeria national team. He was also Algerian champion with MC Alger in 1979.

== Later life and death ==
He died by drowning, off the coast of Sidi Fredj, in 1988.
