= Abdelhamid Kermali =

Algerian footballer and manager (1931-2013)

Personal information
- Date of birth: April 24, 1931
- Place of birth: Akbou, Algeria
- Date of death: April 13, 2013 (aged 81)
- Place of death: Sétif, Algeria
- Position: Striker

Senior career*
Years	Team	Apps	(Gls)
1948–1951	USM Sétif		
1951–1952	USM Alger		
1952–1953	FC Mulhouse		
1953–1955	AS Cannes		
1955–1958	Olympique Lyonnais	65	(14)
1962–1966	USM Sétif		
1966–1967	ES Sétif		

International career
1958	Algeria FLN		

Managerial career
- 1966–1967: ES Sétif
- 1983–1989: MC Alger
- 1988–1989: MC Alger
- 1989–1992: Algeria
- 1999: MC Alger
- 2003–2004: ES Sétif
Medal record
Men's football
Representing Algeria (as manager)
Africa Cup of Nations
Winner	1990
- * Club domestic league appearances and goals

Abdelhamid Kermali (April 24, 1931 – April 13, 2013) was an Algerian footballer and football manager of the Algerian national team.

Kermali was born in Akbou, Algeria. He played in several Algerian clubs as a striker, including USM Alger, before leaving for France to play for FC Mulhouse, AS Cannes and Olympique Lyonnais, with whom he made 65 Ligue 1 appearances, scoring 14 goals.

As a manager, Kermali led the Algerian national team to its first continental trophy, winning the 1990 African Cup of Nations hosted in Algeria. He also guided the team to the title of the 1991 Afro-Asian Cup of Nations.
