= Hamid Zouba =

Algerian footballer and manager (1935–2022)

Personal information
- Full name: Abdelhamid Zouba
- Date of birth: 2 April 1935
- Place of birth: Bologhine, French Algeria
- Date of death: 2 February 2022 (aged 86)

Senior career*
Years	Team	Apps	(Gls)
1951–1955	AS Saint Eugène		
1955–1958	Niort		
1960–1962	US Monastir		
1962–1963	Grenchen		
1963	Cantonal Neuchâtel		
1963–1964	Nîmes	21	(0)
1967–1969	USM Bel Abbès		

Managerial career
- 1961–1962: US Monastir (player-manager)
- 1962–1963: Grenchen (player-manager)
- 1965–1966: Cantonal Neuchâtel
- 1967–1971: USM Bel Abbès (player-manager)
- 1969–1971: Algeria
- 1972–1973: Algeria U23
- 1974–1977: MC Alger
- 1977–1978: RC Kouba
- 1978–1980: Al Akhdar SC
- 1982–1984: Algeria
- 1984–1985: US Monastir
- 1987–1988: MC Alger
- 1990–1992: MO Constantine
- 1996–1997: Algeria
- 1997: JS Kabylie
- 1997–1998: Stade Tunisien
- 2001: Algeria
- 2002–2003: Algeria
- * Club domestic league appearances and goals

Abdelhamid Zouba (2 April 1935 – 2 February 2022) was an Algerian football player and manager who managed the Algeria national team during six separate spells. He was born in Bologhine. He died on 2 February 2022, at the age of 86.

Following a playing career in French Algeria, France, Tunisia and Switzerland, he started his managerial career in Tunisia and Switzerland. He then mainly coached in Algeria, except for spells in Tunisia and Libya.
