= Algeria national football team =

Men's association football team

Algeria
- Nickname(s): الأفناك (The Fennecs) مُحَارِبِي الصَّحْرَاء (The Desert Warriors) الخُضر (The Greens)
- Association: Fédération Algérienne de Football (FAF)
- Confederation: CAF (Africa)
- Sub-confederation: UNAF (North Africa)
- Head coach: Brahim Hemdani
- Captain: Nabil Bentaleb
- Most caps: Aïssa Mandi (123)
- Top scorer: Islam Slimani (46)
- Home stadium: Nelson Mandela Stadium
- FIFA code: ALG
First colours	Second colours

FIFA ranking
- Current: 32 ▼4 (18 November 2026)
- Highest: 15 (October 2014)
- Lowest: 103 (June 2008)

First international
- Algeria 2–1 Bulgaria (Algiers, Algeria; 6 January 1963)

Biggest win
- Algeria 15–1 South Yemen (Tripoli, Libya; 17 August 1973)

Biggest defeat
- Hungary 9–2 Algeria (Budapest, Hungary; 16 August 1967)

World Cup
- Appearances: 5 (first in 1982)
- Best result: Round of 16 (2014)

Africa Cup of Nations
- Appearances: 21 (first in 1968)
- Best result: Champions (1990, 2019)

Arab Cup / FIFA Arab Cup
- Appearances: 4 (first in 1988)
- Best result: Champions (2021)
Medal record
Africa Cup of Nations
Gold medal – first place	1990 Algeria	Team
Gold medal – first place	2019 Egypt	Team
Silver medal – second place	1980 Nigeria	Team
Bronze medal – third place	1988 Morocco	Team
Bronze medal – third place	1984 Ivory Coast	Team
FIFA Arab Cup
Gold medal – first place	2021 Qatar	Team
Afro-Asian Cup of Nations
Gold medal – first place	1991 Iran and Algeria	Team
African Games
Gold medal – first place	1978 Algiers	Team
Mediterranean Games
Gold medal – first place	1975 Algiers	Team
Bronze medal – third place	1979 Split	Team
- Website: www.faf.dz

The Algeria national football team (Note: Arabic: منتخب الْجَزَائِر لِكُرَّةُ الْقَدَم; Standard Algerian Berber: ⵜⴰⵔⴱⴰⵄⵜ ⵜⴰⴷⵣⴰⵢⵔⵉⵜ ⵏ ⴷⴷⴰⴱⵅ ⵓⴹⴰⵔ) represents Algeria in men's international football, and is governed by the Algerian Football Federation. The team plays its home matches at Nelson Mandela Stadium in Algiers and Miloud Hadefi Stadium in Oran. Algeria joined FIFA in 1964, a year and a half after gaining independence.

The team has qualified for five FIFA World Cups, in 1982, 1986, 2010, 2014, and 2026, and has won the Africa Cup of Nations twice, as hosts in 1990, and again in Egypt in 2019. They were also champions of the 1975 Mediterranean Games, the 1978 All-Africa Games, the 1991 Afro-Asian Cup of Nations, and the 2021 FIFA Arab Cup.

Algeria has rivalries with Egypt, Morocco, and Tunisia, while competitive matches have been played against Nigeria, especially in the 1980s, and Mali due to sharing a common border and a long-standing competitive rivalry, and against Senegal. For the Algerians, their biggest victory on the world stage was their 2–1 win against West Germany during the 1982 FIFA World Cup, and in 2014 Algeria became the first African team to score at least four goals in a match at a World Cup, doing so against South Korea.

== History ==
=== 1957–1958: ALN ===
In 1956, in Tunis, Tunisia, the first team representing Algeria was formed, the Armée de Libération Nationale (ALN) team led by Ahmed Benelfoul and Habib Draoua. The team was approved by the FLN in May 1957 and was managed by Salah Saidou, with Abdelkader Zerrar as captain. The first game was played on 1 June 1957 against Tunisia in the Stade Chedly Zouiten. In April 1958, the team was dissolved and was replaced by the FLN team.

=== 1958–1962: FLN ===
The FLN football team was a team made up mainly of professional players in France, who then joined the Algerian independence movement of the National Liberation Front (FLN), and assisted in organizing football matches against national football teams. The FLN linked African football to anti-colonial resistance using the idea of Pan-Africanism as a legitimizing tool and symbol of national identity. The French authorities easily obtained the non-recognition of the team by FIFA.

=== 1962–1980 ===
Football in Algeria was established in the 1890s by European settlers bringing the sport to the country. The Algerian football team was established in 1962 after gaining independence from France, as the successor of the FLN football team. Under French rule, Algeria was not allowed to have a national team, the FLN football team was sort of a rebellion against the French colonization. All of their games were considered friendlies and were unrecognized by FIFA. During a press conference in Tunis, the Algerian football team refused to make any political statements, referring to football as a sport rather than a political influence. After the Algerian national football team was officially recognized by FIFA in 1963, the team qualified for the 1968 Africa Cup of Nations and failed to qualify for the next five editions of the AFCON until 1980.

=== 1980s ===
==== 1982 FIFA World Cup ====
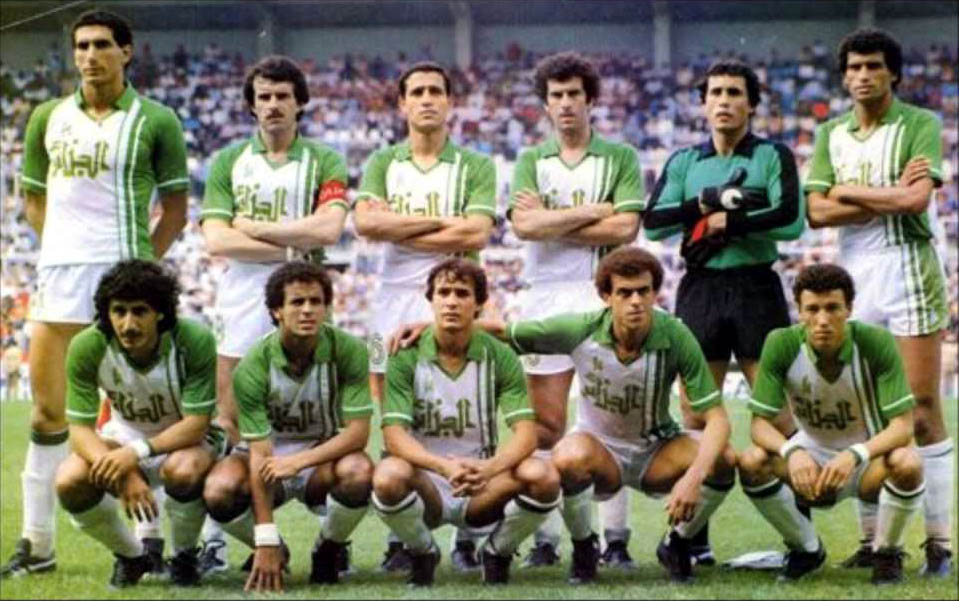
Algeria's squad against Austria during the 1982 FIFA World Cup

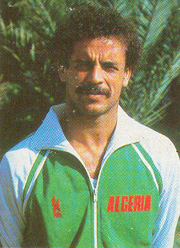
Lakhdar Belloumi

Algeria caused one of the greatest World Cup upsets on the first day of the tournament with a 2–1 victory over defending European champions West Germany.

In the final match in the group between West Germany and Austria, with Algeria and Chile having already played their final group game the day before, the European teams knew that a West German win by one or two goals would qualify them both, while a larger West German victory would qualify Algeria over Austria, and a draw or an Austrian win would eliminate the West Germans. After 10 minutes of all-out attack, West Germany scored through a goal by Horst Hrubesch, with the two teams kicking the ball around aimlessly after. Chants of "Fuera, fuera" ("Out, out") were screamed by the Spanish crowd, while angry Algerian supporters waved banknotes at the players. This performance was widely deplored, even by the West German and Austrian fans. Algeria protested to FIFA, who ruled that the result be allowed to stand; FIFA introduced a revised qualification system at subsequent World Cups in which the final two games in each group were played simultaneously.

==== 1986 FIFA World Cup ====
In 1984, Algeria finished in third place in the AFCON in Ivory Coast. During the 1986 AFCON, Algeria recorded two defeats and one draw, being eliminated in the first round. In Mexico, at the 1986 World Cup, the Algerians were unable to pass the first round once again in a group that included Northern Ireland (1–1 draw), Brazil (1–0 loss), and Spain (3–0 loss). Only one Algerian scored during this competition, Djamel Zidane. Algeria then failed to qualify for another World Cup until 2010.

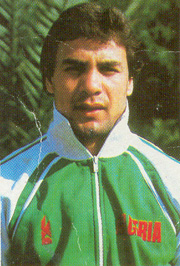
Rabah Madjer

=== 1990–2008 ===
Algeria hosted the 1990 AFCON, being drawn into Group A, with Nigeria (who they defeated 5–1), Ivory Coast (a 3–0 win), and Egypt (with Algeria winning 2–0), before reaching a final that had a crowd of 105,302 fans at Chérif Oudjani. In a rematch against Nigeria, Algeria won the AFCON for the first time.

After winning the AFCON, Algeria barely missed out in qualifying to the 1990 World Cup, and the country was on the brink of a civil war. Although Algeria qualified to the 1992 African Cup of Nations, the title holders were eliminated in the first round of the competition.

In the 1994 African Cup of Nations Algeria was disqualified from the tournament after fielding an ineligible player. Algeria returned to the 1996 African Cup of Nations, but were eliminated by hosts South Africa in the quarter-finals. Two years later, Algeria finished last in its group with three defeats and was eliminated in the group stage.

In 2000, the Fennecs passed the first round only to lose to 2–1 to eventual champions Cameroon in the quarter-finals. They then were eliminated in the first round in 2002, before losing to hosts Tunisia in the 2004 final. They then failed to qualify for either the AFCON or World Cup in 2006, and missed the 2008 Africa Cup of Nations.

=== 2008–2014 ===
==== 2010 AFCON and 2010 World Cup ====
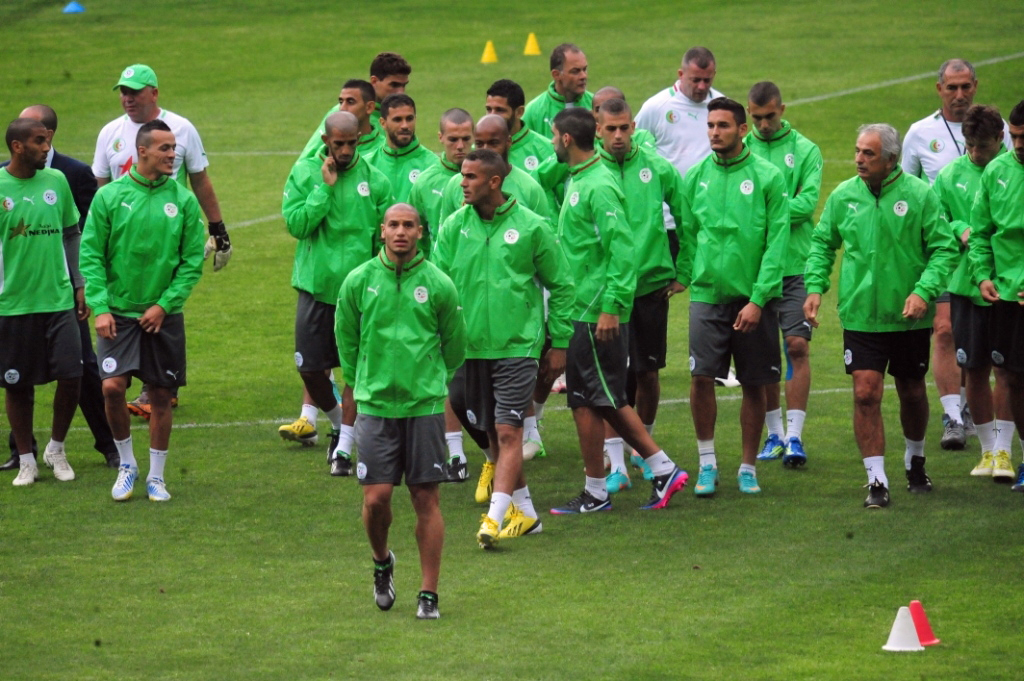
Algeria at training camp during the 2013 African Cup of Nations

On 11 October 2008, Algeria returned to the top 20 in the FIFA World Rankings by finishing first in their group ahead of Senegal, Gambia, and Liberia for the second round in the combined 2010 World Cup and 2010 African Cup of Nations qualification rounds. In the third and final round of the qualifiers, Algeria was joined by Zambia, Rwanda, and Egypt in group C.

A playoff game was played in Sudan in November 2009 with the winner qualifying for the World Cup in South Africa. Algeria won 1–0 after a stunning goal from Anthar Yahia and qualified for the finals for the third time in their history.

After qualifying for the World Cup in South Africa, Algeria finished fourth in the 2010 African Cup of Nations.

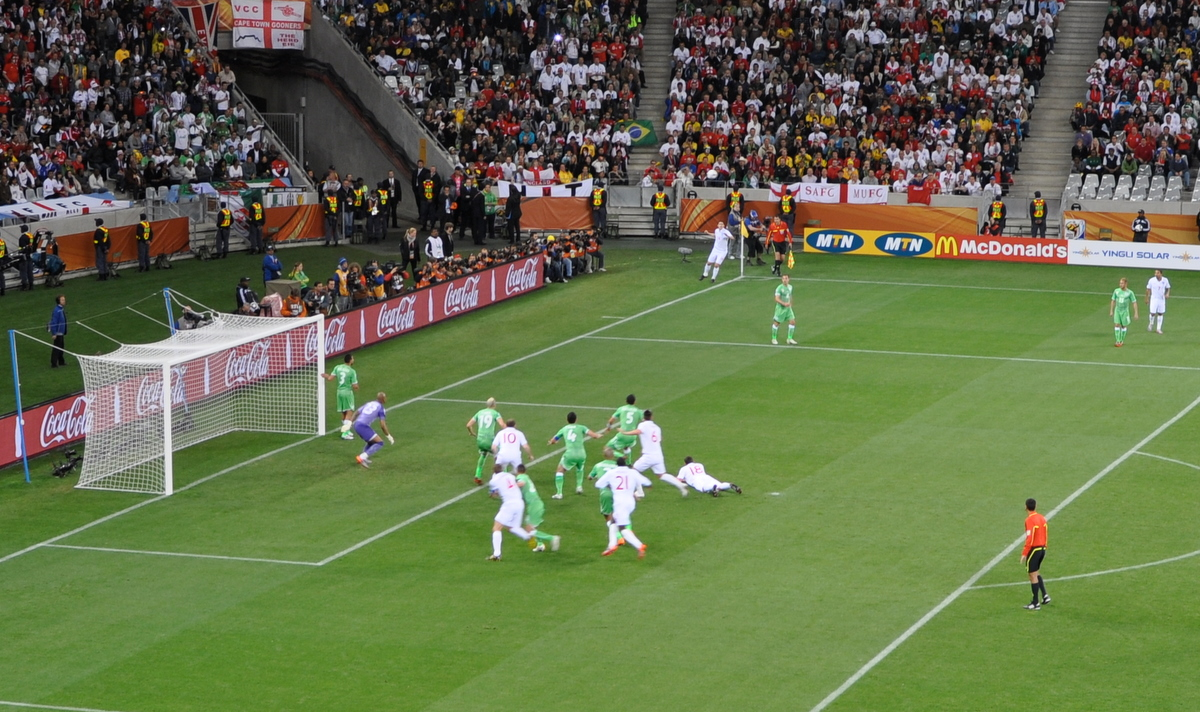
The goalless Algeria vs England match at the 2010 FIFA World Cup

Algeria was drawn in Group C with England, the United States, and Slovenia. The north African side came in the tournament in poor form, losing nearly all their World Cup preparation games in friendlies. In their first game they lost to Slovenia 0–1, with Slovenia's captain Robert Koren scoring in the 79th minute after Abdelkader Ghezzal was sent off for his second yellow card. In their second group game, Algeria drew with England leading to massive celebrations throughout the world's Algerian communities. The Fennecs lost their final group game to the United States 1–0 thanks to a Landon Donovan winner in second-half injury time. Algeria exited the championship as one of two teams, along with Honduras, to fail to score a goal.

==== 2010–13 ====
After the World Cup, Algeria suffered a 2–1 home loss to Guinea in a friendly and a 1–1 draw at home to Tanzania, leading to veteran manager Rabah Saâdane resigning and being replaced by Abdelhak Benchikha. The newly appointed coach tried to bring in new faces to the squad to bolster their offense but poor results continued for Benchikha's side who started off with a 2–0 away loss to Central African Republic. There was a little bit of hope restored for the Algerians after they beat Morocco 1–0 at home after a goal from Hassan Yebda but After they lost 4–0 to Morocco in the return leg, their manager resigned. Algeria failed to qualify for the 2012 Africa Cup of Nations and the nightmare continued.

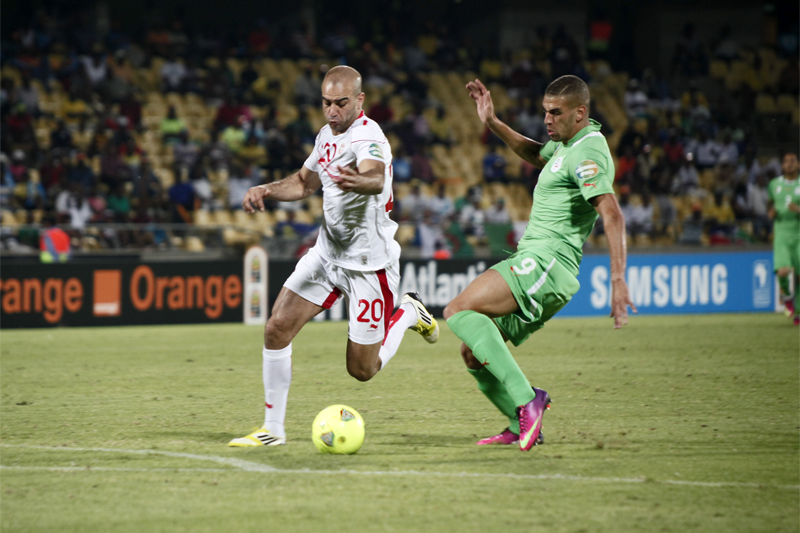
Algeria and Islam Slimani

After new coach Vahid Halilhodžić was appointed, Algeria began their 2014 World Cup qualifying campaign. The Bosnian coach's debut resulted in a 1–1 away draw against Tanzania, they then beat Central African Republic 2–0 with goals coming from Hassan Yebda and Foued Kadir. Eventually, the team qualified for the World Cup after being eliminated from the 2013 AFCON after two matches by defeating Burkina Faso on an aggregate play-off.

==== 2014 World Cup ====
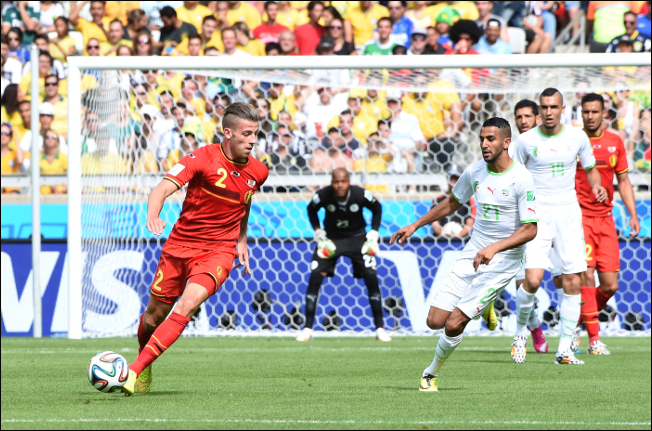
Algeria against Belgium at the 2014 FIFA World Cup

Algeria were drawn in Group H with Belgium, Russia, and South Korea. In their opening game against Belgium, Sofiane Feghouli scored Algeria's first World Cup goal in 28 years giving his team a 1–0 lead. Eventually, Belgium caught up and scored two goals to give themselves a 2–1 victory. In their second game against South Korea, Algeria won 4–2, becoming the first team to score four goals in a single match in the World Cup. On 26 June, Algeria played Russia for second place in Group H. Russia scored the opening goal but Islam Slimani equalized to carry Algeria to the second round of the World Cup for the first time, where they were eliminated in extra time by Germany.

=== 2015–2018: Decline ===
After coach Vahid decided to opt out of a contract extension following the World Cup, Lorient coach Christian Gourcuff was appointed by FAF president Mohamed Raouraoua.

==== 2015 Africa Cup of Nations ====
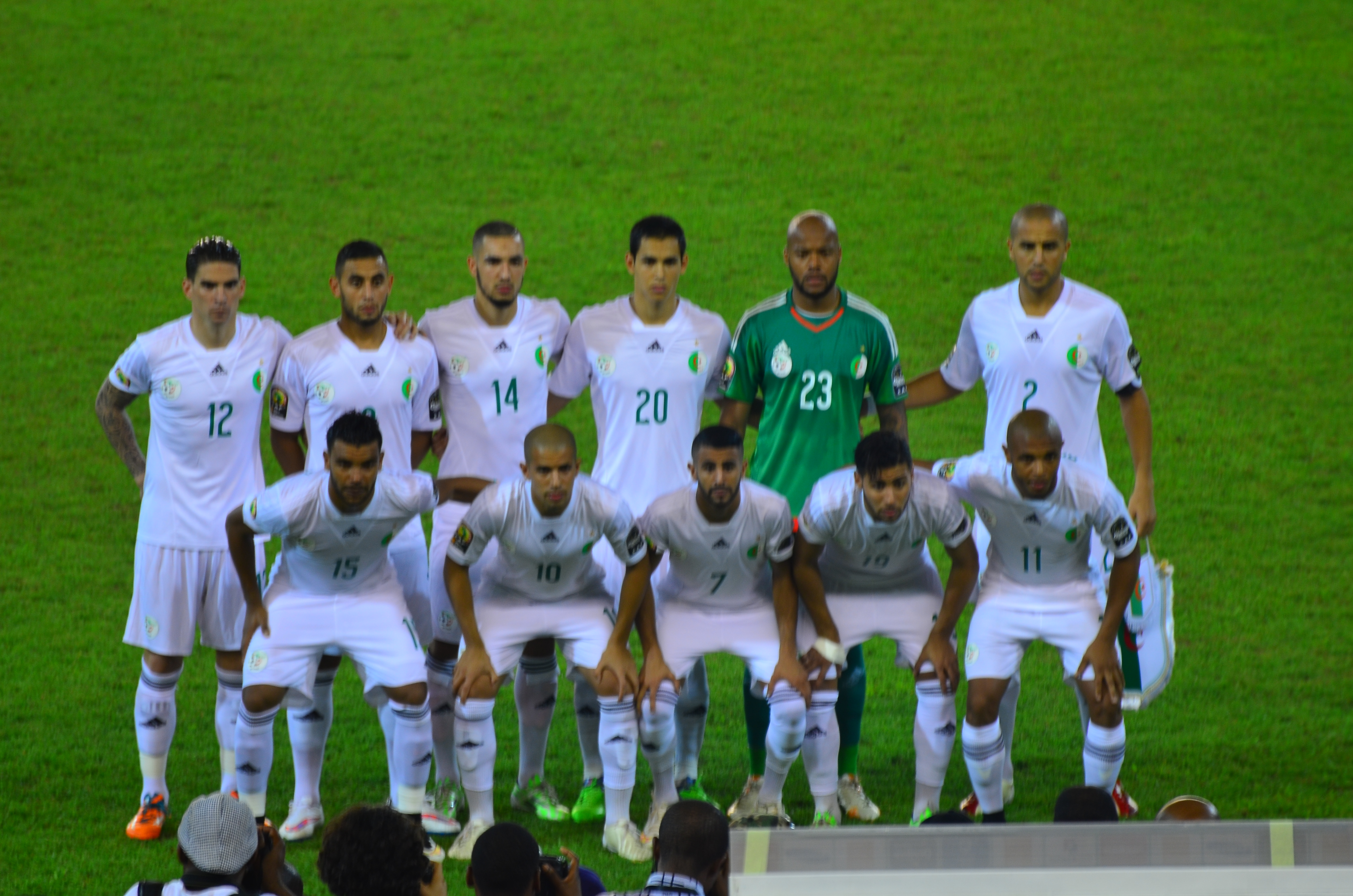
Algeria lining up during the 2015 Africa Cup of Nations

After topping their qualification group which consisted of Mali, Malawi, and Ethiopia, Algeria were drawn in a group including South Africa, Ghana, and Senegal. Playing Ghana in the last group stage match, goals from Riyad Mahrez and youngster Nabil Bentaleb sent the Foxes to the next round. The Desert Foxes finished second in their group behind Ghana despite their goal difference due to their head-to-head record. Ivory Coast awaited them, where Wilfried Bony would score twice for an eventual 2–1 win for the Elephants, eliminating the Desert Foxes from the competition.

==== 2016–2018 ====
Manager Christian Gourcuff was widely criticized after the African Cup exit and would eventually resign from his position. Milovan Rajevac was then appointed manager in June 2016, but resigned four months later after Algeria's first World Cup qualifying game ended in a home draw against Cameroon. The Algerian Football Federation then hired Georges Leekens; despite this, Algeria lost to Nigeria 3–1 during matchday 2 of the World Cup qualifiers in November 2016.

Leekens then coached Algeria during the 2017 Africa Cup of Nations, where Algeria drew against Zimbabwe and Senegal and lost against Tunisia, resulting in a group stage elimination. Algeria then failed to qualify for the 2018 FIFA World Cup in Russia.

=== 2019–present ===

Algeria starting line-up against Senegal at the 2019 Africa Cup of Nations final, where they won 1–0.

After a slew of underperforming coaches, the federation appointed former Algerian international Djamel Belmadi on 2 August 2018. Belmadi was a young coach and had mainly previously coached in Qatar. However, due to his unsuccessful tenure with the Qatar national team, when they were eliminated early in the 2015 AFC Asian Cup, skepticism arose about the manager. Algeria's performance in the 2019 AFCON qualification also suffered a setback, including a 0–1 away loss to Benin. and two 1–1 draws to Gambia, Algeria eventually topped Group C as they won all three matches including a 1–0 victory over 2018 World Cup participant Senegal. Algeria's solid performance continued with a 3–0 win over Guinea in the round of sixteen, before they overcame Ivory Coast in a hard-fought encounter which they won in a penalty shootout 4–3, after having drawn 1–1 after 120 minutes. The Algerians then went on to defeat Nigeria 2–1 with a dying minute's free kick shot by Riyad Mahrez. Facing Senegal once again in the final, Baghdad Bounedjah scored the only goal of the game as Algeria won 1–0, earning them their first title since 1990. This made Algeria the second North African side after Egypt to win multiple AFCON trophies.

Algeria competed in the 2021 FIFA Arab Cup held in Qatar. As the tournament did not occur during the international break, Belmadi was unable to coach and national team veteran and assistant coach Madjid Bougherra filled in. Algeria managed to stay undefeated through the group stages, winning 4–0 against Sudan and 2–0 against Lebanon. The last match for the top spot of Group D ended in a draw against Egypt, putting Egypt at the top of the group due to their disciplinary record. This brought them to the knockout stages where they started with a match against Morocco, with a 5–3 win for Algeria on penalties, moving them to the semi-finals against hosts, Qatar, where Algeria won after a match that lasted a record 19 minutes of stoppage time added to the first 90. The Arab Cup final against neighbours Tunisia ended regular time in a scoreless draw, with the match concluding with a goal in the fifth minute of second-half extra time and winning the team another trophy.

The 2021 Africa Cup of Nations came off to a rough start. Their first match against Sierra Leone ended in a scoreless draw. Their second match ended in their first loss since 2019 against Equatorial Guinea, losing 0–1, ending their 35-game unbeaten streak, two games away from the record held by Italy. The Algerian team suffered a defeat to Ivory Coast which led to their early exit at the group stages of the AFCON. Four years later, they would qualify for the 2026 FIFA World Cup after topping their group.

== Home stadium ==
Unlike many national teams, the Fennecs do not have a designated national stadium; the team plays in numerous venues. At the time of Algeria's independence in 1962, the team primarily played at the 20 August 1955 Stadium in Algiers and the Ahmed Zabana Stadium in Oran. Following the construction of the 5 July 1962 stadium in Algiers in 1972, it became the team's main stadium. Other stadiums have also hosted the Fennecs, including Mohamed Hamlaoui Stadium in Constantine, 19 May 1956 Stadium in Annaba, Akid Lotfi Stadium in Tlemcen, and Mustapha Tchaker Stadium in Blida.

Since 2022, the national team has mainly played in newly opened stadiums, such as Miloud Hadefi Stadium in Bir El Djir, Oran, Nelson Mandela Stadium in Baraki, Algiers and the Hocine Aït Ahmed Stadium in Tizi Ouzou.

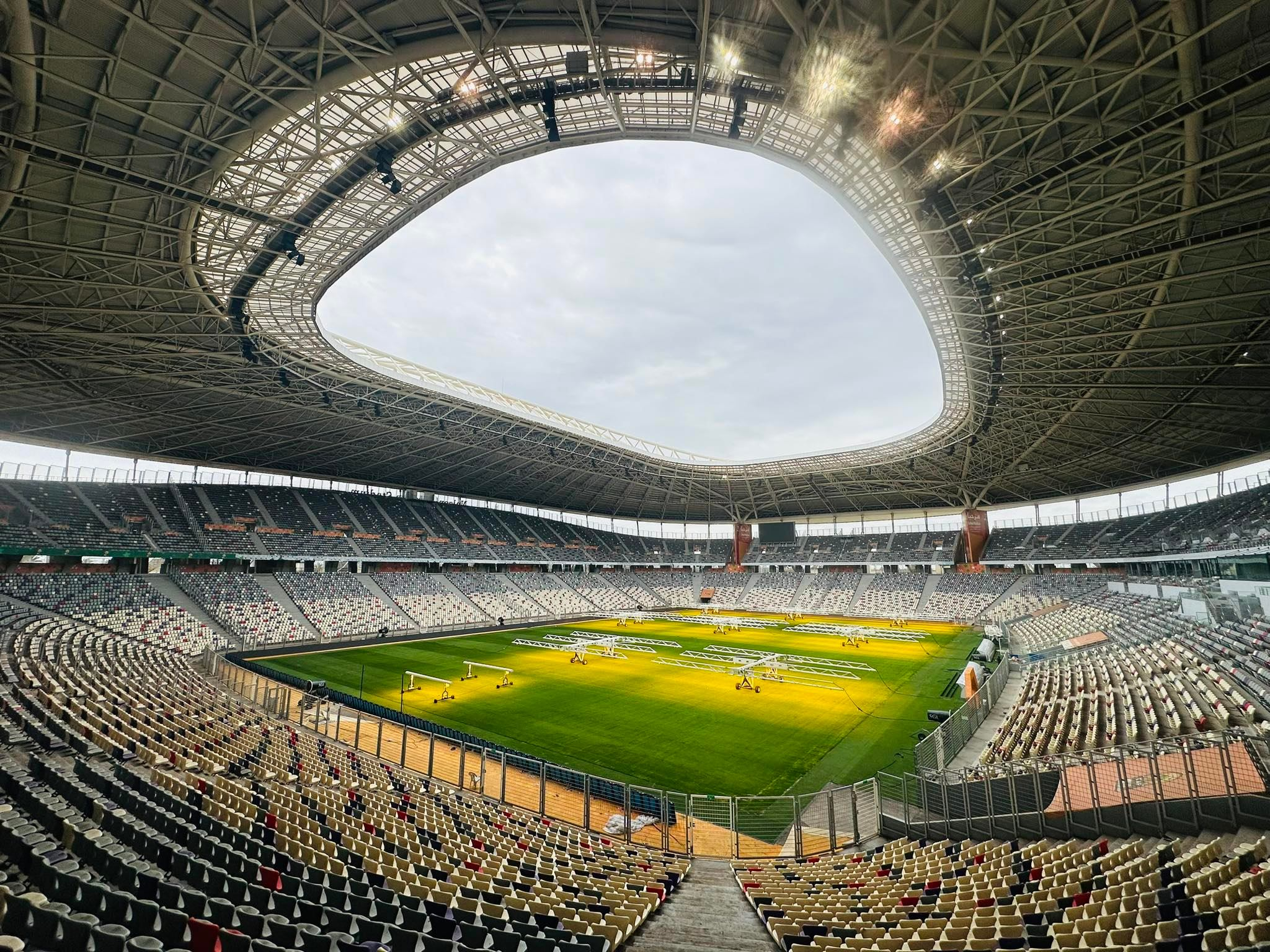
Nelson Mandela Stadium, Algiers

5 July Stadium, Algiers

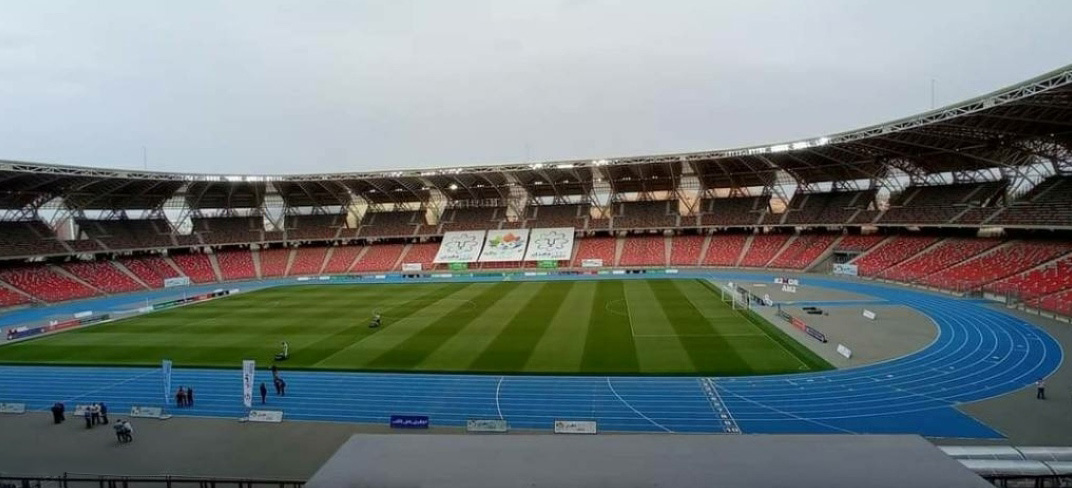
Miloud Hadefi Stadium, Oran

== Team image ==
The Algeria national team home kit is all white with a green trim, and the away kit is all green with a white trim.

=== Kit sponsorship ===
Supplier	Period
None	1962–1970
(Algeria) Delta	1971–1975
(West Germany) Adidas	1975–1976
(Algeria) Sonitex	1976–1977
(Germany) Adidas	1977
(Algeria) Sonitex	1978–1982
(Germany) Adidas	1983–1984
(Algeria) Sonitex	1985–1990
(Germany) Adidas	1991–1992
(Italy) Lotto	1993–1994
(Spain) Luanvi	1994–1995
(Algeria) Delta Sport	1996
(Italy) Kappa	1997
(Algeria) Cirta Sport	1997–1998
(Italy) Kappa	1999
(Algeria) Cirta Sport	2000
(Germany) Puma	2001
(Algeria) Cirta Sport	2001–2002
(France) Le Coq Sportif	2003–2009
(Germany) Puma	2010–2014
(Germany) Adidas	2015–present

== Results and fixtures ==
The following is a list of match results in the last 12 months, as well as any future matches that have been scheduled.

Win Draw Loss Fixture

=== 2025 ===
13 November Friendly	Algeria	3–1	Zimbabwe	Jeddah, Saudi Arabia
19:30 UTC+3	Bounedjah 14'; Amoura 41'; Hadjam 45+1'	Report	Chirewa 88' (pen.)	Stadium: Prince Abdullah Al-Faisal Sports City Stadium; Referee: Abdullah Dhafer Al Shehri (Saudi Arabia)

18 November Friendly	Saudi Arabia	0–2	Algeria	Jeddah, Saudi Arabia
19:30 UTC+3		Report	Mahrez 75' (pen.); Belghali 85'	Stadium: Prince Abdullah Al-Faisal Sports City Stadium; Referee: Abdulhadi Al-Ruwaili (Qatar)

3 December 2025 Arab Cup group stage	Algeria	0–0	Sudan	Al Rayyan, Qatar
15:00 UTC+3		Report		Stadium: Ahmad bin Ali Stadium; Attendance: 37,143; Referee: Amin Omar (Egypt)

6 December 2025 Arab Cup group stage	Bahrain	1–5	Algeria	Al Rayyan, Qatar
16:30 UTC+3	Abduljabbar 27'	Report	Berkane 24', 48'; Boulbina 30', 80'; Benzia 45+7' (pen.)	Stadium: Khalifa International Stadium; Attendance: 20,260; Referee: Campbell-Kirk Kawana-Waugh (New Zealand)

9 December 2025 Arab Cup group stage	Algeria	2–0	Iraq	Al Rayyan, Qatar
20:00 UTC+3	Tougai 45+1'; Natiq 46' (o.g.)	Report	H. Ali (red card) 5'	Stadium: Khalifa International Stadium; Attendance: 34,148; Referee: Abdulrahman Al-Jassim (Qatar)

12 December 2025 Arab Cup quarter-finals	Algeria	1–1 (a.e.t.) (6–7 p)	United Arab Emirates	Al Khor, Qatar
20:30 UTC+3	Boulbina 46'	Report	Bruno 64'	Stadium: Al Bayt Stadium; Attendance: 50,424; Referee: Adham Makhadmeh (Jordan)
	Penalties
	Brahimi (penalty scored); Benzia (penalty missed); Mrezigue (penalty scored); Ounas (penalty scored); Boulbina (penalty scored); Halaïmia (penalty scored); Draoui (penalty scored); Khacef (penalty missed)		(penalty scored) Lucas; (penalty missed) Meloni; (penalty scored) Saleh; (penalty scored) Pimenta; (penalty scored) Faiz; (penalty scored) Adil; (penalty scored) Autonne; (penalty scored) Akonnor

24 December 2025 Africa Cup of Nations group stage	Algeria	3–0	Sudan	Rabat, Morocco
16:00 UTC+1	Mahrez 2', 61'; Maza 85'	Report	Adil (yellow card) 14' (yellow-red card) 39'	Stadium: Moulay Hassan Stadium; Referee: Pierre Atcho (Gabon)

28 December 2025 Africa Cup of Nations group stage	Algeria	1–0	Burkina Faso	Rabat, Morocco
18:30 UTC+1	Mahrez 23' (pen.)	Report		Stadium: Moulay Hassan Stadium; Referee: Daniel Nii Laryea (Ghana)

31 December 2025 Africa Cup of Nations group stage	Equatorial Guinea	1–3	Algeria	Rabat, Morocco
17:00 UTC+1	Nsue 50'	Report	Belaïd 19'; Chaïbi 25'; Maza 32'	Stadium: Moulay Hassan Stadium; Referee: Pacifique Ndabihawenimana (Burundi)

=== 2026 ===
6 January 2025 Africa Cup of Nations round of 16	Algeria	1–0 (a.e.t.)	DR Congo	Rabat, Morocco
17:00 UTC+1	Boulbina 119'	Report		Stadium: Moulay Hassan Stadium; Attendance: 18,837; Referee: Mohamed Maarouf (Egypt)

10 January 2025 Africa Cup of Nations quarter-finals	Algeria	0–2	Nigeria	Marrakesh, Morocco
17:00 UTC+1		Report	Osimhen 47'; Adams 57'	Stadium: Marrakesh Stadium; Attendance: 32,452; Referee: Issa Sy (Senegal)

27 March Friendly	Algeria	7–0	Guatemala	Genoa, Italy
20:45 UTC+2	Gouiri 19', 60'; Mahrez 31' (pen.); Abada 45+1'; Aouar 47'; Ghedjemis 76'; Benbouali 82'	Report		Stadium: Stadio Luigi Ferraris; Referee: Andrea Colombo (Italy)

31 March Friendly	Algeria	0–0	Uruguay	Turin, Italy
20:45 UTC+2		Report		Stadium: Juventus Stadium; Attendance: 11,000; Referee: Luca Pairetto (Italy)

3 June Friendly	Netherlands	0–1	Algeria	Rotterdam, Netherlands
20:45 UTC+2		Report	Hadj Moussa 86'	Stadium: De Kuip; Attendance: 40,306; Referee: Jakob Semler (Austria)

10 June Friendly	Algeria	4–0	Bolivia	Lawrence, Kansas, United States
19:00 UTC−5	Mandi 45'; Gouiri 56', 58'; Hadj Moussa 61'	Report		Stadium: Rock Chalk Park; Attendance: ~150; Referee: Tori Penso (United States)

16 June 2026 FIFA World Cup Group J	Argentina	3–0	Algeria	Kansas City, Missouri, United States
20:00 UTC−5	Messi 17', 60', 76'	Report		Stadium: Arrowhead Stadium; Attendance: 69,045; Referee: Szymon Marciniak (Poland)

22 June 2026 FIFA World Cup Group J	Jordan	1–2	Algeria	Santa Clara, California, United States
20:00 UTC−7	Al-Rashdan 36'	Report	Benbouali 69'; Gouiri 82'	Stadium: Levi's Stadium; Attendance: 68,371; Referee: Slavko Vinčić (Slovenia)

27 June 2026 FIFA World Cup Group J	Algeria	3–3	Austria	Kansas City, Missouri, United States
21:00 UTC−5	Belghali 45'; Mahrez 60', 90+3'	Report	Arnautovic 28'; Sabitzer 55'; Kalajdzic 90+6'	Stadium: Arrowhead Stadium; Attendance: 69,045; Referee: Ilgiz Tantashev (Uzbekistan)

2 July 2026 FIFA World Cup Round of 32	Switzerland	2–0	Algeria	Vancouver, British Columbia, Canada
20:00 UTC−7	Embolo 10'; Ndoye 46'	Report		Stadium: BC Place; Attendance: 52,497; Referee: Yael Falcón (Argentina)

25 September 2027 Africa Cup of Nations qualification Group I	Algeria	3–1	Zambia	Tizi Ouzou, Algeria
20:00 UTC+1	Hadjam 2'; Maza 67'; Hadj Moussa 74'		Sakala 57'	Stadium: Hocine Aït Ahmed Stadium; Referee: Yannick Malala (DR Congo)

29 September 2027 Africa Cup of Nations qualification Group I	Burundi	2–2	Algeria	Bujumbura, Burundi
14:00 UTC+2	Chaïbi 5' (o.g.); Girumugisha 12'	Report	Belloumi 30'; Boulbina 63'	Stadium: Intwari Stadium; Attendance: 22,000; Referee: Thabang Ketshabile (Botswana)

6 October Friendly	Algeria	2–1	Niger	Tizi Ouzou, Algeria
18:00 UTC+1	Belloumi 53'; Bensebaini 72' (pen.)	Report	N'Dri 12'	Stadium: Hocine Aït Ahmed Stadium; Referee: Mahmoud Bassiouni (Egypt)

14 November 2027 Africa Cup of Nations qualification Group I	Algeria	1–0	Togo	Tizi Ouzou, Algeria
20:00 UTC+1	Bensebaini 76'	Report		Stadium: Hocine Aït Ahmed Stadium; Referee: Pierre Ghislain Atcho (Gabon)

17 November 2027 Africa Cup of Nations qualification Group I	Togo	3–0	Algeria	Lomé, Togo
16:00 UTC+0	Klidjé 18', 32'; Boateng 38'	Report		Stadium: Kégué Stadium; Referee: Jean-Pierre Nguiene (Congo)

=== 2027 ===
24 March 2027 Africa Cup of Nations qualification Group I	Zambia	v	Algeria	Lusaka, Zambia
TBD				Stadium: TBD

28 March 2027 Africa Cup of Nations qualification Group I	Algeria	v	Burundi	TBD, Algeria
TBD				Stadium: TBD

== Coaching staff ==
Position	Name
Head coach	(Algeria) Brahim Hemdani
Assistant Coaches	(Algeria) Antar Yahia
Goalkeeping Coach	(Algeria) Nasreddine Berarma
Fitness Coach	(Algeria) Nasser Dainiche
Physiotherapist	(Algeria) Rémi Lancou
Sports Massager(s)	(Algeria) Akram Chadli (Algeria) Brahim Tenkhi
Video Analyst	(Algeria) Zoheir Bensedira
Team Doctor	(Algeria) Mohamed Boughlali

== Players ==
=== Current squad ===
The following 26 players were called up for the 2027 Africa Cup of Nations qualification matches against Togo.

Information correct as of 14 November 2026, after the match against Togo.

No.	Pos.	Player	Date of birth (age)	Caps	Goals	Club
1	GK	Melvin Mastil	19 February 2000 (age 26)	5	0	(Swiss Football Association) Lausanne-Sport
16	GK	Oussama Benbot	11 October 1994 (age 32)	4	0	(Algerian Football Federation) USM Alger
23	GK	Rayane Yesli	12 October 1999 (age 27)	0	0	(Algerian Football Federation) Olympique Akbou
21	DF	Ramy Bensebaini (captain)	16 April 1995 (age 31)	90	11	(German Football Association) Borussia Dortmund
5	DF	Zineddine Belaïd (third captain)	20 March 1999 (age 27)	21	1	(Saudi Arabian Football Federation) Al-Taawoun
	DF	Rafik Belghali	7 June 2002 (age 24)	17	2	(Italian Football Federation) Torino
4	DF	Ahmed Touba	13 March 1998 (age 28)	18	1	(French Football Federation) Le Havre
3	DF	Achref Abada	15 June 1999 (age 27)	14	1	(Algerian Football Federation) USM Alger
25	DF	Sohaib Naïr	23 April 2002 (age 24)	1	0	(French Football Federation) Saint-Étienne
2	DF	Mohamed Azzi	11 May 2002 (age 24)	1	0	(Russian Football Union) CSKA Moscow
17	DF	Saâdi Radouani	18 March 1995 (age 31)	6	0	(Algerian Football Federation) USM Alger
20	DF	Fahem Benaïssa-Yahia	29 April 2002 (age 24)	0	0	(Italian Football Federation) Mantova
19	MF	Nabil Bentaleb(vice captain)	24 November 1994 (age 31)	65	6	(French Football Federation) Lille
8	MF	Farès Chaïbi	28 November 2002 (age 23)	39	3	(German Football Association) Eintracht Frankfurt
6	MF	Adem Zorgane	6 January 2000 (age 26)	25	1	(Royal Belgian Football Association) Union Saint-Gilloise
10	MF	Ibrahim Maza	24 November 2005 (age 20)	25	3	(German Football Association) Bayer Leverkusen
13	MF	Himad Abdelli	17 November 1999 (age 27)	12	0	(French Football Federation) Marseille
24	MF	Yacine Titraoui	26 July 2003 (age 23)	5	0	(French Football Federation) Lens
15	MF	Abde Rebbach	11 August 1998 (age 28)	0	0	(Royal Spanish Football Federation) Alavés
11	FW	Mohamed Amoura	9 May 2000 (age 26)	52	19	(French Football Federation) Nice
9	FW	Amine Gouiri	16 February 2000 (age 26)	29	11	(French Football Federation) Marseille
7	FW	Anis Hadj Moussa	11 February 2002 (age 24)	20	3	(Royal Dutch Football Association) Feyenoord
18	FW	Adil Boulbina	2 May 2003 (age 23)	17	6	(Saudi Arabian Football Federation) Al-Diriyah
22	FW	Monsef Bakrar	13 January 2001 (age 25)	9	0	(Egyptian Football Association) Al Ahly
12	FW	Amin Chiakha	12 March 2006 (age 20)	6	0	(Norwegian Football Federation) Rosenborg
26	FW	Farès Ghedjemis	6 September 2002 (age 24)	3	1	(Italian Football Federation) Frosinone

=== Recent call-ups ===
The following players have been called up to the national team in the past 12 months but are not part of the current squad.

Pos.	Player	Date of birth (age)	Caps	Goals	Club	Latest call-up
GK	Abdelatif Ramdane^{WD}	12 January 2001 (age 25)	1	0	(Algeria) MC Alger	v. Togo, 14 November 2026
GK	Luca Zidane	13 May 1998 (age 28)	10	0	(Spain) Leganés	2026 FIFA World Cup
GK	Anthony Mandrea	25 December 1996 (age 29)	22	0	(France) Caen	v. Uruguay, 31 March 2026
GK	Farid Chaâl	3 July 1994 (age 32)	4	0	(Algeria) CR Belouizdad	2025 FIFA Arab Cup
GK	Mohamed Idir Hadid	26 April 2002 (age 24)	0	0	(Algeria) USM Alger	2025 FIFA Arab Cup
DF	Jaouen Hadjam ^{INJ}	26 March 2003 (age 23)	24	4	(England) Brighton & Hove Albion	v. Togo, 14 November 2026
DF	Samir Chergui	6 February 1999 (age 27)	7	0	(France) Paris FC	v. Niger, 6 October 2026
DF	Rayan Aït-Nouri	6 June 2001 (age 25)	34	0	(England) Manchester City	v. Zambia, 6 October 2026
DF	Aïssa Mandi ^{RET}	22 October 1991 (age 35)	123	8	(Spain) Levante	2026 FIFA World Cup
DF	Mohamed Amine Tougai	22 January 2000 (age 26)	30	2	(Libya) Al-Ahli	2026 FIFA World Cup
DF	Mehdi Dorval	9 February 2001 (age 25)	4	0	(Italy) Catanzaro	v. Uruguay, 31 March 2026
DF	Youcef Atal	17 May 1996 (age 30)	55	2	Unattached	2025 Africa Cup of Nations
DF	Abdelkader Bedrane	2 April 1992 (age 34)	24	0	(Saudi Arabia) Damac	2025 FIFA Arab Cup
DF	Réda Halaïmia	28 August 1996 (age 30)	11	0	(Algeria) MC Alger	2025 FIFA Arab Cup
DF	Naoufel Khacef	27 October 1997 (age 29)	10	0	(Libya) Al-Ahli	2025 FIFA Arab Cup
DF	Houari Baouche	24 December 1995 (age 30)	8	0	(Algeria) MC Oran	2025 FIFA Arab Cup
DF	Reda Benchaa	12 March 2002 (age 24)	0	0	(Algeria) JS Kabylie	2025 FIFA Arab Cup
DF	Ayoub Ghezala	6 December 1995 (age 30)	10	1	(Algeria) MC Alger	2025 FIFA Arab Cup
MF	Hicham Boudaoui ^{INJ}	23 September 1999 (age 27)	37	0	(France) Nice	v. Togo, 14 November 2026
MF	Adil Aouchiche	15 July 2002 (age 24)	3	0	(Germany) Schalke 04	v. Niger, 6 October 2026
MF	Adil Bourabaa	9 March 2005 (age 21)	1	0	(France) Le Mans	v. Niger, 6 October 2026
MF	Ramiz Zerrouki	26 May 1998 (age 28)	56	3	(Netherlands) Twente	2026 FIFA World Cup
MF	Houssem Aouar	30 June 1998 (age 28)	25	6	(Saudi Arabia) Al-Ittihad	2026 FIFA World Cup
MF	Ismaël Bennacer	1 December 1997 (age 28)	57	3	(Qatar) Al-Gharafa	2025 Africa Cup of Nations
MF	Sofiane Bendebka	9 August 1992 (age 34)	18	1	(Saudi Arabia) Al-Hazem	2025 FIFA Arab Cup
MF	Zakaria Draoui	20 February 1994 (age 32)	21	0	(Algeria) USM Alger	2025 FIFA Arab Cup
MF	Yassine Benzia	8 September 1994 (age 32)	20	6	Unattached	2025 FIFA Arab Cup
MF	Houssem Mrezigue	23 March 2000 (age 26)	12	0	(Russia) Dynamo Makhachkala	2025 FIFA Arab Cup
MF	Victor Lekhal	27 February 1994 (age 32)	5	0	(Saudi Arabia) Al-Riyadh	2025 FIFA Arab Cup
FW	Mohamed Belloumi ^{INJ}	1 June 2001 (age 25)	3	2	(England) Hull City	v. Togo, 14 November 2026
FW	Ilan Kebbal	10 July 1998 (age 28)	6	0	(France) Paris FC	v. Niger, 6 October 2026
FW	Riyad Mahrez ^{RET}	21 February 1991 (age 35)	120	40	(Qatar) Al-Shamal	2026 FIFA World Cup
FW	Nadhir Benbouali	17 April 2000 (age 26)	5	2	(Egypt) Pyramids	2026 FIFA World Cup
FW	Baghdad Bounedjah	24 November 1991 (age 34)	86	35	(Qatar) Al-Shamal	2025 Africa Cup of Nations
FW	Redouane Berkane	7 July 2003 (age 23)	6	2	(Qatar) Al-Wakrah	2025 Africa Cup of Nations
FW	Islam Slimani	18 June 1988 (age 38)	105	46	Unattached	2025 FIFA Arab Cup
FW	Yacine Brahimi	8 February 1990 (age 36)	72	15	(Qatar) Al-Gharafa	2025 FIFA Arab Cup
FW	Adam Ounas	11 November 1996 (age 30)	31	5	(Qatar) Al-Gharafa	2025 FIFA Arab Cup
FW	Amir Sayoud	30 September 1990 (age 36)	5	1	(Saudi Arabia) Al-Hazem	2025 FIFA Arab Cup
FW	Rafik Guitane	26 May 1999 (age 27)	2	0	(Portugal) Estoril Praia	2025 FIFA Arab Cup
Notes: ^{INJ} = Player withdrew from the squad due to an injury.; ^{PRE} = Preliminary squad / standby; ^{RET} = Retired from international football.; ^{WD} = Player withdrew from the roster for non-injury related reasons.; ^{COV} = Player withdrew from the roster due to COVID-19.

== Individual records ==
As of 2 July 2026
Players in bold are still active with Algeria.

=== Most appearances ===
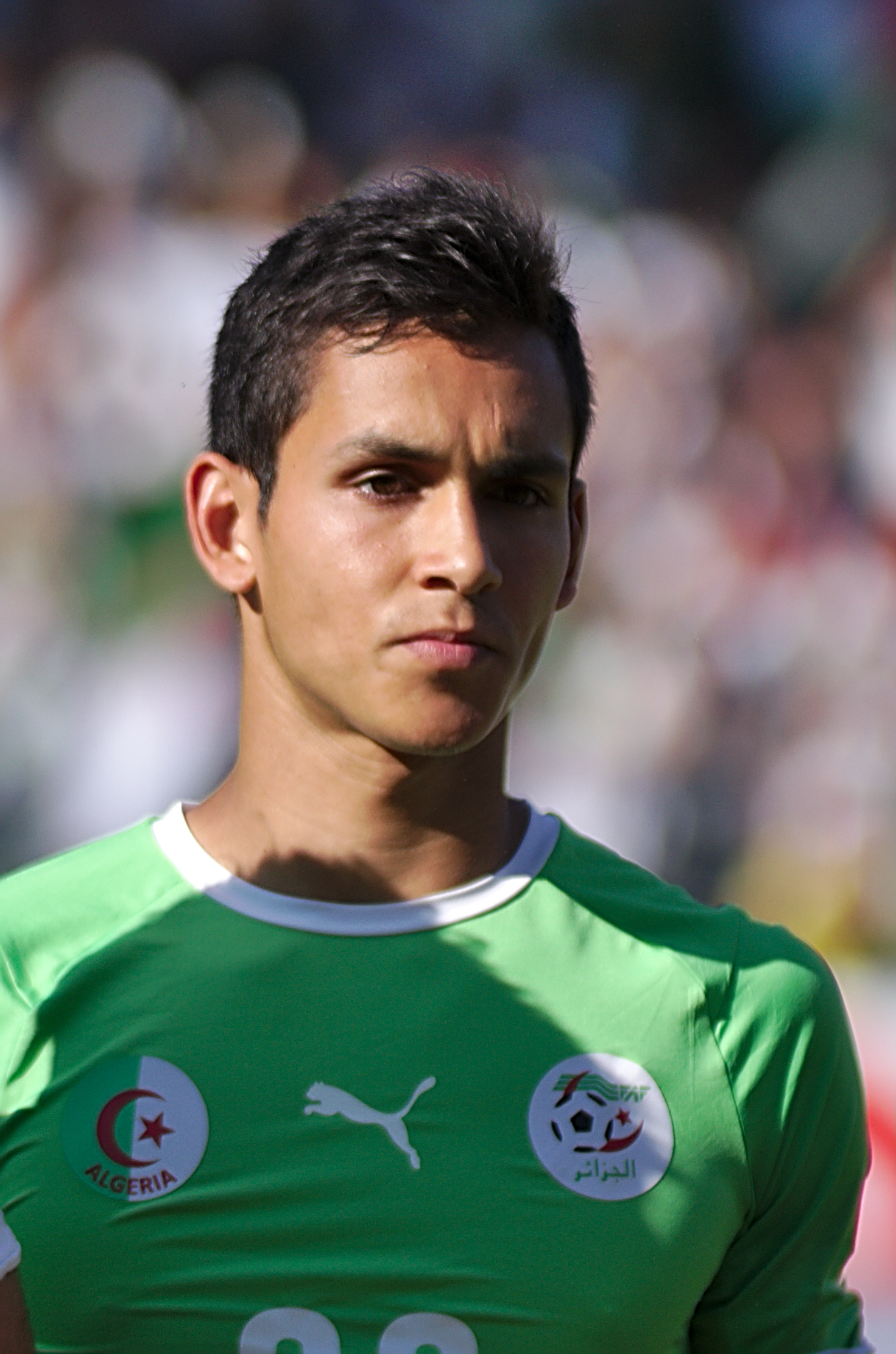
Aïssa Mandi is Algeria's most capped player with 123 appearances.

Rank	Name	Caps	Goals	Career
1	Aïssa Mandi	123	8	2014–2026
2	Riyad Mahrez	120	40	2014–2026
3	Islam Slimani	105	46	2012–2025
4	Lakhdar Belloumi	100	28	1978–1989
5	Raïs M'Bolhi	96	0	2010–2024
6	**Ramy Bensebaini**	89	10	2017–present
7	**Baghdad Bounedjah**	86	35	2013–present
7	Rabah Madjer	86	28	1978–1992
8	Sofiane Feghouli	83	19	2012–2024
9	Billel Dziri	81	9	1992–2005

=== Top goalscorers ===
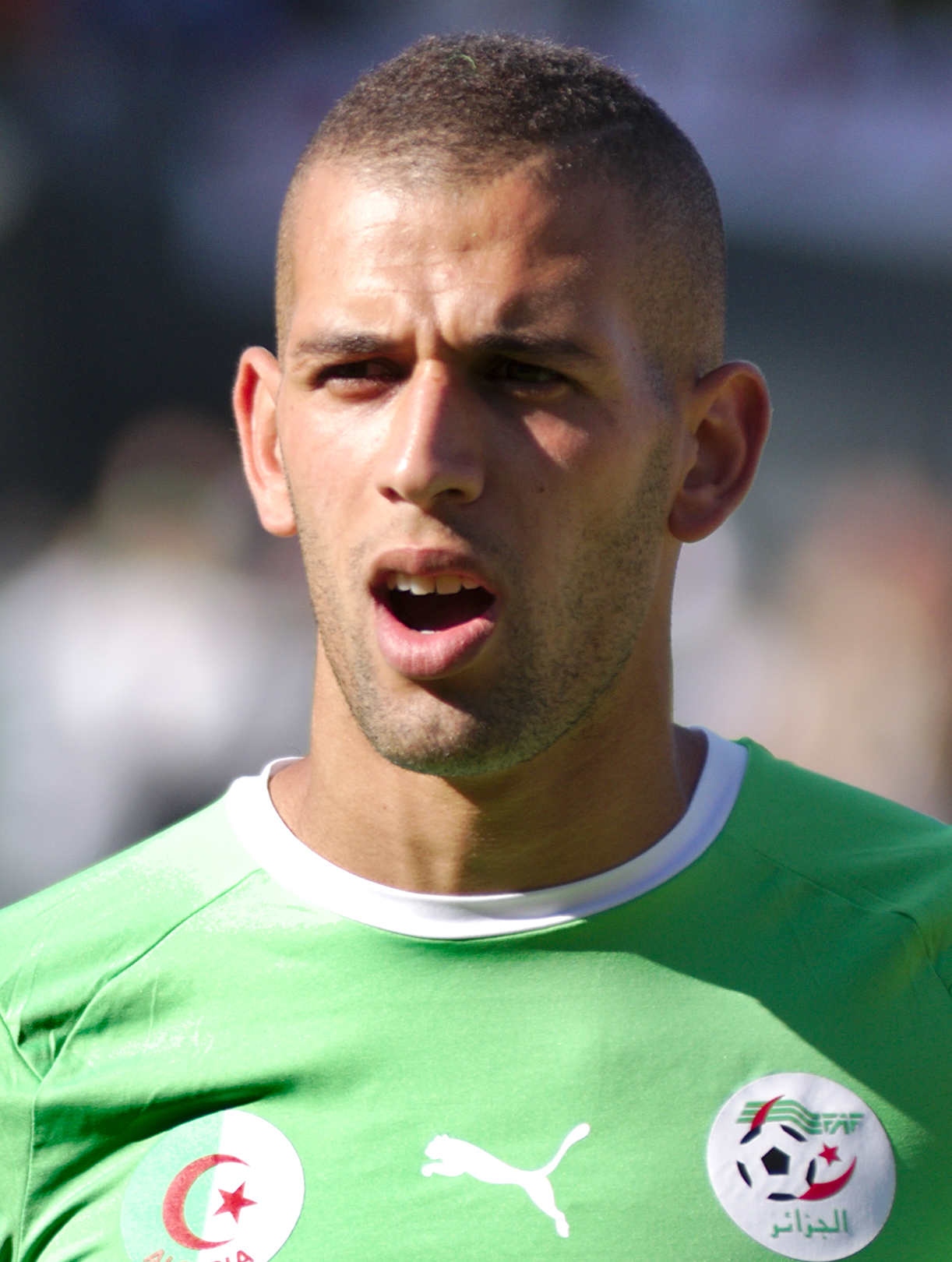
Islam Slimani is Algeria's top scorer with 46 goals.

Rank	Name	Goals	Caps	Ratio	Career
1	Islam Slimani	46	105	0.44	2012–2025
2	Riyad Mahrez	40	120	0.33	2014–2026
3	Abdelhafid Tasfaout	36	80	0.45	1990–2002
4	**Baghdad Bounedjah**	35	86	0.41	2013–present
5	Rabah Madjer	28	86	0.33	1978–1992
5	Lakhdar Belloumi	28	100	0.28	1978–1989
7	Djamel Menad	25	79	0.32	1980–1995
8	Hillal Soudani	24	56	0.43	2010–2021
9	**Mohamed Amoura**	19	51	0.37	2021–present
9	Tedj Bensaoula	19	52	0.37	1979–1986
9	Sofiane Feghouli	19	83	0.23	2012–2024

== Competitive record ==
=== FIFA World Cup ===
FIFA World Cup record										Qualification record					
Year	Round	Position	Pld	W	D	L	GF	GA	Squad	Pld	W	D	L	GF	GA
(Uruguay) 1930	Not a FIFA member									Not a FIFA member					
(Italy) 1934	Not a FIFA member									Not a FIFA member					
(France) 1938	Not a FIFA member									Not a FIFA member					
(Brazil) 1950	Not a FIFA member									Not a FIFA member					
(Switzerland) 1954	Not a FIFA member									Not a FIFA member					
(Sweden) 1958	Not a FIFA member									Not a FIFA member					
(Chile) 1962	Not a FIFA member									Not a FIFA member					
(England) 1966	Withdrew									Withdrew					
(Mexico) 1970	Did not qualify									2	0	1	1	1	2
(West Germany) 1974	Did not qualify									2	1	0	1	2	5
(Argentina) 1978	Did not qualify									4	1	2	1	2	3
(Spain) 1982	Group stage	13th	3	2	0	1	5	5	Squad	8	5	2	1	16	6
(Mexico) 1986	Group stage	22nd	3	0	1	2	1	5	Squad	6	5	1	0	13	3
(Italy) 1990	Did not qualify									6	3	2	1	6	2
(United States) 1994	Did not qualify									8	2	3	3	8	11
(France) 1998	Did not qualify									2	1	0	1	2	3
(South Korea) (Japan) 2002	Did not qualify									10	3	3	4	13	14
(Germany) 2006	Did not qualify									12	3	5	4	15	15
(South Africa) 2010	Group stage	28th	3	0	1	2	0	2	Squad	13	8	2	3	17	8
(Brazil) 2014	Round of 16	14th	4	1	1	2	7	7	Squad	8	6	0	2	16	7
(Russia) 2018	Did not qualify									8	2	2	4	15	12
(Qatar) 2022	Did not qualify									8	5	2	1	27	6
(Canada) (Mexico) (United States) 2026	Round of 32	30th	4	1	1	2	5	9	Squad	10	8	1	1	24	8
(Morocco) (Portugal) (Spain) 2030	To be determined									To be determined					
(Saudi Arabia) 2034	To be determined									To be determined					
Total	Round of 16	5/23	17	4	4	9	18	28	—	107	53	26	28	177	105

=== Africa Cup of Nations ===
Africa Cup of Nations record									Qualification record					
Year	Round	Position	Pld	W	D	L	GF	GA	Pld	W	D	L	GF	GA
(Sudan) 1957	Part of France								Part of France					
(United Arab Republic) 1959	Part of France								Part of France					
(Ethiopia) 1962	Part of France								Part of France					
(Ghana) 1963	Not affiliated to CAF								Not affiliated to CAF					
(Tunisia) 1965	Did not enter								Did not enter					
(Ethiopia) 1968	Group stage	6th	3	1	0	2	5	6	4	4	0	0	9	2
(Sudan) 1970	Did not qualify								4	1	1	2	3	3
(Cameroon) 1972	Did not qualify								2	1	0	1	3	4
(Egypt) 1974	Did not qualify								2	0	1	1	2	3
(Ethiopia) 1976	Did not qualify								2	0	1	1	2	3
(Ghana) 1978	Did not qualify								4	2	0	2	7	5
(Nigeria) 1980	Runners-up	2nd	5	2	2	1	6	7	2	1	0	1	3	2
(Libya) 1982	Fourth place	4th	5	2	1	2	5	6	4	2	1	1	13	5
(Ivory Coast) 1984	Third place	3rd	5	3	2	0	8	1	4	2	2	0	10	4
(Egypt) 1986	Group stage	6th	3	0	2	1	2	3	4	2	2	0	8	1
(Morocco) 1988	Third place	3rd	5	1	3	1	4	4	2	1	1	0	2	1
(Algeria) 1990	Champions	1st	5	5	0	0	13	2	Qualified as hosts					
(Senegal) 1992	Group stage	10th	2	0	1	1	1	4	Qualified as defending champions					
(Tunisia) 1994	Disqualified after qualification								6	4	1	1	13	4
(South Africa) 1996	Quarter-finals	5th	4	2	1	1	5	3	10	4	5	1	12	7
(Burkina Faso) 1998	Group stage	15th	3	0	0	3	2	5	6	3	1	2	9	5
(Ghana) (Nigeria) 2000	Quarter-finals	6th	4	1	2	1	5	4	8	4	1	3	14	8
(Mali) 2002	Group stage	15th	3	0	1	2	2	5	6	3	2	1	9	7
(Tunisia) 2004	Quarter-finals	8th	4	1	1	2	5	7	4	3	1	0	6	1
(Egypt) 2006	Did not qualify								12	3	5	4	15	15
(Ghana) 2008	Did not qualify								6	2	2	2	6	6
(Angola) 2010	Fourth place	4th	6	2	1	3	4	10	12	7	2	3	16	8
(Equatorial Guinea) (Gabon) 2012	Did not qualify								6	2	2	2	5	8
(South Africa) 2013	Group stage	13th	3	0	1	2	2	5	4	4	0	0	9	2
(Equatorial Guinea) 2015	Quarter-finals	6th	4	2	0	2	6	5	6	5	0	1	11	4
(Gabon) 2017	Group stage	10th	3	0	2	1	5	6	6	5	1	0	25	5
(Egypt) 2019	Champions	1st	7	6	1	0	13	2	6	3	2	1	9	4
(Cameroon) 2021	Group stage	20th	3	0	1	2	1	4	6	4	2	0	19	6
(Ivory Coast) 2023	Group stage	18th	3	0	2	1	3	4	6	5	1	0	9	2
(Morocco) 2025	Quarter-finals	5th	5	4	0	1	8	3	6	5	1	0	16	2
(Kenya) (Tanzania) (Uganda) 2027	To be determined								To be determined					
2028	To be determined								To be determined					
Total	2 Titles	21/35	85	32	24	29	105	96	150	82	38	30	265	127

=== Summer Olympics ===
Summer Olympics record
Year	Round	Position	Pld	W	D	L	GF	GA
(United Kingdom) 1908	Part of France							
(Sweden) 1912	Part of France							
(Belgium) 1920	Part of France							
(France) 1924	Part of France							
(Netherlands) 1928	Part of France							
(Germany) 1936	Part of France							
(United Kingdom) 1948	Part of France							
(Finland) 1952	Part of France							
(Australia) 1956	Part of France							
(Italy) 1960	Part of France							
(Japan) 1964	Did not enter							
(Mexico) 1968	Did not qualify							
(West Germany) 1972	Did not qualify							
(Canada) 1976	Did not qualify							
(Soviet Union) 1980	Quarter-finals	8th	4	1	1	2	4	5
(United States) 1984	Did not qualify							
(South Korea) 1988	Did not qualify							
1992 to present	See Algeria national under-23 football team							
Total	Quarter-finals	1/17	4	1	1	2	4	5

- Prior to the Barcelona 1992 campaign, the Football at the Summer Olympics was open to full senior national teams.

=== FIFA Arab Cup ===
FIFA Arab Cup record
Year	Round	Position	Pld	W	D	L	GF	GA
(Lebanon) 1963	Did not enter							
(Kuwait) 1964	Did not enter							
(Iraq) 1966	Did not enter							
(Saudi Arabia) 1985	Did not enter							
(Jordan) 1988	Group stage ^{1}	5th	4	1	2	1	3	3
(Ba'athist Syria) 1992	Did not enter							
(Qatar) 1998	Group stage ^{2}	10th	2	0	1	1	0	3
(Kuwait) 2002	Did not enter							
(Qatar) 2009	Canceled in qualifying rounds							
(Saudi Arabia) 2012	Did not enter							
(Qatar) 2021	Champions ^{3}	1st	6	4	2	0	13	4
(Qatar) 2025	Quarter final ^{4}	5th	4	2	2	0	8	2
(Qatar) 2029	To be determined							
Total	1 Titles	4/12	12	7	7	2	24	12

1. Algeria participated with the national University team
2. Algeria participated with the national U-23 team
3. Algeria participated with the national A' team (local players) in addition to players from other Arab leagues
4. Algeria participated with the national A' team (local players) in addition to players from other leagues

=== African Games ===
African Games record
Year	Round	Position	Pld	W	D	L	GF	GA
(Republic of the Congo) 1965	Fourth place	4th	5	2	0	3	6	5
(Nigeria) 1973	Group stage	5th	3	1	1	1	6	6
(Algeria) 1978	Gold	1st	5	4	1	0	9	2
(Kenya) 1987	Disqualified ^{1}							
1991 to 2015	See Algeria national under-23 football team							
2019 to present	See Algeria national under-20 football team							
Total	Gold Medal	3/4	13	7	2	4	21	13

- 1. Algeria withdrew in protest at CAF's decision to order a replay of the first leg against Tunisia; CAF had made this decision following Tunisia's protest that Algeria had fielded two ineligible players.
- Prior to the Cairo 1991 campaign, the Football at the African Games was open to full senior national teams.

=== Arab Games ===
Arab Games record
Year	Round	Position	Pld	W	D	L	GF	GA
(Egypt) 1953	Part of France							
(Lebanon) 1957	Part of France							
(Morocco) 1961	Part of France							
(United Arab Republic) 1965	Did not enter							
(Syria) 1976	Did not enter							
(Morocco) 1985	Bronze ^{1}	3rd	5	2	0	3	4	5
(Syria) 1992	Did not enter							
(Lebanon) 1997	Did not enter							
(Jordan) 1999	Withdrew							
(Algeria) 2004	No tournament							
(Egypt) 2007	Did not enter							
(Qatar) 2011	Did not enter							
2023 to present	See Algeria national under-23 football team							
Total	Bronze Medal	1/9	5	2	0	3	4	5

- 1. Algeria participated with the B team.
- Prior to the 2023 campaign, the Football at the Arab Games was open to full senior national teams.

=== Mediterranean Games ===
Mediterranean Games record
Year		Round	Position	Pld	W	D	L	GF	GA
1951 to 1959		Part of France							
(Italy) 1963		Did not enter							
(Tunisia) 1967		Group stage	6th	3	1	0	2	4	6
(Turkey) 1971		Did not qualify							
(Algeria) 1975^{1}		Gold	1st	6	6	0	0	14	3
(Socialist Federal Republic of Yugoslavia) 1979		Bronze	3rd	5	2	2	1	7	6
(Morocco) 1983		Group stage	6th	2	1	0	1	3	3
(Syria) 1987^{1}		Group stage	8th	3	0	0	3	1	7
1991 to 1997 & 2005		See Algeria national under-23 football team							
2001		See Algeria national under-21 football team							
2009		See Algeria national under-20 football team							
2013		See Algeria national under-19 football team							
2018 to	2022	See Algeria national under-18 football team							
2026 to present		See Algeria national under-21 football team							
Total		Gold Medal	5/10	19	10	2	7	29	25

- 1. Algeria participated with the national B team in 1975 and 1987.
- Prior to the Athens 1991 campaign, the Football at the Mediterranean Games was open to full senior national teams.

=== Other records ===
Year	Position
(Greece) 1969 World military Cup	2nd
(Iraq) 1972 Palestine Cup of Nations	3rd
(Libya) 1973 Palestine Cup of Nations	3rd
(Algeria) (Iran) 1991 Afro-Asian Cup of Nations	1st
(Tunisia) 7 November Cup 1995	2nd
(Mali) 2004 African Military cup	3rd
(Germany) 2005 World military Cup	2nd
(Uganda) 2008 African Military cup	2nd
(Brazil) 2011 World military Cup	1st
(South Korea) 2015 World military Cup	1st
(China) 2019 World military Cup	3rd
Total	3 titles

== All-time record against FIFA recognized nations ==
- Below is a record of all matches correct as of 6 October 2026 after match against Niger.

Algeria national football team head-to-head records
Against	Played	Won	Drawn	Lost	GF	GA	GD	% Won
Albania	2	1	0	1	4	5	−1	50%
Angola	10	2	7	1	12	11	+1	20%
Argentina	2	0	0	2	3	7	−4	0%
Armenia	1	1	0	0	3	1	+2	100%
Austria	2	0	1	1	3	5	−2	00.00%
Bahrain	2	1	1	0	5	1	+4	50%
Bangladesh	1	1	0	0	1	0	1	100%
Belgium	3	0	1	2	2	5	−3	0%
Benin	11	8	2	1	25	8	+17	72%
Bolivia	2	2	0	0	7	2	+5	100%
Botswana	5	5	0	0	15	3	+12	100%
Brazil	4	0	0	4	0	8	−8	0%
Bosnia and Herzegovina	1	0	0	1	0	1	−1	0%
Bulgaria	6	1	2	3	6	9	−3	16.66%
Burkina Faso	24	10	8	6	38	22	+16	41.67%
Burundi	7	4	3	0	13	5	+7	57.14%
Cameroon	11	2	4	5	12	13	−1	18.18%
Canada	1	1	0	0	1	0	1	100%
Cape Verde	6	3	2	1	13	6	+7	50%
Central African Republic	3	2	0	1	5	2	+3	66.67%
Chad	2	1	1	0	4	1	+3	50%
Chile	1	1	0	0	3	2	+1	100%
China	3	2	0	1	6	2	+4	66.67%
Colombia	1	1	0	0	3	0	+3	100%
Congo	3	2	1	0	5	1	+4	66.6%
DR Congo	7	3	4	0	9	4	+5	43%
Ivory Coast	23	6	10	7	24	26	−2	26.08%
Cuba	1	0	0	1	0	1	−1	0%
Czech Republic	2	1	0	1	4	2	+2	50%
Denmark	1	0	1	0	0	0	0	0%
Djibouti	2	2	0	0	12	0	+12	100%
Egypt	25	10	11	5	31	32	−1	40%
England	1	0	1	0	0	0	0	0%
Ethiopia	8	4	3	1	18	7	+11	50%
Equatorial Guinea	4	2	1	1	5	2	+3	50%
West Germany^{a}	2	2	0	0	4	0	+4	100%
Finland	1	1	0	0	2	0	+2	100%
France	1	0	0	1	1	4	−3	0%
Gabon	7	2	1	4	7	12	−5	14.3%
Gambia	10	5	3	2	14	7	+7	50.00%
Germany	3	2	0	1	5	3	+2	66.67%
East Germany^{a}	4	0	1	3	4	14	−10	0%
Ghana	11	4	2	5	14	13	+1	36%
Greece	3	2	0	1	7	2	+5	66.67%
Guatemala	1	1	0	0	7	0	+7	100.00%
Guinea	15	6	4	5	20	18	+2	40%
Guinea-Bissau	2	2	0	0	7	2	+5	100%
Hungary	1	0	0	1	1	3	−2	0%
Iran	4	2	0	2	5	5	0	50%
Iraq	9	2	4	3	7	10	−3	22.22%
Italy	1	0	0	1	0	1	−1	0%
Jordan	3	1	1	1	4	4	0	50.00%
Kenya	8	4	1	3	12	7	+5	50.00%
South Korea	2	1	0	1	4	4	0	50.00%
Lebanon	2	1	1	0	4	2	+2	50.00%
Lesotho	2	2	0	0	9	1	+8	100.00%
Liberia	7	4	3	0	18	5	+13	57.14%
Libya	17	13	2	2	24	7	+17	75%
Luxembourg	1	0	1	0	0	0	0	0%
Madagascar	2	2	0	0	4	1	+3	100%
Malawi	7	4	1	2	13	6	+7	57.14%
Malaysia	2	0	2	0	1	1	0	50%
Mali	19	10	2	7	25	22	+3	52.63%
Malta	3	2	1	0	3	1	+2	66.67%
Mauritania	5	3	1	1	12	3	+9	75%
Mexico	2	0	1	1	2	4	−2	0%
Morocco	33	11	12	10	33	31	+2	33.33%
Mozambique	4	3	0	1	11	3	+8	66.66%
Namibia	4	4	0	0	7	0	+7	100%
Netherlands	1	1	0	0	1	0	+1	100%
Niger	10	9	0	1	29	4	+25	90.00%
Nigeria	22	10	4	8	29	29	+0	45.45%
Northern Ireland	1	0	1	0	1	1	0	0%
Oman	3	3	0	0	6	1	+5	100%
Qatar	5	4	0	1	9	2	+7	80%
Palestine	1	1	0	0	2	0	+2	100%
Peru	1	0	1	0	1	1	0	0%
Portugal	1	0	0	1	0	3	-3	0%
Poland	2	0	0	2	1	6	−5	0%
Republic of Ireland	2	1	0	1	2	3	−1	50%
Romania	1	1	0	0	2	1	+1	100%
Russia^{b}	2	0	2	0	3	3	0	0%
Rwanda	7	5	2	0	12	2	+9	71.42%
Saudi Arabia	6	2	2	2	8	8	0	33.33%
Senegal	22	12	6	4	32	18	+14	54.54%
Serbia	1	0	0	1	1	3	−3	0%
Seychelles	2	2	0	0	6	0	+6	100%
Sierra Leone	6	2	3	1	7	4	+3	33%
Slovakia	1	0	1	0	1	1	0	0%
Slovenia	3	2	0	1	4	1	+3	66.6%
Somalia	2	2	0	0	6	1	+5	100%
South Africa	5	1	3	1	8	7	+1	20%
Spain	1	0	0	1	0	3	−3	0%
Sudan	8	4	3	1	12	4	+8	50%
Sweden	6	0	1	5	4	15	−11	0%
Switzerland	3	0	0	3	1	6	−5	0%
Syria	6	3	2	1	7	4	+3	50%
Tanzania	12	7	4	1	28	10	+18	58.33%
Togo	9	5	1	3	15	5	+10	55.56%
Tunisia	44	17	13	14	44	36	+8	38.63%
Turkey	3	2	0	1	2	4	−2	66.6%
Uganda	12	6	4	2	19	10	+9	50.00%
United Arab Emirates	6	2	3	1	4	4	0	33.33%
United States	1	0	0	1	0	1	−1	0%
Uruguay	2	1	1	0	1	0	+1	50.00%
Vietnam	1	1	0	0	5	0	+5	100%
South Yemen^{a}	1	1	0	0	4	1	+3	100%
Zambia	15	8	2	5	16	10	+6	53.33%
Zimbabwe	7	3	3	1	14	9	+5	42.85%
Total	548	235	149	164	793	546	+216	42.88%

(a) Denotes defunct national football team.
(b) Includes games against USSR.
(c) Includes games against Yugoslavia.

== Honours ==
=== Intercontinental ===
- Afro-Asian Cup of Nations
  - (gold) Champions (1): 1991

=== Continental ===
- CAF African Cup of Nations
  - Champions (2): 1990, 2019
  - Runners-up (1): 1980
  - Third place (2): 1984, 1988
- CAF African Nations Championship
  - Runners-up (1): 2022
- African Games^{1}
  - Gold medal (1): 1978

=== Subregional ===
- FIFA Arab Cup^{2}
  - (gold) Champions (1): 2021
- Mediterranean Games
  - (gold) Gold medal (2): 1975, 2026
- Arab Games
  - (bronze) Bronze medal (1): 1985
- Palestine Cup of Nations
  - (bronze) Third place (2): 1972, 1973

=== Friendly ===
- Indonesian Independence Cup (1): 1986
- Malta International Football Tournament (1): 1989
- FIFA Series (1): 2024 Algeria

=== Awards ===
- African National Team of the Year (7): 1980, 1981, 1982, 1991, 2009, 2014, 2019

=== Summary ===
Competition	1st place, gold medalist(s)	2nd place, silver medalist(s)	3rd place, bronze medalist(s)	Total
CAF African Cup of Nations	2	1	2	5
CAF African Nations Championship	0	1	0	1
Afro-Asian Cup of Nations	1	0	0	1
FIFA Arab Cup	1	0	0	1
Total	4	2	2	8

Notes

1. Competition organized by ANOCA, officially not recognized by FIFA.
2. Official subregional competition organized and recognized by FIFA since 2021. Previous editions were organized by UAFA.

== See also ==
- Algeria A' national football team
- Algeria national under-23 football team
- Algeria national under-20 football team
- Algeria national under-17 football team
- List of Algeria national football team managers
- List of Algeria international footballers
- Algeria national football team records and statistics
- List of leading goalscorers for the Algeria national football team
- Algeria national football team all-time record
- List of Algerian football players in foreign leagues

== Notes ==
A.Prior to Algerian independence in 1962, matches were organised under the auspices of the Front de Libération Nationale and it was called the FLN football team.

Preceded by 1988 Cameroon	African Champions; 1990 (First title)	Succeeded by 1992 Ivory Coast
Preceded by 2017 Cameroon	African Champions; 2019 (Second title)	Succeeded by 2021 Senegal
